= Love Destiny 2 =

Love Destiny 2 may refer to:

- Love Destiny 2 (TV series), also known as Phromlikhit, an upcoming Thai television series
- Love Destiny: The Movie, also known as Love Destiny 2, a Thai film.
