= Toong Sanaeha =

Thai television series

- Genre: Drama; Period; Musical
- Based on: Toong Sanaeha by Chulamanee
- Written by: Pranpramoon
- Directed by: Somching Srisupap
- Starring: Jarinporn Joonkiat; Denkhun Ngamnet; Butsakorn Wongpuapan; Jaron Sorat; Thunyaphat Pattarateerachaicharoen; Tanin Manoonsilp; Paswitch Boorananut; Rinrada Kaewbuasai
- Opening theme: "Who decides" (Thai: ใครกำหนด) performed by Patcharida Wattana
- Ending theme: "Loving you from afar is enough" (Thai: รักไกลๆก็พอ) performed by Pramote Vilepana
- Country of origin: Thailand
- Original language: Thai
- No. of episodes: 19

Production
- Producer: Somching Srisupap
- Cinematography: Phutsin Pimsari; Pichet Talao
- Editor: 24 Studio
- Running time: 120 minutes
- Production companies: Good Feeling Co., Ltd.

Original release
- Network: Channel 3
- Release: February 16 – March 29, 2020

Related
- Watsanarak (mid 2020)

Toong Sanaeha (Thai: ทุ่งเสน่หา) is a Thai TV drama based on the novel in the same title of Chulamanee. The first and only season aired on Channel 3 from February 16 to March 29, 2020, on every Friday from 8:30 pm to 10:30 pm, Saturday and Sunday from 8:30 pm to 10:25 pm, for 19 episodes.

It reruns the first episode on Saturday October 9, 2021 at the original time on Channel 3.

== Plot ==
The story takes place in the years 1972–1978, about the love story of the young people of Nong Namphueng County, Nakhon Sawan Province, where the path of love is not strewn with rose petals, even love so dear but had to succumb to the fact that life is full of uncertainty.

== Cast ==
=== Main ===
- Jarinporn Joonkiat as Yupin
- Denkhun Ngamnet as Mingkwan
- Butsakorn Wongpuapan as Samphao
- Jaron Sorat as Paitoon
- Thunyaphat Pattarateerachaicharoen as Kaewjai, Yupin's junior friend and Praiwan's sidekick

=== Supporting ===
- Tanin Manoonsilp as Praiwan
- Paswitch Boorananut as Captain Niphat
- Rinrada Kaewbuasai as Janthon
- Eisaya Hosuwan as Jinda
- Sorachut Sahadtanachai as Jamriang
- Natthachai Sirinanthachot as Ko, Praiwan's stooge and Samphao's employee
- Ponganan Wangsittidej as Jon, Praiwan's stooge and Samphao's employee
- Krittawat Chaodee as Sa, Praiwan's stooge and Samphao's employee
- Ratree Wittawat as Sali
- Chanokchon Chamnan as Manao
- Nattida Pitakworarat as Som
- Nai Sooksakul as Boonyuen, Yupin's father
- Arisara Wongchalee as Thongyot, Yupin's mother
- Sippothai Chantasiriwat as Sooksamue, Yupin's beautician friend
- Wattikorn Permsubhirun as Surat (Kuang), Mingkwan's Thai-Chinese friend and fellow conscript
- Latkamon Pinrojkirati as Panwat, naughty girl who courts Surat
- Ampha Phoosit as Thanom, Panwat's mother
- Krit Autthaseree as Colonel Sombat, Niphat's commander
- Daraneenuch Photipiti as Madam Jongjit, Sombat's wife
- Duanghathai Satthathip as Madam Nirobon, Niphat's mother
- Surasit Chaiat as Lieutenant General Nisit, Niphat's father
- Kaew Korravee as Niraporn, Niphat's older sister
- Nitwara Inchu as Nichapan, Niphat's older sister and Niraporn's younger sister
- Nino Sudtheerak as Phatai Thepthong, likay actor who seduces Kaewjai
- Rungjaras Khammi as Duangmanee Srinakorn, likay actress, Phatai Thepthong's jealous wife
- Klos Utthaseri as Xiamtiang, Surat's father
- Prima Ratchata as Zoktiang, Surat's mother
- Kasama Nitsaiphan as Mon, Mingkwan's father
- Santi Sativekakul as Kon, Kaewjai's father
- Rong Kaomulkadee as Pastor Klam
- Krittapas Sakdistano as Sergeant Somyot, Yupin's older brother
- Khakkingrak Khikkhiksaranang as Nongnart, Somyot's wife and Yupin's sister-in-law
- Sopitsuda Ittimatin as Yupa, Yupin's older sister

=== Special appearances ===
- Tanongsak Supakan as Headman Piak
- Veeraphon Chantrong as Drillmaster
- Janet Khiew as Pranom, in charge of sporting house
- Adam Zima as Bob, G.I. later Kaewjai's husband
- Pattarakorn Tangsupakul as Salakjit (Kimtiang), Surat's fiancée
- Jirawat Wachirasarunpat as Salakjit's father, the wealthy of Nakhon Sawan
- Lorena Schuett as Captain Srikanya, a female army officer who is arranged to be engaged to Niphat
- Thanupong Sakthanawat as singing contest MC
- Wuttiwat Thitijarasthanachot as Nui of Koei Chai, Yupa's husband and Yupin's brother-in-law

== Awards and nominations ==
Award	Category	Nominee(s)	Result	Ref.	Notes
MAYA Awards 2020	Popular Supporting Actress	Thunyaphat Pattarateerachaicharoen	Nominated		
MAYA Awards 2020	Popular Supporting Actor	Tanin Manoonsilp	Nominated		
17th Kom Chad Luek Awards	Best TV Drama	Toong Sanaeha	Nominated		
17th Kom Chad Luek Awards	Best Screenplay	Pranpramoon	Nominated		
17th Kom Chad Luek Awards	Best Director	Somching Srisupap	Nominated		
17th Kom Chad Luek Awards	Best Supporting Actor	Tanin Manoonsilp	Nominated		
17th Kom Chad Luek Awards	Best Actor	Jaron Sorat	Nominated		
17th Kom Chad Luek Awards	Best Actress	Jarinporn Joonkiat	Won		
12th Nataraj Awards	Best TV Drama	Toong Sanaeha	Nominated		
12th Nataraj Awards	Best Screenplay	Pranpramoon	Nominated		
12th Nataraj Awards	Best Director	Somching Srisupap	Nominated		
12th Nataraj Awards	Best Supporting Actor	Tanin Manoonsilp	Nominated		
12th Nataraj Awards	Best Casts	Toong Sanaeha	Nominated		
12th Nataraj Awards	Best Actress	Butsakorn Wongpuapan	Nominated		
12th Nataraj Awards	Best Editing	Mahasuk Tassanapuk	Nominated		
12th Nataraj Awards	Best Costume Design	Viriya Pongkajorn	Nominated		
12th Nataraj Awards	Best Art Direction	Virote Pongsadilok	Nominated		
35th TV Gold Awards	Best Composition		Nominated		
35th TV Gold Awards	Best Creative TV Drama	Toong Sanaeha	Nominated		
35th TV Gold Awards	Best Director	Somching Srisupap	Nominated		
35th TV Gold Awards	Best Screenplay	Pranpramoon	Nominated		
35th TV Gold Awards	Best Supporting Actress	Butsakorn Wongpuapan	Won		
LINE TV Awards 2021	LINE TV Best Viral Scene	อีกาลกิณี! อีดวงกินผัว!	Nominated		lit: ""You cursed harpy! Every man who loves you ends up dead!""
D Online Awards 2021	Popular TV Drama	Toong Sanaeha	Nominated		
D Online Awards 2021	Best Supporting Actress	Butsakorn Wongpuapan	Won		

== Sequel ==
Watsanarak is a sequel, the story of ascendancy, which is the story of the children's generation.
