= Ranee Campen =

Thai-English actress and model (born 1989)

- ราณี แคมเปน
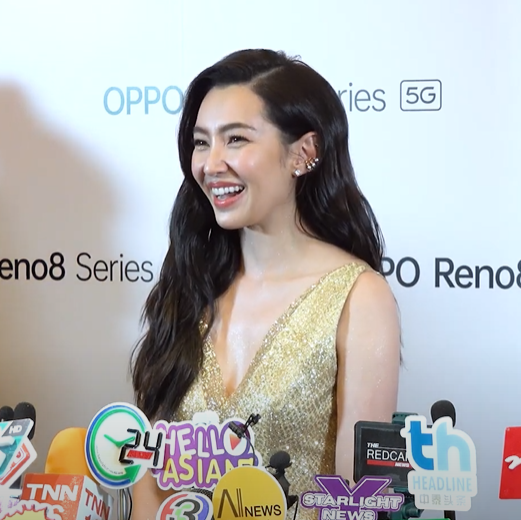
- Campen in 2022
- Born: 24 December 1989 (age 36); Bangkok, Thailand
- Other name: Bella
- Education: Thammasat University
- Occupations: Actress; Model; YouTuber
- Years active: 2011–present
- Agent: Channel 3
- Notable work: Krongkaew in Khun Chai Puttipat; Ketsurang in Bupphe Sanniwat; Renu in Krong Kam
- Height: 5 ft 4.9 in (1.65 m)
- Parents: Arnold Campen (father); Pranee Campen (mother)

Signature
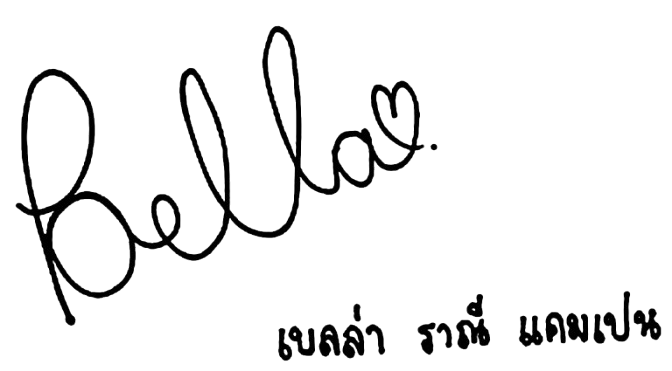

Ranee Campen (Thai: ราณี แคมเปน, born 24 December 1989), nicknamed Bella (Thai: เบลล่า), is a Thai-English actress and model. She is best known for her roles in the television dramas such as Porn Prom Onlaweng, Khun Chai Puttipat, Plerng Chimplee, Padiwaradda (The Loyal Wife), Plerng Boon, Love Destiny, Love Destiny 2, and Krong Kam (Cage of Karma) on Channel 3. In the 9-year period from 2013 to 2020, Bella won over 45 awards.

== Early life and education ==
Campen was born to a British father, Arnold Campen, and a Thai mother, Pranee. She is reportedly named after her great-grandmother, Bella Campen. Campen finished secondary school from Sarawittaya School. She graduated from Thammasat University with a bachelor's degree in Journalism and Mass Communication, Department of Radio and Television, where she also completed her master's degree.

In 2011, Bella started her entertainment career as a model in advertisements and after about 10 advertisements, she signed a contract with Channel 3 and became an actress.

In 2013, Bella got her 1st leading role and nomination for Porn Prom Onlaweng, which had the 5th highest rating among all prime time dramas shown on Channel 3 in that year. After Khun Chai Puttipat was on air, it became the most frequently searched drama on Google in Thailand and was ranked 4th in the prime time drama ratings point comparison. Because of the characters onscreen chemistry, Bella and Jirayu Tangsrisuk won "Fantasy Couple of the Year" at Kerd Award 2.0. In the same year, she played her second role as an elegant gentle lady in a prize-winning historical drama, Look Tard.

In 2014, Bella portrayed "Nuea Nang", an accomplished traditional dancer in the drama Plerng Chimplee, which earned her critical acclaim and award nominations. Ever since then, she has become one of the most sought-after actresses in the country, especially for period dramas.

In 2019, Bella went on to win the Best Actress award at the "Nataraj Awards" for her role in the Thai romantic comedy, Love Destiny and her versatility received a warm reception. Thailand's Prime Minister and Cultural Minister appreciated, and allocated funds for film to promote patriotism and Thai culture.

In 2023, Bella played the lead role in the Thai-Indian movie Congrats My Ex!, a romantic comedy around an Indian wedding alongside Vachirawit Chivaaree.

== Ambassadorships ==
During the COVID-19 pandemic, Bella as brand ambassador, joined the launch of the 'C-vitt' caravan, No.1 Vitamin C drink developed from a Japanese brand, to promote good health and good immunity to Thai people.

In 2021, Grab Thailand, the leading everyday super app in Southeast Asia, launched ‘GrabFood - Agents of S.A.L.E’ campaign, and announced Bella as its new brand presenter, to reinforce its image in Thailand.

In 2022, Bella became the new presenter for Brand's Essence of Chicken. Brand Tepthai collaborated with Bella for its promotion.

In March 2023, global luxury brand Fendi announced Bella as the first Friend of the brand in Thailand and she did a photoshoot for the brand's Women's Spring/Summer 2023 collection. She also attended reopening of Fendi's Emporium boutique in Bangkok, and at in the front row of brand's Fall/Winter 2023 presentations in Milan, Italy and managed to generate $660K in a Media Impact Value (MIV). She was celebrity guest in the launch of all-new Dior Addict Stellar Shine lipstick collection. She is brand ambassador for Japan-based cat food Nekko. Prima Gold International Co., Ltd., a Thai brand of gold jewellery, announced Bella-Ranee Campen to be its first presenter to build brand awareness. Since November 2023, Bella was become Fendi's Ambassador based on a repost of L'Officiel Thailand editorial on Fendi's official X account.

== Public image ==
Bella received 13.4% and ranked as "The Most Influential Celebrities of The Year" by Thairath. She regularly features in "10 Most Popular Thai Actresses". She's renowned face in cosmetics and fashion industry. By May 2023, she had over 8.8M followers in Instagram. She is acknowledged as "Queen of the Commercials" due to her brand value in the advertisement industries. She features in elite magazines like Harper's Bazaar and termed as "Rating Queen" in their editions, because of her impressive roles in successful movies.

== Personal life ==
She previously dated actor Sukollawat Kanarot from Channel 7. It is believed they started dating in 2013. However, they didn't publicly announce their relationship until 2017. On November 26, 2021, they announced their breakup. The reason for their split was that although they had made changes to adapt to each other in the past, they ultimately couldn't get along. The decision to end was to preserve their positive feelings for each other; they are no longer lovers but will remain friends, sharing conversations and discussions.

In May 2024, Bella publicly acknowledged dating businessman Will Schwin Chiaravanont, one of the heirs of the Chiaravanont family. She also revealed that they met by chance on a plane.

== Filmography ==
=== Film ===
Year	Title	Role	Notes	Ref.
2012	True Friend Never Dies	Dew	Supporting role	
2012	Fatherland		Supporting role	
2020	Riam Fighting Angel	Riam	Main role	
2022	Love Destiny 2	Gaysorn	Main role	
2023	Congrats My Ex!	Risa	Lead Role	

=== Television ===
Year	English title	Native Title	Role	Notes	Network	Ref.
2011	Roy Marn	รอยมาร	Maythawee Akacharat (May)	Supporting role	Channel 3	
2012	Tawan Yod Rak	ตะวันยอดรัก	Wiriya	Guest role	Channel 3	
2013	Porn Prom Onlaweng	พรพรหมอลเวง	TanYong Phanthakit / May	Main role	Channel 3	
2013	Suphapburut Juthathep; Khun Chai Puttipat	สุภาพบุรุษจุฑาเทพ คุณชายพุฒิภัทร	Krongkaew Boonmee (Kaew)	Main role	Channel 3	
2013	Khun Chai Rachanon	คุณชายรัชชานนท์	Krongkaew Jutathep Na Ayutthaya / Kaew	Cameo	Channel 3	
2013	Khun Chai Ronapee	คุณชายรณพีร์	Krongkaew Jutathep Na Ayutthaya / Kaew	Cameo	Channel 3	
2014	Look Tard	ลูกทาส	Namthip	Main role	Channel 3	
2014	Plerng Chimplee	เพลิงฉิมพลี	Nuea Nang	Main role	Channel 3	
2014–2015	Phope Ruk	ภพรัก	Rintara Warinpitak (Naamrin)	Main role	Channel 3	
2016	Padiwaradda: The Loyal Wife	ปดิวรัดา	Rin Rapee / Rin Rapipan / Baralee Sivavate	Main role	Channel 3	
2016	Wimarn Mekkala	วิมานเมขลา	Mekkala Wattanaboribarn	Main role	Channel 3	
2017	Plerng Boon	เพลิงบุญ	Pimala Mithamorn	Main role	Channel 3	
2018	Bupphe Sanniwat	บุพเพสันนิวาส	Kadesurang / Karakade	Main role	Channel 3	
2018	Pee Kaew Nang Hong	ปี่แก้วนางหงส์	Pikul / Rarin	Main role	Channel 3	
2019	Krong Kam	กรงกรรม	Renu Aussawarungreiangchai	Main role	Channel 3	
2020	Roy Leh Marnya	ร้อยเล่ห์มารยา	Pitcha Phoomsophon (Aim)	Main role	Channel 3	
2021	Dare To Love: Hai Ruk Pipaksa	Dare To Love: ให้รักพิพากษา	Thichakorn Phornpracha (Thicha)	Main role	Channel 3	
2023	Prom Likit	พรหมลิขิต	Puttarn / Ketsurang / Karaket	Main role	Channel 3	
2024	Chao Khun Pi Kap I Nang Kham Duang	เจ้าคุณพี่กับอีนางคำดวง	Kham Duang	Main role	Channel 3	

=== Music video appearances ===
Year	Title	Artist	Notes	Ref.
2018	ซ่อนกลิ่น (Sorn Klin)	Palmy	19 October 2018	
2022	"You Make Me Smile" (ยอมทั้งใจ)	Vachirawit Chivaaree	GMMTV Records	

=== Master of Ceremony: MC ===
Year	Network	With
2019–present	YouTube channel: Ploy and Bell	Weena Mesakamneidchai
2020–present	YouTube channel: BellaCampenFC	

== Awards and nominations ==
Won	58
Nominated	69

Year	Award	Category	Nominated work	Result	Ref.
2013	6th Siam Dara Star Awards	Best Actress (TV)	Porn Prom Onlaweng	Nominated	
2013	6th Siam Dara Star Awards	Best New Actress	Porn Prom Onlaweng	Nominated	
2013	6th Siam Dara Star Awards	Popular Female Star	—N/a	Nominated	
2013	2nd Kerd Awards	Fantasy Couple of the Year (with Jirayu Tangsrisuk)	Khun Chai Puttipat	Won	
2013	Seesan Bunturng Awards	Popular Female Actress	Khun Chai Puttipat	Won	
2014	G-member Awards	Best Couple (with Jirayu Tangsrisuk)	Khun Chai Puttipat	Nominated	
2014	8th Kazz Awards	Top Actress Award	Khun Chai Puttipat	Nominated	
2014	8th Kazz Awards	Best Couple (with Jirayu Tangsrisuk)	Khun Chai Puttipat	Nominated	
2014	3rd Daradaily the Great Awards	Female Rising Star	Khun Chai Puttipat	Won	
2014	3rd Daradaily the Great Awards	Hot Girl of the Year	—N/a	Nominated	
2014	4th Mthai Top Talk Awards	Top Talk-About Actress	Khun Chai Puttipat	Nominated	
2014	Department of Physical Education – Ministry of Tourism and Sports	Recreational Reward Prize	—N/a	Won	
2014	7th Nine Entertain Awards	Public Favorite	—N/a	Nominated	
2014	Father's Day Honor Ceremony	Oblige Child Example of the Year	—N/a	Won	
2014	Seesan Bunturng Awards	Popular Female Actress	Look Tard, Plerng Chimplee, Phope Ruk	Won	
2014	1st EFM Awards	Most Popular Actor – March	Look Tard	Nominated	
2014	1st EFM Awards	Most Popular Actor – December	Phope Ruk	Won	
2015	4th Daradaily the Great Awards	Hot Girl of the Year	—N/a	Nominated	
2015	8th Nine Entertain Awards	Public Favorite	—N/a	Nominated	
2015	9th Kazz Awards	Top Actress Award	Look Tard	Nominated	
2015	12th Kom Chad Luek Awards	Popular Vote – Actress	Look Tard	Won	
2015	8th Siam Dara Stars Awards	Popular Female Star	—N/a	Nominated	
2015	Star's Light Awards	Charming Girl	—N/a	Won	
2016	4th Mekkala Star Awards	Outstanding Female Actress	Phope Ruk	Won	
2016	10th Kazz Awards	Top Actress Award	Phope Ruk	Won	
2016	10th Kazz Awards	Top Girl of the Year	—N/a	Won	
2016	10th Kazz Awards	Best Couple (with Jirayu Tangsrisuk)	—N/a	Nominated	
2016	9th Nine Entertain Awards	Public Favorite	—N/a	Nominated	
2016	13th Kom Chad Luek Awards	Popular Vote – Actress	Phope Ruk	Won	
2016	1st Dara Inside Awards	Popular Actress	Padiwaradda	Won	
2016	1st Dara Inside Awards	Best Couple (with Jirayu Tangsrisuk)	Padiwaradda	Won	
2016	2nd Maya Awards	Best Actress (TV)	Padiwaradda	Nominated	
2016	2nd Maya Awards	Best Couple (with Jirayu Tangsrisuk)	Padiwaradda	Nominated	
2016	9th Siam Dara Stars Awards	Popular Female Star	—N/a	Nominated	
2017	6th Daradaily the Great Awards	Hot Girl of the Year	—N/a	Nominated	
2017	6th Daradaily the Great Awards	Best Actress (TV)	Padiwaradda	Nominated	
2017	7th Mthai Top Talk Awards	Top Talk-About Actress	Padiwaradda	Nominated	
2017	11th Kazz Awards	Top Actress Award	Padiwaradda	Nominated	
2017	11th Kazz Awards	Best Couple (with Jirayu Tangsrisuk)	Padiwaradda	Nominated	
2017	14th Kom Chad Luek Awards	Popular Vote – Actress	Padiwaradda	Won	
2017	3rd Maya Awards	Charming Girl	—N/a	Nominated	
2017	3rd Maya Awards	Best Couple (with Jirayu Tangsrisuk)	—N/a	Nominated	
2017	2nd Dara Inside Awards	Popular Actress	Wimarn Mekkala	Nominated	
2017	2nd Dara Inside Awards	Best Couple (with Jirayu Tangsrisuk)	—N/a	Won	
2018	Star's Light Awards	Charming Main Actress	Plerng Boon	Won	
2018	6th Howe Awards	Best Actress	Plerng Boon	Won	
2018	8th Mthai Top Talk Awards	Top Talk-About Actress	Plerng Boon	Nominated	
2018	Press Awards	Most Popular Actress	Bupphe Sanniwat	Won	
2018	12th Kazz Awards	Top Actress Award	Plerng Boon	Nominated	
2018	12th Kazz Awards	Public Favorite – Female	—N/a	Won	
2018	12th Kazz Awards	Top Girl of the Year	—N/a	Won	
2018	7th Daradaily the Great Awards	Hot Girl of the Year	—N/a	Nominated	
2018	7th Daradaily the Great Awards	Popular Vote – Female	—N/a	Won	
2018	9th Nataraj Awards	Best Ensemble Cast	Plerng Boon	Nominated	
2018	11th Nine Entertain Awards	Best Actress	Plerng Boon	Nominated	
2018	11th Nine Entertain Awards	Public Favorite	—N/a	Won	
2018	10th Siam Dara Star Awards	Best Actress (TV)	Bupphe Sanniwat	Nominated	
2018	10th Siam Dara Star Awards	Popular Female Actress	Bupphe Sanniwat	Won	
2018	4th Maya Awards	Best Actress (TV)	Bupphe Sanniwat	Won	
2018	4th Maya Awards	Charming Girl	—N/a	Won	
2018	3rd Dara Inside Awards	Best Actress	Bupphe Sanniwat	Won	
2018	3rd Dara Inside Awards	Popular Actress	Bupphe Sanniwat	Nominated	
2018	3rd Dara Inside Awards	Best Couple (with Thanavat Vatthanaputi)	Bupphe Sanniwat	Nominated	
2018	6th Thailand Headlines Person of the Year	Popular Award (with Thanavat Vatthanaputi)	Bupphe Sanniwat	Won	
2018	12th OK! Awards	Male Heartthrob	—N/a	Won	
2018	12th OK! Awards	Spotlight	Bupphe Sanniwat	Won	
2018	1st White TV Awards	Best Actress	Bupphe Sanniwat	Nominated	
2018	Faculty of Journalism and Communication – Thammasat University	Outstanding Alumni Award	—N/a	Won	
2018	1st ET Thailand Awards	Public Favorite Entertainment Darling	—N/a	Nominated	
2018	Seesan Bunturng Awards	Best Actress	Bupphe Sanniwat	Won	
2018	Seesan Bunturng Awards	Best Couple (with Thanavat Vatthanaputi)	Bupphe Sanniwat	Won	
2018	Seesan Bunturng Awards	Best Ensemble Cast	Bupphe Sanniwat	Won	
2019	Dara Variety Awards	Public Favorite Star – Female	Bupphe Sanniwat	Won	
2019	2nd LINE TV Awards	Best Viral Scene	Bupphe Sanniwat	Won	
2019	2nd LINE TV Awards	Best Kiss Scene (with Thanavat Vatthanaputi)	Bupphe Sanniwat	Nominated	
2019	2nd LINE TV Awards	Best Comedy Scene	Bupphe Sanniwat	Won	
2019	2nd LINE TV Awards	Best Couple (with Thanavat Vatthanaputi)	Bupphe Sanniwat	Nominated	
2019	Royal Society of Thailand Awards	Best Actress in a Leading Role	Bupphe Sanniwat	Won	
2019	33rd TV Gold Awards	Best Actress	Bupphe Sanniwat	Won	
2019	33rd TV Gold Awards	Best Female Star	Bupphe Sanniwat	Nominated	
2019	7th Thailand Zocial Awards	Best Entertainment On Social Media – Actress	Bupphe Sanniwat	Won	
2019	15th Kom Chad Luek Awards	Best Actress (TV)	Bupphe Sanniwat	Nominated	
2019	15th Kom Chad Luek Awards	Popular Vote – Actress	Bupphe Sanniwat	Won	
2019	9th Mthai Top Talk Awards	Top Talk-About Actress	Bupphe Sanniwat	Won	
2019	13th Kazz Awards	Top Actress Award	Bupphe Sanniwat	Nominated	
2019	13th Kazz Awards	Superstar Award – Female	—N/a	Won	
2019	13th Kazz Awards	Popular Vote	—N/a	Nominated	
2019	13th Kazz Awards	Best Couple (with Thanavat Vatthanaputi)	Bupphe Sanniwat	Nominated	
2019	8th Daradaily the Great Awards	Best Actress (TV)	Bupphe Sanniwat	Won	
2019	8th Daradaily the Great Awards	Hot Girl of the Year	—N/a	Nominated	
2019	12th Nine Entertain Awards	Public Favorite	—N/a	Nominated	
2019	12th Nine Entertain Awards	Best Actress	Bupphe Sanniwat	Won	
2019	10th Nataraj Awards	Best Actress	Bupphe Sanniwat	Won	
2019	10th Nataraj Awards	Best Ensemble Cast	Bupphe Sanniwat	Nominated	
2019	5th Maya Awards	Best Actress (TV)	Krong Kam	Nominated	
2019	5th Maya Awards	Charming Girl	—N/a	Nominated	
2019	5th Maya Awards	Best Couple (with Sukollawat Kanarot)	—N/a	Nominated	
2019	4th Dara Inside Awards	Popular Actress	Krong Kam	Nominated	
2019	3rd Great Stars Social Awards	Best Female Star of the Year	—N/a	Nominated	
2019	Seesan Bunturng Awards	Best Mother-in-law & Daughter-in-law (with Mai Charoenpura)	Krong Kam	Won	
2019	1st Zoomdara New Year Awards	Zoom Female Lead	Krong Kam	Nominated	
2020	8th Thailand Zocial Awards	Best Entertainment On Social Media – Actress	Krong Kam	Won	
2020	16th Kom Chad Luek Awards	Best Actress (TV)	Krong Kam	Nominated	
2020	16th Kom Chad Luek Awards	Popular Vote – Actress	Krong Kam	Nominated	
2020	14th Kazz Awards	Popular Vote	—N/a	Nominated	
2020	11th Nataraj Awards	Best Ensemble Cast	Krong Kam	Won	
2020	6th Maya Awards	Charming Girl	—N/a	Nominated	
2020	6th Maya Awards	Best Couple (with Sukollawat Kanarot)	—N/a	Nominated	
2020	2nd Zoomdara Awards	Best Couple (with Sukollawat Kanarot)	—N/a	Nominated	
2020	Seesan Bunturng Awards	Best Actress	Roy Leh Marnya	Won	
2020	Seesan Bunturng Awards	Best Couple (with Thanavat Vatthanaputi)	Roy Leh Marnya	Won	
2021	29th Thailand National Film Association Awards	Best Actress	Riam Fighting Angel	Nominated	
2021	4th Fever Awards	Fever Leading Actress (Film)	Riam Fighting Angel	Won	
2021	4th Fever Awards	Most Talked About Actress	—N/a	Won	
2021	17th Kom Chad Luek Awards	Best Actress (Film)	Riam Fighting Angel	Nominated	
2021	17th Kom Chad Luek Awards	Popular Vote – Actress	Riam Fighting Angel	Nominated	
2021	1st D Online Awards	Popular Female Lead	Riam Fighting Angel	Nominated	
2021	11th Thai Film Director Awards	Best Actress	Riam Fighting Angel	Won	
2021	18th Starpics Thai Films Awards	Best Actress	Riam Fighting Angel	Nominated	
2021	1st Siam Series Awards	Best Lead Actress		Won	
2021	7th Maya Awards	Popular Actress		Nominated	
2021	3rd Zoomdara Awards	Best Actress		Nominated	
2022	Maya Entertain Awards	Charming Girl		Nominated	
2022	Maya Entertain Awards	Leading Actress of the year		Nominated	
2022	Maya Entertain Awards	Popular vote of Maya		Nominated	
