= Love Destiny: The Movie =

2022 Thai film

- Film poster
- Directed by: Adisorn Tresirikasem
- Written by: Adisorn Tresirikasem
- Produced by: Jira Maligool; Vanridee Pongsittisak; Arunosha Panupan
- Starring: Ranee Campen; Thanavat Vatthanaputi
- Cinematography: Niramon Ross
- Edited by: Chonlasit Upanigkit
- Music by: Vichaya Vatanasapt
- Production companies: Jor Kwang Films; Broadcast Thai Television
- Distributed by: GDH 559
- Release date: 28 July 2022
- Running time: 166 minutes
- Countries: China; Hong Kong; Thailand
- Language: Thai

Love Destiny: The Movie, known in Thai as Bupphesanniwat 2 (Thai: บุพเพสันนิวาส 2, 'Love Destiny 2') is a 2022 Thai historical comedy film directed by Adisorn Tresirikasem. It is co-produced by GDH 559 and Broadcast Thai Television, and is a spin-off of the highly successful 2018 television drama Love Destiny, in addition to a TV drama sequel, Love Destiny 2.

The film stars Ranee Campen and Thanavat Vatthanaputi, who play 19th-century Rattanakosin-era reincarnations of their characters from the original drama, which was set in the Ayutthaya Kingdom of the 17th century.

The film was released on 28 July 2022.

== Synopsis ==
The story of the later lives of Det (Thanawat Wattanaputi) and Karaket (Ranee Campen) set in the early Rattanakosin period by Det was born as Khun Sombat Bodi (Phop) the chief engineer of the Royal Treasury Department and Karaket was born as Gaysorn, the daughter of a senior nobleman in the Royal Police Department. Two of them met through the induction of dreams and the appearance of a mysterious, anachronistic stranger, Mathas, who is the descendant of a scheming Scottish merchant, Robert Hunter. Everyone must then work together to help and save history.

Methas Hantrakul, an online merchant, travels through time from the year 2021 with an antique musket which was a property of his ancestors. After a solar eclipse at Wat Prayurawongsawas Worawihan to Siam in the year 2384, early Rattanakosin period, he went to work as the right-hand man of Luang Awutwisa Prathetphanit (Robert Hunter) or Mr. Hantrae at the British Factory or the United Kingdom of Great Britain and Ireland Warehouse. At the invitation of Angelina or Thanpuying Sapp, Mr. Hantrae’s wife who is a descendant of Chao Phraya Wichayen, Methas tries to use the gun to send himself back to the present day every chance he gets, but to no avail.

Three years later, Khun Sombat Bodi (Phop), the chief engineer of the Royal Treasury Department, broke off the engagement with a woman whom his parents had manipulated since she was young because he was fascinated by the image of a beautiful woman who had been his dream for many years. Meanwhile, Kesorn, the daughter of a high-ranking nobleman in the Royal Police Department, is a modern young woman who is not good at housework. However, she is educated by Father Jean-Baptiste Pallegoix at the Assumption Cathedral until she becomes fluent, proficient in English and world history. The priest buys an ancient notebook from the Ayutthaya period and assigns Kesorn to study. The notebook has a strange style that is unlike any other from that era. She tries reading it and discovers that the owner of the notebook is Kesurang, who died in a car accident in the present era and traveled back in time to the body of Lady Karakade in the Ayutthaya era and is in love with Ok Khun Siwisan Wacha. Kesurang uses her knowledge of history to take notes in order to tell and warn her children and grandchildren to prepare for what might happen in the future.
