= Witsarut Himmarat =

Thai actor

- วิศรุต หิมรัตน์
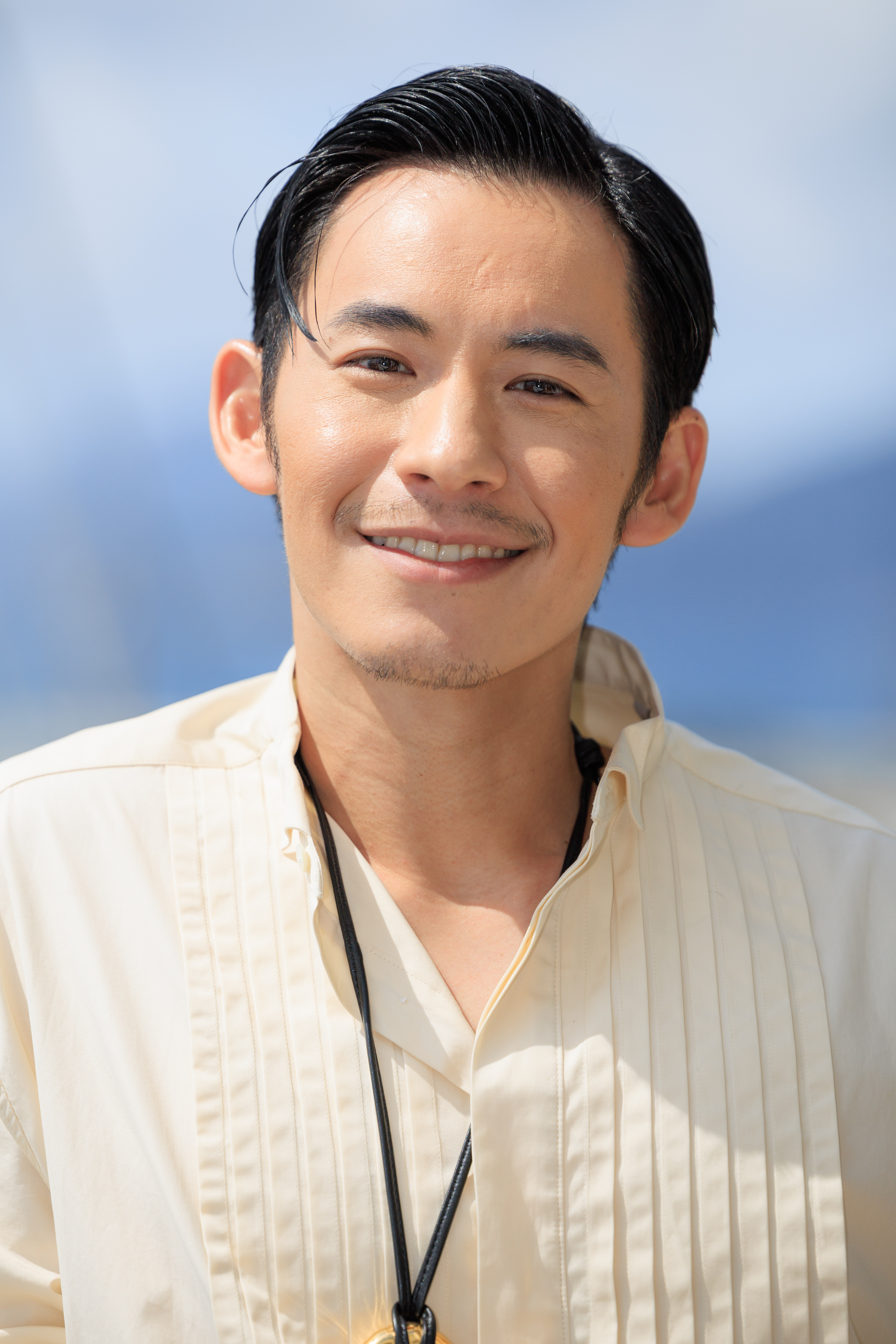
- Most in 2025
- Born: 6 January 1993 (age 33); Mueang Udon Thani District, Udon Thani, Thailand
- Other name: Most
- Occupation: Actor
- Years active: 2012–present
- Agent: Broadcast Thai Television (2012–present)
- Height: 1.75 m (5 ft 9 in)

Witsarut Himmarat (Thai: วิศรุต หิมรัตน์), or also known by his nickname Most (Thai: โมสต์), is Thai actor for the Broadcast Thai Television Company or also known as Channel 3. He is best known for his role as Joi in Bupphesanniwat.

== Personal life ==
Witsarut was born on 6 January 1993 at Udontani Hospital. He is a native of Nong Khai. He is the second child of four, and he has two brothers and a sister. Witsarut graduated from the Faculty of Fine Arts from Srinakharinwirot University. Witsarut began his acting career on the Nong Mai Rai Borisut in 2012, his role was Phupha, with the Channel 3.

== Filmography ==
=== Drama ===
Year	Title	Role
2015	Bangrajun	Young Uttin
2015	Kolkimono	Roeng Tawan (cameo)
2018	Bupphesanniwat	Joi (Det's attendant)
2020	Fah Fak Rak	Wasin Tensood (Toy)
2020	My Husband in Law	Witsarut Sukkasem (Not)
2021	Duang Tah Tee Sarm	Jim (cameo)
2023	Love Destiny 2	Joi (Det's attendant)
2025	Tee Yai: Born to Be Bad	Rerk
2025	Our House	Nu

=== Series ===
Year	Title	Role	Note
2013–2016	Nong Mai Rai Borisut	Phupha	
2015	The Sense	Chit	น้ำตาสายเลือด
2015	Deadtime Stories	Keng	
2017	Love Songs Love Series	Wing	ตอน เรือเล็กควรออกจากฝั่ง
2018	Nong Mai Rai Borisut	Phupha (cameo)	Ep. Phupha Return
2020	Nong Mai Rai Borisut		Ep. Phupha Return
2025	The Next Prince	Vetith	
2026	Mr. Fanboy	North	Supporting role

=== Sitcom ===
Year	Title	Role
2013–2015	Ruk Jad Tem	Kan Yaw

=== Stage Play ===
Year	Title	Role
2013	วัยวันวาน	Jord
2016	Dans le Noir ในความมืด	Satanon
2017	ตึกคุณหญิงหรี่	Somyot
2018	The Return of Wanthong 2018	Jameun Wai (young)
