= Rinrada Kaewbuasai =

Thai actress

- รินรดา แก้วบัวสาย
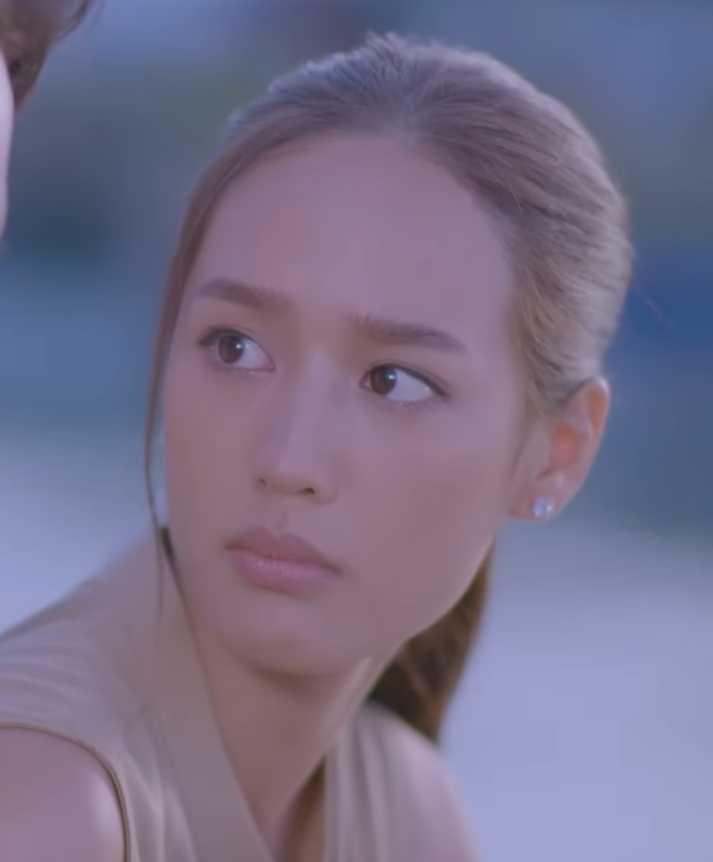
- Born: 8 April 1995 (age 31); Bangkok, Thailand
- Other name: Pie Rinrada
- Occupations: Actress; model
- Years active: 2015–present
- Agent: Channel 3 (2015–present)
- Height: 5 ft 6.1 in (1.68 m)
- Partner: James Ma

Rinrada Kaewbuasai (Thai: รินรดา แก้วบัวสาย), nicknamed Pie (พาย), is a Thai actress and model. She is an actress on Channel 3. She's known for her roles in Krong Kam.

== Early life ==
Pie was born on April 8, 1995, in Bangkok, Thailand. Both parents worked in the aviation industry, and her elder brother is Nattavat Kaewbuasai (Cake), who is also an actor. Her aunt is Nantida Kaewbuasai, a famous singer actress and chairwoman of Samut Prakan Provincial Administrative Agency. In 2017, Pie graduated from the Faculty of Fine Arts and Applied Arts (Drama Department) of Thammasat University, and served as the cheerleader of the department during her studies.

== Career ==
In August 2015, Pie was invited to audition for Channel 3 and started working as a magazine model. After that, she worked as a program announcer on Channel 3, and film her first TV series "Tawan Yor Saeng" until the third year of university.

In 2019, Pie played the heroine for the first time in the TV series "The Man Series: Pupa". In the same year, Pie won the CUTE GIRL OF THE YEARS 2019 award at the 13th Kazz Awards Ceremony.

=== Dramas ===
Year	Thai Title	English Title	Role	Network
2017	ตะวันยอแสง	Tawan Yor Saeng	Jaiboon (Supporting)	Channel 3
2017	ระเริงไฟ	Ra Raerng Fai	Chayanee / "Nee" (Supporting)	Channel 3
2018	ชาติเสือพันธุ์มังกร	Chart Suer Pun Mungkorn	Lim Puay Sang (Supporting)	Channel 3
2019	ซีรีส์ลูกผู้ชาย ตอน ภูผา	The Man Series: Pupa	Thoroong / "Roong"	Channel 3
2019	กรงกรรม	Krong Kam	Wanna	Channel 3
2019	ซีรีส์ ลูกผู้ชาย: ปัทม์	The Man Series: Pat	Thoroong / "Roong" (Cameo)	Channel 3
2019	เขาวานให้หนูเป็นสายลับ	My Secret Bride	Neungthida / "Neung" (Supporting)	Channel 3
2020	ทุ่งเสน่หา	Toong Sanaeha	Juntara (Supporting)	Channel 3
2021	เมียจำเป็น	Mia Jum Pen	Tawan Akkaramontri	Channel 3
2023	เพราะรัก	Because of Love	Musica Suriyari / "Nurhing" / "Rhing"	Channel 3
2025	ใจขังเจ้า	Jai Khung Chao	Mae Ying Chawala	Channel 3
2026	รักหักหลัง	Rak Haklang	Phidpicha Advijhid (Pai)	Channel 3
2024	อุบัติรักเกาะสวรรค์	Ubat Rak Ko Sawan	Pearwah	Channel 3

== Personal life ==
As of 2023, Rinrada was in a relationship with actor James Ma.
