= James Ma =

Thai actor and model

- เจมส์ มาร์ 马l詹姆斯
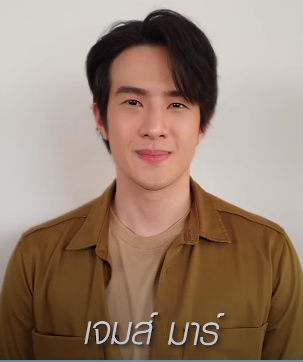
- Born: James Assarasakorn; July 3, 1993 (age 33); Bangkok, Thailand
- Education: Assumption University
- Occupation: Actor
- Years active: 2013–present
- Agent: Channel 3 (2013–present)
- Notable work: Suphapburut Juthathep (2013); Ka Badin (2015); Piang Chai Kon Nee Mai Chai Poo Wised (2015)
- Height: 1.85 m (6 ft 1 in)
- Partner: Rinrada Kaewbuasai
- Website: CH3 Profile

James Assarasakorn (Thai: เจมส์ อัศรัสกร, RTGS: Chem Atsaratsakon; born July 3, 1993) known professionally as James Ma (Thai: เจมส์ มาร์, RTGS: Chem Ma), is a Thai actor. He made an acting debut in 2013 in Gentlemen of Jutathep Series as M.R. Ronapee Jutathep. He is currently working under Channel 3 (Thailand).

== Early life and education ==
Ma was born in Bangkok to a Thai Chinese father and a Hong Kong Teochew mother. He has one younger sister. Ma first attended NIST International School, but at the age of 8, his family moved to Hong Kong, where he resumed studying in Quarry Bay School. He then excelled 2 years past his usual studying year group and attended South Island School of Hong Kong. In late 2011, he was discovered by Supachai Srivijit, who then became his manager in the entertainment industry, and Ma returned to Thailand to study in Harrow International School, Bangkok. He received a bachelor's degree of Arts in Business English and a master's degree of Business Administration in Tourism and Hospitality Management from Assumption University. Before Ma decided to be an actor, he thought about being a pro golfer. He won a gold medal in the ISSFHK Golf Pairs Championship 2008 in Hong Kong and many other awards against other schools. In 2008, he auditioned for The Star (season 7), a Thai reality show and singing competition, but didn't pass through the final audition.

== Career ==
Ma made his acting debut at the age of 20 with a lead role in the period drama Gentlemen of Jutathep in 2013. This series was made to celebrate ThaiTV3's 43rd anniversary, which assigned five top producers to each make a period drama about the five Jutathep brothers: Khun Chai Taratorn, Khun Chai Pawornruj, Khun Chai Phuttipat, Khun Chai Rachanon and Khun Chai Ronapee. Ma's main series Khun Chai Ronapee was directed by Chatchai Plengpanich and he acted with female lead Chalida Vijitvongthong.

In 2014, Ma starred in the short film Thai Niyom: Prince Pom as Prince Pom. In the same year, Ma participated in a Give Me 5 Concert alongside Mario Maurer, Sukollawat Kanarot, Nadech Kugimiya and Phupoom Pongpanu. During the concert, he invited Tata Young and Boy Peacemaker as his special guests.

In 2015, Ma returned to TV screens with a romance action drama The King's Servant directed by Atthaporn Teemakorn. This story takes place in the era of Rama III, the third king of Siam under the House of Chakri. The story sets around the period when Britain (known as Wilat at that time) enters into a commercial partnership role with Siam. He was paired opposite Peranee Kongthai in the series.

In the same year, Ma was cast as a lead role in Just a Man, Not a Magician with Kimberley Anne Woltemas. This drama is a remake of 2001 Samee Ngern Phon, and was produced by Ann Thongprasom and directed by Kritsada Techanilobon.

In late 2015, Ma made his movie debut as a lead role alongside South Korean actress Hahm Eun-jung in a sci-fi romance movie Microlove. This movie was directed by Sathanapong Limwongthong. It revolves around an outgoing and wealthy Thai man, who works in a Korean software company that privately develops a software and catches the interest of the president's daughter

== Personal life ==
Before becoming an actor, Ma had dreams of becoming a golfer. While studying at South Island School in Hong Kong, he won gold medal pairing with Nicholas Woolcott-Brown in the ISSFHK Golf Pairs Championship competition in November 2008.

In 2023, Ma announced his relationship with actress Rinrada Kaewbuasai.

== Filmography ==
=== Film ===
Year	Title	Role	Notes
2014	Thai Niyom: Prince Pom	Prince Pom	Short film
2016	Rong Tao Kaang Sut Tai	Sattawat	Short film
2017	Microlove	Pat	Lead role with South Korea actress Ham Eun-jung

=== Television series ===
Year	English title	Native title	Role	Network	Notes	
2013	Khun Chai Taratorn	คุณชายธราธร	M.R., Flg.Off. Ronapee Jutathep / Khun Chai Pee	Channel 3	Main Cast, in the series Suphapburut Juthathep (สุภาพบุรุษจุฑาเทพ)	
2013	Khun Chai Pawornruj	คุณชายปวรรุจ	M.R., Flg.Off. Ronapee Jutathep / Khun Chai Pee	Channel 3	Main Cast, in the series Suphapburut Juthathep (สุภาพบุรุษจุฑาเทพ)	
2013	Khun Chai Puttipat	คุณชายพุฒิภัทร	M.R., Flg.Off. Ronapee Jutathep / Khun Chai Pee	Channel 3	Main Cast, in the series Suphapburut Juthathep (สุภาพบุรุษจุฑาเทพ)	
2013	Khun Chai Rachanon	คุณชายรัชชานนท์	M.R., Flg.Off. Ronapee Jutathep / Khun Chai Pee	Channel 3	Main Cast, in the series Suphapburut Juthathep (สุภาพบุรุษจุฑาเทพ)	
2013	Khun Chai Ronapee	คุณชายรณพีร์	M.R., Flg.Off. Ronapee Jutathep / Khun Chai Pee	Channel 3	Main Cast, in the series Suphapburut Juthathep (สุภาพบุรุษจุฑาเทพ)	
2015	Ka Badin	ข้าบดินทร์	Luang Surabodin (Haym)	Channel 3	Main Cast, in the series Suphapburut Juthathep (สุภาพบุรุษจุฑาเทพ)	
2016	Piang Chai Kon Nee Mai Chai Poo Wised	เพียงชายคนนี้ไม่ใช่ผู้วิเศษ	Dr. Satawat Winwiwat / Wat	Channel 3	Main Role	
2017	Akom	อาคม	Songklod PritchametSakul (Klom) / Kim	Channel 3	Main Role	
2017	Sai Tarn Hua Jai	สายธารหัวใจ	Narang Jongsawad / Na	Channel 3	Main Role	
2018	Duang Jai Nai Fai Nhao	ดวงใจในไฟหนาว	Yiamyuth	Channel 3	Main Role	
2018	Chaat Seur Pan Mungkorn	ชาติเสือพันธุ์มังกร	Chao Pho Lim Bun Hou / Taeng Tiger / Songward	Channel 3	Main Role	
2019	Klin Kasalong	กลิ่นกาสะลอง	Pratsawin (Future) / Tin Krit (Present) / Doctor Sap (past)	Channel 3	Main Role	
2021	Song Sanaeha	ซุปตาร์2550	Jump	Channel 3	Main Role	Guest
2021	Duang Ta Tee Sam	ดวงตาที่สาม	Treekarn	Channel 3	Main Role	Main role
2022	Suptar 2550	สองเสน่หา	Warit	Channel 3	Main Role	Main role
2023	Pror Rak (Because of Love)	เพราะรัก	Singbodin Suriyasak (Singh)	Channel 3	Main role	
2024				Channel 3		
2024	Jaiphisut	ใจพิสุทธิ์	M.R., Flg.Off. Ronapee Jutathep / Khun Chai Pee	Channel 3	Guest, in the series Duangjai Taewaprom (ดวงใจเทวพรหม)	
2024	Dujapsorn	ดุจอัปสร	M.R., Flg.Off. Ronapee Jutathep / Khun Chai Pee	Channel 3	Guest, in the series Duangjai Taewaprom (ดวงใจเทวพรหม)	
My Secret Zone (Nan Fah Chalalai)	น่าน ฟ้า ชลาลัย	Nan/Nantawan Nonthakitjonan	Main role	Channel 3		
2025				Channel 3		
The Idol Game	เกมไอดอล ล้มตัวแม่	Itthichai (Itt)	Main role	Channel 3		
2026				Channel 3		
Brothers (Song Huajai)	สองหัวใจ	Dom	Main role	Channel 3		
TBA
TBA			Guest			

=== Concerts ===
- Give Me 5 Concert with Mario Maurer, Sukollawat Kanarot, Nadech Kugimiya, Phupoom Pongpanu (2014)
- Channel 3 concert : Love is in the air (2017)

== Awards and nominations ==
Year	Award	Category	Nominated work	Result
2013	11th Seventeen Choice Awards	Male Rising Star	Gentlemen of Jutathep Series	Won
2013	8th OK! Awards	Male Rising Star	Gentlemen of Jutathep Series	Nominated
2013	Weekend Magazine Awards	Top 10 Stars	—N/a	Won
2013	TV3 Fanclub Awards	Male Rising Star	Gentlemen of Jutathep Series	Won
2014	SeeSan Bunterng Awards	Popular Actor of the Year	Gentlemen of Jutathep Series	Nominated
2014	SeeSan Bunterng Awards	Rising Male Star of the Year	Gentlemen of Jutathep Series	Nominated
2014	SeeSan Bunterng Awards	Fantasy Couple of the Year with Chalida Vijitvongthong	Gentlemen of Jutathep Series	Nominated
2014	3rd Daradaily The Great Awards	Male Rising Star of the Year	Gentlemen of Jutathep Series	Nominated
2014	11th Kom Chad Luek Awards	Popular Actor Award	Gentlemen of Jutathep Series	Nominated
2014	8th Kazz Awards	Popular Actor Award	Gentlemen of Jutathep Series	Nominated
2015	SeeSan Bunterng Awards	Best Actor	The King's Servant	Won
2015	TV3 Fanclub Awards	Most Popular Actor	The King's Servant	Nominated
2016	5th Daradaily The Great Awards	Best Drama Actor of the Year	The King's Servant	Nominated
2016	6th Mthai Top-Talk Awards	Top-Talk About Actor	The King's Servant	Nominated
2016	30th TV Gold Awards	Outstanding Actor	The King's Servant	Nominated
2016	13th Kom Chad Luek Awards	Best Actor	The King's Servant	Nominated
2016	13th Kom Chad Luek Awards	Popular Actor Award	The King's Servant	Nominated
2016	2nd TrueLife Awards	Leading Actor of the Year	The King's Servant	Nominated
2016	7th Nataraja Awards	Best Leading Actor	The King's Servant	Nominated
2016	Maya Awards	Excellent Actor (Drama)	The King's Servant	Nominated
2016	Maya Awards	Charming Star (Male)	—N/a	Nominated
2016	11th OK! Awards	Female Heartthrob	—N/a	Won
2017	6th Daradaily The Great Awards	Best Drama Actor of the Year	Just a Man, Not a Magician	Won
2017	6th Daradaily The Great Awards	Cool Guy of the Year	—N/a	Nominated
