= Love Destiny (2018 TV series) =

2018 Thai historical television series

- Genre: Romance; Comedy; Drama; Historical; Time travel
- Based on: Bupphesanniwat by Rompaeng
- Written by: Salaya Sukanivatt
- Directed by: Pawat Panangkasri
- Starring: Ranee Campen; Thanavat Vatthanaputi; Louis Scott; Susira Nanna; Parama Imanothai
- Country of origin: Thailand
- Original language: Thai
- No. of episodes: 15 + 3 special episodes

Production
- Producer: Arunocha Bhanubandhu
- Running time: 150 minutes
- Production company: Broadcast Thai Television

Original release
- Network: Channel 3
- Release: February 21 – April 11, 2018

Related
- Love Destiny 2; Love Destiny (2026)

Love Destiny (Thai: บุพเพสันนิวาส; RTGS: Bupphesanniwat; IPA: [bùp.pʰeː.sǎn.ní.wâ:t]) is a 2018 Thai historical television series that originally aired on Channel 3 from February 21 to April 11, 2018. The 15-episode series contains elements of romance, comedy, and time travel. Starring Ranee Campen and Thanawat Wattanaputi, Love Destiny was a major hit in Thailand and gained popularity across Asia and contributed to a rise of tourists in the filming locations. Its success has been attributed to its elaborate screenplay, costumes, and locations.

The lakorn, set in Ayutthaya Kingdom, during the reign of King Narai, is an adaptation of the novel of the same name by Rompaeng, the penname of Chanyawi Somprida. The novel got the Seven book award in 2010 and was adapted into a television drama for the first time in this series. The television adaptation was done by Broadcast Thai Television, the scriptwrier was Sanlaya, and the director was Pawat Panangsiri.

== Synopsis ==
While traveling back home from a school excavation trip in Ayutthaya, Ketsurang (Ranee Campen), a history student and her friend, Rueangrit (Prama Imanothai), got into a car accident. Ketsurang wakes up in the body of Karaket (การะเกด), the daughter of the ruler of Phitsanulok who was living in Ayutthaya, the capital of the Ayutthaya Kingdom, during the reign of King Narai (1656–1688). She lives in the residence of King Narai's chief astrologer, Phraya Horathibodi (พระยาโหราธิบดี), who is the father of her fiancé, Dech (Thanawat Wattanaputi), a foreign ministry official holding the noble title of Muen Sunthon Thewa. The eccentric and goofy behavior of Ketsurang shocks everyone, but her kindness changes their attitudes towards her, eventually winning their hearts and minds. She amazes the people with her knowledge of the historical events of the era and questions the veracity of the knowledge she had learned in the future.

The drama also includes the Ayutthayan embassy accredited to the court of King Louis XIV of France, with Pan as the ambassador, in addition to the successful enterprise of Phra Phet Racha, King Narai's xenophobic regent, to seize power and get rid of the Christians in the kingdom. The coup was supported by the Buddhist clergy and Narai's own daughter, Princess Sudawadi, and leads to the execution of Phaulkon, who held the position of Prime Counsellor of Ayutthaya and assumed the Thai noble title of Chao Phraya Wichayen.

== Cast ==
=== Main ===
- Ranee Campen as Karaket / Ketsurang
- Thanavat Vatthanaputi as Dech, son of Chaophraya Horathibodi and Champa
- Louis Scott as Constantine Phaulkon
- Surira Angelina Naenna as Maria Guyomar de Pinha, Phaulkon's wife
- Parama Imanotai as Rueang / Rueangrit
- Kannarun Wongkajornklai as Lady Chanwat, daughter of Lek and Nim

=== Supporting ===
- Praptpadol Suwanbang as King Narai
- Sarut Vijittranon as Phra Phet Racha, Narai's regent
- Jirayu Thantrakul as Luang Sorasak, Phra Phet Racha's son
- Nirut Sirijanya as Chaophraya Horathibodi, Narai's chief astrologer
- Chamaiporn Jaturaput as Lady Champa, Chaophraya Horathibodi's wife
- Surasak Chaiat as Kosa Lek, Narai's foreign minister
- Chartchai Ngamsan as Kosa Pan, Lek's younger brother
- Rachanee Siralert as Lady Nim, Lek's wife
- Aumpa Phusit as Prik, Champa's attendant
- Vimolphan Chaleejunghran as Chuan, Champa's attendant
- Janya Thanasawaangkoun as Phin, Karaket's attendant
- Ramida Prapatsanobon as Yaem, Karaket's attendant
- Witsarut Himmarat as Choi, Dech's attendant

=== Special appearances ===
- Paweena Chariffsakul as Ketsurang's mother
- Banjerdsri Yamabhaya as Ketsurang's grandmother
- Tachaya Prathumwan as Phra Pi, Narai's adopted son
- Natanop Chuenhirun as Si Prat, Dech's older brother
- Thongkao Pattarachokechai as Maria's father
- Suzana Renaud as Clara, Maria's attendant
- Wariya Thaisaet as Claudia, Maria's attendant
- Watcharachai Sunthornsiri as Achan Chi Pa Khao (White-Robed Master)
- Wiksawaweet Wongwannlop as Luang Si Yot, Narai's minister
- Peter Tuinstra as Simon de la Loubère
- Natticha Chantaravareelekha as Kaew

== Original soundtrack ==
- "Bupphesanniwat" (บุพเพสันนิวาส), opening theme by Saranyu Winaipanit
- "Phiang Sop Ta" (เพียงสบตา; "Just Eye Contact"), ending theme by Sarunrat Dean
- "Ochao Oei" (ออเจ้าเอย; "Thou Oh Thou") by Pol Nopvichai
  - Special version by Thanavat Vatthanaputi
- "Thoe No Thoe" (เธอหนอเธอ; "You Oh You") by Wathiya Ruangnirat
  - Special version by Ranee Campen

== Ratings ==
In this table, the blue numbers represent the lowest ratings and the red numbers represent the highest ratings.

Ep.	Original broadcast date	Average audience share (AGB Nielsen)	
Ep.	Original broadcast date	Nationwide	Bangkok
1	February 21, 2018	3.4%	5.8%
2	February 22, 2018	4.8%	7.5%
3	February 28, 2018	7.3%	11.6%
4	March 1, 2018	8.2%	13.0%
5	March 7, 2018	11.4%	16.0%
6	March 8, 2018	12.6%	19.8%
7	March 14, 2018	14.8%	20.5%
8	March 15, 2018	15.5%	22.8%
9	March 21, 2018	16.0%	23.4%
10	March 22, 2018	16.0%	21.4%
11	March 28, 2018	17.4%	22.6%
12	March 29, 2018	17.4%	23.9%
13	April 4, 2018	17.4%	21.8%
14	April 5, 2018	17.9%	23.9%
15	April 11, 2018	18.6%	23.4%
Average		13.3%	18.5%

=== Specials ===
Ep.	Original broadcast date	Average audience share (AGB Nielsen)	
Ep.	Original broadcast date	Nationwide	Bangkok
Special 1	April 12, 2018	10.1%	12.6%
Special 2	April 18, 2018	8.6%	12.3%
Special 3	April 19, 2018	8.0%	12.5%
Average		9.1%	12.5%

== Sequels ==
- Love Destiny: The Movie – spin-off movie (2022)
- Love Destiny 2 – sequel series (2023)
- Love Destiny – a boys' love remake of the original series (2026)
