= Cubic (TV series) =

- คิวบิก
- Starring: Tanin Manoonsilp; Chalida Vijitvongthong; Voravit Fuangarome; Parada Chutchavalchotikul; Artit Tangwiboonpanit; Nuttanicha Dungwattanawanich
- Country of origin: Thailand
- Original language: Thai
- No. of episodes: 16

Production
- Production location: Thailand

Original release
- Network: Channel 3
- Release: March 8 – April 12, 2014

Cubic (Thai: คิวบิก) is a Thai drama that stars Tanin Manoonsilp and Chalida Vijitvongthong. It aired on Channel 3 on every Friday, Saturday and Sunday from 8 March 2014 to 12 April 2014.

== Synopsis ==
Ruthainak (Chalida Vijitvongthong) is the smart, resilient, sharp-tongued younger sister. Her older sister, Nunthaka (Selina Pearce), is beautiful, but spoiled and sheltered. In financial difficulties, the girls' father asks a member of the Hong Kong mafia, Lin Lang Sur (Tanin Manoonsilp), for a large loan. He pledges Nunthaka as collateral to secure the debt. Panicked when he is unable to repay the money, he flees with Nunthaka. When Ruthainak is taken to Hong Kong to confront the furious mafioso, she offers to work to pay off her family's debt. In the beginning, Ruthainak and Lin Lang Sur don't get along, but slowly the mob boss begins to fall for the clever girl. Later in series, her birth truth is being revealed along with that the real reason behind replacing her with Nunthaka.

== Cast ==
=== Main cast ===
- Bomb Tanin Manoonsilp as Lin Lan Ser - a mob boss and the current president of Chai Hong Group in Hong Kong (Taiwan in the drama). He is known for being rude and selfish and the reason most people is scared of him and is always in truce with his cousin Lin Puey In. He fell in love at first sight with Nan and plans to take Nan as a payment for her father's debt, but Nan's father fled together with Nan that drove him to take Nak as a hostage, but later on falls in love with Nak instead.
- Mint Chalida Vijitvongthong as Ruthainak "Nak" Ritthivong - younger sister of Nan who is taken as hostage by Lin Lan Ser after both her father and sister fled the scene leaving her by herself. She is later on taken to Hong Kong (Taiwan in the drama) to work in order to pay for her father's debt. She is shown to be very intelligent with an IQ of 153 and a very cheerful and foul mouth especially towards Lin Lan Ser and the only person who can talk back to Lin Lan Ser since most people is scared of him and is scared to die. Though always bickers with Lin Lan Ser, she also cares deeply for him like the shown when Lin Lan Ser almost died after getting hit by a gunshot. As the series progress she is still clueless about Lin Lan Ser's feelings towards her nor her feelings towards Lin Lan Ser.
- Not Voravit Fuangarome as Zhongxin - Lin Lan Ser's right-hand man and his most trustful and reliable person. He is shown to have no emotions at all and will only do what Lin Lan Ser had told him and things that will benefit both Lin Lan Ser and his company Chai Hong Group. Despite being shown as a person with no emotions at all, it is hinted that he has some romantic feelings towards Fang Mei Jing, who happens to be Lin Lan Ser's "woman" and the reason he does not approach her. He is also one of the few people besides Danny that knows about Lin Lan Ser's feelings towards Ruthainak.
- First Parada Chutchavalchotikul as Danny Tapia - Ruthainak's best friend and Carlos Tapia's son. He is smart and very handsome and dislikes Lin Lan Ser very much and often take advantage of Ruthainak being clueless of making Lin Lan Ser mad nor jealous, since Lin Lan Ser had some thoughts that he likes Ruthainak and that the both of them are dating. He is also the one that always helps Ruthainak in her "missions" and other things that make him argue with Ruthainak but in the end helps her.
- Bank Artit Tangwiboonpanit as Lin Pei Yin - Lin Lan Ser's cousin and a very short tempered person who always throws a tantrum. Just like Lin Lan Ser with Nan, he too fell in love at first sight with a woman named Meena, who is also a Thai woman just like Nan. He later on want to take her hostage, due to her father owing him 20 million Hong Kong Dollars.
- Nychaa Nuttanicha Dungwattanawanich as Meena "Min" - Lin Peuy In's debtor and love interest. She is very beautiful and the reason Lin Pei Yin was caught in a love at first sight with her.

=== Supporting cast ===
- Noey Chotika Wongwilas as Fang Mei Jing - Lin Lan Ser's "woman" and a model in Hong Kong. She is very beautiful and kind as well and unknown to her Jongsing holds romantic feelings for her.
- Tah Warit Tipgomut as Lang Yong Wen - the series's main antagonist who hides his real dark intentions behind his fake kind nature. He later on killed his wife, Bai Ling, after Bai Ling had discovered his ugly doings.
- Selina Pearce as Nanthaka "Nan" Ritthivong - Ruthainak's elder sister and the love interest of Lin Lan Ser. She is very beautiful yet her personality is the complete opposite of Ruthainak, since she is very lady like. She is announced as Lin Lan Ser's woman but before Lin Lan Ser could get her, her father had escaped with her and left Ruthainak all alone. She later came back together with her father and finally met Lin Lan Ser, and through her joy, Lin Lan Ser is the man that she had fallen in love with at first sight.
