= Suphapburut Juthathep =

Thai television series (2013)

- Also known as: Gentlemen of Juthathep; Khun Chai Juthathep
- Thai: สุภาพบุรุษจุฑาเทพ
- Literally: Gentlemen of Juthathep
- Genre: Romantic; Melodrama; Family; Historical
- Based on: Suphapburut Juthathep
- Written by: Nara; Romkaew; Gaotam; Sornklin; Praenut
- Screenplay by: Natthiya Sirakornwilai; Sanctuary; Pranpramoon; Pimthana; Nattawan Roongwongpanit
- Directed by: Krit Sukramongkol; Somjing Srisuparp; Yutthana Leopanpaiboon; Pongpat Wachirabunjong; Chatchai Plengpanich
- Starring: Warintorn Panhakarn; Ranida Techasit; Thanavat Vatthanaputi; Nittha Jirayungyurn; Jirayu Tangsrisuk; Ranee Campen; Tanin Manoonsilp; Natapohn Tameeruks; James Ma; Chalida Vijitvongthong
- Theme music composer: Narongvit Techatanavat
- Opening theme: Real love over the time
- Country of origin: Thailand
- Original language: Thai
- No. of seasons: 1
- No. of episodes: 55

Production
- Producers: Yossinee Na Nakorn; Somjing Srisuparp; Thitima Sangkapitak; Tanya Wachirabunjong; Chatchai Plengpanich
- Running time: ~150 minutes / episode
- Production companies: Maker Y; GOOD Feeling; No Problem; Act Art Generation; Metta and Mahaniyom

Original release
- Network: Channel 3
- Release: March 15 – July 7, 2013

Related
- Porn Prom Eonla Weng; Dao Raung; Duangjai Dhevaprom

Suphapburut Juthathep (Thai: สุภาพบุรุษจุฑาเทพ, romanized: Suphapburut Juthathep, lit. 'Gentlemen of Juthathep') is a Thai lakorn series which consists of 5 dramas: Khun Chai Taratorn, Khun Chai Pawornruj, Khun Chai Puttipat, Khun Chai Rachanon and Khun Chai Ronapee. The television series is based on a novel series of the same name. It was made to celebrate ThaiTV3's 43rd anniversary.

The series was produced by 5 different companies, producers and directors. It was first aired on every Friday–Sunday, 20.15 to 22.45 (TST) since June 15 until July 7, 2013. Later, it was rerun two times on March 6 – August 20, 2015 and on January 31 – July 14, 2017, respectively.

The series received the huge response and advanced the careers of the lead actors, most of whom were newcomers to television drama. In June 2013, a statistic was reported that over a thousand parents named their children with the name of the characters since the release of the series.

In 2015, the publisher and the writers of Suphapburut Juthathep's novels announced that a sequel would be published, called Duangjai Dhevaprom. The sequels are the stories of the five Mom Rajawongse's children, with the Dewaprom's descendants as the main characters and using their names as the books' titles.

In 2020, It was confirmed by Channel 3 that they are going to make Duangjai Thewaprom as a series, produced by the same production company and producers with Suphapburut Juthathep, and was reported that they already started casting the main characters.

== Plot ==
The series is the love and relationship story of five Juthathep half-brothers, born as Mom Rajawongse (M.R.) (Thai: คุณชาย, romanized: Khun Chai), starting in 1957. Although they have different mothers, they love each other deeply and have a close relationship. After their parents died when they were young, they were raised by the grandmothers, Mom Aiet, and Aiet's younger sister, Grandma Oon.

Their fathers had a promise with his best friend and lifesaver, M.R. Taewapan Dhevaprom, in the past. He wanted at least one of his sons to marry one of Taewapan's daughters. Made five of them a duty to keep the promise.

== Production ==
Before filming the series, the male lead casts, Warintorn, Thanavat, Jirayu, Tanin and James, had to go through 9 missions for preparing to be M.R. The missions were made as a variety show called Channel 3 Superstars and aired on every Sunday, 14.30 (TST), started on November 4, 2012. The show aired total 12 episode, including 11 episodes of 9 missions and the final episode of the grand opening of the series. The list of 12 episodes are :

The list of Channel 3 Superstars episodes
No. Episode	Title	Missions	Guests
1	Introduction, real M.L., and personality test	Introduction and practice the appropriate personality	M.L. Panadda Diskul; Jindarat Chumsai Na Ayuthaya Ph.D., specialist of personality
2	Dressing	Choosing the outfit for different events	Kritsanarath Jindawong, a specialist in fashion
3	Table manners	Learning about the right manners at the table and really practising	Soraya Bunnak, specialist of table manners; Sririta Jensen, an actress
4	Physical fitness test	Shooting, Physical strength test, Tower jumping, Rappelling	Maj. Komsant Rattanangkoon, a Royal Thai Army
5	Ballroom dancing	Passed ballroom dance with the dancing couple	Watcharakorn Seuaseuppan and M.L. Warapa Chumpol, former ballroom dancing athletes; Yutthana Leopanpaiboon, a director
6	Acting	Acting with a role in the given drama	Rossukon Kongket, acting teacher; Tanachapan Buranacheevavilai, radio host
7	Occupation Part 1	Get to know and learning careers of the characters	Raweewan Sangwan, professional archaeologist of Fine Arts Department; Waropart Wongjaturapat, the head of the Landscape Architecture Group of the Fine Arts Department; Sema Baopoonthong, professional civil engineer
8	Occupation Part 2	Get to know and learning careers of the characters	Lt.Col, M.D. Nut Krairojananan, Emergency surgeon at Phramongkutklao Hospital; Thani Thongpakdee, Ambassador and Permanent Representative; Sqn.Ldr. Narach Prongsala, Thai air force training officer; Korpbun Sangmanee, professional diplomat; Seiji Kojima, former Ambassador Extraordinary and Plenipotentiary Embassy of Japan in Thailand
9	Community service 1	Making a weir, tourist police volunteer, and volunteer at the hospital	Kittiya Nunloey, head of the Public Relations Department of Wildlife Sanctuary Mae Chee; Pol.Lt.Col. Arun Prompan, inspector of Pattaya Tourist Police Station; Darunee Sassanakul, professional nurse at Phra Nang Klao Hospital
10	Community service 2	Volunteer at the temple, volunteer at the hospital	Mahaprasert Chantaviro, abbot of Bang Pla Mho temple; Jeerawut Thongyot, ambulance nurse at Samut Prakarn Hospital
11	Beautification	Complete face and body caring, done the activity at Saena Nikom School	Benjarat Jitrpratum, specialist in beauty and beauty products of Wuttisak Clinic
12	Grand Opening	–	–

For filming location, Channel 3 invests in building Juthathep palace with a budget of 10 million baht, permanently located at Nong Khaem District, Bangkok, and also able to film other series.

== Broadcast order ==
The broadcast order of Suphapburut Juthathep
Title	Main casts	First airing date	Last airing date	Number of episodes	Notes
Khun Chai Taratorn	Warintorn Panhakarn and Ranida Techasit	March 15, 2013	April 5, 2013	10	The last episode aired around 30 minutes and Khun Chai Pawornruj aired afterward.
Khun Chai Pawornruj	Thanavat Vatthanaputi and Nittha Jirayungyurn	April 5, 2013	May 3, 2013	13	The first episode aired around 120 minutes after the end of Khun Chai Taratorn. The last episode aired around 60 minutes, and Khun Chai Pawornruj aired afterward.
Khun Chai Puttipat	Jirayu Tangsrisuk and Ranee Campen	May 3, 2013	May 24, 2013	10	The first episode aired around 90 minutes after the end of Khun Chai Pawornruj. The last episode aired around 65 minutes, and Khun Chai Rachanon aired afterward.
Khun Chai Rachanon	Tanin Manoonsilp and Natapohn Tameeruks	May 24, 2013	June 15, 2013	11	The first episode aired around 85 minutes after the end of Khun Chai Puttipat. The last episode aired for around 60 minutes, and Khun Chai Ronapee aired afterward.
Khun Chai Ronapee	James Ma and Chalida Vijitvongthong	June 15, 2013	July 7, 2013	11	The last episode aired around 90 minutes after Khun Chai Rachanon.

== Main characters ==
=== Juthathep family ===
Juthathep family tree

Phra Ong Chao Wipawasu Juthathep	Mom Aiet Juthathep Na Ayudhya	Grandma Oon
M.C. Witchakorn Juthathep
M.R. Ubolwan Juthathep	Mom Cheongnang Juthathep Na Ayudhya	Mom Yok Juthathep Na Ayudhya
M.R. Taratorn Juthathep	[M.R. Pawornruj Juthathep	M.R. Puttipat Juthathep, M.D.	M.R. Rachanon Juthathep	M.R., Flg.Off. Ronapee Juthathep

Family tree reference :

- M.R. Taratorn Juthathep / Khun Chai Yai (Note: M.R. can informally called as 'Khun Chai' for males and 'Khun Ying' for females.) — Warintorn Panhakarn

He is the oldest brother, the first son of M.C. Witchakorn and M.R. Ubolwan. His parents died when the five were young, so he is responsible for taking care of the younger brothers.

- M.R. Pawornruj Juthathep / Khun Chai Ruj — Thanavat Vatthanaputi

He is the only son of M.C. Witchakorn and Mom Cheongnang, who used to be a servant. And that is the reason why Grandma Oon always nagged him a lot. He works as a diplomat, Second Secretary at the Thai Embassy in Thailand and later moves to Switzerland.

- M.R. Puttipat Juthathep, M.D. / Khun Chai Pat — Jirayu Tangsrisuk

The Neurosurgeon at the public hospital, the first son of M.C. Witchakorn with Mom Yok. He is a logical thinker who always decides everything according to reason, also popular with the patients and nurses at his workplace because of his good looks and smart body.

- M.R. Rachanon Juthathep / Kun Chai Lek — Tanin Manoonsilp

He is the fourth son of M.C. Witchakorn but is the second son of him with Mom Yok, so he is a brother of the same blood with M.R. Puttipat. He studied abroad and works as a civil engineer with the dream of developing the distant region.

- M.R., Flg.Off. Ronapee Juthathep / Khun Chai Phee — James Ma

The royal Thai Air Force fighter pilot, is on duty at Wing 1, 13th Fighter Squadron of F-86F aircraft. (Note: Wing 1, 13th Fighter Squadron, used to be located at Don Mueang International Airport.) He is the last child of M.C. Witchakorn and M.R. Ubolwan, the youngest of five brothers. He has loved aircraft since young, so he always wanted to be a pilot.

- Mom Aiet Juthathep Na Ayudhya — Jaruwan Panyopas

She married Phra Ong Chao Wipawasu Juthathep, the origin of Juthathep. She has a younger sister, Grandma Oon, who hasn't married and moved to live with her at Juthathep Palace. She and her husband have one child, M.C. Witchakorn, and have five grandsons. After her son and in-laws died, she and Oon had to raise their grandsons by themself.

But before M.C. Witchakorn's death, he once made a promise with M.R. Taewapan Dhevaprom, which would like either of the both's children would be married because M.R. Taewapan had saved his life. So, she and Oon need to force their grandsons to keep the promise.

- Grandma Oon — Duangta Tungkamani

She is the younger sister of Mom Aiet, and later moved to live with her sister and help Aiet raise the grandsons. She hasn't married because she had a bad experience with love and her fiancé in the past. Her fiancé broke the engagement and left her to be with the servant, so she hates all servants who become the wives of the royalty. As a result, she always nagged M.R. Pawornruj and loves him less than the other grandsons. On the other hand, Oon loves M.R. Ronapee the most because his personality is like to be loved.

=== Dhevaprom family ===
Taewaprom family tree

Mom Chao Jakkrarin Dhevaprom	Mom Ploy Dhevaprom
Unknown	M.R. Taewapan Dhevaprom	M.R., Maj.Gen. Anupan Dhevaprom	M.R. Daraneenuch Dhevaprom (Maiden name: Kittiwong)	M.R. Worapan Dhevaprom	Unknown
M.L. Kedsara Dhevaprom	M.L. Marathee Dhevaprom	M.L. Wilairampa Dhevaprom	M.L., Flg.Off. Chatchavee Dhevaprom	M.L. Sineenuch Dhevaprom	M.L. Kratin Dhevaprom

- M.L. Kedsara Dhevaprom — Nutwara Vongvasana

She is the oldest of three daughters of M.R. Taewapan Dhevaprom. She is a tower of strength for her family, finding money for every expense.

- M.L. Marathee Dhevaprom — Chotika Wongwilas

She desperately wanted to be Juthathep's in-law, because she was growing up being told by her father that she would be Juthathep's in-law in the future. She is also a nurse and works at the same hospital as M.R. Puttipat.

- M.L. Wilairampa Dhevaprom — Esther Supreeleela

She is the youngest child of M.R. Taewapan and is close with M.L. Marathee, and that makes both have similar personalities. She is a college student trying to get the attention of M.R. Ronapee without considering the method.

- M.L. Kratin Dhevaprom — Sumonthip Hsu

The only child of M.R. Worapan, the youngest brother of M.R. Taewapan, she was raised in Southern Thailand because her father runs a rubber plantation. She is a native girl and doesn't want to marry M.R. Pawornruj. She is forced to move to Bangkok and is ordered to prepare herself for being a bride.

- M.L. Sineenuch Dhevaprom — Pimthong Vachirakom

An only daughter of M.R. Anupan and M.R. Daraneenuch Dhevaprom, she was raised by spoiling from her mother. Actually, she is an obedient and good-hearted person, but she was told since young that she is M.R. Rachanon's fiancée. Consequently, she does everything to draw attention from him.

- M.L., Flg.Off. Chatchavee Dhevaprom / King Rangsiman — Jaron Sorat

The stepson of M.R. Anupan, who was insulted by M.R. Daraneenuch result of jealousy. He is a fighter pilot under the Royal Thai Air Force and also the best friend of M.R. Ronapee.

- M.R. Taewapan Dhevaprom — Dilok Thongwattana

He is the head of the family and the owner of Dhevaprom Palace. In the past, he once saved M.C. Witchakorn Juthathep's life from an accident, which made both of them promise about their children's marriage.

== Khun Chai Taratorn ==
Khun Chai Taratorn (Thai: คุณชายธราธร, romanized: Khun Chai Taratorn, lit. 'Mom Rajawongse Taratorn') is a Thai lakorn, the first drama in the series, based on a novel series of the same name. Its novel is written by Nara, the drama is produced by Maker Y Group Co., Ltd. Yossinee Na Nakorn is a producer, and the director is Krit Sukramongkol. It was first aired on every Friday–Sunday, 20.15 to 22.45 (TST) from June 15 until April 5, 2013.

=== Synopsis ===
M.R. Taratorn Juthathep, the oldest brother, takes the responsibility to take care of his younger brothers after the death of his parents. So, he is the first one who is responsible for his father's promise, which is to marry M.L. Kedsara Dhevaprom.

M.L. Raweeramphai or Maprang, the girl who familiar with Juthathep brothers since young. She secretly falls in love with M.R. Taratorn but couldn't expose her true feelings.

The love and relationship between the three have developed and meet the crossroads while they are in the middle of the brigandage of antiquities, altogether with Chinnakorn, who is Taratorn's colleague and secretly loves Kedsara.

=== Cast ===
==== Main ====
- Warintorn Panhakarn as M.R. Taratorn Juthathep / Khun Chai Yai
  - Nutwinont Sutiprasit as young M.R. Taratorn

An Archaeology at Thai Fine Arts Department and also a history special professor at the university. He is the oldest brother, the first son of M.C. Witchakorn and M.R. Ubolwan. His parents died when the five were young, so he is responsible for taking care of the younger brothers. He is a warm-hearted, calm, straightforward, and responsible person. He is forced to marry M.L. Kedsara Dhevaprom.

- Ranida Techasit as M.L. Raweeramphai Sawasward / Maprang / Tawan (disguise)
  - Napattanan Nimjirawat as young M.L. Raweeramphai

She is a Journalistic college student at the same university as M.R. Taratorn, the only child of M.R. Artittayarangsri. She was born in England and moved back to Thailand at a very young age, so she didn't have any friends in Thailand. M.R. Taratorn became her friend, and that made her secretly fall in love with him since then. She is a bright, optimistic, honest, and confident person. Raweerampai is also interested in archaeology like her father.

- Nutwara Vongvasana as M.L. Kedsara Dhevaprom / Khun Ked / Kong Kiet (disguise)

M.L. Kedsara Dhevaprom is the eldest daughter of M.R. Taewapan. After her father’s gambling causes financial difficulties for the family, she supports them by operating a dessert shop behind Dhevaprom Palace. She wishes to live independently.

- Suriyont Arunwattanakoon as Chinnakorn / Professor Chinnakorn

The special professor of archeology, a M.R. Taratorn's colleague, and the only child of the gold shop owner. He is a warm, kind, and honest person. He falls in love with M.L. Kedsara at first sight and always stands by her side by being a good consultant.

==== Supporting ====
===== Juthathep family =====
- Thanavat Vatthanaputi as M.R. Pawornruj Juthathep / Khun Chai Ruj
  - Kantaon Luengcharoenkit as young M.R. Pawornruj
- Jirayu Tangsrisuk as M.R. Puttipat Juthathep / Khun Chai Pat
  - Kornpipat Kritsanasap as young M.R. Puttipat
- Tanin Manoonsilp as M.R. Rachanon Juthathep / Khun Chai Lek
  - Komkrit Sansri as young M.R. Rachanon
- James Ma as Flg.Off., M.R. Ronapee Juthathep / Khun Chai Pee
  - Anda Intarit as young M.R. Ronapee
- Jaruwan Panyopas as Mom Aiet Juthathep Na Ayudhya
- Duangta Tungkamanee as Grandma Oon

===== Sawaswad family =====
- Toon Hiranyasap as M.R. Artittayarangsri Sawaswad / Khun Chai Artit

The father of M.L. Raweeramphai. He is a kind, understandable, and modern father. He is the senior of M.R. Taratorn at the Fine Arts Department, and both are very determined to protect and preserve the national antiquities. He also has a Cardiovascular disease but insists on going to the archeological survey.

- Supranee Jaroenpol as Mom Kanlaya Sawaswad / Khun Ying Kanlaya

The mother of M.L. Raweerampai. She is kind, loves, and cares about her family. They raise their only child with the reasoning of modern parents.

===== Dhevaprom family =====
- Dilok Thongwattana as M.R. Taewapan Dhevaprom / Khun Chai Taewapan
- Chotika Wongwilas as M.L. Marathee Dhevaprom / Khun Marathee
- Esther Supreeleela as M.L. Wilairampa Dhevaprom / Khun Rampa

==== Others ====
- Oliver Poupart as Sir Edward Summerset

A foreigner who came to Thailand to steal the antiquities. He disguised himself as the investor for research and followed the survey team to the historic site.

- Prasart Thong-aram as Oonsri / Pran Oonsri (Thai: พราน, romanized: Pran, lit. 'Hunter')

A hunter who works and navigates the route for M.R. Artittayarangsri's survey team.

- Kitkasem McFadden as Eric

The leader of the gang of thieves, hired by Sir Edward.

- Prappadol Suwanbang as Som / Pran Som (Thai: พราน, romanized: Pran, lit. 'Hunter')

A hunter who works with Eric.

- Chaleumpol Tikumpornteerawong as Udom

A college student who is a member of the survey team.

- Pramote Thianchaigerdsilp as Mana

A college student who is a member of the survey team.

- Thitiphan Suriyawitch as Piti

A college student who is a member of the survey team.

- Napol Promsuwan as Manit

An officer who facilitates M.R. Artittayarangsri's survey team.

- Weerachai Hatthakowit as Tan

A college student who is a member of the survey team.

- Savakorn Tiyasawaskul as Sophita

M.L. Raweerampai's friend.

- Panyaporn Srisawas as Darachai

M.L. Raweerampai's friend.

- Narisa Promsupa as Yam

M.L. Kedsara's servant and helper.

- Thanuphong Sakthanawat as Thanom

Juthathep Palace's chauffeur.

- Usanee Peungpa as Waew

Taewaprom Palace's servant.

- Natthanee Sitthisaman as Somsri

Mom Aiet's servant.

- Thiparin Yodthanasawas as Jaew

Juthathep Palace's servant.

==== Cameo appearances ====
- Songsit Roongnophakunsri as M.C. Witchakorn Juthathep / Than Chai Wit

An only child of Mom Aiet and the father of five M.R.

- Chintara Sukapatana as M.R. Ubolwan Juthathep

The first wife of M.C. Witchakorn, the mother of M.R. Taratorn and M.R. Ronapee.

- Jariya Anfone as Mom Cheongnang Juthathep Na Ayudhya

The second wife of M.C. Witchakorn, the mother of M.R. Pawornruj.

- Piyawadee Maleenont as Mom Yok Juthathep Na Ayudhya

The third wife of M.C. Witchakorn, the mother of M.R. Puttipat and M.R. Rachanon. She is the daughter of a Chinese magnate.

- Rujira Chuaykua as Ubol

A guest at the M.R.'s coming back party at Juthathep palace, who was dancing with M.R. Rachanon.

- Prima Rachata as Dararai

Darachai's mother and a make-up artist and a barber.

- Radklao Amaradit as Sopee

Sophita's mother and a tailor.

- Wasant Uttamayotin as Cha-moi

The personality specialist.

- Parin Wikran as Chinnakorn's father
- Warapan Nguitragool as Chinnakorn's mother

=== Original soundtracks ===
No.	Title	Lyrics	Music	Artist	Length
1.	"รักแท้อยู่เหนือกาลเวลา" (Real love over the time)	Narongvit Techatanavat	Jakkrit Makkanasoh	Pongkool Suebsuengl	3:43
2.	"ลมหายใจเท่านั้นที่รู้" (Only breath knows)	Narongvit Techatanavat	Jakkrit Makkanasoh	Peerapat Taerawheong	3:47
3.	"เก็บรัก" (Hide the love)	Surapol Tonavanik	Weerapat Ung-amporn	Wathiya Ruayniratana	3:52
Total length:					11:22

== Khun Chai Pawornruj ==
Khun Chai Pawornruj (Thai: คุณชายปวรรุจ, romanized: Khun Chai Pawornruj, lit. 'Mom Rajawongse Pawornruj' is a Thai lakorn, the second drama in the series. Its novel is written by Romkaew, the drama is produced by Good Feeling Co., Ltd. Somjing Srisuparp is a producer and director. It was first aired on every Friday–Sunday, 20.15 to 22.45 (TST) from April 5 until May 3, 2013.

=== Synopsis ===
The diplomat, M.R. Pawornruj Juthathep whose work life is progressing well. He is not strictly responsible for the promise because he is the son of Mom Cheongnang, who used to be a servant of M.R. Ubolwan, which makes Grandma Oon shower him less love compared to his brothers.

In Switzerland, he meets M.C. Wanrasa, who disguises herself as a daughter of a merchant traveling there.

As that love is progressing relatively well, but the end of such joy eventually starts. Love between a young man of a humble mother and a young woman born as a princess is considered rather unfitting in such a society. Moreover, Pawornruj is set to marry M.L. Kratin Dhevaprom.

=== Cast ===
==== Main ====
- Thanavat Vatthanaputi as M.R. Pawornruj Juthathep / Khun Chai Ruj
  - Kantapon Luengcharoenkit as young M.R. Pawornruj

A diplomat who works at Ministry of Foreign Affairs as Second Secretary in Thailand, the only son of M.C. Witchakorn and Mom Cheongnang, who used to be a servant. He is calm, polite, wise, and good at negotiation. Deeply in the bottom of his heart, he thinks that he is just the son of a servant, doesn't equal his brothers, so he always does everything for the sake of his brothers.

- Nittha Jirayungyurn as M.C. Wanrasa Arunrat / Tan Ying Rasa / Than Ying Taew / Rasa (disguise)
  - Parnrada Kachennukul as young M.C. Wanrasa

An only child of Phra Ong Chao Chatarun Arunrat and M.C. Wirisa. She is a kind, stubborn, determined, and brave person. Grandma Oon once raised her when she was young, and she used to play with the Juthathep brothers. She has a fiancé named M.C. Phanutatsanai. She went to Switzerland to surprise her fiancé and traveled freely.

==== Supporting ====
===== People around Pawornruj =====
- Warintorn Panhakarn as M.R. Taratorn Juthathep / Khun Chai Yai
  - Nutwinont Sutiprasit as young M.R. Taratorn
- Ranida Techasit as M.L. Raweeramphai Sawasward / Maprang
- Jirayu Tangsrisuk as M.R. Puttipat Juthathep / Khun Chai Pat
  - Kornpipat Kritsanasap as young M.R. Puttipat
- Tanin Manoonsilp as M.R. Rachanon Juthathep / Khun Chai Lek
  - Komkrit Sansri as young M.R. Rachanon
- James Ma as Flg.Off., M.R. Ronapee Juthathep / Khun Chai Pee
  - Anda Intarit as young M.R. Ronapee
- Jaruwan Panyopas as Mom Aiet Juthathep Na Ayudhya
- Duangta Tungkamani as Grandma Oon
- Thana Chatborirak as Pakorn

M.R. Pawornruj's best friend lives in Switzerland.

- Atthama Cheevanitchpan as Waddao

M.R. Pawornruj's ex-girlfriend and Phillip's wife.

===== People around Wanrasa =====
- Nla Aurthaveekul as Aye / Nhu Aye (Note: Nhoo/Nhu is used for calling someone affectionately)

One of M.C. Wanrasa's friends and her twin is Euay. She is bright, playful, brave, confident, and straightforward. She and Ueay are traveling along with Wanrasa to Switzerland.

- Ratthanarat Aurthaveekul as Ueay / Nhu Ueay

One of M.C. Wanrasa's friends and her twin is Aye. She is polite and not too assertive. She and Aye always encourage and support their friend.

- Passin Ruangvuth as M.C. Phanutatsanai / Than Chai Phanu

M.C. Wanrasa's fiancé. He is flirtatious, supercilious, snappish, and self-willed.

- Kriangkrai Unhanan as Phra Ong Chao Chatarun Arunrat / Phra Ong Chat

The father of M.C. Wanrasa and the landlord of Arunrat Palace. He is a low-ranking royal who is arrogant and smart, and also raises his only child with warm love.

- Thipaayawadee Malisorn as M.C. Wirisa Arunrat

M.C. Wanrasa's mother and died when she was young.

===== Dhevaprom family =====
- Sumonthip Hsu as M.L. Kratin Dhevaprom

The only child of M.R. Worapan, the youngest brother of M.R. Taewapan, she was raised in Southern Thailand because her father runs a rubber plantation in Southern Thailand. She is a native girl and doesn't want to marry M.R. Pawornruj. She is forced to move to Bangkok and is ordered to prepare herself for being a bride.

- Dilok Thongwattana as M.R. Taewapan Dhevaprom / Khun Chai Taewapan
- Nutwara Vongvasana as M.L. Kedsara / Khun Ked
- Chotika Wongwilas as M.L. Marathee Dhevaprom / Khun Marathee
- Esther Supreeleela as M.L. Wilairampa Dhevaprom / Khun Rampa

==== Others ====
- Krittapas Sakditsathanont as Aun / Khun Aun

Im's older brother. He is kind and polite, a nephew of the wife of the Thai Ambassador in Switzerland.

- Khemika Sukprasongdee as Im / Khun Im

Aun's younger sister. She is punctilious and sarcastic as being a niece of the wife of the Thai Ambassador in Switzerland.

- Lukkana Amitsoon as Saisamorn

M.C. Phanutatsanai's partner.

- Wiyada Umarin as Jam

M.C. Wanrasa's wet nurse.

- Watcharakiet Boonpakdee as Warat

A clerk at the Thai Embassy in Switzerland who knows the true identity of M.C. Wanrasa.

- Ram Rachaphong as Ambassador Phonlathep

Thai Ambassador to Switzerland. The uncle of Aun and Im.

- Wanthana Boonbanterng as Khun Ying Aree

The wife of Ambassador Phonlathep and an aunt of Aun and Im.

- Janya Thanasawangkul as Khae

The officer at the Ministry of Foreign Affairs.

- Witsarut Hiranbutr as Klao

M.L. Kratin's boyfriend.

- Thanuphong Sakthanawat as Thanom

Juthathep Palace's chauffeur.

- Somchart Songklod as Somwang

Taewaprom Palace's chauffeur.

- Usanee Peungpa as Waew

Taewaprom Palace's servant.

- Natthanee Sitthisaman as Somsri

Mom Aiet's servant.

- Thiparin Yodthanasawas as Jaew

Juthathep Palace's servant.

==== Cameo appearances ====
- Ken Streutker as Phillip

Waddao's husband.

- Waritsara Bumrongwetch as Bua

The survant of M.C. Wanrasa.

- Kraisee Kaewwimol as Chettha

The director of the Ministry of Foreign Affairs.

- Chomchai Chatwilai as Khun Nai Thongsuk

Grandma Oon's friend, who loves to gamble with her.

- Pataraphat To-in as Wet

Arunrat Palace's chauffeur.

- Ampha Phusit as Som

Waddao's aunt.

- Anuwan Preeyanont as Khun Nai Sodsai
- Anthika Preeyanont as Khun Nai Ming

=== Original soundtracks ===
No.	Title	Lyrics	Music	Artist	Length
1.	"รักแท้อยู่เหนือกาลเวลา" (Real love over the time)	Narongvit Techatanavat	Jakkrit Makkanasoh	Jaruwat Cheawaram	3:18
2.	"ฉันรักเธอที่เป็นแบบนี้" (I love you as you are)	Narongvit Techatanavat; Jakkrit Makkanasoh	Jakkrit Makkanasoh	Sheranut Yusananda	3:43
3.	"ยอม" (Surrender)	Narongvit Techatanavat	Jakkrit Makkanasoh	Narongvit Techatanavat	3:57
Total length:					10:58

== Khun Chai Puttipat ==
Khun Chai Puttipat (Thai: คุณชายพุฒิภัทร, romanized: Khun Chai Puttipat, lit. 'Mom Rajawongse Puttipat' is a Thai lakorn, the third drama in the series. Its novel is written by Gaotam, the drama is produced by No Problem Co., Ltd., which belongs to Thitima Sangkapitak, and directed by Yutthana Leopanpaiboon. It was first aired on every Friday–Sunday, 20.15 to 22.45 (TST) from May 3 until May 24, 2013.

=== Synopsis ===
M.R. Puttipat Juthathep, the top Neurosurgeon in the country. He has no interest in love, although M.L. Marathee Dhevaprom always tries to get his attention. One day, he had to go to Miss Siam contest and had met the woman who surprised him.

Krongkaew participated in the contest for winning the prize, but she never knew that the winner would become Sir Pinij's harem. She tried to escape and got help from M.R. Puttipat. But, because of the responsibility of the promise and the difference in living, can both make the love happen?

=== Cast ===
==== Main ====
- Jirayu Tangsrisuk as M.R. Puttipat Juthathep, M.D. / Khun Chai Pat / Khun Chai Mohr (Thai: หมอ, romanized: Mohr, lit. 'Doctor')

The Neurosurgeon at the public hospital, the first son of M.C. Witchakorn with Mom Yok. He is calm, clever, quiet, scrupulous, and has no interest in love. He is so popular with the patients and nurses at his workplace because of his good looks and smart body.

- Ranee Campen as Krongkaew Boonmee / Kaew

A young woman who was born into a poor family and lives alone with her father. She works hard to fund her father's surgery for the removal of a brain tumor and was persuaded to enter the Miss Siam contest to win the prize. Unbeknownst to her, the winner is intended to join Sir Pinij's harem.

- Chotika Wongwilas as M.L. Marathee Dhevaprom

She is a snob, a self-centered and stubborn person. She desperately wanted to be Juthathep's in-law as she had been told since young. So she does everything to get the attention of M.R. Puttipat, which includes working as a nurse at the same hospital as him.

- Montri Jane-aksorn as Sir Pinij

He is an influential and flirtatious person. He loves to lead the girls, who come from Miss Siam contest, to be his harem, but he already has Khun Ying Dara as the principal wife. He tries everything to get Krongkaew as his pander.

==== Supporting ====
===== Juthathep family =====
- Warintorn Panhakarn as M.R. Taratorn Juthathep / Khun Chai Yai
- Ranida Techasit as M.L. Raweeramphai Sawasward / Maprang
- Thanavat Vatthanaputi as M.R. Rawornruj / Khun Chai Ruj
- Nittha Jirayungyurn as Wanrasa Juthathep Na Ayudhya / Rasa
- Tanin Manoonsilp as M.R. Rachanon Juthathep / Khun Chai Lek
- James Ma as Flg.Off., M.R. Ronapee Juthathep / Khun Chai Pee
- Jaruwan Panyopas as Mom Aiet Juthathep Na Ayudhya
- Duangta Tungkamani as Grandma Oon

===== Dhevaprom family =====
- Dilok Thongwattana as M.R. Taewapan Dhevaprom / Khun Chai Taewapan
- Nutwara Vongvasana as M.L. Kedsara / Khun Ked

She is married to Chinnakorn, and now lives in the bridal house. She also helps Krongkaew from the pursuit of Sir Pinij.

- Esther Supreeleela as M.L. Wilairampa Dhevaprom / Khun Rampa

===== People around Krongkaew =====
- Krailas Kriangkrai as Kitti

The father of Krongkaew, who has the brain tumor that should undergo surgery.

- Suriyont Arunwattanakoon as Chinnakorn

Kedsara's husband and he help Krongkaew escapes from the pursuit of Sir Pinij, along with his wife, at M.R. Puttipat's request.

- Narisa Promsupa as Yam

M.L. Kedsara's servant and helper.

===== People at the hospital =====
- Jirayu Tantrakul as M.D. Yodsavin

The Gastroenterologists who is hilarious, has a sense of humor, and is a gentleman. He has a crush on Krongkaew but never exposes his true feelings.

- Naruemol Phongsupharp as Nurse Piengporn

===== People around Pinij =====
- Sueangsuda Lawanprasert as Khun Ying Dara

Sir Pinij's principal wife. She is calm and courteous, but is deeply hurt when her husband brings back the mistresses to their home.

- Nahatai Pichitra as Aing-orn

The person in charge of finding the contestants for the beauty pageant but actually, she is a madam who leads the contestants for being Sir Pinij's pander. And she is Baibua's rival.

- Deejai Deedeedee as Baibua

She is a madam who finds women to be Sir Pinij's pander, and she is Aing-orn's rival.

- Nattira Jivaramonaikool as Sunan

The daughter of Aing-orn. She is snobbery and overbearing but later becomes Sir Pinij's pander.

- Patthanapol Kunchon Na Ayutthaya as Krairerk

The son of Aing-orn and the older brother of Sunan. He is a flirtatious person and used to bully Krongkaew when she lived in Aing-orn's house.

- Pawanrat Naksuriya as Mali

The staff at Miss Siam contest and a servant at Aing-orn house.

==== Others ====
- Aekkarin Areerat as Somboon

Juthathep palace's servant and chauffeur.

- Natthanee Sitthisaman as Somsri

Mom Aiet's servant.

- Thiparin Yodthanasawas as Jaew

Juthathep palace's servant.

==== Cameo appearances ====
- Thanakorn Posayanont as M.R., Maj.Gen. Anupan Dhevaprom / Khun Chai Anupan

The younger brother of M.R. Taewapan, the husband of M.R. Daraneenuch, and the father of M.L. Sineenuch Dhevaprom. And he is the stepfather of M.L., Flg.Off. Chatchavee Dhevaprom.

- Mayurin Pongpudpan as M.R. Daraneenuch Dhevaprom / Khun Ying Daraneenuch

The wife of M.R. Anupan and the mother of M.L. Sineenuch Dhevaprom.

- Jaron Sorat as M.L., Flg.Off. Chatchavee Dhevaprom

M.R. Ronapee's friend and the stepson of M.R. Anupan.

- Settha Sirachaya as The Magnate Song

The Chinese magnate who is the father of Mom Yok and the grandfather of M.R. Puttipat and M.R. Rachanon. He is the owner of Yokfah Department Store.

- Prissana Klampinij as Teacher Bussaba

The teacher of Krongkaew who suggesting her to enter a beauty pageant Miss Siam.

- Patsachol Supree as Silvy

M.R. Puttipat's friend in the college years.

- Wut Kongkaket as Choom

Caretaker of the Juthathep family's vacation home.

- Napaporn Hongsakul as Nuan

Caretaker of the Juthathep family's vacation home.

- Sutheesak Pakdeetaewa as Sir Krirk
- Wasant Uttamayotin as Cha-moi

An MC at Sir Kirk's birthday party.

=== Original soundtracks ===
No.	Title	Lyrics	Music	Artist	Length
1.	"รักแท้อยู่เหนือกาลเวลา" (Real love over the time)	Narongvit Techatanavat	Jakkrit Makkanasoh	Tee Jetset'er; Sirintip Hanpradit	4:16
2.	"เธอจะรักฉันหรือเปล่าไม่รู้" (Will you love me or not, I don't know)	Narongvit Techatanavat	Weerapat Eung-amporn	Ronnadet Wongsaroj	5:00
3.	"โปรดถามสักคำ" (Please ask me)	Narongvit Techatanavat	Banana Boat	Kanitkul Nadebutr	4:09
Total length:					13:25

== Khun Chai Rachanon ==
=== Synopsis ===
"When the king who wears the crown of the gods arrived, the call will cause the mist that resists danger to fade away.
When the time comes, Walahok will lose the apple of the eye, but in the end, will get back what was lost."

— The old lady

The fourth Juthathep, who receives the pressure of responsibility, M.R. Rachanon Juthathep, the love-freedom person. He desperately wants to escape from the arranged marriage with M.L. Sineenuch Dhevaprom, and finally flees far away to the Northeast province. He accidentally meets a local girl, Soifah, who saves his life and leads him to the mysterious village.

He has to help her out for completing the mission in Bangkok. Everything seems to be the problem as making Soifah receive an acceptance from the grandmothers, finding someone who will be a hero for her home country, and helping her to hold back the throne from the tyrants.

=== Cast ===
==== Main characters ====
- Tanin Manoonsilp as M.R. Rachanon Juthathep / Khun Chai Lek

The fourth brother, who is civil engineer and the younger brother with the same parents as M.R. Puttipat. He is a good-natured person and truly loves freedom. So, when he was forced into the arranged marriage, he escaped to work in Isan. Then accidentally got lost in the jungle and was believed that he is The king who wears the crown of the gods. He and his brothers help Soifah seize the throne of her country from rebellion.

- Natapohn Tameeruks as Soifah / Princess Soifah Bhukhamwong / Chao Soifah (Thai: เจ้า, romanized: Chao, lit. 'Prince or Princess')

A young girl who is naughty, brave, and skilled in the jungle because she was raised there. She is the daughter of Phoryai, the head of Walahok village. She is good at martial arts and other life skills, including foreign languages which taught by Harry. She was born in Viangbhukham, the neighbor country of Thailand, where currently was occupied by rebels and she determined to seizing the throne back.

- Phongsakorn Mettharikanont as Joi / Bak Joi / Sub.Lt. Chumpol Wongsawan

The close friend of Soifah since childhood. He is hilarious and isn't an overthinker. He was assigned by his father to find the prince of Viangbhukham, who had been lost in Thailand many years ago, with Soifah and Chanta, to seize the throne back from rebels.

- Jaron Sorat as Flg.Off., M.L. Chatchavee Dhevaprom / Prince Rangsiman Bhukhamwong / Khun Chat

He is the stepson of M.R. Anupan Dhevaprom and was told that he is the son of M.R. Anupan's best friend. He is obedient and patient, even if his stepmother is bullying him because thinking that he is the son of a mistress.

- Pimthong Vachirakom as M.L. Sineenuch Dhevaprom / Nong Nuch (Thai: น้อง, romanized: Nong, lit. 'Younger sibling')

A self-centered and stubborn daughter of M.R. Anupan and M.R. Daraneenuch. She wants to be Juthathep's in-law following her mother's support despite her father's dissent.

==== Supporting characters ====
- Warintorn Panhakarn as M.R. Taratorn Juthathep / Khun Chai Yai
- Jirayu Tangsrisuk as M.R. Puttipat Juthathep, M.D. / Khun Chai Pat / Khun Chai Mohr
- Ranee Campen as Krongkaew Juthathep Na Ayudhya / Kaew
- James Ma as Flg.Off., M.R. Ronapee Juthathep / Khun Chai Pee
- Jaruwan Panyopas as Mom Aiet Juthathep Na Ayudhya / Grandma Aiet
- Duangta Tungkamani as Grandma Oon
- Pattrakorn Tangsupakul as Chanta / Taraked Wongsawan

Chanta is the stepdaughter of Pran Joey, who lives in Thailand. After her father's death, she moved to live at Walahok village by accident. She is meek, obedient, grateful and good at housework, so when she living in Juthathep Palace, she did everything to repay.

- Thanakorn Posayanont as M.R., Maj.Gen. Anupan Taewaprom / Khun Chai Anupan

The younger brother of M.R. Taewapan, the husband of M.R. Daraneenuch, and the father of M.L. Sineenuch Dhevaprom, and he is the stepfather of M.L. Chatchavee Dhevaprom.

- Mayurin Pongpudpan as M.R. Daraneenuch Dhevaprom / Khun Ying Daraneenuch

The wife of M.R. Anupan and the mother of M.L. Sineenuch Dhevaprom. She hates M.L. Chatchavee because of the idea of him being the son of the mistress.

- Pongpat Wachirabunjong as Phor Yai (Thai: พ่อ, romanized: Phor, lit. 'Father') / King Suriyawong Bhukhamwong

The head of Walahok village. After the rebellion occurred in Viangbhukham, he fled to Thailand and separated with his wife and son. So when he is in Thailand, he tries to find them and plans to seize the throne back, with the help of Walahok villagers.

- Oliver Bever as Harry

The assistant of Phor Yai, who acted as a teacher in Walahok village. He taught every subject, especially in foreign languages.

- Sakkarach Ruekthamrong as Kraisorn / Field marshal Kraisorn Wongsawan

The assistant of Phor Yai as Harry, he was also lost his wife and daughter at the rellion incident. He is also the father of Joi.

- Santisuk Promsiri as General officer Segeong

The head of the rebels who seized power from King Suriyawong and used Chao Weerawong as the puppet for the throne.

- Setha Sirachaya as The Magnate Song

The Chinese magnate who is the father of Mom Yok and the grandfather of M.R. Puttipat and M.R. Rachanon. He is the owner of Yokfah Department Store, the biggest store in Bangkok.

- Tatsawan Saeneewong Na Ayutthaya as The old lady

She is the old lady in Walahok village who knows an ancient treatment and has a sense of superstition. She is the one who tells the people about the mist, which resists the danger and the future of the village.

- Sarut Vijitranont as Chao Weerawong

He became the representative of Segeong by force, and he is unwilling to do that.

- Pollarat Rodraksa as Ponhong

The Viangbhukham citizen who gathers many people to help the prince seize the throne, who later become the hero of Viangbhukham.

==== Cameo appearances ====
- Benjawan Ardner as Queen Songdao Bhukhamwong / Chao Nang Songdao (Thai: เจ้านาง, romanized: Chap Nang, lit. 'Queen')

The queen of Viangbhukham. She and her son were separated from her husband and daughter. She received the help from an old friend, M.R. Anupan. But later, she died and left her son with him.

- Thong Chuanchuen as Boonhome

The local assistant of M.R. Rachanon, in the field when he works as an engineer, before lost in the wild.

- Udom Songsang as Pran Kern (Thai: พราน, romanized: Pran, lit. 'Hunter')

The local hunter that Juthathep brothers hired when they found M.R. Rachanon in the wild

- Krekkiet Panpipat as Pran Joey (Thai: พราน, romanized: Pran, lit. 'Hunter')

The local people in the area where M.R. Rachanon was working. He adopted Chanta since her young.

- Aekkarin Areerat as Sombun

Juthathep palace's servant and chauffeur

- Natthanee Sitthisaman as Somsri

Mom Aiet's servant

=== Original soundtracks ===
No.	Title	Lyrics	Music	Artist	Length
1.	"รักแท้อยู่เหนือกาลเวลา" (Real love over the time)	Narongvit Techatanavat	Jakkrit Makkanasoh	Napat Injaiuea	3:49
2.	"เอื้อมไม่ถึง" (Out of reach)	Narongvit Techatanavat	Jakkrit Makkanasoh	Mhoo MUZU	3:55
3.	"เผลอใจ" (Be lost in love)	Narongvit Techatanavat	BANANA BOAT	Lula; Pichika Jittaputta	4:36
Total length:					11:40

== Khun Chai Ronapee ==
Khun Chai Ronapee (Thai: คุณชายรณพีร์; RTGS: Khun Chai Ronnaphi) is a 2013 Thai lakorn final part of the series, directed by Chatchai Plengpanich. It aired on ThaiTV3 on Friday until Sunday at 20:15 beginning June 15, 2013, for 11 episodes. It stars James Ma and Chalida Vijitvongthong.

=== Synopsis ===
The last one who has to be responsible for the marriage promise, Flg.Off., M.R. Ronapee Juthathep. He is independent and doesn't want to marry with M.L. Wilairampa Dhevaprom. But on the other hand, she wants to be the Juthathep's in-law so she does everything to achieve her dream. One day, M.R. Ronapee accidentally meets Piangkwan, an actress who has an accident on the drama shooting set, and she falls into his arms. Ronapee interested in Piangkwan, he follows her everywhere and greets himself as a common air force pilot to test her.

While his grandmothers always pressure him because he is the last one who can keep a promise. The brothers can feel what he is facing and try to find ways to help him marry his true lover, despite an argument with their grandmother.

Everything seems impossible, but no matter what, they both will fight together for their love along with their brothers' help.

==== Main characters ====
- James Ma as Flg.Off., M.R. Ronapee Juthathep / Khun Chai Pee

Khun Chai Ronapee is a Royal Thai Air Force fighter pilot, is on duty at Wing 6, F-86F aircraft. He is a playful person but decisive while working. He would love to flirt with women, but does not truly understand love. When he is with his grandmothers, he tends to behave like a crybaby.

- Chalida Vijitvongthong as Piangkwan Chanpradab / Kwan

"A rising star actress who is beautiful and sweet. She has a strong personality and closes the heart because of her family's previous tragedy of love. She is the sole breadwinner of the family."

- Esther Supreeleela as M.L. Wilairampa Dhevaprom / Khun Rampa

She is the youngest child of M.R. Taewapan, so she has the youngest's habits. She is close with M.L. Marathee, and that makes them both have similar personalities. She is a college student and was raised to believe that she would be Juthathep's in-law. That makes her try to make M.R. Ronapee love without the consideration of any methods.

- Thagoon Karnthip as Aut Chermsiri

The half-older brother of Piangkwan who is warm and kindhearted. He is independent and fun to tease Chankrapoh, as falling in love with her.

- Savitree Suttichanond as Chankrapoh / Chan

Piangkwan's best friend. She is the only child of Muay Thai gym owner, making her become brave and tough woman. She follows Piangkwan to the drama shooting field to help her like a manager.

==== Supporting characters ====
===== Juthathep family =====
- Warintorn Panhakarn as M.R. Taratorn Juthathep / Khun Chai Yai
- Thanavat Vatthanaputi as M.R. Pawornruj Juthathep / Khun Chai Ruj
- Jirayu Tangsrisuk as M.R. Puttipat Juthathep, M.D. / Khun Chai Pat
- Tanin Manoonsilp as M.R. Rachanon Juthathep / Khun Chai Lek
- Ranida Techasit as M.L. Raweeramphai Juthathep / Maprang
- Nittha Jirayungyurn as Wanrasa Juthathep Na Ayudhya / Rasa
- Ranee Campen as Krongkaew Juthathep Na Ayudhya / Kaew
- Natapohn Tameeruks as Soifah Juthathep Na Ayudhya / Soifah
- Jaruwan Panyopas as Mom Aiet Juthathep Na Ayudhya
- Duangta Tungkamani as Grandma Oon

===== Dhevaprom family =====
- Dilok Thongwattana as M.R. Taewapan Dhevaprom / Khun Chai Taewapan
- Chotika Wongwilas as M.L. Marathee Dhevaprom / Khun Marathee

===== People around Piangkwan =====
- Anuwat Niwaswong as Adul Chermsiri
  - Kanin Stanley as Young Adul

Aut and Piangkwan's father and the ex-husband of Napha. He is the owner of a wood camp in Northern Thailand.

- Khwanruedi Klom Klom as Napha Chanpradab

Piangkwan's mother

- Arisara Wongchalee as Bulan Chanpradab

The younger sister of Napha, the aunt of Piangkwan and the mother of Pranote.

- Pimkae Goonchorn Na Ayutthaya as Phan Chanpradab

Piangkwan's grandmother

- Tik Shiro as Chana

Piangkwan's uncle and the director of the film.

- Sasidej Sasiprapha as Pranote

Piangkwan's nephew and the son of Bulan.

===== People in Royal Thai Air Force =====
- Methus Treerattanawareesin as Flg.Off. Yodyod Thongyot

M.R. Ronapee's friend at the Wing 6. He used to has a crush on Piangkwan even if he had a fiancée, later Ronapee admonished him and he went back to his fiancée.

- Jakarin Puribhat as Plt.Off. Khanti

The junior of M.R. Ronapee and being in the same Wing.

- Patee Sarasin as Sergeant Lamai

The aircraft engineer at the Wing 6

===== Others =====
- Nitchapan Chunhawongwasu as Pimpan / Pim

Yodyod's fiancée and a friend of M.L. Wilairampa Dhevaprom.

- Thanongsak Supphakan as Date Kamhaeng

He has a crush on Napha so far, and wants to bring Napha and Piangkwan to live with him.

- Santi Santiwechakul as Sia Peng

A married man and a producer of the film which Piangkwan is starring. He is flirtatious and wants Piangkwan to be his harem.

- Kanokkorn Jaicheun as Bongkot
- Nuttanee Sittisamarn as Somsri
- Thipharin Yodthanasawas as Jaew
- Praeva Bunnag as Salakjit

Panote's friend

- Palida Khumwongdee as Chailai

The friend of Pimpan and M.L Wilairampa.

- --- as Adul's sister

==== Cameo appearances ====
- Songsit Roongnophakunsri as M.C. Witchakorn Juthathep
- Chintara Sukapatana as M.R. Ubolwan Juthathep
- Piyawadee Maleenont as Mom Yok Juthathep Na Ayudhya
- Jariya Anfone as Mom Cheongnang Juthathep Na Ayudhya
- Prin Suparat as a senior Air Force pilot
- Peradon Plengpanich as an Air Force pilot
- Kan Phongnua as an Air Force pilot
- Peter Varit as an Air Force pilot
- Chomchay Chatwilai as Madam Thongsuk

Grandma Oon's friend who loves to gamble with her.

- Thipparat Amattayakul as singer (ep 1)
- Jaron Sorat as King Rangsiman (ep 10)

The king of Viangbhukham and M.R. Ronapee's former air force college friend.

- Chalitrat Chantharubeksa as Gp.Capt., the Commander of Wing 6
- Tichakorn Plengpanich as Nurse
- Duangtawan Sirikon as Teacher
- Sarut Wijittranon as Prince Weerawong
- Aphichan Chaleumchainuwong as Sakda

M.R. Ronapee's friend and the new producer of Chana's film

- Surasak Chaiyaat as Captain
- Prakasit Bowsuwan as Pumpui / Punya

The father of Chankrapoh and the Muay Thai gym owner.

- Sikrintarn Plaithuan as Mei Hua

Sia Peng's wife

- Jaturong Kolimart as Pranote's Father

=== Original soundtrack ===
No.	Title	Artist	Length
1.	"รักแท้อยู่เหนือกาลเวลา" (True Love Knows No Time)	Crescendo	4:07
2.	"อย่าบอกฉันว่าให้ไป" (Don't Tell Me To Go)	Chinawut Indracusin	3:54
3.	"อาทิตย์อับแสง" (Blue Day)	Jaruwat Cheawaram	3:40
4.	"อาทิตย์อับแสง" (Blue Day)	Sand Tepin	3:38
5.	"Make It Right"	Patee Sarasin	4:13
6.	"รักแท้อยู่เหนือกาลเวลา (Acoustic Ver.)" (True Love Knows No Time (Acoustic Ver.))	Crescendo	4:06

=== Ratings ===
In the tables below, the blue numbersrepresents the lowest ratings and the red numbersrepresents the highest ratings.

Episode #	Original broadcast date	Ratings
1	15 June 2013	12.6%
2	16 June 2013	10.2%
3	21 June 2013	9.1%
4	22 June 2013	8.9%
5	23 June 2013	8.7%
6	28 June 2013	8.7%
7	29 June 2013	9.1%
8	30 June 2013	9.0%
9	5 July 2013	9.8%
10	6 July 2013	11.2%
11	7 July 2013	12.7%
Average		10.00%

== Anecdotes ==
- Chao is the rank that refers to the people who is the descendant of the royal family, the meaning is vary to the country it is used.
- In Thailand, the royal language doesn't use only with Mom Rajawongse (M.R.) and Mom Luang (M.L.) ranks, which are the lowest ranks.
- The rank Mom Rajawongse (M.R.) is casually called Khun Chai for male and Khun Ying for female. However, Khun Ying also can receive noble titles from the king or uses with a common individual who married with a high ranks military.
- The rank Mom Luang (M.L.) is the bottom Thai royal rank, casually called Khun
- Mom is the rank which have many ways to receive; however, in this article refers mostly to a commoner who married a prince.

== Awards and nominations ==
Year	Award	Category	Nominated work	Result
2013	11th Seventeen Choice Awards	Male Rising Star	James Ma	Won
2013	OK! Awards	Male Rising Star	James Ma	Nominated
2013	TV3 Fanclub Awards	Popular Male Rising Star	James Ma	Won
2013	TV3 Fanclub Awards	Popular Female Actress	Chalida Vijitvongthong	Nominated
2013	TV3 Fanclub Awards	Popular Drama	Khun Chai Ronapee	Nominated
2014	4th Mthai Top Talk Awards	Top Talk-About TV Drama	Khun Chai Ronapee	Nominated
2014	3rd Daradaily The Great Awards	Male Rising Star of the Year	James Ma	Nominated
2014	11th Kom Chad Luek Awards	Popular Actor Award	James Ma	Nominated
2014	8th Kazz Awards	Popular Actor Award	James Ma	Nominated
2014	5th Nataraja Award	Best Drama Award	Suphapburut Juthathep	Nominated
2014	5th Nataraja Award	Best Lead Actress Award	Natapohn Tameeruks	Nominated
2014	5th Nataraja Award	Best Cast Award	Suphapburut Juthathep	Nominated
2014	5th Nataraja Award	Best Screenplay Award	Pimthama from Khun Chai Rachanon	Nominated
2014	5th Nataraja Award	Best OST Award	"Real love over the time"	Won
2014	5th Nataraja Award	Best Costume Award	Hiruntorn Sangsri; Wiriya Phongkhajorn; Nopphol Taecho; Phuriwat Kitisrisawai; Thitikorn Sricheun	Won
2014	5th Nataraja Award	Best Photographic Directing Award	Adul Prayanto; Rhang Weerachart; Samai Jongjitmeth; Achira Damplub; Chatchai Plengpanich	Nominated
2014	5th Nataraja Award	Best Art Directing Award	Akkara Chandra; Thavatchai Padsri; Narong Boonbamrung	Won
2014	28th Golden Television Awards	Best Lead Actor Award	Thanavat Vatthanaputi	Won
2014	28th Golden Television Awards	Best Lead Actor Award	Jirayu Tangsrisuk	Nominated
2014	28th Golden Television Awards	Best Lead Actress Award	Natapohn Tameeruks	Won
2014	28th Golden Television Awards	Best Supporting Actor Award	Pongsakorn Mettarikanont	Nominated
2014	28th Golden Television Awards	Best Supporting Actress Award	Chotika Wongwilas	Nominated
2014	7th Nine Entertain Awards 2014	Best Drama of the Year	Khun Chai Rachanon	Won
