= Rompaeng =

Thai novelist

- จันทร์ยวีร์ สมปรีดา
- Born: Chanyawee Sompreeda; 8 June 1977 (age 49); Sichon, Nakhon Si Thammarat, Thailand
- Other name: Rompaeng (รอมแพง) (pen name)
- Occupation: Novelist
- Notable work: Bupphesanniwat; Phrom likhit

Rompaeng (Thai: รอมแพง; RTGS: Romphaeng) is the pen name of Chanyawee Sompreeda (จันทร์ยวีร์ สมปรีดา), a Thai novelist. She is best known for Bupphesanniwat (บุพเพสันนิวาส), a romance–comedy–time travel novel which was adapted into a TV drama on Channel 3 titled Love Destiny in 2018. It is considered the most popular TV drama in more than 20 years, and created a national phenomenon.

== Personal life ==
Rompaeng was born on 8 June 1977 in Sichon District, Nakhon Si Thammarat Province in southern Thailand. She graduated from Kanlayanee Si Thammarat School and received a bachelor's degree in Archeology (major in art history) from Silpakorn University.

== Career ==
Before she became a writer, she had more than eleven different careers. She first began writing novels for Pantip.com in 2006. She spent three years gathering information for her 2010 work of art, Bupphesanniwat, but only one month finishing the original manuscript.

She has written more than twenty works. Many of her novels have been adapted into TV dramas on Channel 3 and Channel 7 HD, in addition to Bupphesanniwat, such as Dao Kiao Duean (ดาวเกี้ยวเดือน) and its sequel Dao Khiang Duean (ดาวเคียงเดือน), Khitaloka (คีตโลกา), Ruean Phayom (เรือนพะยอม), and Phrai Phayakon (พรายพยากรณ์).
