= Sarawittaya School =

- โรงเรียนสารวิทยา

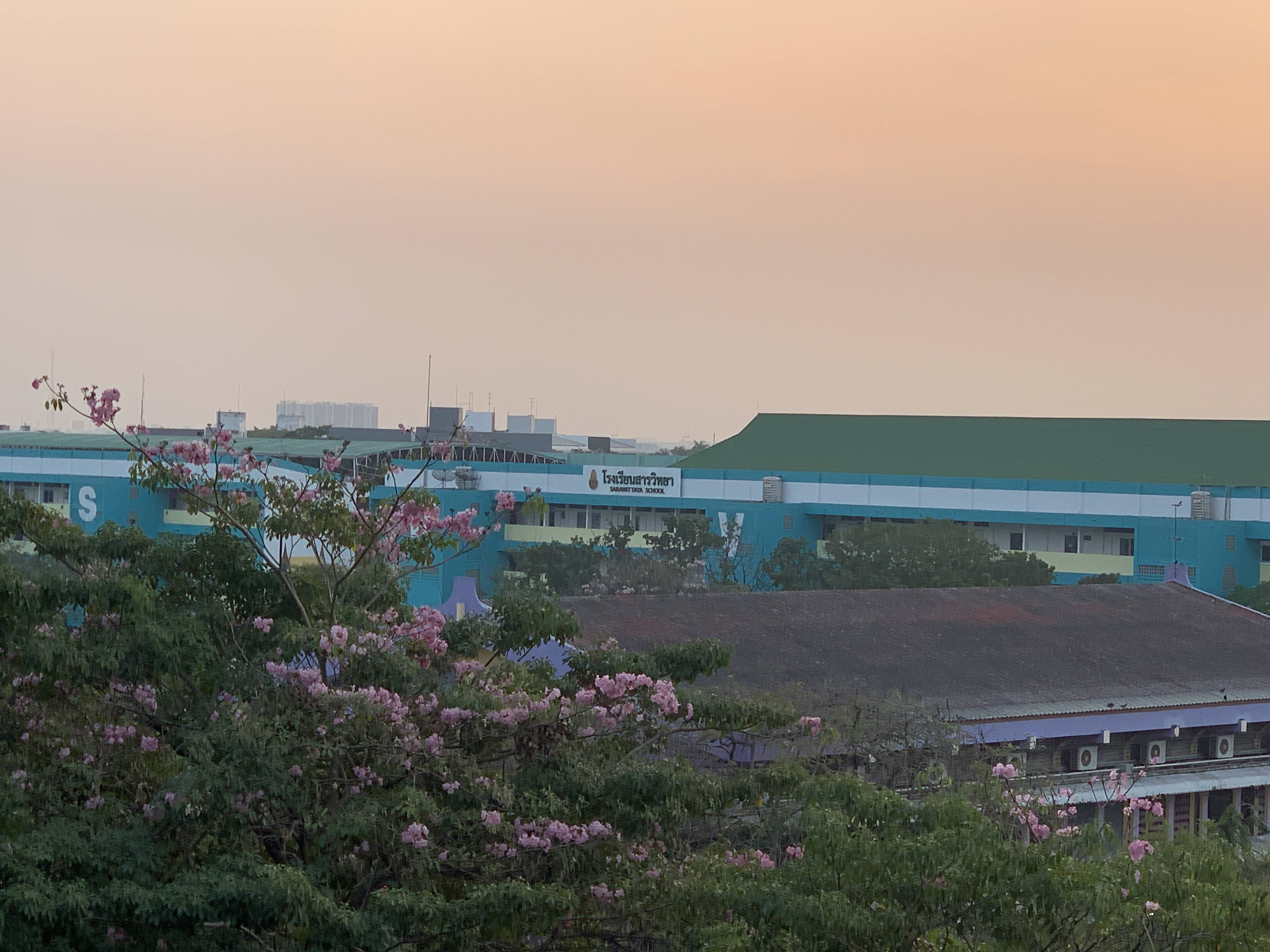
- Sarawittaya School from BTS Skytrain Royal Forest Department Station

Location
- 2398/96 Phaholyothin Road, Sena Nikhom; Bangkok; Chatuchak District; Thailand

Information
- Other name: S.R.V. (ส.ย)
- Former name: Sarawittaya Army Sponsor School (โรงเรียนกองทัพบกอุปถัมภ์ สารวิทยา)
- Type: Public secondary school
- Motto: S̄uwichcho w chnes̄uto (สุวิชโช ว ชเนสุโต) (A person with good knowledge is an outstanding person among the people.)
- Established: 1 July 1944 (81 years, 236 days)
- Founder: Col.Chukkrayutwichai Hongsakul (พ.อ.จักรายุทธวิชัย หงสกุล)
- Authority: Office of the Basic Education Commission
- School Director: Norodom Narinrum
- Grades: 7–12 (Mathayom 1–6)
- Enrollment: 2,894
- Language: Thai, English, Chinese, Japanese and French
- Area: 49,600 m2
- Colors: Green; White
- Song: March Sarawittaya (มาร์ชสารวิทยา)
- Website: www.srv.ac.th

โรงเรียนสารวิทยา (Bangkok)

Sarawittaya School (Thai : โรงเรียนสารวิทยา), formerly Sarawittaya Army Sponsor School, is a secondary school in Bangkok, founded in 1944 as a Royal Thai Chemical Department internal school by Col. Praya Witthaya Sarunayut for children of the government officials, and as public school by Col. Chukkrayutwichai Hongsakul. The school offers education from levels M 1- M 6 (Grades 7-12).

== History ==
In 1941, due to the closure of schools in Thonburi and Phra Nakhon provinces during World War II, children of government officials and those employed by the Royal Thai Chemical Department were left without a place to receive education. It was decided by government officials that the Royal Thai Chemical Department should open a school to educate the children, and a request to do so was made to the Ministry of Education.

The Royal Thai Chemical Department's Head, Col. Praya Witthaya Sarunayut, established the school on May 20, 1944, named Sarawittaya Army Sponsor School. Lt. Col. Khun Banyatthip Komut was assigned as the school's manager and owner, and Mrs. Samruay Unahalekaka was appointed as a teacher under the department's support, and classes began on June 2, 1944.

Sarawittaya Army Sponsor School was named after Col. Praya Witthaya Sarunayut in commemoration. On 1 May 1976, the Sarawittaya Army Sponsor School was transferred to the Department of General Education and changed its name to Sarawittaya School.

== School Overview ==
- School Address : 2398/96 Phahonyothin Road, Chatuchak, Bangkok 10900
- School Area : 12.2 acre
- School Abbreviation : S.R.V. (ส.ย)
- Type of School: Government Secondary School
- School Motto : "สุวิชโช ว ชเนสุโต" ผู้มีวิชาดี เป็นคนเด่นในหมู่ชน" A person with good knowledge is an outstanding person among the people.
- School Colors : Green-White
- School Song : March Sarawittaya

== School Emblem ==
The Great Crown of Victory that has an 18-point radius and features the S.R.V. (ส.ย.) seal in Thai beneath the Great Crown of Victory, under the seal has a green ribbon with the name of the school written on it.

== List of School Director ==
Sarawittaya School School Director list
School Director	Timespan
1. Mr. Samran Deemonkon	1976–1986
2. Mr. Narong Kanjananon	1986–1991
3. Mrs. Wapanee Karunyawinit	1991–1992
4. Mr. Assawin Wannawinweth	1992–1994
5. Mrs. Pongsri Buaprachum	1994–2000
6. Mr. Prawit Pritikul	2000–2002
7. Mr. Sarayut Fushabnirun	2002–2008
8. Dr.Pacharapong Treethepha	2008–2011
9. Mr. Rachawat Sawangrat	2011–2016
10. Dr.Pacharapong Treethepha	2016–2018
11. Dr. Prawat Suthiprapha	2018–2020
12. Mr.Norodom Narinrum	2020–present

== Alumni ==
- Ranee Campen
- Korraphat Nareechan
- Pongphan Wongsuwan

== See also ==
- List of schools in Thailand
