= Tanin Manoonsilp =

Thai model and actor

- ธนิน มนูญศิลป์
- Born: April 3, 1990 (age 36); Chonburi, Thailand
- Other names: Bomb, Bomb Tanin
- Education: Business Management, Assumption University
- Occupation: Actor
- Years active: 2011–
- Agent: Channel 3 (2011–2022)
- Notable work: Khun Chai Rachanon (2013); Cubic (2014); Chuamong Tong Mon (2018)
- Height: 1.91 m (6 ft 3 in)
- Parents: Thanet Manoonsilp (father); Pataphat Manoonsilp (mother)

Tanin Manoonsilp (Thai: ธนิน มนูญศิลป์; born April 3, 1990, in Thailand), nickname Bomb (Thai: บอมบ์), is a Thai actor. He is currently freelance actors. His acting debut is Khun Chai Rachanon in the Suphapburut Juthathep series, which he played as the main cast, M.R. Rachanon Jutathep.

== Life and career ==
Tanin was born in Chonburi province with 3 brothers and 1 brother. Bum is the second child. There is 1 brother and 1 brother. Bum is the son of Dr. Thanet Manoonsilp, a specialist urinary system surgeon Head of Surgery Chonburi Hospital With Mrs. Pataphat Manoonsilp

Thanin graduated from secondary school from Assumption College Sriracha. Graduated from high school from Demonstration School "Phibun Bampen" Burapha University Before entering higher education Bum joined the summer English program. And traveling to study in England. Currently graduating with a bachelor's degree from the Faculty of Business Administration Assumption University (Thailand)

=== Career ===
Tanin stepped into the entertainment industry by shooting advertisements. Later, he was portrayed as a guest actor in the drama Likit Sanae Ha and drama Noom Ban Rai Kub Wan Ja Hai So before stepping into the role of the first hero in the drama series. Suparburoot Jutathep, when Khun Chai Rachanon

== Personal life ==
Tanin has special abilities in both music and sports. Music that is played regularly is a guitar piano, and the sport is tennis, basketball. In addition, Tanin has very good English language skills.

== Filmography ==
=== Television series ===
Year	Title	Role	Network	Notes
2011	Likit Sanae Ha	Police	Channel 3	Cameo
2012	Noom Ban Rai Kub Wan Ja Hai So	Doctor	Channel 3	Cameo
2013	Khun Chai Taratorn	M.R. Rachanon Jutathep / Khun Chai Lek	Channel 3	Main cast Suphapburut Juthathep series
2013	Khun Chai Pawornruj	M.R. Rachanon Jutathep / Khun Chai Lek	Channel 3	Main cast Suphapburut Juthathep series
2013	Khun Chai Puttipat	M.R. Rachanon Jutathep / Khun Chai Lek	Channel 3	Main cast Suphapburut Juthathep series
2013	Khun Chai Rachanon	M.R. Rachanon Jutathep / Khun Chai Lek	Channel 3	Main cast Suphapburut Juthathep series
2013	Khun Chai Ronapee	M.R. Rachanon Jutathep / Khun Chai Lek	Channel 3	Main cast Suphapburut Juthathep series
2014	Cubic	Lin Lan Ser	Channel 3	Main role
2014	Suey Rai Sai Lub	Kunthep Naradun	Channel 3	Main role
2016	Pee Roon Pram Ruk	Logan Lu	Channel 3	Main role
2017	Duen Pradab Dao	Warat (Nuknik)	Channel 3	Main role
2018	Chuamong Tong Mon	Narit Kittipaisarnsakun (Mark / Richie) (chapter, gay)	Channel 3	Main role
2018	Dung Prom Likit Ruk	M.C. Danaitheprangsan Phromkun / Than Chai Kong / Kanin	Channel 3	Main role
2020	Toong Sanaeha	Praiwan	Channel 3	Main role
2020	Watsana Rak	Praiwan	Channel 3	Cameo
2021	Barb Ayuttitham	Kharabaek	Channel 3	Lead role
2021	Pruesapa Thunwa Ruk Tae Kae Kerd Korn	Mor Ta	Channel 3	Supporting role
TBA	Khun Ying Jom Khaen	Jinotsak	Channel 3	Main role
TBA	Mummy Tee Rak	Peera	Channel 3	Main role

=== Music video ===
- "Don't want to be perceived" – ETC
- "I will take care of you" – OST. Suey Rai Sai Lub
- "Happy Birthday Channel 3"

== Discography ==
=== Song ===
- "I'll Take Care of You" – OST. Suey Rai Sai Lub
- Happy Birthday Channel 3" with Ranida Tachasit

=== Concert ===
Concert	Date	Place	Artists
LOVE IS IN THE AIR : CHANNEL3 CHARITY CONCERT	April 29, 2017	Impact, Muang Thong Thani	All Channel 3 actors

== Award ==
- Siam Dara Star Awards 2013, Best Male Star Performer
- OK Awards 2013 New Star Rising Branch
- Phra Kinnaree Award, Good People, Good Thinking, Good Society, Follow the Royal Trail
- M Thai Top Talk Awards 2014, the most talked about male actor
- Buddhist Ambassador Award World Vesak
- Sport Man 2014 Award
- The reward of mercy By the Artist Council promoting Buddhism
- Highly grateful gratitude to mothers for the year 2017
- Asthira Iyara Award 2018, Best Supporting Actor (Male) from Chuamong Tong Mon
- Siam Dara Star Award 2018, The Scene Thief Award from Chuamong Tong Mon
- Buddhist ambassador for Asanha Bucha-Phansa Day 2018
