= Thanavat Vatthanaputi =

Thai actor and model

- ธนวรรธน์ วรรธนะภูติ
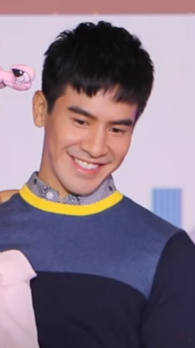
- Born: Thana Vatthanaputi Thai: ธนะ วรรธนะภูติ 27 December 1982 (age 43)
- Other name: Pope (โป๊ป)
- Occupations: Actor; model
- Years active: 2009-present
- Agent: Channel 3 (2011-present)
- Notable work: Love Destiny
- Height: 1.75 m (5 ft 9 in)

Thanavat Vatthanaputi (Thai: ธนวรรธน์ วรรธนะภูติ or nicknamed Pope (Thai: โป๊ป) is a Thai actor and model. He is best known for his roles in television dramas such as Dok Som See Thong (ดอกส้มสีทอง, 2011), Tawan Dueat (ตะวันเดือด, 2011), Khun Chai Pawornruj (คุณชายปวรรุจ, 2013), and Bupphe Sanniwat (บุพเพสันนิวาส, 2018).

== Early life ==
Vatthanaputi attended Patai Udom Suksa primary school and Horwang junior high school. Later on, he earned a vocational certificate from College of Fine Arts and a Bachelor of Fine and Applied Arts (Communication Design) Faculty Architecture degree from King Mongkut's Institute of Technology Ladkrabang. After graduating, he worked in the computer graphics department at Modernform Group Public Company Limited for 5 months.

== Career ==
Vatthanaputi entered the entertainment industry in 2006 after winning the Looking for Ye Htut Project contest, taking on the role Ye Htut in the TV series Phu Chana Sip Thit. Although the drama was originally slated to debut on Modernine TV, the project was ultimately canceled. After this setback, Vatthanaputi became a disciple of Tan Mui or Mom Chao Chatrichalerm Yukol until finally securing his first movie role as Khun Ram Decha in The Legend of King Naresuan The Great, Part III, Naval Battle. But with a long filming period Making a second movie, he played a full-length heroine in October Sonata opposite Ratchwin Wongviriya, released in 2009 and played a leading role again in the movie Rak Lamile in the role of "Dan" with a new female heroine Siri Luthor, but there is a reason for the movie not to be released. Later, Pope Thanawat came to star in the first drama with TPBS, playing the role of "Mor Kan" with Savitree Sutthichanond in the drama He Named Kan, which finished filming but not aired.

=== Entertainment Industry (2011-Present) ===
Pope Thanawat came to be an actor on Channel 3 from the role of "Ravi" in the movie October Sonata, causing Channel 3 interest and contacting him to sign a contract as an actor under Channel 3 for a period of 3 years and currently Pope Thanawat is an actor under Channel 3 HD. In 2011, Pope Thanawat was set to play the role of "Charlie" in the drama "Red House", but with the intention of becoming ordained as planned. causing to reject this drama. The first drama that Pope Thanawat has shown on Channel 3 is the drama. "Dok Som See Thong", playing the role of "Nut", which is considered the birth of Pope as a full-time actor on Channel 3 and in the same year, Pope starred in the drama "Tawan Dueat", playing the role of Singha and receiving The role of Dr. Wattana in the drama Game Rai Game Rak and was the first hero from the series Wings Chasing, which is the end of the drama in the episode, playing the role of Joker, but with the factor of the broadcast time, it is not very memorable. until the end of the year 2012

In 2012, Pope Thanawat starred in the drama "Buang", playing the role of Kla/Anukul.

In 2013, Pope Thanawat was given the opportunity to work in a drama celebrating the 43rd anniversary of Channel 3 HD titled Gentleman Jutathep: Khun Chai Pawornruj in the role of Mom Rajawongse Pawornrut Jutathep (Khun Chai Ruj). Along with Mew Nittha Jirayungyurn after this series aired, it was very successful. For this role he was awarded the Golden Television Award. in the category of Outstanding Lead Actor.

In 2014, Pope Thanawat starred in the drama Husband Titra in the role of Mom Luang Phisuth with Laila Boonyasak. This drama made him become more famous. The same year, Pope rejoined with Nittha Jirayungyurn once again in the story of Love Act, playing the role of Joe. In 2015, he starred in the comedy period drama Sapai Jao with Pijakhana Wongsaratanasilp.

== Personal life ==
Vatthanaputi's father gave him the nickname Thana (ธนะ), or "Pope", after Pope John Paul II visited Thailand in 1984. He has an older sister and a younger sibling. In his spare time, he coaches kids' football and serves as an art teacher for the To Be Number One Project.

== Filmography ==
=== Film ===
| Year | Title | Role | Notes |
|---|---|---|---|
| 2009 | October Sonata | Rawee | Main Role |
| 2011 | The Legend of King Naresuan The Great, Part III, Naval Battle | Khun Ram Decha | Support Role |
| 2011 | The Legend of King Naresuan The Great, Part IV, The Nanda Bayin War | Khun Ram Decha | Support Role |
| 2013 | Raklamile | Dan | Main Role |
| 2020 | Oh My God Father | Got Kitattipoom | Main Role |
| 2022 | Love Destiny: The Movie | Phop | Main Role |

=== Dramas ===
| Year | English title | Native title | Role | Notes | Network |
|---|---|---|---|---|---|
| 2011 | Dok Som See Thong | ดอกส้มสีทอง | Nut | Support Role | Channel 3 |
| 2011 | Wink Jao Sanae | วิ้งค์ เจ้าเสน่ห์ | Joke | Main role | Channel 3 |
| 2011 | Tawan Dueat | ตะวันเดือด | Singh | Main role | Channel 3 |
| 2011 | Game Rai Game Rak | เกมร้ายเกมรัก | Dr. Wattana Sinthudej / P'Mor | Main role | Channel 3 |
| 2012 | Buang | บ่วง | Anugoon [Present] | Support Role | Channel 3 |
| 2013 | Suphapburut Juthathep; Khun Chai Taratorn | สุภาพบุรุษจุฑาเทพ คุณชายธราธร | M.R. Pawornruj Juthathep / Khun Chai Ruj | Main cast | Channel 3 |
| 2013 | Khun Chai Pawornruj | คุณชายปวรรุจ | M.R. Pawornruj Juthathep / Khun Chai Ruj | Main Role | Channel 3 |
| 2013 | Khun Chai Puttipat | คุณชายพุฒิภัทร | M.R. Pawornruj Juthathep / Khun Chai Ruj | Main cast | Channel 3 |
| 2013 | Khun Chai Rachanon | คุณชายรัชชานนท์ | M.R. Pawornruj Juthathep / Khun Chai Ruj | Main cast | Channel 3 |
| 2013 | Khun Chai Ronapee | คุณชายรณพีร์ | M.R. Pawornruj Juthathep / Khun Chai Ruj | Main cast | Channel 3 |
| 2014 | Samee Tee Tra | สามีตีตรา | Pisut | Main role | Channel 3 |
| 2014 | Ruk Ok Rit | รักออกฤทธิ์ | Namchok / Nai Dao / Joe | Main role | Channel 3 |
| 2015 | Sapai Chao | สะใภ้จ้าว | Kittirajnarin Wuttiwong / "Chai Rong" | Main role | Channel 3 |
| 2016 | Luerd Ruk Toranong | เลือดรักทระนง | Ram Lerdpanich | Main role | Channel 3 |
| 2017 | Por Yung Lung Mai Wahng | พ่อยุ่งลุงไม่ว่าง | Teng | Main role | Channel 3 |
| 2018 | Bupphe Sanniwat | บุพเพสันนิวาส | Muen Suntorndewa / Por Date | Main role | Channel 3 |
| 2018 | Kham See Than Dorn | ข้ามสีทันดร | Tiangwan | Main role | Channel 3 |
| 2020 | Roy Leh Marnya | ร้อยเล่ห์มารยา | Ramin / "Min" | Main role | Channel 3 |
| 2023 | Love Destiny 2 | พรหมลิขิต | Ok Ya Wisutsakorn/Por Rueng/Por Rit | Main role | Channel 3 |

== Discography ==
=== Soundtracks ===
| Year | Title | Notes |
|---|---|---|
| 2014 | เธอไม่ต้อง | Ruk Ok Rit OST |
| 2018 | บุพเพสันนิวาส (Bonus Track) | Bupphe Sanniwat OST |
| 2018 | ออเจ้าเอย (Special Version) | Bupphe Sanniwat OST |

== Concerts ==
| Year | Event | Notes |
|---|---|---|
| 2017 | LOVE IS IN THE AIR: CHANNEL3 CHARITY CONCERT | |
| 2018 | Bupphe Sanniwat FAN MEETING | With Bupphe Sanniwat Cast |
