= Love Destiny 2 (TV series) =

Thai drama series

- Genre: Romance; Comedy; Drama; Historical; Time travel Marketing
- Written by: Salaya Sukanivatt
- Directed by: Saraswati Wongsomphet
- Starring: Thanavat Vatthanaputi; Ranee Campen
- Country of origin: Thailand
- Original language: Thai
- No. of episodes: 26

Production
- Producer: Arunosha Panuphan
- Running time: 120 minutes
- Production company: Broadcast Thai Television

Original release
- Network: Channel 3 HD
- Release: 18 October – 18 December 2023

Related
- Love Destiny

Love Destiny 2 (Thai: พรหมลิขิต, lit. 'Destiny') is a Thai historical drama series based on a script by Rompaeng. It is a sequel to the television drama Love Destiny, which was adapted from the famous novel of the same name, and produced by Broadcast Thai Television Co., Ltd. It stars Thanavat Vatthanaputi and Ranee Campen. This sequel still has Salaya Sukanivatt as the scriptwriter from the first part.

== Production ==
Initially, Arunocha Panupan, the producer, appointed Mai Phawhat Panangkasiri, the director from the first part, to direct it, but later changed to Saraswati Wongsomphet, the director of Shadow of Love, to take over the role.

The fitting of the actors' clothing was on September 30, 2021, and the blessing ceremony on Thursday, November 4, 2021 at Nong Khaem Studio. Saraswati gave an interview with the Bangkokbiz newspaper that 40-50 queues have already been filmed but has to be halted intermittently due to the COVID-19 pandemic.

On Monday, October 10, 2022, the first teaser trailer was released alongside other television series.

On October 5, 2023, the drama organizers and actors, held another drama sacrifice to mark the auspicious time before broadcasting at the Channel 3 studio, Nong Khaem. For Love Destiny 2 to Love Destiny, it is the first Thai drama to have IP rights registered to prevent copying and commercial use, with the copyright registration covering everything from the drama to expanding advertising and various content in the future.

== Cast ==
=== Main ===
- Thanavat Vatthanaputi as Dech / Por Rueng / Por Rit
- Ranee Campen as Karaket / Ketsurang / Puttarn
- Warintorn Panhakarn as King Thai Sa
- Denkhun Ngamnet as Borommakot
- Pichukkana Wongsarattanasin as Mae Klin
- Thakoon Karntip as Mu Song
- Phatrakorn Boosarakumwadi as Mae Kaeo
- Punpreedee Khumprom Rodsaward as Mae Prang
- Kanokchat Munyad-On as Ming
- Thakrit Tawanpong as Phraya Ratchasakun (Thong-kham)
- Tadsapon Wiwitawan as In
- Chamaiporn Jarturaput as Lady Champa
- Rudklao Amratisha as Grandma Kui
- Witsarut Himmarat as Choi
- Ramida Prapasanobon as Yaem
- Janya Thanasawangkul as Phin
- Patarapon To-Oun as Phoem
- Dandao Yamapai as Ueng
- Aumpa Phusit as Prik
- Vimolphan Chaleejunghran as Chuang
- Phusaya Naksawat as Im
- Thanchanok Yutthasarnsiri as

=== Guest ===
- Nawasch Phupantachsee as General Anilbot
- Phulita Supinchompo as Princess Aditiya
- Khanin Chobbradit as Thikamporn Raja
- Sirilak Kwong as Phranang Chantarawadee
- Prama Imanotai as Rueang / Rueangrit (Monk)
- Kannarun Wongkajornklai as Lady Chanwat
- Jirayu Tantrakul as Suriyenthrathibodi
- Surira Angelina Naenna as Maria Guyomar de Pinha
- Thunyaphat Phataraterachaijaroen as Phraechin
- Preeyakarn Jaikanta as Riam
- Sarut Vichitrananda as Phetracha
- Praptpadol Suwanbang as King Narai
- Chartchai Ngamsan as Kosa Pan
- Tachaya Prathumwan as Pra Py
- Kanin Stanley as George Phaulkon
- Chanoksuda Raksanaves as Queen consort of Borommakot
- Wissawawit Wongwanlop as Phraya Chula Ratchamontri (Kaeo)
- Visarut Hirunbuth as Kham
- Atiwat Saengtien as Chamnan Borirak
- Chartayodom Hiranyasthiti as Phraya Kosathibodi (Chin)
- Kwanrudee Klomklorm as Krom Phra Thephamat (Gun) / Grand empress dowager
- Nattarinee Karnasuta as Lady Phong
- Wacharachai Soontornsiri as Chee Pa Khao (Priest)
- Passin Ruangvuth as Phra Ong Chao Dam
- Chotiros Kaewpinit as Phra Ong Chao Kaeo
- Chai Khunsriruksa as Fanik Guyomar
- Naruemon Pongsupap as Grandma Kloi
- Ponlawit Ketprapakorn as Por Wek
- Bunjerdsri Yamapai as Grandma Nuan
- Mayurin Pongpudpunth as Wipawee
- Paweena Chariffskul as Maechi Si Pang
- Danai Charuchinta as Chaimit
- Patsachon Supree as Wipawan
- Nutthacha Nina Jessica Padovan as Puttarn (Young)

== Original soundtrack ==
- "Phrom likhit" (พรหมลิขิต), opening theme by Teeranai Na Nongkhai and Apiwat Ueathavornsuk
- "Khiang khwan" (เคียงขวัญ), ending theme by Napat Injaiuea
- "Kham we-la" (ข้ามเวลา), ending theme by Violette Wautier
