= List of awards and nominations received by Urassaya Sperbund =

Urassaya Sperbund awards and nominations
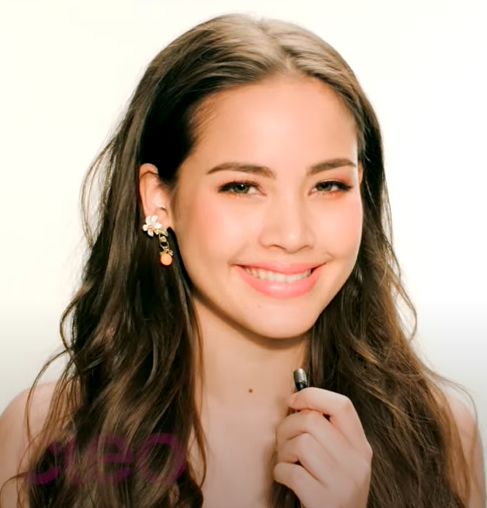
- Urassaya in July 2018
Awards and nominations
Award	Wins	Nominations
Bangkok Critics Assembly Awards	0	2
Kom Chad Luek Awards	5	12
Nataraja Awards	1	10
Starpics Thai Film Awards	0	2
Suphannahong National Film Awards	2	3
Thai Film Director Awards	1	2
TV Gold Awards	1	7

Totals (Note: Certain award groups do not simply award one winner. They acknowledge several different recipients, have runners-up, and have third place. Since this is a specific recognition and is different from losing an award, runner-up mentions are considered wins in this award tally. For simplification and to avoid errors, each award in this list has been presumed to have had a prior nomination.)
- Wins: 87
- Nominations: 189

Urassaya Sperbund is a Thai actress and model who has received multiple awards and nominations throughout her career, including a Nataraja Awards, two Suphannahong National Film Awards, a Thai Film Director Awards, and a TV Gold Awards

== Major associations ==
=== Bangkok Critics Assembly Awards ===
Year	Category	Nominated work	Result	Ref.
2019	Best Actress	Brother of the Year	Nominated	
2023	Best Actress	Fast and Feel Love	Nominated	

=== Kom Chad Luek Awards ===
Year	Category	Nominated work	Result	Ref.
2020	Best Actress – Television	Klin Kasalong	Nominated	
2023	Best Ensemble Cast (Note: shared with the cast)	Fast and Feel Love	Nominated	
2025	Best Actress – Film	Love You to Debt	Nominated	

=== Nataraja Awards ===
Year	Category	Nominated work	Result	Ref.
2011	Best Ensemble Cast	4 Hua Jai Haeng Khun Khao	Nominated	
2012	Best Actress	Tawan Deard	Nominated	
2012	Best Ensemble Cast	Tawan Deard	Nominated	
2018	Best Ensemble Cast	Khluen Chiwit	Nominated	
2019	Best Ensemble Cast	The Crown Princess	Nominated	
2020	Best Actress	Klin Kasalong	Nominated	
2023	Best Actress	Bad Romeo	Won	
2023	Best Ensemble Cast	The Kinnaree Conspiracy	Nominated	
2025	Best Actress	My Cherie Amour	Nominated	
2026	Best Actress	Dalah Death and the Flowers	Nominated	

=== Starpics Thai Film Awards ===
Year	Category	Nominated work	Result	Ref.
2019	Best Actress	Brother of the Year	Nominated	
2023	Best Actress	Fast and Feel Love	Nominated	

=== Suphannahong National Film Awards ===
Year	Category	Nominated work	Result	Ref.
2019	Best Actress	Brother of the Year	Won	
2023	Best Actress	Fast and Feel Love	Won	
2025	Best Actress	Love You to Debt	Nominated	

=== Thai Film Director Awards ===
Year	Category	Nominated work	Result	Ref.
2019	Best Actress	Brother of the Year	Won	
2023	Best Ensemble Cast	Fast and Feel Love	Nominated	

=== TV Gold Awards ===
Year	Category	Nominated work	Result	Ref.
2012	Outstanding Lead Actress	Game Rai Game Rak	Nominated	
2018	Outstanding Lead Actress	Khluen Chiwit	Won	
2019	Outstanding Lead Actress	The Crown Princess	Nominated	
2020	Outstanding Lead Actress	Klin Kasalong	Nominated	
2023	Outstanding Lead Actress	Bad Romeo	Nominated	
2025	Outstanding Lead Actress	My Cherie Amour	Nominated	

== Miscellaneous accolades ==
Name of the award, year presented, category, nominee(s) of the award, and the result of the nomination
Award	Year	Category	Nominee(s)/work(s)	Result	Ref.
Asia Top Awards	2025	Best Actress	My Cherie Amour	Won	
Bun Therng 5 Na 1 Awards	2011	Best Actress	Game Rai Game Rak	Nominated	
Bun Therng 5 Na 1 Awards	2011	Media Darling	Urassaya Sperbund	Nominated	
Dao Mekkala Awards	2014	Couple of the Year – Television (Note: shared with Nadech Kugimiya)	Urassaya Sperbund	Won	
Dao Mekkala Awards	2016	Most Popular Actress	Urassaya Sperbund	Won	
Feed x Khaosod Awards	2025	Actress of the Year – Series or Television	Dalah: Death and the Flowers	Nominated	
Golden Kinnaree Awards	2025	Best Actress	My Cherie Amour	Won	
Hamburger Awards	2011	The Next Female Icon	Urassaya Sperbund	Won	
Hamburger Awards	2015	Pop Icon	Urassaya Sperbund	Won	
Harper’s Bazaar Women of the Year	2025	Most Influential – Actress	Urassaya Sperbund	Won	
Intensive Watch	2014	Top Radio Songs Artist – October (Note: shared with Nadech Kugimiya for "Laew Rao Ja Dai Rak Gan Mai")	Roy Fun Tawan Duerd	Won	
Kom Chad Luek Awards	2025	Costume to Promote Thai Identity – Actress	Urassaya Sperbund	Nominated	
Mekkhala Awards	2012	Outstanding Lead Actress	Game Rai Game Rak	Nominated	
Mekkhala Awards	2013	Outstanding Lead Actress	Torranee Ni Nee Krai Krong	Won	
New York Asian Film Festival	2022	Rising Star Asia Award	Fast and Feel Love	Won	
Nine Entertain Awards	2018	Actress of the Year	Urassaya Sperbund	Nominated	
Nine Entertain Awards	2023	Actress of the Year	Urassaya Sperbund	Nominated	
Oops! Awards	2011	Couple of the Year	Game Rai Game Rak	Won	
Seesun Bun Therng Awards	2011	Female Rising Star	Kularb Rai Narm, Duang Jai Akkanee	Won	
Seesun Bun Therng Awards	2012	Couple of the Year	Game Rai Game Rak	Won	
Seesun Bun Therng Awards	2014	Charming Girl	Roy Fun Tawan Duerd	Won	
Seesun Bun Therng Awards	2017	Couple of the Year	Leh Lub Salub Rarng	Won	
Seesun Bun Therng Awards	2019	Best Actress	Klin Kasalong	Won	
Siamdara Star Awards	2011	Best New Actress – Television	Duang Jai Akkanee	Won	
Siamdara Star Awards	2012	Best Actress – Television	Game Rai Game Rak	Nominated	
Siamdara Star Awards	2018	Best Actress – Film	Brother of the Year	Won	
Siamdara Star Awards	2018	Best Actress – Television	Khluen Chiwit	Nominated	
Starlight Awards	2013	Charming Girl	Urassaya Sperbund	Won	
Star's Choice Awards	2012	Charming Girl	Urassaya Sperbund	Won	
Thailand Zocial Awards	2020	Best Entertainment Performance on Pantip – Actors	Urassaya Sperbund	Won	
Top Awards	2011	Female Rising Star – Television	Duang Jai Akkanee	Won	
Top Awards	2013	Best Actress – Television	Torranee Ni Nee Krai Krong	Nominated	
TrustGu Thai Film Awards	2023	Best Actress	Fast and Feel Love	Won	
TrustGu Thai Film Awards	2025	Best Actress	Love You to Debt	Nominated	
TVpool Stars Party Awards	2011	Photographer's Favorite	Urassaya Sperbund	Won	
TVpool Stars Party Awards	2012	Charming Girl	Urassaya Sperbund	Won	

== Audience awards ==
Name of the award, year presented, category, nominee(s) of the award, and the result of the nomination
Award	Year	Category	Nominee(s)/work(s)	Result	Ref.
Bang Awards	2011	Girl of the Year	Urassaya Sperbund	Nominated	
Bang Awards	2012	Girl of the Year	Urassaya Sperbund	Won	
Bang Awards	2012	Couple of the Year	Urassaya Sperbund	Nominated	
Crow Love Like Awards	2013	Climax – Actress	Urassaya Sperbund	Won	
Daradaily The Great Awards	2011	New Star of the Year – Female	4 Hua Jai Haeng Khun Khao	Won	
Daradaily The Great Awards	2013	Actress of the Year – Television	Torranee Ni Nee Krai Krong	Nominated	
Daradaily The Great Awards	2013	Hot Girl of the Year	Urassaya Sperbund	Won	
Daradaily The Great Awards	2014	Actress of the Year – Television	Dao Raung	Nominated	
Daradaily The Great Awards	2014	Hot Girl of the Year	Urassaya Sperbund	Won	
Daradaily The Great Awards	2014	Daradaily Front Page Darling of the Year	Urassaya Sperbund	Nominated	
Daradaily The Great Awards	2015	Actress of the Year – Television	Roy Fun Tawan Duerd	Nominated	
Daradaily The Great Awards	2015	Hot Girl of the Year	Urassaya Sperbund	Won	
Daradaily The Great Awards	2016	Hot Girl of the Year	Urassaya Sperbund	Won	
Daradaily The Great Awards	2017	Hot Girl of the Year	Urassaya Sperbund	Won	
Daradaily The Great Awards	2018	Hot Girl of the Year	Urassaya Sperbund	Won	
Daradaily The Great Awards	2018	Popular Vote – Female	Urassaya Sperbund	Nominated	
Daradaily The Great Awards	2019	Actress of the Year – Film	Brother of the Year	Won	
Daradaily The Great Awards	2019	Popular Vote – Female	Urassaya Sperbund	Won	
Daradaily The Great Awards	2019	Hot Girl of the Year	Urassaya Sperbund	Nominated	
EFM Awards	2014	Most Popular Star – September	Roy Fun Tawan Duerd	Nominated	
EFM Awards	2014	Favorite Song – September	Roy Fun Tawan Duerd	Won	
ET Thailand Awards	2018	Most Popular Star	Urassaya Sperbund	Nominated	
Gmember Awards	2015	Song of the Year – OST	Roy Fun Tawan Duerd	Won	
Great Stars Social Awards	2019	Actress of the Year	Urassaya Sperbund	Nominated	
Kazz Awards	2012	Female Superstar of the Year	Urassaya Sperbund	Won	
Kazz Awards	2014	Female Superstar of the Year	Urassaya Sperbund	Nominated	
Kazz Awards	2014	Most Popular Actress	Urassaya Sperbund	Nominated	
Kazz Awards	2014	Couple of the Year	Urassaya Sperbund	Nominated	
Kazz Awards	2015	Female Superstar of the Year	Urassaya Sperbund	Won	
Kazz Awards	2016	Popular Vote – Female	Urassaya Sperbund	Nominated	
Kazz Awards	2017	Popular Vote – Female	Urassaya Sperbund	Nominated	
Kazz Awards	2020	Most Popular Actress	Urassaya Sperbund	Nominated	
Kerd Awards	2012	Most Burning Star	Urassaya Sperbund	Nominated	
Kerd Awards	2012	Best Couple	Game Rai Game Rak	Won	
Kom Chad Luek Awards	2012	Most Popular Actress	Urassaya Sperbund	Won	
Kom Chad Luek Awards	2013	Most Popular Actress	Urassaya Sperbund	Won	
Kom Chad Luek Awards	2014	Most Popular Actress	Urassaya Sperbund	Won	
Kom Chad Luek Awards	2015	Most Popular Actress	Urassaya Sperbund	Won	
Kom Chad Luek Awards	2016	Most Popular Actress	Urassaya Sperbund	Won	
Kom Chad Luek Awards	2019	Most Popular Actress	Urassaya Sperbund	Nominated	
Kom Chad Luek Awards	2020	Most Popular Actress	Urassaya Sperbund	Nominated	
Kom Chad Luek Awards	2023	Most Popular Couple	Urassaya Sperbund	Nominated	
Maya Awards	2015	Best Actress – Television	Roy Fun Tawan Duerd	Nominated	
Maya Awards	2015	Favorite Song	Roy Fun Tawan Duerd	Nominated	
Maya Awards	2015	Best Couple	Urassaya Sperbund	Nominated	
Maya Awards	2016	Best Actress – Television	Neung Nai Suang	Nominated	
Maya Awards	2016	Best Couple	Urassaya Sperbund	Nominated	
Maya Awards	2018	Best Actress – Film	Brother of the Year	Won	
Maya Awards	2018	Charming Girl	Urassaya Sperbund	Nominated	
Maya Awards	2018	Best Couple	Urassaya Sperbund	Nominated	
Maya Awards	2019	Best Couple	Urassaya Sperbund	Nominated	
Maya Awards	2020	Best Actress – Television	Klin Kasalong	Nominated	
Maya Awards	2020	Charming Girl	Urassaya Sperbund	Nominated	
Maya Awards	2022	Charming Girl	Urassaya Sperbund	Nominated	
Mekkhala Awards	2012	Most Popular Actress	Game Rai Game Rak	Won	
Mekkhala Awards	2013	Most Popular Actress	Torranee Ni Nee Krai Krong	Won	
Mthai Top Talk-About Awards	2011	Top Talk-About Actress	Kularb Rai Narm, Duang Jai Akkanee	Won	
Mthai Top Talk-About Awards	2012	Top Talk-About Character Couples	Game Rai Game Rak	Won	
Mthai Top Talk-About Awards	2018	Top Talk-About Actress	Leh Lub Salub Rarng	Nominated	
Mthai Top Talk-About Awards	2019	Top Talk-About Actress	The Crown Princess	Nominated	
Nakkharat Awards	2016	Most Popular Actress	Urassaya Sperbund	Won	
Nakkharat Awards	2016	Couple of the Year	Urassaya Sperbund	Nominated	
Nakkharat Awards	2017	Most Popular Actress	Urassaya Sperbund	Won	
Nakkharat Awards	2017	Couple of the Year	Urassaya Sperbund	Nominated	
Nakkharat Awards	2018	Most Popular Actress	Urassaya Sperbund	Won	
Nine Entertain Awards	2012	Most Popular Star	Urassaya Sperbund	Nominated	
Nine Entertain Awards	2013	Most Popular Star	Urassaya Sperbund	Nominated	
Nine Entertain Awards	2014	Most Popular Star	Urassaya Sperbund	Nominated	
Nine Entertain Awards	2016	Most Popular Star	Urassaya Sperbund	Nominated	
Nine Entertain Awards	2017	Most Popular Star	Urassaya Sperbund	Nominated	
Nine Entertain Awards	2018	Most Popular Star	Urassaya Sperbund	Nominated	
OK! Awards	2011	Male Heartthrob	Urassaya Sperbund	Won	
OK! Awards	2012	Male Heartthrob	Urassaya Sperbund	Won	
OK! Awards	2013	Male Heartthrob	Urassaya Sperbund	Won	
OK! Awards	2014	Male Heartthrob	Urassaya Sperbund	Won	
OK! Awards	2015	Male Heartthrob	Urassaya Sperbund	Won	
OK! Awards	2017	OK's Sweetheart	Urassaya Sperbund	Won	
Sanook	2018	Dream Girl	Urassaya Sperbund	Won	
Sanook	2023	Most Popular Actress	Bad Romeo	Won	
Sanook	2025	Most Popular Actress	My Cherie Amour	Nominated	
Seed Awards	2015	Favorite Song	Roy Fun Tawan Duerd	Won	
Seventeen Choice Awards	2010	Choice Hottie Female	Urassaya Sperbund	Won	
Seventeen Choice Awards	2011	Choice Hottie Female	Urassaya Sperbund	Won	
Seventeen Choice Awards	2012	Choice Hottie Female	Urassaya Sperbund	Won	
Seventeen Choice Awards	2013	Choice Actress	Urassaya Sperbund	Won	
Seventeen Choice Awards	2014	Choice Hottie Female	Urassaya Sperbund	Won	
Seventeen Choice Awards	2015	Choice Hottie Female	Urassaya Sperbund	Won	
Siamdara Star Awards	2012	Siamdara's Sweetheart	Urassaya Sperbund	Won	
Siamdara Star Awards	2012	Siamdara Star Popular Vote – Female	Urassaya Sperbund	Nominated	
Siamdara Star Awards	2013	Siamdara Star Popular Vote – Female	Urassaya Sperbund	Won	
Siamdara Star Awards	2014	Siamdara Star Popular Vote – Female	Urassaya Sperbund	Nominated	
Siamdara Star Awards	2015	Siamdara Star Popular Vote – Female	Urassaya Sperbund	Won	
Siamdara Star Awards	2016	Siamdara Star Popular Vote – Female	Urassaya Sperbund	Won	
Social Star Awards	2023	Best Social Media Influencer	Urassaya Sperbund	Nominated	
Sudsapda Young & Smart Vote	2010	Most Popular Model	Urassaya Sperbund	Nominated	
Sudsapda Young & Smart Vote	2011	Most Popular Actress	Urassaya Sperbund	Nominated	
Sudsapda Young & Smart Vote	2012	Most Popular Actress	Urassaya Sperbund	Nominated	
Superstar Idol Awards	2025	Superstar Best Actress	My Cherie Amour	Nominated	
Thailand Box Office Movie & Series Awards	2025	Actress of the Year	Love You to Debt	Nominated	
The Standard	2018	Person of the Year	Urassaya Sperbund	Nominated	
The Viral Hits Awards	2025	Best Leading Actress of the Year	Urassaya Sperbund	Nominated	
The Viral Hits Awards	2025	Best Viral Creator of the Year	Urassaya Sperbund	Nominated	
The Viral Hits Awards	2026	Mainstream Leading Performer	Urassaya Sperbund	Nominated	
The Viral Hits Awards	2026	Viral Moment That United Hearts	Urassaya Sperbund	Nominated	
TrueLife Awards	2015	Actress of the Year	Roy Fun Tawan Duerd	Won	
TrueLife Awards	2016	Actress of the Year	Neung Nai Suang	Nominated	
TV Gold Awards	2019	Best Actress	Urassaya Sperbund	Nominated	
TV3 Fanclub Awards	2011	Most Popular Female Rising Star	Urassaya Sperbund	Won	
TV3 Fanclub Awards	2012	Most Popular Actress	Urassaya Sperbund	Won	
TV3 Fanclub Awards	2013	Most Popular Actress	Urassaya Sperbund	Won	
TV3 Fanclub Awards	2014	Most Popular Actress	Urassaya Sperbund	Won	
TV3 Fanclub Awards	2015	Most Popular Actress	Urassaya Sperbund	Won	
TV3 Fanclub Awards	2016	Most Popular Actress	Urassaya Sperbund	Won	
Tvpool Stars Party Retire & Reborn	2022	Charming Girl	Urassaya Sperbund	Nominated	
Tvpool Stars Party Retire & Reborn	2022	Most Popular Actress	Urassaya Sperbund	Nominated	

== Fashion awards ==
Name of the award, year presented, category, and the result of the nomination
Award	Year	Category	Result	Ref.
Cheeze Awards	2012	Style Icon	Won	
Zen Stylish Awards	2014	Style of the Year – Female	Won	

== Other accolades ==
=== State honors ===
Name of country or organization, year given, and name of honor
Country or organization	Year	Honor	Ref.
Ministry of Culture	2019	Promoting the value of Lan Na Culture	

=== Listicles ===
Name of publisher, year listed, name of listicle, and placement
Publisher	Year	Listicle	Placement	Ref.
Business of Fashion (Note: The BoF 500 is an annual fashion industry power list of figures leading the global fashion industry.)	2018	BoF 500	Placed	
Daradaily	2012	Most Influential Stars in Entertainment	Placed	
Forbes	2020	100 Digital Stars (Asia)	Placed	
NIDA	2014	10 Most Influential Actors in the 2010s	7th	
Vogue	2018	Vogue World 100	Placed	
Vogue	2021	100 Most Influential People in Thai Fashion	Placed	
