= Chaleumpol Tikumpornteerawong =

Thai actor (born 1989)

- เฉลิมพล ทิฆัมพรธีรวงศ์
- Born: Ananda Matthew Everingham; 13 June 1989 (age 37); Muak Lek, Saraburi, Thailand
- Occupations: Actor; singer; mc; youtuber
- Years active: 2001–present
- Height: 5 ft 9 in (1.75 m)
- Spouse: Kittiya Jitpakdee (2024–present)
- Children: Kaki (boy, 28.Juli.2024)

Chaleumpol Tikumpornteerawong (Thai: เฉลิมพล ทิฆัมพรธีรวงศ์; born 13 June 1989) is an actor. He graduated from Rangsit University.

== Discography ==
=== Film ===
- Why want to commerdian /ทำไมต้องเป็นตลก (2001)
- Fan Chan (2003)
- Dek Den / เด็กเดน (2005)
- Dorm (2006)
- Seasons Change (2006)
- Lucky Loser (2006)
- The Possible (2006)
- Ma-Mha (2007)
- Hormones (2008)
- Friendship (2008)
- Best of Times (2009)
- Bangkok Traffic Love Story (2009)
- ATM: Er Rak Error (2012)
- Seven Something (2012)
- Brother Of The Year (2018 film) (2018)

=== Television dramas ===
- Kru Wai Jai Rai / ครูไหวใจร้าย
- Butterfly and Flowers
- Game Rai Game Rak
- Torranee Ni Nee Krai Krong
- Ab Ruk Online
- 2009 Ruk Nee Kiang Tawan (รักนี้เคียงตะวัน) (MEDIA OFF MEDIA/Ch.7) as ()
- 2009 Fai Shone Sang (ไฟโชนแสง) (Good Feeling/Ch.3) as Lo' (หล่อ)
- 2010 Butterfly and Flowers (ผีเสื้อและดอกไม้) (/Thai PBS) as (อาเดล)
- 2010 Seub Suan Puan Ruk (2010) (สืบสวนป่วนรัก) (GEINOKAI/Ch.3) as (เอกมันต์ (รับเชิญ))
- 2011 Som Waan Namtarn Priew (ส้มหวานน้ำตาลเปรี้ยว) (MEDIA OFF MEDIA/Ch.7) as Thongchai (Tou) (ธงชัย (ตือ))
- 2011 Hor Heu Heu (หอ หึ หึ) (MAKER K/Ch.3) as Boriboon (บริบูรณ์)
- 2011 Suepsuan Puan Kamlang 3 (สืบสวนป่วนกำลังสาม) (GEINOKAI/Ch.3) as (เอกมันต์)
- 2011 Game Rai Game Rak (เกมร้ายเกมรัก) (Lakornthai/Ch.3) as Taeloy (แตลอย (ลอย))
- 2012 Meu Prab Por Look Orn (มือปราบพ่อลูกอ่อน) (Cholumpi Production/Ch.3) as (ปาล์ม)
- 2012 Torranee Ni Nee Krai Krong (ธรณีนี่นี้ใครครอง) (No Problem/Ch.3) as Aueng (อึ่ง)
- 2012 Manee Dan Suaang (มณีแดนสรวง) (Broadcast Thai Television/Ch.3) as (จิตราสูร)
- 2012 Panyachon Kon Krua (ปัญญาชนก้นครัว) (Thong Entertainment/Ch.3) as Wan (แว่น)
- 2012 Jao Mae Jum Pen (เจ้าแม่จำเป็น) (Exact-Scenario/Ch.5) as Koy (ก๋อย)
- 2013 Khun Chai Taratorn (สุภาพบุรุษจุฑาเทพ ตอน คุณชายธราธร) (Maker Y Group/Ch.3) as Udom (อุดม)
- 2013 Dao Raung (ดาวเรือง) (Feel Good Entertainment/Ch.3) as (แหลม)
- 2013 Peak Marn (ปีกมาร) (Exact-Scenario/Ch.5) as Phaluk (ผลึก)
- 2014 Kularb Rai Kong Naai Tawan (กุหลาบร้ายของนายตะวัน) (Polyplus Entertainment/Ch.7) as Yae (แย้)
- 2015 Ab Ruk Online (แอบรักออนไลน์) (Thong Entertainment/Ch.3) as Sahus (สหัส (รับเชิญ))
- 2015 Baan Sao Sila Hua Dang (บ้านศิลาแดง) (Polyplus Entertainment/Ch.7) as Golf (กอล์ฟ)
- 2016 Piang Chai Kon Nee Mai Chai Poo Wised (เพียงชายคนนี้ไม่ใช่ผู้วิเศษ) (Thong Entertainment/Ch.3) as A-Sao (แอเซาะ (รับเชิญ)) with Wiragarn Seneetunti
- 2016 Raeng Tawan (แรงตะวัน) (LOVE DRAMA/Ch.3) as Seur Krohng (เสือโคร่ง)
- 2016 Butsaba Na Talat (บุษบาหน้าตลาด) (Step Aonvert/Ch.3) as Dung (ดุ้ง)
- 2017 Lah (ล่า) (The One Enterprise/One 31) as Man (อรรถพล เก่งเมือง (แมน))
- 2018 Khun Chai Kai Tong (คุณชายไก่โต้ง) (Polyplus Entertainment/Ch.7) as Pong (ป๋อง)
- 2018 Pan Ta Gaan Ruk (พันธกานต์รัก) (Prakotkarndee/Ch.7) as Max (แม็กซ์)
- 2018 Mee Piang Rak (มีเพียงรัก Secret Moon) (/Ch.3) as Jitrit (จิ๊ดริ๊ด)
- 2019 Tukta Phee (ตุ๊กตาผี) (Kantana Group/Ch.3) as Moo Tun (หมูตุ๋น)
- 2019 Kaew Klang Dong (แก้วกลางดง) (/Ch.3) as Fah Lan (ฟ้าลั่น)
- 2019 My Love From Another Star (ลิขิตรักข้ามดวงดาว) (Broadcast Thai Television/Ch.3) as Chong (ช่อง (รับเชิญ))
- 2019 Jun Krajang Tee Klang Thung (จันทร์กระจ่างที่กลางทุ่ง) (/Ch.7) as Dam (ดำ)
- 2020 Trab Fah Mee Tawan (ตราบฟ้ามีตะวัน) (Sonix Boom 2013/Ch.3) as Saeb (แสบ)
- 2021 Kaen Kaew (แก่นแก้ว) (Family Plus/Ch.3) as Perng (เปิง)
- 2022 Sarb Sorn Ruk (สาปซ่อนรัก) (TV Scene & Picture/Ch.3) as Marut Phanpum (Boem) (มารุต พันธ์พุ่ม (เบิ้ม))
- 2022 Pong Lang Hak On Son (โปงลางฮักออนซอน) (Family Plus/Ch.3) as Copter (คอปเตอร์) with Saranchat Mitchai

=== Television series ===
- 2004 Kru Wai Jai Rai (ครูไหวใจร้าย) (Broadcast Thai Television/Ch.3) as Keng (young) (เก่ง (ตอนเด็ก))
- 2009 (สายลับเดอะซีรีส์ กับ 24 คดีสุดห้ามใจ) (/Ch.9) as Kha-nun ()
- 2010 Chocolate 5 Reudoo (ช็อกโกแลต 5 ฤดู) (/Ch.9) as Pib ()
- 2011 Muad Ohpas (หมวดโอภาส ตอน บัวขวัญเธออยู่ไหน) (/Ch.9) as (Invited actor) ()
- 2013 (My Melody 360 องศารัก) (/Ch.9) as Jack ()
- 2013 ATM 2: Koo ver Error Er Rak (ATM 2 คู่เว่อ..เออเร่อ..เออรัก) (GDH 559/Ch.9) as Paed ()
- 2013 (แจ๊ค เดอะสายลับ (GTH side stories)) (/One 31) as Jack ()
- 2016 Gasohug (แก๊สโซฮัก..รักเต็มถัง) (GDH 559/Line TV) as ()
- 2017 Teenage Mom: The Series (คุณแม่วัยใส The Series) (GMM Grammy-GMMTV-Line TV/One 31) as Pose (Guest role)
- 2017 Diary Tootsies The Series Season 2 (ไดอารี่ตุ๊ดซี่ส์ เดอะ ซีรีส์ ซีซั่น 2) (GDH 559/GMM 25) as (Guest role)
- 2019 Likit Cheewit Ep.5 Jone Jai Barb (ลิขิตชีวิต ตอนที่ 5 โจรใจบาป) (/Ch.8) as Pong ()
- 2019 Sucker Kick (Sucker Kick สู้ตาย!! นายกระจับ) (/LINE TV) as Sa-Tad (สตั๊ด)
- 2020 Kit Hot Tai Baan Esan (คิดฮอดไทบ้าน อีสานซีรีส์) (/GMM 25) as Jo (โจ้)
- 2021 Girl2K (สาวออฟฟิศ 2000 ปี) (The One Enterprise-GMMTV/GMM 25) as Oab () with Passakorn Ponlaboon

=== Television sitcom ===
- 2007 Bannee Merak (บ้านนี้มีรัก ตอนที่ 00 ชอบโยนความผิดให้คนอื่น) (/Ch.9) as Ar-Non (Mee-Pu) (อานนท์ (หมีพู) (รับเชิญ))
- 2010 (เนื้อคู่ประตูถัดไป) (GMM Tai Hub/Ch.5) as Chatree Payakorn (ชาตรี พยากรณ์)
- 2010 (เนื้อคู่อยากรู้ว่าใคร) (GMM Tai Hub/Ch.5) as Chatree Payakorn (ชาตรี พยากรณ์)
- 2010 (ระเบิดเถิดเทิง ลั่นทุ่ง) (Workpoint Entertainment/Ch.5) as Lam (หลาม)
- 201ุ6 Ha Unlimited (2015) (บริษัทฮาไม่จำกัด) (ZENSE Entertainment/Mono 29) as ()
- 2017 Khunjai Thailand (ขวัญใจไทยแลนด์) (/Workpoint TV) as Nam-Pu (น้ำพุ)
- 2018 (สภากาแฟ 4.0) (Amarin Group/Amarin TV) as Kob (ก็อบ)
- 2018 (คิดดีคลินิก) (GDH 559/PPTVHD36) as Job (จ็อบ)
- 2019 Yam Puan Guan Hua Jai (ยามป่วนกวนหัวใจ) (Mongkoldee Production/Ch.7) as Tony (โทนี่)
- 2020 (เสือ ชะนี เก้ง 2020 ฤดูกาลที่ 5 ตอนที่ 00) (The One Enterprise/One 31) as Yod (ยศ (รับเชิญ))

=== Music video ===
Year	Song title	English Title	Artist	Notes	Ref.
2012	เสียงเพลงในใจฉัน		S.D.F		
2020	เกิดมาเพื่ออกหัก		The song itself		

=== MC ===
Television

- 2016 (ตื่นมาคุย) (/Ch.9) (2016)
- 2018 (Davinci เกมถอดรหัส) (SEARCH Entertainment, CLICK CREATIVE/Ch.3) (2018-2019)
- 2021 (แฉ) (/GMM 25) (2021-)
- 2021 (Atime Showcaze) (A Time Media/A Time Media) (2021-)
- 2021 (ฮัลโหลซุปตาร์พาเที่ยว) (/Ch.7) (2021-)
- 2023 Late Night Game () (Mainstand Creator (Thailand)/Ch.9) With Yuthana Boonorm, Kapol Thongplub, Kiattisak Udomnak, Jittakorn Srikhamkhrua, Suvinai Potipairoad Every Monday and Tuesday from 10:30 PM to 11:30 PM (starting Monday, February 6, 2023-)

Online

- 2021 (แจ็คขอคุย) (YouTube:Jackfanchan)
- 2021 (ขอของดารา EP.1) (YouTube:Jackfanchan)
- 2021 (แฟนฉัน 1 คืน - EP.1) (YouTube:Jackfanchan)

== Discography ==
=== Songs ===
Year	Song title	English Title	Note	Ref.
2008	สนิทกันแต่ไม่สนิทใจ		Sick Project รักเป็นบ้า	
2008	คนดี (ที่หน้าตาไม่ดี)		Sick Project รักเป็นบ้า	
2020	เกิดมาเพื่ออกหัก		Single	

== Live shows ==
=== Stage play ===
Year	Title	Role	Place	Date	Ref.
20					

=== Concert ===
Year	Title	Place	Date	Ref.
20				

- STAR THEQUE GTH 11 years (2015)
