= Urassaya Sperbund =

Thai actress (born 1993)

- อุรัสยา เสปอร์บันด์
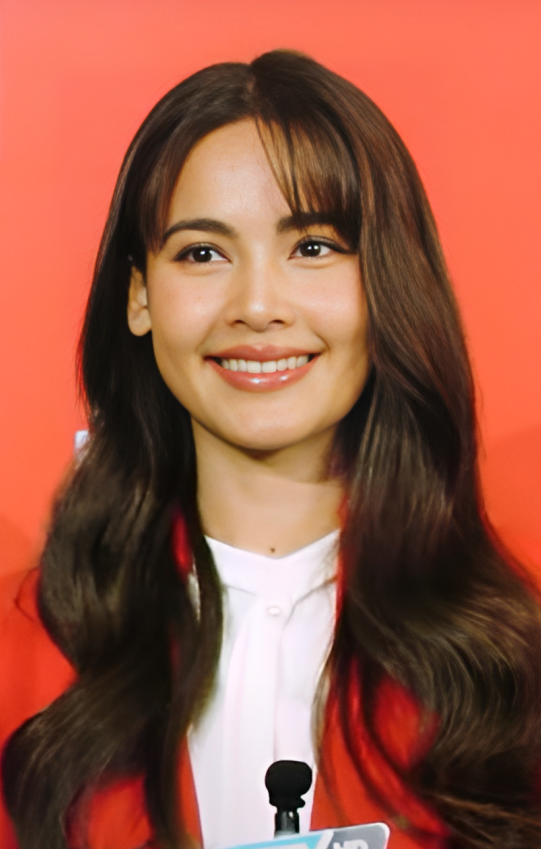
- Urassaya in 2022
- Born: 18 March 1993 (age 33); Pattaya, Chonburi, Thailand
- Other name: Yaya
- Education: Chulalongkorn University (BA)
- Occupations: Actress; model
- Years active: 2008–present
- Agent: Channel 3
- Spouse: Nadech Kugimiya (m. 2026)
- Awards: Full list
- Website: urassayaclub.com

Urassaya Sperbund (Note: Thai: อุรัสยา เสปอร์บันด์, RTGS: Uratsaya Sapoeban, Thai pronunciation: [ʔù.rát.sa.jāː.sa.pɤː.ban]) (born March 18, 1993), nicknamed Yaya (Thai: ญาญ่า), is a Thai actress and model. She is the recipient of numerous accolades including; two Suphannahong National Film Awards, a TV Gold Award, a Nataraj Award, and three Mekhala Awards.

Urassaya began her acting career with the 2008 comedy sitcom Peun See Long Hon. She received greater recognition with lead roles in Duang Jai Akkanee (2010), Game Rai Game Rak (2011), Torranee Ni Nee Krai Krong (2012), Khluen Chiwit (2017), and The Crown Princess (2018).

Urassaya's film roles include Brother of the Year, Nakee 2 (2018), and Fast And Feel Love (2022). For Brother of the Year and Fast And Feel Love, she won the Suphannahong National Film Award for Best Actress.

== Early life ==
Urassaya Sperbund was born on March 18, 1993, in Pattaya, Chonburi province. Her father, Sigurd, is Norwegian and worked as a stockbroker. Her mother, Urai, was a homemaker, originally from Thailand. She has one older sister, Cattleya. Urassaya attended Regent's International School Pattaya, remaining there until 2009, before transferring to Bangkok Patana School. In 2015, she graduated from the Faculty of Arts of Chulalongkorn University with a Bachelor of Arts degree in language and culture.

Urassaya did her first modeling assignment at the age of 13 as after being approached by a casting director in Chatuchak Park. She appeared in several ads for Genie Young Care Cologne before stopping due to travel difficulties. She eventually returned to modeling after being approached by Sombatsara Teerasaroch. To help Urassaya enter into the entertainment industry, the family relocated to Bangkok. From then on, she started doing photo shoots and appeared in music videos for Mr.D and C-Quint.

== Acting career ==
=== 2008–2015: Debut and breakthrough ===
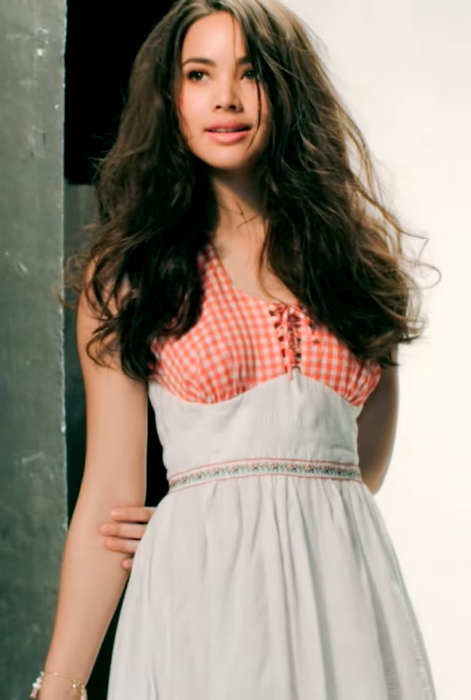
Urassaya posing for Cleo Thailand in 2015

Urassaya made her television debut in 2008 by a co-starring role in the Channel 3 sitcom Peun See Long Hon. In 2010, she starred opposite Chermarn Boonyasak and Atshar Nampan in Kularb Rai Narm. The same year, she starred in Duang Jai Akkanee, based on the 2009 novel of the same name by Sorn Klin. The drama was incredibly popular in Thailand, and earned her the Top Awards and Siamdara Stars Awards for Best Rising Star. In 2011, she auditioned for the lead role in Tawan Dueat, directed by Atthaporn Teemakorn, with Prin Suparat as her co-star. At the 3rd Nataraja Award, she was nominated for Best Actress, but lost to Araya A. Hargate for Dok Som See Thong.

Following Tawan Duead, Urassaya had more success starring opposite Nadech Kugimiya in Game Rai Game Rak (2011), which gained her a TV Gold Award nomination. Urassaya also lent her voice for the animation Superhero Lo Chuai Dai (2012). That same year, she played Darunee in Torranee Ni Nee Krai Krong, based on the 1974 novel of the same name by Nongchanai Prinyathawat. In 2013, she starred as Mattana in the Channel 3 series Sam Thahan Suea Sao (Maya Tawan), following which she took on another romantic role in Yutthana Leopanpaiboon's Nueng Nai Suang (2015), co-starring Jirayu Tangsrisuk.

=== 2016–present: Subsequent work and success ===
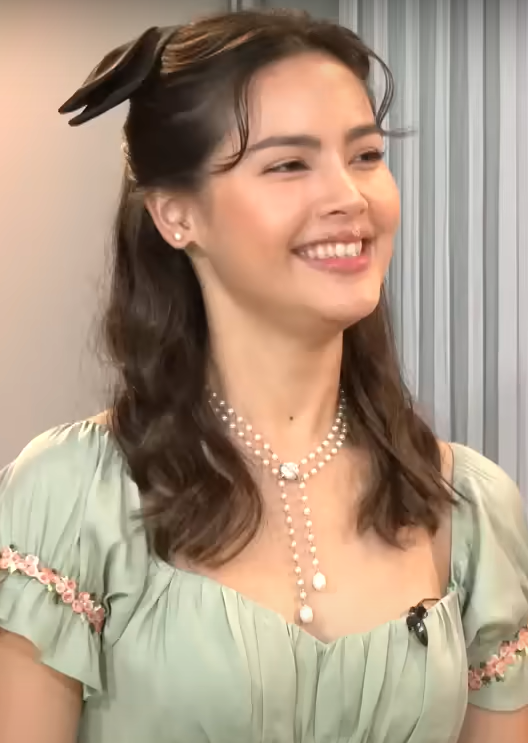
Urassaya promoting My Cherie Amour in 2024

After a two-year absence from the screen, Urassaya next reunited with Prin Suparat in Khluen Chiwit (2017), a romantic drama from Ampaiporn Jitmaingong. At the 32nd TV Gold Awards, she won for Best Actress for her performance. In 2018, Urassaya appeared in two films. The first of these was opposite Sunny Suwanmethanont and Nichkhun in the romantic-comedy Brother of the Year. The film was a critical and commercial success, and Urassaya's performance received critical acclaim. A reviewer writing for the Boom Channel called her performance "attention-grabbing". She received her first Suphannahong National Film Awards and nominations for a Bangkok Critics Assembly Awards and a Starpics Thai Film Awards for Best Actress. Her next role came in the fantasy thriller Nakee 2, with co-stars Natapohn Tameeruks, Phupoom Pongpanu and Nadech Kugimiya. Despite mixed reviews, the film was a commercial success and was the tenth highest-grossing film of all time in Thailand. Also that year, she played Princess Alice in the romantic action television The Crown Princess. In February 2018, she was the first Thai actress who received the title of "Friend of Louis Vuitton" and became the first ever Thai celebrity featured in Vogue.

Urassaya next took the lead role in San Sikaewlor's drama Klin Kasalong (2019), for which she received numerous accolades for her performance, including nominations for a Kom Chad Luek, a Nataraja, and a TV Gold Award for Best Actress. In 2022, Urassaya starred in Nawapol Thamrongrattanarit's comedy Fast and Feel Love, released on April 6, 2022. Her performance was praised by critics, with some hailing it as the best of her career. That same year, she co-starred in the Netflix series Thai Cave Rescue, which chronicles the 2018 Tham Luang cave rescue of a Thai boys' soccer team that was trapped 2.5 miles inside the cave for eighteen days as a result of a flash-flood.

She was part of the 2026 LVMH Prize jury as a special guest.

== Personal life ==
Urassaya met Thai actor Nadech Kugimiya while filming Duang Jai Akkanee in 2010. Their relationship was reported in the media with various speculations, but the pair refused to speak publicly about it. In a November 2022 interview with The Standard Pop, Urassaya said, "Actually, we've never asked each other to be boyfriend and girlfriend. We were like, ‘When should we count as our day one?’ And I think it was during the filming of Torranee Ni Nee Krai Krong." They became engaged in June 2023. The couple got married on April 17, 2026, just a few days after Songkran, in Khon Kaen, Nadech's hometown, with a traditional Isan-themed wedding.

== Filmography ==
=== Film ===
Year	Title	Role	Notes	Ref.
2018	Brother of the Year	Jane		
2018	Nakee 2	Sroy		
2021	Raya and the Last Dragon	Raya	Thai dubbing	
2021	Undefeated	Vee	Short film for Free Fire Thailand	
2022	Luna	Luna	Short film for Free Fire Thailand	
2022	Fast and Feel Love	Jay		
2024	Love You to Debt	Im		
2025	Home Sweet Home Rebirth	Prang		

=== Television ===
Year	Title	Role	Notes	Ref.
2008	Peun See Long Hon	Som		
2010	Kularb Rai Narm	Nucharee		
2010	Duang Jai Akkanee	Ajjima / Jeed		
2010	Wayupak Montra	Ajjima / Jeed		
2011	Tawan Dueat	Phet Roong		
2011	Game Rai Game Rak	Nang Fah / Fahlada		
2012	Torranee Ni Nee Krai Krong	Darunee		
2012	Superhero Lo Chuai Dai	Herself	Voice role; Cameo	
2013	Maya Tawan	Mattana		
2013	Mon Jun Tra	Mattana		
2013	Fah Krajang Dao	Mattana		
2013	Dao Raung	Dao Raung		
2013	Superhero Suay Chuai Dai	Herself	Voice role	
2014	Roy Ruk Hak Liam Tawan	Mayumi Takahashi		
2014	Roy Fun Tawan Duerd	Mayumi Takahashi		
2015	Nueng Nai Suang	Hatairach / Poom		
2017	Khluen Chiwit	Jeerawat		
2017	Leh Lub Salub Rarng	Petra Pawadee		
2018	The Crown Princess	Princess Alice Madeleine Theresa Phillips		
2019	Klin Kasalong	Kasalong / Songpeep / Pimpisa / Pimmada		
2022	Bad Romeo	Saikim		
2022	Thai Cave Rescue	Kelly		
2022	The Kinnaree Conspiracy	Mae Ying Pudsorn		
2024	Jon Kwa Ja Dai Ruk Gun	Apo		
2024	My Cherie Amour	Anong		
2025	Chuang Asia: Season 2	Mentor		
2025	Dalah: Death and the Flowers	Dalah		
2026	Tawan Luang	Alisa		

=== Music video appearances ===
Year	Title	Artist	Ref.
2007	"Dek Lang Hong" (เด็กหลังห้อง)	Mr. D	
2007	"Hoon Mai Hai Tae Jai Rak" (หุ่นไม่ให้แต่ใจรัก)	Mr. D	
2008	"Tor Hai Lok Yut Mun" (ต่อให้โลกหยุดหมุน)	C-Quint	
2012	"My Bad Habit"	Chinawut Indracusin	
2013	"Yak Bok Rak" (อยากบอกรัก)	Urassaya, The Richman Toy, Harin Suthamjarus and Saruyot Khongmee	
2014	"Laew Rao Ja Dai Rak Gan Mai" (แล้วเราจะได้รักกันไหม)	Urassaya and Nadech Kugimiya	
2015	"Joop" (จูบ)	Urassaya and Jirayu Tangsrisuk	
2015	"Pan Chakkra Yan" (ปั่นจักรยาน)	Saharat Sangkapreecha, Burin Boonvisut, Peerapat Tenwong and Artiwara Kongmalai	
2016	"Happy Birthday Channel 3"	Urassaya and Nadech Kugimiya	
2016	"Set Laew Tob" (เซตแล้วตบ)	Urassaya, Rasri Balenciaga Chirathiwat, Kimberley Anne Woltemas, Ranee Campen, Nittha Jirayungyurn and Ranida Techasit	
2017	"Make it happen"	Urassaya and Daboyway	
2018	"Hot Girls"	Lydia Sarunrat Deane and F.Hero	
2018	"Rak Nong Khon Diao" (รักน้องคนเดียวววว)	UrboyTJ, Sunny Suwanmethanont and Nichkhun	
2018	"Ya Pung Thot Jai" (อย่าเพิ่งถอดใจ)	Narongwit Techathanawat, Banana boat, Panudej Thepbuakaew and Somkiat Matharparit	
2019	"Touch Thi Dee Tor Jai" (ทัชที่ดีต่อใจ)	Urassaya and Klear	
2020	"Hang Phuea Rak Thoe" (ห่างเพื่อรักเธอ)	Singto Numchok	
2020	"Rak Na Guard Ya Tok" (รักนะการ์ดอย่าตก)	Urassaya, Jarinporn Joonkiat and Kornpop Chancharoen	
2022	"Everything is All You" (ทุกอย่างที่เป็นเธอ)	Popetorn Sunthornyanakit	
2026	"Game Changer" (เสน่ห์ผมมันแรง)	Urassaya and Pixxie	

== Discography ==
Year	Title	Notes	Ref.
2011	"Nalika Tai" (นาฬิกาตาย)	from Tawan Deard OST	
2012	"Summer Nee Tong Me Lay's" (ซัมเมอร์นี้ต้องมีเลย์) (with Nadech Kugimiya)	—N/a	
2012	"Ah Karn Rak" (อาการรัก)	from Torranee Ni Nee Krai Krong OST	
2012	"Plian" (เปลี่ยน)	—N/a	
2012	"Plian Ma Sanook Duay Gan" (เปลี่ยนมาสนุกด้วยกัน) (with Nadech Kugimiya)	—N/a	
2013	"Lay's Summer" (เลย์ซัมเมอร์) (with Nadech Kugimiya)	—N/a	
2013	"Rao Khao Tueng Jai" (เราเข้าถึงใจ)	—N/a	
2013	"Yak Bok Rak" (อยากบอกรัก) (with The Richman Toy, Harin Suthamjarus and Saruyot Khongmee)	—N/a	
2014	"Klai Naw" (ใครหนอ)	—N/a	
2014	"Laew Rao Ja Dai Rak Gan Mai" (แล้วเราจะได้รักกันไหม) (with Nadech Kugimiya)	The Rising Sun: The Original Soundtrack	
2015	"Joop" (จูบ) (with Jirayu Tangsrisuk)	from Neung Nai Suang OST	
2016	"Happy Birthday Channel 3" (with Nadech Kugimiya)	Channel 3 46th Anniversary	
2016	"Set Laew Tob" (เซตแล้วตบ) (with Rasri Balenciaga Chirathiwat, Kimberley Anne Woltemas, Ranee Campen, Nittha Jirayungyurn and Ranida Techasit)	Channel 3 promotional anthem for the 2016 FIVB Volleyball World Grand Prix Week 6	
2017	"Make It Happen" (with Daboyway)	—N/a	
2019	"Touch Thi Dee Tor Jai" (ทัชที่ดีต่อใจ) (with Klear)	—N/a	
2020	"Rak Na Guard Ya Tok" (รักนะการ์ดอย่าตก) (with Jarinporn Joonkiat and Kornpop Chancharoen)	—N/a	
2022	"Moonlight Memories"	from Luna OST	
2024	"Bok Thi Wa Thoe Ko Ru Suek" (บอกทีว่าเธอก็รู้สึก) (with Prin Suparat)	from Jon Kwa Ja Dai Ruk Gun OST	
2026	"Game Changer" (เสน่ห์ผมมันแรง) (with Pixxie)	—N/a	

== Concerts ==
Co-headlining

- 13th Kid Teung Mae (2010)
- Sam Thahan Suea Sao Limited Edition Live Show (2013)
- Love is in the Air: Channel 3 Charity Concert (2017)

Supporting

- Thongchai McIntyre – Bird Arsa Sanook (2011)
- Channel 3 4+1 Superstar Concert (2012)
- The Impression Concert (2012)
- Give Me 5: Concert Rate A (2014)
- Thaitanium – Thaitanium Unbreakable Concert (2018)
- Nadech Kugimiya – The Real Nadech Concert (2019)
- Palitchoke Ayanaputra – Peck Palitchoke 15th Anniversary The Final Odyssey Concert (2020)
- Jeff Satur – Jeff Satur Red Giant Concert (2025)
- Pixxie – Pixxie Tales Concert : The Enchanted Ceremony (2026)

== Accolades ==
Urassaya has been nominated for numerous awards throughout her career. She was nominated for nine Nataraja Awards and six TV Gold Awards. She has won a Siamdara Stars Award, a Suphannahong National Film Award, and a Thai Film Director Award for Best Actress for Brother of the Year. She also received Rising Star Asia Award in New York Asian Film Festival.
