= Thara Himalaya =

Thai television soap opera

- Also known as: Thara's Himalaya
- ธาราหิมาลัย
- Written by: Nathariya Sirakornvilai
- Directed by: Krit Sukramongkol
- Starring: Atichart Chumnanon; Kimberly Ann Voltemas
- Opening theme: Hai Rak Dern Tang Ma Jer Gun by Da Endorphine
- Ending theme: Kwarm Rak Plien Plang Chun by Narongvit Techathanavat
- Country of origin: Thailand
- Original language: Thai
- No. of episodes: 9

Production
- Producer: Maker Y Group
- Production location: Thailand
- Running time: Friday - Sunday

Original release
- Network: Channel 3
- Release: 16 October – 5 November 2010

Related
- Duang Jai Akkanee

Thara Himalaya (Thai: ธาราหิมาลัย; RTGS: Thara Himalai) is a 2010 Thai lakorn 1 in a 4 drama series. It is called 4 Huajai Haeng Koon Kao (Thai: 4 หัวใจแห่งขุนเขา) or 4 Hearts of the Mountains which aired on Channel 3. It starred Atichart Chumnanon and Kimberly Ann Voltemas. 4 Huajai Haeng Koon Kao was a special lakorn as it celebrated Channel 3's 40th Anniversary.

== Synopsis ==
The story started when Thiptara or Nam (Kimberly Ann Voltemas) the youngest of the 4 quadruplets of the Adisuan family, met and fell in love with Puwanes (Atichart Chumnanon) the crown prince of the country called Parawat, who Nam believes is a simple worker on his brother Fai's (Nadech Kugimiya) farm.

When Prince Puwanes visits Thailand, he is victim to an assassination attempt organised by the Prime Minister Shadul (Noppon Gomarachun). He is badly injured and gets sent to the hospital where Nam is his attending doctor. During his recovery, Puwanes has to pretend that he lost his memory in order to protect his identity and safety. Nam nicknames him 'Pupen' meaning crab, since he apparently cannot remember his real identity.

== Cast ==
=== Main cast ===
- Atichart Chumnanon (Aum) as Prince Puwanes Vasuthep Srivasatava Rajaput/Pupen
- Kimberly Ann Voltemas (Kim) as Thiptara "Nam" Adisuan
- Nadech Kugimiya (Barry) as Akkanee "Fai" Adisuan
- Prin Suparat (Mark) as Pathapee "Din" Adisuan
- Pakorn Chatborirak (Boy) as Wayupak "Lom" Adisuan

=== Supporting cast ===
- Soravit Suboon (Kong) as Dr. Nat
- Maneerat Kumoun (Ae) as Preeyanuch "Pam"
- Mavin Taveepol as Rajeev
- Adisorn Athakrit (Tao) as Varun
- Noppon Gomarachun (Too) as Prime Minister Shadul
- Kriengkrai Oonhanun as King Vasuthep
- Thitima Sanghapitak (Mam) as Queen
- Thongkao Pattarachokchai
- Santisuk Promsiri as Montree Adisuan
- Jintara Sukapat as Supansa Adisuan

=== Special appearances ===
- Urassaya Sperbund as Jeed

== Awards ==
Television
Year	Award	Category	Actor/Actress	Result
2010	Top Awards	Best Lakorn	None	Nominated
2010	Top Awards	Best Actor in a Lakorn	Atichart Chumnanon	Nominated
2010	Top Awards	Best New Rising Female Actress	Kimberly Ann Voltemas	Nominated
