= Khluen Chiwit =

- Also known as: Life's Waves; Waves of Life; Kluen Cheewit
- คลื่นชีวิต
- Genre: Drama; Romance; Revenge
- Based on: คลื่นชีวิต by Krung Ya Chat
- Directed by: Aew Ampaiporn Jitmaingong
- Starring: Urassaya Sperbund; Prin Suparat; Louis Scott; Jarinporn Joonkiat
- Opening theme: Ying Ham Ying Wanwai by Zeal
- Ending theme: Ya Bok Wa by Warn Wunwarn
- Country of origin: Thailand
- Original language: Thai
- No. of episodes: 15

Production
- Producer: Da Hathairat Aumatawanich
- Running time: 1 hr 50 min

Original release
- Network: Channel 3
- Release: January 23 – March 13, 2017

Kluen Cheewit (Thai: คลื่นชีวิต, lit. "Life's Waves" or "Waves of Life", also spelled Kluen Cheevit) is a 2017 Thai drama that stars Prin Suparat, Urassaya Sperbund, Louis Scott, and Jarinporn Joonkiat. It aired on Channel 3 from January 23, 2017, to March 13, 2017 (Monday and Tuesday). The drama is based on a novel with the same title and also a remake version of Khluen Chiwit (1995). This is the second collaboration between Prin Suparat and Urassaya Sperbund, after 6 years, who previously worked together in the lakorn entitled Tawan Deard.

== Synopsis ==
Jeerawat (Urassaya Sperbund) is a famous model and actress. On the surface, Jeerawat has a perfect life but deep down, she is in danger of being raped by her stepfather and longs for her mother's love. After Jeewarat's rich and powerful stepfather drugs Jeerawat, she manages to escape by driving away. Unfortunately, she hits a young woman on the road, who later dies at the hospital.

The dead young woman has a fiancée, Sathit (Prin Suparat), who is a lawyer who believes strongly in justice. He vows revenge on the female driver who killed his beloved fiancée. Unfortunately, Jeerawat's stepfather and mother use their influence and money to hide and hush all evidence. After coincidentally running into each other on many occasions, their fated encounters starts to change them both, as their bond deepens, Sathit becomes conflicted between the evidence that Jeerawat was involved in the car accident and between the good and kind person he finds underneath her public appearance, who risks her life for him. What will Sathit do when he gradually falls in love with Jeewarat?

== Casts ==
Main Casts

- Prin Suparat as Sathit Wadcharaporn / Thit (Lawyer)
- Urassaya Sperbund as Jeerawat Suriyarat / Jee (Miss G) (Thai female TV actress)
- Louis Scott as Chaiyan Disathaporn (Piak's Husband)
- Jarinporn Joonkiat as Piyakul Disathaporn or Piak (Chaiyan's Wife)
- Masu Junyangdikul as Jade Wadcharapan (Janejira's elder brother/Completion Engineer PETROL THAI OIL GROUP)
- Nuttanicha Dungwattanawanich as Daraka Pirunworakul / Dao (Jeerawat's Friend)
- Nalinthip Sakulongumpai as Janejira Wadcharapan (Jade's younger sister/Dao junior/Lawyer)
- Chotika Wongwilas as Pim (Thai female TV actress)

Supporting Casts

- Sriphan Chunechomboon as Looknam (Pim Personal Manager)
- Eckhai Ueasangkhomserot as Suki (Jeerawat Personal Manager)
- Santisuk Promsiri (Noom) as Patna (Piyakul (Piak) Father)
- Kik Mayurin Pongpudpunth as Kun-Ying Jariya Maitreesawad (Jeerawat Mother)
- Teerapong Leowrakwong as Sitta Maitreesawad (Philanthropist Businessman)
- Anant Boonnark as Kroo Ar-Ree (Former primary school teacher in Jeerawat childhood)
- Khwanruedi Klomklom as Nawadee Banbordee (Kroo Tiwwadee Mother)
- Prima Ratchata as Siriluk (Servant of the Sittha House)

Guest role

- Mai Warit Sirisantana as Mai / Rut (Thai male television actor) (Ep.1,4)
- Prim Prima Bhunjaroeun as Tiwwadee Banbordee or Kroo Tiew (Sathit Ex-girlfriend) (Ep.1,2,3,4,6,8)
- Surint Karawoot (Woot) as Phan Tamruat Tri Pised (Sathit Friend) (Ep.1,2,3,9,10,11,12,13,14)
- Tassawan Seneewongse Na Ayutthaya as Penjan Santid (Yai Jan) (Thepan's grandmother) (Ep.4,5,6,7,9)
- Freudonidas (Freud) Natthapong Chartpong as Thepan (Pan) (Grandson of Grandma Penchan) (Ep.4,5,6,7,9,10)
- Gale Warunlak Sirimaneewattana as Rada (Piyakul (Piak) Friend/Thai female TV actress) (Ep.3)
- Piya Sawetpikul as Pee Ka (Owner of a charity walk) (Ep.1)
- Tum Rossarin Jantra as Joung-Jan Wadcharapan (Jade and Janejira Mother/private school owner) (Ep.2,5)
- Jack Chakapan as Wetid (Way) (Sathit Friend) (Ep.7,8,9)
- Napat Chumjitri (King Konbai) as Stephan (Private chauffeur Jeerawat) (Ep.1,2)
- as Nukoon (Sathit Friend/Lawyer) (Ep.1)
- Kittiphon Ketmanee (Ep.2)
- Jirada moran as Jeerawat (chird) (Ep.4)

Performer

- Siwakorn Wiroaddun () as Guests at the fashion show (Ep.1)
- Kittipong Sanjorn () as Employees of P Production Company (Ep.1)
- Wirawut Kemkhang () as Sitta Henchman (Ep.1)
- Suttipong Payaksan () as Sitta Henchman (Ep.1)
- Vita Deeplangploy () as a guest at a charity event (Ep.1)
- Leosak Teerarangkoon () as Tiewwadee Banbordee (Kroo Tiew) guests in black and white (Ep.1)
- Jutharat Jinrat () as Tiewwadee Banbordee (Kroo Tiew) guests in black and white (Ep.1)
- Malee Thaworn () as Tiewwadee Banbordee (Kroo Tiew) guests in black and white (Ep.1)
- Chalesoun Hanchana () as Priest (Ep.1)
- () as Sutee (private driver Jeerawat) (Ep.1,2,7)
- () as Jack (Children in Ban Nawadee) (Ep.2,3,4,6,14)
- () as Mong (Children in Ban Nawadee) (Ep.2,3,4,6,14)
- Pairoad Naiplay () as Villagers (Ep.2)
- Jidtrakorn Pinprathanporn () as Kun Nai (Ep.2)
- () as Nang Am (Patana house servant) (Ep.2)
- Pongsit Phisitthakan () as Sorawit (Wit) (Sathit Company Employees) (Ep.2,4,10,14)
- () as Thantawam (Tawan) (Sathit Company Employees) (Ep.2,3,4,10,11,12,)
- Kridtapad Jantanapoti () as Padtana Cotton Lawyer (Ep.2)
- Thanat Chadchawan () as Judge (Ep.2)
- Chadcharid Wanidphoonphon () as Sitta Company Director (Ep.3)
- Suntree Chodtipan () as Sitta Company Director (Ep.3)
- Supaporn Soipanich () as Judge (Ep.3)
- Nat Khaoyuan-Phueng () as Guests in b branny (Ep.3)
- Kanyapha Wayupad () as Guests in b branny (Ep.3)
- Ra-cha-ta Singchan () as Guests in b branny (Ep.3)
- Channatan Tiankittipong () as Villagers in the market (Ep.4)
- Ngan-Piece Sakuntala () as Villagers (Ep.4)
- Panyakorn Sornmayura () as Kun Nai Cotton Lawyer (Ep.4)
- Janejara Suwannai () as Kun Nai (Ep.4)
- Opad Sudtipien () as Kun Nai ex-husband (Ep.4)
- Honey Saeng Saeng () as Foolish wife was hired by Mrs. (Ep.4)
- Jirasak Neinramnong () as Sia Meng Henchman (Ep.5)
- Tanakrid Kanha () as Sia Meng Henchman (Ep.5)
- Poramed Samad () as Sia Meng Henchman (Ep.5)
- Krid Pudtarangsee () as Private bank security guards (Ep.5)
- () as Sia Meng (community landowners) (Ep.5)
- Yodchai Padchanee () as Kokiet (Ar Piyakul (Piak)/TV station owner) (Ep.5)
- Punyalak Supatammarat () as Public Relations Officer, Star Gossip Publishing Company Limited (Ep.5)
- () as Editor of the Star Gossip Publishing House (Ep.5)
- Daranphom Suriyawong () as Sitta Henchman (Ep.7,13)
- Jutamanee Chaimongkhon () as Thai female TV actress (Ep.7,8)
- Aphidet Duanyai (Bank Tongtung) as Sitta Henchman (Ep.9)
- Ammata Banteingtheb () as truck driver (Ep.9)
- Pansakuna Longjareinglab () as Village aunt at Kamphaeng Phet (Ep.9)
- Peeradet Ruengsamran () as The detective was hired by Piyakul (Piak) (Ep.9)
- Badin Moo-Muen-Sri () as Priest (Ep.10)
- Supachok TaweeChok () as Sitta Henchman (Ep.10,11)
- Jatuded Kasemlawan () as Royal Thai Police (Ep.10)
- Nirut Sudjarid () as Guests at a party with a model (Ep.10)
- Tammanoon Jara () as Guests at a party with a model (Ep.10)
- Waipod Krouysawad () as Royal Thai Police (Ep.10)
- Chalee Cheuo-Yai () as Priest (Ep.12)
- Ektawan Kumchad () as Physician (Ep.12)
- () as Aongart Meethong (Procurement Engineer, Sittha Construction Co., Ltd.) (Ep.13)
- Benjamalak ThibKhanthong () as short news anchor (Ep.13)
- Choochad Radomphon () as Royal Thai Police (Ep.13)
- Kanungnuch Chudonwai () as Journalist (Ep.15)
- Chatwat Rattanawong () as Thai male television actor (Ep.15)
- () as Aem (Suwit Husband) (Ep.15)

== Ratings ==
In the table below, the blue number represent the lowest ratings and the red number represent the highest ratings.

Episode	Original broadcast date	Average audience share
Episode	Original broadcast date	AGB Nielsen
1	January 23, 2017	5.52%
2	January 24, 2017	5.39%
3	January 30, 2017	5.08%
4	January 31, 2017	5.50%
5	February 6, 2017	5.00%
6	February 7, 2017	5.34%
7	February 13, 2017	5.65%
8	February 14, 2017	5.50%
9	February 20, 2017	6.05%
10	February 21, 2017	6.51%
11	February 27, 2017	6.84%
12	February 28, 2017	5.36%
13	March 6, 2017	6.95%
14	March 7, 2017	7.22%
15	March 13, 2017	7.82%
Average		5.98%

== Reception ==
The drama was a major hit and received popularity in Thailand. It is considered to be the highest rated Lakorn of Channel 3 in 2017. Khluen Chiwit is one of the Thai dramas that became phenomenal in recent years in China. It tops the list of most-watched on Bilibili, and other popular video streaming websites in China. At that time of airing, the drama episodes were also top trending in social media sites like in Google and Twitter. Additionally, the drama received praise from the fans in China, Russia, Vietnam, Indonesia, Malaysia, and Arab Countries.

Furthermore, the drama received positive reviews from critics. Critics Thairath praised the director's ability to pull out the potential of the characters. Thairath also states that "Both Prin Suparat and Urassaya Sperbund portrayed their love and sweetness very well. Another, Nuttanicha Dungwattanawanich, Masu Junyangdikul, and Louis Scott are the characters that make the drama even more mesmerizing."

According to Post Today, they applauded the brilliant chemistry and romance between Prin Suparat and Urassaya Sperbund.

After the airing of the drama, Thai Netizens wanted Prin Suparat and Urassaya Sperbund to see and work together again in a new Lakorn.

== Awards and nominations ==
Year	Award	Category	Nominated work	Result
2017	Maya Award 2017	Most Popular Drama	Khluen Chiwit	Nominated
2017	Maya Award 2017	Best Director	Aew Ampaiporn Jitmaingong	Nominated
2017	Maya Award 2017	Best Actor	Prin Suparat	Nominated
2017	Maya Award 2017	Best Actress	Urassaya Sperbund	Nominated
2017	Maya Award 2017	Best Supporting Actor	Louis Scott	Nominated
2017	Maya Award 2017	Best Supporting Actress	Toey Jarinporn Joonkiat	Nominated
2017	Maya Award 2017	Best Song	Ying Ham Ying Wanwai by Zeal	Nominated
2017	Star Indy Award (DaraInside)	Best Actress of The Year	Urassaya Sperbund	Won
2017	Star Indy Award (DaraInside)	Best Supporting Actor	Eckhai Ueasangkhomserot	Won
2017	Star Indy Award (DaraInside)	Best Drama of the Year	Khluen Chiwit	Won
2017	Sanook! สุดยอด Vote of the year 2017	Best Actress	Urassaya Sperbund	Won
2017	Sanook! สุดยอด Vote of the year 2017	Best Drama	Khluen Chiwit	Won
2018	Howe Award 2017	Best Actor	Prin Suparat	Won
2018	Thai Top Talk-About 2018	Top Talk-About TV Drama	Khluen Chiwit	Won
2018	Thai Top Talk-About 2018	Top Talk-About Actor	Prin Suparat	Won
2018	Thai Top Talk-About 2018	Best Supporting Actress	Toey Jarinporn Joonkiat	Nominated
2018	32nd TV Gold Awards	Best Actress	Urassaya Sperbund	Won
2018	Nine Entertain Awards 2018	Best Drama	Khluen Chiwit	Nominated
2018	Nine Entertain Awards 2018	Best Actor	Prin Suparat	Nominated
2018	Nine Entertain Awards 2018	Best Actress	Urassaya Sperbund	Nominated
2018	Siamdara Stars Awards 2018	Best Drama	Khluen Chiwit	Nominated
2018	Siamdara Stars Awards 2018	Best Director	Aew Ampaiporn Jitmaingong	Nominated
2018	Siamdara Stars Awards 2018	Best Actor	Prin Suparat	Nominated
2018	Siamdara Stars Awards 2018	Best Actress	Urassaya Sperbund	Nominated
2018	9th Nataraj Awards 2018	Best Drama	Khluen Chiwit	Nominated
2018	9th Nataraj Awards 2018	Best Actor	Prin Suparat	Nominated
2018	9th Nataraj Awards 2018	Best Supporting Actor	Louis Scott	Nominated
2018	9th Nataraj Awards 2018	Best Supporting Actress	Toey Jarinporn Joonkiat	Nominated
2018	9th Nataraj Awards 2018	Best Song	Ying Ham Ying Wanwai by Zeal	Nominated

== Related Productions ==
=== 1983 television series ===
In 1983, the first adaptation of Krung Ya Chat's novel was released under the title คลื่นเสน่หา (Khluen Saneha). The series was directed by Suprawat Pattamasoot and produced by Mayurachat Muenpasitiwet. It aired on Channel 3 every Monday to Sunday at 8:50 PM.

In this adaptation, the names of some characters were changed from the original novel for certain reasons such as Jeerawat became Kaewkarn.

Main Casts

- Mayura Tanabut as Kaewkarn (Jeerawat in other adaptations)
- Noppol Gomarachun as Sathit
- Sompob Benjathinkul as Akara (Chaiyan in other adaptations)
- Mayurachat Muenpasitiwet as Nattaya (Piyakul in other adaptations)
- Anusorn Dechapanya as Khatha (Jade in other adaptations)
- Duentem Salitul as Daraka
- Nattakarn Sethabutr as Janejira

Supporting Casts

- Piathip Kumwong as Kalaya (Jariya in other adaptations)
- Uthumporn Silaphan as Cherdchatchom (Pim in 2017 adaptation)
- Kamthorn Suwanpiyasiri as Saksit (Sitta in other adaptation)

Guest Roles

- Duangjai Hathaikarn as Tiwwadee

=== 1995 television series ===
In 1995, the television series based on Krung Ya Chat's novel was released under the original novel name คลื่นชีวิต (Khluen Chiwit). The series was directed by Suprawat Pattamasoot, produced by Hathairat Amatawanit and screenplay by Yingyot Panya. It aired on Channel 3 every Wednesday to Thursday from 8:30 PM to 9:30 PM.

Main Casts

- Jariya Saranakom as Jeerawat / Jee
- Johnny Anfone as Sathit / Thit
- Sathaporn Nakwilai as Chaiyan
- Kanta Danao as Piyakul / Piak
- Bordin Duke as Jade
- Penpisut Kongsamut as Daraka
- Pawimol Suwannapho as Janejira

Supporting Casts

- Duentem Salitul as Khun-Ying Jariya
- Suchao Pongwilai as Sitta
- Praima Ratchata as Cherdchatchom (Pim in 2017 adaptation)
