= Prin Suparat =

Thai actor and model (born 1990)

Alvin Prin Suparat
- ปริญ สุภารัตน์
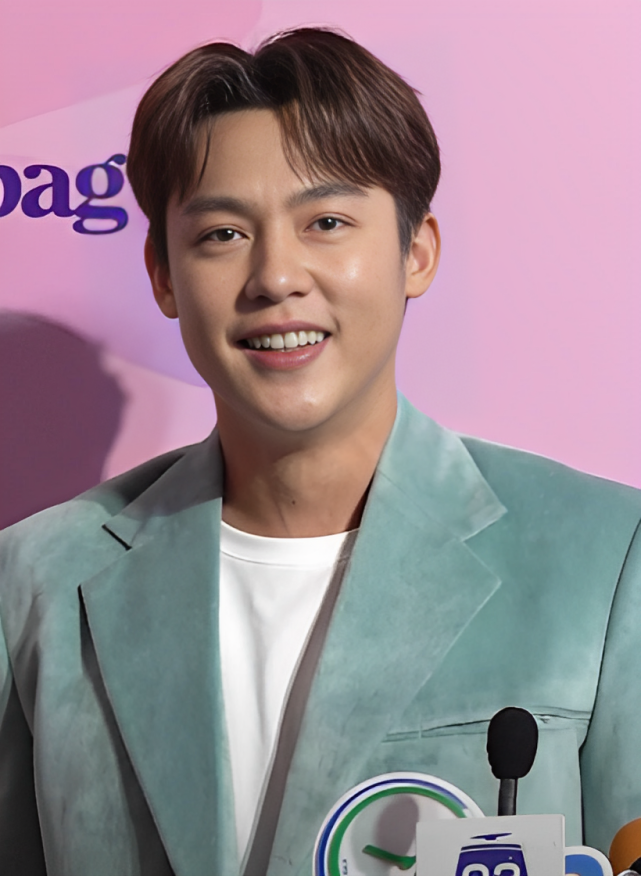
- Mark Prin in February 2023
- Born: Prin Suparat; 19 March 1990 (age 36); Chiang Mai, Thailand
- Other name: Mark Prin
- Education: Rangsit University; Prince Royal's College
- Occupations: Actor; MC; YouTuber
- Years active: 2010–present
- Agent: Channel 3 (2009–present)
- Spouse: Kimberley Anne Woltemas (m. 2023)

Prin Suparat (Thai: ปริญ สุภารัตน์, RTGS: Prin Supharat; born 19 March 1990), known internationally as Mark Prin, is a Thai actor. He is seen on Channel 3. He is a member of the group called 4+1 Channel 3 Superstar with Mario Maurer, Nadech Kugimiya, Pakorn Chatborirak, and Phupoom Pongpanu. He is also well known for his roles in Punya Chon Kon Krua (2012), Pope Rak (2014), Rak Nakara (2017), Kleun Cheewit (2017), My Husband in Law (2020), and My Forever Sunshine (2020).

== Personal life ==
=== Early life and career beginnings ===
Prin Suparat was born in Chiang Mai to Thai Chinese parents. He grew up in Lampang. His entrance and debut break into the Entertainment/Acting field begun after he was scouted by a manager working for Channel 3.

=== Education ===
He attended the Faculty of Tourism and Hospitality at Rangsit University on an athletic scholarship. His talent is Judo, in which he is a black belt (middleweight), and he was on the Judo team for Rangsit University.

=== Marriage ===
On April 17, 2022, Mark Prin and his girlfriend of nine years, Kimberley Anne Woltemas, got engaged. They held a simple engagement ceremony in Lanna style with only family members of the two and close friends along with a housewarming ceremony together on August 26, 2023. The couple tied the knot on September 14, 2023 at Villa Bonomi, Lake Como, Italy.

== Business ==
On June 25, 2026, Nadech Kugimiya, Prin, and Attaphol Phohanrattanakul jointly registered the establishment of OKOK Production Co., Ltd., a agency and production house, with a registered capital of 1 million THB.

== Filmography ==
=== Films ===
Year	Title	Role	Notes	With
2014	The Order	Ake	Main Role	Chermarn Boonyasak
2019	Necromancer	Win	Main Role	Chicha Amatayakul
2021	Haunted Tales (part "The Book of Truth")	Jess	Main Role	None
2025	Ziam	Singh	Main Role	

=== Television dramas ===
Year	Title	Role	Network
2010	Ngao Ruk Luang Jai	Techit	Channel 3
2010	Thara Himalaya	Pathapee Adisuan (Din)	Channel 3
2010	Duang Jai Akkanee	Pathapee Adisuan (Din)	Channel 3
2010	Pathapee Leh Ruk	Pathapee Adisuan (Din)	Channel 3
2010	Wayupak Montra	Pathapee Adisuan (Din)	Channel 3
2011	Tawan Deard	Tawan / Seur	Channel 3
2011	Sarm Noom Nuer Tong	Kritchai	Channel 3
2012	Panyachon Kon Krua	Waraet / Tam	Channel 3
2012	Nuer Mek 2	Saengkla Aphichai	Channel 3
2013	Khun Chai Ronapee	Himself (cameo)	Channel 3
2013	Ton Ruk Rim Rua	Kasidith Kietyotha / Kob	Channel 3
2014	Pope Rak	Yieow	Channel 3
2015	Ab Ruk Online	Pranont / "Non"	Channel 3
2016	Buang Athithan	Krittathorn / Crown Prince Ariya	Channel 3
2017	Kleun Cheewit	Sathit Wadcharaporn (Thit)	Channel 3
2017	Rak Nakara	His Royal Highness Prince Suk Vong / Jao Noi Sukkawaong	Channel 3
2018	Kom Faek	Gun Kriengkrai	Channel 3
2019	Ruk Jung Aoey	Mark (cameo)	Channel 3
2020	My Husband in Law	Thierawat Navanawakul (Thian)	Channel 3
2020	My Forever Sunshine	Arthit Suriyakkun (Thit)	Channel 3
2021	Game of Outlaws / Game Lah Torrachon	Nont	Channel 3
2023	Eclipse of the Heart / Tai Ngao Tawan	Korn Chein-Isarachai	Channel 3
2024	Love at first night	Mueng Prakarn	Channel 3
2026	Plerng Phra Nang	Mueang Khum	Netflix

=== Music video appearances ===
Year	Song title	Artist
2017	"Time Bomb"	Greasy Cafe, with Nittha Jirayungyurn
2020	"Hua Jai Sung Hai Rak"	Praew Kanitkul, with Nittha Jirayungyurn

== Endorsements ==
=== Campaign ===
2011

- Net Design
- Tipco Orange Juice
- Tipco 100% with Ploy Chermarn Boonyasak
- Honda Brio
- Yah See Fun
- XACT Autume/Winter 2011 Collection

2012

- Oishi 2012 (Tour Japan)
- I-Mobile Sport Lifestyle
- Tipco Fruit Plus
- Honda Brio with Urassaya Sperbund
- I-Mobile I-Style Q2
- Fitne Tea with Toey Jarinporn

2013

- Vaseline for Men
- DoubelMint Bubble Gum
- 12Plus Colorista with Kim Tae-hee

2014

- CloseUp with Kimberly Ann Voltemas

2017

- Samsung Galaxy J7 with Peechaya Wattanamontree

2020

- Family Mart with Kimberly Ann Voltemas

2021

- The North Face Gucci with Davika Hoorne

== Discography ==
=== Soundtrack appearances ===
- "Rak Hai Roo" (Love to Know) – Sarm Noon Nuer Tong OST
- "Yoot Wela" (Stop Time) – Phope Ruk OST

== MC ==
Online

- 2021: Full EP.1 | Bookmark On Air YouTube: Landmark

== Awards ==
Years	Awards
2012	Siam Bunterng : Hottest Male of the Year 2012; Seesan Buteng Award : Fantasy Couple of the year w/ Kimberly Ann Voltemas
2013	Seesan Buteng Award : Fantasy Couple of the year w/ Kimberly Ann Voltemas; Kazz Award: Best Koo-jinn of the year
2015	Korean Culture & Entertainment awards: Popular Foreign Actor at Korea
2016	Daradaily The Great Awards 2015 : Cool Guy of the year; Kazz Award : Most Popular Male; Sudsupda Magazine : 10 Huggable Boys 2016
2017	Kazz Award 2017: Super Star Award
2018	Howe Award 2018: Best Actor Award : Kluen Cheewit; MThai Top Talk 2018: Best Actor Award : Kluen Cheewit
2020	Content Asia Awards 2020: Best Male Lead in a TV Program:My Husband in Law
