= The Kinnaree Conspiracy =

2022 Thai television series

- ลายกินรี
- Written by: Pongsakorn Jindhawattana
- Screenplay by: Parada Kantapattanakul; Yingyos Panya
- Directed by: Pongpat Wachirabunjong
- Starring: Nadech Kugimiya; Urassaya Sperbund; Sawika Chaiyadech; Chaiyapol Julien Poupart; Diana Flipo; Jirayu Tantrakul
- Country of origin: Thailand
- Original language: Thai
- No. of episodes: 16

Production
- Production company: Act Art Generation Company Limited

Original release
- Network: Channel 3 HD
- Release: October 24 – December 13, 2022

The Kinnaree Conspiracy or Lai Kinnaree (Thai: ลายกินรี) is a Thai drama series produced by Act Art Generation Co., Ltd., based on a novel by Dr. Pongsakorn Jindhawattana, which is the first novel out of 3 books in the Detective Lady of Sri Ayutthaya Series, starring Nadech Kugimiya, Urassaya Sperbund and Sawika Chaiyadech, directed by Pongpat Wachirabunjong. Broadcast on Channel 3 HD and streaming on television on Netflix. Its first episode aired on October 24, 2022.

The plot is a historical investigation during the end of the reign of King Narai the Great.

== Production ==
The show began fitting the actor's clothes in early September 2019 before a sacrifice ceremony on September 18 at Nong Khaem Studio. Later, Hem Phumiphathit Nittayarot, who plays Usman or Chiew, died on September 25 due to personal issues.

On October 21, the drama began filming. Initially, the scriptwriter was Parada Kantapatanakul before changing to Yingyos Panya, known for Krong Kam.

On September 20, 2021, the drama returned to filming before filming ended at Baan Suan Klinkaew, Pak Kret, Nonthaburi Province on April 3, 2022.

== Synopsis ==
The story of Og Luang Indrarajphakdi a young aristocrat of the Royal Police Department who has to work with Mor Pudson in an investigation find the killer in the murder of Captain Jean, a French naval captain. Monsieur Robert, the secretary of General Fobang, joined the investigation until a love triangle is born.

== Cast ==
=== Main ===
- Nadech Kugimiya (Barry) as Aok Luang (Viscount) Indra Ratchpakdee / Luang In (Son of Khunying Sare)
- Urassaya Sperbund (Yaya) as Mae Ying (Lady) Putsorn (The youngest daughter of Mor Mode, born to Mae Phikun and Doctor Mee's half-sister)
- Chaiyapol Julien Poupart (New) as Monsieur Robert (Secretary General Forbang)
- Jirayu Thantrakul (Got) as Jhun (Aunt Zhuang's son)
- Diana Flipo (Diana) as Madame Clara (Widow of Captain Jean, daughter of Luang (Viscount) Gocha-Ishak)
- David Asavanond (David) as Captain Jean (French naval captain, Madame Clara's husband.)
- Sawika Chaiyadech (Pinky) as Jao Jom (Kings Consort) Kinaree (Favorite lord in the reign of King Narai the Great)

=== Supporting ===
- Puttachart pongsuchart (Tui Tui) as Jeeb (A close friend of Dr. Phut Son)
- Natha Lloyd (Natha) as Mae Pikul (Dr. Putsorn's mother)
- Daraneenuch Pohpiti (Top) as Mae Heng (Dr. Mee's mother)
- Sirintra Niyakorn (Tra) as Juong (Jan's mother)
- Jariya Anfone (Nok) as Khun Ying (Marchioness or Ladyship) Sae (The mother of Ok Luang Intharatphakdi)
- Kanjanaporn Plodpai (Jeab) as Jao Jom (Kings Consort) Sarapee (Chao Chom in the palace in the previous reign She is the older sister of Mor Mode and the aunt of Mo Mee and Mo Pud Son.)
- Nattavat Kaewbuasai (Cake) as Aok Khun (Barron) Sanpinit (His right-hand subordinate, a close friend of Ok Luang In.)
- Wiragarn Seneetunti (Maprang) as Eang (Madam Clara's close maid)
- Prissana Klampinij (Poo) as Choi (Maid of Chao Chom Kinnaree)
- Sukhapat Lohwacharin (Suam, Puy) as Mee (The eldest son of Doctor Mode. born to Mae Heng and Half-older brother of Ying Putsorn)
- Sarut Vichitrananda (Big) as Aok Ya (Marquess) Yomaraj (Noble Chief of Police Department)
- Oliver Pupart (An) as Aok Ya (Marquess) Wichayen (Real name: Constantine Phaulkon) (A powerful and influential Greek nobleman at the royal court.)
- Athiwat Sanitwong Na Ayutthaya (Ton) as Aok Ya (Marquess) Thammathibbodee (Chao Jom Kinnaree's father)
- Thanayong Wongtrakul (Kradum) as Luang (Viscount) Gocha-Ishak (Madame Clara's father)
- Visarut Hiranbuth(Pai) as Aruh (In the novel is Hiran) (Son of Aurangyaprutra)
- Wongwachira Petchkeaw (Care) as Chiew (In Novel is Usaman) (Close friend of Kapitan Paul.)
- Thaweesak Alexander Thananan (Alex) as Captain Paul (A French naval captain who had a feud with Captain Jean.)
- Prakasit Bowsuwan (Pang) as Chiese Hok (Hok) (Owner of a tea house and a casino in a Chinese community)
- Danai Jarujinda (Kik) as Hong Sin Sae (Mhor Jeen) (Chinese doctor)
- Sira Patrat (Yai) as Chai (A close friend of China's Hok.)
- Gosin Ratchakrome (Go) as Khun (Baron) Chai ()
- Wasita Hermenau (Charlette) as Weena (In the novel is Ameena) (The girl that Dr. Phut Son redeemed herself to take care of her at home.)
- Chatchaya Samreingrat (Neen) as Lady Lukejan (Cousin of Dr. Phut Son)
- Ranchrawee Uakoolwarawat (Mint) as Lady Duangjan (Og Luang In's wife, who fell ill, passed away.)

=== Guest appearances ===
- Anuchit Sapunpohng (Oh) as Mhor (Dr.) Mhode (at a young age) (The father of Dr. Phut Son and Doctor Mee) (Ep.3,)
- Praptpadol Suwanbang (Prap) as Aok Rangkaya Putra (Aruh's father) (Ep.1,6,)
- Kaliya Niehus (Lita) as Aun (The wife of Mr. Chan who was raped and killed by Kapitan Jean.) (Ep.5)
- Phutharit Prombandal (Wit) as Aok Ya (Marquess) Phet Pi Chai () (Ep.)
- Nara Suttiyut (Manow) as Mae Ying (Lady) Pudsorn (young) (Ep.1,3,)

=== Actors who have been portrayed ===
- Jesdaporn Pholdee (Tik) as Aok Luang (Viscount) Indra Ratchpakdee / Luang In
- Bongkoj Khongmalai (Tak) as Jao Jom (Kings Consort) Kinaree
- Hemmawat Nittayaros (Hem) as Chiew (In Novel is Usaman)
- Poompathit Nittayaroj as Chiew (In Novel is Usaman)
- Wanchana Sawasdee (Bird) as Aok Rangkaya Putra
