= Game Rai Game Rak =

2011 Thai TV soap opera

- Also known as: Evil Game & Love Game
- Original title: เกมร้ายเกมรัก
- Genre: Drama; Romance
- Directed by: Ampaiporn Jitmaingong
- Starring: Nadech Kugimiya; Urassaya Sperbund
- Opening theme: Glap Ma Pen Muan Deum Dai Mai (Can we be the same?) by Crescendo
- Ending theme: Tee Rak (Sweetheart) by Pramote Pathan
- Country of origin: Thailand
- Original language: Thai
- No. of episodes: 21

Production
- Producer: Lakorn Thai
- Production location: Thailand
- Running time: Friday (120 minutes); Saturday (135 minutes); Sunday (135 minutes)

Original release
- Network: Channel 3
- Release: 28 October – 11 December 2011

Game Rai Game Rak (Thai: เกมร้ายเกมรัก; RTGS: Kem Rai Kem Rak) is a Thai television drama, premiered on October 28, 2011 and last aired on December 11, 2011 on Channel 3. It starred Nadech Kugimiya and Urassaya Sperbund.

== Synopsis ==
Saichon (Nadech Kugimiya) is an islander living on Min island. One day, destiny leads him to find Fahlada (Urassaya Sperbund), a 17 years old girl lying unconscious on the beach. When she wakes up, he realizes that she lost all her memories. Saichon takes care of her and names her Nang Fah (angel) because he doesn't know her real name and she doesn't remember it. They fall in love with each other and live together.

One day, Chompooprae (Natwara Wongwasana), Fahlada's adopted sister saw her sister's picture in the tourist magazine, so she sends people to take Fahlada back. Chompooprae needs Fahlada in order for her to succeed in her adopted family's business. Chompooprae hires Yasa and his men to bring Fahlada back even though she fights to stay with Saichon. Saichon gets shot and has to recover all by himself. Fahlada gets shock therapy treatment until she regains her memories, but she loses her memories about Saichon and everything during the time that she was missing on Min Island. Chompooprae lies to her sister and doesn't tell her anything about Min island.

When Saichon awakens, he is devastated to learn that his Nang Fah is gone. He decides to go to Bangkok to look for her. Many years later, Saichon comes back from America to take care of the airline company in Thailand. He meets Chompooprae because she's the business partner he needs to work with. Chompooprae falls in love with him at first sight even though she is already engaged to P'Mor. So, she introduces him to her sister. Saichon is surprised and very glad when he meets Fahlada again. However, Fahlada's sister [chompooprae] and Yasa plots against Saichon and Fah which leads Saichon to believe falsely that Fahlada regained her memory and is disgusted by her past [which is not true]. This makes Saichon angry and leads him to rape/misbehave with Fahlada as she is his wife and starts abusing her to keep her forever with him and also for looking down on the past.

Later when he came to know the truth, he will realize his mistake and begs for forgiveness, their fate now resides on Fahlada who has to decide where they stand.

== Cast ==
=== Main ===
- Nadech Kugimiya (Barry) as Saichon/Charles
- Urassaya Sperbund (Yaya) as Fahlada/Nang Fah
- Natwara Wongwasana (Mint) as Chompooprae, Fahlada's adoptive older sister.
- Tanawat Wattanaputi (Pope) as Dr. Wattana

=== Supporting ===
- Savitree Suttichanond (Beau) as Mami
- Methus Treewattanawareesin (Jack) as James
- Chotika Wongwilas (Noey) as Plernta
- Pisanu Nimsakul (Boy) as Sahat
- Chaleumpol Tikumpornteerawong (Jack) as Taeloy
- Wut Surinthorn as Thongthai
- Kajanathaneeya Srirojwattana (Kitty) as Suay
- Kluay Chernyim as Sala
- Paweena Charivsakul (Jeab) as Saengdao
- Panyapol Dejsong (AA) as Yasa
- Wiyada Umarin as Pirka
- Theerachart Theerawittayangkool (Aood) as Nara
- Sripan Boonnak as Areefa
- Baromwut Hiranyatsathiti (Mik) as Veeradech
- Duangjai Hathaikarn as Aunt Niam
- Peter Thunasatra as Michael

== Awards and nominations ==
Year	Award/Recognition	Category	Nominee	Result
2011	Seesan Buntherng Awards	Couple of the Year	Nadech Kugimiya & Urassaya Sperbund	Won
2011	Seesan Buntherng Awards	Best Leading Actor	Nadech Kugimiya	Won
2011	Seesan Buntherng Awards	Popular Leading Actor	Nadech Kugimiya	Won
2011	Seesan Buntherng Awards	Female Rising Star	Natwara Wongwasana	Won
2011	Oops Magazine Awards	Best Couple	Nadech Kugimiya & Urassaya Sperbund	Won
2011	TV3 Fanclub Awards	Most Popular Actor	Nadech Kugimiya	Won
2011	TV3 Fanclub Awards	Most Popular Actress	Urassaya Sperbund	Won
2011	Entertainment Page 1 of 5	Best Actress	Urassaya Sperbund	Nominated
2011	Star's Light	Best Cinematography	Game Rai Game Rak	Nominated
2011	Star's Light	Best Editor	Game Rai Game Rak	Nominated
2011	Star's Light	Great Music Theatre	Pramote Pathan	Nominated
2011	Big Fan Can Vote Season 2	Cyber Fairy	Urassaya Sperbund	Won
2011	Big Fan Can Vote Season 2	Best Couple	Nadech Kugimiya & Urassaya Sperbund	Won
2011	Big Fan Can Vote Season 2	Male Rising Star	Tanawat Wattanaputi	Won
2012	9th Kom Chud Luek Awards	Popular Leading Actress	Urassaya Sperbund	Won
2012	9th Kom Chud Luek Awards	Popular Leading Actor	Nadech Kugimiya	Won
2012	9th Kom Chud Luek Awards	Popular Drama	Game Rai Game Rak	Nominated
2012	Bang Awards 2012	Girl of the Year 2012	Urassaya Sperbund	Won
2012	Bang Awards 2012	Best Couple	Nadech Kugimiya & Urassaya Sperbund	Nominated
2012	Kerd Awards	Best Couple	Nadech Kugimiya & Urassaya Sperbund	Won
2012	Gold Television Awards	Best Leading Actress	Urassaya Sperbund	Nominated
2012	Gold Television Awards	Best Leading Actor	Nadech Kugimiya	Nominated
2012	MThai Top Talk Awards	Top Talk About Character Couples	Nadech Kugimiya & Urassaya Sperbund	Won
2012	MThai Top Talk Awards	Female Rising Star	Natwara Wongwasana	Won
2012	Mekhala Television Award	Best Actress	Urassaya Sperbund	Nominated
2012	Mekhala Television Award	Popular Leading Actress	Urassaya Sperbund	Won
2012	Mekhala Television Award	Popular Leading Actor	Nadech Kugimiya	Won
2012	Siam Dara Star Awards	Best Actor	Nadech Kugimiya	Won
2012	Siam Dara Star Awards	Best Actress	Urassaya Sperbund	Nominated
2012	Siam Dara Star Awards	Popular Leading Actor	Nadech Kugimiya	Won
2012	Siam Dara Star Awards	Siam Dara Heartthrob	Urassaya Sperbund	Won
2012	Siam Dara Star Awards	Popular Vote Woman	Urassaya Sperbund	Nominated
2012	Siam Dara Star Awards	Popular Vote Man	Nadech Kugimiya	Nominated
2012	Siam Dara Star Awards	Best Villain	Natwara Wongwasana	Nominated
2012	Siam Dara Star Awards	Popular Drama	Game Rai Game Rak	Nominated
2012	Siam Dara Star Awards	Director Wonderful TV series	Ampaiporn Jitmaingong	Nominated
2012	Sudsapda Young and Smart Vote 2011	Popular Leading Actor	Nadech Kugimiya	Nominated
2012	Sudsapda Young and Smart Vote 2011	Popular Leading Actress	Urassaya Sperbund	Nominated
2012	3rd Annual Nattaraj Awards	Best Leading Actor	Nadech Kugimiya	Won
