= So Cool (band) =

Thai band (2001-2015)

So Cool (โซคูล)
- Origin: Phitsanulok, Thailand
- Genres: Pop rock, alternative rock, alternative metal, speed metal
- Years active: 2004–2015 2025–present
- Label: UP^G/GMM Grammy
- Members: Golf - Tattep Prasong; Jan - Pratchanan Tongsuk; James - Nawatsapol Tongsuk
- Past members: Joke - Kornpop Chancharoen; March - Phubes Chancharoen

So Cool (Thai: โซคูล) was a Thai rock band from Phitsanulok. They have released a total of seven albums plus one compilation album. The group also produce Thai country songs which were included in their album.

== History ==
=== Formation ===
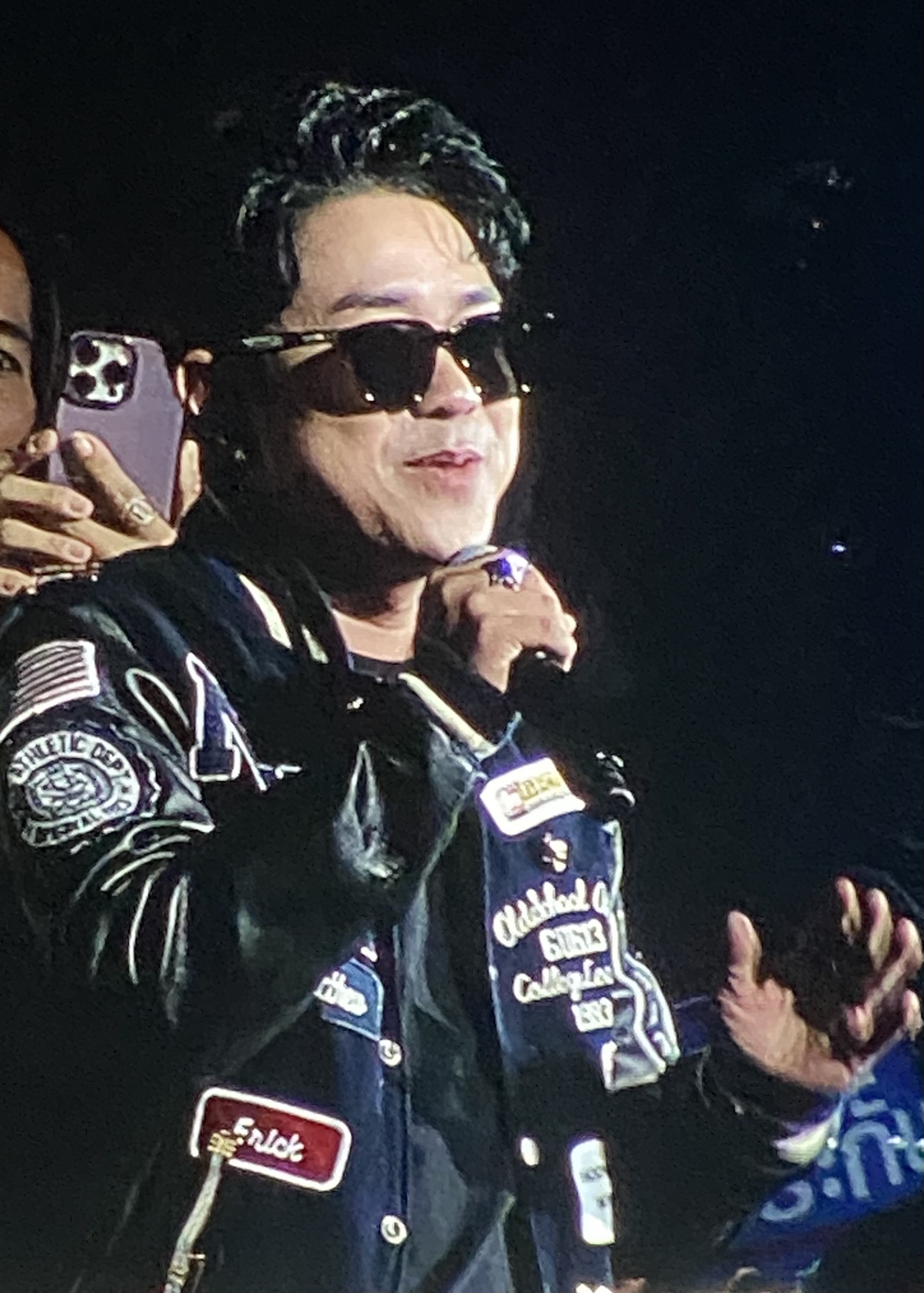
Joke — the former lead vocal

The sons from two families who lived near each other in Phitsanulok formed the rock band So Cool, with Joke as the vocalist and guitarist. Joke is the older brother of March, the drummer whilst the guitarist, Jan, is the older brother of James.

=== Competitions ===
Before becoming a band with GMM Grammy, So Cool had performed on more than 100 stages and competed in many music contests in their province, including the Asian Beat Band Competition, one of the greatest music competition in Thailand. The winner of the competition would represent Thailand to compete in Malaysia. They put in a substantial effort to practice after school and eventually won the 1st prize and the 'Best Performance' prize from the contest. Unfortunately, the contest in Malaysia was cancelled due to Terrorism on 11 September.

=== Debut album ===
In 2004, GMM Grammy, one of the biggest music label in Thailand, convinced So Cool to join them and have their debut album. The album was released on March 16, 2004 and was named 'So Cool', just like their band's name.

=== 2005-2007 projects ===
They released only one album each year, So Hot in 2005, Soda in 2006 and continued with a special album So Hits in the same year. Never Die My Love came in 2007.

=== Addition of another member (Golf) ===
In 2008, So Cool had a big surprise announcement that they have welcomed a new vocalist, Golf, into their band. The group met Golf in Phayao when he was performing with his band as an opening band for So Cool.

=== First album with new member ===
On August 19, 2008, So Cool released their fifth album, Five, in which Joke and Golf took turns as a lead vocalist for different songs.

=== Break-up ===
On December 31, 2015, Joke, as So Cool's front man, posted on the band's Facebook fanpage that So Cool is breaking up because he wanted to focus more on his family. Later, Joke and March (his brother and So Cool's former drummer) formed a new band called Mushroom Hunter.

== Discography ==
=== Albums ===
- So Cool (16 March 2004)
- So Hot (26 August 2005)
- Soda (27 June 2006)
- Never Die My Love (17 July 2007)
- Five (19 August 2008)
- So Cold (17 February 2011)
- Social (14 October 2012)

=== Compilation album ===
- So Hits (27 October 2006)

== Band members ==
Member

- Tattep Prasong (Golf) - vocal (2008-2015,2025-present)
- Pratchanan Tongsuk (Jan) - guitar (2004-2015,2025-present)
- Nawatsapol Tongsuk (James) - bass guitar (2004-2015,2025-present)

=== Former member ===
- Kornpop Chancharoen (Joke) - vocal, guitar (2004-2015)
- Phubes Jancharoen (March) - drums (2004-2015)
