= Fast and Feel Love =

2022 Thai comedy film

- Theatrical release poster
- Directed by: Nawapol Thamrongrattanarit
- Screenplay by: Nawapol Thamrongrattanarit
- Produced by: Nawapol Thamrongrattanarit; Vanridee Pongsittisak; Chenchonnee Soonthornsaratul; Thananuj Ebrahim
- Starring: Urassaya Sperbund; Nat Kitcharit
- Cinematography: Natdanai Naksuwarn
- Edited by: Panayu Kunvanlee
- Music by: Mellow Tunes; Siwat Homkham; Pokpong Jitdee; Korkiat Ratanasanya
- Production companies: Happy Ending Film; Very Sad Pictures
- Distributed by: GDH 559
- Release date: 6 April 2022
- Running time: 132 minutes
- Country: Thailand
- Language: Thai
- Box office: $581,000

Fast and Feel Love (Thai: เร็วโหด..เหมือนโกรธเธอ) is a 2022 Thai parody action comedy film written, directed and produced by Nawapol Thamrongrattanarit, starring Urassaya Sperbund and Nat Kitcharit distributed by GDH.

== Plot ==
Urassaya "Yaya" Sperbund plays J, a young woman caring for her boyfriend, Kao (played by Nat Kitcharit), who is competing to become the fastest cup stacking competitor in the world. After Kao is dumped by J, he has to learn basic adulting skills and try to win her back.

== Cast ==
- Urassaya Sperbund as "Jay"
- Nat Kitcharit as "Kao"
- Anusara Korsamphan as "Metal"
- Kanokwan Butrachart as "Kao's Mother"
- Wipawee Patnasiri as "Por"
- Keetapat Pongruea as "Pai-Liu"
- Lee Joo-hong as "Mr. Kang"
- Kim Chan-young as "Mr. Woo"
- Joshua Ugochukwu Ezunagu as "Edward"
- Marvelous Ndigwe as "Edward's Mother"
- Napak Tricharoendech as "Yam"

== Production ==
On Sunday, 24 October 2021, the list of actors for Fast and Feel Love was announced and filming started. Director Nawapol Thamrongrattanarit stated the film would be somewhat more concise than his previous work. He wanted to portray the daily lives of people over the age of 30 through intimate stories, and chose sports stacking. This film officially ended filming on Sunday, 26 December 2021.

Many of the film's workshops were done on Zoom due to COVID-19 lockdowns. Sperbund said, "I listened a lot to rock band Imagine Dragons to help me get into my character."

== Themes ==
A main theme of the film is the daily lives and challenges of people as they age out of their 20s and into their 30s.

== Release ==
Fast and Feel Love was released on Wednesday, 6 April 2022 (Chakri Memorial Day) by GDH.

In July 2022, it was selected as opening film of the 21st New York Asian Film Festival, where it was screened at Walter Reade Theater, Film at Lincoln Center on 15 July for its international premiere. It was also invited to the 26th Fantasia International Film Festival and was screened for its Canadian premiere on 18 July 2022.

== Reception and awards ==
Samuel Jamier, executive director of the New York Asian Film Festival (NYAFF), said the film is fast-moving with hilarious moments. He also remarked, "As the film says, sport stacking is genderless, ageless and border-free, which is a real game-changer."

=== Awards ===
Year	Award	Category	Recipient	Result	Ref.
2022	21st New York Asian Film Festival	Rising Star Asia Award	Urassaya Sperbund	Won	
2022	21st New York Asian Film Festival	Uncaged Award	Fast and Feel Love	Nominated	
