= Duang Jai Akkanee =

Thai television soap opera

- Thai theatrical release poster
- Also known as: Akkanee's Heart
- ดวงใจอัคนี
- Directed by: Yutthana Lophanphaibun
- Starring: Nadech Kugimiya; Urassaya Sperbund
- Opening theme: Hai Rak Dern Tang Ma Jer Gan (Let Love Meet) by Pop calories blah blah & Bowling Manida
- Ending theme: Ther Keu Dungjai Khong Chan (You're my heart) by Pongsak Rattanapong
- Country of origin: Thailand
- Original language: Thai
- No. of episodes: 10

Production
- Producer: No Problem
- Production location: Thailand
- Running time: Friday - Sunday

Original release
- Network: Channel 3
- Release: 5 November – 26 November 2010

Related
- Thara Himalaya; Pathapee Leh Ruk

Duang Jai Akkanee (Thai: ดวงใจอัคนี; RTGS: Duang Chai Akkhani) is a 2010 Thai lakorn 1 in 4 drama series 4 Hua Jai Haeng Khun Khao (4 Hearts of the Mountain) that is aired on Channel 3 (Thailand). It starred Nadech Kugimiya and Urassaya Sperbund.

== Plot ==
Because of the conflict between 2 families from the fathers' generation, Akkanee and Ajjima have been enemies with each other since they were kids. When they grow up and take care of their own dairy farm which there is the white fence as a border, the quarrel and fight often happens between them. However, under their harshness against each other, they secretly care about each other.

Later, when many incidents lead them to open their hearts to each other, they have to face the big barrier. Ajjima's father is still stubborn and does not accept this son-in-law-to-be. Can Akkanee get through the barrier?

== Cast ==
=== Main cast ===
- Nadech Kugimiya (Barry) as Akkanee (Fai) Adisuan
- Urassaya Sperbund (Yaya) as Ajjima (Jeed) Potsawat
- Prin Suparat (Mark) as Pathapee (Din) Adisuan
- Pakorn Chatborirak (Boy) as Wayupak (Lom) Adisuan

=== Supporting cast ===
- Metanee Buranasiri as Pisarn Potsawat
- Krerk Chiller as P'Noo-Tor
- Chokchai Boonworametee (Boy) as Sila Potsawat
- Panthila Fooklin (Air) as Pimnapa (Peemai)
- Jirayu Tantragool (Got) as Yai
- Benjapol Cheoyarun (Golf) as Sak
- Santisuk Promsiri (Noom) as Montree Adisuan
- Jintara Sukapat (Mam) as Supansa Adisuan
- Ronadech Wongsaroj (Naem) as Preuk
- Sumolthip Leungurai (Kubkib) as Pachanee (Milk)
- Kluay Chern-Yim as Pong
- Panomkorn Tungtatsawat (San) as Kraipope (Krai)

=== Special appearances ===
- Kimberly Ann Voltemas as Tipthara "Nam" Adisuan-Rajaput (2 episodes)
- Chalida Vijitvongthong as Cha-Aim Vongvanitsakunkit (12 episode)
- waranya leartkredtrakon as Meena

== Awards and nominations ==
Year	Award/Recognition	Category	Nominee	Result
2010	Top Awards	Best Rising Actress	Urassaya Sperbund	Won
2010	Top Awards	Best Rising Actor	Nadech Kugimiya	Won
2010	Seesan Buntherng Awards	Female Rising Star	Urassaya Sperbund	Won
2010	Seesan Buntherng Awards	Male Rising Star	Nadech Kugimiya	Won
2010	TV3 Fanclub Awards	Female Rising Star	Urassaya Sperbund	Won
2010	TV3 Fanclub Awards	Male Rising Star	Nadech Kugimiya	Won
2010	Mthai Top Talk Awards	Top Talk About Actress	Urassaya Sperbund	Won
2010	Nataraj Award	Best Actor	Nadech Kugimiya	Nominated
2010	TV Gold Awards	Best Actor	Nadech Kugimiya	Nominated
2011	Siam Dara Awards	Female Rising Star	Urassaya Sperbund	Won
2011	Siam Dara Awards	Male Rising Star	Nadech Kugimiya	Won
2011	Daradaily the Great Awards	Rising Star Actress of the Year	Urassaya Sperbund	Won
2011	Bang Award 2011	Boy of the Year	Nadech Kugimiya	Won
2011	Bang Award 2011	Girl of the Year	Urassaya Sperbund	Nominated
2011	Ooops Magazines Awards	Best On Screen Couple	Nadech Kugimiya & Urassaya Sperbund	Won
