= Ab Ruk Online =

2015 Thai TV series

- Also known as: Secret Love Online
- แอบรักออนไลน์
- Written by: Chatrarat Kaewmorakot
- Directed by: Aew Ampaiporn Jitmaingong
- Starring: Ann Thongprasom; Peter Corp Dyrendal; Prin Suparat; Kimberly Ann Voltemas
- Country of origin: Thailand
- Original language: Thai

Production
- Producer: Ann Thongprasom
- Production location: Thailand
- Running time: Wednesdays and Thursdays 20:20

Original release
- Network: Channel 3
- Release: January 7 – February 25, 2015

Ab Ruk Online is a Thai drama series that aired on Channel 3 that stars Ann Thongprasom, Peter Corp Dyrendal, Prin Suparat, and Kimberly Ann Voltemas under Thong Entertainment. Ratings for the drama was considered solid, although the numbers spanning between only 4 and 6 percent. The drama proved to be a massive success in the mainland with social media coverage. With the highest ratings rate on the last week aired.

== Synopsis ==
Awatsaya (Ann Thongprasom) is a tough boss who secretly falls in love with Pranont, (Prin Suparat) her new subordinate. In order to maintain her image as a "boss" she uses an online chat program to secretly investigate and court Pranont using the alias "Khun Ab Ruk" meaning 'Miss Secret Love.'

As their love begins to bloom she accidentally reveals her secret to Lipda (Peter Corp Dyrendal) the handsome yet insidious Managing Director of the company. After learning Awatsaya's secret he helps her move on with Pranont, but later on falls in love with her himself. Meanwhile, Pribprao (Kimberly Ann Voltemas) pretends to be the real "Khun Ab Ruk," which further complicates the web of love.

== Cast ==
=== Main cast ===
- Ann Thongprasom as Awasaya
- Peter Corp Dyrendal as Lipda
- Mark Prin Suparat as Pranon
- Kimberly Ann Voltemas as Pribprao

=== Supporting cast ===
- Angie Hastings as Jarawee/Jan
- Pokchat Tiemchai as Roonglada
- Tuk Boriboon Junreung as Ruj
- Sumonthip Leungutai|Kubkib Sumonthip Leungutai as Lilly
- Sriphan Cheuanchomboon as Sandy
- Ekkachai Euasangkomsret as Saranyu
- Em Apinun Prasertwattanakul as Ongsa
- Sarocha Watitapun|Tao Sarocha Watitapun as Poom
- Pratthana Sutchukorn as Prim
- Daraneenuch Pho-thi-piti as Preaw
- Arnant Boonnark as Peera
- Yodmanu Pamornmontri as Pod
- Pimonwan Hoonthongkham as Waew
- Sineenart Pho-thiwase as Yai Aroon
- Napat Choomchittree as Hoon Kheun
- Chanathip Pisutsereewong as Phoom
- Peter Thanasuth as Matt
- Corner Warithnant as James
- Junya Thanasawarngkul as Phen
- Chalermpol Thi-khampornteerawong as Sahus

== Ratings ==
#EPISODE	ORIGINAL BROADCAST DATE	AVERAGE AUDIENCE RATINGS (AGB NIELSEN)
1	7 January 2015	5.4%
2	8 January 2015	5.4%
3	14 January 2015	4.9%
4	15 January 2015	4.9%
5	21 January 2015	5.2%
6	22 January 2015	5.3%
7	28 January 2015	5.3%
8	29 January 2015	5.1%
9	4 February 2015	Did Not Enter Top 10 Ratings Chart (Unknown)
10	5 February 2015	5.4%
11	11 February 2015	5.1%
12	12 February 2015	5.2%
13	18 February 2015	4.7%
14	19 February 2015	6.1%
15	25 February 2015	6.7%

== International broadcast ==
Country	Network	Airing dates
Cambodia	PNN	2015
Vietnam	HTV7	August 3, 2017 – on air
Philippines	GMA News TV (now GTV)	January 18 – March 5, 2021
