= Torranee Ni Nee Krai Krong =

- Thai theatrical release poster
- Also known as: Who does this earth belong to?
- ธรณีนี่นี้ใครครอง)
- Directed by: Yutthana Lophanphaibun
- Starring: Nadech Kugimiya; Urassaya Sperbund
- Opening theme: Aab Chob (Secretly Admiring) by La-Ong-Fong; Hai Rak Man Toh Nai Jai (Let love grow up in my heart) by Nadech Kugimiya
- Ending theme: Khon Bon Fah Tongkarn Hai Rak (Someone on heaven wants us to love each other) by Pongsak Rattanapong & Lydia
- Country of origin: Thailand
- Original language: Thai
- No. of episodes: 17

Production
- Producer: No Problem
- Production location: Thailand
- Running time: Friday - Sunday

Original release
- Network: Channel 3
- Release: 29 June – 4 August 2012

Torranee Ni Nee Krai Krong (Thai: ธรณีนี่นี้ใครครอง; RTGS: Thorani Ni Ni Khrai Khrong) is a 2012 Thai television drama that is aired on Channel 3 (Thailand). It starred Nadech Kugimiya and Urassaya Sperbund.

== Plot ==
The story is about Athit and Darunee. Athit is an agriculture graduate. Instead of working as a government employee, he decides to do farming. So, his father sent him to work at his grandmother’s farm. Grandmother Daeng welcomed him because all her children do not want to do farming and left the land. Athit works hard and soon he becomes Daeng’s favorite grandchildren. Living in this land, not only hard work, but Athit has to deal with problems from Darunee, a high-school girl who is an adopted sister of Daeng. Darunee is afraid that he will steal love from Daeng. Years later, Daeng passes away. In the will, she assigned Athit to take care of her property and be Darunee’s guardian. Darunee is growing up and she started to understand Athit more. She knows that he puts a lot of effort to develop the land. They help each other to solve the problems on the farm. The relationship between them is getting better. However, the story does not end easily. They both do not know what their hearts need.

== Cast ==
- Nadech Kugimiya (Barry) as Athit
- Urassaya Sperbund (Yaya) as Darunee
- Duangta Tungkamanee (Took) as Grandma Daeng
- Vivid bavornkiratikajorn (Tee) as Vethang
- Savitree Suttichanond (Beau) as Tunlayanee (Toon)
- Sumonthip Leuanguthai (Gubgib) as Wiyada
- Daraneenuch Pothipiti as Aunt Kaew
- Kluay Chernyim as Uncle KrengWayne Falconer as Pravate
- Chalermpol Tikampornwong (Jack) as Aueng
- Kanokpong Anurakjanyong as Pan
- Akarin Areerak (Ae Chernyim) as Tod
- Benjapol ChoeyArun (Golf) as Paitoon
- Rungthong Ruamthong as Wilailak
- Thansita Suwacharathanakit (Chompoo) as Thongprasri
- Sirinuch Petch-Urai as Kamma
- Santi Santiwechakul as Singthong
- Jaturong Korimas as Thongbai
- Pajaree Na Nakorn (poodle) as Tu
- Thiparin Yodthanasawas as Thongprasarn
- Nawaporn Boonmee as Thongprasom
- Jumpol Adulkittiporn as Workers (EP3) (1/7/2555)
- Thamapon Charuchitranon as Ruch
- Jirayu Tangsrisuk as Manop
- Suppasit Jongcheveevat as policeman

== Original soundtrack ==
Song	Artist
Hai Rak Man Toh Nai Jai (Let love grow up in my heart)	Nadech Kugimiya
Khon Bon Fah Tongkarn Hai Rak (Someone on heaven wants us to love each other)	Pongsak Rattanaphong & Lydia
Ah Karn Rak (Symptoms of Love)	Urassaya Sperbund
Aab Chob (Secretly Admiring)	La-Ong-Fong
Ja Lerk Jao Choo (I will stop being flirty)	Vivid bavornkiratikajorn

== Awards and nominations ==
Year	Award	Category	Nominated work	Result
2012	TV3 Fanclub Awards 2012	Most Popular Actor	Nadech Kugimiya	Won
2012	TV3 Fanclub Awards 2012	Most Popular Actress	Yaya Urassaya	Won
2012	TV3 Fanclub Awards 2012	Most Popular Lakorn	Torranee Ni Nee Krai Krong	Won
2012	Top Awards	Best Leading Actor	Nadech Kugimiya	Won
2013	Daradaily The Great Awards	Best Leading Actor	Nadech Kugimiya	Won
2013	10th Kom Chud Luek Awards	Most Popular Actress	Yaya Urassaya	Won
2013	10th Kom Chud Luek Awards	Most Popular Lakorn	Torranee Ni Nee Krai Krong	Won
2013	Mekhala Awards	Best Society Lakorn	Torranee Ni Nee Krai Krong	Won
2013	Mekhala Awards	Best Leading Actress	Yaya Urassaya	Won
2013	Mekhala Awards	Popular Male Star of the Year	Nadech Kugimiya	Won
2013	Mekhala Awards	Popular Female Star of the Year	Yaya Urassaya	Won
2013	4th Annual Nattaraj Awards	Best Leading Actor	Nadech Kugimiya	Won
