= Chotika Wongwilas =

Thai actress and model

- โชติกา วงศ์วิลาศ
- Born: Weawari Wongkruth; July 15, 1984 (age 42); Phatthalung Thailand
- Other names: Noey (เนย); Sudarat Wongruth
- Education: Prince of Songkla University; Chulalongkorn University
- Occupation: Actress
- Years active: 2007–present
- Spouse: Chansiri Maneechy (m. 2016)
- Children: 2

Chotika Wongwilas (Thai: โชติกา วงศ์วิลาศ; RTGS: Chotika Wongwilat; born July 15, 1984), nickname Noey (เนย; Noei), is an actress under contract with Thailand's Channel 3 for whom she has acted in several lakorn (Thai television soap operas). Known primarily for her "villainous roles", she first appeared in the 2007 drama Invisible Friend (เพื่อนซี้ล่องหน). Other notable performances include her work in Neung Nai Suang (หนึ่งในทรวง; Only you in my heart) in 2015, Cubic (คิวบิก) in 2014, and Game Rai Game Rak (เกมร้ายเกมรัก; Evil Game/Love Game) in 2011.

Chotika grew up in Phatthalung Province in southern Thailand where she attended the Satri Phatthalung School. She obtained her B.A. in IT Business Management at Prince of Songkla University and then went on to earn a Master's degree in Recreation and Tourism Management at Chulalongkorn University.

== Filmography ==
=== Dramas ===
- Plerng Prai (Ch.3 2009)
- Hua Jai Song Park 2009 (Ch.3 2009/2010)
- Tat Dao Bussaya (2009) (Ch.3 2010)
- Suay Rerd Cherd Sode (Ch.3 2010)
- Tard Rak (Ch.3 2011)
- Pla Lhai Paai Daeng (Ch.3 2011)
- Plerng Torranong (Ch.3 2011)
- Kol Ruk Luang Jai (Ch.3 2011)
- Game Rai Phaai Game Ruk (Ch.3 2011) with Pidsanu Nimsakul
- Mam Gaem Daeng (Ch.3 2012)
- Waew Mayura (CH3/2012)
- Office Pichit Jai (Ch.9/2013)
- Suphapburut Juthathep, Khun Chai Puttipat (CH.3 2013)
- Ai Koon Pee (CH.3 2013)
- Look Tard (Ch.3 2014)
- Cubic (Ch.3 2014)
- Yah Leum Chan (2014) (Ch.3 2014)
- Ruk Ok Rit (Ch.3 2014)
- Neung Nai Suang (Ch.3 2015)
- Bu Ram Pram Pra (Ch.3 2015)
- Plub Plerng See Chompoo with Tah Warit Tipgomut (Ch.3 2015)
- Than Chay Kammalor (CH.3 2016)
- Payak Rai Ruk Puan (Ch.3 2016)
- Kularb Tud Petch (Ch.3 2016)
- Kleun Cheewit (Ch.3 2017)
- Bunlang Dok Mai with Mawin Taweepol (Ch.3 2017)
- Duangjai Dhevaprom, Kwanruetai (CH.3 2024)
