= Nueng Nai Suang =

Thai television drama series

- Also known as: Only You in My Heart; One in My Heart
- Original title: หนึ่งในทรวง
- Genre: Drama; Romance; Comedy; Historical
- Written by: Nuttiya Sirakornwilai
- Directed by: Paajaew Yuthana Lorphanpaibul
- Starring: Jirayu Tangsrisuk; Urassaya Sperbund
- Country of origin: Thailand
- Original language: Thai
- No. of episodes: 12

Production
- Producer: No problem
- Production location: Thailand
- Running time: 1 hour and 40 minutes

Original release
- Network: Channel 3
- Release: May 28 – July 8, 2015

Nueng Nai Suang (Thai: หนึ่งในทรวง) is a 2015 Thai television drama series starring Jirayu Tangsrisuk and Urassaya Sperbund. It aired on Channel 3 from 28 May to 8 July 2015.

The series is based on the novel of the same name by Busayamas (the pseudonym of Thai author Somnuk Sutabutra). Two earlier television adaptations of the novel were produced, airing in 1992 and 2005.

== Synopsis ==
Anawat Patcharapojanat (nicknamed Nueng), the son of former diplomat Vit Patcharapojanat, returns to Thailand after completing a master's degree in diplomacy in France. His arrival attracts widespread attention, particularly from young women like Sisuk and her friend Songsang. However, Hatairat Ratchapitak—an orphan raised by Sut and Thip Duenpradap as their adoptive daughter—remains unimpressed, openly criticizing arrogant men. Despite visiting relatives and the Duenpradap family, Anawat repeatedly misses encounters with Hatairat and his old friend Pinij Panatpong, who is staying at his brother Pinai's ranch to process his feelings for Hatairat.

The next day, Anawat finally meets Hatairat at the Duenpradap house alongside Sattha and Suda. He immediately develops a negative impression of her due to her apparent indifference, interpreting her behavior as disrespectful. Determined to retaliate, Anawat vows to humble her. Sattha and Suda later organize a birthday party for Sut, inviting extended family and friends to reconcile the pair.

At the party, Songsang dances with Anawat while Hatairat receives attention from other suitors. Though Anawat and Hatairat secretly observe each other, the event ends peacefully. Despite claiming to despise her, Anawat incessantly provokes Hatairat, disrupting her daily life. When Khun Chai temporarily relocates to the United States, Hatairat is compelled to teach at Anawat's residence.

Misunderstandings escalate when Dr. Prasong announces his marriage to Ura. Anawat mistakenly assumes Hatairat is the bride, feeling betrayed by her apparent indifference. After discovering she is merely a bridesmaid, he storms away in anger. Tensions peak when Anawat caresses Hatairat during a drive home, provoking her fury while he relishes his perceived victory.

Meanwhile, Pinij reluctantly agrees to marry Jampee under familial pressure. Before the wedding, he falls gravely ill and requests to see Hatairat. Anawat escorts her to visit Pinij, but he is transferred to Bangkok before their arrival. Stranded overnight at a ranch due to car troubles, Anawat and Hatairat face reprimands from Vit and Sut for impropriety. To salvage her reputation, Anawat is forced into an engagement with Hatairat, which she accepts to assert superiority over Sisuk and Songsang.

Anawat later confesses his love and proposes marriage, but Hatairat rejects him. Soon after, Vit informs her that Anawat has been critically injured in a Chiang Mai car accident. Distraught, Hatairat rushes to his side, where the two reconcile and declare their mutual affection. They marry, vowing to cherish each other unconditionally.

== Cast ==
- Jirayu Tangsrisuk as Nueng/Anawat
- Urassaya Sperbund as Hatairach/Poom
- Fair Gundon Akhazzan as Pu
- Poly Pattrakorn Tungsupakul as Sattha Panee
- Nam Ronadech Wongsaroj as Khun Chai
- Michelle Behrmann as Paen
- Chotika Wongwilas as Songsaeng
- Ohm Kanin Stanley as Pinit
- Namnung Suttidachanai ad Chulee
- Ball Jitpanu as Khun Mor Prasong
- Daraneenuch Pohpiti as Mae Nom
- Mick Boromwuti Hiranyatihi as Khun Rewy

Years	1992	2005	2015
Channels	Channel 3	Channel 3	Channel 3
Making companies	Back State Group Co., Ltd.	Lakornthai Co., Ltd.	No problem Co., Ltd.
Screenplay	Pawanrat Naksuriya	Nuttiya Sirakornwilai	Nuttiya Sirakornwilai
Directors	Suprawat Pattamasoot	Wachara Pan-iem	Yutthana Lorphanpaiboon
Characters	Main cast		
Anawat Patcharapojanat (Neung)	Puntakarn Thongjure	Theeradej Wongpuapan	Jirayu Tangsrisuk
Hathairath Radchapitak (Pum)	Khwanruedi Klomklom	Janie Tienphosuwan	Urassaya Sperbund
Sattha Duen-Pradab (Pu)	Sudhipong Vatanajang	Sira Patrat	Gundon Akhazzan
Pannika (Taew) / Pannee Panaspong (Nee)	Yupawadee Lounsala	Saruta Reungwiriya	Pattrakorn Tungsupakul
Mom Radchawong Prasatporn Jaroonluk (Khun Chai)	Ron Banjongsang	Sukol Sasijulaka	Ronnadet Wongsaroj
Suda Duen-Pradab (Paen)	Sunthari Lamom	Pakjira Wanasut	Michelle Behrmann
Characters	Supporting cast		
Pinit Panaspong (Ton / Nit)	Nai Suksakul	Chinsuves Jesjamras	Kanin Standly
SongSaeng Pisetkul (Song)	Sasimaporn Chaikomol	Jamie Bouher	Chotika Wongwilas
Mor Som Prasong (1992) / Mor Prasong (2005) / Khun Mor Prasong (2015)	Korn Jomthip	Sayachai Devahastin Na Ayudhya	Kummun Klomkaew
Chulee	Benjawan Saingam	Naruemon Phongsuphap	Namnung Suttidachanai
Than-Thood Wit Padcharanat	Gumthorn Suwanpiyasiri	Kriengkrai Oonhanun	Kriengkrai Oonhanun
Khun-Nai SeeSuk Pisetkul	Suda Chuenban	Duangta Toongkamanee	Daran Thitakawin
Sut Duen-Pradab	Arnon Suwankrau	Somphob Benjatikul	Sukol Sasijulaka
Thip Duen-Pradab	Tarika Thidathit	Wasana Sitthiwet	Kampu Patamasut
Khun-Nai Noun-Khajee / Khun-Nai Noun Panaspong	Orasa Prompratan	Piyamas Maneeyakul	Kanlaya Lerdkasemsub
Mae Pim (1992, 2005) / Nom Pim (2015)	Rattanaporn Intarakamhaeng	Namngoen Bunnak	Daraneenute Pasutanavin
Mae O	Juree Osiri	Chongmas Plubpla	Mayuree Israsena Na Ayudhya
Khun Ying Kornkanok	Kanyalak Bamrungrak	Pimprapa Tangprabhaporn	Piranchaya Kachennukul
Bunteim			Tong Chuanchuen
Mom Pannarai	Pratana Banjongsang		
Mom Jao Prasansuk Jaroonluk	Adisak Sawetnan		
Sirikarnda	Chamaiporn Samrit		
Viyada	Chadaporn Jampreecha		
	Surin Suksing		
	Noppamas Amnuaykarn		
	Pattysia Lamnwaimans		
Characters	Cameo		
Thanakarn	Kasama Nissaipan		
Khun Jane	Seeda Puapimon		
Taiphob	Suprawat Pattamasoot		
Saran	Khomkrit Yuttiyong		
Pongchawee (Pong)	Viladda Wondurongwan	Wasuma Atikomnantha	Ratchaneeboon Pheinwikraisophon
Somboon	Pimpan Buranapim		
Dr.		Wachara Pan-iem	
Khun Rewy		Boromwuti Hiranyatithi	Boromwuti Hiranyatithi
Anawat (Neung) (Young)			Yongsin Wongpanitnont
Hathairath (Pum) (Young)		Lily Nawiya	
Sattha (Pu) (Young)			Phuwin Tangsakyuen
Suda (Paen) (Young)			Frances Aisika Burnett

== Original soundtracks ==
=== 1992 ===
No.	Title	Lyrics	Music	Artist(s)	Length
1.	"Nueng Nai Suang" (Thai: หนึ่งในทรวง)	Chairat Wongkiatkhajorn	Chairat Wongkiatkhajorn	Choosak Meethaworn	3:09
2.	"Hak Chan Khad Thoe" (Thai: หากฉันขาดเธอ)			Sawalee Pakaphan	3:20
Total length:					06:29

=== 2005 ===
No.	Title	Lyrics	Music	Artist(s)	Length
1.	"Pahk Mai Trong Gub Jai" (Thai: ปากไม่ตรงกับใจ)	INDYCAFE	INDYCAFE	Panthip Panchamawat	4:09
2.	"Pahk Mai Trong Gub Jai (Winter Version)" (Thai: ปากไม่ตรงกับใจ (Winter Version))	INDYCAFE	INDYCAFE	Pisut Srisawang	4:13
3.	"Piang Siau Jai" (Thai: เพียงเสี้ยวใจ)	INDYCAFE	INDYCAFE	Pisut Srisawang	3:02
Total length:					11:24

=== 2015 ===
No.	Title	Lyrics	Music	Artist(s)	Length
1.	"Nueng Diao Khue Thoe" (Thai: หนึ่งเดียวคือเธอ)	Narongvit Taechatanawat	Mooratha Ruamrak	Jirayu Tangsrisuk	3:30
2.	"Kiss" (Thai: จูบ)	Narongvit Taechatanawat	Chackkrit Muckanaso	Jirayu Tangsrisuk; Urassaya Sperbund	4:28
3.	"Nueng Diao Khue Thoe (A Cappella Version)" (Thai: หนึ่งเดียวคือเธอ (A Cappella Version))	Narongvit Taechatanawat	Mooratha Ruamrak	One Voice	4:17
4.	"Plai Thang" (Thai: ปลายทาง)	Narongvit Taechatanawat	Banana Boat	Fonpa Pramoj na Ayutthaya	3:43
Total length:					15:59

== Ratings ==
Red color — the number of the highest rating
Blue color — the number of the lowest rating
