= Klin Kasalong =

2019 Thai television soap opera

- Also known as: Scent of Love; The Scent of Memory
- Original title: กลิ่นกาสะลอง
- Genre: Historical, Romance, Drama, Supernatural
- Written by: Pranpramoon
- Directed by: Sant Srikaewlaw; Parada Kantapattanakul
- Starring: Urassaya Sperbund; James Ma
- Opening theme: สัญญากับคำว่ารอ (Promises and waiting) by Ten Nararak
- Ending theme: สัญญากาสะลอง (Promise Kasalong) by Saranyu Winaipanit
- Country of origin: Thailand
- Original languages: Thai, Northern Thai
- No. of episodes: 15

Production
- Producer: Thitima Sangkhaphithak
- Running time: 150 minutes

Original release
- Network: Channel 3
- Release: June 10 – July 29, 2019

Klin Kasalong (Thai: กลิ่นกาสะลอง) is a 2019 Thai television soap opera adapted from the eponymous novel written by Pisit Sreeprasert, a Chiang Mai University professor. The series premiered on June 10, 2019 and last aired on July 29, 2019 on Channel 3. It starred Urassaya Sperbund and James Ma. The series was notable for featuring extensive use of the Northern Thai language in dialogue, and featuring facets of Northern Thai culture, including attire and cultural landmarks like Wat Lok Molee in Chiang Mai. The series was broadcast on Channel 3, and became the channel's third highest rated drama in 2019, after Krong Kam and Thong Ek Mhorya Tha Chalong.

== Cast ==
=== Main ===
- Urassaya Sperbund as Kasalong / Songpeep / Dr. Pimpisa / Pimmada
- James Ma as Dr. Thanakrit / Sup / Prasawin
- Thakoon Karntip as Manfah / Dr. Pakpoom
- Natanat Losuwan as Mei / Wijitra / Mok

=== Supporting ===
- Montree Jenuksorn as Sunthorn (Pimpisa's father) / Nai Kwaen Mang (Kasalong, Songpeep's father)
- Penpak Sirikul as Pudkaew (Pimpisa's mother) / Thongbai (Kasalong, Songpeep's mother)
- Warit Tipgomut as Noijan Wanawech / Ramet Wanaret
- Kulteera Yordchang as Bua Kiang (young)
- Sirinuch Petchurai as Ah-Ma Tee-Nee (Grandmother Mo Sap and Bua Kiang)
- Thodsapol Siriwiwat as Ah-Kong Tian-Aee (Grandfather Mo Sap and Bua Kiang)
- Witaya Jethapai as Intha (Manfah's father)
- Naruemon Phongsuphap as Kam-Hom (Manfah's mother)
- Aranya Prathumthong as Bua-Tong (Wealthy Grocery)
- Wilawan Thalou as Sang-La (Chinese dessert seller)
- Sitang Punnapop as Fong-Kam (Vegetable and herb seller)
- Lerwith Sangsith as Sang (Servant of Mr. Mang's house) / Bhikkhu Tian (Priest)
- Supunnikar jumrernchai as kedkaew (Saito-san's wife) / Stand-in Kasalong / Songpeep
- Shogo Tanikawa as Sai-To (Ketkeaw's husband)

=== Guest ===
- Pisamai Vilaisak as Grandma Buakiang (Old Age) (Grandma Primpy, a former servant of the governor's house.) (Ep.1)
- Suchao Pongwilai as Aui Kaew (Old Age) (grandson, grandfather, father, teacher Intha) (Ep.1, 6, 8, 10, 15)
- Supranee Charoenphol as Panjit (Dr. Thanakrit's mother) (Ep.1, 3, 6, 8, 10, 14, 15)
- Sommart Praihirun as In-Tha (Sri Wan's father) (Ep.13–15)
- Watcharachai Sunthonsiri as Khru Dap (Ep.5–6)
- Pongsanart Vinsiri as Wongsingkam Wanawech (Little Chan's father/Rames' grandfather) (Ep.6–7, 10, 11, 13)
- Peter Tuinstra as Dr. Naekercard (Ep.2, 10–12)
- Chattarika Sittiprom as Sudawadee (Daughter of the Ministry of Education) (Ep.13)
- Ken Streutker as Dr. Kort (Ep.3, 5–6, 10–12)
- ??? as Aui Kaew (young) (Ep.13–15)
- Linpita Jindapoo as Sri Wan (Aui Kaew's mother) (Ep.13–15)

== Soundtracks ==
Song title	Artist	Ref.	Note
สัญญากาสะลอง (Promise Kasalong)	Saranyu Winaipanit		Opening theme
สัญญากับคำว่ารอ (Promises and waiting)	Ten Nararak		Ending theme
สัญญากาสะลอง (Cover Version)	James Ma		Special theme
