= The Crown Princess =

Thai television series

- Also known as: The Destiny of Love; Love Destiny; Likhit Rak
- Original title: ลิขิตรัก
- Genre: Action; Drama; Romance
- Written by: Natthiya Sirakonwilai; Kanlayanamit
- Directed by: Amphaiphon Chitmaingong
- Starring: Urassaya Sperbund; Nadech Kugimiya; Sara Legge; Intad Leowrakwong
- Country of origin: Thailand
- Original language: Thai
- No. of episodes: 13

Production
- Producer: Ann Thongprasom
- Production location: Thailand
- Running time: 110 minutes
- Production companies: Thong Entertainment Co., Ltd

Original release
- Network: Channel 3
- Release: May 14 – June 19, 2018

The Crown Princess (Thai: ลิขิตรัก, RTGS: Likhit Rak), is a Thai television series, premiered on May 14, 2018 and last aired on June 19, 2018 on Channel 3. It starred Urassaya Sperbund and Nadech Kugimiya and produced by Ann Thongprasom.

== Synopsis ==
Because her life was put into danger after her coronation, Crown Princess Alice (Urassaya Sperbund) of the country Hyross was secretly sent to Thailand, where Dawin Samuthyakorn (Nadech Kugimiya), a Lieutenant Commander of the Thai Navy and Navy SEAL, becomes her bodyguard.

== Cast ==
=== Main ===
- Urassaya Sperbund as Princess Alice Madeline Tereza Fillippe (aka Naree Singjun-Samuthyakorn)
- Nadech Kugimiya as Lieutenant Commander Dawin Samuthyakorn
- Sara Legge as Princess Catherine "Kate" William Ann Fillippe
- Intad Leowrakwong as Prince Alan Aaron Mark Andre Fillipe

=== Supporting ===
- Eduardo Alonso as kidnapper gangster leader
- Khunnarong Prathetrat as Pilot Ratchata "Hin" Janenapa
- Rawiwan Bunprachom as Sergeant Danika "Paen" Samuthyakorn
- Nirut Sirijanya as King Henry Antoine Phillipe of Hrysos
- Nithichai "Yuan" Yotamornsunthorn as Lieutenant Pakorn "Kan" Chanchit
- Natthapong Chartpong as Second Lieutenant Lopboon "Ling" Jitdeva
- Jakkrit Ammarat as General Sakchaiara Legge
- Parisaya Jaronetisat as JC, Alice's bodyguard
- Teerapong Leowrakwong as Prince Andre Fillippe
- Cindy Bishop as Princess Mona
- Yanin Vismitananda as Petra, Alice's bodyguard
- Matthew Deane as Prince William "Wil"
- Peter Corp Dyrendal as Haedeth
- Areeya Chumsai as Maj.Gen. Sawanee Samuthyakorn, Mother of Dawin
- Sakuntala Thianphairot as Priew, wife of Lopboon
- Jaidee Deedeedee as Sakchaiara's wife

=== Others ===
- Byron Bishop as Decha Samuthyakorn, Father of Dawin
- Kanut Rojanai as Dom
- Sasha Christensen as Princess Alice
- Sriphan Chunechomboon as Sawanee's bodyguard
- Pitchapa Phanthumchinda as Mutmee
- Kathaleeya McIntosh as Princess Natalie (Princess Alice' Mom)
- Anne Thongprasom as Princess Anna (Princess Kate's Mother)
- Passorn Boonyakiart
- Myria Benedetti
- Ryan Jett
- Jason Young

== Original soundtrack ==
- The opening song is Nah Tee Gub Hua Jai (in English "Duty and Heart") sung by Nadech Kugimiya and Mutmee Pimdao.
- The second song in the series is Distance (ระยะห่าง) by Max Jenmana.
- The third song in the series is Ruk Nai Jai (รัก ใน ใจ) by Suparuj Techatanon.

== Ratings ==
In the table below, the blue numbers represent the lowest ratings and the red numbers represent the highest ratings.

Episode	Original broadcast date	Episode titles	Average audience share
Episode	Original broadcast date	Episode titles	AGB Nielsen
1	May 14, 2018	Fire, Feud, Fury	4.6%
2	May 15, 2018	Adapt or Die	5.1%
3	May 21, 2018	A Man's Woman	4.8%
4	May 22, 2018	Duty or Love	4.5%
5	May 28, 2018	Best Friend	4.2%
6	May 29, 2018	Fugitive	4.0%
7	June 4, 2018	Time Is Up	4.3%
8	June 5, 2018	Compensation	4.5%
9	June 11, 2018	Shadow of the Crown	4.6%
10	June 12, 2018	The Proof of Love	5.1%
11	June 18, 2018	Choice and Decision	5.0%
12	June 19, 2018	The Crown Princess - Final	6.2%
Average			4.7%

== Awards and nominations ==
Year	Award	Category	Nominee	Result
2019	TV Gold Awards	Best Actor in a Leading Role	Nadech Kugimiya	Won
2019	TV Gold Awards	Best Actress in a Leading Role	Urassaya Sperbund	Nominated
2019	TV Gold Awards	Best Actress in a Supporting Role	Sara Legge	Won
2019	TV Gold Awards	Best Art Composition	Thong Entertainment	Won
2019	TV Gold Awards	Best Director	Amphaiphon Chitmaingong	Nominated
2019	TV Gold Awards	Best Drama	The Crown Princess	Nominated
2019	Nataraj Awards	Best Actor in a Leading Role	Nadech Kugimiya	Nominated
2019	Nataraj Awards	Best Costume Design	Wariya Phongkajorn	Nominated
2019	Nataraj Awards	Best Ensemble Cast	The Crown Princess	Nominated
