= Jirayu Tangsrisuk =

Thai actor and singer (born 1993)

- จิรายุ ตั้งศรีสุข
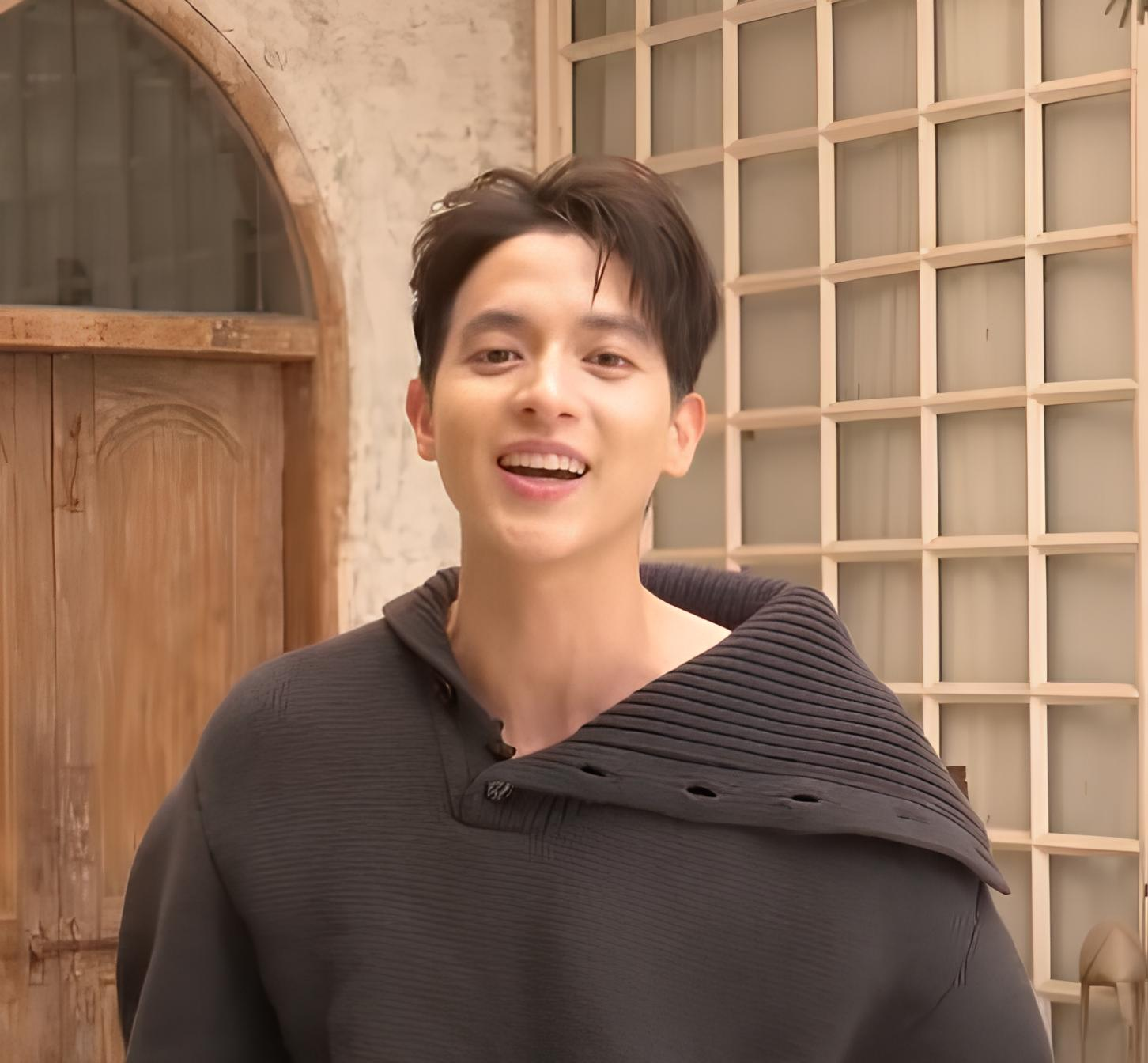
- James Jirayu in December 2022
- Born: Jirayuth Tangsrisuk; September 19, 1993 (age 32); Phichit, Thailand
- Other names: James; James Ji
- Education: Bachelor of Business Administration (BBA)
- Alma mater: Rangsit University
- Occupations: Actor; singer; model
- Years active: 2012–present
- Agent: Channel 3 (2012–2025)
- Notable work: Suphapburut Juthathep (2013); The One in My Heart (2015); Repercussion (2019)
- Height: 1.84 m (6 ft 0 in)
- Spouse: Benjamas Kittipitakkul (m. 2024)
- Children: 1

Signature
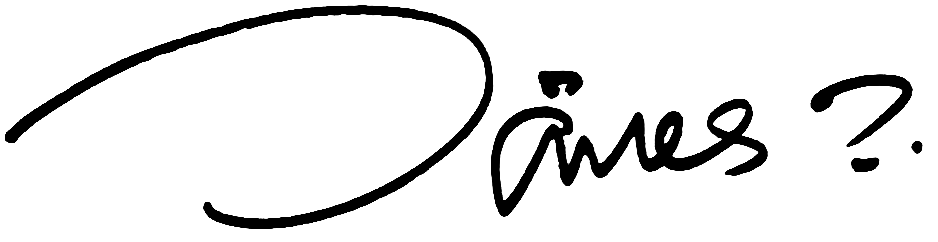

Jirayu Tangsrisuk (Thai: จิรายุ ตั้งศรีสุข, RTGS: Chirayu Tangsisuk; born September 19, 1993), also known as James Jirayu or James Ji, is a Thai actor, singer, and model. He is known for his roles in television dramas and films, including Suphapburut Juthathep (2013), Timeline (2014), The One in My Heart (2015), The Loyal Wife (2016), Fallen Angel (2017), Underneath the Same Sky (2018), Game of Affection (2018), Repercussion (2019), Mist of Love (2020), and Prophecy of Love (2020).

== Early life ==
Jirayu Tangsrisuk was born in Phichit, Thailand. He is the youngest child of Sermchai Tangsrisuk and Shotika Tangsrisuk. His parents chose the nickname James after the fictional character James Bond. He attended high school at Phichit Phitthakhom School, where he was also a territorial defense student. He studied Communication Arts at Rangsit University, in the field of radio and television broadcasting. Between 2013 and December 2017, Tangsrisuk transferred to the Business Administration program, majoring in Retail Business Management.

Tangsrisuk learned how to dance and sing at a young age and played bass in a high school band. In 2011, he won a modeling contest held by the cosmetics brand Mistine and began his career as a model.

In April 2012, Charnchalard Dhaweesap, owner of the entertainment agency Meta Talent Management, saw Tangsrisuk's photos on Facebook and scouted him. Although seven other agencies approached Tangsrisuk, he began his entertainment career under Dhaweesap's management.

== Career ==
Tangsrisuk made his television debut in the 2013 lakorn Khun Chai Puttipat. In September of that year, he made his film debut in First Love and soon became a highly paid actor. In late 2015, he traveled to Vietnam to take a martial arts class at Johnny Tri Nguyen's Lien Phong Academy in preparation for the action-heavy drama Padiwaradda (The Loyal Wife).

In 2017, Tangsrisuk ranked third on the list of highest-paid actors in Thailand, and he ranked second in April 2018. He also appeared in Krong Kam, which aired from February 26 to April 30, 2019. On March 26, 2021, he released his first extended play (EP), See More.

== Filmography ==
=== Television dramas ===
Year	Title	Role
2013	Suphapburut Juthathep	Mom Ratchawong Phutthiphat Juthathep
2013	Tong Neu Gao	Wanchaloem (Guest)
2013	Ruk Sutrit	Ittirit Patichat
2015	Nueng Nai Suang	Anawat Patcharapojanat
2016	Padiwaradda	Saran Siwaweth
2017	Idol × Warrior Miracle Tunes!	Demon King
2017	Buang Hong	Ramet Jirayuthanon
2018	Nueng Dao Fa Diao	Khanthong / Khanthin / Phra Sri Satcha
2018	Game Sanaeha	Lakkhanai Disathaporn
2019	Krong Kam	Kamol Aswarungruangkit
2020	Mist of Love	Plerngfah Sikhanon / Uthayothin / Rawi
2020	Payakorn Sorn Ruk	Theerut
2021	Are We Alright?	Ai
2022	The Deadly Affair	Ohm Aphinon
2023	To the Moon and Back	Dr. Purim (Asa)
2024	Never Enough	Mana Phromdeetham
2025	My Sassy Wedding	Ek Itthirit
TBA	Salesman	TBA

=== Films ===
Year	Title	Role	Notes
2013	First Love	Namnan	
2014	Timeline	Tan	Lead role
2015	Khun Thong Dang The Inspirations	Jon	Animation film; Voice only
2017	Home Away From Home	Backpacker	Japanese short film
2021	Om! Crush on Me	Ryosu	Lead role
2025	The Red Envelope	Himself	
2025	Tharae The Exorcist	Father Paolo	
