= Tawan Dueat =

- Also known as: Boiling Sun
- ตะวันเดือด
- Directed by: Chatchai Plengpanich; Atthaporn Teemakorn
- Starring: Prin Suparat; Urassaya Sperbund; Chalida Vijitvongthong; Thanavat Vatthanaputi
- Country of origin: Thailand
- Original language: Thai
- No. of episodes: 16

Production
- Producer: Chatchai Plengpanich
- Production location: Thailand
- Running time: Friday - Sunday

Original release
- Network: Channel 3
- Release: August 13 – September 18, 2011

Tawan Dueat (Thai: ตะวันเดือด, lit. "Boiling Sun") is a 2011 drama/romance/action Thai television soap opera that stars Prin Suparat, Urassaya Sperbund, Chalida Vijitvongthong, and Thanavat Vatthanaputi. It airs on Channel 3.

== Synopsis ==
After the young Tawan had escaped the massacre at Fah Roong Farm in Phu Prakarn City with his father's best friend Saroj (Somchai Khemklad), Tawan (Prin Suparat) was taught and raised to be a strong young man. In order to have a revenge, Tawan had disguised himself with the men who works for Charan (Johnny Anfone) the man who led a bunch of bandits invade Fah Roong Farm and kill people there. There he met Singh (Thanavat Vatthanaputi) a gang thief who helps him on his plans, and the two later became good friends.

Tawan and Singh arrives at Charan's place, which used to belong to Tawan's family, the two came across an abandoned farm house which only lives sisters Roong (Urassaya Sperbund) and Ploy Kwan (Chalida Vijitvongthong) who came to be the step daughters of Charan.

== Cast ==
- Prin Suparat (Mark) as Tawan/Seur
- Urassaya Sperbund (Yaya) as Phet Roong "Roong"/Khun Noo
- Chalida Vijitvongthong (Mint) as Ploy Kwan/Khun Noo
- Thanavat Vatthanaputi (Pope) as Singh

=== Supporting cast ===
- Somchai Khemklad as Saroj
- Johnny Anfone as Charan
- Saranyoo Prachakrit (Beam) as Decha
- Dom Haetrakul as Naroong

=== Guest cast ===
- Chatchai Plengpanich (Nok)
- Sinjai Plengpanich (Nok)
