= Warintorn Panhakarn =

Thai actor (born 1985)

- วรินทร ปัญหกาญจน์
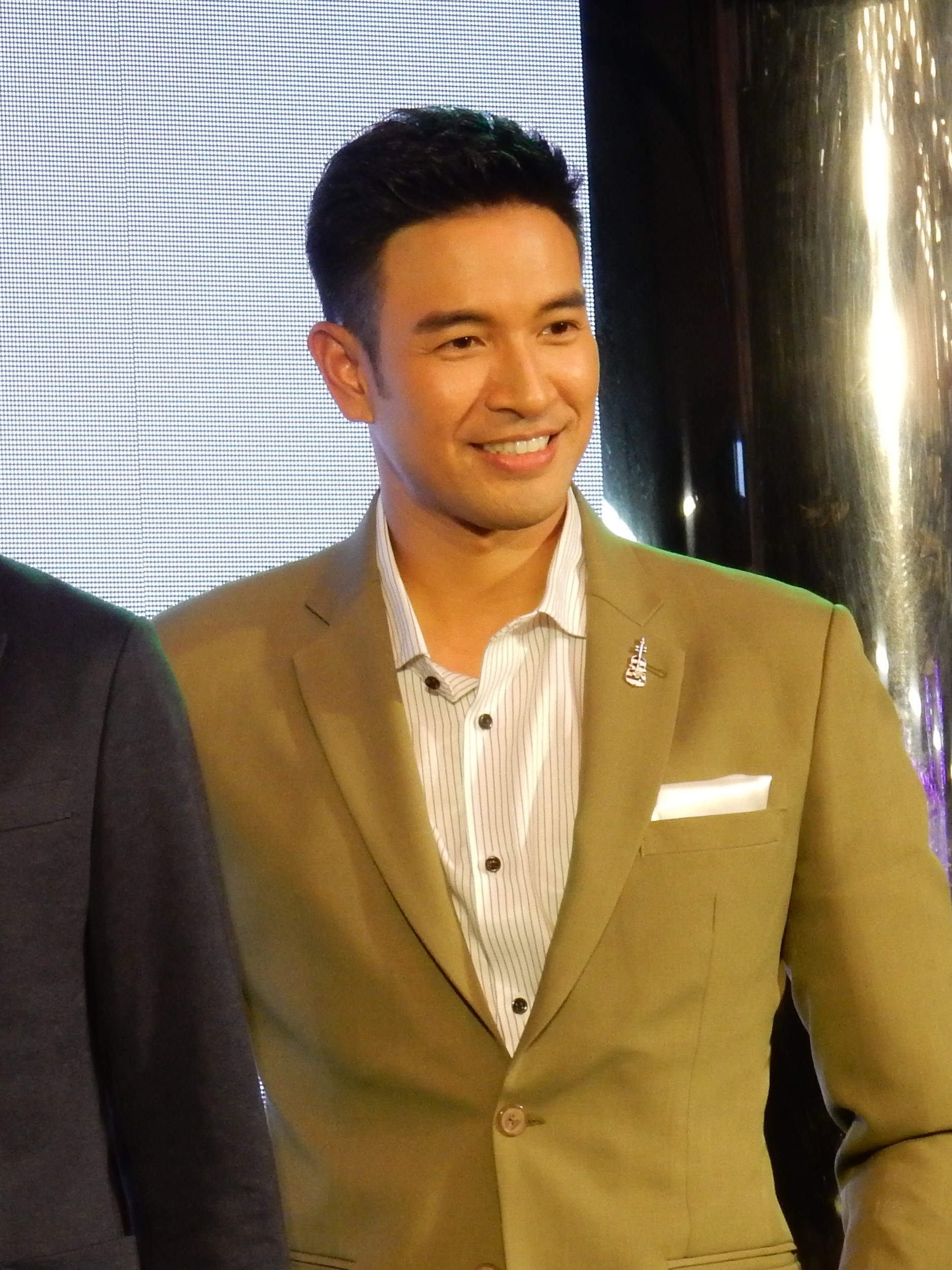
- Born: 26 March 1985 (age 41); Phetchabun Province, Thailand
- Other name: Great (เกรท)
- Education: Rangsit University
- Occupations: Actor; model
- Years active: 2008–present
- Agent: Channel 3 (2008–present)
- Notable work: Khun Chai Taratorn (2013) – M.R. Taratorn Juthathep

Warintorn Panhakarn (Thai: วรินทร ปัญหกาญจน์ or nicknamed Great (เกรท) is a Thai actor and model. He is best known for his roles in the television dramas such as The Sixth Sense (2012) and Khun Chai Taratorn (2013).

== Early life ==
Warintorn Panhakan was born at Lom Sak Hospital, Lom Sak District, Phetchabun Province. He is the eldest child in a family of three. He has 1 sister and 1 younger brother, Chayaphol Panhakarn is a singer for being a contestant on the KPN Awards. His father served as a police officer. As for his mother, she runs a gold shop. Warintorn graduated from high school at Princess Chulabhorn Science High School Lopburi. He holds a bachelor's degree from the Faculty of Fine Arts (now the Faculty of Art and Design) in Interior Design at Rangsit University.

== Career ==
Warintorn entered the entertainment industry by participating in the project to find "Jadet". After the project ended, he received many advertisements. Then he joined the Guy's Challenge project, making himself more well known in Thailand. In 2008, he made his acting debut in the drama Ruk Ter Yord Ruk, in which he played a villain character. In 2009, he played the leading role in a TV drama Sai Sueb Delivery with Yard Yardthip. Warintorn is best known for playing the role of Khun Chai Taratorn in the 2013 drama series Suphapburut Juthathep.

== Filmography ==
=== Television ===
Year	English title	Native title	Role	Notes	Network
2008	Ruk Ter Yord Ruk	รักเธอยอดรัก	Sakon	Support Role	Channel 3
2009	Sai Sueb Delivery	สายสืบดิลิเวอรี่	Cholatee Maikaew	Main Role	Channel 3
2009	Fai Chon Saeng	ไฟโชนแสง	Chakchai / Chak	Main Role	Channel 3
2010	Johng Kol Khing Tian	จงกลกลิ่นเทียน	Son	Main Role	Channel 3
2010	Pleng Ruk Rim Khob Fah	เพลงรักริมขอบฟ้า	Ben	Main Role	Channel 3
2011	Kularb Rai Glai Ruk	กุหลาบร้ายกลายรัก	Chonchanok (Chon)	Main Role	Channel 3
2011	Likit Sanae Ha	ลิขิตเสน่หา	Sutyot / "Yot"	Main Role	Channel 3
2012	Leh Roy Ruk	เล่ห์ร้อยรัก	Thawin	Main Role	Channel 3
2012	The Sixth Sense	The Sixth Sense สื่อรักสัมผัสหัวใจ	Trairanta Thammavat	Main Role	Channel 3
2013	Suphapburut Juthathep; Khun Chai Taratorn	สุภาพบุรุษจุฑาเทพ คุณชายธราธร	M.R. Taratorn Juthathep / Khun Chai Yai	Main Role	Channel 3
2013	Khun Chai Pawornruj	คุณชายปวรรุจ	M.R. Taratorn Juthathep / Khun Chai Yai	Support Role	Channel 3
2013	Khun Chai Puttipat	คุณชายพุฒิภัทร	M.R. Taratorn Juthathep / Khun Chai Yai	Support Role	Channel 3
2013	Khun Chai Rachanon	คุณชายรัชชานนท์	M.R. Taratorn Juthathep / Khun Chai Yai	Support Role	Channel 3
2013	Khun Chai Ronapee	คุณชายรณพีร์	M.R. Taratorn Juthathep / Khun Chai Yai	Support Role	Channel 3
2013	The Sixth Sense 2	The Sixth Sense สื่อรักสัมผัสหัวใจ 2	Trairanta Thammavat	Main Role	Channel 3
2013	Samee	สามี	Rab Limwattanathawornkul	Main Role	Channel 3
2014	Ruk Tong Oom	รักต้องอุ้ม	Sipadun	Main Role	Channel 3
2015	Tai Ngao Jan	ใต้เงาจันทร์	Satayu	Main Role	Channel 3
2015	Kor Pen Jaosao Suk Krung Hai Cheun Jai	ขอเป็นเจ้าสาวสักครั้งให้ชื่นใจ	Poon	Main Role	Channel 3
2016	Nang Eye	นางอาย	Thanathip	Main Role	Channel 3
2016	Kon La Kop Fah	คนละขอบฟ้า	Chinapat	Main Role	Channel 3
2018	My Hero Series; Matuphoom Haeng Huachai	My Hero วีรบุรุษสุดที่รัก มาตุภูมิแห่งหัวใจ	Patsakorn Wirayakan	Guest Role	Channel 3
2018	Montra Lai Hong	มนตราลายหงส์	Patsakorn Wirayakan	Main Role	Channel 3
2018	Lom Phrai Pook Rak	ลมไพรผูกรัก	Patsakorn Wirayakan	Guest Role	Channel 3
2018	Sen Son Kon Rak	เส้นสนกลรัก	Patsakorn Wirayakan	Guest Role	Channel 3
2018	Tai Peek Pak Sa	ใต้ปีกปักษา	Patsakorn Wirayakan	Guest Role	Channel 3
2018	Anguished Love	ปี่แก้วนางหงส์	Niraj / Willit	Main Role	Channel 3
2019	Lub Luang Jai	ลับลวงใจ	Patcharapol Wongwankruea	Main Role	Channel 3
2019	Kao Waan Hai Noo Pen Sai Lub	เขาวานให้หนูเป็นสายลับ	Danurut Sangkhaphat/Rut	Main Role	Channel 3
2021	Dao Kon La Duang	ดาวคนละดวง	Thanat	Main Role	Channel 3
2022	My Sweet Assassin	เพชรฆาตจันทร์เจ้า	Atiruj Boriboonsinsub (Ruj)	Main Role	Channel 3
2022	Poisonous Passion	ปมเสน่หา	Payu	Main Role	Channel 3
2023	Love Destiny 2	พรหมลิขิต	King Thai Sa	Main Role	Channel 3
2024	The Invincible	มือปราบมหาอุตม์	Krathing / Santi	Main Role	Channel 3

== MC ==
Television

- 2012 : Thailand's Most Famous ขวัญใจไทยแลนด์ (Judge)
- 2014 : The Angel นางฟ้าติดปีก (Judge)

Online

- 2018 : Khon Dee Tee Nhai On Air YouTube:KhonDeeTeeNhai Official With Premmanat Suwannanon, Pakorn Chatborirak, Teeradetch Metawarayut, Jirayu Tangsrisuk
- 2020 : Great Talk : On Air YouTube::Great Man Can Do (MC)
