= Lom Phrai Pook Rak =

- ลมไพรผูกรัก
- Genre: Drama; Romance
- Created by: Cholumpi Production Company Limited
- Written by: Uthiya; Pranpramun
- Directed by: Trakun Arunsawat
- Starring: Jaron Sorat; Nuttanicha Dungwattanawanich; Thanakorn Poshayananda; Kiatkamol Lata
- Country of origin: Thailand
- Original language: Thai
- No. of episodes: 7

Production
- Producers: Suangsuda Cholumpi; Chunlawut Cholumpi
- Production location: Thailand
- Running time: 150 minutes

Original release
- Network: Channel 3
- Release: June 30 – July 14, 2018

Related
- Matuphoom Haeng Huachai (2018); Mon Tra Lai Hong (2018); Sen Son Kon Rak (2018); Tai Peek Pak Sa; (2018)

Lom Phrai Pook Rak (Thai: ลมไพรผูกรัก; RTGS: Lom Phrai Phuk Rak) was a Thai romantic-drama TV series that aired on Channel 3, it starred Jaron Sorat, Nuttanicha Dungwattanawanich, Thanakorn Poshyananda and Kiatkamol Lata. It's the third drama of project "My hero".

== Plot ==
Itsara Ratchaphonkun (Jaron Sorat) is a forestry officer. Due to his duties, he had to separate from his wife.

== Cast ==
=== Main cast ===
- Jaron Sorat as Itsara Ratchaphonkun
- Nuttanicha Dungwattanawanich as Pin Phopatin (Pond)
- Thanakorn Poshyananda as Head officer Panat Chatphitak
- Kiatkamol Lata as MP Kraison

=== Supporting cast ===
- Sorawit Suboon as Dr. Chat
- Prappadon Suwanbang as That
- Ronadech Wongsaroj as Konchit
- Hansa Chuengwiwatthanawong as Ke
- Nalin Hohler as Pum
- Oak Keerati as Khana Nontan
- Vichayut Limratanamongkol as Piyawat Mettawong (Pik)
- Suphachai Suwanon as Arm
- Kantapat Permpoonpatcharasuk as Oom
- Nipaporn Thititanakarn as Jane

=== Guests ===
- Sinjai Plengpanich as Teacher Chanthra
- Pakorn Chatborirak as Major Techat Wasutraphaisan (Ben)
- Warintorn Panhakarn as Teacher Patsakorn Wirayakan (Pat)
- Pongsakorn Mettarikanon as Khong Thamdee
- Louis Scott as Akhin Nopprasit
- Duanghathai Sathathip as Nid
