= Captive Heart (Thai TV series) =

- Written by: Khram
- Screenplay by: Nantawan Rungwongphanit
- Directed by: Somching Srisuphap
- Starring: Nadech Kugimiya; Rinrada Kaewbuasai
- Country of origin: Thailand
- Original language: Thai

Production
- Executive producer: Somching Srisuphap
- Running time: 75 minutes
- Production company: Good Feeling

Original release
- Network: Channel 3 HD
- Release: June 19, 2025

Captive Heart (Thai: ใจขังเจ้า) it is a Thai period romantic fantasy drama produced by Good Feeling Productions, directed by Somching Srisuphap, based on the novel by Khram. Written by Nantawan Rungwongphanit, starring Nadech Kugimiya and Rinrada Kaewbuasai. Aired on Channel 3 HD every Wednesday and Thursday at 8:30 p.m. (Thai Standard Time)

== Production ==
On Tuesday, June 27, 2023, photos of the lead clothes fitting were revealed.

In addition, on Wednesday, July 5, 2023, Nadech and Rinrada also had to take additional horseback riding lessons to create realism during filming. And Nadech also had to go to fencing lessons with two other actors, Peerakrit Pacharabunyakiat and Natanich Pradisatarn. The actors then read the script with Somching, and the first filming began on Wednesday, July 26, 2023.

The filming officially wrapped up at the end of May 2024.

== Cast ==
=== Main ===
- Nadech Kugimiya (Barry) as Phansaeng / Khun Saengphlan / Khun Suriyonhatsadi
- Rinrada Kaewbuasai (Pie) as Chawala
- Suriyon Aroonwattanakul (Deaw) as Luang Bawornthat
- Pitchapa Phanthumchinda (Pear) as Phimphilai
- Kammun Klomkaew (Ball) as Muen Worachai
- Tara Tipa (Boat) as On

=== Supporting cast ===
- Kultheera Yordchang (Unda) as La-o
- Peerakrit Phacharaboonyakiat (Friend) as Ming
- Nirut Saosudchart (Ruti) as Han
- Natthanit Praditthan (Pentaii) as Yong
- Akekarin Runggran (Aof) as Jeim
- Chanidapa Pongsilpipat (Best) as Noi
- Daran Thitakawin (Noon) as Nantha
- Kanuengpim Thanaphitchakorn (Nhim) as Saiyud
- Suchao Pongwilai (Chao) as Thaensinil
- Somchai Kemglad (Tao) as Suea Phrai
- Nai Suksakul (Nai) as Poo Jao Saen Kham
- Kajornsak Rattananissai (Jon) as Prince Kaewkarop
- Khwanruedi Klomklom (Khwan) as
- Jaturong Kolimart (X) as Prince Amongosee
- Pitisak Yaowananon (Tae) as Prince Singhanarong / Lord Singh
- Kittipol Kesmanee (Pu) as
- Surasak Chaiat (Nu) as
- Passin Reungwoot (A) as Prince Thammanad
- Thanayong Wongtrakul (Kradum) as Prince Nakonborirak
- Chakapan Chan-O (Jack) as Cha
- Panithi Krausoponpong (Pom) as Ngiam
- Phooripun Kruthirun (Phoo) as Thian
- Kanut Rojanai (Baan) as Thong
- Gandhi Wasuwitchayagit (Gan) as
- Siqaphat Setthapongpat (Book) as Khun Pakdee
- Namnung Suttidachanai (Namnung) as Phao
- Duangjai Hiransri (Phiao) as Mae Cham

=== Guest appearances ===
- Athiwad Sanidwong Na Ayoodthayaa (Ton) as Yom
- Athichanan Srisevok (Ice) as
- Supranee Charoenpol (Kai) as Jiw
- Phutharit Prombandal (Wit) as Thong
- Phanudet Watnasuchart (Duke) as
- Prissana Klampinij (Poo) as
- Surint Karawoot (Woot) as Muen Arak
- Sirinrat Vidhyaphum (Mook) as Bua
- Kantiphat Nakhpan (Phat) as Choung
- Chanitcha Pimthong (Maya) as Niam
- Noraphat Thitakawin (Mai) as
- Napaphat Thitakawin (Mook) as
