= Don't Come Home =

Don't Come Home may refer to:

- Don't Come Home, a Knuckle Puck album
- Don't Come Home (TV series), a Thai-based Netflix horror series
