= Montra Lai Hong =

- มนตราลายหงส์
- Genre: Drama; Romance
- Created by: Chonlumpi Brothers Company Limited
- Written by: Satarat; Plaiseet
- Directed by: Chatchai Naksuriya, Nathapong Wongkawiphairot
- Starring: Warintorn Panhakarn; Maneerat Sricharoon; Natthaweeranuch Thongmee; Anuchit Sapanpong
- Country of origin: Thailand
- Original language: Thai
- No. of episodes: 7

Production
- Producers: Suangsuda Cholumpi; Chunlawut Cholumpi
- Production location: Thailand
- Running time: 150 minutes

Original release
- Network: Channel 3
- Release: June 15 – June 29, 2018

Related
- Matuphoom Haeng Huachai (2018); Lom Phrai Pook Rak (2018); Sen Son Kon Rak (2018); Tai Peek Pak Sa; (2018)

Montra Lai Hong (Thai: มนตราลายหงส์) is a Thai romantic-drama TV series that aired on Channel 3. It starred Warintorn Panhakarn, Maneerat Sricharoon, Natthaweeranuch Thongmee and Anuchit Sapanpong. It's the second drama of project "My hero".

== Plot ==
Patsakorn's father was a dance teacher and the owner of a school for poor children but he died since Patsakorn (Warintorn Panhakarn) was very young. Patsakorn inherited his father's talent and decided to open a dance school. There was an explosion at the opening and, as a result, his adoptive parents and his foster sister died. He blamed himself for their deaths and fell into depression.

== Cast ==
=== Main cast ===
- Warintorn Panhakarn as Teacher Patsakorn Wirayakan (Pat)
- Maneerat Sricharoon as Waenploy (Ploy)
- Natthaweeranuch Thongmee as Kwankamon Uthinthep (Khwan)
- Anuchit Sapanpong as Thanat Detsahakun (Te)

=== Supporting cast ===
- Smithi Likhitmaskul as Nirut
- Wanpiya Oamsinnoppakul as Chanthima
- Wirakan Senitantikun as Kunkking
- Kanokchat Manyaton as Chatchai
- Techin Pinchatri as Kuang
- Chatchawan Phetwisit as Na
- Chalit Fuangarom as Waenploy's granddad
- Sattha Satthathip as Wirot

=== Guests ===
- Sinjai Plengpanich as Teacher Chanthra
- Pakorn Chatborirak as Major Techat Wasutraphaisan (Ben)
- Jaron Sorat as Itsara Ratchaphonkun
- Pongsakorn Mettarikanon as Khong Thamdee
- Louis Scott as Akhin Nopprasit
- Duanghathai Sathathip as Nid
