= Sen Son Kon Rak =

- เส้นสนกลรัก
- Genre: Drama; Romance
- Created by: Cholumpi Brother Company Limited
- Written by: Hatsaban; Plaisee
- Directed by: Kiraki Nakinthanon
- Starring: Pongsakorn Mettarikanon; Kamolned Ruengsri; Pitchapa Phanthumchinda
- Country of origin: Thailand
- Original language: Thai
- No. of episodes: 8

Production
- Producers: Suangsuda Cholumpi; Chunlawut Cholumpi
- Production location: Thailand
- Running time: 150 minutes

Original release
- Network: Channel 3
- Release: July 15 – August 3, 2018

Related
- Matuphoom Haeng Huachai (2018); Mon Tra Lai Hong (2018); Lom Phrai Pook Rak (2018); Tai Peek Pak Sa; (2018)

Sen Son Kon Rak (Thai: เส้นสนกลรัก; RTGS: Sen Son Kon Rak) was a Thai romantic-drama TV series that aired on Channel 3, it starred Pongsakorn Mettarikanon, Kamolned Ruengsri and Pitchapa Phanthumchinda. It's the forth drama of project "My hero".

== Plot ==
Khong Thamdee (Pongsakorn Mettarikanon) who came from broken family became social worker whose purpose in life is to help others. One of latest case is Miao (Kamolned Ruengsri), a broken one.

== Cast ==
=== Main cast ===
- Pongsakorn Mettarikanon as Khong Thamdee
- Kamolned Ruengsri as Montha Phasuk (Miao)
- Pitchapa Phanthumchinda as Thicha

=== Supporting cast ===
- Saranyoo Prachakrit as Peera
- Sawitree Samipak as Rawi
- Pornnapra Theptinnakorn as Thapthim
- Pharunyoo Rojanawuttitham as Chai
- Natha Lloyd as Nari Op-ari
- Jaidee Deedeedee as Surarak Tathip
- Sumet Ong-at as Kamchai Trongsucharit
- Somjit Jongjohor as Sawai
- Kosawis Piyasakulkaew as Pae Panyakraikul
- Kluay Chernyim as Sawat
- Noi Phongam as Jaeo
- Korakot Thanaphat as Phrom
- Rungnapha Benjamaporn as Wan
- Chonlamak Tha Chiangthong as Rai
- Saranthon Klaiudom as Ple
- Suppanad Jittaleela as Nang
- Ronnawee Sereerat as Saen
- Natnischa Cerdchoobuphrakaree as Noina
- Nisawan Silpapearsue as Jiaranai Denwai
- Narongsak Angkap as Dam
- Kanthida Chang as Som

=== Guests ===
- Sinjai Plengpanich as Teacher Chanthra
- Pakorn Chatborirak as Major Techat Wasutraphaisan (Ben)
- Warintorn Panhakarn as Teacher Patsakorn Wirayakan (Pat)
- Jaron Sorat as Itsara Ratchaphonkun
- Louis Scott as Akhin Nopprasit
- Duanghathai Sathathip as Nid
