= Tai Peek Pak Sa =

- ใต้ปีกปักษา
- Genre: Drama; Romantic Comedy; Supernatural
- Written by: Maphason; Thipsuda
- Directed by: Trakun Arunsawat
- Starring: Louis Scott; Tisha Tantiprasut; Worawut Niyomsap
- Country of origin: Thailand
- Original language: Thai
- No. of episodes: 8

Production
- Producers: Suangsuda Cholumpi; Chunlawut Cholumpi
- Production location: Thailand
- Running time: 150 minutes

Original release
- Network: Channel 3
- Release: August 4 – August 19, 2018

Related
- Matuphoom Haeng Huachai (2018); Mon Tra Lai Hong (2018); Lom Phrai Pook Rak (2018); Sen Son Kon Rak (2018)

Tai Peek Pak Sa (Thai: ใต้ปีกปักษา; RTGS: Tai Pik Paksa) was a romantic comedy/drama TV series that aired on Channel 3, it starred Louis Scott, Tisha Tantiprasut and Worawut Niyomsap. It's the fifth drama of project "My hero".

== Plot ==
Akhin Nopprasit (Louis Scott) who's a commercial pilot can connected with a spirit who's once military pilot in Vietnam War.

== Cast ==
=== Main cast ===
- Louis Scott as Akhin Nopprasit
- Tisha Tantiprasut as Sarisa Phongbunyapha (Risa)
- Worawut Niyomsap as Atsani Phakdinarong

=== Supporting cast ===
- Suriyon Aroonwattanakul as Saran
- Rinlanee Sripen as Anongon Siripanya (Anong)
- Vittaya Wasukraipaisan as Santi Phongbunyapha
- Phanudet Watnasuchat as Sarut
- Natwara Wongwasana as Ornipha Phakdinarong (On)
- Kritsiri Suksawat as Wiranut (Wi)
- Pisamai Wilaisak as Aemon Nopprasit
- Duangta Toongkamanee as Sumalee (Nim)
- David Asavanond as Mr. Ferdinand
- Wethaka Siriwatthana as Nut
- Phollawat Manuprasert as Ayut Nopprasit

=== Guests ===
- Sinjai Plengpanich as Teacher Chanthra
- Songsit Roongnophakunsri as Sarath
- Pakorn Chatborirak as Major Techat Wasutraphaisan (Ben)
- Warintorn Panhakarn as Teacher Patsakorn Wirayakan (Pat)
- Jaron Sorat as Itsara Ratchaphonkun
- Pongsakorn Mettarikanon as Khong Thamdee
- Duanghathai Sathathip as Nid
- Benjapol Cheuyaroon as Kitti
