= The Sixth Sense (Thai TV series) =

Thai television series

- Thai: สื่อรักสัมผัสหัวใจ
- Genre: Fantasy
- Based on: The Sixth Sense สื่อรักสัมผัสหัวใจ
- Written by: Nara; Romkaew; Gaotam; Sornklin; Praenut
- Directed by: Trakoon Arunsawas
- Starring: Jittapa Jampathom; Nicharee Chokprachakchat; Kamolned Reungsri; Katherine Morson; Krissiri Sukhsvasti; Louis Scott; Jaron Sorat; Warintorn Panhakarn; Rattaphoom Tokongsup; Thakrit Tawanpong
- Opening theme: "Hidden Power"; Kamolned; Katherine; Krissiri; Warintorn (season 1); "With This Hands"; Karamail (season 2)
- Ending theme: "I Know, I Still Have You"; Jittapa; Nicharee; Kamolned; Katherine; Krissiri (season 1); "My Only Lover"; Rattaphoom (season 2)
- Country of origin: Thailand
- Original language: Thai
- No. of seasons: 2
- No. of episodes: 46

Production
- Executive producer: Nathanont Cholumpi
- Running time: 150 minutes / episode
- Production company: Cholumpi Production

Original release
- Network: ThaiTV3
- Release: September 1, 2012 – July 15, 2013

Related
- Seesun Bun Therng; 3D news

The Sixth Sense (Thai: สื่อรักสัมผัสหัวใจ) is a Thai television series produced by Cholumpi Production, based on the books of the same title. Season 1 aired from September 1 to October 14, 2012, and season 2 aired from September 29 to November 29, 2013.

The series consists of five books each featuring its own story. All five stories are shown in the television series. However, the TV series does not include all of the characters in the books. For example, the two main characters of Kab Dak Rak Luang and Ma Ya Roi Jai portrayed by male leads Jaron Sorat and Rattaphoom Tokongsup, only appear at the beginning of season 2.

== Plot ==
Five girls – Yanin, Kanna, Sukontharot, Kornrampa and Nedsithang, were all born on the same day. They each receive a unique “sixth sense” on their birthday which allows them to communicate with spirits.

== Characters ==
Yanin Vejnarongkul / Nin / Sis Jija The oldest in the group, she communicates with spirits by closing her eyes and meditating. She is amiable and reliable, with a stable mind that is not easily disturbed.

Kanna Piengmongkol / Kan

The second eldest, she always carries headphones because her sixth sense allows her to hear the voices of spirits. She is headstrong, as a result of bullying in her childhood.

Sukontharot / Rot

The third of the group, she is the most skilled in spiritual matters because of what she has learned from her uncle, who is a monk. She can detect a spirit's odor, so she always uses a mask to cover her nose.

Kornrampa Saknanthavee / Kam

The fourth girl possesses self-confidence as a result of her birth into a wealthy family. She always wears gloves, even in hot weather, because whenever she touches something with her bare hands, she can see the past of the thing she is touching.

Nedsithang Martthongkham / Ned

The youngest of the group, she can see spirits and as a consequence always wears sunglasses. She is somewhat naïve because her family, especially her older brother, are overprotective. As a result, she often desires to do things by herself.

Tinn An unskilled Thai speaker who was previously living in Kanchanaburi province. He came back to Thailand to manage a resort he inherited from his maternal grandfather. He becomes disturbed by an unknown spirit.

Phong-in Na Viangthub / Joh

The younger brother of Pim-on, who wants to learn the truth behind her mysterious death. He hires Kanna, someone he has known since childhood, to help, but she believes that he is one of the bullies.

Trirat Thammawat / Tri / Tide The son of a Chinese real estate family that owns the problematic market. He comes off as an uncaring playboy, but actually is just playful and loves his family. The family believes in a shaman whom he strongly opposes, and thus he looks for someone to help him prove their support is misguided.

Park Joon-ji / Junlajak

The grandson of Pimpilart, a wealthy real estate owner. He lives primarily in South Korea, and came to Thailand to make a film. He is disturbed by a spirit, even though he does not believe they are real. He is persuaded by the manager to get rid of it.

Pol.Lt., Dr. Worawat / Dr. Wat A forensic physician who works at the police hospital. He is clever, but not good a good fighter. His image suffers because he loves riding a motorbike, something that is considered to be beneath a doctor.

Pol.Capt. Natthadech Martthongkham / Nat The older, overprotective brother of Nedsithang. There was friction between him and Dr Worawat because both were interested in the same woman.

=== Appearances ===
Characters	Played by	Season	
Characters	Played by	1	2
Yanin	Jittapa Jampathom	Main	Main
Tinn	Louis Scott	Main	Main
Kanna	Nicharee Chokprachakchat	Main	Main
Phong-in	Jaron Sorat	Not appear	Main
Sukontharot	Kamolned Reungsri	Main	Main
Trirat	Warintorn Panhakarn	Main	Main
Kornrampa	Katherine Morson	Main	Main
Park Joon-ji	Rattaphoom Tokongsup	Not appear	Main
Nedsithang	Krissiri Sukhsvasti	Main	Main
Pol.Lt., Dr. Worawat / Dr. Wat	Thakrit Tawanpong	Main	Main
Pol.Capt. Natthadech	Sarawut Martthong	Main	Main
Benja	Sirin Pridiyanont	Not appear	Main
Somkid (shaman) / Robby Kids	Thanakorn Posayanont	Main	Recurring
Ser. Pichaiphakdee / Grandpa	Anan Boonnak	Recurring	Recurring
Aorawan / Aunt	Mayurin Pongpudpan	Recurring	Recurring
Kumarika (Little guardian angel) / Golden Baby	Charlette Wasita Hermenau	Recurring	Recurring
Somchart lawyer	Prakasit Bosuwan	Recurring	Recurring
Phong (village headman)	Santi Santivejchakul	Recurring	Guest
Pol.Maj.Gen. Niyom	Phanudech Watthanasuchart	Guest	Guest
Security guard of Sixth Sense company (spirit)	Chatchai Chamniankul (Ball Chern-yim)	Guest	Guest

== Yarn Sue Rak ==
=== Season 1 ===
Yanin, the oldest in the group, can communicate with spirits by closing her eyes and meditating. She is assigned to take care of Tinn, the owner of a resort in Kanchanaburi province. Tinn faces problems caused by the spirits of her grandfather and her business rival.

==== Main cast ====
- Jittapa Jampathom as Yanin Vejnarongkul / Nin / Sis Jija
- Louis Scott as Tinn
- Nicharee Chokprachakchat as Kanna Piengmongkol / Kan
- Kamolned Reungsri as Sukontharot Thammawat / Rot
- Warintorn Panhakarn as Trirat Thammawat / Tri / Tide
- Katherine Morson as Kornrampa Saknanthavee / Kam
- Krissiri Sukhsvasti as Nedsithang Martthongkham / Ned

==== Supporting cast ====
- Santi Santivejchakul as Phong (village headman)
- Thanakorn Posayanont as Somkid, shaman
- Mayurin Pongpudpan as Aorawan / Aunt Aorawan
- Charlette Wasita Hermenau as Kumarika, little guardian angel / Golden Baby
- Anan Boonnak as Ser. Pichaiphakdee / Grandpa
- Sitang Poonnaphop as Pennapha / Penny
- Thanayong Wongtrakul as Piyaphan, father of Penny and Prem
- Sinatchai Koosakultham as Prem
- Prakasit Bosuwan as Somchart, lawyer

==== Guest cast ====
- Thakrit Tawanpong as Pol.Lt., Dr. Worawat / Dr. Wat
- Sarawut Martthong as Pol.Capt. Natthadech Martthongkham / Nat, older brother of Nedsithang
- Ratchapol Yamsang as Kongfah / Kong
- Chatchai Chamniankul as Security guard of Sixth Sense company (spirit)

=== Season 2 ===
The main plot of season 2 narrates the events taking place inside Tinn's resort. Benja gets injured in an accident and has amnesia. Tinn and Yanin bring her back to the resort and meet with Mirantee, Tinn's mother, who just came back from abroad. Mirantee does not believe in spirits and is not satisfied with Yanin, believing that she is a scammer.

Later, Benja does everything to gain Tinn and Mirantee's attention, which makes Mirantee love and cheer Tinn. This further developed after the arrival of Robby Kids, a businessman who wants to invest in the resort, but is actually a Somkid shaman.

Benja and Robby attempt to befriend and build Mirantee's trust for their own benefit, so Tinn and Yanin work together to prove the truth to Mirantee about the scammers.

==== Main cast ====
- Jittapa Jampathom as Yanin Vejnarongkul / Nin / Sis Jija
- Louis Scott as Tinn
- Sirin Pridiyanont as Benja
- Nicharee Chokprachakchat as Kanna Piengmongkol / Kan
- Kamolned Reungsri as Sukontharot Thammawat / Rot
- Katherine Morson as Kornrampa Saknanthavee / Kam
- Krissiri Sukhsvasti as Nedsithang Martthongkham / Ned

==== Supporting cast ====
- Jariya Anfone as Mirantee, Tinn's mother
- Thanakorn Posayanont as Somkid, shaman
- Mayurin Pongpudpan as Aorawan / Aunt Aorawan
- Charlette Wasita Hermenau as Kumarika, little guardian angel / Golden Baby
- Anan Boonnak as Ser. Pichaiphakdee / Grandpa
- Korakot Tanaphat as Korakot / Korokodo

==== Guest cast ====
- Warintorn Panhakarn as Trirat Thammawat / Tri / Tide
- Jaron Sorat as Phong-in Na Viangthub / Joh
- Rattaphoom Tokongsup as Park Joon-ji
- Thakrit Tawanpong as Pol.Lt., Dr. Worawat / Dr. Wat
- Sarawut Martthong as Pol.Capt. Natthadech Martthongkham / Nat, older brother of Nedsithang
- Ratchapol Yamsang as Kongfah / Kong
- Chatchai Chamniankul as Security guard of Sixth Sense company (spirit)
- Prakasit Bosuwan as Somchart, lawyer
- Santi Santivejchakul as Phong (village headman)
- Phanudech Watthanasuchart as Pol.Maj.Gen. Niyom, Natthadech and Worawat's boss

== Kab Dak Rak Luang ==
=== Season 2 ===
Kanna, the second girl who can hear the sounds of spirits, has to wear headphones all the time when she is out of the Sixth Sense company. She is assigned to get rid of the woman's spirit that is following Panyuth, which leads her to meet an old friend Joh.

==== Main cast ====
- Nicharee Chokprachakchat as Kanna Piengmongkol / Kan
- Jaron Sorat as Phong-in Na Viangthub / Joh
- Jittapa Jampathom as Yanin Vejnarongkul / Nin / Sis Jija
- Nicharee Chokprachakchat as Kanna Piengmongkol / Kan
- Kamolned Reungsri as Sukontharot Thammawat / Rot
- Katherine Morson as Kornrampa Saknanthavee / Kam
- Krissiri Sukhsvasti as Nedsithang Martthongkham / Ned

==== Supporting cast ====
- Phatsachon Supree as Namneung Pintuwong / Pimploy Innawong
- Anuwat Niwatwong as Dr Panyuth Na Viengthub, Ph.D., the husband of Pim-orn and Phing-in brother-in-law
- Virakarn Seneetantikul as Cheopetch Innawong
- Ratchapol Yamsang as Kongfah / Kong, the younger brother of Kanna
- Nicole Theriault as Pim-orn Na Viengthub, the older sister of Phong-in who has died because of the car accident
- Daraneenuch Pasutanawin as Jarunee, the housemaid of Na Viangthub house and being friend with Pim-orn
- Thakrit Tawanpong as Pol.Lt., Dr. Worawat / Dr. Wat
- Sarawut Martthong as Pol.Capt. Natthadech Martthongkham / Nat, older brother of Nedsithang

==== Guest cast ====
- Louis Scott as Tinn
- Warintorn Panhakarn as Trirat Thammawat / Tri / Tide
- Rattaphoom Tokongsup as Park Joon-ji
- Mayurin Pongpudpan as Aorawan / Aunt Aorawan
- Charlette Wasita Hermenau as Kumarika, little guardian angel / Golden Baby
- Napatthanan Nimjirawat as Kanna (child)
- Chatchai Chamniankul as Security guard of Sixth Sense company (spirit)
- Sirin Pridiyanont as Benja
- Thanakorn Posayanont as Somkid, shaman
- Korakot Tanaphat as Korakot / Korokodo
- Phanudech Watthanasuchart as Pol.Maj.Gen. Niyom, Natthadech and Worawat's boss

== Lae Buang Mon Tra ==
=== Season 1 ===
Sukontharot, the girl who can smell the scents of spirits, is the most skilled in spiritual matters because her uncle is a monk. She has to deal with the problems of Trirat's family going astray with a shaman, Somkid's doctrine.

==== Main cast ====
- Kamolned Reungsri as Sukontharot Thammawat / Rot
- Warintorn Panhakarn as Trirat Thammawat / Tri / Tide
- Jittapa Jampathom as Yanin Vejnarongkul / Nin / Sis Jija
- Nicharee Chokprachakchat as Kanna Piengmongkol / Kan
- Katherine Morson as Kornrampa Saknanthavee / Kam
- Krissiri Sukhsvasti as Nedsithang Martthongkham / Ned

==== Supporting cast ====
- Thanakorn Posayanont as Somkid, shaman
- Anusorn Dechapanya as Mr. Jamrern Thammawat, the father of Trirat, a millionaire and an owner of Ying Jamrern market
- Duangta Tungkamanee as Mrs. Ying Thammawat, Trirat's mother
- Sineenart Potives as Amah, the grandmother of Trirat
- Toon Hiranyasap as Sukontharot's father
- Chudapha Chantakhet as Sukontharot's mother
- Darun Thitakawin as Saowapha, Trirat's aunt
- Natalie Devis as Kethy
- Supranee Charernpol as Thip, the mother of Kethy

==== Guest cast ====
- Louis Scott as Tinn
- Thakrit Tawanpong as Pol.Lt., Dr. Worawat / Dr. Wat
- Sarawut Martthong as Pol.Capt. Natthadech Martthongkham / Nat, older brother of Nedsithang
- Rattaphoom Tokongsup as Park Joon-ji
- Mayurin Pongpudpan as Aorawan / Aunt Aorawan
- Charlette Wasita Hermenau as Kumarika, little guardian angel / Golden Baby
- Ratchapol Yamsang as Kongfah / Kong
- Chatchai Chamniankul as Security guard of Sixth Sense company (spirit)
- Fanden Janyathanakorn as Somkid's henchman
- Phanudech Watthanasuchart as Pol.Maj.Gen. Niyom, Natthadech and Worawat's boss

=== Season 2 ===
Sukontharot and Trirat become a couple and have moved to live in the same house, but it is occupied by a child spirit who is always angry and cries in the mysterious room. She is Trirat's younger sister, Botun, who died in the accident but has something that she is still worried about, so Sukontharot has to find what Botun wanted.

==== Main cast ====
- Kamolned Reungsri as Sukontharot Thammawat / Rot
- Warintorn Panhakarn as Trirat Thammawat / Tri / Tide
- Jittapa Jampathom as Yanin Vejnarongkul / Nin / Sis Jija
- Nicharee Chokprachakchat as Kanna Piengmongkol / Kan
- Katherine Morson as Kornrampa Saknanthavee / Kam
- Krissiri Sukhsvasti as Nedsithang Martthongkham / Ned
- Shinaradee Anupongphichart as Botun Thammawat

==== Supporting cast ====
- Charlette Wasita Hermenau as Kumarika, little guardian angel / Golden Baby
- Anusorn Dechapanya as Mr. Jamrern Thammawat, the father of Trirat, a millionaire and an owner of Ying Jamrern market
- Duangta Tungkamanee as Mrs. Ying Thammawat, Trirat's mother
- Sineenart Potives as Amah, the grandmother of Trirat
- Toon Hiranyasap as Sukontharot's father
- Chudapha Chantakhet as Sukontharot's mother
- Darun Thitakawin as Saowapha, Trirat's aunt

==== Guest cast ====
- Natalie Devis as Kethy
- Supranee Charernpol as Thip, the mother of Kethy
- Louis Scott as Tinn
- Jaron Sorat as Phong-in Na Viangthub / Joh
- Rattaphoom Tokongsup as Park Joon-ji
- Thakrit Tawanpong as Pol.Lt., Dr. Worawat / Dr. Wat
- Sarawut Martthong as Pol.Capt. Natthadech Martthongkham / Nat, older brother of Nedsithang
- Mayurin Pongpudpan as Aorawan / Aunt Aorawan
- Ratchapol Yamsang as Kongfah / Kong
- Chatchai Chamniankul as Security guard of Sixth Sense company (spirit)
- Sirin Pridiyanont as Benja
- Thanakorn Posayanont as Somkid, shaman
- Korakot Tanaphat as Korakot / Korokodo
- Phanudech Watthanasuchart as Pol.Maj.Gen. Niyom, Natthadech and Worawat's boss

== Ma Ya Roi Jai ==
=== Season 2 ===
Kornrampa is the rich man's daughter who always wears gloves because she can see the past of anything she touches. She is a big fan of Park Joon-ji, a Thai-born Korean actor who does not believe in spirits. One day, he visits Thailand for a drama shooting, only to find that his only grandmother Pimpilart mysteriously died. He felt that his grandmother's spirit was around him, o he decided to be a customer of the Sixth Sense company and solve the mystery.

==== Main cast ====
- Katherine Morson as Kornrampa Saknanthavee / Kam
- Rattaphoom Tokongsup as Park Joon-ji / Junlajak
- Jittapa Jampathom as Yanin Vejnarongkul / Nin / Sis Jija
- Nicharee Chokprachakchat as Kanna Piengmongkol / Kan
- Kamolned Reungsri as Sukontharot Thammawat / Rot
- Krissiri Sukhsvasti as Nedsithang Martthongkham / Ned

==== Supporting cast ====
- Tharika Tidathip as Pimpilart
- Kawinrat Yosamornsuntorn as Lee Jung-kook, Joon-ji's manager
- Charlette Wasita Hermenau as Kumarika, little guardian angel / Golden Baby / Aorawee's twin
- Apinan Prasertwatthanakul as Atithep
- Sommart Praihirun as Somchai, Pimpilart's lawyer
- Nitchaphan Chunhawongwasu as Aorawee / Orn
- Primrata Dech-udom as Parichat / Poey, an actress who has a crush on Joon-ji
- Thassapak Hsu as Kim Sung-soo, an actor

==== Guest cast ====
- Louis Scott as Tinn
- Jaron Sorat as Phong-in Na Viangthub / Joh
- Warintorn Panhakarn as Trirat Thammawat / Tri / Tide
- Thakrit Tawanpong as Pol.Lt., Dr. Worawat / Dr. Wat
- Sarawut Martthong as Pol.Capt. Natthadech Martthongkham / Nat, older brother of Nedsithang
- Mayurin Pongpudpan as Aorawan / Aunt Aorawan
- Ratchapol Yamsang as Kongfah / Kong
- Chatchai Chamniankul as Security guard of Sixth Sense company (spirit)
- Sirin Pridiyanont as Benja
- Thanakorn Posayanont as Somkid, shaman
- Korakot Tanaphat as Korakot / Korokodo
- Phanudech Watthanasuchart as Pol.Maj.Gen. Niyom, Natthadech and Worawat's boss

== Pleao Fai Nai Sai Lom ==
=== Season 1 ===
Nedsithang is the most prim, naive and fearful among the five. She can see spirits, so she always wears sunglasses in public. Furthermore, she is protected by her brother, Natthadech. He initially dislikes Worawat, the forensic technician, because he thinks that Worawat had taken his girlfriend away. However, all three have to work together for find the truth behind Baimon, the musical actress' death.

==== Main cast ====
- Krissiri Sukhsvasti as Nedsithang Martthongkham / Ned
- Thakrit Tawanpong as Pol.Lt., Dr. Worawat / Dr. Wat
- Sarawut Martthong as Pol.Capt. Natthadech Martthongkham / Nat, older brother of Nedsithang
- Jittapa Jampathom as Yanin Vejnarongkul / Nin / Sis Jija
- Nicharee Chokprachakchat as Kanna Piengmongkol / Kan
- Kamolned Reungsri as Sukontharot Thammawat / Rot
- Katherine Morson as Kornrampa Saknanthavee / Kam

==== Supporting cast ====
- Rhatha Phongam as Monlada / Baimon / Wayo
- Penpetch Penkul as Dr. Ruth
- Sarawut Phoomthong as Larp, Ruth's servant
- Chokchai Charoensook as Panut, Baimon's lover
- Setthinan Kanikajiranun as Ornjira
- Morris K as Kanin, Baimon's co-worker
- Jojo Louis Myocchi as Mario, Baimon's co-worker
- Peter Louis Myocchi as Angelo, Baimon's co-worker

==== Guest cast ====
- Ammaraphat Watthanakul as Suphitcha / Peach
- Phanudech Watthanasuchart as Pol.Maj.Gen. Niyom, Natthadech and Worawat's boss
- Louis Scott as Tinn
- Warintorn Panhakarn as Trirat Thammawat / Tri / Tide
- Mayurin Pongpudpan as Aorawan / Aunt Aorawan
- Ratchapol Yamsang as Kongfah / Kong
- Chatchai Chamniankul as Security guard of Sixth Sense company (spirit)
- Thanakorn Posayanont as Somkid, shaman
- Fanden Janyathanakorn as Somkid's henchman

=== Season 2 ===
Suphitcha, Natthadech's ex-girlfriend returns to be involved in his life. She makes him believe that she loves him but in reality, she does everything to reconcile with Worawat. When things do not turn out the way she wanted, she decides to cooperate with Benja to get rid of Nedsithang, Worawat's lover, instead.

==== Main cast ====
- Krissiri Sukhsvasti as Nedsithang Martthongkham / Ned
- Thakrit Tawanpong as Pol.Lt., Dr. Worawat / Dr. Wat
- Sarawut Martthong as Pol.Capt. Natthadech Martthongkham / Nat, older brother of Nedsithang
- Ammaraphat Watthanakul as Suphitcha / Peach
- Jittapa Jampathom as Yanin Vejnarongkul / Nin / Sis Jija
- Nicharee Chokprachakchat as Kanna Piengmongkol / Kan
- Kamolned Reungsri as Sukontharot Thammawat / Rot
- Katherine Morson as Kornrampa Saknanthavee / Kam

==== Supporting cast ====
- Louis Scott as Tinn
- Jaron Sorat as Phong-in Na Viangthub / Joh
- Warintorn Panhakarn as Trirat Thammawat / Tri / Tide
- Rattaphoom Tokongsup as Park Joon-ji / Junlajak
- Phanudech Watthanasuchart as Pol.Maj.Gen. Niyom, Natthadech and Worawat's boss
- Sirin Pridiyanont as Benja
- Thanakorn Posayanont as Somkid, shaman
- Korakot Tanaphat as Korakot / Korokodo

==== Guest cast ====
- Mayurin Pongpudpan as Aorawan / Aunt Aorawan
- Ratchapol Yamsang as Kongfah / Kong
- Chatchai Chamniankul as Security guard of Sixth Sense company (spirit)
- Sarawut Phoomthong as Larp (spirit)

== Original soundtrack ==
=== Season 1 ===
No.	Title	Lyrics	Music	Artist(s)	Length
1.	"Hidden Power" (Thai: พลังที่ซ่อนอยู่)	Trai Phumirattana	M.L. Bawornchai Sukhsvasti	Kamolned; Katherine; Krissiri; Warintorn	3:50
2.	"I know, I still have you" (Thai: ฉันรู้ว่ายังมีเธอ)	Trai Phumirattana	M.L. Bawornchai Sukhsvasti	Jittapa; Nicharee; Kamolned; Katherine; Krissiri	3:32
3.	"Leading dream" (Thai: ฝันนำทาง)	Thanakrit Panichwid	Asira Wongseng	Jittapa; Nicharee; Kamolned; Katherine; Krissiri	3:50
4.	"Uncertain" (Thai: หวั่นไหว)	Thanakrit Panichwid	Asira Wongseng	Jittapa Jampathom	3:46
Total length:					14:58

Butterfly Wing The Musical OST
No.	Title	Lyrics	Music	Artist(s)	Length
1.	"Montage"	Wishian Tantiphimonphan	Wishian Tantiphimonphan	Peter Louis Myocchi; Setthinan Kanikajiranun	–
2.	"No real love" (Thai: รักแท้ไม่มีจริง)	Wishian Tantiphimonphan	Wishian Tantiphimonphan	Rhatha Phongam	4:35
Total length:					–

=== Season 2 ===
No.	Title	Lyrics	Music	Artist(s)	Length
1.	"With this hands" (Thai: ด้วยมือคู่นี้)	Sutthipong Sombatjinda	Tong Karamail	Karamail	3:57
2.	"My only lover" (Thai: ที่รักของฉันคนเดียว)	Yodsaphan Ananphittayanont	Yodsaphan Ananphittayanont	Natthapon Wongsanit	4:58
3.	"Power of heart" (Thai: พลังของหัวใจ)	Hanameroro Music Production	Hanameroro Music Production	Warintorn; Jaron; Rattaphoom; Thakrit; Sarawut	4:06
4.	"Float" (Thai: ล่องลอย)	Hanameroro Music Production	Hanameroro Music Production	Nicole Theriault	–
5.	"Hearing things" (Thai: หูแว่ว)	Wanchai	Wanchai	Ratchapol Yamsang	3:35
6.	"Try"	Nuttaporn Thammati	Hanameroro Music Production	Park Joon-ji (Rattaphoom Tokongsup)	–
7.	"Hidden Power" (Thai: พลังที่ซ่อนอยู่)	Trai Phumirattana	M.L. Bawornchai Sukhsvasti	Kamolned; Katherine; Krissiri; Warintorn	3:50
8.	"Leading dream" (Thai: ฝันนำทาง)	Thanakrit Panichwid	Asira Wongseng	Jittapa; Nicharee; Kamolned; Katherine; Krissiri	3:50
9.	"I know, I still have you" (Thai: ฉันรู้ว่ายังมีเธอ)	Trai Phumirattana	M.L. Bawornchai Sukhsvasti	Jittapa; Nicharee; Kamolned; Katherine; Krissiri	3:32
10.	"Uncertain" (Thai: หวั่นไหว)	Thanakrit Panichwid	Asira Wongseng	Jittapa Jampathom	3:46
Total length:					–
