= Krung Diew Kor Kern Por =

- Directed by: Manop Udomdej
- Written by: Manop Udomdej
- Starring: Sinjai Hongthai; Likit Eakmongkol; Apichat Halamjiak; Somsak Chaisongkram
- Release date: 1988
- Country: Thailand
- Language: Thai

Krung Diew Kor Kern Por (Thai: ครั้งเดียวก็เกินพอ, RTGS: Khrang Diao Ko Koen Pho) is a 1988 Thai romantic-drama film directed by Manop Udomdej. The film portrays an unhappy love affair and is an attempt to draw the attention of the people to the women's position in Thailand, especially their difficulties of proving a rape and aborting. The movie received four gold statuette awards (รางวัลตุ๊กตาทอง) in 1987.
