= Deathwave =

- Directed by: Toranong Srichua
- Written by: Toranong Srichua
- Produced by: Toranong Srichua
- Starring: Panudej Wattanasuchart; Suchao Pongwilai; Pisarn Srimunkhong; Sirinda Jensen; Nichapa Prakornkitwattana
- Cinematography: Sarayut Sattayaporn
- Edited by: Manop Janjarasskul
- Music by: Thippataj Pirompak
- Production company: Toranong Studio
- Distributed by: 20^{th}June Entertainment
- Release date: May 28, 2009; (postponed from April 30)
- Running time: 130 minutes
- Country: Thailand
- Languages: Thai; Southern Thai
- Budget: 160 million baht
- Box office: 5,000,000 baht

Deathwave or 2022 Tsunami (Thai: 2022 สึนามิ วันโลกสังหาร) is a 2009 Thai disaster film directed by Toranong Srichua.

== Synopsis ==
In 2022, the Thai government is led by Prime Minister Traipop, a young politician who is considerate of public interests over political. 18 years after the 2004 tsunami, Traipop's administration sets up a national disaster alarm centre; Dr. Siam is its director, while the staff consists entirely of young people.

Dr. Siam tries to warn Traipop that the tsunami might be in the Gulf of Thailand. However, in the end, the tsunami really hits Bangkok on April 13, which falls on Songkran Day.

== Cast ==
- Panudej Wattanasuchart as Traipop Raknaitham
- Suchao Pongwilai as Dr. Siam
- Pisarn Srimunkhong as Phuket
- Sirinda Jensen as Cindy
- Nichapa Prakornkitwattana as Phi Phi
- Chalit Fiangarom as Somchart
- Prinya Wongsilp as Rawai
- Chumphorn Thepphithak as Ke the Old Man
- Thanayong Wongtrakun as Chartrat
- Manop Asawatap as SEAFDEC Commander

== Production and reception ==
Deathwave was directed, produced and written by Toranong Srichua, a film director famous in the 1980s and 1990s, especially with erotic films. This was his first film in five years after last working on Unhuman in 2004. Srichua explained he made this film to warn the Thai people about disasters that might happen in the near future. It was first Thai film in which the Prime Minister is a main character.

Most of the filming took place at a studio in Amphoe Kaeng Krachan, Phetchaburi province, which Srichua hoped for when it was released, would be popular and he would renovate the studio as a tourist attraction. However, the film struggled with marketing; one billboard promoting the film next to a shophouse on the way to the Hua Lamphong Expressway used actual photos of the 2004 tsunami victims, which was criticized as inappropriate.

Although the movie was hyped as a potential blockbuster disaster film such as Independence Day, The Day After Tomorrow, 2012 or Korean film Haeundae, the release was criticized for its direct-to-video or B movie quality, resulting in a very low turnout. In response to the criticism, Srichua considered organizing activities like fasting on a building's roof to simulate scenarios during a hypothetical tsunami. The events were ultimately not held. Srichua eventually struggled with debt and stress, prompting him to attempt suicide.

== See also ==
- Effect of the 2004 Indian Ocean earthquake on Thailand
