= Sinjai Plengpanich =

Thai actress

- สินจัย เปล่งพานิช
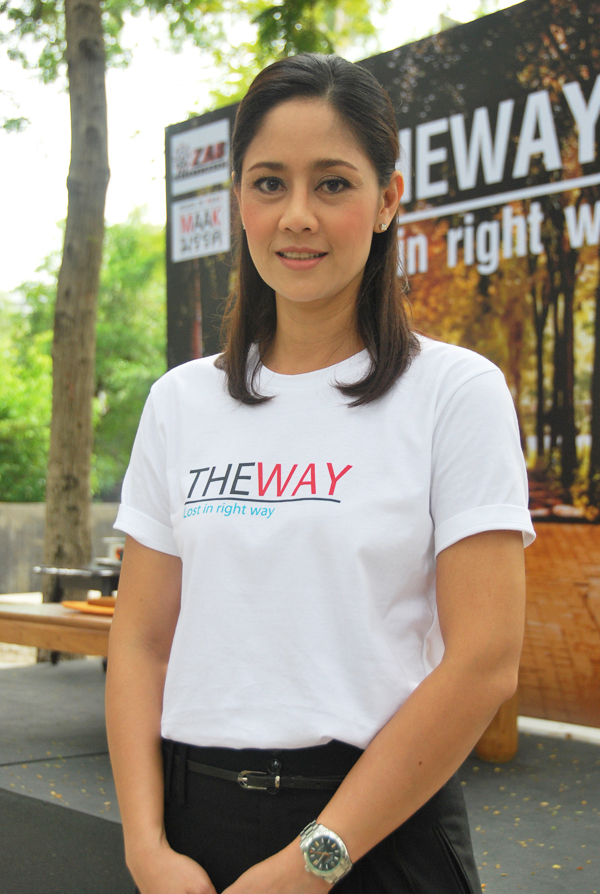
- Born: Sinjai Hongtai (Thai: สินจัย หงษ์ไทย); January 21, 1965 (age 61); Bangkok, Thailand
- Other name: Nok (นก)
- Occupations: Actress; singer; model; MC; show host; stage performer
- Years active: 1981–present
- Known for: Krung Diew Kor Kern Por (1988); The Love of Siam (2007); Talay Rissaya (2007)
- Height: 1.70 m (5 ft 7 in)
- Spouse: Chatchai Plengpanich (m. 1988)
- Children: Sittichoke Plengpanich; Tichakorn Plengpanich; Peeradon Plengpanich

Sinjai Plengpanich (Thai: สินจัย เปล่งพานิช; RTGS: Sinchai Plengphanit; born January 21, 1965), née Sinjai Hongtai (Thai: สินจัย หงษ์ไทย; RTGS: Sinchai Hongthai), is a Thai actress who started her career as a model. She has acted in numerous lakorn (Thai soap operas) as well as films and theatrical productions. In 2007, she starred in the critically acclaimed The Love of Siam, and also acted in a revival of the stage production, Banlangmek: The Musical. In 2013 remake of Khu Kam, Sinjai portrayed Thanphuying La-iat Phibunsongkhram, wife of Field Marshal Plaek Phibunsongkhram, former Prime Minister and military dictator.

She is married to actor Chatchai Plengpanich, and the two share the same nickname, Nok (นก; meaning in Thai: bird). She has 2 sons and a daughter, named Gun, Bom, and Dom.

== Filmography ==
=== Film ===
| Year | Title | Role | Notes | Ref. |
|---|---|---|---|---|
| 1982 | Sai Sawat Yang Mai Sin | Thip | Main role | |
| 1983 | Katanyu Prakasit | N/A | Main role | |
| 1985 | Hong Fah | Hong Fah | Main role | |
| 1985 | Nuanchawee | Nuanchawee Petchrung / Nuanchawee Ratchadet | Main role | |
| 1985 | The Accusation | Phan | Main role | |
| 1986 | Luk Thung Holiday | N/A | Main role | |
| 1986 | Bpai Mai Teung Duang Dao | Hamesuda | Main role | |
| 1986 | Nam Sor Sai | Putkrong Wiboonsin | Main role | |
| 1986 | Sakae Krang | Dawan / Keeyapat | Main role | |
| 1986 | Chang Mun Chun Mai Care | Pimporranee / "Pim" | Main role | |
| 1987 | Fai Nao | N/A | Main role | |
| 1987 | Fai Sorn Cheua | N/A | Main role | |
| 1987 | Chun Ruk Pua Kao | Am | Main role | |
| 1988 | Sor Sam Sai | Kaekai | Main role | |
| 1988 | Wiwa Jum Laeng | Niravipa | Main role | |
| 1988 | Krung Diew Kor Kern Por | Lak | Main role | |
| 1988 | Bangkok Emergency | N/A | Main role | |
| 1988 | Talui Rong Mor | N/A | Main role | |
| 1988 | Pummaree See Thong | Nampeung | Main role | |
| 1990 | Ruk The Tha Huajai Yak Ja Ruk | N/A | Main role | |
| 1990 | Air America | May Ling | Supporting role | |
| 1995 | Mahasajan Hang Rak | Napha | Main role | |
| 1995 | Pocahontas | Pocahontas | Thai dubbing | |
| 1997 | Anda Kub Fahsai | Fahsai's mother | Main role | |
| 2001 | The Legend of Suriyothai | Lady Srichulalak | Guest role | |
| 2007 | The Love of Siam | Sunee (Tong's mother) | Supporting role | |
| 2010 | Who Are You? | Nida (CD retailer) | Main role | |
| 2014 | 3 A.M. 3D: Part 2 | {The Offering} Boss Juju | Main role | |
| 2014 | The Scar | Khun Ying Thongkhampleow | Supporting role | |
| 2016 | Fathers | Ms. Rattiya | Main role | |
| 2019 | Necromancer | May | Supporting role | |
| 2025 | Eternal Bond | Sornklin | Supporting role | |
| 2026 | Inherit | Sudaduang | Supporting role | |

=== Television ===
| Year | Title | Role | Notes | Channel |
|---|---|---|---|---|
| 1985 | Ranad Ek | N/A | Main role | Channel 7 |
| 1988 | Lai Hong | Nueng | Main role | Channel 3 |
| 1989 | Takai Dao | N/A | Guest role | MCOT HD |
| 1989 | Poo Chana Sip Tit | Kusuma | Main role | Channel 3 |
| 1990 | Katanyu Prakasit | Sun Huay | Main role | Channel 3 |
| 1990 | Raeng Ruk | Noodee | Main role | Channel 3 |
| 1992 | Nai Fun | Princess Panpilat | Main role | Channel 3 |
| 1993 | Nam For Sai | Wannaree Prakarnpan | Main role | Channel 7 |
| 1993 | Chang Mun Chun Mai Care | Pim | Main role | Channel 5 |
| 1994 | Peak Marn | Salaila / "Salai" | Main role | Channel 5 |
| 1994 | Lah | Mathusorn / "Sorn" | Main role | Channel 5 |
| 1995 | Romchat | Manward | Main role | Channel 3 |
| 1996 | Darayan | Darayan | Main role | Channel 5 |
| 1997 | Kaew Jom Gaen | Kaew's mother | Main role | Channel 5 |
| 1997 | Roong Sarm Sai | Rong Sai | Main role | Channel 3 |
| 1998 | Bangkert Klao | Suksom | Main role | Channel 3 |
| 1998 | Marnya Rissaya | Piangdao | Main role | Channel 5 |
| 1999 | Rueng Maya | Pachara | Main role | Channel 5 |
| 1999 | Barb Ruk | Kiranan / "Ki" | Main role | Channel 5 |
| 1999 | Lakorn Tertphrakiarati Chut Dtai Saeng Tawan | N/A | Main role | Channel 7 |
| 1999 | Kijagum Chai Sod | Yor Saeng | Main role | Channel 7 |
| 2000 | Muang Maya | Herself | Guest role | Channel 5 |
| 2000 | Pit Kularb | Veerada / "Vee" | Main role | Channel 5 |
| 2001 | Tayard Asoon | Woranart | Main role | Channel 7 |
| 2002 | Nampu | Suwanni Sukhontha | Main role | Channel 7 |
| 2003 | Muang Maya The Series: Maya Pitsawat | Thip Dararat | Main role | Channel 5 |
| 2004 | Langkhaa Dang | Choomsee | Supporting role | Channel 7 |
| 2005 | Mer Wan Fah Plean See | Chan | Main role | Channel 5 |
| 2006 | Sadut Ruk | Pimjun | Supporting role | Channel 3 |
| 2006 | Talay Rissaya | Pawinee | Main role | Channel 5 |
| 2007 | Khun Yay Sai Diew | N/A | Supporting role | Channel 3 |
| 2007 | Klin Kaew Klang Jai | Jitta | Supporting role | Channel 3 |
| 2008 | Kwarm Lub Kaung Superstar | Herself | Guest role | Channel 5 |
| 2009 | Artid Ching Duang | Parnrawee Suriyathid | Supporting role | Channel 5 |
| 2010 | Neur Mek | Napa | Main role | Channel 3 |
| 2011 | Karm Wayla Ha Ruk | Praepim / "Pim" | Main role | Channel 5 |
| 2011 | Tawan Dueat | Wilai | Supporting role | Channel 3 |
| 2012 | Buang Ruk | Angkhana | Main role | Channel 5 |
| 2012 | Nuer Mek 2 | Napha | Supporting role | Channel 3 |
| 2013 | Koo Gum | Wedding Guest | Guest role | Channel 5 |
| 2013 | E-Sa Raweechuangchoti (The Actress) | Consort Prim Raweewarn Na Ayudhya | Supporting role | Channel 5 |
| 2014 | Pope Rak | Thara | Supporting role | Channel 3 |
| 2016 | Sorry, I Love You | Nathai | Supporting role | One 31 |
| 2016 | Chaat Payak | Nang Pian / Khun Thip | Supporting role | Channel 3 |
| 2016 | Patiharn | {Seg 4: Love Never Dies} | Main role | PPTV (Thailand) |
| 2016 | Ruk Tae Mae Mai Pleum | Nittaya / "Nid" | Main role | One 31 |
| 2017 | Sri Ayodhaya | Krom Phra Thepha Mat | Main role | True4U |
| 2018 | My Hero Series; Matuphoom Haeng Huachai | Teacher Jantra | Guest role | Channel 3 |
| 2018 | Montra Lai Hong | Teacher Jantra | Guest role | Channel 3 |
| 2018 | Lom Phrai Pook Rak | Teacher Jantra | Guest role | Channel 3 |
| 2018 | Sen Son Kon Rak | Teacher Jantra | Guest role | Channel 3 |
| 2018 | Tai Peek Pak Sa | Teacher Jantra | Guest role | Channel 3 |
| 2019 | Ruk Jung Aoey | Daojai | Guest role | Channel 3 |
| 2019 | Daai Daeng | Mei Ing | Main role | Channel 3 |
| 2019 | Until We Meet Again | Mrs. Wongnate | Supporting role | LINE TV |
| 2019 | The Stranded | Professor Lin | Main role | Netflix |
| 2019 | Sri Ayodhaya | Krom Phra Thepha Mat | Main role | True4U |
| 2020 | Fak Fah Kiri Dao | Pornrampai | Supporting role | Channel 3 |
| 2021 | Game Lah Torrachon | Phin | Supporting role | Channel 3 |
| 2021 | 55:15 Never Too Late | Jaya | Main role | GMM 25 |
| 2024 | Duangjai Taewaprom | Piangkwan Juthathep Na Ayutthaya | Supporting role | Channel 3 |
| 2024 | Game Rak Patiharn | Rampha Watcharasirikul | Supporting role | One 31 |
| 2024 | MHom Ped Sawan | Her Royal Highness Princess Darawadi | Supporting role | Thai PBS |
| 2025 | Tayat Mai Lek1 | Thara Rapithada | Main role | One 31 |
| 2026 | Ticket to Heaven | Bussaya (Barth's mother) | Supporting role | GMM 25 |

=== Producer ===
| Year | Title | Starring | Channel |
|---|---|---|---|
| 2014 | Pope Rak | Prin Suparat, Ranee Campen | Channel 3 |
| 2017 | Tawan Yor Saeng | Pichukkana Wongsarattanasin, Natthawut Skidjai | Channel 3 |
| 2019 | Ruk Jung Aoey | Natapohn Tameeruks, Chantavit Dhanasevi | Channel 3 |
| 2021 | Game Lah Torrachon | Prin Suparat, Natapohn Tameeruks | Channel 3 |
| 2024 | Duangjai Taewaprom series (Jaiphisut) | Eisaya Hosuwan, Tate Myron | Channel 3 |
