= Mai Charoenpura =

Thai singer and actress (born 1969)

Mai Charoenpura ใหม่ เจริญปุระ
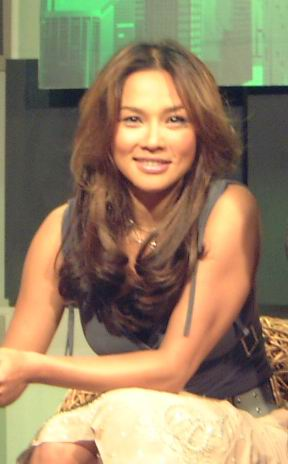
- Charoenpura in 2000

Background information
- Born: Mai Charoenpura; 5 January 1969 (age 57); Bangkok, Thailand
- Genres: Pop; string
- Occupations: Singer; actress
- Years active: 1980s–present
- Label: GMM Grammy

Mai Charoenpura (Thai: ใหม่ เจริญปุระ; born 5 January 1969), formerly known as Mai Siriwimol (Thai: ใหม่ สิริวิมล), is a Thai singer and actress.

== Early life ==
Born in Bangkok, Thailand, Charoenpura is one of four daughters of Thai actor Surin, known by his stage name Ruj Ronnapop, and Winee Sontikool. She has three sisters, including her half sister, actress Intira Charoenpura.

== Career ==
=== Music ===
As a singer, Charoenpura has released several studio albums, music videos and performed in concerts since 1989. In 2007, Charoenpura performed in Manchester, for a concert organized by former Thai prime minister Thaksin Shinawatra, to celebrate his ownership of Manchester City F.C.

=== Acting ===
Since the 1980s, Charoenpura has acted in several Thai television and film productions. As an actress, she's best known for her role as Pring in Khon Rerng Muang (Thai: คนเริงเมือง). She portrayed the role twice in two different made-for-TV remakes consecutively in 1988 and 2002. She came to international attention for her portrayal of the villain Lady Srisudachan in the 2001 film, The Legend of Suriyothai, directed by Chatrichalerm Yukol, and released theatrically in the United States in 2003. In 2010 Charoenpura appeared in the anthology horror film Die a Violent Death, alongside Akara Amarttayakul and Supaksorn Chaimongkol. After a hiatus, she starred in Channel 3 drama Krong Kam as Yoi in 2019.

== Discography ==
=== Studio albums ===
- 1989: Mai Muan
- 1990: Mai Mai Kid Fai
- 1992: Kwam Lup Sud Khob Fah
- 1994: Phee Seua Kab Payu
- 1997: Cheewit Mai
- 1998: Phlaeng Rit
- 2002: Kon Diao Nai Hua Jai
- 2006: Always Mai Sa-Mer

=== Non-album singles ===
- 2010: "Mai Mee Sing Nai" (feat. Tono)
- 2013: "Kho Kae Mee Thoe" (Ost. Sap Phra Pheng)
- 2016: "Rak Mai Mee Niyam" (Ost. Club Friday The Series 8)
- 2019: "Phit Rue Thi Rak Thoe" (Ost. Krong Kram)
- 2021: "Prakob Lok Khuen Mai"
- 2024: "Phuean Rak"

=== Special albums ===
- 1995: Khon Nok Gub Dok Mai (Featured)
- 2000: Seven Vol.1 (Collaborated Album)
- 2000: Seven Vol.2 (Collaborated Album)
- 2003: Mai Red Album
- 2003: Mai Blue Album
- 2003: Phumphuang Nai Duang Jai Vol.1
- 2003: Phumphuang Nai Duang Jai Vol.2
- 2004: Phumphuang Nai Duang Jai Vol.3
- 2004: Phumphuang Nai Duang Jai Vol.4
- 2005: Mai Then & Now 1
- 2005: Mai Then & Now 2
- 2008: Mai Sing Asanee
- 2009: Mai & Tina Beauty on the beat
- 2024: Khon Nok Gub Dok Mai: Dream For Love (Featured / EP)

== Filmography ==
=== Television ===
==== Drama ====
- 2019 Krong Kam (กรงกรรม) (Act Art Generation/Ch.3) as Yoi () (ย้อย อัศวรุ่งเรืองกิจ ()) with Prin Wikran
- 2022 Sarb Sorn Ruk (สาปซ่อนรัก) (TV Scene & Picture/Ch.3) as Dujhong (Hong) (ดุจหงส์ ยินดีพงษ์ปรีชา (คุณนายหงส์)) with สุรจิต บุญญานนท์

==== Sitcom ====
- 1989 (ตะกายดาว ตอนที่ 6 ดาวหลบใน) (GMM Grammy/Ch.9) as (Cameo)

=== Film ===
- 2001 The Legend of Suriyothai
- 2008 Memory
- 2009 Meat Grinder (เชือดก่อนชิม) as But
- 2010 Die a Violent Death
- 2011 Mai Ka Mam Don Ka Don

=== Music video ===
- 1999 Glub Mai Dai Pai Mai Teung - Thongchai McIntyre (กลับไม่ได้ ไปไม่ถึง - ธงไชย แมคอินไตย์) (GMM Grammy/YouTube:GMM GRAMMY OFFICIAL)
- 2014 Kwan Thai Jai Nueng Deaw - Carabao (ขวานไทยใจหนึ่งเดียว - คาราบาว) (Warner Music (Thailand)/YouTube:Carabao Official)
