= Wayupak Montra =

Thai television soap opera

- Also known as: Wayupak's Enchantment
- วายุภัคมนตรา
- Written by: Thanwadee Satityuthakarn
- Directed by: Off Pongpat Vachirabunjong
- Starring: Pakorn Chatborirak; Rasri Balenciaga
- Opening theme: Hai Rak Dern Tang Ma Jer Gan (Let Love Meet) by Palm Instinct
- Ending theme: Ta Haak Mai Ruk by Rose Sirinthip
- Country of origin: Thailand
- Original language: Thai
- No. of episodes: 8

Production
- Producer: Act Art Generation
- Production location: Thailand

Original release
- Network: Channel 3
- Release: 10 December – 25 December 2010

Related
- Pathapee Leh Ruk

Wayupak Montra (Thai: วายุภัคมนตรา; RTGS: Wayu-phak Montra) is 2010 Thai television soap opera and the last installment of a four-drama series called Four Hearts of the Mountains (Thai: 4 หัวใจแห่งขุนเขา; RTGS: Si Hua Chai Haeng Khun Khao) that aired on Channel 3. It starred Pakorn Chatborirak and Rasri Balenciaga.

== Synopsis ==
Rasri Balenciaga plays the character of Thichakorn "Kati" a romance novel writer who goes by "Humming Bird." She is the daughter of a famous sorcerer. She decides to go research for her new novel in the vineyard. During her research she met Wayupak "Lom" (Pakorn Chatborirak), a playboy and the owner of Sailom Vineyard. Thichakorn "Kati" has sixth sens. She can see the female spirit that keeps following Wayupak "Lom" everywhere, but Wayupak doesn't believe her. He thinks that "Kati" is meddlesome and nonsensical, but he doesn't know when Thichakorn has been in his heart and he can't let her go.

== Cast ==
=== Main cast ===
- Pakorn Chatborirak (Boy) as Wayupak "Lom" Adisuanrangsan
- Rasri Balenciaga (Margie) as Thichakorn "Kati"
- Nadech Kugimiya (Barry) as Akkanee "Fai" Adisuanrangsan
- Prin Suparat (Mark) as Pathapee "Din" Adisuanrangsan
- Urassaya Sperbund (Yaya) as Ajjima "Jeed" Posawat-Adisuanrangsan
- Chalida Vijitvongthong (Mint) as Cher-Aim Vongvanisakunkit-Adisuanrangsan

=== Supporting cast ===
- Kimberly Ann Voltemas (Kim) as Thipthara "Nam" Adisuanrangsan-Rajaput
- Atichart Chumnanon (Aum) as Prince Phuwanate Rajaput
- Sumonrat Vattanaselarat (Peemai) as Patchanee "Mink"
- Treepon Pormsuwan (Tob) as Panu
- Alexandra Stebert as Chantal
- Supitcha Mongkoljittanon (Prae) as Ruk
- Tatsapon Vivitawan (Peterpan) as Yom
- Suchao Pongvilai as Krairit
- Pawinar Chaleevsakul as Thip

== Awards ==
Year	Award/Recognition	Category	Nominee	Result
2010	Top Awards	Best Actor in a Lakorn	Pakorn Chatborirak	Nominated
