= Tara Tipa =

Thai actor and model (born 1996)

- ธารา ทิพา
- Born: Tara Tipa; January 9, 1996 (age 30); Sa Kaeo Province, Thailand
- Other name: Boat (Nickname)
- Education: Bangkok University (Digital Media & Cinematic Arts)
- Occupation: Actor
- Years active: 2013–present
- Agent: Channel 3 (2014–present)
- Height: 1.85 m (6 ft 1 in)

Tara Tipa (Thai: ธารา ทิพา; born January 9, 1996, in Thailand), nickname Boat (Thai: โบ๊ท), is a Thai actor.

== Early life ==
Tipa was born on January 9, 1996, in Aranyaprathet District. Sa Kaeo Province, Thailand. He graduated from Samrejvittaya School and from high school School of Science-Mathematics Plan Chanhunbamphen School. He is currently studying at School of Digital Media & Cinematic Arts Bangkok University.

== Career ==
Boat entered the industry by walking to the Nagara shirt room and in Bangkok International. He appeared in the music video (W8) of artist Gene Kasidit and Boet. He appeared in a semi-stage sitcom, My Melody 360 Ongsa Rak as Sun.

He appeared in Fai Ruk Plerng Kaen portraying Tanyagorn (Lek).

== Filmography ==
=== Television series ===
Year	Title	Role	Network	Notes
2013	My Melody 360 Ongsa Rak	Sun	Modernine TV	Support Role
2013	My Melody 360 Ongsa Rak Season 2	Sun	Modernine TV	Cameo
2014	Fai Ruk Plerng Kaen	Thanyakorn Chotinupong (Lek)	Channel 3	Support Role
2015	Tai Ngao Jan	Satayu (young)	Channel 3	Cameo
2015	Bu Ram Pram Pra	Trilanka Mangkawong	Channel 3	
2016	Saeng Tian	Sibtit / Yak	Channel 3	
2016	Duang Jai Pisut 2016	Look Mee (Older)	Channel 3	Cameo
2018	Mr. Merman	Talay	Channel 3	
2018	The Mirror when gambling is broken	Diao	Channel 3	The short story series ends in the episode.
2019	Plerng Naka	Riew / Tattanaka [Past]	Channel 3	
2020	Vasana Rak	Phethay Samakkhonkon	Channel 3	
2021	Peesard Saen Kol	Phrot	Channel 3	
2022	Sarb Sorn Ruk	Thian	Channel 3	
2025	Mae Liang	Phuwin	Channel 3	
2025	Khun Phi Jao Kha...Dichan Pen Han Mi Chai Hong	Chang	Channel 3	
2025	Nap 8	Yamyen	Channel 3	
2025	Jai Khang Jao	On	Channel 3	
2025	Chao Khun Phi Kap I Nang Kham Duang	Dr.Num	Channel 3	Cameo
2026	Pin Anong (2026)	Tadsana	Channel 3	
2026	Payak Rai Sorn Lai	Thammathat	Channel 3	
2026	Thatri	Thatri Worapat	Channel 3	

=== Music videos ===
- ร (W8) Artist Gene Kasidit (2013)

=== Ost ===
- ให้ความรักโอบกอด (Ost. My Melody 360 Ongsa Rak) with Apsarasiri Intarakasin, Chontida Asavahame, Mongkol kitsawang, David Bunrin
- รักดี (Rak Dee Ost.Sang Tien)
