= Thanayong Wongtrakul =

Thai actor

- ธนายง ว่องตระกูล
- Born: 27 November 1970 (age 55); Bangkok, Thailand
- Other name: Kradum
- Occupation: Actor
- Years active: 1990–present
- Notable work: The Man from Nowhere (2010)
- Height: 182

Thanayong Wongtrakul (Thai: ธนายง ว่องตระกูล), nickname Kradum (Thai: กระดุม), was born on November 27, 1970, in Thailand. He is an actor, known for Children of the Dark (2008) and The Man from Nowhere (2010).

== Filmography ==
=== Film ===
| Year | Title | Role | Notes | Ref. |
|---|---|---|---|---|
| 2003 | Crazy Cops | | Guest role | |
| 2004 | Curse of the Sun | Sawaeng | | |
| 2008 | Children of the Dark | | | |
| 2009 | Deathwave | Chartrat | | |
| 2010 | The Man from Nowhere | Ramrowan | Support role | |
| 2012 | Hmong, Blood for Freedom | Major Ong-art | | |
| 2014 | Ghost Coins | Mek | Main role | |
| 2014 | Lupin the 3rd | Royal | Support role | |
| 2015 | Siam Yuth: The Dawn of the Kingdom | Khun Rammuenchong | | |
| 2019 | Pee Nak | Nong's father | Support role | |

=== Television dramas ===
| Year | Title | Role | Notes | Channel |
|---|---|---|---|---|
| 1990 | Wongsakanayat | Nui | Support role | Channel 3 |
| 1990 | Wimarn Fai | | Support role | Channel 3 |
| 1991 | Ban Sao Sod | | Support role | Channel 3 |
| 1991 | Pak | | Support role | Channel 3 |
| 1992 | Chuen Cheewaa Navy | Chief Engineer | Support role | Channel 3 |
| 1993 | Seewika | Police Captain Thira | Support role | Channel 7 |
| 1994 | Honor game | Doctor Kasit | | Channel 5 |
| 1994 | Mia Kang Tanon | Wine Bamnanrak | Main role | Channel 5 |
| 1995 | Khun Seuk | Sema | Main role | Channel 9 |
| 1995 | HeHa Mia Navy | Lieutenant Commander Tevin | Main role | Channel 5 |
| 1996 | Saap Norasing | Police Major Komkrit | Support role | Channel 5 |
| 1997 | Kai Look Keuy | | Main role | Channel 3 |
| 1997 | Kor Piang Ruk | | Main role | Channel 9 |
| 1998 | Puer Jai Wai Jeb | Police Lieutenant | Guest role | Channel 7 |
| 1998 | Nang Barb | Police Lieutenant Colonel Thoedtham | Support role | Channel 7 |
| 1999 | Kaew Kinnaree | Ongart | Support role | Channel 7 |
| 1999 | Dang Fai Tai Nam | Thanayut / "Yut" | Support role | Channel 7 |
| 2001 | Kot Klet Mungkorn | | Support role | Channel 7 |
| 2001 | San Sab | Chuan | Support role | Channel 5 |
| 2001 | Atitha | Khun San | Support role | Channel 7 |
| 2001 | Fai Nam Kang | Sutee | Support role | Channel 5 |
| 2003 | Pom Rak Nuanchawee | Police Major Banjerd | Support role | iTV (Thailand) |
| 2004 | Mon Rak Asoon | Wannarat | Support role | Channel 3 |
| 2004 | Fah mai | Prince Mungkut (Krom Meun Jitsunthon) | Support role | channel 7 |
| 2008 | Sood Dan Hua Jai | Chanin (Police Captain) | Support role | |
| 2009 | Fai Ruk Asoon | Police Major Pongthep | Support role | |
| 2010 | Phraathit Kheun Ram | News Editor | Support role | thaiPbs |
| 2012 | Zeal 5 Kon Gla Tah Atam | (Ep.93) | Guest role | Channel 5 |
| 2012 | Meu Prab Por Look Orn | Athip | Support role | Channel 3 |
| 2012 | The Sixth Sense | Piyaphan (Resort Owner) | Support role | Channel 3 |
| 2012 | Yod Rak Nak Soo | | Support role | Channel 3 |
| 2013 | Kongroi Krathalek | Podam | Support role | Channel 3 |
| 2013 | Phu Chana Sib tid | King Takayutpi | Support role | Chanal 8 |
| 2013 | Nak Su Maha Kan | Police Major Ramet | Support role | channel 3 |
| 2014 | Khun Chai Ruk Leh | | Support role | channel 3 |
| 2014 | Thida Dance | | Support role | channel 3 |
| 2014 | Ruk Ok Rit | Prathom | Support role | channel 3 |
| 2014 | Pleng Rak Pha Puen Taek | Colonel Lertyot | Guest role | Channel 7 |
| 2014 | The Romance Affair | | Guest role | Channel 8 |
| 2015 | Sai Lap Sam Mithi | Pramook | Support role | Channel 3 |
| 2015 | Peuan Paeng | Por Pit | Support role | Channel 7 |
| 2015 | Mor Phee Cyber | Police Lieutenant Colonel Decha | Support role | Channel 3 |
| 2015 | Kha Ma Kap Phra | | Support role | Channel 7 |
| 2015 | Song Huajai Nee Puea Tur | Tanong | Support role | Channel 3 |
| 2016 | Padiwaradda | Chode | Support role | Channel 3 |
| 2016 | Atitha | Naai Taen | Support role | Channel 7 |
| 2016 | Sarawat Teuan | Ja Tiang | Support role | Channel 7 |
| 2016 | Bua Laeng Nam | (Montra's father) | Guest role | PPTV |
| 2016 | Rang Tawan | Chaat (Sheriff) | Guest role | Channel 3 |
| 2016 | Pra Teap Rak Hang Jai | Yuttachai | Support role | Channel 3 |
| 2016 | Raeng Chang | Chao Phraya Boriban | Guest Role | Workpoint TV |
| 2017 | The Legend of King Naresuan The Series: Season 1 | Lord Luckwaitummoo | Support role | Mono 29 |
| 2017 | Cheewit Puer Kah Huajai Puer Tur | Mao | Support role | One 31 |
| 2017 | Paragit Ruk Series: Niew Hua Jai Sood Glai Puen | General Anuchit | Support role | Channel 7 |
| 2017 | Massaya | Luangrad Borirak (Sajee's husband) | Support role | Channel 7 |
| 2017 | Mahahin | Pooyai Saeng | Support role | Channel 7 |
| 2018 | Meu Prab Yeow Dam | Siapin | | Channel 7 |
| 2018 | Sanae Rak Nang Cin | Mana Yenjai | Guest role | Channel 3 |
| 2018 | My Hero Series: Matuphoom Haeng Huachai | Police Major General Mongkhon Ruangritthikun | Support role | Channel 3 |
| 2018 | Duang Jai Nai Fai Nhao | Dan | Support role | Channel 3 |
| 2018 | Sai Lohit | Ne Myo Thihapate | Guest role | Channel 7 |
| 2018 | Suparburoot Mongkut Petch | Amnaj | Support role | One 31 |
| 2018 | Nai Keun Nao Sang Dao Yung Oun | Police Colonel Pracha | Support role | Channel 7 |
| 2018 | Jao Saming | Ja Chai | Support role | Channel 7 |
| 2019 | Sarawat Yai | Mu Chart (Sergeant Chart) | Guest role | Channel 7 |
| 2019 | The Man Series: Pupa | Uncle Thawiwat | Guest role | Channel 3 |
| 2019 | Plerng Prang Tian | Nankaew | Support role | Channel 3 |
| 2019 | The Seer | Police Colonel Sombat | Support role | One 31 |
| 2019 | Likit Haeng Jan | Phraya Phakdi Pinitchai | Guest role | Channel 3 |
| 2019 | Suparburoot Jorm Jon: Maturot Lohgan | Police Lieutenant Colonel Somyot Sakulpithak | Support role | Channel 7 |
| 2019 | TharnType | (Type’s father) | Guest role | One 31, LINE TV |
| 2019 | Dtagrut Ton | Chai Kritngern | Support role | Channel 7 |
| 2020 | AI, Her | K | Support role | |
| 2020 | Khun Chai Tum Raberd | Thongmee | Support role | Channel 7 |
| 2020 | Khon Nuea Khon | (Ep.3,15&16) | Guest Role | Channel 7 |
| 2020 | Pleng Rak Chao Phraya | Bancha | Support role | One 31 |
| 2020 | Singh Sang Pa | Police Lieutenant Colonel Thep | Support role | Channel 7 |
| 2020 | TharnType 2: 7 Years of Love | (Type’s father) | Support role | One 31, LINE TV |
| 2020 | Pin Prai | Pluang | Support role | Channel 7 |
| 2020 | The Confidence | Yan Song | Support role | Mango TV |
| 2021 | Thang Suea Phan | Kong Namngam | Support role | Channel 7 |
| 2021 | Dong Phaya Yen | Sueachom | Support role | One 31 |
| 2021 | Talay Duerd | Nathan | Support role | Channel 7 |
| 2021 | Lay Down and Fire | | Support role | Channel 7 |
| 2021 | My Little Saucy Girl | Yiam (Village Chief) | Support role | Channel 3 |
| 2021 | Nora Saon | Don | Support role | One 31 |
| 2022 | The Musical Hero | Muchuen Chuenban | Support role | Channel 7 |
| 2022 | The Miracle of Teddy Bear | Anik Thanakul | Support role | Channel 3 |
| 2022 | My Friend, The Enemy; Koo Wein | Thammachai Phasuksawasdee (Secular) / Pra Thammachai (Luang Pee Thammachai) (Priest) | Cameo | Channel 3 |
| 2022 | My Queen (2022); Rak Sutthai Yai Jom Wiang | Kriengkrai Tanrattanachoksakul | Cameo | One 31 |
| 2022 | The Kinnaree Conspiracy | Luang Gocha-Ishak | Support role | Channel 3 |
| 2022 | Kwang Tarng Puen | Niyom Thara | Support role | Channel 7 |
| 2023 | Tanaosri | King of the Underworld | Cameo | Channel 8 |
| 2023 | Tee Sud Khong Huajai | Athit | Cameo | Channel 3 |
| 2023 | Phra Nakhon 2410 | Rit's father | Cameo | One 31 |
| 2023 | Plerng Prai (2023) | Wet | Support role | Channel 7 |
| 2023 | Mae Poo Priew (2023) | Thanayong (Kradum) | Cameo | Channel 7 |
| 2023 | Jom Jon Dok Maikhao | Suea Chan | Support role | One 31 |
| 2023 | Suep Lap Mo Rabat | Thanet | Support role | Channel 3 |
| 2024 | Mueprap Mahaut | Thawi | Support role | Channel 3 |
| 2024 | Fang Len Fai | Itt (Aon's father) | Support role | MONO 29 |
| 2024 | Plon Khrang Sutthai | Itthiphol | Support role | Channel 7 |
| 2024 | Sat Suea | Hia Liaw | Support role | MONO 29 |
| 2024 | Mon Rak Mae Klong | Suriya / Thep | Support role | One 31 |
| 2025 | Jai Khang Jao | Prince Nakonborirak | Support role | Channel 3 |
| 2025 | Yai Pla Lai Kub Nai Hi So | Traiphop Anansapmetha | Support role | Channel 3 |
| 2026 | Yiwha Datang | | Support role | Channel 3 |
| 2026 | | | Support role | One 31 |
| TBA | | | Support role | Channel 3 |
| TBA | | | Support role | One 31 |
| TBA | | | Support role | Channel 3 |

=== Television series ===
- 2012 Zeal 5 Kon Gla Tah Atam () (/Ch.5) as (Ep.93) Guest role
- 2012 The Sixth Sense () (/Ch.3) as Piyaphan (Resort Owner)
- 2016 I Was Born In the Reign of Rama IX The Series (เราเกิดในรัชกาลที่ ๙ เดอะซีรีส์) (The One Enterprise/One 31) as Police (ตำรวจ) (Cameo)
- 2018 (ซีรีส์ ฤดูกาลแห่งรัก: ฝน) (/Thai PBS) as police Inspector (สารวัตรตํารวจ)
- 2021 Golden Blood (รักมันมหาศาล) (/Ch.3) as Sakkhee (Gangster)
- 2021 YOU...VACCINE () (/Thai PBS) as Doctor Trin
- 2022 Something in My Room (ผมกับผีในห้อง) (/Ch.3) as Phra Krai
- 2022 Jao Ying Lhong Yook (2022) (เจ้าหญิงหลงยุค) (Pai Kor Rai/Ch.9) as Jao Ai Kam Tan
- 2022 (ทริอาช The Series) (TV Thunder/Ch.3) as Doctor Sak
- 2022 (พาย สายน้ำแห่งความฝัน) (D O do multimedia/Thai PBS) as Natee with Orn-anong Panyawong
- 2022 Catch Me Baby (เซียนสับราง) (Bearcave Studio/WeTV) as Chanwat Paophandee (Sia-wat) (Captain's father) with Cindy Bishop (Cameo)
- 2023 Chain Of Heart (ตรวนธรณี) (MAXIMON SOLUTION/Ch.3) as Ait (Hin, Din, Sai's father) with Prissana Klampinij

== Awards and nominations ==
| Year | Awards | Category | Nominated work | Result |
|---|---|---|---|---|
| 1995 | Mekhala Awards | Male Rising Star | Khun Seuk | Won |
| 2010 | 8th Korean Film Awards 2010 | Best Supporting Actor | The Man from Nowhere | Nominated |
| 2016 | 5th APAN Star Awards 2016 | Best APAN Star Award | —N/a | Won |
