= Natnicha Cherdchubuppakaree =

Thai actress (1997-2018)

Natnicha Cherdchubupagaree
- Born: Natnicha Uttawat (Thai: ณัฐนิชา อุตตวัฒน์); 16 November 1997; Thailand
- Died: 7 April 2018 (aged 20); Phra Nakhon Si Ayutthaya Province, Thailand
- Occupation(s): Singer, Actress
- Years active: 2002–2007; 2014 – 2018

Natnicha Cherdchubupagaree (Thai: ณัฐนิชา เชิดชูบุพการี 16 November 1997 – 7 April 2018), nicknamed Inn (Thai: อิน), was a Thai actress.

== Discography ==
=== Television dramas ===
- (2003) kaewtawaanjai ch7
- (2003) pornprom onlaweng ch7
- (2004) rakkernpikadkean ch7
- (2005) panndinhuajai ch3
- (2005) kaewrelm
- 2003 Kaew Ta Warn Jai (แก้วตาหวานใจ) (/Ch.7) as Alin Warodom (Modtanoy) (อลิน วโรดม (มดตะนอย))
- 2003 Pon Prom Onlaweng (2003) (พรพรหมอลเวง) (/Ch.7) as Kattaleeya (Kat) (แคทรียา (แคท))
- 2003 (นายร้อยสอยดาว) (/Ch.7) as Meen (มีน)
- 2003 Mur Puen Por Luk Kit (2003) (มือปืนพ่อลูกติด) (Lenitas/Ch.7) as Hanny (Cameo) (ฮันนี่ (รับเชิญ))
- 2003 Kularb Len Fai (กุหลาบเล่นไฟ) (/Ch.7) as Dao (chird) (ดาว (วัยเด็ก))
- 2004 Ruk Kern Pikad Kaen (2004) (รักเกินพิกัดแค้น) (Polyplus Entertainment/Ch.7) as (chird) (Cameo) (นิษฐา (วัยเด็ก) (รับเชิญ))
- 2004 Ruen Mai See Beige (เรือนไม้สีเบจ) (TV Scene & Picture/Ch.3) as Nok Gaew (Cameo) (นกแก้ว (รับเชิญ))
- 2005 (ขบวนการปุกปุย) (/Ch.7) as Pub (ปั๊บ)
- 2005 (8-18-28 บ้านแฝดยกกำลัง 2) (TV Thunder/Ch.3) as Kung King (กุ๊งกิ๊ง)
- 2005 Pan Din Hua Jai (แผ่นดินหัวใจ) (Broadcast Thai Television/Ch.3) as Ma Prang (มะปราง)
- 2005 Barb Rak Talay Fun (บาปรักทะเลฝัน) (Quiz and Quest/Ch.3) as Aumakorn (Aum) (chird) (Cameo) (อุมากร (อุ๋ม) (วัยเด็ก) (รับเชิญ))
- 2005 Keaw Lerm Korn (2005) (แก้วลืมคอน) (Exact-Scenario/Ch.5) as Kaew/Chidchanok (chird) (Cameo) (แก้ว/ชิดชนก (วัยเด็ก) (รับเชิญ))
- 2005 Ruk Kong Nai Dok Mai (รักของนายดอกไม้) (Red Drama/Ch.3) as Bow Chompoo (โบว์ชมพู)
- 2005 (นกออก) (/Ch.7) as Lee Na (ลีน่า)
- 2005 Pa Yak Rai Hau Jai Jew (พยัคฆ์ร้ายหัวใจจิ๋ว) (/Ch.7) as Salim (ซ่าหริ่ม)
- 2006 (โรบอทน้อยหัวใจเพชร) (/ITV) as ( ())
- 2006 Plaew Fai Nai Fhun (2006) (เปลวไฟในฝัน) (/Ch.7) as Mee Na (มีนา)
- 2006 (สุดรักสุดดวงใจ) (/Ch.3) as Ploypim (chird) (Cameo) (พลอยพิมพ์ (วัยเด็ก) (รับเชิญ))
- 2006 Tay Jai Rak Nak Wang Pan (เทใจรักนักวางแผน) (Five Fingers Productions/Ch.3) as Lin (Cameo) (หลิน (รับเชิญ))
- 2006 Poh Krua Hua Pah (2006) (พ่อครัวหัวป่าก์) (/ITV) as Thong Tra (chird) (Cameo) (ทองตรา (วัยเด็ก) (รับเชิญ))
- 2006 Yuer Marn (เหยื่อมาร) (Who & Who/Ch.3) as Nu Daeng (Cameo) (หนูแดง (รับเชิญ))
- 2007 Saeng Soon (2007) (แสงสูรย์) (Exact-Scenario/Ch.5) as Chothirut (chird) (Cameo) (โชติรส (วัยเด็ก) (รับเชิญ))
- 2008 Ruk Sorn Kaen (รักซ่อนแค้น) (Polyplus Entertainment/Ch.3) as (น้ำเหนือ (วัยเด็ก))
- 2015 The Kiss of Justice (จุมพิตพยัคฆ์สาว) (Kantana Group/Ch.7) as Pang (ฟาง)
- 2018 Sen Son Kon Rak (เส้นสนกลรัก) (Cholumpi Brother/Ch.3) as Noina (น้อยหน่า)

=== Television series ===
- 2018 Bangkok Ghost Stories: (Bangkok Ghost Stories ตอน ดีเจคลื่นแทรก) (/Ch.3) as Fah (ฟ้า)

=== Television sitcom ===
- 20 () (/) as () (Cameo)

=== Film ===
- 20 () (อ) () as ()

=== Song ===
- 2007 Album น้องอินมาค่ะ VOL.1 (Sony Music)
- 2007 Album น้องอินมาค่ะ VOL.2 (Sony Music)
- 2008 Album Just Kid In (Sony Music)

=== Music video appearance ===
- 20 () - (C/YouTube:)
- 20 () - (C/YouTube:)
