= Louis Scott (actor) =

Thai actor and singer

- หลุยส์ สก๊อต
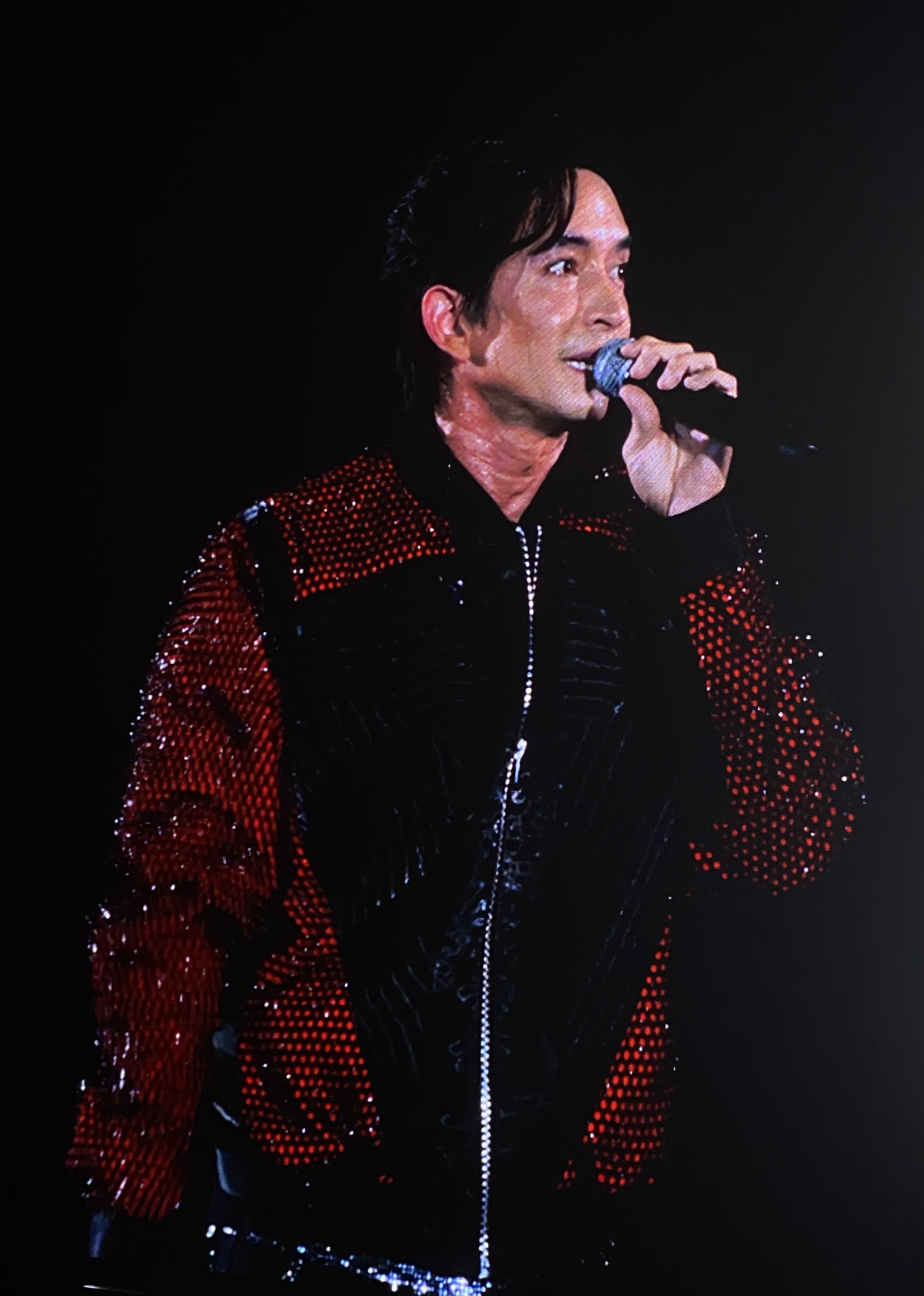
- Louis in 2023
- Born: 4 March 1982 (age 44); Nairobi, Kenya
- Other name: Louis (หลุยส์)
- Education: Southern New Hampshire University
- Occupations: Actor; model; singer; racer
- Years active: 1994–present
- Agent: Channel 3 (2006–present)
- Spouse: Ramida Prapasanobon (m. 2020)

Louis Scott (Thai: หลุยส์ สก๊อต; born 4 March 1982), nicknamed Louis (Thai: หลุยส์), is a Scottish-Thai singer and actor. He is best known for his roles in Dok Som See Thong, Sawan Biang, Bupphe Sanniwat, and Roy Leh Marnya on Thailand's Channel 3.

== Early life ==
Louis is the son of Ian James Scott and Siwaporn Likittamrak. He has an older brother named Stuart Scott. He graduated from Bangkok Patana School and then from Southern New Hampshire University with a degree in business administration.

== Career ==
Louis entered the entertainment industry at the age of 7, starting with an advertisement. In 1994, he made his debut in the movie "โตแล้วต้องโต๋", but he became famous for being in a duo band called "Raptor" with Joni Anwar, who at the time was the youngest singer in Thailand. The duo released their first album, Raptor in the 1990s and became a very popular duo.

After five years, the duo band Raptor decided to disband. The reason for the breakup of Raptor is because they want to go back to school; they missed out on a lot. They take so many jobs that they don't have time to study, so they eventually parted ways in different directions. After that, Louis came back again with a remarkable drama that made him famous again, namely the drama Dok Som See Thong with the role of "CK".

He continues to make a name for himself with the role of "Tom / Pawan" in the TV drama Sawan Biang starred top actress Ann Thongprasom and top actor Theeradej Wongpuapan.

In 2018, Louis starred in Bupphe Sanniwat, which was a major hit in Thailand and gained popularity across Asia.

== Personal life ==
Louis was married to Ramida Praphasanobol after 14 years of relationship and had a simple marriage ceremony on 20 March 2020.

== Filmography ==
=== Films ===
Year	Title	Role	Notes
1998	Wildest Days	—N/a	Main Role
2005	The Rascals	Khing	Main Role
2009	Sawasdee Bangkok		Main Role
2010	Princess Tukky	Ob	Main Role
2018	Gravity of Love	Tae	Main Role

=== Television ===
Year	Title	Role	Notes	Network
1999	Ruk Sai Sai Hua Jai Diew Gun	Sudteerak / "Sud"	Main Role	Channel 3
2002	Neung Fah Lung Ka Diew	William	Main Role	Channel 3
2003	18/80 Peurn See Mai Mee Sua	Ot	Main Role	Channel 3
2005	Plerng Payu	Sahat	Support Role	Channel 7
2006	Khon Talay	Mahasamutr	Main Role	ITV
2006	Krang Neung Muer Rao Ruk Gun	Nepali	Main Role	Channel 3
2006	Duang Jai Patiharn	Methin	Support Role	Channel 7
2006	Ruam Pon Kon Jaew	—N/a	Main Role	Channel 9
2008	Sawan Biang (2008 TV series)	Tom / Pawan	Support Role	Channel 3
2009	Mae Ka Khanom Wan	Taratit / Mark	Support Role	Channel 3
2009	Spy	Dr. Tom	Support Role	Channel 9
2009	Plerng SeeRoong	Mai	Support Role	Channel 3
2010	Wan Jai Gub Nai Jom Ying	Chatsawin	Main Role	Channel 3
2010	365 Wun Haeng Rak	Nawat / Wat	Support Role	Channel 3
2011	Dok Som See Thong	Kietkorn / C.K.	Support Role	Channel 3
2011	Ruen Hor Ror Hien	Tawanchai	Main Role	Channel 3
2012	The Sixth Sense	Tinh	Main Role	Channel 3
2012	Tarnchai Nai Sai Mok	Prince Sow		Channel 3
2013	The Sixth Sense 2	Tinh		Channel 3
2014	Por Kai Jaae	Atit		Channel 3
2014	Sam Bai Mai Thao	West		Channel 3
2016	Bussaba Rae Fun	—N/a	Guest Role	Channel 3
2017	Por Krua Hua Pa	Kamolchanok	Main Role	Channel 3
2017	Khluen Chiwit	Chaiyan	Support Role	Channel 3
2017	The Cupids Series; Kamathep Prab Marn	Kong	Support Role	Channel 3
2017	Plerng Boon	Terdpan / "Terd"	Support Role	Channel 3
2018	Bupphe Sanniwat	Constantine Phaulkon	Main Role	Channel 3
2018	My Hero Series; Matuphoom Haeng Huachai	Akin Nopprasit	Guest Role	Channel 3
2018	Montra Lai Hong	Akin Nopprasit	Guest Role	Channel 3
2018	Lom Phrai Pook Rak	Akin Nopprasit	Guest Role	Channel 3
2018	Sen Son Kon Rak	Akin Nopprasit	Guest Role	Channel 3
2018	Tai Peek Pak Sa	Akin Nopprasit	Main Role	Channel 3
2018	Duay Raeng Atitharn	Seehanat / Nai "Singh"	Support Role	Channel 3
2020	Roy Leh Marnya	Max	Support Role	Channel 3
2021	Piphob Himmaparn	Krit / Kritsada, Hiran	Main Role	Channel 3
2022	Rakkaew	Rida	Main Role	Channel 3

=== Master of Ceremony: MC ===
Year	Title	Notes
2020–Present	YouTube channel: นุ่นหลุยส์ NoonLouis	With Ramida Praphasanobol

== Discography ==
=== Albums ===
Release date	Album title	Notes
1999	Louis Scott	
2001	Louis Hacker	

== Awards and nominations ==
Year	Award	Category	Nominated work	Result
2006	21st Golden Television Awards	Best Supporting Actor	Duang Jai Patiharn	Won
2011	32nd Golden Television Awards	Best Supporting Actor	Dok Som See Thong	Won
2018	The 8th Nataraj Award	Best Supporting Actor	Plerng Boon 2017	Won
2018	Maya Public Awards 2018	Supporting Actor & People's Favorite	Plerng Boon 2017	Won
2019	The 33rd Golden Television Awards	Best Supporting Actor	Bupphe Sanniwat	Won
2019	Asian Television Awards 2018	Best Supporting Actor	Bupphe Sanniwat	Nominated
2021	Siam Series Awards 2021	Best Supporting Actor	Roy Leh Marnya	Won
