= Thakrit Tawanpong =

Thai actor

- ฐกฤต ตวันพงค์
- Born: Thakrit Hamannopjit; April 10, 1989 (age 37); Nakhon Si Thammarat, Thailand
- Other names: Phet; Phet Thakrit
- Occupations: Actor; singer
- Years active: 2012–present
- Agent: Channel 3 (2012–present)

Thakrit Tawanpong (Thai: ฐกฤต ตวันพงค์) (born April 10, 1989), or better known as Phet Thakrit is ThaiLand's Channel 3 Television actor.

== Career ==
=== 2012–present ===
Phet first starred in the movie, First Kiss with costar Kaneungnij Jaksamittanon (Rotmay) in 2012. He was then cast in the hit Lakorn, The Sixth Sense the same year with Kritsiri Suksawat. He was then reunited with the same casts for a second part of The Sixth Sense in 2013 and an evening lakorn, Chat Jao Paya with Michelle Behrmann.

Phet Thakrit debuted into the entertainment world through music videos, but he did not get known until he starred in the movie Ruk Sood Tai Pai Nah (First Kiss), in which he starred alongside Rotmay Kaneungnij. It is said that Rotmay picked him for the role herself, through casting. He is now signed with CH3 and was cast into the hit lakorn The Sixth Sense. -Aikoden.

He is best known for his lakorns, The Sixth Sense and Bang Rajun, and Krong Kam.

He practices English often and attempts to speak it, describing it as very important.

Phet describes himself as a good-nature guy. His family is important to him, making him sensitive when having family troubles. He is especially close with his father, always seen around him.

== Filmography ==
=== Movie ===
Year	Film	Role	Notes
2012	First Kiss	Bass	Lead Role
2017	Pa Rak Nam	Pana	The short film honor

=== Television series ===
Year	Title	Role	Network
2012	The Sixth Sense	Dr. Voravardh	Channel 3
2013	The Sixth Sense 2	Dr. Voravardh	Channel 3
2013	Chat Jao Paya	Wang	Channel 3
2014	Saeng Dao Klang Jai	Akin Akria	Channel 3
2014	Dao Kieng Duen	Vivit	Channel 3
2015	Bang Rajun	Khap	Channel 3
2015	Chat Jao Paya 2: Singh See Quare	Wang	Channel 3
2016-2017	Dao Lhong Fah Phupaa See Ngern	Nathan	Channel 3
2017	Por Yung Lung Mai Warng	Tok	Channel 3
2018	Nueng Dao Fah Deaw	Nant	Channel 3
2018	Keaw Kumpun	Sura Mara	Channel 3
2019	Krong Kam	Pathom Atsawarungrueangkit / Chai	Channel 3
2019	Likhit Haeng Jan	Luang Attakorn	Channel 3
2019	Heyha Mia Navy	Lieutenant Phataitonong	Channel 3
2020	Roy Leh Marnya	Nat Peerapat	Channel 3
2021	Dao Kon La Duang	Sunai	Channel 3
2021	Kaen Kaew	Saran (Ran)	Channel 3
2023	Love the Way You Lie	Pe	Channel 3
2023	Conniving Bedfellows / Chai Paetsaya	Phoomjai Surapanthakarn (Phoom)	Channel 3
2023	Love Destiny 2	Phraya Ratchasakun (Thong-kham)	Channel 3
2024	Waowon Rak	Chalebutr	Channel 3
2024	Duangjai Deva Phrom : Laorchan	Phaya Trinet	Channel 3
TBA	Rak Dai Rue Young	TBA	Channel 3
