= Krong Kam =

Thai television series

- Genre: Drama; Family drama; Period; Revenge; Sorcery
- Based on: "Krong Kam" by Chulamanee
- Written by: Yingyot Panya
- Directed by: Pongpat Wachirabunjong
- Starring: Mai Charoenpura; Ranee Campen; Jirayu Tangsrisuk; Thakrit Tawanpong
- Composer: Chandelier Music
- Country of origin: Thailand
- Original language: Thai
- No. of episodes: 19

Production
- Executive producer: Thanya Wachirabunjong
- Production locations: Nong Khaem; Pathum Thani; Nakhon Pathom; Ratchaburi; Suphan Buri; Chum Saeng
- Cinematography: Pongpat Wachirabunjong
- Editor: Thanaat Kasuriya
- Running time: 150 minutes
- Production companies: Act Art Generation Co., Ltd

Original release
- Network: Channel 3
- Release: February 26 – April 30, 2019

Related
- Sud Kaen Saen Rak (2015)

Krong Kam (Thai: กรงกรรม; lit. 'Cage of Karma') is a 2019 Thai TV drama that originally aired on Channel 3 starting from February 26 to April 30, 2019 for 19 episodes.

== Synopsis ==
The whole story took place at Chum Saeng, Nakhon Sawan, in 1967. Yoi (Mai Charoenpura) is a middle-aged Thai woman who married into a Thai-Chinese family. She vowed to personally see to it that her family of six honour the Beh (Chinese: 馬) ancestors. She amassed a fortune in family businesses that consist of a grocery and the grain store, a rice mill that her husband runs, and various farmlands and properties across Nakhon Sawan province. Yoi has a sharp tongue, a quick temper, and is notoriously frugal. She lives with her husband and their four sons. Everyone who knows her, whether in the family, the household, or the town of Chum Saeng, holds her in fear.

One day, her eldest son, Chai (Thakrit Tawanpong), returns from the army with a pregnant prostitute Renu (Ranee Campen) as his wife even though he already has a fiancée, Philai (Pitchapa Phanthumchinda). Yoi rejects this and tries every possible way to make him leave Renu but fails. Unknown to her, Renu has performed black magic to tie her son's heart. She decided to marry her second son Tong (Chanathip Phothongkam) to Philai to avoid shame even though he likes a worker named Chanta (Preeyakarn Jaikanta) and also chooses to give Tong the house and store that she was supposed to give to her eldest. Her third son Sa (Jirayu Tangsrisuk) is the kindest. He is handsome, smart and charming. When Yoi finds out he has feelings for Chanta, she worries he will imitate his eldest brother. She decided to have him marry Phiangphen (Oranate D. Caballes), the daughter of a wealthy family from another subdistrict, unaware that Phiangphen's family was planning to have him marry her because she was already pregnant, in order to avoid shame. Phiangphen already had a lover, Kan (Denkhun Ngamnet), a poor young man who lived in a hut at the edge of the rice fields with his chronically ill mother. Despite the circumstances, their love for each other was strong. Even though Sa married Phiangphen, she never loved or treated him as a lover. Sa himself never violated her and remained faithful to his love for Chanta.

Later, Wanna (Rinrada Kaewbuasai), Renu's younger sister, traveled to Chum Saeng to visit her sister. By chance, she met Si Yoi's fourth son. He immediately fell in love with Wanna. Although he was a flirtatious young man with many girls following him, he truly loved Wanna.

== Cast ==
=== Beh family ===
- Mai Charoenpura as Yoi
  - Nattacha Phosung as Yoi in her youth
- Prinn Wikran as Lakseng, Yoi's husband
  - Patiphan Mimang as Lakseng in his youth
- Children
  - Thakrit Tawanpong as Pathom "Chai" Atsawarungrueangkit, first son
  - Chanathip Phothongkam as Prasong "Tong" Atsawarungrueangkit, second son
  - Jirayu Tangsrisuk as Kamon "Sa" Atsawarungrueangkit, third son
  - Vachiravit Paisarnkulwong as Mongkhon "Si" Atsawarungrueangkit, fourth son
- Employees
  - Thunyaphat Pattarateerachaicharoen as Bunpluk, Yoi's employee and Tong's second wife
  - Atthaphon Thetthawong as Pom, Yoi's employee and Bunpluk's older brother
- Relatives
  - Chomchai Chatwilai as Lim, Lakseng's mother, murdered by Yoi
  - Ratklao Amaradit as Yaem, Yoi's younger sister, protagonist in the previous prequel (Sud Kaen Saen Rak) (cameo)
    - Pornnapat Wongwiwat as Yaem in her youth

=== Renu's family ===
- Ranee Campen as Renu, raped by elder brother-in-law Dam, later first wife of Chai
- Sirintra Niyakorn as Rerai, mother of Renu, Saithong, and Wanna
- Sisters
  - Aerin Yuktadatta as Saithong, Renu's eldest sister
  - Rinrada Kaewbuasai as Wanna, Renu's younger sister and Si's love interest
- Visarut Hiranbuth as Dam, Saithong's husband
- Children
  - Pongtiwat Tangwancharoen as Pok, son of Renu and Dam
    - Pakapol Tanpanich as Pok in his youth
  - Pakpuseth Chakornviroj as Pranot, son of Renu and Chai
- Fellow prostitutes
  - Arisara Wongchalee as Tim
  - Oijai Dan-esan as Pranom, in charge of prostitution house Lotus Bar
  - Thanchanok Hongthongkam as Wan
- Suchao Pongwilai as Kon, old shaman who assists Renu

=== Philai's family ===
- Pitchapa Phanthumchinda as Philai, Tong's first wife, originally girlfriend of Chai, Tong's elder brother
- Paweena Chariffsakul as Phikun, Philai's mother
- Chalad Na Songkhla as Choet, former employee at Philai's family
- Danai Jarujinda as Somdi, young shaman, Philai's second husband

=== Chanta's family ===
- Preeyakarn Jaikanta as Chanta, love interest of Tong, Sa, and Chinnakon; secret wife of Subin, Chinnakon's elder brother-in-law; eventually second wife of Sa
- Waraphan Nguitrakul as Mui Ni, Chanta's employer
- Orasa Isarankura na Ayudhya as Puai Huai, Mui Ni's grandmother

=== Phiangphen's family ===
- Oranate D. Caballes as Phiangphen, becoming Sa's first wife while pregnant with Kan
- Denkhun Ngamnet as Kan, Phiangphen's lover and husband
- Kasama Nitsaiphan as Village Chief Son, Phiangphen's father
- Prissana Klampinij as Somphon, Son's wife and Phiangphen's mother
- Janya Thanasawangkul as Si, Son's younger sister
- Natanee Sitthisaman as Raem, Son's servant

=== Other characters ===
- Sirinrat Vidhyaphum as Onphanni, Chai's second wife
- Karunchida Khumsuwan as Mala, Si's wife
- Natnari Chuwongwan as Kamala, daughter of Mala and Si
- Jitpanu Klomkaew as District Assistant Chief Chinnakon, Chanta's husband-to-be, eventually Wanna's husband
- Kosawis Piyasakulkaew as Subin, Chinnakon's brother-in-law and Chanta's secret husband
- Chotiros Kaewpinit as Krongkaeo, Chinnakon's older sister, Subin's wife
- Pawanrat Naksuriya as Mao, kluai khaek hawker
- Khakkingrak Khikkhiksaranang as A, gold shop's owner
- Nisachon Tuamsoongnuen as Bang-on, young woman who courts Kan
- Napat Chumjittri as Wang, Kan's friend, Bang-on's husband
- Khunkanich Koomkrong as Kun, Kan's ailing mother
- Phichet Iamchaona as Sit, a luk thung band manager

== Original soundtrack ==
Krong Kam OST

Soundtrack album by Various Artists
- Released: 2019
- Genre: Soundtrack
- Language: Thai
- Label: Chandelier Music

=== Part 1 ===
Released on February 4, 2019
No.	Title	Artist	Length
1.	"Phit Rue Thi Rak Thoe" (ผิดหรือที่รักเธอ; lit: Is It Wrong to Love You?)	Mai Charoenpura	5:30

=== Part 2 ===
Released on February 25, 2019
No.	Title	Artist	Length
1.	"Tha Lueak Dai" (ถ้าเลือกได้; lit: If I Can Choose)	Wichayanee Pearklin	3:42

=== Part 3 ===
Released on March 5, 2019
No.	Title	Artist	Length
1.	"Chai Si Thao" (ใจสีเทา; lit: Grey Heart)	Jirayu Tangsrisuk	4:20

== Production ==
Krong Kam is a prequel to another drama that had been popular on Channel 3 in 2015, Sud Kaen Saen Rak (2015). Although the two dramas are not directly connected in terms of plot, they are set in the same province but in different districts and time periods. The villain protagonists of both stories, Yoi and Yaem, are portrayed as sisters. The author of the novel the series was based on, Chulamanee, admits that he used Chum Saeng, a part of his native province Nakhon Sawan, as the setting, hoping to attract more visitors to travel there, similar to many Korean drama series which showcase real locations to promote tourism. This is a comeback drama for singer Mai Charoenpura, who has not acted for years.

== Reception ==
When the drama aired, it quickly became popular. Fans and the general public traveled to Chum Saeng by train, turning this small town into a tourist destination. As of early 2021, it has been rerun thrice, with the ratings remain as good as its first broadcast.

=== Viewership ===
In this table, the blue numbers represent the lowest ratings and the red numbers represent the highest ratings.

Ep.	Original broadcast date	Average audience share (AGB Nielsen)
Ep.	Original broadcast date	Nationwide
1	February 26, 2019	3.2%
2	March 4, 2019	3.4%
3	March 5, 2019	3.7%
4	March 11, 2019	4.7%
5	March 12, 2019	5.1%
6	March 18, 2019	5.1%
7	March 19, 2019	5.7%
8	March 25, 2019	4.8%
9	March 26, 2019	5.5%
10	April 1, 2019	5.7%
11	April 2, 2019	6.3%
12	April 8, 2019	7.3%
13	April 9, 2019	7.3%
14	April 15, 2019	5.9%
15	April 16, 2019	7.4%
16	April 22, 2019	7.6%
17	April 23, 2019	8.9%
18	April 29, 2019	9.9%
19	April 30, 2019	11.1%
Average		6.2%

== Awards and nominations ==
Award	Category	Recipient	Result
Press Awards 2019	Best performance	Mai Charoenpura (as Yoi)	Won
Press Awards 2019	Best supporting actor	Chanathip Phothongkam (as Tong)	Won
Press Awards 2019	Best supporting actress	Arisara Wongchalee (as Tim)	Won
Press Awards 2019	Best rising star	Thunyaphat Pattarateerachaicharoen (as Bunpluk)	Won
Press Awards 2019	Best original work (novel)	Chulamanee	Won
Asian Academy Creative Awards 2019	Best actor in leading role	Jirayu Tangsrisuk (as Sa)	Nominated
Asian Academy Creative Awards 2019	Best actor in supporting role	Denkhun Ngamnet (as Kan)	Nominated
Asian Academy Creative Awards 2019	Best actress in supporting role	Pitchapa Phanthumchinda (as Philai)	Nominated
Asian Academy Creative Awards 2019	Best direction (fiction)	Pongpat Wachirabunjong	Nominated
Asian Academy Creative Awards 2019	Best theme song	"Phit Rue Thi Rak Thoe" (composed by Narongvit Techathanawat and Chakkrit Makkhanaso)	Nominated
Asian Academy Creative Awards 2019	Best drama series		Nominated
34th TV Gold Awards	Best actress in leading role	Mai Charoenpura (as Yoi)	Won
34th TV Gold Awards	Best actor in leading role	Jirayu Tangsrisuk (as Sa)	Nominated
34th TV Gold Awards	Best actress in supporting role	Pitchapa Phanthumchinda (as Philai)	Nominated
34th TV Gold Awards	Best artistic composition		Nominated
34th TV Gold Awards	Best direction	Pongpat Wachirabunjong	Won
34th TV Gold Awards	Best screenplay	Yingyot Panya	Won
16th Kom Chad Luek Awards	Best actress in leading role	Mai Charoenpura (as Yoi)	Won
16th Kom Chad Luek Awards	Best actress in leading role	Ranee Campen (as Renu)	Nominated
16th Kom Chad Luek Awards	Best actor in leading role	Jirayu Tangsrisuk (as Sa)	Nominated
16th Kom Chad Luek Awards	Best actor in supporting role	Chanathip Phothongkam (as Tong)	Nominated
16th Kom Chad Luek Awards	Best actress in supporting role	Pitchapa Phanthumchinda (as Philai)	Won
16th Kom Chad Luek Awards	Best direction	Pongpat Wachirabunjong	Won
16th Kom Chad Luek Awards	Best television drama		Won
16th Kom Chad Luek Awards	Best screenplay	Yingyot Panya	Won
