= Pariit Thimthong =

Thai actor (born 1996)

- ปาริธ ทิมทอง
- Born: 8 December 1996 (age 29); Thailand
- Occupation: Actor
- Years active: 2019–present

Pariit Thimthong (Thai: ปาริธ ทิมทอง; born 8 December 1996) is a Thai actor. Pariit studied high school at Suankularb Wittayalai School. Pariit graduated from Faculty of Engineering at Kasetsart University.

== Filmography ==
=== Television ===
Year	Title	Role
2019	My Secret Bride	Phadet / Sara / Tangmo
2021	Help Me Khun Pee Chuay Duay	Khetkhan
2022	A Tale of Ylang Ylang	Sala Wongkosum
2023	Matalada	Phadet
2024	Don't Come Home	Tae
