= Don't Come Home (TV series) =

- Genre: Drama, Mystery
- Written by: Aummaraporn Phandintong; Woottidanai Intarakaset
- Directed by: Woottidanai Intarakaset
- Creative director: Kissada Namuang (Art director)
- Starring: Woranuch Bhirombhakdi; Cindy Bishop; Pitchapa Phanthumchinda; Ploypaphas Fonkaewsiwaporn
- Composer: Terdsak Janpan
- Country of origin: Thailand
- Original language: Thai
- No. of series: 1
- No. of episodes: 6

Production
- Cinematography: Pasit Tandaechanurat
- Editor: Harin Paesongthai
- Running time: 40–49 minutes
- Production company: Hub Ho Hin Bangkok

Original release
- Network: Netflix
- Release: October 31, 2024

Don't Come Home (Thai: อย่ากลับบ้าน; RTGS: Ya Klap Ban) is a Thai drama and mystery television series. The series became available worldwide on Netflix on 31 October 2024. It is directed by Woottidanai Intarakaset.

== Cast ==
- Woranuch Bhirombhakdi as Varee
- Cindy Bishop as Panida
- Pitchapa Phanthumchinda as Fah
- Ploypaphas Fonkaewsiwaporn as Min
- Teerapat Sajakul as Yutthachai
- Pariit Thimthong as Tae
- Pathit Pisitkul as Danai
- Sahatchai Chumrum as Natee
- Pongpitch Preechaborisuthikul as Young Natee
- Savika Kanjanamas as Aon
- Nuttanan Khunwat as Wat
- Alina Marie Chang as Young Varee
- Tanyaphong Wichaisri as Aof
- Nut Kaoyouphung as Officer Nui
- Vithaya Pansringarm as Vichai
- Kumron Jivachat as Young Vichai
- Prarawadee Singthong as Fah's Mother
- Phuri Chaisupha as Ghost

== Episodes ==
No.	Title	Original release date
1	"Varee" (วารี)	October 31, 2024
2	"Fah" (ฟ้า)	October 31, 2024
3	"The Girl Who Disappeared" (เด็กสาวที่หายไป)	October 31, 2024
4	"Panida" (พนิดา)	October 31, 2024
5	"1992" (2535)	October 31, 2024
6	"Don't Come Home" (อย่ากลับบ้าน)	October 31, 2024

== Original soundtrack ==
- "Khwam Song Cham" (ความทรงจำ), theme by Violette Wautier
