= Pakorn Chatborirak =

Thai actor and model (born 1984)

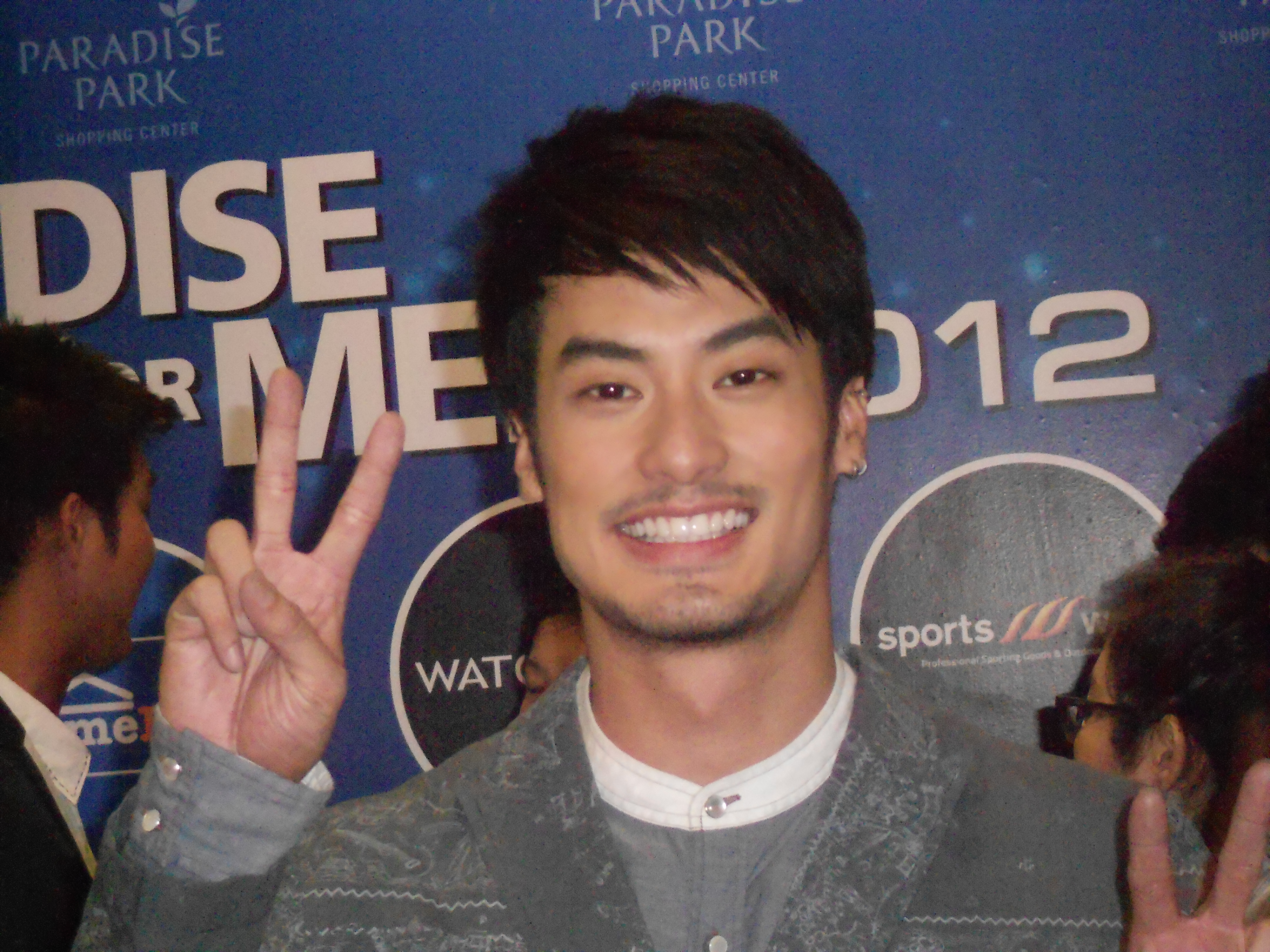
- Chatborirak in 2012
- Born: 20 August 1984 (age 42); Bangkok, Thailand
- Other name: Boy (nickname)
- Education: Chulalongkorn University (Pharm.D.)
- Occupation: Actor
- Years active: 2006–present
- Known for: Wayupak Montra; Roy Marn; Kammathep Hunsa; Matuphoom Haeng Huachai
- Height: 1.80 m (5 ft 11 in)
- Relatives: Thana Chatborirak (brother); Pat Chatborirak (brother)

Pakorn Chatborirak (Thai: ปกรณ์ ฉัตรบริรักษ์; born 20 August 1984), nicknamed Boy (Thai: บอย), is a Thai actor.

== Early life and education ==
Pakorn Chatborirak was born in Bangkok to a Thai family of Teochew background. His mother was from Ang Thong Province, and his father died when he was a child. He has two brothers, Thana and Pat, both of whom are also models and actors.

Pakorn attended Assumption College for his primary and lower secondary education, before transferring to Triam Udom Suksa School for upper secondary. He later studied at the Faculty of Pharmaceutical Sciences at Chulalongkorn University, earning a BPharm degree. His first job was as a licensed pharmacist in Bangkok.

== Career ==
Chatborirak began working as a model, winning the CLEO Most Eligible Bachelor Award in 2008. His first film role was in the 2008 romantic comedy film 4 Romance, as part of the segment "SHY." He debuted on television in the drama series Fai Ruk Arsoon. He went on to hold the title role in the 2010 soap opera Wayupak Montra and also starred in the drama series Roy-Marn.

== Selected filmography ==
=== Film ===
List of film appearances, with year, title, and role shown
Year	Title	Role	Notes
2008	4 Romance	Durian	SHY segment
2010	The Dog	Bank	
2011	4 Psyco	Thada	
2011	Lao Wedding	Chen	
2016	I Love You Two	Jumnian	
2018	Gravity of Love	Zen	
2025	Flat Girls	Tong	

=== Television ===
List of television appearances, with year, title, and role shown
Year	Title	Role	Notes
2009	Fai Ruk Arsoon	Kaew	
2009	Hua Jai Song Pak	Don	
2010	3 Hua Jai	Chai	
2010	Thara Himalaya	Wayupak "Lom" Adisuan	
2010	Duang Jai Akkanee	Wayupak "Lom" Adisuan	
2010	Pathapee Leh Ruk	Wayupak "Lom" Adisuan	
2010	Wayupak Montra	Wayupak "Lom" Adisuan	
2011	Roy Marn	Mark	
2011	Sarm Noom Nuer Tong	Watchara	
2012	Waew Mayura	Sayumpoo Tossapol (Jack)	
2012	Tawan Chai Nai Marn Mak	Nopatee (Mek)	
2013	Porn Prom Onlaweng	Patthawee (Wee)	
2013	Maya Tawan	Police Inspector Hiran	
2013	Fah Krajang Dao	Police Inspector Hiran	
2014	Nai Suan Kwan	Trin (Tonmai)	
2015	Kaew Ta Waan Jai	Anil Warodom (Chang)	
2015	Luerd Mungkorn: Krating	Ah Long	
2015	Luerd Mungkorn: Hong	Ah Long	
2015	Nang Rai Tee Rak	Natee Singharit	
2015	Fai Lang Fai	Narut Dechalertrat	
2017	Kammathep Hunsa	Tim / Tornpitaya	
2017	Kamathep Ork Suek	Tim / Tornpitaya	
2017	Kammathep Jum Laeng	Tim / Tornpitaya	
2017	Sai Lub Jub Abb	Patee	
2018	Matuphoom Haeng Huachai	Major Techat Wasutraphaisan (Ben)	
2018	Mon Tra Lai Hong	Major Techat Wasutraphaisan (Ben)	
2018	Lom Phrai Pook Rak	Major Techat Wasutraphaisan (Ben)	
2018	Sen Son Kon Rak	Major Techat Wasutraphaisan (Ben)	
2018	Tai Peek Pak Sa	Major Techat Wasutraphaisan (Ben)	
2019	Plerng Naka	Tian	
2019	Plerng Ruk Plerng Kaen	Ampu	
2021	Barb Ayuttitham	Chittawan / Tawan	
2022	Sai Lub Lip Gloss	Teerapat Anantathanakarn (Tee)	
2024	Tomorrow and I (Anakhot)	Nont	Episode: "Black Sheep"

== Awards and nominations ==
Year	Result	Awards	Category	Nominated work	Note
2010	Nominated	Top Awards	Best Male Actor	Wayupak Montra	
2010	Nominated	Top Awards	Best Supporting Male Actor	Hua Jai Song Pak	
2010	Nominated	TV Gold Awards	Best Male Actor	Wayupak Montra	
2011	Nominated	Mekkala Awards of the 24th	Best Male Actor	Roy Marn	
2011	Won	MThai Top Talked-about Actor Awards	Top Male Talked-about Actor	—N/a	
2011	Won	Star Choice Awards	Charming Man	—N/a	Siam Entertainment
2011	Won	Next Icon	Next Male Icon	—N/a	Hamburger Magazine; 10-year anniversary
2012	Nominated	Kerd Award	Koo Kerd Award	—N/a	with Rasri Balenciaga
2012	Nominated	Kerd Award	Born Scorching Award	—N/a	
2012	Nominated	9 Entertainment Awards	Beloved Public Award	—N/a	
2012	Nominated	Siam Dara Star Awards	Best Male Actor, Major TV series	Wayupak Montra	
2012	Nominated	TVPOOL Star Party Awards	Charming Man	—N/a	TVPOOL; 23-year anniversary
2012	Won	Siam Dara Star Awards	Charming Man	—N/a	Siam Dara
2012	Won	TVPOOL Star Party Awards	Happy Family Award ("Chatborirak" Family)	—N/a	TVPOOL; 23-year anniversary
