= Matuphoom Haeng Huachai =

- Also known as: Heart Of The Motherland
- มาตุภูมิแห่งหัวใจ
- Genre: Action; Drama; Romantic comedy
- Written by: Manichan; Sakchai Kiatpanyaophat
- Directed by: Trakun Arunsawat
- Starring: Pakorn Chatborirak; Sirin Preedeeyanon; Shahkrit Yamnam; Sonia Couling; Manatnan Phanloetwongsakun
- Opening theme: Some day - Ten Thiraphat
- Country of origin: Thailand
- Original language: Thai
- No. of episodes: 8

Production
- Producers: Suangsuda Cholumpi; Chunlawut Cholumpi
- Production location: Thailand
- Running time: 150 minutes

Original release
- Network: Channel 3
- Release: 26 May – 10 June 2018

Related
- Mon Tra Lai Hong (2018); Lom Phrai Pook Rak (2018); Sen Son Kon Rak (2018); Tai Peek Pak Sa; (2018)

Matuphoom Haeng Huachai (Thai: มาตุภูมิแห่งหัวใจ; RTGS: matuphum haeng huachai) was a Thai action/drama TV series that aired on Channel 3, it starred Pakorn Chatborirak, Sirin Preedeeyanon, Shahkrit Yamnam, Sonia Couling and Manatnan Phanloetwongsakun. It's the first drama of project "My hero".

== Plot ==
Major Techat Wasutraphaisan (Pakorn Chatborirak) is undercover agent of Thai military special forces units. He was spying on General Dr. Thun Ou (Shahkrit Yamnam) who's suspected of being part of the Illegal drug trafficking of Saenpura state that produced drugs which were smuggled into Thailand. His mission involved undercovering as a business man and getting close to Thun Ou's wife, Madam Maytu A (Sonia Couling) that made Awassaya (Sirin Preedeeyanon), Techat's "to-be-fiancee" misunderstood. Techat tried to avoid Awassaya that can cause the whole mission to fail, but she didn't leave him alone.

== Cast ==
=== Main cast ===
- Pakorn Chatborirak as Major Techat Wasutraphaisan (Ben)
- Sirin Preedeeyanon as Awassaya Rueangritthikun (Mok)
- Shahkrit Yamnam as General Dr. Thun Ou
- Sonia Couling as Madam Maytu A
- Manatnan Phanloetwongsakun as Princess Konkaeo of Saenpura (Nunu)

=== Supporting cast ===
- Phenphet Phenkun as Prince Kaeoin of Saenpura
- Sarawut Matthong as Dean Segan
- Phenphak Sirikun as Techini Wasutraphaisan (Ni)
- Anan Bunnak as Lieutenant General Itsariya Phakdinarong (Big Ya)
- Aphasiri Nitiphon as Anima Rueangritthikun
- Thanayong Wongtrakun as Police Major General Mongkhon Rueangritthikun
- Visarut Hiranbuth as Methat Rueangritthikun
- Kanin Stanley as Adisak Buranadamrong (Ti)
- Sita Chutiphaworakan as Nila
- Siwath Khusakuntham as Phiraphon Aphisonwanit (P.)
- Stephanie Lerce as Andaman Rueangritthikun (Sea)

=== Guests ===
- Sinjai Plengpanich as Teacher Chanthra
- Warintorn Panhakarn as Teacher Patsakorn Wirayakan (Pat)
- Jaron Sorat as Itsara Ratchaphonkun
- Pongsakorn Mettarikanon as Khong Thamdee
- Louis Scott as Akhin Nopprasit
- Duanghathai Sathathip as Nid
- Taya Rogers as Hope Marrie Line
