= Pitchapa Phanthumchinda =

Thai actress and model (born 1992)

- พิชชาภา พันธุมจินดา
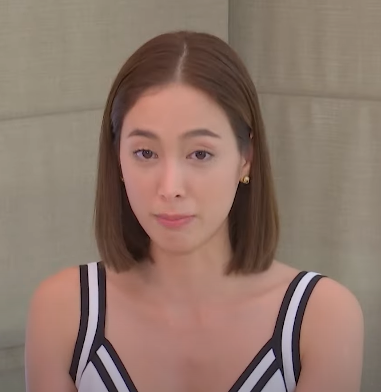
- Pitchapa in 2023
- Born: Rachaya Phanthumchinda; December 13, 1992 (age 33); Samut Prakan province, Thailand
- Other names: Pear (nickname); Pitchapa Phanthumchinda
- Education: Rangsit University (College of Communication Arts)
- Occupations: Actress; model; MC; YouTubers
- Years active: 2008–present
- Agent: Channel 3 (2013–present)
- Height: 1.70 m (5 ft 7 in)

Pitchapa Phanthumchinda (Thai: พิชชาภา พันธุมจินดา; born 13 December 1992), nicknamed Pear (Thai: แพร์) is a Thai model and actress.

== Life ==
=== Early life and education ===
Pitchapa was born on December 13, 1992, in Samut Prakan province in Thailand. She graduated from secondary education Assumption College, Samut Prakan and graduated with a bachelor's degree from the Faculty of Communication Arts Rangsit University (Film and Video).

=== Career ===
Pitchapa entered the film industry after working in modeling, appearing in music videos and advertisements. She first appeared in an advertisement for Beauty Buffet, followed by magazine shoots. After appearing in a shoot for the magazine After, she was cast in a drama. After that, there was the first drama with Channel 3 by Pooh Dee E Sarn.

== Personal life ==
Pitcha identifies as a Christian.

== Filmography ==
=== Film ===
Year	Title	Role	Notes
2008	Pirate of the Lost Sea	Yathip	Support Role
2010	Maythawee	Student	Support Role
2016	The Greatest Love	Jane	Short Film
2019	Necromancer 2	Nao	

=== Television series ===
Year	Title	Role
2013	Club Friday The Series Season 2 (Ep. 5)	Chaaim (Aim)
2013	Pooh Dee E Sarn	Teangeon
2014	Suey Rai Sai Lub	Puk
2014	Pope Rak	Napdao Siriphothima
2015	Fai Lang Fai	Sirintaan Dechalertrat / Lookyee
2016	Pirun Pram Rak	Janis Hui
2016	Duang Jai Pisuth	Ladamanee
2017	The Cupids Series: Kammathep Sorn Kol	Rarin
2017	Duen Pradab Dao	Jitjarung
2018	Kom Faek	Dok Mai
2018	Sanae Rak Nang Cin	Vicky
2018	The Crown Princess	Matmee
2018	Game Sanaeha	Penpannee
2018	My Hero Series: Lines of Trickery Love	Ticha
2018	Duang Jai Nai Fai Nhao	Jinda Phatthayothin
2019	Krong Kam	Philai
2019	Lub Luang Jai	Vee
2020	My Husband in Law	Kawfang
2020	Payakorn Sorn Ruk	Rinradi
2020	Watsana Rak	Phansa Khanthong
2021	Mia Jum Pen	Yardfah Akkaramontri
2021	Are We Alright?	Venice
2022	Poisonous Passion	Pimpaka
2023	You Touched My Heart	Phimrata Changwangprawas
2023	Devil-in-Law	Netdao
2023	Eclipse of the Heart	Grace
2024	The Invincible	Janthra
2024	Love at First Night	Ink
2024	Don't Come Home	Fah
TBA	Jai Khang Jao	
TBA	Chao Khun Phi Kap I Nang Kham Duang	

=== Music video appearances ===
- "เรื่องจริงเรื่องสุดท้าย" (The Truth is the Last Problem) Jaruwat Cheawaram
- "พรุ่งนี้ยังมีเหมือนเดิม" (Tomorrow) Knomjean feat.WAii
- "พูดไม่ค่อยถูก" (I Don't Speak Very Well) ABnormal

== MC ==
Online

- 2021−2023 : YouTube ThreeSis Thesis with Prima Bhuncharoen, Karanchida Khumsuwan

== Awards and nominations ==
Year	Award	Category	Nominated work	Result	Ref.
2015	Sisanbantheing Award 2015	Female Star Branch of the Year 2015	Fai Lang Fai	Won	
2019	4th Nakorn Award	Best Female Actress of the Year	Krong Kam	Won	
2019	TV Gold Awards	Best Supporting Actress	Krong Kam	Nominated	
2019	World SDGs Award 2019 / The Best World SDGs Award 2019	Best Supporting Actress	Krong Kam	Won	
2019	2nd Asian Academy Creative Awards	Best Supporting Actress	Krong Kam	Nominated	
2019	Sisanbantheing Award 2019	Special trick of the year	Krong Kam	Won	
2020	16th Kom Chad Luek Award	Best Supporting Actress (Television)	Krong Kam	Won	
2020	11th Nataraj Awards	Best Supporting Actress	Krong Kam	Won	
