= Pongsakorn Mettarikanon =

Thai actor

- พงศกร เมตตาริกานนท์
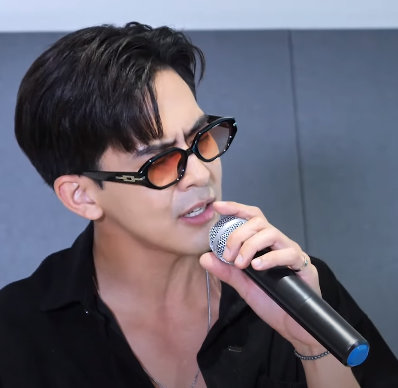
- Born: Pongsakorn Mettarikanon; 25 February 1992 (age 34); Amnat Charoen, Thailand
- Other name: Toey
- Education: Bangkok University
- Occupations: Actor; YouTuber; Businessman
- Years active: 2010–present
- Height: 1.85 m (6 ft 1 in)

Pongsakorn Mettarikanon (Thai: พงศกร เมตตาริกานนท์; born 25 February 1992), professionally known as Toey (เต้ย), is a Thai actor, YouTuber and businessman. He is best known for his leading roles in the television series Khun Chai Ratchanon (2013), Bang Rajan (2015), The Cupids: Hidden Love (2017), My Hero (2018), Plerng Phrang Thian (2019), and the film The Paradise of Thorns (2024).

In 2026, he was cast as Jirat in the WeTV original boys' love crime fantasy series NOUR, marking his first leading role in the genre.

== Filmography ==
=== Television ===
Year	Title	Role	Category	Network / Platform
2013	Khun Chai Ratchanon	Jumphon Wongsawan (Bak Choi)	Supporting role	Channel 3
2015	Bang Rajan	Thap	Main role	Channel 3
2016	Kam Lai Mas	Inthawong Suphamat / Prince Direk Suphamat	Main role	Channel 3
2016	Pantai Norasingh	Pantai Norasingh	Main role	Workpoint TV
2017	The Cupids: Sorn Ruk Kammathep	Angkoon Mahakitpaisarn (At)	Main role	Channel 3
2018	My Hero: Matupoom Haeng Huachai	Khong Thammadi	Main role	Channel 3
2018	Prakasit Kammathep	Hemant Chamchongkit	Main role	Channel 3
2019	Plerng Phrang Thian	Chao Noi Thewarit / In Wiangraming	Main role	Channel 3
2019	My Love from Another Star	Toeyphong	Guest role	Channel 3
2020	Fa Fak Rak	Kimhan Traikit	Main role	Channel 3
2020	Kwam Song Cham See Jang	Phuwadon Chalermphiphat	Main role	Channel 3
2022	San Sanaeha	Muenmile Sitthiwat	Main role	Channel 3
2022	Buppha Roi Rai	Chinnakrit Kiattisila	Main role	Channel 3
2024	Mue Prap Maha Ut	Mai / Suea Phat	Main role	Channel 3
2025	Top Form	Jade	Supporting role	WeTV
2026	Pin Anong	Chalit Thamrongrat (Yai)	Main role	Mono 29
2026	Si Suea Daen Siam: Fai Lang Fai	Suea Bun	Main role	Mono 29
2026	Banlang Marn	San	Main role	Mono 29
2026	NOUR	Jirat	Main role	WeTV

== Awards and nominations ==
Year	Award	Category	Work	Result
2013	Golden Television Awards	Best Supporting Actor	Khun Chai Ratchanon	Nominated
2013	Daradaily The Great Awards	Most Colorful Actor of the Year		Won
2015	See San Entertainment Awards	Rising Male Star	Bang Rajan	Won
2015	Maya Awards	Favorite Rising Actor	Bang Rajan	Won
2016	Kom Chad Luek Awards	Popular Actor	Bang Rajan	Nominated
2016	Maya Awards	Favorite Leading Actor	Kam Lai Mas	Nominated
2018	Kazz Awards	Popular Male Actor	The Cupids: Hidden Love	Won
2019	Kazz Awards	Popular Male Actor		Won
2020	Maya Awards	Favorite Supporting Actor	Plerng Phrang Thian	Nominated
