= Ekkaphong Jongkesakorn =

Thai actor (born 1983)

- เอกพงศ์ จงเกษกรณ์
- Born: 30 January 1983 (age 43); Uthai Thani Province, Thailand
- Other names: First (เฟิสท์)
- Education: Chiang Mai University; Chulalongkorn University
- Occupation: Actor
- Years active: 2010–present
- Agent: Channel 3 (2010–present)
- Height: 1.89 m (6 ft 2 1/2 in)
- Spouse: Karnsinee Suksai (m. 2018)
- Children: 1

Ekkaphong Jongkesakorn (Thai: เอกพงศ์ จงเกษกรณ์) born on 30 January 1983, is a Thai actor.

== Early life and education ==
Ekkaphong Jongkesakorn was born on 30 January 1983 in Uthai Thani Province. His father has a career as a supervisor, while his mother is a teacher. He graduated from secondary education at Nakhon Sawan School; with a bachelor's degree from the Faculty of Engineering Chiang Mai University (Mechanical Engineering), and with a master's degree from the Faculty of Engineering Chulalongkorn University (Industrial Engineering) Academic Year 2010 with cumulative GPA of 3.81

== Career ==
Ekkaphong was discovered in Chiang Mai by P' A Supachai. P' A somehow got his number and had to call many times before they came to an agreement. P'A took photos for his profile and submitted it to Channel 3 . They then contacted him to sign a contract and he received his first drama. Wan Jai Gub Nai Jom Ying with Chalida Vijitvongthong.

== Personal life ==
Ekkaphong is married to Karnsinee Suksai, a girlfriend outside the entertainment industry. His wife gave birth to a son named Nong Pam on 19 October 2018.

== Filmography ==
=== Television series ===
Year	Title	Role	Network	Notes	
2010	Wan Jai Gub Nai Jom Ying	Aswin Akarasiri / Win	Channel 3		
2011	Pim Mala	Anusorn / Nu	Channel 3		
2011	Roy Marn	Capt. Arthit Suriyo / Sunny	Channel 3		
2011	Duang Taa Nai Duang Jai	Saht	Channel 3		
2011	Banteuk Karm Piang Kham Diew 14		Channel 3	short film	
2012	Tawan Yod Rak	Phakin	Channel 3		
2012	Baan Nok Kao Krung	ML Cheyphiman / Jack	Channel 3		
2012	Raak Boon	Lieutenant Nawat	Channel 3		
2013	Ruk Karm Sen	Shahkrit	Channel 3		
2014	Nang Rai Summer	Tonnam	Channel 3		
2014	Kularb Sorn Klin	Sun	Channel 3		
2014	Raak Boon 2	Lieutenant Nawat	Channel 3		
2015	Sapai Sai Lub	Paravee Itinan / Mr. V / V / Judge	Channel 3		
2016	Mue Prab Sai Daew	Phuwat / Phu	Channel 3		
2017	Mia Luang	Janejob	Channel 3		
2017	Fan Rak Fan Salai	Chang Yi Chen (Hia Chang)	Channel 3		
2018	Nueng Dao Fah Diew	Hsinbyushin	Channel 3		
2018	Dung Prom Likit Ruk	P'Ra Wongjun	Channel 3		
2018	Chart Suer Pun Mungkorn	Chaiyuth / Pi Ai	Channel 3		
2019	Tukta Phee	Thada	Channel 3	Cameo	
2019	Dao Lhong Fah	Sutee	Channel 3		
2020	Pom Arthun	Pakorn	Channel 3		
2022	Pom Sanaeha	Dr.Sakdisant Naruebodeejaruk (Sant)	Channel 3		
2022	Aom Fah Oab Din	Phasut Panjasingkhon (Flight Lieutenant/Captain)	Channel 3	Cameo	
2022	2023	Khaen	Channel 3	Poll	Cameo
2024	Waowon Rak	M.R.W. Parametthiwat (Khun Chai Por)	Channel 3	Cameo	
2024	Lom Len Fai		Channel 3	Cameo	
2024	Duangjai Deva Phrom : Kwanruetai		Channel 3		
2025	Nam Peung Kom (2025)	Santhad Wisetchaiyo (Thad)	Channel 3		
20			Channel 3		
