= Krissada Pornweroj =

Thai actor and model (born 1977)

- กฤษฎา พรเวโรจน์
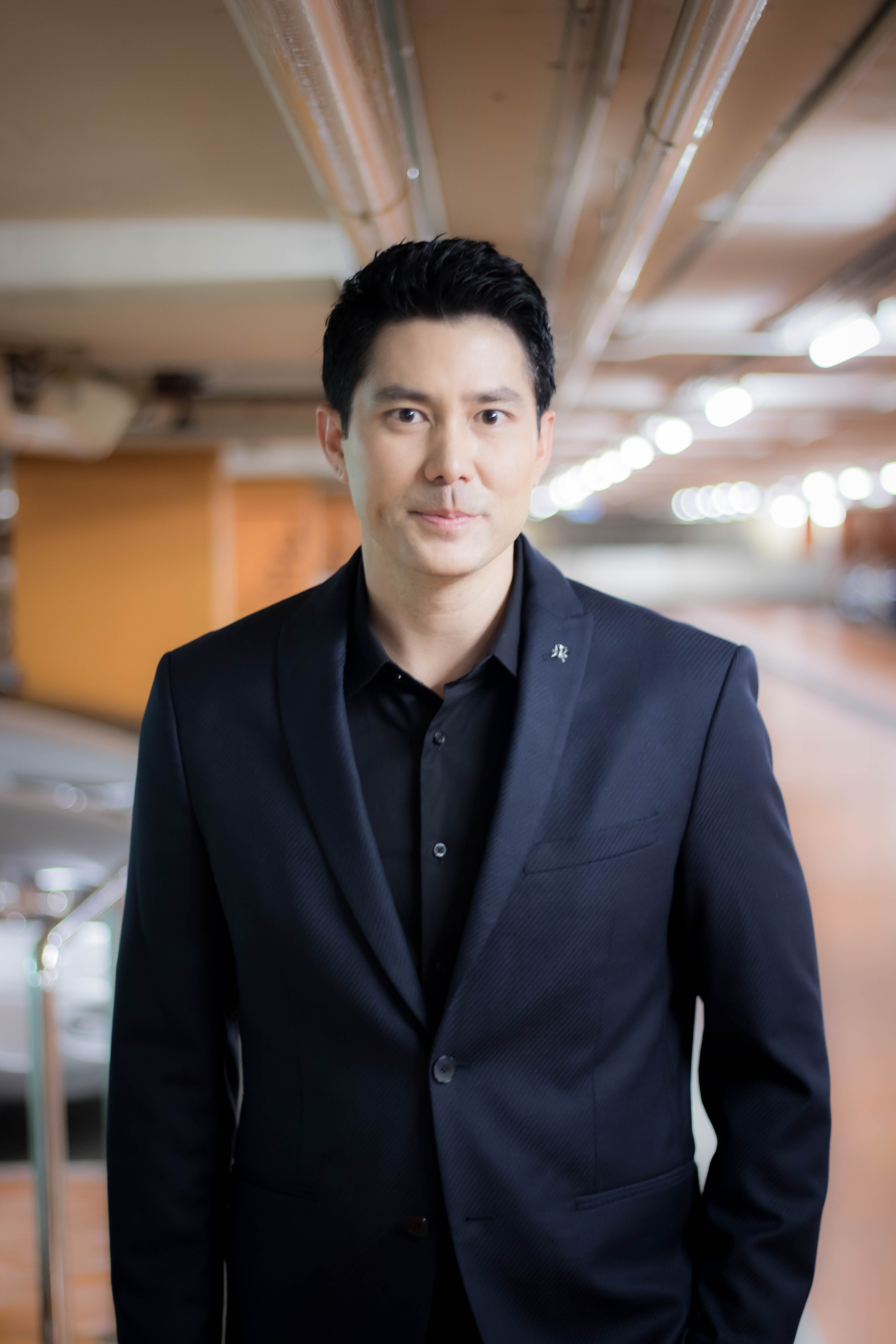
- Born: Krissada Pornweroj; June 1, 1977 (age 48); Bangkok, Thailand
- Other names: Smart; Mart
- Occupation: Actor
- Years active: 2005 – present
- Height: 1.77 m (5 ft 9 1/2 in)

Krissda Pornveroj (Thai: กฤษฎา พรเวโรจน์; born 1 June 1, 1977, in Bangkok, Thailand) is a Thai actor.

== Career ==
He starred alongside Ann Thongprasom in the lakorn Likit Gammatep in 2007 where he played Thongprasom's "stepson" later husband. By 2012, he then again reunited with Thongprasom in the horror/drama/romance lakorn Qi Pao. By 2013, he was set to be in the lakorn Wiang Roy Dao, together with Nataporn Tameeruk.

He is seen on Channel 3.

=== Filmography ===
==== Television ====
Television
Year	Title	English Title	Role	Network	Notes	With
2005	Kularb See Dum	Black Rose	N/A	Channel 3	Main Cast	Mew Lalita Panyopas
2006	Weerakam Tham Puer Tur	N/A	N/A	Channel 3	Main Cast	Mew Lalita Panyopas
2006	Sao Pern Jao Saneh	Clumsy Charming Lady	N/A	Channel 3	Lead Role	Sirapan Vattanajinda
2007	Meuh Dok Rak Ban	When Dahlia Bloom	Karn	Channel 3	Lead Role	Taksaorn Paksukcharoen
2007	Likit Gammatep	The Fate Cupid	Pinitnai "Nit"	Channel 3	Lead Role	Ann Thongprasom
2008	Yuttakarn Huk Karn Thong	Golden Shelf	Krit	Channel 3	Lead Role	Sririta Jensen
2008	Nimit Marn	Vision Obstruction	Tawarat	Channel 3	Lead Role	Witaya Wasukraipaisarn and Laila Boonyasak
2008	Sapai Look Toong	Country Daughter-In-Law	Artee	Channel 3	Lead Role	Janie Tienphosuwan
2009	Mae Ka Khanom Wan	The Dessert Girl	Wacharawat	Channel 3	Lead Role	Khemupsorn Sirisukha
2009	Dong Poo Dee	Blue Blood Territory	Chartsiam Surabordin	Channel 3	Lead Role	Nattaporn Temeerak
2009	Plerng See Rong	Rainbow Flame	Tin	Channel 3	Lead Role	Susira Nanna
2010	Wan Jai Gub Nai Jom Ying	Miss Sweetheart and Mr. Arrogant	Totsawin "Tot"	Channel 3	Lead Role	Peeranee Kongthai
2011	Pla Lhai Paai Daeng	A Brand New Eel	Parit	Channel 3	Lead Role	Khemupsorn Sirisukha
2011	Tard Ruk	Slave of Love	Prince Darbprabsatroo	Channel 3	Lead Role	Khemupsorn Sirisukha
2011	Ruk Pathiharn	Miracle of Love	Chaiburahtut	Channel 3	Lead Role	Kimberley Anne Woltemas
2012	Qi Pao	Qi Pao	Jao Ming Tian/Khun Chai Rong	Channel 3	Lead Role	Ann Thongprasom
2014	Wiang Roy Dao	TBA	M.R.Siptit Welumas	Channel 3	Lead Role	Nattaporn Temeerak
2014	Fai Ruk Plerng Kaen	Love on Fire	Yotsaral	Channel 3	Lead Role	Tisha Tantiprasut
2014	Sam Bai Mai Thao	TBA	Pisit	Channel 3	Lead Role	Pream Ranida
2017	Mia Luang 2017	The Main Wife	Dr. Aniroot	Channel 3	Lead Role	TBA

== See also ==
- List of Thai male actors
