= Sai Tarn Hua Jai =

2017 Thai television series

- Genre: Melodrama
- Based on: Sai Tarn Hua Jai
- Written by: Wassana
- Screenplay by: 2017 : Kon Kean Ngao
- Directed by: 2017 : Thapakorn Dissayanan; 2017 : Chana Kraprayoon
- Creative director: 2017 : Jetsada Jandra
- Starring: 2017: James Ma; Chalida Vijitvongthong; Carissa Springett; Alexander Rendell; Prima Bhuncharoen
- Theme music composer: 2017: Ruengkit Yongpiyakul; Panya Pakoonpanya; Narongvit Techathanawat; Poramet Mueansanit
- Opening theme: 2017 "If they love" – James Ma
- Ending theme: 2017 "Stream in the heart" – Suweera Boonrod, Arisa Homgroon
- Country of origin: Thailand
- Original language: Thai
- No. of episodes: 2017 : 11

Production
- Executive producer: 2017 : Nattaphong Mueanprasittiwech
- Editors: 2017; Dog Back Dee Co., Ltd.
- Camera setup: 2017: Sainan Somrod; Theerawut Suktanhom; Wongsakorn Pornpipat
- Running time: 2017 : ~150 minutes
- Production companies: 2017; Maker Group Co., Ltd.

Original release
- Network: Channel 7 HD
- Release: 2000
- Network: Channel 3 HD
- Release: November 1 – December 6, 2017

Related
- 2017 : Seesun Bun Therng; 2560 : 3D News

Sai Tarn Hua Jai is a Thai television melodrama, based on a novel of the same name which was written by Wassana. It aired the first time in 2000 via Channel 7. It starred Monton Jira, Isariya Saisanan, May Fuangarom, Ramona Zanolari Barnes and was directed by Thapakorn Dissayanan.

Later in 2017, it was remade by Maker Group Co., Ltd., starring James Ma, Chalida Vijitvongthong, Carissa Springett, Alexander Rendell and Prima Bunchareon. It aired on Channel 3 on every Wednesday–Thursday, 20:20–22:50 (UTC+07.00) since November 1 – December 6, 2017. After that, it re-ran every Monday–Friday at 11:45–13:45 (TST), July 18 – August 6, 2019.

== Plot ==
Narang is an orphan who was adopted by M.C. Manthep Jongsawas as the palace's inhabitant. He was raised by Prakeong, the old servant and wife of M.C. Manthep. Prakeong also has a daughter with Manthep, Lamun, whom Narang treats as a sister. But she secretly has a crush on him.

M.C. Patawee Jongsawas, the only daughter of M.C. Manthep who is the pride of him. She and Narang used to have good relations, but M.C. Manthep never accepted Narang, so he sent him to study abroad. When Narang is back, he found that Jongsawas is in debt and the hotel of the family, The Grand Royal, also has a problem. Narang decided to save the hotel for paying an owes of favor with M.C. Manthep. As a result, he meets Sirikanya again. She applies to work for the hotel as a secretary of the stockholder. Sirikanya is brave, but poor, and living with her grandmother.

Kiattisak, the creditor of M.C. Manthep, forces M.R. Patawee to marry him to pay debt. She refuses because she never forgot Narang and keeps eliminating the women who are close to him, especially Sirikanya. It makes Kiattisak knows that M.R. Patawee loves Narang, so he started to attack him and everyone who dissatisfy M.R. Patawee.

Prakeong doses everything to makes Lamun gets the rights that she should receive as one of M.C. Manthep's daughters. And also supported the marry between Lamun and Narang because he is the only man that she trusted. While, Teacher Sawad, who is the colleague of Lamun, has a crush on her secretly, always being on her side and being an consultant for her.

== Cast ==
Years	2000	2017
Channels	Channel 7	Channel 3
Making companies	—N/a	Maker Group Co., Ltd.
Screenplay	—N/a	Khon Kean Ngao
Directors	Thapakorn Dissayanan	Chana Kraprayoon
Characters	Main cast	
Narang Jongsawas Na Ayutthaya (2000); Narang Jongsawas / Na (2017)	Monton Jira	James Ma
Sirikanya (2000); Sirikanya / Kanya (2017)	Isariya Saisanan	Chalida Vijitvongthong
M.R. Patawee Jongsawas / Khun Ying Patawee	Ramona Zanolari Barnes	Carissa Springett
M.R. Lamai Jongsawas (2000); Lamun Kerdkuna (2017)	May Fuangarom	Prima Bhuncharoen
Kru Sawad Sartprasit (Thai: ครู, romanized: Kru, lit. 'Teacher')		Alexander Rendell
Kiattisak Suptanasarnpaiboon		Rangsit Sirananont
M.C. Manthep Jongsawas		Chartayodom Hiranyasthiti
Prakeong		Sueangsuda Lawanprasert
Characters	Supporting cast	
Srinuan (Sirikanya's grandmother)		Tassaneewan Saeneewong Na Ayutthaya
Ong (Narang's friend)		Kanin Stanley
Sunanta (Ong's mother)		Penpak Sirikul
Wichian		Parin Wikran
Pairoj		Kosawit Piyasakulkaew
Whan		Ratri Witawat
Uncle Chom		Krailart Kriangkrai
Chuen		Wimolpan Chaleejangharn
Seeda		Budsaraporn Hongtanyasawad
Characters	Cameo	
Khun Ying Kae Kai		Mayurachat Mueanprasittiwech
Yingyot		Songsit Roongnophakunsri
Kamtorn Suptanasarnpaiboon (Kiattisak's father)		Thanongsak Suphakarn
Mother of Teacher Sawas		Nattha Loid
Mother of M.R. Patawee		Wichuda Pindum
Jaidee (Sunanta's secretary)		Janya Thanasawangkul
Kanok-orn		Lalita Paisarn
Teacher Orawan / Toi		Thijipat Srikongnattakul
Kong		Nattanont Pinrojkirati
Narang Jongsawas (child)		Krittanat Na Lamliang
M.R. Patawee Jongsawas (child)		Marilin Kate Guardner
Lamun Kerdkuna (child)		Chananya Lerdwattanamonkol

== Original soundtracks ==
=== 2017 ===
No.	Title	Lyrics	Music	Artist(s)	Length
1.	"If they loves" (Thai: ถ้าคนจะรัก)	Montawan Sriwichian	Ruengkit Yongpiyakul	James Ma	3:40
2.	"Stream in the heart" (Thai: สายน้ำในหัวใจ)	Panya Pakoonpanya	Panya Pakoonpanya	Suweera Boonrod; Arisa Homgroon	5:08
3.	"When it's me" (Thai: เมื่อไหร่ถึงจะเป็นฉัน)	Narongvit Taechatanawat	Poramet Mueansanit	Arisa Homgroon	4:01
Total length:					12:49

== Ratings ==
Red color — the number of the highest rating
Blue color — the number of the lowest rating

episodes	Aired on	Reatings
1	1 November 2017	2.8
2	2 November 2017	3.0
3	8 November 2017	2.7
4	9 November 2017	2.7
5	15 November 2017	2.4
6	16 November 2017	2.3
7	22 November 2017	2.7
8	23 November 2017	3.3
9	29 November 2017	3.6
10	30 November 2017	3.9
11	6 December 2017	4.5
Average	—	4.47
