= Samee (2013 TV series) =

Thai television series

- Promotional poster
- Thai: สามี
- Genre: Drama, romance
- Written by: Padcha
- Screenplay by: Songpunnanot (Thai: สองปุณณณฐ)
- Directed by: Metee Jarenpong
- Starring: Warintorn Panhakarn; Ranida Techasit
- Country of origin: Thailand
- Original language: Thai
- No. of seasons: 1
- No. of episodes: 14 (TV); 25 (YouTube)

Production
- Executive producer: Jariya Anfone
- Running time: 110 minutes (TV); 60.42 minutes (YouTube)
- Production company: Maker J

Original release
- Network: Channel 3
- Release: November 21, 2013 – January 9, 2014

Samee (Thai: สามี, romanized: S̄āmī, lit. 'Husband') is a Thai television series produced by Maker J, remake of the 2000 Thai television series of the same name. It aired on Channel 3 from November 21, 2013 to January 9, 2014, on Wednesdays and Thursdays for 14 episodes. It was also re-released on Channel 3 official YouTube account as 25 episodes.

== Plot ==
Proud girl Rasika isn't happy to learn that her mother is going to marry Jao Sua, a Chinese-Thai businessman she believes responsible for the death of her father, to save their home from seizure due to debts. The girl's uncle Prasit, however, wants the money straight from Rasika and is willing to kill her to acquire the palace, so Jao Sua is forced to marry her to his son Rab.

== Characters ==
- Warintorn Panhakarn as Rab Limwatanatawornkul
- Preem Ranida Techasit as M.R. Rasika Prakakiat "Khunying Ai"
- Ice Apissada Kreurkongka as Surisong Prakardkiatsak, Prasit's daughter
- Mint Nutwara Vongvasana as Ronglai Limwatanatawornkul, Rab's sister
- Thanakrit Panichwid as Pattawee Prakardkiatsak "Wee", Rasika's friend
- Alex Rendell as Ram Limwatanatawornkul, Rab's younger brother
- Primorata Dejudom as Sirisopa, Rab's ex-girlfriend
- Orn Patteera Sarutipongpokin as Rarin Lin Watanatawornkul
- Jieb Pijitra as Rong Limwatanatawakorn
- Namfon Sueangsuda Lawanprasert as Linda, Ram's mother
- Jariya Anfone as Mom Rattanawalee "Walee", Rasika's mother
- Dilok Thong wattana as Reaw Limwatanatawornkul "Jao Sua", Rab's father
- Ton Jakkrit Ammarat as Prasit Prakardkiatsak, Rasika's uncle

== Original soundtrack ==
No.	Title	Lyrics	Music	Artist	Length
1.	"Rak Tur Tang Cheevid"	Fongbeer	Patiwed Uthaichaleim	Zeal
2.	"Pood Arai Mai Dai Sak Yang"	Fongbeer	Patiwed Uthaichaleim	Film Bongkod
3.	"Klai"	Sifah	Chawin Chitsomboon	Thanakrit Panichwid
