= Doctor Detective (Thai TV series) =

2023 Thai television series

- สืบลับหมอระบาด
- Genre: Medical drama
- Written by: Piyaporn Wayuparb
- Screenplay by: Piyaporn Wayuparb; Krit Mongkolkasem
- Directed by: Nitiwat Chonlawanitsiri
- Starring: Nadech Kugimiya; Kimberley Anne Woltemas; Alex Rendell; Phurita Suphinchumpoo
- Country of origin: Thailand
- Original language: Thai
- No. of episodes: 20

Production
- Producer: Phiyada Jutharattanakul
- Production locations: Ministry of Health; Department of Medical Services; Department of Disease Control; Department of Medical Sciences; Department of Health; Movenpick Hotel
- Production company: Magic If One Entertainment

Original release
- Network: Channel 3 HD
- Release: August 21 – October 24, 2023

Doctor Detective (Thai: สืบลับหมอระบาด) is a Thai medical drama television series produced by Magic If One Entertainment. The series is based on a novel by Piyaporn Wayuparp, and the cast includes Nadech Kugimiya, Kimberley Anne Woltemas, Purita Suphinchumphu and Alex Rendell along with Nipaporn Thitithanakarn, Wisarut Hiranbut, Nopphawit Thaitae, Sanya Kunakorn, Songsit Roongnophakunsri, Kwanruedee Klomklom, Polwat Manuprasert, Sarut Wichitranond and Niti Chaichitathorn.

== Production ==
Doctor Detective made a fitting for the cast's clothes on Thursday, March 24, 2022, with Nithiwat Cholvanichsiri as the director of the drama.

Phiyada Jutharattanakul, the producer of the drama, said that it was based on the current epidemic situation. The series is intended to let viewers know more about the profession of doctors, and each character will have different clues. Until Monday, October 10, 2022, the first teaser trailer for Doctor Detective was released along with other dramas. And the last queue was filmed on Sunday, February 26, 2023, which is expected to be broadcast in the second half of the year. Then, on Thursday, July 27, 2023, a sacrifice ceremony was held for the drama "Doctor Detective" officially at Channel 3 studio, Nong Khaem.

== Cast ==
| name | character | character details | notes |
Main cast
| Nadech Kugimiya | Doctor Khunkhao Worawudthichai (Khun) | | |
| Kimberley Anne Woltemas | Jenjira Jeerapong (Jen) | Journalist, which was Doctor Ram's daughter | |
| Alex Rendell | Doctor Theethatch (Thee) | | |
| Phurita Suphinchumpoo | Mintra Pornsatid (Min) | | |
Supporting cast
| Nopphawit Thaitae | Meksaphon kiadkornsakun (Maggie) | Jenjira's fellow cameraman | |
| Nipaporn Thitithanakarn | Benjawan Adchariyatham (Ben) | Doctor Khunkhao's work fellow | |
| Wisarut Hirunbut | Akpad Praseidchan (Aek) | Doctor Khunkhao's work fellow | |
| Niti Chaichitathorn | Lersak Dedjumphon (Jaa) | | |
| Kathaleeya McIntosh | Radakarn (Da) | | |
| Songsit Roongnophakunsri | Doctor Ram Jeerapong | Jenjira's father | |
| Sanya Kunakorn | Doctor Arkorn Hankarun | Doctor Khunkhao's Chief | |
| Sarut Vichitrananda | Nobdanai Saranpipad (Nob) | | |
| Kwanruedee Klomklom | Doctor Khrongkwan Worawudthichai | | |
| Thanayong Wongtrakul | Thaned Pornsatid | Mintra's father | |
Cameo cast
| Polwat Manuprasert | Doctor Sek Worawudthichai | | |
| Sira Patrat | | Doctor Theethatch's father | |
| Suchada Poonpattanasuk | | | |
