= Nuer Mek 2 =

- Also known as: Beyond Comparison 2: Sorcerous Buster
- เหนือเมฆ 2 มือปราบจอมขมังเวทย์
- Starring: Prin Suparat; Chalida Vijitvongthong; Pongpat Wachirabunjong; Chatchai Plengpanich
- Country of origin: Thailand
- Original language: Thai
- No. of episodes: 9 (originally at 12)

Production
- Producer: Chatchai Plengpanitch
- Production location: Thailand
- Running time: Friday - Sunday

Original release
- Network: Channel 3
- Release: 14 December – 30 December 2012

Related
- Nuer Mek

Nuer Mek 2 (Thai: เหนือเมฆ 2 มือปราบจอมขมังเวทย์; RTGS: Nuea Mek Song: Mue Prap Chom Khamang Wet) was a Thai action/drama lakorn that aired on Channel 3 and the sequel to 2010s Nuer Mek, it starred Prin Suparat and Chalida Vijitvongthong. It was terminated by Channel 3 on 4 January 2013 due to "inappropriate contents," and was replaced by Raeng Prathana on the same night.

== Synopsis ==
The story revolves around Police Sub Lieutenant Saengkla Aphichai (Prin Suparat) a police officer who grew up in the orphanage foundation where he grew up with Namsai Pumipak (Kamolned Ruengsri)a young woman who has fallen in love with him without him knowing. Saengkla had received an assignment from Police Major Rawi Ingkhaphat (Sonia Couling) the commanding officer to find ruins that disappeared unfortunate aggressive and criminal plundering occurs. Thrisuwachara, Anantakata, Jukranarai, and Sungchayomkol are one of the four divine weapons that appeared in the ancient and holy textbook of divine weapons.

Saengkla has work with Sergeant Saming (Pongpat Wachirabunjong) whose personality is completely different with Saengkla. Saengkla bases his judgement on scientific principles, while Sergeant Saming in omens and black magic. There were plans to steal the diamonds of Sungchayomkol from a diamonds display anniversary; Saengkla, Sergeant Saming, and Khram (Pasut Banyam) will work together in order to interfere the plan.

The thieves that planned to steal the diamond of Sungchayomkol turned out to be enemies of black powers, no bullets or weapons could harm them except Sergeant Saming's bullet. Their fight with the thieves caused Khram to be heavily wounded almost to death. He had to be sent to the hospital, but Kram suddenly became a maniac and robbed the diamonds from the vault inside the office and fatally wounded Thorung (Rachavin Vongviriya) and followed her by committing suicide.

Saengkla on the other hand asked Dr. Praepailin Nawiyakul (Chalida Vijitvongthong) to perform a detailed examination of Khram and Thorung's death.

== Cast ==
- Prin Suparat as Police Sub Lieutenant Saengkla Aphichai - Operative Strategy Unit from the Office of Special Investigation.
- Chalida Vijitvongthong as Dr. Praepailin Nawiyakul - Chief Director of the Institute of Forensic Tech in the office of Special Investigation.
- Pongpat Wachirabunjong as Sergeant Major Saming / Mongkon - Special spy from the Office of Special Investigation TSI.
- Chatchai Plengpanich as Vinyoo - Master of sorcery and the main antagonist of the story, later revealed to be the one who killed Saengkla's father.
- Jaron Sorat as Komsorn Suriyorn - Personal secretary of the Prime minister and Praepailin's ex-boyfriend.
- Kamolned Ruengsri as Namsai Pumipak - Skynews Network reporter and Saengkla's childhood friend.
- Sinjai Plengpanich as Napha Tanrath - Previous commander in chief of the Office of Special Investigation and Dr. Meka Tanranth's wife

=== Supporting cast ===
- Dom Hetrakul as Chak Amatarittha - Vice Prime minister
- Sonia Couling as Police Major Rawi Ingkhaphat - Commander in chief of the Office of Special Investigation and Praepailin's step-sister
- Kriangkrai Unhanan as Captain Inthanon
- Phenphak Sirikun as Phetthae Nawiyakun - Praepailin's mother
- Somchit Chongchoho as Sergeant Wan
- Thuarae Choenyim as Haep

=== Guest ===
- Pasut Banyam as Khram
- Rachavin Vongviriya as Thorung
- Nopphon Komanchun as Dr. Mekha Thanrat - Prime minister
- Chakrit Yamnam as Phayu - Dr. Meka Tanranth's son
- Khemupsorn Sirisukha as Fa - Napha's daughter

== Awards ==
| Year | Award/Recognition | Category | Nominee | Result |
|---|---|---|---|---|
| 2013 | Mekala Awards | Best Lakorn that Promotes Moral Behavior | Nuer Mek 2 | Won |
| 2013 | Clean Bouquet of the Year | Actress of the Year | Chalida Vijitvongthong | Won |
