= Wan Jai Gub Nai Jom Ying =

- Also known as: Miss Sweetheart and Mr. Arrogant
- หวานใจนายจอมหยิ่ง
- Starring: Krissada Pornweroj; Peeranee Kongthai; Rasri Balenciaga; Louis Scott; Chalida Vijitvongthong; Ekkaphong Jongkesakorn
- Country of origin: Thailand
- Original language: Thai
- No. of episodes: 14

Production
- Producer: Makers Group
- Production location: Thailand

Original release
- Network: Channel 3
- Release: 22 May 2010 – June 2010

Wan Jai Gub Nai Jom Ying (Thai: หวานใจนายจอมหยิ่ง; RTGS: Wan Chai Kap Nai Chom Ying) is a 2010 drama/comedy/romance Thai lakorn that is aired on Channel 3. It starred Krissada Pornveroj, Louis Scott, Ekkaphong Jongkesakorn, Peeranee Kongthai, Rasri Balenciaga, and Chalida Vijitvongthong.

== Synopsis ==
The story revolves around three cousins Thotsawin (Krissada Pornweroj), Chatsawin (Louis Scott), and Atsawin (Ekkaphong Jongkesakorn) who are heirs of the 5 star hotel called Siamtara. Atsawin is a well-mannered businessman who manages the marketing department for the hotel restaurant, he is also calm, sincere, and a good guy, but he has one problem - love, because he can't admit his feelings for the girl he likes. On the other hand Chatsawin is the playboy of the family who cares little of work, and is more interested in women and parties. Chatsawin's mother pushes him to work in the family business so that he can inherit the hotel from his grandmother, who is the current president of the business, but Chatvin wants to work in human resources or public relations department but his ambitious mother is against it, though she wanted Chatwin to work on their family business or something higher to get credit to his grandma. Lastly, Totsawin the eldest of the three, his father committed suicide and he feels that he is a black sheep of the family, he wants to be a cook and prove himself worthy for the family, he appears to be cold, serious, and a stern man. The leading ladies are Jomjai (Peeranee Kongthai), Kaewsai (Rasri Balenciaga), and Kun (Chalida Vijitvongthong) are three best friends who also are classmates in a local university. Jomjai's specialty is cooking, Kun is decorating and being a florist, while Kaewsai is the dessert cook. For their final semester Jomjai, Kaew, and Kun are sent to Siamtara hotel where they met the three heirs of the hotel.

== Cast ==
- Krissada Pornweroj (Smart) as Totsavin "Tot" Akarisirit
- Peeranee Kongthai (Matt) as Jomjai "Jom" Phonphipat
- Rasri Balenciaga (Margie) as Kaewsai "Kaew" Benjakorn
- Louis Scott as Chatsavin "Chat"
- Chalida Vijitvongthong (Mint) as Kun Phongvalaiporn
- Ekkaphong Jongkesakorn (First) as Atsavin "Win"

Supporting Cast

- Sukontava Kernimit (Mai) as Urairisa "Risa"
- Ron Banjongsang
- Nathalie Davies as Lalin Vongarayan
- Viragarn Seneetunti (Maprang) as Ninrat Methakom
- Supranee Jayrinpon

Guest Cast

- Thong Vattana (Dilok) as Prakorn = Totsawin's father who committed a suicide.

== Awards ==
Television
Year	Award	Category	Actor/Actress	Result
2010	Top Awards	Best Supporting Actor in a Lakorn	Louis Scott	Nominated
2010	Top Awards	Best Rising Actor in a Lakorn	Ekkaphong Jongkesakorn	Nominated
