= Thong Ek: The Herbal Master =

2019 Thai television romantic comedy series

- Genre: Romantic comedy
- Written by: Jinjo
- Directed by: Chudapa Chantakett
- Starring: Mario Maurer; Kimberley Anne Woltemas
- Opening theme: "Ya, Ya, Ya" by Mario Maurer feat. Ayutthaya Cute Boys
- Country of origin: Thailand
- Original language: Thai
- No. of episodes: 14

Production
- Producer: Piya Swetphikul
- Camera setup: Multiple-camera setup
- Running time: 150 minutes
- Production companies: Sonix Boom 2013 Co., Ltd.

Original release
- Network: Channel 3 HD
- Release: 31 January – 20 March 2019

Thong Ek: The Herbal Master (ทองเอก หมอยา ท่าโฉลง, Thong Ek Mor Ya Tha Chalong) is a Thai television romantic comedy series broadcast by Channel 3 HD. Premiered on 31 January 2019, it starred Mario Maurer and Kimberley Anne Woltemas. The show concluded on 20 March 2019, with a total of 14 episodes.

== Premise ==
Set during the reign of King Chulalongkorn (Rama V) in the late 19th century, the series follows Thong Ek, a young man who studies traditional Thai medicine in an effort to restore his family's reputation after his grandfather, a respected physician, is accused of malpractice. As he trains to become a skilled herbal doctor, Thong Ek faces rival practitioners, treats patients using traditional remedies, and develops a romance with Chaba.

== Cast and characters ==
Cast

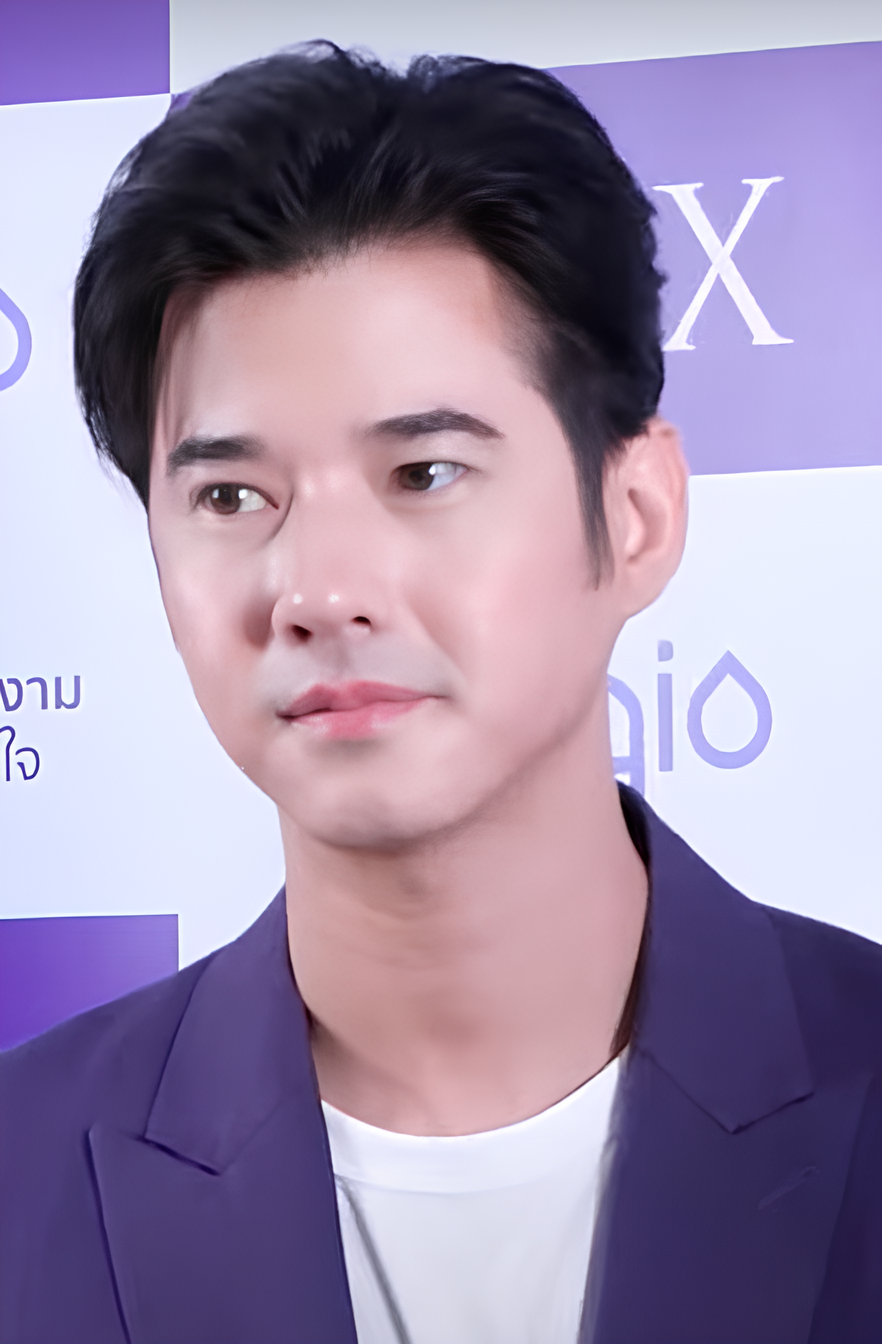
Mario Maurer

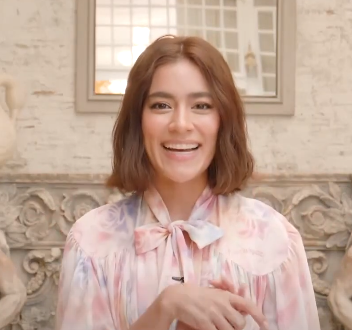
Kimberley Anne Woltemas

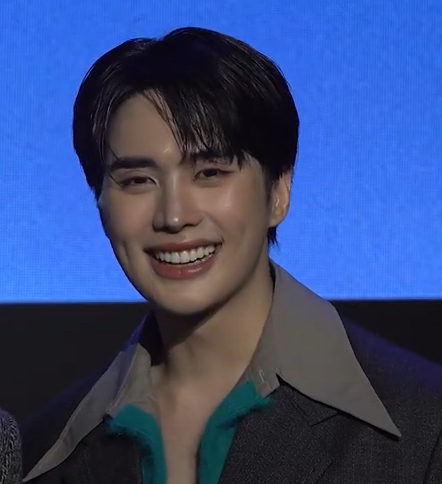
Sarin Ronnakiat

Lead cast

- Mario Maurer as Thong Ek
- Kimberley Anne Woltemas as Chaba

Supporting actors

- Porama Im-anotai as Kla
- Purita Supinchompoo as Phong
- Sarin Ronnakiat as Phoem
- Chayanit Chaicharoen as Kling
- Napapa Tantrakul as Chongko
- Jakkrit Ammarat as Khun Kasikam Bamrung
- Jintara Sukapat as Khun Nai Saiyut
- Ratchada Amratisha as Mae Man
- Rong Kaomulkadee as Pu Thong-in
- Jennifer Kim as Khun Nai Kingkae
- Sriphan Chuenchomboon as Khun Nai Yuean
- Nattapong Chartpong as Piak
- Jupjip Chernyim as Tun
- Phichaphat Mahathitayakul as Phoeng
- Phattharaporn Mukchokwatthana as Rampoei
- Samat Niamsa-at as Jim
- Yothin Mapopphan as Luang Ta Phet
- Charoensuk Naksawat as Nang Im
- Kingkan Traiyasut as Nang Chui

Guest cast

- Thanya Sophon as Her Royal Highness Princess Piangmaen Narumitr
- Natt Thephussadin na Ayutthaya as Prince Pin Preeda
- Noi Chernyim as Uncle Khao
- Komsan Tinnakorn Na Ayutthaya as Royal Physician
- Nichkhun as Gyeong-seok
- Rasri Balenciaga Chirathivat as Mi-rae
- Akkaranan Worarojcharoendech as Daeng Sing

== Production ==
=== Development ===
Director Chudapa Chantakett drew inspiration for the series from Doctor Sommai of Sing Buri province, a modern medical doctor who studied traditional Thai herbal medicine. Seeing the value of Thai traditional wisdom and heritage, Chantakett developed the concept into a television drama.

To ensure accuracy and realism, the production team chose accessible and easy health conditions such as headaches, stomach aches, common colds, and chickenpox, while also featuring complex traditional illnesses such as "Pan Dam" (black birthmark-like skin disease) and "I-Dam". Before filming, lead actor Mario Maurer was trained by traditional herbal doctors to learn techniques, such as reading pulses using three fingers.

=== Filming locations ===
Principal photography took place at several historic sites, including the Jamjuree Traditional Thai House in Phra Nakhon Si Ayutthaya province, Wat Singh, and the Buddhism Promotion Center of Thailand in Pathum Thani province.

== Release ==
=== Broadcast ===
Thong Ek: The Herbal Master originally premiered in Thailand on Channel 3 on 31 January 2019, airing every Wednesday and Thursday in the 20:20 (ICT) timeslot until its conclusion on 20 March 2019.

In the Philippines, the series was dubbed in Tagalog under the title The Herbal Master and made its terrestrial television debut on GMA Network on 18 April 2022. Following its run on the main network, the series made its channel debut on the digital subchannel Heart of Asia on 1 May 2023.

=== Streaming ===
In September 2019, the series was made available for video on demand streaming on Netflix in select regions. It was later made available in Singapore via Mediacorp's video streaming service mewatch in March 2020. It was also added to the iQIYI streaming platform on 3 January 2022.

== Accolades ==
Accolades received by Thong Ek: The Herbal Master
Year	Award	Category	Recipient	Result	Ref.
2020	2020 TV Gold Awards	Best Comedy Performance	Mario Maurer	Won	
2020	2020 TV Gold Awards	Best Actor in a Leading Role	Mario Maurer	Won	
