= Qi Pao (TV series) =

- กี่เพ้า
- Starring: Ann Thongprasom; Smart Krissada Pornweroj; Nirut Sirijanya; Chintara Sukapatana
- Opening theme: Qi Pao by Jennifer Kim
- Ending theme: Sailom Haeng Ruk by Ben Chalatit
- Country of origin: Thailand
- Original language: Thai
- No. of episodes: 13

Production
- Production location: Thailand

Original release
- Network: Channel 3
- Release: 1 November – 13 December 2012

Qi Pao (Thai: กี่เพ้า; RTGS: Ki-phao; Chinese: 旗袍; pinyin: Qípáo) is a Thai lakorn that aired on Channel 3. It features Ann Thongprasom as Paeka (Pink) and Krissada Pornveroj as Zhao Ming Tian.

== Synopsis ==
Paeka (Ann Thongprasom) a tall hardworking woman is working at the Asian Institute of Textile and Apparel in Thailand as a Thai curator. One day she met Zhao Ming Tian (Krissada Pornweroj), also known as Daniel, a handsome Chinese man and the son of Zhao Wen Yue (Nirut Sirijanya) who is the owner of the 30 qipao dresses that were presented for an exhibition. One of the qipao dresses in the exhibition belonged to Zhao Ming Tian's recently deceased wife, of whom Paeka bears an uncanny resemblance. Paeka is invited to Hong Kong by the family to investigate Wang Lee's murder.

== Cast ==
=== Main Role ===
- Ann Thongprasom as Paeka Supatkul (Pink) /May Lee (Sukonta, Mei Li)
- Smart Krissada Pornweroj as Zhao Ming Tian (Chinese: 赵明天; pinyin: Zhào Míngtiān), also known as Daniel, The second young master of Zhao family.

=== Supporting cast ===
- Nirut Sirijanya (Ning) as Zhao Wen Yue (Chinese: 赵文岳; pinyin: Zhào Wényuè), absolutely-power leader of Zhao Family, he also the founding father of Zhao pharmacy industrial.
- Chintara Sukapatana (Mam) as Wang Li Ping (Chinese: 王利平; pinyin: Wáng Lìpíng), The First mistress of Zhao Wen Yue.
- Pitchanart Sakakorn (May) as Zhao Lin Pei (Chinese: 赵琳佩; pinyin: Zhào Línpèi), Zhao Wen Yue's Adopted daughter. She felt in love with Zhao Ming Tian.
- Panadda Wongphudee (Boom) as Lin Mei Ying (Chinese: 林美樱; pinyin: Lín Měiyīng), a former night club beautiful singer who became a second mistress of Zhao Wen Yue.
- Anuchit Sapanpong (Oh) as Liang Wei He (Chinese: 梁伟和; pinyin: Liáng Wěihè), a stealthy intelligent homeless.
- Pijittra Siriwetchapan (Jieb) as Yang Yu Lian (Chinese: 杨玉莲; pinyin: Yáng Yùlián), Wife of Wang Jun Zhen.
- Anuwat Niwatwong (Poo) as Wang Jun Zhen (Chinese: 王俊镇; pinyin: Wáng Jùnzhèn), The younger brother of Wang Li Ping, Wang Yu Lian's husband.
- Deejai Deedeedee (Pad thai) as Xiu Lan (Chinese: 秀兰; pinyin: Xiù Lán), Chief of Zhao family maid and household keeper.
- Pecky Sritanya as Bao Lin (Chinese: 宝琳), Lin Mei Ying and Zhao Lin Pei's close-assistant maid.
- Worawut Niyomsup (Oat) as Zhao Ming Shan (Chinese: 赵明山; pinyin: Zhào Míngshān）
- Suprawat PratamaSutra as A Hua (Chinese: 阿华; pinyin: A Huá), The greatest qipao crafter, Xiu Lan's father.
- Suchao Pongwilai as Li Xian (Chinese: 李娴; pinyin: Lǐ Xián), a former red guards soldier.
- Tassaneewan Seniwong Na Ayuddhaya as Auntie Zhi (Chinese: 芷奶奶; pinyin: Zhǐ nǎinai), Old poor women in fishermen village, Liang Wei He's mother.
- Teerapong Liaorakwong as Tantai, Paeka's uncle who has unordinary vision skill.
- Panleka Wanmuang as Paeka's mother.

=== Cameo (historical figure) ===
- Mao Zedong (Chinese: 毛泽东)
- Aisin-Gioro Puyi (Chinese: 愛新覺羅 溥儀)
- Empress Wanrong (Chinese: 婉容皇后)

== Awards ==
Year	Award/Recognition	Category	Nominee	Result
2012	Colorful Entertainment Awards	Best Actress	Ann Thongprasom	Won
2012	Top Awards	Best Actress in a Lakorn	Ann Thongprasom	Won
2012	MThai Top Talk-About Awards	Top Talk Actress	Ann Thongprasom	Nominated
2012	Great Awards	Best Actress of the Year	Ann Thongprasom	Nominated
2012	4th Annual Royal Dancer Awards	Best Actress	Ann Thongprasom	Nominated
