= Paen Rai Phai Ruk =

- Also known as: Evil Plan Loses for Love
- แผนร้ายพ่ายรัก
- Starring: Peeranee Kongthai; Jirayu Thantrakul
- Country of origin: Thailand
- Original language: Thai
- No. of episodes: 16

Production
- Production location: Thailand
- Running time: Monday - Tuesday
- Production company: Master One Production

Original release
- Network: Channel 3
- Release: March 18 – May 7, 2013

Related
- Mon Jun Tra; Fah Kra Jao Dao

Paen Rai Phai Ruk (Thai: แผนร้ายพ่ายรัก, RTGS: Phaen Rai Phai Rak; literally: Evil Plan Loses for Love) is a 2013 Thai television soap opera) which is aired on Channel 3 and starred Peeranee Kongthai.

== Synopsis ==
Kemmik (Peeranee Kongthai) is a flight attendant who currently works at the airline company owned by Phisaeng's family. After having a one-night stand with Seua who is later revealed to be Phisaeng before the story started, Kemmik had never believed in love since at the time that she had a one-night stand with Seua, she is still a fat young lady of whom she thinks that the guy who never liked and would only like her body, so she decided to be pretty and sexy to get back at those kind of guys.

She later got hired by Phisaeng's mother Saengsuda (Jarunee Suksawat) to destroy the love of Phisaeng whom is thought to be Sawida (Tubtim Pichamon) Phisaeng's secretary at his farm, and bring Phisaeng back to Thailand to manage the airline company instead of the farm that he has been taking care of.

== Cast ==
- Peeranee Kongthai (Matt) as Kemmik "Kem"
- Esther Supreeleela as Naetnipha "Naet" - Kemmik's friend and also an air hostess.
- Jirayu Thantrakul (Got) as Konthee - Phisaeng's friend

Supporting Cast

- Warulak Sirimaneewattana (Gale) as Phisinee - Phisaeng's sister and Phitya's wife.
- Surint Karawoot (Woot) as Phitya - A pilot in Phisinee's family airline company who later becomes Kemmik's boyfriend but later broke up with her, after many years he once again met up with Kemmik in the airline company in which Kemmik also work as a flight attendant, and at that time it is announced that he will marry Phisinee, but also claim that he still love Kemmik and misses her a lot, but Kemmik just brush him off and he still continued to marry Phisinee.
- Santisuk Promsiri (Noom) as Phisut - Phisaeng and Phisinee's father.
- Jarunee Suksawat (Ple) as Saengsuda - Phisut's wife and Phisaeng and Phisinee's mother.
- Alex Thiradaet as Dr. Prin - A veterinarian and friend of Phisaeng.
- Tubtim Pichamon as Sawida - Phisaeng's secretary who likes Phisaeng because of his fortune and will do anything just to make Phisaeng like her.
