= Pathapee Leh Ruk =

Thai television soap opera

- Pathapee Leh Ruk poster
- Also known as: Pathapee's Love Trick
- ปฐพีเล่ห์รัก
- Written by: Prapaisri Srinatom
- Directed by: Somjing Srisuparb
- Starring: Prin Suparat; Chalida Vijitvongthong
- Opening theme: Hai Rak Dern Tang Ma Jer Gan (Let Love Meet) by Chinawut Indracusin
- Ending theme: Yang Noi Gor Ruk Ter Pen Meun Gun by Tina
- Country of origin: Thailand
- Original language: Thai
- No. of episodes: 7

Production
- Producer: Good Feeling
- Production location: Thailand
- Running time: Friday – Sunday

Original release
- Network: Channel 3
- Release: 26 November – 10 December 2010

Related
- Duang Jai Akkanee; Wayupak Montra

Pathapee Leh Ruk (Thai: ปฐพีเล่ห์รัก; RTGS: Pa-tha-phi Le Rak) is a 2010 Thai lakorn 1 in a 4 drama series called 4 Hearts of the Mountains or 4 Huajai Haeng Koon Kao (4 หัวใจแห่งขุนเขา ) that it's aired on Channel 3. It starred Prin Suparat and Chalida Vijitvongthong.

== Synopsis ==
Pathapee "Din" Adisuan (Prin Suparat) is the owner of Thararin Resort and has to confront the troublemaker that goes into his resort and that included Cha-Aim (Chalida Vijitvongthong) daughter of Mok (Jakkrit Ammarat) the owner of Maek Mai Valley and one of the enemy of Thararin Resort who plans to destroy Thararin's reputation in order to be accepted by his father and also the fact that she believes that Pathapee had hurt her parents before so she wanted to destroy Thararin Resort, but as they quarrel and conspire each other's back and in the end they find that they have an ever growing attraction for each other, but which one is more important family, resort or their love?.

== Cast ==
=== Main cast ===
- Prin Suparat (Mark) as Pathapee "Din" Adisuan
- Chalida Vijitvongthong (Mint) as Cher-Aim (Cha-Aim) Vongvanitsakunkit/Cher-Aim (Cha-Aim) Vongvai
- Jessica Pasaphan (Jessie) as RungArun "Oliang" Yenjai
- Jakkrit Ammarat (Kik) as Natee
- Nadech Kugimiya (Barry) as Akkanee "Fai" Adisuan
- Pakorn Chatborirak (Boy) as Wayupak "Lom" Adisuan

=== Supporting cast ===
- Jakkrit Ammarat (Ton) as Mok
- Panchanida Seesaamram (Pang) as Sonchat "Pine"
- Natthaphong Karbthong as Tonsai
- Boromwuti Hiranyathiti (Mick) as Saroj
- Tanongsak Supakarn as Wasan
- Supranee Jayrinpon as Mali
- Yuwadee Praihirun as Khun Bualoy
- Nilubon Amornvitavat as Khun Rarin

=== Special appearances ===
- Kimberly Ann Voltemas (Kim) as Thipthara "Nam Adisuan-Rajaput

== Awards ==
Year	Award/Recognition	Category	Nominee	Result
2011	Top Awards	Best New Coming Actress	Chalida Vijitvongthong	Nominated
2011	Top Awards	Best New Coming Actor	Prin Suparat	Nominated
2011	Top Awards	Best Supporting Actress in a Lakorn	Panchanida Seesaamram	Nominated
