= Nueng Dao Fa Diao =

2018 Thai television series

- หนึ่งด้าวฟ้าเดียว
- Created by: TV Seen
- Based on: Nueng Dao Fa Diao by Wannawat
- Screenplay by: Aek Likhit
- Directed by: Kittisak Cheevasatjasakul
- Starring: Jirayu Tangsrisuk; Natapohn Tameeruks; Atichart Chumnanont; Nattarika Thammapridanant
- Opening theme: "Huachai Diao Kan" - Mac The Darkest Romance
- Ending theme: "Kep" - Jirayu Tangsrisuk "Huachai Chop Kon" - Glom Oreavee
- Country of origin: Thailand
- Original language: Thai
- No. of episodes: 17 episodes

Production
- Producer: Nattanan Chaweewong
- Running time: 150 minutes

Original release
- Network: Ch3 Thailand, LINE TV
- Release: 25 April – 20 June 2018

Nueng Dao Fa Diao (Thai: หนึ่งด้าวฟ้าเดียว) is a 2018 Thai television drama adapted from the novel of the same name authored by Wannawat, who also wrote Kha Bodin, which was adapted into drama in 2015. Portraying the historical events during the war of 1765–67 between Ayutthaya and Konbaung Burma, the drama starred Jirayu Tangsrisuk and Natapohn Tameeruks amongst others and was originally aired on Channel 3 from 25 April to 20 June 2018.

== Cast ==
=== Khan Thong and friends ===
- Jirayu Tangsrisuk as Khan Thong ("Golden Bowl"), later Ok-luang Si Khanthin, Ok-phra Si Khanthin (Khan Thong), and Phra Si Satcha, respectively, disguised as a eunuch and entered the royal court of Ayutthaya for a secret mission
- Thakrit Tawanpong as Naen, later Khun Chit Chai Phak, friend of Khan Thong, later executed in lieu of Khan Thong

=== Maeng Mao and family ===
- Natapohn Tameeruks as Maeng Mao ("Alate"), citizen of Ayutthaya, named after Princess Maeng Mao
- Montri Jenaksorn as Squire Ming, father of Maeng Mao
- Danai Charuchinda as Muang, elder brother of Maeng Mao
- Morrakot Hathaiwasiwong as In, wife of Muang
- Petchlada Tiampetch as Chuen, younger sister of Muang

=== Royal harem of Ayutthaya ===
- Chintara Sukapatana as Princess Maeng Mao, later Krommakhun Wimon Phakdi, queen consort of King Suriyat Amarin
- Nattarika Thammapridanant as Phen, concubine of King Suriyat Amarin
- Khwanruedi Glomglorm as Amphan, concubine of King Suriyat Amarin
- Amonlada Chaidech as Pao, servant of Princess Maeng Mao
- Prattana Banchongsang as Khunthao So-pha, governess
- Tarinda Kannasoot as Khunthao Salika, governess, mother of Khan Thong

=== Nobility of Ayutthaya ===
- Atichart Chumnanont as Phraya Tak, governor of Tak, later King Taksin of Thon Buri
- Jirayu Tantrakul as Luang Phichai Asa, confident of Phraya Tak
- Vatcharachai Sunthornsiri as Phan Han, soldier under Phraya Tak
- Suriyont Arunwattanakul as Phraya Kamhaeng, later Ok-ya Wang
- Jakkrit Ammarat as Phraya Phonlathep, acting as a spy for Burma
- Gosin Rachakrom as Phoem, later Cha-muen Si Sorarak, younger brother of Concubine Phen
- Nirud Saosudchard as Khun Phlaeng Rit
- Suchao Pongwilai as Ok-phra Racha Khan, chief eunuch
- Passakorn Boonvorramatee as Ok-luang Si Mano Rat
- Nipat Charoenphol as Khun Rak Thewa
- Thanaphon Pheechaphat as Khun Thep Chamnan
- Nattapon Wirayachai as Khun Thep Raksa
- Adisorn Athakrit as Phraya Chanthabun, governor of Chanthabun
- Veyn Folconer as Phraya Siharat Decha
- Rachawat Klipngern as Phraya Phetchaburi, governor of Phetchaburi
- Seksun Suttijun as Khun Phadet

=== Burma ===
- Amorathep Rimdusit as King Alaungpaya
- Ekkaphong Jongkesakorn as King Hsinbyushin, son of Alaungpaya
- Chatchawan Phetwisith as Maha Nawrahta
- Visarut Hirunbutsya as Ne Myo Thihapate
- Santi Santivetchakul as Maha Thiha Thura
- Paithon Songubol as Thong Suk, also known as Suki Phra Nai Kong

=== Others ===
- Witawat Singlampong as Prince Chet of Ayutthaya
- Vorarit Fuangarome as Kla
- Khakkingrak Khikkhiksaranang as Luean
- Atthama Chiwanitchaphan as Yuean
- Chulalak Ismalone as Yisun
- Attapol Testtawong as Phon
- Anuwat Moonkom as Tin
- Somchai Kemglad as Suea Khunthong, chief bandit
- Yotin Maphobpan as Monk, master of Khan Thong

== Reception ==
Episode	aired on date	international rating (AGB Nielsen)	bangkok rating (Ch3 Thailand)	countryin the municipality	countryout the municipality
1	25 April 2561	4.8	7.2	5.9	3.8
2	26 April 2561	3.9	6.5	5.7	2.7
3	2 May 2561	4.0	5.9	5.2	3.2
4	3 May 2561	4.3	6.4	5.4	3.5
5	9 May 2561	3.6	5.5	4.3	2.9
6	10 May 2561	3.8	6.5	5.0	2.8
7	16 May 2561	4.1	5.7	5.3	3.3
8	17 May 2561	3.5	5.9	5.0	2.4
9	23 May 2561	3.0	4.8	4.2	2.2
10	24 May 2561	3.8	5.9	5.4	2.8
11	30 May 2561	3.5	5.4	5.5	2.4
12	31 May 2561	3.6	5.1	5.1	2.7
13	6 June 2561	4.1	6.6	5.7	3.0
14	7 June 2561	4.4	6.8	6.5	3.1
15	13 June 2561	4.9	6.8	6.2	4.0
16	14 June 2561	4.7	6.0	6.4	3.7
17	20 June 2561	4.2	6.2	5.7	3.1
