= Ruk Pathiharn =

- Also known as: Miracle of Love
- รักปาฏิหาริย์
- Starring: Krissada Pornweroj; Kimberly Ann Voltemas; Chalida Vijitvongthong; Alex Rendell
- Country of origin: Thailand
- Original language: Thai
- No. of episodes: 21

Production
- Producer: Maker Group
- Production location: Thailand
- Running time: Monday - Tuesday

Original release
- Network: Channel 3
- Release: 25 October 2011 – 6 January 2012

Related
- Patiharn Ruk

Ruk Pathiharn (Thai: รักปาฏิหาริย์; RTGS: Rak Patihan) is a 2011 romance, comedy, and drama lakorn aired on Channel 3 starring Krissada Pornweroj, Kimberly Ann Voltemas, Chalida Vijitvongthong, and Alex Rendell.

== Synopsis ==
Nichamon Chutima (Kimberly Ann Voltemas) lost her parents and returns to Thailand to find grandparents to apologize in turn for her mother. She later find out that her grandfather had died three years ago, and so she decided to takes up her housekeeper identity Pranom Sponserb to find a way to find her grandmother.

Now a housekeeper in the Nareusorn Farm, here she discovers the feud between the two neighboring farms rooted in Chaiburathut (Krissada Pornweroj) because Thut saw a signed document between his father and the neighboring Sonalai farm owner, here he believes that the Sonalais are responsible for swindling money from his dad and this driving his father to his death.

Pimnareumon (Chalida Vijitvongthong) and Rawipaat (Alex Rendell) who is both from the opposite farms have like each other but is guarding their hearts because of the problems between their family.

== Cast ==
- Krissada Pornweroj (Smart) as Chaiburathut "Thut"
- Kimberly Ann Voltemas as Nichamon "Amon" Chutima/Pranom Sponserb
- Chalida Vijitvongthong (Mint) as Pimnareumon "Mon"
- Alex Rendell as Rawipaat - Thut's younger brother and Pimnaremon's childhood friend.

Supporting Cast

- Janesuda Parnto (Jane)
