= Sueangsuda Lawanprasert =

Thai actress, beauty queen, and Miss Thailand 1997 winner (born 1977)

- สรวงสุดา ลาวัณย์ประเสริฐ
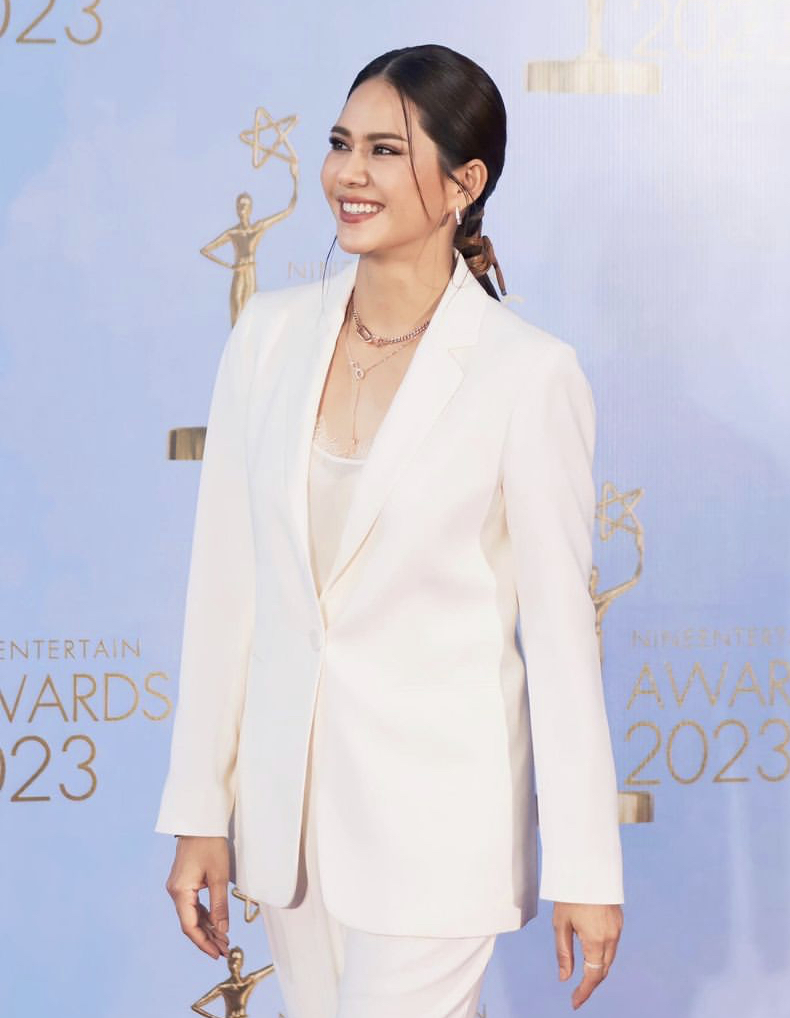
- Born: 30 July 1977 (age 49)
- Other name: Namfon
- Occupation: Actress
- Beauty pageant titleholder
- Title: Miss Thailand 1997
- Major competitions: Miss Thailand 1997 (winner); Miss Universe 1997 (delegates)

Sueangsuda Lawanprasert (Thai: สรวงสุดา ลาวัณย์ประเสริฐ) nicknamed Namfon is a Thai actress and beauty pageant titleholder who won Miss Thailand 1997 and later represented her country Miss Universe 1997.

== As actress ==
Year	Title	Role
2002	Khang paed (Butterfly in Grey)	Dao
2005	Seua khaap daap (The Tiger Blade)	G.I. Jenjila
2012	Rang Ngao, 2012	Ken P's mom

== Television dramas ==
- 2004 Mon Ruk A Soon (2004) (มนต์รักอสูร) (/Ch.3) as Tounjai (เตือนใจ)
- 2005 (ขบวนการปุกปุย) (/Ch.7) as Parichat (ปาริชาติ)
- 2006 Bua Prim Nam (บัวปริ่มน้ำ) (/Ch.3) as Narinee (นลินี)
- 2007 Gong Jak Lai Dok Bua (กงจักรลายดอกบัว) (/Ch.3) as Duang Jai (Guest Role) (ดวงใจ (รับเชิญ))
- 2008 (พริกไทยกับใบข้าว) (/Ch.3) as Panita (ปณิตา)
- 2008 Sawan Biang (สวรรค์เบี่ยง) (/Ch.3) as Saowapha (Guest Role) (เสาวภา (รับเชิญ))
- 2008 Lon Roy Tee Leh Jai (ลบรอยที่เลอะใจ) (/Ch.3) as Malai (มาลัย)
- 2008 (รายากูนิง) (/Thai PBS) as Raya-Aoo-Ngoo (รายาอูงู)
- 2008 Nimit Marn (นิมิตรมาร) (/Ch.3) as Natrudee Chaiwanthana (นาถฤดี ชัยวรรธนา)
- 2008 (สุดแต่ใจจะไขว่คว้า) (/Ch.3) as Kaew (น้าแก้ว)
- 2008 Thang Charng Puark (ทางช้างเผือก) (/Ch.3) as Wiphada (Guest Role) (วิภาดา (รับเชิญ))
- 2009 Lah Pee Porb (ล่าผีปอบ) (/Ch.3) as Benjamat (เบญจมาศ)
- 2009 (แก้วจอมแก่น) (/Ch.9) as Koi (ก้อย)
- 2009 Prasart Meud (ปราสาทมืด) (/Ch.3) as Orn (หม่อมอร)
- 2010 (แก้วกลางดอย) (/Ch.5) as Suda (สุดา)
- 2010 Peesard Saen Kol (ปีศาจแสนกล) (/Ch.3) as Amara (คุณหญิงอมรา)
- 2010 Neur Mek (เหนือเมฆ) (/Ch.3) as Orn-In (อรอินทร์)
- 2010 (หวานใจกับนายจอมหยิ่ง) (/Ch.3) as Pen (Guest Role) (เพ็ญ (รับเชิญ))
- 2010 Kularb Son Narm (กุหลาบซ่อนหนาม) (/Ch.3) as Yada (ญาดา)
- 2010 Sira Patchara Duang Jai Nak Rope (ศิราพัชร ดวงใจนักรบ) (/Ch.3) as ()
- 2010 Phraathit Kheun Ram (พระอาทิตย์คืนแรม) (/Thai PBS) as Penprapha (เพ็ญประภา)
- 2010 (พระมารดา 3) (/Ch.5) as (พระวิสุทธิกษัตริย์)
- 2011 Rahut Torachon (รหัสทรชน) (/Ch.3) as ()
- 2011 Kularb Rai Glai Ruk (กุหลาบร้ายกลายรัก) (/Ch.3) as ()
- 2011 Ngao Pray (เงาพราย) (/Ch.3) as ()
- 2011 Plerng Torranong (เพลิงทระนง) (/Ch.3) as ()
- 2011 Kol Ruk Luang Jai (กลรักลวงใจ) (/Ch.3) as ()
- 2011 Ruk Pathiharn (รักปาฏิหาริย์) (/Ch.3) as ()
- 2012 Ruk Khun Tao Fah (รักคุณเท่าฟ้า) (/Ch.3) as ()
- 2012 Hong Sabud Lai (สะใภ้ซ่าส์ แม่ย่าเฮี้ยน) (/Ch.3) as ()
- 2012 Sapai Zah Mae Yah Hien (สะใภ้ซ่าส์ แม่ย่าเฮี้ยน) (/Ch.3) as ()
- 2012 (อำแดงเหมือนกับนายริด) (/Thai PBS) as ()
- 2012 Raeng Ngao (2012) (แรงเงา) (/Ch.3) as ()
- 2012 Tawan Chai Nai Marn Mek (ตะวันฉายในม่านเมฆ) (/Ch.3) as ()
- 2013 Pan Rai Phai Ruk (แผนร้ายพ่ายรัก) (/Ch.3) as ()
- 2013 Tawan Baan Toong (ตะวันบ้านทุ่ง) (/Ch.3) as ()
- 2013 Samee (สามี) (/Ch.3) as ()
- 2014 Wiang Roy Dao (เวียงร้อยดาว) (/Ch.3) as ()
- 2014 Look Mai Korng Por Series: Nai Marn Mek (ในม่านเมฆ) (/Ch.3) as ()
- 2014 Fai Ruk Plerng Kaen (ไฟรักเพลิงแค้น) (/Ch.3) as ()
- 2014 Kularb Son Klin (กุหลาบซ่อนกลิ่น) (/Ch.3) as ()
- 2014 Ruk Ok Rit (รักออกฤทธิ์) (/Ch.3) as ()
- 2014 Look Sao Phor Mod (ลูกสาวพ่อมด) (/Ch.3) as ()
- 2014 Sai See Plerng 2014 (ทรายสีเพลิง) (/Ch.3) as ()
- 2014 Rai Rak Payak Kung Fu (ร้ายรักพยัคฆ์กังฟู) (/Ch.3) as ()
- 2015 Nang Sao Thong Soi (นางสาวทองสร้อย คุณแจ๋วหมายเลข 1) (/Ch.3) as ()
- 2015 Kor Pen Jaosao Suk Krung Hai Cheun Jai (ขอเป็นเจ้าสาวสักครั้งให้ชื่นใจ) (/Ch.3) as ()
- 2015 Poo Ying Khon Nun Chue Boonrawd (ผู้หญิงคนนั้นชื่อบุญรอด) (/One 31) as ()
- 2016 Gum Lai Mat (กำไลมาศ) (/Ch.3) as ()
- 2016 Chaat Payak (ชาติพยัคฆ์) (/Ch.3) as ()
- 2016 Nang Eye (Ch.3) as Saisanom
- 2016 Jao Jom (เจ้าจอม) (/Ch.3 SD) as ()
- 2016 Kularb Tud Petch (กุหลาบตัดเพชร) (/Ch.3) as (Guest Role)
- 2017 Ching Ruk Rissaya (ชิงรัก ริษยา) (The ONE Enterprise/One 31) as Isaree (อิสรีย์ พชรโชตินันท์)
- 2017 Rachinee Morlum 2017 (ราชินีหมอลำ) (The ONE Enterprise/One 31) as (อิสรีย์ พชรโชตินันท์)
- 2017 Barb Rak Talay Fun 2017 (บาปรักทะเลฝัน) (/Ch.3 SD) as Jattra (Guest Role) (จิตรา (รับเชิญ))
- 2017 Paen Rai Long Tai Warak (แผนร้ายลงท้ายว่ารัก) (/Ch.3) as Ladda (Guest Role) (ลัดดา (รับเชิญ))
- 2017 Rak Nakara 2017 (รากนครา) (Act Art Generation/Ch.3) as Jao Nang Khay Kam (เจ้านางข่ายคำ)
- 2017 Sai Tarn Hua Jai 2017 (สายธารหัวใจ) (/Ch.3) as Prakong (ประคอง)
- 2017 Ra Raerng Fai 2017 (ระเริงไฟ) (/Ch.3) as Kamolpan (กมลพรรณ)
- 2018 Sanae Rak Nang Sin (เสน่ห์รักนางซิน) (/Ch.3) as Pachara (พัชรา)
- 2018 Duang Jai Nai Fai Nhao (ดวงใจในไฟหนาว) (/Ch.3) as Preimjat (เปรมจิต ศิลาทอง)
- 2018 Wiman Cho Ngoen (วิมานจอเงิน) (The ONE Enterprise/One 31) as ()
- 2018 Pbee Kaew Nang Hong 2018 (ปี่แก้วนางหงส์) (/Ch.3) as Pian (เพียร)
- 2018 Barb Ruk 2018 (บาปรัก) (The ONE Enterprise/One 31) as (Guest Role)
- 2019 Sao Noi Roy Lan View (สาวน้อยร้อยล้านวิว) (The ONE Enterprise/One 31) as Marin (มาลิน)
- 2019 Rak Nee Hua Jai Rao Jong (2019) (รักนี้หัวใจเราจอง) (CHANGE2561/GMM 25) as Rarinthip (ระรินทิพย์)
- 2019 Wai Saeb Saraek Kard 2 (วัยแสบสาแหรกขาด โครงการ 2) (/Ch.3) as Kawita (กวิตา เฉลิมชัยโกศล)
- 2019 Raeng Ngao Raeng Kaen (แรงเงา 2 แรงเงาแรงแค้น) (/Ch.3) as Soi Kam (สร้อยคำ อภิบาลบดินทร์)
- 2019 My Love From Another Star (ลิขิตรักข้ามดวงดาว) (/Ch.3) as Pen (เพ็ญ)
- 2019 Nee Sanaeha (หนี้เสน่หา) (The ONE Enterprise/One 31) as Arunee (อรุณี)
- 2020 Duang Baeb Nee Mai Mee Ju (ดวงแบบนี้ไม่มีจู๋) (/Ch.3) as Khing (กิ่ง)
- 2020 Kwam Song Jum See Jang (ความทรงจำสีจาง) (/Ch.3) as Budsaba (บุษบา)
- 2020 Roy Leh Marnya (ร้อยเล่ห์มารยา) (/Ch.3) as Sunee (สุนีย์)
- 2021 Kaew Lerm Korn (2021) (แก้วลืมคอน) (The ONE Enterprise/One 31) as jao Noi (เจ้าน้อย)
- 2021 Duang Jai Nai Montra (ดวงใจในมนตรา) (/Ch.3) as (พระนางสุชาวดีเทวี (รับเชิญ))
- 2021 To Me, It's Simply you (มนต์รักหนองผักกะแยง) (/Ch.3) as Pilai (พิไล นามดี / พิไล พันธุ์วิเศษ)
- 2022 Sroi Sabunnga (สร้อยสะบันงา) (/Ch.3) as Pikul (หม่อมพิกุล)
- 2022 Petchakard Jun Jao (เพชฌฆาตจันทร์เจ้า) (/Ch.3) as Thidarat (ธิดารัตน์)
- 2022 Pom Sanaeha (ปมเสน่หา) (/Ch.3) as Phaka (ผกา)
- 2022 Lay Luntaya (เล่ห์ลุนตยา) (/Ch.8) as Alawadee (เอละวดี)
- 2023 Tee Sud Khong Huajai (ที่สุดของหัวใจ) (Hokseeeiaw/Ch.3) as Phattra (Cameos) (พัตตรา (รับเชิญ))
- 2023 18 Mongkut Sadud Love (18 มงกุฎสะดุดเลิฟ) (Montage Entertainment/Ch.3) as Pum (ปุ้ม)
- 2023 Mor Luang (Royal Doctor) (หมอหลวง) (Sonix Boom 2013/Ch.3) as Toun (หม่อมต่วน)
- 2023 Ruen Chadanang (เรือนชฎานาง) (/Ch.8) as Kana (คณา)
- 2023 (มาตาลดา) (/Ch.3) as ()
- 2023 (กรงดอกสร้อย) (/Ch.3) as Jao song La (เจ้าส่องหล้า)
- 2023 (รักท่วมทุ่ง) (/Ch.3) as ()
- 2024 Blondie in an Ancient Time as Fueang | Network: Workpoint TV

== Television series ==
- 2013 Khun Chai Puttipat (คุณชายพุฒิภัทร) (/Ch.3) as ()
- 2013 (เซน...สื่อรักสื่อวิญญาณ ตอน วิกฤตการเงิน) (/Ch.5) as (Guest Role)
- 2015 Luerd Mungkorn: Krating (เลือดมังกร ตอน กระทิง) (/Ch.3) as (Guest Role)
- 2016 (ปาฏิหาริย์ เดอะซีรีส์ ตอน รักไม่พร้อม) (/PPTVHD 36) as (Guest Role)
- 2017 Kamathep Online (กามเทพออนไลน์) (/Ch.3) as (Guest Role)
- 2017 Club Friday Celeb's Stories (Club Friday Celeb's Stories ตอน แย่งชิง) (/GMM 25) as ()
- 2018 Happy Birthday (Happy Birthday วันเกิดของนาย วันตายของฉัน) (GMMTV/GMM 25) as ()
- 2019 The Man Series (ลูกผู้ชาย: ภูผา) (/Ch.3) as ()
- 2021 Mr. Lipstick (แต้มรัก) (The ONE Enterprise-GMMTV/GMM 25) as ()
- 2021 Don't Say No (เมื่อหัวใจใกล้กัน) (/LINE TV) as (Guest Role)
- 2021 Put Your Head on My Shoulder (อุ่นไอในใจเธอ) (/) as ()
- 2021 The Player (รัก เป็น เล่น ตาย) (The ONE Enterprise-GMMTV/GMM 25) as ()
- 2022 P.S. I Hate You (ด้วยรักและหักหลัง) (The ONE Enterprise-GMMTV/GMM 25) as ()
- 2022 10 Years Ticket (หนังรักเรื่องที่แล้ว) (The ONE Enterprise-GMMTV/GMM 25) as ()
- 2025 The Next Prince (ข้ามฟ้าเคียงเธอ) (One 31/iQIYI) as Chita

== Television sitcoms ==
- 2012 (บ้านนี้มีรัก) (/Ch.9) as Pub ()
- 2012-2013 (ลูกไม้หลายๆต้น) (/Thai PBS) as Doungta ()
- 2013 (วงษ์คำเหลา เดอะซีรีส์) (/Ch.9) as Rungridee ()
- 2014 (Cup Cake รักล้นครีม) (/Ch.9) as Rampey ()
- 2014 (ระเบิดเถิดเทิงสิงโตทอง) (/Workpoint TV) as Hongfah ()

== Film ==
- 20 (ล) () as

== Music videos ==
- 1998 - (มันไม่เกี่ยว - Hirockshima) (/)
- 2000 - (ส่งฮักส่งแฮง - ศิริพร อำไพพงษ์) (/)
