= Peranee Kongthai =

Thai actress and model (born 1989)

- ภีรนีย์ คงไทย
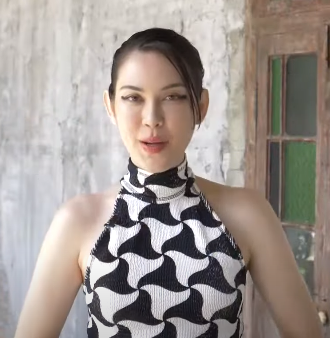
- Born: Peranee Kongthai; July 28, 1989 (age 37); Bangkok, Thailand
- Other name: Peranee Wongdara
- Occupations: Actress; model
- Years active: 2006–present
- Agent: Channel 3 (2006–present)

Peranee Kongthai (Thai: ภีรนีย์ คงไทย, RTGS: Phirani Khongthai; born 28 July 1989), nicknamed Matt (Thai: แมท), is a Thai actress and model.

== Filmography ==
=== Film ===
Year	Title	Role	Notes	With
2011	Soot Ruk Sab E Lee	N/A	Lead Role	Warintorn Panhakarn

=== Television ===
Year	Thai Title	Title	Role	Network	Notes	With
2006	เรือนนารีสีชมพู	Ruen Naree See Chompoo	Chomjai	Channel 3	Main Cast	Surint Karawoot
2007	มณีดิน	Manee Din	Prarng	Channel 3	Lead Role	Saharat Sangkapricha
2008	ชมพู่แก้มแหม่ม	Champoo Garm Marm	Chompoo	Channel 3	Lead Role	Voravit Fuangarome
2009	ก๊วนกามเทพ	Kuan Kamathep	Gaysara	Channel 3	Lead Role	Nattapol Leeyawanich
2010	หวานใจนายจอมหยิ่ง	Wan Jai Gub Nai Jom Ying	Jomjai "Jom" Phonpipat	Channel 3	Lead Role	Krissada Pornweroj
2011	กุหลาบร้ายกลายรัก	Kularb Rai Glai Ruk	Naetchanok "Naet"	Channel 3	Lead Role	Warintorn Panhakarn
2011	ละครลิขิตเสน่หา	Likit Sanae Ha	Yayee	Channel 3	Main Cast	Warintorn Panhakarn
2012	แหม่มแก้มแดง	Mam Gaem Daeng	Anamika	Channel 3	Lead Role	Chakrit Yamnam
2013	แผนร้ายพ่ายรัก	Paen Rai Phai Ruk	Kemmik	Channel 3	Lead Role	
2013	มายาตวัน	Maya Tawan	Mee	Channel 3	Main Cast	None
2013	มนต์จันทรา	Mon Jun Tra	Mee	Channel 3	Main Cast	None
ฟ้ากระจ่างดาว	Fah Krajang Dao	Lead Role	Mee	Channel 3	Pakorn Chatborirak	
2014	ไฟในวายุ	Lead Role	Fai Nai Wayu	Channel 3	Lukwa "Khun Wha"	Atichart Chumnanon
2014	รักนี้เจ้จัดให้	Lead Role	Ruk Nee Jhe Jud Hai	Channel 3	Lookjun "Jun"	Patchata Nampan
2014	รักต้องอุ้ม	Lead Role	Ruk Tong Om	Channel 3	Lanta "Lan"	Warintorn Panhakarn
2015	ข้าบดินทร์	Lead Role	Ka Badin	Channel 3	Lamduan	James Ma
2015	ขอเป็นเจ้าสาวสักครั้งให้ชื่นใจ	Lead Role	Kor Pen Jaosao Suk Krung Hai Cheun Jai	Channel 3	Wiwa	Warintorn Panhakarn
2015	ไฟล้างไฟ	Lead Role	Fai Lang Fai	Channel 3	Leela	Pakorn Chatborirak
2017	เหมือนคนละฟากฟ้า	Lead Role	Muen Kon La Faak Fah	Channel 3	Yothaka	Andrew Gregson
2019	บ่วงนฤมิต	Lead Role	Buang Naruemit	Channel 3	Kwanuma / Chomchalao / Chatchanok	Patchata Nampan
2019	ลิขิตรักข้ามดวงดาว	Lead Role	Likit Ruk Karm Duang Dao	Channel 3	Falada	Nadech Kugimiya
2024	หวานรักต้องห้าม	Lead Role	The Sweetest Taboo	Channel 3	Lin	Panitan Budkaew

== Commercials ==
- CM Cute Press
- CM BSC Cosmetology
- CM Eucerin White
- CM Lux
- CM Sony
- CM Vaseline
- CM Essence
- CM Olay
- CM Bear Brand Milk
- CM Clear Shampoo

== Awards ==
Year	Award	Category	Nominated work	Result
2015	Entertainment Awards	Most Popular Actress in a Lakorn	Ka Badin	Won
2015	Entertainment Awards	Best Actress in a Lakorn	Ka Badin	Won
2016	Kazz Awards	Rising Actress of the Year	N/A	Won
2016	Ganesha Awards	Outstanding Actress in a Lakorn	Fai Lang Fai	Won
2016	Siam Dara Awards	Best Actress in a Lakorn	Fai Lang Fai	Won
