= Maya Tawan =

Thai television soap opera

- Also known as: Tawan's Deception
- มายาตวัน
- Starring: Atichart Chumnanon; Urassaya Sperbund
- Country of origin: Thailand
- Original language: Thai
- No. of episodes: 13

Production
- Producer: TV Scene
- Production location: Thailand
- Running time: Wednesday-Thursday

Original release
- Network: Channel 3
- Release: 3 April – 15 May 2013

Maya Tawan (Thai: มายาตวัน is a 2013 Thai lakorn, starring Atichart Chumnanon and Urassaya Sperbund. It is airing on Channel 3.

== Cast ==
- Atichart Chumnanon (Aum) as Kaede Tawan - A famous movie star
- Urassaya Sperbund (Yaya) as Mattana "Mat" - A die hard fan of Kaede, because of the scandal that Kaede had been through and she decided to be a reporter and when she graduated she worked at Siam Saan together with Waree and Mee who became her first friends there.
- Rasri Balenciaga (Margie) as Waree - A reporter at Siam Saan and the current partner and friend of Mee, but later also Mat. Among the three of them she is the most troublesome one and described as strong, pretty, and sassy.
- Peeranee Kongthai (Matt) as Mee - A reporter at Siam Saan just like Mat and Waree, she is shown to be the complete opposite of Waree since she is well mannered, quiet, and very polite.
- Pakorn Chatborirak (Boy) as Police Inspector Hirun
- Sornram Teppitak (Num) as Chatt
- Apissada Kreurkongka (Ice)
