= Likit Gammatep =

- Also known as: The Fate Cupid
- ลิขิตกามเทพ
- Starring: Ann Thongprasom; Krissada Pornweroj; Apinun Prasertwattanakul; Sakaojai Poolsawad
- Opening theme: Ruk Mai Dai Klied Mai Long by Ae Sasikarn Aphichartworasilp
- Ending theme: "Korn Hin Klin Dok Mai" by James Ruangsak Loychusak
- Country of origin: Thailand
- Original language: Thai
- No. of episodes: 18

Production
- Production location: Thailand
- Running time: Wednesday

Original release
- Network: Channel 3
- Release: 2007

Likit Gammatep (Thai: ลิขิตกามเทพ; RTGS: Li-khit Kammathep) is a 2007 Thai drama/comedy/romance TV series. It stars Ann Thongprasom and Krissada Pornweroj in Channel 3.

== Cast ==
- Ann Thongprasom as Karnploo "Karn"
- Krissada Pornweroj (Smart) as Pinitnai "Nit"
- Apinun Prasertwattanakul (M) as Prada = Karnploo's ex-boyfriend who cheated on her.
- Sakaojai Poolsawad (Aom) as Praelee = Nit's ex-girlfriend who later becomes Prada's wife, but still tries to get Nit back to her.

Supporting Cast

- Karnjana Jindawat as Jinda = Caretaker in Pinitnai's father household.
- Duangta Toongkamanee as Karnploo's Aunt = Karnploo's evil aunt and the one who sold Karnploo to Pinitnai's father for 10 million baht and a box of jewelries.
- Andrew Cronin as Piboon "Boon" = Karnploo's aunt's son and Karnploo's step brother.
- Chotiros Kaewpinit (Sobee) as Passorn = Karnploo's friend and Piboon's love interest.
- Suthee Siangwaan (Am) as Pusit = Pinitnai's friend and a playboy, he usually seen around many girls but has been seriously in love with Karnploo's step sister.
- Montri Janeaksorn (Pu) as Pinitnai's Father = A playboy despite his age, he is usually seen with many girls, but is truly love only 2 woman Pinitnai's late mother and Karnploo. He later died in the story after having a heart attack while he was making out with one of his woman.
- Tatsanawalai Ongajitthichai as Phantipa
- Pattra Apirathkul
- Hana Tudsanawalai
- Daraneenuch Pohpiti (Top) as Pinitnai's aunt
- Orasa Prompatan
- Suchao Pongwilai as Praelee's father
