= Kimberley Anne Woltemas =

Thai actress and model (born 1992)

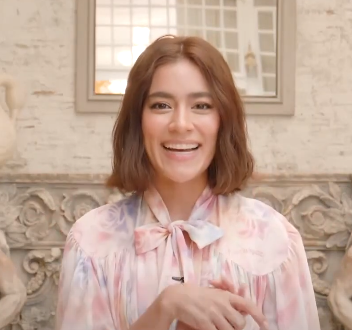
- Kimberley in 2023
- Born: Kimberley Anne Woltemas; January 22, 1992 (age 34); Solingen, North Rhine-Westphalia, Germany
- Other names: Kim; Kimmy
- Citizenship: Germany; Thailand
- Education: Siam University
- Occupations: Actress; model
- Years active: 2010–present
- Agent: Channel 3
- Spouse: Prin Suparat (m. 2023)

Kimberley Anne Woltemas (Thai: คิมเบอร์ลี แอน โวลเทมัส เทียมศิริ; born January 22, 1992) is a Thai-German actress and model. She made her breakthrough in acting career after she played the role of Nam in the series 4 Huajai Haeng Koon Kao (4 Hearts of the Mountains) for the first part of the series, Thara Himalaya, where she was paired up with Atichart Chumnanon.

== Early life and education ==
Woltemas was born on January 22, 1992. She is the daughter of Dr. Hans Joachim Friedrich Woltemas. Her father is half German-Spanish and was born in Germany, before travelling to the United States to study for a bachelor's degree. He holds a doctorate degree in Law from Harvard University, and works as a lawyer. Her mother is Thai, named Linda Tiamsiri. Both of them found love and married in the United States. Kimberley is the fourth child of the family, with 2 brothers named Thomas and Daniel and one sister, named Jennifer. Both her brothers were born in the United States whereas Kimberley and her sister were born in Germany. As a child, she grew up in Germany until she was 7 years old before moving to Thailand with her family in the year 1999.

Woltemas attended Kindergarten in Germany and, upon moving to Thailand, she completed her secondary schooling homeschool and entered further education. She studied at the bachelor's level at Siam University in the field of performing arts (SCA College of Music and Performing Arts) and graduated in 2018.

== Personal life ==
=== Marriage ===
On April 17, 2022, Woltemas and her boyfriend of nine years, Prin Suparat, got engaged in Switzerland. The couple tied the knot on September 14, 2023 at Villa Bonomi, Lake Como, Italy.

== Career ==
Woltemas was approached for modeling in 2009 and she made her debut as an extra actress on Yok Lai Mek as a model. Since then, she has been affiliated with Channel 3, her agency. She appeared in many commercials before debuting in Thara Himalai as a part of "4 Hujai Khon Kao Series" as one of the main newcomers. She achieved success for her character as a doctor and became one of the promised actresses to lead Channel 3 in the future. She is a Thai ambassador of many luxury brands such as Dior, Cartier, Hourglass, etc. She also founded a business called Kimberlite, which is a protein-drink brand.

== Filmography ==
=== Drama ===
Year	Thai Title	English Title	Role	Notes	With
2010	ธาราหิมาลัย	Thara Himalaya	Tipthara "Nam" Adisuan	Lead Role	Atichart Chumnanon
2010	ดวงใจอัคนี	Duang Jai Akkanee	Tipthara "Nam" Adisuan	Guest	Atichart Chumnanon
2010	ปฐพีเล่ห์รัก	Pathapee Leh Ruk	Tipthara "Nam" Adisuan	Guest	Atichart Chumnanon
2010	วายุภัคมนตรา	Wayupak Montra	Tipthara "Nam" Adisuan	Guest	Atichart Chumnanon
2011	รักปาฏิหาริย์	Ruk Pathiharn	Nichamon "Amon" Chutima/Pranom Sponserb	Lead Role	Krissada Pornweroj
2011	สามหนุ่มเนื้อทอง	Sarm Noom Nuer Tong	Arunsiri "Aew"	Lead Role	Prin Suparat
2012	ปัญญาชนก้นครัว	Punya Chon Kon Krua	Amika / Cha-Aim	Lead Role	Prin Suparat
2013	แรงปรารถนา	Rang PratThana	Suarpa/Kratae	Lead Role	Nadech Kugimiya
2013	ต้นรักริมรั้ว	Ton Rak Rim Rua	Narin "Bua"	Lead Role	Prin Suparat
2015	แอบรักออนไลน์	Ab Ruk Online	Pribprao Mahakitpaisan	Lead Role	Prin Suparat
2015	เสือ	Mafia Luerd Mungkorn: Suer	Wanwisa Jitworabanchong	Lead Role	Ananda Everingham
2015	นางร้ายที่รัก	Nang Rai Tee Ruk	Pimchanok Sabpaisananan "Pim"	Lead Role	Pakorn Chatborirak
2016	เพียงชายคนนี้	Piang Chai Kon Nee Mai Chai Poo Wiset	Anusaniya Voralertluk	Lead Role	James Ma
2017	บ่วงหงส์	Buang Hong	Pimlapas "Pim"	Lead Role	Jirayu Tangsrisuk
2018	คมแฝก	Kom Faek	Anchan Ratchasri	Lead Role	Prin Suparat
2019	ทองเอก หมอยา ท่าโฉลง	Thong Ek: The Herbal Master	Chaba	Lead Role	Mario Maurer
2020	ดั่งดวงหฤทัย	Dung Duang Haruetai	Princess Tatsiga	Lead Role	Jesdaporn Pholdee
2021	สองเสน่หา	Song Sanaeha	Pilasluk / Deunyard	Lead Role	James Ma
2023	หมอหลวง	Mor Luang	Bua	Lead Role	Mario Maurer
2023	สืบลับหมอระบาด	Doctor Detective	Jenjira	Lead Role	Nadech Kugimiya
TBA	張立昂張軒睿	Rent Real Boy	Wei Liya		Marcus Chang
TBA	傅孟柏	The Devil of the Helll	Lin Xiang Hei		Fu Meng-po

=== Film ===
Year	Title	Role	Ref(s)
TBA	Mali, The Beautiful Fighter	Mali	

=== Television ===
Year	Title	Role	on
2023	MarkKim + Chef, Season 1	Host	HBO GO

== Discography ==
Year	Title	Notes
2012	"ไว้ใจได้กา"	Punya Chon Kon Krua OST
2012	อย่ามองมาได้ไหม	with Prin Suparat for Punya Chon Kon Krua OST
2016	"Happy Birthday"	with Prin Suparat for Channel 3's 46th Anniversary
2017	"เทวาพาคู่ฝัน"	with Prin Suparat
2017	"สรรเสริญพระบารมี"	with the actors and actress from Channel 3 for ดุจดวงใจไทยทั้งผอง เดอะมิวสิคัล Special OST
2018	"ชีวิตสัมพันธ์"	with Prin Suparat
2020	"Forever มีกันตลอดไป"	with the actors and actress from Channel 3 for 50 ปี Channel 3 Infinity Happiness

== Awards and nominations ==
Year	Award	Category	Nominated work	Result
2010	2010 Top Awards	Best Rising Actress in a Lakorn	Thara Himalai	Nominated
2010	TV3 Fanclub Awards	Popular Rising Star	Thara Himalai	Rank #2
2011	Sudsapda Magazine Awards	Huggable Girl 2011	None	Top 10
2012	Sudsapda Magazine Awards	Huggable Girl 2012	None	Top 10
2012	Seesan Buntherng Awards	Fantasy Couple of the Year	Sarm Noom Nuer Tong	Won
2012	Spicy Magazine Awards	100 Spicy Idol	None	Won
2012	OK Awards	Hot Female Stuff	None	Won
2012	Bang Awards	Girl of the Year 2012	None	Won
2012	TV3 Fanclub Awards	Popular Actress	Punya Chon Kon Krua	Rank #2
2013	27th Golden Television Awards	Best Actress in a Lakorn	Punya Chon Kon Krua	Nominated
2013	Bang Awards	Girl of the Year	Punya Chon Kon Krua	Won
2013	Spicy Magazine Awards	100 Spicy Idol	Punya Chon Kon Krua	Won
2013	Colorful Entertainment Awards	Best Couple of the Year with Prin Suparat	Punya Chon Kon Krua	Won
2013	2nd Born Awards	Born to be Couple with Prin Suparat	Punya Chon Kon Krua	Nominated
2015	EFM Awards	Most Popular Actress	Ab Ruk Online	Won
2015	EFM Awards	Most Popular Actress	Mafia Luerd Mungkorn: Suer	Won
2015	KAZZ Awards	Celebrity of the Year	None	Nominated
2015	KAZZ Awards	Female Actress of the Year	None	Nominated
2016	Dara Daily The Great Awards	Hot Girl of the Year	None	Nominated
2016	KAZZ Awards	Super Star Award	None	Nominated
2016	KAZZ Awards	Most Popular Actress	None	Won
2016	Nine Entertainment Awards	Public's Most Favorite Actress	None	Nominated
2017	OK Awards	Female Heartthrob	None	Won
2019	Thailand Zocial Award 2019	Best Entertainment On Social Media	None	Won
2019	Seesan Awards 2019	Best Couple of the Year with Mario Maurer	Thong Ek: The Herbal Master	Won
2020	Japan Expo Performance Award 2020	Outstanding Performance in a Japanese Drama or Film with Publicity Content (Female)	Dung Duang Haruetai	Won
2021	FEVER Award 2020	Most Talked About	None	Nominated
2021	Content Asia Awards 2021	Best Actress	Song Sanaeha	Won
2021	Seesan Awards 2021	Best Actress of the Year	Song Sanaeha	Won
