= Jessica Pasaphan =

Thai actress

- Born: May 13, 1988 (age 38); New Jersey, United States
- Education: Srinakharinwirot University
- Occupation: Actress
- Years active: 2009–present
- Agent: Channel 3 Thailand (2010–2015)

Jessica Pasaphan (Thai: เจสสิกา ภาสะพันธุ์, RTGS: Chetsika Phasaphan; born 13 May 1988) is a Thai actress. She first appeared in a 2009 film called Slice together with Arak Amornsupasiri, followed by a Thai television drama Pathapee Leh Ruk on Channel 3.

== Filmography ==
=== Dramas ===
Year	Title	Role	Network	Notes
2010	Pathapee Leh Ruk	RungArun "Rung" Krunkafae/Oliang	Channel 3	
2012	Ruk Prakasit 2012	Mallika "Molly"	Channel 3	
2012	Ruk Nee...Hua Jai Mee Krib	Wila	Channel 3	
2013	Manee Sawad	Natsuda	Channel 3	
2013	Ai Koon Pee	Worapanee	Channel 3	
2014	Koo Plub Salub Rang	Phraethong	Channel 3	
2014	Ruk Nee Jhe Jud Hai	Ingon	Channel 3	
2014	Roy Ruk Hak Liam Tawan	Miyoko	Channel 3	
2014	Ruk Tong Om	Patricia "Pat"	Channel 3	
2015	Fai Lang Fai 2015	Donrudee	Channel 3	
2015	Club Friday The Series Season 6: Pid Tee... Wai Jai	Ef	GMM 25	Series in 4 episode
2016	Bua Laeng Nam 2016	Jitpisut Nitinan (Chit)	PPTV	
2016	Mue Prab Sai Daew	Chidapa / Chitnapa Sakulcharoensap (Gigi)	Channel 3	
2016	Dang Ni Dap	Rida	TURE 4U	
2020	Mia Archeep	Me-Ni	Channel 3	
2020	Roy Leh Marnya	Aem's friend	Channel 3	Cameos
202	Tai Ngao Tawan		Channel 3	

=== Television series ===
- 2015 Club Friday The Series Season 6: Pid Tee... Wai Jai (Club Friday The Series 6 ความรักไม่ผิด ตอน ผิดที่ไว้ใจ) (/GMM 25) as Ef (อีฟ) (Series in 4 episode)
- 2021 Let's Fight Ghost (คู่ไฟท์ไฝว้ผี) (True CJ Creations/True4U) as Bow, the lover's partner (EP.10) (โบว์ (รับเชิญ))
- 2022 The Warp Effect (รูปลับรหัสวาร์ป) (The One Enterprise-GMMTV/GMM 25) as (Cameos) ( (รับเชิญ))

=== Films ===
Films
Year	Title	Role	Film Production	Notes
2009	Slice	Noi	Five Star Production	Main Cast

=== Music videos ===
- The Best in the World - Instinct & Lula
- 2012 Tee Soot Nai Lok Feat.Lula (ที่สุดในโลก) - Instinct (Genie Records/YouTube:GMM GRAMMY OFFICIAL)
- 2013 Yah Ow Kow Mah Gure Ruang Nee (อย่าเอาเขามาเกี่ยวเรื่องนี้) - New Jiew (White Music/YouTube:OfficialWhiteMusic)
- 2013 (คืนนี้สบาย) - Tattoo Colour (Smallroom/YouTube:SMALLROOM)
- 2014 (หน้าที่ตัวสำรอง) - Jeerawan Sorn Sa-Ard (True Fantasia/YouTube:True Fantasia)

== Awards ==
Awards
Year	Award	Category	Nominated work	Result
2009	Subhanahonsa Awards	Best Supporting Actress	Slice	Nominated
2010	2010 Top Awards	Best Rising Actress in a Lakorn	Pathapee Leh Ruk	Nominated
