= Thanakrit Panichwid =

Thai actor and singer (born 1985)

Thanakrit Panichwid ธนกฤต พานิชวิทย์
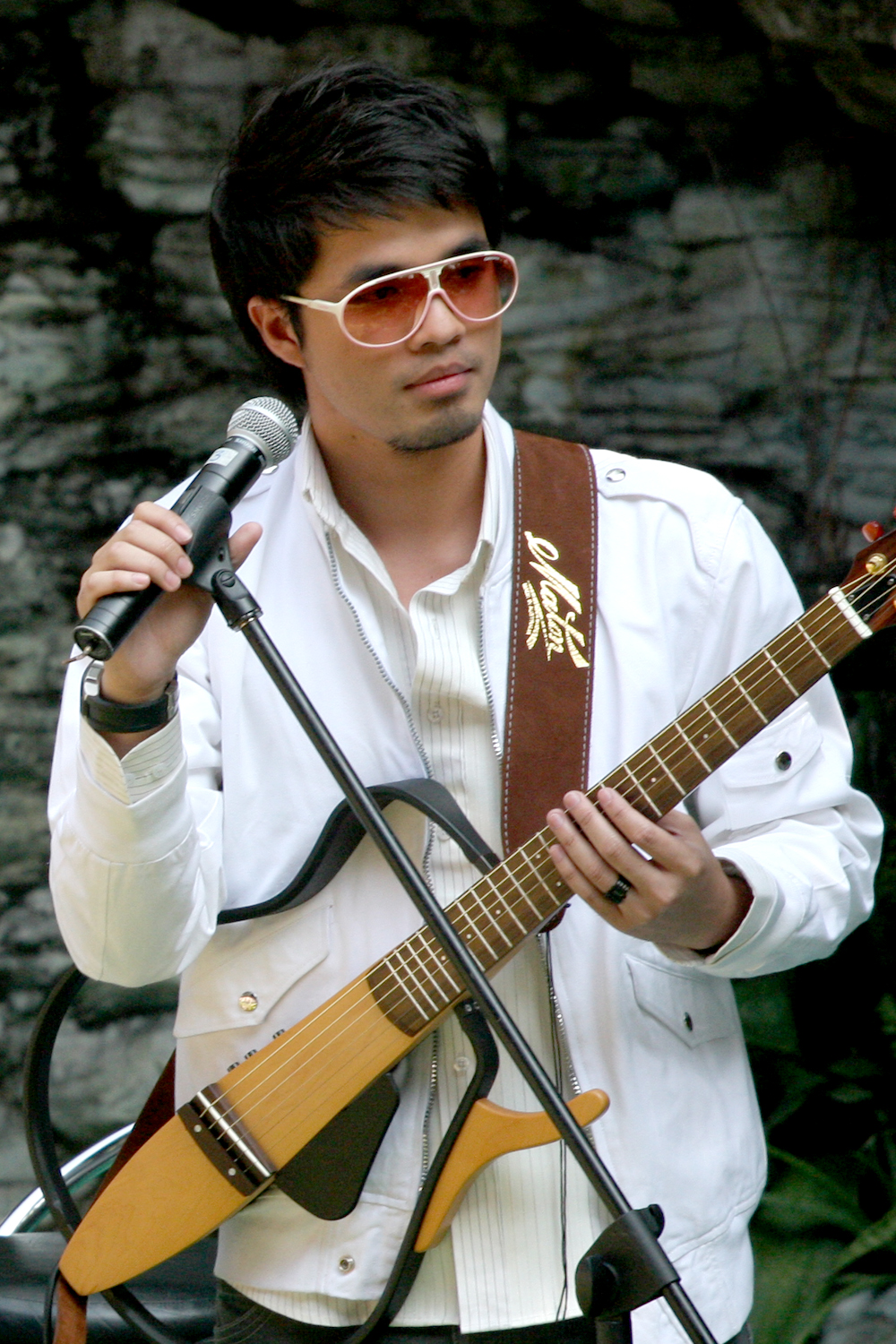
- Thanakrit Panichwid in 2008

Background information
- Also known as: Wan Thanakrit
- Born: 12 August 1985 (age 40); Nonthaburi, Thailand
- Genres: Pop; easy listening
- Occupations: Singer; actor; songwriter
- Years active: 2005–present
- Labels: True Fantasia (2005–2010); GMM Grammy (2010–present)

Thanakrit "Wan" Panichwid (Thai: ธนกฤต พานิชวิทย์, RTGS: Thanakrit Phanitchawit; commonly referred to by nickname and first name as Wan Thanakrit) is a Thai singer and actor. Born on 12 August 1985 in Nonthaburi, Thailand, he is best known as one of the 12 contestants of Academy Fantasia Season 2 and sang the official soundtrack of the Asian sleeper hit movie First Love (A Little Thing Called Love). Wan is currently a DJ at two radio stations. He's a DJ as 89Banana on Monday through Friday from 4 to 6 pm, and at 94EFM on Saturday and Sunday at 2 to 5 pm with Phanupol Ekpetch (Jo AF2). Aside from being a singer, actor, and a DJ, he is also a songwriter. He graduated with a bachelor's degree from Jankasem Rajabhat University (Faculty of Humanities and Social Science); he attended University of Bangkok for master's degree.

== Discography ==
=== Studio albums ===
- Baby Hip-Pro (only sang one song, titled "Waak!!")
- Patibatkarn Ray Kai Fun (with AF2)
- Dream Team (with AF1 and AF2)
- Plam Plam (with Jo AF2 and My AF2)
- Soul Much in Love (with AF1, AF2, and AF3)
- AF The Musical "Ngern Ngern Ngern" Soundtrack
- Wan Soloist (Wan's first solo album/2007)
- AF The Musical "Jojo-san" Soundtrack
- Asoke (3rd Album/2011)

== Filmography ==
=== Dramas ===
- Peun Ruk Nak Lah Fun with AF2 (Ch.7)
- Tang Fah Tawan Diew with Rotmay Kaneungnij Jaksamittanon (Ch.3 2006)
- Kom Ruk Kom Sanae Ha with Rotmay Kaneungnij Jaksamittanon (Ch.ITV 2006)
- Pok Pah Peur Mae (Ch.9 2007)
- Fai Deurn Hah Gub Fon Deurn Hok (Ch.9 2007)
- Ruk Nee Kiang Tawan (Ch.7 2009)
- Tat Dao Bussaya (2009) with Rotmay Kaneungnij Jaksamittanon (Ch.3 2010)
- Ruk Lon Lon 9 Kon 4 Ku (Modern 9 TV 2010)
- Pla Lhai Paai Daeng with Jaja Primrata Dejudom (Ch.3 2011)
- Mia Taeng (Ch.3 2011)
- Under Her Nose (Workpoint 2017)

=== Movies ===
- Yern Pay Lay Say Ma Gu Teh (2007) as Sahat
- Before Valentine Gon Ruk...Moon Rob Tua Rao (2009) as Suthee
- Sweety Movie (2011)

=== Commercials ===
- Honda Click
- Phillip Light Bulb
- 7–11
