= Khemupsorn Sirisukha =

Thai actress (born 1980)

- เข็มอัปสร สิริสุขะ
- Born: 28 August 1980 (age 45); Nan, Thailand
- Other names: Cherry; Cherry Khemupsorn
- Years active: 1996–Present

Khemupsorn "Cherry" Sirisukha (Thai: เข็มอัปสร สิริสุขะ, RTGS: Khem-apson Sirisukha; born 28 August 1980 in Nan Province, Northern Thailand) is a Thai actress. She has acted in a number of dramas, including Kaew Tah Pee and Thur Kue Duang Jai. Besides acting, she is also a model and a host She got Asia Model Festival Awards in 2011.

== Biography ==
Khemupsorn Sirisukha is the third child of Lieutenant general Yutthana Sirisukha and Princess Niramit (née Mahavansanandana), Princess of Nan. She is a sister of Police Major Songprod Sirisukha and Ramavadi "Poupée" Nakchattri. She has ancestry royalty of Nan descent from her mother.

In addition to her work in the entertainment industry, she is also an environmental activist.

== Film ==
- Satang (2000)
- Opapatika (2007)
- The Happiness of Kati (2009)

== TV ==
- Police Jub Khamoey (1996) with Jukrit Ammarat, Thanakorn Poshyananda and Pongpat Wachirabunjong
- a Peesaj (1996)
- Than Chai Kammalor (1996)
- Jub Tai Wai Rai Sai Samorn (1998)
- Khery Likey (1999)
- Fon Tok Khee Moo Lai Khon Arai Ma Pob Kan (1999)
- Phoo Dee E-Sarn (2001)
- Sue 11 Tua (2001)
- Lang Likhit (2001)
- Phae Kao (2002) with Ken Theeradej
- Ley Lub Salub Rang (2002)
- Khun Por Tua Jing Khong Tae(2004)
- Reun Mai See beige (2004)
- Theppabut Nai Fun (2004)
- Dao Long Fah (2005) with Atichart Chumnanon
- Bodyguard Dad Deaw (2005)
- Thur Kue Duang Jai (2006)
- Kaew Tah Pee (2006) - played with Jesdaporn Pholdee
- Pra Jan Son Dao (unreleased)
- Jamleuy Gammathep (2009)
- Mae ka khanom wan(2009) with Mart Krissada
- Nuer Mek (2010) with Chakrit Yamnam
- Rak Ork Arkard (2012)

== Stage play ==
- Onlamarn Lang Ban Saithong
- Thur Kue Duang Jai - The Musical

== Ancestors ==
Ancestors of Khemupsorn Sirisukha

4.
2. Yutthana Sirisukha
5.
1. Khemupsorn Sirisukha
24. Prince Mahavansa of Nan
12.
6. Prince Khamnop Mahavansanandana
13.
3. Princess Niramit Mahavansanandana
28. King Suriyaphong Pharittadet of Nan
14. Prince Ratchawong (Sitthisan Na Nan)
29. Princess Yotla
7. Princess Buntum Na Nan
30. Prince Maha Phrom Surathada of Nan
15. Princess Buakhiao Na Nan
31. Princess Si Sopha
