= Nakhon Sawan School =

- โรงเรียนนครสวรรค์

Location
- Nakhon Sawan, 60000; Thailand; 15.712040°N 100.133235°E

Information
- Type: Government
- Motto: Sukho Paññā Padhilabho (Wisdom is a happiness fortune)
- Established: 1905 (first period), 21 September 1962 (current location)
- Founder: Phra Khru Dhammadhitivongse
- School board: The Secondary Education Service Area Office 42
- Authority: Office of the Basic Education Commission
- Director: Phansak Srithong
- Teaching staff: 107
- Grades: 7–12 (mathayom 1–6)
- Gender: Coeducational
- Campus type: Urban
- Colour: Purple-White
- Song: Nakhon Sawan March
- Website: http://www.nssc.ac.th/

Nakhon Sawan School (Thai: โรงเรียนนครสวรรค์) is a state school and provincial school of Nakhon Sawan, Thailand. Founded in 1905, currently, the school has one of the schools with the large yearly enrolment in the country

== History ==
Phra Khru Dhammadhitivongse (พระครูธรรมฐิติวงศ์), abbot of Wat Photharam, founded the school in 1905 by used sermon hall as school Building, the small school have 23 students in then, in 1910, the government office gave budget for build new building, when the building completed, 9-month later, the building was set on fire, ministry of education gave budget and moved the school to provincial temple (วัดหัวเมือง) and teaching as junior high school

In 1958, ministry of education has approved new land which located in teak forest on foot of the hill and be government property in then, 1962, the school was receive budget 800,000 baht for build 2-class wood school building, Nakhon Sawan's people thought must build concrete building better than, then they gave their money for build the first school building and made stone laying ceremony on 21 September 1962, the school made the day as school's birthday

== List of director ==
No.	Name	Time
1	Phra Khru Dhammadhitivongse (พระครูธรรมธิติวงศ์)	1905–1908
2	Phra Khru Sawan Nagarajan (พระครูสวรรค์นคราจารย์)	1908–1913
3	Khun Banjerd Wichachan (ขุนบรรเจิดวิชาชาญ)	1913–1915
4	Khun Kumarowatha (ขุนกุมาโรวาท)	1915–1919
5	Khun Sekhawutthasueksa (ขุนเสขวุฒิศึกษา)	1919–1922
6	Khun Aphirak Chanya (ขุนอภิรักษ์จรรยา)	1922–1927
7	Mr. Sanit Masaman (นายสนิท มษามาน)	1927–1932
8	Mr. Prasert Charoentoe (นายประเสริฐ เจริญโต)	1932–1934
9	Mr. Luean Wutthayakorn (นายเลื่อน วุฑฒยากร)	1934–1941
10	Mr. Thep Insuwan (นายเทพ อินสุวรรณ)	1941–1942
11	Mr. Thin Ratkanok (นายถิ่น รัติกนก)	1942–1951
12	Mr. Chok Suwannachin (นายโชติ สุวรรณชิน)	1951–1966
13	Mr. Sombat Saengrungrueng (นายสมบัติ แสงรุ่งเรือง)	1966–1971
14	Mr. Phirom Butsayakul (นายภิรมย์ บุษยกุล)	1972–1976
15	Mr. Uthen Charoenkul (นายอุเทน เจริญกูล)	1976–1980
16	Mr. Cheun Srisawat (นายชื่น ศรีสวัสดิ์)	1980–1986
17	Mr. Thiraphon Klangnapha (นายธีรพนธ์ กลางนภา)	1986–1996
18	Mr. Chalerm Hongsamrith (นายเฉลิม หงษ์สัมฤทธิ์)	1996–1999
19	Mr. Wiwat Aniwatkul (นายวิวัฒน์ อนิวรรตกูล)	2000–2003
20	Ms. Bubpha Senawin (นางสาวบุบผา เสนาวิน)	2003–2010
21	Ms. Phenjarat Singhthong (นางสาวเพ็ญจรัส สิงห์ทอง)	2011–2013
22	Mr. Winai Thongman (นายวินัย ทองมั่น)	2014–2016
22	Mr. Phansak Srithong (นายพันศักดิ์ ศรีทอง)	2016–current
