= Natapohn Tameeruks =

Thai actress

- ณฐพร เตมีรักษ์
- Born: Natapohn Tameeruks; February 6, 1989 (age 37); Bangkok, Thailand
- Other name: Taew (แต้ว) / Natapohn Phornprapha (ณฐพร พรประภา)
- Education: Chulalongkorn University (Faculty of Architecture)
- Occupations: Actress; model; YouTubers
- Years active: 2006–present
- Agent: Channel 3 (2006–present)
- Spouse: Pranai Phornprapha (m. 2025)

Natapohn Tameeruks (Thai: ณฐพร เตมีรักษ์; RTGS: Nathaphon Temirak; born 6 February 1989), nicknamed Taew (Thai: แต้ว; RTGS: Taeo), is a Thai actress, usually working for TV3.

== Early life ==
Natapohn Tameeruks, nicknamed Taew, was born on February 6, 1989, to Narong Temirak, a Chief Marshal, and Ruangthong Temirak. She is of mixed Thai and Mon ancestry; her father is an ethnic Mon. She rose to prominence after her appearance with other two Chinese performers, Yi Jianlian and Liu Yifei, in a television advertisement for Yili Group, a Chinese dairy producer. She graduated with a Bachelor's degree in architecture from Chulalongkorn University.

== Personal life ==
Natapohn was in a long-term relationship for 14 years, with Aach Lhaisakul (Ton), whom she first met in high school. Later, both of them ended the relationship, staying as friends only. She then got into a relationship with Pranai Phornprapha, a businessman. They got married on 24 January 2025.

== Filmography ==
=== Films ===
Year	Title	Role	Notes
2006	Dek Hor	Namtarn	cameo
2008	Hormones	Communication Arts student on the train	cameo
2018	Nakee 2	Nakee	cameo
2022	Six Characters	Namfah Daranee	Supporting role

=== Television dramas ===
Year	Title	Role	Notes	Network
2006	Naruk	Naruk	Main role	Channel 3
2008	Prik Tai Gub Bai Kao	Karntisa (Prikthai)	Main role	Channel 3
2008	Sood Tae Jai Ja Kwai Kwa	Wansawang (Sawang)	Main role	Channel 3
2009	Dong Poo Dee	Kom Rattanadechakorn / Kom Roongprai	Main role	Channel 3
2009	Hua Jai Song Park	Tawanchai Ussawarit (Sunny)	Main role	Channel 3
2010	Pieng Jai Tee Pook Pun	Mookpisut Yao (Mook)	Main role	Channel 3
2011	Plerng Torranong	Chonlada (Namfon)	Main role	Channel 3
2012	Phu Pha Prair Mai	Praemai Kulnanwong (Prae)	Main role	Channel 3
2012	Tawan Chai Nai Marn Mak	Tawanchai (Sun)	Main role	Channel 3
2013	Suphapburut Juthathep Series; Khun Chai Rachanon	Princess Soifah	Main role	Channel 3
2013	Khun Chai Ronapee	Princess Soifah	Supporting role	Channel 3
2014	Wiang Roy Dao	Roydao / Meda Badinthorn	Main role	Channel 3
2014	Rising Sun Series: Roy Ruk Hak Liam Tawan	Praewdao Karnjanamethin / Seiko	Main role	Channel 3
2014	Rising Sun Series: Roy Fun Tawan Duerd	Praewdao Karnjanamethin / Seiko	Supporting role	Channel 3
2015	Lom Sorn Ruk	Pattarin Sukonthakarn (Pat)	Main role	Channel 3
2015	Luead Mungkorn: Raed	Pantheera (Pan)	Main role	Channel 3
2016	Nakee	Kumkaew / Jao Mae Nakee	Main role	Channel 3
2017	Rak Nakara	Princess Manmuang	Main role	Channel 3
2018	Nueng Dao Fah Deaw	Mangmao	Main role	Channel 3
2018	Game Sanaeha	Mueanchanok Vatcharumporn (Nok)	Main role	Channel 3
2019	Ruk Jung Aoey	Pailin Thipjinda (Aoey)	Main role	Channel 3
2020	Leh Bunpakarn	Sitang Junlaphok (Tuanai) / Duangkae / Sasina	Main role	Channel 3
2021	Game of Outlaws	Lieutenant Janenaree Kitworakul (Jane)	Main role	Channel 3
2022	Suptar 2550	Herself	Cameo (Ep. 7–8)	Channel 3
2023	Nobody's Happy If I'm Not	Mueanprae Phiphatphol (Prae)	Main role	Channel 3
2024	Kissed by the Rain	Plaifon Phosuwan (Fon) / Fahnapa (Fah)	Main role	Channel 3

== Discography ==
=== Music videos ===
Year	Title	Singer
2004	"Consultants" (ที่ปรึกษา)	Pod Duang
2004	"The Feelings of Those Who Don't Have Heart" (ความรู้สึกของคนหมดใจ)	ZHEEZ
2011	"Leave a Message to The Stars" (ฝากข้อความถึงดวงดาว)	Tae Witsarat
2015	Alright" (มันเป็นใคร)	POLYCAT
2015	"Bind the Heart" (มัดใจ)	Mutmee Pimdao
2016	"Haapy Birthday Channel 3"	Taew with Phupoom Pongpanu
2016	"May be You" (อาจจะเป็นเธอ)	KLEAR Feat. POLYCAT
2019	"Hide" (ซ่อน)	Taew Natapohn (Rak Jung Oei OST)
2019	"Beloved by The Farmhouse" (ขวัญใจบ้านนา)	Taew with Chantavit Dhanasevi, Kong Sarawit, Prim Prima, Por Unnop (Rak Jung Oei OST)
2019	"How Much Miss" (คิดถึงเท่าไหร่)	Taew with Two Popetorn (Gravity Album)
2019	"Meat Ball" (ลูกชิ้น)	Yong Armchair
2020	"KOM TUM" (ก้มต่ำ)	Mindset
2022	"BABYBOO"	TAEW Feat. GAVIN.D
2022	"People Who Remember By Taew Natapohn" (คนที่จดจำ โดย แต้ว ณฐพร)	The Rube Feat. Sunaree Ratchasima
2022	"100%"	TAEW

=== Song / OST ===
Year	Song title	Notes
2015	"Wind Hidden Love" (ลมซ่อนรัก Special Version)	Lom Son Rak OST
2016	"Happy Birthday Channel 3"	
2017	Northern Lullaby (เพลงกล่อมเด็กเหนือ)	Rak Nakara OST
2019	"Hide" (ซ่อน)	Rak Jung Oei OST
2019	"Beloved by The Farmhouse" (ขวัญใจบ้านนา)	Rak Jung Oei OST
2019	"How Much Miss" (คิดถึงเท่าไหร่)	Gravity Album
2020	"Let Me Love You Once Again" (ให้ฉันรักเธออีกครั้ง)	Leh Banpakarn OST
2022	"BABYBOO"	
2022	"100%"	

=== Concerts ===
- LOVE IS IN THE AIR : Channel 3 Charity Concert (2017)
- BABB BIRD BIRD SHOW #11-2018 : DREAM JOURNEY (Special Guest) (2018)
- The Return Of BBB #11 (Restage) (Special Guest) (2019)
- Kru Koy and The Gang Presents... Let's be Heroes Concert (2019)
- CH3Plus The Moment: GULF The Next Stage Livestream Concert (2021)

== MC ==
Online

- 20 : On Air YouTube:taewaew_natapohn

== Awards and nominations ==
Year	Award	Category	Nominated work	Result
2008	TV3 FAN CLUB STAR AWARD	Female Rising Star	Sud Tae Jai Ja Kwai Kwa	Won
2010	24th Golden TV Awards	Best Actress in a Leading Role	Dong Phu Dee	Nominated
2014	28th Golden TV Awards	Best Actress in a Leading Role	Khun Chai Ratchanon	Won
2014	11th Kom Chad Luek Awards	Best Actress	Khun Chai Ratchanon	Won
2014	5th Nataraj Awards	Best Actress	Khun Chai Ratchanon	Nominated
2014	5th Nataraj Awards	Best Team	Khun Chai Ratchanon	Nominated
2014	7th Siam Dara Star Awards	Beautiful Female Star Award	—N/a	Won
2014	HAMBURGER Best Cover Ever	Person of the Year From The Cover	—N/a	Won
2014	Seesan Bunturng Awards	Charming Female of the Year with Urassaya Sperbund	Roy Rak Hak Liam Tawan	Won
2015	9th Kazz Awards	Popular Female Star	—N/a	Won
2015	8th Siam Dara Star Awards	Best Female Lead	Lom Son Rak	Nominated
2015	8th Siam Dara Star Awards	Popular Vote	—N/a	Nominated
2015	5th Daradaily The Great Awards	Best Actress in a Leading Role	Lom Son Rak	Nominated
2015	30th Golden TV Awards	Best Actress in a Leading Role	Lom Son Rak	Nominated
2017	31st Golden TV Awards	Best Actress in a Leading Role	Nakee	Won
2017	6th Daradaily The Great Awards	Hot Girl of the Year	—N/a	Nominated
2017	6th Daradaily The Great Awards	Best Actress in a Leading Role	Nakee	Nominated
2017	5th HOWE AWARDS	Shining Star	Nakee	Won
2017	7th Mthai Top-Talk Awards	Top Talk-About Actress	Nakee	Won
2017	11th Kazz Awards	Top Girl of the Year	—N/a	Won
2017	11th Kazz Awards	Best Actress of the Year	Nakee	Won
2017	10th Nine Entertain Awards	Best Actress	Nakee	Won
2017	14th Kom Chad Luek Awards	Best Actress	Nakee	Nominated
2017	8th Nataraj Awards	Best Actress	Nakee	Won
2017	8th Nataraj Awards	Best Team	Nakee	Won
2018	Seesan Bunturng Awards	Best Actress	Rak Nakara	Won
2018	32nd Golden TV Awards	Best Actress in a Leading Role	Rak Nakara	Nominated
2018	12th Kazz Awards	Superstar Award (Female)	—N/a	Won
2018	11th Nine Entertain Awards	Public Favorite	—N/a	Nominated
2018	9th Nataraj Awards	Best Actress	Rak Nakara	Nominated
2018	1st White TV Awards	Outstanding Female Lead Actress	Nueng Dao Fah Deaw	Nominated
2019	33rd Golden TV Awards	Best Actress in a Leading Role	Nueng Dao Fah Deaw	Nominated
2019	33rd Golden TV Awards	Best Actress	Game Sanaeha, Nueng Dao Fah Deaw	Won
2019	7th HOWE AWARDS	Best Actress Award	Game Sanaeha, Nueng Dao Fah Deaw	Won
2019	15th Kom Chad Luek Awards	Popular Actress	Game Sanaeha, Nueng Dao Fah Deaw	Nominated
2019	9th Mthai Top-Talk Awards	Top Talk-About Actress	Game Sanaeha	Nominated
2019	12th Nine Entertain Awards	Best Actress	Game Sanaeha, Nueng Dao Fah Deaw	Nominated

2019 KAZZ AWARDS Best Couple with Jirayu Tangsrisuk (Nominated)

2020 Thai Crazy Awards Best Couple Award with Jirayu Tangarisuk (Won)
