= Chalida Vijitvongthong =

Thai actress (born 1993)

- ชาลิดา วิจิตรวงศ์ทอง
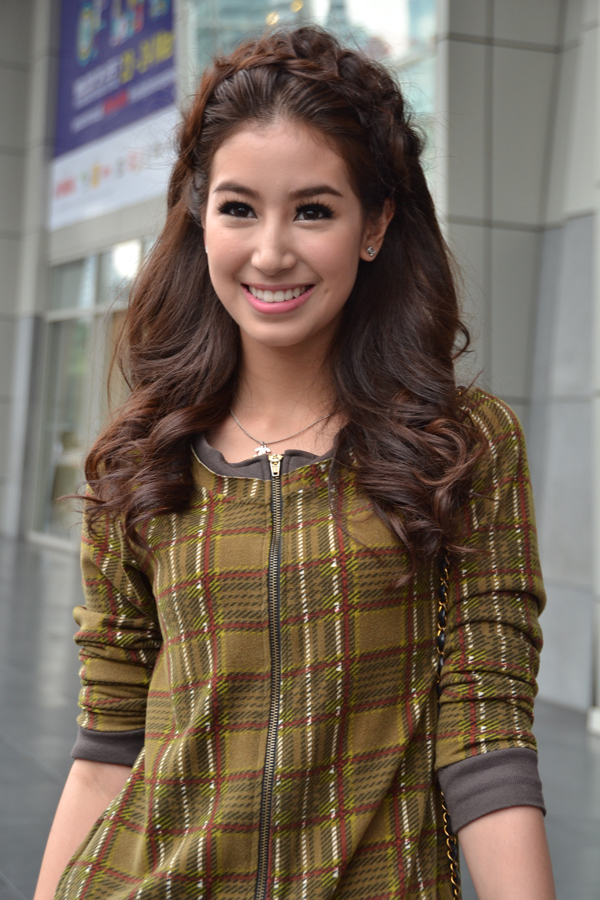
- Chalida in 2013
- Born: Chalida Vijitvongthong; August 8, 1993 (age 32); Bangkok, Thailand
- Other name: Mint
- Years active: 2006–present
- Agent: Channel 3 (2006–2023)
- Partner: Pupaa Taechanarong

Mint Chalida Vijitvongthong (Thai: ชาลิดา วิจิตรวงศ์ทอง, RTGS: Chalida Wichitwongthong; August 8, 1993) is a Thai actress.

== Career ==
Chalida Vijitvongthong is of Chinese and Indian descent. She first started her acting career in television commercials and made her acting breakthrough when she appears in 4 Huajai Hae Koon Kao or 4 Hearts of the Mountain in Channel 3 as Cher-Aim where she was paired with rookie actor Prin Suparat and gained popularity having a fan-base together with co-star Prin Suparat known as M&M or MM which stands for both their nicknames Mint and Mark.

By 2011, she once again reunited with Pathapee Leh Ruk co-star Prin Suparat and Urassaya Sperbund in a Western-style drama called Tawan Deard but this time not as his leading lady, where she plays Ploy Kwan, Urassaya's younger sister. In the same year, she got cast in Ruk Pathiharn which she co-star with Alex Rendell as her leading man and Kimberly Ann Voltemas as one of the leading ladies in 4 Huajai Hae Koon Kao.

By 2012, she was once again reunited with Prin Suparat whom she worked with, in her other 2 dramas, this time in Nuer Mek 2 the sequel of 2010s Nuer Mek which starred Chakrit Yamnarm and Khemapsorn Sirisukha, this drama is cut off by the Thai government due "Political Issues". Chalida was then cast in a 5 series drama of Channel 3 called Suparburoot Juthathep revolving around the story of 5 brothers which she starred together with rookie actor James Ma who is having his acting debut in this drama, in this drama Chalida was praised by her improved acting skills despite her acting issues in her first leading role in Pathapee Leh Ruk.

By 2014 and 2015, Chalida was cast in the romantic-comedy drama Cubic in which she played the character of Ruthainak a kind-hearted yet outgoing young lady who is replaced by her father with her sister in order to pay for their debt with the mafia boss Lin Lan Ser which was played by rookie actor Tanin Manunsilp who also plays one of the 5 brothers in Suparburoot Juthatep which he won rising actor. After Cubic, Chalida was set to play in Kaew Ta Warn Jai opposite Pakorn Chatborirak, followed by the drama Song Huajai Nee Puea Tur which she will play together with famous Thai actor Mario Maurer.

== Filmography ==
=== Television ===
Year	Thai Title	Title	English Title	Role	Network	Notes	Ref.
2006	น่ารัก	Naruk	Cute	Kim	Channel 3	Supporting Role	
2006	เทใจรัก นักวางแผน	Tae Jai Ruk Nak Wang Pan	Pour Love Planners	Herself	Channel 3	Guest	
2008	สุดแต่ใจจะไขว่คว้า	Sood Tae Jai Kwai Kwa	As Far as Your Heart Will Reach	Pinrom	Channel 3	Supporting Role	
2009	ดงผู้ดี	Dong Poo Dee	Blue Blood Territory	Pojanee Rattanadechakorn	Channel 3	Supporting Role	
2010	หวานใจนายจอมหยิ่ง	Wan Jai Gub Nai Jom Ying	Miss Sweetheart and Mr. Arrogant	Kun Phongwalaiporn	Channel 3	Main Cast	
2010	ดวงใจอัคนี	Duang Jai Akkanee	Akkanee's Heart	Cher-Aim Vongvanisakunkit/Vongvai	Channel 3	Guest	
2010	ปฐพีเล่ห์รัก	Pathapee Leh Ruk	Pathapee's Trick	Cher-Aim Vongvanisakunkit/Vongvai	Channel 3	Lead Role	
2010	วายุภัคมนตรา	Wayupak Montra	Wayupak's Enchantment	Cher-Aim Vonvanisakunkit	Channel 3	Main Cast	
2011	ตะวันเดือด	Tawan Deard	Boiling Sun	Ploy Kwan	Channel 3	Main Cast	
2011	รักปาฏิหาริย์	Ruk Pathiharn	Miracle of Love	M.L. Pimnaruemol Nawapas	Channel 3	Main Cast	
2012	เหนือเมฆ	Nuer Mek 2	Beyond Comparison 2	M.D. Praepailin Nivayakul	Channel 3	Lead Role	
2013	คุณชายรณพีร์	Khun Chai Ronapee	Khun Chai Ronapee	Piangkwan Janpradub	Channel 3	Lead Role	
2014	คิวบิก	Cubic	Cubic	Ruethainak "Ruthai" Ritthivong	Channel 3	Lead Role	
2015	แก้วตาหวานใจ	Kaew Ta Warn Jai	Sweetheart of My Eyes	Kaiwarn "Warn" Ruangrit	Channel 3	Lead Role	
2015	สองหัวใจนี้เพื่อเธอ	Song Huajai Nee Puea Tur	Two Spirit's Love	Kewalin/Kaew	Channel 3	Lead Role	
2017	รักหลงโรง	Ruk Long Rohng	Love Lost Theater	Kirana/Kaew/Grand	Channel 3	Lead Role	
2017	สายธารหัวใจ	Sai Tarn Hua Jai		Siriganya	Channel 3	Lead Role	
2018	หน่วยลับสลับเลิฟ	Nuay Lub Salub Love		Nubdao	Channel 3	Lead Role	
2020	ฟ้าฝากรัก	Fah Fak Rak			Channel 3	Lead Role	
2020	ดวงแบบนี้ไม่มีจู๋	Doung Beb Nee MaiMee Ju	My Precious Bad Luck	Lukkana "Gie"	Channel 3	Lead Role	
2021	ซ่านเสน่หา	Saan Sanaeha	Sun's Affection	Lalita	Channel 3	Lead Role	
TBA	ใจพิสุทธิ์	Jai Phi Sut	Jaiphisut	Piangkwan Juthathep Na Ayutthaya	Channel 3	Guest	

=== Awards and nominations ===
Year	Award	Category	Nominated work	Result	Ref.
2010	2010 Top Awards	Best Rising Actress in a Lakorn	Pathapee Leh Ruk	Nominated	
2010	2nd Nataraj Awards	Best Actress	4 Huajai Haeng Koon Kao	Nominated	
2011	3rd Nataraj Awards	Best Actress	Tawan Deard	Nominated	
2012	Excellence Awards	Excellent Teen Years	None	Won	
2013	100 Most Spicy Idol	100 Most Spicy	None	Won	
2013	Siam Dara Star Awards	Heart Stabbing Beauty	None	Won	
2013	Clean Bouquet of the Year	Actress of the Year	Nuer Mek 2	Won	
2014	Holiness of the Year Award	Good Actress	None	Won	
2014	Star Light Awards	Charming Actress	None	Won	
2015	Dara Daily the Great Awards	Leading Female Actress of the Year	Song Huajai Nee Puea Tur	Nominated	
2015	Dara Daily the Great Awards	Hot Girl of the Year	Song Huajai Nee Puea Tur	Nominated	
2015	True Life Award	Actress of the Year	Song Huajai Nee Puea Tur	Nominated	
2016	4th National Television Awards	Best Actress in a Lakorn	Song Huajai Nee Puea Tur	Won	
2016	13th Sharp Awards	Most Popular Actress	Song Huajai Nee Puea Tur	Nominated	
2016	Maya Awards	Public's Most Favorite Actress	Song Huajai Nee Puea Tur	Nominated	
2016	Cultural Ambassador Awards	None	None	Won	
2017	Be Link Awards	Best Actress	None	Won	
2017	Maya Awards	Ship Of the Year (With Mario Maurer)	None	Won	

=== Discography ===
Title	Notes	Ref.
"Old Wound"	Music Video	
"Yot Num Tah"	Music Video	
"Khon Tee Tur Mai Ruk"	Music Video	
