= Alexander Rendell =

Thai actor

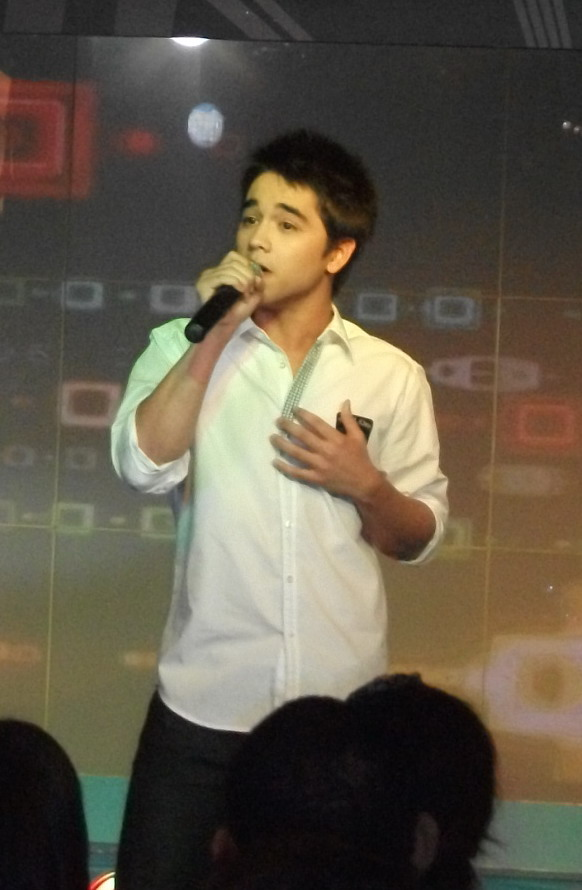
- Alexander singing in 2009
- Born: Alexander Simon Rendell; 9 January 1990 (age 36); Jakarta, Indonesia
- Education: Chulalongkorn University (Faculty of Communication Arts)
- Years active: 1994–present
- Agent: Channel 3 (2006–present)
- Height: 1.72 m (5 ft 7 1/2 in)
- Spouse: Jenny Rendell (m. 2025)
- Children: 1
- Website: http://www.alexrendell.com/

Alexander Simon "Alex" Rendell (Thai: อเล็กซานเดอร์ ไซม่อน เรนเดลล์; born 9 January 1990) or Nirawit Rendell (Thai: นิรวิทย์ เรนเดลล์), is a British-Thai actor, singer, environmentalist and UNEP Goodwill ambassador who has starred in Thai films such as The Tesseract (2003), Indiana Joai: Elephant Cemetery (2003), Pisaj (2004) and 13 Beloved (2006). Alexander is also the co-founder and chief executive officer of the Environmental Education Center Thailand (EEC Thailand) founded in 2015 and the first Thai UNEP Goodwill Ambassador, appointed on 5 June 2020.

== Early life and education ==
Alexander Simon Rendell was born in Jakarta, Indonesia on 9 January 1990 to Thai mother Duangsom and British father Benjamin Rendell. He has an older sister, Bonita Rendell, and an older brother, Simon Rendell. In Jakarta, his father had been working as a chef and the family resided in Indonesia before moving back to Bangkok, Thailand when he was 4 years old. Also, Alexander's career started at age 4 when he first appeared in 40 commercials in Thailand. At age 10, Alexander met conservationist Kru Alonkot Chukaew at Koh Yai, Thailand while he was doing research on wild elephants. Kru later became a mentor for Alexander where Alexander became a student and started helping injured elephants. At age 16, he changed his first contract with Channel 3 as an actor.

In 2008, he graduated from Bangkok Patana School, and attended the Faculty of Communication Arts, International Program, Chulalongkorn University. He graduated in 2012 and has diverted his full attention to series/movies. Alexander also has a master's degree in environmental social science.

== Career ==
As a singer, Alexander prefers solo shows such as provincial events and usually organizes them himself over having a manager.

== Environmentalism ==
Alexander was first exposed to diving on a holiday in the Maldives. The hotel he was residing at was also offering DSD programs and after two weeks he became a PADI Open water diver. Diving would later influence Alexander to become an environmentalist as it made him grew to love the ocean. His diving today mostly concerns conservation. For his role in environmentalism, he was appointed by the United Nations Environmental Programme one 5 June 2020 as a Goodwill Ambassador, the first person from Thailand to hold the title.

=== EEC Thailand ===
In 2015, Alexander co-founded the Environmental Education Center Thailand (EEC Thailand) with Kru Alonkot Chukaew with the goal of raising the public's awareness and understanding around the environment as well as to promote sustainable use of natural resources. One of the main accomplishments of EEC is education around a 1000 children each year as well as conversation projects for endagendered sea and land creatures in Thailand. The organization operates 150 camps within Thailand.

== Personal life ==
Rendell enjoys playing football and supports Manchester United. He has played for his Highschool - Bangkok Patana and helped clinch multiple BISAC & SEASAC trophies. His favourite number is 22 and he is part of PUAKKUA since 1993/1994. One of his favourite diving spots in Thailand is Koh Haa lagoon, near Koh Lanta. Apart from diving, Alexander also enjoys cycling.

== Discography ==
=== ost ===
- เพลง "แพ้อากาศ" ในอัลบั้ม คอนเวอร์เจนซ์เลิฟวัน
- เพลง "นกไม่เห็นฟ้า ปลาไม่เห็นน้ำ"
- เพลง "หากฉันรู้" ประกอบละคร อาคม

=== Concerts ===
Concert	Date	Place	Artists
LOVE IS IN THE AIR : CHANNEL3 CHARITY CONCERT	29 April 2017	Impact, Muang Thong Thani	All Channel 3 actors

== Filmography ==
=== Film ===
Year	Title	Role	Notes
2003	Final Combat		
2003	The Tesseract	Wit	
2003	Indiana Joai: Elephant Cemetery		
2004	Pisaj	Arm	
2004	Peter Pan	Peter Pan	Dubbed Voice
2006	13 Beloved	Tay	
2010	Thad Hang Ploy Wat Series The Movie	Jod	
2011	Lud 4 Lud	Tor	
2011	Love Julinsee (Ruk Man Yai Mak)	Yoh	
2013	Hashima Project	Aof	

=== Television Dramas ===
Year	Title	Role	Network	Notes
1998	The Hitman Story	Boy Chanayus	Channel 7	
1999	Khun Chai	Dong (Childhood)	Channel 7	
1999	Ruk Sud Tai Tee Plai Fah	Mangpor	Channel 3	
1999	Saeng Tian	Thit	Channel 7	Series honoring His Majesty the King
2000	Yord Cheewun		Channel 3	
2001	Tong Poon Kohk Por Radon Dtem Kan		Channel 3	
2001	Keb Pandin	Naka	Channel 7	
2001	Pee Lieng Gor Samret Roop	Art	Channel 3	
2002	Luk Poo Chai	Manoch (Childhood)	Channel 7	
2002	Baung Ban Ja Torn	Laemthong	Channel 7	
2002	Sao Noi Tha Kieng Kaew	Pong	Channel 7	
2002	Mae Yai Tee Ruk	Wanrob / "Rob" [Young]	Channel 3	
2003	Kroom Som See		Channel 7	
2003	Kasattriya	Ekathotsarot [Young]	Channel 5	
2004	Rak Sud Kouw		Channel 3	
2005	Mor Pee Cyber		Channel 7	
2006	Kadee Ded...Haed Haeng Ruk	Ron	Channel 7	
2006	Sadut Ruk	Young Krit	Channel 3	
2006	Bua Prim Nam		Channel 3	
2007	Ma Nee Din	Pokpong	Channel 3	
2008	Prik Tai Gub Bai Kao	Pon	Channel 3	
2008	Sood Tae Jai Ja Kwai Kwa	Pattana "Pat"	Channel 3	
2009	Plerng See Roong	Kuat	Channel 3	Cameo
2010	3 Hua Jai	Chat	Channel 3	
2011	Sapai Mai Rai Sakdena	Geng	Channel 3	
2011	Ruk Pathiharn	Rawipaat	Channel 3	
2012	Hong Sabud Lai	Yutsawee "Wee"/ Don	Channel 3	
2013	Rang Pratana	Poowadon	Channel 3	
2013	Samee	Ram Lin Watanatawakorn	Channel 3	
2013	Saap Pra Peng		Channel 3	
2014	Ruk Tong Om	Himself	Channel 3	Cameo
2014	Suay Rai Sai Lub		Channel 3	
2014	Sam Bai Mai Thao	Saengchan	Channel 3	
2016	Luerd Ruk Toranong	H.S.H. Banbariwat	Channel 3	
2017	Arkom	Arkom	Channel 3	
2017	Sai Tarn Hua Jai	Sawat	Channel 3	
2018	Kom Faek (2018)	Plerng Gumpanard	Channel 3	
2018	Pbee Kaew Nang Hong	Sinthorn (Sin)	Channel 3	
2019	Rak Jang Aoey	Plerng Gumpanard	Channel 3	Cameo
2019	Tee Krai Tee Mun	Akira	Channel 3	
2021	Sud Rai Sud Rak	Don't	Channel 3	

== Awards ==
Year	Award	Category/Reason	Nominated work	Notes
2013	Golden Television Award	No. 28 Outstanding Male Supporting Actor	Samee	
2013	The 5th Dance Award	Best Supporting Actor	Samee	
2013	Kom Chad Lueu Award 11	Best Supporting Actor	Samee	
2014	Nine Entertainment Awards	Male Actor of the Year	Samee	
2016	M Thai Top Talk	Most talked about male branch		
2019	Gen.T (Thailand)	Inspiring young people to protect the planet		
