= Vachirawit Chivaaree discography =

Bright Vachirawit's singles, OST and concerts

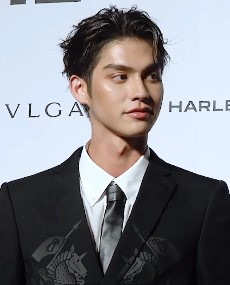
- Vachirawit in 2022
- Studio albums: 8
- Singles: 9
- Concerts: 63
- OST: 9
- Music Video appearance: 19
- Collab/ Promotional songs: 7

The discography of Vachirawit Chivaaree consists of his elaborated music career, his singles, soundtracks of several series, live concerts within Thailand and across South-East Asia countries, his music video appearances for other singers and few collaborations. He is popular for song "Lost & Found" and for mini album Adolescent. In 2023, he became independent artist under his own agency Cloud9 Entertainment.

== Musical career ==
=== 2020-2023: Rising popularity ===
Bright appeared in various music videos during his early years of his career. In July 2020, his first OPM song cover "With a Smile" was released as the official theme for the Filipino-dubbed Still 2gether series in the Philippines.

In 2021, Bright is youngest male artist to receive the "Best Song Drama" in 12th Nataraja Awards for his song "Kan Goo" in Thailand. His songs "Kan Goo" and "Yang Koo Gun" got featured in "Thai: Best song of the year 2020".

In 2021, Bright performed a duet with Tiara Andini at the Giveaway Roboguru Show, in Indonesia. He also collaborated with the rapper F.Hero for the song "Sad Movie" and won the "Music of the week" at the "T-pop Stage Award". His first Thai single "Unmovable" is from the Boys Don't Cry project, a compilation album. For this song, he won "Rookie of the Week" in "T-pop Stage Award".

In 2022, Bright released his first English single "Lost & Found". His song "Good Times", with Kanyawee Songmuang, received positive reviews. In 2023, Singaporean Prime Minister Lee Hsien Loong used "Good Times" song for promotional political video during his visit in Thailand. He featured in the T-pop shows held in Thailand and Japan. He had successful stint during musical concerts "Shooting Star", across South-East Asian countries.

In January 2023, he released his single "My Ecstasy" feat D. Gerrard from his mini album Adolescent under GMMTV's new record label RISER Music, where he was creative director. This song became top requested song on HITZ 955, Thailand. In April 2023, he participated in Rolling Loud 2023, the world's largest hip-hop music festival, in Pattaya, Thailand. Recently, he appeared in Filipino based singer Zack Tabudlo's MV “Turn Back Time”.

=== 2024 onwards: present ===
In 2024, Bright concentrated mainly on his musical career, he participated in The Kingdom and Home Party event in Thailand, Japan and Indonesia. He performed in Summer Sonic Festival, WOWOW was official TV broadcaster. He released his singles Long Run & Sleeping Pills along with Thai song writer Thammathai Phalangsilp (Timethai), both the songs received decent reception. On 11 August 2024, he got an opportunity to perform in a special program at NHK Expo event, which was broadcast by NHK, a widely broadcasting Japanese company. He debuted at 88rising with his single Long Showers. He surpassed 100M streams across all his credits on Spotify, and his YouTube gained 'Musical Note Badge', an Official Artist Channel (OAC).

== Singles ==
Year	Title	Label	Ref.
2021	Unmovable (Move ไปไหน)	GMMTV Records	
2022	Lost & Found	GMMTV Records	
2023	My Ecstasy ft. D. Gerrard	RISER Music	
2023	Saturday Night	RISER Music	
2023	I Think of You	RISER Music	
2023	Try ft. Matcha Mosimann	RISER Music	
2024	Long Run	Cloud9 Entertainment	
2024	Sleepin' Pill ft. TimeThai	Cloud9 Entertainment	
2024	Long Shower	88rising	

== OST ==
Year	Title	Series/ Films	Label	Ref.
2020	Kan Goo	2gether: The Series	GMMTV Records	
2020	Mistaken (Tok Long Chan Kid Pai Aeng Chai Mai)	2gether: The Series	GMMTV Records	
2020	Yang Koo Gun	Still 2gether	GMMTV Records	
2021	One Hug (Kod Tee)	2gether: The Movie	GMMTV Records	
2021	Who Am I	F4 Thailand	GMMTV Records	
2021	Shooting Star	F4 Thailand	GMMTV Records	
2022	Nighttime	F4 Thailand	GMMTV Records	
2022	Good Time with Kanyawee Songmuang	Good Old Days	GMMTV Records	
2024	Na Na Thong; Original Joey Phuwasit	Love You To Debt	GMMTV Records	

=== Special album ===
On 2021, special album during promotion of 2gether: The Movie was released. The CD version included booklet with Thai lyrics for songs featured in the franchisee, parallel translations in Japanese and English, along with signatures of Bright. The album ranked in decent ranks in Japan based music billboards. It debuted at 3rd rank on Oricon Daily Album Charts, ranked 7th on Oricon Weekly Album Charts and 4th on Billboard Japan Weekly Album Sales.

Release Date: June 4, 2021
Distribution: August 25
CD Label: GMMTV Company Limited
Distributor: Universal Music LLC
Release Country: Japan

== Bright's Home Party concerts ==
Bright along with his band launched 'The Home Party' concerts across Asia under his own event management company Cloud9 Entertainment.

No.	Date	Venue	Location	Ref.
1	23–24 December 2023	Queen Sirikit National Convention Center (QSNCC)	Bangkok Thailand	
2	20–21 April 2024	Tokyo Metropolitan Gymnasium	Sendagaya Japan	
3	9 November 2024	Jakarta International Velodrome	Jakarta Indonesia	

== Music festivals and concerts ==
Year	Date	Title	Venue	Notes	Ref.
2020	20 June	Global Live Fan Meeting	V Live	Bright Livestream	
2020	17-18 October	Live on Stage	Union Hall	With 2gether Cast	
2020	21-22 November	Fantopia	Impact Arena	Bright and various artists	
2020	5 December	Manila Live The Virtual Fan Meet	KTX.PH	Bright connects	
2021	9 September	1st Fan Meeting in Japan	PIA Live Stream, Japan	Bright connects	
2021	19 October	Globe Friendship Meet	LiveNowPH	Bright connects	
2021	12 December	11th Big Mountain Music Festival	The Ocean Khao Yai	Various artists	
2022	20 August	Love Out Loud Fan Fest 2022	Impact Arena	With Perawat Sangpotirat, Prachaya Ruangroj, Jumpol Adulkittiporn, Atthaphan Phunsawat, Tawan Vihokratana, Thitipoom Techaapaikhun and Win Metawin	
2022	27-28 August	GMMTV Fan Fest Live	PIA Arena MM, Yokohama	GMMTV artists	
2022	16 October	Octopop 2022	Rajamangala National Stadium	Various Artists	
2022	12 November	Cat Expo 9	Wonder World Extreme Park	Nanon x Bright	
2022	10 December	Pepsi 12th Big Mountain Music Festival	The Ocean Khao Yai	Bright Vachirawit, Nanon Korapat Kirdpan, F. Hero and other artists	
2023	5 April	Get Rising To Riser Concert	Square A, Central World	Riser Music artists and bands	
2023	13 April	Rolling Loud Music Festival	Legend Siam, Pattaya	F.Hero, Bright and Various Artists	
2023	29 April	Nang Lay 2 Beach and Party Music Festival	Triple Tree Beach Resort, Cha-Am	Bright Vachirawit and Nanon Korapat Kirdpan	
2023	30 April	FungThon Fest	Sermsuk Warehouse	Bright and Various Artists	
2023	16 May	Matcha Angelogy Stage	Central World Live	Guest Artist	
2023	27 August	Adolescent Live Session	Lido Connect Hall	Bright Vachirawit (Guest: Matcha Mosimann)	
2023	7 October	Viu Scream Dates	Union Hall	F4 Thailand cast	
2023	22 October	Octopop 2023	Thunderdome Stadium	Bright and band	
2023	22-23 November	MTV Video Music Awards Japan (VMAJ) 2023	K Arena, Yokohama	Own Stage	
2023	25 November	Yes 99 Hits Festival	Indoor Stadium, Singapore	Own Stage	
2023	9 December	Gulf Phenomenal Super Match 2023	MCC Hall The Mall Lifestore Bangkapi	Gulf Kanawut, F.Hero feat Bright	
2023	31 December	Krist Bright Countdown Concert in Japan	Toyosu PIT, Tokyo	Bright Solo Stage	
2024	3-4 February	กาลครั้ง 5 Tattoo Colour Fest	Impact Arena	Guest	
2024	9 March	Viva La Vespa Festival & Caravan	Wonder World Extreme Park	Own Stage	
2024	23 March	Piano & I The Magic 7 Concert	Queen Sirikit National Convention Center (QSNCC)	Guest artist	
2024	6-7 April	Next Generation Live Arena 2024	PIA Arena MM, Yokohama	Own Stage	
2024	4 May	Cosmos Bear Music Festival	Outdoor Arena, Bravo BKK	Own Stage	
2024	1-2 June	The Kingdoms Concert	Impact Arena	King of the Cloud with Tanont Chumroen, Jeff Satur, and The Toys	
2024	11 August	NHK	Shibuya, Japan	Enhypen, Tomorrow X Together, ME:I, Atarashii Gakkou no Leaders, Illit & Bright	
2024	17 August	Summer Sonic Festival	ZOZO Marine Stadium & Makuhari Messe, Tokyo	Pacific Stage	
2024	18 August	Summer Sonic Festival	Expo'70 Commemorative Park, Osaka	Massive Stage	
2024	24 August	Summer Sonic Festival	Impact Challenger Hall, Bangkok		
2024	25 December	Siam Paragon Glorious Event, Bangkok	Parc Paragon MF	Gulf Kanawut & Bright	
2024	30-31 December	Countdown Concert in Japan	Toyosu PIT, Tokyo	Gulf Kanawut, F.Hero & Bright	

== Singing journals ==
Year	Title	Label	Artist	Ref.
2020	Thank You to My Silent Heroes: English Version	Olympics Thailand	with Ada Chunhavajira and Metawin	
2020	With a Smile (Eraserheads song)	ABS-CBN; Star Music	Various Artists	
2020	Tup Tup Jup Jup OK (ตุ๊บๆจุ๊บๆOK)	GMMTV Records	with Perawat Sangpotirat, Prachaya Ruangroj, Jumpol Adulkittiporn, Atthaphan Phunsawat and Metawin	
2021	From the Heart (ขอบคุณที่ร่วมทาง)	Special Olympics Thailand	with Ada Chunhavajira and Metawin	
2021	Sad Movie	Highcloud Entertainment	with Nattawut Srimhok (F. Hero)	
2022	You Make Me Smile	GMMTV Records	Various Artists	
2022	Law of Attraction	GMMTV Records	with Perawat Sangpotirat, Prachaya Ruangroj, Jumpol Adulkittiporn, Atthaphan Phunsawat, Tawan Vihokratana, Thitipoom Techaapaikhun and Metawin	

== Music video appearances ==
Year	Title	Artist	Channel	Ref.
2013	"Kot Mai Dai" (กอดไม่ได้)	Bedroom Audio	Crispy Sound Official	
2018	"Pi Sat" (ปีศาจ)	Natthawut Jenmana (Max)	Ost. Social Death Vote	
2018	"Ao Mai" (เอามั้ย)	Numchok Tanudrum (Singto) & Popetorn Soonthornyanakij (Two)	Whattheduck	
2018	"Raung Hai Kon Diow" (ร้องไห้คนเดียว)	Muzu	Official White Music	
2019	"Kon Derm" (คนเดิม)	Napassorn Phuthornjai (New)	Official White Music	
2019	"Your Story" (แค่หน้าจอ)	Pam Anshisa	Wayfer Records	
2020	"Tam Ta Wan" (ตามตะวัน)	Num Kala & Add Carabao	Genierock	
2020	"Tit Gub" (ติดกับ)	Natthawut Jenmana	GMMTV Records	
2022	"Kob Kandee Sak True" (คบกันดีสักทรูู)	WANYAi x STAMP	TRUE 5G	
2022	"To the Max"	Milli	YUPP!	
2022	"Along the Way" (ทุกวันพรุ่งนี้)	Tilly Birds x Palmy	Gene Lab	
2022	"One Last Cry"; F4 Thailand	Violette Wautier	GMMTV Records	
2022	"You Mean the World" (โลกของฉันคือเธอ); F4 Thailand	Fluke Gawin	GMMTV Records	
2022	"Counting Stars" (นับดาว); Astrophile	Fluke Gawin	GMMTV Records	
2022	"Just Say You Love Me" (สมัยนี้เค้าไม่แอบรัก); Astrophile	Mook Worranit	GMMTV Records	
2022	Good Old Days OST (ร้านซื้อขายความทรงจำ)	Krist Perawat Sangpotirat	GMMTV Records	
2023	"Sang-Gu" (สั่งกู)	Jaylerr feat. F.HERO; TangBadVoice	Official Channel	
2023	"Turn Back Time"	Zack Tabudlo ft. Violette Wautier	Official Channel	
2024	"Harley"	Pokmindset & Jigsaw Story	Mindset Mob	

== Live sessions and official cover versions ==
Year	Title	Artist	Channel	Ref.
2018	Song After Six	Bright Vachirawit	GMM 25	
2020	Phawana	Bright Vachirawit	GMMTV	
2022	At My Worst	Ally Achiraya x Bright	Workpoint Official	
2022	Ruang Bon Tieng (เรื่องบนเตียง)	Ken Theeradej Wongpuapan x Bright	Workpoint Official	
2022	Best Wishes (บานปลาย)	Bowkylion x Bright	Whattheduck	
2022	Unmovable (Move ไปไหน)	Bowkylion x Bright	GMMTV Records	
2023	B Blood Type (เลือดกรุ๊ปบี)	Davika Hoorne x Bright	Workpoint Official	
2024	At My Worst	Ally Achiraya X Pink Sweat$ X Bright	Allyonly Official Site	

== Shooting Star Asia tour ==
Owing to the F4 Thailand international popularity, musical concerts "Shooting Star" was held across South-East Asian countries and Bright had a successful stint.

No.	Date	Venue	Location	Ref.
1	23 July 2022	Union Hall, Union Mall	Bangkok Thailand	
2	15 October 2022	The Kasablanka Hall	Jakarta Indonesia	
3	5 November 2022	Tropicana Gardens Mall Convention Center	Kuala Lumpur Malaysia	
4	19 November 2022	World Trade Centre Metro Manila	Manila Philippines	
5	5 February 2023	Taipei International Convention Center	Taipei Taiwan	
6	18 February 2023	Asia World Summit	Hong Kong	
7	4 March 2023	Military Zone 7 Indoor Sports Complex	Hi Chi Minh City Vietnam	
8	11 March 2023	The Star Theatre	Singapore	
9	18-19 March 2023	Pia Arena MM	Yokohama Japan	
10	2 April 2023	Yes24 Live Hall	Seoul South Korea	
11	7 October 2023	Union Mall	Bangkok Thailand	

== Side By Side concert ==
No.	Date	Venue	Location	Ref.
1	24 December 2022	Impact Arena, Muang Thong Thani	Bangkok Thailand	
2	17–18 June 2023	Pia Arena MM	Yokohama Japan	
3	8 July 2023	AsiaWorld–Expo	Hong Kong	
4	29 September 2023	Taoyuan Arena	Taipei Taiwan	
5	12 November 2023	Koh Pich Theatre	Phnom Penh Cambodia	

== Musical awards ==
Won	8
Nominated	20

*Few private voting based recognitions are not mentioned here.

Year	Award	Category	Work	Result	Ref.
2021	Fever Awards 2020	Best Drama-Series Song Fever Award	Kan Goo (คั่นกู); Ost. 2gether: The Series	Won	
2021	Sanook Awards 2020	Thai Song Of The Year	Yang Khu Kan (ยังคู่กัน); Ost. Still 2gether	Won	
2021	JOOX Thailand Music Awards 2021	Song of The Year	Kan Goo (คั่นกู); Ost. 2gether: The Series	Nominated	
2021	JOOX Thailand Music Awards 2021	New Artist of The Year		Nominated	
2021	JOOX Thailand Music Awards 2021	Top Social Artist of The Year		Nominated	
2021	Line TV Awards 2021	LINETV Best Thai Song	Kan Goo (คั่นกู); Ost. 2gether: The Series	Nominated	
2021	12th Nataraja Awards	Best Drama Song Award	Kan Goo (คั่นกู); Ost. 2gether: The Series	Won	
2021	True ID Music Awards 2021	Best Singer of the Year		Nominated	
2021	T-POP Stage Awards	Music of the week	Sad Movie with Nattawut Srimhok	Won	
2021	Maya Awards 2021	Popular Drama Soundtrack	Yang Khu Kan (ยังคู่กัน); Ost. Still 2gether	Nominated	
2021	T-POP of the Year Awards 2021	Best Rookie	"Unmovable" (Move ไปไหน)	Nominated	
2022	JOOX Thailand Music Awards 2022	Top Social Thai Artist of the year		Nominated	
2022	JOOX Thailand Music Awards 2022	Collaboration Song of the Year	Sad Movie with Nattawut Srimhok	Nominated	
2022	Content Asia Awards	Best Original Song: For Movie or An Asian TV Program	Night Time; Ost. F4 Thailand	Nominated	
2022	Content Asia Awards	Best Original Song: For Movie or An Asian TV Program	One Hug; Ost. 2gether: The Movie	Nominated	
2022	Content Asia Awards	Best Original Song: For Movie or An Asian TV Program	Who Am I Ost. F4 Thailand	Nominated	
2022	The 27th Asian Television Awards (ATA)	Best Theme Song	Who Am I Ost. F4 Thailand	Nominated	
2022	Asian Academy Creative Awards (AAA) 2022	Best Theme Song or Title Theme: National Winners	Who Am I Ost. F4 Thailand	Won	
2022	Asian Academy Creative Awards (AAA) 2022	Best Theme Song or Title Theme: Grand Final Winners	Who Am I Ost. F4 Thailand	Won	
2023	Guitar Mag Awards 2023	Star Single Hit of the Year	Lost & Found	Nominated	
2023	Maya TV Awards 2023	String Artist of the Year	Lost & Found	Nominated	
2023	MTV Europe Music Awards, Paris	Best Asian Act		3rd Place	
2023	MTV Video Music Awards, Japan	Best Asian Celebrity		Won	
2023	33rd Seoul Music Awards	Popular Thai Star Award		2nd Place	
2023	Central World Music Community Award 2023	Artist Of The Year	I Think of You	Nominated	
2024	The Guitar Mag Awards 2024	Popular Vote 2024		Nominated	
2024	The Guitar Mag Awards 2024	Star's Single Hits of The Year 2024		2nd Place	
2025	Indonesian Television Awards	Special Award	"Long Shower"	Won	
