= Bright Vachirawit =

Thai actor, singer and entrepreneur (born 1997)

Vachirawit Chivaaree
- วชิรวิชญ์ ชีวอารี
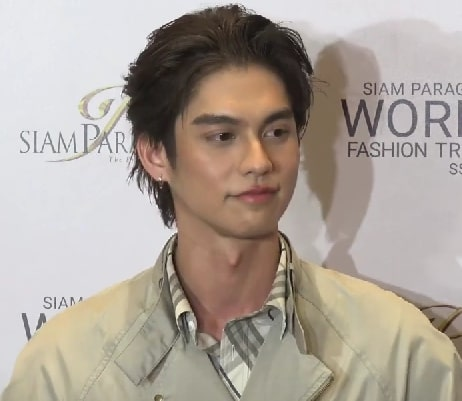
- Vachirawit in 2025
- Born: Kunlatorn Chivaaree; 27 December 1997 (age 28); Nakhon Pathom, Thailand
- Other name: Bright
- Education: Bangkok University
- Occupations: Actor; Singer; Entrepreneur; Host
- Years active: 2013–present
- Agents: GMMTV (2018–2023); Cloud9 Entertainment (2023–present)
- Notable work: Discography; Sarawat in 2gether: The Series; Thyme in F4 Thailand: Boys Over Flowers; Kimhan in Astrophile; Bo in Love You To Debt
- Height: 183 cm (6 ft 0 in)
- Honours: Nataraja Awards; Asia Artist Awards; Mani Mekhala Awards; MTV VMA; Tatler Ball Awards; GQ: Men of the Year
- Musical career
- Genres: R&B; Thai Pop
- Instruments: Vocals; Guitar; Piano
- Years active: 2020–present
- Label: Cloud9 Entertainment

Vachirawit Chivaaree (Thai: วชิรวิชญ์ ชีวอารี, RTGS: Wachirawit Chiwa-ari; born 27 December 1997), also known as Bright Vachirawit (Thai: ไบร์ท) or Bright, is a Thai actor, singer, and entrepreneur. He is known for his role in the 2gether series franchise and F4 Thailand: Boys Over Flowers, for the films Congrats My Ex! and Love You To Debt, for show Toe Laew, for album Adolescent, and for song "Lost & Found". He is the founder of ASTRO Stuffs merchandise and Cloud9 Entertainment agency. He was listed in Forbes 30 Under 30 under Asia Entertainment in 2024.

He has won several awards including Nataraja Award, MTV Awards for singing, and Mani Mekhala Award, Asian Academy Creative Awards, GQ Awards for acting. He is the global ambassador for Burberry, Calvin Klein, a brand ambassador for Adidas and Bangkok Bank visa in Thailand. In 2023, he received the debutant "Golden Cane Award", presented by Kiera Chaplin. In 2024, Bright got selected as member of 'The Business of Fashion 500 Class' (BOF) Paris and Red Sea International Film Festival, Jeddah. In 2025, he was selected in the category of 'Global Icons' at Lifestyle Asia 50 Icons, an event held in Bangkok; and was named among '2025 Asia-Pacific Under 30 Outstanding Young Leaders'.

== Early life ==
Vachirawit was born on 27 December 1997 in Nakhon Chai Si, Nakhon Pathom Province, Thailand, as Kunlatorn Chivaaree; he is of Thai-American-Chinese descent. His parents divorced when he was a child. He grew up in Thailand with his maternal relatives and his cousins. As a child his mother nicknamed him "Bright". In fourth grade, he changed his name from Kunlatorn to Vachirawit. He grew up surrounded by musicians, as his uncle owned a music school. At the age of 10, he started learning several musical instruments.

Vachirawit completed his lower secondary education at Suankularb Wittayalai School, and upper secondary education at Triam Udom Suksa School. During middle school, he was among 700 students chosen from over 10,000 applicants to compete in a Math and Science competition organized by the National Science and Technology Development Agency (NSTDA) and Diamond Crown, an Academic Excellence Program. He served as an academic representative and secured 4th place in a national crossword competition. He worked as a part-timer for small roles in the entertainment industry through this he was able to pay for his own schooling.

Vachirawit initially received a scholarship for the Thammasat English Program of Engineering (TEPE) under the Faculty of Engineering of Thammasat University, but took break for a year to focus on his career. Later, he decided to pursue marketing at Bangkok University International College. This program also presented him with a full scholarship. In 2021, he completed his Bachelor of Business Administration (BBA) in Marketing.

=== Business ventures ===
- Astro Stuffs

Vachirawit launched his first merchandise under the brand name ASTRO Stuffs, in late May 2020. In September 2021, he reimaged the brand which promoted sustainable fashion, use of recycled plastic and philanthropy.

In 2023, Vachirawit's brand ASTRO Stuffs: We Make Good Stuff Company Limited, listed in Better Cotton Initiative (BCI), a non-profit organisation, that contributes towards the United Nations goals to achieve better water sustainability and sustainable agriculture.

- Cloud9 Entertainment

In September 2023, Vachirawit established Cloud9 Entertainment, an artist management agency, and partnered with Universal Music Thailand to provide Thai talents a global platform. Allbright is his official fandom account.

=== Personal life ===
Vachirawit's interests include reading, Muay Thai, boxing, and football. He is a member of Monday Knights Football Club. He owns a bicolor ragdoll cat named Ame. He enjoys photography, and shares his work via his Instagram account, "isawitbefore". He covers music on his Instagram as well. Some of these songs have been acknowledged by the original singers.

== Acting career ==
=== 2013–2019: Beginnings ===
In 2013, at the age of 15, Vachirawit debuted as a variety show host in the 6th generation of Strawberry Krub Cake (SKC) on Channel 3 and his acting debut in SKC's short series The Beginning: Run Lovers Run produced by Duang Malee Maneejan and Nadao Bangkok. He was featured in small roles within the industry which includes TV dramas, music videos and a film. His notable roles were in Social Death Vote as "Day" and in I Sea U as "Peter".

In 2018, Vachirawit auditioned for New Face Project by GMMTV and was signed as an actor/artist. In 2019, he was cast for the role of "young Dr. Peng" in Nadao Bangkok's My Ambulance. He became one of the hosts of GMM 25's travel based show Toe Laew, joining the show in its first season from Episode 135, and he reprised his role in the second season in 2020.

=== 2020–2023: Rising popularity ===
In 2020, Vachirawit earned his breakthrough when he played "Sarawat", his first lead role, in 2gether: The Series. The series became most viewed show on Line TV. He reprised his role in Still 2gether the sequel, and in 2gether: The Movie, which premiered in Tokyo. In June 2021, Japanese director Shusuke Kaneko praised his acting.

In 2021, Vachirawit's played the lead role of "Thyme" (Domyoji Tsukasa), in F4 Thailand: Boys Over Flowers, a Thai adaptation of the Japanese manga Hana Yori Dango by Yoko Kamio, who appreciated his screen presence. He was selected for the role in 2019, however further casting and the shooting were delayed due to the COVID-19 pandemic. It finally aired in December 2021 and was well received.

In 2022, Vachirawit starred in the romantic series Astrophile, which received positive reviews. His guest role as an antagonistic "Moth" in the fantasy series Midnight Museum gained highest viewership. In 2023, he starred in Thai-Indian film Congrats My Ex!, a romantic comedy around Indian wedding, which ranked in Top 5 romcom in Prime Video.

In 2023, his GMMTV contract ended and he became independent artist under his own agency, Cloud9 Entertainment.

=== 2024–present ===
In 2024, Vachirawit's film Love You to Debt, a Thai adaptation of Man in Love, got released on Netflix and was presented on 'Thai Movie Day' in Paris at Champs-Élysées. His movie Congrats My Ex! was promoted at Cannes Film Festival.

== Musical career ==
Vachirawit appeared in various music videos during the early years of his career. In 2020, his first OPM song cover "With A Smile" was released for Still 2gether Philippines version. In 2021, he became youngest male artist to receive the "Best Song Drama" in 12th Nataraja Awards for his song "Kan Goo". His first Thai single "Unmovable" from the Boys Don't Cry album, which won "Rookie of the Week" in T-pop Stage Award.

In 2022, Vachirawit released his first English single "Lost & Found". His song "Good Times", with Kanyawee Songmuang, got positive reviews. In 2023, Singaporean PM Lee Hsien Loong used the song for political video promotion during his visit in Thailand. In 2023, he released his single "My Ecstasy" Feat D. Gerrard from his mini album Adolescent as a creative director under the label RISER Music. This song was top requested song on HITZ 955, Thailand.

In 2024, Vachirawit participated in Summer Sonic Festival and Home Party event in Thailand, Japan and Indonesia. His singles "Long Run" and "Sleeping Pills" along with Thai songwriter Thammathai Phalangsilp (Timethai), received positive reception. He also performed at NHK Expo event. He debuted at 88rising with his single "Long Showers". He surpassed 100M streams across all his credits on Spotify, and his YouTube gained 'Musical Note Badge', an Official Artist Channel (OAC).

On 19 June 2025, Vachirawit's artistry featured in Burberry's music festival campaign launched in Bangkok, which showcased the synergy of their contemporary and distinctive style.

== Influences ==
=== Ambassadorships ===
Vachirawit's is the brand ambassador for many international and local brands like Adidas, Samsung Galaxy A53 5G, Bangkok Bank, Korea based Bonchon Chicken, Japan based cat food Nekko, Lay's Max Chips, Ichitan, Indonesia based skincare WhiteStory, and Globe Telecom from the Philippines. He is the friend of Kiehl's Thailand, Malaysia and Singapore, and of Vespa Thailand.

In July 2022, Burberry unveiled Vachirawit as its first global brand ambassador from the South Asia-Pacific region. Since 2020, he has been working for British luxury brand Burberry. He had a photography collaboration on "Lola Bags". In London, his front-row debut at SS23 collection by Italian fashion designer Riccardo Tisci, garnered $2M EMV based on WWD report. In 2023, he attended Daniel Lee's debut Burberry AW23 collection.

In 2022, Vachirawit as the brand ambassador of Adidas, attended an event with the Manchester United Players. According to Launchmetrics, he contributed $7.1M Media Impact Value (MIV), making him one of "The Most Impactful Sportwear Influencers". He featured in Adidas originals new brand logo launch campaign.

In 2023, Vachirawit became first Thai male artist to debut for Calvin Klein as its brand ambassador for Asia. He featured for CK's in Elle Men magazine and attended brand events in Tokyo, Japan.

In 2024, Vachirawit made history by becoming the first Thai artist to attended Met Gala at New York and was top ranked for Burberry contributing $7.5M EMV. Calvin Klein's new global campaign "Bright" is named after him.

"Bright is a talented performer who works extremely hard, possesses confidence and has an innate charisma" – Daniel Lee, British Designer, Vogue 2024

=== Endorsements ===
Vachirawit previous notable collaborations were with Gucci, Prada, Bulgari, Fendi, Louis Vuitton, Tiffany & Co., Yves Saint Laurent, Versace, Dior, Loewe, Chanel, Bottega Veneta, Givenchy, Gentle Monster, Balenciaga and Armani.

In 2022, Vachirawit generated most of Gucci's Earned Media Value (EMV). In Milan Fashion Week FW22 for Prada, he has generated $934K in MIV. Launchmetrics' Chief Marketing Officer, Alison Bringé recognized him as prominent Asian celebrities. He did endorsements for the Philippines based Oxecure, SparSha, All Café in the 7-Eleven store, Lazada, Isuzu Motors, Scotch, and others.

In 2023, Vachirawit featured as "First Solo Frontman" in Elle Men Magazine and GQ cover sponsored by Bulgari, did exclusive cover shoot for "Octo Roma Watch", and was star guest in Bulgari's pop-up event on "Iconic Serpenti Jewellery". He attended launch of French luxury brand Yves Saint Laurent (YSL) "Libre" pop-up event at Ion Orchard, Singapore. He is a regular invitee at Marvel Studio movie launch in Thailand.

In 2025, Vachirawit attended the AMI Paris Spring Summer 2026 show as a special guest of the brand, featuring a collection designed by Alexandre Mattiussi. He attended the Audemars Piguet and KAWS collaboration event in Switzerland.

=== Fashion ===
Vachirawit gets featured regularly on Vogue, GQ, Harper's Bazaar, Elle, L'Officiel Hommes, Cosmopolitan, Esquire, Madame Figaro, Dazed, Grazia, Marie Claire, The Guitar, Menifesto, Metro Society, Folio, The Mint, Spur and other elite national and international magazines. In 2023, he became the first male artist based in Thailand, to feature on covers of Vogue Thailand and Hong Kong.

=== Philanthropy ===
Vachirawit advocates on charitable activities like forest conservation, marine life, including mental health through a joint initiative with UNICEF, Sustainability in fashion business, and 'Praew Charity Project' to help heart disease patients. His merchandise sale proceeds went to the Seub Nakhasathien Foundation to support conservation of wildlife in Thailand. He initiated 'One Tree Planted' to empowered farmers and 'Right To Play - Protect. Educate. Empower' for the underprivileged kids. During the COVID-19 pandemic, he donates supplies to those in need in Khlong Toei district.

Since 2020, Vachirawit collaborated in raising money to help extinguish the forest fires in Chiang Mai province. He supported firefighters' project, during fire outbreak in the King Kaew factory. The contributions were made towards purchase of firefighter's suits and equipment for the volunteers, as they lack equipped logistics to perform risky tasks.

In 2022, he and his fans organized an auction, which collected $75K for charity. He donated medical supplies during COVID-19 pandemic, to Elephant and Wildlife Research Center, Chiang Mai University and Thai Elephant Conservation Center Fund. He spread awareness on Mental Health with initiative 'You Are Not Alone In The Universe', to reduce stigma around it. He speaks on socio-political topics like voting. He advocated on Earth Day and healthy planet and initiated 'Love Clean Air', that promoted travel by public transport to reduce traffic related air pollution.

=== Media image ===
Vachirawit has been listed in the "Top 50 Influential" by Vogue and by HOWE Magazine for his contributions in various fields. His public image has earned him titles of 'Walking Louvre Museum', 'Thailand's National Treasure', 'Thai Supernova', 'National Husband', 'Godfather of Presenters', 'King of Commercials' and many more.

Within Thai industry, Vachirawit is the first celebrity to have his own "Twitter Topic". In 2021, he became highest earning male celebrity with ฿109M from brand endorsements on his Instagram. He featured in "Top 100 Most Searched Asian on Google Worldwide" in 2022. In 2023, Nielsen Thailand with a campaign value ฿56M, he was the top presenter for Lazada. He featured in "Global Influencers" who has created highest EMV (Earned Media Value) during "Fashion Week 2023".

Vachirawit features frequently in "Top 20 Most Attractive Asian Celebs" alongside other eminent artists. He ranked 7th in "Most Handsome and Beautiful in the World", 5th in "The Global Face & Style Icon", 2nd in "l Magazine Fashion Face", 8th in "Top Men in Fashion World", 1st in "Attractive Thai Actors", and 1st in "The Most Tweeted Thai Artists 2020".

With 46% netizens votes, he ranked 1st in "Asian Drama Actor of the Year 2020". In 2023, Vachirawit was featured in Times Square, New York as "Top 20 Most Powerful Asian Celebrity". He was ranked 1st in "Most Handsome Face" as per "Korean Plastic Surgeons Survey". He features in "Most Handsome Man Alive" regularly. In 2024, he featured in Top 5 'Most Handsome Man In The World'. In 2025, he made it to the Madame Tussauds Hot 100 list, recognizing his prominence in fashion.

== Filmography ==
=== Films ===
Year	Title	Role	Notes	Ref.
2016	Love Say Hey	Tae	Main role	
2018	0.9 Kilometers to Mile	Short film	Main role	
2021	2gether: The Movie	Sarawat Guntithanon	Lead role	
2023	Congrats My Ex!	Tim	Lead role	
2024	Love You To Debt	Bo	Lead role	

=== Television ===
Year	Title	Role	Notes	Ref.
2013	The Beginning: Story 2: Ep 3: Run Lovers Run	Bright	Main role	
2014	Karma	Tao	Bit Part	
2017	Roop Thong; Ep:6	Ekkarat	Bit Part	
2018	I Sea U	Peter/Peyton	Main role	
2018	Love Songs Love Series: Rao Lae Nai	Bright	Main role	
2018	Social Death Vote; Ep:4-6	Day	Supporting role	
2018	Love Songs Love Series: Ja Ruk Reu Ja Rai	Ter	Main role	
2018	Love Songs Love Series: Gor Koey Sunya	Ken	Supporting role	
2018	Yuttakarn Prab Nang Marne; Ep:8	Tuanote	Bit Part	
2019	Heha Mia Navy	Seaman Bright	Bit Part	
2019	Korn Aroon Ja Roong: Ep.14 Onwards	Anotai (Adult)	Supporting role	
2019	My Ambulance; Ep:1,3	Peng (Young)	Guest role	
2020	2gether: The Series	Sarawat Guntithanon	Lead role	
2020	Still 2gether	Sarawat Guntithanon	Lead role	
2021	In Time with You: Thueng Ham Jai Kor Ja Rak	Nick	Supporting role	
2021	F4 Thailand: Boys Over Flowers	"Thyme" Akira Paramaanantra	Lead role	
2022	Astrophile	Kimhan	Lead role	
2022	Good Old Days: Story 4: Our Soundtrack; Ep:8,9	Tong	Lead role	
2023	Midnight Museum: Ep.3	Moth	Guest role	
2023	Enigma: Ep.4/4	Tul	Guest role	
TBA	Feng Yun: The Storm Riders	Nie Feng	Main role	

=== Variety shows ===
Year	Title	Channel	Notes	Ref.
2013	Strawberry Krubcake	Channel 3	Main host	
2019	Toe Laew S1: Ep.135 Onwards	GMM 25	Main host	
2021	Play 2gether	GMMTV	Main host	
2021	Bright & Win Inbox	GMMTV	Main host	
2021	The Ruanguru: Indonesian Show with Tiara Andini	Ruangguru Bimbel Online	Guest	
2021	Toe Laew S2	GMMTV	Main host	
2021	CP Sausage No.1 Live Show: BamBam x Bright	CP Brand	Participant	
2022	The Wall Song: Ep.77	Workpoint Official	Participant	
2022	Isuzu Max Challenge	GMMTV	Main Host	
2022	The Wall Song: Ep.107	Workpoint Official	Participant	
2023	Ploy and Bell: Ep.23	Official Channel	Guest	
2023	Sound Check: Ep.21	One 31 Official	Guest	
2023	The Wall Song: Ep.138	Workpoint Official	Participant	

== Discography ==
The discography of Bright consists of his elaborated music career, his singles, OST of many series, live concerts within Thailand and across South-East Asia countries, his music video appearances for other singers and few collaborations.

Title	Counts
Singles	9
Studio	8
Concerts	63
OST	9
Music Video appearance	19
Collab/ Promotional songs	7

== Awards and recognition ==
=== Awards and nominations ===
Won	36
Nominated	46

*Few private voting based recognitions are not mentioned here.

Year	Award	Category	Work	Result	Ref.
2020	Maya Awards	Best Couple	2gether: The Series	Nominated	
2020	Kazz Awards	Kazz Magazine's Favorite	2gether: The Series	Won	
2020	Line Thailand People's Choice Awards	Best Couple	2gether: The Series	Won	
2020	Thairath Best of 2020	Best Couple	2gether: The Series	Won	
2021	Fever Awards 2020	Best Drama-Series Song Fever Award	"Kan Goo"	Won	
2021	Thailand Zocial Awards 2021	Person of the Year - Couple of the Year	2gether: The Series	Won	
2021	Sanook Awards 2020	Best Couple	2gether: The Series	Won	
2021	Sanook Awards 2020	Thai Song of the Year	"Yang Khu Kan"	Won	
2021	JOOX Thailand Music Awards 2021	Song of the Year	"Kan Goo"	Nominated	
2021	JOOX Thailand Music Awards 2021	New Artist of the Year		Nominated	
2021	JOOX Thailand Music Awards 2021	Top Social Artist of the Year		Nominated	
2021	Line TV Awards 2021	LINETV Best Thai Song	"Kan Goo"	Nominated	
2021	Line TV Awards 2021	LINETV Best Kiss Scene	2gether: The Series	Nominated	
2021	12th Nataraja Awards	Best Drama Song Award	"Kan Goo"	Won	
2021	12th Nataraja Awards	Best Cast Ensemble	2gether: The Series	Nominated	
2021	Kazz Awards 2021	Attractive Young Man of the Year	Still 2gether	Won	
2021	Kazz Awards 2021	Imaginary Couple of the Year	Still 2gether	Won	
2021	Kazz Awards 2021	Best Actor	Still 2gether	Won	
2021	Kazz Awards 2021	Best Scene	Still 2gether	Won	
2021	Asia Artist Awards 2021	Asia Celebrity Award for Actor		Won	
2021	True ID Music Awards 2021	Best Singer of the Year		Nominated	
2021	T-POP Stage Awards	Music of the week	"Sad Movie" with Nattawut Srimhok	Won	
2021	Maya Awards 2021	Charming Boy		Nominated	
2021	Maya Awards 2021	Best Couple		Nominated	
2021	Maya Awards 2021	Popular Drama Soundtrack	"Yang Khu Kan" Still 2gether	Nominated	
2021	Maya Awards 2021	Male Rising Star		Nominated	
2021	Thairath Best of 2021	Couple of the Year	Still 2gether	Won	
2021	Thailand Actors Award 2021: Japan	Best Couple	2gether: The Movie	Won	
2021	Thailand Actors Award 2021: Japan	Best Actor	2gether: The Movie	Won	
2021	T-POP of the Year Awards 2021	Best Rookie	"Unmovable"	2nd Place	
2022	JOOX Thailand Music Awards 2022	Top Social Thai Artist of the year		Nominated	
2022	JOOX Thailand Music Awards 2022	Collaboration Song of the Year	"Sad Movie" with Nattawut Srimhok	Nominated	
2022	Thailand Zocial Award 2022	Best Entertainment Performance on Social Media: Actor Category	F4 Thailand Astrophile	Won	
2022	Maya Entertain Awards	Charming Boy	F4 Thailand	Nominated	
2022	Maya Entertain Awards	Best Couple	F4 Thailand	Nominated	
2022	Maya Entertain Awards	Popular Male Star	F4 Thailand	Nominated	
2022	SiamRath Online Award 2022	Popular Male Star	F4 Thailand	Won	
2022	Kazz Awards 2022	Popular Male Teenager	F4 Thailand	Won	
2022	Kazz Awards 2022	Best Scene (shared with Tontawan Tantivejakul)	F4 Thailand	Nominated	
2022	The 3rd Mani Mekhala Awards (2022)	ดาราชายมหานิยมมหาชน (The Most Public Popular Male Celebrity Award)	F4 Thailand	Won	
2022	The 3rd Mani Mekhala Awards (2022)	ซุปเปอร์สตาร์เจ้าเสน่ห์ (Charismatic Superstar Award)	F4 Thailand	Won	
2022	Content Asia Awards	Best Original Song: For Movie or An Asian TV Program	"Night Time" F4 Thailand	Nominated	
2022	Content Asia Awards	Best Original Song: For Movie or An Asian TV Program	"One Hug"2gether: The Movie	Nominated	
2022	Content Asia Awards	Best Original Song: For Movie or An Asian TV Program	"Who Am I" F4 Thailand	Nominated	
2022	The 27th Asian Television Awards (ATA)	Best Theme Song	"Who Am I" F4 Thailand	Nominated	
2022	Asian Academy Creative Awards (AAA) 2022	Best Theme Song or Title Theme: National Winners	"Who Am I" (Ost. F4 Thailand)	Won	
2022	Asian Academy Creative Awards (AAA) 2022	Best Theme Song or Title Theme: Grand Final Winners	"Who Am I" (Ost. F4 Thailand)	Won	
2022	GQ Men of the Year Awards 2022: MOTY	Actor of the Year	F4 Thailand	Won	
2023	Sanook Awards 2022	Actor of the Year	F4 Thailand Astrophile	Nominated	
2023	Daradaily Awards 2022	Star of the Year		Won	
2023	Komchadluek Awards 2022	Most Popular Actor	Astrophile	Won	
2023	Guitar Mag Awards 2023	Star Single Hit of the Year	"Lost & Found"	2nd Place	
2023	KAZZ Awards 2023	Men's Superstar Award	Astrophile	Won	
2023	KAZZ Awards 2023	Best Actor Award	Astrophile	Nominated	
2023	Maya TV Awards 2023	Best Male Star of the Year	Astrophile	Nominated	
2023	Maya TV Awards 2023	Charming Young Man of the Year	Astrophile	Nominated	
2023	Maya TV Awards 2023	String Artist of the Year	"Lost & Found"	2nd Place	
2023	Nine Entertainment Award 2023	Special Award: Most Engagement on Instagram		Won	
2023	Seoul International Drama Awards	Outstanding Asian Star	Astrophile	2nd Place	
2023	HOWE Awards 2023	Popular Vote		Nominated	
2023	14th Nataraja Awards	Best Cast Ensemble	F4 Thailand	Nominated	
2023	MTV Europe Music Awards, Paris	Best Asian Act		3rd Place	
2023	MTV Video Music Awards, Japan	Best Asian Celebrity		Won	
2023	GQ Men of the Year Awards 2023	Thailand's Global Star		Won	
2023	33rd Seoul Music Awards	Popular Thai Star Award		2nd Place	
2023	Tatler Ball Awards 2023	Chaplin Golden Cane Award		Won	
2023	GQ Japan: Men of the Year Awards 2023	Best Asian Entertainer		Won	
2023	Central World Music Community Award 2023	Artist of the Year	"I Think of You"	Nominated	
2024	The Guitar Mag Awards 2024	Popular Vote 2024		Nominated	
2024	The Guitar Mag Awards 2024	Star's Single Hits of the Year 2024		2nd Place	
2024	Kazz Awards 2024	Popular Male Artist Award		Won	
2024	Kazz Awards 2024	Popular Vote		Nominated	
2024	Komchadluek Awards 2023	Popular Male Actor		Nominated	
2024	Komchadluek Awards 2023	Thai International Singer		Nominated	
2024	Komchadluek Awards 2023	Popular Couple(shared with Ranee Campen)	Congrats My Ex!	Nominated	
2024	Maya TV Awards	Popular Vote		Nominated	
2024	Asian Academy Creative Awards 2024; National Winner Thailand	Best Leading Actor	Congrats My Ex!	Won	
2025	Komchadluek Awards	Popular Male Actor	Love You To Debt	Nominated	
2025	Thailand BOX Office Awards	Actor of the Year: Movie	Love You To Debt	Nominated	
2025	StarFocus Awards	Top Artist		Nominated	
2025	Indonesian Television Awards	Special Award	"Long Shower"	Won	

=== Other recognitions ===
Year	Award	Category	Work	Result	Ref.
2020	Korean Updates Awards	Asian Artist of the Year		Won	
2020	Asian Culture Awards (The Republic of Peru)	Best Thai Artist		Won	
2020	VoicePoints Social Media Awards	Phenomenal Foreign BL Couple of the Year	2gether: The Series	Won	
2021	Central BL Awards 2021: Mexico	Best Couple	2gether: The Series	Won	
2021	Central BL Awards 2021: Mexico	Mister BL	2gether: The Series	Won	
2021	Central BL Awards 2021: Mexico	Best Seme/ Actor	2gether: The Series	Won	
2023	Thai Update 2023	Certificate of Appreciation: Most Popular Thai Actor		Won	
2024	Halo Ocean Awards 2024	Most Popular Asian Artist		Top Male	

=== Listicles ===
Year	Title	Listicle	Placement	Ref.
2025	Asia-Pacific Entrepreneurs Association (APEA)	Asia-Pacific U30 Outstanding Young Leaders	Listed	

== See also ==
- Bright Vachirawit Chivaaree discography
- Lost & Found (Bright Vachirawit Chivaaree song)
- ASTRO Stuffs
