= Win Metawin =

Thai actor (born 1999)

- เมธวิน โอภาสเอี่ยมขจร
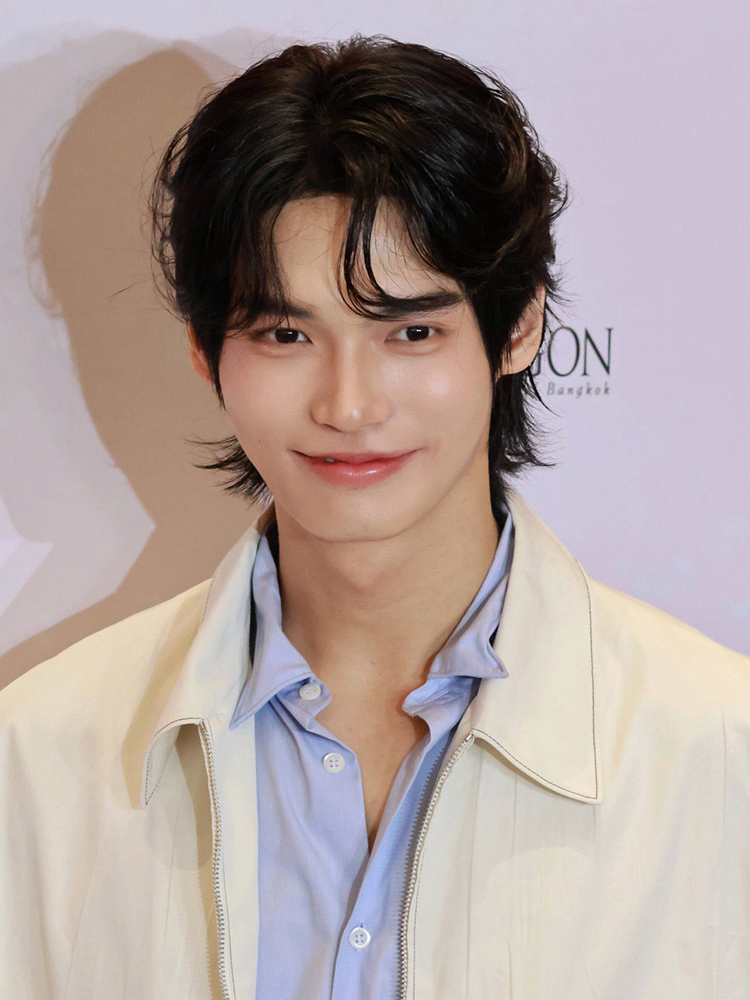
- Metawin in 2025
- Born: Metawin Opas-iamkajorn; 21 February 1999 (age 27); Bangkok, Thailand
- Other names: Win Metawin; 林汉洲
- Education: Thammasat University
- Occupations: Actor; Entrepreneur
- Years active: 2020–present
- Agents: GMMTV; Riser Music
- Notable work: Tine in 2gether; Kavin in F4 Thailand: Boys Over Flowers
- Height: 185 cm (6 ft 1 in)
- Relatives: Metas Opas-iamkajorn (younger brother)
- Website: GMMTV Artists

Metawin Opas-iamkajorn (Thai: เมธวิน โอภาสเอี่ยมขจร; born 21 February 1999), widely known as Win Metawin (Thai: วิน เมธวิน), is a Thai actor and entrepreneur. He rose to prominence in 2020 with his acting debut in Thai drama 2gether and gained further recognition with his role in F4 Thailand: Boys Over Flowers. In addition to his work in entertainment, Metawin is a brand ambassador for luxury brands Prada and Tiffany & Co. and was named to the Forbes 30 Under 30 Asia class of 2023.

== Personal life ==
=== Family and education ===
Metawin was born in Bangkok, Thailand, and is the third of four siblings. He has two older sisters, Mintra and Mesa, and a younger brother, Metas.

He started his studies at Denla British School (DBS), and went to Assumption College, a private Catholic boys school in Bangkok for his primary education. He had a brief summer course at Assumption College Bangrak. He then went to Panyarat High School for secondary education.

In 2014, he joined an English summer program in the UK. In March and April 2015, he participated in a 42-day summer program in Taiwan to study Mandarin.

He studied as an exchange student at Belmond–Klemme Community School District in Iowa, USA for a year, and passed the General Education Development (GED) exam in 11th grade.

After returning to Thailand, Metawin skipped the 12th grade and enrolled in the faculty of economics international program at Thammasat University. He graduated in 2020, with his graduation ceremony delayed until 27 May 2022, due to the COVID-19 pandemic.

During his time as an exchange student Metawin actively participated in his school's extracurricular activities, he became a member of the school band's percussion choir where his group received a superior (Division I) rating. He played American football and was part of his high school's soccer team.

He used to play golf competitively during his childhood and won several tournaments but had to quit due to injury. He still continue playing golf recreationally.

He is fluent in Thai and English and can hold a basic conversation in Mandarin.

His family owns a Chihuahua named Charlotte and two Shetland Sheepdogs, Bentley and Cartier. In July 2024, Bentley died due to lymphoma. Following this, Metawin participated in a fundraiser with Professor Dr. Thanin Intarakamthornchai, President of the Lymphoma Society of Thailand, at an event aimed at raising awareness about lymphoma and support initiatives for those affected by the disease.

=== Business ventures ===
Win Metawin began his first business venture at the age of 18 while enrolled as a freshman in the International Economics program at Thammasat University. He launched an event organizing business, starting with the coordination of a small concert. His responsibilities encompassed overseeing logistics, event planning, vendor coordination, and operational management.

In June 2020, during his fourth year of university and at the start of his career in the entertainment industry, Metawin launched his fashion brand, Velence, sold primarily through an online platform. The brand serves both domestic and international markets, with exports to 15-16 countries. It offers a range of products, including clothing, accessories, hats, bags, and more.

In the same year, Metawin co-founded Souri, a confectionery business, with his sister Mintra Opas-iamkajorn, a Le Cordon Bleu graduate with an MSc (Master of Science) in food quality and innovation from the University of Leeds. On 9 September 2021, he launched Velato, a premium ice cream brand. The brand later merged, with the product now being sold in Souri stores as the brand begun opening several physical locations across Bangkok. Before the end of 2024, Souri had over 150 employees and offered 120-130 types of products. Metawin revealed that sales of macarons alone had surpassed 200,000 pieces per month, with prices ranging from 90 to 120 baht per piece. This translates to an estimated 25 million baht in sales per month, or approximately 300 million baht annually. SOURI won "The Best Celebrity Merchant of the Year" at the Grab Thumbs Up Awards 2024 and in the same year, Metawin, as the co-founder, received the "New Generation Award" at the HOWE Awards 2024 in recognition of his entrepreneurial achievements.

As of 12 September 2024, Metawin holds shares in seven companies. Besides his investments, he also serves as a director in nine companies.

In December 2024, he launched another dessert shop, Cosie, with chiffon cake as its primary product, which he developed with his sister, Mesa Opas-iamkajorn.

As of 12 March 2025, Metawin is one of the major shareholders of The One Enterprise Public Company Limited (ONEE), a leading media and entertainment company in Thailand. Its business spans across advertising, copyrights and licensing, radio, artist management, concert and event organization, merchandising, production services, and studio rentals. ONEE is the parent company of several well-known subsidiaries, This includes GMMTV, the agency Metawin is currently signed with, GMM25, GMMTV Shop, GMM Media, ONE31, ONE D, and many more.

He won the "Outstanding New Generation Entrepreneur" award at the Grab Thumbs Up Awards 2025, held on March 26, 2025.

=== Humanitarian works ===
In July 2020, Metawin participated in The Sound of Happiness campaign, an initiative organized by UNICEF Thailand in collaboration with the Department of Mental Health and JOOX. The campaign aimed to promote mental health awareness among young people in Thailand. Metawin was one of twelve public figures who volunteered to share personal stories about their emotional challenges and experiences with stress during adolescence, encouraging youth to prioritize mental well-being and seek help when needed.

In early 2024, Metawin Opas-iamkajorn took part in the Humans Against Dengue campaign, a regional initiative promoting dengue prevention across Southeast Asia. He appeared in public service announcements encouraging communities to adopt proactive health measures, including early diagnosis, vector control, and vaccination. The campaign was part of a broader effort under the United Against Dengue coalition, launched by IFRC Asia Pacific in collaboration with Takeda Pharmaceutical Company and various public health agencies. Under the slogan "The Less You Know About Dengue, The More Protection You Need," Metawin was featured as one of the campaign’s “Dengue Heroes,” using his public platform to raise awareness and support dengue prevention efforts across the region.

In September 2024, Metawin participated in the tenth edition of the Miracle Is All Around seminar, also known as Miracle X, organized by the Lymphoma Society of Thailand to mark World Lymphoma Day (15 September). Held at Eden Zone, CentralWorld, the event featured expert presentations on innovative lymphoma therapies such as targeted therapy, bispecific antibodies, and CAR‑T cell immunotherapy, offering new treatment hope to patients unable to undergo stem cell transplantation. Metawin joined former lymphoma patients, known as the “X Fighters,” along with artists and healthcare professionals, in motivational activities intended to uplift current patients and reinforce community solidarity in the fight against lymphoma.

In June 2025, Metawin Opas-iamkajorn was appointed as a celebrity supporter for UNHCR Thailand. He participated in the World Refugee Day event held on 20 June in Bangkok, where he helped launch the Hope Away from Home campaign. As part of his role, he appeared in official UNHCR content encouraging public support for displaced people. He stated that his next step would be to visit refugee communities in the field within Thailand, with the aim of helping the public better understand the situation and how they can contribute. His activities with UNHCR include attending advocacy events, promoting refugee rights through media channels, and supporting efforts to raise awareness and resources for humanitarian work.

That same year, Metawin also supported the Thai Red Cross Society’s national blood donation BLOOD CONNECT campaign. He used his platform to promote blood donation, particularly among younger audiences, in response to ongoing national shortages. Through social media and public messaging, he encouraged regular participation in blood donation efforts to help maintain the country's emergency medical supply.

== Career and influence ==
=== 2019—2021: Early career and breakthrough debut ===
Metawin entered the entertainment industry as a trainee actor under ONE31 for a year before signing an actor contract with GMMTV in 2019. He made his acting debut in 2gether, which gained him international recognition. In his first year, Vogue Magazine named him one of the "100 Influential People in the Fashion Industry of Thailand." He was also featured in Howe Magazine's "The 50 Influential People," alongside influencers, businesspeople, and executives recognized for their achievements in various fields.

His popularity and online following have made him a sought-after endorser for local and international brands. He has partnered with major companies such as Shiseido, VIVO, Lazada, CP Brand, Bangkok Bank, AIS (Thailand's largest network provider), and Globe Telecom (a leading telecommunications provider in the Philippines). His endorsements also include other notable brands, underscoring his influence in the industry.

He named his fandom "Snowball Power" on 11 February 2020, via his Twitter account. Fans celebrate the anniversary of the fandom each year on that date.

In September 2020, Metawin was announced as a member of F4 in Thailand's adaptation of the Japanese manga series Hana Yori Dango (Boys Over Flowers), written by Yoko Kamio. The manga has been widely adapted into television dramas and films globally.

Ladybeetle-1 commercial satellite displaying Metawin's picture as the satellite orbited the Earth on 17 February 2021

In February 2021, Metawin became the first Thai artist featured in space advertisements. One of his Chinese fan clubs organized a birthday project displaying his photo via the Ladybeetle-1 commercial satellite as it orbited Earth on 17 February.

He achieved the highest growth in Instagram followers among Thai actors throughout 2021 and the first half of 2022.

At GMMTV's Borderless event in November 2021, it was announced that Metawin would star in his third drama series, Devil Sister, alongside actress Peechaya Wattanamontree.

Metawin is well-known for his proactive approach to acquiring acting training beyond what is offered in production workshops. Notably, he is trained by Rossukon Kongkate, one of Thailand's most prominent acting coaches.

=== 2022—present ===
Metawin regularly appears on the covers of prominent fashion magazines such as GQ, L'Officiel, Elle, Harper's Bazaar, and Vogue, both in Thailand and internationally. He is also featured on the official pages of luxury brands including Louis Vuitton, Valentino, Dior, Gucci, Burberry, Prada, and Moschino. He was among the top contributors to Earned Media Value (EMV) during Milan Fashion Week Autumn-Winter 2022 through his partnerships with Gucci and Dolce & Gabbana. He attended the Louis Vuitton Fall-Winter 2022 Men's Spin-Off Show in Bangkok, generating significant social buzz and digital traffic at the event. According to Launchmetrics, Metawin ranked first as the top voice, post, and influencer during Milan Men's Fashion Week for his appearance in the front row of Prada's Spring-Summer 2023 Runway Show. He generated $4.7 million in Media Impact Value (MIV) across 257 placements, including $1.3 million from a single post.

"He has always been very experienced in matching his own clothes, and has become the darling of different brands" — Simon Au, Vogue Hong Kong

"Despite having debuted only two years ago, Thai actor and model Metawin Opas-iamkajorn has grown to be a global fashion tastemaker" — Amanda Leo, Elle Singapore

Italian luxury fashion brand Prada announced Metawin Opas-iamkajorn as their brand ambassador on 6 January 2023. He reportedly contributed $9.8 million in EMV (Earned Media Value) to the brand in 2022, the highest amount of EMV for a Thailand-based celebrity that year. In a press statement, Prada also announced that Metawin will make an appearance at the Prada fall/winter 2023 men's show in Milan on 15 January 2023. According to data and technology company Launchmetrix, his attendance generated $3.8 million in MIV (Media Impact Value) for the brand.

Metawin was featured in Forbes 30 Under 30 Asia list, which was released on 18 May 2023. The selection process, which evaluated over 4,000 candidates, considered revenue, social impact, scale, inventiveness, and potential. He was the only Thai actor on the list that year.

On 26 July 2023, WISESIGHT (Thailand) Limited, a provider of social media analytics and data analysis tools, conducted a survey of popular hashtags during the first half of the year 2566 (1 January - 30 June 2023) from over 450 significant hashtags across all social media platforms in Thailand. The purpose was to rank the top 10 hashtags with the highest number of engagements. The hashtag #winmetawin came in 8th place with over 55 million engagements.

Coca-Cola named Metawin the first ASEAN brand ambassador for their "A Recipe for Magic" campaign, on 31 July 2023. The campaign spans eight countries, including Thailand, the Philippines, Vietnam, Cambodia, Myanmar, Indonesia, Malaysia, and Singapore.

American luxury jewelry brand Tiffany & Co. appointed Metawin as their House Ambassador on 29 February 2024, making him the first individual from Thailand and Southeast Asia to hold the title.

At the 17th Asian Film Awards held in Hong Kong on 10 March 2024, Metawin received the AFA Rising Star Award. During the event, his debut international film, Under Parallel Skies, directed by Sigrid Andrea Bernardo, premiered as part of the awards' featured program.

German sportswear brand Puma introduced Metawin as their Southeast Asia brand ambassador on 14 March 2024.

After a long-standing partnership, on 20 February 2025, Metawin was appointed as the first Friend of Shiseido in Southeast Asia. With this position, he will showcase Shiseido products across the region throughout the year, and join global events, starting with a launch event in Tokyo.

== Filmography ==
=== Film ===
Year	Title	Role	Notes	Ref.
2021	2gether: The Movie	Tine Teepakorn Aekaranwong	Main role	
2024	Under Parallel Skies	Parin	Main role	

=== Television series ===
Key
†	Denotes television productions that have not yet been released

Year	Title	Role	Notes	Number of episode	Ref.
2018	Wife	Superstar in Gala	Walk-on role	1 (Ep.27)	
2020	2gether	Tine Teepakorn Aekaranwong	Main role	13	
2020	Still 2gether	Tine Teepakorn Aekaranwong	Main role	6	
2021	F4 Thailand: Boys Over Flowers	Kavin Taemiyaklin Kittiyangkul	Main role	16	
2022	Devil Sister	Namcha Chanawee Chaiwat	Main role	18	
2022	Good Old Days	Maew	Main role	3 (Ep.1, 9,10)	
2023	Enigma	Ajin Nakaritta	Main role	4	
2024	Beauty Newbie	Guy Karin Sayapisit	Main role	14	
2025	Break Up Service	Baimai	Guest role	1 (Ep.4)	
2025	Enigma Black Stage	Ajin Nakaritta	Main role	5	
2026	Scarlet Heart Ullavee	Lord Mueang Fah	Main role	18	
TBA	The Jigsoul †	Mes	Main role	TBA	
TBA	High & Low: Born to Be High †	Gavin	TBA	TBA	

=== Variety shows ===
Year	Title	Number of episode	Notes	Ref.
2020	Play2gether	4	Main host	
2020	Bright Win Inbox	9	Main host	
2021	Isuzu Max Challenge	6	Main host	
2022	Isuzu Magic Eyes Challenge	4	Main host	
2023	Isuzu Magic Eyes Challenge: Uncensored	2	Main host	
2024	Peak Trip with Win Mick (Note: Currently ongoing.)	6	Main host	
2025	MAX VOTE ROAD TRIP	1	Main host	

=== Music video appearances ===
Year	Song title	Artist	Ref.
2020	"Tit Gub"	Natthawut Jenmana	
2020	"Kan Goo"	Vachirawit Chiva-aree	
2024	"What I Say Is True"	Violette Wautier	

== Discography ==
=== Singles ===
Year	Song title	Label	Composer	Ref.
2022	"One More Chance"	GMMTV Records	Piyawat Meekruea, Guntapich	
2023	"Vacay" (Feat. F.Hero x Nene)	High Cloud Entertainment	Achariya Dulyapaiboon	
2023	"Too Late"	Riser Music	The Toys	
2024	"Night Ride" (Feat. Badmixy)	Riser Music	Kangsomks, Badmixy	

=== Soundtrack and tie-ins ===
Year	Song title	Notes	Ref.
2020	"Thank You to My Silent Heroes"	Special Olympics Thailand Theme Song	
2020	"Still2gether"	Still 2gether OST	
2020	"That Person Must be You"	Still 2gether OST	
2020	"Dub Dub Jub Jub OK!"	MAMA OK! Theme Song	
2020	"From the Heart"	Special Olympics Thailand Theme Song	
2021	"Ten Years Later"	2gether: The Movie OST	
2021	"Closer"	VIVO V215G Ads	
2021	"Who am I"	F4 Thailand: Boys Over Flowers OST	
2021	"Shooting Star"	F4 Thailand: Boys Over Flowers OST	
2022	"Silhouette"	F4 Thailand: Boys Over Flowers OST	
2022	"Expect Nothing"	Devil Sister OST	
2022	"Law of Attraction"	Love Out Loud Fan Festival 2022 Theme Song	

== Accolades ==
=== Listicles ===
Year	Organization	Recognition	Ref.
2021	Vogue Thailand	Vogue 100	
2023	Forbes	Forbes 30 Under 30 Asia	
2024	GQ Thailand	GQ Men of the Year 2024	
2024	Dazed Korea	Dazed 100 Asia	
2025	Asia-Pacific Entrepreneurs Association (APEC)	Asia-Pacific U30 Outstanding Young Leaders	
2025	Teen Vogue	Teen Vogue's New Hollywood Rising Stars Class of 2025	

=== Awards and nominations ===
Year	Award	Category	Nominated work	Result	Ref.
2020	LINE Thailand People's Choice Awards 2020	Best Couple	2gether	Won	
2020	Kazz Awards 2020	Kazz Magazine's Favorite	-	Won	
2021	Sanook's Top of the Year Awards 2021	Couple of the Year	2gether	Won	
2021	Sanook's Top of the Year Awards 2021	Thai Song of the Year	"Still2gether" Still 2gether	Won	
2021	Thailand Zocial Awards 2021	Couple of the Year	2gether	Won	
2021	JOOX Thailand Music Awards 2021	Top Social Artist of the Year	-	Nominated	
2021	Line TV Awards 2021	Best Rising Star	-	Won	
2021	Nataraja Awards 2021	Best Cast	2gether	Nominated	
2021	Kazz Awards 2021	Attractive Young Man of the Year	-	Won	
2021	Kazz Awards 2021	Popular Male Teenage Award	-	Won	
2021	Kazz Awards 2021	Imaginary Couple of the year	2gether	Won	
2021	Kazz Awards 2021	Best Scene	2gether	Won	
2021	Asia Artist Awards (AAA) 2021	Asia Celebrity Award (Television/Film)	-	Won	
2022	Asia Dramatic TV Award	Best Couple	2gether	Won	
2022	Thairath Awards 2021	Couple of the Year	2gether	Won	
2022	JOOX Thailand Music awards	Top Social Thai Artist of the Year	-	Nominated	
2022	Kazz Awards 2022	Superstar Award	-	Won	
2022	Bangkok Critics Assembly Awards	Best Movie Song	"10 Years Later" 2gether: The Movie	Nominated	
2022	Suphannahong National Film Awards	Best Original Song	"10 Years Later" 2gether: The Movie	Nominated	
2022	Manee Mekhala 2022	Outstanding Supporting Actor	F4 Thailand: Boys Over Flowers	Won	
2022	Asian Academy Creative Awards 2022	Best Theme Song or Title Theme	"Who Am I" F4 Thailand: Boys Over Flowers	Won	
2023	Nataraja Awards 2023	Best Cast	F4 Thailand: Boys Over Flowers	Nominated	
2023	Sanook's Top of the Year Awards 2022	Actor of the Year	Devil Sister	Won	
2023	11th Thailand Social Awards	Best Creator Performance on Social Media	-	Nominated	
2023	28th Asian Television Awards	Best Actor in a Leading Role	Enigma	Nominated	
2024	The 17th Asian Film Awards	AFA Rising Star Award	-	Won	
2024	Nataraja Awards 2024	Best Leading Actor (Short Form)	Enigma	Nominated	
2024	Seoul International Drama Awards 2024	Outstanding Asian Star (Thailand)	Enigma	Won	
2024	Maya Awards 2024	Actor of the Year	Enigma	Won	
2024	Asia Contents Awards & Global OTT Awards	Best Newcomer Actor (Male)	Enigma	Nominated	
2024	Asia Contents Awards & Global OTT Awards	People's Choice Award (Male)	Enigma	Nominated	
2025	2024 TAG Victorious Awards Chicago	Best Actor (Film)	Under Parallel Skies	Won	
2025	Thailand Box Office Awards 2024	Line Today Outstanding Audience Vote Award (Movie)	Under Parallel Skies	Won	
2025	Thailand Box Office Awards 2024	Line Today Outstanding Audience Vote Award (Series)	Beauty Newbie	Won	
2025	The Guitar Mag Awards 2025	Star Single Hits of the Year	"Night Ride"	Won	
2025	Weibo Gala 2025	Most Influential Overseas Pioneers Icon	-	Won	
2025	Mint Award 2025	Best Cover of the Year	-	Nominated	
2025	Mint Award 2025	Best Digital Cover of the Year	-	Nominated	
2026	31st Asian Television Awards	Best Music Video	"Yours"	Won	
