= 2gether (Thai TV series) =

2020 Thai television series

- Official series poster
- Thai: เพราะเราคู่กัน
- Genre: Boys' love; Romantic comedy
- Based on: Because We ... Belong Together by JittiRain
- Directed by: Weerachit Thongjila
- Starring: Vachirawit Chivaaree; Metawin Opas-iamkajorn
- Opening theme: "Tit Kap (ติดกับ)" by Natthawut Jenmana
- Ending theme: "Kan Goo (คั่นกู)" by Vachirawit Chivaaree
- Country of origin: Thailand
- Original language: Thai
- No. of seasons: 1
- No. of episodes: 13

Production
- Running time: 40–70 minutes
- Production companies: GMMTV; Housestories 8

Original release
- Network: GMM 25; LINE TV
- Release: 21 February – 15 May 2020

Related
- Still 2gether; 2gether: The Movie

2gether (Thai: เพราะเราคู่กัน; RTGS: Phro Rao Khu Kan, lit. 'because we belong together') is a 2020 Thai boys' love-romantic comedy series starring Vachirawit Chivaaree and Metawin Opas-iamkajorn. An adaptation of the 2019 novel Because We ... Belong Together by JittiRain, the series follows the story of two college boys whose fake romantic relationship evolves into an authentic one. Directed by Weerachit Thongjila and produced by GMMTV and Housestories 8, it was showcased at "2020 New & Next" event on 15 October 2019. It premiered on GMM 25 and LINE TV and aired between 21 February and 15 May 2020. 2gether emerged as one of Thailand's most internationally successful boys' love series.

== Synopsis ==
College cheerleader Tine Teepakorn is tired of the constant attention from a male admirer, Green. He plans to pretend to be in a relationship with a boy to discourage his advances. Sarawat Guntithanon, a mysterious musician with aloof personality, becomes the unwilling participant in Tine's charade. Together, they create a fake relationship, with Sarawat hesitantly agreeing to act as Tine's boyfriend. Their fake relationship unknowingly evolves into something more profound, they confront their own insecurities and the complexities of their feelings. Along the way, they encounter supportive friends, family members who are grappling with their own issues. Sarawat & Tine eventually become a real couple, but not before facing their challenges.

== Cast and characters ==
=== Main ===
- Vachirawit Chivaaree (Bright) as Sarawat Guntithanon
  Japanese voiced by Takuya Eguchi

A popular first-year college student from the Faculty of Political Science, a football player, guitarist, member of the Music Club and the band Ctrl+S. Though adored for his good looks, he is stoic and an introvert, who except for his e-mail, does not have any social media accounts. He is persuaded by Tine to become his fake boyfriend, to escape his admirer, Green.

- Metawin Opas-iamkajorn (Win) as Tine Teepakorn
  Japanese voiced by Soma Saito

A self-described "chic", a first-year college student from the Faculty of Law, a member of cheerleading squad. He had few unsuccessful dating records with the girls. He gets chased by his admirer Green, and after few failed attempts to drive him away, he gets convinced by his friends to make the popular guitarist Sarawat his fake boyfriend. Despite his pretend-homosexual relationship with Sarawat, Tine continues to claim that he only likes girls.

=== Supporting ===
- Korawit Boonsri (Gun) as Green
  Japanese voiced by Kotaro Nishiyama

A first-year college student from the Faculty of Humanities and Social Sciences, a member of the Music Club and Dim's boyfriend. Due to his conflicts with Dim, he seeks a new relationship with Tine, his crush with whom he becomes very clingy. After Dim makes amends with him, he starts his relationship over and lets go of Tine.

- Sivakorn Lertchuchot (Guy) as Dim
  Japanese voiced by Daisuke Namikawa

Head of the Music Club and Green's boyfriend.

- Pornnappan Pornpenpipat (Nene) as Air

Secretary of the Music Club.

- Rachanun Mahawan (Film) as Earn

A member of the Music Club and of the club's band Ctrl+S.

- Pattranite Limpatiyakorn (Love) as Pear

A member of the Music Club; Tine's crush.

- Sattabut Laedeke (Drake) as Mil

A student from the Faculty of Architecture who likes Tine, Sarawat's opponent in football competition; Sarawat's younger brother Phukong's love interest.

- Thanatsaran Samthonglai (Frank) as Phukong

Sarawat's younger brother who has a crush on Mil.

- Jirakit Kuariyakul (Toptap) as Type

Tine's elder brother; Man's love interest.

==== Tine's friends ====
- Thanawat Rattanakitpaisan (Khaotung) as Fong
  Japanese voiced by Junya Enoki

Best friends who gives Tine advice.

- Pluem Pongpisal as Phuak

Best friends who is working on his own food review blog.

- Chayakorn Jutamas (JJ) as Ohm

Best friends who is a self-proclaimed social media "god"

==== Sarawat's friends ====
- Chinnarat Siriphongchawalit (Mike) as Man
  Japanese voiced by Yohei Azakami

Best friends who likes Tine's elder brother Type.

- Chanagun Arpornsutinan (Gunsmile) as Boss
  Japanese voiced by Tomoaki Maeno

Best friends, who brings comic relief

=== Guest ===
- Phakjira Kanrattanasoot (Nanan) as Fang

Head of the Faculty of Law's cheerleading squad.

- Benyapa Jeenprasom (View) as Noomnim

Tine's ex who helps him in driving Green away by pretending to be his girlfriend.

- Chalongrat Novsamrong (First) as Chat

One of Mil's coursemates from the Faculty of Architecture.

- Chiwpreecha Thitichaya (Olive) as Ging

Tine's ex (Eps:1)

- Chanunphat Kamolkiriluck (Gigie) as Pam

Sarawat's high school friend and former crush.(Eps:12,13)

- Patchatorn Thanawat (Ployphach)
- Wanwimol Jaenasavamethee (June) as Wan

Tine's friends, in order to distract him from Sarawat, tried to set him with her.

== Soundtrack ==
Its original soundtrack "Kan Goo" (คั่นกู) ranked 1st in Joox "Thailand's Top 100".

Song title	Thai Title RTGS	English Translation	Artist	Ref.
ติดกับ (Tit Gub)	Tit Kap	"Trapped (Stuck on You)"	Natthawut Jenmana (Max)	
คั่นกู (Kan Goo)	Khan Ku	"Separate Me" (Note: The literal meaning of "คั่นกู" (Khan Ku) is to separate me (from someone). However, this word can be sponnerised as "คู่กัน" (Khu Kan), which means together.)	Vachirawit Chivaaree (Bright)	
ตกลงฉันคิดไปเองใช่ไหม (Tok Long Chan Kid Pai Aeng Chai Mai)	Tok-long Chan Khit Pai Eng Chai Mai	"It's All In My Head All This Time?"	Vachirawit Chivaaree (Bright)	

=== Featured songs from the band Scrubb ===
Aside from the official soundtrack, songs from Thai band Scrubb featured in the series, as the character Tine is a fan of the said band. In an interview, JittiRain, the author, mentioned that her being a band's fan inspired her to create the music part in the novel. The band also appeared in the show's 6th and 13th episode.

Song Title	Thai Title RTGS	English Translation	Album	Year	Episode	Ref.
คู่กัน	Khu Kan	"Together"	Club	2005	1	
คำตอบ	Kham Top	"Answer"	Kid	2010	2	
ใกล้	Klai	"Close"	Club	2005	3	
ทุกอย่าง	Thuk Yang	"Everything"	Sssss..!	2003	4 6	
เข้ากันดี	Khao Kan Di	"Click"	Mood	2007	5	
คนนี้	Khon Ni	"This Person"	Kid	2010	5	
ลึกลึก	Luek Luek	"Deep"	Clean	2013	6	
ให้เธอ	Hai Thoe	"To You"	Lite	2008	8	
รักนิรันดร์	Rak Ni-ran	"Eternal Love"	Clean	2013	9	
ขอ	Kho	"Wish"	Sssss..!	2003	9	
รอยยิ้ม	Roi Yim	"Smile"	Clean	2013	11	
เธอหมุนรอบฉัน ฉันหมุนรอบเธอ	Tho Mun Rop Chan. Chan Mun Rop Thoe	"You Revolve Around Me, I Revolve Around You"	Lite	2008	11	
ฝน	Fon	"Rain"	Season	2018	12	
หนี	Ni	"Escape"	Kid	2010	12	
ลืม	Luem	"Forget"	Club	2005	13	
เก็บมันเอาไว้	Kep Man Ao Wai	"Keep It"	Sssss..!	2003	13	
เพลงนั้นยังอยู่	Pleng Nun Yung Yoo	"That Song is Still Here"	Clean	2013	13	
เก็บไว้กับเธอ	Kep Wai Kap Thoe	"Keep It With You"	Mood	2007	13	

== Reception ==
By 19 April 2020, it surpassed 100 million views on LINE TV. In 2020, it was "Top 10 Most Viewed Television Series" on LINE TV and YouTube. The success of the series led to the sequel Still 2gether and 2gether: The Movie.

=== Viewership ===
- In the table below, the blue number represents the lowest ratings and the red number represents the highest ratings.

Episode	Timeslot UTC+07:00	Date	Average Audience Share	Ref.
1	Friday 10:00 pm	21 February 2020	0.116%	
2	Friday 10:00 pm	28 February 2020	0.185%	
3	Friday 10:00 pm	6 March 2020	0.277%	
4	Friday 10:00 pm	13 March 2020	0.297%	
5	Friday 10:00 pm	20 March 2020	0.377%	
6	Friday 10:00 pm	27 March 2020	0.571%	
7	Friday 10:00 pm	3 April 2020	0.587%	
8	Friday 09:30 pm	10 April 2020	0.603%	
9	Friday 09:30 pm	17 April 2020	0.802%	
10	Friday 09:30 pm	24 April 2020	0.718%	
11	Friday 09:30 pm	1 May 2020	0.598%	
12	Friday 09:30 pm	8 May 2020	0.625%	
13	Friday 09:30 pm	15 May 2020	0.825%	
Average			0.506% ^{1}	

^1 Based on the average audience share per episode.

=== Accolades ===
Year	Award	Category	Work	Result	Refs.
2020	Maya Awards	TV Series of the Year	2gether: The Series	Won	
2020	Fever Awards 2020	Best Drama-Series Song Fever Award	"Kan Goo (คั่นกู)" by Bright Vachirawit Chivaaree	Won	
2020	The Best 5 of The Year	TV Series of The Year	2gether: The Series	Won	
2021	Fever Awards	Best TV Series	2gether: The Series	Won	
2021	Line TV Awards	Series of the Year	2gether: The Series	Won	
2021	Line TV Awards	Most Followers of the Year	2gether: The Series	Won	
2021	Line TV Awards	Most Hearted Content of the Year	2gether: The Series	Won	
2021	Line TV Awards	Best Thai Song	"Kan Goo (คั่นกู)" by Bright Vachirawit Chivaaree	Nominated	
2021	12th Nataraja Awards	Best Cast Ensemble	2gether: The Series	Nominated	
2021	12th Nataraja Awards	Best Drama Song Award	"Kan Goo (คั่นกู)" by Bright Vachirawit Chivaaree	Won	

== Sequel ==
On 1 June 2020, GMMTV released a teaser of the sequel Still 2gether. (Note: Thai: เพราะเรา(ยัง)คู่กัน; RTGS: Phro rao (yang) khu kan, lit. Because We (Still) Belong Together) On 14 August 2020, the series premiered on GMM 25 and LINE TV. The sequel is set a year later with Sarawat and Tine trying to balance their relationship and careers.
