= Lost & Found (Bright Vachirawit Chivaaree song) =

2022 single by Bright Vachirawit Chivaaree

Single by Vachirawit Chivaaree
- Released: August 15, 2022
- Genre: R&B; Soul
- Length: 3:36
- Label: GMMTV Records
- Songwriters: Kasidej Hongladaromp; James Alyn Wee
- Producers: Kasidej Hongladaromp; Tanatat Chaiyaat

Bright singles chronology
"Move ไปไหน" (2021)	"Lost & Found" (2022)	"My Ecstasy ft. D. Gerrard" (2023)

Music video
- "Lost & Found" on YouTube

"Lost & Found" is the debut English single by Thai artist Bright Vachirawit Chivaaree. On 15 August 2022, it was first solicited through GMMTV Records, and later on 26 August 2022, it premiered on Spotify, iTunes and JOOX Music. It is written by Kasidej Hongladaromp and James Alyn Wee from HYBS, and produced by Tanatat Chaiyaat and Kasidej Hongladaromp. Bright, as the Director of Creativity, was involved in the story making. It's about a love that once was vibrant, now turned into a painful memory.

== Background and composition ==
"I wanted those who listen to my song to feel the loneliness right from the intro and think of the old days. I believe that everyone might have had a certain someone or a remarkable moment which remains in your memories and which you would think of regularly. It is a feeling that wherever we are or whatever we encounter, we would relate it to that certain memory. The feelings of that point in time would jolt us, though we know that we can't have those moments back."
— Vachirawit Chivaaree

The song is based on the real life story of Bright. He had shared that his inspiration derives from his urge to deliver a perspective on loneliness. The lyrics delve into themes of sorrow, heartache and the inability to move on. Musically, it is a R&B and soul track. The melody and musical arrangement of the song reflects a somber mood, with slow and melancholic tones that further enhance the emotional impact of the lyrics.

Bright had dream to have an English song, with an intention to go on tours, to connect and to sing along with his fans. He receives messages from fans to produce an english song to understand it better. He is aware that when he sings in Thai, it is hard for all to sing along with him.

== Music video ==
Directed by Boss Wasakorn, an official music video was released alongside the sound track, which features the Thai actress and model Rasa Jiratshaya Eshuis, as Bright's partner. The video explores themes of sacrifice, loss, the complexities of love, the emotional struggles associated with the end of a relationship, the longing for someone and an unrequited love.

== Synopsis ==
The music video tells the love story of a couple, once was in pure bliss, now in despair. They experience painful choices, sacrifices and misunderstandings all while desperately trying to hold onto the love they share. The song explores the emotions of heartbreak, longing and the bittersweet nostalgia of lost love. It delves into the complexities of a relationship that has fallen apart, leaving the couple feeling broken and yearning. The video closes with Bright looking his partners' pictures which captures the raw vulnerability and deep sadness, evoking a powerful sense of empathy and reflection for listeners.

"The inspiration behind the making of this MV was what we think about special love, dispayed in most ordinary form. I want everyone to experience and understand it together because this kind of moment can really happen to anyone. Preparation at the time of the shooting was really simple. We acted without scripts. In the morning, all scenes of the past were filmed, where we enjoyed our togetherness. All the break up and dramatic scenes were filmed in the evening." — Vachirawit Chivaaree

== Reception ==
The song entered the iTunes real-time song chart debuting at 3rd in Hong Kong, 6th in Thailand, 16th in Philippines, 22nd in Singapore, 23rd in Japan, 30th in Indonesia, 47th in Austria, 61st in Cambodia, 80th in Malaysia and 98th in Taiwan.

The MV rank 2nd in Worldwide, 1st in Thailand, Hong Kong, Indonesia, Greenland, Liechtenstein, Macao, Malaysia, The Philippines, Myanmar, 2nd in Bhutan, Cambodia, 3rd in Singapore, Laos, 4th in Luxembourg, 5th in Brunei, 6th in Iran, 10th in Mexico, 11th in Afghanistan and 12th in China.

== Credits and personnel ==
- Lyric/Melody : Kasidej Hongladaromp, James Alyn Wee
- Arranged : Kasidej Hongladaromp, James Alyn Wee
- Vocal Director : Kasidej Hongladaromp, James Alyn Wee
- Music Producer: Kasidej Hongladaromp
- Executive Producer: Tanatat Chaiyaat
- Creative Director : Vachirawit Chivaaree

== Awards and nominations ==
Year	Award	Category	Result	Ref.
2023	Guitar Mag Awards 2023	Star Single Hit of the Year	Nominated	
2023	Maya TV Awards 2023	String Artist of the Year	Nominated	
