= Toe Laew =

Thai variety show

- Toe Laew: Season 2 Poster
- Thai: โตแล้ว
- Genre: Travel; Adventure; Comedy; Food
- Presented by: Pathompong Reonchaidee; Patara Eksangkul; Chanagun Arpornsutinan; Vachirawit Chivaaree; Kanaphan Puitrakul
- Country of origin: Thailand
- Original language: Thai
- No. of seasons: 2
- No. of episodes: 195

Production
- Running time: 45 - 50 minutes
- Production company: GMMTV

Original release
- Network: GMM 25; YouTube; LINE TV Season 1; AIS Play Season 2
- Release: 9 April 2016 – 19 December 2020

Toe Laew (Thai: โตแล้ว; lit. Grown Up) is a Thai travelling based variety started in 2016. The show was hosted by Pathompong Reonchaidee (Toy), Patara Eksangkul (Foei), Chanagun Arpornsutinan (Gunsmile), Vachirawit Chivaaree (Bright) and Kanaphan Puitrakul (First). Each episode features different destinations, where the hosts travel, try local cuisines and participate in fun activities. The success of the show led to a second season in 2020.

== Plot ==
The hosts each day travel to selected destination and explore all possible tourism spots, local cuisines and cultural heritage. They experiment with local travelling modes such as bus, tuk-tuk, train and bullock carts. They stay overnight, understand the essence and tales behind localities culture. Along with the journey, hosts involve local people, and participate in fun activities and simple competitions for entertainment. Team mainly covered places within Thailand, and some prominent places in Taiwan, Japan and South Korea.

== Hosts ==
=== Final hosts ===
- Pathompong Reonchaidee (Toy)
- Patara Eksangkul (Foei)
- Chanagun Arpornsutinan (GunSmile)
- Vachirawit Chivaaree (Bright)
- Kanaphan Puitrakul (First)

=== Former hosts ===
- Krithawat Akachai (Non)
- Panta Pattanaampaiwong (Plai)
- Akalavut Mankalasut (Pangpond)
- Yoon Jong Young (Jedi)
- Arachaporn Pokinpakorn (Goy)
- Parada Titawachira (Smile)
- Manasapong Chaancharoom (Ploy)

== Seasons ==
| Season | Episodes | Originally aired | |
| Season | Episodes | Premiere | Finale |
|---|---|---|---|
| Season 1 | 182 | 9 April 2016 | 28 December 2019 |
| Season 2 | 13 | 26 September 2020 | 19 December 2020 |

- Season: 1

On 10 April 2016, the first season premiered on GMM 25 airing on Saturdays at 12:00 ICT with Pathompong Reonchaidee (Toy), Patara Eksangkul (Foei), Krittawat Ekkachai (Non) and Panta Pattanaampaiwong (Plai) as hosts. Later, Chanagun Arpornsutinan, Vachirawit Chivaaree and Kanaphan Puitrakul joined the season from Episode 135 onwards. It is currently available on the streaming platform such as LINE TV and YouTube.

- Season: 2

On 26 September 2020, the second season premiered on GMM 25 and AIS Play, at 10:00 ICT and 12:00 ICT respectively, on Saturday. All previous hosts including Kanaphan Puitrakul (First) joined the second season. It is currently available at YouTube.

== Episode details ==
=== Season: 1 ===
| No. | Date | Location | Artist |
|---|---|---|---|
| 1 | 9 April 2016 | Bang Saen | Non, Plai, Foei, Toy |
| 2 | 16 April 2016 | Bang Saen | Non, Plai, Foei, Toy |
| 3 | 23 April 2016 | Porter Rum | Non, Plai, Foei, Toy |
| 4 | 30 April 2016 | Bangkok | Non, Plai, Foei, Toy |
| 5 | 7 May 2016 | Damnoen Saduak | Non, Plai, Foei, Toy |
| 6 | 14 May 2016 | Yaowara Street, Bangkok | Non, Plai, Foei, Toy |
| 7 | 21 May 2016 | Rangsit | Non, Plai, Foei, Toy |
| 8 | 28 May 2016 | Ayutthaya | Non, Plai, Foei, Toy |
| 9 | 4 June 2016 | Korat Tuscany Valley | Non, Plai, Foei, Toy |
| 10 | 11 June 2016 | Saraburi Jedkod Pongkonsao | Non, Plai, Foei, Toy |
| 11 | 18 June 2016 | Koh Samet | Non, Plai, Foei, Toy Guest: Milk |
| 12 | 25 June 2016 | Rayong | Non, Plai, Foei, Toy |
| 13 | 2 July 2016 | Bangkok | Non, Plai, Foei, Toy |
| 14 | 9 July 2016 | Baan Kachao | Non, Plai, Foei, Toy |
| 15 | 16 July 2016 | Suphan Buri | Non, Plai, Foei, Toy |
| 16 | 23 July 2016 | Buffalo Village, Suphan Buri | Non, Plai, Foei, Toy |
| 17 | 30 July 2016 | Dream World | Non, Plai, Foei, Toy |
| 18 | 6 August 2016 | Nakhon Pathom | Non, Plai, Foei, Toy |
| 19 | 20 August 2016 | Chiang Mai | Non, Plai, Foei, Toy |
| 20 | 27 August 2016 | Pattaya | Non, Plai, Foei, Toy |
| 21 | 3 September 2016 | Chiang Mai | Non, Plai, Foei, Toy |
| 22 | 10 September 2016 | Farm Chokchai Camp | Non, Plai, Foei, Toy |
| 23 | 17 September 2016 | Songkhla | Non, Plai, Foei, Toy |
| 24 | 24 September 2016 | Saraburi | Non, Plai, Foei, Toy |
| 25 | 1 October 2016 | Koh Kret | Non, Plai, Foei, Toy |
| 26 | 8 October 2016 | Hat Yai | Non, Plai, Foei, Toy |
| 27 | 19 November 2016 | Phuket | Non, Plai, Foei, Toy |
| 28 | 26 November 2016 | Phuket | Non, Plai, Foei, Toy |
| 29 | 3 December 2016 | | Non, Plai, Foei, Toy |
| 30 | 10 December 2016 | Chiang Mai | Non, Plai, Foei, Toy |
| 31 | 17 December 2016 | Doi Ang Khang | Non, Plai, Foei, Toy |
| 32 | 24 December 2016 | Bangkok | Non, Plai, Foei, Toy |
| 33 | 31 December 2016 | Cast's House | Non, Plai, Foei, Toy |
| 34 | 7 January 2017 | Bangkok | Non, Plai, Foei, Toy |
| 35 | 14 January 2017 | Nakhon Nayok | Non, Plai, Foei, Toy |
| 36 | 28 January 2017 | Udon Thani | Non, Plai, Foei, Toy |
| 37 | 4 February 2017 | Nong Khai | Non, Plai, Foei, Toy |
| 38 | 11 February 2017 | Bangkok | Non, Plai, Foei, Toy |
| 39 | 18 February 2017 | Chonburi | Non, Plai, Foei, Toy |
| 40 | 25 February 2017 | Chonburi | Non, Plai, Foei, Toy |
| 41 | 4 March 2017 | Chanthaburi | Non, Plai, Foei, Toy |
| 42 | 11 March 2017 | Chanthaburi | Non, Plai, Foei, Toy |
| 43 | 18 March 2017 | Sukhothai | Non, Plai, Foei, Toy |
| 44 | 25 March 2017 | Si Satchanalai | Non, Plai, Foei, Toy |
| 45 | 1 April 2017 | Rajjaprabha Dam | Non, Plai, Foei, Toy |
| 46 | 8 April 2017 | Rajjaprabha Dam | Non, Plai, Foei, Toy |
| 47 | 15 April 2017 | Bangkok 1st Anniversary | Non, Plai, Foei, Toy, Guest: Goi |
| 48 | 22 April 2017 | Ko Lan, Pattaya | Non, Plai, Toy, Pangpond |
| 49 | 29 April 2017 | Ko Lan, Pattaya | Non, Plai, Toy, Pangpond |
| 50 | 6 May 2017 | Hua Hin, Samut Sakhon | Non, Plai, Foei, Toy Guests: Sarannat Praduquyamdee, Aniporn Chalermburanawong, Arpatsara Lertprasert, Natathida Damrongwisetphanit |
| 51 | 13 May 2017 | Samut Songkhram | Non, Plai, Foei, Toy |
| 52 | 20 May 2017 | Chachoengsao | Non, Plai, Foei, Goi |
| 53 | 27 May 2017 | Bangkok | Non, Plai, Foei, Guest: Rusameekae Fagerlund |
| 54 | 3 June 2017 | Bangkok | Non, Pangpond, Plai, Foei |
| 55 | 10 June 2017 | Ubon Ratchathani | Pangpond, Plai, Foei, Toy |
| 56 | 17 June 2017 | Ubon Ratchathani | Pangpond, Plai, Foei, Toy |
| 57 | 24 June 2017 | Khao Yai | Goy, Pangpond, Plai, Toy |
| 58 | 1 July 2017 | Khao Yai | Goy, Pangpond, Plai, Toy |
| 59 | 8 July 2017 | Bangkok | Goy, Non, Plai, Foei |
| 60 | 15 July 2017 | Bangkok | Non, Pangpond, Plai, Toy |
| 61 | 22 July 2017 | Bangkok | Goy, Pangpond, Plai, Toy |
| 62 | 29 July 2017 | Chulachomklao Royal Military Academy | Non, Pangpond, Plai, Toy |
| 63 | 5 August 2017 | Nakhon Si Thammarat Kirivong | Non, Pangpond, Plai, Toy |
| 64 | 12 August 2017 | Bangkok | Non, Pangpond, Plai, Toy, Goy |
| 65 | 19 August 2017 | Nakhon Si Thammarat | Non, Pangpond, Plai, Toy |
| 66 | 26 August 2017 | Chiang Mai | Goi, Pangpond, Plai, Foei |
| 67 | 2 September 2017 | Chiang Mai | Goi, Pangpond, Plai, Foei |
| 68 | 9 September 2017 | Phetchabun Khao Kho | Goi, Plai, Foei, Jedi |
| 69 | 16 September 2017 | Phetchabun Khao Kho | Goi, Plai, Foei, Jedi |
| 70 | 23 September 2017 | Clone Corn | Jedi, Pangpond, Plai, Foei |
| 71 | 30 September 2017 | Ko Samet | Jedi, Plai, Foei, Toy |
| 72 | 7 October 2017 | Ko Samet | Jedi, Plai, Foei, Toy |
| 73 | 4 November 2017 | Rayong | Jedi, Plai, Foei, Toy |
| 74 | 11 November 2017 | Uthai Thani | Non, Pangpond, Plai, Toy |
| 75 | 18 November 2017 | Lopburi | Non, Pangpond, Plai, Toy |
| 76 | 25 November 2017 | Phuket | Goy, Plai, Foei, Toy |
| 77 | 2 December 2017 | Phuket | Goy, Plai, Foei, Toy |
| 78 | 9 December 2017 | Nan | Jedi, Pangpond, Plai, Foei |
| 79 | 16 December 2017 | Nan | Jedi, Pangpond, Plai, Foei |
| 80 | 23 December 2017 | Bangkok | Goy, Pangpond, Plai, Toy |
| 81 | 30 December 2017 | 2017 Rewind | |
| 82 | 6 January 2018 | Ratchaburi Swampung | Goy, Pangpond, Plai, Foei |
| 83 | 13 January 2018 | Ratchaburi | Goy, Pangpond, Plai, Foei |
| 84 | 20 January 2018 | Thonburi | Pangpond, Plai, Foei, Toy |
| 85 | 27 January 2018 | Kaeng Krachan National Park | Jedi, Plai, Foei |
| 86 | 3 February 2018 | Chaam, Phetchaburi | Jedi, Plai, Foei |
| 87 | 10 February 2018 | Chonburi | Goy, Jedi, Plai, Ploy |
| 88 | 17 February 2018 | Chachoengsao | Jedi, Plai, Ploy, Toy |
| 89 | 24 February 2018 | Chiang Mai | Non, Goi, Ploy, Foei |
| 90 | 3 March 2018 | Chiang Mai | Non, Goi, Ploy, Foei |
| 91 | 10 March 2018 | Prachinburi | Non, Plai, Jedi, Toi |
| 92 | 17 March 2018 | Sakeo | Non, Plai, Jedi, Toi |
| 93 | 24 March 2018 | Bangkok | Ploy, Plai, Foei, Toy, Smile |
| 94 | 31 March 2018 | Kanchanaburi | Goy, Ploy, Plai, Toy |
| 95 | 7 April 2018 | Ranong | Goy, Plai, Jedi, Foei |
| 96 | 21 April 2018 | Koh Payam | Goy, Plai, Jedi, Foei |
| 97 | 28 April 2018 | Khon Kaen | Goy, Ploy, Plai, Foy |
| 98 | 5 May 2018 | Isan | Goy, Ploy, Plai, Foy |
| 99 | 12 May 2018 | Prachuap Khiri Khan Province | Goy, Ploy, Jedi, Plai |
| 100 | 19 May 2018 | Prachuap Khiri Khan Province | Goy, Ploy, Jedi, Plai |
| 101 | 26 May 2018 | Pattaya | Plai, Jedi, Foei, Toy |
| 102 | 2 June 2018 | Pattaya | Plai, Jedi, Foei, Toy |
| 103 | 9 June 2018 | Scone Island | Goy, Plai, Ploy, Foy |
| 104 | 16 June 2018 | Isan | Goy, Plai, Ploy, Foy |
| 105 | 23 June 2018 | Chiang Rai | Goy, Plai, Ploy, Toy |
| 106 | 30 June 2018 | Chiang Rai | Goy, Plai, Ploy, Toy |
| 107 | 7 July 2018 | Ko Chang | Non, Pangpond, Foei, Toy |
| 108 | 14 July 2018 | Ko Chang | Non, Pangpond, Foei, Toy |
| 109 | 21 July 2018 | Japan | Plai, Jedi, Pangpond, Toy |
| 110 | 28 July 2018 | Bangkok | Plai, Jedi, Pangpond, Toy Guest: Sanni Antikainen |
| 111 | 4 August 2018 | Amphawa Floating Market | Plai, Jedi, Pangpond, Foei |
| 112 | 11 August 2018 | Bangkok | Non, Plai, Pangpond, Foei, Toy |
| 113 | 18 August 2018 | Bangkok | Non, Plai, Pangpond, Toy |
| 114 | 25 August 2018 | Bangkok | Non, Plai, Foei, Toy |
| 115 | 1 September 2018 | Khao Yai | Goi, Plai, Jedi, Smile |
| 116 | 8 September 2018 | Khao Yai | Goi, Plai, Pangpond, Jedi, Smile |
| 117 | 15 September 2018 | Buriram | Plai, Pangpond, Foei, Toy |
| 118 | 22 September 2018 | Buriram | Plai, Pangpond, Foei, Toy |
| 119 | 29 September 2018 | Chiang Mai | Plai, Foei Guest: Too Sirat Intarachote |
| 120 | 6 October 2018 | Chiang Mai | Plai, Foei Guest: Too Sirat Intarachote |
| 121 | 13 October 2018 | Kanchanaburi | Goy, Foei, Toy |
| 122 | 20 October 2018 | Kanchanaburi | Goy, Foei, Toy |
| 123 | 27 October 2018 | Pak Chong | Non, Plai, Foei, Toy, Guest: Jack Chaleumpol Tikumpornteerawong |
| 124 | 3 November 2018 | Bangkok | Non, Toy Guest: Too Sirat Intarachote, Sombatsara Teerasaroch |
| 125 | 10 November 2018 | Ayutthaya | Plai, Jedi, Foei, Toy, Guest: Jiyoung |
| 126 | 17 November 2018 | Phuket | Plai, Foei, Toy, Guest: Somjit Jongjoho |
| 127 | 24 November 2018 | Khao Lak | Plai, Foei, Toy, Guest: Winravee Yaisamoe |
| 128 | 1 December 2018 | Rayong Beach | Plai, Pangpond, Jedi, Foei, Guest: Numchok Thanatram |
| 129 | 8 December 2018 | Bangkok | Non, Goy, Plai, Toy |
| 130 | 15 December 2018 | Vana Nava Water Jungle | Non, Goy, Plai, Foei, Toy |
| 131 | 22 December 2018 | Vana Nava Water Jungle | Non, Goy, Plai, Foei, Toy |
| 132 | 29 December 2018 | 2018 Rewind | Goy, Plai, Pangpond |
| 133 | 5 January 2019 | 2018 Rewind | Goy, Plai, Pangpond |
| 134 | 12 January 2019 | Dream World | Plai, Pangpond, Jedi, Foei, Toy |
| 135 | 19 January 2019 | Thanks Giving | Toy, Bright, First, GunSmile |
| 136 | 26 January 2019 | Chiang Rai | Prai, Pangpond, Foei, Toy |
| 137 | 2 February 2019 | Chiang Rai | Prai, Pangpond, Foei, Toy |
| 138 | 9 February 2019 | | Toy, Bright, First, GunSmile |
| 139 | 16 February 2019 | Bangkok | Foei, Toy, Bright, First |
| 140 | 23 February 2019 | Sa Kaeo | Foei, Toy, Bright, First |
| 141 | 2 March 2019 | Samae San Island | Foei, Bright, First, GunSmile |
| 142 | 9 March 2019 | Rayong | Foei, Toy, Bright, GunSmile |
| 143 | 16 March 2019 | Nakhon Pathom | Foei, Toy, Bright, First |
| 144 | 23 March 2019 | Bangkok | Foei, Toy, Bright, First |
| 145 | 30 March 2019 | Ratchaburi | Foei, Toy, Bright, Gun Smile |
| 146 | 13 April 2019 | Rewind | Foei, Toy, Bright, First |
| 147 | 20 April 2019 | | Foei, Toy, Bright, First |
| 148 | 27 April 2019 | | Foei, Toy, Bright, First |
| 149 | 11 May 2019 | Phetchaburi | Foei, Toy, Bright, GunSmile |
| 150 | 18 May 2019 | Mark Island | Foei, Toy, Bright, First |
| 151 | 25 May 2019 | Mark Island | Foei, Toy, Bright, First |
| 152 | 1 June 2019 | Pattaya | Toy, Bright, First, GunSmile |
| 153 | 8 June 2019 | Pattaya | Toy, Bright, First, GunSmile |
| 154 | 15 June 2019 | Saraburi | Foei, Toy, Bright, First |
| 155 | 22 June 2019 | Bangkok | Foei, Toy, Bright, First |
| 156 | 29 June 2019 | Bangkok | Foei, Toy, Bright, First |
| 157 | 6 July 2019 | Bangkok | Foei, Toy, Bright, First Guest: Panpond, Mook |
| 158 | 13 July 2019 | Bangkok | Foei, Toy, Bright, First |
| 159 | 20 July 2019 | Bangkok | Foei, Toy, Bright, GunSmile |
| 160 | 27 July 2019 | Lopburi Root Mountain | Foei, Toy, Bright, First, Guest: Too |
| 161 | 3 August 2019 | Chiang Khan | Foei, Toy, Bright, First |
| 162 | 10 August 2019 | Chachoengsao | Foei, Toy, Bright, First |
| 163 | 17 August 2019 | Samut Prakan | Foei, Toy, Bright, First |
| 164 | 24 August 2019 | Mukdahan | Foei, Toy, Bright, First |
| 165 | 31 August 2019 | Savannakhet | Foei, Toy, Bright, First |
| 166 | 7 September 2019 | Bangkok | Foei, Toy, Bright, First |
| 167 | 14 September 2019 | Bangkok | Foei, Toy, Bright, Guest: Panpond |
| 168 | 21 September 2019 | Phatthalung | Foei, Bright, GunSmile, Guest: Top Tap |
| 169 | 28 September 2019 | Phatthalung | Foei, Bright, GunSmile, Guest: Top Tap |
| 170 | 5 October 2019 | Lopburi | Foei, Toy, First, GunSmile |
| 171 | 12 October 2019 | Lopburi | Foei, Toy, First, GunSmile |
| 172 | 19 October 2019 | Bangkok | Foei, Bright, First, GunSmile |
| 173 | 26 October 2019 | Pattaya | Foei, Bright, First, GunSmile |
| 174 | 2 November 2019 | Zanook Wake Park, Bangkok | Foei, Toy, Bright, First, GunSmile |
| 175 | 9 November 2019 | Ximending, Chiang Koi-Shek & Taipei, Taiwan | Foei, Toy, Bright, GunSmile |
| 176 | 16 November 2019 | Ximending, Chiang Koi-Shek & Taipei, Taiwan | Foei, Toy, Bright, GunSmile |
| 177 | 23 November 2019 | Ximending, Chiang Koi-Shek & Taipei, Taiwan | Foei, Toy, Bright, GunSmile |
| 178 | 30 November 2019 | Seoul, South Korea | Foei, Toy, Bright, First |
| 179 | 7 December 2019 | Jeju Island, South Korea | Foei, Toy, Bright, First |
| 180 | 14 December 2019 | Everland, South Korea | Foei, Toy, Bright, First |
| 181 | 21 December 2019 | | Foei, Toy, Bright, First |
| 182 | 28 December 2019 | | |

=== Season: 2 ===
| No. | Date | Location | Guest |
|---|---|---|---|
| 1 | 26 September 2020 | Bang Rachan | Foei, Toy, GunSmile, First & Bright |
| 2 | 3 October 2020 | Chanthaburi Province | Foei, Toy, GunSmile, First |
| 3 | 10 October 2020 | Bang Lamphu | Toy, GunSmile, First, Guest: TopTap |
| 4 | 17 October 2020 | Uthai Thani | Toy, GunSmile, First |
| 5 | 24 October 2020 | Songkhla | Foei, Toy, GunSmile, First |
| 6 | 31 October 2020 | Krung Ching, Nakhon Si Thammarat Province | Foei, Toy, GunSmile, First |
| 7 | 7 November 2020 | Khek Noi, Phetchabun Province | Foei, Toy, First, Bright |
| 8 | 14 November 2020 | Lopburi Province | Foei, Toy, GunSmile, First |
| 9 | 21 November 2020 | Nan La, Chiang Rai Province | Foei, Toy, First, Bright |
| 10 | 28 November 2020 | Pang Kong, Chiang Rai Province | Foei, GunSmile, First, Bright |
| 11 | 5 December 2020 | Huayot, Trang Province | Foei, Toy, GunSmile, First & Bright |
| 12 | 12 December 2020 | Robben Island | Foei, Toy, GunSmile, First & Bright |
| 13 | 19 December 2020 | | Foei, Toy, GunSmile, First & Bright |
