= Joox Thailand Music Awards =

Annual music award

- Current: 2022 Joox Thailand Music Awards
- Awarded for: Excellence in music
- Country: Thailand
- Presented by: Joox Thailand
- First award: 2017; 9 years ago
- Website: Official website

Joox Thailand Music Awards (styled as JOOX Thailand Music Awards), is an annual music awards presented by JOOX Thailand. The awards honor people in the Thai entertainment industry and their achievements in the field of music.

The first ceremony was held on 23 March 2017 at Centerpoint Studio.

== Ceremonies ==
#	Date	Venue
1st	23 March 2017	Centerpoint Studio, Bangkok
2nd	21 March 2018	KBank Siam Pic-Ganesha, Siam Square One, Bangkok
3rd	19 March 2019	KBank Siam Pic-Ganesha, Siam Square One, Bangkok
4th	1 July 2020	Virtual event
5th	28 May 2021	Joox Buzz, short VDO format
6th	5 April 2022	Virtual event

== Categories ==
As of 2020, there are 19 categories:

=== Main awards ===
- Song of the Year
- Artist of the Year
- New Artist of the Year
- Pop Song of the Year
- Hip-Hop/R&B Song of the Year
- Rock Song of the Year
- Indie Song of the Year
- Remake Song of the Year
- Collaboration Song of the Year
- K-POP Artist of the Year
- International Artist of the Year
- Luk Thung/Pua Chewit of the Year
- Karaoke of the Year
- All Time Hits of the Year

=== Special awards ===
- Most Stylish Male
- Most Stylish Female
- Thailand's Male Sweetheart
- Thailand's Female Sweetheart
- Social Superstar
