= Congrats My Ex! =

2023 Thai romance comedy film

- Teaser poster
- Directed by: Prueksa Amaruji
- Screenplay by: Prueksa Amaruji; Vikram Yashpal Malhotra
- Produced by: Rachawin Narula; Kulthep Narula; Pornchai Wongdsriudomporn
- Starring: Ranee Campen; Vachirawit Chivaaree; Mahir Pandhi; Anahita Bhooshan
- Distributed by: Benetone Films
- Release date: November 16, 2023
- Running time: 95 minutes
- Countries: Thailand; India
- Languages: Thai; English; Hindi

Congrats My Ex! (Thai: ลุ้นรักป่วน ก๊วนแฟนเก่า), is a 2023 Thai-Indian romantic comedy film starring Bella Ranee Campen, Bright Vachirawit Chivaaree, Mahir Pandhi and Anahita Bhooshan in the main roles. The film is about the chaotic love of an ex in the midst of a vibrant Indian wedding. It is directed by Prueksa Amaruji and produced by Benetone Films. On 16 November 2023, it officially released on Thai Theatres, and worldwide premiered in more than 240 countries, on a global streaming platform Prime Video. The film ranked 1st in 'Most Viewed', listed in Top 5 best romcom in Prime Video and won three awards in Asian Academy Creative Awards 2024.

On 16 November 2023. Prime Video along with cast, director and production team of the movie, held the special premiere at Paragon Cineplex, Thailand.

== Plot ==
Risa, an owner of a wedding planning company, runs the business along with her close friends Jan and Aoffy. They are assigned a task of orchestrating a grand Indian wedding. Risa who is on the brink of bankruptcy, reluctantly accepts to organise this Indian wedding project to revive her struggling business.

The wedding is of her unresolved ex Arun with Monica, an Indian couple, who have come to Thailand along with their substantial entourage of relatives to conduct their ceremony. To complicate things further, she enlists the help of her other ex Tim, who is this event's photographer. This Indian wedding extravaganza is poised with rollercoaster, as former lovers reunite.

== Casts ==
Character	Cast	Notes
Ranee Campen	Risa	Wedding Planner
Vachirawit Chivaaree	Tim	Event Photographer
Mahir Pandhi	Arun	Indian Bridegroom
Anahita Bhooshan	Monica	Indian Bride
Fern-Passakorn Ponlaboon	Jan	Risa's friend and business member
Pingpong-Thongchai Thongkanthom	Aoffy	Risa's friend and business member
Hasina Hora	Chavee	Risa's Friend
Porwilai Apirachandaporn	Buay	Risa's Secretary
Himanshu Vajubhai	Karun	Arun's Father
Anjana Ghogar	Maya	Arun's Mother
Aruni Bagga	Pathama	Monica's Mother
Sudhanshu Singhal	Manoj	Monica's Father
Darina Boonchu		Guest Role Office Lady

== Reception ==
Congrats My Ex! became one of the most anticipated movie in 2023. Upon the poster release, it has received positive responses from the public. It created enough buzz to become Thai's top most searched movie in the month of October and by end of November it had 100M searches in TikTok, a social media platform. The movie remained in Prime's Top 10 ranking in many countries, and ranked no. 1 in Prime Video, Thailand for more than two months. The chemistry of lead characters were well received by the audience.

In 2024, the movie was ranked 1st in most viewed and listed in Top 5 best romcom in Prime Video. The movie was promoted by production house Benetone Film in Cannes Film Festival to showcase creativity and growth of the Thai industry in the global market.

== Soundtrack ==
The movie has a Hindi song "Hayi Shava" which in a month got 2M views at Benetone Films, and Prime Video official music channel in Thailand, Singapore and Indonesia.

Title	Artist	Channel	Music	Lyrics	Length	Ref.
"Hayi Shava"	Tushar Joshi & Simran Choudhary	Benetone Films; Prime Video	Darshan & Umang	Siddhant Kaushal	3:48	

== Production ==
=== Development ===
Ranee Campen while reading the script felt Tim's character was suitable for Bright Vachirawit, so she suggested him for casting, the offer for the role was made to him, which he accepted.

The casts recruitment was handled by Benetone Films, which have experience in producing many popular movies. Benetone Films partnered with T&B Global Media, GMMTV, Slap Monsters, PTG Entertainment and W Empire on production. On 12 October 2022, an acting workshop was conducted for all the prime casts. On 24 October 2022, the official shooting of the film began. The Indian dance sequence took two weeks for shootings, for Thai artists it was their first experience in dancing while wearing heavy traditional clothes.

=== Concepts ===
Kuldeep Narula, Benetone Films CEO revealed that the concept majorly came from the tapestry of Indian wedding culture and its length during the function. The other theme behind this film was the universal experience one faces meeting their ex-partners.

== Post production ==
On 2 October 2023, Prime Video, a global streaming platform, launched a special campaign "Unboxing Thai Entertainment" at the Gaysorn Tower for the first time with a collection of many Thai content. Mr. Rachawin Narula and Mr. Kulthep Narula, two executives of Benetone Films attended this event as representative of the movie 'Congrats My Ex!', stating that it is a blend of Thai filmmaking with splash of bollywood flavours.

On 27 September 2023, Prime Video in Thailand and Indonesia, along with Benetone Films shared the teaser photos promoting the movie on their official social media accounts. On 23 October 2023, David Simonsen, director of Prime Video - Southeast Asia, revealed that the movie will get broadcast in 240 countries.

== Awards and nominations ==
Year	Award	Category	Note	Result	Ref.
2024	Asian Academy Creative Awards; National Award: Thailand	Best Actor	Vachirawit Chivaaree	Won	
2024	Asian Academy Creative Awards; National Award: Thailand	Best Actress; In Leading Role	Ranee Campen	Won	
2024	Asian Academy Creative Awards; National Award: Thailand	Best Actress; In Comic Role	Ranee Campen	Won	
