= 2019 Joox Thailand Music Awards =

Edition of music award ceremony

3rd JOOX Thailand Music Awards
- Date: 19 March 2019
- Location: KBank Siam Pic-Ganesha, Siam Square One, Bangkok, Thailand
- Presented by: JOOX Thailand
- Hosted by: Niti Chaichitathorn

Highlights
- Most awards: OG-ANIC; The TOYS (2 each)
- Most nominations: The TOYS (5)

Television/radio coverage
- Network: JOOX App; PPTV (Encore)

The 3rd JOOX Thailand Music Awards was an awarding ceremony presented by JOOX Thailand, giving recognition to the Thai entertainment industry in the field of music for their achievements in the year 2018. Nominees in 11 out of 12 main categories were voted upon by fans through the JOOX app. Voting period started on 11 February 2019 and ended on 28 February 2019. The nominees in the Karaoke of the Year category were determined by their number of streams via the app.

The awards night was held at the KBank Siam Pic-Ganesha, Siam Square One, Bangkok, Thailand on Tuesday, 19 March 2019 and broadcast through the JOOX app with an encore presentation on PPTV.

== Awards ==
Nominations were announced on 11 February 2019. Winners are listed first and highlighted in bold:

Song of the Year	Artist of the Year
**"ซ่อนกลิ่น" (Sorn Klin) by Palmy**; "ภาพจำ" (Pahp Jum) by Pongkool Suebsung; "Good Morning Teacher" by Chanakan Rattana-udom; "Stars" by The TOYS; "มีผลต่อหัวใจ" (Mee Pon Tor Hua Jai) by Tanont Chumroen	**The TOYS**; Bodyslam; Palmy; Chanakan Rattana-udom; Tanont Chumroen
New Face Artist of the Year	Pop Song of the Year
**OG-ANIC**; Phum Viphurit; WONDERFRAME; D Gerrard; Whal & Dolph	**"ลาลาลอย (100%)" (La La Loi (100%)) by The TOYS**; "มีผลต่อหัวใจ" (Mee Pon Tor Hua Jai) by Tanont Chumroen; "ซ่อนกลิ่น" (Sorn Klin) by Palmy; "ภาพจำ" (Pahp Jum) by Pongkool Suebsung; "ถ้าฉันหายไป" (Tha Chan Hai Pai) by Patravee Srisuntisuk
Hip-Hop Song of the Year	Rock Song of the Year
**"เป็นไรไหม?" (Pen Rai Mai?) by OG-ANIC ft. LazyLoxy**; "นอนได้แล้ว" (Naun Dai Laeo) by F.Hero ft. The TOYS; "อยากนอนกับเธอ" (Yak Non Kap Ter) by Dek Leiang Khway ft. OG-ANIC; "Galaxy" by D Gerrard ft. Kob The X Factor; "Bye Bye" by P-Hot ft. YOUNGOHM	**"รู้ดีว่าไม่ดี" (Roo Dee Wah Mai Dee) by Getsunova ft. YOUNGOHM**; "วิชาตัวเบา" (Wi Cha Tua Bao) by Bodyslam; "เท่าไหร่ไม่จำ" (Tao Rai Mai Jum) by Potato; "ได้ไหม" (Dai Mai) by Rangsan Panyaruen; "เกลียด" (Kliat) by The Yers
Indie Song of the Year	Karaoke of the Year
**"อาวรณ์" (Ah Won) by Polycat**; "Lover Boy" by Phum Viphurit; "คิดถึงขนาด" (Kit Teung Kanat) by Somkiat; "ซ่อน" (Son) by TELEx TELEXs; "คนชั่ว" (Kon Chua) by The Parkinson	**"จริงๆ มันก็ดี" (Ching Ching Man Kodi) by Gena Desouza**; "04:00" by The TOYS; "หัวร้อน" (Huaron) by JSPKK; "คนโดนเท" (Kon Dohn Tay) by Flame; "ถอย" (Toy) by Gliss
Collaboration Song of the Year	Luk Thung/Pua Chewit of the Year
**"อยู่ดีๆก็" (Yoo Dee Dee Gor) by WONDERFRAME ft. YOUNGOHM**; "Nobody Like You" by Palitchoke Ayanaputra ft. Hollaphonic; "ดวงจันทร์กลางวัน" (Duang Chan Klang Wan) by Getsunova ft. Violette Wautier; "บอกตัวเอง" (Bok Tua Eng) by Room 39 ft. Pathompong Sombatpiboon; "เป็นไรไหม?" (Pen Rai Mai?) by OG-ANIC ft. LazyLoxy	**"ห่อหมกฮวกไปฝากป้า" (Hor Mok Huak Pai Fahk Pah) by Tae Trakooltor ft. Lumplend Wongsaklon**; "สายแนนหัวใจ" (Sai Naen Hua Jai) by Kong Huayrai; "บุญผลา" (Boon Pala) by Mike Phiromphorn; "เฮ็ดทุกวิถีทาง" (Het Thuk Withithang) by Ble Patumrach R-Siam ft. Kong Huayrai; "ซังได้ซังแล้ว" (Sang Dai Sang Leaw) by Tai Orathai
International Artist of the Year	K-POP Artist of the Year
**Justin Bieber**; Ariana Grande; Alan Walker; Dua Lipa; Drake	**GOT7**; BTS; BLACKPINK; EXO; Wanna One

== Multiple nominations and awards ==
Artists that received multiple nominations
Nominations	Artist
5	The TOYS
3	OG-ANIC
3	Palmy
3	Tanont Chumroen
2	Bodyslam
2	Chanakan Rattana-udom
2	D Gerrard
2	Getsunova
2	Phum Viphurit
2	Pongkool Suebsung
2	WONDERFRAME

Artists that received multiple awards
Wins	Artist
2	OG-ANIC
2	The TOYS
