= Still 2gether =

2020 Thai television series

- Official series poster
- Thai: เพราะเรา(ยัง)คู่กัน
- Genre: Boys' love; Romantic comedy
- Created by: GMMTV
- Based on: Because We ... Belong Together (เพราะเรา ... คู่กัน) by JittiRain
- Directed by: Noppharnach Chaiwimol
- Starring: Vachirawit Chivaaree; Metawin Opas-iamkajorn
- Opening theme: "Tit Kap (ติดกับ)" by Natthawut Jenmana
- Ending theme: "Yang Koo Gun (ยังคู่กัน)" by Vachirawit Chivaaree and Metawin Opas-iamkajorn
- Country of origin: Thailand
- Original language: Thai
- No. of episodes: 5

Production
- Running time: 55–60 minutes
- Production company: GMMTV

Original release
- Network: GMM 25; LINE TV
- Release: 14 August – 11 September 2020

Related
- 2gether; 2gether: The Movie

Still 2gether (Thai: เพราะเรา(ยัง)คู่กัน; RTGS: Phro Rao (Yang) Khu Kan, lit. "Because We (Still) Belong Together") is a Thai boys' love-romantic comedy starring Vachirawit Chivaaree (Bright) and Metawin Opas-iamkajorn (Win). A sequel to 2gether (2020), it was directed by Aof Noppharnach and produced by GMMTV and premiered on 14 August 2020 on GMM 25 and LINE TV platforms.

== Synopsis ==
As Tine (Metawin Opas-iamkajorn) and Sarawat (Vachirawit Chivaaree) enter the second year of their relationship full of love and warmth for each other, they also begin to take on bigger responsibilities in the university with the former as the new president of the cheerleading club while the latter as the new president of the music club. With both clubs moving into adjacent rooms, this causes them to compete with each other during practice sessions. The growing quarrel between these clubs, which has already involved their friends, will challenge Tine and Sarawat's relationship.

== Cast and characters ==
=== Main ===
- Vachirawit Chivaaree (Bright) as Sarawat Guntithanon

A popular college student from the Faculty of Political Science, a football player, guitarist, lead member of the band "Ctrl+S" and new president of the music club.

- Metawin Opas-iamkajorn (Win) as Tine Teepakorn

A college student from the Faculty of Law, the new president of his faculty's cheerleading squad and the new secretary of the music club.

=== Supporting ===
- Sivakorn Lertchuchot (Guy) as Dim

Former head of the music club and Green's boyfriend. He graduates in this series and asks Sarawat to become new head of the music club. He keeps on assisting the club.

- Rachanun Mahawan (Film) as Earn

A member of the music club and of the club's band "Ctrl+S".

- Korawit Boonsri (Gun) as Green

A college student from the Faculty of Humanities and Social Sciences, a member of the music club, a new member of the cheerleading club, and Dim's boyfriend.

- Thanatsaran Samthonglai (Frank) as Phukong

Sarawat's younger brother, Mil's boyfriend and a new member of the cheerleading squad.

- Pattranite Limpatiyakorn (Love) as Pear

A member of the cheerleading squad and Boss' love interest.

- Jirakit Kuariyakul (Toptap) as Type

Tine's elder brother and Man's boyfriend.

- Thanawat Rattanakitpaisan (Khaotung) as Fong

Tine's best friends

- Chayakorn Jutamas (JJ) as Ohm

Tine's best friends

- Chanagun Arpornsutinan (Gunsmile) as Boss

One of Sarawat's best friends who has a crush on Pear. Football player of the Faculty of Political Science.

- Chinnarat Siripongchawalit (Mike) as Man

One of Sarawat's best friends and Type's boyfriend. Football player of the Faculty of Political Science.

- Sattabut Laedeke (Drake) as Mil

A student from the Faculty of Architecture and Phukong's boyfriend. Part of the Faculty of Architecture’s football team and the lead vocalist of a band. He substitutes as the lead guitarist of "Ctrl+S" when there was an emergency in the music club.

- Watchara Sukchum (Jennie) as herself

A legendary electric guitarist who appeared in the music club's event.(Ep. 2)

- Phakjira Kanrattanasoot (Nanan) as Fang

Former head of the Faculty of Law's cheerleading squad. Also an adviser for the cheerleading team. (Ep. 1, 2 & 4)

== Episodes ==
No.	Title	Original release date
1	"Episode 1"	14 August 2020
A year after the events of 2gether, Tine and Sarawat face new responsibilities as the leaders of their respective clubs. As Sarawat chooses Tine to be the music club's new secretary, some people start to question his qualifications. This prompts Tine to prove himself worthy of the position.
2	"Episode 2"	21 August 2020
With both clubs moving into adjacent rooms, trouble ensues as Tine's and Sarawat's club members have to compete with each other during practice sessions. Boss and Phukong continue to pursue their respective love interests while Type struggles to tell Man about his consequential job promotion.
3	"Episode 3"	28 August 2020
As both clubs get busy for the "2U Traditional Football Match," Tine and Sarawat have to focus on their respective club performances making it difficult for them to find time for each other. To make matters worse, Tine later finds out that Sarawat has to stay out for two weeks for band rehearsals.
4	"Episode 4"	4 September 2020
The strict house rules in Dim's place makes it difficult for Sarawat to get in touch with Tine. As the music club rehearsals get intense, a mishap happens to one of their members prompting the group to find a replacement. With high hopes of being reunited during the "2U Traditional Football Match," Tine's and Sarawat's responsibilities to their respective clubs keep getting in the way.
5	"Episode 5"	11 September 2020
After enduring weeks of constant rehearsals for the "2U Traditional Football Match," both clubs reward their members with a beach getaway. However, the unresolved quarrel between Dim and Green threatens to spoil the fun. Tine meanwhile sets up a plan to surprise Sarawat for their couple anniversary.

== Soundtrack ==
The series' original soundtrack "Yang Koo Gun" (ยังคู่กัน) ranked first for three consecutive weeks in Joox Thailand's Top 100. It also ranked first at Week 32 of Joox Thailand's Top 20 Social Chart.

Song title	English title	Artist	Ref.
ติดกับ (Tit Gub) (Note: As continuation to 2gether.)	"Trapped"	Natthawut Jenmana (Max)	
ยังคู่กัน (Yang Koo Gun)	"Still Together"	Vachirawit Chivaaree (Bright) ft. Metawin Opas-iamkajorn (Win)	
With A Smile: Eraserheads (Note: Only for the Philippine version of the said series.)		Vachirawit Chivaaree (Bright)	
คนนั้นต้องเป็นเธอ (Kon Nan Taung Pen Tur)	"That Person Must Be You"	Metawin Opas-iamkajorn (Win)	

== Reception ==
On 14 August 2020, after the release of the premiere episode, the series became the top trending topic on Twitter in several counties including Thailand, Vietnam, Singapore, Malaysia, Indonesia, Puerto Rico, Brazil, Japan, India, United States, Mexico, and Peru, and in the Philippines with the hashtag #Still2Gether. On 11 September 2020, after the release of the penultimate and finale episodes, the series became the top trending topic worldwide on Twitter with over two million tweets. A month after the series aired, it garnered over 40 million views on YouTube and 27 million views on LINE TV, one month after its airing.

=== Accolades ===
Year	Award	Category	Recipient	Result	Ref.
2020	Sanook Awards	Thai Song Of The Year	"ยังคู่กัน" ("Yang Khu Kan"): Vachirawit Chivaaree	Won	
2021	Line TV Awards	Best Kiss Scene		Nominated	
2021	Kazz Awards 2021	Imaginary Couple of the Year		Won	
2021	Kazz Awards 2021	Best Actor	Vachirawit Chivaaree	Won	
2021	Kazz Awards 2021	Best Scene		Won	
2021	Kazz Awards 2021	Popular Artist among Teen	Metawin Opas-iamkajorn	Won	
2021	2021 Asia Artist Awards	Asia Celebrity Award for Actor	Vachirawit Chivaaree; Metawin Opas-iamkajorn	Won	
2021	Maya Awards 2021	Best Couple		Nominated	
2021	Maya Awards 2021	Popular Drama Soundtrack	"ยังคู่กัน" ("Yang Khu Kan"): Vachirawit Chivaaree	Nominated	
2021	Thairath Top of the Year 2021	Couple of the Year		Won	
2021	Thailand Asia Dramatic TV Award: Japan	Best Drama		Won	
2021	Tokyo Drama Awards (International Drama Festival)	Special Awards for Foreign Dramas		Won	
