= Astrophile (TV series) =

2022 Thai television series

- Official series poster
- Thai: คืนนับดาว
- Genre: Romance
- Created by: GMMTV; Nuttapong Mongkolsawas
- Based on: Original Story
- Screenplay by: Manow Waneepan Ounphoklang
- Directed by: Koo Ekkasit Trakulkasemsuk
- Starring: Vachirawit Chivaaree; Davika Hoorne; Jumpol Adulkittiporn
- Opening theme: Counting Stars by Gawin Caskey
- Country of origin: Thailand
- Original language: Thai
- No. of seasons: 1
- No. of episodes: 18

Production
- Production location: Thailand
- Running time: 40 minutes
- Production company: GMMTV

Original release
- Network: GMM 25
- Release: 1 June – 3 August 2022

Astrophile (Thai: คืนนับดาว lit. 'Night Counting Star'), starring Davika Hoorne (Mai), Vachirawit Chivaaree (Bright) and Jumpol Adulkittiporn (Off), is a light hearted romantic Thai series about a simple girl who reunites with a junior from her university after a long time; initially, she fails to recognise him. Based on an original plot by pseudonymous writer "Duangmaan", selected through a competition, the series is produced by GMMTV and directed by Koo Ekkasit Trakulkasemsuk. On 1 December 2021, it was announced by GMMTV during the "BORDERLESS" event. The series officially premiered on 1 June 2022 on GMM 25.

== Plot ==
Nubdao (Davika Hoorne), an influencer and a host for a home shopping program, crosses paths with Kimhan (Vachirawit Chivaaree). He instantly remembers her, however she fails to recognise him. Kim maintains secrecy in order to get closer to her. Kim, due to some family circumstances, moves to his friend Pete's place. Later, he finds out his friends house is around Nub's area. At work, Tankhun (Jumpol Adulkittiporn), Nub's friend and a producer of the show, harbours secret feelings for her. During one of the live shows, Nub faces inappropriate actions from her boss Minjun (Patara Eksangkul). Tan and Jaikaew (Jennie Panhan) try to protect her. This goes viral and the audience takes Nub's behaviour differently. In this phase, Nub receives advice from an anonymous follower via Instagram messages.

Kim and his assistant Poi (Kanaphan Puitrakul) manage to get a creative project, which turns out to be in Nub's show. Kim and Nub start to get closer due to their frequent encounters, and Tan begins to get jealous. Meena, Kim's ex-lover, returns to him for support after being abused by her current partner, which makes Nub uneasy. A new coworker Kewalin (Kapook) is hired and makes things unpleasant for Nub, accusing her for bullying and financial misuse.

Amidst all, Kim hides from Nub that he paints under a pseudonym; she admires his art, unaware of his true self. Without Kim's knowledge, Pete pretends to be this painter in front of Nub's friend Nammon and she falls for him. When the truth comes to light, the situation gets complex. Kim tries to sort things between Nub and him.

== Cast and characters ==
=== Main ===
- Davika Hoorne (Mai) as Nubdao

Simple girl working in a show to support her family

- Vachirawit Chivaaree (Bright) as Kimhan

Junior from Nub's University who is also an artist

- Jumpol Adulkittiporn (Off) as Tankhun

Producer of Nub's show who has feelings for her

=== Supporting ===
- Patara Eksangkul (Foei) as Minjun

Nub's toxic boss who treats her inappropriately

- Goy Arachaporn Pokinpakorn as Nammon

Nub's friend

- Nachat Janthapan (Nicky) as Pete

Kim's friend

- Jennie Panhan as Jaikaew

Nub's colleague from the show

- Kanaphan Puitrakul (First) as Poi

Kim's junior assistant

- Phatchara Tubthong (Kapook) as Kewalin

New host who causes troubles for Nub

- Bhasidi Petchsutee (Lookjun) as Alice

Poi's cousin who has crush on Kim

- Phromphiriya Thongputtaruk (Papang) as Saimok

Nub's elder brother

- Jirakit Kuariyakul (Toptap) as Pop

Saimok's love interest

- Leo Saussay as Kit

New producer of the show

- Chitsanupong Sakunnanthiphat (Ace) as Net

Co-worker of Nub

- Rachanee Siralert (Pear) as Kim's mother
- Supranee Jayrinpon (Kai) as Nub's mother
- Phutharit Prombandal (Wit) as Amnuai

Love interest of Nub's mother and has a child, Singto

=== Guest ===
- Pawornwan Verapuchong (Ava) as Meena

Kim's ex

- Yongwaree Anilbol (Fah) as Thankun's neighbor

== Soundtracks ==
Opening title "Counting Stars" is sung by Fluke Gawin launched on 31 May 2022 on GMMTV Records. The lyrics are in Thai and English, composed by Kasidej Hongladaromp & James Alyn Wee.

| Year | Title | Artist | Channel | Ref. |
|---|---|---|---|---|
| 2022 | Counting Stars (นับดาว) | Fluke Gawin | GMMTV Records | |
| 2022 | Just Say You Love Me (สมัยนี้เค้าไม่แอบรัก) | Mook Warranit | GMMTV Records | |

== Production ==
Davika wanted to work with Bright, hence her manager contacted GMMTV. Once the deal was finalised, GMMTV organised an original script writing contest and the winning plot by writer "Duangmaan", is made into the series Astrophile. The shooting of the series started in 2022, after its initial announcement in December 2021. On 1 July 2022, the series aired on GMM TV.

=== International releases ===
Astrophile can be watched on TRUEID, and is available on streaming platform VIU in Thailand, Indonesia, Malaysia, Singapore, Hong Kong, and Myanmar. It premiered on TV Asahi CS TeleAsa Channel 1, Telasa in Japanese Television, Channel 7 in Myanmar and on GMA in the Philippines. Owing to its increasing popularity and viewer's demand, the series got featured on Vidio equipped with Indonesian subtitles.

== Reception ==
In December 2021, the trailer release trended at 2nd in Worldwide, 1st in Thailand, 3rd in Indonesia, 4th in Malaysia, Myanmar, Philippines and 10th in Mexico. Each episode started trending after an initial slow pick-up, and was well received by both local and international audience. The chemistry between the main leads Vachirawit Chivaaree and Davika Hoorne, the compelling storyline resonating with the audiences, further boosted the popularity of the series. It has ranked 1st for "Most Romantic Thai Dramas" and 2nd for "Top Thai Romance Series" to watch online. By November 2023, Astrophile series had over 56M views on its official GMMTV YouTube channel and the pilot episode had over 6M views. Astrophile has attracted a niche market, and it continues to acquire attention and acclaims.

== Viewership ratings and ranking ==
- The orange number represents the lowest viewership ratings and the blue number represents the highest viewership ratings in Thailand.

| Episode | Original Broadcast Date | Title | Average Audience Share | Thailand Trend | Worldwide Trend | Ref. |
|---|---|---|---|---|---|---|
| 1 | June 1, 2022 | We Will See Each Other Again | 0.088% | 1 | 2 | |
| 2 | June 2, 2022 | Reflection | 0.184% | 2 | 8 | |
| 3 | June 8, 2022 | The Judgment | 0.098% | 1 | 2 | |
| 4 | June 9, 2022 | The Distance Between Hearts | 0.047% | 1 | 4 | |
| 5 | June 15, 2022 | The Remnant Of Memory | 0.126% | 1 | 3 | |
| 6 | June 16, 2022 | The Encounter Of Strangers | 0.105% | 1 | 9 | |
| 7 | June 22, 2022 | Parallel Universes | 0.095% | 1 | 7 | |
| 8 | June 23, 2022 | The Truth To Face | 0.069% | 2 | 45 | |
| 9 | June 30, 2022 | 696 Kilometers | 0.217% | 1 | 2 | |
| 10 | July 6, 2022 | Light Of The North Star | 0.116% | 2 | 43 | |
| 11 | July 7, 2022 | Mid Summer Storm | 0.126% | 2 | 48 | |
| 12 | July 13, 2022 | The Differences In Feelings | 0.096% | 2 | 47 | |
| 13 | July 14, 2022 | Guardian Angels | 0.070% | 5 | 48 | |
| 14 | July 20, 2022 | Second Chance | 0.129% | 1 | 4 | |
| 15 | July 21, 2022 | Indented Hearts | 0.155% | 4 | 15 | |
| 16 | July 27, 2022 | Parting To Begin Again | 0.104% | 3 | 45 | |
| 17 | July 28, 2022 | Wish You Were Home | 0.076% | 5 | 42 | |
| 18 | August 3, 2022 | Star & Sun | 0.082% | 1 | 5 | |
| Average | | | 0.110% | —N/a | | |

^1Based on the average audience share per episode.

== Awards and nominations ==
| Year | Award | Actor | Category | Result | Ref. |
|---|---|---|---|---|---|
| 2022 | Asian Academy Creative Award: National Winner 2022 | Jumpol Adulkittiporn | Best Actor in a Supporting Role | Won | |
| 2022 | GQ Men of the Year Awards 2022 (GQ MOTY 2022) | Vachirawit Chivaaree | Actor of the Year | Won | |
| 2023 | Sanook Awards 2022 | Vachirawit Chivaaree | Actor of the Year | Nominated | |
| 2023 | 11th Thailand Social Awards | Davika Hoorne | Best Creator Performance on Social Media | Nominated | |
| 2023 | Komchadluek Awards 2022 | Vachirawit Chivaaree | Most Popular Actor | Won | |
| 2023 | 36th Global Arts and Television Huading Awards | Davika Hoorne | Best Global Teleplay Leading Actress | Won | |
| 2023 | Maya TV Awards 2023 | Vachirawit Chivaaree | Best Male Star of the Year | Nominated | |
| 2023 | Maya TV Awards 2023 | Vachirawit Chivaaree | Charming Young Man of the Year | Nominated | |
| 2023 | Seoul International Drama Awards | Vachirawit Chivaaree | Outstanding Asian Star - Thailand | Nominated | |
