= 2gether: The Movie =

2021 Thai film

- Theatrical release poster
- Directed by: Weerachit Thongjila; Noppanat Chaiwimon; Khanitha Kwanyu
- Based on: Because We Belong Together (เพราะเรา ... คู่กัน) by: JittiRain; 2gether: The series; Still 2gether
- Starring: Metawin Opas-iamkajorn; Vachirawit Chivaaree
- Production companies: The One Enterprise; GMMTV
- Release dates: 4 June 2021 (Japan); 11 November 2021 (Thailand)
- Running time: 107 minutes
- Country: Thailand
- Language: Thai

2gether: The Movie (Thai: เพราะเราคู่กัน The Movie; Phro Rao Khu Kan, lit. 'Because We Belong Together') is a 2021 Thai boys' love-romantic comedy film based on a novel by author JittiRain. It was directed by Weerachit Thongjila, Noppharnach Chaiwimol, and Kanittha Kwanyu and produced by GMMTV with The One Enterprise. The film stars Vachirawit Chivaaree (Bright) and Metawin Opas-iamkajorn (Win).

== Cast ==
- Metawin Opas-iamkajorn (Win) as Tine Teepakorn
- Vachirawit Chivaaree (Bright) as Sarawat Guntithanon
- Korawit Boonsri (Gun) as Green
- Sivakorn Lertchuchot (Guy) as Dim
- Rachanun Mahawan (Film) as Earn
- Pattranite Limpatiyakorn (Love) as Pear
- Thanawat Rattanakitpaisan (Khaotung) as Fong
- Chayakorn Jutamas (JJ) as Ohm
- Chanagun Arpornsutinan (Gunsmile) as Boss
- Chinnarat Siriphongchawalit (Mike) as Man
- Sattabut Laedeke (Drake) as Mil
- Thanatsaran Samthonglai (Frank) as Phukong
- Jirakit Kuariyakul (Toptap) as Type

== Production ==
The international success of 2gether and Still 2gether, led Japanese film distribution companies to approach GMMTV with a film project offer. Originally, the film was supposed to be released on 22 April 2021 in Thailand. However, the release was postponed due to an outbreak of COVID-19 cases within the country. On 4 June 2021, the film premiered in Japan, and later on 11 November 2021, it was released in Thailand. On 11 February 2022, the film was released on the streaming platform Disney+ Hotstar in Thailand.

== Original soundtrack ==
2gether Special Album

Soundtrack album
- Length: 55:40
- Language: Thai
- Label: GMMTV

=== Singles ===
Title	Artist	Released	Ref.
"Ten Years Later"	Metawin Opas-iamkajorn	March 30, 2021	
"One Hug (กอดที)"	Vachirawit Chivaaree	October 1, 2021	

=== Special album ===
Title	Writer	Artist	Length	Ref.
"Tit Gup (Stuck On You)"	Anan Puaniran; Panthawat Sathvilai; Patchara Rattanarun	Max Jenmana	03:32	
"Kan Goo"	อัจฉริยา ดุลยไพบูลย์	Bright Vachirawit	04:05	
"Tok Long Chan Kid Pai Aeng Chai Mai (ตกลงฉันคิดไปเองใช่ไหม)"	อัจฉริยา ดุลยไพบูลย์	Bright Vachirawit	04:08	
"Yang Koo Gun (Still Together)"	อัจฉริยา ดุลยไพบูลย์	Bright Vachirawit Ft. Win Metawin	03:59	
"Kon Nun Tong Pen Tur"	อัจฉริยา ดุลยไพบูลย์	Win Metawin	04:19	
"Ten Years Later"	อัจฉริยา ดุลยไพบูลย์	Win Metawin	03:33	
"Kod Tee (One Hug)"	อัจฉริยา ดุลยไพบูลย์	Bright Vachirawit	04:15	
"Tit Gup (Stuck On You)"	(Instrumental)	—N/a	03:32	
"Kan Goo"	(Instrumental)	—N/a	04:05	
"Tok Long Chan Kid Pai Aeng Chai Mai"	(Instrumental)	—N/a	04:08	
"Yang Koo Gun (Still Together)"	(Instrumental)	—N/a	03:59	
"Kon Nun Tong Pen Tur"	(Instrumental)	—N/a	04:19	
"Ten Years Later"	(Instrumental)	—N/a	03:33	
"Kod Tee (One Hug)"	(Instrumental)	—N/a	04:13	
Total Length			55:40	

== Reception ==
In 2021, the movie premiered in 30 cinemas across Tokyo, Japan; citing overwhelmingly positive response, the studio expanded the release to 100 theaters. The Japanese release of the 2gether: Special Music album, from Spotify and Line Music, received a warm reception. It debuted 3rd on Oricon Daily Album Charts, 7th on Oricon Weekly Album Charts, and 4th on Billboard Japan Weekly Album Sales.

== Awards and nominations ==
Year	Award	Category	Recipient	Result	Ref.
2021	Thailand Actors Award in Japan	Best Actor	Bright Vachirawit	Won	
2021	Thailand Actors Award in Japan	Best Couple	Bright Vachirawit and Win Metawin	Won	
