= Man in Love (2014 film) =

- Theatrical poster
- Directed by: Han Dong-wook
- Written by: Yu Gap-yeol
- Produced by: Han Jae-duk; Kim Yoon-ho
- Starring: Hwang Jung-min; Han Hye-jin; Kwak Do-won; Jung Man-sik; Kim Hye-eun
- Cinematography: Yu Eok
- Edited by: Kim Sang-bum; Kim Jae-bum
- Music by: Hwang Sang-jun
- Distributed by: Next Entertainment World
- Release date: January 22, 2014
- Running time: 122 minutes
- Country: South Korea
- Language: Korean
- Box office: US$13.6 million

Man in Love (Korean: 남자가 사랑할 때; RR: Namjaga saranghal ttae; lit. 'When a Man Is in Love') is a 2014 South Korean drama film about a terminally ill gangster who falls in love for the first, and likely last, time. It stars Hwang Jung-min and Han Hye-jin. It was remade in Taiwan with the same name in 2021. It was also adapted into the Thai film Love You to Debt in 2024.

== Plot ==
Tae-il is a low-level thug who goes around the streets of his neighborhood in Gunsan, collecting debts for a loan shark and harassing shop owners for the protection money owed to the small gang he works for. He is 42 years old, lives with his barber brother Young-il and Young-il's family, and has never been in love. Tae-il does well at his job and doesn't seem to harbor many scruples about it, but then he meets Ho-jung, a bank clerk who is taking care of her debt-ridden, terminally ill father. During their first encounter, Tae-il forces her to sign a contract that requires her to sell her organs if she can't pay back her father's debt on time. After their not-so-pleasant first meeting, however, Tae-il finds himself thinking about Ho-jung constantly and his conscience begins to get the better of him. He writes a new contract and offers it to her: He will exempt her from the debt if she goes on date with him. The more dates she goes on, the less debt she will have to pay off. Ho-jung rejects his offer at first, but knowing that she is unable to make the payments at any cost, she reluctantly agrees. As they start to go on awkward "dates," an unlikely romance blossoms between the two. Following his prolonged courtship, Tae-il tries to leave the gang life behind him, but the break isn't clean. Unfortunately he is soon diagnosed with cancer and his relationship with Ho-jung is suddenly thrown into jeopardy.

== Cast ==
- Hwang Jung-min as Han Tae-il
- Han Hye-jin as Joo Ho-jung
- Kwak Do-won as Han Young-il, Tae-il's brother
- Jung Man-sik as Doo-chul
- Kim Hye-eun as Mi-young, Young-il's wife
- Nam Il-woo as Tae-il's father
- Kang Min-ah as Song-ji, Young-il's daughter
- Kim Hong-pa as Mr. Park from the health care center
- Hwang Byeong-guk as Yang
- Kim Byung-ok as Pastor
- Nam Moon-chul as Detective Jo
- Choi Woo-ri as Mi-sun, bargirl
- Son Se-bin as Hye-kyung, Ho-jung's co-worker
- Park Ji-hwan as "Gold teeth"
- Park Sung-woong as barbershop customer (cameo)
- Park Na-rim as radio DJ (cameo)
