= Love You to Debt =

2024 Thai romance action film

- Teaser poster as 'The Interest'
- สินเชื่อ..รักแลกเงิน
- Directed by: Waasuthep Ketpetch
- Screenplay by: Methus Sirinawin
- Based on: Man in Love by Han Dong-wook and Yu Gap-yeol
- Produced by: GMMTV; Parbdee Taweesuk
- Starring: Vachirawit Chivaaree; Urassaya Sperbund
- Cinematography: Wongwattana Chunhavuttiyano
- Distributed by: Netflix; GDH 559
- Release date: 25 April 2024
- Running time: 135 minutes
- Country: Thailand
- Language: Thai

Love You to Debt (Thai: สินเชื่อ..รักแลกเงิน) formerly The Interest (Thai: ผ่อนรักนอกระบบ), is a 2024 romance action Thai film starring Vachirawit Chivaaree and Urassaya Sperbund. Directed by Waasuthep Ketpetch and produced by Parbdee Taweesuk, this movie is an official remake of Han Dong-wook's 2014 South Korean film Man in Love. The story is about a debt collector who falls in love with a woman struggling to take care of her ailing father due to financial issues. It was released on 25 April 2024 in Thailand. The popularity led the movie release in many countries, including Paris. It released on online streaming platform Netflix, ranked first place in 'Top 10 Thai Films'

== Plot ==
A low-level debt collector (Vachirawit Chivaaree) goes around the neighborhood streets harassing shop owners and collecting debts for the loan shark he works for. He encounters a simple woman (Urassaya Sperbund) struggling to take care of her ailing father and his hospital bills. She has a huge debt, so he strikes a deal with her to repay it, asking a favor to date him in return. He eventually falls in love with her, but later discovers that he has a terminal illness.

== Cast and characters ==
=== Main ===
- Vachirawit Chivaaree (Bright) as Bo

Debt Collector

- Urassaya Sperbund (Yaya) as Im

Girl taking care of her ailing father

=== Supporting ===
- Pornchita Na Songkhla (Benz) as Wan
- Niti Chaichitathorn (Pompam) as Richy
- Thanaboon Kiatniran (Aou) as Pad
- Wongsakorn Rassamitat as Boon (Bo's father)
- Watchara Pan-Iam (Jaeb) as Odd
- D Gerrard as Prasit
- Pakpoom Jongmanwattana (Aun) as Ek

=== Other casts ===
- Wanwimol Jaenasavamethee (June)
- Kathaleeya McIntosh (Mam)
- Songsit Roongnophakunsri (Kob)
- Sarut Vichitrananda (Big)

== Production ==
=== Development ===
On 22 November 2022, GMMTV introduced the film during their "Diversely Yours" event at Union Hall Bangkok. The trailer which was shot within a day at Pattaya, received a positive response.

This movie is a joint production with Parbdee Thaweesuk, a quality production team, along with Waasuthep Ketpetch from The Gifted Graduation series as director.

Previously, Sataporn Panichraksapong, managing director of GMMTV announced that their parent company The One Enterprise will invest 51% stake in Parbdee Thaweesuk Co. Ltd. to extend its business model. The expectation is to build potential, to create quality series/films and improve Thai markets visibility around the globe. Producers Kamthorn Lorjitramnuay, Puchong Tuntisungwaragul, and Patha Thongpan represent Parbdee Taweesuk.

=== Filming ===
On 11 July 2023, the shooting finally commenced in Pattaya, Thailand, after a pre-production phase of countless meetings, script revisions, location scouting, casting sessions, meticulous planning, assembling a talented cast and crew. Bright Vachirawit was trained by the Panna Stunt Academy, rigorous practice got involved in creating dynamic and impactful action sequences. In October 2023, the final shooting got wrapped. On 17 October, the official trailer of the movie was released.

== Soundtrack ==
The song "Forever Blue" by Arch Tremors ft. Lollo Gardtman is played in the first trailer released in 2022. The original song "Na Na Thong" was sung by Joey Phuwasit.

Title	Artist	Channel	Length
"Na Na Thong"	Vachirawit Chivaaree	GMMTV	4:06

== Reception ==
Love You to Debt became one of the most anticipated movie in 2024. On 22 April 2024, the premiere of the movie for delegates was held in Siam Paragon, Bangkok and the performance of the lead were applauded. The movie has received positive responses from the public post theatre release. Citing positive response, the production house expanded the release in many countries outside Thailand which includes Laos, Cambodia, Malaysia, Paris, Taiwan, Indonesia, Hong Kong, Macau and Korea.

On 27 May 2024, The Department of International Trade Promotion (DITP), Ministry of Commerce, Royal Thai Government, in collaboration with the Royal Thai Embassy have presented Love You to Debt on 'Thai Movie Day' in Paris at Publicis Cinémas on Champs-Élysées. On 29 August 2024, the movie got online released on Netflix. It ranked 1st in Thailand, 5th in Malaysia, 7th in Indonesia, 8th in Singapore and trended under Top 40 in worldwide ranking. The movie topped Netflix Thailand chart.

In 2024, Love You to Debt became highest grossing Thai movie on its first weekend earning ฿9.6M, 5th in highest income generating and highest grossing film under GMMTV production. In May 2024, special screening for fans on demand was held at Cosmos Bazaar, Bangkok. Film critics acclaimed the cinematography, set up in Pattaya and acting of the artists rating it 8.9/10 overall. In addition, on the first day of its release in Thailand, it received a high score of 9.6 from the audience on the movie rating website IMDb.

Spring News praised stating that "The film does a good job in exposing the problems of informal debt, gambling, darkness of the underground world, human tricks and the poverty of the marginalized society". NaewNa newspaper rated 8/10 stating that "The production, editing, script, actors and soundtrack were well-rounded and fun to watch". Mano Wanavelusit from BearTai Hi-Tech rated 6.3/10 stating that the script adapted to suit Thai context making it relatable like Alcazar, Muay Thai and the elephant show at Nong Nooch Garden, highlighted that the screenplay could be more effective, however overall appreciated the leads performance.

== Awards and nominations ==
Year	Award	Category	Receipents	Result	Ref.
2024	Asian Academy Creative Awards	Best Picture Film (National Winner)	Love You to Debt	Won	
2025	Kom Chad Luek Awards	Best Actress	Urassaya Sperbund	Nominated	
2025	Sanook Awards	Best Movie of the Year	Love You to Debt	Nominated	
2025	Thailand Box Office Awards	Film of the Year	Love You to Debt	Nominated	
2025	Thailand Box Office Awards	Director of the Year	Waasuthep Ketpetch	Nominated	
2025	Thailand Box Office Awards	Actor of the Year	Vachirawit Chivaaree	Nominated	
2025	Thailand Box Office Awards	Actress of the Year	Urassaya Sperbund	Nominated	
2025	Thailand Box Office Awards	Supporting Actress of the Year	Pornchita Na Songkhla	Nominated	
2025	Thailand Box Office Awards	Soundtrack of the Year	Love You to Debt	Nominated	
2025	TrustGu Thai Film Awards	Best Actress	Urassaya Sperbund	Nominated	
2025	TrustGu Thai Film Awards	Best Supporting Actress	Pornchita Na Songkhla	Nominated	
2025	Suphannahong National Film Awards	Best Actress	Urassaya Sperbund	Nominated	
