= Joox =

Streaming music service developed by Tencent

- Website type: Music streaming
- Available in: English, Traditional Chinese, Simplified Chinese, Burmese, Indonesian, Malay, Thai
- Founded: January 2015; 11 years ago
- Headquarters: Guangdong
- Owner: Tencent Music
- Industry: Music, podcast, and video
- Website: www.joox.com www.joox.co.za

Joox (stylised in all caps) is a music streaming service owned by Tencent, launched in January 2015. Joox is the biggest music streaming app in Asian markets such as Hong Kong, Macau, Indonesia, Malaysia, Myanmar, Thailand and also in South Africa before it was shut down in early 2022. Joox is a freemium service, providing most of its songs free, while some songs are only available for premium users, offered via paid subscriptions or by doing different tasks offered.

In 2017, Joox launched their service in their first non-Asian market, South Africa, which for an unknown reason shut down five years later. The service now accounts for more than 50% of all music streaming app downloads in their Asian markets. The number of music-streaming users in Hong Kong, Macau, Malaysia, Thailand, Myanmar and Indonesia was expected to reach 87 million by 2020.

== Background ==
Before the emergence of Joox, Tencent owned QQ Music, one of the largest music streaming and download service in China. In 2015, they introduced Joox as their expansion of music services to overseas market instead of mainland China, starting first in Hong Kong.

Instead of providing free services by playing audio ads to users like Spotify, another major music service, Joox focused on banner ads, splash ads and other advertising methods such as category playlists and in-app skins. They claimed it as a success. Joox offered their premium VIP access to DStv subscribers free of charge. DStv is the sister company to Tencent and is the primary pay-TV provider in South Africa. In November 2021, it was announced that Joox will stop streaming in South Africa in March 2022.

== See also ==
- QQ Music - Tencent's China market music service
