= Kanyarat Ruangrung =

Thai actress (born 2000)

- กัญญรัตน์ เรืองรุ่ง
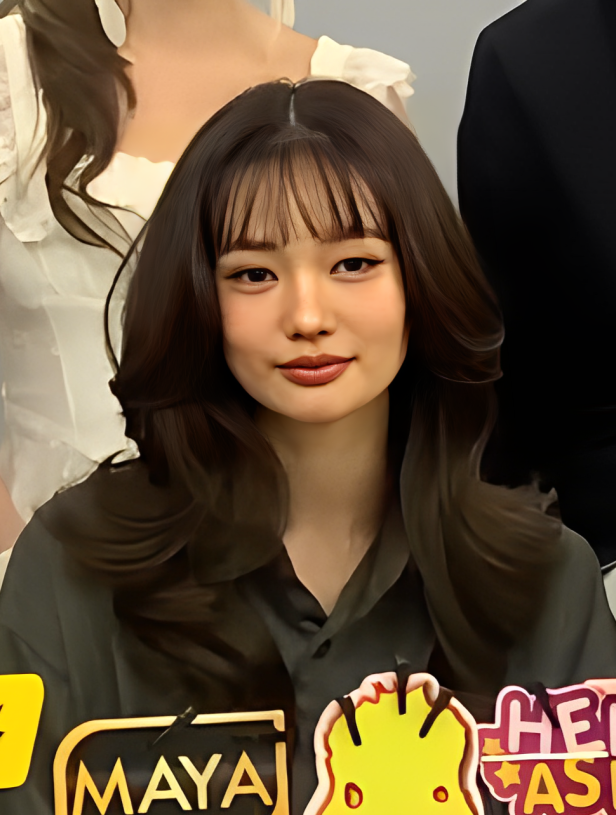
- Kanyarat in June 2025
- Born: 5 November 2000 (age 25); Thailand
- Other name: Piploy (พิพลอย)
- Education: Bangkok University
- Occupation: Actress
- Years active: 2019–present
- Agent: GMMTV
- Known for: Jaya Janiya (aged 15 years old) in 55:15 Never Too Late; Ba-Mhee in The Trainee; Noey in Whale Store xoxo; Chatfah in Hide & Sis
- Height: 166 cm (5 ft 5 1/2 in)

Kanyarat Ruangrung (Thai: กัญญรัตน์ เรืองรุ่ง, RTGS: Kanyarat Rueangrung; born 5 November 2000), nicknamed Piploy (Thai: พิพลอย) or Ploy (Thai: พลอย; lit. 'Gemstone'), is a Thai actress. She first gained recognition for her performances in several television series, notably as Soda in The Shipper (2020) and as 15-year-old Jaya Janiya in 55:15 Never Too Late (2021). She is also known for her sapphic roles in the television series The Trainee (2024) and Whale Store xoxo (2025). For her portrayal of Chatfah in the 2025 mystery thriller drama television series Hide & Sis, she won the Asian Academy Creative Award for Best Actress in a Supporting Role for the Thailand region and received a nomination at the 30th Asian Television Awards in 2025.

== Education ==
Kanyarat completed her secondary education at Valaya Alongkorn Rajabhat University Demonstration School. She then attended Bangkok University's School of Fine and Applied Arts, majoring in Communication Design.

== Career ==
Kanyarat entered the entertainment industry after finishing as second runner-up in Miss Teen Thailand 2018. She subsequently signed with GMMTV, making her acting debut as Laila in the 2019 television series Blacklist.

In 2020, she appeared in the romantic fantasy drama Angel Beside Me and played Soda, a yaoi writer along with Sureeyares Yakares in The Shipper (2020). Following appearances in A Tale of Thousand Stars and Put Your Head on My Shoulder, she landed her first main role as the 15-year-old former pop singer Jaya Janiya in the coming of age science fiction television series 55:15 Never Too Late.

Her career expanded over the next few years with supporting and starring roles in projects such as Devil Sister (2022), Vice Versa (2023), Return Man (2023), and Enigma, alongside a main role in the ensemble series Wednesday Club.

In 2024, she appeared as Mew in Ploy's Yearbook and played Ba-Mhee, an account executive trainee caught between her boyfriend Tae (Tawinan Anukoolprasert) and her mentor Judy (Ploynira Hiruntaveesin), in The Trainee. She subsequently starred as Brink in Perfect 10 Liners (2024) and Khao in Break Up Service (2025).

In 2025, Kanyarat starred in the Thai girls' love television series Whale Store xoxo as Noey, a young woman harboring secret feelings for her best friend Wan (Pansa Vosbein). That same year, she gained critical acclaim for playing Chatfah, the youngest sister of the Bupphachinda family in the mystery thriller television series Hide & Sis (2025).

== Personal life ==
In March 2026, when asked by a fan on Instagram about her sexual orientation, Kanyarat publicly stated that she identifies as queer and is open to romantic relationships regardless of gender.

== Filmography ==
=== Television series ===
Key
†	Denotes television productions that have not yet been released

Year	Title	Role	Notes	Ref.
2019	Blacklist	Laila	Supporting role	
2020	Angel Beside Me	Lin's friend	Guest role	
2020	The Shipper	Soda	Supporting role	
2021	A Tale of Thousand Stars	woman in the pub	Guest role	
2021	Put Your Head on My Shoulder	Kwang	Supporting role	
2021	55:15 Never Too Late	Jaya Janiya (aged 15 years old)	Main role	
2022	Devil Sister	Ink	Supporting role	
2022	Vice Versa	Gyo	Supporting role	
2023	Return Man	Honey	Supporting role	
2023	Enigma	Namsine	Supporting role	
2023	Wednesday Club	May	Main role	
2024	Ploy's Yearbook	Mew	Supporting role	
2024	The Trainee	Ba-Mhee	Supporting role	
2024	Perfect 10 Liners	Brink	Guest role	
2025	Break Up Service	Khao	Guest role	
2025	Whale Store xoxo	Noey	Supporting role	
2025	Hide & Sis	Chatfah	Main role	
2025	MuTeLuv: Fist Foot Fusion	Lipsync	Supporting role	
2026	Lovers & Gangsters	Kradat	Supporting role	
TBA	Ditto †	Anya	Supporting role	
TBA	My Beautiful Enemy †	TBA	Supporting role	
TBA	Safety Flirt †	Ama	Supporting role	
TBA	Vamp Eternal Destiny †	TBA	TBA	

=== Music video appearances ===
Year	Title	Artist	Ref.
2020	"แคร์ไกลไกล" (The Shipper OST)	La-Ong-Fong	
2020	"แค่อีกครั้ง" (Better Man)	Pattadon Janngeon (Fiat)	
2021	"Why?"	Thanat Lowkhunsombat (Lee)	

== Awards and nominations ==
Year	Award	Category	Work	Result	Reference
2025	Asian Academy Creative Awards	Best Actress in a Supporting Role; National Winner	Hide & Sis	Won	
2025	Asian Academy Creative Awards	Best Actress in a Supporting Role	Hide & Sis	Nominated	
2025	30th Asian Television Awards	Best Actress in a Supporting Role	Hide & Sis	Nominated	
