= Jitaboon Ngamboonyarak =

Thai actor and model

Saengnuea Jitaboon Ngamboonyarak
- แสงเหนือ จิตบุณย์ งามบุณยรักษ์
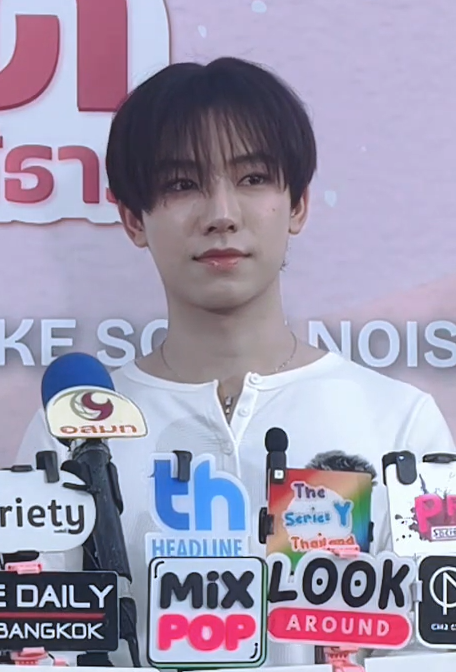
- Saengnuea in 2026
- Born: Papawit Ngamboonyarak; May 3, 2000 (age 26); Thailand
- Other name: Poonpun Jitaboon Ngamboonyarak
- Education: University of Phayao
- Occupations: Actor; Model
- Known for: Dinosaur Love; Your Dear Daddy

Jitaboon Ngamboonyarak (Thai: แสงเหนือ จิตบุณย์ งามบุณยรักษ์; born Papawit Ngamboonyarak (ปภาวิชญ์ งามบุณยรักษ์); 3 May 2000), professionally known as Saengnuea, is a Thai actor and model. He is best known for portraying Seekhram in the television series Dinosaur Love (2023), broadcast on Amarin TV and iQIYI, and Saithan in Your Dear Daddy (2026), broadcast on MCOT.

== Biography and career ==
Saengnuea Jitaboon Ngamboonyarak was born on 3 May 2000 in Thailand. Before adopting the stage name Saengnuea, he was known by the nickname Poonpun. He completed his primary education at Ban Don School (Sri Serm Kasikorn) and his secondary education at Strisrinan School. He later graduated with a degree in Cosmetic Sciences from the School of Pharmaceutical Sciences at the University of Phayao.

Before making his acting debut, he worked as a model and appeared in advertising campaigns, including promotions for the Samsung Galaxy Z Flip4 and a public awareness campaign by the Thai Health Promotion Foundation (ThaiHealth).

In 2023, he made his television debut as Seekhram in the BL series Dinosaur Love, which aired on Amarin TV and iQIYI. In 2024, he was announced as the lead actor of the BL series Your Dear Daddy, portraying Saithan. He was officially paired with actor Pusit Dittapisit (Fluke), while Nannakun Pakapatpornpob (Ta) portrayed the character during an earlier stage of the story.

== Filmography ==
=== Television ===
Year	Title	Role	Network / Platform	Ref.
2023	Dinosaur Love	Seekhram	Amarin TV iQIYI	
2026	Your Dear Daddy	Saithan	MCOT iQIYI	

=== Television specials ===
Year	Title	Role	Platform	Ref.
2026	Your Dear Daddy Special	Himself	iQIYI	

=== Television programs ===
Year	Title	Role	Network	Ref.
2026	เรียกแด๊ดมาเล่น (Come Play, Dear Daddy)	Himself	MCOT	

=== Music videos ===
Year	Title	Artist	Role	Ref.
2026	"Be Yours" (ฉันจะเป็นของเธอเสมอ)	Dome Jaruwat	Appears in the music video	
2026	"อาการรัก × ให้รักมันโตในใจ"	Pusit Dittapisit (Fluke) & Saengnuea Jitaboon	Vocals and music video	
2026	"My Trigonelline – Can't Resist Your Scent" (แพ้เธอ)	Tommy Tee feat. TEE JETS	Lead actor in the music video	

=== Live performances ===
Date	Song	Event	Ref.
28 April 2026	"Be Yours" (ฉันจะเป็นของเธอเสมอ)	Your Dear Daddy Press Conference	

== Events ==
Date	Event	Venue	Ref.
29 May 2023	Dinosaur Love Launch Event (Amarin Expo 2023)	Queen Sirikit National Convention Center, Bangkok, Thailand	
2024	Your Dear Daddy Press Conference & Pilot Screening	ICONSIAM PARK, Thailand	
23 April 2026	เรียกแด๊ดกลับไร่ (Call Daddy Back to the Farm)	Discover Plaza, Siam Discovery, Bangkok, Thailand	
May 2026	เรียกแด๊ด ชวนมาดู (Exclusive EP.1 Screening)	Bangkok, Thailand	
27 June 2026	Your Dear Daddy Final Episode	One Ultra Screens, One Bangkok, Bangkok, Thailand	
