= 55:15 Never Too Late =

2021–22 Thai television series

- Official series poster
- Genre: Coming of age; Sci-fi; Fiction
- Directed by: Saranyu Jiralaksanakul
- Starring: Korapat Kirdpan; Kanyarat Ruangrung; Thanawat Rattanakitpaisan; Kay Lertsittichai; Benyapa Jeenprasom; Vasu Sangsingkeo; Sinjai Plengpanich; Songsit Roongnophakunsri; Amarin Nitibhon; Kara Polasit
- Opening theme: "Never Too Late" by Thanawat Rattanakitpaisan
- Ending theme: "ถ้าวันนั้น (If Only)" by Arun Asawasuebsakul
- Country of origin: Thailand
- Original language: Thai
- No. of seasons: 1
- No. of episodes: 16

Production
- Production company: GMMTV

Original release
- Network: Disney+ Hotstar
- Release: 6 December 2021 – 24 January 2022
- Network: GMM 25
- Release: 5 January – 24 January 2022

55:15 Never Too Late is a 2021 Thai television series starring Korapat Kirdpan (Nanon), Kanyarat Ruangrung (Piploy), Thanawat Rattanakitpaisan (Khaotung), Kay Lertsittichai, Benyapa Jeenprasom (View), Vasu Sangsingkeo (Jeep), Sinjai Plengpanich (Nok), Songsit Roongnophakunsri (Kob), Amarin Nitibhon and Kara Polasit.

Directed by Saranyu Jiralaksanakul, produced by Thai company GMMTV and distributed exclusively by Disney+ Hotstar for the first time, this series is one of the sixteen television series of the aforementioned production company for 2021 during their "GMMTV 2021: The New Decade Begins" event on 3 December 2020. The series premiered on Hotstar on 6 December 2021 meanwhile, it will premiered on GMM 25 on 5 January 2022 airing every Wednesdays and Thursdays at 20:30 ICT (8:30 pm) replacing Baker Boys' timeslot on GMM25. The official trailer of the series was released on 25 November 2021 by GMMTV, along with its official main casts and characters.

== Synopsis ==
'55:15 Never Too Late' follows 5 characters, aged 55, who wake up one day as their 15 year old selves. San, a professional voice actor; Jaya, a popular singer who gained popularity during the 1980s; Paul, owner of a bar; Amonthep a former boxer who now owns a boxing ring center, and Jarunee, a high school teacher. The five characters have a second chance to pursue their dreams and aspirations by redoing their lives at the age of 15.

Will the five figure out what turned them back to 15 years old? and will they change back to 55?

== Casts and characters ==
=== Main ===
- Korapat Kirdpan (Nanon) as San
  - Vasu Sangsingkeo (Jeep) as adult San
- Kanyarat Ruangrung (Piploy) as Jaya
  - Sinjai Plengpanich (Nok) as adult Jaya
- Thanawat Rattanakitpaisan (Khaotung) as Songpol
  - Songsit Roongnophakunsri (Kob) as adult Songpol
- Kay Lertsittichai as Amornthep
  - Amarin Nitibhon as adult Amornthep
- Benyapa Jeenprasom (View) as Jarunee
  - Kara Polasit as adult Jarunee

=== Supporting ===
- Grace Mahadumrongkul as adult Prim
- Krissana Sreadthatamrong (Tu)
- Anusorn Maneeted (Yong) as Mathee
- Luckana Siriwong (Bim)
- Anuwan Jiranantawat
- Michael Shaowanasai
- Pahun Jiyacharoen (Marc) as Pruek
- Weerayut Chansook (Arm) as Bomb
- Tawinan Anukoolprasert (Sea) as Pangpond
- Pawin Kulkaranyawich (Win) as Pipu
- Sureeyares Yakares (Pringkhing) as Noinae
- Preeyaphat Lawsuwansiri (Earn) as Joom
- Natthisarat Phongphanumaspaisarn (Mind)
- Napasorn Weerayuttvilai (Puimek) as younger Prim
- Praekwan Phongskul (Bimbeam) as Kiki
- Natthachai Sirinanthachot (Birth)

=== Guest ===
- Sahaphap Wongratch (Mix) as Himself
- Pirapat Watthanasetsiri (Earth) as Himself

== Soundtracks ==
Song title (Official Spelling)	Romanized title (RTGS)	English title	Artist	Ref.
Never Too Late	—N/a	"Never Too Late"	Thanawat Rattanakitpaisan (Khaotung)	
ถ้าวันนั้น	Thawannan	"If Only"	Arun Asawasuebsakul (Ford)	

== Reception ==
=== Thailand television ratings ===
- In the table below, the blue number represents the lowest ratings and the red number represents the highest ratings.

Episode No.	Timeslot (UTC+07:00)	Air date	Average audience share	Ref.
1	Wednesdays, Thursdays 8:30pm	5 January 2022		
2	Wednesdays, Thursdays 8:30pm	6 January 2022		
3	Wednesdays, Thursdays 8:30pm	12 January 2022		
4	Wednesdays, Thursdays 8:30pm	13 January 2022		
5	Wednesdays, Thursdays 8:30pm	19 January 2022		
6	Wednesdays, Thursdays 8:30pm	20 January 2022		
7	Wednesdays, Thursdays 8:30pm	26 January 2022	0.044%	
8	Wednesdays, Thursdays 8:30pm	27 January 2022	0.049%	
9	Wednesdays, Thursdays 8:30pm	2 February 2022	0.075%	
10	Wednesdays, Thursdays 8:30pm	3 February 2022	0.115%	
11	Wednesdays, Thursdays 8:30pm	9 February 2022	0.076%	
12	Wednesdays, Thursdays 8:30pm	10 February 2022	0.053%	
13	Wednesdays, Thursdays 8:30pm	16 February 2022	0.043%	
14	Wednesdays, Thursdays 8:30pm	17 February 2022	0.033%	
15	Wednesdays, Thursdays 8:30pm	23 February 2022	0.042%	
16	Wednesdays, Thursdays 8:30pm	24 February 2022	0.064%	
Average			0.059% ^{1}	

^1 Based on the average audience share per episode.
