= I'm Tee, Me Too =

2020 Thai television series

- Official series poster
- Thai: คนละทีเดียวกัน – I'm Tee, Me Too
- Genre: Slice of life; Comedy
- Created by: GMMTV
- Directed by: Nuttapong Mongkolsawas
- Starring: Atthaphan Phunsawat; Perawat Sangpotirat; Prachaya Ruangroj; Tawan Vihokratana; Jumpol Adulkittiporn; Thitipoom Techaapaikhun
- Country of origin: Thailand
- Original language: Thai
- No. of episodes: 8

Production
- Production company: GMMTV

Original release
- Network: GMM 25; AIS Play
- Release: 18 September – 6 November 2020

Related
- Our Skyy

I'm Tee, Me Too (Thai: คนละทีเดียวกัน – I'm Tee, Me Too; Khon la thi diao kan: I'm Tee, Me Too; lit. "Different People - I'm Tee, Me Too") is a 2020 Thai television series starring Atthaphan Phunsawat (Gun), Perawat Sangpotirat (Krist), Prachaya Ruangroj (Singto), Tawan Vihokratana (Tay), Jumpol Adulkittiporn (Off) and Thitipoom Techaapaikhun (New). The series follows an orphaned young man who rents out his house to five others who share the same nickname (Note: Although all containing the phonetically identical "tee (/tʰiː/)", the names of the main characters have distinct meanings: T-Rex/ทีเร็กซ์ (/tʰiː rék/): Tyrannosaurus, one of the best-known dinosaurs. It is a slight twist from T-Rex's original nickname Tee Lek/ตี๋เล็ก (/tǐː lék/) which he used until middle school. Lek/เล็ก literally means "little, small". The meaning of Tee Lek immediately makes Maetee think T-Rex is the youngest child in his family (Ep. 1).; Watee/วาที (/waː tʰiː/): "A talker, a speaker, an indicator", as introduced by T-Rex in Ep. 1.; Maitee/ไม้ที (/máj tʰiː/): T-square, a drawing and also measuring instrument. Maitee is seen using a long ruler to measure food when his name is introduced in Ep. 1, and he is introduced as the "strictest in this house".; Tee-do/ทีโด๊ (/tʰiː dóː/): The two consecutive musical notes B4 and C5. Coined in Ep. 1 by Tee-do, who proposed B4, T-Rex, who followed with C5, and Watee, who joined the two together.; Maetee/เมธี (/meː tʰiː/): Learned man; sage. He is introduced as "a top scriptwriter" from his faculty.; Teedet/ทีเด็ด (/tʰiː dèt/): Good strategy.) as his but have starkly different personalities.

Directed by Nuttapong Mongkolsawas and produced by GMMTV, the series was one of the two television series launched by GMMTV together with AIS Play on 8 July 2020. It premiered on GMM 25 and AIS Play on 18 September 2020, airing on Fridays at 21:30 ICT. The series concluded on 6 November 2020 and replaced by Tonhon Chonlatee on its timeslot on GMM25. The series had an rerun from 23 October to 14 November 2021 every Saturdays and Sundays at 20:30 (8:30 pm) on GMM25 replacing the Saturday and Sunday rerun of Fish upon the Sky in its timeslot. It was succeeded by the reruns of Our Skyy in its timeslot.

== Synopsis ==
After his mom died, college student Watee a.k.a. "Tee" (Perawat Sangpotirat) has to find a way to keep the house. He then decides to rent out its rooms and ends up living with five individuals who, like him, are all nicknamed "Tee" — T-Rex (Atthaphan Phunsawat), Maitee (Prachaya Ruangroj), Tee-Do (Tawan Vihokratana), Maetee (Jumpol Adulkittiporn) and Teedet (Thitipoom Techaapaikhun). Soon, Watee and the five boarders have to deal with their different fears and eccentricities.

== Cast and characters ==
Below are the cast of the series:

=== Main ===
- Atthaphan Phunsawat (Gun) as Watee Reuangritthiroj (T-Rex)

A psychology student who is one of the five boarders in Watee's house; the series' narrator. T-Rex came to live in Watee's house due to his fear of living alone and out of his curiosity of knowing he is Watee's namesake. He later discovers that Watee is his half-brother.

- Perawat Sangpotirat (Krist) as Watee Reuangritthiroj

An architecture student who owns a house near the university. Watee lives alone in his house since his mom's death, and is reserved and overly suspicious of everything. When he learns that the bank will take the house due to his late mother's unpaid mortgages, he resolves to rent out its rooms. Soon, he ends up having five boarders who are all nicknamed "Tee". He is later identified as T-Rex's half-brother and the original "Watee Reuangritthiroj."

- Prachaya Ruangroj (Singto) as Maitee

A food science student who is the eldest of the five boarders in Watee's house. Maitee loves to cook and is very by the book. He has a strange phobia — being scared of good news. He is later revealed as Watee's childhood friend.

- Tawan Vihokratana (Tay) as Tee-Do

A music student who is one of the five boarders in Watee's house. Teedo is overly sensitive to the sound of chewing. He cannot bear listening to even the relatively quieter chewing noises that he has to put headphones on during meals.

- Jumpol Adulkittiporn (Off) as Maetee

A communication arts student who is one of the five boarders in Watee's house. Maetee is an imaginative and overly delusional scriptwriter who is extremely scared of ghosts.

- Thitipoom Techaapaikhun (New) as Teeradech Jutikasem (Teedet)

A forestry student who is one of the five boarders in Watee's house. Foul-mouthed and straightforward, Teedet busies himself with exercising and taking care of the plants in and around the house. He is very scared of beautiful women that he faints if he sees one.

=== Supporting ===
- Lapisara Intarasut (Apple) as Soundlab

Tee-Do's new love interest after breaking up with Ink.

- Rachanun Mahawan (Film) as Looksorn Thanyawan (Sorn)

A girl introduced by T-Rex and Maetee in a bid to cure Teedet's fear of beautiful women; T-Rex's friend and Teedet's love interest.

- Narumon Phongsupan (Koy) as Ple

Maitee's mother

- Angsana Buranon (Muay) as the identical twin sisters Ploy and Pim

- Ploy: Watee's late mother. Ploy was Tin's wife who raised Watee alone after Tin lost his memories and lived a new life.
- Pim: Watee's aunt. Pim was mistaken by Maetee to be the ghost of the late Ploy when Maetee was home-alone and she came to the house unannounced.

- Khunakorn Kirdpan as Watin Reuangritthiroj (Tin)

T-Rex's father. Tin is later revealed to be also Watee's father and the late Ploy's husband. He lost his memories of Ploy after a car accident and began living a new life with his second wife (T-Rex's mother). He named his second son T-Rex with Watee's name, leading to T-Rex and Watee becoming namesakes of each other.

- Sumontha Suanpholaat (Jum) as Maetee's mother

=== Guest ===
- Chanya McClory (Nink) as Ink (Ep. 1)

Tee-Do and Maitee's ex-girlfriend.

- Thanaset Suriyapornchaikul (Euro) as a young Teedet (Ep. 5)
- Parassara Dejkraisak (Frappe) as Cherry (Ep. 5)

Teedet's childhood love interest and the reason of his venustraphobia.

- Thanyanan Pipatchaisiri (Natty) as Euang (Ep. 3)
- Nattawat Finkler (Patrick) as T-Bone (Ep. 8)
- Nipawan Taveepornsawan (Kai) as T-Rex's mother (Ep. 7-8)

== Soundtrack ==
The theme song of the series is "เล็ก ๆ บ่อย ๆ/Lek Lek Boi Boi"/Small, Often by Gungun.

Below is an incomprehensive list of background music used in the series. The numbers in parentheses indicate the episode the music appears.

Title	Artist(s)	Album	Notable appearance(s) in the series
"A Christmas Dance"	Arthur Benson	Christmas Crawlin'	T-Rex takes pictures around the house (1-1)
"Clouds Inside"	Lalo Brickman	Thy Brother	Watee is revealed to have lost his mom (1-1)
"Lighthouses"	Lalo Brickman	Thy Brother	Watee struggles financially to keep his house (1-1)
"Liberate"	Peter Sandberg	Bark Boats	Watee decides to list his house for rent (1-1)
"Practically Implausible"	Fabien Tell	Spaces Between	Watee lists his house for rent (1-1)
"Lasers and Stuff"	Tigerblood Jewel	Torpedo	Introduction of Watee (1-1)
"Who Took My Cookie"	T. Morri	Comeuppance	Introduction of Teedet (1-1); Ink asks Watee about "Tee" (1-3)
"Suite for Cello Solo No. 1 in G, BWV 1007: I. Prélude"	Pierre Fournier	J.S. Bach: Integrale des Suites pour Violoncelle	The piece Tee-Do is playing when his name is introduced (1-1)
"Daily Grinder"	Addie Horner	Take the Funk	Maitee does not find T-Rex's good news to be good news (1-1); Teedet slips out that he thinks Maetee must be a scum (1-2); People react to Tee-Do's reason to avoid Ink (1-3)
"Where No One Will Go"	Moss Harman	Out the Window	Maetee argues that he does not exactly "fear" ghosts (1-2)
"Don't Walk Alone"	Trailer Worx	Puzzles and Pieces	Maetee speculates there are devils locked up in the cabinet (1-2)
"Awake"	Megan Wofford	Awake	T-Rex sees Watee talking to a photo that he only plans to let the boarders rent for 6 months (1-2)
"Easily Served"	Gerhard Feng	Soul Glue	Maitee reads out the 10 rules Watee drafts (1-2)
"Comes Around"	OTE	Out of the Blue	Watee lays out the final rule: he can sack the boarders anytime (1-2)
"Trapped Outside"	Moss Harman	Out the Window	Watee shuts the door on Ink (1-3); Teedet faints as Ink chases him (1-3); One boarder after another notices suspicious activity in Watee's room (5-2)
"Danish Pastry"	Martin Klem	Once in a Decade	Ink touches Teedet (1-3)
"Paint by Imagination"	Stationary Sign	Paint by Imagination	Ink explains her relationship with Tee-Do (1-3)
"The Longest Road"	Lalo Brickman	Thy Brother	Tee-Do explains the reason why he is avoiding Ink (1-3)
"I Can Still Dance"	Tigerblood Jewel	Torpedo	Everyone realizes Tee-Do's dog will be joining them in the house (1-3)
"Run for the Man"	John Utah	A Friend with a Broken House	Watee reflects on his uncomfortability with strangers in his house (2-1)
"Uninvied Guests"	Étienne Roussel	A Sabotage	Maitee and T-Rex make fun of Teedet's venustraphobia (2-1)
"Trapped in a Maze"	Philip Ayers	Sentries	Teedet's chewing sound annoys Tee-Do and he would not stop (2-1)
"Zone"	Jay Varton	Harbinger	Watee reacts to the pot of the tree he planted with his mother being broken (2-1)
"We Have to Go Back There"	Christian Andersen	Detained	Tee-Do reveals the day is his birthday (2-1)
"Getting Nowhere"	Ameryh	Getting Nowhere	Watee questions Maetee's praying until 3 am (4-1)
"Suspended"	Farrell Wooten	The Den of Lions	Maetee is sent into rooms to find a black umbrella (4-1)
"You Love Drama"	Mindme feat. Emmi	You Love Drama	Maetee lights up the house to lessen his ability to imagine things (4-2)
"Destination Unknown"	EXPERIA	Mind Tricks	Maetee finds out that he is alone in a house where someone died 50 days ago (4-2); Maetee sees Antie Pim for the first time (4-2)
"Midstream"	Heath Cantu	Quietus	Maetee's mom leaves after Maetee asks her to not come again (4-3)
"April in Detroit"	David Celeste	My Dear Fellow	Watee tells that he envies that Maetee still have a mother to tell him off (4-3)
"Cold War Games"	Gabriel Lewis	Rise of the Velcro	Maetee urges his visiting mother to leave in the fear that Watee would find out (4-3)
"A King's Land"	Mike Franklyn	Climb and Scramble	T-Rex tastes a delicious breakfast (5-1); The boarders come together and ask Teedet about his day with Sorn (5-3)
"You Do It Just for Fun"	Colbae	You Do It Just for Fun	Maetee overcomes his fear of ghost (5-1);
"Charmed Encounter"	Arthur Benson	The Science Labs	Teedet questions himself how to define a woman's beauty (5-1); Teedet checks his symptoms when he meets Sorn in the plant market (5-2)
"Grifting in Vegas"	Kit and the Calltones	Ancestors of Mr Brown	One beautiful female student after another walks past Teedet in a classroom (5-1)
"Pas De Basque"	Million Eyes	Rucksack	Teedet proposes to date for a day with Cherry (5-1)
"เธอสวย"	Double U	Endless Love	Teedet's date with Cherry (5-1)
"The Promising"	Howard Harper-Barnes	By Virtue	Teedet and Cherry bless each other at the end of their date (5-1)
"Organized Chaos"	Arthur Benson	The Tail	Teedet checks who is asking for his help with a plant (5-2)
"Barefoot"	Slowfly	Barefoot	Teedet offers to help Sorn buy compost (5-2)
"Belvedere Castle"	Million Eyes	Rucksack	Sorn accepts the Zanzibar Gem from Teedet (5-2)
"Tip"	Million Eyes	Rucksack	Teedet and Sorn text-chat with joy (5-2)
"Unforgettable"	Million Eyes	Rucksack	Teedet notices Sorn has changed her profile photo to black (5-3); Sorn visits Teedet when she learns he is sick (5-3);

== Episodes ==
No.	Title	Original release date
1	"Episode 1 (The TEEs)"	18 September 2020
When he learns that the bank will seize his house due to his late mother's unpaid mortgages, Watee, a.k.a. Tee, decides to earn money by renting out its rooms to T-Rex, Maitee, Tee-Do, Maetee and Teedet—five male college students who are also nicknamed "Tee". After Watee had laid out the rules of his house to the boarders, Tee-Do almost breaks one when his ex-girlfriend comes to the house to see him.
2	"Episode 2 (Eviction Night)"	25 September 2020
Teedo's birthday (which also Watee's birthday) nearly turns into the borders' eviction day when he breaks one of Watee's dearest remembrances of his late mother. T-Rex reveals to his fellow boarders that he has the exact same first and last name as Watee. T-Rex and Maetee work together to help Teedet cope with his fear of beautiful women as Maetee dressed up to become Maetinee, as well as introduced to a girl who eventually slaps Teedet's face.
3	"Episode 3 (Tee-Do)"	2 October 2020
Tee-Do has found a new girlfriend SoundLab, but his revulsion to chewing sounds gives him second thoughts about asking her out for a date. While keeping themselves under Watee's radar, Tee-Do's fellow boarders unite to help him keep their relationship going despite his phobia. It also the start of SoundLab to confuse about Tee-Do's condition.
4	"Episode 4 (Maetee)"	9 October 2020
T-Rex, Maitee, Tee-Do and Teedet work together to help Maetee overcome his phobia of ghosts. One day, Maetee becomes home-alone and apparently runs into the thing he dreads seeing in the house the most.
5	"Episode 5 (Teedet)"	16 October 2020
Maetee decides to rid himself of his fear of ghosts, alongside fixing his relationship with his mother who already feels guilty for being the reason behind his phobia. Teedet helps his former crush regain her lost self-esteem. He later finds romance in a girl he had unintentionally badmouthed for being not pretty but whom he loves for who she is.
6	"Episode 6 (Maitee)"	23 October 2020
Maitee's fear of good news is aggravated with his fear of losing his hospitalized mother. Watee remembers his childhood memories with Maitee, while the other boarders give Maitee the comfort he needs.
7	"Episode 7 (Watee)"	30 October 2020
T-Rex uncovers the reason behind his being Watee's namesake and pleads to Watee to reconcile with their shared past. Filled with mixed emotions, Watee evicts all of the boarders, returning to his life of solitude while struggling to find money for his bank debt and the refunds to the evictees.
8	"Episode 8 (T-Rex)"	6 November 2020
Watee finally learns to reconcile with his father, T-Rex, and the other boarders. He and the five boarders celebrate the friendship they have fostered since the beginning in the boarding house. It also helped the fear of T-Rex of being alone.

== Reception ==
The television ratings of the series in Thailand is shown below. The blue number represents the lowest rating and the red numbers represent the highest ratings.

Episode No.	Timeslot (UTC+07:00)	Average audience share	Ref.
1	Friday 21:30	0.3%	
2	Friday 21:30	0.300%	
3	Friday 21:30	0.2%	
4	Friday 21:30	0.269%	
5	Friday 21:30	0.122%	
6	Friday 21:30	0.236%	
7	Friday 21:30	0.213%	
8	Friday 21:30	0.181%	
