= Kay Lertsittichai =

Thai YouTuber and actor (born 1996)

- เค เลิศสิทธิชัย
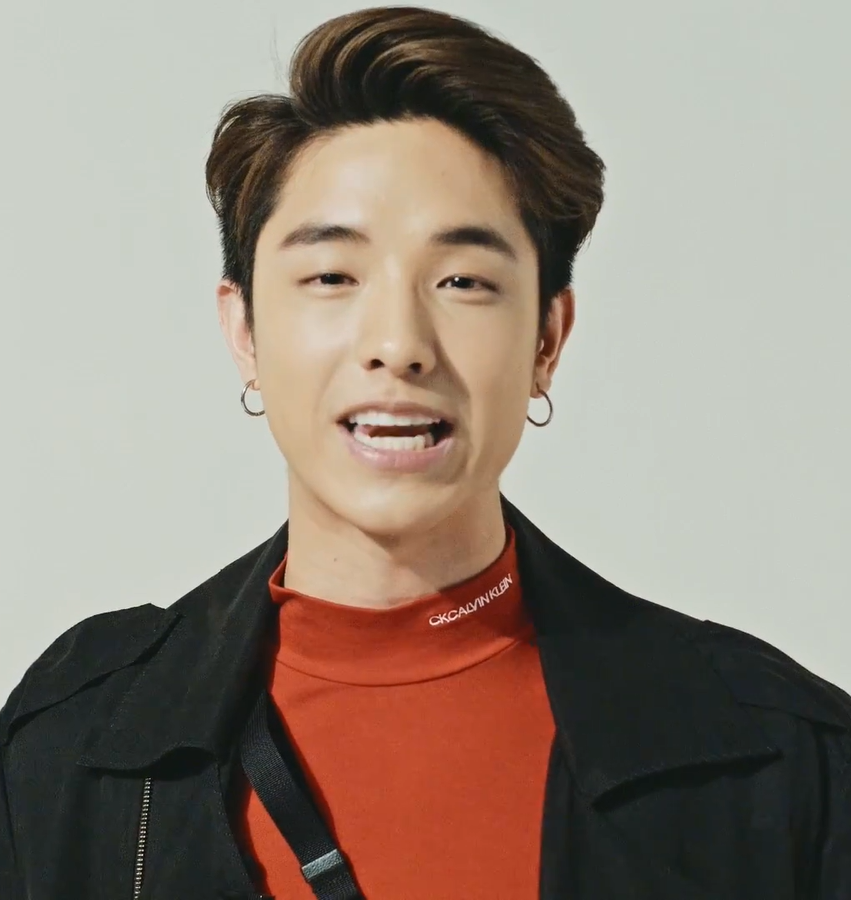
- Lertsittichai in 2018
- Born: 12 December 1996 (age 29); Nakhon Pathom, Thailand
- Other name: Kayavine
- Education: University of Wisconsin–Whitewater (B.M.)
- Occupations: YouTuber; actor
- Years active: 2016–present
- Agent: GMMTV
- Relatives: Ken Lertisittichai

YouTube information
- Channel: Kayavine
- Genres: Reviews; vlogs; reactions
- Subscribers: 1.55 million
- Views: 136.9 million
- Last updated: 9 January 2025

Kay Lertsittichai (Thai: เค เลิศสิทธิชัย; born 12 December 1996), also known under the pseudonym Kayavine, is a Thai YouTuber and actor. He began making YouTube videos in 2016 and has more than one million subscribers as of December 2020. He recently portrayed a main role as Gunkan in GMMTV's Who Are You (2020).

== Early life and education ==
Kay was born in Nakhon Pathom, Thailand. He started his secondary education in Sukhondheerawidh School where he got the opportunity to become an international exchange student to Guilford High School in Illinois, United States.

In 2019, he graduated with a bachelor's degree in mathematics with emphasis on actuarial science from University of Wisconsin–Whitewater.

== Filmography ==
=== Film ===
Year	Title	Role	Notes	Ref.
2021	Deep	Win	Main role	

=== Television ===
Key
†	Denotes television productions that have not yet been released

Year	Title	Role	Notes	Ref.
2019	Wolf	Koji	Guest role	
2020	Who Are You	"Gun" Gunkan	Main role	
2021	55:15 Never Too Late	Amornthep	Main role	
2022	F4 Thailand: Boys Over Flowers	"Talay" Mahasamut Komolpetch	Guest role (Ep. 8-11)	
2022	Good Old Days: Story 3 - Road to Regret	Got	Main role	
2022	School Tales The Series: 7AM	Q	Main role	
2023	Home School	Hugo	Main role	
2023	Wednesday Club	Mac	Main role	
2024	High School Frenemy	"Ken" Kasidit	Supporting role	
2025	Break Up Service	Jang	Guest role (Ep. 5)	
2025	Revamp The Undead Story	Jett	Supporting role	
2026	Love You Teacher	Jee	Supporting role	
2026	Moonshadow	Phu	Supporting role	
TBA	Starscope †	TBA	Supporting role	
TBA	Heartbound †	TBA	Supporting role	
