= Theory of Love (TV series) =

2019 Thai television series

- Official series poster
- Thai: Theory of Love – ทฤษฎีจีบเธอ
- Genre: Boys' love; Romantic comedy; Drama
- Created by: GMMTV
- Based on: Theory of Love (ทฤษฎีจีบเธอ) by JittiRain
- Directed by: Nuttapong Mongkolsawas
- Starring: Atthaphan Phunsawat; Jumpol Adulkittiporn
- Ending theme: "พระเอกจำลอง (Fake Protagonist)" by Getsunova
- Country of origin: Thailand
- Original language: Thai
- No. of episodes: 12

Production
- Running time: 48–62 minutes
- Production company: GMMTV

Original release
- Network: GMM 25; LINE TV
- Release: 1 June – 17 August 2019

Related
- Our Skyy

Theory of Love (Thai: Theory of Love – ทฤษฎีจีบเธอ) is a 2019 Thai boys' love television series starring Atthaphan Phunsawat (Gun) and Jumpol Adulkittiporn (Off). Directed by Nuttapong Mongkolsawas and produced by GMMTV, the series was one of the thirteen television series for 2019 launched by GMMTV in their Wonder Th13teen event on 5 November 2018. It premiered on GMM 25 and LINE TV on 1 June 2019, airing on Saturdays at 21:25 ICT and 23:00 ICT, respectively. The series concluded on 17 August 2019.

== Synopsis ==
The story is about third year film student Third (Atthaphan Phunsawat) who has feelings for his friend Khai (Jumpol Adulkittiporn) for three years with a result of painful unrequited love. Third decides to stop his feelings no matter how difficult it may be. But when Third decides to move on, Khai incidentally realizes that he also has feelings for Third.

== Cast and characters ==
=== Main ===
- Atthaphan Phunsawat (Gun) as Third
- Jumpol Adulkittiporn (Off) as Khai
- Nawat Phumphotingam (White) as Two
- Chinnarat Siriphongchawalit (Mike) as Bone

=== Supporting ===
- Pirapat Watthanasetsiri (Earth) as Aun
- Sara Legge as Paan
- Neen Suwanamas as Lyn
- Patara Eksangkul (Foei) as Chaine
- Supakan Benjaarruk (Nok) as Ching Ching
- Latkamon Pinrojkirati (Pim)

=== Guest ===
- Alysaya Tsoi (Alice) (Ep. 1)
- Benjamin Joseph Varney as Ton (Ep. 6–7)
- Thanaboon Wanlopsirinun (Na) as Gab, Paan's Boyfriend (Ep. 8–9, 11–12)
- Jiratpisit Jaravijit (Boom) as a boy in the bar (Ep. 11)
- Sutthipha Kongnawdee (Noon) as Bone's girlfriend (Ep. 12)
- Sureeyaret Yakaret (Prigkhing) as Fahsai
- Patnicha Kulasingh (Plai) as Nong Som
- Kris Songsamphant as an actor auditioning for the play (Ep. 7)

== Special ==
On 26 October 2020, GMMTV announced a special episode of the said series with the title Stand By Me which aired on 28 October 2020.

== Soundtrack ==
Song title	Romanized title	Artist	Ref.
พระเอกจำลอง	Pra Ake Jum Long	Getsunova	

== Reception ==
=== Viewership ===
In the table below, the blue numbers represent the lowest ratings and the red number represents the highest rating.

Episode No.	Timeslot (UTC+07:00)	Air date	Average audience share	Ref.
1	Saturday 21:25	1 June 2019	0.420%	
2	Saturday 21:25	8 June 2019	0.208%	
3	Saturday 21:25	15 June 2019	0.284%	
4	Saturday 21:25	22 June 2019	0.252%	
5	Saturday 21:25	29 June 2019	0.302%	
6	Saturday 21:25	6 July 2019	0.269%	
7	Saturday 21:25	13 July 2019	0.2%	
8	Saturday 21:25	20 July 2019	0.303%	
9	Saturday 21:25	27 July 2019	0.317%	
10	Saturday 21:25	3 August 2019	0.3%	
11	Saturday 21:25	10 August 2019	0.244	
12	Saturday 21:25	17 August 2019	0.267%	

=== Awards and nominations ===
Year	Award Ceremony	Category	Recipient(s)	Result	Ref.
2020	LINE TV Awards	Best Couple	Atthaphan Phunsawat (Gun); Jumpol Adulkittiporn (Off)	Won	
2020	LINE TV Awards	Most Hearted Content of the Year	Theory of Love	Won	

== International broadcast ==
- Japan – On 28 September 2020, Klockworx Co., Ltd. announced that it had acquired distribution rights of three television series from GMMTV which included the said series. It is scheduled to be distributed locally in Japanese subtitles by early 2021.
- Philippines – The series was among the five GMMTV television series acquired by ABS-CBN Corporation, as announced by Dreamscape Entertainment on 10 September 2020. All episodes were made available for streaming via iWantTFC on 7 December 2020.
