= Dinosaur Love =

2023 Thai television series

- Genre: Boys' love; Romantic comedy; Drama
- Based on: Dinosaur Love by Scriper
- Directed by: Zaanook Jukkroww Nipitpon Muangsinun; Thonnam Piamchon Damrongsunthornchai
- Starring: Pepper Pongpat Unhapipatpong; Kong Montree Pattarachitphinyo; Aomstin Thakrit Patthanaworakit; Mos Kitrawee Jiangthanaroj; Boss Sutthiphat Thuanthong; Peak Natchanon Chaipongpati; SaengNuea Jitaboon Ngamboonyarak
- Country of origin: Thailand
- Original language: Thai
- No. of seasons: 1
- No. of episodes: 8

Production
- Producer: Ultimate Troop
- Production company: Ultimate Troop

Original release
- Network: Amarin TV; iQIYI (uncut version)
- Release: June 25 – August 13, 2023

Dinosaur Love (th:ไดโนซอร์รัก) is a Thai romantic comedy and Boys' love television series produced by Ultimate Troop. Based on the novel of the same name by Scriper, the series was directed by Zaanook Jukkroww Nipitpon Muangsinun and Thonnam Piamchon Damrongsunthornchai. It stars Pongpat Unhapipatpong (Pepper) and Montree Pattarachitphinyo (Kong).

The series aired from 25 June to 13 August 2023 on Amarin TV, with international distribution through iQIYI.

== Synopsis ==
After discovering that he has been betrayed by both his boyfriend and his best friend, Rak struggles to overcome heartbreak. During this difficult period, Dino, a straightforward and impulsive university senior, develops feelings for him and openly pursues a relationship. As Rak slowly regains his trust in others, Dino's persistence brings them closer, turning an unexpected encounter into a new love story.

== Cast ==
=== Main ===
- Pepper Pongpat Unhapipatpong as Dino
- Kong Montree Pattarachitphinyo as Rak Passakorn

=== Supporting ===
- Mos Kitrawee Jiangthanaroj as Chalam
- Aomstin Thakrit Patthanaworakit as Suea
- Boss Sutthiphat Thuanthong as Mhee
- Get Sorawut Arunwattananunt as Top
- Petch Chanapoom Thenwong as Korn
- Peak Natchanon Chaipongpati as Mek
- Jitaboon Ngamboonyarak (SaengNuea) as Seekhram
- Sun Worrachid Phuetphanngam as Tart
- Seoul Weeramethachai as Gift
- Michelle Ravisara Chawala as Peace

=== Guest appearances ===
- Saran Anantasetthakul (Ton) as Ton
- Thonnam Piamchon Damrongsunthornchai as Hia
- Peemapol Panichtamrong (Peak) as Sim
- Thanakrit Chiamchunya (Ohm) as Ohm
- Samantha Melanie (Sammy) Coates as Plabu
- Phiravich Attachitsataporn (Mean) as Mean
- Park Parnupat Anomakiti as Sutyot
- Toosafe Kirttawat Suwanich as Toosafe

== Soundtrack ==
Year	Title	Artist	Notes
2023	"Rak Raek Phop" (รักแรกพบ)	Pongpat Unhapipatpong (Pepper) and Montree Pattarachitphinyo (Kong)	Promotional theme song

== Promotional events ==
Date	Event	Venue
29 May 2023	Dinosaur Love Launch Event (Amarin Expo 2023)	Queen Sirikit National Convention Center, Bangkok

=== Listicles ===
Year-end lists for Dinosaur Love
Critic/Publication	List	Rank	Ref.
Sanook	Best Thai BL and GL Series of 2023–2024	Included	
