= Your Dear Daddy =

2026 Thai television series

- Official poster
- เรียกแด๊ดสิธาร
- Genre: Drama / Romance / Boys' love
- Written by: Natid Kaveekornwong
- Directed by: Natid Kaveekornwong
- Starring: Jitaboon Ngamboonyarak; Pusit Dittapisit
- Country of origin: Thailand
- Original language: Thai
- No. of seasons: 1

Production
- Running time: 45 minutes
- Production companies: Make Some Noise; Studio Wabi Sabi

Original release
- Network: IQIYI; 9 MCOT

Your Dear Daddy (Thai: เรียกแด๊ดสิธาร) is a Thai romantic drama television series in the boys' love (BL) genre, directed and written by Rice Natid Kaveekornwong. Starring Pusit Dittapisit (Fluke) and Jitaboon Ngamboonyarak (Poonpun), the series is set to premiere on 9 May 2026 on IQIYI and 9 MCOT. It is a production by Make Some Noise in partnership with Studio Wabi Sabi.

== Synopsis ==
Saitharn is a young man marked by painful past experiences who decides to move to Chiang Rai. There, he meets Sila, an older, influential man who runs a farm and a hotel. After an intense encounter, Saitharn finds himself in debt and begins working for Sila. Their relationship, initially defined by financial obligations, evolves into an unexpected bond.

== Cast and characters ==
=== Main ===
- Jitaboon Ngamboonyarak (Saengnuea / Poonpun) as Saitharn (สายธาร)
- Pusit Dittapisit (Fluke) as Sila (ศิลา)

=== Supporting ===
- Ramita Kamiya (Nana) as Kael (เกล)
- Methakarn Anektanasuwan (Mae) as Mueangprae (เหมือนแพร)
- Phudit Kannaphan (Caesar) as Mok (หมอก)
- Defei Chan (Defay) as Saengla (แสงหล้า)
- Jakarin Puribhat (Gap) as Maen Mueang (แม้นเมือง)
- Setthanan Manunapichu (Paam) as Jakkrit (จักรกริช)
- Namnung Suttidachanai (Namnueng) as Wipha (วิภา)
- Nisachon Tuamsoongnuen (Me) as Phon (พร)

== Production ==
The series was announced in 2024, with an official pilot released on 14 May 2024, lasting 6 minutes and 37 seconds, starring Fluke Pusit and Poonpun Jitaboon. By 2026, the pilot had accumulated over 1.6 million views.

The production's blessing ceremony took place in September 2025, and official filming began in December of the same year. The series is a production by WERS Entertainment, Make Some Noise, and Studio Wabi Sabi.

The official trailer was released on YouTube on 23 April 2026.

== Broadcast ==
Your Dear Daddy premieres on 9 May 2026, airing every Saturday at 10:30 p.m. (TH) on Channel 9 MCOT HD (9 MCOT, channel 30). An UNCUT version will be available on IQIYI and iQ.com at 11:00 p.m. starting from the same day.

A special episode (Episode Special) titled "เรียกแด๊ดมาเล่น" (Come Play, Dear Daddy) aired on 25 April and 2 May 2026 on Channel 9 MCOT HD, featuring the cast playing games and sharing behind-the-scenes moments.

== Reception ==
Sanook published articles about the pilot and fan expectations. Naewna also highlighted the production's cultural impact.
