= Jumpol Adulkittiporn =

Thai actor, model and host (born 1991)

- จุมพล อดุลกิตติพร
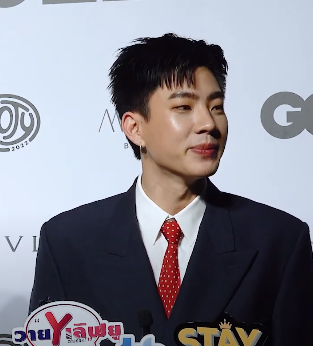
- Jumpol in December 2022
- Born: 20 January 1991 (age 35); Bangkok, Thailand
- Other name: Off
- Education: B.S., Silpakorn University Information and Communication Tech.
- Occupations: Actor; Host
- Years active: 2013–present
- Agent: GMMTV
- Known for: Puen in Room Alone 401–410 and Room Alone 2; Bright in SOTUS and SOTUS S; Khai in Theory of Love; Maetee in I'm Tee, Me Too; Sean in Not Me; Tankhun in Astrophile; Ten in Cooking Crush; Jane in The Trainee; Boss in Break Up Service; Koh in Burnout Syndrome
- Height: 1.78 m (5 ft 10 in)

Jumpol Adulkittiporn (Thai: จุมพล อดุลกิตติพร; born 20 January 1991), nicknamed Off (Thai: ออฟ), is a Thai actor and host. He is best known for his starring roles in Theory of Love (2019), Not Me (2021–2022), and Astrophile (2022) for which he was the national winner of the Best Actor in a Supporting Role category for Thailand at the 2022 Asian Academy Creative Awards.

== Early life and education ==
Jumpol was born in Bangkok, Thailand. He completed his secondary education in Wat Rajabopit School. He graduated with a bachelor's degree from the Faculty of Information and Communication Technology in Silpakorn University.

== Career ==
Jumpol began working in the entertainment industry as host of the 2013 TV program Five Live Fresh. After the show, he debuted as an actor with a guest role in the 2013 Thai drama series Hormones, and got his first main role in the 2014 series Room Alone 401-410.

Jumpol continued working with GMMTV. He gained prominence for playing Pick in Senior Secret Love: Puppy Honey (2016) and its respective sequel alongside Atthaphan Phunsawat, with whom he later went on to star in the 2019 romantic drama Theory of Love and 2021 action drama Not Me.

In 2022, under GMMTV, Jumpol starred in the series Astrophile for which he received "Best Supporting Actor Award".

== Personal life ==
In March 2024, his father, Sompob Adulkittiporn, died.

== Filmography ==
=== Television series ===
Key
†	Denotes television productions that have not yet been released

Year	Title	Role	Notes	Ref.
2013	Hormones	Bee's boyfriend	Guest role	
2014	Room Alone 401-410	Puen	Main role	
2015	Wifi Society: The Horror Home	Sam	Main role	
2015	Ugly Duckling: Pity Girl	Tom	Support role	
2015	Room Alone 2	Puen	Main role	
2016	Senior Secret Love: Puppy Honey	"Pick" Pakorn Sirinachot	Main role	
2016	SOTUS	Bright	Support role	
2017	Love Songs Love Series: Still Single	Nem	Support role	
2017	Senior Secret Love: Puppy Honey 2	"Pick" Pakorn Sirinachot	Main role	
2017	U-Prince: The Ambitious Boss	Li Tang	Main role	
2017	She is My Destiny	—N/a	Guest role	
2017	Teenage Mom: The Series	Dentist assistant	Guest role	
2017	Bangkok Love Story: Keep Love	Joe	Support role	
2017	Fabulous 30: The Series	Zen	Support role	
2017	SOTUS S	Bright	Support role	
2018	Chuamong Tong Mon	Sun	Support role	
2018	Our Skyy	"Pick" Pakorn Sirinachot	Main role	
2019	Wolf	Por	Main role	
2019	Theory of Love	Khai	Main role	
2020	Girl Next Room: Motorbike Baby	Krathing	Guest role	
2020	Girl Next Room: Midnight Fantasy	Krathing	Support role	
2020	Girl Next Room: Richy Rich	Krathing	Main role	
2020	Girl Next Room: Security Love	Krathing	Guest role	
2020	The Shipper	—N/a	Guest role	
2020	Fai Sin Chua	Ron	Support role	
2020	I'm Tee, Me Too	Mae-Tee	Main role	
2021	Girl2K	Tawin	Main role	
2021	46 Days	Pat	Main role	
2021	Not Me	Sean	Main role	
2022	Cat Radio TV Season 2	Jay	Guest role	
2022	Astrophile	Tankhun	Main role	
2022	Club Sapan Fine Season 2	Jet	Main role	
2022	10 Years Ticket	Plu	Main role	
2022	Midnight Motel	Mote	Main role	
2023	The Jungle	Pine	Main role	
2023	Cooking Crush	"Ten" Todsatid Wannaphongjinda	Main role	
2024	The Trainee	"Jane" Jirapat Khunkhao	Main role	
2025	Break Up Service	"Boss" Pakorn Pasupakorn	Main role	
2025	Burnout Syndrome	"Koh" Korawick Kitiwela	Main role	
2026	Mr. Kill	"Thun" Thawikorn Putthanan	Support role	
2026	Gunshot †	Kongpon	Main role	
TBA	Saran Wants You! †	Lom	Main role	
TBA	High & Low: Born to Be High †	Peakboy	TBA	

=== Special ===
Year	Title	Character	Role
2016	Little Big Dream	Customer	Guest role
2019	Love from Outta Space	Off	Main role
2020	Cornetto Love Expert	—N/a	Main role
2020	Theory of Love: Special Episode "Stand By Me"	Khai	Main role

=== Music video appearances ===
Year	Title	Artist	Label	Ref.
2013	"อยากรู้"	Plastic Plastic	Believe Records	
2014	"สัญญาณ (Sign)"	Jetset'er	GMM Grammy	
2014	"จิ๊กซอว์ (Jigsaw)"	Praew Kanitlul feat. Punpun	Pond's Thailand	
2014	"ลอง (Try)"	Paradox	Genie Rock	
2016	"คนมีเสน่ห์"	Nakarin Kingsak	Genie Rock	
2016	"ฝน (Rain)"	Scrubb	Tero Music	
2017	"คนแบบไหนดี"; Secret Seven OST	PunPun Sutatta	GMMTV Records	
2018	"เข้าใจใช่ไหม"; Our Skyy OST	Fiat Pattadon	GMMTV Records	
2019	"พระเอกจำลอง (Fake Protagonist)"; Theory of Love OST	Getsunova	White Music	
2021	"ป่ะล่ะ (PALA)"	POKMINDSET	MINDSET MOB	
2021	"Not Me"; Not Me OST	KANGSOMKS	GMMTV Records	
2024	"ฝึกรัก (Love Training)"; The Trainee OST	Gun Atthaphan	GMMTV Records	

=== Hosting ===
Year	Title
2013 - 2015	Five Live Fresh
2015 - 2016	Proteen
2016	ชิงกันเทรนด์ (Trend Battle)
2017 - 2018	OffGun Fun Night Season 1
2018 - 2024	รถโรงเรียน School Rangers
2018	แต่งหน้ากันครับ (Let's Put On Makeup)
2019	Beauty & The Babes Season 2
2019	OffGun Fun Night Season 2
2020	Live At Lunch Season 1
2020	เฟรนด์ขับ (Friend Drive)
2020	Beauty & the Babes Season 3
2020 - 2022	รสมือแม่ (OffGun Mommy Taste)
2020	Dear Future Diary Thailand
2021	Live At Lunch Season 2
2021	Live At Lunch: Friend Lunch Friend Live

== Discography ==
=== Singles ===
==== Collaborations ====
Year	Title	Label	Ref.
2019	"ความเงียบดังที่สุด (The Loudest Silence)" with Gun Atthaphan	GMMTV Records	
2020	"ไม่รักไม่ลง (Too Cute To Handle)" with Gun Atthaphan	GMMTV Records	
2020	"ตุ๊บๆ จุ๊บๆ OK!" with Gun Atthaphan, Krist Perawat, Singto Prachaya, Bright Vachirawit, Win Metawin	GMMTV Records	
2022	"กฎของแรงดึงดูด (The Law of Attraction)" with Gun Atthaphan, Krist Perawat, Singto Prachaya, Tay Tawan, New Thitipoom, Bright Vachirawit, Win Metawin	GMMTV Records	
2023	"Save All Memories In This House" with Gun Atthaphan, Earth Pirapat, Mix Sahaphap, Joong Archen, Dunk Natachai, Jimmy Jitaraphol, Sea Tawinan, Neo Trai, Louis Thanawin	GMMTV Records	
2023	"กอด กอด (Hugs)" with Gun Atthaphan, Tay Tawan, New Thitipoom, Pond Naravit, Phuwin Tangsakyuen, Gemini Norawit, Fourth Nattawat, Perth Tanpon, Chimon Wachirawit	GMMTV Records	
2024	"ข้างๆยังว่าง (Available)" with Gun Atthaphan	GMMTV Records	

==== Soundtrack appearances ====
Year	Title	Soundtrack	Label	Ref.
2022	"เข้าข้างตัวเอง (My Side)" with Gun Atthaphan	Not Me OST	GMMTV Records	
2023	"Beast Inside" with Krist Perawat, Nanon Korapat, Lee Thanat, Luke Ishikawa	The Jungle OST	GMMTV Records	
2023	"จุดจบคนเก่ง (In The End)"	The Jungle OST	GMMTV Records	
2023	"What's Zabb" with Gun Atthaphan	Cooking Crush OST	GMMTV Records	
2025	"My Forever" with Gun Atthaphan	Burnout Syndrome OST	GMMTV Records	

== Fan meetings ==
Solo

Title	Date	Venue	Ref.
Hoping You're Happy: Off Fan Meeting in Chongqing	9 June 2024	Chongqing, China	
Because of You: Off Fan Sign in Hangzhou	17 May 2026	Hangzhou, China	

Joint

Title	Date	Venue	Notes	Ref.
At First Sight with Rookie Boys in Guangzhou	24 Mar 2017	Guangzhou Performing Arts Center Theater, Guangzhou	with Krist, Singto, New, Gunsmile, Oaujun	
OffGun Fan Meeting in Korea	20 May 2017	Anyang Arts Center	with Gun	
KristSingto, Off & New Fan Meeting in Chengdu	22 Jul 2017	Jincheng Art Palace, Chengdu	with Krist, Singto, New	
OffGun Fan Meeting in Taipei	12 August 2017	Liberty Square International Auditorium	with Gun	
SOTUS S Nation and Fan Meeting	16 Dec 2017	Kad Suan Kaew Shopping Center, Chiang Mai	with SOTUS S cast	
SOTUS S Nation and Fan Meeting	23 Dec 2017	Terminal 21 Shopping Center, Korat	with SOTUS S cast	
SOTUS S Nation and Fan Meeting	13 Jan 2018	Central Plaza Ladprao, Bangkok	with SOTUS S cast	
SOTUS S Hazing in Manila	20 Jan 2018	Pasig City Hall Complex, Manila	with SOTUS S cast	
SOTUS S Nation and Fan Meeting	27 Jan 2018	Hatyai Hall, Central Festival Hatyai Shopping Center	with SOTUS S cast	
OffGun Fan Meeting in Manila	10 February 2018	Teatrino Promenade, Greenhills Shopping Center	with Gun	
SOTUS S Fan Meeting in Chengdu	17 Mar 2018	Zhenghuo Art Center, Chengdu	with SOTUS S cast	
SOTUS S Fan Meeting in Taipei	25 Mar 2018	ATT Show Box, Taipei	with SOTUS S cast	
SOTUS S Fan Meeting in Tianjin	31 Mar 2018	Tianjin Wuqing Theater, Tianjin	with SOTUS S cast	
SOTUS S Fan Meeting in Wuhan	14 Jul 2018	Wuhan Cultural Museum Center, Wuhan	with SOTUS S cast	
SOTUS S Fan Meeting in Wuxi	25 Aug 2018	HUALUXE Wuxi Taihu, Wuxi	with SOTUS S cast	
OffGun Fun Night in Malaysia	1 September 2018	PJ Live Arts Centre	with Gun	
SOTUS: ENCORE Fan Meeting in Taipei	22 Sep 2018	Taipei International Convention Center	with SOTUS S cast	
OffGun Fan Meeting in Shenzhen	2 March 2019	The Panglin Hotel, Shenzhen	with Gun	
OffGun Fan Meeting in Hong Kong	31 March 2019	KITEC LIVE	with Gun	
OffGun Fan Meeting in Myanmar	18 May 2019	LOTTE Hotel Crystal Ballroom, Myanmar	with Gun	
Theory of Love Fan Meeting in Taipei	22 June 2019	WESTAR	with Theory of Love cast	
OffGun Fan Meeting in Vietnam	29 June 2019	Hong Bang International University, Vietnam	with Gun	
Our Skyy Fan Meeting in Taipei	21 Jul 2019	Taipei International Convention Center	with Gun, Krist, Singto, Tay, New, Drake, Frank, Pluem, Chimon	
OffGun Fan Meeting in Korea	24 August 2019	Howon Art Hall, Korea	with Gun	
Funtastic Babii: OffGun Fan Meeting in Thailand	21 September 2019	Chaengwatthana Hall, CentralPlaza Chaengwattana	with Gun	
Our Skyy Fan Meeting in Myanmar	9 Nov 2019	Pullman Yangon Centrepoint Hotel, Myanmar	with Gun, Krist, Singto, Tay, New, Drake, Frank, Pluem, Chimon	
Worldwide Live Fan Meeting: OffGun	June 2020	V LIVE	with Gun	
OffGun Fan Meeting in Japan	24 September 2022	Yurakucho Asahi Hall, Yurakucho Mullion	with Gun	
OffGun Fan Meeting in Singapore	20 November 2022	Simpor Junior Ballroom, Marina Bay Sands	with Gun	
GMMTV Fan Day 2 in Osaka	25–26 February 2023	Dojima River Forum, Osaka	with Gun	
OffGun Fan Meeting in Taipei	8 April 2023	Zepp New Taipei, Honhui Plaza	with Gun	
OffGun Fan Meeting in Hong Kong	2 June 2023	Rotunda 3, KITEC	with Gun	
OffGun Fan Meeting in Seoul	29 July 2023	New Millennium Hall, Konkuk University	with Gun	
24th Thai Festival: Tokyo; OffGun Special Fan Meeting	9 May 2024	Yamano Hall, Tokyo	with Gun	
OffGun Fan Meeting in Hong Kong	10 August 2024	AXA Dreamland, Go Park	with Gun	
GMMTV Fan Day 7 in Cambodia	10 September 2023	Aeon Mall, Sen Sok City	with Gun	
GMMTV Fan Day 11 in Seoul	22 June 2024	Guro-gu Community Center, Seoul	with Gun	
GMMTV Fan Day 13 in Manila	6 July 2024	SM North EDSA Skydome	with Gun	
The Trainee Final EP. Fan Meeting	15 September 2024	Siam Pavalai Royal Grand Theater, Siam Paragon	with The Trainee cast	
JIB Dream Fanmeet 4: JIB BL Festival	11 January 2025	Hilton Rome Airport Hotel, Rome	with Gun	
OffGun European Tour: OffGun Fan Meeting in Madrid	4 October 2025	Kinépolis Ciudad de la Imagen, Madrid	with Gun	
OffGun European Tour: OffGun Fan Meeting in London	6 October 2025	The Clapham Grand, London	with Gun	
OffGun European Tour: OffGun Fan Meeting in Paris	8 October 2025	La Palmeraie, Paris	with Gun	
Burnout Syndrome: Begins	26 November 2025	Siam Pavalai Royal Grand Theater, Siam Paragon	with Burnout Syndrome cast	
Burnout Syndrome Final EP. Fan Meeting	4 February 2026	Siam Pavalai Royal Grand Theater, Siam Paragon	with Burnout Syndrome cast	
Gunshot: The First Shot	November 23, 2026	SF World Cinema, Centralworld	with Gunshot cast	

== Concerts ==
Title	Date	Venue	Notes	Ref.
Meet Greet Eat ว้าก with Sotus the series	14 January 2017	Scala Cinema, Siam Square, Bangkok	with SOTUS cast	
Y I Love U Fan Party	3 September 2017	Thunder Dome, Muang Thong Thani	with Gun, Krist, Singto, Earth, New, Sing, Tay, Got, Amp, Gun Achi	
SOTUS: The Memories	5 May 2018	Thunder Dome, Muang Thong Thani	with SOTUS cast	
Y I Love U Fan Party 2019 next to Ha Island Y	26-27 January 2019	Thunder Dome, Muang Thong Thani	with Gun, Krist, Singto, Tay, New, Drake, Frank, Earth, Oaujun, Fiat, Guy, Nammon, Neo, Phuwin	
SOTUS The Reunion 4ever More	22 August 2020	V LIVE	with SOTUS cast	
GMMTV Fantopia 2020	21-22 November 2020	Impact Arena, Muang Thong Thani	with Gun	
Love Out Loud Fan Fest 2022	20 August 2022	Impact Arena, Muang Thong Thani	with Gun, Krist, Singto, Tay, New, Bright, Win	
The Krist Elements Concert	21-22 October 2023	Union Hall, Union Mall	with Krist, Gun, Singto, Tay, New, Gawin	
GMMTV Happy Weekend in Japan	24 February 2024	Tachikawa Stage Garden	with Gun, Tay, New, Pond, Phuwin, Joong, Dunk, Jimmy, Sea, First, Khaotung, Gemini, Fourth, Perth, Chimon	
GMMTV Fan Fest 2024: Macau	8 December 2024	Galaxy Arena, Macau	with Gun, Tay, New, Earth, Mix, Boun, Prem, Pond, Phuwin, Joong, Dunk, Jimmy, Sea, First, Khaotung, Milk, Love	
GMMTV Starlympics 2024	21 December 2024	Impact Arena, Muang Thong Thani	GMMTV Artists	
GMMTV Fan Fest 2025: Japan	13 January 2025	Tokyo Garden Theater, Tokyo	with Gun, Krist, Singto, Tay, New, Pond, Phuwin, Jimmy, Sea, Gemini, Fourth	
PEBACA What A Concert in Bangkok	22 March 2025	Thunder Dome, Muang Thong Thani	with Gun, Krist, Singto, Tay, New	
PEBACA What A Concert in Singapore	7 September 2025	D'Marquee Downtown East, Singapore	with Gun, Krist, Singto, Tay, New	
PEBACA What A Concert in Japan	28 September 2025	Toyosu PIT, Tokyo	with Gun, Krist, Singto, Tay, New	
PEBACA What A Concert in Manila	22 November 2025	Up theater, Manila, Philippines	with Gun, Krist, Singto, Tay, New	
GMMTV Starlympics 2025	20 December 2025	Impact Arena, Muang Thong Thani	GMMTV Artists	
GMMTV Fan Fest 2026: Japan	21 February 2026	Tokyo Garden Theater, Japan	with Gun, Krist, Singto, Tay, New, Boun, Prem, Pond, Phuwin, Joong, Dunk, Sky, Nani	
PEBACA What A Concert in Taipei	22 March 2026	Zepp New Taipei	with Gun, Krist, Singto, Tay, New	
PerthSanta Devil's Kiss Concert	19 July 2026	Paragon Hall	with Perth, Santa, Force, Junior	
SOTUS Teniversary concert	29-30 August 2026	Union Hall, Union Mall	with Krist, Singto, New, Neen, Gunsmile, Fluke, Jan, Ice, Oat, Wawa, Prince, Amp, Gun Achi	
NamtanFilm Glamorous Fancon	13 November 2026	Thunder Dome, Muang Thong Thani	with Namtan, Film	
GMMTV Starlympics 2026	28 November 2026	Impact Arena, Muang Thong Thani	GMMTV Artists	
PEBACA Legacy Fam Concert	30–31 January 2027	BITEC LIVE	with Gun, Krist, Singto, Tay, New, Nanon, Namtan, Gawin, Nani, JingJing, Prem, Sky, Bonnie, Phuwin	

== Awards and nominations ==
Year	Award	Category	Work	Result	Ref.
2017	Great Stars Social Awards	Couple of the Year (with Gun Atthaphan)	Senior Secret Love: Puppy Honey	Nominated	
2018	Great Stars Social Awards	Best Couple (with Gun Atthaphan)	Senior Secret Love: Puppy Honey 2	Nominated	
2018	HOWE Awards	Best Couple (with Gun Atthaphan)	Senior Secret Love: Puppy Honey 2	Won	
2018	Maya Awards	Best Couple (with Gun Atthaphan)	Senior Secret Love: Puppy Honey 2	Nominated	
2019	Great Stars Social Awards	Best Couple (with Gun Atthaphan)	Theory of Love	Won	
2019	Kazz Awards	Kazz Magazine's Choice (Male)	—N/a	Won	
2019	2019 Line TV Awards	Best Couple (with Gun Atthaphan)	Our Skyy	Won	
2019	ManGu Magazine Thailand Headlines Person of the Year	Best Couple (with Gun Atthaphan)	Theory of Love	Won	
2019	Maya Awards	Best Couple (with Gun Atthaphan)	Theory of Love	Won	
2020	2020 Line TV Awards	Best Couple (with Gun Atthaphan)	Theory of Love	Won	
2020	Joox Thailand Music Awards	Most Stylish Male	—N/a	Won	
2020	Maya Awards	Best Couple (with Gun Atthaphan)	Theory of Love	Nominated	
2021	Kazz Awards	Top Actor Award	—N/a	Nominated	
2022	Kazz Awards	Best Scene (with Gun Atthaphan)	Not Me	Nominated	
2022	Maya Awards	Best Couple (with Gun Atthaphan)	Not Me	Nominated	
2022	Asian Academy Creative Awards	Asian Academy Creative Award for Best Actor in a Supporting Role (National Winner)	Astrophile	Won	
2024	Kazz Awards	Man of the Year	—N/a	Won	
