= Atthaphan Phunsawat =

Thai actor and host (born 1993)

- อรรถพันธ์ พูลสวัสดิ์
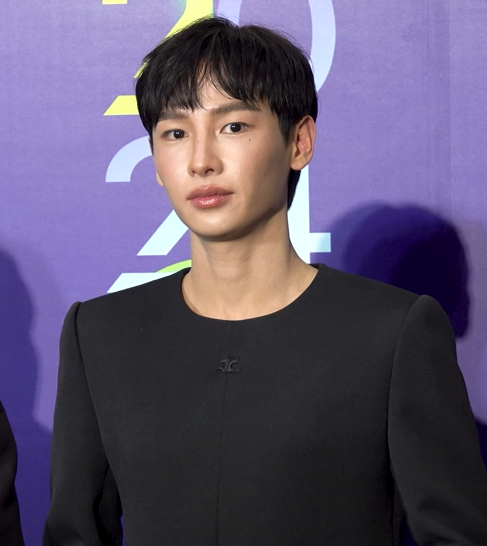
- Atthaphan in April 2024
- Born: 4 October 1993 (age 33); Bangkok, Thailand
- Other name: Gun (กัน)
- Education: Bangkok University; Ramkhamhaeng University
- Occupations: Actor; television host
- Years active: 2003–present
- Agent: GMMTV
- Known for: Punn in The Gifted; Third in Theory of Love; T-Rex in I'm Tee, Me Too; Black/White in Not Me; Prem in Cooking Crush; Ryan in The Trainee; Ozone in Leap Day; Jira in Burnout Syndrome
- Height: 1.70 m (5 ft 7 in)

Atthaphan Phunsawat (Thai: อรรถพันธ์ พูลสวัสดิ์; born 4 October 1993), nicknamed Gun (Thai: กัน), is a Thai actor. He began his career in the entertainment industry as a child and gained critical recognition for his role in the film Slice (2009), Atthaphan is best known for his work in Thai television dramas, particularly his roles in The Gifted (2018), Theory of Love (2019), and Not Me (2021).

== Early life and education ==
Atthaphan was born in Bangkok, Thailand. He used to study Business Administration at the University of Bangkok but now he is studying Political Science at Ramkhamhaeng University.

== Career ==
At a young age, Atthaphan entered the entertainment industry supported by his mother, who knew about her son's ambitions: 'Mommy, Gun wants to be on TV', he reminisced in an interview. With her support, he auditioned for film companies and became the first winner of The Boy Model Competition 2003.

His first main role came in 2004's 'Gomin', one of his more popular works in Thailand. This folklore soap-opera was very popular when it aired and pushed Gun to become a known child actor at the age of nine to ten. Since then, he has been continuously active in the industry—to a greater or lesser extent—taking part in a pile of Channel 7 and Channel 3's TV dramas throughout his childhood.

Particularly, it was in the field of cinema that Atthaphan started to stand out in the drama genre, where he was noticed in alternative productions such as Kongkiat Khomsiri's Slice (2009), a Thai thriller where a teenage Gun surprised audiences by portraying an abused child, subsequently being nominated for the Suphannahong National Film Awards and to win Best Supporting Actor at the 7th Chalerm Thai Awards (2010).

Another production that earned him prestige for his acting prowess was undoubtedly Anucha Boonyawatana's film 'The Blue Hour' (2015), whose role of Tam won him a nomination of Best Actor at Thai Film Directors Association Awards and another at Suphannahong National Film Awards (2016), additionally winning Performance of the Year at the Bioscope Awards 2015 alongside his co-star Oabnithi Wiwattanawarang (Oab).

After signing with GMMTV in 2016, Gun gained prominence for playing Rome in 'Senior Secret Love: Puppy Honey' (2016) and its respective sequel alongside Jumpol Adulkittiporn. The strong chemistry between the two led them to host web programs, to release the single 'Too Cute To Handle' and starring roles in the romantic drama 'Theory of Love' (2019). Together, Off and Gun received numerous Best Couple Awards from award-giving bodies such as Maya Awards (2018, 2019) and LINE TV Awards (2019, 2020).

Atthaphan also found independent acclaim for his performance as Punn in 'The Gifted' (2018), for which he won Best Fight Scene at the LINE TV Awards (2019) and Best Actor in a Supporting Role at the 24th Asian Television Awards (2020).

Outside his acting career, Gun owns the clothing brand GENTE and co-owns another clothing brand Too Cute To Be Cool with actresses Alice Tsoi and Nichaphat Chatchaipholrat (Pearwah).

Following their continued success, Off and Gun reunited for the critically acclaimed political thriller series Not Me (2021–2022), where Atthaphan played dual roles as twin brothers White and Black. His performance in this series garnered significant praise for its complexity and depth.

In 2022, Atthaphan continued his prolific acting career with roles in series such as The Three GentleBros, Club Sapan Fine 2: Ill-Fated Pair, and The War of Flowers. The following year, 2023, saw him star in several notable productions including the supernatural thriller Midnight Museum as Dome/Chan/The One, for which he earned the **Outstanding Asian Star** award at the Seoul International Drama Awards 2023. He also appeared in Home School as Run and the romantic comedy Cooking Crush as Prem, the latter featuring new music collaborations with Off Jumpol.

More recently, Atthaphan took on roles in The Trainee (2024) as Ryan and appeared in the variety series Fully Booked (2024). In 2025, he co-starred as Ozone in the fantasy series Leap Day, which concluded its run in June 2025. He also played as Jira in Burnout Syndrome.

=== Film ===
Year	Title	Role	Notes	Ref.
2008	Pirate of the Lost Sea	Fluke	Support role	
2009	Slice	Nut Boonla	Support role	
2011	Forget Me Not	Tharn	Main role	
2012	407 Dark Flight	Tee	Guest role	
2014	O.T. The Movie	O	Support role	
2014	Bittersweet Chocolate	James	Main role	
2015	The Blue Hour	Tam	Main role	
2015	Love Love You	Gump	Main role	
2017	Playboy and the Gang of Cherry	James	Main role	
2025	Serpent Beauty	Kao	Main role	

=== Television series ===
Key
†	Denotes television productions that have not yet been released

Year	Title	Role	Notes	Ref.
2003	Benja Keta Kwarm Ruk	Pupa (young)	Support role	
2004	Fai Nai Wayu	Graigoon / Noi (young)	Guest role	
2004	Pha Mai	—N/a	Guest role	
2004	Poot Pitsawat	Ghost boy	Support role	
2004	Gomin	Gomin (young)	Main role	
2005	Kerd Tae Tom	—N/a	Support role	
2005	คนนี้แหละพ่อเรา This Person is our Father	One / Two (twins)	Main role	
2005	Chaloey Barb	—N/a	Guest role	
2006	Koh Kaya Sith	Phumin (young)	Support role	
2006	Thee Trakoon Song	Fuu (young)	Guest role	
2006	Sood Ruk Sood Duang Jai	Likit (young)	Guest role	
2007	Gong Jak Lai Dok Bua	Pariwat / Wat (young)	Guest role	
2007	Hoop Kao Kin Kone	Young Woraman	Guest role	
2008	Botan Gleep Sudtai	Danai (young)	Guest role	
2009	Khun Mae Jum Lang	Porto's classmate	Support role	
2009	Mae Ka Khanom Wan	Wacharawat (young)	Guest role	
2009	Jao Por Jum Pen Kub Jao Nu Ninja	Ninja	Main role	
2012	Fruits From Different Trees	X	Guest role	
2013	Baan Bor Kor Tag	Tin	Main role	
2014	ThirTEEN Terrors	Tam	Main role	
2015	Riddles ปริศนาอาฆาต Pritsana Akhat	Pachara	Guest role	
2015	Nong Mai Rai Borisut	Ghost	Guest role	
2016	Little Big Dream	—N/a	Guest role	
2016	Senior Secret Love: Puppy Honey	"Rome" Thanapat Pornprom	Main role	
2017	Senior Secret Love: Puppy Honey 2	"Rome" Thanapat Pornprom	Main role	
2017	Secret Seven	Liftoil	Main role	
2017	Teenage Mom: The Series	Dentist	Guest role	
2017	SOTUS S	Drunk boy	Guest role	
2018	The Gifted	"Punn" Taweesilp	Main role	
2018	Our Skyy	"Rome" Thanapat Pornprom	Main role	
2019	Theory of Love	Third	Main role	
2020	Club Sapan Fine	Ko	Main role (Ep. 6)	
2020	The Gifted: Graduation	"Punn" Taweesilp	Main role	
2020	I'm Tee, Me Too	"T-Rex" Watee Reuangritthiroj	Main role	
2020	The Shipper	—N/a	Guest role	
2020	Theory of Love: Special Episode "Stand By Me"	Third	Main role	
2021	Not Me	White / Black	Main role	
2022	The War of Flowers	Non / Nontree	Main role	
2022	Club Sapan Fine 2	Ko	Main role	
2022	The Three GentleBros	"Arty" Ashira Sutthakarn	Main role	
2023	Midnight Museum	Dome / Chan	Main role	
2023	Home School	Run	Main role	
2023	Cooking Crush	"Prem" Premmatat	Main role	
2024	The Trainee	"Ryan" Anawat	Main role	
2025	Leap Day	"Ozone" Anawin	Main role	
2025	Burnout Syndrome	Jira	Main role	
2026	Gunshot †	Mini	Main role	
TBA	Saran Wants You! †	"Ran" Saran	Main role	

=== Music video appearances ===
Year	Title	Artist	Label	Ref.
2017	"คนแบบไหนดี"; Secret Seven OST	PunPun Sutatta	GMMTV Records	
2018	"เข้าใจใช่ไหม"; Our Skyy OST	Fiat Pattadon	GMMTV Records	
2019	"พระเอกจำลอง (Fake Protagonist)"; Theory of Love OST	Getsunova	White Music	
2021	"ป่ะล่ะ (PALA)"	POKMINDSET	MINDSET MOB	
2021	"Not Me"; Not Me OST	KANGSOMKS	GMMTV Records	

== Discography ==
=== Singles ===
==== Collaborations ====
Year	Title	Label	Ref.
2019	"ความเงียบดังที่สุด (The Loudest Silence)" with Off Jumpol	GMMTV Records	
2020	"ไม่รักไม่ลง (Too Cute To Handle)" with Off Jumpol	GMMTV Records	
2020	"ตุ๊บๆ จุ๊บๆ OK!" with Off Jumpol, Krist Perawat, Singto Prachaya, Bright Vachirawit, Win Metawin	GMMTV Records	
2022	"กฎของแรงดึงดูด (The Law of Attraction)" with Off Jumpol, Krist Perawat, Singto Prachaya, Tay Tawan, New Thitipoom, Bright Vachirawit, Win Metawin	GMMTV Records	
2023	"Save All Memories In This House" with Off Jumpol, Earth Pirapat, Mix Sahaphap, Joong Archen, Dunk Natachai, Jimmy Jitaraphol, Sea Tawinan, Neo Trai, Louis Thanawin	GMMTV Records	
2023	"กอด กอด (Hugs)" with Off Jumpol, Tay Tawan, New Thitipoom, Pond Naravit, Phuwin Tangsakyuen, Gemini Norawit, Fourth Nattawat, Perth Tanpon, Chimon Wachirawit	GMMTV Records	
2024	"ข้างๆยังว่าง (Available)" with Off Jumpol	GMMTV Records	

==== Soundtrack appearances ====
Year	Title	Soundtrack	Label	Ref.
2022	"เข้าข้างตัวเอง (My Side)" with Off Jumpol	Not Me OST	GMMTV Records	
2023	"What's Zabb" with Off Jumpol	Cooking Crush OST	GMMTV Records	
2024	"ฝึกรัก (Love Training)"	The Trainee OST	GMMTV Records	
2025	"My Forever" with Off Jumpol	Burnout Syndrome OST	GMMTV Records	

== Fan meetings ==
Solo

Title	Date	Venue	Ref.
Our First Date: Gun Fan Sign in Shanghai	1 December 2024	Shanghai, China	
GMMTV Fan Event: Tokyo	14 December 2024	Animate Theater, Tokyo	
Because of You: Gun Fan Sign in Hangzhou	17 May 2026	Hangzhou, China	

Joint

Title	Date	Venue	Notes	Ref.
OffGun Fan Meeting in Korea	20 May 2017	Anyang Arts Center	with Off	
OffGun Fan Meeting in Taipei	12 August 2017	Liberty Square International Auditoriu	with Off	
OffGun Fan Meeting in Manila	10 February 2018	Teatrino Promenade, Greenhills Shopping Center	with Off	
OffGun Fun Night in Malaysia	1 September 2018	PJ Live Arts Centre	with Off	
OffGun Fan Meeting in Shenzhen	2 March 2019	The Panglin Hotel, Shenzhen	with Off	
OffGun Fan Meeting in Hong Kong	31 March 2019	KITEC LIVE	with Off	
OffGun Fan Meeting in Myanmar	18 May 2019	LOTTE Hotel Crystal Ballroom, Myanmar	with Off	
Theory of Love Fan Meeting in Taipei	22 June 2019	WESTAR	with Theory of Love cast	
OffGun Fan Meeting in Vietnam	29 June 2019	Hong Bang International University, Vietnam	with Off	
Our Skyy Fan Meeting in Taipei	21 Jul 2019	Taipei International Convention Center	with Off, Krist, Singto, Tay, New, Drake, Frank, Pluem, Chimon	
OffGun Fan Meeting in Korea	24 August 2019	Howon Art Hall, Korea	with Off	
Funtastic Babii: OffGun Fan Meeting in Thailand	21 September 2019	Chaengwatthana Hall, CentralPlaza Chaengwattana	with Off	
Our Skyy Fan Meeting in Myanmar	9 Nov 2019	Pullman Yangon Centrepoint Hotel, Myanmar	with Off, Krist, Singto, Tay, New, Drake, Frank, Pluem, Chimon	
Worldwide Live Fan Meeting: OffGun	June 2020	V LIVE	with Off	
OffGun Fan Meeting in Japan	24 September 2022	Yurakucho Asahi Hall, Yurakucho Mullion	with Off	
OffGun Fan Meeting in Singapore	20 November 2022	Simpor Junior Ballroom, Marina Bay Sands	with Off	
GMMTV Fan Day 2 in Osaka	25–26 February 2023	Dojima River Forum, Osaka	with Off	
OffGun Fan Meeting in Taipei	8 April 2023	Zepp New Taipei, Honhui Plaza	with Off	
OffGun Fan Meeting in Hong Kong	2 June 2023	Rotunda 3, KITEC	with Off	
OffGun Fan Meeting in Seoul	29 July 2023	New Millennium Hall, Konkuk University	with Off	
24th Thai Festival: Tokyo; OffGun Special Fan Meeting	9 May 2024	Yamano Hall, Tokyo	with Off	
OffGun Fan Meeting in Hong Kong	10 August 2024	AXA Dreamland, Go Park	with Off	
GMMTV Fan Day 7 in Cambodia	10 September 2023	Aeon Mall, Sen Sok City	with Off	
GMMTV Fan Day 11 in Seoul	22 June 2024	Guro-gu Community Center, Seoul	with Off	
GMMTV Fan Day 13 in Manila	6 July 2024	SM North EDSA Skydome	with Off	
The Trainee Final EP. Fan Meeting	15 September 2024	Siam Pavalai Royal Grand Theater, Siam Paragon	with The Trainee cast	
JIB Dream Fanmeet 4: JIB BL Festival	11 January 2025	Hilton Rome Airport Hotel, Rome	with Off	
Leap Day: First Screening	1 April 2025	SF World Cinema, CentralWorld	with Leap Day cast	
Leap Day: Final Screening	24 June 2025	SF World Cinema, CentralWorld	with Leap Day cast	
OffGun European Tour: OffGun Fan Meeting in Madrid	4 October 2025	Kinépolis Ciudad de la Imagen, Madrid	with Off	
OffGun European Tour: OffGun Fan Meeting in London	6 October 2025	The Clapham Grand, London	with Off	
OffGun European Tour: OffGun Fan Meeting in Paris	8 October 2025	La Palmeraie, Paris	with Off	
Burnout Syndrome: Begins	26 November 2025	Siam Pavalai Royal Grand Theater, Siam Paragon	with Burnout Syndrome cast	
Burnout Syndrome Final EP. Fan Meeting	4 February 2026	Siam Pavalai Royal Grand Theater, Siam Paragon	with Burnout Syndrome cast	
Gunshot: The First Shot	November 23, 2026	SF World Cinema, Centralworld	with Gunshot cast	

== Concerts ==
Title	Date	Venue	Notes	Ref.
Y I Love U Fan Party	3 September 2017	Thunder Dome, Muang Thong Thani	with Off, Krist, Singto, Earth, New, Sing, Tay, Got, Amp, Gun Achi	
Y I Love U Fan Party 2019 next to Ha Island Y	26-27 January 2019	Thunder Dome, Muang Thong Thani	with Off, Krist, Singto, Tay, New, Drake, Frank, Earth, Oaujun, Fiat, Guy, Nammon, Neo, Phuwin	
GMMTV Fantopia 2020	21-22 November 2020	Impact Arena, Muang Thong Thani	with Off	
Love Out Loud Fan Fest 2022	20 August 2022	Impact Arena, Muang Thong Thani	with Off, Krist, Singto, Tay, New, Bright, Win	
The Krist Elements Concert	21-22 October 2023	Union Hall, Union Mall	with Krist, Off, Singto, Tay, New, Gawin	
GMMTV Happy Weekend in Japan	24 February 2024	Tachikawa Stage Garden	with Off, Tay, New, Pond, Phuwin, Joong, Dunk, Jimmy, Sea, First, Khaotung, Gemini, Fourth, Perth, Chimon	
GMMTV Fan Fest 2024: Macau	8 December 2024	Galaxy Arena, Macau	with Off, Tay, New, Earth, Mix, Boun, Prem, Pond, Phuwin, Joong, Dunk, Jimmy, Sea, First, Khaotung, Milk, Love	
GMMTV Starlympics 2024	21 December 2024	Impact Arena, Muang Thong Thani	GMMTV Artists	
GMMTV Fan Fest 2025: Japan	13 January 2025	Tokyo Garden Theater, Tokyo	with Off, Krist, Singto, Tay, New, Pond, Phuwin, Jimmy, Sea, Gemini, Fourth	
PEBACA What A Concert in Bangkok	22 March 2025	Thunder Dome, Muang Thong Thani	with Off, Krist, Singto, Tay, New	
PEBACA What A Concert in Singapore	7 September 2025	D'Marquee Downtown East, Singapore	with Off, Krist, Singto, Tay, New	
PEBACA What A Concert in Japan	28 September 2025	Toyosu PIT, Tokyo	with Off, Krist, Singto, Tay, New	
PEBACA What A Concert in Manila	22 November 2025	Up theater, Manila, Philippines	with Off, Krist, Singto, Tay, New	
GMMTV Starlympics 2025	20 December 2025	Impact Arena, Muang Thong Thani	GMMTV Artists	
GMMTV Fan Fest 2026: Japan	21 February 2026	Tokyo Garden Theater, Japan	with Off, Krist, Singto, Tay, New, Boun, Prem, Pond, Phuwin, Joong, Dunk, Sky, Nani	
PEBACA What A Concert in Taipei	22 March 2026	Zepp New Taipei	with Off, Krist, Singto, Tay, New	
GMMTV Starlympics 2026	28 November 2026	Impact Arena, Muang Thong Thani	GMMTV Artists	
PEBACA Legacy Fam Concert	30–31 January 2027	BITEC LIVE	with Off, Krist, Singto, Tay, New, Nanon, Namtan, Gawin, Nani, JingJing, Prem, Sky, Bonnie, Phuwin	

== Awards and nominations ==
Year	Award	Category	Nominated Work	Result	Ref.
2010	7th Khom Chat Luek Award	Best Supporting Actor	Slice	Nominated	
2010	7th Starpics Award	Best Supporting Actor	Slice	Nominated	
2010	18th Thai Movie & Entertainment Criticism Club Award	Best Supporting Actor	Slice	Nominated	
2010	7th Chalerm Thai Award	Best Supporting Actor	Slice	Won	
2010	Movie Max Award	Rising Star of the Year	Slice	Nominated	
2010	7th HAMBURGER Award	Best Supporting Actor	Slice	Nominated	
2010	19th Thailand National Film Association Award	Best Supporting Actor	Slice	Nominated	
2011	Bioscope Award	Performance of the Year	Slice	Won	
2015	13th Starpics Award	Best Lead Actor	The Blue Hour	Nominated	
2015	6th Thai Film Director Association	Best Lead Actor	The Blue Hour	Nominated	
2015	25th Thailand National Film Association Award	Best Lead Actor	The Blue Hour	Nominated	
2015	24th Thai Movie & Entertainment Criticism Club Award	Best Lead Actor	The Blue Hour	Nominated	
2015	21st Chéries-Chéris Film Award (French)	Best Actor in Feature Film	The Blue Hour	Won	
2015	29th MIX Copenhagen Award (Danish)	Best Lead Actor	The Blue Hour	Won	
2015	37th Mardi Gras Film Festival (Australia)	Best Actor	The Blue Hour	Nominated	
2015	25th Fusion International Film Festival (Norway)	Best Actor	The Blue Hour	Nominated	
2017	Great Super Star Award	The Couple of the Year	Senior Secret Love: Puppy Honey	Nominated	
2018	KAZZ Awards	Young Male of the Year	Senior Secret Love: Puppy Honey	Nominated	
2018	7th Daily Dara Award	Male Rising Star	Senior Secret Love: Puppy Honey	Won	
2018	Maya Awards	Best Couple (with Off Jumpol)	Senior Secret Love: Puppy Honey	Nominated	
2018	Award "Rud Bundit"	Outstanding Acting in Drama Series	The Gifted	Won	
2018	Great Super Star Award	Best Couple (with Off Jumpol)	—N/a	Nominated	
2018	Artist Federation of Thailand	Youth and Person of the Year	—N/a	Won	
2019	2nd Line TV Awards	Best Couple (with Off Jumpol)	Our Skyy	Won	
2019	2nd Line TV Awards	Best Fight Scene	The Gifted	Won	
2019	KAZZ Awards	Popular Young Male	—N/a	Nominated	
2019	KAZZ Awards	Popular Vote	—N/a	Nominated	
2019	KAZZ Awards	Favorite Male Kazz Magazine (with Off Jumpol)	—N/a	Won	
2019	8th Dara Daily Award	Popular Vote	—N/a	Nominated	
2019	7th HOWE Award	Best Couple (with Off Jumpol)	—N/a	Won	
2019	Maya Awards	Best Couple (with Off Jumpol)	—N/a	Won	
2019	24th Asian Television Awards	Best Actor in a Supporting Role	The Gifted	Won	
2019	Thailand Headlines Person of The Year Award	Best Couple (with Off Jumpol)	—N/a	Won	
2020	Great Super Star Award	Best Couple (with Off Jumpol)	—N/a	Won	
2020	3rd Line TV Awards	Best Couple (with Off Jumpol)	Theory of Love	Won	
2021	KAZZ Awards	Best Actor of the Year	—N/a	Nominated	
2021	1st Siam Series Awards	Best Actor	—N/a	Nominated	
2022	Maya Entertain Awards 2022	Best Couple (with Off Jumpol)	Theory of Love	Nominated	
2022	10th Thailand Zocial Awards	Best Entertainment on Social Media – Actor	—N/a	Nominated	
2022	KAZZ Awards	Best Scene (with Off Jumpol)	Not Me	Nominated	
2023	Seoul International Drama Awards 2023	Outstanding Asian Star	Midnight Museum	Won	
2025	FEED x KHAOSOD Awards 2025	Actor of the Year (Drama/Series)	Leap Day	Nominated	
2025	Asian Academy Creative Awards	Asian Academy Creative Award for Best Actor in a Supporting Role (National Winner)	Leap Day	Won	
2025	30th Asian Television Awards	Best Actor in a Supporting Role	Leap Day	Won	
