= Cooking Crush =

2023 Thai television series

- Official series poster
- Thai: อาหารเป็นยังไงครับหมอ
- Genre: Boys' love; Romantic comedy
- Based on: Love Course! Suea Gown Rak Suea Cook Rap by iJune4S
- Directed by: Sakon Wongsinwiset
- Starring: Jumpol Adulkittiporn; Atthaphan Phunsawat
- Country of origin: Thailand
- Original language: Thai
- No. of episodes: 12

Production
- Executive producer: Sataporn Panichraksapong
- Running time: 48–57 minutes
- Production companies: GMMTV; Gmo Films

Original release
- Network: GMM25; WeTV
- Release: 26 November 2023 – 18 February 2024

Cooking Crush (Thai: อาหารเป็นยังไงครับหมอ; RTGS: Ahan Pen Yang Ngai Khrap Mo, lit. 'How's the Food, Doc?') is a 2023 Thai television series directed by Sakon Wongsinwiset (Golf), starring Jumpol Adulkittiporn (Off) and Atthaphan Phunsawat (Gun).

Adapted from the novel Love Course! Suea Gown Rak Suea Cook Rap (Love Course! เสื้อกาวน์รุกเสื้อกุ๊กรับ) by iJune4S and produced by GMMTV together with Gmo Films, it was announced during the GMMTV2023: Diversely Yours event held on 22 November 2022. The series aired on GMM25 and WeTV from 26 November 2023 and concluded on 18 February 2024.

== Synopsis ==
Prem (Atthaphan Phunsawat), a third-year culinary student, loses confidence in his abilities after his professor rejects his cooking. He crosses paths with Ten (Jumpol Adulkittiporn), a medical student who is nearly fainting from hunger. Drawn by the smell of Prem's food, Ten approaches him and receives a meal originally intended for a stray dog. This initial interaction prompts Ten to hire Prem for private cooking lessons. During these lessons, the two develop romantic feelings for each other, though their growing connection soon encounters various personal and emotional conflicts.

== Cast and characters ==
=== Main ===
- Jumpol Adulkittiporn (Off) as Todsatid Wannaphongjinda (Ten)
  - Suphach Tawsagun (Boky) as child Ten (Ep. 1–2, 5)
  - Suriyawit Thanomchaisanit (Yochi) as teen Ten (Ep. 5, 8)
- Atthaphan Phunsawat (Gun) as Premmatat (Prem)
  - Suppakit Wongsa (Shogun) as young Prem (Ep. 1–2, 5)

=== Supporting ===
- Trai Nimtawat (Neo) as Akkhi Phloengphirotchotchuangchatchawan (Fire)
- Ochiris Suwanacheep (Aungpao) as Natthanan Chuchok (Dynamite)
- Chatchawit Techarukpong (Victor) as Chang Ma
- Jaruwat Cheawaram (Dome) as Samsee
- Warawut Poyim (Tum) as Metha
- Bhasidi Petchsutee (Lookjun) as Jane
- Pimwalee Phunsawat (Pim) as Paeng
- Sukhapat Lohwacharin (Suam) as Bun (3B gang)
- Piyamas Monyakul (Pu) as Prem's grandmother
- Chokchai Charoensuk as Ten's father

=== Guest ===
- Yanee Laoviriyarat (Cherry) as Mai (Ep. 1–2)
- Apinya Khaosabai (Kook) as Fire's mother (Ep. 1–4, 8, 11–12)
- Phechsuk Thawatchai (Nuree) as Ball (3B gang) (Ep. 1, 3, 11)
- Nawaporn Boonmee (Porsri) as Babe (3B gang) (Ep. 1, 3, 11)
- Jareuk Sriaroon as Prem's instructor (Ep. 1, 3)
- Lapisara Intarasut (Apple) as Ten's late mother (Ep. 2, 5, 8)
- Pattarawalai Wongsinwises (Pong) as Dynamite's neighbour (Ep. 3)
- Pokchat Thiamchai (Gyp) as Charlotte (Ep. 3, 5)
- Pruek Sumpantaworaboot as Super Monster Chef judge (Ep. 10–11)
