= Deep (2021 film) =

2021 Thai film

- Directed by: Sita Likitvanichkul; Jetarin Ratanaserikiat; Apirak Samudkidpisan; Thanabodee Uawithya; Adirek Wattaleela
- Written by: Sita Likitvanichkul; Kittitat Nokngam; Jetarin Ratanaserikiat; Apirak Samudkidpisan; Wisit Sasanatieng; Thanabodee Uawithya
- Starring: Panisara Rikulsurakan; Kay Lertsittichai; Supanaree Sutavijitvong; Krit Jeerapattananuwong; Warisara Jitpreedasakul; Philaiwan Khamphirathat
- Production company: Transformation Films
- Distributed by: Netflix
- Release date: 16 July 2021
- Running time: 101 minutes
- Country: Thailand
- Language: Thai

Deep (known in Thai as โปรเจกต์ลับ หลับ เป็น ตาย, Project Lap Lap Pen Tai 'secret project: sleep, be, die') is a 2021 Thai mystery thriller film produced by Transformation Films and released on Netflix. The film was written and directed by a team of students from Bangkok University, with Transformation Films providing support.

The film was directed by Sita Likitvanichkul, Jetarin Ratanaserikiat, Apirak Samudkidpisan, Thanabodee Uawithya and Adirek Wattaleela; written by Sita Likitvanichkul, Kittitat Nokngam, Jetarin Ratanaserikiat, Apirak Samudkidpisan, Wisit Sasanatieng and Thanabodee Uawithya; and stars Krit Jeerapattananuwong, Warisara Jitpreedasakul and Philaiwan Khamphirathat.

== Plot ==
Medical student Jane lives with her delinquent younger sister, June, while taking care of their grandmother. Her intense studying schedule, household duties, and struggle to pay debt prompts her to become an insomniac. Jane's professor, Nichcha, suggests she participate in research held by a German pharmaceutical company.

The company's head scientist, Hans Miller, explains that their experiment, dubbed Deep, will be conducted in three levels and aims to harvest a brain chemical called Qratonin, which induces wakefulness in humans. This is achieved through implanting a microchip in the subject's nape. After being promised a fitting reward and signing an NDA, Jane is implanted and given a watch to monitor her Qratonin level. Hans warns that the chip will induce cardiac arrest if she ever falls asleep for more than 60 seconds before she reaches 100% Qratonin levels.

She encounters fellow students and Deep subjects, party-goer Win, gamer nerd Peach, and popular student Cin. After reaching the end of Deep's first level, they each receive their rewards. As they grow closer, Cin confides that she has a stalker. The group name themselves Non-Non (meaning no-sleep in French and Thai). They decided to proceed to the second level of Deep, offering an even bigger reward provided they stay awake longer. Each of them becomes increasingly delirious, experiencing visual and auditory hallucinations. They realize that more students partake in the experiment and their sleepiness slows their Qratonin level rises slower. To cope with this, they held a party at Peach's house. At one point, Cin is shocked to discover that Peach is her stalker, and fell unconscious before being resuscitated. After Cin's near death experience, the group finishes the second level and quits the experiment, seemingly breaking up. Jane witness a student who died due to the Deep.

After her grandmother suffers a stroke, Jane discovers that June also participates in the Deep. She confronts Hans, who threatens that June's third level of Deep has started and he won't remove the chip unless she gathers her friends back for the experiment. Cin and Peach initially refuse, although they later rejoin the group.

Non-Non, with June, participate in Deep's third level and plan to stay awake with the help of Professor Nichcha. By day six, they start to experience vivid hallucinations and the situation descends into chaos, prompting Jane to seek out Professor Nichcha for help. Jane instead discovers that the company was a front, Hans Miller is an actor, and Professor Nichcha is the mastermind behind Deep. Nichcha locks Jane and the group in her patient room. She tries to extract Win's chip after he fell unconscious and seemingly died, only for him to revive and attack her. It is revealed that the group, after shutting Nichcha's surveillance, fakes Win's death using CCL injection to trick her.

Professor Nichcha explained that she started Deep to revive her comatose lover, Jed — who fell from a building due to sleep deprivation as shown at the beginning of the movie — using the harvested Qratonins. She states that she never meant harm to her subjects, showing that she implanted herself with multiple chips. Desperate, Nichcha drugs Jane. After a brief struggle, the group revives Jane and incapacitates the professor.

In the aftermath, Professor Nichcha is arrested and all her implanted chips are extracted from the subjects. Each of the Non-Non mends their personal lives and is reunited as friends.

== Cast ==
- Panisara Rikulsurakan as Jane
- Kay Lertsittichai as Win
- Supanaree Sutavijitvong as Cin
- Krit Jeerapattananuwong as Peach
- Warisara Jitpreedasakul as June
- Dujdao Vadhanapakorn as Professor Nichcha
- Wongsakorn Rassamitat as Win's father
- Bhumibhat Thavornsiri as Jed
- Philaiwan Khamphirathat
- Kim Waddoup
