= The Shipper =

2020 Thai television series

- Official series poster
- Thai: The Shipper – จิ้นนายกลายเป็นฉัน
- Genre: Fantasy; Romantic comedy; Coming-of-age
- Created by: GMMTV
- Directed by: Aticha Tanthanawigrai
- Starring: Kanaphan Puitrakul; Sureeyares Yakares; Pawat Chittsawangdee; Pusit Dittapisit; Kanyarat Ruangrung; Benyapa Jeenprasom
- Opening theme: "แคร์ไกลไกล" (Khae Klai Klai) by La-Ong-Fong
- Ending theme: "ฉันเป็นของเธอทุกวัน" (Chan Pen Khong Thoe Thuk Wan) by Arun Asawasuebsakul
- Country of origin: Thailand
- Original language: Thai
- No. of episodes: 12

Production
- Production companies: GMMTV; Parbdee Taweesuk

Original release
- Network: GMM 25
- Release: 22 May – 7 August 2020

The Shipper (Thai: The Shipper – จิ้นนายกลายเป็นฉัน; The Shipper – Chin Nai Klai Pen Chan; lit. 'the shipper: imagining you, becoming me') is a 2020 Thai television series starring Kanaphan Puitrakul (First), Sureeyares Yakares (Prigkhing), Pawat Chittsawangdee (Ohm), Pusit Dittapisit (Fluke), Kanyarat Ruangrung (Piploy) and Benyapa Jeenprasom (View). Directed by Aticha Tanthanawigrai and produced by GMMTV together with Parbdee Taweesuk, the series follows a high school yaoi writer who, after an accident, wakes up to find herself in the body of one of the boys she is shipping in her novels. The series was one of the twelve television series for 2020 showcased by GMMTV during their New & Next event on 15 October 2019. It premiered on GMM 25 and LINE TV on 22 May 2020, airing every Friday at 21:30 ICT and 23:00 ICT, respectively. The series concluded on 7 August 2020.

== Synopsis ==
High school student Pan (Sureeyares Yakares) is an ardent shipper of her boy seniors, model student Kim (Kanaphan Puitrakul) and tough guy Way (Pusit Dittapisit), despite the fact that the two are only best friends and are both straight. She and her fellow Kim-Way shipper Soda (Kanyarat Ruangrung) are writing a yaoi novel about the two boys. Soon, things turn ugly for Pan and Soda, when Kim and Way gets involved in a fight with a bully who had read the novel and teased the duo for being homosexuals. Way, who is already in probation for previous offenses, gets expelled. Way's sassy girlfriend Phingphing (Benyapa Jeenprasom) learns about the Kim-Way yaoi and commands her friends to find and bring its authors to her.

Overcome with guilt, Pan comes clean to Kim about the yaoi novel, but the kind-hearted Kim offers to drive her home. Pan and Kim get into an accident on the road and find themselves in limbo, where they meet Yommathut (Note: Thai: ยมทูต, RTGS: yommathut, lit. "psychopomp" or "angel of death") (Watchara Sukchum), the angel of death. The deity has appeared before them to lead them to the afterlife, though the two young mortals learn that they are not dead yet. Realizing her blunder, Yommathut sends them back to the mortal world but, in the process, she accidentally switches their bodies. Pan (Kanaphan Puitrakul) wakes up in a hospital only to find herself in Kim's body.

Clueless on how to fix the mistake, Yommathut promises Pan that she will find a way to swap her and Kim back. Meanwhile, Pan has pretend to be Kim and has to make sure no one will find out the truth. But the body swap has become a chance for her to make her and Soda's Kim-Way ship become a reality.

== Cast and characters ==
=== Main ===
- Kanaphan Puitrakul (First) as Kimhan Dhamrong-rattanaroj (Kim) / Pan (in Kim's body)

an intelligent model student who represents the school in competitions; Khet's elder brother, and Way's close friend. Kim is being shipped with Way by the yaoi writers Pan and Soda, primarily due to their close relationship. Along with Pan, he meets Yommathut in limbo after their near-fatal vehicular accident. Due to the deity's mistake, his body becomes the receptacle for Pan's soul.
Pan (in Kim's body): After the accident, Pan returns to the mortal world in Kim's body. She then uses this as a chance to make her Kim-Way ship come true while making sure the people around her remain unaware that she is not Kim.

- Sureeyares Yakares (Prigkhing) as Panithita Thanachoknavakul (Pan)

a yaoi writer who, along with Soda, ardently ships her seniors Kim and Way; Khet's close friend, and Soda's partner. In reality, Pan admires Way but she only wants Way to be with Kim, whom she considers to be a good person. Along with Kim, she meets Yommathut in limbo after their near-fatal vehicular accident. Due to the deity's mistake, her soul returns to the human world only to be placed inside Kim's body.

- Pawat Chittsawangdee (Ohm) as Khemachat Dhamrong-rattanaroj (Khet)

Pan's close friend, and Kim's younger brother. Khet has a passion for hairdressing and frequently skips class to work part-time in a salon. Knowing that both Kim and Way are straight (and that Way already has a girlfriend), Khet keeps on interrupting and distracting Pan from writing her Kim-Way yaoi story. He has a crush on Pan.

- Pusit Dittapisit (Fluke) as Watit Wongwannakij (Way)

a student who is in probation due to his frequent involvement in fist fights; Kim's close friend and Phingphing's boyfriend. A tough kind of guy, Way is a former gang member. Unbeknownst to him and Phingphing, he is being shipped with Kim by his juniors Pan and Soda.

- Kanyarat Ruangrung (Piploy) as Sarocha (Soda)

a yaoi writer who, along with Pan, ardently ships her seniors Kim and Way; Pan and Khet's classmate. Soda is Pan's partner in writing the Kim-Way story.

- Benyapa Jeenprasom (View) as Phingphing

Pan, Khet, and Soda's classmate. Phingphing is Way's girlfriend. Unknowing at first about the Kim-Way ship, she soon discovers the story and vows to find and punish its writers.

=== Supporting ===
- Watchara Sukchum (Jennie) as Yommathut

a deity who guides newly deceased souls to the afterlife. Yommathut meets Kim and Pan, who both enter limbo after their near-fatal vehicular accident, and mistakes them to be newly deceased souls. After realizing her blunder, she sends them both back to the mortal world but, in the process, accidentally puts Pan's soul in Kim's body.

- Warinda Damrongphon (Dada) as Teacher Angkana

Kim and Way's class adviser and math teacher; Kim's secret girlfriend. Angkana is a fierce disciplinarian at school but becomes childish and coquettish when going out with Kim.

- Waratchaya Ophat-sirirat as Nun

a member of Phingphing's clique

- Chinnaphat Charat-uraisin as Somza

a member of Phingphing's clique

- Photcharaphon Thepsukdi as Pongpol (Off)

a bully who, after reading Pan and Soda's Kim-Way yaoi, teased the real life Kim and Way of being homosexuals.

- Wirawit Charoensupphasutthirat as Pipe

Off's henchmen

- Phiradon Si-osot as X

Off's henchmen

=== Guest ===
- Jumpol Adulkittiporn (Off) (Ep. 12)
- Atthaphan Phunsawat (Gun) (Ep. 12)

== Episodes ==
No.	Title	Original release date
1	"Noah's Ark"	22 May 2020
High school yaoi writers Pan and Soda ardently ship their boy seniors Kim and Way despite the fact that they are only close friends and are both straight. Soon, their fictional work does more harm than good, leading to Way being expelled. Pan personally apologizes to Kim, ready to take responsibility, but the kind-hearted Kim offers to drive her home. Pan and Kim get into an accident on the road. Soon, Pan wakes up in a hospital to a shocking surprise.
2	"Being Kim"	29 May 2020
Pan finds herself in Kim's body, and Yommathut reveals she had accidentally switched her and Kim's bodies. The death angel warns Pan she has to kill her if she fails to pretend being Kim. Pan tries her best at acting like Kim and, later, realizes a sad truth about her being an avid shipper. Meanwhile, Kim's younger brother Khet keeps a scrutinizing eye over "Kim"'s strange behavior.
3	"Men's Universe"	5 June 2020
Yommathut leaves for Milan to find a way to restore Pan and Kim to their original bodies. As Pan continues living inside Kim's body, her stereotypes about boys and girls get broken. Soda receives an offer of friendship from Way's sassy girlfriend Phingphing, but with ugly consequences. After a dinner date with Way, Pan learns of a stupefying revelation about Kim and his teacher Miss Angkana.
4	"Unexpected Person"	12 June 2020
Pan forces herself to date with Miss Angkana, who transforms herself from the strict, fierce teacher to Kim's bubbly, babyish girlfriend. Angkana reveals about an exam leak at school and asks her help in retrieving her lost flash drive, a gift from the real Kim, which contains her own exam questionnaires. As Pan searches for Angkana's missing flash drive and the culprit behind the exam leak, she gets the know things she never knew before about Khet and Kim.
5	"Friendship-per"	19 June 2020
Pan is devastated upon discovering Angkana's lost flash drive in Kim's room, along with other flash drives Angkana had lost (and most probably had been stolen by Kim) in previous years. Realizing that Kim might not be the great person she thought he is, Pan believes she has to make things right. Soon, the secret student-teacher affair is severed, nearly everyone in school hears about "Kim" and Way getting into a fight, and Soda witnesses the Kim-Way story in their writing platform erasing by itself.
6	"Love Squarangle"	26 June 2020
Things have gone haywire as Pan still remains inside Kim's body. Soda thinks "Kim" likes her and she feels she might have to break the shipper's rule not to like their ship. Worse, Khet keeps seeing Pan in "Kim"'s actions and worries he might be developing feelings for his elder brother. In her haste to fix the damage, Pan makes a grave mistake.
7	"Observer to Player"	3 July 2020
Yommathut is furious when Pan accidentally revealed the truth to Soda (and to an eavesdropping Khet). But her death threat was only a joke; she trusts Pan can still keep the truth from being leaked to everyone. As Pan and Soda seek for possible ways to reverse the body swap, Way divulges to Khet the reason why he broke up with Phingphing.
8	"If two men ride on horse..."	10 July 2020
By chance, Pan successfully reverses the body swap: she returns alive in her own body but Kim's body drops unconscious. Khet demands an explanation, but Pan shies away from telling him the whole truth. The jealous Phingphing employs Off and his henchmen to eliminate Kim but she puts Way in danger, instead. To save Way, Pan resolves on a risky plan.
9	"...one must ride behind."	17 July 2020
Pan returns to Kim's body to help Khet and Way fight Off and his gang, but she discovers later on that this second body swap seems to be irreversible. Khet remains hesitant to confess his feelings to Pan. As Way starts making moves on her, Pan realizes whom Way's love is really for.
10	"Theory of Everything"	24 July 2020
Pan realizes that Way is in love with the real Kim, not her. Much to Khet's concern, she plans to separate Way from Kim by revealing Kim's exam theft to him. But in the end, she gets to know the truth and understands the sad lives of Kim, Way and Khet.
11	"Lost & Found"	31 July 2020
Pan's original body suddenly becomes unresponsive. As doctors try to revive it, Yommathut reveals to Pan her heart-rending discovery on Kim's true whereabouts. She offers Pan the freedom to make the ultimate, life-changing choice: either to save herself or to sacrifice herself for Kim's sake.
12	"Ship and Shipper"	7 August 2020
Pan finally reveals herself to Way and gives him a chance to say goodbye to Kim's body. She learns from Yommathut an alternative way to return to her original body. She realizes she needs Khet to accomplish it, but she has to do it quickly before her body ultimately perishes.

== Soundtrack ==
Song title	Romanized title (RTGS)	English Translation	Artist	Ref.
แคร์ไกลไกล	Khae Klai Klai	"Caring From Afar"	La-Ong-Fong	
ฉันเป็นของเธอทุกวัน	Chan Pen Khong Thoe Thuk Wan	"I Belong to You Everyday"	Arun Asawasuebsakul (Ford)	

== Reception ==
=== Viewership ===
- In the table below, the blue number represents the lowest ratings and the red number represents the highest ratings.
- N/A denotes that the rating is not known.

Episode No.	Timeslot (UTC+07:00)	Air date	Average audience share	Ref.
1	Friday 9:30 pm	22 May 2020	0.170%	
2	Friday 9:30 pm	29 May 2020	0.123%	
3	Friday 9:30 pm	5 June 2020	0.148%	
4	Friday 9:30 pm	12 June 2020	0.265%	
5	Friday 9:30 pm	19 June 2020	0.151%	
6	Friday 9:30 pm	26 June 2020	0.150%	
7	Friday 9:30 pm	3 July 2020	—N/a	—N/a
8	Friday 9:30 pm	10 July 2020	—N/a	—N/a
9	Friday 9:30 pm	17 July 2020	—N/a	—N/a
10	Friday 9:30 pm	24 July 2020	—N/a	—N/a
11	Friday 9:30 pm	31 July 2020	—N/a	—N/a
12	Friday 9:30 pm	7 August 2020	—N/a	—N/a
Average			— ^{2}	

^1 Based on the average audience share per episode.
^2 Due to some ratings not recorded, the exact average rating is unknown.

== International broadcast ==
- Philippines – The series was among the five GMMTV television series acquired by ABS-CBN Corporation, as announced by Dreamscape Entertainment on 10 September 2020. All episodes were made available for streaming via iWantTFC on 28 December 2020.
