= Senior Secret Love =

2016–17 Thai television series

- Official series poster
- Thai: รุ่นพี่ Secret Love
- Genre: Romantic comedy
- Created by: GMMTV
- Directed by: Weerachit Thongjila
- Starring: Korapat Kirdpan; Kanyawee Songmuang; Vorakorn Sirisorn; Nachjaree Horvejkul; Jumpol Adulkittiporn; Atthaphan Phunsawat; Toni Rakkaen; Sakonrut Woraurai; Jirakit Kuariyakul
- Opening theme: "Hatdog" (Ruk Tua Ang Bang Na) by Rangsan Panyaruan
- Ending theme: "พูดว่ารักในใจ" (Pood Wah Ruk Nai Jai) by Worranit Thawornwong
- Country of origin: Thailand
- Original language: Thai
- No. of seasons: 2
- No. of episodes: 34: 6 (My Lil Boy); 6 (Puppy Honey); 6 (Bake Me Love ); 8 (My Lil Boy 2); 8 (Puppy Honey 2)

Production
- Producer: Sataporn Panichraksapong
- Running time: 60 minutes
- Production companies: GMMTV; Housestories 8

Original release
- Network: One31; LINE TV
- Release: 7 February 2016 – 6 May 2017

Related
- Our Skyy (Ep. 1)

Senior Secret Love (Thai: รุ่นพี่ Secret Love; Roon Pee Secret Love) is a 2016–2017 Thai television series each presented through one of the three segments entitled My Lil Boy, Puppy Honey and Bake Me Love.

Directed by Weerachit Thongjila and produced by GMMTV together with Housestories 8, the premiere segment My Lil Boy was broadcast on 7 February 2016 to 13 March 2016 and followed by Puppy Honey (20 March 2016 to 24 April 2016), both airing on Sundays on One31 at 14:00 ICT and 15:00 ICT, respectively. Bake Me Love (1 May 2016 to 5 June 2016) meanwhile aired on Sundays on One31 and LINE TV at 15:00 ICT and 17:00 ICT, respectively.

The series was renewed for a second season starting with My Lil Boy 2 which was broadcast on 11 December 2016 to 29 January 2017 and followed by Puppy Honey 2 (18 March 2017 to 6 May 2017). Both segments were also aired on Sundays on One31 and LINE TV.

== Season 1 (2016) ==
=== My Lil Boy ===
==== Synopsis ====
Belle (Kanyawee Songmuang) is known for her beauty throughout the whole school and she has always been successful getting the man that she wants. Yet her charms don't seem to work when it comes to a junior boy named S (Korapat Kirdpan) that she has taken a liking to. Determined to get S, Belle asks for the help of her two best friends.

==== Main ====
- Korapat Kirdpan (Nanon) as S
- Kanyawee Songmuang (Thanaerng) as Belle

==== Supporting ====
- Paveena Rojjindangam (Mildy) as Pang
- Ingkarat Damrongsakkul (Ryu) as Taewin
- Nawat Phumphotingam (White) as Pe
- Supakan Benjaarruk (Nok) as Ne
- Sawanya Liangprasit (Bell) as Aom
- Ploynira Hiruntaveesin (Kapook) as Orn

=== Puppy Honey ===
==== Synopsis ====
Emma (Nachjaree Horvejkul), a 1st year Arts student and at heart, loves animals, especially cats. Unfortunately, an incident from Emma's past has made her terrified of dogs. Emma unfortunately meets Porsche (Vorakorn Sirisorn) and Pik (President of an animal club), who is a fourth year in Veterinary school. Porsche and his friend Pik invite (basically force) Emma and her friend Rome to become part of their club. But what happens when Emma and Rome start having feelings for the seniors?

==== Main ====
- Vorakorn Sirisorn (Kang) as Porsche
- Nachjaree Horvejkul (Cherreen) as Emma
- Jumpol Adulkittiporn (Off) as Pick
- Atthaphan Phunsawat (Gun) as Rome

==== Supporting ====
- Phurikulkrit Chusakdiskulwibul (Amp) as Eau
- Phakjira Kanrattanasood (Nanan) as Ping
- Harit Cheewagaroon (Sing) as Din

==== Guest role ====
- Ployshompoo Supasap (Jan) as Fan (Ep. 1)

=== Bake Me Love ===
==== Synopsis ====
Mielle (Sakonrut Woraurai), a baking blogger, falls in love at first sight with Kim (Toni Rakkaen), but her feelings for him change when he insults her baking skills and tells her she should not blog about baking since she clearly doesn't know how to bake well. To get revenge, Mielle crashes Kim's date with his ex-girlfriend, Lita (Oranicha Krinchai) who is still in love with Kim. Things become more complicated when Mielle finds out that Kim is her new next door neighbor and they accidentally share a kiss.

==== Main ====
- Toni Rakkaen as Kim
- Sakonrut Woraurai (Four) as Mielle

==== Supporting ====
- Weerayut Chansook (Arm) as San
- Krittanai Arsalprakit (Nammon) as Aek
- Leo Saussay as Rose
- Oranicha Krinchai (Proud) as Lita
- Sutthipha Kongnawdee (Noon) as Wira

== Season 2 (2016–2017) ==
=== My Lil Boy 2 ===
Promotional poster for Senior Secret Love: My Lil Boy 2

==== Synopsis ====
Belle is enjoying her life as a first-year student in university, while S is still in high school. However, now that Belle's attention towards him seem to have decreased, S realizes he has feelings for the girl. S is now the one chasing after Belle and he will do his best to win her back. But it's not as easy as he thinks.

==== Main ====
- Korapat Kirdpan (Nanon) as S
- Kanyawee Songmuang (Thanaerng) as Belle
- Jirakit Kuariyakul (Toptap) as Boss

==== Supporting ====
- Paveena Rojjindangam (Mildy) as Pang
- Wachirawit Ruangwiwat (Chimon) as Toy
- Ingkarat Damrongsakkul (Ryu) as Taewin
- Ploynira Hiruntaveesin (Kapook) as Orn
- Nara Thepnupa as Mayrin

==== Guest role ====
- Nawat Phumphotingam (White) as Pe

=== Puppy Honey 2 ===
Promotional poster for Senior Secret Love: Puppy Honey 2

==== Synopsis ====
Porsche has moved away to pursue an internship, leaving Emma behind. Causing stress on them and their relationship. Porsche meets Friend, a happy and bright girl and Emma meets Night (Perawat Sangpotirat), her brother's friend from high school. Pick is still confused over his sexuality and feelings for Rome. However, Din, an ex-member of Porsche's cat and dog club is becoming extremely close to Rome. Pick insists he doesn't have feelings for Rome, but he feels jealous when Rome is with Din.

==== Main ====
- Vorakorn Sirisorn (Kang) as Porsche
- Nachjaree Horvejkul (Cherreen) as Emma
- Jumpol Adulkittiporn (Off) as Pick
- Atthaphan Phunsawat (Gun) as Rome

==== Supporting ====
- Perawat Sangpotirat (Krist) as Night
- Harit Cheewagaroon (Sing) as Din
- Phurikulkrit Chusakdiskulwibul (Amp) as Eau
- Tipnaree Weerawatnodom (Namtan) as Friend

== Series overview ==
Season	Episodes		Originally released	
Season	Episodes		First released	Last released
1	18	My Lil Boy	February 7, 2016	March 13, 2016
1	18	Puppy Honey	March 20, 2016	April 24, 2016
1	18	Bake Me Love	May 1, 2016	June 5, 2016
2	16	My Lil Boy 2	December 11, 2017	January 29, 2017
2	16	Puppy Honey 2	March 18, 2017	May 6, 2017
