= Burnout Syndrome =

2025–26 Thai television series

- Official series poster
- Thai: ภาวะรักคนหมดไฟ
- Genre: Boys' love; Romantic drama
- Directed by: Anucha Boonyawatana
- Starring: Jumpol Adulkittiporn; Atthaphan Phunsawat; Jirawat Sutivanichsak
- Country of origin: Thailand
- Original language: Thai
- No. of episodes: 10

Production
- Executive producer: Sataporn Panichraksapong
- Running time: 48 minutes
- Production companies: GMMTV; Chamade Film

Original release
- Network: GMM25; iQIYI
- Release: 26 November 2025 – 4 February 2026

Burnout Syndrome (Thai: ภาวะรักคนหมดไฟ; Phawa Rak Khon Mot Fai, lit. The State of Loving Someone Who's Burn Out) is a 2025 Thai television series starring Jumpol Adulkittiporn (Off), Atthaphan Phunsawat (Gun) and Jirawat Sutivanichsak (Dew). Directed by Anucha Boonyawatana and produced by GMMTV together with Chamade Film, it was announced as one of the television series of GMMTV for 2025 during their "GMMTV2025: Riding the Wave" event on November 26, 2024. The series aired on GMM25 and iQIYI from November 26, 2025, to February 4, 2026.

== Synopsis ==
Koh Korawik (Jumpol Adulkittiporn), a business pioneer who dislikes socializing, meets Jira (Atthaphan Phunsawat), a jobless young artist who is looking for his identity. Feeling a strange connection, Koh decides to hire Jira to play 'Mr. K', a business negotiation representative, in exchange for Jira's seemingly easy condition: Koh must be a model for Jira's artwork. However, as their bodies get closer, the boundary between inspiration and desire blurs... Their relationship, which started out as superior and subordinate, develops into a complex and contentious affair. Koh is the one who inspires Jira's work, while Jira is the one who sparks the fire in his heart.

As the fire intensifies, Koh understands that it could not be just the two of them who are prepared to burn together. Pheem (Jirawat Sutivanichsak), a close friend, also participates in this game of love with his heart prepared to bet as well. Despite their closeness, Jira is still unsure about his relationship with Koh, himself, and Pheem. What type of affection does he truly need?

== Cast and characters ==
=== Main ===
- Jumpol Adulkittiporn (Off) as Koh
- Atthaphan Phunsawat (Gun) as Jira
- Jirawat Sutivanichsak (Dew) as Pheem

=== Supporting ===
- Thasorn Klinnium (Emi) as Ing
- Chayapol Jutamas (AJ) as Mawin
- Thinnaphan Tantui (Thor) as Ben
- Grisana Punpeng (Num) as Thames

== Awards and nominations ==
Award nominations for Burnout Syndrome
Year	Award	Category	Nominee(s)	Result	Ref.
2026	ContentAsia Awards 2026	Best LGBTQ+ Programme Made in Asia	Burnout Syndrome	Nominated	
2026	Y Entertain Awards 2026	Best BL Series of the Year	Burnout Syndrome	Nominated	
2026	Y Entertain Awards 2026	Best Creative Team of the Year	Burnout Syndrome	Nominated	
2026	Y Entertain Awards 2026	Leading Boys' Love Star of the Year	Jumpol Adulkittiporn	Nominated	
2026	Y Entertain Awards 2026	Y Star on Spotlight of the Year	Jirawat Sutivanichsak	Nominated	
2026	31st Asian Television Awards	Best Scriptwriting	Anucha Boonyawatana, Jittinat Ngamnak and Sethinun Jariyavilaskul	Nominated	
