= Not Me (TV series) =

2021–22 Thai television series

- Official series poster
- Thai: เขา...ไม่ใช่ผม
- Genre: Action
- Directed by: Anucha Boonyawatana
- Starring: Atthaphan Phunsawat; Jumpol Adulkittiporn
- Country of origin: Thailand
- Original language: Thai
- No. of episodes: 14

Production
- Running time: 40–50 minutes
- Production company: GMMTV

Original release
- Network: GMM 25; AIS PLAY
- Release: 12 December 2021 – 20 March 2022

Not Me (Thai: เขา...ไม่ใช่ผม; RTGS: Khao... Mai Chai Phom, lit. He... Is Not Me) is a 2021–2022 Thai action television drama series, starring Jumpol Adulkittiporn (Off) and Atthaphan Phunsawat (Gun). The plot revolves around White disguising himself as his twin Black in order to discover who betrayed him, and who attacked him and put him in a coma. Directed by Anucha Boonyawatana (Nuchie) and produced by Thai production company GMMTV, this series is one of sixteen television series of the corporation for 2021 during their GMMTV 2021: The New Decade Begins event on 3 December 2020. It aired every Sunday at 20:30 (ICT) on GMM25 and the streaming platform AIS Play simultaneously. It was featured on Teen Vogue's best dramas of 2022 list.

== Synopsis ==
Identical twins Black and White (Atthaphan Phunsawat) share an emotional bond that is so strong that they feel each other’s pain. To lessen their bond, their parents divide them from each other in their early teenage years. After graduating from university abroad, White returns to Bangkok to follow in his father’s footsteps by preparing to become a diplomat. However, shortly after his arrival in Thailand, the bond to his twin makes itself known once more as White suffers excruciating pain when Black gets beaten into a coma. In order to find out who hurt his brother, White takes on his identity and infiltrates Black’s gang made up of political activists - a group of university students turned vigilantes, who put their life on the line for a fairer Thai society.

Increasingly, White finds himself questioning his own complicity in the conservative and unjust dynamics surrounding him. Along the way, his teammate, and Black’s rival, Sean (Jumpol Adulkittiporn) goes from suspecting “Black’s" sudden empathy and level-headedness to falling in love with this new version of him. With imprisonment and death a constant threat on their lives, White finds himself sparking a wide-spread uprising against capitalistic greed, corruption and civil rights infringements.

== Cast and characters ==
=== Main ===
- Atthaphan Phunsawat (Gun) as Black / White
- Jumpol Adulkittiporn (Off) as Sean

=== Supporting ===
- Tanutchai Wijitvongtong (Mond) as Gram
- Kanaphan Puitrakul (First) as Yok
- Harit Cheewagaroon (Sing) as Tod
- Gawin Caskey (Fluke) as Dan
- Phromphiriya Thongputtaruk (Papang) as Gumpa
- Rachanun Mahawan (Film) as Eugene
- Bhasidi Petchsutee (Lookjun) as Namo

== Reception ==
=== Thailand television ratings ===
| Episode No. | Timeslot (UTC+07:00) | Air date | Average audience share | Ref. |
|---|---|---|---|---|
| 1 | Sunday 8:30 pm | 12 December 2021 | 0.143% | |
| 2 | Sunday 8:30 pm | 19 December 2021 | 0.092% | |
| 3 | Sunday 8:30 pm | 26 December 2021 | 0.101% | |
| 4 | Sunday 8:30 pm | 9 January 2022 | 0.2% | |
| 5 | Sunday 8:30 pm | 16 January 2022 | 0.2% | |
| 6 | Sunday 8:30 pm | 23 January 2022 | 0.102% | |
| 7 | Sunday 8:30 pm | 30 January 2022 | 0.150% | |
| 8 | Sunday 8:30 pm | 6 February 2022 | 0.065% | |
| 9 | Sunday 8:30 pm | 13 February 2022 | 0.088% | |
| 10 | Sunday 8:30 pm | 20 February 2022 | 0.147% | |
| 11 | Sunday 8:30 pm | 27 February 2022 | 0.052% | |
| 12 | Sunday 8:30 pm | 6 March 2022 | 0.167% | |
| 13 | Sunday 8:30 pm | 13 March 2022 | 0.162% | |
| 14 | Sunday 8:30 pm | 20 March 2022 | 0.098% | |
| Average | | | 0.126%^{1} | |

^1 Based on the average audience share per episode.

== Soundtrack ==
| Song title | Artist | Ref. |
|---|---|---|
| "NOT ME" | Tanatat Chaiyaat (Kangsom) | |
| "เข้าข้างตัวเอง (MY SIDE)" | Atthaphan Phunsawat (Gun), Jumpol Adulkittiporn (Off) | |
| "Still In Love With You" | Crane Technique (Paul Wheatley) | |
