= The Trainee =

2024 Thai television series

- Official series poster
- Thai: ฝึกงานเทอมนี้ รักพี่ได้มั้ย
- Genre: Drama; Romantic comedy
- Written by: Thanaporn Petcharat; Kirati Kumsat
- Directed by: Thachai Komolphet; Sasinan Pattana
- Starring: Atthaphan Phunsawat; Jumpol Adulkittiporn; Tawinan Anukoolprasert; Kanyarat Ruangrung; Benyapa Jeenprasom; Poon Mitpakdee
- Country of origin: Thailand
- Original language: Thai
- No. of episodes: 12

Production
- Executive producer: Sataporn Panichraksapong
- Running time: 45 minutes
- Production companies: GMMTV; Parbdee Taweesuk

Original release
- Network: GMM25; Viu
- Release: 30 June – 15 September 2024

The Trainee (Thai: ฝึกงานเทอมนี้ รักพี่ได้มั้ย; Fuek Ngan Term Ni Rak Phi Dai Mai, lit. This Semester's Internship, Can I Love You?) is a 2024 Thai television series starring Atthaphan Phunsawat (Gun), Jumpol Adulkittiporn (Off), Tawinan Anukoolprasert (Sea), Kanyarat Ruangrung (Piploy), Benyapa Jeenprasom (View) and Poon Mitpakdee. Directed by Thanaporn Petcharat alongside Kirati Kumsat and produced by GMMTV together with Parbdee Taweesuk, it was announced as one of the television series of GMMTV for 2024 during their GMMTV2024: UP&ABOVE Part 1 event held on October 17, 2023. This series aired on GMM25 and Viu from June 30, 2024, to September 15, 2024.

== Synopsis ==
Ryan (Atthaphan Phunsawat), a young man with a passion for using his brain and hands to change the world in a 2-minute commercial, has the opportunity to intern as an assistant director at Good Pick production house. He meets Jane (Jumpol Adulkittiporn), an assistant director who is assigned to be a mentor for him. On just the first day, Jane turns a passionate Ryan into a nobody because he neither teaches, orders, nor cares about Ryan at all, no matter how much Ryan tries to show himself. Ryan shares about his suffering with his mentor to his fellow interns in the same batch, including Ba-Mhee (Kanyarat Ruangrung) in the AE (Account Executive) department and Tae (Tawinan Anukoolprasert) in the editing department, a couple who chooses to intern at the same company because they want to be together, also Pah (Poon Mitpakdee) in the art department and Pie (Benyapa Jeenprasom) in the production department.

On just the first day, Ryan also learns that the working world is not like the images he had dreamed of, but he decides to fight on. Even though Jane doesn't care, he tries his best to fight until Jane starts to trust him and assigns small tasks. One day, Ryan falls in love towards Jane so he sets a goal to win Jane's heart in three months. After all of this, what will happen to the interns and their relationship with their mentors?

== Cast and characters ==
=== Main ===
- Atthaphan Phunsawat (Gun) as Ryan Anawat
- Jumpol Adulkittiporn (Off) as Jirapat Khunkhao (Jane)

=== Supporting ===
- Tawinan Anukoolprasert (Sea) as Tae Thanat
- Kanyarat Ruangrung (Piploy) as Ba-Mhee Benyapha
- Benyapa Jeenprasom (View) as Gulasatree Sansopa (Pie)
- Poon Mitpakdee as Pramote Boonkoet (Pah)
- Ploynira Hiruntaveesin (Kapook) as Judy Jarinporn
- Niti Chaichitathorn (Pompam) as Baimon
- Nimit Lugsamepong (Bobby) as Jo
- Thasorn Klinnium (Emi) as Ink (Ryan's sister)

=== Guest ===
- Apivich Rinthapoln (Jade) as Ryan's father (Ep. 1–2, 4, 10)
- Wattana Chumthong (Ton Koon) as Wan (Ep. 1, 3–4, 6–7, 10–11)
- Sarayut Phetsamrit (Eddy) as Mu (Ep. 1–4, 7–10, 12)
- Chotipat Suthadsanasoung (Jeng) as Tao-hu (Ep. 1, 8)
- Jira Yangyeun (Jay) as Tu (Ep. 2)
- Patipat Sumon (Tong) as printer service technician (Ep. 2–3)
- Pakamon Daraprarom (Sand) as Prang (Ep. 2–3, 7–8, 10)
- Theerachai Naewpuwanon (Ake) as Ball (Ep. 2–3, 10)
- Maneesida Hatthakij (Aim) as Ja (Ep. 2, 5, 10, 12)
- Watcharapong Kanjanakrit (River) as Jao (Ep. 3)
- Natkharin Tankaew (Khopkhet) as extra (Ep. 3)
- Piyanuch Yodchum as aunty extra (Ep. 3)
- Tharapong Ruengsuksud (Wat) as art team member (Ep. 3, 7, 10, 12)
- Kusuma Teppharak (Pong) as accounting manager (Ep. 4–6, 9–10, 12)
- Maneerat Kam-Uan (Ae) as Joy (Ep. 6–7, 11–12)
- Phongsathorn Padungktiwong (Green) as Nine (Ep. 9, 11–12)
