= Wednesday Club =

2023 Thai television series

- Official series poster
- Thai: คนกลางแล้วไง
- Genre: Teen drama; Coming-of-age
- Based on: ตุ๊กตาแต้มสี (Tukkata Taem Si) by Sunantha (สุนันทา)
- Directed by: Chainarong Tampong
- Starring: Pawat Chittsawangdee; Hirunkit Changkham; Rachanun Mahawan; Kanyarat Ruangrung; Phuwin Tangsakyuen; Kay Lertsittichai; Kittiphop Sereevichayasawat
- Country of origin: Thailand
- Original language: Thai
- No. of episodes: 12

Production
- Executive producer: Sataporn Panichraksapong
- Running time: 43 minutes
- Production companies: GMMTV; Keng Kwang Kang Waisai

Original release
- Network: GMM25; Viu
- Release: 6 November – 12 December 2023

Wednesday Club (Thai: คนกลางแล้วไง; RTGS: Khon Klang Laeo Ngai) is a Thai coming-of-age teen drama television series directed by Chainarong Tampong (K), starring Pawat Chittsawangdee (Ohm), Hirunkit Changkham (Nani), Rachanun Mahawan (Film), Kanyarat Ruangrung (Piploy), Phuwin Tangsakyuen, Kay Lertsittichai, and Kittiphop Sereevichayasawat (Satang). Adapted from the novel ตุ๊กตาแต้มสี (Tukkata Taem Si) by Sunantha (สุนันทา) and produced by GMMTV together with Keng Kwang Kang Waisai, it was announced as one of the television series of GMMTV for 2023 during their "GMMTV2023: Diversely Yours" event held on November 22, 2022. This series aired on GMM25 and Viu from November 6 to December 12, 2023.

== Synopsis ==
Wednesday Club is a club that brings together seven middle children who feel rejected and ignored by their families. The members include Kong (Ohm Pawat), Palee (Nani Hirunkit), Tam (Film Rachanun), May (Piploy Kanyarat), Kul (Phuwin Tangsakyuen), Mac (Kay Lertsittichai), and Pheem (Satang Kittiphop). To maintain their friendship, they establish a strict rule that members must not fall in love with each other. However, this rule is eventually broken by complicated romantic relationships among the group. As their boundaries dissolve, it leads to secrets and hidden stories from their lives that no one wants revealed.

== Cast and characters ==
=== Main ===
- Pawat Chittsawangdee (Ohm) as Kong
- Hirunkit Changkham (Nani) as Palee
- Rachanun Mahawan (Film) as Tam
- Kanyarat Ruangrung (Piploy) as May
- Phuwin Tangsakyuen as Kul
- Kay Lertsittichai as Mac
- Kittiphop Sereevichayasawat (Satang) as Pheem

=== Supporting ===
- Kejmanee Wattanasin (Pin) as Venus
- Sakonrut Woraurai (Four) as Mink (Phali's sister)
- Nuttanan Khunwat (Earth) as Worrawat
- Weerayut Chansook (Arm) as Kan (Kong's brother)
- Phromphiriya Thongputtaruk (Papang) as Karn (Mink's husband)
- Chayapol Jutamas (AJ) as Wang Chao
- Chayakorn Jutamas (JJ) as Ma Han
- Thinnaphan Tantui (Thor) as Top
- Warut Brown (Bob) as Jes
- Praekwan Phongskul (Bimbeam) as Kanya (Kong's sister)
- Teepakron Kwanboon (Prom) as Proton
- Puttipong Jitbut (Chokun) as Kat

=== Guest ===
- Nutchapon Rattanamongkol (Nut) as Khanin
- Sawanee Utoomma (Iang) as Tam's grandmother
- Kittipol Kesmanee (Pu) as Thachai
