= Vasu Sangsingkeo =

Thai actor, host and singer (born 1967)

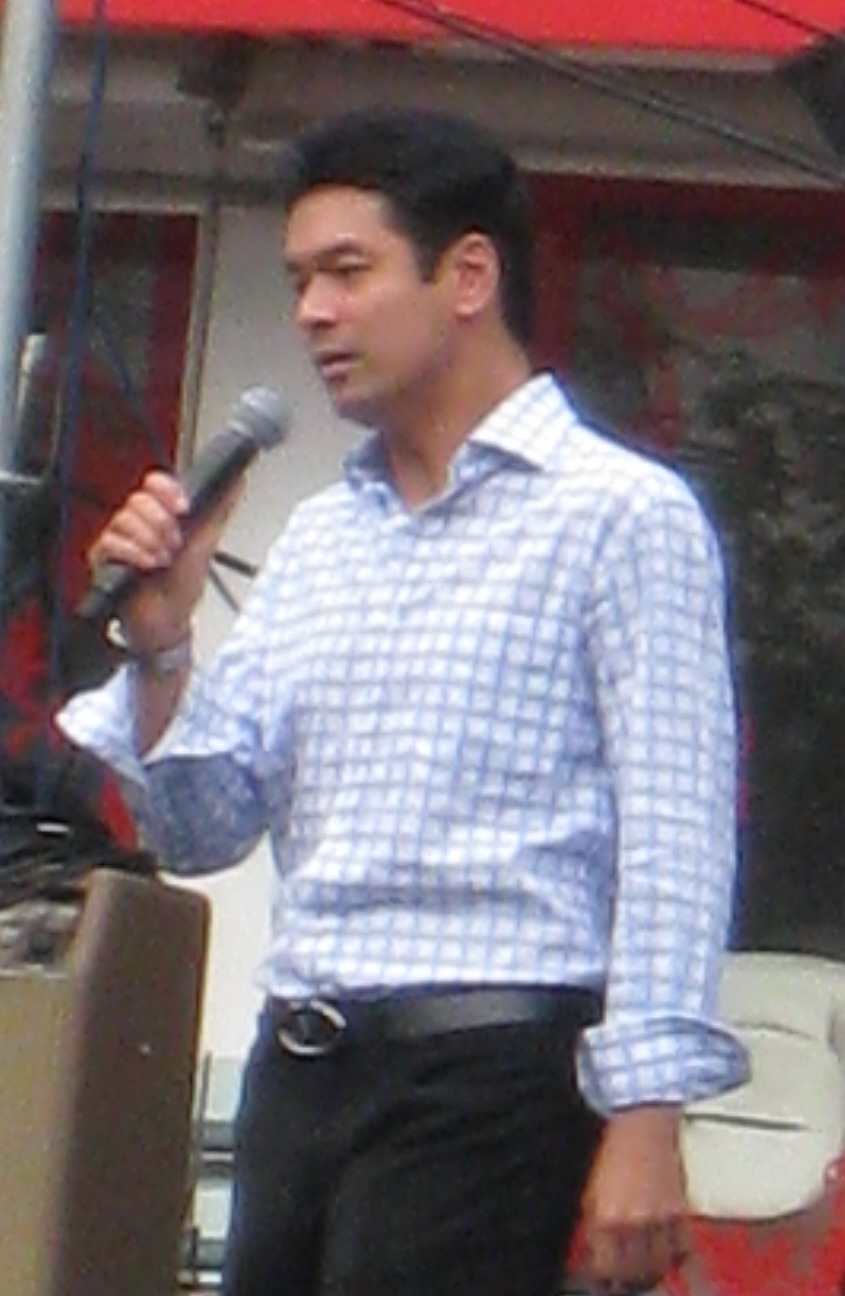
- Born: Vasu Sangsingkeo; December 29, 1967 (age 58); Thailand
- Occupations: Actor, host, singer
- Height: 1.70 m (5 ft 7 in)

Vasu Sangsingkeo (also known as Jib Ror.Dor., Nickname: Jeep; born December 29, 1967) is a Thai actor, host and singer.

== Biography ==
Vasu Sangsingkeo (Nickname Jeep) born December 29, 1967, son of Vitoon Sangsingkeo and Sudacha Sangsingkeo Graduate from Kasetsart University Laboratory School, Triam Udom Suksa School and Chulalongkorn University.

== Works ==
=== Host ===
- Parliament around the world (2008)
- Hot talk by Vasu (2009–2010)
- Sound Track in Married of Prince William & Kate (2011)
- Station help flood (2011)
- Teen superstar (2011)
- Reform Thailand (2011)
- New 5 Page 1 (2012)
- Quote of Sufficiently (2012)
- Return Politic Thailand (2013–2014)

=== Music ===
- Jib Ror.Dor. (1986)

=== Music video ===
- Oye oye (1988)

== Honours ==
- 2009 – Order of the Crown of Thailand
