= Return Man (2023 web series) =

- ยอดรัก นักทวงคืน
- Genre: Romcom, Action
- Written by: Kritmongkol Pienthong (Games); BitterSweet; Nakarin Narkpreecha (Joe)
- Directed by: Kritmongkol Pienthong (Games)
- Starring: Chayanit Chansangavej; Teeradetch Metawarayut
- Country of origin: Thailand
- Original language: Thai
- No. of episodes: 12

Production
- Production location: Thailand
- Cinematography: Nattapol Niemklun
- Running time: 45 minutes
- Production company: B.Brave Entertainment Hub

Original release
- Network: Viu
- Release: February 8, 2023

Return Man is a Thai Viu Original series starring Teeradetch Metawarayut and Chayanit Chansangavej. The show was released every Wednesday and Thursday on Viu from February 8, 2023.

== Synopsis ==
“Return Man” is a private detective company owned by Yodyuth, claiming they are able to 100% successfully return everything to owners. Of course, it comes with the huge rate fee.

Pribprao comes to "Return Man" to look for her cat. Not only getting back the cat, "Return Man" even help her take revenge on her ex-boyfriend who stole the cat. Pribprao decides to work in the company, becoming the apprentice of Yodyuth. She is sent assigned to various missions. And eventually, Yodyuth let her become a part of "Return Man".

== Cast ==
- Pat Chayanit Chansangavej as Pribprao
- Alek Teeradetch Metawarayut as Yodyuth
- Na Naphat Vikairungroj as Metha
- Fiat Patchata Janngeon as Buai
