= Pusit Dittapisit =

Thai actor (born 1997)

- ภูสิษฐ์ ดิษฐพิสิษฐ์
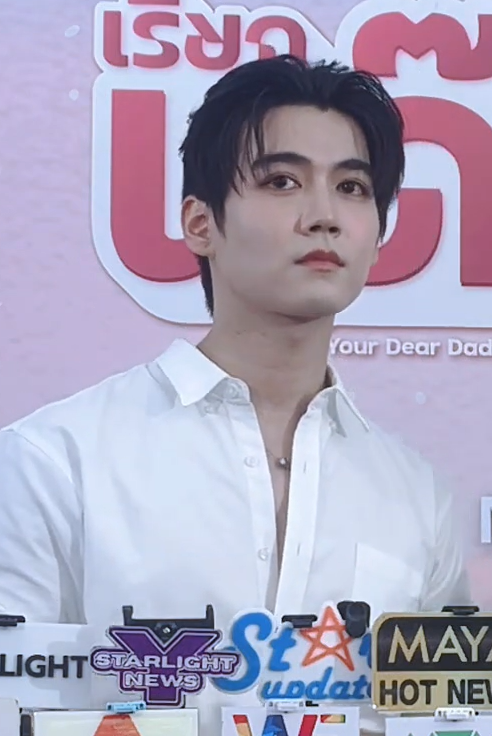
- Pusit in April 2026
- Born: 8 August 1997 (age 29); Thailand
- Occupation: Actor
- Years active: 2020–present
- Known for: The Shipper; Enchanté; A Boss and a Babe; Our Skyy 2; My Secret of Seer; Your Dear Daddy

Pusit Dittapisit (Thai: ภูสิษฐ์ ดิษฐพิสิษฐ์; born 8 August 1997), nicknamed Fluke (Thai: ฟลุ๊ค), is a Thai actor. He became known for starring in the GMMTV series The Shipper (2020). He is also recognized for his roles in BL dramas such as Enchanté (2022), A Boss and a Babe (2023), Our Skyy 2 (2023), and My Secret of Seer (2025). In 2026, he stars in the BL series Your Dear Daddy.

== Biography ==
In 2020, Fluke gained recognition for his role as Way in the series The Shipper, broadcast by GMMTV. In 2022, he appeared in the BL series Enchanté as Natee. In 2023, he played Thi in A Boss and a Babe, a role he reprised in Our Skyy 2.

In 2025, he portrayed Wayu in My Secret of Seer. In 2026, he was cast as the lead character Sila in the BL series Your Dear Daddy.

== Filmography ==
=== Television series ===
Year	Title	Role	Network	Notes	Ref.
2020	The Shipper	Way	GMM 25	Main role	
2020	The Gifted: Graduation	Windsurf	GMM 25	Guest role (Ep. 8–9, 11–13)	
2020	Friend Zone 2: Dangerous Area	Blue	GMM 25	Guest role (Ep. 12, 14–15)	
2020	Wake Up Ladies: Very Complicated	Mayom	GMM 25	Guest role (Ep. 2–3)	
2022	Enchanté	Natee	GMM 25	Supporting role	
2022	Oops! Mr. Superstar Hit on Me	Nadol	GMM 25	Supporting role	
2022	The Warp Effect	Army	GMM 25	Supporting role	
2023	A Boss and a Babe	Thi	GMM 25	Supporting role	
2023	Our Skyy 2	Thi	GMM 25	Supporting role, A Boss and a Babe	
2024	My Precious The Series	Lin's groom	GMM 25	Guest role	
2025	My Secret of Seer	Wayu	Channel 3 HD	Supporting role	
2026	Your Dear Daddy	Sila	MCOT HD	Main role	

=== Film ===
Year	Title	Role	Notes
2023	My Precious	Lin's groom	Supporting role
