= A Love So Beautiful (disambiguation) =

A Love So Beautiful is a 2017 Chinese streaming television series.

A Love So Beautiful may also refer to:

- A Love So Beautiful (South Korean TV series), a 2020 TV series
- A Love So Beautiful (Thai TV series), a 2024 TV series
- A Love So Beautiful (album), a 2017 compilation album by Roy Orbison
- "A Love So Beautiful", a song by Roy Orbison from the 1988 album Mystery Girl
