= Jo Hye-joo =

South Korean model and actress (born 1995)

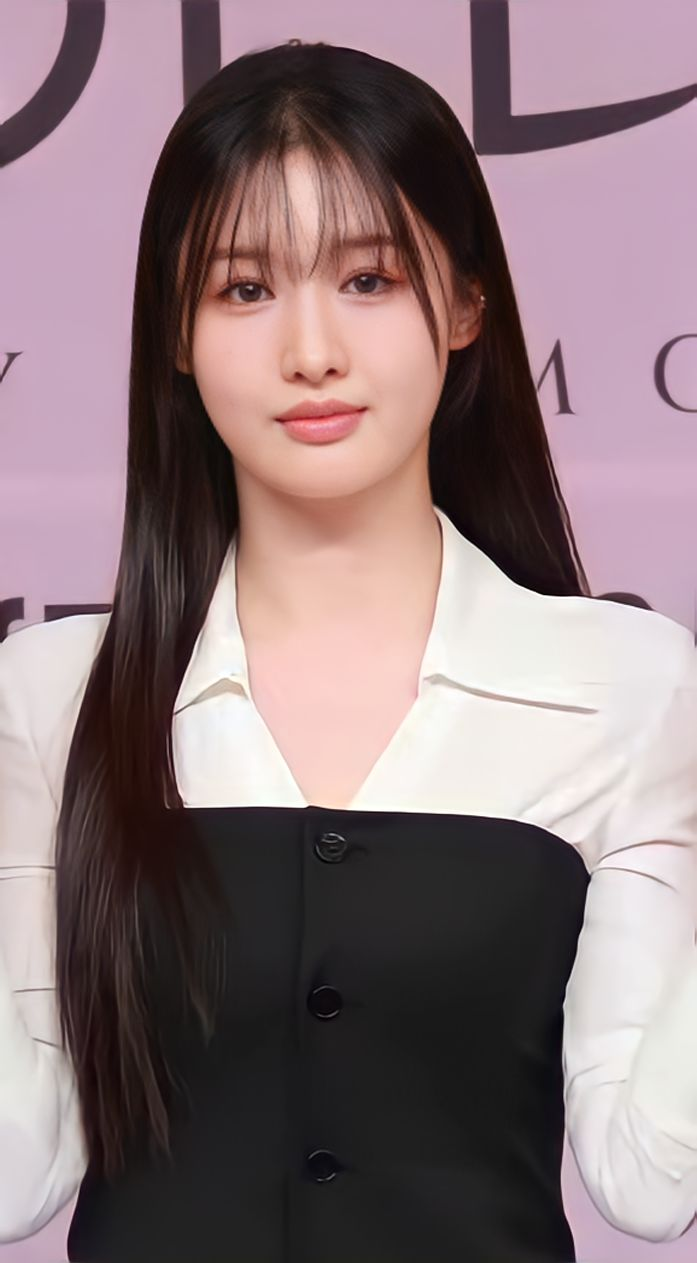
- Jo in November 2023
- Born: April 18, 1995 (age 31); Seoul, South Korea
- Other name: Cho Hye-joo
- Education: Chung-Ang University
- Occupations: Actress; model
- Years active: 2017–present
- Agents: YG; YG KPlus; MAA
- Height: 170 cm (5 ft 7 in)

Korean name
- Hangul: 조혜주
- Hanja: 曹慧朱
- RR: Jo Hyeju
- MR: Cho Hyeju

Jo Hye-joo (Korean: 조혜주; born April 18, 1995) is a South Korean actress and model. She began her acting career with the 2017 film Wedding. She is best known for her roles in Search: WWW (2019) and the coming of age television series A Love So Beautiful (2020).

== Early life ==
Hye-joo was born on April 18, 1995, in South Korea. She graduated from Chung-Ang University.

== Career ==
=== 2017–present: Modelling and acting debut ===
Jo made her debut as a model under YG Entertainment and YG KPlus. She made her acting film debut in Wedding in 2017. She was cast as the lead in the web series Just Too Bored as Bae Ye-seul in 2018. She also had a cameo appearance in A-Teen. She played her second lead role in Just One Bite and Just One Bite 2.

She made a special appearance in Big Issue and in He Is Psychometric and the film Miss & Mrs. Cops. Her popularity rose after starring in the romance melodrama Search: WWW. Jo was starred in Kim Na-young's "To Be Honest" music video, which was released on June 9, 2019. She made a cameo appearance in the film The Man Standing Next followed by the television series Memorist as Yoo Seung-ho's sister.

It was announced that Jo will play the role of Kang Ha-yeong in A Love So Beautiful alongside Kim Yo-han, So Joo-yeon and Yeo Hoe-hyun. The drama is a coming-of-age drama based on the 2017 Chinese series of the same name, aired on Tencent Video, which is based on novel To Our Pure Little Beauty by Zhao Qianqian.

== Filmography ==
=== Film ===
Year	Title	Role	Notes	Ref.
2017	Wedding	Song Hoon's bride		
2019	Miss & Mrs. Cops	Soo Bin	Cameo appearance	
2020	The Man Standing Next	University student	Cameo appearance	

=== Endorsement ===
Year	Company	Brand	Notes
2019	BABA Group	The Beautiful Factor	30s / 43s
2020–2021	Olive Young	WAKEMAKE	Muse
2022	Unilever	AHC	
2024	Usentic	24SS	
2025	KD Investment	Dasique	
2025	PVCS	25FW	Campaign Model

=== Television series ===
Year	Title	Role	Notes	Ref.
2018	Just Too Bored	Bae Ye-seul		
2018	A-Teen	Do Ha-na's cousin	Cameo appearance (Ep. 16)	
2018	Just One Bite	Jeon Hee-sook	Seasons 1–2	
2019	Big Issue	Female Assistant Manager	Cameo appearance	
2019	He Is Psychometric	Student	Cameo appearance (Episode 1-3)	
2019	Search: WWW	Yoon Dong-joo		
2020	Memorist	Sung Ju-ran	Cameo appearance (Ep. 16)	
2020	A Love So Beautiful	Kang Ha-yeong		
2022	Reborn Rich	Jin Ye-jun		
2023	The Secret Romantic Guesthouse	Yoon Hong-joo		
2023	My Demon	Jin Ga-young		
2024	Dear Hyeri	Baek Hye-yeon		
2026	Spooky In Love	Cheon Ha-ri		

=== Music video appearances ===
Year	Title	Artist	Ref.
2019	"To Be Honest" (솔직하게 말해서 나)	Kim Na-young	

== Awards and nominations ==
Name of the award ceremony, year presented, category, nominee of the award, and the result of the nomination
Award ceremony	Year	Category	Nominee / Work	Result	Ref.
SBS Drama Awards	2023	Excellence Award, Actress in a Miniseries Romance/Comedy Drama	The Secret Romantic Guesthouse	Nominated	
