= Enigma (Thai TV series) =

2023 Thai television series

- Official series poster
- คน มนตร์ เวท
- Genre: Supernatural thriller
- Created by: Puchong Tuntisungwaragul; Patha Thongpan
- Screenplay by: Patha Thongpan; Jarinee Tanomyat
- Directed by: Patha Thongpan
- Starring: Metawin Opas-iamkajorn; Chanikarn Tangkabodee
- Country of origin: Thailand
- Original language: Thai
- No. of seasons: 1
- No. of episodes: 4

Production
- Executive producers: Darapa Chaysanguan; Sataporn Panichraksapong
- Production location: Thailand
- Cinematography: Supawat Morakotamporn; Tin Guyson (Unit B)
- Camera setup: Multi-camera
- Running time: 44-52 minutes
- Production companies: The One Enterprise; GMMTV; Parbdee Tawesuk

Original release
- Network: GMM25; Prime Video
- Release: 15 July – 5 August 2023

Related
- Enigma Black Stage (2025)

Enigma (Thai: Enigma – คน มนตร์ เวท, RTGS: Enigma – Khon Mon Wet) is a 2023 Thai television series starring Metawin Opas-iamkajorn (Win) and Chanikarn Tangkabodee (Prim). Directed by The Gifted and F4 Thailand director Patha Thongpan and produced by Parbdee Tawesuk. It aired every Saturday at 20:30 (ICT) on GMM25 and Prime Video, from July 15 until August 5, 2023. A sequel, Enigma Black Stage, premiered on July 26, 2025.

== Synopsis ==
Fa (Chanikarn Tangkabodee) is a 12th-grade student at Satrikurat School, one of the most prestigious educational institutions in the country. The school is renowned for its rigorous academic standards, which often cause students to become obsessively focused on grades and test scores. Fa is no exception to this rule. One day, a top student snaps under pressure and stabs a teacher, causing serious injury. While the school attributes this to academic stress, Fa suspects that there's more to the situation, as if her world is slowly revealing hidden cracks.

When additional strange events unfold, these anomalies appear to be connected to an enigmatic new teacher named Ajin (Metawin Opas-iamkajorn). At first glance, he seems baffled and clumsy, yet there's something about him that keeps Fa intrigued. Her deepening involvement in these mysteries leads her towards a world far more dangerous than she ever imagined. It's a world she'd always considered a mere figment of imagination, but she's beginning to realize that with enough belief, it might just become reality.

== Cast and characters ==
=== Main ===
- Metawin Opas-iamkajorn (Win) as Ajin Nakaritta

He comes across as the stereotypical geeky teacher, sporting glasses and messy hair, but there is an air of mystery surrounding him, something unsettling that lurks beneath his seemingly unremarkable exterior.

- Chanikarn Tangkabodee (Prim) as Farinda Panya-angkul

An inquisitive student who finds herself plagued by doubt as a series of unsettling incidents unfold within her school. Caught between curiosity and fear, she's determined to unravel the mysteries.

=== Supporting ===
- Kanyarat Ruangrung (Piploy) as Karatrat Kueawechachan (Namsine)

She is a top student like Fa who finds herself in imminent danger.

- Sureeyares Yakares (Prigkhing) as Yiwha Kamolkul

Fa's friend who exudes an aura of mystery and elusiveness that renders her unfathomable to others.

- Preeyaphat Lawsuwansiri (Earn) as Kaohom Aungkhana Phosobwisai

Fa's friend and also a popular girl in their high school.

=== Guest ===
- Manatsanan Wanicshataporn (Tammy) as Math
- Sasipa Tinboonchote as Wanruethai Khamnuengwitthaya
- Kunchaya Ratchadathirathat as Grace
- Nantapak Chalermbhuvadech as Namsine's mother
- Narin Saengmor as Security guard
- Somjai Junmoontree as Gangster
- Chalee Immak as School director
- Wacharin Anantapong (Rina) as Deputy director
- Watthana Rujirojsakul (Bom) as Chemistry teacher
- Kanitsorn Cherdkiatikul (Prang) as Biology teacher
- Nada Phakphoome as Examination teacher
- Amara Thongpan as Fa's mom (voice)
- Suttikan Prommaboon (Punn) as The girl (voice)
- Tipnaree Weerawatnodom (Namtan) as Anya
- Vachirawit Chivaaree (Bright) as Tul

== Episodes ==
| No. | Title | Directed by | Written by | Original release date |
|---|---|---|---|---|
| 1 | "Episode 1" | Patha Thongpan | Patha Thongpan & Jarinee Tanomyat | 15 July 2023 |
At school, a top student suddenly stabs her teacher with a pencil, shocking the entire campus. While the administration dismisses the incident as drug-induced psychosis and urges students to focus on exams, Fa grows suspicious. A mysterious substitute teacher named Mr. Ajin arrives, and after a strange encounter where Fa is mysteriously healed from a glass wound, she begins to question his identity. Determined to uncover the truth, investigates Ajin and discovers strange objects and tattoos connected to him. Her search leads to a terrifying encounter with a possessed security guard, but she’s saved by a mysterious figure she believes is Ajin in disguise. Fa later confronts Ajin, accusing him of being linked to the recent incidents. He knocks her unconscious and performs a magical ritual to lift a curse she had unknowingly been under. Ajin reveals that magic is real and that someone is targeting top students at the school using dark magic. As a magician working undercover, he enlists Fa’s help to uncover the truth behind the curses.
| 2 | "Episode 2" | Patha Thongpan | Patha Thongpan & Jarinee Tanomyat | 22 July 2023 |
Fa moves in with Ajin. When he drops her off far from school, students secretly photograph them, sparking rumors. To deflect suspicion, Ajin claims to be Fa’s uncle and has her play a voice note (enchanted by black magic) of her mother asking her to care for him. The class believes it, but Fa is furious and confronts him. Ajin reveals he’s not a teacher but an occultist on a mission and hands her a list of top students to monitor, including her ex-best friend Namsine. Fa later has a vision of vomiting blood and seeing spirits seize Namsine. She calls her, only to learn Namsine lied about being home and is investigating the school music room. Fa rushes to stop her just as Namsine finds a hanging doll and screams. Fa arrives in time, followed by Ajin, who spots a mysterious girl fleeing. Back home, Namsine agrees to skip school for her safety. Ajin sets up a surprise test to lure the culprit, believing them to be an amateur. During the test, Fa notices a girl who doesn’t belong to the group and follows her. The girl, Yihwa traps Fa in the restroom and attacks Ajin with salt and water, mistaking him for the threat. After a tense exchange, Ajin leaves and Fa and Yihwa compare notes on black magic. Meanwhile, Ajin decodes a magical symbol leading him to a cursed site in the forest. At the same time, a girl in a purple cape attacks the school, causing students to vomit blood. Yihwa collapses from a seizure, and Fa removes her protection charm to help. Once Yihwa recovers, Fa chases after the cloaked girl. Ajin reaches the cursed site and realizes the witch is far more powerful than expected. He warns Fa to stay away, but she falls into a magical illusion. Though she believes she’s in a fantastical realm, she’s still inside the school. The episode ends with Fa trapped in the illusion while the masked witch watches, her identity still unknown.
| 3 | "Episode 3" | Patha Thongpan | Patha Thongpan & Jarinee Tanomyat | 29 July 2023 |
A flashback reveals how Namsine, in a depressive state, received a message and a glass shard mask from an occult group, marking her descent into dark magic. During the chase, Fa drops her phone, cutting off communication. Ajin rushes back and saves her just in time, though Namsine escapes. At home, Fa treats Ajin’s wounds. When asked why she stayed silent despite knowing Namsine was the witch, Fa breaks down. To ease her mind, Ajin takes Fa out and later uses astral projection to help her process her emotions. In the astral realm, Fa opens up about her history with Namsine. Once close friends, their bond fractured after Fa witnessed Namsine’s mother physically abusing her. Haunted by guilt, Fa blames herself for not helping back then. Ajin explains the nature of black and white magic and the goals of the Enigma cult. The next day, he visits Namsine’s home and confronts her mother, who is also cursed. Realizing Namsine has already left to attack Fa, Ajin hurries to the school library.
| 4 | "Episode 4" | Patha Thongpan | Patha Thongpan & Jarinee Tanomyat | 5 August 2023 |
Namsine reveals her face, now carved with cult markings under the Enigma’s control. As she attacks, Ajin intervenes and battles her, discovering she’s stronger than expected. Despite this, he overpowers her, forcing her to flee into the forest. There, she realizes the curse has been lifted. Fa consoles her, and they reconcile, but the curse reactivates, compelling Namsine to harm herself. Ajin sacrifices himself to absorb the curse. Now cursed, Ajin turns on Fa, who escapes and contacts Yihwa. With help, Fa performs black magic to trap Ajin at the school pool. Using a ritual he once taught her, she purges the curse, saving him. Peace is restored. Namsine returns to school, and despite whispers from peers, Yihwa supports her. Fa throws a farewell party for Ajin, who agrees only if she leaves before midnight. As they part, Fa confesses her feelings and kisses him. Ajin casts a spell, making her fall asleep. She wakes up alone with a self-written report. Later, Fa and Namsine doubt their memories, until they see Ajin on the news with a celebrity, confirming their experiences were real. The celebrity is revealed to be part of the Enigma cult, along with Yihwa. The episode ends with Ajin and the cult leader staring at each other, hinting at a deeper conspiracy.

== Soundtrack ==
| No. | Title | Lyrics | Music | Artist | Length |
|---|---|---|---|---|---|
| 1. | "Time Don't Move" | Fleurs Douces | Fleurs Douces | Fleurs Douces | 03:46 |
| 2. | "Heart to a Stranger" | Fleurs Douces | Fleurs Douces | Fleurs Douces | 03:20 |
| 3. | "To Love You" | Ploypaworawan Praison | Jessy Covets | Prong Praison | 02:51 |
| 4. | "My Galaxy" | Gloria Tells | Gloria Tells | Gloria Tells | 03:16 |
| 5. | "Halo (Sing Me to Sleep)" | Linda Stenmark | Anders Lystell & Michael Stenmark | Loving Caliber | 02:40 |

== Production ==
In November 2022, Sataporn Panichraksapong, managing director of GMMTV, announced plans to invest 51% in Parbdee Taweesuk Co., Ltd. in an effort to grow its business model. This collaboration was expected to raise the potential to create and produce more quality series and increase the reach of Thai content to a wider audience around the world. Producers Kamthorn Lorjitramnuay, Puchong Tuntisungwaragul, and Patha Thongpa represent Parbdee in the signing.

Enigma is one of the television drama series produced by Parbdee that was showcased by GMMTV during their DIVERSELY YOURS event on November 22, 2022, at Union Hall Bangkok.

After a period of pre-production, filming officially started on February 20, 2023, and concluded after approximately four months, with the final day of filming taking place on May 31, 2023.

On July 8, 2023, a special episode featuring behind-the-scenes footage and an interview with the actors aired on GMM25.

The sequel Enigma Black Stage was announced at the GMMTV 2024 UP & ABOVE PART 1 event on October 18, 2023, at Union Hall Bangkok. Metawin Opas-iamkajorn reprised his role as Ajin. Enigma Black Stage aired in July 2025.

== International broadcast ==
| Country | Network | Ref |
|---|---|---|
| Indonesia | Prime Video Indonesia | |
| Philippines | Prime Video Philippines | |
| Singapore | Prime Video Singapore | |
| Malaysia | Prime Video Malaysia | |
| Vietnam | Prime Video Vietnam | |
| Cambodia | Prime Video Cambodia | |
| Brunei | Prime Video Brunei | |
| Myanmar | Prime Video Myanmar | |

== Reception ==
The hashtag #EnigmaSeries trended at the top spot in Taiwan, Vietnam, Malaysia, and Indonesia, and secured the second spot in Thailand and the Philippines after the trailer was released. The phrase "The Enigma Trailer" trended at number 11 worldwide on Twitter. On July 15, the day of its release, #EnigmaSeriesEP1 trended at number 1 on Twitter in five countries and number 4 worldwide. The tag accrued over 410K tweets.

== Awards and nominations ==
| Year | Award | Category | Recipient | Result | Ref. |
|---|---|---|---|---|---|
| 2023 | Asian Academy Creative Awards 2023 | Best Cinematography | Supawat Morakotamporn | Won | |
| 2023 | Asian Academy Creative Awards 2023 | Best Editing | Krich Towiwat | Won | |
| 2023 | Asian Academy Creative Awards 2023 | Best Promo Or Trailer | Enigma | Won | |
| 2023 | 28th Asian Television Awards | Best Cinematography | Supawat Morakotamporn | Won | |
| 2023 | 28th Asian Television Awards | Best Editing | Krich Towiwat | Won | |
| 2023 | 28th Asian Television Awards | Best Actor in a Leading Role | Metawin Opas-iamkajorn | Nominated | |
| 2023 | 28th Asian Television Awards | Best Actress in a Leading Role | Chanikarn Tangkabodee | Nominated | |
| 2024 | The 20th Baannang Klang Lakorn Awards | Best Mini Series or Anthology (Television and Streaming) | Enigma | Nominated | |
| 2024 | Nataraja Awards 2023 | Best Short-Formatted Lakorn | Enigma | Nominated | |
| 2024 | Nataraja Awards 2023 | Best Director | Patha Tongpan | Nominated | |
| 2024 | Nataraja Awards 2023 | Best Leading Actress | Chanikarn Tangkabodee | Nominated | |
| 2024 | Nataraja Awards 2023 | Best Leading Actor | Metawin Opas-iamkajorn | Nominated | |
| 2024 | Nataraja Awards 2023 | Best Screenplay | Patha Tongpan | Nominated | |
| 2024 | Nataraja Awards 2023 | Best Editing | Krich Towiwat | Nominated | |
| 2024 | Nataraja Awards 2023 | Best Cinematography | Supawat Morakotamporn | Nominated | |
| 2024 | Nataraja Awards 2023 | Best Visual Effects | | Nominated | |
| 2024 | Seoul International Drama Awards 2024 | Outstanding Asian Star (Thailand) | Metawin Opas-iamkajorn | Won | |
| 2024 | Seoul International Drama Awards 2024 | Outstanding Asian Star (Thailand) | Chanikarn Tangkabodee | Nominated | |
| 2024 | Maya Awards 2024 | Series Of The Year | Enigma | Nominated | |
| 2024 | Maya Awards 2024 | Actor of the Year | Metawin Opas-iamkajorn | Won | |
| 2024 | 2024 Content Asia Awards | Best Asian Drama Series made for a Regional or International Market | Enigma (Bronze Prize) | Won | |
| 2024 | 2024 Content Asia Awards | Best Sound Design for an Asian TV programme/series | Enigma (Silver Prize) | Won | |
| 2024 | 2024 Content Asia Awards | Best Director of a Scripted TV programme | Patha Tongpan | Nominated | |
| 2024 | Asia Contents Awards & Global OTT Awards | Best Creative | Enigma | Nominated | |
| 2024 | Asia Contents Awards & Global OTT Awards | Best Director | Patha Tongpan | Nominated | |
| 2024 | Asia Contents Awards & Global OTT Awards | Best Newcomer Actor (Male) | Metawin Opas-iamkajorn | Nominated | |
| 2024 | Asia Contents Awards & Global OTT Awards | People's Choice Award (Male) | Metawin Opas-iamkajorn | Nominated | |
