= A Love So Beautiful =

Chinese web television series

- Promotional poster

Chinese name
- Simplified Chinese: 致我们单纯的小美好
Transcriptions
Standard Mandarin
- Hanyu Pinyin: Zhì Wǒ Mén Dān Chún De Xiǎo Měi Hǎo
- Genre: Romantic comedy Coming-of-age story
- Based on: To Our Pure Little Beauty by Zhao Qianqian
- Directed by: Yang Long
- Starring: Hu Yitian; Shen Yue
- Country of origin: China
- Original language: Mandarin
- No. of seasons: 1
- No. of episodes: 23 (+1 special)

Production
- Running time: 45–55 minutes

Original release
- Network: Tencent Video
- Release: 9 November – 7 December 2017

Related
- A Love So Beautiful (Thai TV series) (2024: Thailand); A Love So Beautiful (South Korean TV series) (2020: South Korean)

A Love So Beautiful (Chinese: 致我们单纯的小美好; pinyin: Zhì Wǒ Mén Dān Chún De Xiǎo Měi Hǎo) is a Chinese television series starring Hu Yitian and Shen Yue, based on the novel To Our Pure Little Beauty by Zhao Qianqian. It aired on Tencent Video from 9 November to 7 December 2017.

The series received praise for its characterization and storyline. It surpassed more than 10.5 billion views on streaming services.

== Plot ==
The series focuses on two classmates at Chenxi Secondary School who have been friends since kindergarten: Chen Xiaoxi, a cheerful girl who excels at art but struggles academically, and Jiang Chen, an introverted boy who is popular for his looks and intelligence. Xiaoxi has a crush on Jiang Chen, who has been distant since his father's death. Together with their friends, Xiaoxi and Jiang Chen prepare for the gaokao, a university entrance examination. The series follows their journey together towards adulthood.

== Cast ==
=== Main ===
- Hu Yitian as Jiang Chen (江辰), a boy known for his looks and intelligence
- Shen Yue as Chen Xiaoxi (陈小希), an optimistic girl who excels at art but struggles academically

=== Supporting ===
- Gao Zhiting as Wu Bosong (吴柏松), a playful student who likes Xiaoxi
- Wang Ziwei as Lin Jingxiao (林静晓), as Xiaoxi's best friend
- Sun Ning as Lu Yang (陆杨), an energetic student with heart disease
- Lü Yan as Li Wei (李薇), the class president who bullies Xiaoxi
- Zhang He Hao Zhen as Li Shu (李束), the school's physician
- Wang Jiahui as Qiao Lu (乔露), Wei's best friend

== Soundtrack ==
No.	Title	Lyrics	Music	Singer	Length
1.	"How Much I Like You, You Would Know" (我多喜欢你, 你会知道)	Yin Kaiyi	Yin Kaiyi	Wang Junqi	3:13
2.	"It's a Dream" (是梦吧)	Yin Kaiyi	Yin Kaiyi	Hu Yitian	3:55
3.	"Little Beauty" (小美好)	Yin Kaiyi	Jie Nan	Feng Jiaqi	4:27

== Awards and nominations ==
Year	Award	Category	Nominated work	Result	Ref.
2017	8th Macau International Television Festival	Best Web Series	A Love So Beautiful	Nominated	
2017	3rd China Pan-Entertainment Annual Ceremony	Top 10 Web Series	A Love So Beautiful	Won	
2018	5th Hengdian Film and TV Festival of China	Best Web Series	A Love So Beautiful	Won	
2018	24th Huading Awards	Best Newcomer	Hu Yitian	Nominated	

== Remakes ==
In July 2020, Kakao M announced production of a Korean remake starring So Joo-yeon, Kim Yo-han, Yeo Hoe-hyun, and Jo Hye-joo. Produced by WhyNot Media, a series premiered on KakaoTV on 28 December 2020. It was also released on Netflix.

In November 2022, GMMTV released a trailer for a Thai remake starring "Prim" Chanikarn Tangkabodee, "Dew" Jirawat Sutivanichsak, "Neo" Trai Nimtawat, "Pentor" Jeerapat Pimanprom, and "Emma" Panisara Yang. The series was co-produced by GMMTV and Insight Entertainment.
