= Jirawat Sutivanichsak =

Thai actor, model and singer (born 2000)

- ดิว จิรวรรตน์ สุทธิวณิชศักดิ์
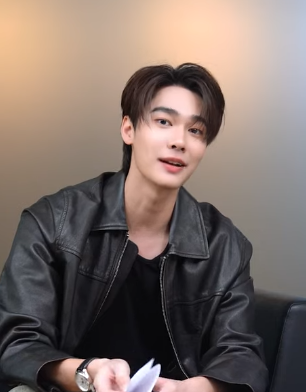
- Jirawat in January 2026
- Born: Kongkidakorn Sutivanichsak; 30 October 2000 (age 26); Bangkok, Thailand
- Other name: Dew
- Education: Saint Gabriel's College; Srinakharinwirot University
- Occupation: Actor
- Years active: 2021–present
- Agent: GMMTV
- Notable work: Ren in F4 Thailand: Boys Over Flowers; Nai in Home School; Chadjen in A Love So Beautiful; Night in Leap Day; Kaye in Mr. Kill
- Height: 193 cm (6 ft 4 in)

Jirawat Sutivanichsak (Thai: จิรวรรตน์ สุทธิวณิชศักดิ์; born 30 October 2000), nicknamed Dew (Thai: ดิว), is a Thai actor. He rose to prominence with his acting debut in F4 Thailand: Boys Over Flowers (2021), which garnered him widespread recognition both domestically and internationally.

== Early life ==
Jirawat was born in Bangkok, Thailand. His birth name is Kongkidakorn, but he changed it to Jirawat when he was in elementary school. He is an artist under GMMTV. He studied at Saint Gabriel's College in high school and is now studying Interactive Design and Multimedia at Srinakharinwirot University. Prior to acting, he entered the entertainment industry as a model.

== Career and breakthrough ==
In 2021, Dew made his acting debut as "Ren Renrawin Aira" (Rui Hanazawa) in the series F4 Thailand: Boys Over Flowers, a Thai adaptation of the Japanese manga Hana Yori Dango by Yoko Kamio. On 16 September 2020, GMMTV officially revealed the cast. The series was an international success and was ranked 1st in "Top Thai Romance Series" to watch online. His role in the series received warm reception and gave him worldwide popularity.

In 2022, Dew had successful stint during musical concerts "Shooting Star", across South-East Asian countries, along with his F4 Thailand casts. In September 2022, he played as "Fong" in romance anthology 'Zero in the Moonlight', a short series Magic of Zero alongside Tontawan Tantivejakul (Tu) who played as his love interest.

In 2023, Dew starred as "Nai" in the suspense-horror Thai television series Home School, along with Ramida Jiranorraphat (Jane) and his fellow F4 Thailand artist Hirunkit Changkham (Nani) . The series becomes first original Thai series on Prime Video, Thailand. In July, he appeared in (G)I-dle's music video "I Do: A Love Story in Bangkok." In 2024, he starred in a romantic comedy series A Love So Beautiful alongside Chanikarn Tangkabodee (Prim), a remake of the popular Chinese series A Love So Beautiful.

== Endorsements ==
Dew features regularly in Mint, Harper's Bazaar, L'Officiel Hommes, LIPS, and Elle. He modelled luxury brands like Louis Vuitton, Fendi, Prada, Ralph Lauren, Bottega Veneta, and Valentino. In May 2023, he was a guest celebrity on the Louis Vuitton's Pre-Fall 2023 show in Seoul, South Korea. By July 2023, he had over 7.5M followers on Instagram and his lifestyle includes sketching and photography. From August onwards, he had solo tour in few South-Asian countries. In September 2023, he was guest for the Emporio Armani's fashion week and Onitsuka Tiger SS 2024 in Milan, Italy.

== Filmography ==
=== Television series ===
Key
†	Denotes television productions that have not yet been released

Year	Title	Role	Notes	Network	Ref
2021	F4 Thailand: Boys Over Flowers	"Ren" Renrawin Aira	Main role	GMM25	
2022	Magic of Zero: Zero In The Moonlight	Fong	Main role	GMM25	
2022	Good Old Days	Nut	Guest role (Ep. 10)	GMM25	
2023	Home School	Nai	Main role	GMM25	
2023	Faceless Love	"Vee" Veekij Kraiphiwat	Main role	GMM25	
2024	A Love So Beautiful	"Chadjen" Phaisansakul	Main role	GMM25	
2025	Leap Day	"Night" Rattikan	Main role	GMM25	
2025	Burnout Syndrome	Pheem	Main role	GMM25	
2026	MuTeLuv: Love Lock	Payu	Main role	GMM25	
2026	Mr. Kill	"Kaye" Chankacha Thanyapat / "Mr. Kill"	Main role	GMM25	
TBA	Blue Print †	Jiran	Main role	TBA	
TBA	High & Low: Born to Be High †	Jin	TBA	TBA	

== Discography ==
=== OST ===
Year	Song title	Artist	Ref.
2022	"Who Am I"	Vachirawit Chivaaree (Bright), Jirawat Sutivanichsak, Metawin Opas-iamkajorn (Win) & Hirunkit Changkham (Nani)	
2022	"Shooting Star"	Vachirawit Chivaaree (Bright), Jirawat Sutivanichsak (Dew), Metawin Opas-iamkajorn (Win) & Hirunkit Changkham (Nani)	
2022	"In The Wind"	Dew	
2023	"North Star"	Dew	
2026	"โลกขาวดำ (True Color)"	Jirawat Sutivanichsak and Teeradech Vitheepanich (Tee)	
2026	"ถ้าสบตา (Mr. K)"	Dew	

=== Music video appearances ===
Year	Title	Artist	Channel	Ref.
2023	"I Do"	(G)I-dle	88rising	

== Awards and nominations ==
Year	Award	Category	Work	Result	Ref.
2022	The 3rd Mani Mekhala Awards (2022)	Outstanding Male Rising Star	—N/a	Won	
2022	Content Asia Awards	Best Original Song: For Movie or An Asian TV Program	"Who Am I" Ost. F4 Thailand	Nominated	
2022	The 27th Asian Television Awards (ATA)	Best Theme Song	"Who Am I" Ost. F4 Thailand	Nominated	
2022	Asian Academy Creative Awards (AAA) 2022	Best Theme Song or Title Theme: National Winners	"Who Am I" Ost. F4 Thailand	Won	
2022	Asian Academy Creative Awards (AAA) 2022	Best Theme Song or Title Theme: Grand Final Winners	"Who Am I" Ost. F4 Thailand	Won	
2023	14th Nataraja Awards	Best Cast Ensemble	F4 Thailand	Nominated	
2023	Central World Music Community Award 2023	Artist Of The Year	"North Star"	Nominated	
2026	Maya Awards 2026	Outstanding Couple of the year with Tee Teeradech	Mr. Kill	Won	
2026	14th Howe Awards	Rising Icon	—N/a	Won	
