= Wu (TV series) =

2026 Thai television series

- Official series poster
- Thai: อู
- Genre: Action; Fantasy
- Created by: Waasuthep Ketpetch; Puchong Tuntisungwaragul
- Screenplay by: Waasuthep Ketpetch; Ranet Santep; Methus Sirinawin
- Directed by: Waasuthep Ketpetch
- Starring: Wongravee Nateetorn; Hirunkit Changkham
- Opening theme: "ฟ้าสั่ง (Destiny)" (Instrumental)
- Ending theme: "ฟ้าสั่ง (Destiny)" by FLIO (Ep. 1–4, 8–9); "สิ่งสำคัญ (We Are One)" by Sky Wongravee and Nani Hirunkit (Ep. 5–7)
- Composer: Tanatat Chaiyaat
- Country of origin: Thailand
- Original languages: Thai; Mandarin; Hakka
- No. of episodes: 9

Production
- Executive producers: Sataporn Panichraksapong; Darapa Choeysanguan; Kamthorn Lorjitramnuay; Patha Thongpan
- Producers: Waasuthep Ketpetch; Nuttapong Mongkolsawas; Supaporn Lertthitiverakarn
- Cinematography: Wongwattana Chunhavuttiyanon
- Editors: Monthon Viriyabantorn; Therawit Srisiri; Mitpracha Outtaros
- Running time: 50-55 minutes
- Production companies: GMMTV; Parbdee Taweesuk

Original release
- Network: GMM 25; iQIYI; Viu
- Release: 5 May – 30 June 2026

Wu (Thai: อู; stylized as WU) is a Thai action fantasy television series, starring Wongravee Nateetorn (Sky) and Hirunkit Changkham (Nani). Directed by Waasuthep Ketpetch and produced by GMMTV together with Parbdee Taweesuk, it was announced at GMMTV's Riding the Wave event on 26 November 2024.

The series premiered on GMM 25 on 5 May 2026, airing every Tuesday at 20:30 ICT, and was made available for streaming on Viu at 21:30 ICT.

== Synopsis ==
Pete (Hirunkit Changkham), an unlucky young man carrying a fragment of a demon's soul who has the ability to sense "Yao", strange energies that devour the life force of people. When he crosses paths with Niran (Wongravee Nateetorn), a man gifted with the rare ability to alter fate itself, he is lead into the world of "Wu". The two become unlikely partners, forced to rely on each other through every obstacle, until their souls are bound together.

== Cast and characters ==
=== Main ===
- Wongravee Nateetorn (Sky) as Wu Yong Le (Niran)
- Hirunkit Changkham (Nani) as Jiraphat Phruetchaianan (Pete)

=== Supporting ===
- Perawat Sangpotirat (Krist) as Li Puo Saeming
- Tachakorn Boonlupyanun (Godji) as Fei
- Sapol Assawamunkong (Great) as Tong
- Dr. Palang Rocksilp as Jia Hao
- Wanchana Sawasdee (Bird) as Chaisak Krai-adirek
- Khoo Pei-Cong (Wave) as Bao Cheng
- Singha Luangsuntorn as Yok
- Kanthee Limpitikranon (Ken) as Jack
- Tiranat Kittisattho (Juno) as Thua
- Chayuth Gorsurat (Titan) as Tao
- Chompoopuntip Temtanamongkol (Acare) as Ploy Phruetchaianan

=== Guest role ===
- Tawinan Anukoolprasert (Sea) as Thawit Anantarakan (Top) (Ep.1)
- Suphach Tawsagun (Boky) as young Wu Yong Le (Ep. 2–3, 7, 9)
- Paphon Jirahitaphat as Gung (Ep. 2–3, 7–9)
- Phuwin Tangsakyuen as Sira (Ep. 3, 6)

== Episodes ==
No.	Title	Original release date
1	"Episode One"	5 May 2026
Pete gambles his wage away when a "Yao" attempts to take his soul — leaving Niran to step in. Niran must free a dying man from the darkness when his body is left unable to die. Faced with danger and a realisation about himself, Pete must put his trust in Niran and fight off the "Yao" as it retaliates against the ones trying to destroy it.
2	"Episode Two"	12 May 2026
Niran and Pete go back to the gambling house to defeat the "Yao" that has been inhabiting there for decades. Falling deeper into a world he is more entangled in that he thought, Pete willingly uses himself as bait. As political unrest grips the country, Pete decides to team up with Niran and free the innocent from whatever "Yao" the duo come across.
3	"Episode Three"	19 May 2026
Pete refuses to leave Niran alone until his questions are answered. Fei enlists Niran's help to take on the Demon that is putting the country into political unrest, to which Niran recruits Pete for their next mission. Niran intends to take on the Demon by tapping into the force Pete is a vessel for.
4	"Episode Four"	26 May 2026
As Niran moves in with Pete, intending to train him to control the force inside of him, Pete's anger is a detriment to their progress. Niran refuses to give up on Pete. Li Puo decides to escalate and turns his attention to Ploy, giving Pete the motivation he needs to overcome himself.
5	"Episode Five"	2 June 2026
When Pete becomes overtaken and corrupted by his own power, Niran decides the only way to save him to irreversibly bind their souls together. As "Team Wu" decide now is the time to bind Qi Rong away, they are faced with the realisation that Pete — and by extension Niran — are at the most risk. Fei wonders if their efforts are defying Heaven's will.
6	"Episode Six"	9 June 2026
Trapped in Qi Rong's hallucinogenic mist, each member of "Team Wu" must face an impossible decision, their greatest fear or the worst parts of themself. When Niran is lost, Pete must call upon their Soul Bond to call him back. Li Puo reveals a devastating truth that someone on "Team Wu" is hiding.
7	"Episode Seven"	16 June 2026
As the other half of Niran's soul, Pete is the only one who can travel to the Spirit Realm and return Niran to his body. Stuck watching Niran through different stages of adversity throughout his life, Pete must gain Niran's trust and convince him to return to the real world, even if Niran wants the exact opposite.
8	"Episode Eight"	23 June 2026
Li Puo escalates once again and decides he is done taking orders. "Team Wu" find a way to restore the stolen spirits of the people whilst still sealing away Qi Rong. The Government decide to use real weapons against the protesters. "Team Wu" attempt to seal Qi Rong away again when Li Puo plays his trump card.
9	"Episode Nine"	30 June 2026
"Team Wu" finally seal away Qi Rong when the Prime Minister announces the usage of weapons on civilians. Niran wants to perform a ritual to appeal for Heaven's intervention when he is kidnapped by the Government. Pete finally gains total control of his inner power.

== Original soundtrack ==
The official soundtrack for Wu features:

Song	Artist(s)	Label	Ref.
"ฟ้าสั่ง (Destiny)"	FLIO	GMMTV Records	
"สิ่งสำคัญ (We Are One)"	Sky Wongravee and Nani Hirunkit	GMMTV Records	

== Production ==
The series was announced at the GMMTV 2025: Riding the Wave event on 26 November 2024. Production for the series officially began on 13 November 2025 and concluded on 18 April 2026. The official trailer was released on 20 April 2026.

== Fan meetings ==
Year	Title	Date	Venue	Ref.
2026	Wu: The Fate Begins	5 May 2026	CentralWorld Pulse Hall (7th floor)	
2026	Wu Destiny Fan Party	30 June 2026	MCC Hall (3rd floor), The Mall Lifestore Bangkapi	
2026	Wu Destiny After Party	1 July 2026	MCC Hall (3rd floor), The Mall Lifestore Bangkapi	

== Awards and nominations ==
Award nominations for Wu
Year	Award	Category	Nominee(s)	Result	Ref.
2026	Asian Academy Creative Awards 2026	Best Actor in a Supporting Role (Thailand)	Perawat Sangpotirat	Won	
2026	Asian Academy Creative Awards 2026	Best Direction (Fiction)	Waa Waasuthep	Won	
2026	Asian Academy Creative Awards 2026	Best Editing	Wu	Won	
2026	31st Asian Television Awards	Best Original Screenplay	Waasuthep Ketpetch, Ranet Santep and Methus Sirinawin	Nominated	
2026	31st Asian Television Awards	Best Scriptwriting	Waasuthep Ketpetch, Ranet Santep and Methus Sirinawin	Nominated	
2026	31st Asian Television Awards	Best Southeast Asian Drama (Direction)	Waasuthep Ketpetch	Nominated	
2026	31st Asian Television Awards	Best Southeast Asian Drama (Screenplay)	Waasuthep Ketpetch, Ranet Santep and Methus Sirinawin	Nominated	
2026	31st Asian Television Awards	Best Theme Song	"ฟ้าสั่ง (Destiny)"	Nominated	
