= Yang Yoo-jin =

South Korean model, singer and actress (born 1995)

- 양유진
- Born: Yang Yoo-jin; March 19, 1995 (age 31); South Korea
- Other names: Yang Yu-jin; Yeon Yi-soo
- Education: Jeonju Fine Arts High School
- Occupations: Singer; actress; model
- Years active: 2017–present
- Agent: PITAPAT Entertainment
- Musical career
- Genre: K-pop
- Instrument: Vocals
- Years active: 2016
- Label: KC Entertainment
- Formerly of: Heart

Korean name
- Hangul: 양유진
- RR: Yang Yujin
- MR: Yang Yujin

Yang Yoo-jin (Korean: 양유진; born March 19, 1995, in South Korea), also known by her former stage name Yeon Yisoo (Korean: 연이수) is a South Korean singer, actress and model. She graduated from Jeonju Fine Arts High School.

== Career ==
Yang is a former TS, MBK, WMY and Source Music trainee. She was in GFriend pre-debut lineup but did not make her debut. Yang made her debut with Heart on December 26, 2016, with their debut single, "Jooruruk" under KC Entertainment. However, the group disbanded in 2017.

Yang made her debut as a model and is managed under MY COMPANY. She made her acting debut in the web series Sleepless in Love in 2018. She was cast in the series Best Mistake 2 as Yoon Ah-ra in 2020. Yang played a supporting role in A Love So Beautiful as Seo Ji-soo aired on December 28, 2020.

She's currently signed to PITAPAT Entertainment.

== Filmography ==
=== Television series ===
Year	Title	Role	Notes	Ref.
2018	Sleepless in Love	Ji Yi	Lead role	
2020	Best Mistake 2	Yoon Ah-ra	Supporting role	
2020	A Love So Beautiful	Seo Ji-soo	Supporting role	

=== Music video appearances ===
Year	Song title	Artist	Ref.
2017	"Fall In Love"	Hong Dae-kwang	
2017	"Real Love"	Henry Lau	
2019	"Island"	The Black Skirts	
2019	"So Long"	Daybreak	
