= Mr. Kill =

2026 Thai television series

- Official series poster
- Thai: มังงะสั่งตาย
- Genre: Mystery; Thriller
- Screenplay by: Titipong Chaisati; Chankacha Pratuan
- Directed by: Sakon Tiacharoen
- Starring: Jirawat Sutivanichsak; Teeradech Vitheepanich
- Ending theme: "โลกขาวดำ (True Color)" by Dew Jirawat and Tee Teeradech (Ep. 1–5) "ถ้าสบตา (Mr. K)" by Dew Jirawat (Ep. 6–8) "เสียงของเงา (Our Name)" by Tee Teeradech (Ep. 9–10)
- Composer: Tanatat Chaiyaat
- Country of origin: Thailand
- Original language: Thai
- No. of episodes: 10

Production
- Executive producers: Sataporn Panichraksapong; Darapa Choeysanguan
- Producers: Ekkasit Trakulkasemsuk; Supaporn Lertthitiverakarn; Nuttapong Mongkolsawas
- Cinematography: Suthipong Teerasakul
- Editor: Baragrom Sawangthaitawat
- Running time: 50 minutes
- Production companies: GMMTV; Keng Kwang Kang Waisai

Original release
- Network: GMM 25; OneD
- Release: 7 July – 8 September 2026

Mr. Kill (Thai: มังงะสั่งตาย; RTGS: Mangnga Sang Tai, lit. 'Manga Orders to Die') is a Thai mystery thriller television series starring Jirawat Sutivanichsak (Dew) and Teeradech Vitheepanich (Tee).

Directed by Sakon Tiacharoen and produced by GMMTV and Keng Kwang Kang Waisai, the series was announced during the GMMTV 2026: Magic Vibes Maximized event on 25 November 2025.

The series premiered on GMM 25 on 7 July 2026, airing on Tuesdays at 20:30 ICT, and was made available for streaming on OneD app at 21:30 ICT.

== Synopsis ==
A mysterious murder case that imitates the underground manga "Nekros", leads to Kaye (Jirawat Sutivanichsak), a famous manga writer who hides wounds in his past, to be entangled with the investigation of Phat (Teeradech Vitheepanich), a young police officer who adheres to the law. Although both have different views on justice, the deeper they investigate, the more they realise that their lives are linked to the same tragedy. When the truth behind the case is revealed, both Kaye and Phat must face a painful past, including an important decision between revenge and justice.

== Cast and characters ==
=== Main ===
- Jirawat Sutivanichsak (Dew) as Chankacha Thanyapat (Kaye) / "Mr. Kill"
- Teeradech Vitheepanich (Tee) as Yotsaphat Traikanawut (Phat)

=== Supporting ===
- Trai Nimtawat (Neo) as Nopphan Kongkram (Nop)
- Singha Luangsuntorn as Praewphat Traikanawut (Praew)
- Pattariyakorn Luangkungwankij (Mata) as Pimma Limkunchorn (Prim)
- Jumpol Adulkittiporn (Off) as Thawikorn Putthanan (Thun)
- Apwit Reardon (Lang) as Kim
- Siripanya Jantila (Pun) as Kitti
- Nasiwat Nopbhiromchai (Joker)
- Isariya Chanupala (Jengpang)
- Kittipong Pipatpatama (Kit)
- Sansiri Tonsiritrakul (Jiew)

=== Guest ===
- Taas Tanyongmas (Ep. 12)

== Original soundtrack ==
The official soundtrack for Mr. Kill features:

Song	Artist(s)	Label	Ref.
"โลกขาวดำ (True Color)"	Dew Jirawat and Tee Teeradech	GMMTV Records	
"ถ้าสบตา (Mr. K)"	Dew Jirawat	GMMTV Records	
"เสียงของเงา (Our Name)"	Tee Teeradech	GMMTV Records	

== Production ==
Production for the series officially began on 31 March 2026. The official novel for the series was released on 4 April 2026 with a fan signing hosted by the lead actors and director. In an interview segment for the web show GMMTV: Live House, lead actor Jirawat Sutivanichsak revealed that all the key art and manga panels drawn for both the pilot trailer and the series were his own work, as well as the illustrations for the official novel. The official trailer was released on 23 June 2026 ahead of the 7 July 2026 series premiere. Production for the series officially wrapped on 11 August 2026.

== Fan meetings ==
Year	Title	Date	Venue	Ref.
2026	Mr. Kill: The First Page	July 7, 2026	MCC Hall, Floor 3, The Mall Lifestore Bangkapi	
2026	Mr. Kill Final EP. Fan Meeting	September 8, 2026	CentralWorld Pulse Hall, CentralWorld	

== Awards and nominations ==
Year	Award	Category	Nominee(s)	Result	Ref.
2026	Maya Awards 2026	Outstanding Couple of the year	Dew Jirawat and Teeradech Vitheepanich	Won	
