= Jeong Jin-hwan =

South Korean rapper and actor

- 정진환
- Born: April 28, 1993 (age 33); South Korea
- Occupations: Singer; rapper; actor
- Musical career
- Genre: K-pop
- Instrument: Vocals
- Years active: 2018–present
- Label: Stardium

Korean name
- Hangul: 정진환
- RR: Jeong Jinhwan
- MR: Chŏng Chinhwan

Jeong Jin-hwan (Korean: 정진환, born April 28, 1993), is a South Korean singer, rapper and actor. He is a former member and leader of the boy group The Man BLK under Stardium Entertainment. He is best known for his role in A Love So Beautiful (2020).

== Filmography ==
=== Television series ===
Year	Title		Role	Notes	Ref.
Year	English	Korean	Role	Notes	Ref.
2018	Govengers	고벤져스	Jeong Jin-hwan	Lead role	
2018	Drunk in Good Taste	#좋맛탱	Park Jin-soo	Supporting role	
2019	Level Up	레벨업		Cameo	
2020	Ga Doo Ri's Sushi Restaurant	가두리횟집	Mo Tae-kyung	Supporting role	
2020	Soul Mechanic	영혼수선공	Sung Min-ho	Cameo	
2020	A Love So Beautiful	아름다웠던 우리에게	Jeong Jin-hwan	Lead role	
2026	Sword & Silence	문무	Yeon Nam-geon	Supporting role	
