= Hirunkit Changkham =

Thai actor, model and singer (born 1997)

- หิรัญกฤษฎิ์ ช่างคำ
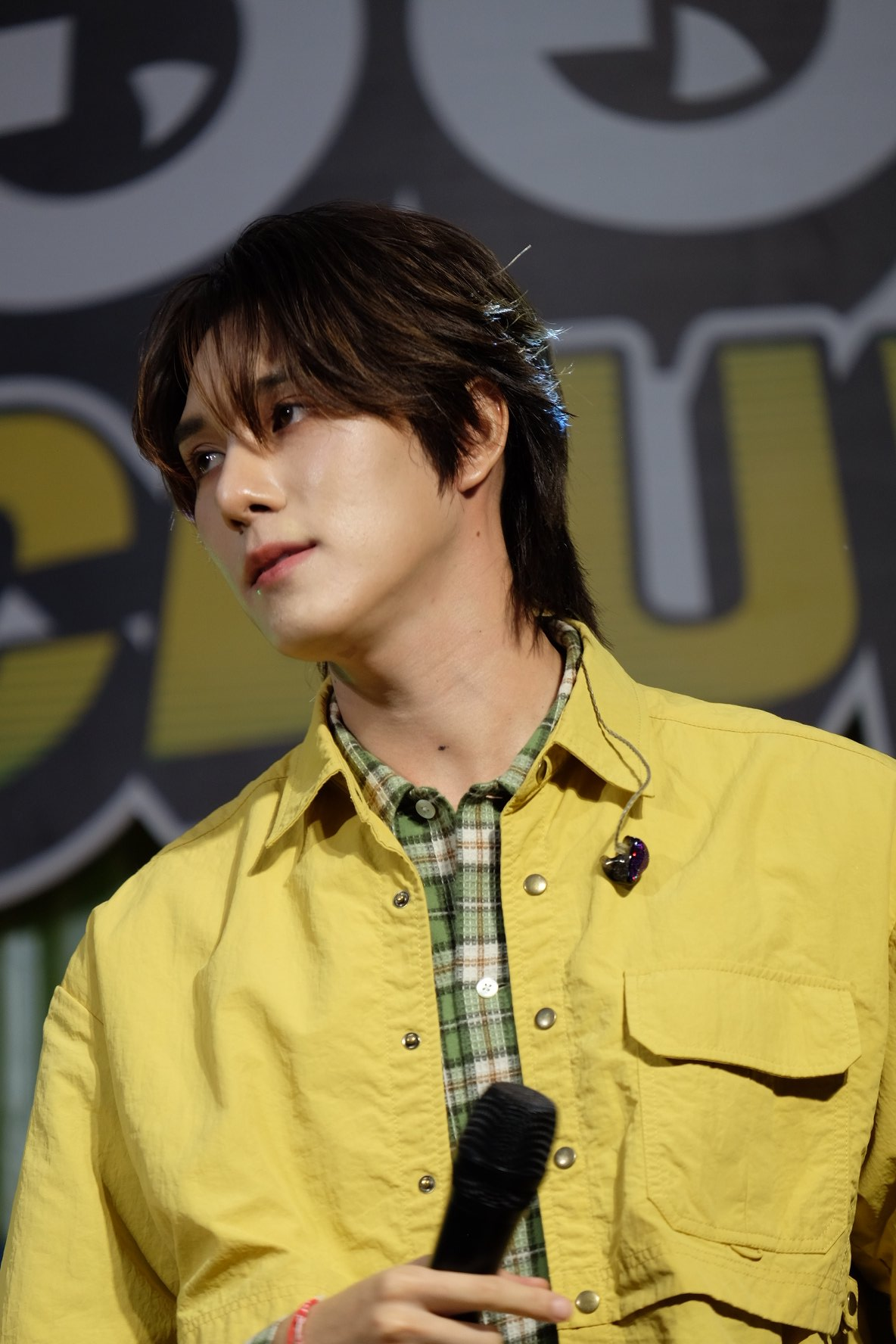
- Hirunkit at the Oishi event in November 2025
- Born: 30 October 1997 (age 29); Chiang Mai, Thailand
- Other name: Nani
- Education: Ramkhamhaeng University
- Occupations: Actor; Singer
- Years active: 2021–present
- Notable work: MJ in F4 Thailand: Boys Over Flowers; Shin in High School Frenemy
- Height: 180 cm (5 ft 11 in)
- Musical career
- Genres: Hip Hop; Thai Pop
- Years active: 2022–present
- Label: GMMTV
- Website: GMMTV Artist

Hirunkit Changkham (Thai: หิรัญกฤษฎิ์ ช่างคำ; born 30 October 1997), nicknamed Nani (Thai: นานิ), is a Thai actor and singer. He is best known for his roles in F4 Thailand: Boys Over Flowers (2021) and High School Frenemy (2024).

== Early life ==
Hirunkit was born in Chiang Mai, Thailand. He graduated from Chiang Mai Thepbodint School and Dara Academy and is currently studying political science at Ramkhamhaeng University.

== Career and breakthrough ==
In 2021, Hirunkit made his acting debut as "MJ Methas Jarustiwa" (Akira Mimasaka) in the series F4 Thailand: Boys Over Flowers, a Thai adaptation of the Japanese manga Hana Yori Dango by Yoko Kamio. On 16 September 2020, GMMTV made official announcement on the casts selection. The series was huge success in the international market, and was ranked 1st in "Top Thai Romance Series" to watch online His role in the series received positive response.

In 2022, Hirunkit had successful stint during musical concerts "Shooting Star" and "F4 Fanmeets", across South-East Asian countries, along with his F4 Thailand casts.

In 2023, Hirunkit starred in two new series Home School and Wednesday Club.

On 27 April 2024, he suffered injuries during the filming of High School Frenemy. He underwent hospital surgery for nasal fracture and cut on the eyebrow.

== Endorsements ==
On 21 March 2023, Hirunkit was a celebrity guest during Ferragamo's boutique, to celebrate the luxury brand's spring/summer 2023 collection in Kuala Lumpur, Malaysia. He features often in Mint, Harper's Bazaar, L'Officiel Hommes, Elle and is renowned face in the modelling industry. He has modeled for Prada, Gucci, Dior, Burberry, Versace, Vivienne Westwood Thailand, Louis Vuitton and many more. By May 2023, he had over 3.4M followers on Instagram. He has his own clothing brand names "Hannah". On 21 September 2023, Hirunkit was guest for the Emporio Armani's fashion week Women's Collection SS 2024 in Milan, Italy.

== Filmography ==
=== Film ===
| Year | Title | Role | Notes | Ref. |
|---|---|---|---|---|
| 2016 | The Rain Stories | John | Supporting role | |

=== Television series ===
Key
| † | Denotes television productions that have not yet been released |

| Year | Title | Role | Notes | Ref. |
|---|---|---|---|---|
| 2021 | F4 Thailand: Boys Over Flowers | "MJ" Methas Jarustiwa | Main role | |
| 2023 | Home School | Tibet | Main role | |
| 2023 | Wednesday Club | Palee | Main role | |
| 2024 | High School Frenemy | "Shin" Naruebet Ittiwat | Main role | |
| 2025 | MuTeLuv: Not My Father | Wutkrai Phantharak | Main role | |
| 2026 | Wu | "Pete" Jiraphat Phruetchaianan | Main role | |
| TBA | Arrest and Action † | "Han" Hannae Saetung | Main role | |
| TBA | High & Low: Born to Be High † | Tul | Main role | |
| TBA | The Jigsoul † | "Sundae" Arthit Khemmanudit | Main role | |

=== Music video appearances ===
| Year | Title | Artist | Ref. |
|---|---|---|---|
| 2022 | "Good Bye (กลับก่อนนะ)" | Ink Waruntorn | |
| 2025 | "See Through" | FELIZZ | |

=== Web series ===
| Year | Title | Role | Notes | Ref. |
|---|---|---|---|---|
| 2025 | The Racing Track เพราะเรา... สนามนี้ไม่มีแพ้ | CEO | Friends of Grab | |

== Discography ==
=== Singles ===
==== Collaborations ====
| Year | Title |
|---|---|
| 2025 | "แค่เรียกหา (Call My Name)" (with Sky Wongravee) |
| 2025 | "Can I Call You Tonight?" (with Sky Wongravee) |

==== Soundtrack appearances ====
| Year | Title | Album | Ref. |
|---|---|---|---|
| 2022 | "Who Am I" (with Bright, Win, Dew) | F4 Thailand: Boys Over Flowers OST | |
| 2022 | "Shooting Star" (with Bright, Win, Dew) | F4 Thailand: Boys Over Flowers OST | |
| 2022 | "Best Life" | F4 Thailand: Boys Over Flowers OST | |
| 2024 | "Promise" (with Sky Wongravee) | High School Frenemy OST | |
| 2026 | "สิ่งสำคัญ We Are One" (with Sky Wongravee) | Wu OST | |

== Awards and nominations ==
| Year | Award | Category | Nominated work | Result | Ref. |
|---|---|---|---|---|---|
| 2022 | Content Asia Awards | Best Original Song for an Asian TV Program or Movie | "Who Am I" | Nominated | |
| 2022 | 27th Asian Television Awards | Best Theme Song | "Who Am I" | Nominated | |
| 2022 | Asian Academy Creative Awards 2022 | Best Theme Song (Thailand) | "Who Am I" | Won | |
| 2023 | 14th Nataraja Awards | Best Cast Ensemble | F4 Thailand | Nominated | |
| 2025 | KAZZ Awards 2025 | Rising Male of The Year | High School Frenemy | Won | |
| 2025 | Mint Award 2025 | Best Digital Cover of the Year | - | Nominated | |
| 2025 | Howe Awards 2025 | Shining Male Award | High School Frenemy | Won | |
| 2026 | Sanook Top of the Year 2025 | Rising Star | High School Frenemy | Won | |
