= Chanikarn Tangkabodee =

Thai actress (born 2004)

- ชนิกานต์ ตังกบดี
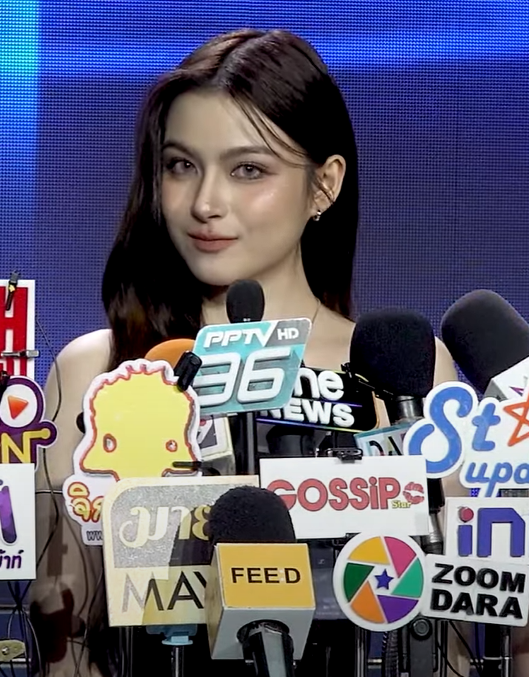
- Chanikarn in April 2024
- Born: 20 February 2004 (age 22); Bangkok, Thailand
- Other name: Prim Chanikarn
- Education: Chulalongkorn University
- Occupations: Actress; Model
- Years active: 2010–present
- Agent: GMMTV
- Height: 159 cm (5 ft 3 in)

Chanikarn Tangkabodee (Thai: ชนิกานต์ ตังคบดี, RTGS: Chanikan Tangkhabodi; born 20 February 2004), nicknamed Prim (Thai: พรีม), is a Thai actress and model. After signing with GMMTV in 2019, she appeared in Blacklist (2019) and later gained prominence for her roles in The Gifted: Graduation (2020), F4 Thailand: Boys Over Flowers (2021), and the anthology series Good Old Days (2022). She has since starred as the female lead in the horror-thriller Enigma (2023) and the romantic comedy A Love So Beautiful (2024).

== Early life and education ==
Chanikarn was born on 20 February 2004 in Bangkok, Thailand and is of Thai Chinese descent.

She completed her secondary education at Chulalongkorn University Demonstration School in 2022. She later pursued post-secondary education at Chulalongkorn University, graduating from the Faculty of Commerce and Accountancy, Chulalongkorn Business School in 2026.

== Career ==
Chanikarn began working in the entertainment industry as a child actress. At age ten, she made her film debut in Chiang Khan Story (2014), portraying the younger version of the female protagonist. Between 2014 and 2019, she appeared in guest roles across several television projects, including Luerd Ruk Toranong (2016), U-Prince: The Handsome Cowboy (2016) and Love Destiny (2018).

In 2019, Chanikarn signed a contract with GMMTV, making her debut under the label with a supporting role in Blacklist. She landed her first main role the following year in The Gifted: Graduation (2020). In 2021, she secured a prominent supporting role as Kaning in F4 Thailand: Boys Over Flowers, a performance that brought her international recognition.

In 2022, she starred alongside Perawat Sangpotirat in "Somewhere Only We Belong", the sixth segment of the anthology series Good Old Days.

In 2023, Chanikarn starred as the female lead in the horror-thriller series Enigma (2023). The following year, she starred in the romantic comedy series A Love So Beautiful, a Thai remake of the popular Chinese television series of the same name.

In 2025, she starred as Aom in The Dark Dice and Malai in the "Fist Foot Fusion" segment of the supernatural romantic comedy anthology series MuTeLuv (2025). The following year, she was cast in a supporting role as Bua-sai in Scarlet Heart Ullavee (2026).

== Endorsements ==
As a model, Chanikarn has collaborated with luxury fashion houses including Dior, Louis Vuitton, Gucci, Versace, and Bulgari, and has become an endorser for brands like Shein and Doctorlogy. She is frequently featured in fashion publications such as L'Officiel, Elle, Harper's Bazaar, and Vogue.

== Filmography ==
=== Film ===
| Year | Title | Role | Notes | Ref. |
|---|---|---|---|---|
| 2014 | Timeline | June (young) | Guest role | |
| 2014 | Chiang Khan Story | Pang (young) | Supporting role | |
| 2017 | Pay It Forward: Flowers in a Pile of Rubbish | Namphueng | Supporting role | |

=== Television series ===
Key
| † | Denotes television productions that have not yet been released |

| Year | Title | Role | Network | Notes | Ref. |
|---|---|---|---|---|---|
| 2010 | Sao Chai Hi Tech | Khai Tun | Channel 7 | Guest role | |
| 2011 | Roy Marn | May (young) | Channel 3 | Supporting role | |
| 2014 | Luksao Phomot | Manao (young) | Channel 3 | Supporting role | |
| 2015 | Luead Mungkorn: Krating | Hong (young) | Channel 3 | Supporting role | |
| 2015 | Luead Mungkorn: Hong | Hong (young) | Channel 3 | Supporting role | |
| 2016 | Mue Prab Sai Daew | Prim's younger sister | Channel 3 | Supporting role | |
| 2016 | U-Prince: The Handsome Cowboy | Prikkang (young) | GMM 25 | Guest role | |
| 2016 | Luerd Ruk Toranong | Soison (young) | Channel 3 | Guest role | |
| 2016 | Raeng Chang | Auengfah (young) | Workpoint TV | Guest role | |
| 2016 | Maya Chimplee | "Ai" Chanakan Damrongwech (young) | Channel 3 | Guest role | |
| 2017 | Ngao Arthun | Ja | Channel 8 | Supporting role | |
| 2018 | Love Destiny | Duen | Channel 3 | Guest role | |
| 2019 | Bangkok Vampire | Joe | Mono 29 | Guest role | |
| 2019 | My Love From Another Star | Praoroong (young) | Channel 3 | Guest role | |
| 2019 | Blacklist | Melon | GMM 25 | Supporting role | |
| 2020 | Nang Sao 18 Mongkut | Praow | GMM 25 | Supporting role | |
| 2020 | The Gifted: Graduation | "Grace" Natnicha Wongwattana | GMM 25 | Main role | |
| 2021–2022 | F4 Thailand: Boys Over Flowers | "Kaning" Kanittha Na Bangpleang | GMM 25 | Supporting role | |
| 2022 | Good Old Days: Somewhere Only We Belong | Mai | Disney+ Hotstar | Main role | |
| 2023 | Enigma | "Fa" Farinda Panya-angkul | GMM 25 | Main role | |
| 2024 | A Love So Beautiful | "Som-O" Kewalin Asarattana | GMM 25 | Main role | |
| 2025 | The Dark Dice | Aom | GMM 25 | Main role | |
| 2025 | MuTeLuv: Fist Foot Fusion | Malai | GMM 25 | Main role | |
| 2026 | Scarlet Heart Ullavee | Bua-sai | One 31 | Supporting role | |
| TBA | Vamp Eternal Destiny † | TBA | TBA | Main role | |
| TBA | Safety Flirt † | Jira | TBA | Main role | |

=== Music video appearances ===
| Year | Title | Artist(s) | Ref. |
|---|---|---|---|
| 2021 | "Closer" (แค่ไหนก็ใกล้) | Metawin Opas-iamkajorn | |
| 2022 | "Sleepless" (นอนไม่พอ) | Perawat Sangpotirat | |
| 2022 | "ก๊อก ก๊อก" | Lipta feat. UrboyTJ | |
| 2023 | "North Star" | Jirawat Sutivanichsak | |
| 2024 | "ใกล้เกิน (Too Close to Handle)" | Gemini | |
| 2024 | "Strawberry Love" | Mirror | |
| 2026 | "อยู่ด้วยกันนะ (Every Single Day)" | Fourth | |
| 2026 | "รักมักยาก (Lover Loser)" | BUS | |

== Awards and nominations ==
| Year | Award | Category | Nominated work | Result | Ref. |
|---|---|---|---|---|---|
| 2021 | Kazz Awards 2021 | Rising Actress of the Year | | Nominated | |
| 2022 | 27th Asian Television Awards | Best Actress in a Supporting Role | F4 Thailand: Boys Over Flowers | Won | |
| 2023 | Maya TV Awards 2023 | Female Rising Star of the Year | F4 Thailand: Boys Over Flowers | Nominated | |
| 2023 | 28th Asian Television Awards | Best Actress in a Leading Role | Enigma | Nominated | |
| 2024 | Nataraja Awards 2023 | Best Leading Actress | Enigma | Nominated | |
