= High School Frenemy =

2024 Thai television series

- Official series poster
- Thai: มิตรภาพคราบศัตรู
- Genre: Drama; Bromance
- Created by: GMMTV
- Directed by: Kanittha Kwunyoo
- Starring: Wongravee Nateetorn; Hirunkit Changkham; Maria Poonlertlarp; Patara Eksangkul
- Country of origin: Thailand
- Original language: Thai
- No. of episodes: 16

Production
- Executive producer: Sataporn Panichraksapong
- Running time: 55 minutes
- Production companies: GMMTV; Nar-ra-tor

Original release
- Network: GMM 25; Viu
- Release: 14 October – 3 December 2024

Related
- School 2013

High School Frenemy (Thai: มิตรภาพคราบศัตรู; RTGS: Mittraphap Khrap Sattru) is a 2024 Thai television series starring Wongravee Nateetorn (Sky) and Hirunkit Changkham (Nani). It is an adaptation of the popular South Korean television series School 2013.

Directed by Kanittha Kwunyoo (Fon) and produced by GMMTV together with Nar-ra-tor, this series was announced as one of the television series of GMMTV for 2024 during their "GMMTV2024: UP&ABOVE Part 1" event held on 17 October 2023. It premiered on 14 October 2024, airing every Monday-Tuesday at 20:30 ICT on GMM 25 and 22:30 ICT on Viu.

== Synopsis ==
When Siamwit School falls on hard times, the school administrator Paphada (Sueangsuda Lawanprasert) decides to merge the Udon Pithak campus with the main campus, Thep Burapha. The two campuses have been in conflict for a long time, but this time they will be studying under one roof for the next school year.

Saint (Wongravee Nateetorn), the class president of M.5/2 (equivalent to Grade 11 in high school), doesn't care about school life and anyone in it. However, now he meets Shin (Hirunkit Changkham), a rebellious, temperamental, and stubborn person. In the past, Saint and Shin were close friends, but something happened between them, causing their friendship to end violently. The dispute between the two leads to a riot in the class, meaning their teachers, Jan (Maria Poonlertlarp) and Sung (Patara Eksangkul), must put aside their differences and come together to end the conflict that requires reconciliation between Saint and Shin.

== Cast and characters ==
=== Main ===
- Wongravee Nateetorn (Sky) as Thamnithit Nitiroj (Saint)
- Hirunkit Changkham (Nani) as Naruebet Ittiwat (Shin)
- Maria Poonlertlarp as Jan
- Patara Eksangkul (Foei) as Sung Sirawit

=== Supporting ===
- Kay Lertsittichai as Ken Kasidit
- Pakin Kunaanuwit (Mark) as Chadjen
- Pussarasorn Bosuwan (Bonnie) as Peeta Peechaya
- Jiruntanin Trairattanayon (Mark) as Cable (Paphada's son)
- Supha Sangaworawong (Est) as Tew
- Chayapol Jutamas (AJ) as Knot Natthaphat
- Chayakorn Jutamas (JJ) as Nate Natthakit
- Teepakron Kwanboon (Prom) as First
- Benyapa Jeenprasom (View) as Eve
- Wanwimol Jaenasavamethee (June) as Airy
- Preeyaphat Lawsuwansiri (Earn) as Tangmay
- Sueangsuda Lawanprasert (Namfon) as Paphada
- Nantawut Boonrubsub (Wut) as Jeng
- Pitisak Yaowananon (Tae) as Chai (Saint's father)
- Leo Saussay as Jo
- Chalad Na Songkhla (Nueng) as Pokpong
- Chanokwanun Rakcheep (Took) as Anya (Shin's mother)
- Himawari Tajiri as Chingching (Shin's sister)
- Waruschaya Ophassirirath (Nuanear) as Ging (Thep Burapha's student)

=== Guest ===
- Sarawut Siriphet as Creditor (Ep. 1)
- Thanawin Pholcharoenrat (Winny) as Jom (udon pithak's student) (Ep. 5)
- Praekwan Phongskul (Bimbeam) as Prang (Class 3 Udon Pithak's student) (Ep. 9–10)
- Natarit Worakornlertsith (Marc) as Pipe (Class 3 thep burapha's student) (Ep. 9–10)
- Jonathan Holman (Jack) as Ken's father (Ep. 13, 15)

== Soundtrack ==
Song title	English title	Artist	Ref.
ไม่ทิ้งกัน	Promise	Wongravee Nateetorn (Sky), Hirunkit Changkham (Nani)	
