= Wongravee Nateetorn =

Thai actor and model (born 1998)

- วงศ์รวี นทีธร
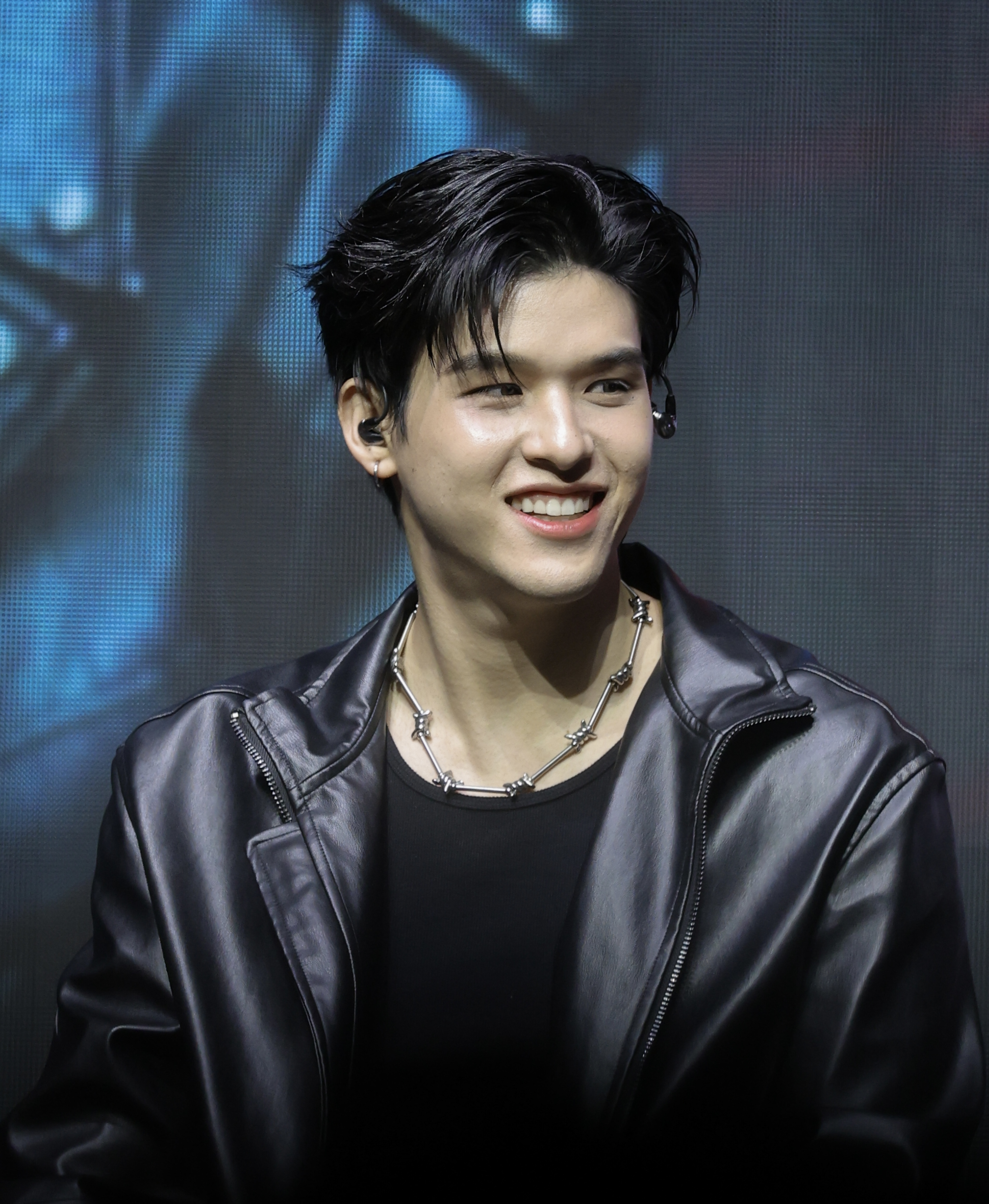
- Wongravee in March 2025
- Born: Wongravee Nateetorn; 25 June 1998 (age 28); Ranong, Thailand
- Other name: Sky
- Education: Suankularb Wittayalai School: Thammasat University
- Occupations: Actor; Model
- Years active: 2014–present
- Agent: Nadao Bangkok (2014–2022): GMMTV (2023–present)
- Height: 1.84 m (6 ft 1/2 in)

Wongravee Nateetorn (Thai: วงศ์รวี นทีธร; RTGS: Wongrawi Nathithon, born 25 June 1998), nicknamed Sky (Thai: สกาย), is a Thai actor and model. He first gained attention for his role as Pala in Hormones (2015). and rose to fame as Chalam in My Ambulance (2019). In 2024, he starred as Saint in the television series High School Frenemy.

== Early life and education ==
Wongravee was born in Ranong, Thailand. He graduated secondary school from Suankularb Wittayalai School. For his bachelor's degree, Sky studied at Thammasat University under the Faculty of Liberal Arts.

== Career ==
He entered the entertainment industry from the competition Hormones The Next Gen in 2013. After signing with Nadao Bangkok, he has been taking part in several dramas such as ThirTEEN Terrors (2014), Hormones: The Series (2015), Project S: Side by Side (2017), and My Ambulance (2019). He was with the company until 2022, then he signed with GMMTV in 2023.

== Filmography ==
=== Television series ===
Key
†	Denotes television productions that have not yet been released

Year	Title	Role	Notes	Ref.
2014	ThirTEEN Terrors	Gap	Main role (Ep. 4)	
2015	Hormones: The Series 3	"Pala" Sutthiphonruedi		
2016	I Hate You, I Love You	Jo		
2017	Project S: Side by Side	Dong		
2019	Project 17: Side By Side		Guest role	
2019	My Ambulance	Chalam	Main role	
2024	High School Frenemy	"Saint" Thamnithit Nitiroj	Main role	
2025	MuTeLuv: Fist Foot Fusion	"Klairung" Phayap Trisiriwimol	Main role	
2026	Wu	"Niran" Wu Yong Le	Main role	
2026	Scarlet Heart Ullavee	In Saeng	Guest role	
TBA	Arrest and Action †	"Pao" Sompao Yaowarit	Main role	
TBA	High & Low: Born to Be High †	Sun	Main role	
TBA	Itaewon Class: Thai Edition †	TBA	Main role	

=== Film ===
Year	Title	Role	Notes	Ref.
2022	OMG! Oh My Girl	Guy	Main role	
2022	The Lost Lotteries	Tay	Main role	
2025	Lilo and Stitch	David	Voice role, Thai version	

=== Music video appearances ===
Year	Title	Artist	Label	Ref.
2023	"I Think of You"	Bright Vachirawit	Riser Music	

=== Web series ===
Year	Title	Role	Notes
2025	The Racing Track เพราะเรา... สนามนี้ไม่มีแพ้	Chef	Friends of Grab

== Discography ==
=== Singles ===
==== As lead artist ====
Year	Title
2021	"คถ. (Missing You)"

==== Collaborations ====
Year	Title
2025	"แค่เรียกหา (Call My Name)" (with Nani Hirunkit)
2025	"Can I Call You Tonight?" (with Nani Hirunkit)

==== Soundtrack appearances ====
Year	Title	Album
2024	"ไม่ทิ้งกัน (Promise)" (with Nani Hirunkit)	High School Frenemy OST
2026	"สิ่งสำคัญ (We Are One)" (with Nani Hirunkit)	Wu OST

== Awards and nominations ==
Year	Award	Category	Nominated work	Result	Ref.
2017	9th Nataraja Awards	Best Supporting Actor	Project S the Series: Side by Side	Nominated	
2017	9th Nataraja Awards	Best Ensemble Cast	Project S the Series: Side by Side	Nominated	
2018	LINE TV AWARDS	Best Fight Scene	Project S The Series: Side by Side (with Thanapob Leeratanakachorn)	Won	
2020	2020 Maya Awards	Special Award - Male Star (Sao Nam)	My Ambulance	Nominated	
2020	11th Nataraja Awards	Best Team Ensemble	My Ambulance	Nominated	
2021	Thailand Master Youth 3 2020-2021	Youth Role Models, Actors	-	Won	
2023	31st Suphannahong Awards	Best Actor	OMG! Oh My Girl!	Nominated	
2025	Thailand Box Office Awards 2024	Series Category: Actor of the Year	High School Frenemy	Won	
2025	KAZZ Awards 2025	Popular Male Teenage Award	High School Frenemy	Won	
2025	Howe Awards 2025	Hottes Actor Award	High School Frenemy	Won	
