= Our Chocolate Moments =

2025 South Korean television series

- Promotional poster
- Hangul: 우리들의 초콜릿 순간
- RR: Urideurui chokollit sungan
- MR: Uridŭrŭi ch'ok'ollit sun'gan
- Genre: Human
- Written by: Jo Hee-sook
- Directed by: Jung Ji-young
- Starring: So Joo-yeon; Choi Won-young; Gong Seong-ha; Song Ji-ho
- Country of origin: South Korea
- Original language: Korean
- No. of episodes: 2

Production
- Production companies: SBS; Studio coming soon

Original release
- Network: SBS TV
- Release: February 11 – February 12, 2025

Our Chocolate Moments (Korean: 우리들의 초콜릿 순간) is a 2025 two-part South Korean television series written by Jo Hee-sook, directed by Jung Ji-young and starring So Joo-yeon, Choi Won-young, Gong Seong-ha, and Song Ji-ho. It was premiered on SBS TV on February 11 at 23:20 and ended on February 12 at 23:00 (KST).

== Synopsis ==
The drama is about three people, Joo Seul-gi, Kim Hyun-nam, and Jeon Soon-tae, who work at a chocolate company, making Valentine's Day chocolates together with Mr. Hong, the owner of a watch shop.

== Cast and characters ==
- So Joo-yeon as Joo Seul-gi
- Choi Won-young as Hong Sa-jang
- Gong Seong-ha as Kim Hyun-nam
- Song Ji-ho as Jeon Soon-tae

== Ratings ==
Average TV viewership ratings (nationwide)
Ep.	Original broadcast date	Average audience share (Nielsen Korea)
1	February 11, 2025	1.0% (46th)
2	February 12, 2025	0.8% (51st)
Average		0.9%
In the table above, the blue numbers represent the lowest ratings and the red numbers represent the highest ratings.
