= High & Low: Born to Be High =

2027 Thai upcoming television series

- Official pilot poster
- Directed by: Kamthorn Lorjitramnuay
- Starring: Korapat Kirdpan; Wongravee Nateetorn; Hirunkit Changkham; Way-Ar Sangngern
- Country of origin: Thailand
- Original language: Thai

Production
- Executive producer: Sataporn Panichraksapong
- Production companies: GMMTV; Parbdee Taweesuk

Related
- High&Low

High & Low: Born to Be High (stylized as HiGH&LOW: BoRN To bE HiGh) is an upcoming Thai television series to be produced by GMMTV and Parbdee Taweesuk. It is the first official overseas expansion of High&Low franchise.

Starring Korapat Kirdpan (Nanon), Wongravee Nateetorn (Sky), Hirunkit Changkham (Nani), Way-Ar Sangngern (Joss) and Tawinan Anukoolprasert (Sea), it was announced during the GMMTV 'Magic Vibes Maximized' event on 25 November 2025.

== Synopsis ==
The story inherits the worldview of "HiGH&LOW" so far, and through the action and drama of young people who stand up to protect their beliefs, a world full of dynamism shown in how the new chapter is depicted.

== Cast and characters ==
- Korapat Kirdpan (Nanon) as G-Foei
- Wongravee Nateetorn (Sky) as Sun
- Hirunkit Changkham (Nani) as Tul
- Way-Ar Sangngern (Joss)
- Tawinan Anukoolprasert (Sea) as Kit
- Naravit Lertratkosum (Pond) as Big Mac
- Thitiwat Ritprasert (Ohm) as Whin
- Pakin Kunaanuwit (Mark) as Pae
- Thanawat Rattanakitpaisan (Khaotung) as Zero
- Tanapon Sukumpantanasan (Perth) as Way
- Thanawin Pholcharoenrat (Winny) as Nemo
- Thanaboon Kiatniran (Aou) as Fifa
- Tinnasit Isarapongporn (Barcode) as Euro
- Panachai Sriariyarungruang (Junior) as Tiger
- Kasidet Plookphol (Book) as Puen
- Dechchart Tasilp (Sea) as Tone
- Jakrapatr Kaewpanpong (William) as Rang
- Jumpol Adulkittiporn (Off) as Peakboy
- Tawan Vihokratana (Tay) as Tui
- Warut Chawalitrujiwong (Prem) as Jod
- Rapheephong Thapsuwan (Bright) as H
- Jirawat Sutivanichsak (Dew) as Jin
- Nippitcha Pipitdaecha (Paeyah) as Itim
- Metawin Opas-iamkajorn (Win) as Gavin
