= Heat ((G)I-dle EP) =

2023 EP by (G)I-dle

Heat
- Digital cover

EP by (G)I-dle
- Released: October 5, 2023
- Length: 15:01
- Language: English
- Labels: 88rising; Cube
- Producers: Banx & Ranx; Jonathan Bellion; Lou Caluso; Rogét Chahayed; Chasu; Scott Dittrich; Evan Gartner; Lindgren; Imad Royal; Johny Simpson

(G)I-dle chronology
I Feel (2023)	Heat (2023)	2 (2024)

Singles from Heat
- 1. "I Do" Released: July 14, 2023; 2. "I Want That" Released: October 5, 2023

Professional ratings
Review scores
Source	Rating
NME	3/5 stars

Heat is the first English-language extended play (ninth overall) by South Korean girl group (G)I-dle. It was released on October 5, 2023, through 88rising and Cube Entertainment. Consisting of five tracks, the EP was supported by two singles "I Do" and "I Want That".

== Track listing ==
Heat track listing
No.	Title	Writer(s)	Producer(s)	Length
1.	"I Do"	Rogét Chahayed; Imad Royal; Blaise Railey; Drew Love	Chahayed; Royal	3:10
2.	"I Want That"	Michel "Lindgren" Schulz; Madison Love; Melanie Joy Fontana; Ryan Tedder	Lindgren	2:51
3.	"Eyes Roll"	J Lauryn; Meghan Trainor; Ryan Trainor; Yannick Rastogi; Youngbin Park; Zacharie Raymond	Banx & Ranx; Chasu	3:17
4.	"Flip It"	Alexis "Bae" Boyd; Blaise Railey; Evan Gartner; Gabriella Grombacher; Lauryn; Lucas Macaluso	Gartner; Lou Caluso	2:56
5.	"Tall Trees"	Jonathan Bellion; Johny Simpson; Scott Dittrich	Bellion; Simpson; Dittrich	2:45
Total length:				15:01

== Charts ==
=== Weekly charts ===
Weekly chart performance for Heat
Chart (2023)	Peak position
Belgian Albums (Ultratop Flanders)	191
Croatian International Albums (HDU)	36
Japanese Albums (Oricon)	46
Japanese Digital Albums (Oricon)	25
Japanese Hot Albums (Billboard Japan)	60
South Korean Albums (Circle)	2
US Billboard 200	25

=== Monthly charts ===
Monthly chart performance for Heat
Chart (2023)	Position
South Korean Albums (Circle)	12
