= The Dark Dice =

2025 Thai television series

- Official series poster
- Thai: เกมทอยทะลุมิติ
- Genre: Science fiction; Thriller; Drama
- Created by: Puchong Tuntisungwaragul
- Screenplay by: Krisada Kanivichaporn; Jarinee Thanomyat; Kavinjet Tantitanasap
- Directed by: Krisada Kanivichaporn
- Starring: Norawit Titicharoenrak; Chanikarn Tangkabodee; Nannaphas Loetnamchoetsakun; Ochiris Suwanacheep; Teepakron Kwanboon; Poon Mitpakdee; Teshow Promsakha Na Sakonnakhon; Nichapa Praepeerakul
- Country of origin: Thailand
- Original language: Thai
- No. of episodes: 8

Production
- Executive producers: Sataporn Panichraksapong; Darapa Choeysanguan
- Producers: Hlung Lorjitramnuay; Puchong Tuntisungwaragul; Patha Thongpan
- Cinematography: Wongwattana Chunhavuttiyanon
- Running time: 46 minutes
- Production companies: GMMTV; Parbdee Taweesuk

Original release
- Network: GMM25; Viu
- Release: 10 September – 29 October 2025

The Dark Dice (Thai: เกมทอยทะลุมิติ; Kem Thoi Thalu Miti, lit. Game [of] Rolling Pierce Through Dimension) is a 2025 Thai science fiction thriller drama television series, starring Norawit Titicharoenrak (Gemini), Chanikarn Tangkabodee (Prim), Nannaphas Loetnamchoetsakun (Mewnich), Ochiris Suwanacheep (Aungpao), Poon Mitpakdee, Teepakron Kwanboon (Prom), Teshow Promsakha Na Sakonnakhon and Nichapa Praepeerakul (Mymé).

Directed by Krisada Kanivichaporn (Keith) and produced by GMMTV and Parbdee Taweesuk, the series premiered on GMM25 and Viu on 10 September 2025, airing Wednesdays at 20:30 ICT and 22:30 ICT, respectively. The series concluded on 29 October 2025.

== Synopsis ==
Samut (Norawit Titicharoenrak) is an academic achiever who is expelled from his former school after getting into a fight. At his new school, Samut discovers a mysterious ancient dice, which transports him and seven other students into a game in another dimension.

In this enigmatic game of wits, the eight players must strategically solve puzzles to win a chance of having any wish granted. However, as the games increase in difficulty, they soon find their lives at stake. The players must choose to either compete, outsmart and betray each other or to work together in order to find a way out of the game.

== Cast and characters ==
=== Main ===
- Norawit Titicharoenrak (Gemini) as Samut Wongmethin
- Chanikarn Tangkabodee (Prim) as Aom
- Nannaphas Loetnamchoetsakun (Mewnich) as Napassorn Chonnapattarawong (Mamay)
- Ochiris Suwanacheep (Aungpao) as Natdanai Preedasirikul (Kaen)
- Teepakron Kwanboon (Prom) as Don
- Poon Mitpakdee as Benz
- Teshow Promsakha Na Sakonnakhon as Mark
- Nichapa Praepeerakul (Mymé) as Pie

=== Supporting ===
- Arisara Wongchalee (Fresh) as Mark's mother
- Supranee Charoenpol (Kai) as Aom's mother
- Pathitta Pornchumroenrut (Pahn) as Panyada Phlanudet
- Dusit Witooteerasan (Tae) as Mamay's father
- Napath Tangprapa (Peem)
- Natee Chawapong (Kai) as Samut's father
- Gancharas Ongwatana (Nook)
- Nareerat Wattanayothin (Duean)

=== Guest ===
- Wachirawit Ruangwiwat (Chimon) as Atom (Ep. 1–2, 4, 8)
- Panachkorn Rueksiriaree (Stamp) as Phubodin Thirawongwattana (Mai) (Ep. 4)
- Kanthee Limpitikranon (Ken) as Manus (Ep. 5, 7)

== Awards and nominations ==
Award nominations for The Dark Dice
Year	Award	Category	Nominee(s)	Result	Ref.
2026	31st Asian Television Awards	Best Southeast Asian Drama (Screenplay)	Krisada Kanivichaporn, Jarinee Thanomyat	Nominated	
