= I Want That (song) =

2023 single by (G)I-dle

Single by (G)I-dle

from the EP Heat
- Language: English; French
- Released: October 5, 2023
- Genre: Eurodance
- Length: 2:52
- Label: Cube; 88rising
- Songwriters: Michel “Lindgren” Schulz; Madison Love; Melanie Joy Fontana; Ryan Tedder
- Producer: Lindgren

(G)I-dle singles chronology
"I Do" (2023)	"I Want That" (2023)	"Wife" (2024)

Music video
- "I Want That" on YouTube

"I Want That" is a song by South Korean girl group (G)I-dle. It was released on October 5, 2023, through Cube and 88rising as the group's second original English single after "I Do" and serves as the title track of their first English-language EP, Heat. It was written by its producer Lindgren with Madison Love, Melanie Joy Fontana, and Ryan Tedder, "I Want That" is a Euro-dance song driven by a slick bassline and a kitsch-inspired production, whose lyrics depict a “psychotic and all-consuming love" story.

== Music and lyrics ==
"I Want That" is a camp Euro-dance song that incorporates pop and club dance beats, driven by a slick bassline and a kitsch inspired production. The group sings about wanting a “psychotic and all-consuming love". In line with “I want you to fall, hardest of all, until the tears roll down your face. Saying my name or nothing at all, I want it want everything.”

== Credits and personnel ==
- (G)I-dle – vocals
- Madison Love – songwriter
- Melanie Joy Fontana – songwriter
- Ryan Tedder – songwriter
- Michel “Lindgren” Schulz – songwriter, record producer
- Aaron Kim – vocal producer
- D'tour – vocal producer
- Choi Ye Ji – recording engineer, vocal mixing engineer
- Kang Seon Young – engineer
- Bill Zimmerman – engineer
- JongPil Gu – mixing engineer (Klang Studio)
- Phil Tan – – mixing engineer (Klang Studio)
- Dale Becker – mastering engineer
- Katie Harvey – assistant mastering engineer
- Nate Mingo – assistant mastering engineer
- Noah McCorkle – assistant mastering engineer

== Charts ==
Chart performance for "I Want That"
Chart (2023)	Peak position
Hong Kong (Billboard)	17
New Zealand Hot Singles (RMNZ)	28
Singapore Regional (RIAS)	23
South Korea (Circle)	195
Taiwan (Billboard)	3

== Release history ==
Release history for "I Want That"
Region	Date	Format	Label	Ref
Various	October 5, 2023	Digital download; streaming	Cube; 88rising	
