= I Do ((G)I-dle song) =

2023 single by (G)I-dle

"I Do"

Single by (G)I-dle

from the EP Heat
- Released: July 13, 2023
- Recorded: 2023
- Genre: Synth-pop
- Length: 3:10
- Label: Cube; 88rising
- Songwriters: Rogét Chahayed; Imad Royal; Blaise Railey; Drew Love
- Producers: Rogét Chahayed; Imad Royal

(G)I-dle singles chronology
"Queencard" (2023)	"I Do" (2023)	"I Want That" (2023)

Music video
- "I Do" on YouTube

"I Do" is a song by South Korean girl group (G)I-dle. It was released on July 14, 2023, through Cube and 88rising, as the group's first original English single from their first English-language EP Heat. It was written by its producers Rogét Chahayed and Imad Royal with Blaise Railey and Drew Love. Musically, it is a pop song that utilizes 1980s synth pop sound, while its lyrics revolve around a story about a lost love and the bitterness that comes with it.

Commercially, "I Do" peaked at number 26 on the Billboard US Pop Airplay and at number 39 on the New Zealand Hot Singles RMNZ. An accompanying music video was uploaded onto 88rising's YouTube channel simultaneously with the single's release and has surpassed 19 million views on the platform. On July 24, an alternative music video titled "I Do: A Love Story in Bangkok," starring Tontawan Tantivejakul and Jirawat Sutivanichsak, was posted on 88rising's YouTube account.

== Background and release ==
On May 15, 2023, the group released their sixth Korean-language I Feel, which was a commercial success debuting at number one on the Circle Chart with one million copies sold in the first week and receiving positive reviews from domestic critics. On July 10, Billboard reported a partnership between the group's parent company Cube Entertainment and the American record label 88rising, where the group would release their first English-language extended play titled Heat, with "I Do" serving as the lead single, released on July 13, 2023, on streaming platforms.

== Composition ==
"I Do" is a pop song inspired by 1980s synth-pop elements. It is characterized by "the harmonization of relaxed tempos" and electronic elements "that give it a dreamy feel," while its lyrics revolve around a "lost love of the past and the bitterness that accompanies it."

== Music video ==
An accompanying music video for "I Do" was preceded by five concept images and two teaser videos. In the video the members take on the role of a shapeshifting alien who crash lands on Earth and meets a "kind stranger who takes her in, and the pair soon fall in love." However, the duo are chased down by "mysterious men in hazmat suits," and are later cornered in a deserted warehouse. In order to save her love, the alien uses her magic powers and sacrifices herself.

An alternative music video titled "I Do: A Love Story in Bangkok," starring Tontawan Tantivejakul and Jirawat Sutivanichsak but with no appearances from (G)I-dle, was posted on 88rising's YouTube account on July 24. The video depicts Tontawan and Jirawat as students falling in love in high school before an emotional break up at prom. The video ends with the two reunited, presumably years later, after a chance encounter at a park.

== Credits and personnel ==
- (G)I-dle – vocals
- Imad Royal – songwriter, producer
- Rogét Chahayed – songwriter, producer
- Blaise Railey – songwriter
- Drew Love – songwriter
- Choi Ye-Ji – recording engineer
- Tristan Hoogland – mixing engineer
- Dale Becker – mastering engineer
- Katie Harvey – assistant mastering engineer

== Charts ==
Chart performance for "I Do"
Chart (2023)	Peak position
New Zealand Hot Singles (RMNZ)	39
South Korea BGM (Circle)	125
South Korea Download (Circle)	51
Taiwan (Billboard)	13
US Pop Airplay (Billboard)	26

== Release history ==
Release history for "I Do"
Region	Date	Format	Label	Ref
Various	July 13, 2023	Digital download; streaming	Cube; 88rising	
