= Song Ji-ho =

South Korean actor

- Born: January 28, 1992 (age 34); Busan, South Korea
- Education: Beijing Foreign Studies University
- Occupation: Actor
- Years active: 2013–present
- Agent: Inyeon Entertainment

Korean name
- Hangul: 송지호
- RR: Song Jiho
- MR: Song Chiho

Song Ji-ho (born January 28, 1992) is a South Korean actor. He is best known for his roles in the television series Stranger (2017–2020) and Doctor Cha (2023).

== Filmography ==
=== Film ===
Year	Title	Role	Notes	Ref.
2013	Friend: The Great Legacy	Jae-chil		
2014	Night Flight	Jae-yeon		
2020	Festival	Ki-won		

=== Television ===
Year	Title	Role	Notes	Ref.
2013–2014	The Eldest	Bum-suk		
2014	Emergency Couple	Medical intern	Guest	
2014	Gunman in Joseon	Nakamura		
2014	Hi! School: Love On	Seo Yo-han		
2015	D-Day	Lee Woo-sung		
2016	Memory	Chun Min-gyu		
2016	Hello, My Twenties!	Kang Yi-na's stalker		
2017	Hospital Ship	Kang Jung-ho		
2017	Drama Special: "A Bad Family"	Kim Min-guk	Season 8	
2017–2020	Stranger	Park Soon-chang	Season 1–2	
2017–2018	Jugglers	Go Myung-suk		
2018	Queen of Mystery 2	Won Joo-suk	Guest	
2018	Sketch	Jin-soo	Guest	
2018	Matrimonial Chaos	Nam Dong-goo		
2018–2019	Quiz of God	Lee Dong-geun	Season 5	
2019	Search: WWW	Choi Jung-hoon		
2020	Soul Mechanic	Shin Jong-sik	Guest (episodes 11–12)	
2021	You Are My Spring	Radio show host	Guest (episodes 3, 5, 8, 16)	
2022	Never Give Up	Kim Gun-woo		
2023	Doctor Cha	Seo Jung-min		
2024	Lovely Runner	Im Geum		
2025	Our Chocolate Moments	Jeon Soon-tae		
