= A Love So Beautiful (Thai TV series) =

2024 Thai romantic television series

- Official series poster
- Also known as: Because You Are My First Love
- Thai: เพราะเธอคือรักแรก
- Genre: Romance; Comedy; Coming-of-age
- Based on: To Our Pure Little Beauty by Zhao Qianqian
- Directed by: Kungfu Nitivat Cholvanichsiri
- Starring: Jirawat Sutivanichsak; Chanikarn Tangkabodee
- Opening theme: "ตื้อได้อายอด Due Dai Aai Ood" by Nadear Ramavadee
- Ending theme: "It's You" by Dew Jirawat
- Country of origin: Thailand
- Original language: Thai

Production
- Production location: Thailand
- Production company: GMMTV

Original release
- Network: GMM 25; Viu
- Release: June 3 – July 30, 2024

Related
- A Love So Beautiful (2017: China); A Love So Beautiful (South Korean TV series) (2020: South Korean)

A Love So Beautiful (Thai: เพราะเธอคือรักแรก; RTGS: Phro Thoe Khue Rak Raek) formally Because You Are My First Love (Thai: คน มนตร์ เวท); is a Thai romantic comedy series starring Jirawat Sutivanichsak (Dew) and Chanikarn Tangkabodee (Prim), based on the novel To Our Pure Little Beauty by Zhao Qianqian. On 22 November 2022, the teaser was aired on GMMTV Official.

== Plot ==
Som-O (Chanikarn Tangkabodee) is in love with her childhood friend Chadjen (Jirawat Sutivanichsak), but he is a shy boy who hides his love from her. When a friend of Som-O declares his love and asks her to be his girlfriend, she does not understand how to handle the situation. Chadjen continues to hide his emotions, and Som-O gets more confused about what her heart wants. Their inability to declare their true feelings for each other leads them to separation. However, Chadjen realizes his mistake and chases Som-O when he gets a second chance.

== Cast and characters ==
=== Main ===
- Jirawat Sutivanichsak (Dew) as Chadjen Paisarnsakul
- Chanikarn Tangkabodee (Prim) as Gewalin Asarattana (Som-O)

=== Supporting ===
- Trai Nimtawat (Neo) as Nakrob Sudpreecha (Tao)
- Panisara Yang (Emma) as Kwanta Jongjit (Khao)
- Jeerapat Pimanprom (Pentor) as Sassawat Jongcharoenniyom (New)
- Nipawan Taveepornsawan (Kai) as Plaifon (Som-O's mother)
- Khunakorn Kirdpan (Co) as Preecha (Som-O's father)
- Chanokwanun Rakcheep (Took) as Anya (Aun) (Chadjen's mother)
- Waranit Nitanitiphat (Frayya) as Kulasatri Chonwanitsiri (Lily), Class President
- Ramavadee Chokmanuson (Nadear) as Fahsai, Class Vice-President
- Varnvasa Singhamongkolkhet (Vasa) as Min-min, Class Secretary

== Soundtrack ==
No.	Song title	Artist	Notes	Ref.
1	"ตื้อได้อายอด Due Dai Aai Ood"	Ramavadee Chokmanuson (Nadear)	Intro theme song	
2	"It's You"	Jirawat Sutivanichsak (Dew)	Outro theme song	
