= A Love So Beautiful (South Korean TV series) =

2020-21 South Korean web series

- Promotional poster
- Hangul: 아름다웠던 우리에게
- Lit.: To Us Who Were Beautiful
- RR: Areumdawotdeon uriege
- MR: Arŭmdawŏttŏn uriege
- Genre: Romantic comedy; Coming-of-age
- Developed by: Kakao M
- Written by: Choi Yu-jeong; Jang Yu-yeon
- Directed by: Seo Min-jeong
- Starring: Kim Yo-han; So Joo-yeon; Yeo Hoe-hyun; Jo Hye-joo; Jeong Jin-hwan
- Country of origin: South Korea
- Original language: Korean
- No. of episodes: 24

Production
- Producers: Lee Min-suk; Shin Jong-su
- Running time: 21-25 minutes
- Production company: WhyNot Media

Original release
- Network: KakaoTV
- Release: December 28, 2020 – February 20, 2021

Related
- A Love So Beautiful (2017: China); A Love So Beautiful (Thai TV series) (2024: Thailand)

A Love So Beautiful (Korean: 아름다웠던 우리에게) is a South Korean television series based on the 2017 Chinese series of the same name, which is based on novel To Our Pure Little Beauty by Zhao Qianqian, which aired on Tencent Video. The series stars Kim Yo-han, So Joo-yeon, Yeo Hoe-hyun, Jo Hye-joo and Jeong Jin-hwan, is directed by Seo Min-jeong and written by Choi Yu-jeong and Jang Yu-yeon.

The plot of this coming-of-age drama revolves around the life of five high school students from youth to adulthood. It premiered on KakaoTV on December 28, 2020, and aired new episodes every Monday, Thursday, and Saturday at 17:00 (KST). It is available worldwide for streaming on Netflix.

The web series aired its last episode on February 20, 2021, garnering 37.3 million cumulative views over its run of 24 episodes.

== Synopsis ==
The series is a story of five high school friends and their journey through high school to adulthood. Seventeen-year-old Shin Sol-i (So Joo-yeon) is a cheerful female student from Chun Ji High School. She has a crush on her fellow student and neighbor Cha Heon (Kim Yo-han). She repeatedly confesses her love to Cha Heon, who appears distant, but is in fact awkward when it comes to expressing his feelings. Woo Dae-seong (Yeo Hoe-hyun), a national swimmer, transfers to Chun Ji High School and falls in love with Shin Sol-i.

== Cast ==
=== Main ===
- Kim Yo-han as Cha Heon, a warm-hearted, yet awkward and quiet teenage boy.
- So Joo-yeon as Shin Sol-i, a bubbly high school student who has a crush on her neighbor, Cha Heon.
- Yeo Hoe-hyun as Woo Dae-seong, a transfer student and swimmer who falls in love with Sol-i
- Jo Hye-joo as Kang Ha-yeong, Shin Sol-i's best friend, Jeong Jin-hwan's crush and future wife
- Jeong Jin-hwan as Jeong Jin-hwan, Shin Sol-i's best friend, Kang Ha-yeong's future husband

=== Supporting ===
- Yang Yoo-jin as Seo Ji-soo, Cha Heon's fellow doctor
- Jo Ryeon as Lee Chan-hee, Sol-i's mother
- Yoon Seo-hyun as Shin Gi-heon, Sol-i's father
- Seong Hye-min as Moon Suk-hi, the homeroom teacher
- Kim Dong-kyu as Wang Se-hyung, the atmosphere maker of the class
- Ji Hwa-seop as Lee Ju Hwan, the school nurse
- Park Ji-won as Oh Hui-ji, a classmate who has a crush on Cha Heon
- Yoo Ji-yeon as Lee Su-jin, Hui-ji's best friend
- Ki Eun-yu as Cha Geon, Cha Heon's younger brother
- Choi Bo-min as Na Mi-nyeo, a classmate and friend of Sol-i
- Kim Sung-gon as Teacher Cho
- Kim I-on as Yu-jin

== Episodes ==
No.	Title	Directed by	Written by	Original release date
1	"Love Letter"	Seo Min-jeong	Choi Yu-jeong & Jang Yu-yeon	December 28, 2020
In 2020, the bubbly Shin Sol-i (So Joo-yeon) is standing in front of Yuil High School. The flashback begins in spring 2006 when she was seventeen. Sol-i and warm-hearted introvert Cha-heon (Kim Yo-han), who live in the same building, are classmates. She has a crush on him and tries to express her feelings many times in different ways. Jeong Jin-hwan and Kang Ha-yeong, her best friends, help her in her efforts. Woo Dae-seong (Yeo Hoi-hyun), an athletic swimmer, joins the class as a transfer student. From day one, he starts liking Sol-i and calls her his brother.
2	"At the Karaoke"	Seo Min-jeong	Choi Yu-jeong & Jang Yu-yeon	December 31, 2020
The friend group of Sol-i goes to karaoke. Sol-i loses her bicycle. Dae-seong invites all his friends to his swim meet, where he wins a silver medal. Heon holds his father's memorial service alone as his mother cannot come to Korea. Sol-i goes to Heon's house to give him a bottle given by her mother. She finds Heon lying on the sofa, burning with a fever, and gives him cold compresses.
3	"Pick Me Up!"	Seo Min-jeong	Choi Yu-jeong & Jang Yu-yeon	January 2, 2021
On the day of class president election, Sol-i runs for class president and delivers a sincere speech, committing to do her best and improve herself. She loses the election by the deciding vote of Heon, who votes for Hui-ji. Sol-i kicks Heon on the shin for not voting for her. As vice-president of the class, she is assigned to collect money for the field day T-shirts, but loses the money envelope kept in her notebook by mistakenly giving it as her assignment to her teacher. Heon recovers the money from the staff room. When Miss Moon asks for the money, Sol-i admits her mistake of losing it and thanks Heon for recovering it, in front of the whole class. Miss Moon praises her, saying that everyone makes mistakes, but not everyone is courageous enough to admit them.
4	"Field Day"	Seo Min-jeong	Choi Yu-jeong & Jang Yu-yeon	January 4, 2021
Sol-i wonders how to afford a birthday present for Heon. The class finds out that the prize money for the winning class in the field day is a lot of money. She participates in a hurdle race to win, where Dae-seong and Heon try to help her out. The crew helps Ha-yeong skip class and meet her father.
5	"Drama Festival (feat. Let's Go, Baby)"	Seo Min-jeong	Choi Yu-jeong & Jang Yu-yeon	January 7, 2021
As the class forms groups to perform plays for the drama festival, Sol-i and Hui-ji both attempt to recruit Heon for their team. Dae-seong and Sol-i practice their lines for the play together. Dae-seong admits that he enjoys his time at this new school very much, since he gets to do many things that he never did before, while Ha-yeong realizes she might have a crush. A mix-up occurs during the drama festival.
6	"Don't go"	Seo Min-jeong	Choi Yu-jeong & Jang Yu-yeon	January 9, 2021
Sol-i is furious over the mishap at the drama festival and Heon's reaction afterwards. Her friends try to cheer her up, but their efforts are in vain. She considers transferring to a new school and discusses with her parents and Miss Moon, only to be discouraged by Heon.
7	"Game of Truth"	Seo Min-jeong	Choi Yu-jeong & Jang Yu-yeon	January 11, 2021
A new school year begins as Jin-hwan participates in a singing competition and successfully passes the first audition. The crew travels to the callback round to cheer him on and plans to stay out for a night after the audition is finished. Each of them tells their parents that they are staying over at their friend's house. The crew plays a game in which they write a truth on a piece of paper; each member picks up a random one and promises never reveal the truth to anyone. Sol-i finds out this way that someone in the group likes her.
8	"Happy Birthday"	Seo Min-jeong	Choi Yu-jeong & Jang Yu-yeon	January 14, 2021
Heon agrees hang out with Sol-i the next weekend, which falls on her birthday. Ha-yeong and Jin-hwan try to think of a present for her. Sol-i tries to get tickets to the match of Heon's favorite soccer club, Manchester United, where he becomes jealous of their planning for Sol-i's surprise. Upset by Heon, Sol-i eventually buys tickets for the match from her father. Things do not go as expected, but Sol-i and Heon still have a good time together.
9	"We Need to Talk"	Seo Min-jeong	Choi Yu-jeong & Jang Yu-yeon	January 16, 2021
Sol-i is uncomfortable after discovering that the note was actually from Dae-seong, who brushes it off by saying it was only a joke. Ha-yeong saves Jin-hwan from some bullies taking his money. After Heon helps Sol-i in making a good impression during a class debate, he eventually warms up to her.
10	"Don't Worry.mp3"	Seo Min-jeong	Choi Yu-jeong & Jang Yu-yeon	January 18, 2021
As a flu outbreak at the school disrupts the daily routine, Heon continues to notice Dae-seong doing nice things specifically for Sol-i. She is comforted during her short stay in the infirmary due to Heon's efforts. Hui-ji's efforts to win Heon's attention are unsuccessful.
11	"White Christmas"	Seo Min-jeong	Choi Yu-jeong & Jang Yu-yeon	January 21, 2021
With Christmas approaching, Sol-i wonders about a present for Heon. Ha-yeong tells her a card alone might not suffice since Hui-ji is knitting a scarf for him. Sol-i's parents find her card for Heon at home and wonder who she has a crush on. As everyone happily waits for snow on Christmas Eve, Sol-i gives Heon a wish bracelet and a card.
12	"Declaration of Love"	Seo Min-jeong	Choi Yu-jeong & Jang Yu-yeon	January 23, 2021
At the beginning of the new school year, the class goes on a volunteer trip to plan a barbeque party. Sol-i plans for a grand proposal to confess her feelings to Heon with the help of Ha-yeong and Jin-hwan. At the moment Heon is supposed to arrive, Hui-ji appears, leading to a misunderstanding which upsets Sol-i.
13	"Raindrop"	Seo Min-jeong	Choi Yu-jeong & Jang Yu-yeon	January 25, 2021
Sol-i is still very disappointed about what happened at the picnic. Her friends try to get to cheer her up. Dae-seong helps cheer her up, while also confronting a shoulder injury that hampers his training. Heon tries to get back on Sol-i's good side. Hui-ji is found hiding some secrets.
14	"Four-Leaf Clover"	Seo Min-jeong	Choi Yu-jeong & Jang Yu-yeon	January 28, 2021
Ha-yeong finds Hui-ji collapsed in the restroom after she has been found stealing from the nurse' office. As the schoolgirls search for a four-leaf clover to give to their crushes, Jin-hwan finds out Ha-yeong actually has a crush on someone else, causing his heart condition to worsen and he is hospitalized.
15	"University, University, University!"	Seo Min-jeong	Choi Yu-jeong & Jang Yu-yeon	January 30, 2021
The students begin developing the shortlist of the universities they would like to attend after graduation from high school. Sol-i worries whether the university Heon wants to attend would take him far away. In the end, Ha-yeong visits Jin-hwan at the hospital.
16	"Collect Our Dreams"	Seo Min-jeong	Choi Yu-jeong & Jang Yu-yeon	February 1, 2021
Heon tells his mother about his plans to attend a different university than she intended for him. When Dae-seong's grandmother goes missing, he searches for her in panic, forcing him to rethink about his priorities for his future. Dae-seong chooses to pursue swimming and leave Sol-i behind.
17	"First Kiss"	Seo Min-jeong	Choi Yu-jeong & Jang Yu-yeon	February 4, 2021
As all of her friends get into college, a depressed Sol-i is encouraged by Heon to keep trying, and he promises to help her. Thanks to him, she can retake the CSAT and gets accepted into Hankuk University as a result. The crew gathers for drinks to celebrate her acceptance, after which Heon and Sol-i have their first kiss.
18	"Love Generation"	Seo Min-jeong	Choi Yu-jeong & Jang Yu-yeon	February 6, 2021
Sol-i is elated when Heon makes their relationship official. Not wanting to worry Ha-yeong, Jin-hwan keeps a secret from her.
19	"Farewell Formula"	Seo Min-jeong	Choi Yu-jeong & Jang Yu-yeon	February 8, 2021
Struggling with her job search and putting up with Heon's demanding work schedule, Sol-i snaps when she finds out he may be leaving for the United States.
20	"It's Been A While"	Seo Min-jeong	Choi Yu-jeong & Jang Yu-yeon	February 11, 2021
With her father being hospitalized, Sol-i hurries over and bumps into Heon, who has returned to South Korea. All of their friends gather for drinks. Heon tries to win Sol-i back.
21	"Your Wedding"	Seo Min-jeong	Choi Yu-jeong & Jang Yu-yeon	February 13, 2021
As Sol-i calls Heon about his actions the night before, everyone comes together for Ha-yeong and Jin-hwan's wedding.
22	"Begin Again"	Seo Min-jeong	Choi Yu-jeong & Jang Yu-yeon	February 15, 2021
Heon shows up to a gathering in his old school uniform and gets honest about his feelings. Dae-seong decides it is time to bare his heart to Sol-i.
23	"Dear My Honey"	Seo Min-jeong	Choi Yu-jeong & Jang Yu-yeon	February 18, 2021
A lovely surprise awaits Sol-i outside Heon's hospital. The next day, Sol-i's parents come to visit her without notice.
24	"From, Honey"	Seo Min-jeong	Choi Yu-jeong & Jang Yu-yeon	February 20, 2021
Looking back on everything they have endured together, Heon recounts to Sol-i how he came to fall in love with her.

== Production ==
=== Development ===
On July 1, 2020, Kakao M announced it would broadcast a remake of the 2017 Chinese series A Love So Beautiful in the form of a miniseries which was in the early stages of production. Produced by WhyNot Media, it is scheduled to air for 24 episodes of 20 minutes each.

=== Casting ===
On July 6, 2020 it was reported that Kim Yo-han and So Joo-yeon were considering appearing in the series. On July 27, Kakao M confirmed that So Joo-yeon, Kim Yo-han and Yeo Hoe-hyun were cast in lead roles. In August, Jo Hye-joo joined the cast of the series as the protagonist's best friend.

=== Promotion ===
In December 2020, a preview video was released by Kakao M along with character sketches.

== Original soundtrack ==
A Love So Beautiful

Soundtrack album by Various
- Released: 2020–2021
- Genre: Soundtrack
- Languages: Korean; English
- Label: Kakao M

=== Part 1 ===
Released on January 11, 2021
No.	Title	Lyrics	Music	Artist	Length
1.	"Recently"	Craybin; ZWOO; Sound; ALOHA; Jaehwan; Natural Joy	Craybin; Jaehwan; ZWOO; Sound; ALOHA; Kim Daehyun; Natural Joy	Kim Yo-han	3:25
2.	"Recently" (inst.)		Craybin; Jaehwan; ZWOO; Sound; ALOHA; Kim Daehyun; Natural Joy		3:25
Total length:					6:50

=== Part 2 ===
Released on January 18, 2021
No.	Title	Lyrics	Music	Artist	Length
1.	"Lovely"	Sarah Yoon	Joo Young-hoon	SinB	4:12
2.	"Lovely" (inst.)		Joo Young-hoon		4:12
Total length:					8:24

=== Part 3 ===
Released on February 1, 2021
No.	Title	Lyrics	Music	Artist	Length
1.	"My day my night"	Honey Danji	Honey Danji	Ha Hyun-sang	3:50
2.	"My day my night" (inst.)		Honey Danji		3:50
Total length:					7:40
