= F4 Thailand: Boys Over Flowers =

2021 Thai romantic television series

- Official series poster
- Thai: หัวใจรักสี่ดวงดาว
- Genre: Romance; Drama; Comedy
- Created by: GMMTV
- Based on: Boys Over Flowers by Yoko Kamio
- Directed by: Patha Thongpan; Aticha Tanthanawigrai
- Starring: Tontawan Tantivejakul; Vachirawit Chivaaree; Jirawat Sutivanichsak; Metawin Opas-iamkajorn; Hirunkit Changkham; Chanikarn Tangkabodee
- Country of origin: Thailand
- Original language: Thai
- No. of seasons: 1
- No. of episodes: 16

Production
- Producer: Nuttapong Mongkolsawas
- Running time: 45–60 minutes
- Production companies: GMMTV; Parbdee Taweesuk

Original release
- Network: GMM 25
- Release: 18 December 2021 – 9 April 2022

Related
- Hana yori Dango (audio drama, 1993–1994: Japan); Hana yori Dango (film) (1995: Japan): Meteor Garden (2001: Taiwan); Hana Yori Dango (2005: Japan); Boys Over Flowers (2009: South Korea); Meteor Garden (2018: China)

F4 Thailand: Boys Over Flowers (Thai: F4 Thailand: หัวใจรักสี่ดวงดาว Boys Over Flowers; RTGS: Huachai Rak Si Duangdao) is a Thai romantic series starring Tontawan Tantivejakul, Vachirawit Chivaaree, Jirawat Sutivanichsak, Metawin Opas-iamkajorn and Hirunkit Changkham. Based on the Japanese manga series Hana Yori Dango by Yoko Kamio. Directed by Patha Thongpan and produced by GMMTV along with Parbdee Taweesuk, the series was first announced by GMMTV during "New & Next" event on 15 October 2019.

== Synopsis ==
Gorya (Tu) is a middle school girl who works part-time at a flower shop with her best friend Kaning (Prim) to help her family's financial condition. Her life is simple and regular, until she passes the entrance exam and receives a scholarship to a prestigious, expensive high school, turning her into the family's only hope out of poverty.

The school is famous for its seniors F4: Thyme (Bright) the group's leader, Ren (Dew), Kavin (Win), and MJ (Nani), four boys who are heirs to the country's richest billionaires. They sparkle with looks, influences and are big bullies. They display aggressive behaviors, giving "Red Cards" to anybody they dislike. Nobody dares to face them. Gorya despises their artificial lifestyle.

Gorya stands up to Thyme's bullying, leaving all the boys in awe. Gorya instantly smites Thyme who romantically pursues her, however she shows no interest because of his first impression. She has a crush on Ren, but Ren likes his childhood love, Mira (Fah). Amidst all chaos, Gorya slowly begins to fall for Thyme because of his character development and kindness. She becomes aware that Thyme's world is different.

This is a coming-of-age story of a teenage girl along with four young boys. They together go through obstacles, mistakes, friendship, encouragement, happiness and sadness. They learn about love and sense the real world of adulthood.

== Cast and characters ==
=== Main ===
- Tontawan Tantivejakul (Tu) as Thitara Jundee (Gorya) / Manga character: Tsukushi Makino

Gorya is a brave and headstrong girl who stands up against the bullies.

- Vachirawit Chivaaree (Bright) as Akira Paramaanantra (Thyme) / Manga character: Tsukasa Domyoji

Thyme is an arrogant and short-tempered leader of F4

- Jirawat Sutivanichsak (Dew) as Renrawin Aira (Ren) / Manga character: Rui Hanazawa

Ren is a quiet boy gifted at arts

- Metawin Opas-iamkajorn (Win) as Taemiyaklin Kittiyangkul (Kavin) / Manga character: Sojiro Nishikado

The playboy member of F4

- Hirunkit Changkham (Nani) as Methas Jarustiwa (MJ) / Manga character: Akira Mimasaka

The mood-maker member of F4

=== Supporting ===
- Chanikarn Tangkabodee (Prim) as Kanittha Na Bangpleang (Kaning) / Manga character: Yuki Matsuoka

Gorya's best friend and Kavin's love interest, later his girlfriend

- Cindy Bishop as Roselyn Paramaanantra / Manga character: Kaede Domyōji

Tia and Thyme's mother

- Maria Poonlertlarp as Tia Aiyawarin Paramaanantra (Tia) / Manga character: Tsubaki Domyōji

Thyme's older sister, Roselyn's elder daughter

- Yongwaree Anilbol (Fah) as Renita Asavarattanakul (Mira) / Manga character: Shizuka Todou

Ren's love interest

- Niti Chaichitathorn (Pompam) as Gawao / Manga character: Proprietress

Gorya and Kaning's boss

- Wachara Pan-iem (Jeab) as Sanchai Jundee / Manga character: Haruo Makino

Gorya's father

- Mayurin Pongpudpunth (Kik) as Busaba Jundee / Manga character: Chieko Makino

Gorya's mother

- Nattawat Jirochtikul (Fourth) as Glakao Jundee / Manga character: Susumu Makino

Gorya's brother

- Wanwimol Jaenasavamethee (June) as Vidalha Malakarn (Hana) / Manga character: Sakurako Sanjo

Gorya's friend in school who later betrays her

- Pansa Vosbein (Milk) as Lalita Empicca (Lita) / Manga character: Shigeru Okawahara

Thyme's fiancée

- Pisamai Vilaisak (Mee) as Yupin / Manga character: Tama

Thyme's family's head housekeeper

- Phatchara Tubthong (Kapook) as Jane / Manga character: Yuriko Asai

=== Guest ===
- Kanaphan Puitrakul (First) as Phupha Komolpetch / Manga character: Takayuki Kimoto (Ep. 1, 6, 11)
- Luke Ishikawa Plowden as Dominique Shun / Manga character: Jean P. Mayol (Ep. 6)
- Chanagun Arpornsutinan (Gunsmile) as Tesla / Manga character: Nakatsuka (Kaning's boyfriend) (Ep. 6–7)
- Kay Lertsittichai as Mahasamut Komolpetch (Talay) / Manga character: Junpei Oribe (Ep. 8–11)
- Ployshompoo Supasap (Jan) as Aum Natnada Saentaweesuk

MJ's love interest, later his girlfriend in "The Secret Story of Iris". (Ep. 9–16)

- Neen Suwanamas as Mona / Manga character: Sara Hinata

Kavin's first love (Ep. 12–13)

== Production ==
On 15 October 2019, the series was announced. On 16 September 2020, GMMTV officially revealed the cast, with Vachirawit Chivaaree as lead "Thyme", Metawin Opas-iamkajorn as "Kavin", along with debutants Tontawan Tantivejakul, Hirunkit Changkham and Jirawat Sutivanichsak.

GMMTV acquired the rights to create the Thai adaptation of Boys Over Flowers. Sataporn Panichraksapong, the managing director, highlighted that the series has positive message and contains social issues that are relevant to the current Thai society. Parbdee Taweesuk's took over the production of the series.

The final official trailer was released on 3 December 2021. The series aired at GMM 25 on 18 December 2021. It streamed internationally through GMMTV's official YouTube channel and on Viu.

== Soundtrack ==
No.	Song title	Artist	Ref.
1	"Who Am I"	Vachirawit Chivaaree (Bright), Jirawat Sutivanichsak (Dew), Metawin Opas-iamkajorn (Win) & Hirunkit Changkham (Nani)	
2	"Shooting Star"	Vachirawit Chivaaree (Bright), Jirawat Sutivanichsak (Dew), Metawin Opas-iamkajorn (Win) & Hirunkit Changkham (Nani)	
3	"In the Wind"	Jirawat Sutivanichsak (Dew)	
4	"โลกของฉันคือเธอ (You Mean the World)"	Gawin Caskey (Fluke)	
5	"One Last Cry"	Violette Wautier	
6	"Nighttime"	Vachirawit Chivaaree (Bright)	
7	"Best Life"	Hirunkit Changkham (Nani)	
8	"แสงที่ปลายฟ้า (Silhouette)"	Metawin Opas-iamkajorn (Win)	

== Reception ==
F4 Thailand ranked 1st in "Top Thai Romance Series" to watch online. F4 Thailand was ranked a popular adaptation of the manga Hana Yori Dango in online polls. On 11 December 2021, the making of the series F4 Thailand Begins was showcased, which had around 0.98% viewership. By November 2023, the series had over 600M views on GMMTV's official YouTube channel.

== Shooting Star Asia tour ==
Owing to the series international popularity, the Shooting Star Asia concert tour was held across Southeast and East Asia.

Sl No.	Date	Venue	Location	Ref.
1	23 July 2022	Hall 6, Union Mall	Bangkok Thailand	
2	15 October 2022	The Kasablanka Hall	Jakarta Indonesia	
3	5 November 2022	Tropicana Gardens Mall Convention Center	Kuala Lumpur Malaysia	
4	19 November 2022	World Trade Centre Metro Manila	Manila Philippines	
5	5 February 2023	Taipei International Convention Center	Taipei Taiwan	
6	18 February 2023	Asia World Summit	Hong Kong	
7	4 March 2023	Military Zone 7 Indoor Sports Complex	Hi Chi Minh City Vietnam	
8	11 March 2023	The Star Theatre	Singapore	
9	18–19 March 2023	Pia Arena MM	Yokohama Japan	
10	2 April 2023	Yes24 Live Mall	Seoul South Korea	
11	7 October 2023	Union Mall	Bangkok Thailand	

== Viewership ratings and rankings ==
- In the table below, the blue number represents the lowest ratings and the red number represents the highest ratings in Thailand.

Episode	Original broadcast date	Title	Average audience share	Thailand Trend	Worldwide Trend	Ref.
1	18 December 2021	"The Footprint of Meteor"	0.276%	1	4	
2	25 December 2021	"The Second Impact"	0.404%	1	4	
3	8 January 2022	"The Paper Plane"	0.440%	1	2	
4	15 January 2022	"The Broken Door"	0.558%	1	9	
5	22 January 2022	"The Glass Mask"	0.431%	1	8	
6	29 January 2022	"The Tulip Mania"	0.494%	1	2	
7	5 February 2022	"The Four Flowers"	0.334%	1	5	
8	12 February 2022	"The Present Perfect"	0.473%	1	11	
9	19 February 2022	"The Incident of 1%"	0.456%	1	3	
10	26 February 2022	"The Time Machine"	0.670%	1	9	
11	5 March 2022	"The Atonement"	0.662%	1	2	
12	12 March 2022	"The Scripted Relationship"	0.385%	1	5	
13	19 March 2022	"The Rooftop of Tomorrow"	0.443%	1	5	
14	26 March 2022	"The Chessboard"	0.248%	1	8	
15	2 April 2022	"The Neverland"	0.295%	1	14	
16	9 April 2022	"The Meteor Shower"	0.489%	1	2	
Average ^{1}			0.441%	—N/a		

^1 Based on the average audience share per episode.

== Awards and nominations ==
Year	Award	Category	Nominated Work	Result	Ref.
2022	Thailand Zocial Award 2022	Best Entertainment Performance on Social Media: Actor Category	Bright Vachirawit Chivaaree	Won	
2022	Siamrath Online Award 2022	Popular Actor	Bright Vachirawit Chivaaree	Won	
2022	Kazz Awards 2022	Popular Male Teenager	Bright Vachirawit Chivaaree	Won	
2022	Kazz Awards 2022	Best Scene	Bright Vachirawit Chivaaree & Tu Tontawan Tantivejakul	Nominated	
2022	The 3rd Mani Mekhala Awards (2022)	The Most Public Popular Male Celebrity Award	Bright Vachirawit Chivaaree	Won	
2022	The 3rd Mani Mekhala Awards (2022)	Charismatic Superstar Award	Bright Vachirawit Chivaaree	Won	
2022	The 3rd Mani Mekhala Awards (2022)	Outstanding Female Rising Star	Tu Tontawan Tantivejakul	Won	
2022	The 3rd Mani Mekhala Awards (2022)	Outstanding Male Rising Star	Dew Jirawat Sutivanichsak	Won	
2022	The 3rd Mani Mekhala Awards (2022)	Outstanding Supporting Actor	Win Metawin Opas-iamkajorn	Won	
2022	ContentAsia Awards	Best Original Song: For Movie or An Asian TV Program	"Night Time" – Vachirawit Chivaaree	Nominated	
2022	ContentAsia Awards	Best Original Song: For Movie or An Asian TV Program	"Who Am I"	Nominated	
2022	27th Asian Television Awards (ATA)	Best Theme Song	"Who Am I"	Nominated	
2022	27th Asian Television Awards (ATA)	Best Adaptation of an Existing Format	F4 Thailand: Boys Over Flowers	Won	
2022	27th Asian Television Awards (ATA)	Best Actress in a Supporting Role	Prim Chanikarn Tangkabodee	Won	
2022	Asian Academy Creative Awards (AAA) 2022: National Winners	Best Theme Song or Title Theme	"Who Am I"	Won	
2022	Asian Academy Creative Awards (AAA) 2022: National Winners	Outstanding Supporting Actor	Win Metawin Opas-iamkajorn	Won	
2022	Asian Academy Creative Awards (AAA) 2022: National Winners	Best Cinematography	Pramett Chankrasae, Wongwattana Chunhavuttiyanon, Chaiyapreuk Chalermpornpanit	Won	
2022	Asian Academy Creative Awards (AAA) 2022: National Winners	Best Editing	Teeraphat Charoenphakdee, Putthipath Akharacharoenhiran, Krich Towiwat	Won	
2022	Asian Academy Creative Awards (AAA) 2022: National Winners	Best Actress	Tu Tontawan Tantivejakul	Nominated	
2022	Asian Academy Creative Awards (AAA) 2022: National Winners	Best Director	Patha Thongpan	Won	
2022	Mint Award 2022	Series of 2022	F4 Thailand: Boys Over Flowers	Won	
2022	GQ Men of the Year Awards 2022	Actor of the Year	Bright Vachirawit Chivaaree	Won	
2022	GQ Men of the Year Awards 2022	Actress of the Year	Tu Tontawan Tantivejakul	Won	
2023	Sanook Awards 2022	Actor of the Year	Bright Vachirawit Chivaaree	Nominated	
2023	Daradaily Awards 2022	Best Actor	Bright Vachirawit Chivaaree	Won	
2023	Pantip Television Awards 2022	Best Photography	Lee Thaweesuk	Won	
2023	Maya TV Awards 2023	Female Rising Star of the Year	Prim Chanikarn Tangkabodee	Nominated	
2023	14th Nataraja Awards	Best Cast Ensemble	F4 Thailand: Boys Over Flowers	Nominated	
