= So Joo-yeon =

South Korean actress (born 1993)

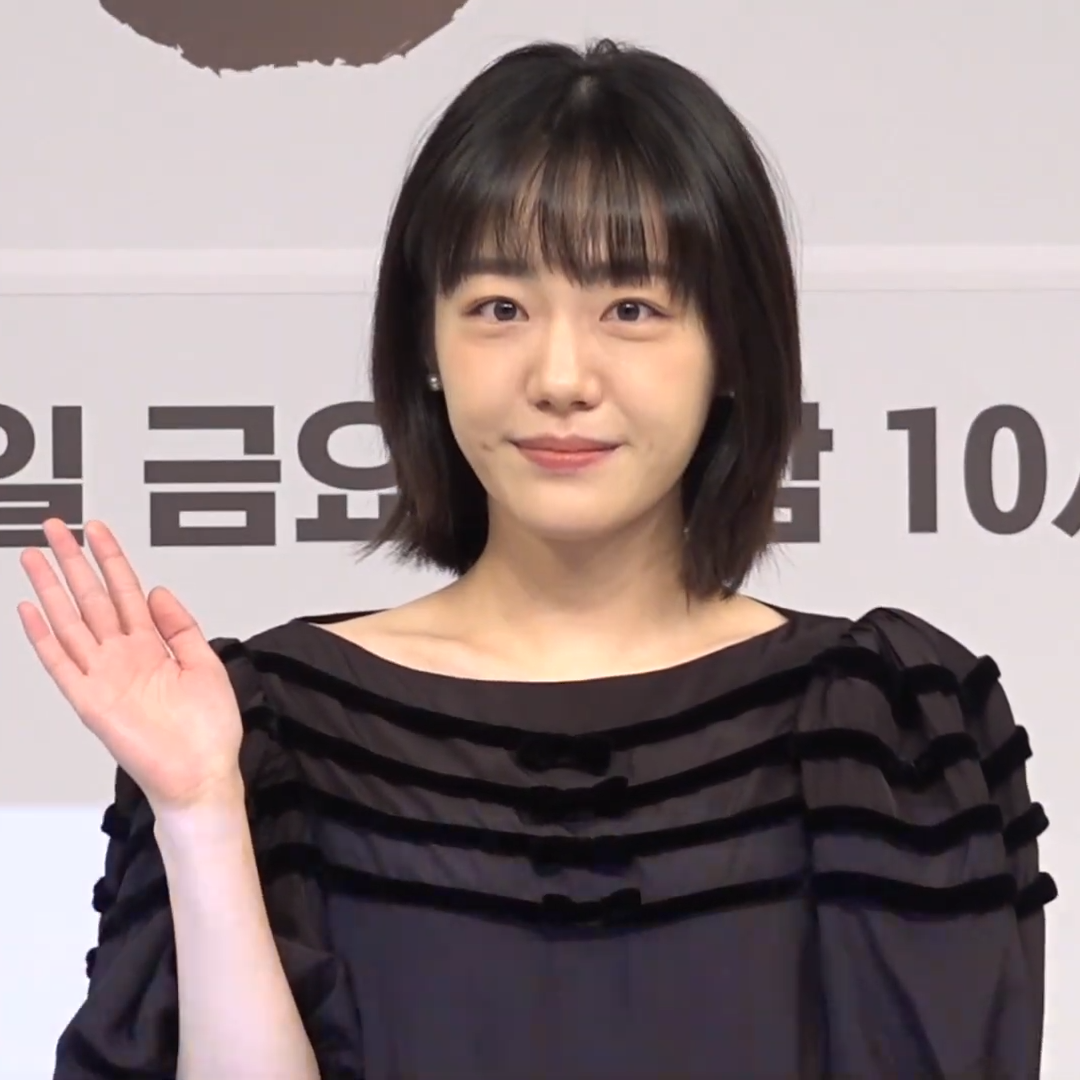
- So in April 2023
- Born: December 31, 1993 (age 32)
- Occupations: Actress; model
- Years active: 2018–present
- Agent: Merry Go Round Entertainment

Korean name
- Hangul: 소주연
- RR: So Juyeon
- MR: So Chuyŏn

So Joo-yeon (Korean: 소주연; born December 31, 1993) is a South Korean model and actress. She starred in the Korean television series Dr. Romantic 2 (2020).

== Career ==
=== 2018–present: Modelling and acting debut ===
So is a model under LSAC Model. She made her acting film debut in The Whispering and the television series Not Alright, But It's Alright. She had lead roles in My Healing Love and I Hate Going To Work. She was also cast in Wild Guys. In 2020, So played the role of Yoon Ah-reum in Dr. Romantic 2 alongside Han Suk-kyu, Lee Sung-kyung, Ahn Hyo-seop, Kim Min-jae, and more.

In 2021, she had starring roles in Lovestruck in the City and A Love So Beautiful.

On September 24, 2024, So signed an exclusive contract with Merry Go Round Entertainment.

== Filmography ==
=== Film ===
Year	Title	Role	Notes	Ref.
2018	The Whispering	Eun-ha		
2020	The Therapist: Fist of Tae-Baek	Ju-yeon	Cameo	
2020	Festival	Kyung Mi	Independent film	
TBA	Dial Girl Lediee	Yura	Short film	

=== Television series ===
Year	Title	Role	Notes	Ref.
2018	My Healing Love	Yang Eun-joo		
2019	I Hate Going To Work	Lee Yoo-jin		
2020–2023	Dr. Romantic	Yoon Ah-reum	Season 2–3	
2020	Birthcare Center	Alex Choi	Cameo (Episode 6)	
2021	Drama Special – "Three"	Kim Jong-hee		
2024	The Midnight Romance in Hagwon	Nam Cheong-mi		
2025	Our Chocolate Moments	Joo Seul-gi		
2025-2026	Pro Bono	Park Gi-ppeum		

=== Web series ===
Year	Title	Role	Ref.
2018	Not Alright, But It's Alright	Kim Ji-an	
2019	Wild Guys	Lee Jin-joo	
2020–2021	Lovestruck in the City	Seo Rin-yi	
2020–2021	A Love So Beautiful	Shin Sol-yi	
2022	Seasons of Blossom	Han So-mang	

== Awards and nominations ==
Name of the award ceremony, year presented, category, nominee of the award, and the result of the nomination
Award ceremony	Year	Category	Nominee / work	Result	Ref.
Korea Drama Awards	2023	Best Supporting Actress	Dr. Romantic 3	Won	
SBS Drama Awards	2020	Best New Actress	Dr. Romantic 2	Won	
SBS Drama Awards	2023	Excellence Award, Actress in a Seasonal Drama	Dr. Romantic 3	Nominated	
