= Yeo Hoe-hyun =

South Korean actor

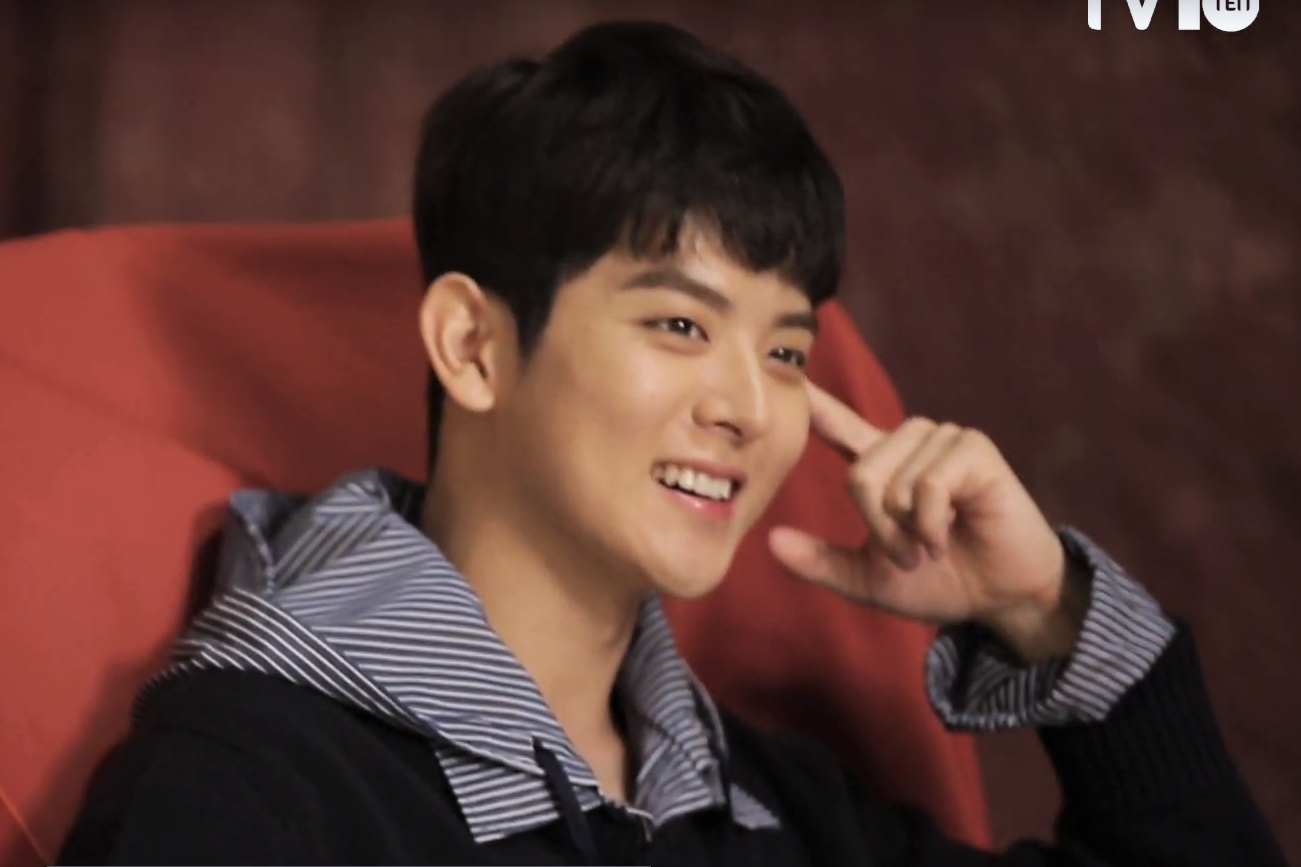
- Yeo in 2018
- Born: May 9, 1994 (age 32); Seoul, South Korea
- Occupation: Actor
- Years active: 2014–present
- Agent: Elefun Entertainment

Korean name
- Hangul: 여회현
- Hanja: 呂會鉉
- RR: Yeo Hoehyeon
- MR: Yŏ Hoehyŏn

Yeo Hoe-hyun (Korean: 여회현; born May 9, 1994) is a South Korean actor.

== Filmography ==
=== Film ===
Year	Title	Role	Ref.
2014	Still, Life Goes On		
2016	With or Without You	Young-dal	
2016	The Last Princess	young Kim Jang-han	
2018	The Great Battle	Ma-ro	

=== Television series ===
Year	Title	Role	Notes	Ref.
2014	Pinocchio	Dal-po's classmate		
2015	Unkind Ladies			
2015	Great Stories: "Entrance Exam"			
2015	Eve's Love	Jin Do-joon		
2015	Six Flying Dragons	Sungkyunkwan Confucian Scholar		
2016	Jang Yeong-sil	Na Ki-soon		
2016	Reply 1988	Duk-seon's Blind Date		
2016	Memory	Lee Seung-ho		
2016	Secret Healer	Crown Prince Sunhoe		
2016	The Doctors	Choi Young-soo	Cameo, Ep17-18	
2016	Soloman's Perjury	Lee Tae-woo	Cameo	
2017	Girls’ Generation 1979	Son-jin		
2017	Drama Special: "Waltzing Alone"	Ku Gun-hee	One act drama	
2017	While You Were Sleeping	young Lee Yoo-bum		
2018	Short	Park Eun-ho		
2018	Marry Me Now	Park Jae-hyung		
2019	Leverage	Jeong Eui-sang		
2020	Oh My Baby	Kim (Sperm Donor)	Cameo	
2020	A Love So Beautiful	Woo Dae-sung	Web drama	

=== Web series ===
Year	Title	Role	Notes	Ref.
2017	Unrequited Love 3	Yeo Hoe-hyun	Web drama	
2017	Crushes - Special Edition	Yeo Hoe-hyun	Web drama	
2022	Kiss Sixth Sense	Cafe employee	Cameo (Ep. 1)	

== Awards and nominations ==
Year	Award	Category	Nominated work	Result	Ref.
2017	31st KBS Drama Awards	Best Actor in a One-Act/Special/Short Drama	Girls' Generation 1979; Waltzing Alone	Won	
2018	11th Korea Drama Awards	Best New Actor	Marry Me Now	Nominated	
