= Oops! Mr. Superstar Hit on Me =

2022 Thai television series

- Official series poster
- Thai: ซุป'ตาร์กับหญ้าอ่อน
- Genre: Romantic comedy
- Based on: Sup'tar Kap Ya On (ซุป'ตาร์กับหญ้าอ่อน) by Rose (โรส)
- Directed by: Pin Kriengkraisakul
- Starring: Methika Jiranorraphat; Nawat Kulrattanarak
- Opening theme: "พิสูจน์ (Prove It)" by Sizzy
- Country of origin: Thailand
- Original language: Thai
- No. of episodes: 12

Production
- Running time: 42 minutes
- Production companies: GMMTV; On & On Infinity

Original release
- Network: GMM 25; Viu
- Release: 20 June – 26 July 2022

Oops! Mr. Superstar Hit on Me (Thai: ซุป'ตาร์กับหญ้าอ่อน; RTGS: Sup'tar Kap Ya On) is a Thai romantic comedy television series directed by Pin Kriengkraisakul, starring Methika Jiranorraphat (Jane) and Nawat Kulrattanarak (Pong). Adapted from the novel of the same name by Rose (โรส) and produced by GMMTV together with On & On Infinity, it was announced as one of the television series of GMMTV for 2022 during their "GMMTV2022: BORDERLESS" event held on December 1, 2021. It officially premiered on GMM 25 and Viu on June 20, 2022, and ran until July 26, 2022.

== Synopsis ==
Ton Naruebet (Pong Nawat), a prominent Thai celebrity, engages in a brief encounter with Cake (Jane Methika), a 20-year-old entertainment intern, under the false impression that a friend sent her to his hotel room as a sex worker. Cake’s actual motive was simply to obtain an autograph for her mother, Kanda (Nicole Theriault), an avid admirer of Ton. Seeking to take responsibility for the misunderstanding, a remorseful Ton subsequently tries to contact Cake. His efforts are blocked by his nephew and personal manager, Nadol (Fluke Pusit), who mistakenly labels Cake an opportunist capitalizing on a star's fame and prevents all communication between them.

The situation escalates further when Cake discovers she is pregnant from their encounter. Believing Ton has intentionally cut ties with Cake, her close friend Manow (Milk Pansa) shares a social media post accusing the star of preying on a young woman. The resulting public uproar severely impacts Ton's career, prompting him to bypass his manager and quickly contact Cake directly, as he ultimately wants to start over with her as his life partner.

== Cast and characters ==
=== Main ===
- Methika Jiranorraphat (Jane) as Cake
- Nawat Kulrattanarak (Pong) as Ton Naruebet

=== Supporting ===
- Nicole Theriault as Kanda (Cake's mother)
- Pansa Vosbein (Milk) as Manow "Now"
- Pusit Dittapisit (Fluke) as Nadol (Ton's nephew and manager)
- Gawin Caskey as D-Day
- Pimthong Washirakom (Dao) as Pat
- Juthapich Indrajundra (Jamie) as Tan (Ton's sister)
- Tharatorn Jantharaworakarn (Boom) as Sunny
- Thanaboon Wanlopsirinun (Na) as Chaochao
- Wasana Sitthiwet (Koi) as Nom

=== Guest ===
- Naravit Lertratkosum as unnamed actor (Ep. 12)
