= Moonshadow (TV series) =

2026 Thai television series

- Official series poster
- Thai: เงาใต้พระจันทร์
- Genre: Girls' love; Romantic drama
- Based on: Moonshadow (เงาใต้พระจันทร์) by Flower of Memory (ดอกไม้แห่งความทรงจำ)
- Screenplay by: Naphat Chitveerapat; Lalil Kittitanaphan
- Directed by: Kanittha Kwunyoo
- Starring: Thasorn Klinnium; Pattraphus Borattasuwan
- Country of origin: Thailand
- Original language: Thai
- No. of episodes: 10

Production
- Executive producers: Sataporn Panichraksapong; Darapa Choeysanguan
- Producers: Sita Vosbein; Kanittha Kwunyoo; Noppharnach Chaiyahwimhon
- Cinematography: Tanai Nimcharoenpong; Theerapan Boossabong; Weeranuch Laometakone
- Running time: 50–67 minutes
- Production companies: GMMTV; Nar-ra-tor

Original release
- Network: GMM 25; OneD
- Release: 12 August – 14 October 2026

Moonshadow (Thai: เงาใต้พระจันทร์; RTGS: Ngao Tai Phra Chan; lit. 'Shadow Under the Moon') is a 2026 Thai girls' love television series directed by Kanittha Kwunyoo (Fon), starring Thasorn Klinnium (Emi) and Pattraphus Borattasuwan (Bonnie).

Adapted from the novel of the same name by Flower of Memory (ดอกไม้แห่งความทรงจำ) and produced by GMMTV together with Nar-ra-tor, the series was announced as one of the television series of GMMTV for 2026 during their GMMTV 2026: Magic Vibes Maximized event on 25 November 2025.

It premiered on GMM 25 on 12 August 2026, airing every Wednesday at 20:30 ICT. It was made available for streaming on YouTube and OneD app in selected regions.

== Synopsis ==
Chan (Thasorn Klinnium), a successful businesswoman, has a one-night stand with Key (Pattraphus Borattasuwan), an attractive young woman who persistently pursues her and offers to become her sugar baby just to be close to her. Although Chan initially refuses to take the encounter further and sets strict rules to keep the relationship casual, Key's playfulness and affection eventually win her over, leading them to fall in love. However, their relationship becomes complicated when Jay (Rachanun Mahawan), Chan's first love who previously abandoned her to get married, suddenly returns to her life, leaving Chan torn between her past feelings and her new romance with Key.

== Cast and characters ==
=== Main ===
- Thasorn Klinnium (Emi) as Chan / Sun
- Pattraphus Borattasuwan (Bonnie) as Kiran Mahattanakit (Key)

=== Supporting ===
- Rachanun Mahawan (Film) as Jay
- Tipnaree Weerawatnodom (Namtan) as Elle
- Juthapich Indrajundra (Jamie) as Peach
- Kay Lertsittichai as Phu
- Chayapol Jutamas (AJ) as Game
- Pete Thongchua as Phasin
- Supranee Charoenpol (Kai) as Carat
- Sarocha Watittapan (Tao) as Phin
- Apasiri Nitibhon (Um) as Janya
- Duangta Tungkamani (Took) as Monruedee

== Soundtrack ==
Moonshadow Soundtrack
No.	Title	Writer(s)	Artist	Length
1.	"Red Kiss"	Pure Kanin; Jeaniich	Emi Thasorn; Bonnie Pattraphus	3:45
2.	"Glitch (เพลงรักที่ยังไม่ลืม)"	Pure Kanin; Jeaniich	Emi Thasorn	4:12
3.	"Your One (จะรักให้จำ)"	Pure Kanin; Jeaniich	Bonnie Pattraphus	3:38
4.	"Moonkey (กุญแจพระจันทร์)"	Pure Kanin; Jeaniich	Emi Thasorn; Bonnie Pattraphus	3:24
5.	"Chua Khrao Rue Khang Khuen Talot Pai (ชั่วคราวหรือค้างคืนตลอดไป)"	Narongvit Techathanawat	Emi Thasorn; Bonnie Pattraphus	3:53
