= Us (Thai TV series) =

2025 Thai television series

- Official series poster
- Thai: Us รักของเรา
- Genre: Girls' love; Romantic drama
- Based on: Us: รักของเรา by Chao Planoy (เจ้าปลาน้อย)
- Written by: Naphat Chitveerapat; Lalil Kittitanaphan; Nichaphat Buranadilok
- Directed by: Kanittha Kwunyoo
- Starring: Thasorn Klinnium; Pattraphus Borattasuwan
- Country of origin: Thailand
- Original language: Thai
- No. of episodes: 12

Production
- Running time: 50–76 minutes
- Production companies: GMMTV; Nar-ra-tor

Original release
- Network: GMM 25; YouTube
- Release: 18 January – 5 April 2025

Us (Thai: รักของเรา; RTGS: Rak Khong Rao; lit. 'Our Love') is a Thai girls' love television series starring Thasorn Klinnium (Emi) and Pattraphus Borattasuwan (Bonnie). Adapted from the novel of the same name and produced by GMMTV together with Nar-ra-tor, it was announced at the GMMTV 2024: Up & Above Part 2 event on 23 April 2024. It is also the third girls' love series produced by GMMTV.

The series premiered on GMM 25 on 18 January 2025, airing on Saturdays at 20:30 ICT, and concluded on 5 April 2025.

== Synopsis ==
In order to get away from her controlling father, 19-year-old Dokrak (Pattraphus Borattasuwan) chooses to live alone and take a year off after graduating from high school. She begins to work part-time at a cafe in the "Art & Us" painting gallery, where she meets 22-year-old Pam (Thasorn Klinnium), a dental student who often visits the cafe. This allows Dokrak to get to know Pam and secretly admires her. Until 27-year-old Kawi (Harit Cheewagaroon), Dokrak's medical student brother, meets Pam by chance and falls in love with her at first sight. Kawi asks Dokrak to act as a matchmaker between him and Pam. This forces Dokrak to hold back her feelings because she knows she can't love her brother's girlfriend. How will Dokrak's love for Pam continue in the end?

== Cast and characters ==
=== Main ===
- Thasorn Klinnium (Emi) as Pharawee Preechakosol (Pam)
- Pattraphus Borattasuwan (Bonnie) as Kanda Chitrarak (Dokrak)

=== Supporting ===
- Harit Cheewagaroon (Sing) as Kawi (Dokrak's brother and Pam's boyfriend)
- Benyapa Jeenprasom (View) as Oat (Rim House Bar owner)
- Rattanawadee Wongthong (Mim) as Nene (Pam's colleague and Khem's illegitimate daughter)
- Penpetch Benyakul (Jab) as Khem, Dokrak and Kawi's father
- Ramavadee Nakchudtree (Pupae) as Orn, Dokrak and Kawi's mother
- Sansanee Wattananukul (Nid) as Bua (Pam's grandmother)
- Pumpkin as Titang (Pam's neighbor)
- Leo Saussay as Aek, Art & Us Café owner
- Patsit Permpoonsavat (Soodyacht) as Peem (Café employee and Dokrak's friend)
- Samantha Melanie Coates (Sammy) as Natcha (Café employee and Dokrak's friend)

=== Guest ===
- Singha Luangsuntorn as Koi (Ep. 9), Khem's illegitimate daughter

== Soundtrack ==
Song title	English title	Artist	Ref.
ไม่อยากจูบเธอในฝัน	"Kissin' Out of Dream"	SIN	
—N/a	"Between Us"	Bonnie Pattraphus	
มากกว่าที่รัก	"More Than Words"	Emi Thasorn	
ไม่อยากจูบเธอในฝัน	"Kissin' Out of Dream"	Emi Thasorn, Bonnie Pattraphus	
