= Mouse (Thai TV series) =

2025 Thai television series

- Official series poster
- Genre: Crime thriller; Suspense; Mystery; Sci-Fi
- Based on: Mouse by Choi Ran
- Screenplay by: Teekhadet Vucharadhanin
- Directed by: Haeman Chatemee
- Starring: Chanon Santinatornkul; Shahkrit Yamnam; Raviyanun Takerd; Thasorn Klinnium; Chonlathorn Kongyingyong
- Country of origin: Thailand
- Original language: Thai
- No. of episodes: 20

Production
- Executive producers: Ari Arijitsatien; Birathon Kasemsri Na Ayudhaya; Michael Jung; Suphachai Chearavanont
- Producers: Kornkunrat Pornpanarittichai; Phattaranit Peerakittirat
- Running time: 70 minutes
- Production companies: True Corporation; True CJ Creations

Original release
- Network: TrueID
- Release: 1 August – 17 October 2025

Related
- Mouse (2021)

Mouse is a 2025 Thai television series starring Chanon Santinatornkul (Nonkul), Shahkrit Yamnam (Krit), Raviyanun Takerd (Ben), Thasorn Klinnium (Emi) and Chonlathorn Kongyingyong (Captain). Directed by Haeman Chatemee and produced by True CJ Creations, it is a remake of the South Korean drama of the same name written by Choi Ran. The series aired on TrueID from August 1, 2025, to October 17, 2025. The series was divided into two parts: Part 1 aired on August 1, 2025, for seven episodes, while Part 2 aired from September 5 to October 17, 2025, for thirteen episodes.

== Synopsis ==
The story takes place in Makhawat, where Ramil's parents were killed 25 years ago in a string of murders. Ramil (Shahkrit Yamnam) was driven by wrath, but the police eventually captured the culprit, Orachun (Penpetch Benyakul), a doctor who murdered people for scientific purposes. At the time, the government attempted to address the city's crime problem by enacting legislation mandating abortions for fetuses with the psychopathic gene. 25 years later, a new series of killings occurs, with the culprit laying gold leaf on the bodies.

Ramil, who is now a police officer, must conduct an investigation with Wit (Chanon Santinatornkul), his subordinate colleague. The first victim is burned alive, then a second is murdered, followed by the third, fourth, and fifth. The cops discover indications that connect the crime to someone else. In the meantime, Ramil receives a call from the murderer, encouraging him to take part in a game show where a child is being held hostage.

== Cast and characters ==
=== Main ===
- Chanon Santinatornkul (Nonkul) as Patcharawit
- Shahkrit Yamnam (Krit) as Ramil
- Raviyanun Takerd (Ben) as Chanya
- Thasorn Klinnium (Emi) as Phicha
- Chonlathorn Kongyingyong (Captain) as Kan

=== Supporting ===
- Dhanyabhorn Sondhikandha (Joy) as Jirawan
- Wattana Kumthorntip (Gift) as Danai
- Penpetch Benyakul (Jab) as Orachun
- Kajornsak Rattananissai as Phithak
- Yarinda Bunnag (Nina) as Bussarin
