= Methika Jiranorraphat =

Thai-Taiwanese actress and singer (born 1999)

- เมธิกา จีรนรภัทร
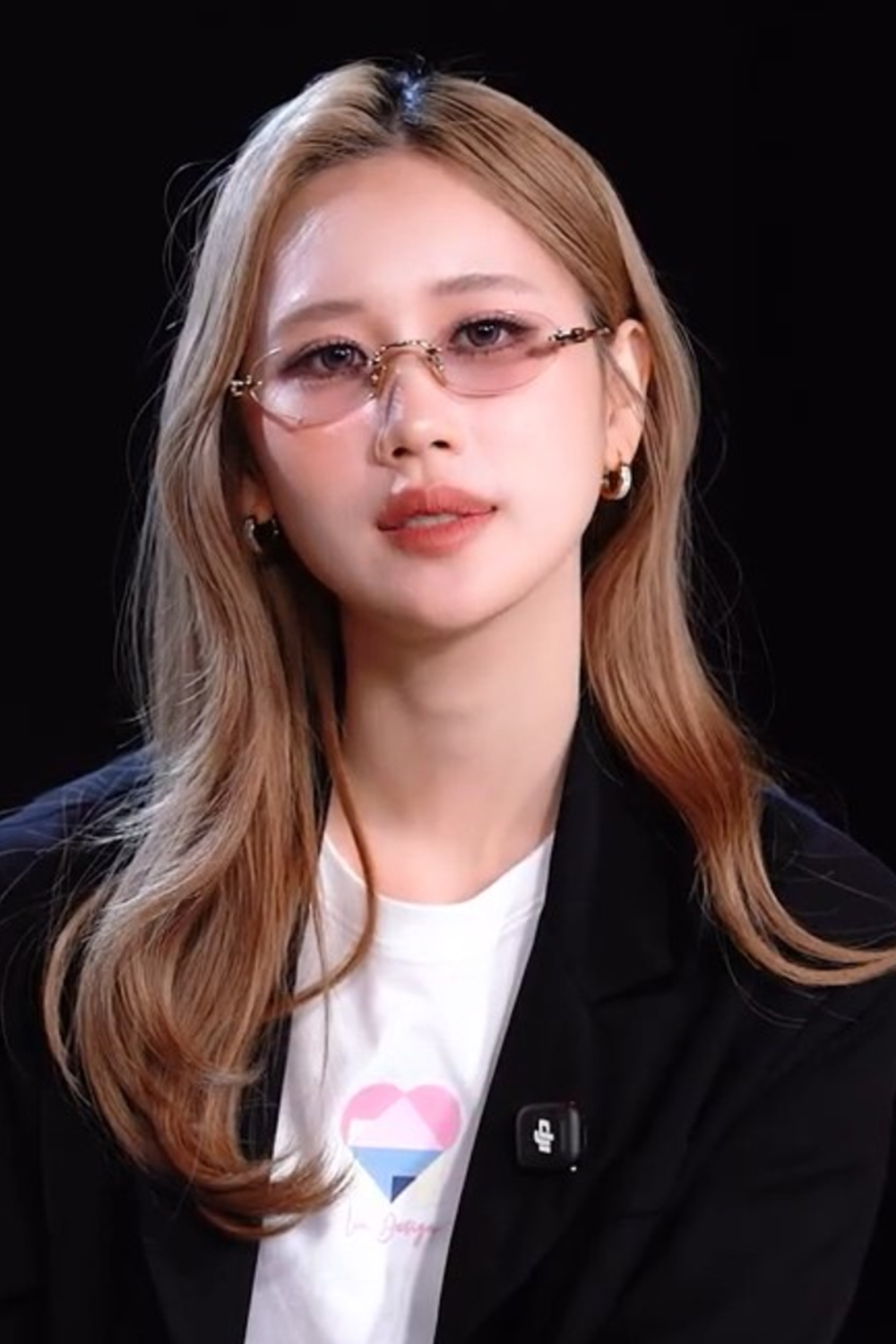
- Methika in November 2025
- Born: Ramida Jiranorraphat (รมิดา จีรนรภัทร); June 19, 1999 (age 27); Bangkok, Thailand
- Other names: Jane (เจน), Janeyeh (เจนเย่)
- Education: Bangkok University
- Occupations: Actress; singer; model
- Years active: 2015–present
- Agents: GMMTV (2016–2024); Jenova Studio (2024–present); TB Entertainment (2026–present)
- Known for: Claire in The Gifted; White in Home School; Faye in Beauty Newbie; Xiao Yu in Mad Unicorn; Rin in Love Design
- Musical career
- Genre: T-pop
- Instrument: Vocals
- Labels: GMMTV Records; Riser Music
- Formerly of: Sizzy

Methika Jiranorraphat (Thai: เมธิกา จีรนรภัทร; born 19 June 1999), formerly Ramida Jiranorraphat (Thai: รมิดา จีรนรภัทร), nicknamed Jane (Thai: เจน) or Janeyeh (Thai: เจนเย่), is a Thai-Taiwanese actress and singer. She is a former member of the girl group Sizzy under Riser Music. She first gained recognition for her roles in My Dear Loser: Edge of 17 (2017), The Gifted (2018), Home School (2023), and Beauty Newbie (2024). Her work has earned critical recognition, including nominations at the Asian Academy Creative Awards, Asian Television Awards, and the Nataraja Awards. Following her departure from GMMTV, Methika launched an independent acting career and received widespread acclaim for her lead role in the 2025 Netflix original series Mad Unicorn and in the Thai girls' love series Love Design.

== Names ==
Janeyeh, also known as Methika Jiranorraphat (Ramida Jiranorraphat), was born in Bangkok, Thailand. She is of Chinese descent, with a Teochew mother and a Taiwanese father, and is the youngest of three children. Her Chinese name originally was Ye Zhen (Chinese: 葉臻; pinyin: Yè Zhēn), but it was later changed to Ye Zhiyu (Chinese: 葉芷妤; pinyin: Yè Zhǐyú). In January 2025, XOXO Entertainment announced that Methika Jiranorraphat (Jane) will star in KNOMJEAN's music video for "แค่เอาคืน", alongside Supassara Thanachat (Kao). At the time of the announcement, Janeyeh confirmed that she had legally changed her given name from Ramida to Methika.

== Education ==
Janeyeh graduated from Sarasas Witaed Bangbon School by passing an equivalency test and enrolled directly into School of Communication Arts at the Bangkok University, obtaining her bachelor's degree in 2020.

== Career ==
Janeyeh began her career in the entertainment industry after placing as the second runner-up in the Miss Teen Thailand 2014 pageant. Prior to that, she had auditioned for major South Korean entertainment companies JYP Entertainment and YG Entertainment, but she was not accepted.

Her entry into acting came unexpectedly. In 2015, she accompanied a friend to an audition for the television series Love Sick and was unexpectedly cast in the role of Tai, marking her official acting debut. The role introduced her to the Thai television audience and led to additional appearances in its spinoff, The School, and in Room Alone 2 later that year. In 2016, she signed with GMMTV, one of Thailand's leading entertainment companies, and appeared in several youth-oriented productions, including Part Time: The Series (as White), Lovey Dovey (as the younger version of Kookai), and U-Prince (as Loma).

Her career began to gain momentum in 2017, a turning point marked by her transition from supporting roles to leading performances. She portrayed Kanomphing in Med in Love and made her film debut in the Chinese production, My Subject God, as Jiang Yue. Her first breakout role came later that year as Peach in My Dear Loser: Edge of 17 (2017), where she starred alongside Korapat Kirdpan. She later reprised the role in My Dear Loser: Happy Ever After. She also played as Fah in Teenage Mom: The Series, a television adaptation of a popular Thai webtoon, co-starring Perawat Sangpotirat, where she portrayed the challenges of adolescent motherhood.

Her career reached new heights in 2018 with her portrayal of Claire in The Gifted, a science-fiction drama centered on students with extraordinary abilities. Her character, a synesthete who perceives emotions through sound and color, showcased her ability to convey vulnerability and intelligence with subtlety. The series became one of GMMTV's most successful projects of the decade, gaining a strong international following across Asia. She reprised the role in the sequel series The Gifted: Graduation (2020), which further explored her character's evolution and inner conflicts.

In 2019, she appeared in the series Wolf and Love Beyond Frontier, a remake of the 2008 Thai lakorn of the same name. Later that year, she debuted as a member of the girl group Sizzy (formerly SISSY) under GMMTV, alongside Ployshompoo Supasap, Rutricha Phapakithi, and Sarunchana Apisamaimongkol. The group gained popularity for their vibrant pop sound and youthful image, releasing several singles and performing at GMMTV's major fan events until their disbandment in October 2024.

In 2020, she starred as Lin in Angel Beside Me opposite Krissanapoom Pibulsonggram and took on one of her most critically acclaimed roles as Dao in After Dark: The Series. Her haunting performance, a calculated and psychologically layered character, earned widespread praise. Thai critics highlighted her long-take torture scene and commanding physicality, which contributed to her nominations at the 26th Asian Television Awards (Best Actress in a Leading Role) and the 12th Nataraja Awards (Best Leading Actress on an Online Platform).

She continued to explore varied roles in romantic comedy dramas and thrillers, including Wake Up Ladies: Very Complicated (2020), The Player (2021), and Oops! Mr. Superstar Hit on Me (2022). She also appeared in the nostalgic anthology Good Old Days (2022) in the "Bond and Relationship" episode, and in Club Sapan Fine Season 2 (2022).

She returned to prominence in 2023 with her role as White in the suspense-horror series Home School, which received strong reviews for its atmospheric storytelling and strong ensemble cast. Later that year, she starred in Pop Pongkool's music video "พักอิงซบ (Human Error)" opposite Blue Pongtiwat, marking her first major appearance in a music video outside of GMMTV.

In 2024, she starred as Faye in Beauty Newbie, a Thai adaptation of a popular South Korean webtoon My ID is Gangnam Beauty. In October, GMMTV announced both the disbandment of Sizzy and the termination of Janeyeh's exclusive contract. Following her departure from the label, Janeyeh appeared in three back-to-back music videos: DICE's "พูดไม่ฟัง (Comeback No Comeback)" , Zee Pruk's "Super Secret", and PERSES' "อย่าฝืน (Over)".

Her biggest career breakthrough came in 2025 when she starred in Mad Unicorn, a Netflix Thailand original satirical action-comedy inspired by Thailand's first unicorn startup. She portrayed Xiao Yu, a composed and sharp-witted operations strategist working in a rebellious logistics startup that challenges a powerful corporate empire. The series premiered on May 29, 2025, and quickly became a nationwide success, debuting at No. 1 on Netflix Thailand within 24 hours of its release, and later ranking fourth globally among non-English-language television series for two consecutive weeks.

Her performance in the series earned her critical recognition and several industry accolades. She was named as one of the Entertainment Leaders in Lifestyle Asia Thailand’s inaugural 50 ICONS Awards, which honors influential figures in Thai culture and entertainment. She also won the Actress Spotlight of the Year at the FEED x Khaosod Awards, and represented Thailand for the Best Actress in a Leading Role category at the Asian Academy Creative Awards. Her performance was further recognized at the 17th Nataraja Awards, where she won Best Leading Actress, and the 20th Kom Chad Luek Awards, where she received a nomination in the same category.

Later in 2025, she took on her first girls' love (GL) role in Love Design alongside Supassara Thanachat (Kao). In an interview with The Nation Thailand, she revealed that she had long wanted to portray a sapphic character. Her performance earned her the Best Leading Actress award at the Thailand Y Content Awards 2025 and a nomination for Leading Girls' Love Star of the Year at the Y Entertain Awards.

In February 2026, Janeyeh was announced as part of the cast for Girl from Nowhere: The Reset, following the release of the series' official poster by Netflix Thailand. Later that year, she was recognized as one of The 50 Influential People at the Howe Awards 2026.

== Filmography ==
Key
†	Denotes films that have not yet been released

=== Television series ===
Year	Title	Role	Notes	Ref.
2015	Love Sick Season 2	Tai	Supporting role	
2015	The School	Jane	Main role	
2015	Room Alone 2	Ploen	Supporting role	
2016	Part Time	White	Main role	
2016	Lovey Dovey	Kookai (young)	Supporting role	
2016	U-Prince: The Foxy Pilot	Loma	Supporting role	
2017	U-Prince: The Playful Comm-Arts	Loma	Supporting role	
2017	Med in Love	Kanomphing	Main role	
2017	U-Prince:The Extroverted Humanist	Loma	Supporting role	
2017	U-Prince: The Single Lawyer	Loma	Supporting role	
2017	U-Prince: The Crazy Artist	Loma	Supporting role	
2017	U-Prince: The Badly Politics	Loma	Supporting role	
2017	U-Prince: The Ambitious Boss	Loma	Supporting role	
2017	My Dear Loser: Edge of 17	Peach	Main role	
2017	Teenage Mom: The Series	Fah	Main role	
2017	My Dear Loser: Happy Ever After	Peach	Guest role	
2018	The Gifted	Claire	Main role	
2019	Wolf	Ping	Guest role	
2019	Love Beyond Frontier	Ple	Main role	
2020	Angel Beside Me	Lin	Main role	
2020	The Gifted: Graduation	Claire	Main role	
2020	After Dark The Series	Dao	Main role	
2020	Wake Up Ladies: Very Complicated	Lookmai	Main role	
2021	The Player	Eve	Main role	
2022	Oops! Mr. Superstar Hit on Me	Cake	Main role	
2022	Good Old Days: Story 1 – Bond and Relationship	Phu's neighbour	Guest role	
2022	Club Sapan Fine Season 2	May	Main role	
2023	Home School	White	Main role	
2024	Beauty Newbie	Faye	Main role	
2025	Mad Unicorn	Xiaoyu	Main role	
2025	Love Design	Rin	Main role	
2026	Girl from Nowhere: The Reset	Blossom	Guest role (EP.4: OnlyNanno)	

=== Films ===
Year	Title	Role	Ref.
2017	My Subject God (我的學科男神)	Jiang Yue (江悦)	
TBA	Phantom (無形) †	Lin Youmo (林又默)	

=== Television shows ===
Year	Title	Network	Role	Ref.
2017–2019	#TEAMGIRL	GMM 25	Regular Member	
2018	Game of Teens	GMM 25	Ep. 31–32	
2018	School Rangers	GMM 25	Ep. 44–46	
2019	School Rangers	GMM 25	Ep. 63–64	
2019	Beauty & The Babes Season 2	GMM 25	Main Host	
2019	Arm Share	GMMTV	Ep. 27	
2020	School Rangers	GMM 25	Ep. 102–103, 133–134, 147–148	
2020	Come & Join Gun	GMM 25	Ep. 4	
2020	Beauty & The Babes Season 3	GMM 25	Main Host	
2020	Arm Share	GMMTV	Ep. 46	
2020	Share Loma		Ep. 16	
2020	Talk with Toey	GMM 25	Ep. 37, 47	
2021	T-Pop Stage	Workpoint TV	Ep. 2	
2021	School Rangers	GMM 25	Ep. 198–199	
2022	School Rangers	GMM 25	Ep. 224–225	
2022	Arm Share	GMMTV	Ep. 113	
2023	School Rangers	GMM 25	Ep. 277–278	
2024	Pepsi Friend Feast Guide with Gemini-Fourth	GMMTV	Ep. 6	
2025	The Wall Song	Workpoint TV	Ep. 232	
2025	Joker Family	Workpoint TV	Ep. 229	
2025	Love (X)	WeTV	Host	

=== Music videos ===
Year	Title (Romanized)	Title (Thai/Chinese)	Notes
2026	On Repeat	單曲循環	YouTube
2026	Apple Candy		YouTube

=== Music video appearances ===
Year	Title	Artist	Ref.
2023	"พักอิงซบ (Human Error)"	Pongkool Suebsung (Pop Pongkool)	
2024	"พูดไม่ฟัง (Comeback No Comeback)"	DICE	
2024	"Super Secret"	Pruk Panich (Zee)	
2024	"อย่าฝืน (Over)"	PERSES	
2025	"แค่เอาคืน"	Kulamas Sarasas (Knomjean)	
2025	"ไกลกว่าดาว (Million Light-Years)"	FREEHAND	
2025	"กลิ่นฝน (Rain's Memory/雨的记忆)"	Thassapak Hsu (Biexu)	
2025	"นับหนึ่ง (From Now On)"	Putthipong Assaratanakul (Billkin)	
2026	"Yours"	BOYdPOD	
2026	"ขี้แง (Boys Don't Cry)"	Proxie	
2026	"เหงา...เข้าใจ (Lonely)"	4EVE	
2026	"คาราโอเกะ (Karaoke)"	Tattoo Colour	

== Discography ==
=== Singles ===
==== As a lead artist ====
Year	Title	Ref.
2026	"单曲循环 (On Repeat)"	
2026	"Apple Candy"	

==== As a featured artist ====
Year	Title	Artist	Ref
2026	"เมื่อดวงใจมีรัก" (When the Heart Has Love)	F.HERO Ft. JANE YEH x Z9	

=== Soundtrack appearances ===
Year	Title	Label	Ref.
2017	"เลือกที่จะรัก" (Teenage Mom: The Series OST)	GMMTV Records	
2025	"ออกแบบรัก (Love Design)" (Love Design OST) with Kao Supassara		
2025	"Loving You" (Love Design OST)		

== Fanmeetings ==
Year	Date	Title	Venue	Notes	Ref.
2025	September 6	JANE YEH The First Fanmeet in Nanning	HOPELIVE X CONE LIVE HOUSE, Nanning, China		
2025	December 6	Love Design: First Drawing Fan Meeting	Phenix Grand Ballroom	With Love Design cast	
2025	December 28	Love Design: First Fansign in Fuzhou, China		With Supassara Thanachat	
2026	January 23	Love Design Kao & Jane - First Fan Meeting in Taipei	Zepp New Taipei	With Supassara Thanachat	
2026	January 31	KaoJaneJaneKao 1st Fansign in Shanghai		With Supassara Thanachat	
2026	March 14	Love Design with KaoJane - JaneKao 2026 Fan Meeting in Manila	SM North Edsa Skydome	With Supassara Thanachat	
2026	March 28	JaneKao & KaoJane "Dawn of Love" Fan Meeting in Macao	4/F Grand Hall, Macau Tower Convention & Entertainment Centre	With Supassara Thanachat	
2026	April 18	Janeyeh Draw Heartthrob Nanning Fan Meeting			
2026	June 12	Jane Yeh Birthday Tour 2026 in Taipei	Westar, Taipei		
2026	June 13	Jane Yeh Birthday Tour 2026 in Taipei	Westar, Taipei		
2026	June 20	Jane Yeh Birthday Tour 2026 in Bangkok	Union Hall, Union Mall		
2026	June 27	Jane Yeh Birthday Tour 2026 in Guangzhou			
2026	July 18	Jane Yeh Birthday Tour 2026 in Ho Chi Minh City	Army Theater		

== Awards and nominations ==
Year	Award	Category	Work	Result	Ref.
2019	Kazz Awards 2019	Popular Young Woman of The Year		Won	
2020	Kazz Awards 2020	Popular Young Woman of The Year		Nominated	
2020	Kazz Awards 2020	Popular Female Teenage Award		Won	
2020	Zoom Dara Awards 2020	Popular Single	"เปลี่ยนคะแนนเป็นแฟนได้ไหม" (Love Score) by Sizzy x Nanon	Won	
2021	26th Asian Television Awards	Best Actress in a Leading Role	After Dark The Series	Nominated	
2021	12th Nataraja Awards	Best Leading Actress (on Online Platform)	After Dark The Series	Nominated	
2025	FEED x Khaosod Awards 2025	Actress Spotlight of the Year	Mad Unicorn	Won	
2025	Weibo Music Awards 2025	Rising New Artist		Won	
2025	Asian Academy Creative Awards (National Winners) 2025	Best Actress in a Leading Role	Mad Unicorn	Won	
2025	GQ Thailand Men of the Year 2025	Breakthrough Duo of the Year with Supassara Thanachat		Won	
2026	The Viral Hits Awards 2025	Best Leading Actress of the Year	Mad Unicorn	Nominated	
2026	The Viral Hits Awards 2025	Best Yuri Couple of the Year with Supassara Thanachat	Love Design	Nominated	
2026	5th The People Awards 2026	Popular of the Year 2026		Nominated	
2026	Kazz Awards 2026	Couple of the Year with Supassara Thanachat		Nominated	
2026	Kazz Awards 2026	Popular Female Teenage Award		Nominated	
2026	Nine Entertain Awards 2026	Actress of the Year	Mad Unicorn	Nominated	
2026	17th Nataraja Awards	Best Leading Actress (Short Form Series Category)	Mad Unicorn	Won	
2026	Kom Chad Luek Awards 2026	Best Leading Actress in a Television Drama	Mad Unicorn	Nominated	
2026	Thailand Y Content Awards 2025	Best Leading Actress	Love Design	Won	
2026	Y Entertain Awards 2026	Leading Girls' Love Star of the Year	Love Design	Nominated	
