= Thasorn Klinnium =

Thai actress and singer (born 1998)

- ทสร กลิ่นเนียม
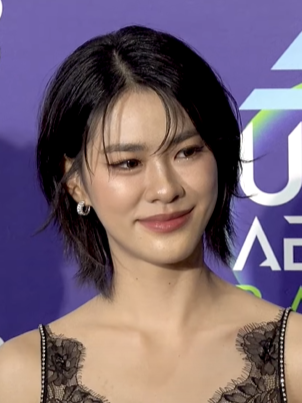
- Thasorn in April 2024
- Born: 25 April 1998 (age 28); Thailand
- Other name: Emi (เอมี่)
- Education: Silpakorn University
- Occupations: Actress; singer; model; host
- Years active: 2020–present
- Agent: GMMTV
- Known for: Nana in Girl from Nowhere 2; Ann in Beauty Newbie; Yeepun in Perfect 10 Liners; Pam in Us
- Height: 165 cm (5 ft 5 in)

Chinese name
- Traditional Chinese: 朱名怡
Transcriptions
Standard Mandarin
- Hanyu Pinyin: Zhū Míngyí
Yue: Cantonese
- Jyutping: zyu^{1} ming^{4} ji^{4}
- IPA: [tsy˥ mɪŋ˩ ji˩]

Thasorn Klinnium (Thai: ทสร กลิ่นเนียม; born 25 April 1998), nicknamed Emi (Thai: เอมี่), is a Thai-Chinese actress, singer, and model. She first gained recognition for her performances in various television series, notably portraying Nana in Girl from Nowhere Season 2 (2021) and Aim-Orn in School Tales The Series (2022).

She signed with GMMTV in 2023, subsequently appearing in Beauty Newbie (2024) and Perfect 10 Liners (2024). She later starred as Pam in the girls' love series Us (2025), for which she won Rising Female of the Year at the Kazz Awards and the Howe Awards in 2025.

== Early life and education ==
Thasorn was born on 25 April 1998 in Thailand to a Thai father and a mother from Guangzhou, China. She is of Thai Chinese descent, and her Chinese name is Zhu Mingyi (Chinese: 朱名怡; pinyin: Zhū Míngyí; Jyutping: zyu1 ming4 ji4).

She completed her secondary education at Nawamintharachinuthid Horwang Nonthaburi School. She later graduated with a Bachelor of Communication Arts from the Faculty of Information and Communication Technology at Silpakorn University.

== Career ==
Thasorn entered the entertainment industry after responding to a Facebook casting call for extras, which led to her appearance in the television series Why R U? (2020).

In 2021, she appeared in the second season of Netflix's Girl from Nowhere as Nana, an antagonist who manipulates and blackmails several girls, including the season's central antagonist, Yuri (Chanya McClory). Later that year, she made her feature film debut as Paew in the horror-mystery film The Whole Truth.

She continued working in television the following year, starring as Aim-Orn, a schoolgirl who mysteriously becomes beautiful overnight, in an episode of the horror anthology series School Tales The Series (2022). She also portrayed Mint in the series 609 Bedtime Story. In August 2022, she made her stage debut starring as Alice in a Thai-language adaptation of Patrick Marber's Closer at the Sodsai Pantoomkomol Centre for Dramatic Arts, Chulalongkorn University.

Following her appearance as Meena in the horror film Hoon Payon (2023) and roles in several television series, Thasorn signed a contract with GMMTV. She made her debut under the agency with a supporting role as Pla in the romantic drama series Last Twilight (2023).

In 2024, she appeared in the television series Intern in My Heart. She followed this with a role in Beauty Newbie as Ann, a tomboyish character who becomes close friends with the male protagonist, Guy, played by Metawin Opas-iamkajorn. Throughout the same year, she also appeared in the series Wandee Goodday, The Rebound, and The Trainee, before concluding the year playing Yeepun in Perfect 10 Liners (2024).

In 2025, she gained wider recognition after starring in the Thai girls' love television series Us (2025), playing a sapphic role alongside Pattraphus Borattasuwan (Bonnie). For her work that year, she received the Rising Female of the Year award at the Kazz Awards and the Howe Awards, while her performance on the series soundtrack, "มากกว่าที่รัก (More Than Words)", won Best Y Series Soundtrack of the Year at the Joox Top Music Night. Her other 2025 television credits included a guest role in Break Up Service, a main role as Phicha in Mouse, and a role as Tulip in Friendshit Forever, followed by a supporting role in Burnout Syndrome.

Expanding into music under Riser Music, she formed the vocal duo EmiBonnie alongside Bonnie. The duo released their debut digital single "Fall For You (ยิ่งชิดยิ่งคิด)" on 24 February 2026. Later in 2026, her television projects included roles in the romantic drama Girl Rules and Peach and Me. That same year, she starred opposite Bonnie in the leading role of Chan in the drama series Moonshadow. In December 2026, she returned to the stage to portray Tang / June in The Love of Siam: The Musical at the Muangthai Rachadalai Theatre.

== Acting credits ==
Key
†	Denotes television productions that have not yet been released

=== Film ===
Year	Title	Role	Ref.
2021	The Whole Truth	Paew	
2023	Hoon Payon	Meena	
2024	Achilles Curse and the Curse of Treasure	San	

=== Television series ===
Year	Title	Role	Network	Notes	Ref.
2020	Why R U?	Bakery customer	Line TV	Guest role	
2020	Wong Waen Tai Samneuk: Phor Chamlaeng	June	Thai PBS	Main role	
2021	Girl from Nowhere 2	Nana	GMM 25	Supporting role	
2022	School Tales The Series	Aim-Orn	Netflix	Main role	
2022	609 Bedtime Story	Mint	WeTV	Supporting role	
2023	Show Me Love	Pageant winner	YouTube	Guest role	
2023	Delete	Tong	Netflix	Guest role	
2023	One Night Stand	Papang's Enemy	One 31	Guest role	
2023	Last Twilight	Pla	GMM 25	Supporting role	
2024	Intern in My Heart	Nana	WeTV	Guest role	
2024	Beauty Newbie	Ann	GMM 25	Supporting role	
2024	Wandee Goodday	Kwan	GMM 25	Supporting role	
2024	The Rebound	Lin	Viu	Supporting role	
2024	The Trainee	Ink	GMM 25	Supporting role	
2024	Perfect 10 Liners	Yeepun	GMM 25	Supporting role	
2025	Us	Pam	GMM 25	Main role	
2025	Break Up Service	Baimon	GMM 25	Guest role	
2025	Mouse	Phicha	TrueID	Main role	
2025	Friendshit Forever	Tulip	GMM 25	Main role	
2025	Burnout Syndrome	Ing	GMM 25	Supporting role	
2026	Girl Rules	Kris	GMM 25	Guest role	
2026	Peach and Me	Mira	GMM 25	Supporting role	
2026	Moonshadow	Chan / Sun	GMM 25	Main role	
TBA	Be Mine: Be My Sugar †	Perth	TBA	Main role	

=== Theater ===
Year	Date	Title	Role	Venue	Notes	Ref.
2022	11–31 August	Closer	Alice	Sodsai Pantoomkomol Centre for Dramatic Arts	Main role	
2026	11–25 December	The Love of Siam: The Musical	Tang / June	Muangthai Rachadalai Theatre	Main role	

=== Music video appearances ===
Year	Title	Artist	Ref.
2019	"เข้าใจได้ (It's OK)"	DoubleBam	
2021	"เรื่องสั้น (Short Story)"	Pakbung	
2022	"จำ (Remember)"	Bomb at Track ft. Pat Zweed n' Roll	
2023	"ฉันเพิ่งจะเข้าใจว่าฉันไม่เคยจะเข้าใจ (Misunderstood)"	Boom Boom Cash	
2023	"ความพยายามอยู่ที่ไหน (Please Try Again)"	Nanon	
2025	"Neon"	Palmy	
2026	"จะรักให้จำ (Your One)"; Moonshadow OST	Bonnie	

== Discography ==
=== Singles ===
==== Collaborations ====
Year	Title	Notes	Ref.
2025	"ฤดูของเรา (Blooming Blossom)" (with Namtan, Film, Milk, Love, Bonnie, June, Mewnich, View, Mim)	Blush Blossom Fan Fest	
2026	"ยิ่งชิดยิ่งคิด (Fall for You)" (with Bonnie Pattraphus)	EmiBonnie	
2026	"Red Kiss" (with Bonnie Pattraphus)	EmiBonnie	
2026	"กุญแจพระจันทร์ (Moonkey)" (with Bonnie Pattraphus)	EmiBonnie	
2026	"ชั่วคราวหรือค้างคืนตลอดไป" (with Bonnie Pattraphus)	EmiBonnie	

==== Soundtrack appearances ====
Year	Title	Notes	Label	Ref.
2023	"จำได้ไหม (Here I Am)"	Faceless Love OST	GMMTV Records	
2024	"มุมมอง (Focus)" (with Gawin Caskey)	Beauty Newbie OST	GMMTV Records	
2025	"มากกว่าที่รัก (More Than Words)"	Us OST	GMMTV Records	
2025	"ไม่อยากจูบเธอในฝัน (Kissin' Out of Dream)" (with Bonnie Pattraphus)	Us OST	GMMTV Records	
2025	"หาย (Hide)" (with Aye Sarunchana)	Hide & Sis OST	GMMTV Records	
2025	"เสียใจไม่ช่วยอะไร (No More Tears)"	Friendshit Forever OST	GMMTV Records	
2026	"Forever Yours"	Girl Rules OST	GMMTV Records	
2026	"Red Kiss" (with Bonnie Pattraphus)	Moonshadow OST	Riser Music	
2026	"เพลงรักที่ยังไม่ลืม (Glitch)"	Moonshadow OST	Riser Music	
2026	"กุญแจพระจันทร์ (Moonkey)" (with Bonnie Pattraphus)	Moonshadow OST	Riser Music	
2026	"ชั่วคราวหรือค้างคืนตลอดไป" (with Bonnie Pattraphus)	Moonshadow OST	Riser Music	

== Fan meetings ==
Title	Date	Venue	Notes	Ref.
Us Final EP. Fan Meeting	5 April 2025	Siam Pavalai Royal Grand Theater, Siam Paragon	With Us cast	
Perfect 10 Liners Bye Nior Fan Party	6 April 2025	MCC Hall, The Mall Lifestore Ngamwongwan, Bangkok	With Perfect 10 Liners cast	
Perfect 10 Liners Bye Nior After Party	7 April 2025	MCC Hall, The Mall Lifestore Ngamwongwan, Bangkok	With Perfect 10 Liners cast	
EmiBonnie 1st Fan Meeting in Taipei	17 May 2025	NCCU Art & Culture Center Auditorium, Taipei	With Bonnie	
GMMTV Fanday 22 in Osaka	19 July 2025	Cool Japan Park Osaka WW Hall, Osaka	With Bonnie	
Emi & Bonnie 1st Fan Meet in Singapore	9 August 2025	GVmax Vivocity, Singapore	With Bonnie	
EmiBonnie 1st Fanmeeting in Hong Kong	27 September 2025	AXA Dreamland, Go Park, Hong Kong	With Bonnie	
GMMTV Fanday 26 in Vietnam	22 November 2025	Ben Thanh Theatre, Ho Chi Minh City	With Bonnie	
EmiBonnie Fan Meeting in Taipei	11 January 2026	Zepp New Taipei, Taipei	With Bonnie	
Burnout Syndrome Final Ep. Fan Meeting	4 February 2026	Siam Pavalai Royal Grand Theater, Siam Paragon	With Burnout Syndrome cast	
EmiBonnie 1st Fan Meeting in Manila	21 February 2026	SM North EDSA Skydome, Manila	With Bonnie	
EmiBonnie 1st Fan Meeting in Seoul	11 April 2026	Kwangwoon University Donghae Culture & Arts Center, Seoul	With Bonnie	
Emi & Any Guangzhou Fan Meeting	18 April 2026	Guangzhou, China	With ANY	
Emi & Bonnie JIB Dream Fanmeet 6.5	23 May 2026	Hilton Rome Airport Hotel, Rome	With Bonnie	
Moonshadow: Under The First Moon	12 August 2026	CentralWorld Pulse Hall, CentralWorld	With Moonshadow cast	
Moonshadow: The Afterglow Fan Party	14 October 2026	Iconsiam Hall, Iconsiam	With Moonshadow cast	
Moonshadow: The Afterglow After Party	15 October 2026	Iconsiam Hall, Iconsiam	With Moonshadow cast	
GMMTV Fan Day 41 in Tokyo	14 February 2027	New Pier Hall, Tokyo	With Bonnie	

== Concerts ==
Title	Date	Venue	Notes	Ref.
Blush Blossom Fan Fest	28–29 June 2025	Union Hall, Union Mall	With Milk, Love, Namtan, Film, Bonnie, View, Mim, June, Mewnich	
Blush Blossom Fan Fest in Macau	30 November 2025	Fisherman’s Wharf Convention & Exhibition Center	With Milk, Love, Namtan, Film, Bonnie, View, Mim, June, Mewnich	
EmiBonnie: Love Session	7–8 March 2026	MCC Hall, The Mall Lifestore Bangkapi, Bangkok	With Bonnie	
Blush Blossom Fan Fest 2026: Midnight Bloom	13–14 June 2026	BITEC Live, Bangkok	With Bonnie, Milk, Love, Namtan, Film, View, Mim, June, Mewnich, Jan, JingJing, Pahn, Fond, Kapook, Ciize	
JuniorMark Sunny Moon Concert	8 August 2026	BITEC Live, Bangkok	With Junior, Mark, Bonnie, Pahn, Fond	
PondPhuwin Space Soul-dyssey Concert	21–23 August 2026	Impact Arena, Muang Thong Thani	With Pond, Phuwin, Bonnie, Est, Perth, Santa	
Gemini Art-Venture Concert	6 September 2026	BITEC Live, Bangkok	With Gemini, Jackie, Fourth	
Blush Blossom Fan Fest 2026: Midnight Bloom in Macau	24 October 2026	Fisherman’s Wharf Convention & Exhibition Center	With Bonnie, Milk, Love, Namtan, Film, View, Mim, Jan, JingJing, Pahn, Fond, Kapook, Ciize	
Blush Blossom Fan Fest 2026: Midnight Bloom in Kaohsiung	7 November 2026	Kaohsiung Music Center	With Bonnie, Milk, Love, Namtan, Film, View, Mim, Jan, JingJing, Pahn, Fond, Kapook, Ciize	
EmiBonnie: Love Session in Singapore	9–10 January 2027	Capitol Theatre	With Bonnie, ANY	
EmiBonnie Concert	24–25 April 2027	Paragon Hall	With Bonnie	

== Awards and nominations ==
Award nominations for Thasorn Klinnium
Year	Award	Category	Nominee(s)	Result	Ref.
2025	Kazz Awards 2025	Rising Female of the Year		Won	
2025	Thailand Y Content Awards 2024	Best Supporting Actress	The Rebound	Nominated	
2025	Feed x Khaosod Awards 2025	Girl's Love Actress of the Year	Us	Nominated	
2025	Joox Top Music Night 2025	Best Y Series Soundtrack of the Year	"มากกว่าที่รัก (More Than Words)"	Won	
2025	Howe Awards 2025	The Best Couple Award	with Pattraphus Borattasuwan	Nominated	
2025	Howe Awards 2025	Shining Female Award		Nominated	
2025	Howe Awards 2025	Rising Icon Award	Us	Won	
2025	30th Asian Television Awards	Best Theme Song	"มากกว่าที่รัก (More Than Words)"	Nominated	
2025	2025 Thailand Headlines Person of the Year	Culture and Entertainment Award		Won	
2026	TOTY Music Awards 2025	Popular Original Soundtrack of the Year	"มากกว่าที่รัก (More Than Words)"	Nominated	
2026	17th Nataraja Awards	Best Supporting Actress	Mouse	Nominated	
2026	Maya Superstar Idol Awards 2026	Best Actress of the Year		Won	
2026	Kazz Awards 2026	Youth Choice of the Year (4th place)		Won	
2026	Feed x Khaosod Awards 2026	Best Chemistry of the Year	with Pattraphus Borattasuwan	Nominated	
2026	31st Asian Television Awards	Best Actress in a Leading Role	Friendshit Forever	Nominated	
