= Mad Unicorn =

- Also known as: Songkhram Song Duan
- Genre: Drama
- Created by: Jira Maligool; Vanridee Pongsittisak
- Written by: Nottapon Boonprakob; Vasudhorn Piyaromna; Thodsapon Thiptinnakorn; T Hantaweewatana; Pattaranad Bhiboonsawade
- Directed by: Nottapon Boonprakob
- Starring: Natara Nopparatayapon; Methika Jiranorraphat; Palang Rocksilp; Thaneth Warakulnukroh; Pachara Chirathivat
- Country of origin: Thailand
- Original language: Thai
- No. of seasons: 1
- No. of episodes: 7

Production
- Executive producers: Jina Osothsilp; Preeyawan Bhuwakul; Boosaba Daorueng; Paiboon Damrongchaitham
- Producers: Somprasong Srikrajang; Suwimon Techasupinan
- Cinematography: Phaklao Jiraungkoonkun
- Editors: Panayu Kunvanlee; Natthaphon Timmuang
- Running time: 55–71 minutes
- Production company: GDH 559

Original release
- Network: Netflix
- Release: May 29, 2025

Mad Unicorn (Thai: สงคราม ส่งด่วน; RTGS: Songkhram Song Duan; lit. 'Express Delivery War') is a 2025 Thai drama television series produced by GDH 559. It premiered worldwide on Netflix on May 29, 2025.

== Plot ==
The series tells the story of Santi, a visionary from humble beginnings who aims to create Thailand’s first unicorn startup. His journey from rags to riches is fueled by ambition, friendship, and the harsh realities of the business world.

== Cast ==
=== Main ===
- Natara Nopparatayapon as Santi
- Methika Jiranorraphat as Xiaoyu
- Palang Rocksilp as Rui Jie
- Thaneth Warakulnukroh as Kanin
- Pachara Chirathivat as Ken

=== Support ===
- Thassapak Hsu as Liam
- Khemupsorn Sirisukha as Mam MALLY
- Sorakon Addunyanon as Business Show Host
- Apichart Promraksa as Dej
- Thongchai Thongkanthom as Online Merchant
- Tanapak Jongjaiphar as Thongchai
- Sira Simmee as Bom
- Anongnart Yusananda as Linux
- Tipargorn Chaiprasit as Army
- Sukhapat Lohwacharin as Nipon
- Feng Yun Zhi as Alice
- Zong Xiao Jun as Zhang
- Ren Luomin as Peter
- Patchamon Park as Santi Mom
- Yuttapong Vitayajaru as Santi Dad
- Wongsatorn Thaowattanarungrot as Young Santi
- Upaiyapat Phithakwawee as Young Thongchai
- Varin Sachdev as Navin
- Aroon Wanasbodeewong as Sand Mine Owner
- Nat Sornkasettarin as Jimmy
- Nantawan Sriputtha as Jae Sri
- Rungmanisana Choychoo as Zhang's Mistress
- Sittichok Pueakpoolpol as EASY Presenter
- Naraphat Ngodngam as Sebastian, the Truck Driver
- Piyaphong Wongkhamlao as Bird, Tech Developer
- Kritsada Boonrit as Nun, Tech Developer
- Chotirat Wareerattanarot as Arm, Tech Developer
- Kiattisak Sudsangsawang as M, Tech Developer
- Chayapatr Archiwaranguprok as Pup, Tech Developer
- Krin Preechachaisurat as Guang, Tech Developer
- Nutnadeach Thammapan as Maitree, Wawee Gang
- Thakool Sreedaw as Prida, Wawee Gang
- Pipatkorn Ketkaew as Tough Sales Agent
- Natnaree Rerkkriangkrai as Female Sales Agent
- Xingchen Liu as Young Xiaoyu
- Jian Wu as Xiaoyu's Father
- Hua Jiang as Xiaoyu's Uncle
- Kuang Sheng Ning as Xiaoyu's Aunt
- Li Yi Heng as Ling Feng
- Peerapol Sukphopech as Sand Mine Worker
- Wichien Phutthiporn as Sand Mine Foreman
- Chaninthorn Pitakwararat as Sand Mine Owner Assistant
- Thanakit Audomboriphan as Bartender
- Chalee Immak as Angry Perfume Seeker
- Anusorn Pinyopojanee as Airport Staff
- Veeravit Charoensupasuitirat as Job interviewee

== Episodes ==
No.	Title	Original release date
1	"A Sparrow and a Rooster" (ถอนขนไก่)	May 29, 2025
2	"Our Empire" (อาณาจักรของเรา)	May 29, 2025
3	"All-in" (หมดหน้าตัก)	May 29, 2025
4	"Thunder Strikes" (อันธพาล)	May 29, 2025
5	"Overload" (ข้ามเส้น)	May 29, 2025
6	"The Last Bullet" (กระสุนนัดสุดท้าย)	May 29, 2025
7	"Next Day" (วันพรุ่งนี้)	May 29, 2025

== Reception ==
Mad Unicorn received positive critical reception for its portrayal of the Thai startup ecosystem and its high production value. Prachachat Business described the show as "a wild ride into the chaos of billion-dollar dreams," highlighting its intense boardroom drama and realistic depiction of entrepreneurial struggles. Similarly, Marketeer Online praised its "high production value and dynamic character development," comparing it to global tech-drama hits.

== Accolades ==
Year	Award	Date of ceremony	Category	Recipient	Result	Ref.
2025	Global OTT Awards 2025	24 August 2025	Best Creative	Mad Unicorn	Nominated	
2025	Global OTT Awards 2025	24 August 2025	Best Director	Nottapon Boonkrapob	Nominated	
2025	Global OTT Awards 2025	24 August 2025	Best Lead Actor (Male)	Natara Nopparatayapon	Nominated	
2025	FEED X Khaosod Awards 2025	13 September 2025	Most Popular Series - Drama of the Year	Mad Unicorn	Nominated	
2025	FEED X Khaosod Awards 2025	13 September 2025	Series - Drama of the Year	Mad Unicorn	Won	
2025	FEED X Khaosod Awards 2025	13 September 2025	Best Director of the Year (Series - Drama)	Nottapon Boonkrapob	Won	
2025	FEED X Khaosod Awards 2025	13 September 2025	Actor of the Year (Series - Drama)	Natara Nopparatayapon	Won	
2025	FEED X Khaosod Awards 2025	13 September 2025	Supporting Actor of the Year (Series - Drama)	Thaneth Warakulnukroh	Won	
2025	FEED X Khaosod Awards 2025	13 September 2025	Actress Spotlight of the Year	Methika Jiranorraphat	Won	
2025	Maya TV Awards 2025	29 October 2025	Outstanding Series of the Year	Mad Unicorn	Won	
2025	Maya TV Awards 2025	29 October 2025	Outstanding Star of the Year	Natara Nopparatayapon	Won	
2025	Howe Awards 2025	12 November 2025	Outstanding Script of the Year	Mad Unicorn	Won	
2025	Howe Awards 2025	12 November 2025	The Best Actor Award	Natara Nopparatayapon	Won	
2025	Asian Academy Creative Awards 2025	4 December 2025	Best Screenplay	Nottapon Boonkrapob, Vasudhorn Piyaromna, Pattaranad Bhiboonsawade	Won	
2025	Asian Academy Creative Awards 2025	4 December 2025	Best Direction (Fiction)	Nottapon Boonkrapob	Nominated	
2025	Asian Academy Creative Awards 2025	4 December 2025	Best Actor in a Leading Role	Natara Nopparatayapon	Nominated	
2025	Asian Academy Creative Awards 2025	4 December 2025	Best Actress in a Leading Role	Methika Jiranorraphat	Nominated	
2025	Asian Academy Creative Awards 2025	4 December 2025	Best Drama Series	Mad Unicorn	Nominated	
2025	GQ Thailand Men of the Year 2025	9 December 2025	Actor of the Year	Natara Nopparatayapon	Won	
2025	GQ Thailand Men of the Year 2025	9 December 2025	Series of the Year	Mad Unicorn	Won	
2025	Thailand Headlines Person of the Year Awards 2025	16 December 2025	The Most Popular Thai Series among Chinese People Award	Mad Unicorn	Won	
2026	The Viral Hits Awards 2025	28 January 2026	Best Leading Actor of the Year	Natara Nopparatayapon	Nominated	
2026	The Viral Hits Awards 2025	28 January 2026	Best Leading Actress of the Year	Methika Jiranorraphat	Nominated	
2026	The Viral Hits Awards 2025	28 January 2026	Best Drama Series of the Year	Mad Unicorn	Nominated	
2026	Nine Entertain Awards 2026	12 March 2026	Drama Series of the Year	Mad Unicorn	Won	
2026	Nine Entertain Awards 2026	12 March 2026	Actress of the Year	Methika Jiranorraphat	Nominated	
2026	Nine Entertain Awards 2026	12 March 2026	Actor of the Year	Natara Nopparatayapon	Won	
2026	Nine Entertain Awards 2026	12 March 2026	Actor of the Year	Thaneth Warakulnukroh	Nominated	
2026	14th Thailand Social Awards	25 February 2026	Best Content Performance on Social Media	Mad Unicorn	Nominated	
2026	17th Nataraja Awards	17 May 2026	Best Drama Award (Short Form Series Category)	Mad Unicorn	Won	
2026	17th Nataraja Awards	17 May 2026	Best Director (Short Form Series Category)	Nottapon Boonkrapob	Won	
2026	17th Nataraja Awards	17 May 2026	Best Leading Actress (Short Form Series Category)	Methika Jiranorraphat	Won	
2026	17th Nataraja Awards	17 May 2026	Best Leading Actor (Short Form Series Category)	Natara Nopparatayapon	Won	
2026	17th Nataraja Awards	17 May 2026	Best Supporting Actor Award (Short Form Series Category)	Dr. Palang Rocksilp	Nominated	
2026	17th Nataraja Awards	17 May 2026	Best Supporting Actor Award (Short Form Series Category)	Thaneth Warakulnukroh	Won	
2026	17th Nataraja Awards	17 May 2026	Best Screenplay (Short Form Series Category)	Nottapon Boonkrapob, Vasudhorn Piyaromna, Thodsapon Thiptinnakorn, Tanida Hantaweewatana, Pattaranad Bhiboonsawade	Won	
2026	17th Nataraja Awards	17 May 2026	Best Editing (Dramatic Feature Category)	Pannayu Kunvanlee, Nuttapon Timmueng	Won	
2026	17th Nataraja Awards	17 May 2026	Best Cinematography (Dramatic Feature Category)	Jaji	Won	
2026	17th Nataraja Awards	17 May 2026	Best Art Direction (Dramatic Feature Category)	Sarawut Kaewnamyen	Won	
2026	Kom Chad Luek Awards 2026	27 May 2026	Best Series Screenplay	Nottapon Boonkrapob, Vasudhorn Piyaromna, Thodsapon Thiptinnakorn, Tanida Hantaweewatana, Pattaranad Bhiboonsawade	Won	
2026	Kom Chad Luek Awards 2026	27 May 2026	Best Series Director	Nottapon Boonkrapob	Won	
2026	Kom Chad Luek Awards 2026	27 May 2026	Best Supporting Actor in a Television Drama	Dr. Palang Rocksilp	Nominated	
2026	Kom Chad Luek Awards 2026	27 May 2026	Best Leading Actress in a Television Drama	Methika Jiranorraphat	Nominated	
2026	Kom Chad Luek Awards 2026	27 May 2026	Best Leading Actor in a Television Drama	Natara Nopparatayapon	Won	
2026	Kom Chad Luek Awards 2026	27 May 2026	Best Drama Series	Mad Unicorn	Won	
2026	22nd Baan Nang Klang Lakorn Awards	31 May 2026	Outstanding Performance by a Supporting Actress	Methika Jiranorraphat	Nominated	
2026	22nd Baan Nang Klang Lakorn Awards	31 May 2026	Outstanding Performance by a Leading Actor	Natara Nopparatayapon	Won	
2026	22nd Baan Nang Klang Lakorn Awards	31 May 2026	Outstanding Direction for Drama or Series	Nottapon Boonkrapob	Nominated	
2026	22nd Baan Nang Klang Lakorn Awards	31 May 2026	Outstanding Drama or Series	Mad Unicorn	Nominated	
