= Beauty Newbie =

2024 Thai television series

- Official series poster
- Thai: หัวใจไม่มีปลอม
- Literally: My heart is not fake
- Genre: Drama; Romance comedy
- Created by: GMMTV; Parbdee Tawesuk
- Based on: My ID Is Gangnam Beauty
- Screenplay by: Aticha Tanthanawigrai; Thitimon Mongkolsawat; Nitchamon Mongkolsawat; Usicha Udomsak
- Story by: Ki Maeng-Gi
- Directed by: Aticha Tanthanawigrai
- Starring: Metawin Opas-iamkajorn; Pimchanok Luevisadpaibul
- Theme music composer: Pittaya Pooldawthong
- Opening theme: "Focus" by Gawin Caskey & Emi Thasorn
- Ending theme: "Blind" by Gawin Caskey
- Country of origin: Thailand
- Original language: Thai
- No. of seasons: 1
- No. of episodes: 14

Production
- Executive producers: Aron Levitz; David Madden; Ryan Benitez; Darapa Chaysanguan; Sataporn Panichraksapong
- Production location: Thailand
- Cinematography: Pramett Chankrasae; Kong Pahurak
- Editor: Krich Towiwat
- Running time: 42 minutes
- Production companies: The One Enterprise; GMMTV; Parbdee Tawesuk; Wattpad Webtoon Studio

Original release
- Network: GMM25
- Release: 19 February – 2 April 2024

Related
- My ID Is Gangnam Beauty (2018, Korean adaptation)

Beauty Newbie (Thai: หัวใจไม่มีปลอม) is a Thailand romantic television drama series starring Pimchanok Luevisadpaibul (Baifern) and Metawin Opas-iamkajorn (Win), based on South Korean webtoon My ID Is Gangnam Beauty (Korean: 내 ID는 강남미인!) by Ki Maeng-gi. This production is a collaboration between GMMTV and Parbdee Tawesuk, with Naver's North American subsidiary Wattpad Webtoon Studio. Mui Aticha Tanthanawigrai, who has previously worked as co-director for F4 Thailand: Boys Over Flowers and screenwriter for Girl from Nowhere, directed all 14 episodes of this series. Scheduled to start production in the summer of 2023, the television series premiered on February 19 and concluded on April 2, 2024.

== Synopsis ==
Liu is a young girl who has been bullied due to her ugly appearance. In an attempt to start fresh at university, she undergoes plastic surgery with the goal of looking like a regular student. However, the surgery turns out to be "too successful", making her incredibly beautiful and drawing unwanted attention when all she wants is to blend in and avoid being bullied. Furthermore, some people begin to mock her for having too many surgical alterations to her face and call her names for having artificial beauty. Guy, the popular campus student who went to the same middle school as Liu and knows what she looked like before her cosmetic surgery, confronts her about it. He reveals that he had never held any contempt for Liu because of her looks in middle school. The two quickly become close as Guy spends most of his time looking out for Liu. However, Liu's lack of self-esteem and fear of being teased cause her to reject his feelings, especially when people in their campus think that someone like Guy should date someone with natural beauty like Fay.

== Cast and characters ==
=== Main ===
- Pimchanok Luevisadpaibul (Baifern) as Liu.

(Webtoon character: Kang Mi-rae)
Liu is a university student who is passionate about everything related to fragrance and studied chemistry to pursue her dream of becoming a perfumer. She struggles to fitting in due to not meeting Thai beauty standards. Due to being bullied as a youngster, Liu initially wanted to lead a normal life and avoid standing out, but this changed when she underwent cosmetic surgery before entering college.

- Metawin Opas-iamkajorn (Win) as Guy.

(Webtoon character: Do Kyung-Seok)
Guy is popular among his peers for his intelligence, wealth, and good-looking appearance. However, his past experiences with his parents have caused him to become guarded and closed off. This made it difficult for others to get close to him, leading people to perceive him as aloof or unapproachable.

- Ramida Jiranorraphat (Jane) as Fay.

(Webtoon character: Hyun Soo-Ah)
Fay is the most popular girl in the chemistry department renowned for her extraordinary natural beauty. Despite being sweet and genuine, she is actually desperate for attention and will go to great lengths to get it, including manipulating her gentle and innocent persona to steal the spotlight from others.

- Sapol Assawamunkong (Great) as Saint.

(Webtoon character: Yeon Woo-Young)
Saint is a teaching assistant in the chemistry department who develops feelings for Liu.

=== Supporting ===
- Sattabut Laedeke (Drake) as Mork
- Thanawin Teeraphosukarn (Louis) as Film
- Thanaboon Kiatniran (Aou) as Jerry
- Thasorn Klinnium (Emi) as Ann
- Phatchatorn Thanawat (Ployphach) as Mimi
- Veravarong Kankranchana (Jobpy) as Paula
- Chinnarat Siriphongchawalit (Mike) as Mac
- Suphakorn Sriphothong (Pod) as Third
- Supha Sangaworawong (Est) as Note
- Pracharapon Thepsukdee (Atom) as Jo
- Sopitnapa Chumpanee (Jeab) as Linda (Guy's mother)
- Amarin Nitibhon (Um) as Kroekphon (Guy's father)
- Krongkwan Nakornthap (Jaoying) as Gale (Guy's sister)

=== Cameos ===
- Rutricha Phapakithi (Ciize) as Milin
- Niti Chaichitathorn (Pompam) as Nam
- Metas Opas-iamkajorn (Mick) as Guy (childhood)
- Nutta Punyathanathamrong (Winwa) as Liu (childhood)
- Yuwadee Ruangchai (Pu) as Sunee (Liu's mother)
- Jumpol Thongtan (Gokhai) as Sompoj (Liu's father)
- Pajaree Nantarat (Pan) as Da
- Yannawee Khuptawetin (Oil) as Faye's mother
- Chayapat Siriposop as Faye's grandmother
- Weeravit Vongrouempibool as Pun
- Kamthorn Lorjitramnuay (Hlung) as Ake
- Wannasiri Srivarathanabul (Kung) as Phen
- Nirodha Ruencharoen (Earth) as Gun
- Chayanee Chaladthanyakij (Meen) as Administrative teacher
- Kamonporn Kosriyarakwong (Beambeam) as Nene

== Soundtrack ==
Song title	Artist	Composer	Notes	Ref.
Focus	Gawin Caskey & Emi Thasorn	Okomo P, GG0NE	Opening theme	
Blind	Gawin Caskey	GG0NE	Ending theme	
White Lie	Aye Sarunchana	Okomo P		

== Production ==
Beauty Newbie is the second adaptation of the webtoon after My ID Is Gangnam Beauty was made into a South Korean drama of the same name starring Im Soo-hyang and Cha Eun-woo in 2018. The Thai adaptation was announced at the GMMTV23 Diversely Yours event on November 22, 2022 at Union Hall Bangkok.

"It's been years since I completed My ID is Gangnam Beauty and it was made into a drama series in Korea. Seeing how it's getting a foreign remake makes me realize that Korean webtoons are highly popular overseas. I was surprised to hear that a luxurious production team and famous actors will participate in the drama, and I am looking forward to what kind of wonderful drama will come out." author Gi Maeng-gi said in a statement. The original webtoon was published in eight different languages, including Thai, and earned more than 1.4 billion views.

The director of the series, Mui Aticha Tanthanawigrai, mentioned in her tweets that the new version will be based on the original webcomic. It will be set in the modern era and showcase women's determination to be happy with who they are, not what society thinks they should be. The other characters support the protagonist shine in her own way, not just in terms of physical attractiveness. Beauty Newbie also discusses other societal values that are often imposed on women, such as being a good wife and mother. However, in reality, women have the right to determine their own roles and identities. This is the message that the director hopes to convey through this new version of Beauty Newbie.

On March 27, 2023, Naver Webtoon announced that My ID is Gangnam Beauty! will be adapted into a 14-episode drama titled Beauty Newbie and broadcast in Thailand early next year. The production will be a collaboration between GMMTV, a prominent Thailand production company, and Naver's North American subsidiary Wattpad Webtoon Studio, which will serve as a producing partner.

Variety has reported that production of the show began in summer 2023. Aron Levitz, David Madden and Dexter Ong are executive produce for Wattpad Webtoon Studios, which is the entertainment and publishing arm of story-sharing platforms Wattpad and Webtoon. Sataporn Panichraksapong and Darapa Choeysanguan are executive producers for GMMTV.

Due to unavoidable scheduling conflicts, the actress Fah Yongwaree Anilbol, originally cast to play the character Fay, has undergone a recasting process. As a result, Jane Ramida Jiranorraphat has been selected as her replacement for the role.

Following a period of pre-production, filming for the TV series officially commenced on August 18, 2023 and concluded on January 29, 2024.
