= Love Design =

2025 Thai television series

- Thai: รับ(รัก)ออกแบบ
- Genre: Romance; Drama; Comedy; Girls' Love
- Screenplay by: Naphat Chitweerapat, Lalil Kittitanaphan, Nichapat Buranadilok
- Story by: Sirirat Saetoen
- Directed by: Fuse Kittisak Cheewasatjasakun
- Starring: Supassara Thanachat; Methika Jiranorraphat
- Country of origin: Thailand
- Original language: Thai
- No. of episodes: 8

Production
- Executive producer: Keetawat Chinnakote
- Producer: Thanadol Nualsuth
- Production locations: Thailand, Japan (Kitakyushu)
- Production company: VelCurve Studio

Original release
- Network: Channel 3 HD
- Release: 2 October – 20 November 2025

Love Design (Thai: รับ(รัก)ออกแบบ; RTGS: Rap (Rak) Okbaep, lit. 'Accept (love) design') is a 2025 Thai girls' love (GL) romantic comedy drama television series produced by VelCurve Studio. Directed by Fuse Kittisak Cheewasatjasakun, the series stars Supassara Thanachat (Kao) and Methika Jiranorraphat (Jane). It premiered on 2 October 2025 on Channel 3 in Thailand, with an uncut streaming version available on WeTV.

== Synopsis ==
The story follows Aokbab, a talented architect who returns to Thailand from Japan to save her family’s struggling construction company. To revive the firm, she seeks to recruit Rin, a nationally acclaimed independent architect who has always rejected working under established organizations. Rin initially refuses, but Aokbab’s determination persuades her to join the team.

As the two women clash over design philosophies and personal values, their rivalry gradually turns into an unexpected bond. The reappearance of Mind, Aokbab's first love from a decade earlier, further complicates their journey, introducing both professional rivalry and emotional conflict.

== Cast ==
=== Main ===
- Supassara Thanachat (Kao) as Aokbab

A 30-year-old CEO of Jinta Architect, Aokbab lives her life with precision and purpose, keeping every detail of her world meticulously organized. Ambitious, determined, and highly skilled, she never backs down from challenges. Yet beneath her confident and composed exterior lies a past scarred by heartbreak and unfulfilled dreams.

- Methika Jiranorraphat (Jane) as Rin

A 24-year-old architect who has won numerous design competitions and built an impressive portfolio since her university days, earning her the nickname “Professor Rin.” She is known for her distinct, eccentric style: unconventional fashion, original ideas, and an unrestrained personality. Despite her genius-level talent that many top firms desire, Rin values freedom above all and refuses to work a conventional office job.

=== Supporting ===
- Matira Tantiprasut (Yam) as Mind

A 35-year-old architect, former architecture tutor, and Aokbab’s first love. As a key partner at Mind Space, one of Thailand’s leading architectural firms, she is brilliant, confident, and relentlessly ambitious. Mind’s single-minded pursuit of success once caused deep, lasting pain to Aokbab, creating emotional scars that have yet to heal. Now a professional rival, she continues to challenge Aokbab both personally and professionally, complicating their intertwined pasts and present ambitions.

- Paramee Luengnaruemitchai (Palm) as Tertis

A 24-year-old secretary at Jinta Architect and a close friend of Rin. Tertis is cheerful, gentle, and endearingly clumsy, bringing a sense of warmth and lightness to the team. Attentive to the small details of her colleagues’ preferences and needs, she quietly cares for everyone around her. Behind this cheerful demeanor, however, she harbors a secret: a hidden romantic relationship with Vee, Mind’s right-hand at the rival firm, Mind Space.

- Torfan Taweema (Friend) as Vee

Mind’s trusted right-hand at Mind Space, a composed and mature professional who excels at managing challenges and solving problems for the company. However, when it comes to her personal life, she faces a far more complicated situation: she is secretly in a romantic relationship with Tertis, the secretary of Jinta Architect, Mind Space’s fiercest rival.

- Ratchapong Anomakiti (Poppy) as Chan

The only interior architect at Jinta Architect and Aokbab’s second older brother, Chan is a free-spirited and nature-loving professional. He is easygoing in daily life, providing a calming presence for his colleagues, yet meticulous and uncompromising when it comes to design work.

- Sarut Nawapraditkul (Mil) as Pat

The eldest of the three siblings and a respected architecture professor, Pat is calm, principled, and a natural leader. Admired by both his siblings and subordinates, he is honest, fair, and deeply committed to the ethical practice of architecture. Despite his demanding teaching responsibilities, he entrusts Aokbab with managing the family firm while upholding his professional ideals.

- Elisha Ruengruengsiri (Hymn) as Thee

A partner at Mind Space Company and a skilled architect with strong business acumen. Intelligent and ambitious, Thee is willing to push boundaries to elevate his firm. Once close friends with Pat and Chan, a falling-out turned him into a bitter rival, driving his determination to see Jinta Architect fail.

- Nalinthip Phoemphattharasakun (Fon) as Prim

Rin’s older sister and owner of the coffee shop KOFFEE CLUB. Prim is warm, gentle, and deeply nurturing. She is passionate about her craft as a barista and devoted to providing a safe haven for Rin. Though often flirted with by customers, she remains focused on her café and the well-being of her sister, serving as both emotional anchor and refuge for Rin in times of need.

- Yarnnawut Jarnyahan as Jade
- Nithiwat Kitjarungruang as Yong
- Pemika Ratsameechawalit as May

=== Cameo ===
- Ninnart Sinchai as Palat
- Nopparat Rattanawaraha as Rain
- Somrutai Rattanawaraha as Mink
- Il Hong Min as Blue

=== Japanese Cast ===
- So Takei
- Mikiyo Nakajima
- Appare Koizumi
- Takuya

== Soundtrack ==
No.	Title	Artist	Ref.
1	Our Little Thing	Paramee Luengnaruemitchai	
2	"ออกแบบรัก" (Love Design)	Supassara Thanachat, Methika Jiranorraphat	
3	"ช่วยทำให้มันจบ" (Let It End)	Supassara Thanachat	
4	Loving You	Methika Jiranorraphat	

== Production ==
VelCurve Studio announced Love Design as a GL romantic-comedy project in early 2025, positioning it as a high-production series that blends workplace drama in architecture and design with a romantic storyline between two female leads. The creative team and producers teased the project with early posters and a pilot that framed the series as both a competitive design drama and an emotionally-driven romance.

Filming began on 27 April 2025 and continued for approximately four months. Production included both domestic shoots in Thailand and a large international unit shoot in Kitakyushu, Japan. Thai outlets reported that the Kitakyushu film unit, with over 40 people, was warmly welcomed by the local officials, including the city's mayor, during the location shoot. Japanese actor Takei So also participated in the overseas shoot. The Japanese location work were prominently featured in promotional clips and behind-the-scenes footage, highlighting contrasting architectural styles and scenic backdrops. Production was announced to have concluded in August 2025.

Alongside production, VelCurve Studio launched an extensive promotional campaign across social media and YouTube. This included official teasers, two pilot releases, a full trailer, character introduction clips, and behind-the-scenes content compiled into a dedicated playlist. Several YouTube videos featured English subtitles, enhancing accessibility for international audiences. The series’ Instagram and X (Twitter) accounts regularly shared set photos, premiere announcements, and updates, while Thai entertainment outlets republished trailers and covered the Japan shoot, further boosting visibility before release.

The series’ promotional rollout began with the first pilot on 28 March 2025, followed by the second pilot on 24 May. The first official soundtrack, Our Little Thing, was released on 28 June across all streaming platforms. The official teaser debuted on 29 August, with the full trailer following on 16 September. The official poster and broadcast schedule were shared via the series’ Twitter account on 11 September. The second soundtrack, ออกแบบรัก (Love Design), was released on all streaming platforms on 1 October coinciding with the series premiere.

== Book Adaptation ==
On 31 August 2025, it was announced that the series’ script had been adapted into a book of the same title by THEK34, available in both Thai and English.

== Release ==
The production announced a Channel 3 broadcast slot (Thursday evenings, 22:30 local time) and an uncut streaming version on WeTV to be available concurrently. The official premiere date was given as 2 October 2025 in studio posts and media announcements. Episode scheduling and subsequent episode guides were published through the series’ social accounts and TV listings. On 26 December, the series’ official X account announced that Love Design would be available for streaming on Netflix.

== Episodes ==
No.	Title	Original release date
1	"Episode 1: Destiny"	2 October 2025
Aokbab returns from Japan to rescue her family’s struggling firm, Jinta Architect, and meets the talented but eccentric architect Rin. Their first encounter sparks conflict, which escalates during a “drinking duel” that leaves them in an embarrassing situation. At the same time, Mind, Aokbab’s first love, and her firm Mind Space move to secure the same project.
2	"Episode 2: Mind The Gap"	9 October 2025
After a confusing night at a Japanese bar, the relationship between Aokbab and Rin becomes even more awkward. Rin discovers that Aokbab’s architectural design connects to a painting she had fallen in love with three years ago in Kitakyushu. She begins to wonder if Aokbab might be “the person she once fell for through a painting.” The tension rises when the pair cross paths with Mind from Mind Space, intensifying the competition.
3	"Episode 3: Home Sweet Home"	16 October 2025
The Jinta Architect team is back on track as they prepare to pitch the “Rain’s House” project, a major opportunity for the company. Rin proposes spending a week living in the house to better understand the space, so Aokbab takes her on-site, and they end up staying overnight together. Their differences gradually reveal a growing closeness beyond mere colleagues, until the truth comes out: Rin was the one who picked up Aokbab’s lost sketchbook in Kitakyushu three years ago.
4	"Episode 4: Kitakyushu"	23 October 2025
Aokbab and Rin travel to Kitakyushu, retracing the footsteps of Rain and Mink, where they uncover a connection from the past and begin to learn that designing with the heart means opening up to feelings as a guide. Meanwhile, Mind Space pushes forward with the Rain House project, forcing Vee and Tetris to keep their secret relationship under pressure and built on lies.
5	"Episode 5: Secret"	30 October 2025
Aokbab and Rin are in Kitakyushu, where they gradually open up to each other and share a romantic final night. Back in Thailand, Aokbab begins to change her perspective, putting her heart into her work and paying more attention to her feelings, which her two brothers soon notice. Yet Rin still seeks clarity from Aokbab, while Mind, her first love, tries every way to stand in the way of their relationship.
6	"Episode 6: Pitching"	6 November 2025
Aokbab and Rin’s relationship grows closer as they open up and share sweet moments, with Rin chosen to present the project and encouraged by Aokbab. On Pitching day, Team Jinta is shocked when Mind Space presents a concept almost identical to theirs, leaving Aokbab furious and confronting Mind, though without proof. In the end, Jinta revises the design just in time and presents a concept tied to Ren and Mink’s memories, filling the team with pride while cracks begin to form within Mind Space.
7	"Episode 7: Again"	13 November 2025
8	"Episode 8: Final Draft"	20 November 2025
Jinta Architect joins the pitching round against Mind Space with the concept “Everything Possible,” earning applause from the judges. At the same time, Wee and Tertis begin to plan their future more clearly now that everyone already knows about their relationship from the previous episode.

== Reception ==
Prior to its release, Love Design generated considerable anticipation among GL audiences in Thailand and abroad. Media coverage highlighted the series’ unique positioning as a mainstream GL drama on free-to-air television, the pairing of popular actresses Kao and Jane, high production values, and overseas filming locations in Japan. Following its release, the series received positive international attention, ranking third among non-Chinese television series with strong word-of-mouth popularity on Douban, a major Chinese social networking and review platform for film and television, where it achieved a user rating of 9.5 out of 10 under its Chinese title Designing Love (Chinese: 《设计爱情》).

== Awards and nominations ==
Award nominations for Love Design
Year	Award	Category	Nominee(s)	Result	Ref.
2026	The Viral Hits Awards 2025	Best Yuri Series of the Year	Love Design	Nominated	
2026	The Viral Hits Awards 2025	Best Yuri Actress of the Year	Supassara Thanachat	Nominated	
2026	Feed x Khaosod Awards 2026	Girls' Love Actress of the Year	Supassara Thanachat	Nominated	
2026	Feed x Khaosod Awards 2026	Top-Tier GL Series of the Year	Love Design	Nominated	
