= The Player (Thai TV series) =

2021–22 Thai television series

- Official series poster
- Thai: รัก เป็น เล่น ตาย
- Genre: Action; Suspense
- Directed by: Tichakorn Phukhaotong
- Starring: Way-ar Sangngern; Methika Jiranorraphat; Tipnaree Weerawatnodom; Patara Eksangkul; Jirakit Thawornwong; Phatchara Tubthong; Wachirawit Ruangwiwat; Tawan Vihokratana
- Country of origin: Thailand
- Original language: Thai
- No. of seasons: 1
- No. of episodes: 16

Production
- Production company: GMMTV

Original release
- Network: GMM 25
- Release: 20 December 2021 – 8 February 2022

The Player (Thai: รัก เป็น เล่น ตาย) is a Thai action suspense drama television series, starring Way-ar Sangngern (Joss), Methika Jiranorraphat (Jane), Tipnaree Weerawatnodom (Namtan), Patara Eksangkul (Foei), Jirakit Thawornwong (Mek), Phatchara Tubthong (Kapook), Wachirawit Ruangwiwat (Chimon) and Tawan Vihokratana (Tay). The show follows a group of high-society people who engage in a devious game in order to bet for their popularity, fortune, and love, which ends to a suspected murder. The rich's life is not quite as idyllic as it appears. In such a short period, it might turn quite dark. What happens when one of them begins a game of life that escalates to a murder and discloses those dark secrets?

Directed by Tichakorn Phukhaotong (Jojo) and it was one of the sixteen television series produced by the GMMTV under "GMMTV 2021: The New Decade Begins" event on 3 December 2020, it is distributed by streaming app Viu, it started to air on 20 December 2021 and continues every Monday and Tuesdays at 20:30 (8:30 pm) on GMM25, replacing Irresistable on its timeslot, and on the above-mentioned international streaming platform at 22:30 (10:30 pm). The official trailer was released by the GMMTV on 7 December 2021, with the official characters and casts also being revealed.

== Plot ==
The Player starts off with the climax of Miriam having an altercation with multiple members of a high society group at a party - namely Matt, Pitch, Giwi, Eve and Tim. Following Miriam's disappearance after the party, inspector Tin investigates the different high society members and uncovers not just their dark secrets, but also the truth behind a seemingly unrelated murder case.

== Casts and characters ==
=== Main ===
- Way-ar Sangngern (Joss) as Theerapat Theerachaichan (Tim)
- Methika Jiranorraphat (Jane) as Eve
- Tipnaree Weerawatnodom (Namtan) as Gewalin Theerachaichan (Giwi)
- Patara Eksangkul (Foei) as Pitch
- Jirakit Thawornwong (Mek) as Matt
- Phatchara Tubthong (Kapook) as Miriam
- Wachirawit Ruangwiwat (Chimon) as Dan
- Tawan Vihokratana (Tay) as Tin

=== Supporting ===
- Nawat Phumphotingam (White)
- Patharawarin Timkul (May)
- Sattabut Laedeke (Drake)
- Sueangsuda Lawanprasert (Namfon)
- Supoj Janjareonborn (Lift)
- Naphon Phromsuwan
- Pattamawan Kaomulkadee (Yui)

== Reception ==
=== Thailand television ratings ===
- In the table below, the blue number represents the lowest ratings and the red number represents the highest ratings.

| Episode No. | Timeslot (UTC+07:00) | Air date | Average audience share | Ref. |
|---|---|---|---|---|
| 1 | Monday and Tuesdays, 8:30 pm | 20 December 2021 | 0.097% | |
| 2 | Monday and Tuesdays, 8:30 pm | 21 December 2021 | 0.093% | |
| 3 | Monday and Tuesdays, 8:30 pm | 27 December 2021 | 0.111% | |
| 4 | Monday and Tuesdays, 8:30 pm | 28 December 2021 | 0.1% | |
| 5 | Monday and Tuesdays, 8:30 pm | 3 January 2022 | 0.2% | |
| 6 | Monday and Tuesdays, 8:30 pm | 4 January 2022 | 0.1% | |
| 7 | Monday and Tuesdays, 8:30 pm | 10 January 2022 | 0.2% | |
| 8 | Monday and Tuesdays, 8:30 pm | 11 January 2022 | 0.2% | |
| 9 | Monday and Tuesdays, 8:30 pm | 17 January 2022 | 0.2% | |
| 10 | Monday and Tuesdays, 8:30 pm | 18 January 2022 | 0.2% | |
| 11 | Monday and Tuesdays, 8:30 pm | 24 January 2022 | 0.139% | |
| 12 | Monday and Tuesdays, 8:30 pm | 25 January 2022 | 0.079% | |
| 13 | Monday and Tuesdays, 8:30 pm | 31 January 2022 | | |
| 14 | Monday and Tuesdays, 8:30 pm | 1 February 2022 | | |
| 15 | Monday and Tuesdays, 8:30 pm | 7 January 2022 | | |
| 16 | Monday and Tuesdays, 8:30 pm | 8 February 2022 | | |
| Average | | | — ^{1} | |

^1 Based on the average audience share per episode.
