= Thaneth Warakulnukroh =

Thai singer, songwriter and actor

- ธเนศ วรากุลนุเคราะห์
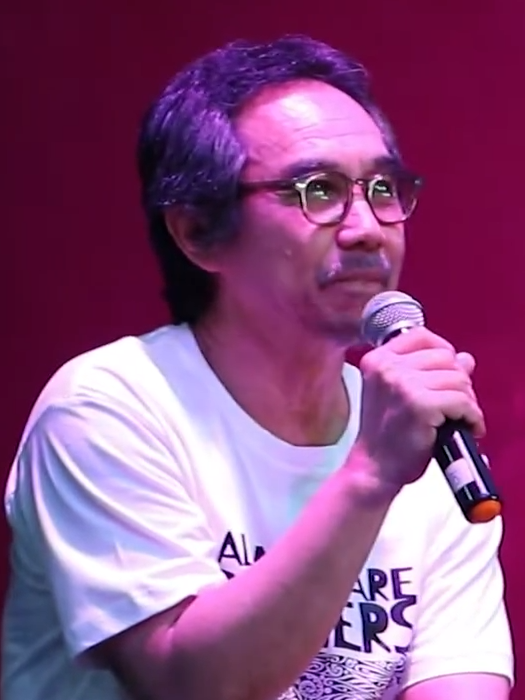
- Thaneth in 2022
- Born: 9 September 1958 (age 67); Samut Songkhram, Thailand
- Other name: Ek (เอก)
- Education: Ramkhamhaeng University
- Occupations: Singer, songwriter, record producer, DJ and actor
- Years active: 1983–present

Thaneth Warakulnukroh (Thai: ธเนศ วรากุลนุเคราะห์; born September 9, 1958) is a veteran Thai singer, songwriter, record producer, DJ, and actor. He was also a founder and owner of Music Bugs Company, a record label through which many Thai bands, including Bodyslam, Big Ass, Labanoon, and Friday, released their first albums.

== Career ==
=== Music ===
Starting in the music industry in 1983 as a DJ for label Nitespot, who recruited him as an artist later that year. His first two albums which were released under Nitespot production are Dan Civilise (Civilized land beyond the horizon) in 1985, and Kon Kien Pleng Bun Leng Chi Wit (A writer of life) in 1987. His first, progressive rock album gained a cult following, but his second, being of a more surrealist tendency, failed to gain wider acceptance.

Kod Pum (Press the button) in 1989 and Rock Kra Tob Mai (Wood strikes rock) in 1992 with record label GMM Grammy marked a more commercialised approach, achieving good reviews from critics and mainstream popularity.

He founded Music Bugs Records in 1996, producing an album with his younger brother, Jirot Warakulnukroh, and later successful albums with Bodyslam, Big Ass, Labanoon, Friday, and other artists. He retired from the record company in 2006 to spend time with his family.

Twenty three years after his last album, he returned to music in 2015 with his 5th studio album Phloe, a concept album of more than 30 songs, released through his new record company Rock Opera House Records.

Thaneth Warakulnukroh introduced the new album with two concerts “Thaneth Warakulnukroh : Phloe the concert" on 23 and 24 October 2015, with a large on stage line-up including Thanachai Ujjin (Modern dog), Artiwara "Toon" Kongmalai (Bodyslam), Big Ass, Labanoon, Stamp-Apiwat, "Two" Popetorn, Tul Waitoolkait (Apartment Khunpa), Image-Suthita (The Voice Thailand), and Eric Tan (Lomosonic).

More recently he wrote a song in memory of the recently deceased King of Thailand, 13 Tula Nueng Toom Tong (“October 13 at 7pm”)

=== Film ===
Warakulnukroh has appeared in around half a dozen films, including Bad Genius, and as the lead actor in Pop aye (2017), for which he received good reviews.

== Selected filmography ==
- Trouble Makers (1986)
- Fallen Angel (1986)
- Bad Genius (2017)
- Pop aye (2017)
- In Family We Trust (2018)
- Homestay (2018)
- Mad Unicorn as Kanin (2025)
- Tharae The Exorcist as Ming (2025)
- Send Help (2026)
