= School Tales The Series =

2022 Thai television series

- Official series poster
- Thai: โรงเรียนผีมีอยู่ว่า…
- Genre: Anthology; Thriller; Mystery; Horror; Fantasy; Teen drama
- Created by: Five Star Company
- Screenplay by: Nuttapong Wongkaveepairoj; Thanadol Nuansut; Phontharis Chotkijsadarsopon; Saniphong Suddhiphan; Putipong Saisikaew; Songsak Mongkolthong
- Starring: Kay Lertsittichai; Nutchapan Paramacharenroj; Panisara Rikulsurakan; Jennis Oprasert; Siwat Jumlongkul; Pitchatorn Santinatornkul; Shinaradee Anupongpichart; Thasorn Klinnium; Patchanan Jiajirachote; Sarika Sathsilpsupa; Pannawit Phattanasiri; Waratthip Kittiphaisan; Thongchai Thongkanthom; Tonhon Tantivejakul; Patchata Janngeon; Nalinthip Phoemphattharasakun; Suppapong Udomkaewkanjana; Wachirawit Ruangwiwat
- Country of origin: Thailand
- Original language: Thai
- No. of seasons: 1
- No. of episodes: 8

Production
- Running time: 45-50 minutes

Original release
- Network: Netflix
- Release: August 10, 2022

School Tales The Series (Thai: โรงเรียนผีมีอยู่ว่า…; RTGS: Rong Rian Phee Mee Yu Wa...; lit. There is a Ghost School that...) is a Thai mystery thriller anthology television series created by Five Star Company. Based on eight popular horror stories, the series follows various events that can happen on the school at night. The series was released globally on Netflix on August 10, 2022.

== Cast and characters ==
=== "7AM" ===
- Kay Lertsittichai as Q
- Nutchapan Paramacharenroj (PePo) as Not
- Panisara Rikulsurakan (Care) as Tan

=== "Vengeful Spell" ===
- Jennis Oprasert as Pleng
- Siwat Jumlongkul (Mark) as Boy
- Pitchatorn Santinatornkul (Noon) as Jinnie

=== "Beautiful" ===
- Shinaradee Anupongpichart (Yaimai) as Dao
- Thasorn Klinnium (Emi) as Aim-Orn

=== "The Book of Corpses" ===
- Patchanan Jiajirachote (Orn) as Saiparn
- Sarika Sathsilpsupa (Fah) as Teacher Narin

=== "Headless Teacher" ===
- Pannawit Phattanasiri (Garto) as Tim
- Waratthip Kittiphaisan (Euro) as Ping
- Thongchai Thongkanthom (Pingpong) as Teacher Waiwan

=== "Lunch" ===
- Tonhon Tantivejakul (Ton) as Kong
- Srida Puapimol as Aunt Jong

=== "Curse" ===
- Patchata Janngeon (Fiat) as Korn
- Nalinthip Phoemphattharasakun (Fon) as the nurse ghost

=== "A Walk in School" ===
- Suppapong Udomkaewkanjana (Saint) as Boyd
- Wachirawit Ruangwiwat (Chimon) as Tum

== Production ==
Produced by Five Star Productions, this drama series cast 14 actors in eight unrelated episodes under six directors. Filming started in late 2021, and the announcement was made during Geeked Week 2022, which took place from June 6 to June 10, 2022. On the first day of the event, three short stories—Lunch, Curse, and A Walk in School—were shown in advance.

== Episodes ==
No.	Title	Directed by	Original release date
1	"7AM"	Thanadol Nuansut	August 10, 2022
A student unwillingly arrives early for class to warn his classmates about the various messages that emerge on the chalkboard every morning. Casts: Kay Lertsittichai (Q); Nutchapan Paramacharenroj (Not); Panisara Rikulsurakan (Tan); Wichai Saefant (Auan); Chanwut Kwanmongkolcharoen (Vaan)
2	"Vengeful Spell"	Putipong Saisikaew	August 10, 2022
After uncovering a box from the school’s attic, a student puts a curse on a rival student out of sheer jealousy. Casts: Jennis Oprasert (Pleng); Siwat Jumlongkul (Boy); Pitchatorn Santinatornkul (Jinnie)
3	"Beautiful"	Songsak Mongkolthong	August 10, 2022
The most popular girl in school meets her match when a fellow student suddenly turns considerably more beautiful overnight. Casts: Shinaradee Anupongpichart (Dao); Thasorn Klinnium (Aim-Orn)
4	"The Book of Corpses"	Nuttapong Wongkaveepairoj; Putipong Saisikaew	August 10, 2022
A transfer student writes down a curse against her bullies in a mysterious book discovered in the school library, causing dire consequences. Casts: Patchanan Jiajirachote (Saiparn); Sarika Sathsilpsupa (Teacher Narin); Nawasorn Yenkam (Kaew); Rutrawee Jeeradechakul (Ploypoom)
5	"Headless Teacher"	Phontharis Chotkijsadarsopon	August 10, 2022
A pair of mischievous students looks into the mysterious death of a teacher by helping to locate her missing head. Casts: Pannawit Phattanasiri (Tim); Waratthip Kittiphaisan (Ping); Thongchai Thongkanthom (Teacher Waiwan)
6	"Lunch"	Songsak Mongkolthong	August 10, 2022
An overeager student stirs trouble when he tries to expose the truth behind the ingredients at a popular school lunch stall. Casts: Tonhon Tantivejakul (Kong); Srida Puapimol (Aunt Jong)
7	"Curse"	Saniphong Suddhiphan	August 10, 2022
Terrifying incidents occur when a smart but cowardly student is forced by his bullies to make a wish to a school nurse ghost. Casts: Patchata Janngeon (Korn); Nalinthip Phoemphattharasakun (nurse ghost); Sirichada Ruamrudeekul (Mint); Chayanond Boonmanawong (Bom); Jinna Pichit-o-pakun (A)
8	"A Walk in School"	Thanadol Nuansut	August 10, 2022
At night, a gutsy student livestreams his investigation of his high school to prove that ghost stories aren’t real. Casts: Suppapong Udomkaewkanjana (Boyd); Wachirawit Ruangwiwat (Tum)

== Copyright infringement issues ==
When the series premiered on August 10, 2022, the viewers noticed a character in the episode "Curse" using the BLHS community logo as the school's emblem on uniforms. This led to the hashtag "#รพขิ๊ก" trending on Thai Twitter. The Fivestarmovies fan page later shared a letter on August 11, 2022, stating that they had gotten in touch with the designer of the uniforms. The staff told the copyright owner that the designer was prepared to accept accountability and work with them to find a solution, which might involve paying royalties.

== Response ==
The show received harsh criticism for its cliched plot, lack of coherence, and excessively similar viewer-attracting strategies. Nonetheless, the series was able to hold its place in the top 10 for four weeks in Thailand and for two weeks in Indonesia, Malaysia, and Vietnam in terms of Netflix views.
