= Palang Rocksilp =

Dr.Palang Rocksilp
- Born: July 18, 1989 (age 37)
- Origin: Thailand
- Occupations: Opera singer, Actor
- Years active: 2007-present

Palang Rocksilp (Thai: ดร.พลัง โลกศิลป์; RTGS: Phalang Loksin, Chinese: 帕朗·嘉克万心) is a Thai actor, educator, comedian and opera singer. He graduated in opera from the Central Conservatory of Music in Beijing. He gained his fame from the television series Mad Unicorn, which was released in May 2025.

== Early life ==
Palang Rocksilp was born in Bangkok, Thailand. In 2001, he relocated to Beijing. He attended a high school affiliated with the China Conservatory of Music. He was admitted in the Department of Vocal Opera, Central Conservatory of Music. His cross-cultural upbringing made him fluent in Mandarin and comfortable navigating both Thai and Chinese artistic communities.

== Career ==
Rocksilp began his professional career as a baritone singer, performing in national concerts and appearing in cultural events throughout China. In 2025, he made his Thai acting debut in the Netflix-distributed series Mad Unicorn, portraying "Ruijie", a socially reserved programmer with technological skills.

Rocksilp has been active in music education and vocal coaching. He has appeared as a special guest at Pchu's Beijing concert and served as a bilingual host for the Mike & Aom.

== Filmography ==
=== Film ===
Year	Title	Role	Notes	Source
2025	The Hero (这位壮士)	Background character	-	
TBA	U	Unannouncement	-	

=== Television ===
Year	Title	Role	Notes	Source
2017	Take me out Thailand	Guest	Season 12 Episode 9	
2023	Kleur Wonder (เกลือวันเด้อ)	Guest	Episode 104	

Year	Title	Role	Notes	Source
2025	Mad Unicorn (สงครามส่งด่วน)	Ruijie	Episode 1-7	
2025	The Social Warrior	Team Master Lydia	Season	

== Bibliography ==
- Palang Graduation Concert Design (2020)
- Doctoral Vocal Performance: The legend of contemporary Chinese operatic art songs (2023)
- A western Singing Techniques from Chinese Operatic Art songs (2024)

== Live performances ==
- Beijing Olympics closing ceremony (2008)
- La Boheme, special adapted production, Chiang Mai (2022)
