= Sizzy =

Thai girl group

SIZZY
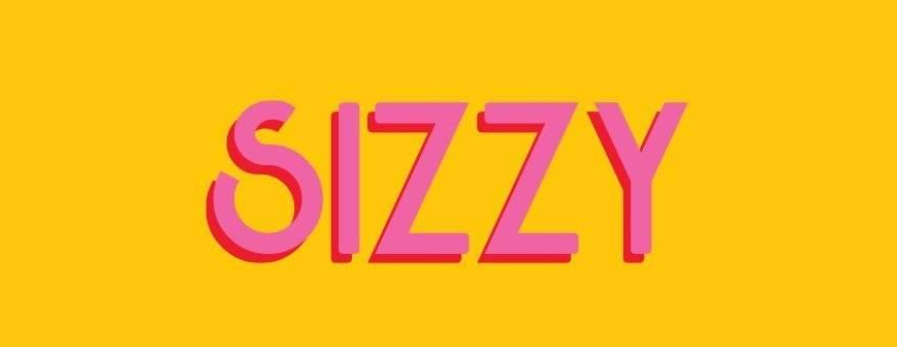

Background information
- Origin: Bangkok, Thailand
- Genres: Thai pop; R&B; hip hop; rap
- Years active: 2019–2024
- Labels: GMMTV Records (2019–23); Riser Music (2023–24)
- Past members: Jan; Jane; Ciize; Aye

Sizzy (sometimes stylized as SIZZY, formerly known as SISSY) was a Thai girl group formed in 2019. It was composed of four female artists, namely Ployshompoo Supasap (Jan), Methika Jiranorraphat (Jane), Rutricha Phapakithi (Ciize), and Sarunchana Apisamaimongkol (Aye).

The official name of SIZZY's fan club is FIZZY, as announced in their Christmas Instagram post on 25 December 2021.

The group officially disbanded on 16 October 2024.

== History ==
GMMTV first teased the formation of a new girl group on 28 October 2019. Originally named as SISSY, GMMTV tapped four of its female artists to form part of its new girl group. Methika Jiranorraphat (Jane) played lead roles in Teenage Mom: The Series, The Gifted and Love Beyond Frontier while Ployshompoo Supasap (Jan) had supporting roles for SOTUS S and Happy Birthday. On the other hand, Sarunchana Apisamaimongkol (Aye) is known for her main role in Friend Zone. Completing the group is Rutricha Phapakithi (Ciize) who was part of YOUniverse.

The group officially debuted on 5 November 2019 with the release of the first single, "ชักช้า(เอิงเอย)" (Loading Love).

Several months since the group launched its first single, GMMTV teased a new single for the group, and the first under the name SIZZY. On 5 August 2020, their second single "เปลี่ยนคะแนนเป็นแฟนได้ไหม" (Love Score) was released featuring fellow GMMTV artist Korapat Kirdpan (Nanon).

On 29 June 2021, SIZZY released "ห้ามใจ" (Unstoppable) as their third single and the opening soundtrack for the TV show 46 Days.

Almost a year after their third single, SIZZY released their fourth single titled "พิสูจน์" (PROVE IT) on 3 June 2022.

Few months later, their fifth single "รับผิดชอบใจฉันด้วย" (LOVE RESPONSE) was released featuring fellow GMMTV artists Pirapat Watthanasetsiri (Earth) and Sahaphap Wongratch (Mix) on 4 October 2022.

On 19 December 2023, SIZZY collaborated with fellow GMMTV and Riser Music group LYKN for a theme song of the GMMTV Starlympic 2023, titled HUI LAY HUI.

SIZZY officially disbanded on 16 October 2024, after Methika Jiranorraphat (Jane) left GMMTV upon the expiration of her contract.

== Members ==
- Ployshompoo Supasap (Jan) - leader, lead vocal & lead dancer
- Methika Jiranorraphat (Jane) - visual, vocalist, lead dancer & rapper
- Rutricha Phapakithi (Ciize) - main dancer, vocalist & rapper
- Sarunchana Apisamaimongkol (Aye) - main vocal

== Discography ==
Year	Song title	English Title	Label	Ref.
2019	ชักช้า(เอิงเอย)	Loading Love	GMMTV Records	
2020	เปลี่ยนคะแนนเป็นแฟนได้ไหม together with Nanon	Love Score	GMMTV Records	
2021	ห้ามใจ; OST 46 Days (46 วัน ฉันจะพังงานวิวาห์)	Unstoppable	GMMTV Records	
2022	พิสูจน์	Prove It	GMMTV Records	
2022	รับผิดชอบใจฉันด้วย together with Earth and Mix	Love Response	GMMTV Records	
2023	HUI LAY HUI together with LYKN	—N/a	RISER MUSIC	

== Awards and nominations ==
Year	Nominated work	Category	Award	Result	Ref.
2020	"Love Score" (shared with Korapat Kirdpan)	Popular Single	Zoom Dara Awards	Won	
