= Friendshit Forever =

2025 Thai television series

- Official series poster
- Thai: เพื่อนสนิท พิษสหาย
- Genre: Thriller; Drama
- Written by: Jinatcha Maneesriwong; Apirak Chaipanha
- Directed by: Ekkasit Trakulkasemsuk
- Starring: Chayanit Chansangavej; Thasorn Klinnium; Thitipoom Techaapaikhun; Noppanut Guntachai
- Country of origin: Thailand
- Original language: Thai
- No. of episodes: 8

Production
- Executive producer: Sataporn Panichraksapong
- Running time: 50 minutes
- Production companies: GMMTV; Keng Kwang Kang Waisai

Original release
- Network: GMM25; TrueVisions NOW
- Release: 4 November – 23 December 2025

Friendshit Forever (Thai: เพื่อนสนิท พิษสหาย; Phuean Sanit Phit Sahai, lit. Close Friend, Poisonous Companion) is a 2025 Thai television series starring Chayanit Chansangavej (Pat), Thasorn Klinnium (Emi), Thitipoom Techaapaikhun (New) and Noppanut Guntachai (Boun). Directed by Ekkasit Trakulkasemsuk and produced by GMMTV together with Keng Kwang Kang Waisai, it was announced as one of the television series of GMMTV for 2024 during their "GMMTV2024: UP&ABOVE Part 2" event on April 23, 2024. The series aired on GMM25 and TrueVisions NOW from November 4, 2025, to December 23, 2025.

== Synopsis ==
Shortly after meeting Tulip (Emi Thasorn), Baikhaw (Pat Chayanit) tells her, "You're like my sister. You're my best friend," just before their worlds are forever changed.

The story follows two best friends whose beautiful friendship is actually tainted with jealousy. Baikhaw receives help from Tao (New Thitipoom), a high school friend who has secretly liked her for a long time and is willing to do anything for Baikhaw. On Tulip's side, she has Namo (Boun Noppanut), a male friend from her faculty, who is always by her side to protect her. Namo must help Tulip escaping Baikhaw's evil schemes, but the revenge won't be easy and may turn into a tragedy since sometimes the most dangerous enemy... is your own best friend.

== Cast and characters ==
=== Main ===
- Chayanit Chansangavej (Pat) as Baikhaw
- Thasorn Klinnium (Emi) as Tulip
- Thitipoom Techaapaikhun (New) as Tao
- Noppanut Guntachai (Boun) as Namo

=== Supporting ===
- Juthapich Indrajundra (Jamie) as Wawwa (Tulip's friend)
- Kirati Puangmalee (Title) as Q (Wawwa's senior)
- Namfon Pakdee (Fon) as Tulip's mother

== Awards and nominations ==
Award nominations for Enigma Black Stage
Year	Award	Category	Nominee(s)	Result	Ref.
2026	31st Asian Television Awards	Best Actress in a Leading Role	Thasorn Klinnium	Pending	
