= Faceless Love =

2023 Thai television series

- Official series poster
- Thai: รักไม่รู้หน้า
- Genre: Romantic comedy
- Based on: Rich Man, Poor Woman by Naoko Adachi, Masami Nishiura, Ryo Tanaka
- Directed by: Ekkasit Trakulkesomsuk; Pantip Vibultham
- Starring: Jirawat Sutivanichsak; Supassara Thanachat; Luke Ishikawa Plowden
- Country of origin: Thailand
- Original language: Thai
- No. of episodes: 14

Production
- Executive producer: Sataporn Panichraksapong
- Running time: 60 minutes
- Production companies: GMMTV; Keng Kwang Kang Waisai

Original release
- Network: GMM25; Amazon Prime Video
- Release: November 8 – December 21, 2023

Faceless Love (Thai: รักไม่รู้หน้า; RTGS: Rak Mai Ru Na) is a 2023 Thai romantic comedy drama produced by GMMTV and Keng Kwang Kang Waisai. Directed by Ekkasit Trakulkasemsuk (Koo) and Pantip Vibultham, this series is an official adaptation of the 2012 Japanese drama Rich Man, Poor Woman.

It is one of the nineteen series project announced by GMMTV at the "GMMTV 2023: Diversely Yours" conference on November 22, 2022. This series aired on GMM25 and Amazon Prime Video on Wednesdays and Thursdays from November 8 to December 21, 2023. Vietnam's VieON broadcast this series every Wednesday and Thursday, simultaneously with Thailand, starting from November 8, 2023.

== Synopsis ==
Veekij (Jirawat Sutivanichsak) is a wealthy, brilliant CEO who suffers from prosopagnosia—face blindness—which prevents him from recognizing faces of people, including those close to him. To navigate his personal and professional life, he hires Mirin (Supassara Thanachat), a resourceful assistant who gradually becomes essential to him, offering a unique connection he cannot ignore.

== Cast and characters ==
=== Main ===
- Jirawat Sutivanichsak (Dew) as Veekij
- Supassara Thanachat (Kao) as Mirin
- Luke Ishikawa Plowden as Chanon

=== Supporting ===
- Phatchatorn Thanawat (Ployphach) as Ewes (Chanon's assistant)
- Wanwimol Jaenasavamethee (June) as Thanya (Chanon's business partner)
- Phanuroj Chalermkijporntavee (Pepper) as Manit
- Chayakorn Jutamas (JJ) as Maew Kwak
- Sarocha Watittapan (Tao) as Soiphet (Chanon's mother)
- Thanaporn Wagprayoon (Parn) as Supranee (Mirin's mother)
- Kevlin Kotland (Aon) as Neeraumphan (Veekij's mother)
- Narinthorn Na Bangchang (Aey) as Noi (Supranee's friend)

=== Guest ===
- Kunpong Kultanaruangnonth (Gung) as Seen (Doctor) (Ep. 10)
- Neen Suwanamas as young Soiphet (Ep. 14)

== Soundtrack ==
The official soundtrack of Faceless Love features original Thai pop songs performed by cast members and professional artists.

No.	Title	Artist	Length
1	"Here I Am" (จำได้ไหม)	Emi Thasorn	3:45
2	"คนที่ไม่เคยอยู่ในสายตา" (The One You Never Noticed)	Atom Chanakan	4:02
3	"Face to Face"	Dew Jirawat	3:33
4	"แค่เพียง" (Just Only)	Kao Supassara feat. Mind U	3:58
5	Instrumental Themes	Various Artists	2:10

== Production ==
According to an announcement at the GMMTV 2023 Diversely Yours press conference, the role of Chanon was originally going to be played by actor Pachara Chirathivat (Peach). However, GMMTV announced on June 14, 2023 that due to the actor's busy schedule, the role would be played by Luke Ishikawa Plowden.
