= The Whole Truth (2021 film) =

Film by Wisit Sasanatieng

- Release poster
- Thai: ปริศนารูหลอน
- Directed by: Wisit Sasanatieng
- Written by: Abishek J. Bajaj
- Produced by: Sangar Chatchairungruang
- Starring: Sompob Benjathikul; Sadanont Durongkaweroj; Steven Isarapong
- Cinematography: Natdanai Naksuwarn
- Edited by: Nisarat Meechok; Harin Paesongthai
- Music by: Rittee Joel Srichanwongse
- Production company: Transformation Films
- Distributed by: Netflix
- Release date: 2 December 2021
- Running time: 125 minutes
- Country: Thailand
- Language: Thai

The Whole Truth (Thai: ปริศนารูหลอน, lit. 'Haunted Hole Puzzle') is a 2021 Thai supernatural mystery horror film directed by Wisit Sasanatieng, written by Abishek J. Bajaj and starring Sompob Benjathikul, Sadanont Durongkaweroj and Steven Isarapong. It was released on Netflix on 2 December 2021.

== Plot ==
Pim and Putt are teenage siblings. Pim is a popular cheerleader while Putt is a bit of a social outcast with a leg brace for unknown reasons. Their mother, Mai, is a working single mom, recently promoted to a higher paid job. One day, Pim comes home from school to find Putt and his friend Fame playing video games. Fame follows her upstairs and tries to force his way into her room while she's changing. Putt is unable to climb the stairs to help her due to his injured leg. A spurned Fame reminds Putt that he possessed a mysterious video, apparently enough to blackmail Putt into doing what he wants. Pim calls her mother to ask when she'll be home and tell her about Fame, but Mai informs her she has to stay late for a meeting. It starts to rain heavily, and on Mai's drive she gets into a car accident. Back at home, Pim answers the door to a man who says he's her grandfather, Phong, and informs her about her mother's accident. At the hospital they see their mother in a coma in the ICU, and meet their grandmother, Wan, who, after mistakenly calling Putt "Krit", insists the teens stay at their house in their mother's old room. She asserts that Pim and Putt lived there as children, though neither remember their time there.

Their grandfather informs them that their grandmother has dementia and might behave strangely he asks they help look after her during their stay and not to take anything upsetting she does to heart. After retrieving their cat Latte from home, Putt discovers a hole in their grandparent's wall. Peering through, he sees a house similar to their grandparents but decaying, along with a dark haired figure. He tells Pim, who dismisses it. At dinner, Pim asks where Latte is and Wan tells her she let the cat outside, which greatly upsets Putt. Pim tells her grandfather about the hole, but when she goes to show him, he cannot see it, nor can Wan. They assume the children are lying, and get irate, particularly Phong who storms off. Wan looks at a blank spot on the wall where a clock used to be and informs Pim and Putt it's time for bed. In their room, Pim and Putt discuss whether their grandparents are lying to them or if the house itself is causing it. Putt asks Pim if she really believes their grandparents are who they say they are, since their mother never mentioned them.

The next morning Pim notices the catfood is still untouched. Putt notices that the hole in the wall is gone. Wan asks them both to try not to upset their grandfather, and lectures Putt about drinking his milk. At school, Fame confronts Putt with the video once again, and invites himself over, despite Putt's protests. Pim sees the confrontation and tells Fame off, even as he tries to flirt with her. Back at their grandparents house, Fames threats of showing Pim the video are interrupted by Putt hearing a scraping noise coming from the hole, which has reappeared on the wall. Fame can neither hear the noise nor see the hole. Putt looks through it and sees a young child with a black, hugely swollen face, with dark liquid dripping from their mouth and nose. Fame attempts to look through the hole and gets a bloody nose, accusing Putt of pushing him and almost coming to blows before Pim gets home and breaks it up. Fame storms off and leaves his phone behind. Pim demands to know what Fame meant, and Putt reveals that he'd secretly filmed Pim taking a shower in the gym and had been blackmailing him to helping Fame get a date with Pim. Wan returns home and sees the blood on the floor, panicking and calling Pim "Mai" and telling her to get rid of it, before calling Putt "Krit" and blaming him for the mess and telling Pim to get him out. She then seems to snap out of it and apologizes, staring at the same place on the wall where a clock used to be and announcing she needs her medicine. That night they're woken by a banging noise. Their grandfather goes to investigate, finding Wan sobbing and banging on the floor. The next morning at breakfast, Wan talks about how well she slept, seeming oblivious to last night's event.

Phong visits an old employee from his days in law enforcement to talk about his daughter's case. In his office there's a photograph of Phong in uniform on the wall labeled "Lt.Gen. Somphong Chaiyawan. Head of Crime Suppression Division 2007-2011". He asks to see his daughter's case file, inquiring after the owner of the car, a teenager named Chaiyut, whose father is a real estate tycoon named Apiwat. Chaiyut claims his friend was driving, as he and his girlfriend had high blood alcohol content. Phong gets irate and asserts that Chaiyut could have used his wealth to pay his friend to take the fault, and demands justice. He swears that if the system doesn't work he will do it himself. Back at home Pim discovers Fame's phone where he left it on the couch. She is elated and begins to look for the blackmail video, but is interrupted by a scraping sound coming from the hole. Putt tells her he's looked through it before, and can see the house next door as well as a "creepy girl". Pim tells him to keep a lookout for their grandparents while she looks through the hole. She sees the decayed looking house, with the closet door open and a small figure crawling out of it leaving a trail of dark fluid behind her before vomiting the same dark fluid. She tells Putt who looks and sees the girl with the black face standing in the room, now with a hole directly through her head. Pim tries to convince Putt to go next door to help her but he refuses, adamant that the girl is a ghost. Pim looks again and sees the girl with the black face holding an infant in her arms that she then vomits black onto. She pulls back and tells Putt to stay away, now convinced that whatever they're seeing isn't real.

That evening, Latte reappears and Pim finds the video of herself showering on Fame's phone. Later, Putt wakes up in the middle of the night to a scraping noise. He sees a girl in a nightgown sitting on Pim's bed, stroking her face. He screams, waking Pim, and they argue over what he saw. A pair of bare feet in a nightgown are shown outside their door. Putt wakes up with a nosebleed, feeling sick. Pim gets their grandmother against Putt's wishes. A newspaper headline reveals that Chaiyut, the tycoon's son, has "walked free" after his friend confessed to being the driver during the hit and run. Phong breaks down by his daughter's hospital bed and swears he'll hunt him down. At home Wan brings Putt some milk and he asks her about what his mother was like as a child. Wan says she was a popular, perfect girl, just like Pim. Wan implies something happened that drove Mai apart from them, but refuses to say what, instead asking to see Putt's sketchbook. Inside she sees a drawing of a girl with a spiral hole in her head and gets angry, while Putt denies he drew it. She has a moment of vagueness before telling Putt to drink the milk she brought and leaving. When Putt looks at the sketchbook again the drawing is gone. He knocks over the glass of milk in the process, and Latte drinks it from the floor.

It's announced that Pim was chosen to be head cheerleader again, despite two other girls being nominated. She confronts her friend Paew, who was also one of the ones nominated, having discovered text messages on Fame's phone that revealed Paew was the one who took the video and tried to get Fame to spread it around after having sex with him. Paew says that everyone hates her for being "perfect" and stuck up, and that she sent out the video earlier that day. The coach reveals she knew about the video and has proof enough to get Paew in serious trouble. When Pim gets home she finds Putt is getting sicker, and coughing up blood. She calls her grandfather who is shown to be crashing a party for Chaiyut. More banging from the hole wakes them up that night. Pim looks through it as Putt is too sick, and sees the black faced girl crawling through blood. A normal looking man is shown to be asleep on the couch next to empty bottles. They start to theorize that the black faced girl is trying to tell them how she died. Putt observes that the house looks exactly like their grandparents', pointing out the place on the wall where a clock used to be. In the house across the hall, a clock is hung in the same place. Putt tells Pim about wormholes, theorizing that the hole in the wall is showing them a different time or dimension. Their grandfather gets home, and they ask him about the house next door, and if a girl died there. He gets angry and says the house has been abandoned for a long time, and that there was never any dead girl. He moves a bookcase to hide the spot where they say the hole is.

Phong goes upstairs and retrieves his old uniform and service revolver from his closet. The bookshelf in front of the hole falls over, summoning Pim, Putt, and their grandmother. Meanwhile Chiayut is shown drinking and driving once more, bragging to his friend about his father owning the police. In a tunnel he almost collides with a parked car. Phong gets out and approaches, in uniform. Chiayut attempts to bribe him, then pulls a gun before being slammed into the steering wheel and beaten by Phong, who then pours the remains of the liquor over him and lights him on fire. At the hospital, Mai wakes up and asks for her children. The doctors attempt to call Phong but cannot get through. Mai panics when she's told her children are with their grandparents. Pim and Putt tell their grandmother to go back to bed while they finish cleaning up. The scratching noise from the hole stops her, revealing she has heard it for 15 years though she has never looked through the hole. She reveals she lied to keep their grandfather from getting angry with her, and that he's been making her take the pills to keep her complacent. She begs Pim not to look, but is ignored. Pim sees the house, no longer decayed but fully furnished, and sees a young mother holding her infant child, and a man asleep on the couch. The mother wakes up the man, who she calls Krit, and asks him where Pinya is. A younger version of Wan and Phong, who is in his uniform, come into view, talking to the woman who is revealed to be Mai. Pim tells the others what she saw and asks who Pinya is. Putt looks through the hole and sees Phong holding the bloody body of a young girl as Mai sobs. Wan pulls him away from the hole as he demands to know if the man on the couch is his father. A gunshot is heard.

Phong arrives at the hospital to find Mai missing from her bed. Wan explains that Phong and her had gone out with Mai, leaving Pinya with her father, Krit, resulting in Pinya's death. A flashback shows Krit painting and drinking heavily, as Pinya shown to have a heavily swollen face, asks to play a hide and seek. She gets into the closet, accidentally locking herself inside where she found and drank a bottle of rat poison. Wan claimed Pinya was never "right in the head", and must've thought the poison was syrup. Another flashback shows Krit dead on the floor from a gunshot wound to the head, which Phong says was suicide from guilt. In the present day, Putt vomits blood onto the table. Pim wants to take him to a doctor but Wan says she's overreacting and takes Putt to bed. Mai arrives in a taxi at the house, and discovers a dead Latte in the garbage. Inside, Wan tries to force Putt to drink milk, calling him "Pinya" as she does. Mai's arrival stops her. She is overjoyed to see Mai, who spurns her and tries to take her kids and run, but is stopped by Phong, brandishing his gun. Mai confronts him, claiming he had something to do with Krit's death, which he reacts to guiltily, but puts the gun away. Putt continues to get sick, prompting Pim to tell Mai about the milk, connecting his illness to what she saw of Pinya. She goes to drink the milk herself, as Wan screams at her to stop, but it is launched out of her hand by an unseen force. Flashbacks show Wan treating Pinya cruelly due to her different face, before cooing over Pim for being a pretty baby. Mai confronts her mother about poisoning Putt and Pinya. Phong argues that she would never do such a thing and blames everything on Krit, which Mai refutes. Wan finally snaps, blaming Mai for marrying a lowlife like Krit and calling Pinya and Putt freaks, and that she was doing Mai a favor by "cleansing" things. She takes her kids and leaves. Pim looks back to see the hole still there, and as Wan collapses, sobbing, Pinya is shown to be on the other side.

Back at their real home, Mai tells Putt and Pim about Pinya, and their father who was an artist like Putt. She told Pim that Pinya would sing her to sleep, a tune that Pim still knows. Pim then asks if Mai is sure they know the whole truth. Putt agrees and asks Mai to be honest with them about their father. They mention the hole, which Mai can also see. It showed up after Krit died, and never went away, even when their grandfather tried to cover it. Mai never looked through it. Wan wakes up in the night from the scratching noise. She yells, waking up Phong who still cannot hear it. Phong receives a phone call from his old employee who tells him about Chaiyut, and asks his whereabouts. He then informs Phong that they retrieved evidence proving Chaiyut wasn't driving after all, making his murder meaningless. Downstairs, Wan opens the closet to find Pinya's ghost, who hugs her and vomits blood. Phong comes downstairs to find Wan thrashing on the floor, and sees a bottle of rat poison in her hand. As Wan continues to convulse, Phong sees the burning ghost of Chaiyut. He shoots at the ghost in fear, hitting Wan instead and killing her. He then turns the gun on himself and fires through his mouth, creating the very hole in the wall that he could never see. A flashback shows Mai looking through the hole, watching as Pinya hides in the closet, and Wan from the past, noticing the door is left ajar, closes and bolts it. Another flashback reveals Mai was the one to shoot Krit, furious at him for letting their child die. Phong helps her cover up the murder as a suicide. We see present day Mai putting on lipstick and smiling. In her room, Pim lies on her bed, with the black ghost of Pinya laying next to her, holding her hand.

== Cast ==
- Sompob Benjathikul as Phong
- Sadanont Durongkaweroj
- Steven Isarapong
- Thasorn Klinnium
- Mac Nattapat Nimjirawat
- Keetapat Pongrue
- Nicole Theriault as Mai
- Tarika Tidatid
- Sutatta Udomsilp as Pim
