= Supassrathip Akkrathaweepatch =

Thai actress and model (born 1995)

- สุภัสสราทิพ อัครทวีพัชร์
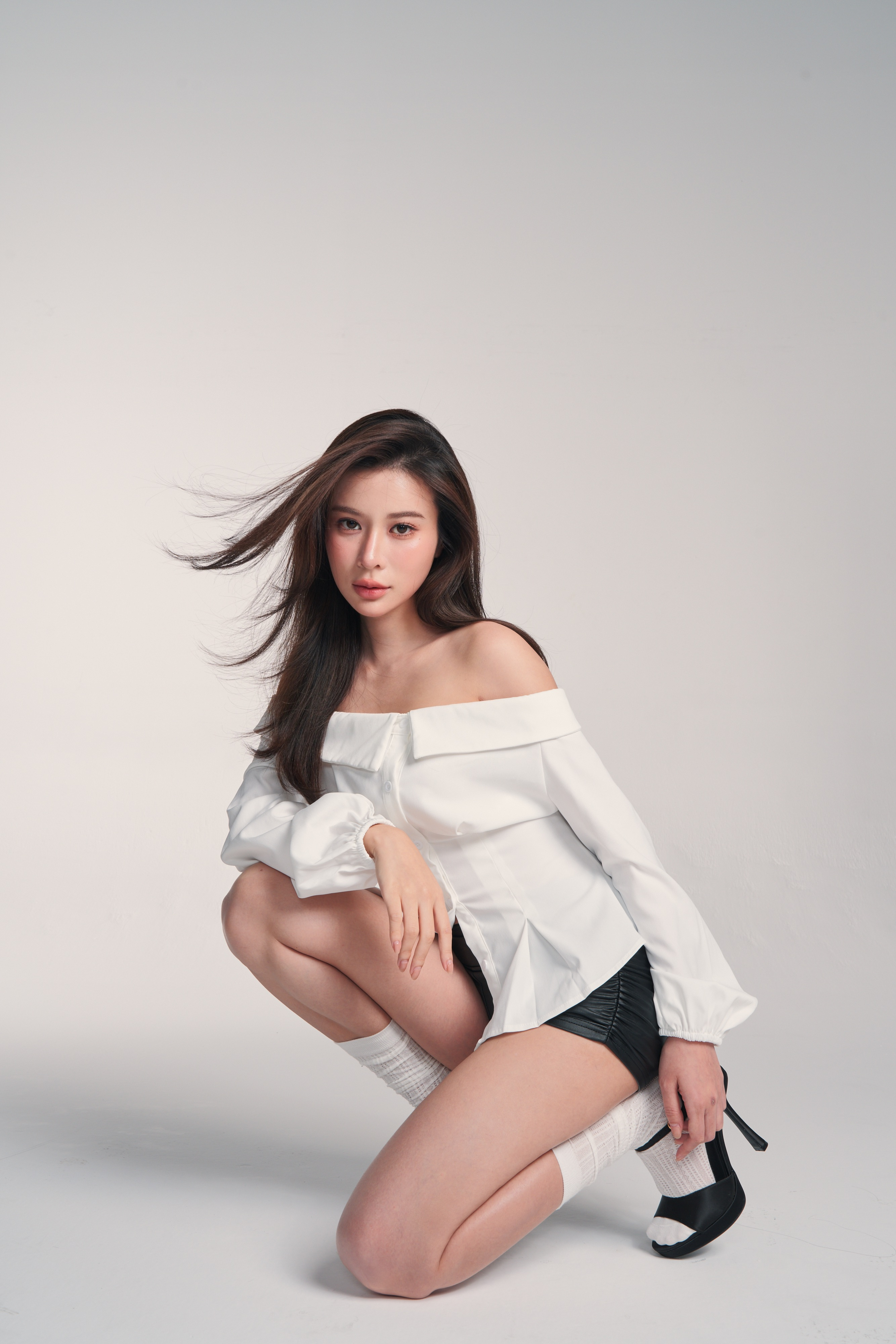
- Born: Supassara Thanachat; 29 April 1995 (age 31); Bangkok, Thailand
- Other name: Kao
- Education: Kasetsart University
- Occupations: Actor; Model; YouTuber; Businessperson
- Years active: 2011–present
- Agent: Channel 3 (2017–2022)
- Height: 1.60 m (5 ft 3 in)

Supassrathip Akkrathaweepatch (Thai: สุภัสสราทิพ อัครทวีพัชร์; born 29 April 1995), formerly Supassara Thanachat (Thai: สุภัสสรา ธนชาต), nicknamed Kao (Thai: เก้า), is a Thai actress and model. She gained widespread recognition for her role as Sprite in the hit television series Hormones (2013). After beginning her career with TV Thunder and later signing with Channel 3, she became a freelance artist in 2022.

== Early life and education ==
Supassrathip was born in Bangkok, Thailand. In terms of education, she completed her primary education at Tiwpaingam School, lower secondary education at St. Francis Xavier Convent School, and upper secondary education at Samsen Wittayalai School (English Program). During her study, she was a Samsen Star of Class 57 or Saiyut Class. She graduated with a bachelor's degree in economics from Kasetsart University, majoring in Entrepreneurial Economics (International Program).

== Career ==
Supassrathip began her acting career with appearances in various television shows and is best known for her breakthrough role as Sprite in the popular teen drama Hormones: The Series, which aired from 2013. Her portrayal of a complex and free-spirited character dealing with personal and social issues garnered significant attention and praise, making her a household name in Thailand. She continued her role in the subsequent seasons of the series.

Following Hormones, Supassrathip expanded her acting portfolio with diverse roles in both television and film. She starred in the mystery thriller film The Swimmers in 2014, and other films such as Last Summer (2013), Buppha Ratree: Haunting in Japan (2016) and Love and Run (2019)

In the beginning of her career, she was signed with TV Thunder until her contract expired in 2016. The following year, she signed with Channel 3 Thailand, where she took on prominent roles in dramas such as Kom Faek (2018) and My Secret Bride (2019). Since becoming a freelance artist in 2022, Supassrathip has actively taken on diverse roles across film and television. In 2023, she starred as Mirin in the series Faceless Love, a Thai adaptation of the Japanese drama Rich Man, Poor Woman.

Looking ahead, Supassrathip has several notable projects slated for release in 2025: She will make her international film debut in the horror movie Kong Tao, a multinational production featuring actors from Hong Kong, Malaysia, and Singapore. In the film, she portrays a determined journalist investigating a series of gruesome beheadings.

She is set to appear in the television series Rabbit on the Moon, where she plays the character of "Pugh" Phitcha.

A significant new venture for Supassrathip is her leading role in the Girls' Love (GL) series Love Design, produced by Velcurve Studio. She stars alongside Methika Jiranorraphat in this series, which she will portray the character of Aokbab. The story explores the evolving relationship between two female architects.

Beyond acting, Supassrathip is also recognized for her strong presence in the fashion and endorsement industries. She has been a brand ambassador for Garnier Thailand since at least 2010, a long-standing endorsement. Her fashion engagements include modeling for luxury brands such as Louis Vuitton, Prada, Longchamp, Longines, Ferragamo, Polo Ralph Lauren, and Loewe in Thailand. She also has business ventures, including an ice cream business called "Bellio" and a company specializing in dog seat covers.

== Political stance ==
Supassrathip supported the 2020–2021 Thai protests and opposed the use of violence in the 2020 Pathumwan dispersal.

== Filmography ==
=== Television ===
Year	Title	Role	Notes	Network
2012	Club Friday The Series	Jane	Episode: "Club Friday The Series 1"	Green Channel
2013	Hormones: The Series	Sprite	Main role	GTH On Air / GMM One
2014	Hormones: The Series Season 2	Sprite	Main role	GTH On Air / GMM One
2015	Hormones 3 The Final Season	Sprite	Guest role	One HD
2015	Stay The Series	Jook	Main role	Line TV
2015	Love Songs Love Stories: Pae Jai	Mameaw		GMM 25
2016	Love Songs Love Series: Prophecy	Ann	Main role	GMM 25
2016	O-Negative	Foon	Main role	GMM 25
2017	Project S The Series: SOS Skate For Love	Bell	Main role	GMM 25
2017	The Moment	Jeab		
2018	Love Songs Love Series: Our Story	Eve	Main role	GMM 25
2018	Kom Faek	Tapao	Main role	Channel 3
2018	Anguished Love	Sarapee / Nisa	Main role	Channel 3
2019	Kao Waan Hai Noo Pen Sai Lub (My Secret Bride)	Suam / Thanamas	Main role	Channel 3
2020	My Forever Sunshine	Paeng	Main role	Channel 3
2021	IRIS	Pat	Main role	GMM 25
2022	The Root	Sai	Main role	GMM 25
2022	If The World Doesn't Have GPS		Guest role	
2022	Astrophile	Nan	Guest role	GMM 25
2023	Faceless Love	Mirin	Main role	GMM 25
2025	Rabbit on the Moon	"Pugh" Phitcha	Main role	ONE31
2025	Love Design	Aokbab	Main role	WeTV/Channel 3/Netflix
2026	The Scammer Games	Risa	Main role	WeTV/Channel 3/Netflix
2026	Some Things Stay	Paengped	Main role	TrueVisions NOW

=== Movies ===
Year	Title	Role	Notes
2013	Last Summer	Joy	Lead Role
2013	The Taste of Love	Kao	
2014	The Swimmers	Ice	Lead Role
2016	Buppha Ratree: Haunting in Japan	Rose	
2019	Love and Run	Lin	
2025	Kong Tao	Journalist	International film debut
2025	Tee Yai: Born to Be Bad	Dao	Netflix film

== Music ==
=== Soundtrack appearances ===
Year	Title	Series / Film	Notes
2020	"ช่วยกลับมากวนหัวใจ" (Chuay Glap Ma Guan Hua Jai)	My Forever Sunshine (ตราบฟ้ามีตะวัน)	OST
2025	"ออกแบบรัก" (Love Design)	Love Design (รับ(รัก)ออกแบบ)	OST
2025	"ช่วยทำให้มันจบ" (Let It End)	Love Design (รับ(รัก)ออกแบบ)	OST

=== Music video appearances ===
Year	Title	Artist
2012	"The More You Don't Know, The More You Have To Do"	Pop Pongkool
2013	"The World Is Ending"	Jeff Satur
2013	"Same Difference"	Getsunova
2014	"Take a Hot Shower"	Big Ass
2014	"Atmosphere"	Job Phongsakorn
2014	"Leave It"	Violette Wautier
2014	"Write The Word Love"	Bird Thongchai
2016	"Loyal"	Polycat
2016	"I'll Be Waiting Here"	Nack Charlie
2017	"Waiting For You To Be Sorry"	Lip Balm
2019	"Speechless"	The Toys
2019	"Stop" (Special Version)	BOYd KOSIYABONG Feat. MEAN
2020	"Magic"	Funky Wah Wah
2020	"It's My Turn"	Peck Palitchoke
2021	"The Sky Is Not Cooperating"	Clash
2022	"Ask For What?" (Wash Fore?)	Clear
2024	"Just a Younger Brother" (Brother Zone)	BUS7
2025	"Just Take It Back"	Knomjean
2025	"Breaking Heart Station"	ZeePruk

== Discography ==
=== Singles ===
Year	Title (Romanized)	Title (Thai/Chinese)	Notes
2017	Fuen	ฝืน	From the movie Our Love: The Moment (รักของเรา The Moment). Performed with Boat Somkiat. Original song by Gree See Cafe.
2018	Trap Chee Wit Ja Ha Mai	ตราบชีวิตจะหาไม่	Official soundtrack for the drama Kham Faek (คมแฝก). Solo performance.
2019	Yak Tor Wayla	อยากต่อเวลา	Official soundtrack for the drama Khao Wan Hai Nu Pen Sai Lab (เขาวานให้หนูเป็นสายลับ). Solo performance.
2021	Suay Pung (Mung Pen Fan Pee)	สวยพุ่ง (มุ่งเป็นแฟนพี่)	Collaboration with Wonderframe and Ble Patumrach. Original artist is Wonderframe.
2026	Break My Rules		
2026	Neon Dream	霓梦	

=== Music videos ===
Year	Title (Romanized)	Title (Thai/Chinese)	Notes
2026	Neon Dream	霓梦	YouTube

=== Music video appearances ===
Year	Song title (Romanized)	Song title (Thai)	Artist
2012	Ying Mai Roo Ying Tong Tam	ยิ่งไม่รู้ ยิ่งต้องทำ	Pop Pongkool
2013	Loke Taek	โลกแตก	Jeff Catter
2013	Taek Tang Meuan Gan	แตกต่างเหมือนกัน	Getsunova
2014	Arb Nam Ron	อาบน้ำร้อน	Big Ass
2014	Bannakat	บรรยากาศ	Job Pongsakorn
2014	Fark Wai	ฝากไว้	Vee Violette
2014	Kian Kum Wa Rak	เขียนคำว่ารัก	Bird Thongchai
2016	Pak Dee	ภักดี	Polycat
2016	Ja Raw Yoo Trong Nee	จะรออยู่ตรงนี้	Nak Charlie
2017	Raw Tur Sia Jai	รอเธอเสียใจ	Lipta
2019	Poot Mai Ork	พูดไม่ออก	The Toys
2019	Yood (Special Version)	หยุด (Special Version)	Boyd Kosiyabong feat. Mean
2020	Magic	Funky Wah Wah	
2020	IT'S MY TURN	Peck Palitchoke	
2021	Fah Mai Pen Jai	ฟ้าไม่เป็นใจ	Clash
2022	Wah Fore?	ถามเพื่ออะไร	Klear
2022	Chop Pa Nia	ชอบป้ะเนี่ย	Mai Davika
2024	Kae Nong Chai	แค่น้องชาย	BUS7
2025	Kae Ao Keun	แค่เอาคืน	Knomjean

== Concerts ==
Year	Concert Title	Role / Notes
2018	LOVE IS IN THE AIR : CHANNEL 3 CHARITY CONCERT	Performer
2020	50 Years of Channel 3 Channel 3 Infinity Happiness	Performer (part of Channel 3's 50th-anniversary celebration)
2022	SIDE BY SIDE Bright-Win Concert	Guest performer (for Win Metawin)

== Fan Meets ==
Year	Concert Title	Location	Dates	Notes
2026	"Love is Timing" Fan Meet	Nanning, China	April 19, 2026	
2026	"Still Me, Growing With You" Birthday Concert	Bangkok, Thailand	May 4, 2026	
2026	"Still Me, Growing With You" Birthday Concert	Taipei, Taiwan	May 10, 2026	
2026	"Still Me, Growing With You" Birthday Concert	Hong Kong	May 24, 2026	

== Endorsements ==
Year	Brand	Title
2010 - current	Garnier	Spokesperson
2021 - current	Longines	Friends of Longines
2021 - current	cute press	Brand Representative
2023 - current	sasi	Face of sasi
2026 - current	Elravie	Brand Ambassador
2026 - current	Sleeping Cloud	Brand Representative

== Awards and nominations ==
Award nominations for Supassrathip Akkrathaweepatch
Year	Award	Category	Nominee(s)	Result	Ref.
2014	M Thai Top Talk About 2014	Most Talked About Actress	N/A	Won	
2017	Kazz Awards 2017	Bang Girl of The Year 2017 (สาวปังแห่งปี 2017)	N/A	Won	
2023	19th Kom Chad Luek Awards	Best Leading Actress	The Root (รากแก้ว)	Nominated	
2023	Maya TV Awards 2023	Charming Star of the Year (ดาวรุ่งชายยอดเยี่ยมแห่งปี)	N/A	Nominated	
2026	Feed x Khaosod Awards 2026	Girls' Love Actress of the Year	Love Design	Nominated	
