= Teenage Mom: The Series =

2017 Thai television series

- Official series poster
- Thai: คุณแม่วัยใส The Series
- Genre: Romance; Drama
- Created by: GMMTV
- Based on: "คุณแม่วัยใส" (Teenage Mom) comic by LINE WEBTOON
- Directed by: Weerachit Thongjila
- Starring: Perawat Sangpotirat; Methika Jiranorraphat
- Country of origin: Thailand
- Original language: Thai
- No. of episodes: 8

Production
- Producer: Housestories 8
- Running time: 50 minutes
- Production companies: GMMTV; Housestories 8

Original release
- Network: LINE TV; One31 (Rerun); GMM 25 (Rerun)
- Release: 19 August – 7 October 2017

Teenage Mom: The Series (Thai: คุณแม่วัยใส The Series; Khun Mae Wai Sai The Series) is a 2017 Thai television series starring Perawat Sangpotirat (Krist) and Methika Jiranorraphat (Jane).

Directed by Weerachit Thongjila and produced by GMMTV together with Housestories 8, the series was one of the six television series for 2017 showcased by GMMTV in their "6 Natures+" event on 2 March 2017. It premiered on LINE TV on 19 August 2017, airing on Saturdays at 19:00 ICT. The series concluded on 7 October 2017.

The series was rerun on One31 on 19 February 2018, airing on Mondays at 22:45 ICT and currently on GMM 25 airing on Fridays at 22:30 ICT.

== Cast and characters ==
Below are the cast of the series:

=== Main ===
- Perawat Sangpotirat (Krist) as Mek
- Methika Jiranorraphat (Jane) as Fah

=== Supporting ===
- Rachwin Wongviriya (Koy) as Jane
- Supakan Benjaarruk (Nok) as Khing
- Apichaya Saejung (Ciize) as Mint
- Penpak Sirikul (Tai) as Mek's mother
- Sakuntala Teinpairoj (TonHorm) as Nop
- Pornnappan Pornpenpipat (Nene) as Fon

=== Guest role ===
- Atthaphan Phunsawat (Gun) as a dentist
- Jumpol Adulkittiporn (Off) as a dentist assistant
- Puttichai Kasetsin (Push) as DJ Putt
- Chaleumpol Tikumpornteerawong (Jack) as Pose
- Prachaya Ruangroj (Singto) as a hospital visitor
- Niti Chaichitathorn (Pompam) as a pharmacist
- Watchara Sukchum (Jennie) as a party girl (Ep. 4)
- Boriboon Chanrueng as an air conditioning technician
- Nalin Hohler as a nurse

== Soundtrack ==
Song title	Romanized title	Artist(s)	Ref.
เลือกที่จะรัก	Lerk Tee Ja Ruk	Ramida Jiranorraphat (Jane)	
