= List of Thai television soap operas =

The following is a list of lakorns, or Thai television soap operas.

== 1980s ==
- Tuk Kae (1983) - Apichat Halamjiak, Rosario Chandra, and Sida Puapimon
- Si Quey (1984) - Terdporn Manopaiboon
- Tee Yai (1985) - Chatchai Plengpanich and Thapakorn Ditsayanan
- Prissana (1987) - Chatchai Plengpanich and Lalita Panyopas
- Num Thip (1987) - Panya Nirankun and Mayura Sawetsila
- Sarawat Tuen (1987) - Chatchai Plengpanich and Pisan Akaraseranee
- Kaew Klang Dong (1987) - Orapan Panthong and Pongpat Wachirabunjong
- Sakao Duen (1987) - Monrudee Yamaphai, Apichat Halamjiak, and Naowarat Yuktanan
- Tukkata (1988) - Kanyalak Bamrungrak, Mayura Sawetsila, and Nirut Sirichanya

== 1990s ==
- Phai Daeng (1990) - Kowit Wattanakul and Bin Bunluerit
- Khu Kam (1990) - Bird McIntyre and Komolchanok Komolthiti
- La Ong Dao (1990) - Siriam Pakdeedumrongrit and Warut Woratham
- Chaloey Sak (1991) - Likit Ekmongkol and Chintara Sukapatana
- Wanida (1991) - Sarunyoo Wongkrachang and Lalita Panyopas
- Nai Fun (1992) - Chatchai Plengpanich, Warut, Sinjai, and Lalita Panyopas
- Aroon Sawas (1992) - Sornram Teppitak and Wichuda Suansuwan
- Lord Lai Mungkorn (1992) - Nappon Gomarachun and Preeyanuch Panpradub
- Pai Lod Gor (1992) - Ann Thongprasom and Bpop Ponrath
- Mu Daeng (1992) - Ann Thongprasom and Pairoj Sangwoributr
- Song Fang Klong (1992) - Yuranunt Pamornmontri and Chintara Sukapatana
- One Nee Tee Raw Koy (1993) - Bird Thongchai McIntyre and Siriam Pakdeedumrongrit
- Payong (1993) - Sornram Teppitak and Suvanant Kongying
- Plai Fon Ton Nao (1994) - Sarunyoo Wongkrachang, Komolchanok Komolthiti, and Ratchaneekorn Panmanee
- Tawipob (1994) - Sarunyoo Wongkrachang and Siriam Pakdeedumrongrit
- Yam Mur Lom Pat Huan (1994) - Jetrin Wattanasin and Lalita Panyopas
- Took Ka Ta Lung Labum (1994) - Joe Wattanasin and Lalita Panyopas
- Dao pra sook Morning Star (1994) - Sornram Teppitak and Suvanant Kongying
- Sarawat Yai (1994) - Likit Ekmongkol, Monrudee Yamaphai, and Yuttapichai Chanlaekha
- Prasard Mued (1994) - Willy McIntosh and Lalita Panyopas
- Vimarn Maprao (1994) - Chadaporn Rattanakorn, Satawat Dunyawichit, Tik Shiro, and Panya Nirankun
- Krasue (1994–1995) - Ratchaneekorn Panmanee, Satawat Dunyawichit, and Nam-nguen Boonnak
- Prik Key Noo Kub Moo Ham (1995) - Saharat Sangkapreecha and Lalita Panyopas
- Lued Khao Ta (1995) - Juckkrit Amarat, Santisuk Promsiri, and Piacher Christensen
- Fai Tang See (1995) - Willy McIntosh and Lalita Panyopas
- Nam Sai Jai Jring (1995) - Sornram Teppitak, Katreeya English, Somchai Kemglad, and Myria Benedetti
- Poot Pitsawat (1995) - Touch Na Takuatung and Kullasatree Siripongpreeda
- Kho Mon Bai Nan Thi Thoe Fan Yam Nun (1995) - Sornram Teppitak and Suttida Kasemsan Na Ayutthaya
- Sai Lohit Bloodline (1995) - Sornram Teppitak and Suvanant Kongying
- Mon Rak Luk Thung (1995) - Sarunyoo Wongkrachang, Natrika Thampridanant, Anan Bunnak, Ratchaneekorn Panmanee, and Nam-nguen Boonnak
- Yark Yood Tawan Wai Tee Plai Fah (1995) - Saksit Tangthong and Kathaleeya McIntosh
- Tong Nueng (1996) - Siriam Pakdeedumrongrit
- Nai Khanom Tom (1996) - Somrak Kamsing, Kullanat Preeyawat, Samart Payakaroon, Khaosai Galaxy, Vichairachanon Khadpo, Dhawee Umponmaha, and Phajol Moolsan
- Police Jab Khamoy (1996) - Juckkrit Amarat, Thanakorn Posayanon, Khemupsorn Sirisukha, and Pongpat Wachirabunjong
- Sai See Pleng (1996) - Willy McIntosh and Lalita Panyopas
- Torfun Kub Marvin (1996) - Krekpon Mussayawanich, Phiyada Akkraseranee, and Ekachai Buranapanit
- Banjarong Ha Si (1996) - Chintara Sukapatana, Natrika Thampridanant, Chadaporn Rattanakorn, Supaporn Kumnuansilp, and Bin Bunluerit
- Son Satan (1996) - Andrew Gregson, Ramona Zanolari, and Angela Zanolari
- Pob Pee Fa (1997) - Woranut Wongsawan and Usamanee Waitayanon
- Tam Hua Jai Pai Sood Lah (1997) - Willy McIntosh and Lalita Panyopas
- Fai Luong (1998) - Willy McIntosh and Tao Sarocha
- Sapan Dao (1999) - Art Supawatt Purdy and Sririta Jensen
- Jaosao Prisana (1999) - Ann Thongprasom and Nok Chatchai
- Petch Ta Maeow (1999) - Worarat Suwannarat and Art Supawatt Purdy
- Peang Kae Jai Rao Rak Gun (1999)

== 2000s ==
- Hong Neu Mangkorn (2000) - Marsha Wattanapanich and Saksit Tangthong
- Peang Kae Jai Rao Rak Gun (2000) - Art Supawatt Purdy and Nusaba Wanichangkul
- Rarknakara (2000) - Pachrapa Chaichua and Woranuch Wongsawan
- Kurak Kurob (2000) - Art Supawatt Purdy and Claudia Chakrapan
- Mae Nak (2000) - Pachrapa Chaichua and Pete Thongjeur
- Hua Jai Song Park (2000) - Art Supawatt Purdy and Sara Malakul Lane
- Snow Ban Chow, Kudkao Ban Yen (2000) - Siriam Pakdeedumrongrit and Art Supawatt Purdy
- Jao Kum Nai Waen (2001) - Lalita Panyopas and Pip Ravit
- Pet Thut Pet (2001) - Pachrapa Chaichua and Jetrin Wattanasin
- Fai Kamatep (2001) - Art Supawatt Purdy and Kullasatree Siripongpreeda
- Keb Pandin (2001) Phutanate Hongmanop and Phiyada Akkraseranee
- Ruk Kerd Nai Tarad Sod (2001) Andrew Gregson and Phiyada Akkraseranee
- Sapai jow (2002) - Saharat Sangkapreecha and Sunisa Jett
- Seur See Fuune (2002) - Ann Thongprasom and Chai Chatayodom
- Roy lae sanae rai (2002) - Jesdaporn Pholdee and Phiyada Akkraseranee
- Khon Rerng Muang (2002) - Mai Charoenpura and Art Supawatt Purdy
- Khon Rerng Muang (2002)
- Kammtape Tua Noy (2003) - Pachrapa Chaichua and Shakrit Yamnam
- Muang Dala (2003) - Phutanate Hongmanop and Phiyada Akkraseranee
- Leurd kuttiya (2003) - Jesdaporn Pholdee and Phiyada Akkraseranee
- Nang Fah Rai Peak Angel with no wings (2004) - Ann Thongprasom and Andy Wantsharat
- Nang Sao Jingjai Gup Nai Sandee (2004) - Pachrapa Chaichua and Jesdaporn Pholdee
- Mae ai sa eun (2005) - Veeraparb Suparbpaiboon and Woranut Wongsawan
- Pleung Payu (2000) - Pachrapa Chaichua and Tana Suttikhamol
- Saung sanaeha (2005) - Veeraparb Suparbpaiboon and Pachrapa Chaichua
- Gularb see dum (2005) - Chakrit Yamnam and Lalita Panyopas
- Song Rao Nirund Dom(2005) Teeradeth Wongpuapun and Phiyada Akkraseranee
- Duang Jai Patiharn Miracle of the Heart (2005)- Sornram Teppitak and Suvanant Kongying
- Hua Jai Chocolate (2005) Patiparn Pataweekarn and Phiyada Akkraseranee
- Oum Ruk Chain of Love (2006) - Teeradeth Wongpuapun and Ann Thongprasom
- Pinmook (2006) - Pachrapa Chaichua and Cee Seewat
- Kaew Tah Pee (2006) - Tik Jesdaporn Pholdee and Cherry Khemupsorn Sirisukha
- Sai Leud Hang Ruk (2006) - Paul Pattrapon and Pachrapa Chaichua
- Lady Maha-chon (2006) - Paula Taylor and Erich Fleshman
- Naruk (2006)
- Tae Jai Ruk Nak Wang Pan (2006)
- Bua prim num (2007) - Tiksadee Sahawong and Rujira Chuaykuer
- Theptida kon nok (2007) - Janie Tienphosuwan Pornchita Na Songkla Tai Natapon
- Rangrit Pisawad (2007) - Pachrapa Chaichua and Stephan Santi
- Ruk Tur Took Wan(2007) Teeradeth Wongpuapun and Phiyada Akkraseranee
- Likit Gammatheap (2007) - Ann Thongprasom and Kritsada Pornwaerod
- Ram Pissawad (2007) - Pattarapol Silpajarn and Napapa Tuntrakul
- Pleng Ruk Rim Fung Kong (2007)- Alexandra Bounxouei and Sukollawat Kanarot
- Rahut Risaya (2007) - Pattarapol Silpajarn and Woranut Wongsawan
- Fah Mee Tawun Hua Jai Chun Mee Tur (2007) - Sornram Teppitak and Warattaya Nilkuha
- Bu Peh Leh Ruk (2007) - Pachrapa Chaichua and Nattawut Skidjai
- Nong Miew Kearl Petch (2007) - Savika Chaiyadej and Siwat Chotchaicharin
- Dang Duang Harutai (2007) - Sukollawat Kanarot and Usamanee Waitayanon
- Rak Nee Hua Jai Rao Jong This Love Belongs to Our Heart (2007)- Teeradeth Wongpuapun and Janie Tienphosuwan
- Song Kram Nang Fah Battle of Angels (2008)- Namthip Jongrachatawiboon and Nawat Kulrattanarak with Saharat Sangkapreecha
- Jam Loey Rak Defendant of Love (2008)- Aum Atichart and Aff Takasorn
- Yuy Fah Ta Din (2008) - Pachrapa Chaichua and Weir Sukkolawat
- Sawan Biang Paridise Diversion (2008) - Teeradeth Wongpuapun and Ann Thongprasom
- Tueng Rai Kor Ruk (2008) - Paul Pattarapon and Namfon Patcharin
- Ba Darn Jai Nether Heart (2008) - Aum Atichart and Margie Rasee
- Sud Daen Hua Jai (2008) - Num Sornram Teppitak and Yardthip
- Botun Gleep Sudtai (2008) - Aum Atichart and Aff Takasorn
- Nang Tard (2008)- Suvanant Kongying and Vee Veerapat
- Silamanee (2008) - Suvanant Kongying and Paul Pattarapon
- Ngao Asoke (2008) - Pong Nawat and Pueng Kanya
- Tur Keu Cheewit (You Are My Life; 2008) - Sawika Chaiyadech, Sukollawat Kanarot, Usamanee Waitayanon
- Artit Ching Duang (2009)
- Mia Luang (2009) - Pachrapa Chaichua and Teerapat Sajakhul
- Jaew Jai Rai (2009) - Pachrapa Chaichua and Pae Airak
- Kwarm Rub Korng Superstar (2008) - Mos Pattiparn, Bee Namthip, Captain Puthanate, and Best Aticha
- Porp Pee Faa (2009) - Oil Thana, Sammie Bunthitha, and Yui Chiranan
- Sood Sanae Ha (2009) - Teeradeth Wongpuapun and Ann Thongprasom
- Kom Faek II (2009) - Poh Nattawut, Noon Worranuch, Oh Anuchyd, Cheer Thikumporn, Cee Siwat, Benz Punyapon, Kelly Rattapong, Pang Ornjira
- Dong Poo Dee (2009)
- Buang Ruk Kamathep (2009)

== 2010s ==
- Kularb Neua Mek (2010) - Pachrapa Chaichua and Woranuch Wongsawan
- Prajun Lai Payuk (2010) - Pachrapa Chaichua and Weir Sukollawat
- Phaw Nu Bpen Superstar (2010) - Sukollawat Kanarot and Jakajaan Akumsiri
- Taddao Bussaya (2010) - Thrisadee Sahawong and Worakarn Rojanawat
- Koo Kan San Ruk (2010) - Pachrapa Chaichua and Shakrit Yamnam
- 365 Wan Haeng Ruk (2010) - Teeradeth Wongpuapun and Ann Thongprasom
- Sao Chai Hi-Tech (2010) - Akkaphan Namart and Warattaya Nilkuha
- Suay Rerd Cherd Sode (2010) - Janie Tienphosuwan
- Wan Jai Gub Nai Jom Ying (2010)
- Pathapee Leh Ruk (2010)
- Kha Khong Khun (2011) - Pong Nawat and Woranut Wongsawan
- Kularb Rai Glay Ruk (2011) - Grate Warinton and Peeranee Kongthai
- Bundai Dok Ruk (Staircase of Crown Flowers; 2011) - Akkaphan Namart and Peechaya Wattanamontree with Sammy Cowell
- Dok Som Si Thong (2011) - Araya A. Hargate and Louis Scott
- Ruk Pathiharn (2011)
- Tawan Deard (2011)
- Sua Sung Fah (The Tiger commands the Heaven; 2011) - Rangsiroj Panpeng, Kelly Tanapat, Chanapol Satya, Ploypapas Thananchaiyakarn, Chartchai Ngamsan
- Dok Soke (Sad Flower; 2012) - The latest of one remakes of the same story; the earliest work aired in 1995. Cheribelle Lanlalin, Nawat Kulrattanarak, Sopitnapa Chumpanee and Kriangkrai Aunhanan with Jarunee Suksawat
- Raeng Ngao (2012) - The latest of four remakes of the same story; the earliest work aired in 1986
- Nuer Mek 2 (2012)
- Khu Kam (Sunset at Chaopraya; 2013) - The latest of five remakes of the same story; the earliest work aired in 2000. Sukrit Wisetkaew, Nuengthida Sopon, Napat Intarajaieua and Sorapong Chatree
- Khun Chai Ronapee (2013)
- Dome Thong (Golden Dome; 2013) - The latest of two remakes of the same story; the earliest work aired in 1999. Tussaneeya Karnsomnut, Veeraparb Suparbpaiboon and Duangdao Jarujinda with Jiranan Manojam
- Luerd Chao Phraya (Blood of Chao Phraya; 2013) - Thana Suttikamul, Jiranan Manojam, Rangsiroj Panpeng and Pattaradet Sanguankwamdee with Arpa Pawilai
- Fai Huan (Masquerade; 2013) - A story of murder and revenge. BBTV Channel 7
- Peek Mongkut (Wings of Desire; 2014) - Khemanit Jamikorn, Wongsakorn Poramathakorn, Karnklao Duaysienklao and Nusba Punnakanta
- Cubic (2014) - Mobster falls in love with clever girl. Chalida Vijitvongthong and Tanin Manoonsilp
- Kom Payabaht (2014) - The latest of one remakes of the same story; the earliest work aired in 2001. Tussaneeya Karnsomnut, Tisanart Sornsuek and Pattaradet Sanguankwamdee
- La Ruk Sut Kop Fah (2014) - Peechaya Wattanamontree and Sukollawat Kanarot
- Khun Pee Tee Rak (Mr. Ghost, My Dear; 2014) - Pimchanok Luevisadpaibul and Saran Sirilak
- Plerng Chim Plee (2014) - Atichart Chumnanon and Ranee Campen
- Full House (2014)
- Pround (2014) - Pachrapa Chaichua and Sukollawat Kanarot
- Leelawadee Plerng (The Secret Truth; 2015) - Anyarin Terathananpat and Thanwa Suriyajak with Nusba Punnakanta
- Vimarn Mekhala (Mekkhala Heaven; 2015) - The latest of one remakes of the same story; the earliest work aired in 1999. Ranee Campen and Andrew Gregson
- Sud Kaen Saen Ruk (Most Hate, Most Love; 2015) - Atshar Nampan, Manasnan Panlertwongskul, Patiparn Pataweekarn, Rhatha Phongam and Ratklao Amaradit
- Waen Sawat (2015) - Khemanit Jamikorn
- Baan Saithong (Golden Sand House; 2015) - The latest of five remakes of the same story; the earliest work aired in 2000. Peechaya Wattanamontree and Veraparb Suparbpaiboon
- Rak Rae (Dahlia; 2015) - Khemanit Jamikorn, Akkaphan Namart and Sorapong Chatree with Princess Soamsavali
- Thong 10 (2015)
- Pleung Pra Nang (The Royal Fire; 2017) - The latest of one remakes of the same story; the earliest work aired in 1995. Pachrapa Chaichua, Jiranan Manojam and Kelly Tanapat with Tussaneeya Karnsomnut
- Rak Nakara (2017) - The latest of one remakes of the same story; the earliest work aired in 2000. Natapohn Tameeruks, Nittha Jirayungyurn and Prin Suparat
- Nam Sor Sai (2017) - The latest of four remakes of the same story; the earliest work aired in 2001. Sornram Teppitak, Suvanant Kongying and Sopitnapa Choompanee
- Khiao Ratchasi (2017)
- Ngao (2018)
- The Crown Princess (2018)
- Love Destiny (2018) - Ranee Campen and Thanavat Vatthanaputi
- Hua Jai Sila (2019)
- Mia Noi (2019)
- Fai Hima (2019)

== 2020s ==
- Game of Outlaws (2021)
- Bad Romeo (2022)
- Royal Doctor (2023)
- Doctor Detective (2023)
- The Bride of Naga (2023)
- Love Destiny 2 (2023)
- Blondie in an Ancient Time (2024)
- Master of the House (2024)
- Laplae the Hidden Town (2024)
