= Lhong Klin Chan =

- Also known as: Mystery of the Sandalwood Killer; Flower of Death
- Genre: Drama; Romance; Investigation
- Based on: Lhong Klin Chan by Nichnita
- Written by: Apiwat Laosakul; Natcha Lertthewasiri
- Directed by: Triyuth Kingphakorn
- Starring: Anyarin Terathananpat; Thanwa Suriyajak; Rinyarat Watchararojsiri; Chakkraphat Angsutanamalee; Chanakan Poonsiriwong
- Opening theme: "Tuberose" (Thai: ซ่อนกลิ่น) by Palmy
- Ending theme: "More Clearly" (Thai: ยิ่งชัดเจน) by Benyada Thawornset
- Country of origin: Thailand
- Original language: Thai
- No. of seasons: 1
- No. of episodes: 18

Production
- Producer: Chawalit Pongchaiyong
- Running time: 115 minutes
- Production companies: Bangkok Broadcasting & T.V. Co., Ltd; Prakotkarndee Co., Ltd

Original release
- Network: Channel 7; Bugaboo.TV (repeats)
- Release: May 26 – July 22, 2021

Lhong Klin Chan (Thai: หลงกลิ่นจันทน์, lit. 'enchanted by the scent of sandalwood') is a Thai TV series aired on Channel 7 from May 26 to July 22, 2021 on Wednesdays and Thursdays from 08:30 pm to 10:30 pm for 18 episodes.

== Storyline ==
Warnrak, a female investigator, gets transferred to Don Hinkab, her small hometown in order to investigate the homicide of Chankrapor, a local beautiful young woman who was murdered by mysterious serial killer named "Kattakorn Dokmai Chan" (ฆาตกรดอกไม้จันทน์, "sandalwood flower killer").

Warnrak meets Din, a local forensic pathologist and medical physician, who used to be her friend in childhood and often annoyed her, also teams up with her in order to find the murderer. Together with them is Trichai, a young and handsome police lieutenant, who is always ready to help.

The more they investigate, the riskier the mission when the murderer tries to get rid of all the witnesses and to reach her.

== Cast ==
Main

- Anyarin Terathananpat as Warnrak Satta (Warn)
- Thanwa Suriyajak as Pathapee (Din)
- Rinyarat Watchararojsiri as Sirinya (Chankrapor or Chan)
- Chakkraphat Angsutanamalee as Tangtai, troubled boy who try to investigate the death of Chan
- Chanakan Poonsiriwong as Trichai (Tee)

Supporting

- Jaturong Kolimart as Phana, police commander of Don Hinkab and Tangtai's uncle
- Sirilapas Kongtrakarn as Weluree (We), Phana's lover
- Pasathorn Songthawornthawee as Lau, male nurse, Warn and Din's friend
- Kittiya Jitpakdee as Jang, beauty salon owner, Warn and Din's friend
- Apisara Wongtassaneey as Namwhan, celebrity young woman who courts Din
- Kanin Puttamanunt as Tossaphum, young police, Warnrak's lover
- Chanapat Runghiranpraphakorn as Torsak (Kom), pub owner
- Phiphatphol Komaratat as Tawee, Don Hinkab headman, Weluree's father
- Chomwichai Meksuwan as Olarn, lawyer and Kom's friend
- Athiwat Sanitwong na Ayutthaya as Khomkrit, superior police, Warnrak's father
- Kanta Danao as Rattana, Warnrak's mother
- Surangkhana Sunthornphanawet as Pranee, Din's mother and Rattana's friend
- Thitinan Suwannasak as Suchart, Din's senior medical physician friend
- Weerachai Hattagowit as Kajorn, local politician
- Pongsanart Vinsiri as Jew, local trader
- Wittaya Jetaphai as Suphat, non-commissioned police of Don Hinkab, Warnrak's assistant
- Wassana Jeamchawee as Phen, Suphat's wife
- Narongsak Angkab as Yaem, non-commissioned police of Don Hinkab, Warnrak's assistant

Guest appearances

- Phenphet Phenkul as Phiphat, wealthy businessman, Chan's stepfather
- Kevlin Kortland as Patra, Phiphat's mistress, Chan's mother
- Trakarn Punthumlerdrujee as Pasin, former Don Hinkab mayor, Din's father
- Watsaporn Wattanakoon as Patcharee, TV host, Warn's friend
- Wayne Falconer as Somyos, influential politician, Namwhan's father
- Sawanee Utoomma as Maeying, medium
- Sasisawat Sutthikasem as Niti, late police who investigates the death of Chan
- Thanakorn Kittisap as Phat, local bus driver, one of Kattakorn Dokmai Chan's victims

== Production ==
Lhong Klin Chan is a TV series adaptation of the novel in the same title by Nichnita. It is the second series after Lilawadee Plerng in early 2015 that the two lead performers (Anyarin Terathananpat and Thanwa Suriyajak) joined together.

In addition, the series is also similar to Lilawadee Plerng, because they are in the same investigation genre, as well as produced by the same production crew. Although the two are not related at all.
