= 365 Wan Haeng Rak =

- Also known as: 365 Days of Love
- 365 วันแห่งรัก
- Directed by: Amaiporn Jitmaingong
- Starring: Theeradeth Wongpuapan; Ann Thongprasom; Louis Scott; Mira Komolwanich; Vorarit Fuangarome; Pakkaramai Potranan
- Country of origin: Thailand
- Original language: Thai
- No. of episodes: 14

Production
- Producer: Jariya Anfone
- Production location: Thailand
- Running time: Wednesday - Thursday

Original release
- Network: Channel 3
- Release: October 21 – December 8, 2010

365 Wan Haeng Rak (Thai: 365 วันแห่งรัก; RTGS: Sam Roi Hok Sip Ha Wan Haeng Rak; "365 Days of Love") is drama-romance lakorn that is aired on Channel 3. It stars Theeradeth Wongpuapan and Ann Thongprasom.This is the 5th lakorn that Ken and Ann had been in together.

== Synopsis ==
Tula or Toon (Theeradeth Wongpuapan) is the husband of Lanalee "Lan" (Ann Thongprasom). Tula is very confident in love for Lanalee, but for Lanalee not so much. Lanalee is described as bossy, self-centered, like her character in Sood Sanae Ha as Alin. One day Lanalee goes to a fortune teller or psychic and the psychic tells her that she and Tula will break up and Lanalee didn't believe it, so the psychic gave her an old notebook and instructs her to put it under her pillow when she sleeps and when she wake she'll find out that her divorce with Tula is true. For a while Lanalee is very depressed about the psychic's prediction, but as a result she put the notebook in her pillow and wakes up only to find out that a year ago she and Tula fought a lot where it ended up she packed her things up and move in into her mother's house.

== Actors 2010 ==
Year	2010
Broadcast station	Channel 3
Dramatis	Maker J (Makers Group) By Jariya Anfone
Television script	Nattiya Sirakornwilai, Benjawan
Directed	Ampaiporn Jitmaingong
The character	Main actor
Tula (Toon)	Theeradeth Wongpuapan
Lanaree (Lan)	Ann Thongprasom
Nawat (Wat)	Louis Scott (หลุยส์ สก๊อต)
Nidnicharn (Nid)	Oil Mira (มิรา โกมลวณิช)
Paweet (Weet) (Paratee Brother)	Not Vorarit Fuangarome (วรฤทธิ์ เฟื่องอารมย์)
Racha (Tula Ex girlfriend)	Pakkaramai Potranant (Tong) (ภัครมัย โปตระนันท์)
The character	Supporting Cast
Cheewin (Win) (Bali Father)	Ton Jakkrit Ammarat (จักรกฤษณ์ อำมรัตน์)
Ladawan (Da) (Bali Mather)	Panadda Wongphudee (ปนัดดา วงศ์ผู้ดี)
PoomPadin Rattapoom (Lanaree Ex husband)	Oat Worawut Niyomsup (วรวุฒิ นิยมทรัพย์)
Doctor Gan	Thitinun Suwansuk (ธิตินันท์ สุวรรณศักดิ์)
Tum (Ting and Tula Father)	Suprawat Phattamasud (สุประวัติ ปัทมสูต)
Laksamee (Lanaree and Ladawan Mather)	Duangta Toongkamanee (ดวงตา ตุงคะมณี)
Rawin	Rungruang Anantaya (Hack) (รุ่งเรือง อนันตยะ)
Paratee (Ti) (Lanaree Close friend)	Sripan Chinsomboon (ศรีพรรณ ชื่นชมบูรณ์)
Ting (Tula Sister)	Yanee Jongwisit (ญาณี จงวิสุทธิ์)
Bali (Li)	Felicia Natsana Butcher (เฟลิเซีย ณัฐษณา บุทเชอร์)
Juree (Office Mouse Partner)	Pajaree Na Nakorn (ปาจรีย์ ณ นคร)
Aim (Office Mouse Partner)	
Likhid (Lanaree and Ladawan Father)	
Nob (Tula master)	
The character	Invited actor
Lawin	Boriboon Chanrueng (บริบูรณ์ จันทร์เรือง)
Sutee Aingchaikhunphanid	Yai Sira Patrat (ศิระ แพทย์รัตน์)
Fortune teller	Penpak Sirikul (เพ็ญพักตร์ ศิริกุล)
News presenter	Chat-pa-wee Tree-chad-cha-wan-wong (ฉัตรปวีณ์ ตรีชัชวาลวงศ์)

== Theme music ==
Year	Song name	petition	Tune	Compile	Sing a song
2010	Kaub Koon Tee Mee Tur	Sarapee Sirisampan	Apichai Yenpunsuk	Apichai Yenpunsuk	Klear; Wasan Chotikul
2010	Mai Mee Krai Ruk Chun Dai Meuan Tur	Monawan Sriwichien	Ruengkid Yongpiyakun	Burin Supukkarapongkun	Myria Benedetti
2010	Mai Mee Krai Ruk Chun Dai Meuan Tur	Monawan Sriwichien	Ruengkid Yongpiyakun	Burin Supukkarapongkun	Panadda Ruengwut
2010	Tur Yung Ruk Chun Mai				Jakkavan Saotongyuiam Feat.Pakkaramai Potranan
2010	Rao Mee Rao	Niipong Honak	Asanee Chotikul		Titima Pratumtim Bellow Samid Arayasakun
2010	Tung Ruk Tung Nuai				Instinct

== Awards ==
2010 Top Awards

- Best Lakorn - 365 Wan Haeng Rak - Nominated
- Best Actress in a Lakorn - Ann Thongprasom - Nominated
- Best Actor in a Lakorn - Theeradeth Wonpuapan - Nominated
- Best Supporting Actor in a Lakorn - Worarit FuengArum - Nominated
- Best Supporting Actress in a Lakorn - Pakkaramai Protranan - Nominated
