= Sawan Biang (2008 TV series) =

- Also known as: Paradise Diversion
- Genre: Drama; Romance
- Based on: สวรรค์เบี่ยง by กฤษณา อโศกสิน (Kritsana Asoksin)
- Directed by: Amaiporn Jitmaingong
- Starring: Ken Theeradeth Wonpuapan; Ann Thongprasom; Natharika Thamapreedanan; Louis Scott; Janesuda Parnto
- Opening theme: Sin Sood Suk Tee by Panadda Ruengwut
- Ending theme: Jood On Kong Chan Yoo Tee Hua Jai by Aof Pongsak
- Country of origin: Thailand
- Original language: Thai
- No. of episodes: 12

Production
- Running time: 1450 minutes

Original release
- Network: Channel 3
- Release: March 27 – May 7, 2008

Sawan Biang (Thai: สวรรค์เบี่ยง) is a 2008 Thai TV series based on the same name novel of Krisna Asoksin, directed by Amaiporn Jitmaingong. Starring Ken Theeradeth Wonpuapan, Ann Thongprasom, Natharika Thamapreedanan, Louis Scott, Janesuda Parnto. This TV series aired on Channel 3.

== Cast ==
- Ken Theeradeth Wonpuapan as Kawee "Wee" Worawath - son of Khun Kid to his first wife, owing to his father having many wives after his mother's death he started to hate his father and turned into an arrogant cold guy who does not care about anyone, though he still remain good friends with Pat his ex-girlfriend and Sam. After meeting Narin he began to fall in love with her and brings back his kinder self though at first he just tries to blackmail and use Narin as a revenge to Leela, Narin's sister and his father's new wife who has a romantic feelings for him.
- Ann Thongprasom as Narin - the loving sister of Leela and the only one who tries to back talk and fight with Kawee, but after Kawee raped her and she is pregnant with their child, Narin distances herself from her family and tries not to worry them. As Kawee begins to pursue her and will change for her and their child, Narin begins to fall for Kawee's kinder nature.
- Natharika Thamapreedanan as Leela "Lee" - Worawath - Narin's elder sister and Khun Kid's new wife who harbors romantic feelings for Kawee and wanted revenge as well after Kawee embarrasses her in front of many people that led her into an accident. After knowing that Kawee uses her sister to get revenge she feels a little bit of jealousy towards Narin yet hated Kawee more for doing bad things to her sister eventually after knowing that Narin is pregnant with Kawee's child. At the end of the series she and Kawee reconcile and even helps him get back together with Narin.
- Louis Scott as Pawan "Tom"

=== Supporting cast ===
- Dilok Thong Wattana as Khun Kid Worawath - Kawee's father who despises him after having many wives
- Jane Janesuda Parnto as Patrapapa "Pat" - Kawee's ex-girlfriend who after breaking up with Kawee still remain friends with him and is often Kawee's savior during his hard times.
- Nithichai Yotamornsunthorn as Supajit "Sam" -

== Actors 2008 ==
Year	2008
Broadcast station	Channel 3
Dramatist	Lakornthai Co., Ltd.
Television script	Nattiya Sirakonwilai
Directed	Amaiporn Jitmaingong
The character	Main actor
Kawee Worawat (Wee)	Theeradej Wongpuapan
Narin Sophonrat (Rin)	Ann Thongprasom
Leela Sophonrat (Lee)	Natharika Thamapreedanan
Pawan (Tom)	Louis Scott
Patrapapa (Pat)	Jane Janesuda Parnto
The character	Supporting Cast
Supajit (Sam)	Nithichai YotAmornSunthorn (Yuan)
Pawa (Tuw)	Chotiros Kaewpinit (Sobee)
Kid Worawat (Kawee Father)	Dilok Thong wattana
Lawan Sophonrat (Leela Narin and Riemrid Mather)	Dientam Salitun (เดือนเต็ม สาลิตุล)
Wikrom	Mick Boromwuti Hiranyatithi
Yam	Pajaree Na Nakorn (ปาจรีย์ ณ นคร)
Noey	Thongthong Mokjok (ธงธง มกจ๊ก)
Lhamai	Mayuree Aisarasena Na Ayutthaya (มยุรี อิศรเสนา ณ อยุธยา)
Bunkeid	Nitid Riengsud (นิธิศ เรืองสุด)
Riemrid Sophonrat (Riem)	Kananek Tippawan (กัณฑ์เอนก ทิพวรรณ)
The character	Invited actor
Saowapa (Sao) (Pawa and Pawan Sister)	Sueangsuda Lawanprasert
Nunid (Sweetie Kawee)	Jern Warunya Charoenpornsirisuk (ณิชชาพัณณ์ ชุณหะวงศ์วสุ)
Fay (Sweetie Kawee)	Pang Panchanida Seesaamram (พรรณชนิดา ศรีสําราญ)
Jett (A couple Leela)	Thitinun Suwansuk (ธิตินันท์ สุวรรณศักดิ์)
lawyer	Yodchay Patsanee (ยอดชาย พัชนี)
The villagers	Sahaphum Totringsub (สหภูมิ โตตรึงทรัพย์)
The villagers	Opad Sudtipien (โอภาส สุทธิเพียร)
District office staff	Chinnatan TeinkittiPhong (ชินธันย์ เธียรกิตติพงษ์)
The villagers	Maneeyanan Limsawat (มณียานันท์ ลิ้มสวัสดิ์)
The villagers	Chalesoun Hanchana (ชเลศวร หาญชนะ)
Aunt landlord	Chongmad Plubpla (ช้องมาศ พลับพลา)
Chaophya Hospital Security	Piroad Nayplai (ไพโรจน์ น้อยพลาย)
Dortor Wumen	Wita Deeplangploy (วิตา ดีปลั่งพลอย)
Nurse	Kempon Sornsiriwong (เข็มพร ศรศิริวงศ์)
Dortor Men	Kridtapad Jantanapoti (กฤตภาส จันทนะโพธิ)

== Awards ==
Year	Award/Recognition	Category	Nominee	Result
2008	23rd Golden Television Awards	Outstanding Actor	Ken Theeradeth Wonpuapan	Won
2008	23rd Golden Television Awards	Outstanding Supporting Actor	Dilok Thong Wattana	Won
2008	23rd Golden Television Awards	Outstanding Director	Amaiporn Jitmaingong	Won
2008	23rd Golden Television Awards	Outstanding Actress	Ann Thongprasom	Nominated
2008	8th Top Awards	Best Director	Amaiporn Jitmaingong	Won
2008	8th Top Awards	Best Drama Series	Sawan Biang	Nominated
2008	8th Top Awards	Best Actor in a Drama Series	Ken Theeradeth Wonpuapan	Won
2008	8th Top Awards	Best Actress in a Drama Series	Ann Thongprasom	Won
2008	Siam Dara	Best Supporting Actress in a Drama Series	Natharika Thamapreedanan	Won
2008	Siam Dara	Best Actress in a Drama Series	Ann Thongprasom	Won
2008	Siam Dara	Best Actor in a Drama Series	Ken Theeradeth Wonpuapan	Won
2008	7th Star Entertainment Awards	Best Leading Actress	Ann Thongprasom	Won
2008	7th Star Entertainment Awards	Best Leading Actor	Ken Theeradeth Wonpuapan	Nominated
2008	6th Nation Awards	Wonderful Actor	Ken Theeradeth Wonpuapan	Won
2008	6th Hamburger Award	Best Supporting Actress	Natharika Thamapreedanan	Won
2008	Colorful Entertainment Award	Best Director	Amaiporn Jitmaingong	Won
2008	Colorful Entertainment Award	Best Drama Series	Sawan Biang	Won
2008	Colorful Entertainment Award	Best Actress	Ann Thongprasom	Won
2008	Colorful Entertainment Award	Best Actor	Ken Theeradeth Wonpuapan	Won
2008	TV Pool Awards	Best Drama Series of the Year	Sawan Biang	Won

== International broadcast ==
- This lakorn aired in Vietnam on THVL1 beginning April 29, 2016, under the title Thiên đường tội lỗi.

== Related Productions ==
See in Sawan Biang article.
