= Theeradej Wongpuapan =

Thai actor, model, and presenter (born 1977)

- ธีรเดช วงศ์พัวพันธ์
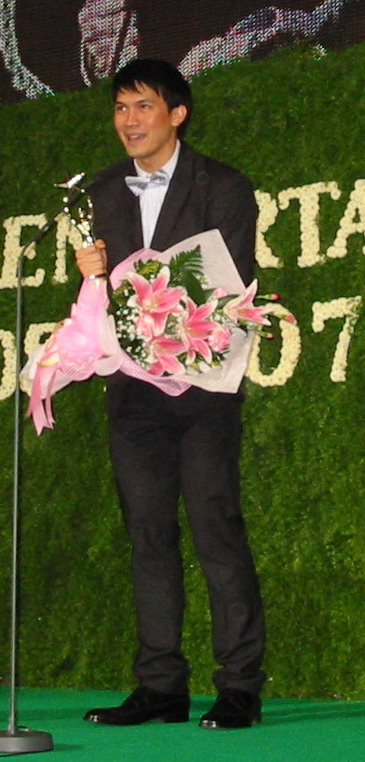
- Theeradej at Star Entertainment Awards 2007
- Born: Theeradej Wongpuapan; December 3, 1977 (age 48); Bangkok, Thailand
- Occupations: Actor; TV Host; presenter
- Years active: 1985–present
- Height: 184 cm (6 ft 0 in)
- Spouse: Butsakorn Pornwannasirivej (m. 2007)
- Children: 2
- Website: Official website

Theeradej Wongpuapan (Thai: ธีรเดช วงศ์พัวพันธ์, RTGS: Thiradet Wongphuaphan, nicknamed Kane; born December 3, 1977), is a Thai actor and presenter. His father, also an actor in Thailand, persuaded him to start his career in acting.

Theeradej is currently one of Thailand's most popular actors. He gained popularity after his work in the series called Song Rao Nirun Dorn. All his projects from that point on, TV dramas, movies and even TV commercials, have become popular among Thais.

According to the Suan Dusit poll, Theeradej was voted the most popular Thai male star six years in a row from 2006 to 2011 and was honored the Most Popular Star Hall of Fame in 2012, along with Thongchai McIntyre & Pachrapa Chaichua.

He received the Golden Television Awards for Best Leading Actor a record four times for his work in Ey Mah Lek (2002), Song Rao Nirun Dorn (2005), Sawan Biang (2008) and Sood Sanaeha (2009).

== Biography ==
Theeradej Wongpuapan is the youngest child of Weeraprawat Wongpuapan (his father) and Kanchana Wongpuapan (his mother). His father is a director and mother is a TV drama writer; her pseudonyms are Worapan Rawee, Leelawadee and Daeng Rawee.

He began acting at the suggestion of his father. In 1985, when he was seven years old, he appeared in The Six Siblings (หกพี่น้อง) on Channel 3, which was directed by his father. He next acted in the TV drama My Sweet Orange Tree (ต้นส้มแสนรัก) on Channel 3. He then stopped acting to attend เซนต์ดอมินิก School until he was in high school. Then, he shortly studied for his bachelor's degree at ABAC University before he went to study at the Brooks Institute of Photography in California, USA. He soon had to leave school, after two years of study, because of the 1997 Asian financial crisis. He returned to Thailand to be a model, presenter, and actor in TV Drama, movies, and music video. He appeared in Super Luk Toong on Channel 9 1998, followed by Queen of Luk Toong Pumpuang Duangjan (ราชินีลูกทุ่ง พุ่มพวง ดวงจันทร์) on Channel 7 in 1999, and The Ridiculous Battle (ฝนตกขี้หมูไหลคนอะไรมาพบกัน) on Channel 3 in 2000.

Ken was known extensively and popularly from "Eternal Love" ("สองเรานิรันดร") played with "Phiyada Akkaraseranee", "Chain of Love" ("อุ้มรัก") and "Paradise Diversion" ("สวรรค์เบี่ยง") with "Ann Thongprasom". The approximate rating from "นีลเส็น" of "Paradise Diversion" was 14.6; the finale was 18.7.

In "2009", he came back to play on "Bangkok Traffic Love Story" ("รถไฟฟ้ามาหานะเธอ") which was the most gaining profits movie in 2009, 145.5 million baht.

Ken was appointed to be a special Thai ambassador of "UNICEF" ("2008" – present) and a presenter of “"White Ribbon Year Project"” which campaigning the violence to children, feminine, and families. This is a project of the "Developing Social and Stability of Humans Ministry of Thailand" ("2010").

Ken Theeradej Wongpuapan's #1 leading female onscreen is Ann Thongprasom #1 Pra'nangs.

== Personal life ==
Theeradej married "Noi" Boosakorn Pornwannasiriwej, a popular Thai actress, on October 25, 2007. Queen Sirikit participated in the ceremony. On August 17, 2008, Noi gave birth to their first child, a boy named "Khun" Khunatum Wongpuapan. Their second child, a son named "Jun" Thippatai Wongpuapan, was born on July 4, 2010.

Theeradej's hobbies are making short films, taking pictures, naturist traveling, collecting antique watches and furniture. Basketball is his favorite sport.

== Image ==
Theeradej is in a popular actor. In the annual Suan Dusit polls from 2006 to 2010, he was voted the most popular Thai celebrity; in 2009, he received 77% of the vote. He was also voted the most popular Thai actor in the 2009 ABAC poll, with 38.1% of the vote.

Suan Dusit Poll - "Best of The Year"

- No.3 Most Popular Thai Male Star (2005) : 23.80%
- No.1 Most Popular Thai Male Star (2006) : 38.57%
- No.1 Most Popular Thai Male Star (2007) : 53.50%
- No.1 Most Popular Thai Male Star (2008) : 69.20%
- No.1 Most Popular Thai Male Star (2009) : 73.16%
- No.1 Most Popular Thai Male Star (2010) : 76.98%
- No.1 Most Popular Thai Male Star (2011) : 40.28%
- People's Choice Most Popular Star Honor (Suan Dusit Poll Most Popular Star Hall of Fame) (2012), along with Thongchai McIntyre & Pachrapa Chaichua.

- TV3 Fanclub Award is a favour survey award for actors, actress, and TV Programmes on Channel 3 via voting in www.thaitv3.com

== Filmography ==
=== Film ===
Year	Title	Role	Notes
2000	Go-Six	Plub	
2001	Behind the Painting	Nopporn	
2004	Be True	Max	
2007	The Office	Theeradj	Short Film
2009	Bangkok Traffic Love Story	Loong	
2018	The Pool	Day	
2019	Heartbeat	Chai	
2025	Everybody Loves Me When I'm Dead	Toh	Netflix film

=== Dramas ===
Year	Title	Role	Network	Notes
1985	Hok Pee Nong		Channel 3	
1986	Ton Som Saen Ruk	Saen	Channel 3	
1998	Super Look Toong	Thep	Channel 9	Support Role
1999	Pumpuang	Kraisorn Saenganan [Pumpuang's husband]	Channel 7	Lead Role
2000	Fon Tok Kee Moo Lai Kon Arai Ma Pob Gun	Puerk Bangsue	Channel 3	Lead Role
2000	Kon Kong Pandin	Panu [Thai Embassy Secretary]	Channel 3	Lead Role
2001	Seur 11 Tua	Cap. Pongphet Phupan / SuaDao [Leapord]	Channel 3	Lead Role
2001	Raeng Ngao	Veekit	Channel 3	Lead Role
2002	Plae Kao	Kwan	Channel 3	Lead Role
2002	Ai Ma Lek	Fah / Ma Lek	Channel 3	Lead Role
2003	Trab Fah Sin Dao Sao Kae		Channel 3	Guest Appearance
2003	Prajun San Gon	Tie Pitakwong	Channel 3	Lead Role
2004	Ruk Sood Fah Lah Sood Lok	Jack	Channel 3	Lead Role
2005	Neung Nai Suang	Anawat Patcharapojanart (Neung)	Channel 3	Lead Role
2005	Song Rao Nirandorn	Issara Kriangkrai	Channel 3	Lead Role
2006	Sai Sueb Sai Sadeu	Police Captain Chartchai Fuangfoo	Channel 3	Lead Role
2006	Oum Rak	Rachain "Chen"	Channel 3	Lead Role
2007	Ruk Tur Took Wan	Watin "Tin"	Channel 3	Lead Role
2007	Ruk Nee Hua Jai Rao Jaung	Puwanai "Pu"/Tuwapu	Channel 3	Lead Role
2007	Sueb Lub Rahat Ruk	Police Captain Anon	Channel 3	Lead Role
2008	Sawan Biang	Kawee "Wee" Warrawat	Channel 3	Lead Role
2008	Jai Rao	Korrawik "Wik" Pisuttada	Channel 3	Lead Role
2009	Sood Sanae Ha	Din Pasu Boriban/Kru Cook	Channel 3	Lead Role
2010	Wiwa Wawoon	Pawee "Wee" Sajjapongpan	Channel 3	Lead Role
2010	365 Wun Haeng Rak	Tula Tientada "Tun"	Channel 3	Lead Role
2011	Rahat Torrachon	Singha "Sing"	Channel 3	Lead Role
2011	Kon Ruk Luang Jai	Ran Singhaboworndej	Channel 3	Lead Role
2012	Ruk Khun Tao Fah	Theera "Thee"	Channel 3	Lead Role
2013	Majurat See Nam Pueng	Pat Patamakun	Channel 3	Lead Role
2013	Kon Ruk Strawberry	Dr. Saen "Saen" Pueannadee	Channel 3	Lead Role
2015	Luerd Mungkorn: Seur	Tham	Channel 3	Guest appearance
2015	Luerd Mungkorn: Sing	Tham	Channel 3	Guest appearance
2015	Luerd Mungkorn: Krating	Chonlathee/Tham	Channel 3	Lead Role
2015	Luerd Mungkorn: Raed	Tham	Channel 3	Guest appearance
2015	Luerd Mungkorn: Hong	Tham	Channel 3	Guest appearance
2015	Nang Rai Tee Rak	Theeradej Wongpuapan	Channel 3	Guest appearance
2017	Kammathep Hunsa	Peem Techadamrongkul	Channel 3	Guest appearance
2017	Kamathep Ork Suek	Peem Techadamrongkul	Channel 3	Guest appearance
2017	Kamathep Online	Peem Techadamrongkul	Channel 3	Guest appearance
2017	Loob Korn Kammathep	Peem Techadamrongkul	Channel 3	Guest appearance
2017	Sorn Ruk Kammathep	Peem Techadamrongkul	Channel 3	Guest appearance
2017	Kammathep Sorn Kol	Peem Techadamrongkul	Channel 3	Guest appearance
2017	Kammathep Jum Laeng	Peem Techadamrongkul	Channel 3	Guest appearance
2017	Kamathep Prab Marn	Peem Techadamrongkul	Channel 3	Lead Role
2017	Ra Rerng Fai	Shahkrit Pitchakorn / "Krit"	Channel 3	Lead Role
2018	Mee Piang Rak	Thanadon Suthakorn / "Don"	Channel 3	Lead Role
2021	Ruk Nirun Juntra	Thatcher	Channel 3	Lead Role
2021	Duang Ta Tee Sam		Channel 3	Guest appearance
TBA	Suptar 2550	Ryu	Channel 3	Lead Role

=== Theatre ===
Year	Title	With
2010	เคนลี่กะก๊วนขี้เล่น	Cris Horwang & Willy McIntosh

== Awards ==
2002

1. Best Leading Actor (Ai Ma Lek) from the 17th Golden Television Awards

2005

1. Best Leading Actor (Song Rao Nirun Dorn) from the 20th Golden Television Awards

2. Best Leading Actor (Song Rao Nirun Dorn) from Star Entertainment Awards 2005

3. Best Leading Actor (Song Rao Nirun Dorn) from Top Awards 2005

2006

1. Best Leading Actor (Oum Ruk) from Star Entertainment Awards 2006

2. Best Leading Actor (Oum Ruk) from Top Awards 2006

2008

1. Best Leading Actor (Sawan Bieng) from the 23rd Golden Television Awards

2. Best Leading Actor (Sawan Bieng) from Top Awards 2008

3. Best Leading Actor (Sawan Bieng) from Siamdara Stars Party 2008

4. Best Leading Actor (Sawan Bieng) from SeeSan Bunteaung Awards 2008

5. Best Leading Actor (Jai Rao) from Hamburger Awards 2008

2009

1. Best Leading Actor (Sood Sanaeha) from the 24th Golden Television Awards

2. Best Leading Actor (Sood Sanaeha) from the 1st Nattaraja Awards

3. Best Leading Filmography Actor (Bangkok Traffic Love Story) from Top Awards 2009

4. Best Leading TV Drama Actor (Sood Sanaeha from Khuanjai Seu Top Awards 2009

5. Best Leading Filmography Actor (Bangkok Traffic Love Story) from Kwanjai Seu MuanChon 2009

6. Best Leading TV Drama Actor (Sood Sanaeha) from Kwanjai Seu MuanChon 2009

2010

1. Best Actor in a Lakorn (365 Wun Haeng Rak) from Top Awards 2010 - Nominated

2. Best Actor in a Lakorn (Wiwa Wah Woon) from Top Awards 2010 - Nominated
