= Sawan Biang =

Sawan Biang (สวรรค์เบี่ยง) is a 1970 novel by Krisna Asoksin is about a young innocent woman named Narin who find herself a victim of lecherous stepson of her sister. The novel was serialized in Mae Sri Ruen magazine between 1965-1967 and was adapted by a movie, a television play and four television series.

== Plot ==
When Narin's sister Leela lost her fiancée, she was visited by a rich businessman named Worawat who was a widower and a single dad to his son Kawee. Kawee was a spoiled man as well as a ladies' man who happen to be Leela's high school crush. Realizing their loss of loved ones, they formed a bond and decided to marry. This caused a shock to her mother and Narin. After their marriage Leela and her family moved to Worawat's mansion despite Kawee's hatred for Leela who he thought was trying to replace his late mother. So he planned Narin as doll. Following his father's death, he tried to kidnap her. Kawee ended up raping Narin. Silenced by rape Narin decided to leave the mansion and Kawee was kicked out of his father's will which now belonged to Leela. Kawee was shocked when he saw Narin was pregnant.

Kawee is about to go abroad to finish his studies his best friend Sam throws him a going away party and invites all the classmates. Leela has had a crush on Kawee for a long time and goes to the party and brings Kawee flowers, when Kawee sees Leela he looks at her with disdain. Leela tries to give the flowers to Kawee who then tell her that he does not take flowers form poor people and asks her why she is at his party. Sam tells him he invited everyone to the party, Kawee insults Leela tells her that she doesn't deserve to attend his party he really insults her in front of her all her classmates that are now laughing at her. Leela starts crying and runs off, Narin is Leelas younger sister hears every word of Kawee's insult and runs after her sister. Not looking where she was running, Leela gets hit by a car is taken to the hospital and is badly injured but survives. From that day Narin hates Kawee for hurting her sister and causing Leela to get injured. Kawee is a huge snob thinking people who do not have money are beneath him.

Three years later Kawee returns after completing his MBA and is now ready to work with his father Kit at his company. Kawee's stepmother wants to throw him a welcome home party and is overseeing the construction of a floral wreath. Kawee hates his step mother because he thinks she is a gold digger and is not worthy of his father Kit. She doesn't hate Kawee she mostly feels sorry for him because he lost his mom at a young age and his father neglectful. After Kawee's mother dies his father Kit wanted to find a new mother for him but all his marriages have all either ended in death or divorce, Kawee feel like his father doesn't love him because he never tried to be a real father after Kawee's mother died. Kit seemed to only be concerned with his own happiness by finding new wives after each wife he marries leaves him or dies he is now married to his seventh wife. So Kawee sees his step mother and the florist decorating the entrance with a welcome home wreath in red roses because he hates his step mother he tells her that he wants it changed from red to yellow. To which the florist tell him that she will not be able to get yellow roses on such short notice. Kawee tells her that he is the boss and a servant like her shouldn't speak directly to him. The florist tells Kawee to "shove is up his butt" but with the real curse words she insult his intelligence and character then takes her assistance and leaves, then Sam tells Kawee that the florist that just insulted him is none other than Leela's younger sister Narin. When she gets back to the flower shop where she works the assistances think that the owner will definitely fire her but he doesn't due to the fact that he likes her even though he is married.

That night at the party Kawee gets drunk and gets into a fight with a guest at the party Kit Kawee's father yells at him and hits him, kit is very upset and he starts feeling chest pain. His wife wants to take him to the hospital but he convinces her that he just needs a bit of rest so they leave to drive home. At this point we see Leela in a bridle shop picking out wedding favors with her fiancé Mark for their wedding in a week. After her accident she wanted to forget about Kawee she finished university with a degree in business management and now works as secretary for Kawee's fathers company. Mark and Leela finish from the bridle shop and get on his motorcycle to go home. On the way they get hit by a car, Mark dies instantly and the passenger of the other vehicle also dies. Leela is injured and unconscious the driver of the car is injured but able to call an ambulance. At the hospital Leela has internal injuries and head trauma she survives but is in a coma the driver of the car only has a few bumps and bruises but fine and is identified as Kawee's father Kit; his wife died instantly her brother and sister Tom and Kelly are at the hospital taking care paperwork for their dead sister Kit's wife. While at the hospital Narin goes to the vending machine for a drink it gets stuck and Tom gets it out for her. Tom finds Narin very beautiful and instantly fall for her, Narin thanks him for getting her soda and leaves to go back to her younger brother David and their mom who are in Leela's room waiting for her to wake up from her coma.

Leela wakes up after four days asking for Mark but her family tells her that she can see him later, the doctors told her family not to tell her that Mark died because the news may cause her to go into shock. Kit feels guilty for causing Mark's death after arranging his wife's funeral goes to see Leela and tells her that he is very sorry about Mark. Her mother wakes in and hears Kit talking to Leela about Mark and now must tell Leela that Mark has died. Out of his guilt Kit then pays all of Leela's hospital bills. Wanting to say goodbye for the last time to Mark she begs the doctors to allow her to attend her fiancé's funeral. Kit wants to take Leela and her family to Mark's funeral and also to pay his own respects to Mark and his family. After Marks funeral Kit feeling guilty starts to visit Leela at the hospital and tell her that his wife also died to which Leela asks to go to her funeral too. At Kawee's step mothers funeral he sees Leela enter with his father and her family, Kawee again insults Leela telling her and her family that they don't belong at a "high society" funeral and to leave. Kit tells Kawee to stuff it and that he wants them there and that is Kawee does not want her there he needs to leave Kawee gets angry tells his father that he is again choosing others over himself and storms off. Leela stays in the hospital for three weeks and is visited by Kit everyday. After Leela goes home Kit tells her that he would like to get to know her better and they start dating.

Kit and Leela date for a few months and one night Kawee is at the same restaurant that Kit has taken Leela. Kawee sees them and asks his father why he is with Leela, Kit tells him that he loves her and wants to marry her to this Leela is surprised but says nothing. Kawee starts yelling at Kit about how Leela is just using him for his money and to get his attention because she has been in love with him since high school. To which Leela says that she may have has a crush on him then but she is way over him and loves Kit now Kawee calls her a gold digger sees a necklace around her neck and gets really angry because he thinks it looks like one his mother wore when she was alive. Kit tells Kowee that it's not his mother's necklace that he bought that for Leela and he wouldn't give anyone else her jewelry. People at the restaurant start to look at them and start asking if Leela really is a gold digger thinking Kawee is right and looking out for his father, embarrassed Leela runs out and Kit goes after her. She tell Kit that maybe they should stop seeing each other he manages to convince her not to stop seeing him that he doesn't care what Kawee and other people think that he loves her and really wants to marry her. After thinking Leela decides to marry Kit because she does have feelings for Kit but more because she wants to be closer to Kawee she thinks if she is ear him maybe he will Like her back 8 ( she is still in love with him even though she was going to get married, when her fiancé died she thought that maybe she could win over Kawee).

Leela decides to marry Kit and they sign a marriage certificate, Kit tells Leela that she and her family can move in with him as soon as they want.

== Film, TV or theatrical adaptations ==
=== 1970 film ===
The first adaptation of the novel was released in 1970. The film was directed by Adul Dulyarat under the pseudonym Adisorn, screenplay by Polrob Nopadol and produced by Wichian Sa-nguanthai and Ladda Prathapsing.

The film was screened at the Empire Theatre near Pak Khlong Talat on July 3rd 1970; it was shot on 16mm color film and featured live voice-over narration during the screening.

Casts

- Petchara Chaowarat as Narin
- Mitr Chaibancha as Kawee
- Metta Rungrat as Leela
- Somkuan Krachangsart as Khun Kid
- Prachuap Ruekyamdee as Pawan
- Prim Praphaporn as Pat

=== 1971 television play ===
In 1971, the television play series based on Krisna Asoksin's novel was released. The play series was produced by the Suphabsatri Troupe led by Ramyong Sakhonphan, screenplay by Subha Devakul. The series was produced in the studio at Bang Khun Phrom Palace as a live performance and was broadcast live on Thai Television Channel 4.

Casts

- Nanthawan Mekyai as Narin
- Sayan Chantharawibun as Kawee
- Metta Rungrat as Leela
- Suprawat Pattamasoot as Pawan

Prior to the start of production, Pinyo Thongchua was originally cast in the role of Kawee but the replacement was made after an accident left him with broken arm, rendering him unable to perform.

=== 1978 television series ===
In 1978, the television series based on Krisna Asoksin's novel was produced by Ari Nakdontree who also directed the female casts while Kantharee Simasathien directed the male casts. It was produced in the studio at Bang Lamphu and aired on Thai Color Television Channel 9 every Monday to Friday from 18:20 PM to 18:50 PM.

- Dueantem Salitul as Narin
- Atsawin Rattanapracha as Kawee
- Sukonthip Senawong as Leela
- Phusit Aphiman as Pawan

This adaptation gained immense popularity, attracted a large number of advertisers that the audience complained to the station by phone about the imbalance in airtime between the commercials and the series. This prompted the National Telecommunication Commission to establish regulations capping the length of advertisements.

=== 1988 television series ===
In 1988 adaptation, the series was directed by Manop Sammabat. It aired on Channel 7 from Friday to Sunday; 9:00 PM - 10:15 PM on Friday to Saturday and 9:15 PM to 10:30 PM on Sunday.

Casts

- Monrudee Yamaphai as Narin
- Yuranunt Pamornmontri as Kawee
- Naowarat Yuktanan as Leela
- Pairoj Jaisingha as Khun Kid
- Maneenuch Smerasut as Pat

=== 1998 television series ===
In 1998, the novel was adapted as a television series and was the second time to aired on Channel 7, every Friday to Sunday from 8:20 PM to 10:00 PM.

Casts

- Suvanant Kongying as Narin
- Danuporn Punnakun as Kawee
- Buntharik Tasnarom as Leela
- Pamela Bowden as Pat

=== 2008 television series ===
- Ann Thongprasom as Narin
- Theeradej Wongpuapan as Kawee
