= Chaloey Sak =

Thai novel written by Duang Dao

Chaloey Sak (เชลยศักดิ์)
- Author: Duang Dao
- Language: Thai
- Publication date: 1956
- Publication place: Thailand

Chaloey Sak (Thai: เชลยศักดิ์, pronounced [t͡ɕʰa˦˥.lɤːj sak̚], lit: "honorable prisoner") is a Thai novel written by Duang Dao. It was first serialised between 1956 and 1957 in Daily Mail Wanchan Weekly Magazine. It was first published as a book by Ruamsan Publishing, with the first to fifth printings between 1967 and 1994.

== Synopsis ==
Lieutenant Yothin Asawarat is a war hero from WWII, he was recognized for his involvement in the Free Thai movement during the war. Yothin has a bright future ahead of him and is engaged to Piromya, the daughter of a minister. Things turn bad for Yothin when his father Phraya Sawamipak Warat encounter financial problems in his shipping business. When Phraya Sawamipak's company was in turmoil, Atisak Santatiwong, a businessman, took the opportunity to buy stock from the company. He offered Phraya Sawamipak money to fund the company in lieu of Yothin being his prisoner for one year at his home in Mon Pha Luang to take revenge on his family for slandering their family name years back. Atisak's younger sister Alisa is in love with Jao Kwan Fah, a womanising prince from a neighboring county and is in charge of supervising Yothin, their prisoner.

== Adaptation ==
The novel has been adapted several times, both into a film and a television drama of the same title, as follows

- Chaloey Sak (1959) – film starring Amara Asavananda as Alisa
- Chaloey Sak (1981) – film starring Toon Hiranyasap as Yothin Asawarat, Nirut Sirichanya as Jao Kwan Fah, Penpak Sirikul
- Chaloey Sak (1991) – 39 episode TV drama on Channel 7 starring Likit Ekmongkol as Yothin Asawarat, Chintara Sukapatana as Alisa, Sombat Methanee as minister
- Chaloey Sak (2010) – 27 episode TV drama on Channel 3 starring Atshar Nampan as Yothin Asawarat, Ann Thongprasom as Alisa, Dom Hetrakul as Atisak

For the 1991 version, it is considered the best version and is remembered by contemporaries. In addition, the opening theme (first version) with the same title as the drama was also popular. While the 2010 version was air on China's Jiangsu Broadcasting Corporation (JSBC) in 2013, starting February 16 at 10:00 pm (CST).

== See more ==
- Thai royal ranks and titles
