= Sapai Glai Peun Tiang =

- Also known as: Underdeveloped Daughter-in-Law
- สะใภ้ไกลปืนเที่ยง
- Written by: Piyaporn Wayuparb
- Directed by: Kritsada Techanilobon
- Starring: Chakrit Yamnam; Ann Thongprasom
- Opening theme: Confirm Huajai Wa Chai Ter by Earn the Star
- Ending theme: Kwam On Air by Anuwat Sanguansakpakdee
- Country of origin: Thailand
- Original language: Thai
- No. of episodes: 13

Production
- Production location: Thailand
- Running time: Monday - Tuesday

Original release
- Network: Channel 3
- Release: April 20 – June 1, 2009

Sapai Glai Peun Tiang (Underdeveloped Daughter-in Law) is a Thai drama produced by Channel 3 and stars Chakrit Yamnam and Ann Thongprasom.

== Synopsis ==
Sapai Glai Peun Tiang revolves around a hot-headed cop named Lalin (Ann Thongprasom)

== Cast ==
- Chakrit Yamnam as Jormtup
- Ann Thongprasom as Lalin/Prik
- Akkaphan Namart as Pat
- Kanya Rattanapetch as Nampetch
- Chintara Sukapatana
