= Ghastly Dorm =

- Film poster
- Directed by: Komsan Treepong
- Written by: Bhandit Rittakol
- Produced by: Bhandit Rittakol
- Starring: Santisuk Promsiri; Chintara Sukapatana; Kiat Kitjaroen; Ann Thongprasom; Krit Sukramongkon; Warut Woratham
- Production company: Five Star Production
- Distributed by: Five Star Production
- Release date: 30 January 1992
- Running time: 118 minutes
- Country: Thailand
- Language: Thai

Ghastly Dorm (Thai: หอ.หึๆ, หอ หึ หึ or Hor Hue Hue, lit. 'Heh heh dorm') is a 1992 Thai comedy horror film produced and written by Bhandit Rittakol (uncredited in IMDb).

In the film, World War II-era ghosts are haunting a modern college dorm. When the students attempt an exorcism, the ghosts have a negative reaction.

== Plot ==
A college dorm is haunted by ghosts from WWII, when the building was a hospital. They are evil and responsible for taking care of valuables. Chaos arises when the students try to perform an exorcism.

== Cast ==
- Santisuk Promsiri as Chaithong
- Chintara Sukapatana as Teacher Ladda
- Wachara Pan-Iom as Somprasong
- Kiat Kitjaroen as Boriboon
- Arun Pawilai as Yindee
- Warut Woratham as Nammon
- Ann Thongprasom as Sawittree
- Anchalee Chaisiri as Rector
- Sulaleewan Suwanatat as Master Thomya
- Jukrit Ammarat as Ghost of Commander
- Krit Sukramongkon

== Release ==
It released on 30 January 1992 in nationwide theatres and aired on Channel 7 on 10 June 2013 at 8:00 a.m.

== Adaptation ==
The film was adapted into a TV drama of the same name on Channel 3, broadcast every weekday from 6:30 to 8:00 p.m. in 2011 (after evening news: first edition) for a total of 16 episodes. It starred Vorarit Fuangarome, Jomkwan Leelapongprasuth, Nattaraht Maurice Legrand, Chaleumpol Tikumpornteerawong, Isariya Saisanan.
