= The Letter (2004 film) =

Thai romance-drama film

- Theatrical poster
- Directed by: Pa-oon Chantarasiri
- Written by: Kongdej Jaturanrasamee
- Produced by: Duangkamol Limcharoen; Nonzee Nimibutr; Somsak Techaratanaprasert
- Starring: Anne Thongprasom; Attaporn Teemakorn
- Cinematography: Naruepol Chokkanapitaks
- Edited by: Patamanadda Yukol
- Music by: Boyd Kosiyabong; Chartchai Pongprapapan
- Distributed by: Sahamongkol Film International
- Release date: 24 June 2004
- Running time: 109 minutes
- Country: Thailand
- Language: Thai

The Letter (Thai: เดอะเลตเตอร์ จดหมายรัก or Jod mai rak, literally "love letter") is a 2004 romance-drama film directed by Pa-oon Chantarasiri. It is a remake of Pyeon ji, a 1997 South Korean film by director Lee Jung-gook.

== Plot ==
Dew (Anne Thongprasom) is a young computer programmer who meets Ton (Attaporn Teemakorn) in Chiang Mai during her distant cousin's funeral. They immediately become attracted to each other and start to date each other over the phone.

Back in Bangkok on Valentine's Day, Dew refuses to accompany her best friend, Ked, on a blind date because she is anxiously waiting for Ton's phone call. The consequence of this breaks Dew's heart as her friend is murdered by the blind date.

Dew immediately leaves for Chiang Mai and finds comfort in Ton. The two start a serious relationship and marry soon after. However, their newfound happiness is cut short when Ton dies of a brain tumor. Dew is again left alone.

Before leaving for Bangkok, she receives a mysterious letter, seemingly from her dead husband. As it turns out, Ton had written a series of letters prior to his death and arranged for them to be sent after his death to his widow. The letters help Dew through her grief. She finally is able to live without the love of her life and continues to live in Chiang Mai with their son, born after the death of his father.

== Production and release ==
The Letter was the last film produced by Duangkamol Limcharoen before she died on December 8, 2003, at age thirty-nine. Director Pa-oon Chantarasiri, making her first feature film, agreed to take on the project, as a favor to her producer-friend.

Starring popular Thai soap opera actress Anne Thongprasom, the film was a hit at the local box office. Facial tissues were handed out in front of cinemas for free in anticipation of the audiences' reactions to the final scenes.

"It's an effective melodrama, a movie of well-executed cliches and retro sensibilities," wrote Bangkok Post film critic King Rithdee. "But only Anne's performance—especially her ability to switch on a fountain of tears—conceals the insubstantial nature of the film's build-up and its banal, I-love-you-forever kind of dialogue. Don't forget to bring a handkerchief. Or better still, a towel."

Variety critic Russell Edwards called the film "slow-moving" and "glossy." "[It] doesn't just tug on the heartstrings but uses them to drop anchor in a sea of schmaltz."

== Festivals and awards ==
Anne Thongprasom won for Best Actress at the Thailand National Film Association Awards. The film also won for Best Original Song, "Mai Mee Chai Mai," by Chartchai Pongprapapan.

The Letter was screened at the 2004 Pusan International Film Festival.
