= Nam-nguen Boonnak =

Thai actress (1940–2026)

- น้ำเงิน บุญหนัก
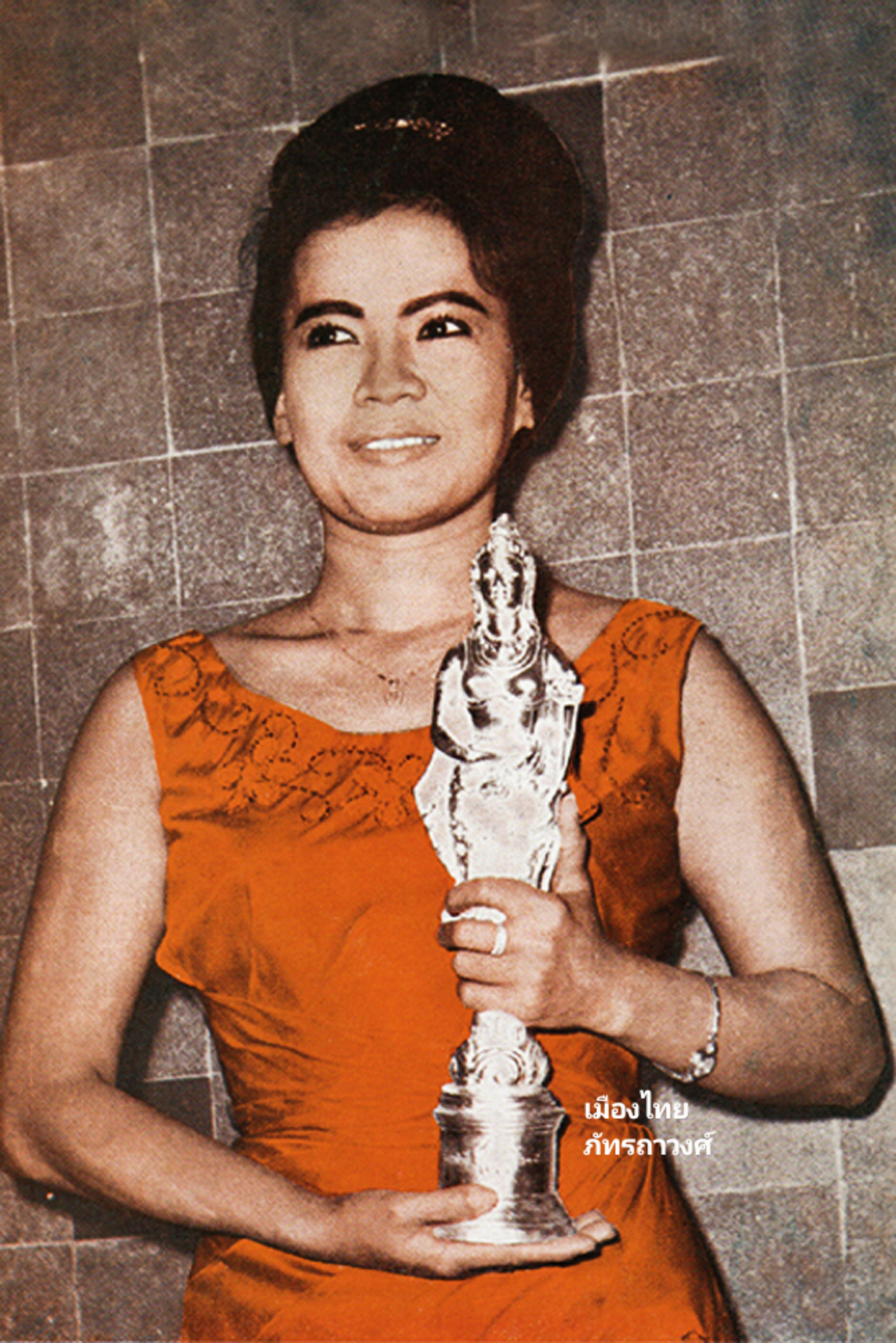
- Born: Sawong Jaruwijit; 24 January 1940; Bangkok, Thailand
- Died: 8 July 2026 (aged 86)
- Other name: Peak (เปี๊ยก)
- Occupations: Actress; voice actress
- Years active: 1955–2026
- Notable work: Krasue Yaisai in Krasue TV series on Ch7 (1994)

Nam-nguen Boonnak (Thai: น้ำเงิน บุญหนัก, RTGS: Namngoen Bunnak, pronounced [nám.ŋɤ̄n būn.nàk]; 24 January 1940 – 9 July 2026) was a Thai actress.

== Life and career ==
Nam-nguen Boonnak was born as Sawong Jaruwijit (สวง จารุวิจิตร; nickname: Peak เปี๊ยก) on 24 January 1940 in Bangkok. Her grandfather had the title of Phraya as a playwright who worked closely with King Rama VI. Her father worked in the Royal Irrigation Department and her mother was of Chinese descent.Her family roots are from Suphan Buri.

Boonnak entered the entertainment industry at the age of 17 by following her friends to see a concert by the Air Force Band at Thung Maha Mek. She was invited by an elder in the showbiz, so she immediately starred in her first movie in 1955, without having to go through an audition or study acting like today.

She won the best supporting actress award at the 1965 Saraswati Awards for Nang Sao Phoradok (นางสาวโพระดก), and again in 1966 for Ka Wao (กาเหว่า).

Boonnak starred alongside legendary performers Mitr Chaibancha and Petchara Chaowarat. She was also very close to Chaibancha.

She is well recognized by her role as Yai Sai (ยายสาย), a krasue in the 1994 TV series Krasue (กระสือ), and role as Clark's mother in Monrak luk thung (มนต์รักลูกทุ่ง) in 1995, the remake of 1970 movie in the same title. She also provided the Thai voice for the Grandmother Willow in the animated film Pocahontas in the same year.

In later years Boonnak was well-acquainted with being a supporting character in many television series, usually roles as servants or grandmothers.

In the early 2017, she received the lifetime achievement award at the 31st TVG Awards.

Boonnak died on 9 July 2026, at the age of 86.

== Filmography ==
=== Film ===
Year	Title	Role	Notes
1965	Nang Sao Phoradok (นางสาวโพระดก)		
1966	Ka Wao (กาเหว่า)		

=== Television dramas ===
Year	Title	Role	Production company	Network	Notes
1994	Krasue (กระสือ)	Sai (สาย)	Dara VDO Company Limited	Channel 7	
1995	Monrak luk thung (มนต์รักลูกทุ่ง)	Clark's mother (แม่ของคล้าว)	Dara VDO Company Limited	Channel 7	
2022	The Miracle of Teddy Bear (คุณหมีปาฏิหาริย์)	Mathanee (มทนี คนึงนิจ)	THANAD LAKORN	Channel 3	Cameo
2022	Fah Pieng Din (ฟ้าเพียงดิน)		The One Enterprise		Cameo
2022	Bad Romeo (คือเธอ)	Namthong (น้ำทอง)	Thong Entertainment	Channel 3	Cameo
