= Krisna Asoksin =

Thai writer

- กฤษณา อโศกสิน
- Born: Sukanya Cholasuek (สุกัญญา ชลศึกษ์); November 27, 1931 (age 94)
- Citizenship: Thailand
- Occupation: Thai novelist

Sukanya Cholasuek (Thai: สุกัญญา ชลศึกษ์, born 1931), (Note: RTGS: Sukanya Chonlasuek) writing under the pen name Krisna Asoksin, (Note: Thai: กฤษณา อโศกสิน, also spelled Asokesin, RTGS: Kritsana Asoksin) is a Thai novelist. She has written about 150 novels and many other short stories. Her 1980 novel Poon Pid Thong (ปูนปิดทอง) won the S.E.A. Write Award in 1985, and she was named National Artist in literature in 1988. Most of her early work has been described as "domestic drama", while her more recent output has taken on social and political themes. Many of her novels have been adapted as well-known Thai television soap operas, each with multiple remakes, including Namphueng Khom, Mia Luang and Sawan Biang.

== Bibliography ==
This bibliography is organized as follows: Thai name (RTGS transcription, name translation; years of publishing).

=== Books under the pen name Krisna Asoksin ===
- น้ำผึ้งขม (Namphueng Khom, Bitter Honey; 1964-1968)
- ระฆังวงเดือน (Rakhang Wong Duean, Crescent-shaped Bell; 1964-1968) (the sequel of น้ำผึ้งขม)
- สวรรค์เบี่ยง (Sawan Biang, Heaven's Deviation; 1965-1967)
- วิมานไฟ (Wiman Fai, Mansion of Fire; 1967-1968)
- น้ำเซาะทราย (Nam So Sai, Water Erodes Sand; 1969)
- เมียหลวง (Mia Luang, Principal Wife; 1969)
- เพลิงบุญ (Phloeng Bun, Fire of Merit; around 1970s)
- รากแก้ว (Rak Kaeo, Taproot; 1971)
- ปีกทอง (Pik Thong, Golden wings; 1975-1977)
- บ้านขนนก (Ban Khon Nok, Feather House; 1979)
- กระเช้าสีดา (Krachao Sida, Staghorn Fern; 1981)
- บุษบกใบไม้ (Butsabok Baimai, Butsabok of leaves; 1982)
- ปูนปิดทอง (Pun Pit Thong, Gold-Pasted Cement; 1982) (translated as Poon Pid Thong: Gold-pasted Cement, 2014)
- หลงไฟ (Long Fai, Blinded by Flame; 1984)
- เสียงนกจากพราก (Siang Nok Jakkaphrak, The Call of Ruddy Shelduck; 1986)
- ถ่านเก่าไฟใหม่ (Than Kao Fai Mai, Old Ember and a New Fire; 1989)
- กลิ่นฟาง (Klin Fang, The Sweet Scent of Hay; 1993)
- ข้ามสีทันดร (Kham Sithandon, Across the Ocean; 1994-1995)

=== Books under the pen name Kanchala ===
- ดอกหญ้า (Dok Ya, Grass Flower; 1957-1958)
- ดวงตาสวรรค์ (Duangta Sawan, Eyes of Heaven; 1958-1959) (sequel of Dok Ya)
- สาปสวาท (Sap Sawat, Cursed Sweet; 1960-1961)
- พระจันทร์หลงเงา (Phrajan Long Ngao, Moon Lost in the Shadow; 1965)
- ฝันกลางฤดูฝน (Fan Klang Ruedufon, Dream in the spring; around 1970s)
