= Chintara Sukapatana =

Thai actress (born 1965)

- จินตหรา สุขพัฒน์
- Born: Chittima Sukapatana; 22 January 1965 (age 61); Phra Pradaeng, Samut Prakan, Thailand
- Other name: Mam
- Education: Krirk University; Bachelor in Business Admin.; Master in Public Admin.
- Occupation: Actress
- Years active: 1984–present

Chintara Sukapatana (Thai: จินตหรา สุขพัฒน์; RTGS: Chintara Sukkhaphat), born Chittima Sukapatana (Thai: จิตติมาฆ์ สุขพัฒน์; RTGS: Chittima Sukkhaphat, on 22 January 1965), nickname Mam (Thai: แหม่ม; RTGS: Maem), is a Thai actress. Her best-known role was as Trinh in the 1987 Hollywood film, Good Morning, Vietnam, in which she co-starred opposite Robin Williams. At the time, she had already earned a bachelor in business administration degree and studying for a master in public administration at Krirk University.

== Filmography ==
- Lee (1985)
- Song Phi Nong (1985)
- Kaew Krang Dong (1985)
- The Couple (1986)
- Legal Wife (1986)
- Trouble Makers (1986)
- One Heart (1986)
- Jealousy (Raeng Ngao) (1986)
- Duang Jai Krazip Rak (1986)
- Scholar Maid (1986)
- Love Letter (1986)
- Phai Sanae Ha (1987)
- Promise (1987)
- Lang Kha Daeng (1987)
- Relatives (1987)
- U & Me 1 (1987)
- Duay Klaw (1987)
- Love (1987)
- Victim (1987)
- With Love (1987)
- Sarasin Bridge (1987)
- Good Morning, Vietnam (1987)
- Something About “Art” 1 (1988)
- Karn (1988)
- Accidental Love (1988)
- Khu Kam (1988)
- Virgin Market (1988)
- Boonchu Phu Narak (1988)
- Senior (1988)
- U & Me 2 (1988)
- Something About “Art” 2 (1989)
- Silhouette Of God (1989)
- Mean Teacher (1989)
- Chai Laew Lud Lei (1989)
- Fallen Angel (1989)
- Boonchu 2 Nong Mai (1989)
- Yim Nid Kid Thoa Rai (1989)
- New Rich (1989)
- Suthee (1989)
- The Musicians (1989)
- Southern Sea (1990)
- Nang-Eye (1990)
- Boonchu 5 (1990)
- Class 44 (1990)
- Boonchu 6 (1991)
- Dog (1991)
- Sir Ghost (1991)
- Nothing Can Stop (1992)
- Phiang Rao Mi Rao (1992)
- Teacher “Chan Ram” (1992)
- Cha Ku Rak Kot Nong Hai Kong Lok (1992)
- Cha Yai Cha Yo Ko Pho Rao (1992)
- I Miss You (1992)
- Somsri #422 R. (1992)
- Hor Hue Hue (1992)
- Kot Kho Kan Waeo
- Boonchu 7 (1992)
- Somsri Ii (1993)
- Muen and Rid (1993)
- High School Life 1 (1993)
- Once Upon a Time (1994)
- Boonchu 8 (1994)
- Somsri Iii (1994)
- High School Life 2 (1995)
- Satang (2000)
- Feng Shui (2003)
- Chue Chop Chuan Harueang (2003)
- Dek hor (2006)
- Boonchu 9 (2008)
- Bittersweet BoydPod The Short Film (2008)
- Love, Not Yet (2011)

== Television ==
- See Pan Din (Four Reigns) (1991)
- Chaloey Sak (1991)
- Kwarm Ruk See Dum (1995)
- Sapai Glai Peun Tiang (2009)
- Suphapburut Juthathep (2013)
- Sud Kaen Saen Rak (2015)
- Nueng Dao Fah Deaw (2018)
