= Wichuda Suansuwan =

- วิชชุดา สวนสุวรรณ

Personal details
- Born: Nettaya Suansuwan; November 1, 1973 Bangkok, Thailand
- Died: January 7, 1993 (aged 19) Nopparat Rajathanee Hospital, Bangkok
- Occupation: Actress

Wichuda Suansuwan (Thai: วิชชุดา สวนสุวรรณ; nicknamed: Pu; November 1, 1973 – January 7, 1993) was a Thai actress who rose to prominence for her role in the 1992 television drama Arun Sawat. She died not long afterward, at a time when she was still enjoying considerable popularity and fame.

== Life and career ==
Born and raised in Bangkok, where she also received her early education. She attended Bangkapi School through grade 11 (Mathayom 5), after which she passed an equivalency examination. She then enrolled in the Faculty of Humanities and Social Sciences, majoring in Thai Language, at Srinakharinwirot University, Bang Saen Campus (now Burapha University).

She entered the entertainment industry at a young age after attending a taping of Ma Tam Nat, a popular game show on Channel 5 during the 1980s. This led to opportunities to appear in television commercials and documentaries. As she grew older, she made her film debut in 1990 in Thueng Khrao Cha Heng (When Fortune Comes). She later appeared in Dr. Khrok, starring opposite Phonrat Rortraksa, in 1992.

Her breakthrough role came with the television drama Arun Sawat (Good Morning), which aired on Channel 7 in the same year. She starred opposite Sornram Theppitak in the drama, which centered on the lives and experiences of young university students. The series was a major success and made both actors widely popular. Seeing their strong on-screen chemistry, the channel intended to develop them into a popular screen couple and cast them together in further productions.

== Death ==
Wichuda died suddenly while she was still at the height of her fame. She was involved in a fatal road accident while driving a pickup truck herself. The vehicle collided head-on with an oncoming truck, causing her pickup to veer off the road at a bend on King Kaew Road in Samut Prakan province. She had been returning to Bangkok from university in Chonburi, near Bang Saen, where she had been attending classes. The route was one she regularly traveled between the university and her residence in Bangkok, and the particular bend was known as an accident-prone area. She was rushed to Nopparat Rajathanee Hospital, the nearest hospital at the time, but died on January 7, 1993, at the age of just 19. Her funeral and cremation ceremonies were held at Wat Lat Phrao.

Following the sudden death of the young rising star, Channel 7 replaced Wichuda with Suvanant Kongying as the female lead opposite Sornram Theppitak in his next television drama, Phayong (Swagger). Sornram and Suvanant subsequently became one of the channel's most popular on-screen pairings, gaining widespread popularity among Thai television audiences during the 1990s.
