= Penpak Sirikul =

Thai actress and model

- เพ็ญพักตร์ ศิริกุล
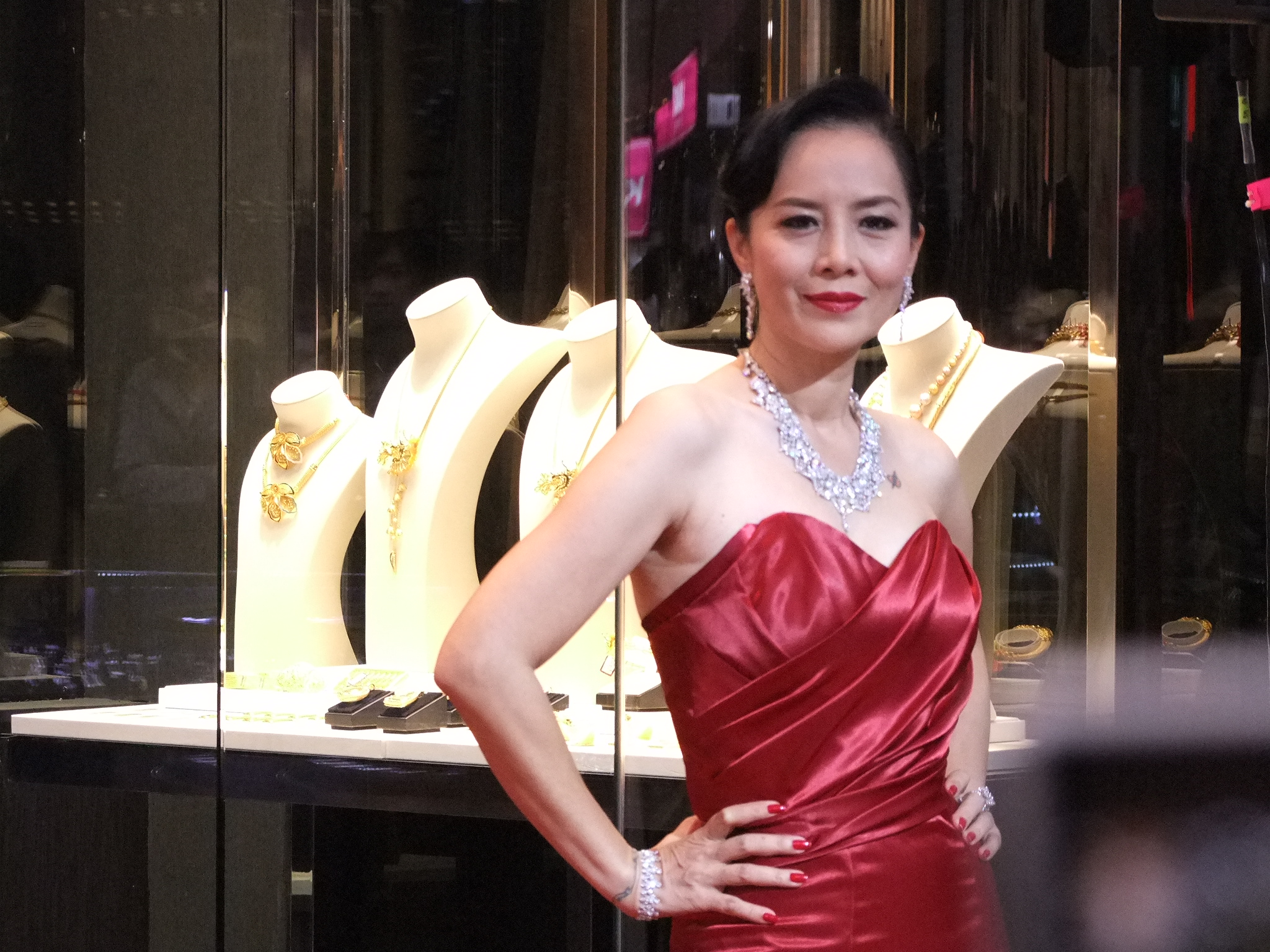
- Penpak at NGG Jewellery event in 2012
- Born: Wanphen Khuenkaeo; 31 January 1961 (age 65); San Sai, Chiang Mai, Thailand
- Other name: Tai (ต่าย)
- Occupations: Actress; model
- Height: 1.67 m (5 ft 5 1/2 in)
- Spouses: Samat Boribunwet (m. 1978; died 1980); Teerapong Leowrakwong (m. 1981; div. 1983); Namphol Ruksapong (m. 1997; div. 2005)
- Children: 1

Penpak Sirikul (Thai: เพ็ญพักตร์ ศิริกุล, RTGS: Phenphak Sirikun; born 31 January 1961) nickname Tai (ต่าย), is an actress and model, well known in the 1970s and 1980s as a Thai sex symbol. By the age of fifty, she was called the 2,000-Year Woman (Thai: Sao Song Pan Pee), as she was considered "forever young".

== Biography ==
Born in Chiang Mai, her real name is Wanphen Khuenkaeo. After winning a beauty contest when she was 19, Penpak became a swimsuit model.

Penpak's first film in 1980 was Dok Sanoh Ban Chao (The sanoh flower blooms in the morning), a drama directed by Jazz Siam. That same year she starred opposite Sorapong Chatree in Fai Narok Khum Lokan (Hell fire).

She had a son at age 30 in February 2012.

== Filmography ==
=== Film ===
Year	Title	Role
1980	Dog Sa Now Ban Show	Nuan
1981	Chaloei Sak	Piromya
1981	Dok Fah Lae Dome Poo Jong Hon	Support role
1981	Poo Kong Yod Ruk	Saranya
1981	Sao No	Marasri
1982	Ka Haeng Kwarm Ruk	Pakbong
1986	Pitsawat Satan	Martha
1987	Pitsawat	Rungrorng
1987	Prommajaree See Dum	Support role
1998	O-Negative	Puk (Prim's mother)
2001	The Legend of Suriyothai	Queen Jiraprapa
2001	Sherry Ann	Suwimol Phongphat
2005	The Bullet Wives	Yai
2006	13 Beloved	Maggie
2006	The Victim	Fai
2009	Primary Love	Mother
2010	Secret Sunday	Nittaya
2011	Kon Khon	Sonklin
2011	The Hangover Part II	Joi
2012	It Gets Better	Saitarn
2012	She: Their Love Story	Bua
2012	Home: Love, Happiness, Memories	Buachan
2014	The Last Executioner	Tew
2014	Call Me Bad Girl	Nueasamut's mother
2016	Pump Namman	Mut
2016	By the Time It Gets Dark	2nd Taew
2017	Pop Aye	Bo
2023	Home for Rent	Ratree

=== Television ===
Year	Title	Role
1981	Fai Ruk Fai Payabaht	Wilasini
1982	Kiew Pit	Support role
1983	Thung Thong Gwao	
1983	Fon Yad Sut Tai	
1984	Yoo Puer Ruk	Pakpring
1984	Thahan Suea Phrachao Tak	U-bon
1985	Maruettayu Si Khiao	Ratirod
1989	Phu Chana Sip Thit	Minbu
1989	Takai Dao	Dak
1991	Sam Noom Sam Moom	Guest role
1992	Kularb Nai Bpleo Fai	Main role
1994	Fai Sin Chua	Orawee
1996	Dok Mai Nai Pah Nao	Petchchuang
1996	Jong Rak	Support role
1996	Yiam Wiman	Duangjai
1997	Sai Roong	Waewphan
1998	Taewada Toke Sawan	Ubon
1999	Barb Ruk	Nalinee
1999	Kijagum Chai Sod	Chaweelamai
1999	Peek Thong	Nopphakao
2000	Sai Tarn Hua Jai	Sunanta
2000	Ku Rak Ku Rob	Support role
2000	Mai Muang	Pada
2000	Lok Thang Bai Hai Nai Khon Diao	Mali
2001	Nee Ruk	Kanita
2001	Kamin Gub Poon	Pitsamorn Jittakanมร
2001	Songkram Dok Ruk	Parnkaew
2002	Plai Thien	Rujiya
2002	Ko Ti Ki Muai	Lin
2002	Ruk Nai Roy Kaen	Karuna
2003	Wimarn Din	Oraphan
2003	Nueng Ruthai	Tiparpa
2004	Poo Chai Mur Song	Chuanchom
2004	Keaw Wan 2001	Rampha
2004	Sapai Puton	Jampha
2004	Ruen Mai See Beige	Suangsini
2005	Ra Bieng Ruk	Yuwadee
2005	Mitr Chaibancha Maya Cheewit	Mitr's mother
2005	Barp Rak Talay Fun	Kanha
2005	Hoi Un Chun Ruk Tur	Trang
2005	Sapai Ka Fak	Kwanjit
2005	Lady Yaowarat	Aupsornwilai
2005	2 + 1 Krang Kern Pikad	Support role
2006	Khun Chai Rai Lem Gwean	Sopee
2007	Jai Jaew Kap Ruea Chio	Mookda
2007	Kasanaka	Malee (Wajun's mother)
2007	Meuh Dok Rak Ban	Saibua
2007	Rai Rissaya	Bencha
2008	Harb Kong Mae	Akimki
2008	Sood Tae Jai Ja Kwai Kwa	Boonsong
2009	Sut Saneha	Napha Boriban
2009	Kuan Kammathep	Duangdao
2009	Jamluey Gamathep	Apsara
2009	Mongkut Saeng Jun	Sinati
2009	Hua Jai 2 Park	Gongthip
2010	Faad Na Ya	Priya
2010	Pieng Jai Tee Pook Pun	Penpisoot
2010	Wan Jai Gub Nai Jom Ying	Pleonchit
2010	365 Wan Haeng Rak	Fortune teller
2011	Ngao Phrai	Philai
2011	Mia Taeng	Praphai
2011	Roy Marn	Vijitra
2011	Lieutenant Opas	Janchai
2012	Rak Prakasit	Lady Daraka
2012	Khun Seuk	Lamphu (Reirai's Mother)
2012	Noom Ban Rai Kub Wan Ja Hai So	Chatda
2012	Phu Pha Prai Mai	Suppha Lak
2012	Leh Roy Ruk	Nappa
2012	Ruk Khun Tao Fah	Nudee's Mother
2012	Nuer Mek 2	Phetthae Nawiyakun
2012	Khun Samee Karmalor Tee Rak	Sukanya
2013	Ruk Roy Laan	Khun Ying Saisamorn
2013	Dao Rueang	Jantra
2013	Dao Kiao Duen	Suri Nioppharat
2014	Sai See Plerng	Duangta (Sai's mother)
2014	Plerng Chimplee	Sriwanla
2014	Fun Fueng	Passorn
2014	Thang Doen Haeng Rak	Darani
2014	Look Mai Lai Rak	Khwanruedee
2015	Ngao Ja	Ram
2015	Kaew Ta Waan Jai	Tuangporn
2015	Luead Mungkorn: Raed	Sokkheng Leelawirotwong
2015	Jad Rak Wiwa Luang	Kingkaew
2015	Sao Noi Soi Rojjana	Ae's mother
2015	Tang Parn Kammathep	Wisa
2016	Angels: Ghost Hunter 2	Pim
2016	Fatal Destiny	Aumpa
2016	Bussaba Na Talad	Chongnang
2016	Sai Lub Rak Pua	Maneemala
2016	Plerng Naree	Peerada Rawiwuth
2016	Saluk Jit	Rumpei
2016	Banlang Hong	Lizhuang
2016	Nang Eye	Sister St. Francis
2017	Chani Phi Lak	Grace
2017	Nang Khaen	Praewa
2017	The Cupids Kammathep Jum Laeng	Kevin's aunt
2017	Sai Lub Jub Abb	Onnatta
2017	Under Her Nose	Nida (EP. 15)
2017	Teenage Mom: The Series	Mek's mother
2017	Club Friday Celeb's Stories: Returning	Ruethai
2017	Buang Banjathorn	Tongriu
2017	Sai Tarn Hua Jai	Sunanta
2017	Bangkok Love Stories EP.Charming Person	Pimpila
2017	7 Wun Jorng Wen Season 2	Prim
2018	Love Bipolar	Yupin
2018	My Hero Series: Heart of the Motherland	Techinee Wasutraphaisan
2018	Kham See Than Dorn	Sawat
2018	Rak Chan Sawan Jat Hai	Kamala
2018	Naet Naki	Amara
2018	Sarb Krasue	Chalantee
2018	Nang Sao Mai Jam Kad Nam Sakul	Pimon
2019	Buang Nareumit	Viyada
2019	Great Men Academy	Love & Good's mother
2019	Winyan Phitsawong	Thanin's mother
2019	Love Beyond Frontier	Rose
2019	Klin Kasalong	Pudkaew / Thongbai
2019	Mr. Smile	Saisawat
2019	3 Will B e Free	Ple (Miw's Mother)
2019	Likit Haeng Jan	Sadej
2019	Burning Jealousy	Nopamart
2019	Plerng Rissaya	Somphis Onnom
2019	Love, Lie, Haunt The Series: The Mysterious House	Busara
2020	Bpai Hai Teung Duang Dao	Kaewmanee
2020	Mother	Mallika
2020	Roy Leh Marnya	Pornpan
2021	Reya	Meng Huai
2021	Krachao Seeda	Namphueng Akkhara
2021	Girl From Nowhere Season 2	Teacher Nareumon (Episode: "True Love")
2021	Krachao Seeda Season 2	Namphueng Akkhara
2021	Game Rak Game Payabaht	Ueakan
2021	Game of Outlaws	Naimae
2022	From Chao Phraya to Irrawaddy	Princess Gunthon
2022	You Are My Heartbeat	Premyuda
2022	Makkali The Love Tree	Phatcha
2022	Mafia The Series: Guns and Freaks	Gasolina
2022	Unforgotten Night	Kim's mother
2022	War Of Y	Koon
2022	Good Old Days	Phu's mother
2022	10 Years Ticket	Pin
2023	My Lucky Star	Anong
2023	Unhating You	Duangjai
2023	Matalada	Duanghathai
2023	Game Rak Torrayod	Mintra
2024	Intern in My Heart	Pavinee
2024	Start-Up	Sirakorn
2024	Time Mun Wela Tai	Chao Wela
2024	Thicha	Ni Wai / Nivarin
