= Lilawadee Plerng =

- Also known as: The Secret Truth
- Genre: Melodrama; Psychology; Mystery; Suspense
- Written by: Kingchat
- Directed by: Triyuth Kingphakorn
- Starring: Anyarin Terathananpat; Thanwa Suriyajak; Nusba Punnakanta; Pheerawas Kulnanwat
- Opening theme: "Saneha" by Anyarin Terathananpat & Thanwa Suriyajak
- Ending theme: "Saneha" by Anyarin Terathananpat
- Country of origin: Thailand
- Original language: Thai
- No. of episodes: 17

Production
- Producer: Chavalit Pongchaiyong
- Production location: Thailand
- Running time: 130 minutes Fridays, Saturdays and Sundays at 20:30 (ICT)
- Production companies: Bangkok Broadcasting & T.V. Co., Ltd; Prakotkarndee Co., Ltd

Original release
- Network: Channel 7
- Release: January 3 – February 8, 2015

Related
- Evening News: Second Edition; Chid Jor Ror Doo

Lilawadee Plerng, also written as Leelawadee Plerng (Thai: ลีลาวดีเพลิง; RTGS: Lilawadi Phloeng; lit: Fire Plumeria; English title: The Secret Truth) is a Thai TV drama or lakorn aired on Channel 7 from January 3 to February 8, 2015 on Fridays, Saturdays and Sundays at 20:30 for 17 episodes.

== Summary ==
The only daughter of the man who killed his mom asks him to help prove the innocence of her dad. Thiwit was the only witness to the killing of his mom by her ex-lover. But he was knocked out from a blow to the head and couldn't remember anything that happened that day. The only evidence that tied Linn's father to the crime was a red plumeria (a lilawadee flower in Thai language). She took on the alias, "Lilawadee Plerng" and works as a nightclub singer in order to investigate the truth so she can clear her dad's name from the crime he didn't commit. The case was a long time ago when she and he was little. Thiwit wanted to chase Lilawadee away but there's something about her that make him want to help her prove the truth. Find out to see who was the real killer.

== Cast ==
| Role | Actor |
|---|---|
| Lilyn (Noolee, Linn) | Anyarin Terathananpat |
| Thiwat (Wyn) | Thanwa Suriyajak |
| Supharom (Tay) | Nusba Punnakanta |
| Saksit (Meng) | Prush Poramin |
| Wishanee (Nee, Chef Nee) | Panthorthong Boonthong |
| Ananyoth (One) | Pheerawas Kulnanwat |
| Songphol | Sakrat Ruekthamrong |
| Supisra (Toi), Vannit (Nit) | Punyaporn Poonpipat |
| Pongpop (Pong) | Trakan Panthummalertruji |
| Sub-Inspector San | Weerachai Hattagowit |
| Sita | Amena Pinit |
| Kritsada | Jayjintai Untimanon |

== Awards and nominations ==
| Year | Award | Category | Recipient | Result |
|---|---|---|---|---|
| 2015 | Asian Television Awards | Best Actress In A Supporting Role | Nusba Punnakanta | Won |
| 2015 | Asian Television Awards | Best Actor In A Supporting Role | Pheerawas Kulnanwat | Nominated |
