= Patcharapa Chaichua =

Thai actress (born 1978)

- พัชราภา ไชยเชื้อ
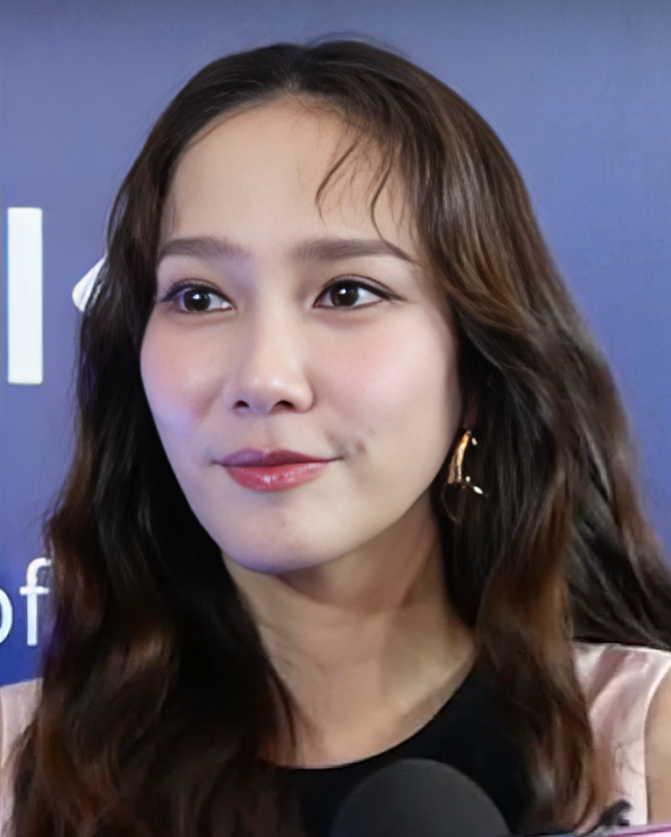
- Patcharapa in 2025
- Born: Khaimuk Chaichua; (ไข่มุก ไชยเชื้อ); 5 December 1978 (age 47); Bangkok, Thailand
- Other name: Aum
- Education: Rangsit University
- Occupations: Actress; model
- Years active: 1997–present

Patcharapa Chaichua (Thai: พัชราภา ไชยเชื้อ; RTGS: Phatcharapha Chaichuea; born 5 December 1978), nicknamed Aum (Thai: อั้ม; RTGS: Am), is a Thai actress, model, and television presenter. Having entered the entertainment industry in 1997, she was formerly signed with Channel 7 and is currently a freelance actress following the expiration of her contract.

== Biography ==
Patcharapa was born on 5 December 1978 in Bangkok, Thailand. Her birth name is "Khaimuk Chaichua", which later changed to "Patcharapa Chaichua". She entered the entertainment industry in 1997 after she won a beauty and talent contest called HACKS. The TV series that put Aum Patchrapa in the spotlight was So Sanaeha in 2003. She played the lead role of Pralee. Aum won the 2003 TOP Award for Best Leading Actress. That year, Chaichua starred in Fake for her first movie.

She won her second TOP Award in 2005 for Pleung Payu which also starred Tana Suttikamol. Since then she has been the highest-paid actress in Thailand. Aum Patchrapa once again was nominated for the Top Awards in 2006, as Best Leading Actress for the lakorns Pin mook and Song Sanaeha, but the award went to Ann Thongprasom for the lakorn Oum ruk. Besides her talent in acting, Aum Patchrapa was voted FHM (Thai edition's) sexiest woman for three consecutive years (2004 to 2006) but in 2007 she was beaten by May Pichanart.

== Personal life ==
Aum was once romantically involved with Pok Prathanawong Pornprapha. They officially announced the end of their relationship through a statement on social media in 4 January 2023.

== Filmography ==
=== TV series ===
All have been broadcast on Channel 7.

YEAR	Drama	Role	Show partners	Produced by
1997	Manee Neua Thai	Ploy Phailin.	Kongkrapun Sangsuriya	Dida Video Production
1998	E-Sa	Chai-Sawang	Danuporn Punnakun	Dara Video
1998	Chor-Fun-Pa Nun Ruk	Chauwn-Fun	Akkarat Sarasuk	Aukkara
1998	Ku-Kuey-Koo-Kuwan	Pan Chewa (Pan)	Aummarin Simaroj	Dara Video
1999	Look Wha	Look Wha	Cheaster McDonal	Dara Video
1999	Ruk Song Pop	KuSuMa	Swich Petwisedsiri	Aukkara
1999	Pup Plung See Chompoo	Lily	Ratipong Phumalee	Dida Video Production
1999	Mae Nak	Mae Nak	Pete Tongchuea	Dara video
2000	Mor Ra Sum Hang Chee Wit	Pha Su Nee	Thiraphat Satchakun	Dara Video
2000	Rak Na Ka ra	Man Mueng	Danuporn Punnakun	Dara video
2001	Kom Pha Ya Bath	Pia	Veeraparb Suparbpaiboon	Dida Video Production
2001	Petch Tud Petch	Pai Luh'	Jetrin Wattanasin	Dara Vedio
2002	Tun Kammathep	Anoma	Nuti Khemmayothin	Dara Video
2002	Jit Sung Harn	Karima Voranun (Cream)	Natthawut Sakitchai	Dara Video
2002	Jara Chon Yod Rak	Orranee	Ruergsak Roychusak	RS
2003	Kammathep Tua Noi	Muthita	Shahkrit Yamnam	559 on Air
2003	So Sanaeha	Pralee	Thana Suthikamorn	Pao Jin Jong
2003	Derm Pun Woon Wiwa	Plengpin Ratanasirin	Phanu Suwanno	Dara Vedio
2004	7 Pha Gran	Lum Doaun	Danuporn Punnakun	Dida Video Production
2004	Pha Mai	Lenu Nuoan	Natthawut Sakitchai	Dida Video Production
2004	Nang Sao jing jai Kub Nai San Dee	Miss Jingjai	Jesdaporn Pholdee	Polyplus
2005	Chaloey Barb	Methinee	Phanu Suwanno	Lenetus
2005	Plueng Payu	Dr.Parichat	Thana Suthikamorn	Pao jin jong
2005	HemmaRaj	Kajarin	Sornram Theppitak	Dida Video Production
2005	Song Sanaeha	Dearnyard/Philardluk	Veeraparb Suparbpaiboon	Polyplus
2006	Sai Luerd Haeng Rak	Alin	Pattarapol Silpajarn	Pao Jin Jong
2006	Pin Mook	Pinmook	Siwat Chotchaicharin	Dara Video
2006	Rang Rit Pit Sa Wad	Phar Wa	Sunti Weerabunchai	Kantana
2007	Bub Peh Leh Ruk	Vi&Kavita	Nutthawut Sakidjhai	Polyplus
2008	Yey Fha Tha Din	Ticha	Sukollawat Kanarot	Kantana
2009	Mia Luang	OrnIn	Thiraphat Satchakun	Dara Video
2009	Jaew Jai Rai Kub Chai Taewada	Jaew	Arak Amornsupasiri	Polyplus
2009	Kularb Nuea Mek	Airin	Woranut Bhirombhakdi	Dara Video
2010	Prajun La Payak	Junchai	Sukollawat Kanarot	Polyplus
2011	Ku Kaen San Ruk (คู่แค้นแสนรัก)	Ingdao Naowarat / Daopradub Tubjakrawan	Shahkrit Yamnam	Polyplus
2011	Nai Roy Ruk (ในรอยรัก)	Maanmuslin	Pong Nawat Kulrattanarak	Dara Vedio
2012	Ubatihet (อุบัติเหตุ)	Wisani	Akkaphan Namart	Dara Video
2014	Prao (พราว)	Prao & Min (both twins)	Sukollawat Kanarot	Pordeecam
2017	Plerng Phra Nang (เพลิงพระนาง)	Imperial Noble Consort Ananthip	Kelly Thanapat	Kantana
2020	Jark Sadtroo Soo Hua Jai (จากศัตรูสู่หัวใจ)	Sophita	Mik Thongraya	Mummai
2023	Lom Phat Phan Dao (ลมพัดผ่านดาว)	Daracha	Jesdaporn Pholdee & Hussawee Pakrapongpisan	Dreamers Society Creation
TBA	Sanae Nang (เสน่ห์นาง)	Nang	Jinna Navarat	

=== Movie ===
YEAR	Drama	Role	Show partners	Produced by
2003	Fake	Bwina	Leo Putt, Thar Barbie, Ray McDonald	Sahamongkol Film
2007	Ghost Child	Nantha		
2010	Ghost Mother	Rati	Thana Suthikamorn	Sahamongkol Film
2011	Fabulous 30	Ja	Phuphoom Pongpanu	M-Thirty Nine
2015	Single Lady (ซิงเกิลเลดี้ เพราะเคยมีแฟน)	Bright	Arak Amornsupasiri	Transformation Films
2023	Tid Noy (ทิดน้อย)	Nak	Pongsak Pongsuwan, Ananda Everingham	M39 Pictures

=== Host ===
YEAR	Programs	Produced by
2004	Jor Jie	Channel 7

== Awards and nominations ==
=== Television Awards ===
==== Nataraja Awards ====
Year	Nominated work	Category	Result
2010	Jaew Jai Rai Kub Khun Chai Taewada	Best Actress	Nominated
2011	Pra Jun Lai Payak	Best Actress	Nominated
2015	Prao	Best Actress	Nominated
2018	Plerng Pra Nang	Best Actress	Nominated

==== TV Gold Awards ====
Year	Nominated work	Category	Result
2005	Nangsao Jingjai Gub Nai Sandee	Best Actress	Nominated
2006	Plerng Payu	Best Actress	Nominated
2010	Jaew Jai Rai Kub Khun Chai Taewada	Best Actress	Nominated
2012	Koo Kaen Saen Rak	Best Actress	Nominated
2018	Plerng Pra Nang	Best Actress	Nominated

==== Top Awards ====
Year	Nominated work	Category	Results
2002	Jit sang han	Best Actress	Nominated
2003	So Saneha	Best Actress	Won
2005	Nang Sao Jingjai	Best Actress	Nominated
2006	Plerng Payu	Best Actress	Won
2010	Pra jan lai payak	Best Actress	Won

=== Film Awards ===
Year	Award	Category	Nominated work	Result
2012	9th Starpics Thai Films Awards	Best Actress	Fabulous 30	Nominated
2012	9th Kom Chad Luek Awards	Best Actress	Fabulous 30	Nominated
2012	20th Bangkok Critics Assembly Awards	Best Actress	Fabulous 30	Nominated
2012	21st Suphannahong National Film Awards	Best Actress	Fabulous 30	Nominated
2012	4th Siam Dara Star Awards	Best Actress	Fabulous 30	Won
2012	4th Siam Dara Star Awards	Siam Dara Star Popular Vote Female	Fabulous 30	Won
