= Kathaleeya McIntosh =

Thai actress (born 1972)

- คัทลียา แมคอินทอช
- Born: 10 November 1972 (age 53); Bangkok, Thailand
- Other names: Kathaleeya Grachangnetara; Mam
- Education: Assumption University
- Occupations: Actress; model; television presenter
- Years active: 1987–present
- Notable work: In Family We Trust; Yak Yud Tawan Wai Thi Plai Fa; Wanjai Thailand
- Height: 1.70 m (5 ft 7 in)
- Spouse: Songkran Grachangnetara (m. 2006)
- Children: 3
- Relatives: Willy McIntosh

Kathaleeya McIntosh (Thai: คัทลียา แมคอินทอช; born 10 November 1972) is a Thai actress and television presenter, who was named as Princess of the entertainment industry. She was the lead actress in many Thai lakorns in the 1990s-2000s including Wanjai Thailand (“Sweet Darling of Thailand”), Khwamsongcham Mai Hua Jai Derm (“New Memory but Same Old Heart”), and Yak Yud Tawan Wai Thi Plai Fa (“Yearning to Stop the Sun at the Horizon”). She was also a television host in a popular talkshow, Samakhom Chomdao.

== Early life and education ==
McIntosh was born to a Scottish father and a Thai Chinese mother. She has an older brother, Willy McIntosh, who is also a well-known Thai actor. McIntosh started her modeling career when she was 15. She graduated from Assumption University with Bachelor of Arts majoring in English.

== Filmography ==
=== Television ===
- Peur Ter (Ch.5 1994)
- Yark Yood Tawan Wai Tee Plai Fah (Ch.5 1995)
- Ruen Mayura (Ch.3 1997)
- Rak Tae Kae Khob Fah (Ch.5 1997)
- Kwam Song Jum Mai Huajai Derm (Ch.5, 1998)
- Chai Mai Jing Ying Tae (Ch.3 1998)
- Kwam Song Jum Mai Huajai Derm (Ch.5, 1998)
- Dokkaew Karabuning (Ch.3, 2000)
- Kao Waan Hai Noo Pen Sai Lub (Ch.3, 2000)
- Muang Maya (Ch.5, 2000)
- Nee Ruk (Ch.5, 2001)
- Tok Kra Dai Hua Jai Ploy Jone (Ch.3, 2003)
- Wan Jai Thailand (Ch.3, 2004)
- Pluerk Sanae Ha (Ch.5, 2007)
- Trab Sin Dind Fah (Ch.5, 2008)
- Plub Plerng See Chompoo (Ch.3, 2015)
- Mueng Maya Live The Series (ONE HD, 2018)
- The Crown Princess (Ch.3 2018) cameo
- Wiman Cho Ngoen (ONE HD, 2018)
- In Family We Trust (ONE HD, 2018)
- Phatukart/Blood Brothers (ONE HD, 2019)
- Deja Vu (ONE HD, 2020)
- One Year 365 (ONE HD, 2020)
- Maya Saneha (Ch.3, 2021)
- Help Me Kun Pi Chuay Duay (Ch.3, 2021)
- Sineha Saree/The Curse of Saree (ONE HD, 2022)
- Sen Longjijood Tee 180 Ongsa Lak Pan Rao (ONE HD, 2022)
- Sab Son Rak/Retribution (CH.3, 2022)
- The Three GentleBros (GMM 25, 2022)
- Rak/Rai (ONE HD, 2023)
- Doctor Detective (Thai TV series) (Ch.3, 2023)
- Tayat Mai Lek1 (ONE HD, 2025)
- The Bangkok Red Opera (ONE HD, 2026)

=== Movies ===
- Muang Maya The Movie: Songkram Nak Pun Rak (GDH 559, TBA) with Nusba Punnakantan & Lukkade Metinee Kingpayome

== TV Show ==
- Samakhom Chomdao
- Thailand's Got Talent (season 6)

== Other works ==
- Ambassador of Peace for Children and Youth of UNICEF, United Nations.
- Assistant Sales Manager of Lucks (666) Company Ltd., Production of Saranae Show
- Producer of Saranae Show, I SEE YOU, and almost every shows of Lucks 666.

== Controversy ==
On September 2, 2005, McIntosh made front-page news in Thailand with an announcement that she was five months pregnant. This came after repeated, and much publicised, previous denials.

In May 2006, she got married in Pran Buri, Prachuap Khiri Khan to Songkran Grachangnetara (Beebee), the father of her son.
