= Sut Saneha =

- Also known as: A Recipe for Love
- สูตรเสน่หา
- Written by: Kingchat; Natthiya Sirakonwilai
- Directed by: Ampaiporn Jitmai-ngong
- Starring: Theeradej Wongpuapan; Ann Thongprasom; Willy McIntosh; Sonia Couling
- Opening theme: Theme song by Sai Fahrenheit
- Ending theme: "Ordinary People" by Chinawut Indracusin
- Country of origin: Thailand
- Original language: Thai
- No. of episodes: 16

Production
- Producer: Hathairat Amatavanit
- Production location: Bangkok
- Running time: Wednesday - Thursday

Original release
- Network: Channel 3
- Release: October 29 – December 23, 2009

Sut Saneha (Thai: สูตรเสน่หา, RTGS: Sut Sa Ne Ha) is a 2009 Thai lakorn (telenovela), based on best selling novel by famous author King Chat, starring Theeradej Wongpuapan, Ann Thongprasom, Willy McIntosh and Sonia Couling that originally aired on Channel 3 (Thailand).

== Plot ==
The story revolves around Alin (Ann Thongprasom), a 30-year-old Nang Ek (นางเอก: soap opera star) with an over-inflated sense of her own celebrity. Aware that her career is on the wane because of her age and much younger competition, Alin is looking to marry the "right" man; handsome, rich, famous, with a prestigious name and a mansion to match. When she is contacted by television producer Khun Lek Anucha (Willy McIntosh) to audition as a celebrity chef for his new TV cooking show, Alin quickly accepts but lies about her lack of cooking skills. She immediately falls in love with Khun Lek the first time they meet and hatches a plan to marry him.

While Alin's reputation is that of a typical prim and proper actress, in reality she is stubborn, spoiled, conceited, and childlike. Desperate to land the cooking show job, Alin hires the earnest apprentice chef Din/Pasu (Theeradeth Wonpuapan) to quickly teach her how to cook. The two opposite personalities immediately clash but soon come to appreciate one another. Through the course of the story, Alin develops feelings for Din while questioning her desire to marry the "perfect man" Khun Lek.

== Cast ==
- Ken Theeradeth Wongpuapan as Phasu "Din" Boriban / Kru Cook - working as a cooking teacher in a university and a chef in an Italian restaurant, he later becomes the cooking teacher of Alin, though every time they encounter each other it always end up in arguments but later Din or Kru Cook (the nickname given to him by Alin) falls for Alin's outgoing personality. It is also shown that he is the son of a very wealthy man and the maid of the household they are currently living in. Because of this he is often bullied or looked down upon by his stepbrother Lom and stepsister Nam.

It is also later revealed that he is the former co-worker of Sophita and harbors romantic feelings for her but on the day he will propose to her, Sophita introduces Anucha to her boyfriend, later the father of her child.

- Ann Thongprasom as Alin "Lin" Thipphayada - a 30-year-old famous Nang'Ek whose popularity has gone away because of her age and much younger competition. She is currently looking for her "Mr. Right", a man who is rich, famous, and has a prestigious background. Having no jobs for a while, she is later contacted by Praew, the secretary of Anucha, to host a cooking show. She quickly accepts, and there she meets Din Pasu whom she nicknames as "Kru Cook". Though they often argue about things Alin quickly becomes attached to Kru Cook, later realizing that she loves "Kru Cook".

Alin is also known for her different personalities she inherited from her late aunties, which is described by Smally as why Alin is very different from any other people. By the end of the series she and Din marry.

- Willy McIntosh as Anucha "Lek" Sophat - a wealthy man and the father of Sophita's daughter. He is Alin's "Mr. Right" though he doesn't really take Alin seriously at first because of his love and obligation with Sophita and his daughter, but later tries to pursue Alin for his mother's satisfaction, but later realizes that he loves Sophita. By the end of the series he remarries Sophita while not listening to his mother's advice like he did before.
- Sonia Couling as Sophita "Ta" Jarukorn - Din's former co-worker and love interest and Anucha's former wife after being kicked out by Anucha's mother. After marrying Anucha they have a daughter named Pupey who has a health problem. She later suffers after Anucha's evil mother kicked her out of their household, which almost gave her a miscarriage and is currently ruining her life after finding out that she is getting some support from Anucha. At the end of the series she and Anucha remarry and live a happy life.

=== Supporting cast ===
- Nithi Samutkhochon as Khom-Patikhom "Smally" - Alin and Din's friend and Alin's manager. He is shown to be one of the people who always helps Alin when Alin creates trouble or in a showbiz issue and the one that helps Alin find her cooking teacher.
- Nithichai Yotamonsunthon as Wayu "Lom" Boriban - Din's stepbrother and Nam's biological brother and also the boyfriend of Ming. He is an ambitious person who always looks down on the people below him, including Din. After knowing that Din is connected to the famous Alin, he tries to pursue Alin but fails due to Alin protecting Din from his evil stepbrother. This leads to Ming and Alin's brawl in the market and later reveals his plan to Ming to ruin Din's life. He is one of the antagonists in the story.
- Panwat Memani as Ming Durarat Utsanee - the girlfriend of Lom and once a well-known actress just like Alin, but after Alin ruins her image at the red carpet her career ended which led her to the point where she will want to get her revenge on Alin by also ruining her career but after many attempts she always fail. She is one of the antagonists of the story.
- Daran Bunyasak as Warin "Nam" Boriban- Lom's biological sister and Din's stepsister. Just like Lom she is an ambitious person who thinks too highly of herself knowing that she is the daughter of a very wealthy man and looks down on Din since Din's mother is just the maid of the household. She is one of the antagonists in the story.
- Phenphak Sirikun as Napha "Fa" Boriban
- Kriangkrai Unhanan as Kru Anun - Alin's father who is also wealthy since he owns a very big farm in the country.
- Duangchai Hathaikan as Nongphanga
- Duangta Tungkhamani as Amara Sophat
- Chomphu Konbai as On
- Pachari Na Nakhon as Phiao
- Phanthila Fuklin as Hyong Guen - a Thai/Korean rising actress who takes an interest to Din that lead to Alin's jealousy and leading her to say that Din is gay to Hyong Guen. She later plays the daughter Alin in one of Alin's recent lakorn (drama). She loves the impression of "Sarang haeyo" ("I love you" in Korean) and kimchi (a well-known food in Korea or expression).

=== Guests ===
- Nathawan Saksirik as Tongta "Tong" (episodes 6 & 13) - the girl who is chosen by Din to be one of Alin's guests on her TV show. Known to be a straightforward type of person at her age, Alin doesn't get along with her but ends up blackmailing her, which leads to the success of her own show.

== Actors 2009 ==
Year	2009
Broadcast station	Channel 3
Dramatis	Lakorn Co., Ltd.
Television script	Nattiya Sirakornwilai
Directed	Ampaiporn Jitmai-ngong
The character	Main actor
Phasu Boriban (Din, Kru Cook)	Theeradeth Wongpuapan (ธีรเดช วงศ์พัวพันธ์)
Alin Thipphayada (Ping, Lin)	Ann Thongprasom (แอน ทองประสม)
Anucha Sophat (Lek) (Pupae Father)	Willy McIntosh (วิลลี่ แมคอินทอช)
Sophita Jarukorn (Ta) (Pupae Mather)	Sonia Couling (ซอนย่า คูลิ่ง)
Patikhom (Khom, Smally) (Phasu Friend)	Job Niti Samutkojorn (นิธิ สมุทรโคจร)
The character	Supporting Cast
Warin Boriban (Nam)	Daran Boonyasak (สินิทธา บุญยศักดิ์)
Durarat Utsanee (Ming)	Pei Panward Hemmanee (ปานวาด เหมมณี)
Wayu Boriban (Lom)	Nithichai YotAmornSunthorn (Yuan) (นิธิชัย ยศอมรสุนทร)
Amara Sophat (Anucha Mather)	Duangta Toongkamanee (ดวงตา ตุงคะมณี)
Napha Boriban (Fa)	Penpak Sirikul (เพ็ญพักตร์ ศิริกุล)
Nongphanga (Phasu Mather)	Duangchai Hathaikan (ดวงใจ หทัยกาญจน์)
Eisaraphon (Ei) (Meca wife)	Orahathai Siosrisawads (อรหทัย ซื่อศรีสวัสดิ์)
Phiao (Anucha secretary)	Pajaree Na Nakorn (ปาจารีย์ ณ นคร)
Meca (Mek) (Eisaraphon (Ei) Husband)	Sumed Ongoad (สุเมธ องอาจ)
Lukpen (Makeup artist)	Jubjib Chernyim (จุ๊บจิ๊บ เชิญยิ้ม)
On (Nongphanga Servant)	Chompoo konbai (ชมพูนุช กลิ่นจำปา)
Pupae (pae)	Anna Anisa Grant (ด.ญ.แอนนา อนิสา กร้านท์)
The character	Invited actor
Kru Anun (Alin Father)	Kriangkrai Unhanandana (เกรียงไกร อุณหะนันทน์)
Hyong Guen (Thai/Korean rising actress)	Phanthila Fuklin (ภัณฑิลา ฟูกลิ่น)
Kun Pa Klang	Donrod Dechapratum (ดลรส เดชะประทุม)
Kun Pa Yai	Orasri Balensiaka (อรศรี บาเล็นซิเอก้า)
Kun Pa Lek	Marayad Tayaded (มารยาท ถายะเดช)
Sira Riengviriya (Ploy) (Model at work)	Titaree Jidtiteeraroad (ฐิตารีย์ จิตติธีรโรจน์)
Oranicha Tengsakun (Miwmiw) (Model at work)	Sarocha Roumpaothai (สโรชา ร่วมเผ่าไทย)
journalist 1	Jirapad Sawangjang (จีรภัทร์ สว่างแจ้ง)
Pee of the drama team	Sirin Srikao (ศิรินทร ศรีแก้ว)
Lawyer Office	Wantanee Chanayangyuen (วันทนีย์ ชนะชัยยั่งยืน)
CONTRAZ LIAN RESTAURANT Manager	
Pa Lieo (Boriban Domestic servant)	Mareim kammeing (มาเรียม คำเมือง)
Somded (Condo Public Relations Officer)	
Jay, the owner, rented a luxury restaurant.	Ngang-piece Sakuntala (งานพีช สกุนตลา)
Alin Thipphayada (Ping, Lin) (Childhood)	(ด.ญ.)
journalist 2	Piroad Nayplai (ไพโรจน์ น้อยพลาย)
Mai Yai (Napha (Fa), Meca (Mek), Warin (Nam) and Wayu (Lom) Mather)	
Tawat (Owatan Co., Ltd. Employees)	Narad Padtanapongchai (ณรัฐ พัฒนาพงศ์ชัย)
Reim (Pupae Mentor)	
Tampong (Tam) (Tongta Younger brother)	(ด.ช.)
Tongta (Tong, pobpia) (Tampong Sister)	Nathawan Saksirik (ด.ญ.นัดตะวัน ศักดิ์ศิริ)
journalist 3	Wason Sridien (วสันต์ ศรีเดือน)
Hyong Guen Mather	
Nang Tim (Boriban Domestic servant)	
Supa (Owatan Co., Ltd. Employees)	Wita Deeplangploy (วิตา ดีปลั่งพลอย)
Accounting staff Owatan Co., Ltd.	Kasem Saimun (เกษม ทรายมูล)
Informal creditors 1	Nipon Jidkeid (Kob Sakplakrab) (นิพนธ์ จิตเกิด (กบ สักปลาคร๊าฟ))
Informal creditors 2	Poramed Samed (ปรเมศ สามารถ)
journalist 4	
Police	Viroad Ledwidworawad (วิโรจน์ เลิศวิทย์วรวัฒน์)
Pa Hyong Guen	Prapai Sinotok (ประไพ สิโนทก)
Prasong Lawyer	Tanapad Singamrad (ธนภัทร สีงามรัตน์)
Tom (Police)	Wisava Papparangsi (วิศว ทัพพะรังสี)
Police	Siriwed Jareinchon (สิริเวช เจริญชนม์)
journalist 5	Maneeyanan Limsawad (มณียานันท์ ลิ้มสวัสดิ์)
Police	Somjat Thongpreche (สมเจตต์ ทองเพชร)
Badloung	Yodsai Padchanee (ยอดชาย พัชนี)

== Quote ==
If you fall in love with someone because he's perfect.. Then one day when you find a flaw in him, you will easily fall out of love for him. But if you fall in love with someone because you love him for him. He will become perfect in your eyes...and you will love him..no matter what happens.

== Awards ==
Year	Award/recognition	Category	Nominee	Result
2009	Nataraja Awards	Best Arrangement	Sood Sanae Ha	Nominated
2009	Nataraja Awards	Best Actor	Ken Theeradeth Wonpuapan	Won
2009	Nataraja Awards	Best Actress	Ann Thongprasom	Won
2009	Media Choice Awards	Outstanding Drama Series	Sood Sanae Ha	Won
2009	Media Choice Awards	Best Director	Ampaiporn Jitmaingong	Won
2009	Media Choice Awards	Best Actor	Ken Theeradeth Wonpuapan	Won
2009	Media Choice Awards	Best Actress	Ann Thongprasom	Won
2009	Top Awards	Best Actor in a Drama Series	Ken Theeradeth Wonpuapan	Won
2009	Top Awards	Best Actress in a Drama Series	Ann Thongprasom	Won
2009	Top Awards	Best Drama Series	Sood Sanae Ha	Nominated
2009	Top Awards	Best Director	Ampaiporn Jitmaingong	Nominated
2009	Young Generation Choice Awards	Best On-Screen Couple	Ken Theeradeth Wonpuapan & Ann Thongprasom	Won
2009	Young Generation Choice Awards	Best On-Screen Couple of the Year	Ken Theeradeth Wonpuapan & Ann Thongprasom	Won
2009	Golden Television Awards	Outstanding Television Drama	Sood Sanae Ha	Won
2009	Golden Television Awards	Outstanding Actor	Ken Theeradeth Wonpuapan	Won
2009	Golden Television Awards	Outstanding Actress	Ann Thongprasom	Won
2009	7th Annual Magazine Award	Best Actress	Ann Thongprasom	Won

== International broadcast ==
- This lakorn aired in Vietnam on July 13, 2015, on TodayTV VTC7, under the title Công thức tình yêu.
