= Willie McIntosh (actor) =

Thai actor (born 1970)

- วิลลี่ แมคอินทอช
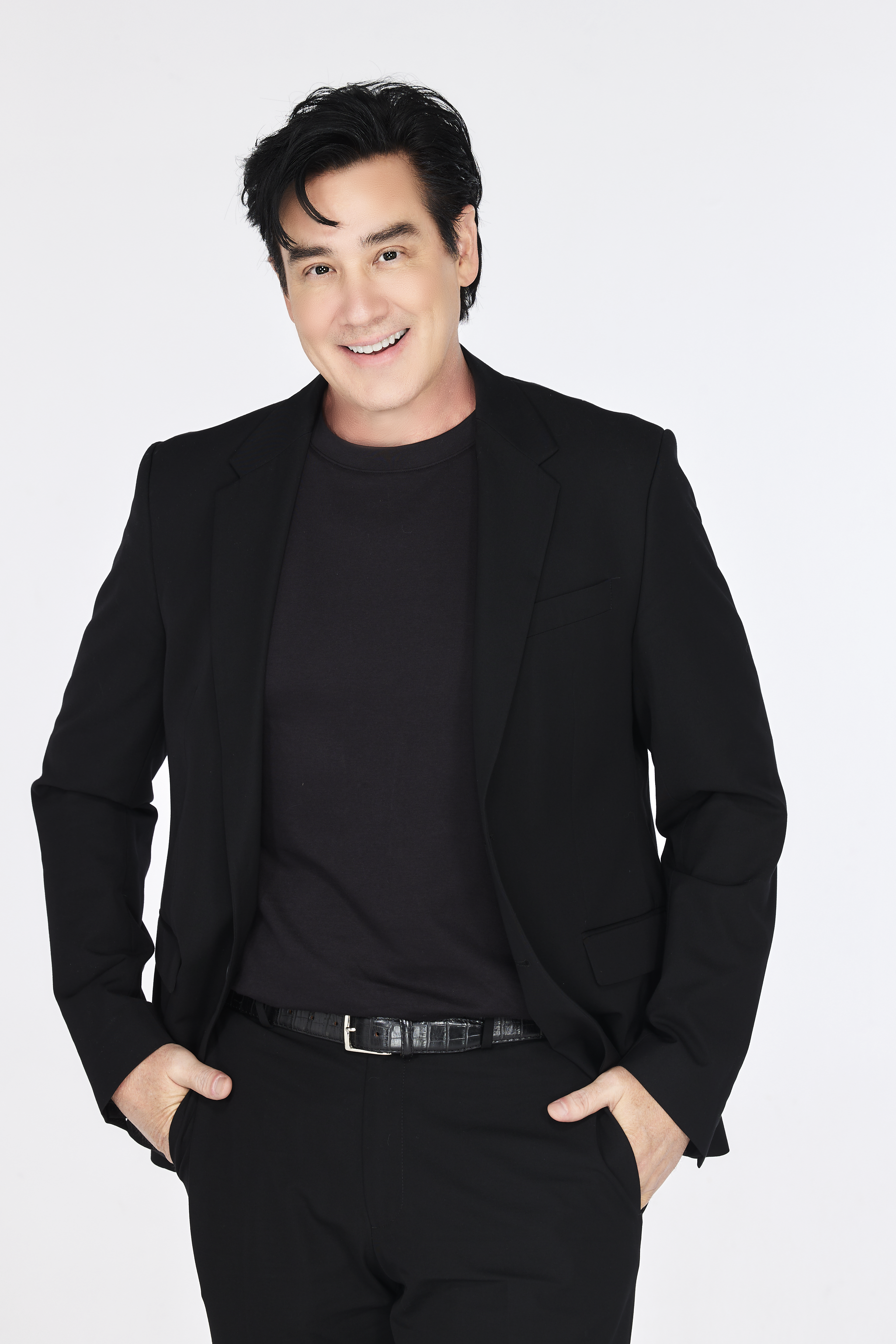
- Willie McIntosh
- Born: Ruengrit McIntosh (Thai: เริงฤทธิ์ แมคอินทอช); April 4, 1970 (age 56); Bangkok, Thailand
- Education: Eastern Michigan University College of Technology
- Occupations: Actor; producer; television presenter
- Spouse: Geraldine Ricondel
- Children: 1
- Relatives: Kathaleeya McIntosh

Willie McIntosh (Thai: วิลลี่ แมคอินทอช) is a Thai actor and television presenter. He also produces TV show and Thai films such as Saranair Show, Saranair Siblor and Saranair hen phi.

== Early life and education ==
McIntosh was born to a Scottish pilot father and a Thai Chinese mother. His younger sister is also a well-known Thai actress, Kathaleeya McIntosh. He graduated from Eastern Michigan University, United States.

== Personal life ==
In 1995, McIntosh began dating fashion model Geraldine Ricondell. They were married in 2006, at the Holy Rosary Church. Ricondell gave birth to their son on 19 August 2014 in Bangkok.

== Filmography ==
- (1989) Tanya: Maemod Yod Yoong
- (1990) Num Sao
- (1991) Mangkon Chao Phaya 2
- (1995) Mahasajan Hang Rak
- (2009) Saranae Hao Peng
- (2010) Saranae Siblor
- (2010) Saranae hen phi
- (2012) Saranae O sei kai
- (2017) Saranae Love You
- (2021) Dark World
- (2022) Baktangmo

== Television ==
=== TV Series ===
- Reun Ram (1993) (Channel 7)
- Muean Khon La Fark Fah (1994) (Channel 3)
- Prasard Mued (1994) (Channel 3)
- Nimit Hang Ruk (1995) (Channel 3)
- Fai Tang See (1995) (Channel 3)
- Sai See Pleung (1996) (Channel 3)
- Ruk Diow Kong Jenjira (1996) (Channel 3)
- Tam Hua Jai Pai Sood Lah (1997) (Channel 3)
- Fai Luang (1998) (1998) (Channel 3)
- Pao Pla Lai (1998) (Channel 3)
- Jarkfun Sunirandon (1998) (Channel 3)
- Ruk Lae Patubai (1999) (Channel 3)
- Manee Yard Fah (2000) (Channel 3)
- Kak Petch (2001) (Channel 3)
- Viwa Salub (2002) (Channel 3)
- Nangrai (2001) (Channel 3)
- 5 Kom (2002) (Channel 3)
- Kor Plik Fah Tarm Lah Tur (2003) (Channel 3)
- Jay Dun Chun Ruk Tur (2005) (Channel 3)
- 2 Pu Ying Yai (2005) (Channel 3)
- Sapai Ka Fak (2005) (Channel 3)
- Soo Fun Nirundorn (2008) (Channel 3)
- Sut Saneha (2009) (Channel 3)
- Club Friday The Series 5 (2015) (GMM25)
- Seu Rissaya (2015) (ONEHD)
- Poo Ying Kon Nun Chue Boonrawd (2015) (ONEHD)
- Krungthep Mahanakorn Sorn Ruk (2016) (ONEHD)
- Plerng Kritsana The Series (2017) (GMM25)
- Cheewit Puer Kah Huajai Puer Tur (2017) (ONEHD)
- Club Friday Celeb's Stories (2017) (GMM25)
- Paragit Ruk Series (2017) (Channel 7)
- The Single Mom (2017) (Channel 3)
- Sampat Ruttikan (2018) (GMM25)
- Duang Jai Nai Fai Nhao (2018) (Channel 3)
- Khun Por Jorm Sa (2018) (GMM25)
- Barb Rak (2018) (OneHD)
- Nong Mai Rai Borisut (2018) (Channel 3)
- Songkram Nak Pun (2019) (OneHD)
- Luk Krung (2019) (OneHD)
- Songkram Nak Pun Season 2 (2019) (OneHD)
- Why R U The Series (2020) (OneHD)
- Bad Genius (2020) (OneHD)
- Club Friday The Series 12 (2020) (GMM25)
- Lady Bancham (2020) (OneHD)
- Khun Mae Mafia (2020) (GMM25)
- Ray Ya (2021) (Ch8)
- Tawan Tok Din (2021) (AmarinTV)
- Rak Niran Jantra (2021) (Channel 3)
- The War of Flowers (2022) (GMM25)
- Lay Luntaya (2022) (Channel 8)
- Srisamarn (2022) (Channel 8)
- Suptar 2550 (2022) (Channel 3)
- Fah Than Tawan (2022) (AmarinTV)
- Love at First Night (2024) (Channel 3)
- Muea Tawan Lab Fah (2024) (Channel 3)

=== TV Program ===
- Seub Saded
- Saranair Show
- Bang Cha Kreng
- Ha Cha Kreng
- Rat Chat News
- Nang Yarng Show
- Seub Sadet
- Game Zone
- Fantasy Mee Hang
- Pao Tung
- Samakom Chomdao: The Willy
- I See U
- Bang Chakreng
- Ha Chakreng
- Tore
- Miss Universe Thailand 2014
- Celebrity Game Night Thailand
- I Love Thailand
- BOOM! Thailand
- My Homemade Show
- MY WIFE IS A SINGER
- Win Win War Thailand
- Family Secret
- Pak Lamphong
- The car
- Shopee Game Show
- Tho Chair Mahachon
- Malai Fighter
- WWW OTOP
- Teetaikrua
- APEC QUIZ
- Wanni Ruai
- Rong Kham Wela
- Harama
- Rong Kham Wela
- WIN WIN WAR Junior Season 2
- The real nex gen
- I am Celeb
- Nung Yang Maha PraKieam
