= Thanwa Suriyajak =

Laotian actor, singer, model (born 1990)

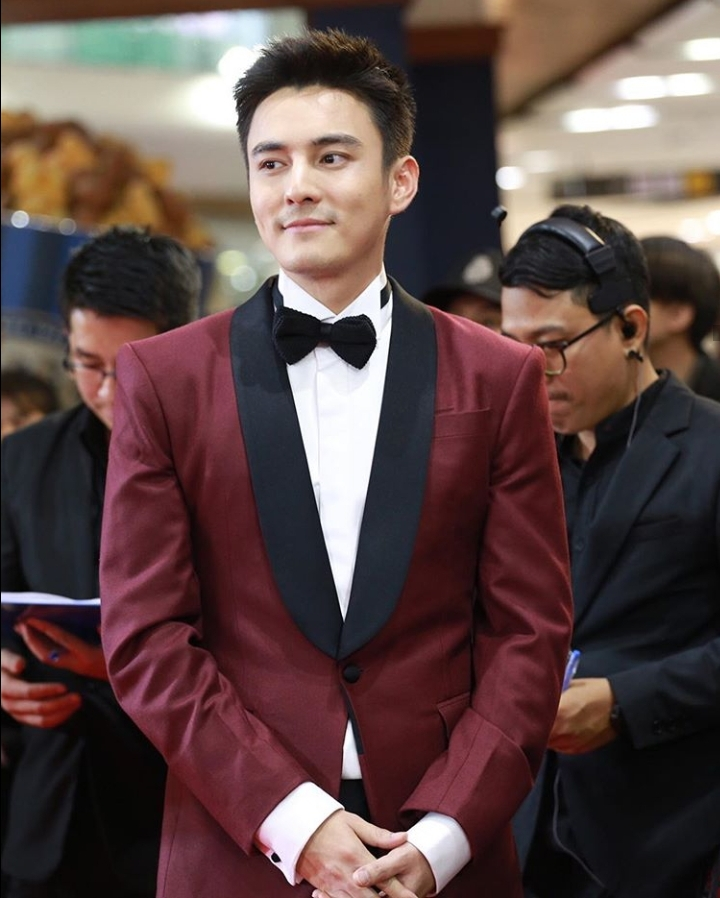
- Thanwa Suriyajak
- Born: December 30, 1990 (age 35); Pakse, Champasak, Laos
- Education: Rangsit University (Film and Video Production)
- Occupations: Actor, singer, YouTuber
- Years active: 2011–present
- Height: 180 cm (5 ft 11 in)

Thanwa Suriyajak (Thai: ธันวา สุริยจักร, also known as Than; born December 30, 1990, in Pakse, Champasak, Laos), is a Laos actor and singer active in Thailand by signing to Channel 7. He is of Thai, Vietnamese, Chinese & French descent. Movies Hugna Sarakham and Love Summer on the Beach were among his debut works in Thailand. Thanwa's popularity has currently been on the rise since his works in Lee La Wa Dee Plerng, Fai Rak Game Ron and Rissaya.

== Early life and education ==
Thanwa was born and raised in Pakse, Champasak, Laos and studied at an international school there before entering the National University in Vientiane. Having a family business in Pakse, Thanwa's father is of Thai, Chinese, & French descent and his mother is of Thai, Chinese, & Vietnamese descent and they also have relatives resided in Ubon Ratchatanee and Bangkok.

Thanwa was scouted into Thai entertainment business by the famous Suppachai Sriwijit talent agents when he visited Thailand during Songkran. Having decided to come to Thailand to work and study, Thanwa began his career when he was 18.

Thanwa graduated with a bachelor's degree in Communication Arts majoring Film and Video production from Rangsit University, Thailand in 2015 and received a scholarship to continue to study a master's degree in Film production at the same university.

== Filmography ==
=== Film ===
Year	Title	Role	Notes
2011	Hug Na Sarakham	Aumnajaroen	
2011	Love Summer on the Beach		

=== Television series ===
Broadcast on Channel 7.

Year	Title	Role	Notes
2011	Mon Rak Mae Num Moon	Can	
2012	Asoon Noi Nai Takiangkaew	Peter	
2012	Look Pu Chai Mai Ta Pod	Krai	
2012	Saeb Sa Lub Kua	Pla Yai	co-lead actor
2013	Wi Marn Ma Prao	Sueb Sai	Lead
2015	Lee La Wa Dee Plerng	Tiwat (Win)	
2015	Waen Sawart	Wisit (Khun Dur)	
2015	Koo Prub Cha Bab Hua Jai	Mawin Pitakpong	
2016	Fai Rak Game Ron	Sueb Sai	Love is Fire The Series
2016	Ta Le Fai	Sueb Sai	Love is Fire The Series
2016	Rissaya	Chanok Korrakotpong	
2017	Dok Yah Nai Pa Yu	Pongrapee	

=== Short film ===
Year	Title	Notes
2013	Long Rak Loey	Actor
2015	Be Together	Director

=== Music video ===
Year	Song	Artist
2015	Nang Sao Thai Gub Fai Kang Kwa	Dunk Pankorn

=== YouTuber ===
Year		Channel
2019	ธันกรีน	YouTube:Thanwa

== Discography ==
=== Soundtrack ===
Year	Song	Note
2011	Look Toong Kon Yark	Mon Rak Mae Num Moon OST
2011	Kuen A Lai	Mon Rak Mae Num Moon OST
2015	Sa Neh Ha	Lee La Wa Dee Plerng OST
2015	Kor Chai Took Natee Gub Tur	Waen Sawart OST
2016	Mai Neuk Loey	Rissaya OST
