= Ann Thongprasom =

Thai actress and producer (born 1976)

Anne Thongprasom
- แอน ทองประสม
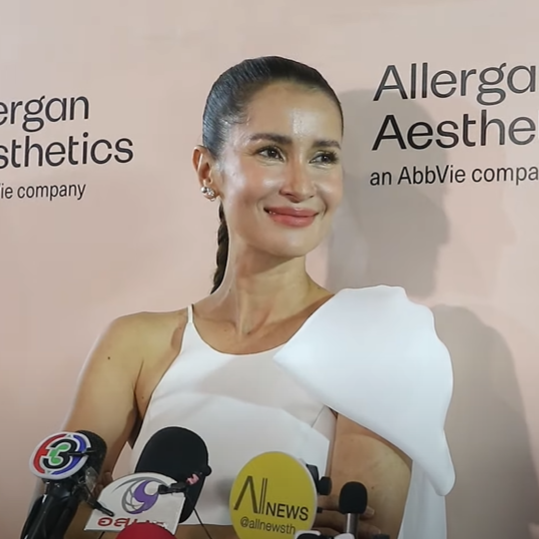
- Thongprasom in 2022
- Born: Srichan Thongprasom; 1 November 1976 (age 49); Bangkok, Thailand
- Other names: Bum (บุ๋ม), Anne, Anne Thong
- Education: Bangkok University; Thammasat University
- Occupations: Actress; television host; producer; YouTuber
- Years active: 1991–present
- Partner: Tinnabhan Tantinirandr

Anne Thongprasom (Thai: แอน ทองประสม; born 1 November 1976) is a Thai actress and producer who was the lead actress in many Thai series during the 2000s. She had the lead role in the 2004 romantic melodrama The Letter: Jod Mai Rak.

== Early life and education ==
Thongprasom is the daughter of a Thai mother and a Swedish father. She received a Bachelor of Arts in Communication degree from Bangkok University, and a Master of Arts in Journalism and Mass Communication from Thammasat University.

== Career ==
Thongprasom came into the entertainment business after being invited to test in a music video by a friend of her mother who was working as a makeup designer for RS Promotion. She was 13 when she featured in her first music video. She went on to star in many more films and television series. Her biggest role was in The Letter: Jod Mai Rak, which earned more than 50 million baht.

== Filmography ==
=== Film ===
Year	Thai title	English title	Role	Production company	Notes	With	Ref.
1992	หอ.หึๆ; Ho Hue Hue	Ghastly Dorm	Sawittree	Five Star Production	Supporting Role		
1992	อนึ่งคิดถึงพอสังเขป; Anueng Khitthueng Pho Sangkhep	I Miss You		Five Star Production	Lead Role		
2004	เดอะเลตเตอร์ จดหมายรัก; The Letter: Jod Mai Rak	The Letter	Dew	Sahamongkol Film International	Lead Role	Attaporn Teemakorn	
2022	บัวผัน ฟันยับ	Bua Pun Fun Yub	Bua-pun	M Pictures	Lead Role	Kanawut Traipipattanapong	

=== Television ===
Year	Thai title	English Title	Role	Network	Ref.
TBA	邵雨薇 Frozen Heart	The Girl of Heart Diamond	Cameo	Channel 3	
2024	หนึ่งในร้อย: One in a Hundred	My Cherie Amour	Producer	Channel 3	
2023	เกมรักทรยศ; Game Ruk Torayot	The Betrayal	Dr. Janepitcha Pattanakit, MD.	Channel 3	
2022	ซุปตาร์ 2550; Suptar 2550	Superstar 2007	Kat	Channel 3	
2021	กะรัตรัก; Karat Ruk	Are We Alright?	Carat	Channel 3	
2015	แอบรักออนไลน์ Ab Ruk Online	Secret Love Online	Awatsaya	Channel 3	
2014	อย่าลืมฉัน; Yah Leum Chan	Forget Me Not	Suriyawadee "Wadee"/Suriyong "Su" Ratachart	Channel 3	
2012	กี่เพ้า; Khi Pao	Qi Pao	Paeka/May Lee	Channel 3	
2010	365วันแห่งรัก; 365 Wun Hae Rak	365 Days of Love	Lanaree "Lan"	Channel 3	
2010	เชลยศักดิ์ Chaloey Sak	Honorable Prisoner	Alisa Santatiwong	Channel 3	
2009	สูตรเสน่หา; Sood Sanae Ha	A Recipe for Love	Alin Tipayada	Channel 3	
2009	สะใภ้ไกลปืนเที่ยง; Sapai Glai Peun Tiang	Underdeveloped Daughter-in-Law	Lalin/Prik	Channel 3	
2009	บริษัทบำบัดแค้น; Borisut Bumbut Kaen	The Revenge Therapy Company	Nongchanai "Nong" Sirin	Channel 3	
2008	สวรรค์เบี่ยง; Sawan Biang	Heaven's Diversion	Narin "Rin"	Channel 3	
2007	ลิขิตกามเทพ; Likit Gammatep	The Fake Cupid	Karnploo	Channel 3	
2006	อุ้มรัก; Oum Ruk	Carrying Love	Napat "Pat"	Channel 3	
2005	แต่ปางก่อน; Tae Pang Korn	The Past Life	Rachawadee/Jao Nang Noi/Andra	Channel 3	
2005	รักละมุนลุ้นละไม; Ruk La Mund Lund La Mai	Sweet Love and Romance	Prawpai (Chayanee)	Channel 3	
2004	นางฟ้าไร้ปีก; Nag Fah Rai Peek	Angel Without Wings	Namwan/Siparng	Channel 3	
2004	ละครที่รัก; Lakorn Tee Ruk			Channel 3	
2003	นางโชว์ Nang Show	Show Girls	Sri Thong	Channel 3	
2002	เสื้อสีฝุ่น	Seur See Foon	Aul	Channel 3	
2001	สามีตีตรา	Samee Thee Thra	Garat	Channel 3	
2001	แรงเงา	Raeng Ngao	Moonin / Mootha	Channel 3	
2001	สุดดวงใจ	Sood Duang Jai	Patcha	Channel 3	
2000	รัตติกาลยอดรัก	Rattikarn Yod Ruk	Rattikarn/Porndao	Channel 3	
2000	มณีหยาดฟ้า	Manee Yard Fah	Princess Ariya	Channel 3	
1999	ปัญญาชนก้นครัว	Punyachon Kon Krua	Cha Aim/Amika	Channel 3	
1999	เจ้าสาวปริศนา	Jao Sao Prissana	Rada	Channel 3	
1998	คุณหนูอารมณ์ร้ายกับผู้ชายปากแข็ง	Khun Nu Arome Rai Kub Poo Chai Pak Kang	Runya	Channel 3	
1998	จากฝันสู่นิรันดร	Jark Fun Su Nirandon	Karaged	Channel 3	
1997	สายรุ้ง	Sai Rung	Methinee	Channel 3	
1997	สองนรี	Song Naree	Panitee "Neung"/Paniti "Song"/Panitee	Channel 3	
1996	สามใบไม่เถา	Sam Bai Mai Thow	Inn Thu Orn (Inn)	Channel 3	
1993	ไผ่ลอดกอ	Fai Lod Kor	Kiing Phai	Channel 3	
1993	เวลาในขวดแก้ว	Vela Nai Khout Kaew	Jorm	Channel 3	

=== As producer ===
Year	Thai Title	English Title	Network	Notes	Ref.
2012	ปัญญาชนก้นครัว; Punya Chon Kon Krua	The Kitchen Scholar	Channel 3	1st lakorn as a producer under Thong Entertainment (High Rated)	
2014	สามีตีตรา; Samee Tee Tra	The Marked Husband	Channel 3	2nd lakorn under Thong Entertainment; High Rated	
2015	แอบรักออนไลน์ Ab Ruk Online	Secret Love Online	Channel 3	3rd lakorn under Thong Entertainment	
2016	เพียงชายคนนี้ Piang Chai Kon Nee Mai Chai Poo Wised	Just A Man, Not A Magician	Channel 3	4th lakorn under Thong Entertainment; Remake to 2001's Samee Ngern Phon	
2018	ลิขิตรัก; Likit Ruk	The Crown Princess	Channel 3	5th lakron under Thong Entertainment	
2020	อกเกือบหักแอบรักคุณสามี Ok Keub Hak Ab Ruk Khun Samee	My Husband in Law	Channel 3	6th lakorn under Thong Entertainment; High Rated; Based on a Novel; Major project celebrating CH3 50th anniversary	
2022	คือเธอ; Keu Tur, It's You	Bad Romeo	Channel 3	7th lakorn under Thong Entertainment	
2023	แค้น; Kaen	Nobody's Happy if I'm Not	Channel 3	8th lakorn under Thong Entertainment	
2024	หนึ่งในร้อย: One in a Hundred	My Cherie Amour		6th lakorn under Thong Entertainment	
TBA	邵雨薇 Frozen Heart	The Girl of Heart Diamond		10th Nine Entertain Award Ice Skating (with Mario Maurer and Ivy Shao )	
