= Sunset at Chaophraya =

Sunset at Chaophraya may refer to:

- Sunset at Chaophraya (1996 film), a Thai film by Euthana Mukdasanit
- Sunset at Chaophraya (2013 film), a 2013 Thai film by Kittikorn Liasirikun

== See also ==
- Khu Kam, a Thai novel written by Thommayanti
