= List of awards and nominations received by Nadech Kugimiya =

Nadech Kugimiya is a Thai actor who has received numerous awards, including the Suphannahong National Film Award, the Thai Film Critics Association Awards, the Thai Film Directors Association Awards, the Golden Television Award, the Kom Chad Luek Awards, the Nataraja Awards, the Nine Entertain Awards, and the Siam Dara Star Awards.

Nadech made his acting debut in the drama Ngao Rak Luang Jai (2010), for which he received the Siam Dara Star Awards for Best New Actor. In the same year, he landed his first leading role in the drama Duang Jai Akkanee (2010), for which he received Best New Actor awards from several institutions and also received nominations for the Kom Chad Luek Awards, Golden Television Awards, Nataraja Awards, and Siam Dara Star Awards for Best Actor. The following year, he received his first Nataraja Award for his performance in the drama Game Rai Game Rak (2011). In 2013, his performance in his debut film, Sunset at Chaophraya, earned him the Best Actor awards from the Suphannahong National Film Awards, the Bangkok Critics Assembly Awards, and the Starpics Thai Film Awards. The following year, he took on the lead role in the drama Roy Fun Tawan Deard (2014), for which he received his first Golden Television Award and his third Nataraja Award.

== Awards and nominations ==
Awards and nominations received by Jake Gyllenhaal
Awards	Years	Recipient	Category	Results	Ref.
Kerd Awards	2012	Nadech Kugimiya	Kerd Ma Priang	Won	
Kerd Awards	2012	Game Rai Game Rak	Khu Kerd (with Urassaya Sperbund)	Won	
Kom Chad Luek Awards	2011	Duangjai Akkanee	Best Leading Actor – Television Dramas	Nominated	
Kom Chad Luek Awards	2012	Game Rai Game Rak	Best Leading Actor – Television Dramas	Nominated	
Kom Chad Luek Awards	2012	Nadech Kugimiya	Popular Male Actor	Won	
Kom Chad Luek Awards	2013	Nadech Kugimiya	Popular Male Actor	Nominated	
Kom Chad Luek Awards	2014	Sunset at Chaophraya	Best Actor – Motion Picture	Won	
Kom Chad Luek Awards	2014	Nadech Kugimiya	Popular Male Actor	Nominated	
Kom Chad Luek Awards	2015	Nadech Kugimiya	Popular Male Actor	Won	
Kom Chad Luek Awards	2016	Lom Sorn Rak	Best Leading Actor – Television Drama	Nominated	
Kom Chad Luek Awards	2016	Nadech Kugimiya	Popular Male Actor	Won	
Kom Chad Luek Awards	2017	ตามรักคืนใจ	Best Leading Actor – Television Drama	Won	
Kom Chad Luek Awards	2017	Nadech Kugimiya	Popular Male Actor	Nominated	
Kom Chad Luek Awards	2019	Nadech Kugimiya	Popular Male Actor	Nominated	
Kom Chad Luek Awards	2021	The Con-Heartist	Best Actor – Motion Picture	Won	
Kom Chad Luek Awards	2022	To Me, It's Simply You	Best Leading Actor – Television Dramas	Nominated	
Kom Chad Luek Awards	2023	Nadech Kugimiya	Popular Couple (with Urassaya Sperbund)	Nominated	
Kazz Awards	2012	Nadech Kugimiya	Male Superstar of the Year	Won	
Kazz Awards	2014	Nadech Kugimiya	Male Superstar of the Year	Won	
Kazz Awards	2014	Nadech Kugimiya	Couple of the Year (with Urassaya Sperbund)	Nominated	
Kazz Awards	2015	Nadech Kugimiya	Male Superstar of the Year	Won	
Kazz Awards	2016	Nadech Kugimiya	Male Popular Vote	Nominated	
Crow Love Like Awards	2013	Nadech Kugimiya	Super Popular of Crow	Won	
G Member Awards	2010	Nadech Kugimiya	The Best Fashion Image Magazine of the Year	Won	
G Member Awards	2013	"Hai Ruk Mun To Nai Jai"	Best Drama Song of the Year	Nominated	
G Member Awards	2015	"Laew Rao Ja Dai Ruk Kan Mai"	Best Drama Song of the Year (with Urassaya Sperbund)	Won	
Bangkok Critics Assembly Awards	2014	Sunset at Chaophraya	Best Leading Actor	Won	
Bangkok Critics Assembly Awards	2021	The Con-Heartist	Best Leading Actor	Nominated	
Seventeen Choice Awards	2010	Nadech Kugimiya	Hot Guy of the Year	Won	
Seventeen Choice Awards	2011	Nadech Kugimiya	Hot Guy of the Year	Won	
Seventeen Choice Awards	2013	Nadech Kugimiya	Male Actor of the Year	Won	
Seventeen Choice Awards	2014	Nadech Kugimiya	Star of the Year	Won	
Seed Awards	2015	"Laew Rao Ja Dai Ruk Kan Mai"	The Hottest Song of the Year (with Urassaya Sperbund)	Won	
Secret Magazine	2013	Nadech Kugimiya	Secret Idol	Won	
Daily Star The Great Awards	2011	Duangjai Akkanee	Best Rising Male Star of the Year	Nominated	
Daily Star The Great Awards	2011	Nadech Kugimiya	Hot Guy of the Year	Nominated	
Daily Star The Great Awards	2013	Torranee Ni Nee Krai Krong	Best Leading Actor in a Drama of the Year	Won	
Daily Star The Great Awards	2013	Nadech Kugimiya	Hot Guy of the Year	Won	
Daily Star The Great Awards	2014	Rang Prattana	Best Leading Actor in a Drama of the Year	Nominated	
Daily Star The Great Awards	2014	Sunset at Chaophraya	Best Leading Actor in a Film of the Year	Nominated	
Daily Star The Great Awards	2014	Nadech Kugimiya	Hot Guy of the Year	Won	
Daily Star The Great Awards	2014	Nadech Kugimiya	The Front Page News Favorite of the Year	Nominated	
Daily Star The Great Awards	2015	Roy Fun Tawan Deard	Best Leading Actor in a Drama of the Year	Nominated	
Daily Star The Great Awards	2015	Nadech Kugimiya	Hot Guy of the Year	Nominated	
Daily Star The Great Awards	2016	Lom Sorn Rak	Best Leading Actor in a Drama of the Year	Nominated	
Daily Star The Great Awards	2016	Nadech Kugimiya	Hot Guy of the Year	Nominated	
Daily Star The Great Awards	2017	Nadech Kugimiya	Hot Guy of the Year	Won	
Daily Star The Great Awards	2018	Leh Lub Salub Rarng	Best Leading Actor in a Drama of the Year	Won	
Daily Star The Great Awards	2018	Nadech Kugimiya	Hot Guy of the Year	Nominated	
Daily Star The Great Awards	2018	Nadech Kugimiya	Male Popular Vote	Nominated	
Daily Star The Great Awards	2019	Nakee 2	Best Leading Actor in a Film of the Year	Won	
