= Chatborirak =

Chatborirak (Thai: ฉัตรบริรักษ์) is a Thai surname. Notable people with the surname include:

- Pakorn Chatborirak (born 1984), Thai actor and model
- Pat Chatborirak (born 1989), Thai actor and model
- Thana Chatborirak (born 1987), Thai actor and model
