= Udom Taepanich =

Thai comedian (born 1968)

Udom Taephanich
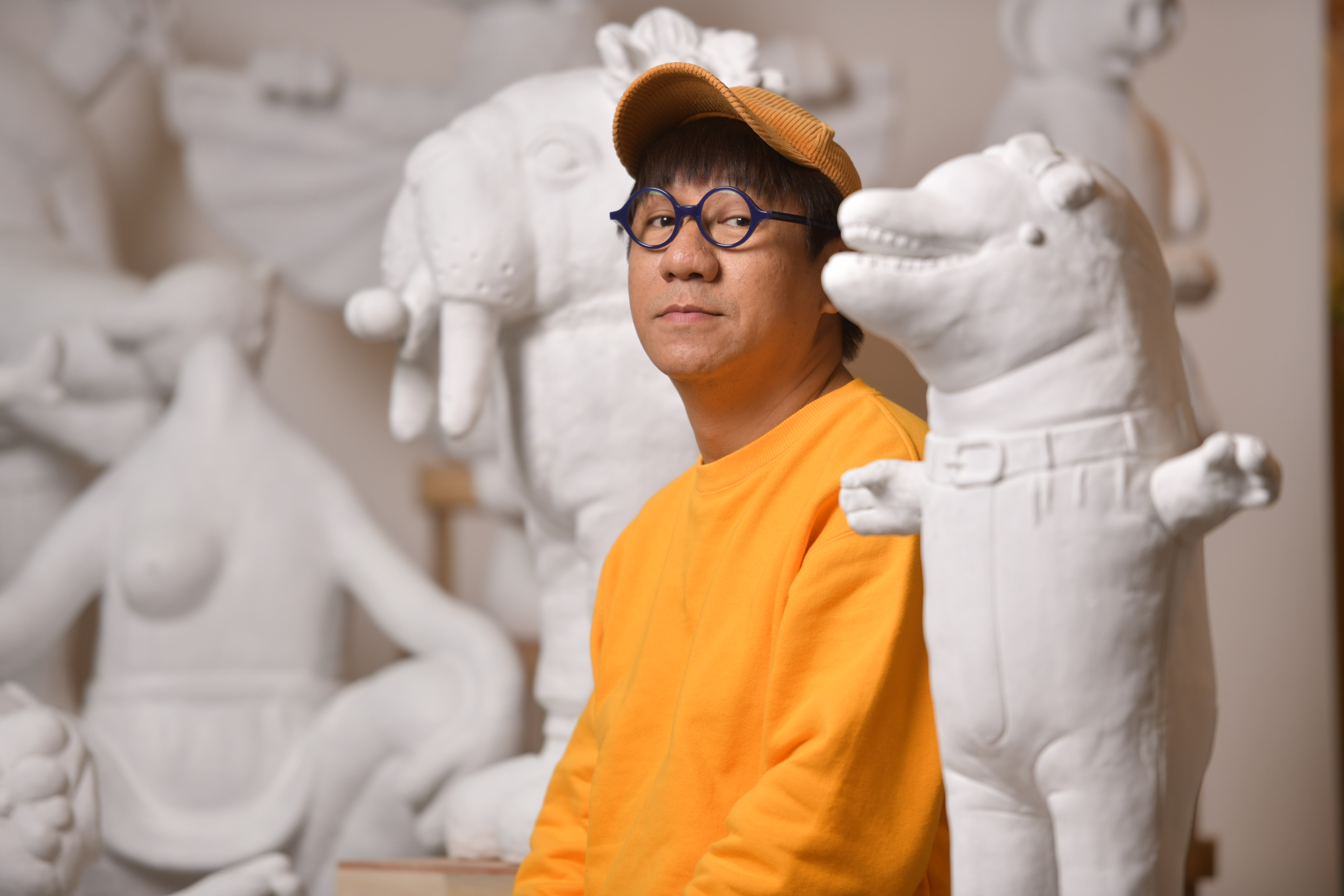
- Born: 1 September 1968 (age 58); Ban Bueng, Chonburi, Thailand
- Occupations: Comedian, Writer, Artist
- Height: 1.70 m (5 ft 7 in)

Udom Taephanich (Thai: อุดม แต้พานิช; RTGS: Udom Taephanit), also stage name Note, is a Thai stand-up comedian, artist and writer.

Taephanich was named as "One of the Best Persons of the Century in Performing Arts" by Nation Publishing Group in 2000. He is well known for his stand-up comedy series Deaw 1-16.

== Biography ==
Udom Taephanich was born on 1 September 1968, in Chonburi, Thailand, to Tongsuk Arilon and Somjit Taepanich. He is the second of three children.

Udom Taephanich graduated from Wat Salaloy Municipality 2 School for primary school, Surawittayakarn School in Surin Province for junior high, and earned a vocational certification from Chonburi Vocational College, Chonburi Province. He also studied Arts at Pohchang Academy of Arts for two years.

Udom Taephanich began his first career as a comic artist at Chaiyapruek, magazine of Thai Wattanapanich, using the alias as ‘Note Namun’ (โน้ต หน้ามึน). He later joined Paiyalyai Magazine, published by Sitsadue Publishing, where he worked as a member of art team, designing illustrations and magazine covers. He also made his acting debut as 'an old man in the hospital' in Sitsadue's soap opera named Malai's love in ICU. Inspired by Paiyalyai Magazine, he developed an interest in writing and went on to publish his first book Once in a Lifetime with Watermelon Smoothie (ครั้งหนึ่งในชีวิตกับแตงโมปั่น). His success as a writer led to his promotion within the magazine.

Starting in 1993, Udom joined the Yutthakarn Kayubnguek Team.

In 1995, Udom launched a live stand-up comedy series called Deaw. By April 2022, the series had thirteen shows. In 2024, two additional shows Sit Down with Stand Up and Deaw Special were released on NetflixUd created a special program called Moo, featuring himself and other Thai celebrities performing stand-up comedy as well as showcasing their artistic talents. He is widely regarded as one of the most famous comedians in Thailand.

Additionally, Udom starred as the lead actor in the 1998 film Box (กล่อง) directed by Chatrichalerm Yukol.

In 2019, Udom released several singles, "Long Rak", "Long Ruay", "Rong Cham", and "Long Joh" under the name DTK BOY BAND, in collaboration with Kong Huayrai and Singto Namchok.

In 2024, Udom faced lèse-majesté charges over his comments regarding the sufficiency economy theory introduced by King Bhumibol Adulyadej.

== Deaw - Stand Up Comedy Show ==
Directing and Script Writing by Udom Taephanich - operated by Podee Panich Co., Ltd. since 1995

No.	Name	Showtime	Location	Number of performances
1	One Stand Up Comedy	23–25 August 1995	Muang Thai Life Assurance Auditorium; Muang Thai - Phatra Complex Building	3
2	One Stand Up Comedy 2 (อุดม โชว์ห่วย)	1–14 October 1996	Muang Thai Life Assurance Auditorium; Muang Thai - Phatra Complex Building	14
3	One Stand Up Comedy 3 (อุดม การช่าง)	1–22 October 1997	Imperial World Ladprao	22
4	One Stand Up Comedy 4	1–28 October 1999	MCC Hall The Mall Bangkapi	28
5	One Stand Up Comedy 5 (ฉายเดี่ยว)	1–30 October 2002	Scala Cinema	30
6	One Stand Up Comedy 6 (ตูดหมึก)	1 October – 12 November 2003	Scala Cinema	43
7	One Stand Up Comedy 7 (ร้าน เซเว่น เดี่ยว)	1 February – 2 March 2008	Scala Cinema	41 (Thailand 39 shows, Sydney 2 shows)
7	One Stand Up Comedy 7.5 (เชียงใหม่ม่วนขนาด) (ร้าน เซเว่นพอยท์ไฟว์ เดี่ยว)	19–20 July 2008	Kad Theatre Chiang Mai	3
8	Stand Up Comedy 8	4–16 February 2010	Royal Paragon Hall Siam Paragon	13
8	Stand Up Comedy with Tan (With: Tan Passakornnatee)	5–7 November 2010	Scala Cinema	5
9	Stand Up Comedy 9 (สนุก สันติ อหิงสา)	5–18 August 2011	Royal Paragon Hall Siam Paragon	18
9	Stand Up Comedy 9.5 (สนุก สันติ อหิงสา ไม่แพ้กัน) One Stand Up Comedy 9.5 Chiangmai Story	16–20 September 2011	Kad Theatre Chiang Mai	5
10	Stand Up Comedy 10	15–31 March 2013	Royal Paragon Hall Siam Paragon	17
10	Stand Up Comedy 10 LIVE IN CHIANG MAI	31 May – 2 June 2013	Kad Theatre Chiang Mai	3
11	Note Udom No.11 - Stand Up Comedy 11	11–27 September 2015	Royal Paragon Hall Siam Paragon	16
11	Moo Variety Show Udom and Friends (หมู่ วาไรตี้โชว์ อุดมและผองเพื่อน) (With: Palmy, Joke So Cool, Toon Bodyslam, Golf F.Hero, Two Popetorn, Noi Nuttanee Sittisamarn, Joey Boy and Singto Namchok)	3–11 September 2016	Royal Paragon Hall Siam Paragon	9
12	Note Udom No.12 - Stand Up Comedy 12	3–12 August 2018	Royal Paragon Hall Siam Paragon	13
13	Singer Proudly Presents "Thai Standup Comedy : Deaw 13"	10–19 June 2022	Royal Paragon Hall Siam Paragon	10
13	Jaymart Group Presents Moo 2 (With: Palmy, Joke So Cool, Two Popetorn, Singto Namchok, Bella Ranee, Kong Huayrai, Tha Kanit, Kan Napat and Nont Tanont)	4–9 October 2022	True Icon Hall ICONSIAM	6
No number	Deaw Special : Super Soft Power	1 May 2024	Netflix	
14	Deaw still alive	8 – 12 October 2025	Paragon hall, Siam Paragon	5

== Art & Creativity ==
Taephanich is a multifaceted artist whose creative talents extend beyond his work as a comedian to include visual art. He is known for creating sculptures using materials such as bronze, ceramic, fiberglass, iron, and wood, as well as producing engravings, paintings, and tapestries. His artwork blends humor, wit, and social commentary, often exploring themes related to human nature and Thai society. Drawing inspiration from his personal experiences, including encounters with military authorities, Taephanich uses his art to address both lighthearted and serious social issues. His ability to combine comedy with visual art allows him to engage audiences with both humor and insight, prompting reflection on societal issues and individual perspectives. His art pieces can be found on the Domdingdong website and Instagram Domdingdong, where they are showcased to a broader audience.

== Performance ==
=== Films ===
Year	Title
1989	Suthee
1992	Big, Bigger & Bigger
1998	Box
2006	Loveaholic
2007	Bus Lane (film)
2008	Candid Filming One Stand Up Comedy 7 (แอบถ่าย เดี่ยว 7)
2008	Kill Tim
2009	Dreamaholic
2018	2,215

=== Soap Operas ===
Year	Title
1992	Roy Thang Hang Kwarm Fun (รอยทางแห่งความฝัน)
1994	Wa-woon (ว้าวุ่น)
2016	Needy Daddy (DADDY จำเป็น)

=== Music Videos ===
Year	Title	Artist
1992	Kao Jai Kan Noi (Ouch) (เข้าใจหน่อย (โอ๊ย))	Itti Balangura
1997	Tim (ติ๋ม)	Moderndog
2006	U & ME	Saliva Bastards

=== Television ===
Year	Title	Channel
1990 - 1992	Ching Roi Ching Lan (ชิงร้อยชิงล้าน)	Channel 7 (Thailand)
1991 - 1995	Yut-tha-gan Kha-yap Ngeuak (ยุทธการขยับเหงือก)	Channel 5 (Thailand)
1992	Midnight Cha-Cha-Cha (มิดไนท์ชะชะช่า)	Channel 7 (Thailand)

== Writing Works ==
Besides his acting career, Udom Taephanich has also authored 21 books, some of which have been translated into foreign languages, including

- Tot Than Tee Roo Jak Kan (โทษฐานที่รู้จักกัน)
- One Stand Up Comedy 1 (เดี่ยวไมโครโฟน 1)
- Nudity Book (หนังสือโป๊)
- One Stand Up Comedy Show Huay (เดี่ยวไมโครโฟนโชว์ห่วย)
- Notebook (โน้ตบุ๊ค)
- Mixed Taephanich (รวมมิตรแต้พานิช)
- Kon Klong (ก้นกล่อง)
- Deaw 4 (เดี่ยว 4)
- GU 1 (Garbage of Udom)
- GU 2 (Garbage of Udom)
- GU 3 (Garbage of Udom)
- GU 123 (Garbage of Udom)
- Shine Deaw (ฉายเดี่ยว)
- I don’t know
- a dom (นิตยสารแนวล้อเลียน)
- Tood Muke (ตูดหมึก)
- GU 123 (ฉบับญี่ปุ่น) ISBN 9749340043
- a dom 2
- Domcumentary
- Dom Di (ดมได) (2011)

== Music ==
=== Solo ===
==== Album ====
Name	Detail	Title
A collection of songs for this and that by Udom: Listen before watching Udom Karn Chang (รวมเพลงประกอบโน่นประกอบนี่ของอุดม ฟังก่อนชม อุดมการช่าง)	Format: Cassette Tape / CD	1. Fan (พัดลม); 2. Lots of Friends (เพื่อนเพียบ); 3. Arai Kor Mai Roo (อะไรก็ไม่รู้); 4. Pai Lom Rak (ผายลมรัก); 5. Rak Lab (รักหลับ); 6. Udom Karn Chang (อุดมการช่าง); 7. Hungry (หิว); 8. Rean Mai Keng (เรียนไม่เก่ง); 9. Lots of Friends (Rehearsal) (เพื่อนเพียบ (ซ้อม)); 10. Fan (พัดลม) (Toilet Mix); 11. Lae Harn Song (แหล่หารสอง); 12. Yawning.. (หาว..)

==== Others ====
Year	Title	Album
1996	Lae Harn Song (แหล่หารสอง)	Featured in the advertisement 'Sharing Power in Half' (ประกอบโฆษณา รวมพลังหารสอง)
—N/a	Kwam Rak Tam Hai Kon Ta Dee (ความรักทำให้คนตาดี)	Pleng Baab Prapas - Pliean Chark by Prapas Cholsaranon (เพลงแบบประภาส - เปลี่ยนฉาก โดย ประภาส ชลศรานนท์)
2558	Sud Swing Ringo Ee-To Bump (สุดสวิงริงโก้อีโต้บั๊มพ์)	Featured in Deaw Stand Up Comedy 11 (เดี่ยว 11)

=== DTK BOY BAND ===
A collective music by Udom Taephanich, Singto Namchoke, and Kong Huayrai

==== Single ====
Year	Title	Album
2019	Long Rak (ลองรัก)	No album
2019	Long Ruay (ลองรวย)	No album
2020	Rong Cham (รองช้ำ)	No album
2021	Kuen Gu Sa (Long Tuang)(คืนกูสา (ลองทวง))	No album
2024	Long Joh (ลองโจ๊ะ)	No album

== Directorial Works ==
- MV Long Rak (ลองรัก) - DTK BOY BAND - 2019
- MV Long Ruay (ลองรวย)- DTK BOY BAND - 2019
- MV Rong Cham (รองช้ำ) - DTK BOY BAND - 2563
- Official Lyric Video Rong Cham (รองช้ำ) - DTK BOY BAND - 2020
- MV Kuen Gu Sa (Long Tuang)(คืนกูสา (ลองทวง)) - DTK Thai Baan Project (ไทบ้านโปรเจ็กต์) - 2021
- Advertisement - SINGER 'A Single Card Can Simplify A Burden' (หนักไปให้เราช่วยด้วยบัตรใบเดียว) - 2021
- Advertisement - SINGER 'Does this really exist?' (อย่างนี้ก็มีด้วยเหรอ?) - 2021

== Exhibition ==
- ART? - Na Phra Lan, Bangkok, 1998
- Ya Ra-bai (ยาระบาย) - About Cafe, Bangkok, 1999
- Udom on Canvas - Room Service, Bangkok, 2000
- Voodoo Gudo - Toh Kim, Bangkok, 2001
- The Painting I Like - Gongdee Gallery, Chiang Mai, 2002
- Art Against War - Art Dharma Tunnel, Chiang Mai, 2003
- Free-dom - Ega Gallery, Chiang Mai, 2004
- Yokohama Triennale 2005 - Yamashita Pier, Yokohama, Japan, 2005
- Domcumentary - J Gallery, J Avenue Thonglor, Sukhumvit 55, Bangkok. Exhibition: 2–31 July 2006
- PLAT FORM new media lab - The work titled Dark Conversation is an interactive piece created in collaboration with Pornthaveesak Rimsakul. It was held at the Art and Cultural Center of the Science and Technology Information Institute (Central Library) of Chulalongkorn University, Bangkok from 23 November – 16 December 2006.
- Project Zero - Central World, Bangkok. Exhibition: 9 – 14 June 2007
- Myspace - FAT FESTIVEL#7 - Challenger Hall 2-3, Muang Thong Thani, Nonthaburi. Exhibition: 10–11 November 2007
- CHANGE - Hof Art, Bangkok, 2008
- No Wall : Art and Friendship - Council Printing House (โรงพิมพ์คุรุสภาเก่า), Bangkok. Exhibition: 16-30 August 2008
- Kerene (ขี้เหร่เนะ) - J Gallery, J Avenue Thonglor, Sukhumvit 55, Bangkok. Exhibition: 23 October – 5 November 2008
- Rapper - Gallerian N Lumpini, Bangkok. Exhibition: 14 November – 23 December 2008
- Supernormality - J Gallery, J Avenue Thonglor, Sukhumvit 55, Bangkok. Exhibition: 31 July – 13 August 2009
- I Need A Life Coach - Trendy Gallery River City, Bangkok. 21 May – 24 July 2022
- Lost in DOMLand - Solo Art Exhibition - Icon Siam, Bangkok, 7 June - 3 August 2025

== Charity ==
- Taephanich has participated in and supported the Luuk Rieang Vulnerable Group since January 2013.

No.	Activity	Location	Date
1	Taephanich visited Luuk Rieang for the first time to stay with them for a period of five days.	Old Luuk Rieang Home, Yala	January, 2013
2	The activities involve the construction of a bathroom, the acquisition of a new house, and the renovation of the house to improve living conditions for children.	Luuk Rieang Home, Yala	October, 2013
3	ABC Chiang Mai Trip	Chiang Mai	February, 2014
4	A talk show - Stand Up Comedy was organized for 2,500 students of Yala Rajabhat University, with free admission.	Yala Rajabhat University Auditorium, Yala	28 October 2014
5	A surprise visit on Children's Day in conjunction with the safe and creative space activities organized by Luuk Rieang.	Yala Rajabhat University Auditorium, Yala	7 January 2016
6	Supported and sponsored 100 children from Luuk Rieang to attend Deaw 10-12 and Moo Variety.	Royal Paragon Hall, Siam Paragon	2013-2018
7	Luuk Rieang Trip at Samed Island	Samed Island, Rayong	25 August 2017
8	A talk show was organized to uplift and bring joy to the paramilitary rangers of the 33rd Ranger Regiment Task Force.	33rd Ranger Regiment Task Force, Yala	13 October 2018
9	Creating happiness during school breaks through art: teaching children to create artwork to raise funds for their education.	Luuk Rieang Home, Yala	15 October 2018
10	Visited families affected by challenges, providing assistance in renovating and building homes, as well as supplying necessary amenities.	Bangkok	August, 2018
11	Implemented an initiative to cultivate happiness and well-being within the Luuk Rieang group.	Rayong	24-27 April 2019
12	Appointed representatives to visit children affected by hardships, providing financial support and toys on National Children's Day 2018.	Krong Pinang Hospital, Yala	2018
13	Mobilized over 300 tons of rice for village health volunteers (VHVs) in the three southern border provinces through the program 'Talad Jai'.	Yala, Patttani, Narathiwat	April 2020
14	Brought joy and smiles to the children of Luuk Rieang Home together with Toon Bodyslam and Koy Rachwin.	Luuk Rieang Home, Yala	24 August 2020
15	ABC8 CSR Luuk Rieang episode 2 at Samui Island - took 100 children from Luuk Rieang to Samui Island for a beach trip, engaging in life skills activities and creating art.	Samui Island, Suratthani	21-25 October 2021
16	Luuk Rieang Trip at Samed Island	Samed Island, Rayong	22-24 October 2024

- Participated in the project 'Kao Kon La Kao (Step for Each Other) (ก้าวคนละก้าว): For 11 Hospitals Nationwide in November - December, 2018. Kao Kon La Kao Foundation established by Toon Bodyslam
- Broadcast a live Nano concert for 6 hours, raising 3.5 million baht for the recovery efforts in Ubon Ratchathani after the floods in October, 2019.
- Organized the DTK LIVE IN Ubon event with the theme 'Eat for Free, Watch for Free, Enjoy for Free' (กินฟรี เบิ่งฟรี ม่วนฟรี)
- In April 2020, the 'Talad Jai' program was launched via social media as a platform to support medical personnel during the COVID-19 pandemic in Thailand, raising a total of 44 million baht in donations.

== Awards ==
The various works created by Udom Taephanich have led to recognition from many media outlets, praising Udom Taephanich as an important figure who has contributed to societal development. He has received numerous awards, such as...

- In 1997, he was selected as Person of the Year by the Jutprakai column of the Bangkok Business newspaper.
- In 1999, The Nation newspaper's special issue selected Udom Taephanich as one of the 100 people of the century in the field of acting.
- In 1999, Hi Class magazine named Udom Taephanich as one of the 50 most influential thinkers in Thailand.
- In 2006, Udom Taephanich received the Kom Chad Luek Award for Best Leading Actor for his role in the film Loveaholic
- In 2008, Udom Taephanich was nominated for the 16th Entertainment Critics Association Awards in the Best Leading Actor category for his role in the film Bus Lane (film)
- In 2012, Udom Taephanich was nominated for the Koed Award of the Year at the first Koed Awards event.
- In 2012, Udom Taephanich was selected as the Most Talked About Person Online of the Year by Mthai (Top Talk About Guy).
- In 2013, Udom Taephanich received the 14th Thep Thong Award on 23 April 2013, in the category of Outstanding Television and Radio Personality. He was recognized for his contributions to society and his widely acknowledged work, especially in Stand Up Comedy performances.
- In 2017, Udom Taephanich was nominated for the award of Most Influential Social Figure Not Using Social Media at the first Elle Men's Social Media Awards, organized by Elle Men magazine. (Elle Men’s Social Influencers who Don’t Use Social Media)
