= Kugimiya =

Kugimiya is a Japanese surname. Notable people with the surname include:

- Nadech Kugimiya (ณเดชน์ คูกิมิยะ) (born 1991), Thai model and actor
- Rie Kugimiya (釘宮 理恵) (born 1979), Japanese voice actress and singer
