= Apasiri Nitibhon =

Thai supermodel and actress

- อาภาศิริ นิติพน
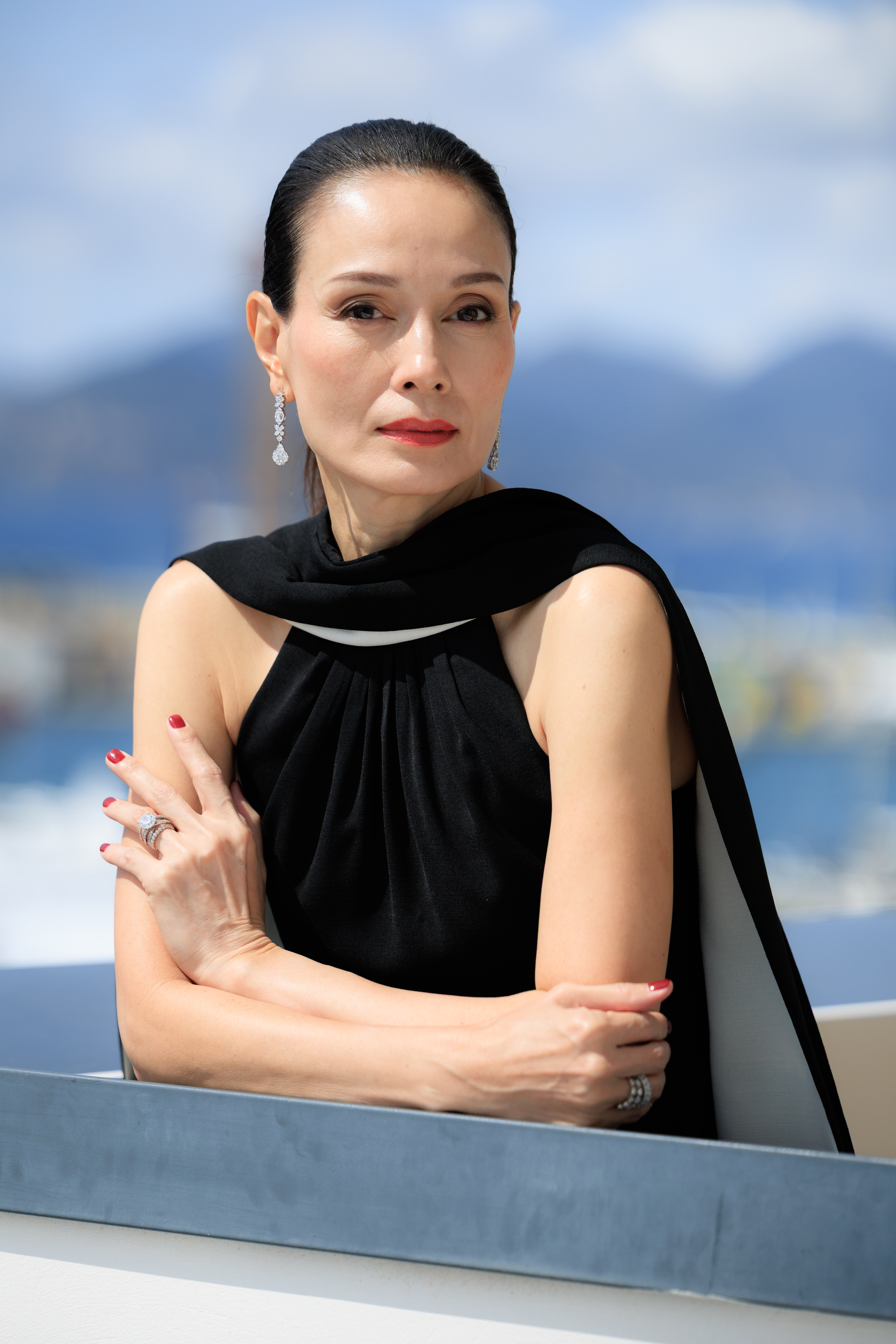
- Apasiri in May 2025
- Born: 14 September 1971 (age 55); Bangkok, Thailand
- Other name: Aum
- Education: School of Humanities and Tourism Management Bangkok University
- Occupations: Actress; model
- Notable work: Sunset at Chaophraya (1996)
- Height: 1.74 m (5 ft 8 1/2 in)
- Spouse: Banjong Chantrasmi (m. 2009)

Apasiri Nitibhon (Thai: อาภาศิริ นิติพน, RTGS: Aphasiri Nitiphon; born 14 September 1971), nickname Um (อุ๋ม), is a Thai supermodel and actress. Among her starring roles is as Angsumalin in Sunset at Chaophraya in 1996. She has also been featured in Bullet Wives and The Victim.

Apasiri trained as a likay dancer in her youth. For the 2006 film, The Victim, she portrayed a beauty queen who performs a likay dance. For this role, she had to receive a refresher course in Thai classical dance.

She is younger sister of Amarin Nitibhon, a Thai singer and actor and aunt of Achiraya Nitibhon, also singer and actress.

== Filmography ==
=== Film ===
| Year | Title | Role | Notes | Ref. |
|---|---|---|---|---|
| 1996 | Sunset at Chaopraya | Angsumalin Chalasin | Main role | |
| 2005 | The Bullet Wives | Bow | Supporting role | |
| 2006 | The Victim | Meen / Oom | Main role | |
| 2009 | Phobia 2 | Pe's Mother | Supporting role | |
| 2012 | Suddenly It's Magic | Mrs. Hanson | Supporting role | |
| 2019 | Dew | Dew's Mom | Supporting role | |
| 2019 | Happy Old Year | Jean & Jay's Mom | Supporting role | |
| 2025 | A Useful Ghost | Suman | Main role | |

=== Television ===
| Year | Title | Role | Channel | Notes | Ref. |
|---|---|---|---|---|---|
| 1999 | Mue Puen | Kusuma [Thanu's new wife] | Channel 3 | Main role | |
| 2009 | Kuan Kammathep | Nuannoi | Channel 3 | Supporting role | |
| 2013 | Hormones: The Series | Kwan's mother | One 31 | Supporting role | |
| 2013 | Suparburoot Look Poochai | Ramphai | Channel 7 | Supporting role | |
| 2013 | Ruk Sutrit | Naruedee | Channel 3 | Guest role | |
| 2014 | Hormones Season 2 | Kwan's mother | One 31 | Supporting role | |
| 2014 | ThirTEEN Terrors | Nae's Mother | | Main role | |
| 2014 | Sam Bai Mai Thao | Bparalee | Channel 3 | Supporting role | |
| 2015 | Leh Ratree | Karuna [Poo's mother] | One 31 | Supporting role | |
| 2015 | Prissana | Samorn Suthakul | PPTV HD | Supporting role | |
| 2015 | Gossip Girl: Thailand | Ann | Channel 3 | Guest role | |
| 2015 | Club Friday The Series Season 6: Pid Tee... Ruk Kon Lok Luang | Wandee | GMM 25 | Main role | |
| 2015 | Jao Sao Kong Arnon | Samorn Suthakul | PPTV HD | Supporting role | |
| 2016 | O-Negative | Prim's mother | GMM 25 | Supporting role | |
| 2017 | Tawan Yor Saeng | Yai | Channel 3 | Supporting role | |
| 2017 | Lakorn Khon | Leela | GMM 25 | Supporting role | |
| 2017 | Mia Luang | Khun Ying Waewwan | Channel 3 | Supporting role | |
| 2017 | Game Maya | Prim | One 31 | Supporting role | |
| 2017 | Rak Rai | Duangduen | Channel 3 | Guest role | |
| 2017 | Ways To Protect Relationship | Sai's mother | GMM 25 | Main role | |
| 2017 | Duen Pradab Dao | Ruenjit | Channel 3 | Supporting role | |
| 2018 | Matuphoom Haeng Huachai | Anima Ruangritthikun | Channel 3 | Supporting role | |
| 2018 | Sampat Ruttikan | Khun Ying Thipthida | GMM 25 | Supporting role | |
| 2018 | Love by Chance | Putch (Pete's mom) | GMM 25, LINE TV | Supporting role | |
| 2018 | The Judgement | Buppha (Lookkaew's stepmother) | GMM 25, Netflix | Supporting role | |
| 2018 | In Family We Trust | Nipha Jiraanan | One 31 | Main role | |
| 2018 | Love at First Hate | Mae Napa | GMMTV | Supporting role | |
| 2018 | Duay Rang Atitharn | Waree | Channel 3 | Supporting role | |
| 2018 | Social Syndrome | Sa | LINE TV | Main role | |
| 2018 | Sin Lai Hong | Pathumrat | Channel 8 | Supporting role | |
| 2019 | Mia Noi | Kanin | GMM 25 | Supporting role | |
| 2019 | Wai Sab Saraek Kad 2 | Kingkaew Chamnankit / "Kaew" | Channel 3 | Supporting role | |
| 2019 | Nang Marn | Khun Ying Srisawat | GMM 25 | Supporting role | |
| 2019 | Love Beyond Frontier | Pa (Pat's mother) | GMM 25 | Supporting role | |
| 2019 | Bai Mai Tee Plid Plew | Niramon (Nira's mother) | One 31 | Supporting role | |
| 2019 | Dao Lhong Fah | | Channel 3 | Supporting role | |
| 2020 | Mother | Warintra | GMM 25, LINE TV, PPTV HD | Supporting role | |
| 2020 | Who Are You | Pacharee (Pete's mother) | GMMTV | Supporting role | |
| 2020 | Payakorn Sorn Ruk | Rujee (Theeruth's mother) | Channel 3 | Supporting role | |
| 2020 | Bad Genius | Headmistress Pornthip | One 31 | Supporting role | |
| 2021 | Barb Ayuttitham | Kharabaek's mother | Channel 3 | Supporting role | |
| 2021 | Tawan Tok Din | Kun | Amarin TV | Main role | |
| 2021 | Baker Boys | Roci | GMMTV | Supporting role | |
| 2022 | A Tale of Ylang Ylang | Saengchan | Channel 3 | Supporting role | |
| 2022 | The Miracle of Teddy Bear | Matana Burarat (Na) | Channel 3 | Supporting role | |
| 2022 | Devil Sister | Prapha Chaiwat | GMM 25 | Supporting role | |
| 2022 | Sai Roong | Parisa Worasetmetee (Pa) | One 31 | Supporting role | |
| 2023 | You Touched My Heart | Areewan | Channel 3 | Supporting role | |
| 2023 | The Infinite Love | Kanjana Kornprasitsap | PPTV HD | Guest role | |
| 2023 | Absolute Zero | Ongsa's mother | iQIYI | Supporting role | |
| 2023 | Tricky in Love | Ben | Channel 3 | Supporting role | |
| 2024 | The Secret of Us | Russamee Thananusak | Channel 3 | Supporting role | |
| 2024 | Affair | Wi | One 31 | Supporting role | |
| 2025 | My Golden Blood | Thara Amarittrakul | GMM 25 | Supporting role | |
| 2025 | The Twin Gambit | Tul's mother | One 31 | Guest role | |
| 2025 | I Love 'A Lot Of' You | Sairung's mother | GMM 25, Netflix | Guest role | |
| 2026 | Money, My Love | Mukmani | Channel 3 | Supporting role | |
| 2026 | Moonshadow | Janya | GMM 25 | Supporting role | |
| 2026 | Scarlet Heart Ullavee | Royal Consort Sukhantha | One 31 | Supporting role | |

=== Music video appearances ===
| Year | Title | Artist | Ref. |
|---|---|---|---|
| ??? | ผู้หญิงคนนี้ | Thitima Suttasunthorn | |
| ??? | หนี ทู | Two (Thai duo) (ต่อ-ต๋อง) | |
| 1994 | เสนอหน้า | Anant Boonnark | |
| 2015 | The Wedding Singer | THE BOYKOR feat พิชัย จิราธิวัฒน์ | |
| 2020 | ไม่ไหวอย่าฝืน | Palaphol Pholkongseng | |
| 2020 | รักครั้งสุดท้าย | Lomosonic | |

== Awards and nominations ==
| Year | Award | Category | Nominated work | Result | Ref. |
|---|---|---|---|---|---|
| 2020 | 16th Kom Chad Luek Awards | Best Supporting Actress in Film | Happy Old Year | Won | |
| 2020 | 10th Thai Film Director Awards | Best Supporting Actress | Happy Old Year | Runner-up | |
| 2020 | 17th Starpics Thai Film Awards | Best Supporting Actress | Happy Old Year | Nominated | |
| 2021 | 29th Suphannahong National Film Awards | Best Supporting Actress | Happy Old Year | Nominated | |
| 2026 | 15th Thai Film Director Awards | Best Supporting Actress | A Useful Ghost | Won | |
| 2026 | 22nd Kom Chad Luek Awards | Best Supporting Actress in Film | A Useful Ghost | Won | |
| 2026 | 34th Bangkok Critics Assembly Awards | Best Supporting Actress | A Useful Ghost | Won | |
| 2026 | 34th Suphannahong National Film Awards | Best Supporting Actress | A Useful Ghost | Won | |
