= Florence Faivre =

Thai actress

- ฟลอเรนซ์ วนิดา เฟเวอร์
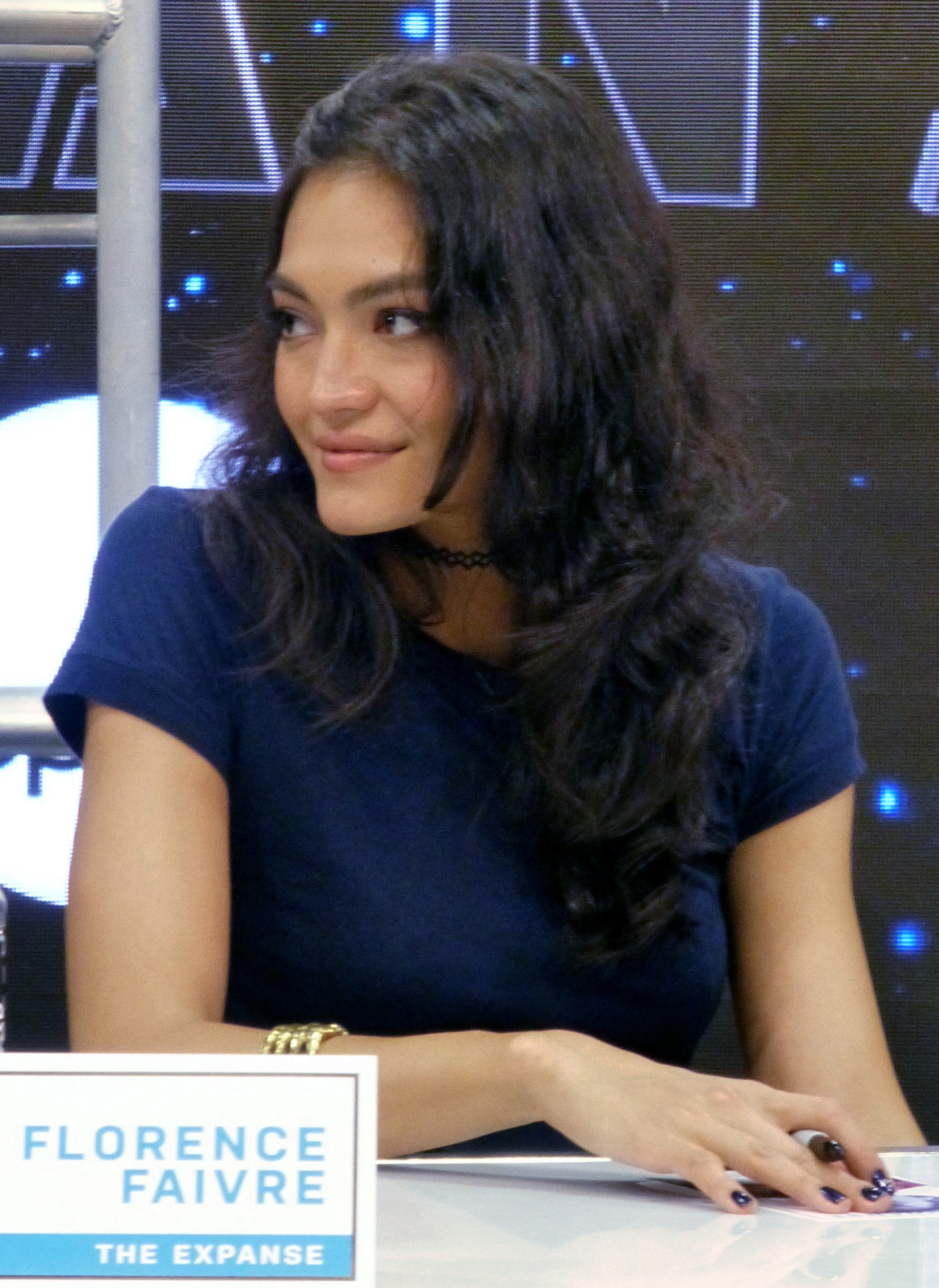
- Faivre at 2015 Fan Expo Canada
- Born: Florence Vanida Faivre; 8 June 1983 (age 42); Bangkok, Thailand
- Occupations: Actress; model; TV host
- Years active: 2004–present
- Notable work: The Expanse; The Siam Renaissance
- Height: 1.74 m (5 ft 8 1/2 in)

Florence Vanida Faivre (Thai: ฟลอเรนซ์ วนิดา เฟเวอร์; born 8 June 1983) is a French and Thai actress and model. She began her career as a teen television hostess in Thailand, and later branched into modelling and acting, making her film debut starring in the 2004 film The Siam Renaissance. She later moved to the United States, and has appeared in several films and television series.

== Life and career ==
Faivre was born in Bangkok to a French father and a Thai mother. She grew up in Aix-en-Provence in France, and moved to Thailand with her family when she was eight years old. At thirteen years of age, she started working as a television host for Teen Talk and E for Teen. A year later, she started modelling work.

After graduating from high school in Thailand, she was cast as Maneechan, the main character in The Siam Renaissance, a 2004 film adaptation of the novel Thawiphop. The film was at that time "the second largest Thai production ever". Faivre was nominated for the Suphannahong Award for best actress, but did not win.

Faivre subsequently moved to New York, where she initially concentrated on modelling. She has since appeared in several television series and films. John Anderson of Variety praised her performance in the otherwise poorly received The Elephant King, anticipating "a promising career, not just for her statuesque beauty but for her ability to navigate a role and character fraught with contradictions and moral shoals".

Faivre guest-starred in several TV series, including How to Make It in America and The Following, before landing a major role in The Expanse, a science fiction thriller. The show's first episode opened with a shot of Faivre floating weightlessly through a spaceship. Faivre's character Julie Mao, "a smart and rebellious woman from a wealthy family who chooses a principled life of hardship and becomes involved in politically subversive activities," was a regular in seasons 1 and 2, returning for a guest appearance in season 3.

In the fifth season of Agents of S.H.I.E.L.D. (2017–2018), Faivre had a recurring role as "the kick-ass Kree warrior Sinara taking down folks with a duo of metal balls".

The 2018 film American Mirror features Faivre as well as Susan Sarandon in major roles as muses to the protagonist.

== Filmography ==
=== Film ===
Year	Title	Role	Notes
2004	The Siam Renaissance	Maneechan	Nominated for the Suphannahong Award for best actress
2005	Chok-Dee	Kim	
2006	The Elephant King	Lek	
2008	The Coffin	Zoe's friend	
2009	Giver Taker Heartbreaker	Charlotte	
2018	Sad Beauty	Yo	Nominated for the Suphannahong Award for best actress
2019	The Assent	Dr. Maya	

=== Television ===
Year	Title	Role	Notes
2009	Kings	Hot Secretary	2 Episodes
2010	How to Make It in America	Celine	Episode: "Crisp"
2014	The Following	Serena	Episode: "Freedom"
2014	Alpha House	Teata Takaria	Episode: "The Contest"
2015–2018	The Expanse	Julie Mao	9 episodes
2017	Time After Time	Unknown	Episode: "Pilot"
2017	Bull	Claudine Caffrey	Episode: "Bring it On"
2017–2018	Agents of S.H.I.E.L.D.	Sinara	8 episodes

=== Video games ===
Year	Title	Role	Notes
2023	The Expanse: A Telltale Series	Julie Mao	Voice
