= Spooks in Thailand =

- Film poster
- Thai: มันเปลี่ยวมาก
- Directed by: Teekayu Dhamanitayakul; Sakon Tiacharoen; Pairoj Pasanthong; Leo Kittikorn
- Written by: Sakon Tiacharoen; Teekayu Dhamanitayakul; Pairoj Prasanthong
- Story by: Kittikorn Liasirikun
- Produced by: LEOZAAA; Kittikorn Liasirikun
- Starring: Thana Chatborirak; Suthep Po-ngam; Prachayanan Suwanmanee; Suporn Sangkaphibal; Kriengsak Hrientong
- Cinematography: Nattawut Kittikhun; Kraisorn Buranasing; Khomson Srisawasdi
- Edited by: Nitipoj Kositngamdeewongse; Chatchawan Triwanakarn; Tanaphat Sirisopano
- Music by: Giant Wave; Pheeravat Kusonsilp
- Production company: M39 Pictures
- Distributed by: M39 Pictures
- Release date: 12 June 2014
- Running time: 108 minutes
- Country: Thailand
- Language: Thai

Spooks in Thailand (Thai: มันเปลี่ยวมาก or Mun plaiw mak literally: "What a lonely") is a 2014 Thai fantasy-comedy anthology film directed by Kittikorn Liasirikun, Teekayu Dhamanitayakul, Sakon Tiacharoen and Pairoj Pasanthong.

== Plot ==
Four short stories from four directors told under one main concept; "ghost is anything".

- (GPS มัน...จะพาไปไหน ??) "Ghost Positioning System": Po took Gong his grandfather, who had a stomachache, to the hospital with the GPS system installed in the car. It turned out to be haunted navigation and lead them to unexpected places.
- (จ่าเฉย มัน...สิงอยู่ที่ไหน): "Sgt Choey & the Zebra": A young biker is chased by a traffic cop figure riding a zebra, even though he was already in the hospital. But it still didn't stop.
- (ตุ๊กตา มัน...เกินตอนไหน) "Buy Two Get One Free": A young married couple travel to China to pray for a child from the god. He also bought the lucky doll back in hopes that it would inspire him to have children. Anomalies occur when they multiply spontaneously.
- (มันจูนเจอตอนไหน... ?) "Mun Plaiw Mak": The last story is a about a man who has just been released from prison, only to find all of the sequel ghosts coming at him.

== Cast ==
- Segment "Ghost Positioning System"
  - Thana Chatborirak as Po
  - Suthep Po-ngam as Gong (grandpa)
  - Prachayanan Suwanmanee as GPS (voice)
- Segment "Sgt Choey & the Zebra"
  - Suporn Sangkaphibal as Ms Thank You
  - Thana Chatborirak as Jack
  - Kriengsak Hrientong as Sgt Choey (voice)
- Segment "Buy Two Get One Free"
  - Thana Chatborirak as Tue
  - Chollatorn Pratyarungroj as Jom
  - Sineenat Bodhivesa as Ma (grandma)
- Segment "Mun Plaiw Mak"
  - Thana Chatborirak as Pae
  - Pongpant Phetbuntoon as Pup
  - Yasuhiko Miyauchi as Yasu
  - Sakarin Suthamsamai as Internee
- Special Segment (Overture) "Bua Loi"
  - Pornpong Piboonthanakiat as Ed
  - Naiyana Thipsri as Bua Loi Ghost Trader (voice)

== Production & reception ==
Spooks in Thailand (or Mun plaiw mak in Thai title) is a cult film conceived by filmmaker Kittikorn Liasirikun. It is divided into four segments. All star the same actor, Thana Chatborirak (a younger brother of famed Pakorn Chatborirak), playing different roles.

The film was criticized for mocking the political situation at the time.
