= Khu Kam =

Thai novel written by Thommayanti

Khu Kam (คู่กรรม)
- Author: Thommayanti
- Language: Thai
- Publication date: 1969
- Publication place: Thailand

Koo Kam (Thai: คู่กรรม) is a Thai novel written by Thommayanti. It has had several screen adaptations, including a 1995 film Sunset at Chaopraya and a 2013 remake that shared the same name.

== Plot summary ==
Set in 1939, during the early days of World War II in Thailand, the novel opens with Angsumalin meeting her childhood friend, a young Thai man named Vanus, for the last time. He is departing for England to pursue his studies and hopes that Angsumalin will wait for him and marry him upon his return.

Shortly thereafter, Thailand is invaded by Japanese military forces. In Thonburi, opposite Bangkok on the Chaophraya River, the Imperial Japanese Navy establishes itself at a base. The forces there are led by Kobori, an idealistic young navy lieutenant. One day he sees Angsumalin swimming in the river and falls for her. She, being a proudly nationalistic Thai woman, despises him because he is a foreigner.

Nonetheless, Kobori persists in seeing her and a courtship develops. Angsumalin finds that Kobori is a truly nice gentleman and start falling for him but she keeps her feelings secret because of the war.

Then, for political reasons, Angsumalin's father – who is a leader in the Free Thai Movement, insists that she marry Kobori. Understanding that Angsumalin is not marrying him out of love, Kobori promises not to touch her, but he breaks that vow after the wedding.

Despite this, Angsumalin develops tender feelings for Kobori, but is still torn by her feelings for her nation and feels guilty towards Vanus, who returns to set in motion a conflict between the two men.

== Inspiration ==
Thommayanti was inspired by visiting the Kanchanaburi War Cemetery around 1965, when she saw a touching inscription on a gravestone. When inquired, it was found that he was a Dutch soldier who was the only son of the family whom died in Thailand without the parents being able to attend their son's funeral. So she reflected on how much pain the mother's heart would feel.

== Film, TV or theatrical adaptations ==
- Koo Gum (1970) – Starring Mechai Viravaidya as Kobori
- Koo Gum (1973) – Starring Nard Poowanai as Kobori
- Koo Gum (1978) – Starring Nirut Sirichanya as Kobori and Sansanee Samanworawong as Angsumalin – TV series on Channel 9
- Koo Gum (1988) – Starring Waruth Woratum as Kobori and Chintara Sukapatana as Angsumalin (Hideko) – is the author's favourite version of Koo Gum, the review mentioned this is the best version of Koo Gum that have ever been made
- Koo Gum (1990) – 26 episode TV series on Channel 7 starring Kwang Komoltithi as Angsumalin and Thongchai McIntyre as Kobori, regarded as the most successful TV series in the Thai entertainment industry history, because it received a high rating of 40, which is the highest record to date.
- Sunset at Chaopraya (1995) – Starring Thongchai McIntyre as Kobori and Apasiri Nitibhon as Angsumalin
- Koo Gum - The Musical (2003) – Starring Ozeki Seigi as Kobori and Teeranai Na Nongkai as Angsumalin. Seigi was the only Japanese actor who played Kobori.
- Koo Gum (2004) – 12 episode TV series on Channel 3 starring Benz Pornchita as Angsumalin and Num Sornram as Kobori
- Koo Gum 2 (2004) – A sequel showing the journey of Kobori and Angsumalin's son
- Sunset at Chaophraya (2013) – 24 episode TV series on Channel 5 Starring Sukrit Wisetkaew (Bie the Star) as Kobori and Noona Nuengtida as Angsumalin
- Sunset at Chaopraya (2013) – Starring Nadech Kugimiya as Kobori and Oranate D.Caballes as Angsumalin
