= Monthon Arayangkoon =

Thai film director, screenwriter and producer

- มณฑล อารยางกูร
- Education: Chulalongkorn University
- Occupations: Film director; producer; screenwriter

Monthon Arayangkoon (Thai: มณฑล อารยางกูร) is a Thai film director, screenwriter and producer. His credits include Garuda, the first all-digital Thai film production. His other films include The Victim and The House. He attended Chulalongkorn University, graduating from the Faculty of Education, Department of Art Education.

== Filmography ==
- Garuda (2004)
- The Victim (2006)
