= The Siam Renaissance =

2004 Thai historical fantasy film

- Film poster
- Directed by: Surapong Pinijkhar
- Screenplay by: Poraminthra Krouethong; Surapong Pinijkhar
- Based on: Thawiphop by Thommayanti
- Produced by: Arporn Pinijkhar
- Starring: Florence Faivre
- Cinematography: Choochart Nantitanyatada
- Edited by: Surapong Pinijkhar
- Production company: Film Bangkok
- Distributed by: A.G. Entertainment
- Release date: 27 February 2004
- Running time: 141 minutes
- Country: Thailand
- Language: Thai

The Siam Renaissance, known in Thai as Tawipop or Thawiphop (Thai: ทวิภพ), is a 2004 Thai historical fantasy film directed by Surapong Pinijkhar. It is the second film adaptation of the 1986 novel Thawiphop by Thommayanti. It stars Florence Vanida Faivre in her film acting debut as Maneechan, a contemporary young woman who is transported to Siam of the 19th century and witnesses the country's struggles against the colonial aspirations of Britain and France.

The film, produced by Film Bangkok, employed among the largest budgets for Thai films at the time, but was not financially successful. However, it has gained recognition as a major milestone in Thai cinema's developing trend of historical films and for its contribution to the discourse on Thai identity. It was included in the Thai Film Archive's inaugural list of national heritage films in 2011.
