= Garuda (2004 film) =

- Thai poster
- Directed by: Monthon Arayangkoon
- Written by: Monthon Arayangkoon
- Produced by: Monthon Arayangkoon; Pawinee Wichayapongkul
- Starring: Sornram Teppitak; Sara Legge; Dan Fraser; Chalad Na Songkhla; Yani Tramod; Phairote Sangwaribut
- Cinematography: Jiradech Samniangsanor
- Edited by: Monthon Arayangkoon
- Distributed by: R.S. Film; Tokyo Shock (U.S. DVD Release)
- Release date: 1 April 2004
- Running time: 115 minutes
- Country: Thailand
- Languages: Thai; English

Garuda (Thai: ปักษาวายุ, romanized: Paksa wayu) is a 2004 Thai kaiju film directed by Monthon Arayangkoon.

== Plot ==
The discovery of a mysterious fossil sets the stage for a terrifying confrontation between modern day man and Thai folklore. A tunnel excavation has revealed a rock so dense that it cannot be penetrated by even the strongest drill. When the workers discover a collection of unrecognizable fossils that bear no similarities to the familiar dinosaur types, they enlist the aid of archeologist Lenna Pierre and her American partner Tim in revealing the origins of the mysterious geological find. Awakened by the large scale excavation and enraged at having been trapped beneath the Bangkok concrete for hundreds of years, the ancient Garuda sets out on a bloody rampage as Leena, Tim, and the military struggle to find a means of bringing Garuda's destructive reign of terror to an end.

== Production ==
Garuda is the first Thai film to be shot on a digital camera.

== Release ==
Garuda was released in North America on Video on Demand in 2007, then later on DVD by Tokyo Shock.

== Reception ==
Critical reception for the film is mostly negative.

Dread Central awarded the film a score of 2 / 4, criticizing the film's acting, and special effects.

Joseph Savitski from Beyond Hollywood.com gave the film a negative review, stating, "Garuda had potential to be a great monster movie. Most of the film’s faults can be attributed to oftentimes sloppy direction and editing by the writer/director, whose own script barely makes any sense. This is too bad, because “Garuda” has decent special effects, as well as an appealing female lead in Sara Legge. Unfortunately, like most monster movies, “Garuda” ends up treading formula instead of creating new ones, resulting in a film that doesn't stand out from the crowd".

Adam Arseneau from DVD Verdict gave the film a negative review, criticizing the film's poor plot, bad acting, poorly executed special effects, and overuse of action film clichés.
