= The Victim (2006 film) =

- The Thai theatrical release poster.
- Directed by: Monthon Arayangkoon
- Written by: Sompope Vejchapipat; Monthon Arayangkoon
- Produced by: Jantima Liawsirikun; Monthon Arayangkoon; Nitat Kumdee
- Starring: Phitchanat Sakhakon; Apasiri Nitibhon; Penpak Sirikul
- Cinematography: Paiboon Pupradub
- Edited by: Monthon Arayangkoon
- Music by: Patai Poungchneen
- Distributed by: RS Film; United International Pictures; Tartan Films; Golden Network Asia
- Release date: 12 October 2006 (Thailand)
- Running time: 108 minutes
- Country: Thailand
- Language: Thai

The Victim (Thai: ผีคนเป็น) is a 2006 Thai horror-thriller film co-written and directed by Monthon Arayangkoon. The film stars Phitchanat Sakhakon as a struggling young actress who takes a job working for the police department, re-enacting crime scenes, but starts to have frightening experiences when she takes on the role of a murdered beauty queen.

== Plot ==
Ting is a struggling young actress who one day is noticed by Royal Thai Police Lieutenant Te, who heads up the crimes re-enactment unit and is always on the look-out for fresh talent. Ting is put to work playing the victim in photo shoots with the hand-cuffed accused killers and rapists at crime scenes. The photos are published in Thai newspapers as a means of the police publicizing that they have closed the case and done their jobs.

Ting takes a liking to her job, and is so convincing that even the criminals are moved to remorseful tears. Her popularity soaring, Ting is signed to play the lead in a film based on one of her true-crime re-enactments - the murder of Meen, a former Miss Thailand whose husband, Dr. Charun, is accused of the crime. Ting then starts experiencing some scary visions that lead her believe that Meen's longtime friend, Fai, is responsible.

Then it is revealed that the events were actually entirely a film about Meen's murder, and Ting is merely a character being played by another actress named May. But while on the set filming the movie, in real life May was really possessed by a spirit that is very obsessed with her.

== Cast ==
- Phitchanat Sakhakon as Ting/May
- Apasiri Nitibhon as Mean/Aum
- Penpak Sirikul as Fai/Tai
- Kiradej Ketakinta as Tae
- Chokchai Charoensuk as Jaral
- Sompong Tawee as Bee
- Peraphong Malaithong as Bai
- Rashane Limtrakul as Shane
- Benchaporn Punyaying as Kag
- Sompope Vejchapipat as Joke
- Prapon Sirisomboon as Au
- Natthakan Thayutajaruwit as Ghost 1
- Karnpich-Cha Pongkullapat as Acting Coach
- Tipwalee Sakunathawong as Fortune Teller

== Production ==
=== Origins ===
The concept of the film is based on an actual technique that is used in crime investigations by the Royal Thai Police, in which the crimes are re-enacted by handcuffed convicted criminals for the Thai media. Such photos are regularly seen in the mass-circulation daily newspapers of Thailand.

"It all began when I watched the police investigating key criminal cases by using stand-ins to re-enact crime scenes," director Monthon Arayangkoon said in the film's production notes. "I wondered how those actors or actresses could handle such a horrifying task. Didn't they feel scared at all? For some scenes, like a rape scene, I can't help but wonder why they have to use a real woman to impersonate the victim. Didn't those who acted as the dead feel anything at all?"

=== Locations ===
Some of the filming locations were actual famous crime scenes. These include "The Haunted House at Nong Jork", an unfinished house where a construction worker was killed during a drunken brawl. Work then stopped on the house and it has been used since as a place where criminals dump dead bodies.

Another location is a deserted house in Bang Len, where in late 1990s the poorer suitor of a wealthy family's daughter was killed by the young woman's father, who opposed his daughter's relationship with the man. The dead man's family then hired a gunman to kill the father. The abandoned house was also the scene of a woman's hanging death.

A third location is an abandoned hospital building at Bang Len, where illegal abortions were once performed and a seven-months pregnant woman was raped and killed. The woman's ghost was later seen at her own funeral, and the hospital has been abandoned since.

At all the locations, film crews reported experiencing strange phenomena, such as noises, odd wind and faint images of faces on the film.

The use of the locations was significant in Thailand, where belief in ghosts is common.

== Release ==
The Victim was released in Thai cinemas on October 12, 2006, and was screened on October 17 at the 2006 Pusan International Film Festival. The film had its North American premiere at the 2007 Fantasia Festival in Montreal. It was then released on English-subtitled DVD by Tartan Asia Extreme on September 18, 2007.

== Reception ==
Variety critic Richard Kuipers, who reviewed the film at the 2006 Pusan International Film Festival called The Victim "an entertaining and suspenseful merger of ghost story and crime thriller", and praised the "neat back-flip" of a mid-film twist.

Jeff Allard, writing for the horror-genre website, Shock Till You Drop, was more muted in this response, saying the film "is a moderate time waster that sports its share of interesting moments but thanks to a convoluted script, it can't deliver the cumulative effect that a good ghost story needs."
