= Phitchanat Sakhakon =

Thai actress (born 1981)

- พิชญ์นาฎ สาขากร
- Born: 22 May 1981 (age 45); Bangkok, Thailand
- Education: Assumption University
- Occupation: Actress

Pitchanart Sakakorn (Thai: พิชญ์นาฎ สาขากร, RTGS: Phitchanat Sakhakon; born 22 May 1981), is a Thai actress. Her starring film roles include Pattaya Maniac, Buppah Rahtree Phase 2: Rahtree Returns and The Victim.

She has a bachelor's degree from Assumption University.

== Filmography ==
- Butterfly in Grey (2002)
- Pattaya Maniac (2004)
- Buppah Rahtree Phase 2: Rahtree Returns (2005)
- Ghost Variety (2005)
- Black Night (Segment, The Lost Memory, 2006)
- The Victim (2006)
- Saturday Killer (2011)

=== Television dramas ===
- 2002 Sapai Jao (สะใภ้จ้าว) (Broadcast Thai Television/Ch.3) as Ying Koy (หม่อมราชวงศ์หญิงเทพีเพ็ญแสง รัชนีกุล (คุณหญิงก้อย))
- 2002 (นางมาร) (Pau Jin Jong/Ch.7) as Ranee (ระณี)
- 2003 (ก็ว่าจะไม่รัก) (Broadcast Thai Television/Ch.3) as Amnid (อำนิษฐ์)
- 2004 (ขอพลิกฟ้าตามล่าเธอ) (/Ch.3) as Rinsay (รินทราย)
- 2005 (กลิ่นแก้วตำหนักขาว) (Quiz And Quest/Ch.3) as Pimpha (พิมพา)
- 2005 Wimarn Sai (2005) (วิมานทราย) (Exact-Scenario/Ch.5) as Lookmee (สิริรัศมี)
- 2005 Hoi Un Chun Ruk Tur (ฮอยอันฉันรักเธอ) (Red Drama/Ch.3) as Wikarnda (วิกานดา)
- 2005 (ปิ๊ง) (/Ch.3) as (ดีดี้)
- 2005 (ใต้ร่มเงารัก) (/Ch.3) as (มีนา)
- 2007 (ภูตพยาบาท) (/ITV) as (ณัฐฐา) with Atsadawut Luengsuntorn
- 2009 Mea Luang (เมียหลวง) (Dara VDO/Ch.7) as Waranaree (วรนารี)
- 2009 Buang Ruk Gammatep (บ่วงรักกามเทพ) (Exact-Scenario/Ch.5) as Nina (นีน่า)
- 2010 Reun Son Ruk (เรือนซ่อนรัก) (Dida Video Production/Ch.7) as Ornanong (อรอนงค์)
- 2010 (เธอกับเขาและรักของเรา) (Polyplus entertainment/Ch.7) as Sagee (ศจี)
- 2011 Nai Roy Ruk (ในรอยรัก) (Dara VDO/Ch.7) as Pinsuda (Kib) (พินสุดา (กิ๊บ))
- 2012 Prik Gub Klur (พริกกับเกลือ) (Masquerade/Ch.7) as Marasri (มารศรี)
- 2012 Qi Pao (กี่เพ้า) (Broadcast Thai Television/Ch.3) as Jao Lin Peuy (Pei Pei) (เจ้าหลินเพ่ย (เพ่ยเพ่ย))
- 2012 (เจ้าแม่จำเป็น) (Exact-Scenario/Ch.5) as (มิ้ว)
- 2015 Tawun Thud Burapah 2015 (ตะวันตัดบูรพา) (Exact-Scenario/One 31) as Chomchat (เจิมฉัตร) with Anatpol Sirichoomsang
- 2016 (หมอผี) (SRIKHUMRUNG PRODUCTION/PPTVHD36) as (รัตติกาล)
- 2018 Rak Chan Sawan Jat Hai (รักฉันสวรรค์จัดให้) (/Ch.8) as Netchanok (เนตรชนก (รับเชิญ))
- 2018 Mia 2018 (เมีย 2018 รักเลือกได้) (The One Enterprise/One 31) as (มุนินทร์ (นิน)) with Puntakarn Thongjure
- 2019 Taley Rissaya (2018) (ทะเลริษยา) (The One Enterprise/One 31) as Tikana (ตรีคณา)
- 2019 Rerk Sanghan (ฤกษ์สังหาร) (The One Enterprise/One 31) as Chingduang (พ.ต.ต. พ.ญ.ชิงดวง พงศ์กรณ์กุล) with Pobtorn Sunthornyarnkit
- 2022 Wiwa Fah Laep (วิวาห์ฟ้าแลบ) (The One Enterprise-Por Dee Kam/One 31) as Nat (นภัสสร วงศ์ฤกษ์ไพศาล (แนท)) with Akarat Nimitchai
- 2023 (จำแลงรัก) (The One Enterprise/One 31) as ()

=== Television series ===
- 2016 Club Friday The Series 8 (คลับฟรายเดย์ เดอะซีรีส์ 8 ตอน รักแท้หรือแค่เอาชนะ) (A Time Media/GMM 25) as (ดา)
- 2018 Club Friday The Series 10 (คลับฟรายเดย์ เดอะซีรีส์ 10 รักนอกใจ ตอน เหตุเกิดจากความรู้สึกผิด) (CHANGE2561/GMM 25) as (แพท) with Pathompong Reonchaidee

=== Television sitcom ===
- 2010 (เนื้อคู่อยากรู้ว่าใคร ตอนที่ 13) (GMM Tai Hub/Ch.5) as (สายลับ 001(ฟ้า) (รับเชิญ))
- 2020 3 Num 3 Mum x2 (3 หนุ่ม 3 มุม x2) (The One Enterprise/One 31) as Prae (ณาลัลน์ ตรีพูนสุข (แพร) (รับเชิญ))

=== MC ===
Television

- 2010 (คนอวดผี (รับเชิญ)) (/Ch.7) (2010)
- 2015 E- Entertainment () (/Ch.8) (2015)

Online

- 20 () (YouTube:)
