= Suppachai Srivijit =

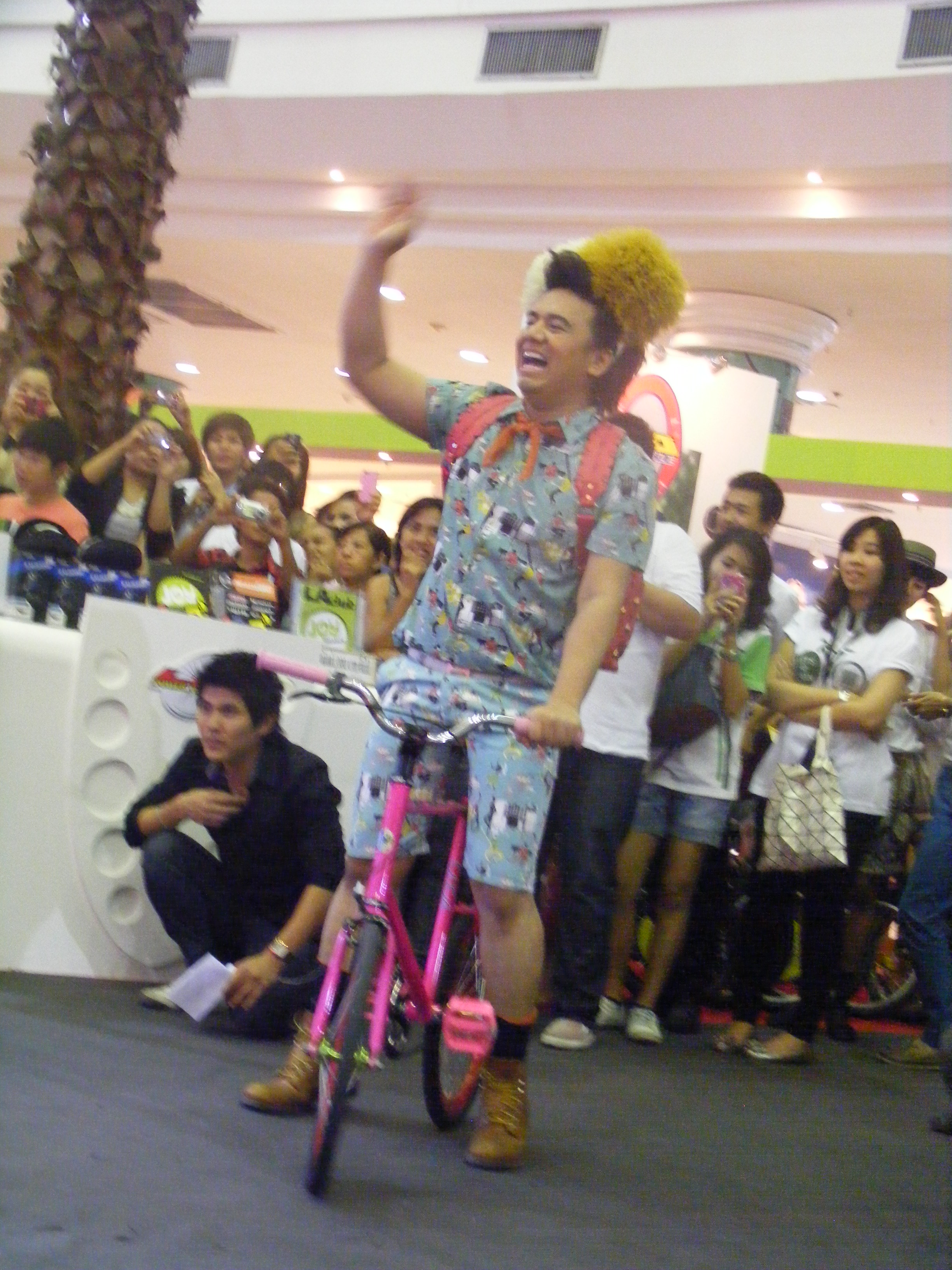
- Born: December 25, 1973 (age 51); Phrom Khiri District Nakhon Si Thammarat Province
- Occupations: actor manager; drama director; actor; drama producer; YouTuber; businessman

Suppachai Srivijit (Thai: ศุภชัย ศรีวิจิตร; born 25 December 1973) is a Thai actor manager, drama director, actor, businessman, YouTuber and drama producer.

== Biography ==
Suppachai grew up in a rural society in Phrom Khiri district, Nakhon Si Thammarat Province. His house is a rubber plantation his father was a teacher. Suppachai is of Chinese descent from his mother.

Supachai completed his secondary school education at Benjamarachutit School Nakhon Si Thammarat and completed tertiary education from the Faculty of Engineering Rangsit University

He started entering the entertainment industry, when he came to study at the higher education level in Pathum Thani Province, in the Faculty of Engineering, Rangsit University, Supachai came to live with aunt of Yui-Pattamawan Khaomunkhadee, a famous singer and actress, who is a distant relative, he became a supporting actor in commercials and dramas. Supachai appeared in the 1994 drama Sairak Saisawat that aired on Channel 3.

Suppachai is the manager of Patcharapa Chaichua, Nattawut Skidjai, Kantapong Bamrungrak, Nadech Kugimiya, Mario Maurer, Sukollawat Kanaros, etc. He started his actor manager career as a personal manager for Aum-Patcharapa Chaichua, a Thai superstar heroine, who was a close friend since college. Before becoming a manager for many famous actors in Thailand, both men and women, causing later, he had to send a close subordinate to be the manager of the stars under his agency instead.
