= Henry's First Dates =

- Theatrical release poster
- Directed by: Mez Tharatorn
- Screenplay by: Mez Tharatorn; Tosapol Thipthinnakorn; Benjamaporn Srabua
- Based on: 50 First Dates by George Wing
- Produced by: Mez Tharatorn; Jira Maligool; Vanridee Pongsittisak; Suwimol Techasupinan
- Starring: Nadech Kugimiya; Nicha Yontararak
- Production companies: GDH; Sony Pictures International Productions
- Release date: September 17, 2026
- Running time: 115 minutes
- Country: Thailand
- Language: Thai

Henry's First Dates (Thai: จีบซ้ำซ้ำ เฮนรี่จำไม่ได้) is a 2026 Thai romantic comedy adapted from the 2004 American film 50 First Dates. It is co-produced by GDH and Sony Pictures International Productions. Directed and produced by Mez Tharatorn, the film stars Nadech Kugimiya and Nicha Yontararak. The film released on September 17, 2026.

== Cast ==
- Nadech Kugimiya as Henry
- Nicha Yontararak as Lucy
- Kiat Kitcharoen
- Ble Patumrach
- Thipakorn Chaiyaprasit

== Production ==
=== Development ===
The project began as a collaboration between GDH and Sony Pictures International Productions, with an official announcement on August 8, 2025. It aims to remake the 2004 film 50 First Dates within a Thai cultural context. The adaptation modernizes the story with a fresh twist. Unlike the original film, where the male lead courts a woman with amnesia, this version reverses the roles, featuring a female lead who pursues a man living with the condition.

The film is produced by Vanridee Pongsittisak, Jira Maligool, Mez Tharatorn, and Suvimol Techasupinan. In addition to directing and producing, Mez Tharatorn also co-wrote the screenplay with Tosapol Thipthinnakorn and Benjamaporn Srabua.

=== Casting ===
Henry's First Dates stars Nadech Kugimiya alongside Nicha 'Minnie' Yontararak, marking her feature film debut.

=== Filming ===
On September 25, 2025, GDH held an blessing ceremony to commence filming. The supporting cast was also revealed, featuring Kiat Kitcharoen, Arthit Somnoi, and Thipakorn Chaiprasit. Filming wrapped on December 11, 2025, followed by a wrap party on the same day.

=== Marketing and promotion ===
On July 23, 2026, the first teaser was released, confirming the theatrical release date for September 17, 2026.
