= Ahimsa: Stop to Run =

- The Thai movie poster.
- Directed by: Kittikorn Liasirikun
- Written by: Kittikorn Liasirikun
- Produced by: Kittikorn Liasirikun; Jantima Liawsirikun; Rashane Limtrakul
- Starring: Boriwat Yuto; Theeradanai Suwannahom; Johnny Unwa
- Edited by: Kittikorn Liasirikun; Chatchai Nakornwong
- Music by: Zan Sab
- Distributed by: RS Film
- Release date: 20 October 2005
- Running time: 90 minutes
- Country: Thailand
- Language: Thai

Ahimsa: Stop to Run (Thai: อหิงสา จิ๊กโก๋ มีกรรม, romanized: Ahingsa-Jikko mee gam) is a 2005 Thai comedy-drama film written and directed by Kittikorn Liasirikun (also known as Leo Kittikorn).

== Plot ==
Ahingsa is a young man who is haunted by his karma, which takes the form of a mysterious red-haired man who dishes out abuse when Ahingsa runs afoul of morality. When Ahingsa was a young boy, a shaman had the mysterious man removed, but the man returns when Ahingsa is a young man and starts taking drugs and getting involved in rave culture. Ahingsa's behavior soon causes trouble for his friends, Ukhoht and Einstein, and a female physician, Dr. Pattaya.

== Cast ==
- Boriwat Yuto as Ahingsa
- Theeradanai Suwannahom as Mysterious Man/Karma
- Prinya Ngamwongwarn as Ukhoht
- Ampon Rattanawong as Man with birdcages
- Taranya Sattabusya as Dr. Pattaya
- Johnny Unwa as Einstein

== Accolades ==
The film was Thailand's official entry to the 79th Academy Awards. It was chosen after Invisible Waves had been withdrawn by the Federation of National Film Associations of Thailand.
