= Sunset at Chaophraya (1995 film) =

- VHS cover art
- Directed by: Euthana Mukdasanit
- Written by: Wanich Jarunggidanan (screenplay); Thommayanti (novel)
- Produced by: Euthana Mukdasanit
- Starring: Bird McIntyre; Apasiri Nitibhon
- Cinematography: Pipat Pyakha
- Edited by: Warapa Kasemsri
- Music by: Anuwat Surbsuwan
- Distributed by: Grammy Film
- Release date: 1995
- Running time: 135 minutes
- Country: Thailand
- Languages: Thai; Japanese

Sunset at Chaophraya (Thai: คู่กรรม, Khu Kam) is a 1995 romantic-drama film directed by Euthana Mukdasanit. Adapted from the novel Khu Kam by Thommayanti, the story is a love triangle, set in World War II-era Thailand, and depicts the star-crossed romance between an Imperial Japanese Navy officer and a Thai woman who is involved with the Free Thai resistance.

Singer Thongchai "Bird" McIntyre stars as the Japanese officer Kobori, reprising his role from a popular, 26-episode television series in 1990 that was based on the book. Aside from the 1990 series, the story has been adapted numerous times, including a film in 1973, another film in 1988 and a musical play in 2003 by Dreambox Theatre in Bangkok that was revived in 2007.

One of top five box office hits in Thailand in 1995, this film was among the first Thai films to gain overseas distribution for home video, with an English-subtitled VHS release in 1998.

== Plot ==
It is 1944, and the Japan's efforts to win the Pacific War are failing, and a Thai woman, Angsumalin, has just lost her husband, Kobori, an officer in the Imperial Japanese Navy.

The scene then flashes back to 1939, the early days of World War II in Siam, to Angsumalin meeting one last time with her former lover, a young Thai man named Vanus. He is leaving for England for his studies and hopes that Angsumalin will wait for him and marry him when he returns.

Shortly thereafter, Thailand is invaded by Japanese military forces. In Thonburi, opposite Bangkok on the Chaophraya River, the Imperial Japanese Navy establishes itself at a base. The forces there are led by Kobori, an idealistic young captain. One day he sees Angsumalin swimming in the river and falls for her. She, being a proudly nationalistic Thai woman, despises him because he is a foreigner.

Nonetheless, Kobori persists at seeing her and a courtship develops. Angsumalin sees a way to use Kobori to serve the underground Free Thai Movement while she waits for Vanus.

Then, for political reasons, Angsumalin's father insists that she marry Kobori. Understanding that Angsumalin is not marrying him out of love, Kobori promises not to touch her, but he breaks that vow after the wedding.

Despite this, Angsumalin develops tender feelings for Kobori, but is still torn by her feelings for her nation and Vanus, who returns to set in motion a conflict between the two men.

== Cast (1995 Version) ==
The Thai VCD release.

- Bird McIntyre as Kobori
- Apasiri Nitibhon as Angsumalin (in Japanese name Hideko)
- Teerapat Sajakul as Vanus
- Supakorn Srisawat as Pol
- Deux Doksadao as Bua
- Chitrakorn Sundarapakshin as Angsumalin's father
