= Thommayanti =

Thai writer (1936–2021)

Khun Ying Wimon Siriphaibun วิมล ศิริไพบูลย์
- Born: 10 July 1936; Phra Nakhon, Siam
- Died: 13 September 2021 (aged 85); Chiang Mai, Thailand
- Occupation: Writer
- Writing career
- Language: Thai
- Notable awards: 2012 National Artist (Literature)

Thommayanti (Thai: ทมยันตี) was the pen name of Thailand National Artist Khun Ying Wimon Chiamcharoen (Thai: วิมล เจียมเจริญ; 10 July 1936 – 13 September 2021), née Wimon Siriphaibun (Thai: วิมล ศิริไพบูลย์, also Wimol Siripaiboon). She was a Thai novelist and was a legislator several times in her career.

== Bibliography ==
Among Thommayanti's works is the historical fantasy romance novel, Thawiphop (Thai: ทวิภพ), about a woman who time travels from the 20th century to Rama V-era Siam. The story was first adapted as a film by Cherd Songsri in 1990, and has since been adapted as a stage play, a musical, a television series, and a 2004 film (Siam Renaissance).

Another famous work is Khu Kam (Thai: คู่กรรม), a romance between a Thai woman and a Japanese soldier during World War II in Thailand. It has been adapted into four films, Sunset at Chaophraya (in 1973, 1988, 1996 and 2013), a stage musical, and a television series. Other works are the romantic love story Dang Duang Haruethai (ดั่งดวงหฤทัย) and the socially conscious tales Sapan Dao (สะพานดาว).

== Political controversies ==
Apart from her writing ability, she was a noted orator. On several occasions Wimon gave public speeches in favour of the military. During the coup d'état in the 6 October 1976 Massacre, Wimon played important role in the "housewife society", a group of wives of military generals. She also made public speeches against the students who agitated for democratic reform, saying that the students were destroying Thailand's good relationship with the United States. In that event, students were mass murdered and Wimon was appointed by the junta that took control of the country as a legislator and member of the National Reform Council. Later in 1979, Wimon was elected as a senator.

In 1986, the Supreme Court of Justice found Wimon, while serving as a senator, guilty of having committed adultery with Group Captain Akhom Atthawetworawut (นาวาอากาศเอก อาคม อรรถเวทย์วรวุฒิ), an officer who was also a senator, after Police Major Siwit Chiamcharoen (พันตำรวจตรี ศรีวิทย์ เจียมเจริญ), her husband, filed divorce proceedings and a claim for compensation. After the Supreme Court's judgment, the Senate resolved to dismiss Wimon from senatorial office.

In spite of the Supreme Court's conviction, King Bhumibol Adulyadej awarded Wimon the honorific titles Khun Ying in 2005.

== Awards ==
In 2012, the Ministry of Culture, through its Department of Cultural Promotion, honoured Khun Ying Wimon with the highest honour bestowed upon Thai artist by naming her "National Artist" (Literature) (Thai: ศิลปินแห่งชาติ).

== Death ==
She died on 13 September 2021 when she was 85 years old at her private house, Lanna Devalai in Chiang Mai Province.
