= Naowarat Yuktanan =

Thai actress

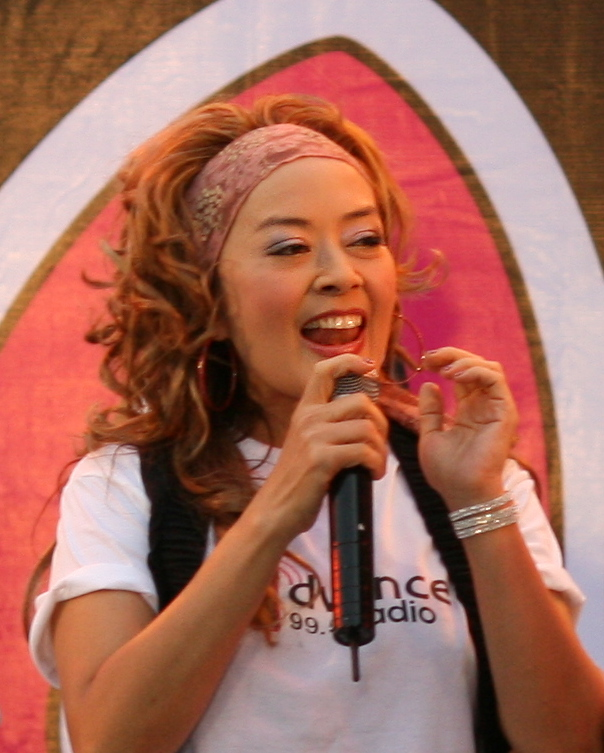
Naowarat Yuktanan

Naowarat Yuktanan (Thai: เนาวรัตน์ ยุกตะนันท์), b. February 7, 1958 (age 64) in Bangkok, Thailand. She is a Thai film actress. She was very popular in the late 1970s and early 1980s. She has a bachelor's degree and a master of public administration from Bangkok-Dhonburi University. She also won a Golden Doll Award in 1976 at the age of 18 for her performance in her first film, Phaendin Khong Raw (lit. Our Land). To date, she has acted in more than 300 films. As of January 2011 she has been in production for the historical film Phan Tai Norasingh.

Yuktanan attended the 52nd Academy Awards in 1980.

== Filmography ==
Partial filmography:

- Phaendin Khong Raw (1976)
- Poo Lom (1977)
- O, Madda (1977)
- Ruk Khat (1977)
- The Great Escape From Dien Bien Phu (Haek kai narok dien bien phu) (1977)
- 1 2 3 Monster Express (1 2 3 duan mahaphai) (1977)
- The Iron Buffalo (Ai Kwai Lek) (1977)
- Sao Jomken (1977)
- Ta Pi I-Pan (1977)
- Smile Hello (Yim sawasdi) (1978)
- Jamloei Rak (1978)
- Rak Kham Lok (1978)
- Fa Lang Fon (1978)
- 15 Yok Yok (1978)
- Phit Thang Rak (1978)
- Sing Sang Pa (1978)
- Rak Thi Prathana (1978)
- Butsaba Ka Kan (1978)
- Khu Rak (1978)
- Ai Nok (1978)
- Pho Khrua Hua Pa (1978)
- Jiggi Ko Mi Hua Jai (1979)
- Faen (1979)
- Phloen (1979)
- Chula Tri Khun (1980)
- Phit Rue Thi Ja Rak (1980)
- Phut Phitsawat (1980)
- Phu Ying (1980)
- La-ong Dao (1980)
- Keha Si Daeng (1980)
- Ai Ju (1980)
- Kratai Dong (1980)
- Raya (1981)
- Phuchit-Narisara (1981)
- That Dao Butsaya (1981)
- Soifa Khai Tua (1981)
- Kammanit Wasitti (1981)
- Kha Nam Nom (1981)
- Yot Rak Phu Kong (1981)
- Rak Phayabat (1981)
- Sut Than Rak (1981)
- Duang Ta Sawan (1981)
- Ngoen Pak Pi (1981)
- La Phayak (1983)
- Klet Kaew (1983)
- Khon Khwang Lok (1984)
- Sawatdi Khwamrak (1985)
- Chaos at the Graveyard (Khon baw phii baa paachaa taek) (2003)
- SARS Wars (Khun krabii hiiroh) (2004)
- Headless Hero 2 (Phii hua khaat 2)
- Happy Inn (Rohng tiam) (2005)
- The Mia a.k.a. The Bullet Wives (2005)
- Bus Lane (May narok muay yok law) (2007)
- Ghost-In-Law (Saphai breu... aw aw) (2008)
- Valentine (Cris-ka-ja baa sut sut) (2008)
- Dream Team (2008)
