= Saving Private Tootsie =

- Film poster
- Directed by: Kittikorn Liasirikun
- Written by: Kittikorn Liasirikun; Sommai Lertulan
- Produced by: Sangar Chatchairungruang; Adirek Watleela; Brian L. Marcar
- Starring: Sorapong Chatree; Akara Amarttayakul; Seri Wongmontha; Ornnapa Krissadee; Thongthong Mokjok; Kowit Wattanakul
- Cinematography: Decha Srimantra
- Edited by: Suthiporn Taptim
- Production company: Film Bangkok
- Release date: 29 November 2002 (Thailand)
- Running time: 96 minutes
- Country: Thailand
- Language: English

Saving Private Tootsie (Thai: พรางชมพู กะเทยประจัญบาน) is a 2002 Thai action comedy film. The film is directed by Kittikorn Liasirikun.

In the film, several katoeys (ladyboys) survive a plane crash in the jungle of an (unidentified) neighbouring country and several soldiers come to rescue them.

The film was sold for remake rights in the United States.

== Cast ==
- Sorapong Chatree as Sgt. Rerng
- Akara Amarttayakul (as Puthichai Amatayakul) as Capt. Sompong
- Seri Wongmontha as Kasem
- Ornnapa Krissadee as Som Ying
- Thongthong Mokjok as Chicha
- Kowit Wattanakul as PFC Pakorn
- Aed Carabao as Pang Long
- Theeradanai Suwannahom
- Boriwat Yuto
