= Kittikorn Liasirikun =

Thai film director, screenwriter and producer

- กิตติกร เลียวศิริกุล
- Born: 1967 (age 58–59)
- Occupations: Film director; screenwriter; producer

Kittikorn Liasirikun (Thai: กิตติกร เลียวศิริกุล; born 1967), also known as Leo Kittikorn, is a Thai film director, screenwriter and producer. His films include Bus Lane and Saving Private Tootsie.

== Filmography ==
=== Director ===
- 18-80 Buddy (18-80 Puan si maimee sua) (1997)
- A Miracle of Oam and Somwung (Patihan Om + Somwang) (1998)
- Goal Club (Game Lom To) (2001)
- Saving Private Tootsie (Phrang Chompu) (2002)
- The Mia aka The Bullet Wives (2005)
- Ahimsa: Stop to Run (Ahingsa-Jikko mee gam) (2005)
- Bus Lane (May narok muay yok law) (2007)
- Dream Team (2008)
- Sunset at Chaophraya (Khu Kam) (2013)
- Spooks in Thailand (Mun plaiw mak) (2014) (co-directed with other three directors)

=== Screenwriter ===
- Saving Private Tootsie (Phrang Chompu) (2002)
- Necromancer (Jom kha mung wej) (2005) (co-written with Piyapan Choopetch)
- Ahimsa: Stop to Run (Ahingsa-Jikko mee gam) (2005)
- Bus Lane (May narok muay yok law) (2007)
- Rakna 24 Hours (Rakna 24 Chuamohng) (2007) (co-written with Haeman Chatemee)
- Dream Team (2008)

=== Producer ===
- Ahimsa: Stop to Run (Ahingsa-Jikko mee gam) (2005)
- Som and Bank: Bangkok for Sale aka One Take Only (2001)
- Spooks in Thailand (Mun plaiw mak) (2014)
