= Pat Chatborirak =

Thai actor and model (born 1989)

- ภัทร์ ฉัตรบริรักษ์
- Born: Pat Chatborirak; May 1, 1989 (age 37); Bangkok, Thailand
- Other name: Pat (Nickname)
- Education: Chulalongkorn University (Faculty of Education)
- Occupation: Actor
- Years active: 2015–present
- Agent: Channel 3 (2015–2019)
- Height: 1.77 m (5 ft 9 1/2 in)
- Parents: Lephong Mahanikhajorn (father); Ngamthip Chatborirak (mother)
- Family: Pakorn Chatborirak (brother); Thana Chatborirak (brother); Wanmai Chatborirak (sister)

Pat Chatborirak (Thai: ภัทร์ ฉัตรบริรักษ์; born May 1, 1989), nickname Pat (Thai: ภัทร), is a Thai actor.

== Early life and education ==
Pat was born on Monday, 1 May 1989 in Bangkok, Thailand. He is the youngest among the three sons of Lephong Mahanikhajorn and Ngamthip Chatbirirak. Pat has 2 brothers, Pakorn Chatborirak, Thana Chatborirak, and also another adoptive sister, Wanmai Chatborirak.

Pat graduated from primary school from Assumption College (Thailand), lower secondary school from Bodindecha (Sing Singhaseni) School, upper secondary school from Triam Udom Suksa School and received a Bachelor's degree from the Faculty of Education, Chulalongkorn University (1st Class Honors). He has also served as the Faculty of Chulalongkorn University for the Chula–Thammasat Traditional Football Match event and has a Master's degree from the Faculty of Communication Arts, Chulalongkorn University.

== Career ==
Pat stepped into the industry by being a guest of Boy Pakorn, along with Nong Thana on the intricate program. After that, he had the opportunity to shoot many commercials and become a model for many magazines. Came to Channel 3 to see the glitter, so he called Pat to sign the contract as an actor under Thai color television Channel 3.

And in 2015, the first drama is Sai Lap Sam Mithii in the chapter wisawa in the role of inventor. Pat has a second drama. Paen Rai Long Tai Wa Rak in the chapter Tawan.

As for the work, create a name that is the most talked about, and the creation of the name that is the most talked about is Bunlang Dok Mai In the role of Karan It was his first episode that received overwhelming response.

== Filmography ==
=== Television series ===
Year	Title	Role	Network	Notes
2015	Sai Lap Sam Mithi	Wisawa	Channel 3	
2017	Bunlang Dok Mai	Karan	Channel 3	villain role
2017	Paen Rai Long Tai Wa Rak	Tawan / Phanumat Ritlueprakarn	Channel 3	Main Role
2017	Por Yung Lung Mai Wahng	Venice	Channel 3	
2017	Duen Pradab Dao	Non	Channel 3	
2019	Club Friday The Series Season 11: Ruk Nok Kot	Leng	GMM 25	
2019	VOICE	Dan	TRUE 24	
2020	Fah Fak Ruk	Tomr	Channel 3	
2020	Luang Ngao		PPTV	
2020	Sarm Sahai Kub Khun Nai Sa-ard	Dr.Thaecring	Channel 3	
