= Leh Lub Salub Rarng =

- Promotional poster
- Also known as: Secret Trick While Bodies Switch; Switch
- Genre: Romantic comedy; Drama; Action; Body swap
- Created by: No Problem Co. Ltd.
- Written by: Sorarat Jirabovornwisut
- Directed by: Krit Sukramongkol
- Starring: Nadech Kugimiya; Urassaya Sperbund; Thanapob Leeratanakajorn; Preechaya Pongthananikorn
- Country of origin: Thailand
- Original language: Thai
- No. of episodes: 10

Production
- Producer: Mam Thitima Sangkhapitak
- Production locations: Bangkok, Thailand

Original release
- Network: Channel 3
- Release: July 31 – September 4, 2017

Leh Lub Salub Rarng (Thai: เล่ห์ลับสลับร่าง, RTGS: Le Lap Salap Rang) is a 2017 Thai romantic comedy television series starring Nadech Kugimiya, Urassaya Sperbund, Preechaya Pongthananikorn and Thanapob Leeratanakajorn. It aired on Channel 3 from July 31 to September 4, 2017.

== Synopsis ==
Ramin, a high-profile police officer from a special unit, he is an egocentric playboy who looks down on women; and Petra, an arrogant and ungrateful superstar who looks down on men and her co-workers. Sinfulness bring these two together to learn integrity, honesty and respect by swapping bodies. They face danger, difficulties and obstacles to gradually improve, share, care and find true love on this incredible journey.

== Cast ==
=== Main cast ===
- Nadech Kugimiya as Ramin
- Urassaya Sperbund as Petra Pawadee
- Thanapob Leeratanakajorn as Akom
- Preechaya Pongthananikorn Nokyoong

=== Supporting cast ===
Actor/Actress	Character	Occupation	No. of episodes	Duration
Thanatchapan Booranachewaailai	Jae Aum	Petra's manager	10	2017
Premmanat "Peck" Suwannanon	Richard Adisorn	Drug Dealer	9	2017
Daraneenuch "Top" Pasutanavin	Tormanee	Petra's manager / Doctor	7	2017
Seneetunti "Maprang" Wiragarn	Ajala	Actress	–	2017
Seo Ji Yeon	Ji Eun	Nok's friend	–	2017
Sumonthip Leungutai	Sitala	Journalist	–	2017
Schiller "Krerk" Kirk	Seer	Fortune Teller	–	2017
Nithichai Yotamornsunthorn	Athit Aniruth	Actor	–	2017
Rachanee Siralert	Lady Puangkram	Richard's mother	4	2017
Sommart Praihirun	–	–	–	2017
Oak Keerati	–	–	–	2017
Thitinun Suwansuk	–	–	–	2017
Ruengrit Wisamol	–	–	–	2017
Dan Chupong	–	–	–	2017
San Eittisukkhanan	–	–	–	2017
Wichai Jongpasitkhun	–	–	–	2017
Bryon	–	Ramin and Petra's son	1	2017

- Premmanat Suwannanon as Ridtichad Adisorn (Old name) / Richard Adisorn (Rid) (New name)
- Ji Yeon Seo as Ji Ein (Nokyoong Friend)
- Krerk Chiller as Sak (Constellation fortune teller)
- Wichai Jongpasitkhun as Da-noo (Executive of IMAGE of LIFE Company)
- Daraneenuch Pohpiti as Tommanee (Tom) / Dr.Tibmanee
- Thanatchapan Booranachewaailai as Jae Aum (Petra's Manager)
- Thitinun Suwansuk as Phan Tamruat Ek Yudtapong Ead-in (Sa Ra Wad Yudtapong)
- Rachanee Siralert as Kun Nai Poungkram Adisorn (Ridtichad Mother)
- Kampoo Padtamasood as Kun Nai Jitta (Nokyoong Mother)
- Wiragarn Seneetunti as Assara Borisud (As) (TV series villain)
- Nithichai YotAmornSunthorn as Artid Ridtirong (tid) (TV series hero)
- Tor Ruengrit Wisamol as Song (Henchman Richard)
- Thodsapol Siriwiwat as Drama Director
- Oak Keerati as Director Kong

=== Cameo appearance ===
- San Eittisukkhanan as MC of Special Night Show (Ep.1)
- Sumonthip Leungutai as Seetala Wantib (Journalist) (Ep.1)
- Natchanon Puvanont as Roi Tamruat Tri Han (Ep.1,3,5,6,7,8,9,10)
- Chatwat Rattanawong as Roi Tamruat Tri Jack (Ep.1,3,5,6,7,8,9,10)
- as Roi Tamruat Tri Tong (Ep.1,3,5,6,7,8,9,10)
- as Roi Tamruat Tri Jo’ (Ep.1,3,5,6,7,8,9,10)
- Dan Chupong as Stunt performer (Ep.1)
- Jakkrid Kanokpodjananon as Stunt performer (Ep.1)

=== Performer ===
- Pongsit Phisitthakan as Journalist (Ep.1)
- Siwakorn Wirotdulay as Phon Tamruat Ek (Ep.1,8,9)
- Bencha Singkharawat as Guest at the GOLD LION MOVIE AWARDS (Ep.1)
- Nawaporn Supingklad as Special Night Show team (Ep.1)
- Pimpawan Chokbawornmethawat as Special Night Show team (Ep.1) / Nursing (Ep.4)
- Thidaporn Mojai as Meow (STAR HOLLY WOOD company employee) (Ep.1,2,3,6,7)
- Kittipol Ketmanee as The hostage when the culprit was captured and tied the giant firecrackers to him. (Ep.3)
- Wiwat Rattanapitak as Royal Thai Police (Ep.3)
- Somjat Thongpreche as Royal Thai Police (Ep.3)
- Chitrakorn Pinprachaporn as Guest in the fashion show Ying Nam Phet Nam Nueng (Ep.3,4)
- Siranee Yankittikarn as Guest in the fashion show Ying Nam Phet Nam Nueng (Ep.3,4)
- Charin Kornkanha as Guest in the fashion show Ying Nam Phet Nam Nueng (Ep.3,4)
- Ra-cha-ta Singchan as Guest in the fashion show Ying Nam Phet Nam Nueng (Ep.3,4)
- Wanthanee Chana-Chai-Yang-Young as Guest in the fashion show Ying Nam Phet Nam Nueng (Ep.3,4)
- Khomkri Wongvirot as Diamond robber at the fashion show of Lady Nam Phet Nam Nueng (Ep.3,4)
- Mongkol Wongthiphayawut as Doctor (Ep.4)
- Jakkawan Jamradsee as Royal Thai Police (Ep.4)
- Honey Saeng Saeng as Honey (Condo public relations staff) (Ep.4)
- Bank Tongtung as An ancient warrior who fought with Ramil in the past. (Ep.4)
- Nainan Tantulkanokrat as Da-Noo Secretary (Ep.5,7)
- Chat Luan-Kiao as The reporter interviewed Da-Noo (Ep.5,9,10)
- Thanyarak Somboon as Public Relations Officer, STAR HOLLY WOOD Company (Ep.6)
- Sirivej Charoenchon as Royal Thai Police (Ep.6)
- Waipod Krouysawad as Royal Thai Police (Ep.6)
- Panata Sukjit as Henchman Richard (Ep.7)
- Chonchana Saichanhom as Henchman Richard (Ep.7)
- Natakorn Ruengsee as Henchman Richard (Ep.8,9)
- Veerayut Paoliengthong as (Henchman Richard) (Ep.8)
- Jeerapad Sawangjang as Security company STAR HOLLY WOOD (Ep.8)
- Chinthan Thienkittipong as Wedding guests, Lt. Ramil and Peacock at the hotel (Ep.8)
- Sethanich Amornaya-Suthisiri as Wedding guests, Lt. Ramil and Peacock at the hotel (Ep.8)
- Virawut Kemkhang as Henchman Richard (Ep.9)
- Darunphop Suriyawong as Henchman Richard (Ep.9)
- Art Lamnarai as Henchman Richard (Ep.9)
- Pattanaset Chiratharn as Wedding guest, Pol. Lt. Arkom (Kom) and Mayura (Peacock) (Ep.10)
- Vita Deeplangploy as Wedding guest, Pol. Lt. Arkom (Kom) and Mayura (Peacock) (Ep.10)
- Kornpong Kitnitipramoun as Wedding guest, Pol. Lt. Arkom (Kom) and Mayura (Peacock) (Ep.10)
- Peeradet Ruengsamran as Journalist (Ep.10)

== Awards and nominations ==
Year	Award	Category	Nominee	Result
2017	SeeSan Buntherng Award	Couple of the Year	Nadech Kugimiya & Urassaya Sperbund	Won
2018	TV Gold Award	Best Actor in a Leading Role	Nadech Kugimiya	Won
2018	Daradaily The Great Award	Best Actor	Nadech Kugimiya	Won
2018	Nine Entertain Award	Actor of the Year	Nadech Kugimiya	Won
2018	Siam Dara Stars Award	Best Actor	Nadech Kugimiya	Won
2018	9th Annual Nattaraj Award	Best Actor	Nadech Kugimiya	Nominated
2018	Asian Television Award	Best Actor in a Leading Role	Nadech Kugimiya	Nominated
