= Bus Lane (film) =

- Thai theatrical poster.
- Directed by: Kittikorn Liasirikun
- Written by: Kittikorn Liasirikun
- Produced by: Kittikorn Liasirikun; Jantima Liawsirikun
- Starring: Udom Taephanit; Kiat Kitjaroen; Suthep Po-ngam; Naowarat Yuktanan; Siriphan Cheenchombun; Arisara Wongchalee
- Cinematography: Thamjaroen Promphan
- Edited by: Pannapan Songkham
- Distributed by: RS Film
- Release date: 12 April 2007
- Running time: 90 minutes
- Country: Thailand
- Language: Thai

Bus Lane (Thai: เมล์นรก หมวยยกล้อ or May narok muay yok law; lit: "The Hell Bus, Wheelie Chinese Girl") is a 2007 Thai action-comedy film directed by Kittikorn Liasirikun.

== Plot ==
The chaos ensues on Songkran day (13 April) when the disappointed security Sap wants to return home to see his little daughter After taking leave from BMTA security guard work and time of police job. He got on the bus line 39 (Rangsit–Sanam Luang) with Laa as a driver and Go as a bugging conductor. When he gets off the bus but Laa refuses to follow and takes issue with parking for other passengers. With pressure Sap decided to impulsively hijack, where the whole cab is filled with various types of passengers. And then on the way Laa received a penalty from Sap. The bus doesn't have a driver. Koh came to drive instead of Laa to park between the gas stations. In the end, the story ended well because everyone forgave Sap for warning the driver incorrectly. Sap chases all passengers and Laa off the bus while dropping guns along the way. Then Koh sends Sap to Sap's house.

== Cast ==
- Udom Taephanit as Go
- Kiat Kitjaroen as Sap
- Suthep Po-ngam as Laa
- Naowarat Yuktanan as Pawng
- Siriphan Cheenchombun as Tik
- Arisara Wongchalee as Plaa
- Khomsan Nanthajit as Dawn
- Prinya Ngamwongwarn
- Anchana Phetjinda as tom boy
- Pimchanok Ponlabhun as Muay
- Achita Sikamana as Suay
- Theeratorn Siriphunvaraporn as Chong
- Boriwat Yuto

== Filming location ==
The scene where the bus runs on a scenic rural road with a hilly terrain as well as a sign indicating the route to Nakhon Ratchasima was filmed at Treasure Hill Golf & Country Club in Ban Bueng, Chonburi.

== Release and reception ==
Bus Lane opened in Thailand cinemas on April 12, 2007. It was No. 1 at the box office on opening weekend, knocking the Thai canine comedy Ma-Mha from the top spot, and beating out the Jim Carrey thriller The Number 23, which opened the same week. It held the No. 1 spot for a second week, before dropping to No. 2 in its third week, No. 3 in its fourth week, and finally No. 10 and No. 16 in the subsequent two weeks.
