= Thitima Suttasunthorn =

Thai singer

- ฐิติมา สุตสุนทร
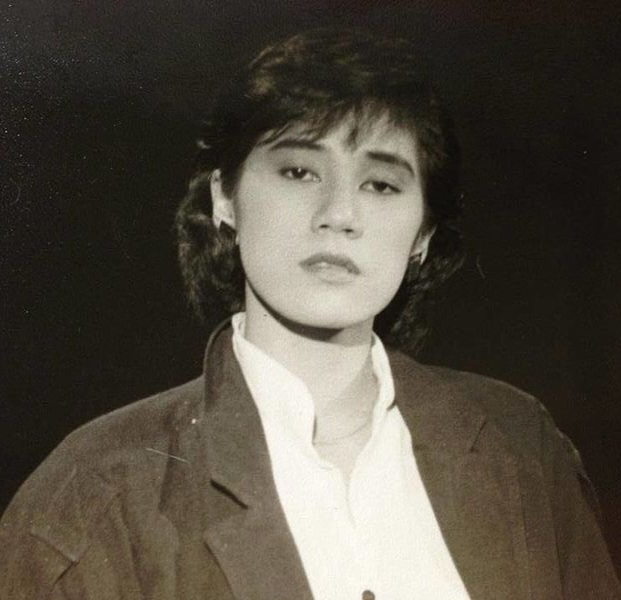
- Born: 4 September 1961; Prachuap Khiri Khan Province, Thailand
- Died: 7 July 2017 (aged 55)
- Occupation: Singer
- Musical career
- Genres: Pop; pop rock
- Years active: 1983–2017
- Label: GMM Grammy

Thitima Suttasunthorn (Thai: ฐิติมา สุตสุนทร), nicknamed Waen (แหวน), was a Thai singer.

== Early life and career ==
She was born on Monday 4 September 1961, in Prachuap Khiri Khan Province. She was a daughter of Sompop and Suphaporn Suttasuntorn. When she was 5 years old, her family moved to Bangkok. She finished her educated at the Faculty of Communication Arts, Chulalongkorn University.

She started her performing career in 1983 by singing for the movie soundtrack Wai Ralueang, and signed a contract with the record label GMM Grammy, recording her first album Chan Pen Chan Eang. In 1986, she released her second album Rao Me Rao. In 1991, she released her fourth album San Ying San Ya, which included the single "Fah Yang Mee Fon", which sold over 900,000 tapes.

== Personal life ==
She was married to Banjured Kridsanayut in 1995, and they had a daughter.

== Illness and death ==
Suttasunthorn was diagnosed with breast cancer in 2014, and cured in Siriraj Hospital. In March 2017, she was diagnosed with bone cancer. She died on 7 July 2017.
