= Loveaholic =

- Thai film poster
- Directed by: Ping Lumpraploeng
- Written by: Ping Lumpraploeng
- Produced by: Prachya Pinkaew; Sita Vosbein; Sukanya Vongsthapat
- Starring: Udom Taephanit; Wisa Saansaat
- Cinematography: Decha Srimantra
- Edited by: Tawat Siripong
- Music by: Nimit Jitranon; Banchit Na Phatthalung; Worawit Pikulthong; Ronnabpop Ukcaracha
- Distributed by: Sahamongkol Film International
- Release date: 27 July 2006
- Running time: 89 minutes
- Country: Thailand
- Language: Thai

Loveaholic (Thai: โคตรรักเอ็งเลย or Khoht-rak-eng-loei) is a 2006 Thai romantic comedy film directed by Ping Lumpraploeng and starring Thai comedian, Udom Taephanit.

== Synopsis ==
Rong, a comedy screenwriter, finds out his wife, Daeng, has had an affair with a physician. Rong's and Daeng's relationship had grown routine and boring, which was why Daeng had the affair. Rong quarrels with Daeng, who angrily drives away in her car. Later, Rong is told that his wife is dead. Grieving, he blames himself for her death. However, Rong notices that many things in the house are being moved around, and he starts to think that perhaps Daeng is not dead.

== Cast ==
- Udom Taephanit as Rong
- Wisa Saansaat as Daeng
- Akara Amarttayakul as Raksa
- Achita Sikamana as Suay
- Ping Lumpraploeng
