= Thana Chatborirak =

Thai model and actor (born 1987)

- ธนา ฉัตรบริรักษ์
- Born: May 29, 1987 (age 38); Bangkok, Thailand
- Other name: Nong (Nickname)
- Education: Social Administration Thammasat University
- Occupation: Actor
- Years active: 2011 – present
- Agent: Channel 3 (2012 – 2018)
- Height: 1.80 m (5 ft 11 in)
- Parents: Lephong Mahanikhajorn (father); Ngamthip Chatborirak (mother)
- Relatives: Pakorn Chatborirak (brother); Pat Chatborirak (brother); Wanmai Chatborirak (sister)

Thana Chatborirak (Thai: ธนา ฉัตรบริรักษ์; born May 29, 1987, in Thailand), nickname Nong (Thai: หน่อง), is a Thai actor

== Early life and education ==
Thana was born on 29 May 1987 in Bangkok. Is the second son of Lephong Mahanikhajorn and Ngamthip Chatbirirak, with Thana having one brother, Pakorn Chatborirak and another brother, Pat Chatborirak and another adopted sister. One person is the new day Wanmai Chatborirak.

Thana graduated from Pongpoowadol Kindergarten, attended Assumption College (Thailand) And graduated from high school Triam Udom Suksa School And higher education. Previously, Thana studied at the Faculty of Science Chulalongkorn University and moved to study and graduate from Faculty of Social Administration Thammasat University

== Career ==
Thana entered the industry by being a guest of Pakorn, along with Pat chatborirak on the intoxicating program. After that, Channel 3 gave Nong to the series about recording karma, and after that, Nong signed a contract for actors under the channel 3

== Filmography ==
=== Film ===
Year	Title	Role	Notes
2014	Mun plaiw mak	Jack Biller, Apo, Tu, Ipe	
2018	Khun Bun Lue	Dr. Keerati	
2019	Chaeng	Sun	

=== Television series ===
Year	Title	Role	Network	Notes
2011	Sin Chronicle cring cringcı		Channel 3	short film
2011	The most famous movie of the weekend, when biting	Jot	Channel 3	short film
2012	Baan Nok Kao Krung	Thongklot (Lang)	Channel 3	
2012–2015	Jut Nat Pope	Kimhant (Kim)	Channel 3	
2013	Mae Pia Due	Liam	Channel 3	
2013	Khun Chai Pawornruj	Pakorn	Channel 3	
2013	Pooh Dee E Sarn	Sukhum	Channel 3	
2014	Ruk Ok Rit	Coppra	Channel 3	
2014	Rodfai Ruemay Likay Kongtai	Wayu	Channel 3	
2014	Tang Duen Hang Ruk	Jod	Channel 3	
2015	Kor Pen Jaosao Suk Krung Hai Cheun Jai	Chanchaat Kanchanaviphu	Channel 3	
2016	Tan Chai Kummalor	Ning Nong	Channel 3	Cameo
2017	Por Yung Lung Mai Wahng	Phichaichan Damrongrak (Tot)	Channel 3	
2018	Rai Sanaeha	Danu	GMM 25	
2018	It's Complicated	Frank	Line tv	
2018	Ruk Plik Lok	Nontawee	Channel 3	
2019	Gon Luang Tuang Nee Rak	Withit	Channel 3	
2019	Rak Nee Hua Jai Rao Jong	Tharm	GMM 25	
2019	Suparburoot Sut Soi	Vee	ONE 31	Cameo
2019	Rong Tao Naree	Sikon	Amarin TV	
2020	The Graduates	Thawa	Line tv	
2021	Remember You		True4U	Cameo
