= Hideko Nihei =

Japanese sprinter (born 1971)

Personal information
- Nationality: Japanese
- Born: Hideko Kijinami; 2 January 1971 (age 55) Fukushima Prefecture, Japan
- Education: Fukushima University Graduate Schools

Sport
- Country: Japan
- Sport: Track and field
- Event(s): 100 metres 200 metres

Achievements and titles
- Personal best(s): 100 m: 11.36 (2001); 200 m: 23.77 (2001)
Medal record
Women's athletics
Representing Japan
East Asian Games
Silver medal – second place	2001 Osaka	4×100 m relay

Hideko Nihei (二瓶 秀子, Nihei Hideko; née Kijinami (雉子波), born 2 January 1971 in Fukushima Prefecture) is a Japanese retired sprinter. She competed in the 4 × 100 metres relay at the 1997 World Championships. She is the former Japanese record holder in the 100 metres (11.36 seconds), 200 metres (23.82 seconds) and 4 × 100 metres relay (44.41 seconds).

She is currently the head coach at the Fukushima University Track Club.

== Personal bests ==
Event	Time (s)	Competition	Venue	Date	Notes
100 m	11.36 (wind: +1.8 m/s)	National University Individual Championships	Kitakami, Japan	14 July 2001	Former NR
200 m	23.77 (wind: 0.0 m/s)	National University Individual Championships	Kitakami, Japan	15 July 2001	

== International competition ==
Year	Competition	Venue	Position	Event	Time
Representing Japan
1997	World Championships	Athens, Greece	15th (sf)	4×100 m relay	44.56 (relay leg: 1st)
2001	East Asian Games	Osaka, Japan	5th	100 m	11.80 (wind: +1.1 m/s)
2001	East Asian Games	Osaka, Japan	2nd	4×100 m relay	44.24 (relay leg: 3rd)
