= Jah Choey =

Jah Choey (Thai: จ่าเฉย, RTGS: Cha Choei, lit. "Sergeant Idle") is a traffic police figure in Bangkok, the capital city of Thailand. It is commonly seen at main junctions’ roads.

Jah Choey was introduced in 2007 by Vibhavadi Hospital. It was designed to help ease the work of Thai traffic police officers. Then Vibhavadi Hospital had collaborated with other private sectors to produce Jah Choey (Ratsiri, 2009). The name "Jah Choey" came from two Thai words: jah which means "sergeant" and choey which means "idle" or "staying still".

The main purpose of Jah Choey was to reduce the number of traffic offenders and the number of accidents. They are strategically placed at areas that have a high number of offenders and accidents, so it can ease the work of Thai police.

Jah Choey was produced in two typical postures of traffic Police officer: smiling saluting posture and standing upright with a serious face. The heights are half body and full body (180 cm).
