= Hideko =

- Gender: Female

Origin
- Origin: Japanese
- Meaning: Different meanings depending on the kanji used

Hideko (written: 英子, 秀子, 日出子 or ひで子) is a feminine Japanese given name. Notable people with the name include:

- Hideko Fukuda (福田 英子; 1865–1927), Japanese writer
- Hideko Fukushima (福島 秀子; 1927–1997), Japanese avant-garde painter
- Hideko Goto (後藤 英子), Japanese former international table tennis player
- Hideko Hiranaka (平中 秀子; born 1973), Japanese medley swimmer
- Hideko Inoue (井上 秀子; 1875–1963), Japanese educator and peace activist
- Hideko Maehata (前畑 秀子; 1914–1995), Japanese swimmer
- Hideko Mizuno (水野 英子; born 1939), Japanese manga artist
- Hideko Mogami (最上 英子; 1902–1966), Japanese politician
- Hideko Nihei (二瓶 秀子; born 1971), Japanese retired sprinter
- Hideko Oka (岡 秀子; born 1953), Japanese fencer
- Hideko Saito (斎藤 ひで子; born 1950), Japanese cross-country skier
- Hideko Takahashi, Japanese illustrator
- Hideko Takamine (高峰 秀子; 1924–2010), Japanese actress
- Hideko Udagawa, Japanese classical violinist
- Hideko Yoshida (吉田 日出子; born 1944), Japanese actress
