= Sunset at Chaophraya (2013 film) =

- Film poster
- Directed by: Kittikorn Liasirikun
- Screenplay by: Kittikorn Liasirikun; Damkerng Thitapiyasak
- Based on: Khu Kam by Thommayanti
- Produced by: Jantima Liawsirikun
- Starring: Nadech Kugimiya; Oranate D.Caballes
- Cinematography: Sarawut Wichiensarn
- Edited by: Nitipoj Kositngamdeewongse
- Distributed by: M39 Pictures
- Release date: 4 April 2013
- Running time: 130 minutes
- Country: Thailand
- Languages: Thai; Japanese
- Box office: ฿55 million

Sunset at Chaophraya (Thai: คู่กรรม, Khu Kam) in 2013 romantic-war-drama film directed by Kittikorn Liasirikun. Adapted from the novel Khu Kam by Thommayanti, the story is a love triangle, set in World War II-era Thailand, and depicts the star-crossed romance between an Imperial Japanese Navy officer and a Thai woman who is involved with the Free Thai resistance. It was released on 4 April 2013. One of top five box office hits (Thailand film) in 2013.

Starring Nadech Kugimiya as Kobori, a Japanese Military Officer who is in the Japanese troop that invaded Thailand, and Oranate D. Caballes as Angsumalin (Hideko), a young Thai woman whose feelings towards Kobori are complicated by her strong, anti-Japanese sense of nationalism and her intention to romantically commit to a childhood friend upon his return from abroad.

The story depicts first love from the perspective of young characters, and how it affects their lives and their aspirations.

Kugimiya and Caballes made their feature debuts in this film.

== Plot ==
Set in 1939, the early days of World War II in Thailand, the film begins with Angsumalin meeting for one last time with her childhood friend, a young Thai man named Vanus. He is leaving for England for schooling, and hopes that Angsumalin will wait for him and marry him when he returns.

Shortly thereafter, Thailand is invaded by Japanese military forces. In Thonburi, opposite Bangkok on the Chaophraya River, the Imperial Japanese Navy establishes a base. The forces there are led by Kobori, an idealistic young captain. One day he sees Angsumalin swimming in the river and falls for her. She, being a proudly nationalistic Thai woman, despises him because he is a foreigner.

Nonetheless, Kobori persists at seeing her and a courtship develops. Angsumalin finds that Kobori is a gentleman and starts falling for him, but she kept her feelings secret because of the war and because of her involvement with the resistance.

Then, for political reasons, Angsumalin's father - who is the leader of the Free Thai resistance, insists that she marry Kobori. Understanding that Angsumalin is not marrying him out of love, Kobori promises not to touch her, but he breaks that vow after the wedding.

Despite this, Angsumalin develops tender feelings for Kobori, but is still torn by her feelings for her nation and feeling guilty towards Vanus, upon whose return sets in motion a conflict between the two men.

== Cast ==
- Nadech Kugimiya as Kobori
- Oranate D.Caballes as Angsumalin (in Japanese name Hideko)
- Nitis Warayanon as Vanus
- Surachai Juntimakorn as Pol
- Mongkol U-tok as Bua
- Tatsunobu Tanikawa as Yoshi
- Kullapong Boonnak as Angsumalin's father
- Mereena Mungsiri as Angsumalin's mother
- Jumnean Jareansub as Angsumalin's grandmother

== Accolades ==
Year	Award	Category	Nominee	Result
2014	Suphannahong National Film Awards	Best Actor	Nadech Kugimiya	Won
2014	Suphannahong National Film Awards	Most Popular Actor	Nadech Kugimiya	Won
2014	Suphannahong National Film Awards	Best Costume Design	Worathon Kritsanaklin	Won
2014	Suphannahong National Film Awards	Best Make-up	Montri Wadia-Iad	Nominated
2014	Suphannahong National Film Awards	Best Original Song	Vichaya Vatanasapt	Nominated
2014	Suphannahong National Film Awards	Best Visual Effects		Nominated
2014	STARPICS Film Awards	Best Actor	Nadech Kugimiya	Won
2014	Kom Chud Luek Awards	Best Actor	Nadech Kugimiya	Won
2014	Bangkok Critics Assembly Awards	Best Actor	Nadech Kugimiya	Won
