= Thawiphop =

1986 Thai historical romance novel by Thommayanti

Thawiphop (Thai: ทวิภพ, lit. 'Two Worlds') is a 1986 Thai historical romance novel written by Thommayanti. It tells the story of Maneechan, a contemporary woman who is transported back in time via a magical mirror to the late 19th century, during the reign of King Chulalongkorn (Rama V). There she falls in love with a young nobleman, and ultimately ends up helping defend the country against the threat of colonisation by the French and the British.

The novel has become widely popular, and has been adapted into multiple television series, films and musicals. It has been cited by scholars as a prominent example of nationalist thought in mainstream Thai literature.

== Adaptations ==
Thawiphop has seen many adaptations, including:

- Films
  - Thawiphop (1990), directed by Cherd Songsri
  - The Siam Renaissance (2004), directed by Surapong Pinijkhar
- TV series
  - Thawiphop (1994), produced by Dara Video and broadcast on Channel 7
  - Thawiphop (2011), also produced by Dara Video and broadcast on Channel 7
- Stage plays
  - Thawiphop: The Musical (2005), directed by Takonkiet Viravan and produced by Scenario
  - Thawiphop: The Musical (2011), also directed by Takonkiet Viravan and produced by Scenario
