= The Con-Heartist =

- Directed by: Mes Thrathorn
- Starring: Nadech Kugimiya; Pimchanok Luevisadpaibul
- Production company: Widescreen Film
- Distributed by: GDH
- Release date: December 3, 2020
- Country: Thailand
- Language: Thai
- Box office: ฿95.5m

The Con-Heartist (Thai: อ้าย..คนหล่อลวง) it is a Thai romantic-comedy film directed by Mes Thrathorn, produced by Widescreen Film and distributed by GDH, starring Nadech Kugimiya and Pimchanok Luevisadpaibul. It was officially scheduled for release on Thursday, December 3, 2020.

== Cast and Character ==
=== Main Character ===
- Nadech Kugimiya as Tower

The leader of a scam gang who is handsome, good-looking, and cool, but missed a call the telephone to meet with Ina until he is almost arrested and sent to the police and he has therefore must cooperate with Ina on a this mission.

- Pimchanok Luevisadpaibul as Ina

former bank employee, who was call the phone by Tower, in the hopes of scam money, but was caught first, her teamed up with Tower to scam money from Petch, her ex-boyfriend.

- Thiti Mahayotaruk as Petch

Ina's ex-boyfriend likes to deceive women's money to pamper himself

- Pongsathorn Jongvilas as Bandit (โจร)

Tower's older brother is a former criminal and scam gang who goes in and out of the prison all time.

- Kathaleeya McIntosh as Teacher Nongnuch

Ina's elementary school teacher love Ina like a her child but must join the mission to help her beloved disciple and pay off a large debt of herself.

== Production ==
Wannarudee Pongsittisak GDH producers stated at the GDH Xtraordinary 2021 Line-up press conference that GDH had long wanted to make a movie about scam gangs. The main concept is Jira's idea. In the actor's part, Nadech listening to the initial details and immediately agreed to play.

=== Movie Soundtracks ===
As for the music for the film's soundtrack, GDH had Hua Lamphong Riddim, to make the soundtrack, with Wichaya Wattanasap as the composer of all the melodies. for the main soundtrack, I'm not Con-Heartist sung by BamBam GOT 7 and composed a petition by Third TillyBirds.

== Released ==
Production news for the film began in July 2020, when GDH revealed the cast of the new film, featuring Nadech Kugimiya, Pimchanok Luevisadpaibul and Thiti Mahayotaruk is the 3 main actors and is scheduled to premiere in late 2020 as a gift and encouragement to Thai audiences after the state of the country fell heavily from the spread of COVID-19.

The film made its official debut on Wednesday, September 23, 2020, where GDH held a press conference, the GDH Xtraordinary 2021 Line-up for the official release of the film, The Con-Heartist, and set its official premiere date is Thursday, December 3, 2020, at Paragon Cineplex, Siam Paragon. Two additional main actors were also announced, Pongsathorn Jongwilas and Kathaleeya McIntosh, and described the film's main story line as: It is related to scams.
