= Nadech Kugimiya =

Thai actor (born 1991)

- ณเดชน์ คูกิมิยะ
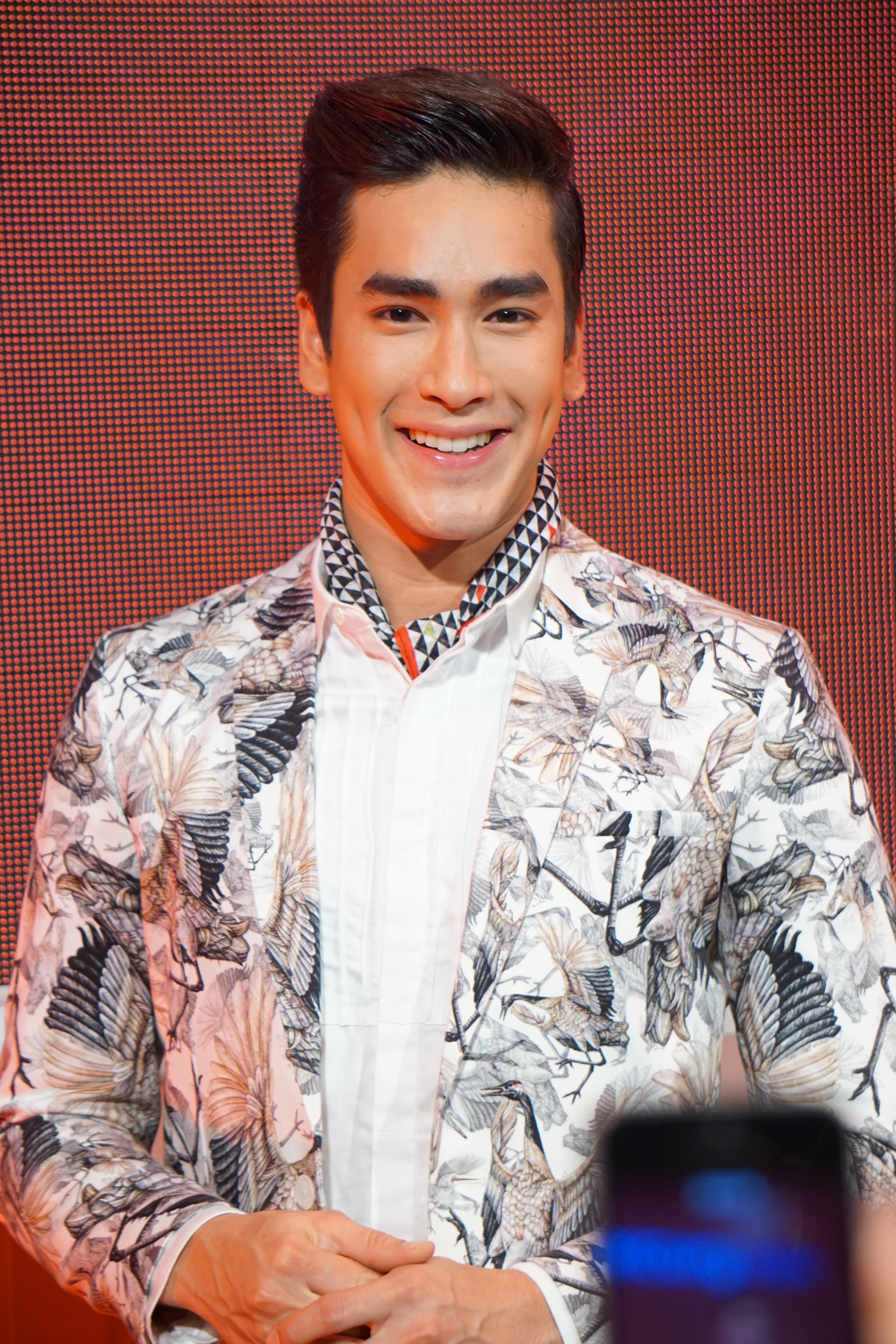
- Nadech in 2014
- Born: Chonlathit Yodprathum; December 17, 1991 (age 34); Khon Kaen, Thailand
- Other name: Barry
- Education: Rangsit University
- Occupations: Actor; singer
- Years active: 2009–present
- Height: 178 cm (5 ft 10 in)
- Spouse: Urassaya Sperbund (m. 2026)
- Awards: Full list

Signature
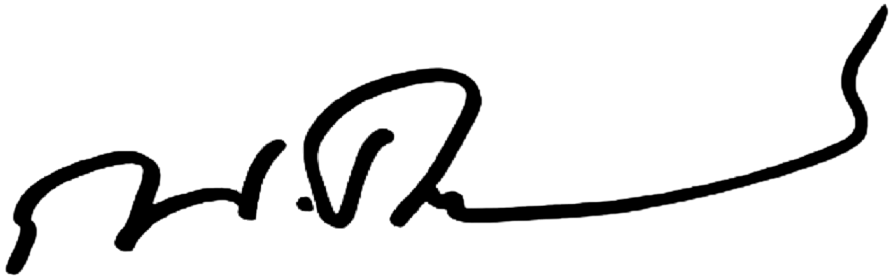

Nadech Kugimiya (Note: Thai: ณเดชน์ คูกิมิยะ, RTGS: Nadet Khukimiya, Thai pronunciation: [ná.dèt kʰuː.kì.mí.já]) (born December 17, 1991) is a Thai actor. He is best known for his roles in Duang Jai Akkanee (2010), Game Rai Game Rak (2011), Sunset at Chaophraya (2013), The Rising Sun Series (2014), Leh Lub Salub Rarng (2017), The Crown Princess (2018), My Love from the Star (Thai version) (2019), The Con-Heartist (2020) and Death Whisperer (2023).

== Early life and education ==
Nadech Kugimiya, born Chonlathit Yodprathum, was born on December 17, 1991 in Khon Kaen, Thailand. He is the adopted child of Sudarat Kugimiya (his biological aunt) and Yoshio Kugimiya. His biological mother is Thai and his biological father is Austrian. His nickname, "Barry", has evolved from his original nickname, "Brand". He graduated from Rangsit University with a bachelor's degree in communications, majoring in Film and Cinematography. He then graduated with a master's degree in May 2020.

== Career ==
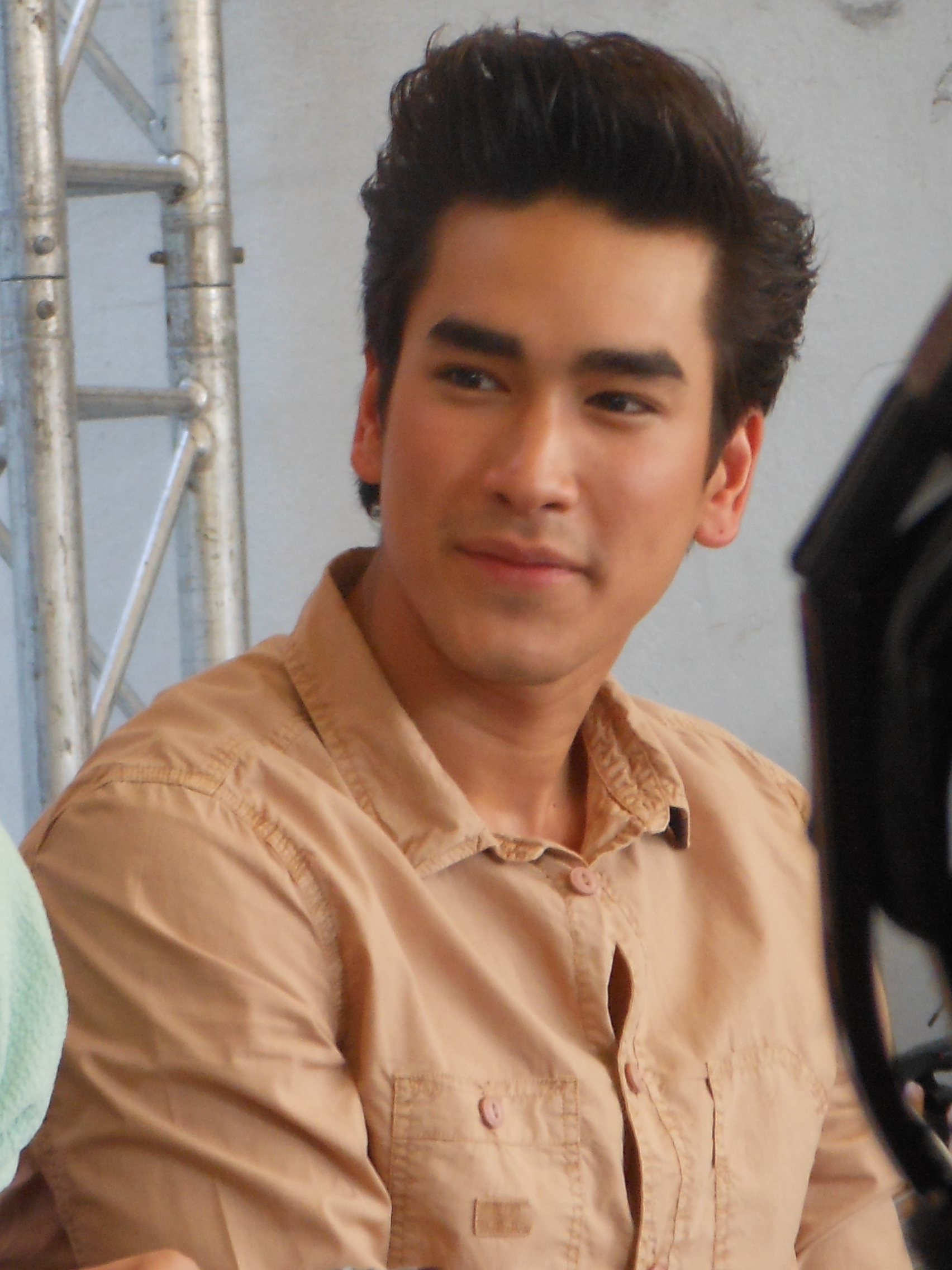
Nadech in November 2013

Nadech first appeared in a Trident Recaldent chewing gum ad in which he starred alongside Thai actress Patcharapa Chaichua. In 2010, he made his acting debut in a feature drama, starring in the lead role, in Ngao Rak Luang Jai as "Nawa Gamtornpuwanat". He gained wide recognition after he starred in Duang Jai Akkanee as "Fai Akkanee Adisuan" and in Game Rai Game Rak as "Saichon / Charles Makovich" alongside Urassaya Sperbund. He was also a member of the group 4+1 Channel 3 Superstar with Mario Maurer, Prin Suparat, Pakorn Chatborirak, and Phupoom Pongpanu. He has an exclusive contract with Channel 3 (Thailand), with Suphachai Srivijit being his manager.

He is one of the highest paid actors in Thailand. Nadech is also a large brand endorser; he has been dubbed "King of Presenters." He has endorsed numerous major brands including Shopee, OPPO, 7-Eleven, AIR ASIA, Daikin, and TrueMove H. He is also one of the most visible celebrities in television, print, and billboard advertisements.

Nadech is considered one of the most decorated Thai actors. He has received more than 100 awards including the Best Actor award from the Suphannahong National Film Awards, Mekhala Awards, Nataraja Awards, and TV Gold Awards. Nadech frequently appears on the list of the most popular and influential people in Thailand.

== Business ==
Nadech teamed up with Prin Suparat and 2 other non-industry friends to open a business called TheReCrafting, which is a brand of leather goods and a complete leather spa including shoes, clothes and bags. He also teamed up with another non-industry friend to open an athlete potential development center called Sport Tech Pro in Ekkamai area.

On June 25, 2026, Nadech, Prin Suparat, and Attaphol Phohanrattanakul jointly registered the establishment of OKOK Production Co., Ltd., a agency and production house, with a registered capital of 1 million THB.

== Personal life ==
Nadech has been in a relationship with Urassaya Sperbund since 2011. On June 5, 2023, Nadech and Urassaya jointly announced that they got engaged in Positano, Italy via Instagram. The couple got married on April 17, 2026, just a few days after Songkran, in Khon Kaen, Nadech's hometown, with a traditional Isan-themed wedding.

== Filmography ==
=== Film ===
Year	Title	Role	Notes
2013	Sunset at Chaophraya	Kobori	Debut film
2013	Long Rak Loey	Napat	Short film
2014	Postcard	Natee	Short film
2015	Mr.Peter's Project	Peter	Short film (Also director)
2018	Krut: The Himmaphan Warriors	Phaya Watchara Garuda (Voice)	Animated film
2018	Nakee 2	Pongprap	
2020	The Con-Heartist	Tower	
2023	Death Whisperer	Yak	
2024	Death Whisperer 2	Yak	
2024	Mufasa: The Lion King	Mufasa (Voice)	Animated film
2025	Jurassic World Rebirth	Henry Loomis (Voice)	Jurassic Park franchise
2025	Death Whisperer 3	Yak	
2025	The Debt Collector	Num	
2026	Henry's First Dates	Henry	
2026	Death Whisperer: Saming the Werebeast	Yak	

=== Television ===
Year	Title	Role	Production	Network
2010	Ngao Rak Luang Jai	Nawa Gamtornpuwanat	Maker-Y	CH3 SET Metro
2010	Thara Himalaya	Akkanee Adisuan (Fai)	Maker-Y	CH3 SET Metro
2010	Duang Jai Akkanee	Akkanee Adisuan (Fai)	No Problem	CH3 SET Metro
2010	Pathapee Leh Ruk	Akkanee Adisuan (Fai)	Good Feeling	CH3 SET Metro
2010	Wayupak Montra	Akkanee Adisuan (Fai)	Act Art Generation	CH3 SET Metro
2011	Game Rai Game Rak	Saichon / Charles Makovich	Lakorn Thai	CH3 SET Metro
2012	Torranee Ni Nee Krai Krong	Athit	No Problem	CH3 SET Metro
2013	Rang Pratana	Pittaya	Lakorn Thai	CH3 SET Metro
2014	The Rising Sun: Roy Ruk Hak Liam Tawan	Ryu Onizuka	Maker-Y	CH3 SET Metro
2014	The Rising Sun: Roy Fun Tawan Duerd	Ryu Onizuka	Maker Group	CH3 SET Metro
2015	Lom Sorn Ruk	Pranon / Pran	No Problem	CH3 SET Metro
2015	Tarm Ruk Keun Jai	Seehanat (Nai Singh)	Lakorn Thai	CH3 SET Metro
2017	Leh Lub Salub Rang	Captain Ramin Toongpraplerng	No Problem	CH3 SET Metro
2018	The Crown Princess	Lieutenant Commander Davin Samuthyakorn	Thong Entertainment	CH3 SET Metro
2019	My Love from the Star (Thai version)	Achira	Broadcast Thai TV	CH3 SET Metro
2021	Monrak Nong Phak Kayaeng	Tarakorn / Kiew	Act Art Generation	CH3 SET Metro
2022	Lai Kinnaree	Luang In	Act Art Generation	CH3 SET Metro
2023	Doctor Detective	KhunKhao Worapudchai (Khun)	Magic If One	CH3 SET Metro
2025	Captive Heart	Ok Khun Saeng Phlan	Good Feeling	CH3 SET Metro
2026	Brothers	Eob Sommaphakun	Hok See Eiaw	CH3 SET Metro

== Discography ==
Year	Song title	Notes
2012	"Hai Rak Man Toh Nai Jai" ("Let Love Grow Up In My Heart")	Torranee Ni Nee Krai Krong OST
2013	"Angsumalin" ("Angsumalin")	Sunset at Chaophraya OST
2013	"Long Rak Loey" ("Falling In Love")	Long Rak Loey OST
2014	"Laew Rao Ja Rak Gan Dai Mai" ("Can We Love Each Other?")	The Rising Sun Series OST
2014	"1,2,3,4,5 I Love You"	Give Me 5 Concert Rate A
2015	"Tee Jing Chan Gor Jeb" ("Actually, I'm Also Hurt")	Lom Sorn Ruk OST
2015	"Kam Tob Sud Tai" ("Final Answer")	Mr.Peter's Project OST
2016	"Happy Birthday"	Channel 3 Anniversary Concert
2018	"Nah Tee Gub Hua Jai" ("Duty And Heart")	The Crown Princess OST
2019	"No Caption"	The Real Nadech Concert
2019	"Rak Tee Ror Wan La" ("The Love that is Waiting for Saying Goodbye")	My Love from the Star (Thai version) OST
2020	"Orbit"	The first self-made single
2021	"Isan Ban Hao"	Monrak Nong Phak Kayaeng OST
2021	"Chouw Nang Hed Na (Version Kiew)"	Monrak Nong Phak Kayaeng OST
2021	"Bak Tang Kwa"	Monrak Nong Phak Kayaeng OST
2021	"Kho Chai Kam Wha Fan"	Monrak Nong Phak Kayaeng OST
2021	"Ma Der Kwan Aey"	Monrak Nong Phak Kayaeng OST
2021	"Mee Bird"	Monrak Nong Phak Kayaeng OST
