= Pob Pee Fa (2009 TV series) =

- Promotional poster
- Genre: Superstition horror period (Kantana Video Production)
- Created by: นิรัติศัย กัลย์จาฤก
- Opening theme: Pob Pee Fa (ปอบผีฟ้า)
- Country of origin: Thailand
- No. of episodes: 14

Production
- Running time: Approx. 60-70 minutes (per episode)

Original release
- Network: BBTV Channel 7
- Release: February 4, 2009

Pob Pee Fa (Thai: ปอบผีฟ้า; RTGS: Pop Phi Fa) is a Thai period horror lakorn, a remake of the 1997 lakorn Pob Pee Fa with the role of Pee Fah or Jao Nang Luang on Torn played by the awarding winning actress, Chiranan Manochaem (จีระนันท์ มะโนแจ่ม). Other scheduled cast members include Thana Suttikamul (ธนา สุทธิกมล) and the Thai-British model and actress, Buntitha Puwijarn Cowell (บัณฑิตา ภูวิจารณ์ เคาวเวลล์).

== Plot ==
Pob Pee Fa is the story of a princess who is turned into an ogress (Pee Fah) after eating the past generations of Pee Fah nectar that caused by unrequited love. She starts hunting for raw intestines and fresh blood, which revolved for several generations with her love enemies.

The real identity of Pee Fah is Phi Pop (ผีปอบ), a ghost of popular Thai folklore.

== Incidents during filming ==
Several of the actors in Pob Pee Fa were involved in incidents during filming. An unexplained fire broke out in one of the vans. The actors Ah’Dao Duangdao Jarujinda (ดวงดาว จารุจินดา), Ae Pornthip and Chiranan Manochaem were all hospitalized. A cameraman was hit with a stray bullet during the filming of a sword fighting scene.

=== Chiranan Manochaem ===
After finishing two episode of the series, Chiranan Manochaem, was interviewed during the opening ceremony which was held on October 7, 2008. According to the newspaper, Siam Dara, Yui Jiranan said, "I’ve only read two episodes of the script so far and I have nightmares each night…and that’s just reading the first two parts! Normally I’m already afraid of ghosts, now I don’t even watch horror movies but I have to star in a horror lakorn. I’m afraid already just reading it especially of the scene where I have to drink the nectar of the ghosts and become a ogress. I’ve taken it and dreamt about every scene as if it was real. When I wake up, which is around 3 A.M. I can’t go back to sleep, I’m really scared."

As with the original when Woranut Wongsawan mentioned how frightening the role would be, Yui Jiranan also said that it was shocking to act in.

Manochaem said in interview that her role for the good person does not benefit her but the role of the bad character could bring her an award.
