= Sornram Teppitak =

Thai actor-singer (born 1973)

- ศรราม เทพพิทักษ์
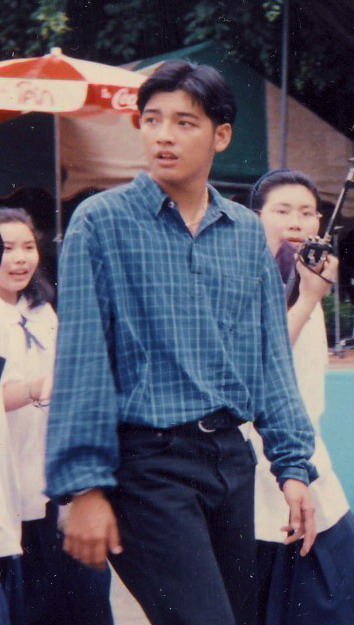
- Sornram in 90s

Personal details
- Born: 22 August 1973 (age 53) Bangkok, Thailand
- Spouse: Kanitrin Patcharaphakdichoti (m. 2018; div. 2020)
- Children: 1
- Parents: Chumphon Teppitak (father); Mayuri Teppitak (mother)
- Occupation: Sportsman; footballer; actor; screenwriter; film director

Military service
- Allegiance: Thailand
- Branch/service: Royal Thai Army
- Years of service: 2000–2002
- Rank: Private 1st Class
- Battles/wars: 1999 East Timorese crisis; International Force East Timor

Sornram Teppitak (Thai: ศรราม เทพพิทักษ์, RTGS: Son-ram Thepphi-thak; also spelled as "Sornram Theppitak"; born August 22, 1973, in Thonburi side, Bangkok, Thailand or nickname Num or Noom (Thai: หนุ่ม; RTGS: Num) is a Thai actor and Thai pop singer after being a footballer. He has appeared in several notable lakorns, including: Dao pra sook with Suvanant Kongying which he played the role of Phak, Khun Poh Rub-Jang (Daddy for Hire) and Duang Jai Patiharn (Miracle of the Heart). He began acting at an adolescent age. His films include Garuda (Paksa wayu) and First Flight. He obtained a Bachelor's degree in Social Science from Ramkhamhaeng University. In the 1990s, the golden age of lakorn, he was the most popular and highest-paid Thai actor. Every lakorn he performed in with Channel 7 was a success.

== Personal life ==
=== Early life ===
Sornram was born into a family of actors. His father, Chumphon Teppitak, was an actor, director, and producer who rose to fame in the 1950s—the golden age of Thai cinema—and was a close friend of two of Thailand's most legendary actors, Mitr Chaibancha and Sombat Methanee. The name "Sornram" was inspired by the protagonist of Nueng Nuch, a 1971 Thai musical drama film starring Sombat, Pisamai Vilaisak, and Chumphon himself.

=== Married life ===
In 2018, he married Kanitrin Patcharaphakdichoti in a simple wedding ceremony. On April 8, 2019, his wife gave birth to a girl named Veeji.

== Filmography ==
=== Film ===
Year	Thai title	Title	Role	Note	Reference
1993	แดดร้อนลมแรง ความรักกำลังจะมา	Daderon Lomrang Kwarm Rukgum Lung Ja Ma			
1993	ฉันหรือเธอที่เผลอใจ	Chan Rue Tur Tee Pluer Jai			
1993	ฮัลโหล ขอรบกวนหน่อย	Hello Kor Rob Kuan Noi Na			
1994	หัวใจใครจะรู้	Huajai Krai Roo			
1994	แบบว่าโลกนี้มีน้ำเต้าหู้และครูระเบียบ	Numtaohoo & Kru rabearb	Kan		
1997	ฝันติดไฟ หัวใจติดดิน	Dreamers	Nai		
1999	แตก 4 รัก โลภ โกรธ เลว	Friendship Breakdown	Diaw		
2000	รักไม่ถึงร้อย	Rak Mai Tung Roy			
2004	ปักษาวายุ	Garuda	Tan		
2005	พยัคฆ์ร้ายส่ายหน้า	Dumber Heroes			
2008	รักสยาม เท่าฟ้า	First Flight	Downg		
2008	หนุมานคลุกฝุ่น	The White Monkey Warrior	Suthin		
2012	กาฝาก	Loranthaceae			

=== Dramas ===
Year	Title	Role	Network
1992	See Yaak Nee Ayu Noy	Anek	Channel 3
1992	Aroon Sawad	Pasu	Channel 7
1993	Payong	Hern Fa	Channel 7
1994	Narm Sai Jai Jing	Jumpol	Channel 7
1994	Mamia	Jao Noi Sukkasem	Channel 7
1994	Dao Pra Sook	Pak	Channel 7
1995	Kaw Morn Bai Nun Tee Tur Fun Yam Nun	Joon	Channel 7
1995	Sai Lohit	Khun Krai	Channel 7
1996	Dung Duang Haruetai	King Rangsimun	Channel 7
1999	Tee Yai	Kornprasert / Tee Yai	Channel 3
1999	Yord Ya Yee	Peelam	Channel 3
2000	Ban Sai Thong	Parada Patrapee Sawangwong / Chai Klang	Channel 3
2000	Ruk Pragasit	Phuchit	Channel 7
2001	Sing Tueng	Sing Tueng	Channel 3
2002	Phukong Yod Rak, Yod Rak Phukong	Pan Namsupan	Channel 3
2003	Hark Liem Prakarn	Kom	Channel 3
2003	Jone Plone Jai	Puripat	Channel 7
2004	Koo Gum	Kobori	Channel 3
2004	Wan Jai Thailand	Khim-han	Channel 3
2004	Khun Por Rub Jang	Wongrapee	Channel 7
2005	Tae Pang Korn	Than Chai Yai	Channel 3
2005	Ruk Kong Nai Dok Mai	Rachapreuk / Nai Dok Mai	Channel 3
2006	Hima Tai Prajun	Anecha	Channel 3
2006	Duang Jai Patiharn	Techo	Channel 7
2007	Fah Mee Tawan Hua Jai Chun Me Ter	Poramee / Paul	Channel 7
2009	Mae Ying	Khun Kag / Praam Theparaj	Channel 7
2010	Sira Patchara Duang Jai Nak Rope	Prince Pachara / Win Sadawuru	Channel 3
2011	Ngao Pray	Sakkaya	Channel 3
2012	Meu Prab Por Look Orn	Krit	Channel 3
2013	Maya Tawan	Shane Cross	Channel 3
2013	Peak Marn	Puchai	Channel 5
2014	Look Tard	Nitithom Ruaocha	Channel 3
2014	Likay Likay	Phongthep	Channel 5
2015	Ban Lang Mek	Wasuthep Nateepitak	One 31
2015	Prissana	Taan Chai Puthpreecha	PPTVHD36
2015	Rattanawadee	Taan Chai Puthpreecha	PPTVHD36
2016	Saluk Jit	Chai Diew / Phoosit	One 31
2017	Nam So Sai	Prim Prapapan	Channel 7
2017	Sri Ayodhaya	Taksin the Great	True4U
2019	Samee See Thong	Jiad	Amarin TV 34
2020	Prai Sungkeet	Terd	Channel 7
2020	Phariya	Isaret	Channel 8
2020	Bangkert Klao	Chatcharin	Amarin TV 34
2022	Plerng Kinnaree	Singkarn	Channel 7
2023	Club Friday The Series : Love Begins	Pisal	One 31
2023	The Bride of Naga	Dr. Preeda	One 31
2024	Wiyan Phaesaya	Chao Luang Kamjaisaeng / Thao Kamjai	Channel 8

=== Series ===
Year	Thai title	Title	Role	Network	Notes	With
2016	คลับฟรายเดย์เดอะซีรีส์ 7 เหตุเกิดจากความรัก ตอน รักลวง	Club Friday The Series Season 7: The Fault of Love	Bordin	GMM 25		Amika Klinpratoom
2016	Patihan The Series	Patihan The Series	Angel	PPTVHD36		
2017	Club Friday the Series 9 ตอน รักปลอมปลอม	Club Friday The Series 9 Episodes Fake Love	Yo	GMM 25		Kaneungnij Jaksamittanon

=== Sitcom ===
Year	Thai title	Title	Role	Network	Notes	With
2017	ขวัญใจไทยแลนด์	Kwan Jai Thailand	Kong Kampon	Workpoint TV		Suvanant Punnakant

=== Special ===
- Bury Burum (1992)
- Mrs. Slavery (1993)
- May Miya (1994)
- Thong Lang Phra (2000)
- Maha Sanuk Shop (Sitcom) (2003)
- Battle of the Bones into the Lotus (Drama to honor) (2005)
- Is the bond of love (Drama to honor) (2007)
- Love Our House (drama to honor) (2008)
- 12 brave heroes of Siam: Brahma the Great (Drama to honor) (2009)
- Closed behind the scenes at the highest dreams. (Drama to honor) (2009)
- The Three Sisters of Chaos (2011)

=== Ads ===
- Brand Rollon
- Agfa
- Tamjai
- Hotta

=== Advertising ===
Year	Thai title	Title	Notes	With
2020	ถั่งเช่าผสมมัลติวิตามินบี			
20				

=== Master of Ceremony: MC ON TV ===
Year	Thai title	Title	Network	Notes
2003-2008	เมืองไทยวาไรตี้		5HD1	
2009-2010	ฟ้าห่มดิน		5HD1	
2020	ถามสุดซอย Weekend		Nation TV 22	

=== Business executive ===
- Executive, Rittiram Company Limited
- Managing Director: Ritthiram Co., Ltd.

=== Portfolio of books ===
- Polsaram books according to the regulations
- Pantry book
