= Poot Mae Nam Khong =

- Thai teaser poster
- Created by: Sumruay Rukchart
- Opening theme: 2535 - 2536 " Poot Mae Nam Khong " 2551 " Mot Jai Khong Chun Ku Toe " 2565 " Chun Young Kid Tueng " " Sai Nam Gub Kwarm Rak "
- Country of origin: Thailand
- No. of episodes: 50

Production
- Running time: approx. 60-70 minutes (per episode)

Original release
- Network: BBTV Channel 7
- Release: 28 December 1992 – 2 March 1993
- Release: 4 October – 7 November 2008
- Network: Channel 3
- Release: 20 August – 23 September 2022

Related
- Silamanee

Poot Mae Nam Khong (Thai: ภูตแม่น้ำโขง, RTGS: Phut Mae Nam Khong, literally The Spirit of Mekong River ) is a Thai Horror Superstition Lakorn, remade from 1990 lakorn of the same name. The lakorn starring by Weir Sukollawat and Jui Warattaya as the Main roles and Morakot Aimee Kittisara as the ghost.

== Summary ==
Every river has its own soul as vengeance never dies.

Dr. Akkanee and his crew travels to a village that is old fashion and superstitious to study the paranormal and that prove that it is not true. In the village he meets and falls for a girl named Bunpaun. He is curious about her since he often dreams about her before coming to the village. The village is close to the Mekong river, which the villagers believe house spirits and deities. This is true as a spirit of a vengeful princess resides underneath the river waiting for her betrothal, which is the reincarnated Dr. Akkanee.

In a previous life, Dr. Akkanee traveled from his land to marry the princess. The princess is taken with him when they first meet and immediately falls in love with him. Dr. Akkanee tells her that he wants to become a monk for a short while to dedicate his life to prayer and contemplation. The princess compromises and agrees to postpone the wedding. One day she goes to his room to bring him snacks and catches him with her younger sister, who she is very close too and the reincarnated Bunpaun, in an innocent yet intimate moment. It was obvious that the two were seeing each other behind her back. In rage, princess cursed them both and vows revenge for their betrayal. The hatred she had for the two caused her to lose her beauty and become a vicious spirit that plagues the village.

In the present time, Bunpaun finds an enormous egg at the bank of Mekong river and is compelled to eat. When she ate it, it turned her into a vassal, possessed by the princess now queen (or the Mother) of Mekong river who had long lusted for revenge. After the possession, Bunpaun disappeared from the village. When she returned, carrying the dreadful spirit inside her, the evil queen began killing local young girls one by one in order sustain her power. No exorcist got rid of her, no technology destroyed her, only the true love of Bunpaun and Dr. Ake was able to break into her vengeful heart......

== Cast ==
1992

- Sattawat Doonwichit as Dr. Akkanee
- Ratchaneekorn Phanmanee as Buapun
- Angkana Timdee as Jaomae Torhoog
- Thanin Thapmongkol as Dr. Uenngen
- Saowaluck Siriaran as Tongmee
- Somnapha Kasemsuwan as Jaomae Komedum
- Chumphorn Thepphithak as Naanlah
- Krung Srivilai as Joom
- Arpaporn Kornthip as Bunruean
- Sutee Siricharoen as Chao Worawong
- Poonsawat Themakorn as Taochianglah
- Jaran Petcharoen as Tayoi
- Damp Duskorn as Kumnunleng
- Thammasuk Suriyon as Kongta
- Joomjim Khemlek as Tangim
- Tuanthon Kamsri as Junti
- Ampol Suansuk as Noo
- Palm Rattanakul as Kumpoon
- Yollada Ronghanam as Nangkumpang
- Khaosai Galaxy as Tidden
- Panom Nopporn as Samai Ornsa

2008

- Sukollawat Kanarot as Dr. Akkanee
- Warattaya Nilkuha as Buapun
- Morakot Kittisara as Jaomae Torhoog
- Puchisa Thanapat as Jao Worawong
- Usanee Wattana as Jaomae Komedum
- Apichart Wongkawee as Dr. Uenngen
- Sicha Sritongsuk as Maisee
- Tongkao Pattarachokchai as Naanlah
- Chusri Chernyim as Samai Ornsa
- Nukkid Boonthong as Lungjundee
- Ram Woratham as Taochianglah
- Pongprayun Ratchaaphai as Joom
- Rachit Chumuang as Noo
- Prasong Saepaisarn as Kongta
- Napaparin Phatarayukawat as Tangim
- Tharin Isarangkul Na Ayudhaya as Kumpoon
- Pratamaporn Rattanapakdee as Tongmee
- Kitsadee Phuangprayong as Tidkane
- Phutharit Prombandal as Praya Nongharnluarng
- Parisa Tuntanavivat as Wianlae
- Khwanruedi Klomklom as Bunruean
- Klot Atthaseri as Kumnanleng

2022
Main

- Warit Sirisantana as Khun Saeng Muang (Nobles of Wiang Ya Nong) / Dr. Akkanee (The son of Dr. Prawet)
- Eisaya Hosuwan as Jaonang Kaew Baw Thong (Princess Wiangya Nong) / Buapun (Boonruen's daughter)
- Preeyakarn Jaikanta as Jaomae Torhoog (Princess Wiangya Nong) / Jaomae Torhoog (Poot Mae Nam Khong)
- Chanatip Phothongka as Phaya-Lue (I serve Sri Usa) / Thid-Ken (Thonmee fan has)
- Saranya Jumpatip as Kam-La (I'm a servant of Princess Kaew Buathong.) / Thonmee (Bua Pan's friend)

Supporting

- Paweena Charivsakul as Sri-Usa (Jaonang Kaew Baw Thong's mother) / Boonruen (Bua Pan's mother)
- Tee Doksadao as Jan Dee (Followers of Dr. Akanee)
- Jakkabum Chernyim as Samai Aonsa (Nang Khoi villagers/The caretaker of the doctor at the health station)
- Anna Chuancheun as Kamnan-Leng (Wian-Le 's father)
- Prasat Thong-Aram as Chang-La (Nang Khoi villagers)
- Chanidapa Pongsilpipat as Wian-Le (Lun) (Kamnan Leng's daughter)
- Nuttanee Sittisamarn as Khiao-Khom (Servant of Lady Weo Huk / Goddess Weo Huk)
- Jakkrit Ammarat as Jao Kam Fah (Jaonang Kaew Baw Thong's father) / Luang Por Jum (Phra Thu Dong)
- Wongwachira Petchkeaw as Phaya-Jan (Servant of Lady Weo Huk / Goddess Weo Huk)
- Chattarika Sittiprom as Jaosai Dara (Princess Muang Sri Pandon) / Jaonang Komkam (Chao Worawong's sister)
- Khunkanich Koomkrong as Kampeang (Nang Khoi villagers/The medium of Princess Kaew Phimpha of Nang Khoi Village)
- Passakorn Krausopon as Arjhan Sao (Sorcerer from the temple)
- Narissan Lokavit as Jao Yod Seuk (Prince Muang Sri Pandon) / Jao Worawong (Brother of Chao Nang Khom Kham)
- Kittitat Pradab as Phia-Kamsing (Nobles of Wiang Ya Nong) / Dr. Aun-Ngein (A friend of Dr. Akanee/Wife of Chao Nang Khom Kham)

Guest Appearances

- Athiwat Sanitwong Na Ayutthaya as Jao Mung Mueang (King Wiang Ya Nong / Jaonang Torhoog's father)
- Prangned Thajai as Jaonang Kaewpimpha (The noble deity of Nang Khoi Village)
- Nichaphat Rodsawed as Nang (Uncle Am's daughter/Nang Khoi villagers)
- Suttasitt Pottasak as Dr. Prawet (Dr. Akkanee's father)
- Rattikan Kaewkunya as Eib (Nang Khoi villagers)
- Ranee Phomyong as Pao (Nang Khoi villagers)
- Napong Sorin as Rak (Kannan-Leng Henchman)
- Chanachai Saijanhom as Yom (Kannan-Leng Henchman)
- Pattanaset Chiratharn as Doctor Lecturer
- Jatuporn Lakharn as Grandfather's ghost
- Jirapat Phanngoen as Jao Mahesak (protect the land)
- Boonsong Khiedthad as Nobles of Wiang Ya Nong
- Ronnakorn Sanitpraphasorn as Ghost of the nobles of Wiang Ya Nong
- Honey Saeng Saeng as Ghost of the nobles of Wiang Ya Nong
- Yanavee Guptavetin as Mother boy
- as Pai (Nang Khoi villagers)
- as Sang (Nang Khoi villagers)
- as Yoi (Nang Khoi villagers)
- as Am (Nang's father)
- as Luang Poo Khaw (Phra Thueng)
- as Jandee (young)
- as Khung-In (Nobles of Wiang Ya Nong)
- as Wang (a liquor store seller in Nang Khoi Village)
- as Phi Mahesak (protect the land)
- as Kraisorn (servant of Chao Worawong)
- as Fueng (servant of Chao Soi Dara) / Fong (servant of Chao Nang Khom Kham house)
- as Pang (Nang Khoi villagers)
- as Kam Fah (Nang Khoi villagers)
- as Buapun (chird)
- as Thid-Ken (chird)
- as Thonmee (chird)

== Reception ==
Poot Mae Nam Khong was well-received as a result of the number of satisfied viewers despite it disappointing some. The Lakorn became one of Rating hits for Ch7 during October 6–12 (refer to its second week of airing). The lakorn received a 13 rating from 6.73 million people watching ranked number #3 behind another 2 lakorn starring Pancake.

Now, the Lakorn ranked as one of Ch7’s hit makers for the second half of the year along with Silamanee and Muay Inter. It is reported that after the lakorn, the main actress, Jui Warattaya, become popular again after being absent from the big screen for long time.
