= Pop (ghost) =

Cannibalistic spirit of Thai folklore

Pop or Pob (Thai: ปอบ, pronounced [pɔːp̚]) is a cannibalistic spirit of Thai folklore. It manifests itself as a creature that likes to devour human viscera. Pop is related to the Phi Fa spirit.

== Legends ==
A traditional legend says that a long time ago, a flower could take control of them. Once, the prince said the magic words and entered the body of an animal. His servant overheard those words, repeated them, and entered the body of the prince. The servant fooled people into thinking he was the prince. Seeing this, the prince quickly entered the body of a bird and rushed to tell the truth to his wife. Upon hearing this, the prince's wife had the servant's body destroyed, and the prince challenged the false prince to enter the body of an animal. When the servant foolishly entered and took control of the animal's body, the real prince re-entered his own body. The servant was unable to re-enter his body as it was destroyed. Henceforth, his revenant spirit goes from one body to another, eating its intestines.

Village legends say that this ghost lives inside a sorceress and leaves her body during sleep. Before the witch can die, the spirit has to find a body into which the Pop will be transmitted by consuming some saliva from the old sorceress.

If these ghosts succeed in haunting someone, they will eat that person's intestines while sleeping. One rumored way to get rid of them is to call in a healing dancer, chasing away the Pop by spinning dance. When the patient is watching the dance, Pop will enter into the spinning movement and be chased from the body.

== Types of Pops ==
In Thai folklore, Pop spirits can be categorized into three main types, each with distinct characteristics:

- Pop Thammada (ปอบธรรมดา; 'Ordinary Pop'): This is a person possessed by a Pop spirit. In this case, the person and the Pop are essentially one and the same. When the host dies, the Pop within them dies as well, and the curse does not continue.
- Pop Chuea (ปอบเชื้อ; 'Hereditary Pop'): In some families, Pop is believed to be passed down from parent to child like a bloodline. If the parents are Pop, their children may inherit the spirit after the parents’ death. This type is considered particularly difficult to break, as it perpetuates across generations.
- Pop Laek Na (ปอบแลกหน้า; 'Face-Switching Pop'): This is a deceitful and cunning variant. When it possesses someone, it refuses to reveal its true master if questioned—often falsely accusing an innocent person instead. This type of Pop can also change its appearance to resemble another person, making it difficult to detect or expose.
- Ha Gom (ห่าก้อม; [haː˨˩ kɔːm˥˩]): Ha Gom is considered the supreme entity, the lord of all Pops. It commands lesser Pop spirits and even other types of ghosts as its subordinates. Unlike ordinary Pop, Ha Gom is not afraid of sunlight. It can shapeshift into a human or an animal and blend in among people during the day without arousing suspicion. It is unaffected by sacred objects, monks, or holy amulets. The only person capable of subduing it is a sorcerer (mor phi) who possesses spiritual power equal to or greater than its own.

In addition, especially among Isan people, it is believed that a Pop can take on the form of various animals. One of the most common is a black dog.

== History ==
One of the earliest known literary references to Pop appears in Ramphan Philap (รำพันพิลาป; 'Lament of Bewailment'), a poem written by Sunthorn Phu around 1842–1843. The spirit is mentioned briefly in a single line, yet it stands as the oldest recorded trace of Pop in Thai literary history.

In November 1892, during the reign of King Rama V, a notable incident was recorded in what is now Uttaradit town. It concerned an old Laotian man of Phuan descent, known as Ta Puang (ตาพวง, lit. 'The Old Puang') , who had arrived by raft along the Nan river and settled in a hut behind Wat Pak Fang. Though elderly, Ta Puang's skin remained strangely smooth, not pale and sickly but radiant, unlike that of an ordinary old man. Not long after his arrival, three young local women died under mysterious circumstances in quick succession. Rumors soon spread that Ta Puang was, in fact, a Pop in disguise.

This story was recorded in Vajrayana Viset (วชิรญาณวิเศษ), a periodical circulated among the educated elite of that era.

Another famous case occurred in 1908 at Ban Songyae, in what is now Yasothon province, home to St. Michael's Church, the largest wooden church in Thailand. It was said that Pop had possessed members of five families in the village. The situation was finally brought under control when two Catholic priests, Father Desaval and Father Ambrosio, performed an exorcism. (Note: Although many villagers believed that the priests performed an exorcism, historical accounts clarify that the ceremony consisted only of prayers and blessings. The perception of a "spirit banishment" likely arose from the ritual context and the calming effect it had on the community.) The incident left a lasting impression, with some villagers later converting to Christianity.

== In modern times ==
According to a Thai Rath news report on February 15, 1996, residents of a community in Bangkok's Bang Sue, kept watch for more than two weeks to determine whether an elderly woman named Yai Sao (ยายเสาร์, lit. 'The Old Sao') was a Pop spirit. She had once been well regarded by her neighbours but had suffered from chronic illness for over two years, her body wasting away from nearly 100 kg (220.5 lb) to extreme thinness. Relatives took her to hospital, where she was pronounced dead after about ten days of care. However, while her body was being prepared, she suddenly revived, leading doctors to monitor her for another two to three days. During this time, several patients in nearby beds died, even as her condition appeared to improve. After returning home, she avoided going out in the daytime and frequently asked her husband to buy raw blood dishes such as larb (ลาบ). Suspicion among the neighbours grew, and some sought to drive her out. When Thai Rath journalists investigated, they found that she was in fact only an elderly, stooped woman with limited mobility, living in an old wooden house. Originally from Roi Et, she had lived in an informal settlement in Bang Sue for decades. Upon learning that she had been accused of being a Pop, she reportedly wept.

In 2002, there was news published in the Kom Chad Luek newspaper that a pair of Pop were running rampant in the suburbs of Bangkok, around Bang Bon or Bang Khae. This pair of Pop appeared in the form of a monk holding a dog and a nun holding a cat. Some believed that they had come across the border from Laos. Frightened people reported the event to the police. This event also caused the price of nard (หนาด), a medicinal plant that Thais believe its leaves can ward off ghosts, causing its price to rise significantly, from 20 baht to 100 baht per plant. To make matters worse, there were also rumors that they had previously resided at Wat Suan Kaew in Nonthaburi province. Regarding this issue, Phra Phayom Kalayano, the abbot of the temple, said, "It's nonsense and delusional."

In 2007, following the mysterious and sudden deaths of four villagers in Kalasin province's Sam Chai district, some 1000 residents raised some 35,000 baht for an exorcism of Pop, allegedly dwelling in two of the female villagers.

In 2012, 10 males died suddenly in Pakse, Champasak province, Laos. People believed that these deaths were caused by Pop.

In February 2024, a young woman shared her experience on TikTok, saying that she was six months pregnant with her second child. One night, around 10:00 p.m., she left the house to go out for food. While walking, she noticed the smell of betel nut and a strange sweet scent that seemed to follow her. Later, she had a disturbing dream in which an old woman bit into her womb. She believed it was no ordinary dream, but a warning, a sign that a Pop had followed her home and was trying to devour the child growing inside her.

In late April 2025, a woman named Somkid, who lives in a village in Na Di district, Prachin Buri province, shared that for about six months, strange floating lights had appeared on every Buddhist holy night. She claimed to have seen them herself four or five times. Villagers also reported that ducks and chickens often died without explanation.

Somkid's uncle once heard a woman's screams echoing through the village. On that same night, he saw her standing in front of his house, yet Somkid insisted she had never gone there. She believed these eerie events were caused by a Pop, specifically one known as Pop Laek Na. Her belief was reinforced by the fact that her father had once been a shaman.

In mid-May 2026, a case involving alleged Pop drew public attention in Mueang Mukdahan district, Mukdahan province. On May 4, an elderly woman reportedly approached a 66-year-old villager named Duangporn and asked for food. Duangporn kindly shared a meal with her. According to local reports, the following day Duangporn suddenly developed severe abdominal pain and was seen crying out in agony in a video circulated online. She was later taken to hospital, where she died. Doctors reportedly determined that the cause was severe cardiac ischemia, or critically reduced blood flow to the heart. However, many villagers rejected the medical explanation and instead believed that Duangporn had been attacked by a Pop. Rumors quickly spread through the community, fueled by claims that six other villagers had died previously under mysterious circumstances, making Duangporn the seventh alleged victim.

Curiously, suspicion did not focus primarily on the elderly woman who had asked for food. Instead, another elderly woman known as Yai Som (ยายสม, lit. 'The Old Som'), a close acquaintance of Duangporn who suffers from partial paralysis due to hemiplegia, became the target of accusations. Villagers allegedly labeled her a Pop and pressured her to leave the community. Deeply distressed by the accusations, she eventually left her home and sought refuge at a local temple.

=== In academic terms ===
In the technical description, it is described that 'Pop is a social process'. That is to deny people who are alienated from society or the community. The accused is a Pop who will be expelled from the village community. This belief was more prominent in the upper northeast and some central parts. It may not be found in other regions.

=== Adaptations ===
Thai films about Pop include 1989 movie Ban Phi Pop (บ้านผีปอบ), "The House of Pop", 1990 movies Ban Phi Pop 2 (บ้านผีปอบ 2), "The House of Pop 2", Lang Phao Phan Khot Phi Pop (ล้างเผ่าพันธุ์โคตรผีปอบ), "Holocaust of the Ogre Clan", Tanha Phra Chan (ตัณหาพระจันทร์), "Midnight Shade 2", and Pop Phi Hian (ปอบผีเฮี้ยน), "Pop is strong enough", all by Ekapan Banleurit, as well as Phi Lop Pop Mai Lop (ผีหลบปอบไม่หลบ), Phan Phi Pop (พันธุ์ผีปอบ), "The Breed of Pop", and Phi Pop Chom Tingtong (ผีปอบจอมติ๊งต๊อง), "Pop at its Most Crazy". In 2023, Tee Yod, "Death Whisperer" became the fastest Thai film to gross 100 million baht of the year. And its seque, Tee Yod 2, the following year, it became the highest grossing Thai film of the year.

It also appears in movies with a mixture of horror and comedy, such as the 2008 film Ban Phi Poep (บ้านผีเปิบ), "The House of the Spirit Gorging itself", and Krasue Fat Pop Thai: กระสือฟัดปอบ (1990) with Chutima Naiyana, in which Krasue fights against Pop, judged to be a more malevolent spirit than Krasue by the villagers. Most movies about Pop are comedy horrors.

Chao Nang, "The Princess's Terror", 1992 Mae Nak Choe Phi Pop (Mae Nak meets Pop), 1997 Pop Phi Fa and 2009 Pop Phi Fa (remake) are Thai television soap operas (ละคร) based on the Pop legend. This ghost is a popular subject in the same manner as Krasue or Krahang and humorous depictions, as well as gory ones, are common in Thai comics.

== See also ==
- Phi Fa
- Krasue
- Phraya Anuman Rajadhon
- Ghoul
