= Brave Man Standing =

- Thai promotional poster
- Genre: Action; Crime
- Created by: Kartarhut Butpaket
- Written by: Seni Butpaket
- Directed by: Nontanan Sangsawat
- Starring: Nattawut Sakidjai; Woranut Wongsawan
- Opening theme: The Brave Man
- Country of origin: Thailand
- Original language: Thai
- No. of seasons: 2
- No. of episodes: 19

Production
- Running time: approx. 60-70 minutes (per episode)

Original release
- Network: BBTV Channel 7
- Release: 30 June – 1 September 2008

Related
- Brave Man Standing II

Brave Man Standing (Thai: คมแฝก; RTGS: Khom Faek), is a Thai action drama lakorn, loosely based on an older Thai film of the same name. The lakorn became the highest rated lakorn in Thai history. It starred Woranut Wongsawan and Nattawut Sakidjai as the leading couple, and also included Cee Siwat and Cheer with Anuchit and Benz P.

== Summary ==
A group of gangs lead the world into the bloody action of Bangkok, Thailand. The atmosphere of animosity between the bad guys and good guys unlock everyone's experiences of beginning to find the chains within true love, family, and friends.

== Reception ==
Kom Faek got enormous success from viewers. According to AGB Nielsen Media Research, it brought a big hit on screen which received 17 rate in its opening weekend and ended with 25 rate came from 14,916,000 viewers. The Lakorn finally set the record for the highest rated lakorn in history as well as began one of Ch7’s hit makers for the second half of the year. Moreover, Thairath Newspaper Finally reported that the winner for Best Lakorn of 2008 goes to Kom Faek along with Nang Tard and Dao Puen Din for CH 7 winner.

== Cast Years 2008 ==
Characters
Main characters	Played by
Gun Kriengkrai () กัลป์ เกรียงไกร ()	Nattawut Skidjai ณัฐวุฒิ สกิดใจ
Anchan Ratchasri () อัญชัน ราชสีห์ ()	Woranuch Bhirombhakdi วรนุช ภิรมย์ภักดี
San Ratchasri แสน ราชสีห์	Rattapong Tanapat เคลลี่ ธนะพัฒน์
Plerng Gumpanard () เพลิง กัมปนาท / อินทรี เขมราฐ ()	Siwat Chotchaicharin ศิวัฒน์ โชติชัยชรินทร์
Tapao ตะเภา	Thikamporn Ritta-apinan ฑิฆัมพร ฤทธิ์ธาอภินันท์
Ongard Chartnaksoo องอาจ ชาตินักรบ / นายอำเภอองอาจ ชาตินักสู้	Anuchit Sapunpohng อนุชิต สพันธุ์พงษ์
Kraroag Kriangkai กระรอก เกรียงไกร	Punyaporn Pongpipat ปุณยาพร พูลพิพัฒน์
Dok Mai Kriangkai ดอกไม้ เกรียงไกร	Pornrampa Sookdaipung พรรัมภา สุขได้พึ่ง
Second Lieutenant Petch ร้อยตำรวจโท เพชร ไพบูลย์ (รองเพชร)	Giorgio Maiocchi โจโจ้ ไมอ๊อกซิ
Supporting characters	Played by
Malai Kriangkai () แม่มาลัย เกรียงไกร ()	Aranya Namwong อรัญญา นามวงศ์
Jongang () จงอาง ()	Wichaya Jarujinda วิชญะ จารุจินดา
Tapon () ลุงตะโพน ()	Suthep Po-ngam เทพ โพธิ์งาม
Kwan () ขวาน ()	Khaosai Galaxy สุระ แสนคำ
Mae Jaer () แม่แจ้ ()	Ketsarin Poonlarp เกษศริน พูลลาภ
Por Pan () พ่อปาน ()	Kaisri Kaewwimol ไกรสีห์ แก้ววิมล
Singto () สิงโต ()	Witit Lat วิทิต แลต
Kem () เข้ม ()	Bekim Rit เบคิม ฤทธิ์
Saming () สมิง ()	Hammer Somboon แฮมเมอร์ สมบูรณ์
Lieutenant Nit () ร้อยตำรวจตรี นิตย์ จักรสุวรรณ (หมวดนิตย์)	Polkrit Jaksuwan พลกฤษณ์ จักรสุวรรณ
Kanploo () จ่ากานพลู ()	Poo Phothong ปู้ โพธิ์ทอง
Lamduan () ลำดวน ()	Jirawan Inma จิราวรรณ อินมา
Krouk () หมู่กร๊วก ()	Amnuai Injan อำนวย อินทร์จันทร์
Guest characters	Played by
Asanee () อาจารย์อัคนี ()	Sorapong Chatree สรพงศ์ ชาตรี
Son Ratchasee () สน ราชสีห์ (พ่อของแสน)	Darm Dasakorn ดามพ์ ดัสกร
Por Pan () พ่อปาน ()	Porjed Kaenpetch พอเจตน์ แก่นเพชร
Seng Payakphoom () เซ่ง พยัคภูมิ ()	Surawut Maikun สุรวุฑ ไหมกัน
Namjai Chatnaksoo () น้ำใจ ชาตินักสู้ ()	Inthira Ketworasoontorn อินทิรา เกตุวรสุนทร
Wiang Tungkula () เวียง ทุ่งกุลา ()	Krailat Kriengkrai ไกรลาศ เกรียงไกร
Gun Kriengkrai (Young) กัลป์ เกรียงไกร (วัยเด็ก)	Krit Sirisawat ด.ช.กฤต ศิริสวัสดิ์
Anchan Ratchasri (Young) อัญชัน ราชสีห์ (วัยเด็ก)	Supitcha Mongkoljittanon ด.ญ.สุพิชชา มงคลจิตตานนท์
San Ratchasri (Young) แสน ราชสีห์ (วัยเด็ก)	Suttinan Tiansuwan ด.ช.สุทธินันท์ เทียนสุวรรณ

== Cast Years 2018 ==
Characters
Main characters	Played by
Gun Kriengkrai () กัลป์ เกรียงไกร ()	Prin Suparat ปริญ สุภารัตน์
Anchan Ratchasri / () อัญชัน ราชสีห์ / ฤทัย (แม่ของอัญชัน)	Kimberley Anne Woltemas คิมเบอร์ลี แอน เทียมศิริ
San Ratchasri แสน ราชสีห์	Jirayu Thantrakul จิรายุ ตันตระกูล
Plerng Gumpanard () เพลิง กัมปนาท / อินทรี เขมราฐ ()	Alexander Rendell อเล็กซ์ เรนเดลล์
Tapao ตะเภา	Supassara Thanachart สุภัสสรา ธนชาต
Ongard Chartnaksoo องอาจ ชาตินักรบ / ปลัดองอาจ อมรเดช	Sorawit Suboon สรวิชญ์ สุบุญ
Kraroag กระรอก เกรียงไกร	Pattrakorn Tungsupakul ภัทรากร ตั้งศุภกุล
Dok Mai ดอกไม้ เกรียงไกร	Pitchapa Phanthumchinda พิชชาภา พันธุมจินดา
Second Lieutenant Petch ร้อยตำรวจโท เพชร ไพบูลย์ (รองเพชร)	Pongpeera Wiengnon ปวิช เวียงนนท์
Guest characters	Played by
Asanee () อาจารย์อัคนี ()	Wanchana Sawatdee วันชนะ สวัสดี
Son Ratchasee () สน ราชสีห์ (พ่อของแสน)	Anuwat Niwaswong อนุวัฒน์ นิวาตวงศ์
Pracha () ลุงประชา ()	Tanongsak Supakan ทนงศักดิ์ ศุภการ
Gun/Kraroag's dad () พ่อก้าน ()	Sukol Sasijulaka ศุกล ศศิจุลกะ
Supporting characters	Played by
Mae Jaer () แม่แจ้ ()	Arisara Wongchalee อริศรา วงษ์ชาลี
Malai Kriangkai () แม่มาลัย เกรียงไกร ()	Suchada Poonpattanasuk สุชาดา พูนพัฒนสุข
Por Pan () พ่อปาน ()	Gunpol Pridamanoch กัณพล ปรีดามาโนช
Tapon () ลุงตะโพน ()	Donkamol Sattatip ดลกมล ศรัทธาทิพย์
Jongang () จงอาง ()	Chinnapat Kittichaiwarangkul ชินพรรธน์ กิตติชัยวรางค์กูร
Duang Jai () ดวงใจ อมรเดช ()	Pareena Busayasiri ปารีณา บุศยศิริ
Lieutenant Nit () ร้อยตำรวจตรี มานิตย์ วงศ์ดวงดี (หมวดนิตย์)	Surint Karawoot สุรินทร คารวุตม์
Commander James () ผู้การเจมส์ คาร์เตอร์ ()	Peter Tuinstra ปีเตอร์ ธูนสตระ
Kem () เข้ม ()	Ruengrit Wisamol เรืองฤทธิ์ วิสมล
Singto () สิงโต ()	John Bravo จอห์น บราโว่
Kwan () ขวาน ()	Pollapat Welsh พลภัทร เวลส์ช
Krouk () หมู่กร๊วก ()	Hack Chuanchyn แฮ็ค ชวนชื่น
Kanploo () จ่ากานพลู ()	Wasan Padthong วสันต์ พัดทอง
Man () มั่น ()	Suparat Meepreecha ศุภรัตน์ มีปรีชา
Seng Payakphoom () เซ่ง พยัคภูมิ ()	Watcharachai Sunthornsiri วัชรชัย สุนทรศิริ
Chan () ชาญ ()	New OmBo จตุพร วณิชวรพงศ์
Lamduan () ลำดวน ()	ภัทร์พัทธ์ศร วริศราภูริชา
Guest characters	Played by
Peim () เพิ่ม ()	Supoj Pongpancharoen สุพจน์ พงษ์พรรณเจริญ
Mae Daeng () แม่แดง ()	Naruemon Phongsuphap นฤมล พงษ์สุภาพ
() พ่อขององอาจ ()	Paramej Noiam ปรเมศร์ น้อยอ่ำ
Rangsee () รังษี ()	Nirut Saosudchart นิรุติ สาวสุดชาติ
() นักสู้มือไม้คมแฝก ()	Nattapon Mikelly ณัฐภณ มิเกลลี่
Saming () สมิง ()	Visarut Hiranbuth วิศรุต หิรัญบุศย์
Poo Yai Piang () ผู้ใหญ่เพียง ()	Sorawut Charoenchua สรวุฒิ เจริญเชื้อ
Toi () ต๋อย ()	Arethai Klomkik อาไท กลมกิ๊ก
Hia () เฮีย ()	ปัทมะ เปล่งพานิช
() ท่านผู้ว่าฯ ()	เวชสิทธิ์ สุขมาก
Chuang () ช่วงเยี่ยม ()	เยี่ยมพนา ลีลาภิรมย์
() จ่า (ตำรวจ)	กานต์ พงษ์เหนือ
() จ่า (ตำรวจ)	พากเพียร บำรุงพงษ์
() จ่า (ตำรวจ)	กรัณย์ ลิมปรัตนคีรี
Gun Kriengkrai (Young) กัลป์ เกรียงไกร (วัยเด็ก)	Nattapat Nimjirawat ด.ช.ณัฐพัชร์ นิมจิรวัฒน์
Anchan Ratchasri (Young) อัญชัน ราชสีห์ (วัยเด็ก)	Napattanan Nimjirawat ด.ญ.นภัสธนันท์ นิมจิรวัฒน์
Plerng Gumpanard (Young) เพลิง กัมปนาท (วัยเด็ก)	Chancamin Chayangkul ด.ช.ชาญคามิน ชยางกูร
Tapao (Young) ตะเภา (วัยเด็ก)	Chananya Lertwattanamongkol ด.ญ.ชนัญญา เลิศวัฒนามงคล
Ongard (Young) องอาจ (วัยเด็ก)	Pakapon Tanphanich ด.ช.ภคพล ตัณฑ์พาณิชย์
Kraroag (Young) กระรอก (วัยเด็ก)	Zaza Christensen ด.ญ.ซาช่า คริสเตนเซ่น
Duang Jai (Young) ดวงใจ (วัยเด็ก)	Rungrada Runglikitjarearn ด.ญ.รุ่งรดา รุ่งลิขิตเจริญ
() ()	Tantachj Tharinpirom ธรรม์ธัช ธารินทร์ภิรมย์

== Original soundtracks ==
=== 2008 ===
No.	Title	Lyrics	Music	Artist(s)	Length
1.	"Kom Faek" (Thai: คมแฝก)	Mon Dadad	Mon Dadad	Suea Sungnein	3:36
2.	"Ruk Mai Yaum Plien Plang" (Thai: รักไม่ยอมเปลี่ยนแปลง)	Tik Shiro	Apichai Yenpoonsuk	Asanee–Wasan	4:29
3.	"Gaw Koey Sun Yah" (Thai: ก็เคยสัญญา)	Asanee Chotikul	Asanee Chotikul	Asanee–Wasan	4:02
Total length:					12:07

=== 2018 ===
No.	Title	Lyrics	Music	Artist(s)	Length
1.	"Ta Tai" (Thai: ท้าทาย)	Wichian Tantipimolpan	Wichian Tantipimolpan	Ebola	3:34
2.	"Mai Chai Khon Deim" (Thai: ไม่ใช่คนเดิม)	Surachai Phornphimarnman	Apichart Promraksa	Suthita Chanachaisuwan	6:05
3.	"Trab Cheewit Ja Ha Mai" (Thai: ตราบชีวิตจะหาไม่)	Wichian Tantipimolpan	Wichian Tantipimolpan	Supassara Thanachart	4:48
4.	"Trab Cheewit Ja Ha Mai (Acoustic Version)" (Thai: ตราบชีวิตจะหาไม่ (Acoustic Version))	Wichian Tantipimolpan	Wichian Tantipimolpan	Suchart Saeheng	4:18
Total length:					18:45

== Ratings ==
Red color — the number of the highest rating
Blue color — the number of the lowest rating
