= Sapai Look Tung =

- Thai official poster
- สะใภ้ลูกทุ่ง
- Opening theme: "I see your sight at the first time" by Ice Sarunyu Winaipanit
- Country of origin: Thailand
- Original language: Thai
- No. of episodes: 15

Production
- Running time: approx. 60-70 minutes (per episode)

Original release
- Network: Channel 3
- Release: 18 September – 12 November 2008

Related
- Jai Rao

Sapai Look Tung (Thai: สะใภ้ลูกทุ่ง; RTGS: Sa-phai Luk Thung; "Country Daughter-in-law") is a Thai Romance Comedy Lakorn, produced by Channel 3, a famous Thai television channel. The lakorn starring by Mart Krissada and Janie Tienposuwan as the leading roles as well as Notable supporting cast includes: Ace Worrarit Waijeiranai, Vicky Sunisa Jett, and "Job" Nithi Samutkojorn.

== Summary ==
It begins with Artee, being on a date with one of his women, and on his way to the restroom, he sees Mui in the women's restroom. He's so captivated by her beauty that he pretends to bump into her, so that he can get her number. He goes back to his table, while Mui realizes that he has her phone number. So she interrupts his date to expose him for the player that he is. Their paths cross again when Mui's co-worker invites her along on her blind date. The co-worker's blind date turns out to be Artee's friend. When they arrive, Mui's co-worker has left the table, leaving Mui to sit alone. Artee's friend mistakes Mui for his blind date, he has Artee go check her out, and both Mui and Artee are shocked to see each other...Artee insults her while the two friends who are each other's true blind dates meet and insult each other too...so it's all a great mix-up.
