= Unnop Thongborisut =

Thai singer and actor (born 1993)

- Born: 27 September 1993 (age 32); Uttaradit, Thailand
- Occupations: Singer, Actor, MC
- Height: 1.73 m (5 ft 8 in)

Unnop Thongborisut; (born 27 September 1993), simply known as Por (Thai: ปอ), is a Thai singer, actor and the winner of the 7th season of reality talent show True Visions' Academy Fantasia.

== Biography ==
Thongborisut was born in Uttaradit province, Thailand. He has two brothers named Pan and Plam. He graduated from Marie Vithaya School and received a bachelor's degree from the Faculty of Science at Chulalongkorn University. He currently studies at Ramkhamhaeng University, Faculty of Mass Communication.

In 2010, Thongborisut auditioned for the seventh season of True Academy Fantasia. He made it through the final audition round to compete in the show and continued two audition weeks to be one of 12 finalists in the house, then the winner of the season.

In 2021, Thongborisut competed on MasterChef Thailand Celebrity Season 2 and won the show.

In 2022, his father Prasert "Dang" competed on MasterChef Thailand season 5 and ranked in 5th place.

In 2026, his brother Thiti competed on MasterChef Thailand season 7.

== Filmography ==
=== TV Dramas ===
Year	Thai title	Title	Role	Network	Notes	With
2014	บ่วงมาร		True4U	p ชัยลดล		
2014	มนต์เจตภูต		True4U	p วงศ์เมือง เหมือนสิทธิโชค		สรัลธร คล้ายอุดม
2016	มนต์รักสองฝั่งคลอง		PPTVHD36	p ยอด ภักดีไทย		หทัยชนก สวนศรี
2017	ตะวันยอแสง		3HD33	p p		
20			Channel	p p		

=== TV Series ===
Year	Thai title	Title	Role	Network	Notes	With
20			Channel	p p		

=== TV Sitcom ===
Year	Thai title	Title	Role	Network	Notes	With
20			Channel	p p		

=== Film ===
Year	Thai Title	Title	Role	Note	Reference
2015	ฉลุย..แตะขอบฟ้า				
2018	หลวงพี่แจ๊ส 5G				

=== Master of Ceremony: MC ===
==== Television ====
- 2021 : รายการ ชีพจรลงพุง (ผลิตรายการโดย) ทุกวันเสาร์ถึงวันอาทิตย์ เวลา 09.00-09.30 น. On Air Amarin TV (เริ่มวันที่ 2 มกราคม 2564-ปัจจุบัน) ร่วมกับ ลิตา อินท์ชลิตา
- 2021 : รายการ เผ็ดมันส์บันเทิง (ผลิตรายการโดย) ทุกวันจันทร์ถึงวันศุกร์ เวลา 11.10 น. On Air Ch.8 ร่วมกับ Anna TV-Pool, Primrata Dejudom, Napapa Tantrakul, (เริ่มวันจันทร์ที่ 8 มีนาคม พ.ศ. 2564-ปัจจุบัน)
- 2021 : รายการ ไลท์สไตล์ ไทยแลนด์ (ผลิตรายการโดย ห้างหุ้นส่วนจำกัด บ้านไทยลูกทุ่ง) ทุกวันอาทิตย์ เวลา 12.45-13.10 น. On Air 5HD5 (เริ่มวันที่ 23 พฤษภาคม 2564-ปัจจุบัน) ร่วมกับ ท็อป-ศราวุธ พลอยประดับ, มงคล สะอาดบุญญพัฒน์ (นาย The Comedian Thailand), นพดล ดำรง (แน็คกี้ The Comedian Thailand), พีท ธนบดี
- 2021 : รายการ ลูกทุ่งประเทศไทย (ผลิตรายการโดย ห้างหุ้นส่วนจำกัด บ้านไทยลูกทุ่ง) ทุกวันเสาร์ เวลา 14.30-15.30 น. On Air 5HD5 (เริ่มวันที่ 19 มิถุนายน 2564-ปัจจุบัน) ร่วมกับ ท็อป-ศราวุธ พลอยประดับ
- 2022 : รายการ สงครามไมค์ (ผลิตรายการโดย OneSiam Entertainment) ทุกวันอาทิตย์ เวลา 18.00-19.00 น. On Air Ch.9 (เริ่มวันอาทิตย์ที่ 1 พฤศจิกายน พ.ศ. 2565-ปัจจุบัน)

==== Online ====
- 20 : - On Air YouTube:

=== Music video ===
Year	Song title	English Title	Artist	Notes	Ref.
20			S		
20			T		

== Discography ==
=== Songs ===
Year	Song title	English Title	Note	Ref.
20	-		Single	
20	-		Single	

=== OST ===
Year	Drama	English title	Television Drama	Song title	English title
20			Channel	ร่วมกับ	

== Live shows ==
=== Stage play ===
Year	Title	Role	Place	Date	Ref.
20					

=== Concert ===
Year	Title	Place	Date	Ref.
20				
