= Phi Fa =

Tai deity

- Creator God; God of Rain and the Sky; Ruler of Mueang Thaen
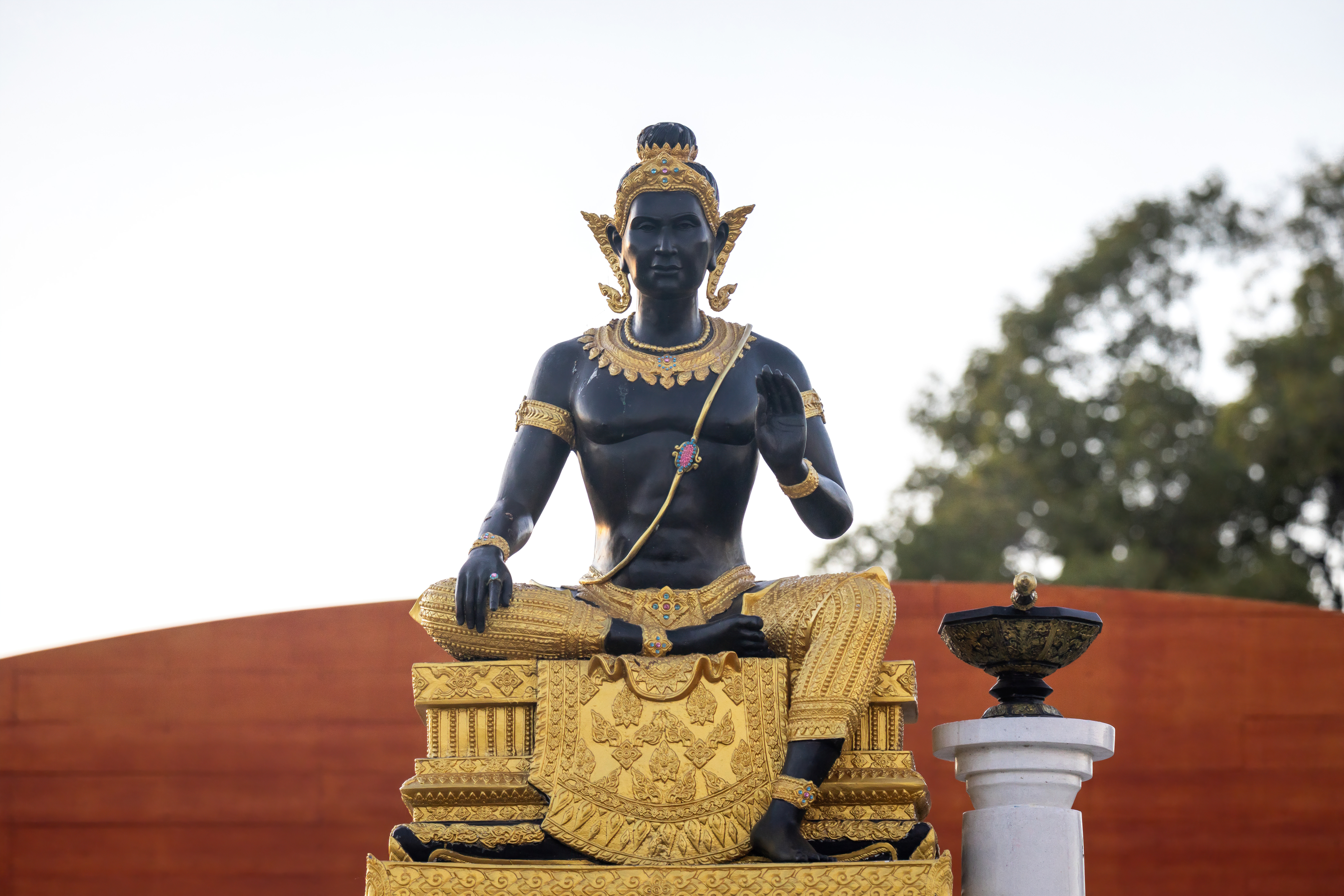
- Statue of Phi Thaen, Yasothon Province, Thailand.
- Other names: Phi Thaen, Phaya Thaen
- Venerated in: Tai folk religion
- Abode: Mueang Thaen
- Symbols: Bronze drum
- Ethnic group: Tai
- Festivals: Rocket Festival; Other

Genealogy
- Children: Khun Borom (Son)

Equivalents
- Hindu: Indra

Phi Fa (Note: Thai: ผีฟ้า [pʰǐː fáː], Lao: ຜີຟ້າ [pʰiː˧˩ faː˧]) or Phi Thaen (Note: Thai: ผีแถน [pʰǐː tʰɛ̌ːn], Lao: ຜີແຖນ) is the god of rain and the sky, the ruler of the heavens, and the creator god in the Tai folk religion. Phi Fa plays a prominent role in Phra Lak Phra Lam and the stories of Khun Borom.

== Name ==
The deity is known as Phi Fa or Phi Thaen or Thien. The Tai word Phi (ผี) refers to a supernatural being which may be a god or a demon, and in this context, a god. Fa (ฟ้า) and Thaen (แถน) both mean sky. While Fa (from *vaːꟲ) has a Proto-Tai root, the word Thaen or Thien is derived from the Chinese word 天 (Tian).

== Phi Fa ritual ==
The Phi Fa ritual is a practice preferably celebrated for a person who recovers after convalescence from a serious disease. The shaman is the medium, that is able to contact Phi Fa and invite her to take part in the ceremony. The shaman selects the suitable date and location for the ceremony, instructs participants during the preparation of the ritual, controls the correct decoration of the sacrificial altar, and conducts the ceremony.

Music, chanting, and dancing are indispensable elements of the Phi Fa ritual. The khaen, a bamboo mouth organ, is the primary musical instrument of the ritual. It is creates a sacred atmosphere accompanying ritual prayers and devotions and encourages dancing around the sacrificial altar. The khaen is accompanied by the phin, a guitar-like stringed instrument, by a drum, and by ching, small bells, cymbals. The chanting is very similar to mor lam, the traditional music of Lao and Thailand.

Phi Fa ritual participants dance around a decorated sacrificial altar. The dance lasts a full night and creates trance conditions for many of the participants. They believe Phi Fa will participate the ceremony and they expect healing and protection from unfavorable fortune.

The steps of the ritual are related to the songs chanted by the shaman and are always accompanied by the khaen. This is because the khaen is believed to be an important mean to communicate with the gods and the spirits. The steps of the ritual are as follows: inviting the gods or spirits, explaining the reason for the invitation, praying for assistance, praying for protection, consoling the patient, re-calling the spirit that has fled the patient, inviting Phi Fa to accept the offerings, Baasii ritual, fortune telling, and taking leave of Phi Fa.

=== The Baasii ritual ===
The baasii ceremony is an important part of Lao culture and few Lao would consider undertaking a long journey or important endeavor without holding one. The faithful sit around a small table on which a variety of offerings are displayed – bananas, sticky rice, biscuits, money, and rice whiskey. An elder or a shaman recites the blessing, while everyone touches the offerings or, if they can't reach, the elbow of someone touching the offerings. The elder or the shaman ties a piece of string around the wrist. In Lao tradition, the soul consists of many guardian spirits that occasionally wander away from their owner. These must be called back and bound to the body to ensure a person is properly protected before any important undertaking. Once the elder has finished other participants continue tying loops of string. Yet more string is produced and finally everyone ties string around each other's wrists, whispering good wishes all the while. It is believed that the string must be worn for at least three full days to ensure the desired effect.

=== Phi Fa dance ===
Lam Phi Fa (Thai: ลำผีฟ้า [lam pʰǐː fáː]; Lao: ລຳຜີຟ້າ) is part of the ritual to propitiate spirits in cases of possession. Musically it derived from Lam Tang Yao; however, it was performed not by trained musicians but by those, most commonly old women, who were thought themselves to have been cured by the ritual.

In his Traditional Music of the Lao, Terry Miller identifies five factors which helped to produce the various genres of lam or dance in Isan: animism, Buddhism, story telling, ritual courtship, and male-female competitive folk music. One of these is Lam Phi Fa, the Phi Fa dance. Lam Phi Fa, together with Lam Phuen is one of the oldest genres.

== Modern adaptations ==
- Jao Nang "The Princess' Terror", Pob Pee Fah and its 2009 remake are Thai television soap operas (ละคร) based on the Phi Fa / Phi Pop legend.
- Tha Rae: The Exorcist, a 2025 supernatural horror film, reveals in its climax that Phi Thaen, referred to in the story by its full title Phi Fa Phaya Thaen (Thai: ผีฟ้าพญาแถน, pronounced [pʰǐː fáː pʰā.jāː tʰɛ̌ːn], Lao: ຜີຟ້າພະຍາແຖນ, lit. 'the sky lord'), is the true demon behind all the possessions throughout the narrative. In the finale, Father Paolo and the yao (the witch doctor) Sopha banish Phi Thaen back to the heavens, combining Catholic exorcism rites with traditional Isan rituals.

== Videos ==
- http://commons.wikimedia.org/wiki/File:Phi_Faa_Shamanistic_Healing_Ritual_NE-Thailand-Laos.ogg
- http://commons.wikimedia.org/wiki/File:Phi_Faa_Shamanistic_Ritual_NE-Thailand_&_Laos_-_Preparation_of_the_Ritual.ogg
