= Ekkachai =

Ekkachai or Ekachai (Thai: เอกชัย) is a Thai masculine given name. People with the name include:

- Ekkachai Janthana, runner
- Ekkachai Nophajinda, sports journalist
- Ekkachai Rittipan, footballer
- Ekkachai Sumrei, footballer
- Ekachai Jearakul (born 1987), Thai classical guitarist
- Ekachai Uekrongtham, Thai theatre and film director
