= Woranuch Bhirombhakdi =

Thai actress (born 1980)

- วรนุช ภิรมย์ภักดี
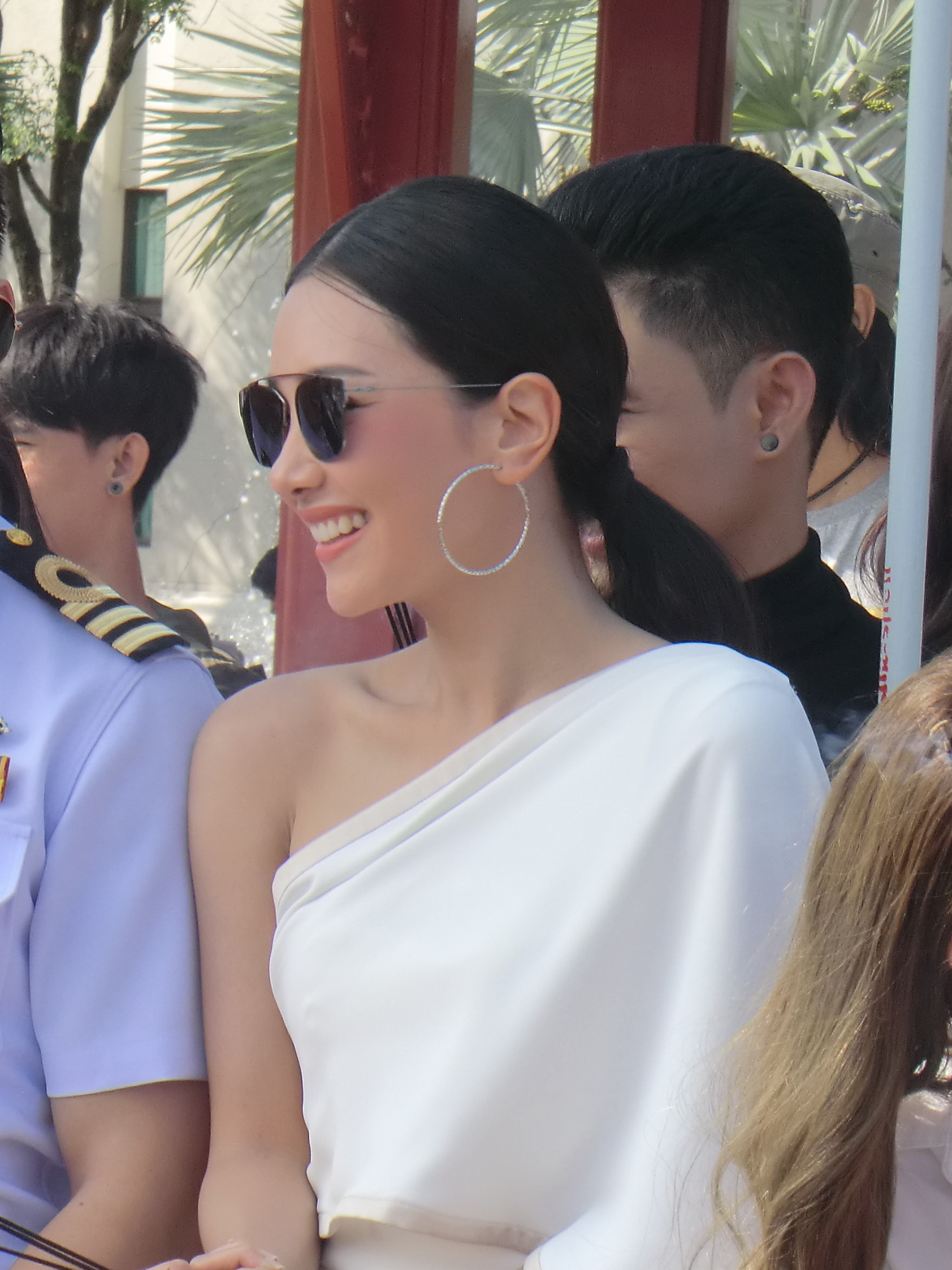
- Woranuch in 2010
- Born: Woranuch Wongsawan; 24 September 1980 (age 45); Nakhon Pathom, Thailand
- Other name: Nune (นุ่น)
- Education: The College of Dramatic Arts; Suan Dusit University
- Occupations: Actress, model, presenter
- Years active: 1997–present
- Spouse: Piti Bhirombhakdi (m. 2010)

Woranuch Bhirombhakdi (Thai: วรนุช ภิรมย์ภักดี; RTGS: Woranut Phiromphakdi), née Wongsawan (Thai: วรนุช วงษ์สวรรค์), or usually known by her nickname Nune (Thai: นุ่น; RTGS: Nun) is a Thai actress in Thai soap operas (lakorn) and films. Her first lakorn role was Pob Pee Fah.

== Early life ==
Woranuch was born on September 24, 1980, and is the third child of 5 siblings. She graduated with a Bachelor of Arts degree from Suan Dusit University.

== Career ==
She made her feature film debut in the 2005 Thai Choem (Thai: เฉิ่ม), or Midnight My Love, directed by Kongdej Jaturanrasamee. She portrayed Nual, a masseuse working in a Bangkok massage parlour, who forms a relationship with downtrodden cab driver, Bati, played by Petchtai Wongkamlao. Nune has received many awards for her roles in lakorns, including the "Top Awards 2004, Best Leading Actress award" for the lakorn Mae Ai Sa-uen. Nune also co-hosts the show Thi Ni Mo Chit.

After her contract with Channel 7 ended in 2012, she became a freelance actress.

== Personal life ==
In May 2010, she married her longtime boyfriend 'Todd' Piti Bhirombhakdi, son of Santi Bhirombhakdi, a Thai business executive. The traditional wedding ceremony and the registration of her marriage was held on May 14, 2010, but the reception was held on May 19, 2010.

In addition to her work in the entertainment industry, Woranuch also has many private businesses, including a dance school, a restaurant, a food supplement, and a condominium business.

== Filmography ==
=== Film ===
Year	Title	Role
2005	Midnight My Love	Nual
2007	The Haunted Drum	Thip
2025	Tomb Watcher	Lunthom

=== Drama ===
Year	Title	Role
1997	Pob Pee Fah	Marnmai / Nonmai
1998	King Pai	Sani
1998	E-Sa	Sopha Panwadee
1999	Sao Noi Roy Maya	Maneemala / Wok
1999	Pitsawat Onlaweng	Baramee / Beam
1999	Nang Gwak	Nang Gwak
1999	Ruk Tem Roy	Nalin
2000	Khae Ueam	Saiparn / Saiban
2000	Rak Nakara	Ming La
2001	Ton Ruk	Pu
2001	No Rah	No Rah
2001	Sed Thee Teen Plao	Nat
2002	Krai Kum Node	Nim
2002	Jom Jone Kon Pa Lok	Manee
2003	Supabaroot Luke Pu Chai	Phraewa Mahachoktangsiri
2003	Pret Wat Satat	San Sanae
2003	Mur Puen Por Luk Tit	Nannapat
2004	Mae Ai Sae Eun	Downel
2004	Pleng Pa Fa Leng Dao	Mai Keaw
2004	Poot Pitsawat	Dao
2005	Ban Roi Dok Mai	Pattalee / Noolee
2005	Fah Krajang Dao	Meethana / Mee
2006	Kan Lum Khong	Wing Kaew
2006	Duay Rang Hang Ruk	Paranee
2006	Likit Hua Jai	Pitaporn / Ploy
2007	Rahut Rissaya	Palai Thaharabodi / Pa
2007	Kasanaka	Wajun
2007	Sadtree Tee Lok Luerm	Ornurin
2008	Pleng Din Klin Dao	Dao La Ong
2008	Dao Puen Din	Eaum Dao
2008	Brave Man Standing	Anchan Ratchasri
2009	Mae Ying	Lady Unalome Rangsee / Ornalom Issara
2009	Rook Kard	Anchan Ratchasri / Piang Fah
2009	Kularb Neua Mek	Oranut
2010	Ngao Hua Jai	Arusa / Anchisa
2011	Kha Khong Khon	Rotjarate / Kluay
2011	Sen Tai Salai Sode	Namfah
2013	Thong Nuea Kao	Lamyong
2013	E-Sa	E-Sa / Usawadee
2015	Puean Rak Puean Risaya	Nangfah
2016	Fang Nam Jarod Fang Fah	Chofah
2016	Pitsawat	Ubon / Sarochinee
2016	We Were Born in the 9th Reign EP. True love	Mookda
2017	Club Friday Celeb's Stories: Usurp	Primar
2017	Ra Raerng Fai	Yada Methasit
2017	Sri Ayodhaya	Jao Fah Sangwan
2019	Ban Saran Land: Seuk Rak Kam Ru	June
2019	Club Friday The Series: Season 11: Ruk Seum Sao	Miao
2019	Plerng Sanaeha	Tian Yodfah
2019	Game Rak Ao Keun	Arisa
2020	Woon Ruk Nakkao	Ornicha Krittikarnkul / Nicha
2020	Prom Pissawat	Herself (Guest Role)
2021	Krachao Seeda	Namping Akkhara
2021	Krachao Seeda Season 2	Namping Akkhara
2022	Trouble Souls	Yaowayod
2023	Loneliness Society	Meena Srinakkharin
2024	Don't Come Home	Varee
