= Suvanant Punnakant =

Thai actress

Suvanant Kongying
- สุวนันท์ คงยิ่ง
- Born: Suvanant Kongying; 28 July 1978 (age 47); Bangkok, Thailand
- Other name: Suvanant Punnakant
- Occupations: Actress; TV Host; model; presenter
- Years active: 1991–present
- Spouse: Danuporn Punnakant (m. 2009)
- Children: 2
- Website: Archived 8 December 2016 at the Wayback Machine

Suvanant Kongying (Thai: สุวนันท์ คงยิ่ง; RTGS: Suwa-nan Khong-ying; born 22 July 1978 in Bangkok) also known by her nickname Kob (Thai: กบ; RTGS: Kop), is a Thai actress. She was the lead actress in many Thai lakorns in the 1990s-2000s. She has appeared in several lakorns (dramas), including Dao pra sook with Sornram Teppitak, in which she played Dao, the main character. She has been voted people's choice winner for top actress for many years. She's considered Thailand's most famous actress and her leading lakorn partner is Sornram Teppitak.

== Early life ==
Suvanant was born in Sirirat Hospital, and lived with her grandmother at Chachoengsao when she was a baby. She moved to Bangkok with her family when she was three to four years old. Her father, Amnuay Kongying (d. November 2001), was a teacher, and her mother, Ubonrat Kongying, works at the ministry of Agriculture and Cooperative. She also has a younger brother named Apisith Golf Kongying. Suvanant began acting from a very young age.

== Career ==
Her first performance in a traditional Thai folklore drama won her widespread popularity and her first major acting award, to which she has since added many. She went on to star in Dao pra sook (Morning Star), in which she played a teenager abandoned as a baby but who grows up to find that she is after all wanted by many people, including the leading male character portrayed by Sornram Theppitak.

She is now married to Danuporn Poonnakan also known as Brook who had been her acting partner.

Suvanant graduated with a bachelor in Communication Arts from Rangsit University. She was paid an undisclosed sum of money – believed to be millions of baht – to act as a presenter for Mistine cosmetics. Suvanant is also a professional ice skating champion.

In 2003 a Cambodian tabloid reported that Suvanant Kongying made a speech claiming that Angkor Wat belonged to Thailand, the allegation which was later found to be groundless. This prompted the 2003 Phnom Penh riots, in which the Thai embassy in Cambodia was destroyed.

Suvanant is also known for co-hosting the famous show Jun pun dao with Nattawut Skidjai.

== Filmography ==
=== Television ===
- Ma Lai Thong (January 1992)
- Yor Pra Klin (June 1992)
- Payong (Pride) (March 1993)
- Kert Tae Tom (Stardust) (October 1993)
- Dao Pra Sook ( Morning Star) (May 1994)
- Daotamdin (Star Destiny) (January 1995)
- Oh....Mada (Oh...Mother) (May 1995)
- Sai Lohit (Bloodline) (November 1995)
- Dokeaw (March 1996)
- Duai Rang Athitarn (Power of a Prayer) (August 1996)
- Thatdaw Busaya (March 1997)
- Twan Tor Sang (Glorious Sunshine) (September 1997)
- Luk Tarn Loy Keaw (Palm Seeds in Syrup) (April 1998)
- Swan Biang(Bent Heaven) (October 1998)
- Kam See Than Dorn (Crossing the Ocean) (June 1999)
- Tung Kai Lom..Prom Mai Li-kit (The Egg Destiny) (August 1999)
- Man Bang Jai (Hearts in Veil) (March 2000)
- Luk-mai.... Klai Ton (Fruit Far from the Tree) (August 2000)
- Dung Swansab(Like Heaven's Curse) (March 2001)
- Ngojai (Reflection of Love/Shadow of the Heart) (August 2001)
- Katakornkammathep (Murder by Cupid) (March 2002)
- Mekla (August 2002)
- Mae Khun Eai (Oh, my Fair Lady) (March 2003)
- Khunjeaw Kraopao kai, Khun chai Kai-dao (Sassy Maid and The Prince) (November 2003)
- Rak Kern Pikad Kan (Love Beyond Revenge) (February 2004)
- Duan Duard (Dark Angel/Furious Moon) (April 2004)
- Khun Poh Rub-Jang (Daddy for Hire) (September 2004)
- Mon Ruk Luktung (Music from the Love Fields) (January 2005)
- Sapai Tornado (The Storming Daughter-in-law) (August 2005)
- Lhong Ngao Jun (Enchanted Moon) (February 2006)
- Duang Jai Patiharn(Miracle of the Heart) (July 2006)
- Kol Ruk Game Payabath (Tricky Love Game of Vengeance) (October 2006)
- Pu Soom Fao Sup(The Treasure Guardians) (March 2007)
- Budsaba Rei Ruk (Lady Inviting Love) (October 2007)
- Saai Yai Sawad (Passionate Bond) (January 2008)
- Nang Tard (The Slave) (March 2008)
- Silamanee (The Precious Stone) (November 2008)
- Reun Sawn Ruk (House of Hidden Love) (April 2010)
- Nam Soh Sai (Whisper Of The Sea) (April 2017)

==== Mini series ====
- Sawan Babb
- Ru Tau Mua Ja Tai (minor Role)
- Ratree Phirap
- Chomrom Tor Tarn Puying
- Ma Mia
- Hom Klin Kwam Ruk
- Duchanee Nang
- Phan Nung Ratree
- Siam Manusti
- Majurat Ting-Tong (guest)
- Ngern Ngern Ngern (guest)
- Ru Fa Yang Fa Yu
- Thong Lang Pra
- Mae Pra Thorranee
- Kum Mun Sunya

=== Films ===
- Numtaohoo & Kru rabearb
- Song Jabb Nung jeed
- Kongroi Ha Soon Nung : Tung Jai ja tak, tae mai tak theaw
- Mai tee, Poo Kan and Soi tee
- Budsabaa Suay Prieow Gap Song Kieow Gling
- Ee Som Som Whang
- Ee Som Som Whang 2

=== Music ===
- Kae Ruk Gor Por (Dao Pra Suk Original Soundtrack)
- Waan Fah Sai (Mistine Commercial Soundtrack)
- Mon Ruk Luktung Original Soundtrack

=== Commercials ===
- Mistine Commercial

=== Television shows (Host) ===
- Jhan Phun Dao
- 07 Show
- Suek Song Baan
