= Silamanee =

- Thai official poster
- Genre: Costume Drama
- Created by: Workpoint Entertainment
- Opening theme: " Princess Searng Fang and Silamannee "
- Country of origin: Thailand
- No. of episodes: 17 (list of episodes)

Production
- Running time: approx. 60–70 minutes (per episode)

Original release
- Network: BBTV Channel 7
- Release: 8 November – 19 December 2008

Related
- Montra Haeng Ruk

Silamanee (Thai: ศิลามณี; RTGS: Sila Mani; "Quartz") is a Thai costume soap drama (known in Thai as a lakhon thorathat, lakhon or lakorn) with the byline: "The love test of a royal princess and a proud man". The show is a remake of a 1994 drama of the same name that was originally based on a novel. Silamanee features Suvanant Kongying and Paul Pattarapon in the main roles.

== Plot outline ==
In the Republic of Chaingrath, located in northern Thailand, a little princess named "Seangfarng" is abandoned by her mother amid an argument over the princess' nationality. Seangfarng is then placed in the care of her father The King of Chaingrath and she later leaves Chaingrath for Bangkok to study, as well as to reunite with her mother, who now has a new family—the princess plans to reunite with her mother, even though she had made a commitment to her mother that they would not meet again.

Ten years later, Seangfarng, the beauty of Chaingrath, transforms herself into beautiful high school girl Ngam Sanluang to hide her real identity from her mother, who is now searching for her. Also, the death of the princess' father provided her with an insight into the "Silamanee", Chaingrath's most precious object (a "Silamanee" is a sacred thing that is traditionally passed down as a marriage gift by the ruler of Chaingrath). The Silamanee has gone missing in Chaingrath due to an arrangement between the king and his closest friend Khun Ruj; however, the Silamanee can be returned to Chaingrath if problems arise in regard to the arrangement—the return of the Silamanee is of the utmost importance to Seangfarng/Ngam and she is provided with the address of the object's location.

The princess then plans to take back the Silamanee, an object that she believes rightfully belongs to her country. With the help of her friend Chalee (the youngest son of Rachasena), who also has a crush on her, Seangfarng/Ngam visits the address where the Silamanee is located. The princess meets a character named "Parote" at the address and she subsequently realizes that Parote is a member of her own family. "Parote" is working in Thai politics, but is also studying, and is the first son of the family. He knows nothing about the princess' true identity, but he directly shows his dislike of the princess towards Seangfarng/Ngam.

Seangfarng/Ngam then disguises herself as a beautiful shopkeeper named Mae Liang and charms Parote when he arrives in her shop for silk that has been sourced from Chiang Rai. The new disguise is part of the princess' second plan to assume three identities to successfully deceive Parote. However, Seangfarng/Ngam's plan to deceive Parote flounders and it not only becomes apparent that he is actually in love with the princess, but that he also knows the true location of the Silamanee. It also becomes clear that Parote already knew the princess' real identity and that he previously wished to marry Seangfarng/Ngam; however, both characters are already engaged to other people.

With the help of friends and family, Parote and Seangfarng/Ngam eventually marry in Chaingrath; however, the new couple relocate to Bangkok due to problems in the princess' home republic. The soap opera then concludes with the return of the Silamanee to Chaingrath, where Seangfarng/Ngam and Parote have returned to assume the roles of King and Queen of Chaingrath.

== Reception ==
Silamanee received positive reviews and it became popular with Thai viewers after the first episode. In its second week, the lakorn received an 11–12 rating from millions of viewers and was ranked number #2—behind another well-established lakorn—in Thailand for that week. Silamanee received a rating of 16 for its final episode and was ranked #1 in Thailand for one day. The show also became the only lakorn to be accompanied by English subtitles. Silamanee was also popular in Cambodia and VCD copies of the first two episodes sold out within one morning; plans were made to release the lakorn in the United States on DVD and VCD.

== Characters ==
- Suvanant Kongying (Kob) as "Princess Saengfarng/Ngam Saenluang/Mae Liang"—the princess of Chiangrath: the only daughter of King Saenluang, the character is sweet and beautiful in the traditional Lanna style; she also possesses a splendid gracefulness, pride and intelligence. However, she is ultimately lonely and seeks the love from her mother that she never received. It is the character's duty to take care of the Chiangrath Province and to return the Silamanee gem stone back to its home. The character transforms herself into an alias, "Ngam Saenluang" (a Political Science student whose background is unknown), to regain the gem stone, while the young, beautiful "Mae Liang" is another alias of the character. The princess' also seeks to prove her dignity and love to the man who she is betrothed to and this becomes her most difficult task.
- Pattarapon Sinlapajan (Paul) as "Parote Rachasena": a good-looking man who has everything, including an old "blue-blooded" (hi-so) family—his father is a general and holds a diploma in the discipline of diplomatic. The character works in the Foreign Affairs Commission that operates across different countries. He has a friendly personality, is outgoing and is charming. The character is also intelligent, possesses leadership skills and cherishes his siblings dearly. The character of Princess Saengfarng tests Parote in many ways without the latter character's awareness of the testing that occurs.
- Pulpat Attapanyapol as "Chalee Rachasena": the younger brother of Parote, the character is a young artist who is also studying art. Chalee is very moody, but worships and praises love beyond anything else. Chalee is strictly opposed to the notion of condescension; although he comes from a rich family, the character appreciates an ordinary lifestyle and lives his life differently from Parote. Chalee falls in love with Ngam at first sight and immediately knows that Ngam is more complex than she initially appears.
- Premsinee Rattanasopha (Cream) as "Sasi Buranayothin": the precious daughter of General Jomnarong and the stepdaughter of Madam Athiti, the character is radiant, cheerful and optimistic. Sasi prioritises love in her life.
- Noppol Pitaklopanich (Glom) as "Jao Saibordee": the character is Princess Saengfarng's male cousin and is a native of Chiangrath. The character is good looking, nice and friendly, and, as a member of the royal family, his manners are proper. Jao loves Princess Saengfarng, but he can only be an older brother to her as they are closely related. Jao is aware of how Saengfarng feels and who she actually loves, and points out to the princess that she needs to decrease her pride to connect with the truth of her heart.
- Jaturawit Kochanuam (Uthen) as "Lieutenant Colonel Atisak": a young soldier with a promising future, the character is fun and amusing. Atisak is Parote's friend and is also associated with the princess' alias Mae Liang. Atisak is responsible for convincing Parote to meet with Mae Liang.
- Sompope Benjatikul as "King Saenluang Na Chiangrath": the Great King of Chaingrath is the perfect father of Princess Searngfarng who raised his daughter alone without the support of his wife. The character finally dies of old age and leaves his daughter with a letter about the Silamanee.
- Papassara Teychapaiboon as "Madam Athiti Buranayothin": the wife of General Jomnarong Buranayothin and the mother of Searngfarng; the character initially abandoned her daughter but then attempts to reconnect with the princess. After a long period of resentment, the princess eventually re-unites with Madam Athiti Buranayothin lovingly.
- Thapakorn Dissayanant as "General Jomnarong Buranayothin"
- Pairoj Jaisingh as "Praya Petcharayoot Rachasena/Luang Rathchanurak"
- Sitiporn Niyom as "Prince Gawin of Rathshaan"
- Apiradee Pawaputanont as "Madam Samerjai Rachasena"

== Casting ==
During the pre-production period for the lakorn, a number of actresses were considered for the role of Searngfang. The 2004 Thailand Supermodel Contest winner Pancake Khemanit Jamikorn, Ann Thongprasom, Pachrapa Chaichua and Woranut Wongsawan were all considered, but Suvanant Kongying was eventually cast as Searngfang (Jamikorn was actually offered the role but declined). Jamikorn was considered for a minor role on the show following a suggestion from the director, but the idea was never enacted.

== Silamanee (jewellery) ==
The Silamanee in the remake is stylistically different from the gem stone in the original version. The necklace in the original version contains a large bold circle with three dangling droplet-shaped emeralds, while the stone in the remake consists of five dangling emeralds—two rectangular, two square-shaped and one droplet-shaped. Both versions are green in appearance.

With the director's approval, a famous Thai jeweller Kun Chuchai designed the necklace with a Victorian influence. The Silamanee is worth over 100 million baht (approximately USD3.4 million) and once belonged to the Romanov family, the last royal bloodline of Russia.

== Chaingrath ==
Chaingrath is a fictional location that was created for the purpose of the lakorn. However, the culture and tradition that appears on Silamanee was based on the city of Chiang Mai; for example, the celebration of the Loy Krathong festival is used as the inspiration for one of the show's scenes. Chiang Mai is the largest and most culturally significant city in northern Thailand. The concept of Chaingrath was also influenced by Lanna, an ancient kingdom that was located in the area around Chiang Mai.

== Trivia ==
- Apiradee Pawaputanont return to the cast of the remake—as Madam Samerjai Rachasena—after appearing in the original version.
- While filming the Chaingrath scenes, the actors and actresses preferred the traditional costumes that were similar to the traditional clothing of Burma.

== Award nominations ==
=== Top Award 2008 ===
- "Top Drama"
- "Top Actress (lakorn)"
- "Best Director"
- "Best Rising Star Actor (lakorn)"

=== Nine Entertain Awards 2009 ===
- "Best Actress of the Year"
