= Nang Tard =

- Thai official poster
- Based on: นางทาษ by วรรณสิริ (Wannasiri)
- Opening theme: "Tard Guam"
- Country of origin: Thailand
- No. of episodes: 19

Production
- Running time: approx. 90 minutes (per episode)

Original release
- Network: BBTV Channel 7
- Release: 10 March – 12 May 2008

Nang Tard (Thai: นางทาส, RTGS: Nang That, IPA: [naːŋ tʰâːt], means The Slave Girl but its international title is The Slave) is a Thai period drama lakorn based on the same name novella of Wannasiri, remade from a 1993 lakorn of the same name. The lakorn stars Suvanant Kongying and Vee Veerapat in the main roles with several talented actresses such as Pok Piyatida in the role of Khun Ying Yaem and May Bunthita as Boonmee. The story is set in a time when slavery was legal in Thailand.

== Summary ==
A poor girl, Yen, was sold to Khun Ying (by her father who had gambling debts) into one of the richest families in the province. Fortunately, Yen became Khun Ying Yam's slave but to Khun Ying Yam she was more than that. When Salee, the second wife heard about Yen, she was furious because Yen is beautiful and young. But because she was pretty and young, the handsome landowner Praya Sihayotin began to develop feelings for Yen. This made Salee very jealous and wrathful. Praya Sihayotin had three wives who could not give him a child. One day Praya Sihayotin asked Ying Yaem if he can take Yen to be his fourth wife. Ying Yaem agreed and Yen became Praya Sihayotin's fourth wife.

Yen didn't want to marry Praya Sihayotin because she only thought of herself as a slave and was scared, too. After having Khun Ying Yaem and Fah talk to her she agreed to marry Praya Sihayotin. Shortly after the marriage, Yen became pregnant with Praya Sihayotin first child. When Fah told Ying Yaem that Yen was pregnant, Ying Yaem was excited and couldn't wait to tell Praya Sihayotin. When Salee heard that Yen was pregnant, she tried to make Yen have a miscarriage (because she couldn't get pregnant). When Praya came home, Salee tried to convince him to sleep with her that night. Little did she know that when he went into Ying Yaem house he would not visit her that night. Ying Yaem told Praya that Yen is pregnant and in her room. Praya was so speechless he went to Yen's house with a smile on his face with excitement.

Two months later, Ying Yaem became pregnant which made Praya even happier because now he had two children on the way. As time went by, Salee tried over and over again to kill Yen's child but with no success. Ying Yaem and Yen gave birth. Praya had told both of them that he is leaving for work in another city and will not be present at Yen's delivery but will probably be at Ying Yaem's. After he left, Yen and Ying Yaem went into labor at the same time, but Ying Yaem was a little early. Ying Yaem gave birth to a stillborn son while Yen gave birth to a strong, healthy baby girl. With everyone devastated that Ying Yaem's baby did not survive, Fah had asked Yen if she was willing to give her baby to Ying Yam. Heartbroken Yen gave up her baby and asked to keep this secret from Praya.

The secret was well hidden only between the people who present at the births. When Praya returned home, he went straight to Yen's house to see her and the baby. Yen tells Praya that she gave birth to a boy but he had died right after birth. With Praya saddened by the news he tells her that it is OK and there is still plenty of time to have another. He then leaves to go to Ying Yaem to find her holding their baby girl. Praya is still happy even though Ying Yaem "had" a baby girl. Yen was very sad that she could not enter Ying Yaem's house, but later on Ying Yaem told Yen that if she ever wanted to hold the baby or just to see her then just come to the house. This made Yen very happy.

As time went by bad things started happening to Yen. Accused of committing adultery by Boonmee, Praya was heartbroke. That made him strip Yen's status back to a slave and to never to come near Khun Ying Yaem's house to see the child again. Over the years Yen dealt with the pain of being tortured by her husband, Boonmee, and the worst from Salee.

Ten years later, Yen's daughter grew up unaware of her birth mother's identity. She was a little spoiled, but very kind, and fell in love with a young man in her house: Tun. She soon found he was in love with a slave girl, La Orn, who worked alongside Yen. This was a family problem as La Orn was about to become another wife for Praya Sihayotin, but she befriended Tun. To make their dream come true, Praya Sihayotin married them and took another girl named Chan, just to take care of his wife. One night Salee lured Nu Dang out to meet a guy who was supposedly to hurt her. Yen heard what was going to happen and tells her not to go. But, being a brat, she slaps Yen and runs back to the house. Not saying anything because she was still shaking, Yen was accused by Salee of trying to hurt Nu Dang. Yen was to be whipped as a punishment, which Praya later regrets, while Salee smiles on. Nu Dang finally tells her father that Yen was not trying to hurt her; she was trying to stop her from meeting a guy that Salee had set up. Furious at Salee, he goes to her house and whips her until she passes out. She is later stripped from her status and forced to leave the property. Feeling bad, Nu Dang ask her mom to see Yen and to apologize to Yen. Yen was shocked to see Nu Dang at her place. Nu Dang apologizes to Yen. Yen tells her that it is OK and she is not mad at her at all.

Later on, Yen's older brother Yuen comes back with their mother to buy Yen back. When Fah saw him she asked Yen's mother who was that man. She finally told Fah that the man was Yen older brother. After hearing this, Fah takes them to go see Praya and to tell him the truth. With what they have to tell Praya, will it set Yen free from the pain she endured?

== Cast ==
- Veraparb Suparbpaiboon as Praya Sihayotin
- Suvanant Kongying as Yen
- Piyatida Woramoosik as Khun Ying Yam
- Jiranan Manojam as Salee
- Buntita Tanwiset as Boonmee
- Sarawut Maikhun as Kloy
- Mananya Triyanon as Jun-In
- Chanapol Sataya as Olarn / Tab
- Tunsinee Promsut as La-Or
- Thanchanok Ritnakha as Noo Daeng
- Duangdao Jarujinda as Fuk
- Orasa Isarangkul as Grandma Bai
- Rachaya Rakkasikorn as Khun Ying Yim
- Prab Yuttapichai as Praya Apaironarit (Khun Ying Yim's husband)
- Chalermporn Pumpanwong as Ying (Yen's father)
- Panatda Komaratat as Luan (Yen's mother)
- Surawut Maikun as Kloi (Salee's relative)
- Jarusiri Phuwanai
- Podjanee Yailaor as Aeb
- Khets Thunthup

== Reception ==
Nang Tard received a positive response from the viewers, although ratings weren’t as high as expected for this remake, because it was not like the original. However, it garnered enough to have an overall average rating of 12, estimated around 7,565,000 viewers.

It was almost considered the highest rated for a remake lakorn but was pushed out by Suvanant Kongying's Silamanee, which was a huge hit with viewers as it just came out for one episode.

== Awards ==
Like the rate, the film was a success in several drama celebrations. In SiamDara Star Party 2008, Nang Tard received two awards out of four nominations including Best Actor and Best Actress by Suvanant Kongying. It won the best drama award and the Best Antagonist for Yui Jiranan for being nasty for Salee character. The lakorn was also nominated for Asian Television Awards in Best Drama Performance by an Actress with Pok Piyatida and Yui Jiranan as the nominees. Fortunately, Yui Jiranan won the award for the lakorn at the celebration in Singapore on December 11, 2008.

== Awards and nominations ==
Award	Category	Recipients and nominees	Outcome
Siamdara Star Party 2008	Best Steal the scene	Naridsara Pormsupa	Nominated
Siamdara Star Party 2008	Best Villain	Jiranan Manojaem	Won
Siamdara Star Party 2008	Best Leading Actor	Veeraparb Soopappaiboon	Nominated
Siamdara Star Party 2008	Best Leading Actress	Suvanant Kongying	Nominated
Siamdara Star Party 2008	Favorite Drama	Nang Tard	Won
Asian Television Awards 2008	Best Drama Performance by an Actress	Jiranan Manojaem	Won
Asian Television Awards 2008	Best Drama Performance by an Actress	Piyatida Woramoosik	Nominated
6th Kom Chad Luek Awards	Best Leading Actress	Jiranan Manojaem	Nominated
6th Kom Chad Luek Awards	Best Leading Actress	Piyatida Woramoosik	Nominated
Top Awards 2008	Best Rising Actor	Chanapol Suttaya	Won
Top Awards 2008	Best Supporting Actress	Jiranan Manojaem	Won
Top Awards 2008	Best Director	Siam Sangwaribud	Nominated
Top Awards 2008	Best Drama	Nang Tard	Nominated
Nine Entertain Awards 2009	Best Actress of the Year	Suvanant Kongying	Nominated
Nine Entertain Awards 2009	Best Drama of the Year	Nang Tard	Nominated
23rd Golden Television Awards	Outstanding Original Song	Tard Guam	Nominated
23rd Golden Television Awards	Outstanding Art Direction	Nang Tard	Nominated
23rd Golden Television Awards	Outstanding Writing for a Drama	Pawit	Nominated
23rd Golden Television Awards	Outstanding Supporting Actress	Jiranan Manojaem	Nominated
23rd Golden Television Awards	Outstanding Directing for a Drama	Siam Sangwaribud / Sitthiwad Tabpaen	Nominated
23rd Golden Television Awards	Outstanding Drama	Nang Tard	Nominated
6th Hamburger Awards	Best Supporting Actress	Jiranan Manojaem	Nominated
6th Hamburger Awards	Best Supporting Actress	Piyatida Woramusik	Nominated
6th Hamburger Awards	Best Drama	Nang Tard	Nominated
Star Entertainment Awards 2008	Best Supporting Actress	Jiranan Manojaem	Won
Star Entertainment Awards 2008	Best Leading Actress	Suvanant Kongying	Nominated
Star Entertainment Awards 2008	Best Leading Actor	Veeraparb Soopappaiboon	Nominated
Star Entertainment Awards 2008	Best Drama	Nang Tard	Nominated
TV inside Hot Awards 2009	Best Hot Villain of the Year	Jiranan Manojaem	Won
TV inside Hot Awards 2009	Best Hot Drama of the Year	Nang Tard	Nominated

== Related Productions ==
Nang Tard is a novella included in the short story collection of Wannasiri titled Sroi Nopkao, first published in 1951. After the publishing, there are many adaptations of the novella including 2 films and 4 television series.

=== 1955 film ===
The first adaptation was titled นางทาษ which is now the obsolete spelling. The film directed and screenplay by Anusorn Mongkolkarn, shot using 16 mm film and premiered on March 18, 1955, at the Empire Theatre near Pak Khlong Talat, featuring live voice-over dubbing during the screening.

Casts

- Wilaiwan Wattanapanich as Yen
- Sathaporn Mukdaprakorn as Praya Sihayotin
- Kamjai Ratanadilok as Khun Ying Yam
- Suphan Buranaphim as Salee

=== 1962 film ===
The second film adaptation was titled นางทาษ like the first film. The film also directed and screenplay by Anusorn Mongkolkarn the same but shot using 35 mm film.

There were some actors from the first film who return to perform in this adaptation.

Casts

- Wilaiwan Wattanapanich as Yen
- M.R.Prasitsak Singhara as Praya Sihayotin
- Kamjai Ratanadilok as Khun Ying Yam
- Suphan Buranaphim as Salee
- Adul Dulyarat as Olarn / Tab
- Orasa Isarangul na Ayutthaya as Oonruen or Noo Daeng

=== 1981 television series ===
The first television series based on Wannasiri's novella was titled นางทาส and released in 1981. This adaptation was the third time for Anusorn Mongkolkarn to do screenplay. The television was directed by Adul Dulyarat who was played Olarn / Tab in 1962 film, and produced by Tarika Tidatit.

The series aired on Channel 3 every Monday to Friday at 9:50 PM.

Casts

- Ratchanoo Boonchuduang as Yen
- Adul Dulyarat as Praya Sihayotin
- Nantawan Mekyai as Khun Ying Linjee
- Duangdao Jarujinda as Salee
- Dilok Thongwattana as Olarn / Tab
- Niphaporn Nongnuch as Oonruen / Noo Daeng
- Juree Ohsiri as Fuk
