= Pob Pee Fah =

- Opening sequence
- Opening theme: "Pee Nang Fah"
- Country of origin: Thailand
- No. of seasons: 1
- No. of episodes: 14

Production
- Running time: approx. 50 minutes (per episode)

Original release
- Network: BBTV Channel 7
- Release: 1997

Pob Pee Fah (Thai: ปอบผีฟ้า; RTGS: Pop Phi Fa) is a Thai ghost story, made as a TV series (known as a lakorn, the Thai equivalent of a soap opera). Set partly in the 19th century, it shares some plot details with an earlier series, Jao Nang, which aired in 1990, and on which some observers believe it was based.

Pob Pee Fah was considered by many to be one of the scariest of Thai lakorns, and actress Woranut Wongsawan, appearing in her first lakorn, claimed in a later interview that a real Pee Fah (a type of Thai ghost) appeared during the shooting of one of the scenes.

== The legend ==
The story is based on an old Thai legend of a type of ghost or spirit known as a Pee Fah (Thai: ผีฟ้า), or Phi Pop (Thai: ผีปอบ).

The Pee Fah needs to possess a host in order to live, and only leaves the host's body when the host is asleep. Before the host dies, the Pee Fah must find a new host in which it can reside, and that is achieved by inducing the new victim to consume saliva from the old host. These ghosts are powerful and fearful, and if one succeeds in entering someone, it will possess them for life, feeding on the intestines and blood of human victims.

A Pee Fah can be banished from its host by the performance of a special dance, in which the exorcist moves in whirlpool-like motions. The ghost is drawn out by the whirling effects, and so leaves the host's body.

The original version of the legend tells of a Prince who was a practitioner of magic, and who discovered an incantation that enabled him to enter and possess the bodies of living victims. On one occasion when the prince said the magic words to enter the body of an animal, his servant overheard him, and used the words to enter the vacated body of the Prince.

The Prince, having discovered his servant's action, entered the body of a bird and flew to his wife to seek help. Between them they destroyed the body of the servant. Next, the prince (in the bird's body) challenged the servant (in the prince's body) to enter the body of an animal. When the servant foolishly entered and took control of the animal's body, the real Prince re-entered his own body, leaving the spirit of the servant with no body of his own to return to.

From that day on, the spirit of the servant was condemned to seeking a succession of new hosts.

== Plot summary ==
Pob Pee Fah tells the tale of a princess, how she is originally possessed by a spirit or ghost known as a Pee Fah, or Pee Pob, and how the ghost subsequently takes possession of her descendants, one generation at a time.

=== First Generation ===
In the 19th century, in the northeast of Thailand, Princess Nang Fah leaves her palace with two of her royal servants, to go and live in a rural village. At the time, the area is being haunted by a fearful spirit, the Pee Fah, which, according to legend, possesses its hosts and, using their bodies, feasts on the intestines and blood of its human victims.

The princess was, in fact, the granddaughter of an exorcist who had previously combated the spirit, and she had been practicing the traditional exorcism dance for years as she grew up.

The dance was beautiful, but using it for an exorcism is a dangerous undertaking, and as Nang Fah makes her attempt, the Pee Fah is able to enter her body after she inadvertently takes in some of its saliva, which it has deposited on a nearby green leaf. The spirit has successfully continued its revenge against the princess's family of exorcists.

Possessed, she has become Pee Nang Fah (the ghost Nang Fah), and a new generation of Pee Fah is released to continue its bloody nightly hunts.

=== Second Generation ===
Nang Fah marries a brave man and they have a daughter. But her husband discovers her secret when he catches her about to kill their own daughter for food. He offers to take her place instead, and the daughter is saved. As time passes and as Nang Fah ages, she transfers some of her saliva to her daughter and her daughter is possessed by the Pee Fah, becoming the next Pee Nang Fah.

She becomes the most evil manifestation of them all, by day having the appearance of a normal woman. But when hunting with Nang Fah's royal servant at night, she changes into a beautiful princess with a green face, and pursues travelers who pass during the night. Before she kills them, she dances the whirlpool dance to appear even more dreadful.

=== The Last Generation? ===
The daughter of Nang Fah marries a handsome man and they in turn have a daughter of their own. She is named "Kaew", and is destined to become the next Pee Nang Fah in turn.

When Kaew's father unexpectedly dies from an illness, a young doctor who visits the village hears stories of local people who have mysteriously died or disappeared. He investigates, and discovers that the killer is Kaew's mother, possessed by the Pee Fah. Kaew refuses to believe him when told, being firmly convinced that her mother is just an ordinary old lady.

What will happen to Kaew? Will she stop her mother and end the Pee Nang Fah line, or will she become the next to take up the terrible role?

== The Pob Pee Fah Song and Dance ==
In the opening sequence, the series star Woranut Wongsawan sings and performs a version of the exorcism dance, mixing it with northeastern Thai traditional dancing. Having to dance its subtle movements while wearing traditional dress, Woranut needed to practice for several months before shooting started.

== Remake ==
A remake of Pob Pee Fah in the form of a new lakorn was announced in 2009, with the award winning actress Chiranan Manochaem in the role of Pee Nang Fah.

== Pee Fah appearances in Thailand ==
In 2007, following the mysterious deaths of four villagers in the Sam Chai district of the northeastern Thai province of Kalasin, 1,000 residents, fearing the cause to be evil spirits, raised 35,000 baht to pay for the exorcism of a Pee Fah, believed to be possessing two of the female villagers.
