= Thep Sarm Rudoo =

- Opening theme: " Thep Sarm rudoo "
- Country of origin: Thailand
- No. of episodes: 50

Production
- Running time: approx. 40-45 minutes (per episode)

Original release
- Network: BBTV Channel 7
- Release: 2005 – 2005

Thep Sarm Rudoo (Thai: เทพสามฤดู; RTGS: Thep Sam Ruedu) is a 2005 Thai lakorn boran (Classic Play) based on Thai folklore. It has been remade several times. This Thai television soap opera became one of the most popular in Thailand at 2005. The plot is about a child of a king who can turn into three incarnations each season such as turning into a man for rainy season, a woman for cold season and a giant for dry season.
