= Midnight My Love =

- The Thai movie poster.
- Directed by: Kongdej Jaturanrasamee
- Written by: Kongdej Jaturanrasamee
- Produced by: Prachya Pinkaew; Siwaporn Pongsuwan; Sukanya Vongsthapat
- Starring: Petchtai Wongkamlao; Woranut Wongsawan
- Cinematography: Sayombhu Mukdeeprom
- Edited by: Lee Chatametikool
- Music by: Chaibundit Peuchponsub
- Distributed by: Sahamongkol Film International
- Release date: 12 May 2005
- Running time: 100 minutes
- Country: Thailand
- Language: Thai

Midnight My Love (Thai: เฉิ่ม or Cherm, literally "old-fashioned person") is a 2005 Thai romantic drama film written and directed by Kongdej Jaturanrasamee and starring Petchtai Wongkamlao and Woranut Wongsawan.

The film features a change of pace for comic actor Petchtai, who offers a sombre, dramatic portrayal of a taxicab driver who develops a relationship with a young woman (Woranut, in her debut feature film role) who is working in a massage parlor.

The film has dream sequences that place the characters in scenes that might have come from a classic Thai melodrama film of the 1960s or 70s, with a dubbed soundtrack, which was a common method of filmmaking in the era.

== Plot ==
Sombat is a taxi driver in Bangkok who spends much of time listening to Thai pop ballads and radio soap operas on his favorite AM radio station. He selective about the passengers he accepts, some of whom complain about his preferences for older music. His co-workers occasionally make fun of his traditional habits, including his decision not to own a mobile phone

He follows a routine that has him driving the cab by night and sleeping by day in his small apartment. He eats at the same food stall and orders the same meal each day. Sometimes he'll visit a ballroom where big band music is played and there is dancing, but he always sits by himself and sips a Coke. He also writes letters to his radio station, hoping one night he'll hear his letter read on air.

For part of his evenings at work, he parks his cab in a queue outside a massage parlor. One night he picks up four "masseuses" as they are getting off work. Three of them tease him for listening to the old radio station, but the fourth, Nual, sits quietly, which catches Sombat's attention. The next night, Nual rides with Sombat again. She becomes a regular fare and the pair begin a friendship.

The homely, middle-aged Sombat thinks he and the beautiful, young Nual are actually a lot alike. In one of his letters to the radio station, he writes about the relationship and points out that he takes people to their destinations, but he never gets anywhere himself. And Nual, in her job, takes men to their destinations, but never to where she needs to be. She's stuck there, working to send money home to her family in the rural provinces.

Nual is being pushed by her pimp to become the mistress for a gangster, but Sombat remains a loyal friend and continues to ferry her home each night. The story starts to take a strange turn when Sombat is held by the police for questioning, and he misses his appointment pick-up time with Nual. Sombat has a dark past that he's never let on about, and he grows distant from Nual, which pushes her closer to the gangster.

== Cast ==
- Petchtai Wongkamlao as Sombat Diprom
- Woranut Wongsawan as Nual
- Siwa Traesang as Sia Chain
- Keunsith Suwanwattakee as Jon
- Puritat Chaiseth as Toy
- Ratsant Srisiriyaporn as Mooh
- Kiradej Ketkinta as Police Captain

== Festivals and awards ==
The film has appeared several film festivals, including the 2005 Pusan International Film Festival, the World Film Festival of Bangkok and the 2006 Deauville Asian Film Festival (where it won the critic's prize), Chicago International Film Festival and 2006 Karlovy Vary International Film Festival.

It was nominated (but did not win) in several categories for the Thailand National Film Awards, including best actor, best actress, best director, best screenplay and best picture. However, it did win awards from the Bangkok Critics Assembly, including best director, best actress and best script (tied with Dear Dakanda).
