= Dao Pra Sook =

Thai lakorn which has been remade several times

Dao Pra Sook (Thai: ดาวพระศุกร์; RTGS: Dao Phra Suk; literally: Venus) is a Thai lakorn which has been remade several times. The latest of which aired on Thailand's channel 7 in 1994 and was one of the most popular lakorns in the country. It starred Sornram Teppitak as Phak (Thai ภาคย์) and Suvanant Kongying as Daoprasook (Thai ดาว). The plot is about a wealthy man who 'buys' a prostitute from a brothel and later falls in love with her. The shows were regarded by some as the most cliché (น้ำเน่า) soap opera in Thailand.

== Summary ==
A young woman gives birth at dawn to a baby girl, and leaves her daughter as soon as she can. The girl is later named Daoprasook by the nurses because the planet Venus ("daoprasook" in Thai) was visible at the time of her birth. Later, a childless couple adopts Dao. However, as soon as they adopt her, the wife becomes pregnant and gives birth to a daughter. The mother favors her own daughters more than Dao and treats her like a servant behind the father's back. The young Dao is abused by her adoptive mother to the point where she decides to run away. Now on the streets, she uses her wits to survive until a kind-hearted prostitute takes her under her wings.

Years later, Dao is now a beautiful teenager who is forced to work to help the kind prostitute who raised her. Of course, she is too moral to sell her body so she would lead her customers into a darkened room where she would switch another prostitute for herself. She soon gains a certain amount of fame with many men seeking her service.

Khun Phak, a rich businessman meets Daoprasook and somehow makes a deal with the brothel's managing woman. He buys her and forces her to move into his house. What occurred next can be imagined. Phak at first despises Dao for being a prostitute who gave one of his friends an STD. He decides to have her tested. The result puzzles him greatly, as she is perfectly healthy. All this while, Dao is abused by a servant called Maew in Phak's house. Maew's loyalty lies with Mayarasamee, who wants to marry the wealthy Phak. Undaunted, Dao proves herself to Phak to be a lady and endures all verbal abuses directed at her. The only kindness she finds and by which she is comforted is from an elderly man, a businessman like Phak. However, she has secretly fallen in love with Phak and vice versa. Although he has been able to restrain himself from sexually abusing Dao all this time, the news of Dao's relationship with another man angered him. With a drunken rage, he storms into Dao's bedroom and begins to make sexual advances on the young girl. Dao, in a state of shock that Phak, who has been a gentleman in this matter, is trying to abuse her tries to fight back, only later losing because of her feelings to Phak. That night, they consummated their love. The next morning, upon seeing the blood stain on the bedsheet, Phak realizes that he is the first for Dao. She grieves over her lost virginity, because it was something that she has guarded dearly for a long time.

In a twist of fate, the mother of Dao who abandoned her 18 years ago at the hospital meets her at Phak's house and recognizes her first daughter when she sees a heart-shaped scar on Dao's upper chest. She is now married with a young son. Convinced that the businessman (and he is) is in love with Dao, she reveals her secret to him, telling him that their affair produced a child, a daughter: Daoprasook. The truth comes out and changes Dao's status immediately. She is now the daughter of a respected woman and a rich businessman. Still she yearns for love from Phak, who she considers to be her husband. He also happens to be related to her as he is a cousin to Dao's mother, making her his second cousin. As can be expected from a lakorn, Phak reveals his true feelings to Dao and asks her to marry him. The lakorn ends with their lavish wedding.
