= Ekkachai Nophajinda =

Thai journalist (1953–1997)

- Ekkachai Nophajinda reporting in 1994
- Born: June 21, 1953; Phra Nakhon, Bangkok, Thailand
- Died: March 6, 1997 (aged 43); Phaya Thai, Bangkok, Thailand
- Other names: Jackie (Thai: แจ็คกี้); Nid Noi (Thai: นิดหน่อย)
- Education: Senior High School
- Alma mater: Vajiravudh College
- Occupation: Columnist • Journalist • Television personality
- Years active: 1974–1997
- Organization(s): Bangkok Broadcasting & Television Co.Ltd. • Siam sports Co.Ltd.
- Known for: Sport television personality from Channel 7 (Thailand)
- Television: Channel 7 (Thailand)
- Spouse: Yuree Weerasukhon (Thai: ยุรี วีระสุคนธ์)
- Children: 1
- Relatives: Taravut Nophajinda

Ekkachai Nophajinda (Thai: เอกชัย นพจินดา) or pen name Yor Yoeng (Thai: ย.โย่ง) (June 21, 1953 – March 6, 1997) was a famous Thai sport journalist, columnist, television personality from Channel 7 (Thailand) and chairman businesspeople of Siam Sport Syndicate.

== Biography ==
He was born on June 21, 1953, in Bangkok. He was son of Praithoon and Urai Nophajinda, he was a younger-brother as Tarawut Nophajinda.

He worked as a sport journalist and columnist between 1974 and 1997. He married Yuree Weerasukhon in 1986. They had a daughter Taweephorn Nophajinda.

He died of complications of heart failure. while playing tennis with his friends at tennis court inside BBTV’s broadcast center, He feels his chest tight and collapsed, his friends attempted to perform the first aid and rushed him to Paolo Hospital, where he died later. on March 6, 1997, in Bangkok. He was 43.
