= The Comedian Thailand =

Comedy reality television show in Thailand

- Also known as: The Comedian Thailand
- Genre: Comedy
- Created by: Comedy Line co.ltd
- Developed by: Comedy Line co.ltd
- Presented by: Tansita Suwatcharatanakit; Siriporn Yourod (Week 2-12); Bamruea Pongintarakul(Week 1)
- Judges: Jaturong Photaram, Suprawat Pattamasutr
- Voices of: Katrina Grose
- Narrated by: Katrina Grose
- Opening theme: Art Vacation/ Kaneth Paktrakettrin/ Katrina Grose
- Ending theme: Art Vacation/ Kaneth Paktrakettrin/ Katrina Grose
- Composer: Art Vacation/ Kaneth Paktrakettrin/ Katrina Grose
- Country of origin: Thailand
- Original language: Thai
- No. of seasons: 1
- No. of episodes: 12

Production
- Executive producer: Thunya Phovijit/ Attapol Na Bangchang
- Producer: Satha Sathathip
- Production location: Moonstar Studio 1
- Camera setup: The Studio
- Running time: Reality Show 24 hrs / Live Show: Sunday 15.30-17.30
- Production companies: TrueVisions, Comedy Line

Original release
- Network: Channel 7
- Release: 3 February – 21 April 2013

The Comedian Thailand (Thai: เดอะ คอมเมเดียน ไทยแลนด์) is a 24-hour Reality show based on teaching contestants the art of comedy; a combination of Thai cultural background and modern comedy makes the program undeniably unique. One of the most challenging forms of entertainment is creating laughter. The program aims to prove that not all comedians are born to be, and that one can actually be taught. In order to prove this theory, “The Comedian Thailand”, Thailand's first ever “Comedy-Reality-Contest-Show” came to life, to find “The Ultimate Entertainer”, who can sing, dance and create laughter.

== Contestants ==
Name	Age at entry	Audition from	Hometown
C1 Ty, Apisit Naraj	18	Isan	Chaiyaphum
C2 Kwan, Tanyalak Tasa	20	North	Chiang Mai
C3 Kengkaj, Narongsak Angkabb	25	Isan	Roi Et
C4 Koon, Anupat Tongpan	23	North	Phichit
C5 Ken, Ken Hasegawa	22	Central	Bangkok
C6 Nacky, Nobpadol Damrong	19	Central	Ayutthaya
C7 Net, Tanaporn Polpong	25	Central	Nakhon Sawan
C8 Art, Aukkarawat Aeumsamang	22	Central	Bangkok
C9 Luk Moo, Sornrawee Limtaweewat	24	Central	Bangkok
C10 Aul, Prakpoom Jongmunwattana	24	Central	Nonthaburi
C11 Ded, Jaded Vanichcho	26	Isan	Udon Thani
C12 Hone, Thanatorn Sribanjong	18	Central	Bangkok
C13 Tom, Teerapol Homjom	20	North	Chiang Rai
C14 Katai, Rapeeporn Puengphet	21	Central	Nakhon Ratchasima
C15 Naii, Mongkol Saaadboonyapat	25	Central	Nakhon Sawan
C16 Nutty, Nutthapong Intawajjana	21	Central	Ang Thong
C17 Srinoom, Tanawut Srithep	21	Isan	Khon Kaen
C18 Andress, Anders Yossapol Helekezen	19	Central	Bangkok
C19 Kaofang, Veerin Nakawarong	24	Central	Bangkok
C20 Saii, Pornsawan Sukjitt	18	South	Nakhon Si Thammarat

== Elimination chart ==
Season 1
Female	Male	Top 20	Top 10	Runner-Up	Winner

Did Not Perform	Safe	Bottom	Eliminated	Save

Stage;		Finals											Grand Finale
Week:		1	2	3	4	5	6	7	8	9	10	11	12
Place	Contestant	Result											
1	C14 Katai				Bottom 4					Bottom 4	Bottom 4		Winner
2	C5 Ken												Runner-Up
3	C12 Hone										Save		3rd Place
4	C15 Naii							Bottom 4			Bottom 4		4th Place
5	C3 Kengkaj								Bottom 4				5th Place
6	C20 Saii						Bottom 4						6th Place
7	C6 Nacky			Bottom 4			Bottom 4						7th Place
8	C13 Tom		Bottom 4					Save				Bottom 4	8th Place
9	C19 Kaofang									Bottom 4		Bottom 4	9th Place
10	C8 Art				Save	Bottom 4		Bottom 4		Bottom 4		Bottom 4	10th Place
11	C17 Srinoom	Bottom 4		Bottom 4		Bottom 4			Bottom 4		Bottom 4	Elim	
12	C2 Kwan	Bottom 4	Bottom 4		Bottom 4	Bottom 4	Bottom 4	Bottom 4	Bottom 4	Elim			
13	C18 Andress		Bottom 4						Elim			Return	Elim
14	C9 Luk Moo				Bottom 4			Elim					
15	C16 Nutty					Elim		Return	Elim				
16	C1 Ty				Elim		Return	Elim					
17–18	C10 Aul			Elim				Return	Elim				
17–18	C11 Ded	Bottom 4		Elim							Return	Elim	
19–20	C4 Koon		Elim										
19–20	C7 Net	None Elim	Elim										
