= Ebola (band) =

Thai rock band

- Origin: Bangkok, Thailand
- Genres: Rock; hard rock; alternative rock; post-hardcore; metalcore; alternative metal; nu metal
- Years active: 1996–present
- Labels: Warner Music Thailand (2002–2008, 2011–2017); GMM GRAMMY (2009–2011) ME Records (2017-present)
- Members: Kittisak Buaphan (Aey) – lead vocals Wannit Puntarikapa (Golf) – lead guitar Surapong Buaphan (Ao) – rhythm guitar Chaowalit Prasongsin (A) – bass guitar Pongpan Peonimit (Pan) – drums

Ebola (อีโบล่า) is a Thai rock band from Bangkok, currently signed to ME Records. The band is most known for their songs "Saeng Sawang" (แสงสว่าง - Enlighten), "Klab Su Jud Reum Ton" (กลับสู่จุดเริ่มต้น - Back to Beginning), and "Sing Tee Chan Pen" (สิ่งที่ฉันเป็น - As I Am).

== Biography ==
Ebola was formed in 1996 while the members were studying at Dhonburi Rajabhat University. They spent years performing under the name Ebola, mainly as an underground band, and gained popularity with their energetic live performances. Ebola released three records (one EP and two studio albums) under independent labels, namely E.P 97 (Demo – 1997), In My Hate (1999) and Satisfy (2001).

The band released their first live album, Ebola Live, under the distribution of Warner Music Thailand in 2002. Later that year, they also released their Live to Play VCD.

Ebola gained wider attention when they released Pole, their third studio album, in 2004. Ebola had the opportunity to perform as the opening act for Linkin Park and Slipknot during their 2004 tours in Thailand.

Enlighten was released in August 2005. The album contained chart-topping hits including "Saeng Sawang" (แสงสว่าง - Enlighten), "Klab Su Jud Reum Ton" (กลับสู่จุดเริ่มต้น - Back to Beginning), and "Sing Tee Chan Pen" (สิ่งที่ฉันเป็น - As I Am). The band's long-time producer, Warut Rintranuku, won Best Producer at the 2005 Seed Awards, and they won the Best Rock Album award from Hamburger magazine.

On 25 March 2006 the celebrate their 10th anniversary, the band held Survivor Concert. The concert took place at Thunder Dome, Muang Thong Thani.

In April 2007, the single "Sing Tee Chan Pen" (สิ่งที่ฉันเป็น - As I Am) was selected to be a theme song of the movie Me ... Myself. The film, produced and directed by Pongpat Wachirabunjong, starred Ananda Everingham and Chayanan Manomaisantibhap.

The Way was their fifth album: its lead single was "Wi Tee Thang" (วิถีทาง - The Way) in August 2007. Ebola was nominated for Producer of the Year, Rock Album of the Year, and Rock Artist of the Year at the 2007 Seed Awards but didn't win.

In 2009, it was revealed that Ebola had signed a new contract with GMM Grammy.

Collaborating internationally, the band worked with the Philippine rock band Rivermaya on the song "Thang Leuk" (ทางเลือก - The Choice). The Way was mastered by Dave Collins.

In 2010, Ebola released their sixth studio album, titled 5:59. The album contained singles such as "Aow Hai Tai" (เอาให้ตาย - To The Death) and "Wan Tee Mai Mee Jing" (วันที่ไม่มีจริง - The Day That Doesn't Exist).

In 2011, Ebola opened for Linkin Park's Live in Bangkok A Thousand Suns World Tour 2011.

Ebola released their seventh studio album via Warner Music in 2013, entitled Still Alive (EP: 2013).

== Band members ==
- Kittisak "Aey" Buaphan – Lead vocals
- Wannit "Golf" Puntarikapa – Lead guitar
- Surapong "Ao" Buaphan – Rhythm guitar
- Chaowalit "A" Prasongsin – Bass guitar
- Pongpan "Pan" Peonimit – Drums

== Discography ==
- E.P.97 (Demo) (1997)
- In My Hate (1998)
- Satisfy (2000)
- Pole (2004)
- Enlighten (2005)
- The Way (2007)
- 5:59 (2010)
- Still Alive (EP: 2013) (2013)

== Live albums ==
- EBOLA LIVE (2002)
- SURVIVOR CONCERT (2006)

== Performances ==
- DEMONIC CONCERT (1997）
- EBOLA LIVE (2002)
- CAMPUS TOUR (2002)
- PATTAYA MUSIC FESTIVAL (2003)
- EBOLA POLE LIVE (2004)
- TERRITORY (2004）
- DEMONIC CONCERT(2004)
- LINKIN PARK: LIVE IN BANGKOK (2004)
- SLIPKNOT: LIVE IN BANGKOK (2004)
- EBOLA ENLIGHTEN SEED CONCERT (2005)
- 100 ROCK CONCERT (2005)
- EBOLA SURVIVOR CONCERT (2006)
- LINKIN PARK: A THOUSAND SUNS TOUR LIVE IN BANGKOK (2011)
- G16* (genie fest 16)(*only Aey Ebola as special guest for sweet mullet's cover of เอาให้ตาย) (2014)
- BLACK VALETINES (2020)
