= Jao Nang =

- poster
- Genre: Horror; Romance; Period Drama
- Screenplay by: Kom Kaothong
- Story by: Thongprim
- Directed by: Adul Boonbutr
- Country of origin: Thailand

Production
- Running time: approx. 60-70 minutes (per episode)
- Production company: Kantana Group

Original release
- Network: Channel 5
- Release: 8 June – 22 September 1994

Jao Nang, also known as The Princess's Terror (Thai: เจ้านาง; RTGS: Chao Nang), is a period horror Lakorn which originally aired in 1994 and became known among Thai viewers as the most frightening lakorn. It starred Chakkrit Amarat (จักรกฤษณ์ อำมะรัตน์) and Kavinna Suvannaprateep (กวินนา สุวรรณประทีป) in the leading roles.

It tells the story of a misunderstood princess who was tortured even after death by the evil power of Phi Pop (ผีปอบ), a ghost of popular Thai folklore.

== Plot ==
Many years before, during the colonial time, Mong Nai was one of the targets of the British army. Meanwhile, Rab Fah, the crown prince of Mong Nai was arranged to marry his half-sister Pin Muang. The prince, however, would like to marry his biological sister, La-Ong Kam but due to political reasons, they had to be separated. Pin Muang's maternal grandfather was the ruler of Möng Pawn which was the main military supporter to Mong Nai. Even worse, La-Ong Kam's mother, the former consort of Mong Nai was accused of adultery, causing Pin Muang to regularly bully and insult La-Ong Kam for having poisonous mother. The only support La-Ong Kam had was Rung Kaew, her younger sister.

One day, while La-Ong Kam and Rung Kaew went to their mother's grave to pray respect, they met the old lady who sold "spirits" which came in a cone made out of banana leaves, filled with flowers and incenses. The lady advised them to buy her spirit so that it could help them fixing any problems that may cause. These spirits were once prayed and treated by their descendants but due to hard circumstances, they cannot treat the ancestors' spirits and turned them evil from "hunger". These spirits became "Phi Pop", they would possess people and eat raw food or flesh to fulfill their hunger. To get rid of these evil spirits, they would be sold to other people so that the former owner would relieve from the evil spirits' power.

After several bullyings and tortures, La-Ong Kam, while almost sentenced to death, told Rung Kaew to buy the spirit for helping her survive. La-Ong Kam finally got rid of the death sentence thanks to the power of "Phi Jao", the Phi Pop spirit that Rung Kaew bought for her. In exchange, La-Ong Kam revenged her grudge by told Pee Jao to possess Pin-Muang and eat her alive.

When the British raided Mong Nai, the royal family had to flee from the state. During the rest stop, La-Ong Kam sneaked to the cliff and threw away the banana leaf cone that was used to pray their ancestors' spirits but kept her Phi Jao's banana leaf cone to herself even if Rung Kaew tried to stop her but La-Ong Kam did not care. When her father knew, he was furious and shocked to death. Before dying, La-Ong Kam's father cursed her that her life would be a "living hell" for disrespecting the ancestors.

La-Ong Kam and Rung Kaew saw the boat that was going to Bangkok, so they hitchhiked the boat and travelled to Bangkok with them. As the boat moving along the river, La-Ong Kam asked Phi Jao for killing all other people on the boat in exchange for obtaining all their valuables.

La-Ong Kam and Rung Kaew arrived in Bangkok and bought a house there. Every time Phi Jao was hungry, La-Ong Kam had to be its "host" to hunt preys and eat them. Rung Kaew could not stand her cold blooded evilness and went to live in the temple. La-Ong Kam remarried to a man from Bangkok named Chat and had one daughter, Apsorn. Tragically, Chat was also eaten alive by La-Ong Kam while Apsorn was sent to live abroad by her father to prevent La-Ong Kam to eat her after him.

Many years passed, Apsorn had got married and had one daughter, Monthip who shared somewhat similar face with La-Ong Kam. La-Ong Kam was then very old and got no one to sacrifice Phi Jao. Phi Jao finally saw her useless and ate her while Phi Jao sought its new host to be a black cat. La-Ong Kam and Phi Jao were then in one entity with the black cat as a medium. Sometimes, La-Ong Kam's spirit would haunt Apsorn to take Phi Jao from her as its heir, and sometimes the black cat (Phi Jao) would hurt people, luring them to be eaten for fulfilling its hunger.

As Apsorn and Monthip returned to Thailand, La-Ong Kam's ghost haunted them all day long just to convince them to sacrifice themselves to Phi Jao. Apsorn fled the evil ghost by living with then-elder Rung Kaew in the temple. Monthip was convinced for many times but she did still not believe in ghosts until La-Ong Kam and Phi Jao caused the troubles to her.

Monthip was engaged to Boonsalak but Boonsalak's mother and aunt resisted. They would like Boonsalak to marry Khemika, the billionaire's daughter. Boonsalak's mother and aunt also thought that Monthip was a Phi Pop that would kill people and eat their flesh because of the news on a tabloid, causing them to hate Monthip even more.

From many pressures and insults, Monthip began to trust her grandmother and prayed Phi Jao to help her get rid of Khemika. Khemika was terrifyingly killed and disemboweled by the evil power of Phi Jao. Boonsalak's mother and aunt were mortified and sent to mental hospital. Although Boonsalak and Monthip could happily get married, Phi Jao turned to Boonsalak for its next target. Boonsalak loved his wife so much that he sacrificed himself to be under Phi Jao's control. When Rung Kaew and Apsorn knew, they came to stopped the couple to be under influence of Phi Jao as the evil spirit possessed both Boonsalak and Monthip and tried to disembowel them.

La-Ong Kam's spirit though was released from Phi Jao's influence, she was sent to hell to get punished for all her karmas she caused. Rung Kaew and Apsorn tried to help her by convincing her to apologize to the ancestors. La-Ong Kam, after being tortured from punishment, finally beg for forgiveness from the ancestors. The ancestors' spirits then invited Lord Yama to drag Phi Jao to hell for punishment while letting Monthip and Boonsalak released from the ghost's possession.

Boonsalak's mother was cured from mental illness and was surprised to see Monthip came to apologize her. The mother-in-law finally admitted Monthip as part of family. Boonsalak's aunt, in the mean time, got a car crash while being hallucinated and running away from everyone. Boonsalak wished to ordain as a Buddhist monk to give boons and good will to every spirits of Phi Jao, La-Ong Kam, and Monthip's preys.

== Reception ==
The lakorn received an extremely high rating among Thai viewers and was one of the highest rated lakorn for Channel 5. Thai viewers recently rated it as one of the scariest lakorn ever.
