= Channel 7HD (Thailand) =

Thai television network

- Logo used since 25 April 2014
- Country: Thailand
- Headquarters: Chatuchak, Bangkok, Thailand

Programming
- Language: Thai
- Picture format: 1080i HDTV

Ownership
- Owner: Bangkok Broadcasting & Television
- Parent: Bank of Ayudhya

History
- Launched: 27 November 1967; 58 years ago

Links
- Website: www.ch7.com

Availability

Terrestrial
- Digital: Channel 35 (HD) (TV5 MUX2)

Streaming media
- CH7ON: Watch live Thailand only (It can be accessed with a VPN overseas)
- TrueID: Watch live Thailand only (It can be accessed with a VPN overseas)

Channel 7HD, formerly known as Bangkok Broadcasting & Television Company Limited Channel 7 (Thai: สถานีโทรทัศน์สีกองทัพบกช่อง 7) is Thailand and Bangkok's first commercial free-to-air television network that was launched on 27 November 1967 as Thailand and Bangkok's first commercial television station. It is the first color television channel to be broadcast in Mainland Southeast Asia. It is currently owned by Bangkok Broadcasting & Television. It is headquartered in Mo Chit, Chatuchak, Bangkok.

== History ==
Channel 7 officially launched broadcasts in Bangkok as Thailand's first commercial television channel on 27 November 1967 at 7:00 pm Bangkok Time. The channel's broadcast area was only limited to Bangkok Metropolitan Area (Bangkok, the capital and the surrounding areas) only. It was presided over by the then Prime Minister of Thailand Field Marshal Thanom Kittikachorn. The first programme to air was the 1967 Miss Thailand Pageant. The channel initially shared its facilities with the black-and-white Channel 7, which is now Channel 5. Channel 7 was known back then as "Bangkok Colour Television Network", with callsign HSB-TV, airing on Channel 7 in the 625-line standard (simulcast on Channel 9 in the 525-line standard) and was the country's first colour television station using PAL colour. On 1 January 1972, it started broadcasting nationwide. In 1974, the 525-line relays were turned off, with the channel broadcasting exclusively on VHF Channel 7.

A regional station opened in Phuket on 9 October 1980. Up until then Phuket only had one television station, an MCOT/PRD station on channel 11. As of 1988, it was the only truly national commercial television network, at a time when channels 3, 5 and 9 announced that they would increase their transmitter networks in 1989.

Channel 7 launched its high-definition television feed on 25 April 2014 on its digital terrestrial television system (DTT) on channel 35. Three years later, on 19 June 2017, Channel 7 was given authorisation from the National Broadcasting and Telecommunications Commission to shut down its analogue frequencies in the rest of the country, in order to replace them with its digital channels on DTT. Thus, the network was expected to stop broadcasting on analogue 1 January 2018, but the process was postponed to 16 May 2018 and eventually completed on 16 June.

In 2017, it was the most-watched channel out of all 25 terrestrial television networks available, surpassing Channel 3. That year was the first time its morning news surpassed Channel 3's in ratings, coupled by administrative changes and challenges.

In July 2020, the Election Commission requested Channel 7 to cease broadcast of the television drama series 'Love Song of the Gun Crack' over one of the actors, Krungsrivilai Sutin Phueak, who decided to run as the people's representative for Samut Prakan's 5th District. The series was then suspended from 30 July to 9 August.

== Programming ==
=== Notable sports ===
- Channel 7 Boxing Stadium
- Fairtex Fight Promotion

=== Notable television series ===
- Khu Kam (1990)
- Pob Pee Fah (1990)
- Poot Mae Nam Khong (1992)
- Dao Pra Sook (1994)
- Rak Nakara (2000)
- Phikun Thong (2003)
- Uttai Tawee (2003)
- Thep Sam Rudoo (2005)
- Brave Man Standing (2008)
- Nang Tard (2008)
- Poot Mae Nam Khong (2008 remake)
- Silamanee (2008)
- Pob Pee Fa (2009 remake)
- Suea Sang Fah (2011)
- Dut Tawan Dang Phu-pha (2012)
- Look Poochai Mai Ta Pode (2012)
- Fai Huan (2013)
- Suea Sung Fah II: Payak Payong (2013)
- Pleng Rak Pha Puen Taek (2014)
- Plerng Phra Nang (2017)
- Tulip Thong (2017)
- Sarawat Yai (2019)
- Lhong Klin Chan (2021)
- Satja Nai Chum Joan (Suea Sang Fah III) (2022)

=== Notable television shows ===
- The Comedian Thailand (2013)
- Dancing with the Stars Thailand (2013)
- MasterChef Thailand (2017–present)
- MasterChef Junior Thailand (2018–present)
- Who Wants to Be A Millionaire?

== News Anchors ==
=== Current ===
- Swiss Leelapongwattana
- Premsuda Santiwattana
- Kammalat Aedsrichai
- Sornsawan Phuvichit
- Chohfah Lhaoariya
- Jetsada Upani
- Panurat Saneebutr
- Muanfun Prasarnpanit
- Napassakorn Sereerojanasiri
- Sajee Wongampai
- Nicharee Padthong
- Sukonphet Phonpradittanon
- Nilawan Panitrungruang
- Gainsit Kanthachan
- Krisda Nuanmee
- Buabucha Punnanan
- Pinpinat Thakulweeranan
- Jeeranan Khetpong
- Thanaphat Kittibodeesakul
- Thanit Kaewnak
- Chompoonuch Piyathammachai
- Natphatsorn Simasathien
- Nattawut Phanpiwat
- Thanaphat Kittibodeesakul
- Thirat Phopanich
- Paphada Kleunsumarn
- Peerawat Kulananwat

=== Former ===
- Ekkachai Nophajinda (died in 1997)
- Natchaya Sanguansuk
- Vanessa Samucsaruth (now at 9MCOT)
- Pichayapa Sutabutra (now at TNN16)
- Chada Somboonphol
- Rossarin Prakobthan
- Sompotch Toraksa
- Tin Chokkamonkij
- Nantipat Pothapan
- Pisit Kiratikankul
- Pattrawan Panichcha
- Songkan Achariyasub
- Adisorn Puengya
- Wathit Treekruthaphan
- Thanyalak Chatyalak
- Piphat Witthayapanyanon
- Todd Thongdee

== See also ==
- Television in Thailand
