= Thai television soap opera =

Television genre

Lakorn (ละคร pronounced [la.kʰɔːn] related to Javanese ꦭꦏꦺꦴꦤ꧀ lakon from ꦭꦏꦸ laku "behavior") or lakhon is a popular genre of fiction in Thai television known in Thai as ละครโทรทัศน์ RTGS: lakhon thorathat (lit. "television drama"). They are shown generally at prime-time on Thai television channels, starting usually on, before or approximately at 20:25–20:30 hrs local time. An episode of a prime-time drama is between 45 minutes to two hours long including commercials. Each series is a finished story, unlike Western "cliffhanger" dramas, but rather like Hispanic telenovelas.

The first television drama in Thailand was Suriyani Mai Yom Taengngan (สุริยานีไม่ยอมแต่งงาน, lit. "Suriyani sent a mitten") starring Mom Rajawongse Thanadsri Svasti and Chotirot Samosorn with Nuanla-or Thongnuedee from the composition of Nai Ramkarn (Prayad Sor Nakanat) broadcast on January 5, 1956, on Channel 4 Bangkhunphrom (now Channel 9), the first Thai television station. It can be considered the broadcast happened only two months after the establishment of the station.

A series will run for about three months. It may air two or three episodes a week, the pattern being Monday–Tuesday, Wednesday–Thursday Monday-Thursday (weekday slots) or Friday–Sunday (weekend slot). A channel will air three soap operas simultaneously at any given time (each producing their own series by separate production houses). Channels will compete for the most popular stars as they attract the most viewers. Some examples are Channel 3, 5, and 7 as well to a lesser extent on Channel 9.

While the "best" series are shown at night right after the news, the ones with a smaller profiles (and shorter run times) will be shown in the evenings from 17:00–18:00. In some cases, the most popular prime-time series are shown on re-runs a couple of years after their initial release, generally in the afternoon.

A lakorn episode is normally 1 hour or 30 minutes. When broadcasting internationally, the running time is around 45 min. per episode.

Since January 20, 2023, every Friday night after the second edition of the evening news, Channel 7 stopped airing its regular television dramas. Instead, the station began broadcasting live combat sport matches from ONE Championship, marking a significant shift in the Thai television industry.

Starting from September 6 of the same year, Channel 7 introduced a new prime-time slot for television dramas from 8:30 p.m. to 9:30 p.m., reducing the drama broadcast to just one hour. Only one drama would air Monday through Thursday, while another drama would be shown over the weekend. After 9:30 p.m., the station began airing Korean dramas, starting with Ghost Doctor (2022).

By mid-2024, Thai television dramas faced a crisis due to a sharp decline in viewership. Most audiences had shifted toward watching dramas in the format of "series", including foreign titles from China and Korea, as well as streaming platforms like Netflix. This change led to a significant drop in advertising revenue on free TV channels. Many actors found themselves out of work.

One notable example is The Legend of Nang Nak, a 2024 adaptation of the Mae Nak Phra Khanong story on Channel 3, directed by Taweewat Wantha (known for horror films Death Whisperer and Death Whisperer 2). Although originally scheduled to premiere on July 16, the show was postponed indefinitely. In its place, the station began re-running old dramas. Many channels slowed down drama production, and the veteran actor–producer duo Chatchai and Sinjai Plengpanich shut down their production company.

Eventually, The Legend of Nang Nak premiered its first episode on October 14 of the same year.

== Genre ==
Romance, Comedy, Thriller, Action, Psychological, etc. Apart from Lakorn, Boys Love or BL series are booming across the globe.

== Folk stories ==
Thai television soap operas have contributed to popularize the spirits and legends of the folklore of Thailand. Some soap operas, such as "Raeng Ngao", include the popular ghosts in Thai culture interacting with the living, while others are based on traditional Thai legends and folk tales such as "Nang Sib Song", "Kaki" and "Thep Sarm Rudoo".

== Law ==
Thailand has strict censorship laws on films containing nudity, sexual intercourse, smoking opium, or which might offend religious sensibilities. There are no classifications to rate films for different ages so censors often obscure scenes by scratching the celluloid or smudging it with a translucent gel. When actors are playing cards in TV series, a sentence displays that playing cards with money is forbidden by the law.

On Thai television, Chinese, Japanese, American, and Indian films are broadcast.

Some series are subject to a rating. Most of BBTV Channel 7 programs are usually rated as PG-18 (children under 18 should seek parental guidance).

== International broadcasts ==
Prior to the 2000s, Thai TV soap operas were primarily popular in neighbouring countries such as Myanmar, Cambodia and Laos. Several Cambodian television channels aired Thai soap operas instead of their local ones. Dao Pra Sook was the most popular series for Khmer viewers. Occasionally, due to historical conflicts between the neighbouring countries, the content of these television programs would lead to offline political conflicts. For example, a plot line concerning Angkor Wat led to riots at the Thai embassy in Cambodia and Thai lakorn were banned in early–2003. However, in 2015, Thai content rapidly returned to popularity amongst Cambodian viewers and while they're mainly viewed on online platforms, many television stations were also broadcasting Thai dramas.

Apart from their immediate neighbours, Thai dramas have become increasingly popular in other Southeast Asian countries. Over the years, several Thai TV soap operas have begun to become popular in Singapore as Nang Tard and Love Destiny aired successfully in that country. They are usually broadcast in Singapore one or two weeks after airing in Thailand, primarily on Mediacorp's Channel U. In 2020, Mediacorp announced that they will be airing a comprehensive set of Thai television content to their streaming platforms with English & Mandarin subtitling option. Several Thai hit series have also been broadcast on major national public or commercial television channels in Malaysia (TV3), Indonesia (Rajawali TV), and Vietnam (VTV1). Likewise, Thai content has also gained considerable following in the Philippines, with numerous Thai series such as 2gether: The Series and The Gifted, regularly topping Twitter trends in the country. In 2018, GMA announced that they will be broadcasting more Thai series and exploring collaboration options for production and talent development. ABS-CBN have also announced that they will be airing multiple Thai series on Kapamilya Channel and their streaming platform, as well as further partnership with GMMTV. Filipino newspaper Daily Tribune stated that "Thai lakorn (“television play”),...is slowly inching its way to the top of the tier."

Outside Southeast Asia, Thai television content has also gained popularity in the broader Asian region. In the 2000s, many Thai soap operas aired in China, dubbed into Chinese. With the advent of online and digital media, Thai television content continued to gain popularity in China through word of mouth and viral hits on social networking sites such as Bilibili & Weibo. By the late 2010s, Thai content became a mainstay of Chinese streaming platforms, which led to many Chinese companies forming partnerships and collaborating with Thai production companies, such as iQIYI forming a partnership with RS Television to remake Thai content for Chinese audiences. Over the years, numerous Thai series were adapted and remade for Chinese audiences through such collaborations as Project S: The Series & My Husband in Law. In 2011, Thai dramas quickly became popular in China, with a high performance-price ratio, passing South Korean dramas as the second most popular country of origin for foreign shows in China, following Hong Kong dramas. The rise of Thai entertainment in China has had an effect in other aspects of Thai-China relations, with Thai dramas credited as being partially responsible for the popularity of Thailand as a tourism destination amongst Chinese travellers and being consistently awarded as 'Weibo's most popular destination' award. Meanwhile in Japan, Thai dramas experienced a boom in 2020, with Yahoo Japan stating that "the Thai wave is coming after the Korean wave." While the initial boom was led by Thai BL dramas such as 2gether and SOTUS, the introduction of Thai entertainment to the Japanese market led Japanese consumers to explore other Thai entertainment content as well. After months of sustained popularity, TV Asahi announced a business partnership with GMMTV to "deliver fresh and stellar Thai content to the Japanese market and further unlock the great potential 'Thai style' entertainment holds". In India, Thai BL dramas have increased in popularity among Indian women since the early 2020s. In 2023, Indian streaming platform MX Player began broadcasting Hindi-dubbed Thai dramas on its platform for the South Asian market.

With its rising popularity, numerous streaming platforms such as Netflix, Line TV and WeTV have purchased Thai content to stream to global audiences. Aside from airing the content, many of the streaming platforms have also formed partnership with Thai production houses to develop their own original content for their platforms.

Thai soap operas are available in Nepal alongside English language, Hindi, Korean and Chinese dramas.

Thai soap operas are available to stream with subtitles on Iflix in Sri Lanka.

Recently, a historical romantic drama set in the Ayutthaya Kingdom Love Destiny (2018) became a hit across countries including Russia.

In 2021, Thai primetime Lakorns have started to broadcast via Netflix worldwide in the same as in Thailand.

== Records ==
- Khu Kam was based on a novel of the same name by Thommayanti, starring pop star Thongchai McIntyre and Kamolchanok Komoltithi, broadcast on Channel 7 in early 1990. It created the phenomenon by being the highest-rated television in the Thai television industry with ratings up to 40 to this day. In addition to this, the main theme song of the drama by Peerapong Polchana and Kamolchanok Komoltithi became a major hit and remains popular to this day.
- Dao Pra Sook became the most popular series in the 1990s and one of the first of leading the Thai soap opera reputation into aboard screen within the highest rate drama at 1994 including several foreign release. The highest rated country after Thailand, is Cambodia with giving the nickname for Suvanant Kongying as the morning star as well as the title of the series.
- Susan Khon Pen is a series which mostly remake as at least three times just in only one channel.
- Sisa Marn is noted the scariest series along with Pob Pee Fa and Tayat Asoon.
- In 2008, Kom Faek set the record for the highest rated Thai soap opera in history as well as for Channel 7, with almost 15 million viewers.
- Kaew Tah Pee has proved to be one of the most beloved series amongst international fans.
- Tawan Tud Burapha is the first Thai television series to be broadcast in Vietnam (on TVStar - SCTV11).
- Love Destiny has created many phenomena, for example, the rating surpassed 2.00 for the first time in many years, or make people interested in Thai history, as well as attract tourists dressed in traditional Thai costumes to visit historical places, such as Ayutthaya Historical Park, King Narai's Palace, etc.

== List of classic/folk-style series ==
- Kwan Fa Nah Dum (1983)
- Thep Sung Warn (1985)
- Thep Sarm Rudoo (1987)
- Ban Deang Nang Ay (1987)
- Jaoying Khuntong (1987)
- Kaew Na Mah (1987)
- Pi Khun Tong (1987–1988)
- Nang Sib Song (1988)
- Prasuton-Manora (1988)
- Tida Dao Dum (1988)
- Uthaitaywee (1989)
- Gomin (1989)
- Sung Singh Chai (1990)
- Malaithon (1991–1992)
- Janthakorop (1993)
- Bua Kaew Bua Tong (1993–1994)
- Bla Boo Tong (1994)
- Gro Pid Jid See (1995)
- Kraitong (1995)
- Mane Nope Gaow (1996)
- Nam Jai Mae (1997)
- Pra Rodthasen (1998)
- Laksanawong (1999)
- Nang Paya Prai (1999)
- Nang Sib Song (2000)
- Si Yod Kumon (2001)
- Kaew Na Mah (2001)
- Prasuton Manorah (2002)
- Uttai Tawee (2003)
- Thep Sarm Rudoo (2003)
- Singha Krai Phob (2004)
- Gomin (2006)
- Bua Kaew Juk Krod (2006)
- Pra Tinawong (2007)
- Sung Tung (2008)
- Bla Boo Tong (2009)
- Tuk Ka Tah Tong (2010)
- Darb 7 See Manee 7 Sang (2011)

== See also ==
- Television in Thailand
- List of Thai television soap operas
- List of BL dramas
