= Kammathep Jum Laeng =

Thai television series

- Also known as: Transforming Love; The Cupids Series: Kammathep Jum Laeng
- Original title: กามเทพจำแลง
- Genre: Romance; Comedy
- Written by: Praenut
- Screenplay by: นักเขียนเรืองแสง
- Directed by: Saranyu Jiralaksanakul
- Starring: Teeradetch Metawarayut; Kannarun Wongkajornklai
- Opening theme: หัวใจครึ่งดวง - Araya A. Hargate, Jarinporn Joonkiat, Cris Horwang, Namtarn Pichukkana, Nuttanicha Dungwattanawanich, Wawwa Nichari, Thikamporn Ritta-apinan, and Kannarun Wongkajornklai
- Ending theme: คู่ใจ - Teeradetch Metawarayut
- Country of origin: Thailand
- Original language: Thai
- No. of episodes: 7

Production
- Producer: Nong Arunosha Panupan
- Production location: Thailand
- Running time: 150 minutes
- Production company: Broadcast Thai Television

Original release
- Network: Channel 3
- Release: June 18 – July 2, 2017

Related
- Kammathep Sorn Kol; Kamathep Prab Marn

Kammathep Jum Laeng (Thai: กามเทพจำแลง, RTGS: Kammathep Chamlaeng, lit. 'disguised cupid') is a Thai lakorn, the seventh drama in the series The Cupids, based on a novel series of the same name. The novel is written by Praenut and the director is Saranyu Jiralaksanakul. It was aired every Friday–Sunday from June 18, until July 2, 2017.

== Synopsis ==
Prima (Kannarun Wongkajornklai), receives an order from Peem (Theeradej Wongpuapan), her boss to find Kevin Blake (Teeradetch Metawarayut), the CEO of Soulmate.com, a matchmaking company in America and many European countries. There are rumors in the matchmaking industry that Kevin is planning to expand his company in Asia. So Peem wants to sign a business deal with Kevin Blake because Peem wants to expand his company outside of Asia.

== Cast ==
=== Main ===
- Kannarun Wongkajornklai as Prima
- Teeradetch Metawarayut as Kawin / Kevin Blake

=== Supporting ===
- Nirut Sirijanya as Cupid
- Sukonthawa Koetnimit
- Supoj Chancharoen as Cook Chin
- Sira Patrat
- Penpak Sirikul as Kevin's aunt
- Trakarn Punthumlerdrujee as Greg Blake
- Chanokwanun Rakcheep as Praemai

=== Guest ===
- Theeradej Wongpuapan as Peem
- Araya A. Hargate as Waralee
- Jarinporn Joonkiat as Hunsa
- Pakorn Chatborirak as Tim Pitchayatorn
- Cris Horwang as Horm Meun Lee
- Nattapat Wipatcorntragoon as Angie
- Mintita Wattanakul as Cindy
- Thanalop Pridamanoch as Torn Pitchayatorn
- Techin Ploypetch
- Ratree Wittawat as Waralee's mom
- Oak Keerati

== Original soundtrack ==
Song title	Artist	Notes	Ref.
หัวใจครึ่งดวง (Half Heart)	Araya A. Hargate, Jarinporn Joonkiat, Cris Horwang, Namtarn Pichukkana, Nuttanicha Dungwattanawanich, Wawwa Nichari, Thikamporn Ritta-apinan, and Kannarun Wongkajornklai (Prang)	Opening theme	
คู่ใจ	Teeradetch Metawarayut	Closing theme	
