= The Cupids =

Thai television series

- Also known as: The Cupids Series; Ruk Uttaloot Company Series
- Thai: The Cupids บริษัทรักอุตลุด
- Genre: Romance; Comedy; Drama
- Based on: The Cupids
- Written by: Isaya; Umariga; Romkaew; Shayna; Sornklin; Kaotam; Praenut; Nara
- Directed by: Phawat Panangkasiri; Chajchavan Saswatgloon; Theeratorn Siriphunvaraporn; Pantham Thongsang; Attaporn Teemakorn; Saranyu Jiralaksanakul; Dulyasit Niyomgul
- Starring: Pakorn Chatborirak; Jarinporn Joonkiat; Prama Imanotai; Cris Horwang; Phupoom Pongpanu; Pichukkana Wongsarattanasin; Intad Leowrakwong; Nicha Chokprajakchat; Pongsakorn Mettarikanon; Thikamporn Ritta-apinan; Phakin Khamwilaisak; Nuttanicha Dungwattanawanich; Teeradetch Metawarayut; Kannarun Wongkajornklai; Theeradej Wongpuapan; Araya A. Hargate
- Country of origin: Thailand
- Original language: Thai
- No. of seasons: 1
- No. of episodes: 61

Production
- Producer: Nong Arunosha Panupan
- Production location: Thailand
- Production company: Broadcast Thai Television

Original release
- Network: Channel 3
- Release: March 5 – July 23, 2017

The Cupids (Thai: The Cupids บริษัทรักอุตลุด) is a Thai lakorn series consists of 8 dramas, Kammathep Hunsa, Kamathep Ork Suek, Kamathep Online, Loob Korn Kammathep, Sorn Ruk Kammathep, Kammathep Sorn Kol, Kammathep Jum Laeng, and Kamathep Prab Marn. The television series is based on the novel series of the same name written by Isaya, Umariga, Romkaew, Shayna, Sornklin, Kaotam, Praenut, and Nara.

The series was produced by Broadcast Thai Television with 7 different directors. It was aired every Friday–Sunday from March 5 until July 23, 2017.

== Synopsis ==
Four years ago, Peem (Theeradej Wongpuapan) established "Cupid Hut," a matchmaking company staffed by eight female employees across various departments who assist him in running the business. Currently, Peem has discovered that "Cupid Hut" is failing to meet its revenue targets. He believes this is due to his eight single female employees, as clients struggle to trust single matchmakers. On Valentine's Day, Peem urgently convened a meeting with his eight female employees and discovered that each of them faces challenges in matters of the heart. In an effort to save the company, Peem mandates that all eight employees secure boyfriends before the next Valentine's Day. Those who comply will receive a bonus of 1 million baht. Should his employees reject this directive, the company will cease operations, and all eight women will lose their jobs at the company they cherish.

== Broadcast order ==
The broadcast order of The Cupids Series
Title	Main casts	First airing date	Last airing date	Number of episodes
Kammathep Hunsa	Pakorn Chatborirak and Jarinporn Joonkiat	March 5, 2017	March 24, 2017	8
Kamathep Ork Suek	Prama Imanotai and Cris Horwang	March 25, 2017	April 8, 2017	7
Kamathep Online	Phupoom Pongpanu and Pichukkana Wongsarattanasin	April 9, 2017	April 29, 2017	9
Loob Korn Kammathep	Intad Leowrakwong and Nicha Chokprajakchat	April 30, 2017	May 14, 2017	7
Sorn Ruk Kammathep	Pongsakorn Mettarikanon and Thikamporn Ritta-apinan	April 19, 2017	June 2, 2017	7
Kammathep Sorn Kol	Phakin Khamwilaisak and Nuttanicha Dungwattanawanich	June 3, 2017	June 17, 2017	7
Kammathep Jum Laeng	Teeradetch Metawarayut and Kannarun Wongkajornklai	June 18, 2017	July 2, 2017	7
Kamathep Prab Marn	Theeradej Wongpuapan and Araya A. Hargate	July 7, 2017	July 23, 2017	9
