= Thikamporn Ritta-apinan =

Thai actress

- ทิฆัมพร ฤทธิ์ธาอภินันท์
- Born: Bangkok, Thailand
- Education: Thammasat University in Faculty of Humanities
- Occupation: Actress
- Years active: 2002–present

Signature
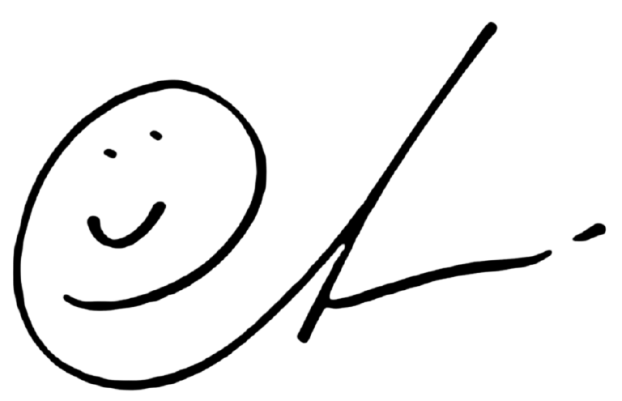

Thikamporn Ritta-apinan (Thai: ฑิฆัมพร ฤทธิ์ธาอภินันท์; RTGS: Thikhamphon Rittha-aphinan; "เชียร์"; is a Thai actress, who has appeared in several television shows on Channel 7.

== Education ==
Thikamporn Ritta-apinan studied at the Faculty of Social Administration of Thammasat University. In the aftermath of the controversial punishment of fellow TU student Chotiros Suriyawong for wearing a sexy black dress at the 2007 Subhanahongsa Awards, Tikamporn was chosen by University Assistant Rector for Student Affairs Prinya Thewanaruemitkul as the presenter of an official university campaign to urge students not to dress in a sexy manner.

In 2015, Ritta-apinan became freelance and appeared in "The Cupid Series" for Channel 3.

== Work ==
=== Film ===
Year	Title	Role	Notes
2010	How to Train Your Dragon	Astrid	Main Role
2014	How to Train Your Dragon 2	Astrid	Main Role
2018	7 Days	Nik	Support Role
2019	How to Train Your Dragon 3	Astrid	Main Role, Thai dubbing
2020	The Kill List	Angie	Main Role

=== Television series ===
Year	Thai title	English title	Network	Notes
2003	เบญจา คีตา ความรัก	Benja Keta Kwarm Ruk	Channel 7 (Thailand)	Main Role
2004	รักได้ไหมถ้าหัวใจไม่เพี้ยน	Rak Dai Mai Tar Hua Jai Mai Pean	Channel 7 (Thailand)	Main Role
2004	อุ่นไอรัก	Oun Ai Ruk	Channel 7 (Thailand)	Main Role
2004	รักสุดขั้ว	Ruk Sud Kua	Channel 7 (Thailand)	Main Role
2005	เกิดแต่ตม	Kerd Tae Tom	Channel 7 (Thailand)	Guest Role
2005	หมอผีไซเบอร์	Mor Pee Cyber	Channel 7 (Thailand)	Support Role
2006	7 มหัศจรรย	7 Mahatsajan	Channel 7 (Thailand)	Support Role
2006	ชุลมุนวุ่นรัก	Choolamoon Woon Rak	Channel 7 (Thailand)	Support Role
2006	สายลมกับสามเรา	Sai Lom Gub Sam Rouw	Channel 7 (Thailand)	Support Role
2006	ภารกิจ พิชิตดอกฟ้า	Parakit Pichit Dok Fah	Channel 7 (Thailand)	Support Role
2007	แก่งกระโดน	Gang Kradon	Channel 7 (Thailand)	Support Role
2007	เพียงผืนฟ้า	Pieng Peun Fah	Channel 7 (Thailand)	Support Role
2008	เธอคือชีวิต	Tur Keu Cheewit	Channel 7 (Thailand)	Guest Role
2008	มรดกบันเทิง	Moradok Bunterng	Channel 7 (Thailand)	Main Role
2008	คมแฝก	Kom Faek	Channel 7 (Thailand)	Support Role
2009	ศึกวันชูใจ	Seuk Wan Chu Jai	Channel 7 (Thailand)	Main Role
2009	รุกฆาต	Rook Kard	Channel 7 (Thailand)	Main Role
2010	โรบอนยอดรัก	Robot Yodruk	Channel 7 (Thailand)	Main Role
2010	นักสู้พันธุ์ข้าวเหนียว	Nak Su Phan Kao Niaw	Channel 7 (Thailand)	Main Role
2012	ปางเสน่หา	Pang Sanaeha	Channel 7 (Thailand)	Main Role
2012	แสบสลับขั้ว	Saeb Salup Kua	Channel 7 (Thailand)	Main Role
2013	วิมานมะพร้าว	Wimarn Mapraw	Channel 7 (Thailand)	Main Role
2014	พายุเทวดา	Payu Taewada	Channel 7 (Thailand)	Main Role
2014	คู่หูคู่เฮี้ยน	Koo Hoo Koo Hean	Channel 7 (Thailand)	Guest Role
2015	ปลาหลงฟ้า	Pla Lhong Fah	Channel 7 (Thailand)	Main Role
2017	The Cupids บริษัทรักอุตลุด กามเทพหรรษา	The Cupids Series; Kammathep Hunsa	Channel 3	Support Role
2017	The Cupids บริษัทรักอุตลุด กามเทพออกศึก	The Cupids Series; Kamathep Ork Suek	Channel 3	Support Role
2017	The Cupids บริษัทรักอุตลุด กามเทพออนไลน์	The Cupids Series; Kamathep Online	Channel 3	Support Role
2017	The Cupids บริษัทรักอุตลุด ลูบคมกามเทพ	The Cupids Series; Loob Korn Kammathep	Channel 3	Support Role
2017	The Cupids บริษัทรักอุตลุด ซ่อนรักกามเทพ	The Cupids Series; Sorn Ruk Kammathep	Channel 3	Main Role
2017	The Cupids บริษัทรักอุตลุด กามเทพซ้อนกล	The Cupids Series; Kammathep Sorn Kol	Channel 3	Support Role
2017	ตอน ความสุข	Club Friday Celeb's Stories: Happiness	GMM 25	Main Role
2017	7 วันจองเวร 2	7 Wun Jorng Wen 2	Workpoint TV	Main Role
2018	สาวน้อยร้อยหม้อ	Sao Noy Roy Mor	Workpoint TV	Main Role
2019	ปมรักสลับหัวใจ	Pom Ruk Salub Hua Jai	Channel 8	Main Role
2019	Club Friday The Series 11 รักที่ไม่ได้ออกอากาศ ตอน รักล้ำเส้น	Club Friday The Series Season 11: Ruk Lam Sen	GMM 25	Main Role
2019	เรือนไหมมัจจุราช	The Golden Silkworm	One 31	Main Role
2020	เพราะรักใช่ป่าว	Why R U?	One 31	Guest Role
2021	เล่ห์ลวง	Ley Luang	One 31	Main Role
2022	กระสือลำซิ่ง	Graseu Lam Sing	Channel 8	Main Role
2022	บุพเพร้อยร้าย	A Cunning Destiny	Channel 3	Main Role

=== Host show / MC / DJ ===
Year	Title	Host with
2006 - March 28, 2015	Channel 7 See Concert Show	Rapeepat Eakpankul
200? - 2015	Miss Teen Thailand	
September 4, 2017 - December 16, 2017	We Kid Thailand เด็กร้องก้องโลก 2	
July 16, 2016 - 2018	The Dr.Oz Thailand By Siriraj	นายแพทย์สกิทา ม่วงไหมทอง
2018–Present	The Price Is Right Thailand ราคาพารวย	Kathsepsawad Palakawong Na Ayyuttaya
2019–Present	เสียงสวรรค์ รางวัลชีวิต	Jiab Cheinyim
2020–Present	Davinci Game Show (Davinci เกมถอดรหัส)	Shahkrit Yamnam

=== Theater ===
Year	Thai title	Role
2019	สูตรเสน่หา The Musical	Alyn

== Discography ==
=== Soundtracks ===
Year	Song title	Notes
2003	ไม่อยากรบกวน	Benja Keta Kwarm Ruk OST
2003	เส้นทางของฉัน	Benja Keta Kwarm Ruk OST
2003	ดนตรีในหัวใจ	Benja Keta Kwarm Ruk OST
2003	เพื่อวันที่ดีกว่า	Benja Keta Kwarm Ruk OST
2005	เก็บดาวดวงนั้นด้วยตัวฉันเอง	Miss Teen Thailand Gang OST
2005	The Day, We Loved	Miss Teen Thailand Gang OST
2005	สัญญาจากเพื่อน	Miss Teen Thailand Gang OST
2006	ไม่ใช่เจ้าหญิง	Parakit Pichit Dok Fah OST
2015	คิดมาก (with Wongsakorn Paramatthakorn)	Pla Lhong Fah OST
2017	หัวใจครึ่งดวง (Hua Jai Kreung Duang) (with Araya A. Hargate, Toey Jarinpon, Cris Horwang, Namtarn Pichukkana, Wawwa Nichari, Nuttanicha Dungwattanawanich, and Kannarun Wongkajornklai (Prang))	The Cupids Series OST
