= Watcharapol Fueangjaidee =

- วัชรพล ฝึกใจดี
- Born: Watcharapol Fueangjaidee; 1 August 1977 (age 49); Bangkok, Thailand
- Other names: Jack The Ghost; DJ Jack; Jack Saisin
- Occupations: Radio host; ghost hunter; television host; film producer
- Years active: 2015–present
- Spouse: "Takky" Khemjira (m. 2023)
- Children: 1 including Thanakorn "Ghoster" Fueangjaidee

Watcharapol Fueangjaidee (Thai: วัชรพล ฝึกใจดี; born August 1, 1977), also popularly known as DJ Jack or Jack The Ghost is a well-known Thai radio host, best known for hosting an online radio program featuring stories about ghosts and the supernatural.

== Early life ==
Born in Bangkok into a poor family and had the opportunity to complete only primary school, Grade 6, which was the level of compulsory education at the time. His childhood was difficult and marked by severe hardship. He once lived on the streets and even came close to becoming involved in drug abuse. He struggled to make a living, working a variety of jobs, including as a gas station attendant, noodle shop server, computer repair technician, and restaurant waiter.

== Radio host career ==
One Halloween, Watcharapol invited Kapol Thongplub, better known as DJ Pong, a radio host who was regarded as an icon of ghost-storytelling on Thai radio, to a restaurant. At the time, Kapol owned a restaurant and was looking for employees, so Watcharapol joined him as a restaurant worker. He eventually had the opportunity to assist Kapol with his ghost-story radio program, filling in as a host and joining field investigations of abandoned houses and other deserted locations in search of paranormal activity. He gradually became well known among the program's listeners and viewers, particularly after Kaphon's radio program, The Shock, was adapted for television. At the time, he was known as "Jack Saisin."

After working as a member of The Shock team for approximately 22 years, he eventually left the program to launch his own online radio program, The Ghost Radio. This marked the origin of the name by which he became widely known, "Jack The Ghost."

The Ghost Radio first aired on October 10, 2015, at midnight via the HomeTheStationRadio website, initially attracting 17 listeners. The program currently broadcasts every Saturday and Sunday from 9:45 p.m. until nearly dawn via YouTube Live. Its distinctive storytelling style, combined with compelling content that evokes fear, excitement, and suspense, quickly made The Ghost Radio one of Thailand's most popular ghost-story programs. It currently attracts more than 100,000 listeners during live broadcasts. On February 11, 2024, the program set a new record, with more than 200,000 listeners tuning in simultaneously.

== Film producer career ==
In March 2025, he collaborated with Shinesaeng Ad.venture, a studio involved in film production and distribution, on a project called "Ghost Light". The project aims to produce horror films based on popular stories from The Ghost Radio's YouTube channel, for which the program holds the rights. The first film, Our House, directed by Kongkiat Komesiri, was released in late 2025. It was followed in mid-2026 by Confessions of a Shaman. The latter was a major commercial success, grossing more than 100 million baht, making it the third Thai film released in 2026 to surpass 100 million baht at the box office, following The Undertaker II and Gohan.

== Accolades ==
Year	Award	Subject	Result	Nominee
2024	People Awards 2024	-	Nominated	-
2025	13th Thailand Social Awards	Talk & Conversational Online Program	Won	The Ghost Radio
2025	HOFs Awards 2025	Horror Content Creator	Won	-
2025	GQ Men of the Year 2025	The Voice of the Night	Won	-
2026	The Viral Hits Awards 2025	Best Creator and Influencer of the Year	Nominated	The Ghost Radio
2026	14th Thailand Social Awards	Talk & Conversational Online Program	Won	The Ghost Radio
2026	The Viral Hits Love Moment Awards 2026	People's Choice for Positive Influencer Creator	Nominated	-
