= Love Beyond Frontier =

Love Beyond Frontier may refer to:

- Love Beyond Frontier (2008 TV series), a Thai drama television series
- Love Beyond Frontier (2019 TV series), a Thai television series remake of the above
