= Jarinporn Joonkiat =

Thai actress

- จรินทร์พร จุนเกียรติ
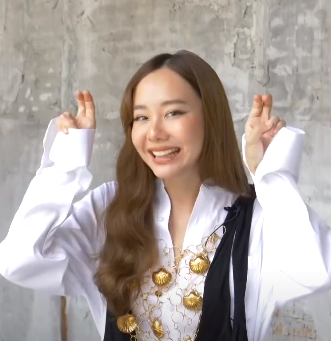
- Jarinporn in December 2022
- Born: 29 January 1990 (age 36); Bangkok, Thailand
- Other name: Toey (เต้ย)
- Education: Srinakharinwirot University; Mahidol University
- Occupations: Actress; host; environmentalist
- Years active: 2006–present
- Agents: GMMTV (2007–2013); Channel 3 (2014–2023)
- Notable work: Dear Galileo (2009); Countdown (2012); Timeline (2014); Kleun Cheewit (2017); Toong Sanaeha (2020); Matalada (2023)
- Height: 159 cm (5 ft 2 1/2 in)
- Website: Official website

Jarinporn Joonkiat (Thai: จรินทร์พร จุนเกียรติ, RTGS: Charinphon Chunkiat; born 29 January 1990), also known as Toey (Thai: เต้ย) is a Thai actress and television host. She is known for her work in both film and television, with roles in Dear Galileo (2009), Countdown (2012), Timeline (2014), Kleun Cheewit (2017), Toong Sanaeha (2020), and Matalada (2023). Formerly an exclusive artist with Channel 3, Jarinporn began working as a freelance actress following the end of her contract.

== Early life and education ==
Jarinporn was born in Bangkok, Thailand. She graduated from Srinakharinwirot University with a bachelor's degree in Fine Arts. She earned a master's degree in Environmental Social Sciences from Mahidol University. She has a younger brother, Achira.

== Career ==
Jarinporn gained attention through the contest Utip Freshy Idol 2007. She was also one of the female hosts of Sister Day on Channel 5, further contributing to her popularity as a teen idol. In November 2018, she appeared in the film Gravity of Love.

== Other ventures ==
On September 10, 2024, Italian luxury fashion house Prada named Jarinporn as the brand's first Thai female brand ambassador in the region.

== Personal life ==
Jarinporn had a relationship with Alexander Rendell. They remained good friends and business partners. In mid 2020, news reported that Teeradetch Metawarayut and her broke up after three years of dating.

== Filmography ==
=== Film ===
Year	Title	Role	Notes	Ref.
2009	Dear Galileo	Toey	Main Role	
2010	Maythawee	Maythawee Suwichakornkul	Main Role	
2012	Sorry		Main Role	
2012	Seven Something	Maythawee Suwichakornkul	Guest Role	
2012	Countdown	Bee	Main Role	
2014	Timeline	June	Main Role	
2017	The Moment	Praew	Main Role	
2017	Die Tomorrow	May	Main Role	
2018	Gravity of Love	Fah	Main Role	
2025	Same Day with Someone	Mesa	Netflix	
2026	Gohan	Meaow	Guest Role	

=== Television ===
Year	Title	Role	Notes	Network	Ref.
2006	Rak Hun Sa Karaoke	Ning Nong	Support Role	iTV	
2008	Ubatruk Karmkobfah	Ple	Main Role	Channel 9	
2009	Ubatruk Karmkobfah 2	Ple	Main Role	Channel 9	
2009	Ching Chang	Kanyaa / Koi	Support Role	Channel 5	
2009	Spy	Som	Support Role	Channel 9	
2009	Dok Ruk Rim Tang	Patch	Main Role	Channel 5	
2009	Chocolate 5 Reudoo	Thicha	Main Role	Channel 9	
2011	3 Nom Nuer Tong	Lumpao	Main Role	Channel 3	
2013	Look Mai Kong Por Series: Look Nee Tee Ruk	Aomsin / Kom	Main Role	Channel 3	
2014	Dao Kiang Duen	Ingfah / Fah	Support Role	Channel 3	
2014	Ruk Tong Oom	Mink	Support Role	Channel 3	
2015	Hong Hoon	Amara Sattayapha	Main Role	Channel 3	
2017	Kleun Cheewit	Piyakul / Piak	Support Role	Channel 3	
2017	Bunlang Dok Mai	Pudchompoo / "Pud"	Main Role	Channel 3	
2017	Kammathep Hunsa	Hunsa	Main Role	Channel 3	
2017	Kamathep Ork Suek	Hunsa	Support Role	Channel 3	
2017	Loob Korn Kammathep	Hunsa	Support Role	Channel 3	
2017	Kammathep Sorn Kol	Hunsa	Support Role	Channel 3	
2017	Kammathep Jum Laeng	Hunsa	Support Role	Channel 3	
2018	Mee Piang Rak	Jidapa / "Jaokha"	Main Role	Channel 3	
2020	Toong Sanaeha	Yupin	Main Role	Channel 3	
2020	Kwam Song Jum See Jang	Pang	Main Role	Channel 3	
2022	Suptar 2550	Toey	Guest Role	Channel 3	
2023	Matalada	Matalada	Main Role	Channel 3	
2023-2024	Mue Prab Krathak Rua	Khing	Main Role	Channel 3	
2025	Enigma Black Stage	Phlengphin	Main Role	One 31	
TBA	Khun Ying Jom Khaen		Main Role	Channel 3	

=== Music video appearances ===
Year	Song title	Artist	Ref.
2009	เศษส่วน	Getsunova	
2010	ระยะทำใจ	Napat Injaiuea	
2011	อย่าปล่อยให้คนคนนีงคิดถึงเธอ	Nararak Jaibumrung	
2012	คนไหนบ้าง	แพนเค้ก	
2013	ถามเอาอะไร	Nararak Jaibumrung	
2014	มีใครหรือยัง	เล้าโลม	
2015	จริงใจไม่จริงจัง	แพนเค้ก	
2020	ข้างเดียว (You've never seen)	ชาติ สุชาติ	
2020	หอมเธอ (Scent of love)	Ice Paris & Toey Jarin	
2021	ใจบาง	LOSTBOYS	
2022	ใจบาง (LOFI REMIX)	LOSTBOYS	
2022	สลักจิต	ป๊อบ ปองกูล	
2023	ยินดี	Sarah Salola feat. Toey Jarinporn	
2023	Cuteless	Perses feat. Jarinporn Joonkiat	
2023	Highway	Stoondio	

== Discography ==
Year	Song title	Notes	Ref.
2009	My Charming Stars	Utip Freshy Idol 3 Theme Song	
2011	Magic Girl in the Magic World	Utip Freshy Idol 4 Theme Song	
2011	ชอบที่เธอยิ้มมา	Love Status Album	
2013	Just Smile	Utip Freshy Idol 5 Theme Song	
2013	ออกไปกันป๊ะ	Miyabi Commercial Soundtrack	
2014	ไกลแค่ไหนคือใกล้	Timeline OST	
2014	บังเอิญ โลกกลม พรหมลิขิต	Toyota Vios Commercial Soundtrack	
2017	กลัวจะเผลอรักเธอไปสักวัน	Bunlang Dok Mai OST	
2017	หัวใจครึ่งดวง	The Cupids OST	
2018	ฝันเกินตัว (Folk Version)	Mee Piang Rak OST	
2020	หอมเธอ (Scent of love)	Paris Intarakomalyasut feat. Toey Jarinporn	
2023	ยินดี	Sarah Salola feat. Toey Jarinporn	
2023	Cuteless	Perses feat. Toey Jarinporn	

== Concerts ==
Year	Events	Notes	Ref.
2017	LOVE IS IN THE AIR: Channel 3 Charity Concert		

== Awards and nominations ==
Year	Awards	Category	Nominated work	Result	Ref.
2009	Top Awards 2009	Best Rising Star in Television Drama	Ubatruk Karmkobfah 2	Nominated	
2009	Top Awards 2009	Best Rising Star Female in Film	Dear Galileo	Nominated	
2009	Siam Dara Star Party 2009	Rising Star Woman	Ubatruk Karmkobfah 2	Won	
2009	Bangkok Critics Assembly Awards	Best Supporting Actress	Dear Galileo	Won	
2009	Kom Chad Luek Award	Best Supporting Actress	Dear Galileo	Nominated	
2009	Star Picks Award	Best Supporting Actress	Dear Galileo	Nominated	
2009	Chalermthai Award	Actress in a Supporting Role in a Thai Film of the Year	Dear Galileo	Nominated	
2009	Suphannahong National Film Awards	Best Supporting Actress	Dear Galileo	Nominated	
2012	Bang Awards 2012	Hot Girl of The Year	—N/a	Nominated	
2012	Suphannahong National Film Awards	Best Actress	Countdown	Nominated	
2012	Kom Chad Luek Award	Best Actress	Countdown	Nominated	
2012	Chalermthai Award	Best Actress	Countdown	Nominated	
2012	Bangkok Critics Assembly Awards	Best Actress	Countdown	Nominated	
2012	Dara Daily The Great Awards	Best Film Leading Actress of 2012	Countdown	Nominated	
2014	Siam Dara Star Awards 2014	Best Actress	Timeline	Won	
2015	Suphannahong National Film Awards	Best Actress	Timeline	Won	
2015	Ok Award 2015	ผู้หญิงที่ผู้ชายอยากเป็นแฟนด้วย	—N/a	Nominated	
2018	Bangkok Critics Assembly Awards	Best Supporting Actress	Die Tomorrow	Won	
2018	The 27th Suphannahong National Film Awards	Best Actress	Die Tomorrow	Nominated	
2018	The 15th Starpics Thai Film Awards	Best Supporting Actress	Die Tomorrow	Won	
2018	The 8th Thai Film Director Award	Best Supporting Actress	Die Tomorrow	Runner-up	
2021	The 17th Kom Chad Luek Award	Best Actress in Television Drama	Toong Sanaeha	Won	
2023	The Worlds Highest Awards	Global Star Media Awards	Matalada	Won	
2023	Howe Awards 2023	Howe popular actress Award	Matalada	Won	
2024	15th Nataraja Awards	Best Actress in a Long-Form Drama	Matalada	Nominated	
2024	38th TV Gold Awards	Best Actress	Matalada	Nominated	
2024	20th Kom Chad Luek Awards	Best Actress in a TV Series	Matalada	Nominated	
