= Headshot (2011 film) =

- English-language release poster
- Directed by: Pen-Ek Ratanaruang
- Screenplay by: Pen-Ek Ratanaruang
- Based on: Rain Falling Up the Sky by Win Lyovarin
- Produced by: Raymond Phathanavirangoon; Pawas Sawatchaiyamet
- Starring: Nopachai Jayanama; Sirin Horwang; Chanokporn Sayoungkul; Apisit Opasaimlikit
- Cinematography: Chankit Chamnivikaipong
- Edited by: Patamanadda Yukol
- Music by: Vichaya Vatanasapt
- Release date: September 11, 2011 (TIFF)
- Running time: 105 minutes
- Country: Thailand
- Language: Thai

Headshot (Thai: ฝนตกขึ้นฟ้า), is a 2011 Thai crime thriller film written and directed by Pen-Ek Ratanaruang. Based on the novel Rain Falling Up the Sky by Win Lyovarin, the film stars Nopachai Chaiyanam, Sirin Horwang, Chanokporn Sayoungkul, and Apisit Opasaimlikit.

Headshot premiered at the 2011 Toronto International Film Festival and was later screened at the 2012 San Diego Asian Film Festival Spring Showcase, as well as the 2012 Los Angeles Asian Pacific Film Festival. The film was selected as the Thai entry for the Best Foreign Language Oscar at the 85th Academy Awards, but did not make the final shortlist.

== Premise ==
A cop-turned-hitman is struck in the head by a bullet, inverting his vision and causing him to see the world upside down.

== Cast ==
- Nopachai Chaiyanam as Tul (as Nopporn Chaiyanam)
- Sirin Horwang as Rin
- Chanokporn Sayoungkul as Joy / Tiwa
- Apisit Opasaimlikit as Torpong
- Kiat Punpiputt as Dr. Suang (as Krerkkiat Punpiputt)
- Theeradanai Suwannahom as Tin

== Reception ==
Rob Nelson of Variety called the film "convoluted" and referred to "the upside-down point-of-view shots" as "gimmicky", and wrote that "the pic's pleasures remain almost solely in the cinematographic realm." Marc Savlov of The Austin Chronicle called the film "gorgeous to look at" and praised it for "[reinventing] the standard noir tropes", though he indicated a preference for Last Life in the Universe, a previous effort by director Ratanaruang.

== See also ==
- List of submissions to the 85th Academy Awards for Best Foreign Language Film
- List of Thai submissions for the Academy Award for Best Foreign Language Film
