= Super Robin Hood =

1986 video game

- Amstrad CPC cover art by Nigel Fletcher featuring the eponymous hero
- Developer: Oliver Twins
- Publisher: Codemasters
- Composers: Jon Paul Eldridge (Amstrad CPC); David Whittaker (ZX Spectrum); Allister Brimble (Legend Quest)
- Platforms: Amstrad CPC, ZX Spectrum, Commodore 64, Atari ST, Amiga, NES
- Release: November 1986 (Super Robin Hood); January 1993 (Legend Quest)
- Genre: Platform
- Mode: Single-player

Super Robin Hood is a 1986 platform game developed by brothers Andrew and Philip Oliver and published by Codemasters as a budget title for home computers in the United Kingdom. Based on the folklore of Robin Hood, the game takes place in the Sheriff of Nottingham's castle where Maid Marian is held captive. The player controls the eponymous hero, encountering enemies and navigating through the castle's ladders and platforms to rescue Marian.

After graduating secondary school, the developers devised the game's concept to solicit publishers at the 1986 Personal Computer World Show. The Oliver twins met the Darling brothers, who had just founded Codemasters, at the trade event and struck a deal. Originally developed for Amstrad CPC computers, the game was ported to Commodore and Spectrum platforms soon after. Years later, the Oliver twins recreated the game for the Nintendo Entertainment System as part of their foray into the North American market. Issues with Nintendo delayed publication, however; it was eventually released in the Quattro Adventure compilation in 1993. Codemasters also ported the NES version to 16-bit home computers as Robin Hood: Legend Quest.

Video game publications praised Super Robin Hood for its value as a budget title while its gameplay and presentation received a mixed response. The game sold well enough for the Oliver twins, who received royalties per unit, to invest in their company and pursue video game development as a career. The success sparked a long time partnership with Codemasters. The Darling brothers immediately requested a second title; the twins reused the game's engine to create Ghost Hunters in 1987. While Robin Hood: Legend Quest received a better critical response, it did not sell as well in a home computer market that had begun to shrink.

== Gameplay ==
The player must defeat or avoid the castle enemies while climbing ladders and jumping from platforms. The game score and player character health are tracked at the bottom. The Amstrad CPC version (pictured) includes a border to the left of the gameplay section depicting the titular hero.

Super Robin Hood is an action platform game in which the player navigates Robin Hood through the Sheriff of Nottingham's castle to rescue Maid Marian. The medieval castle, which is populated with enemies like archers and spiders, consists of a large labyrinthine space visually divided into several floors with moving platforms and ladders. The player navigates the castle via flip-screening, viewing a fixed screen-sized area at a time. In later versions, this was changed to a side-scrolling view of each floor. Collectable items within the castle consist of tablets, which replenish health, red hearts, which provide a point bonus, and keys, which activate platforms in the castle that allow further progress. The player must collect all the red hearts to be able to free Marian.

To traverse the castle, the player can make Robin walk, jump, climb, and duck. Enemies can be defeated by attacking with Robin's bow and arrows. The player earns points by defeating enemies and obtaining collectables. In the later re-release, each castle floor has a visual theme representing different areas. The lower dungeons have rocky walls whereas middle floors include castle spaces like banquet halls, living rooms, and bedchambers. The higher levels consists of fortified towers, including the final room where Maid Marian is held captive.

== Development and release ==
During their secondary school years, Andrew and Philip Oliver had developed several video games as a hobby, some of which were published. After completing their Advanced Level examinations, the twins had committed to studying electrical engineering in higher education. During an advising meeting, however, the two expressed their desire to create computer games rather than pursue post-secondary education. The brothers' advisor, Terry Hall, recommended to their parents that the twins take a year off to "get it out of their system." Their parents, Malcolm and Jenny Oliver, agreed with the stipulation that Andrew and Philip aim to seriously operate as a business; their father, also stated they could forego college if the two could generate a successful income. Through the United Kingdom's Enterprise Allowance Scheme, the Oliver twins set up a company, Complex Computer Software, to develop video games.

The developers derived the game's characters and premise from the English folklore of Robin Hood. Pictured from left to right are Maid Marian, the Sheriff of Nottingham, and Robin Hood.

Planning to attend the Personal Computer World trade show in September 1986, the pair began brainstorming ideas to pitch to publishers. Seeing the success of the 1984 Ghostbusters game, Andrew and Philip reasoned that a high profile name was needed in order to sell enough copies to have a sustainable business. Realising they could not afford to license anything, the twins thought of using the public domain Robin Hood character after watching the Robin of Sherwood TV show. Additionally, the character's folklore provided a basic plot. Building on the idea, they conceived a castle setting where the player rescues Maid Marian and steals the castle's riches. The brothers also reasoned that Robin's arrows would be more visible projectiles that allow for better gameplay interactions and have less "negative political baggage" than guns.

Andrew and Philip travelled to London to attend the Personal Computer World Show at the Olympia exhibition complex. They arranged meetings with several publishers to pitch their Robin Hood game and explored the convention centre to meet new publishers. Among those attending were Richard and David Darling, who after developing games for Mastertronic, founded their own publishing company: Codemasters. After showing the Darling brothers their portfolio, the Oliver twins presented their Robin Hood game designs and solicited an asking price. David Darling offered £10,000 (equivalent to £30,549.45 in 2024), which the twins described in retrospect as stunning compared to their previous programming earnings. Andrew and Philip verbally agreed and promised the game in a month in order to publish it ahead of the Christmas season.

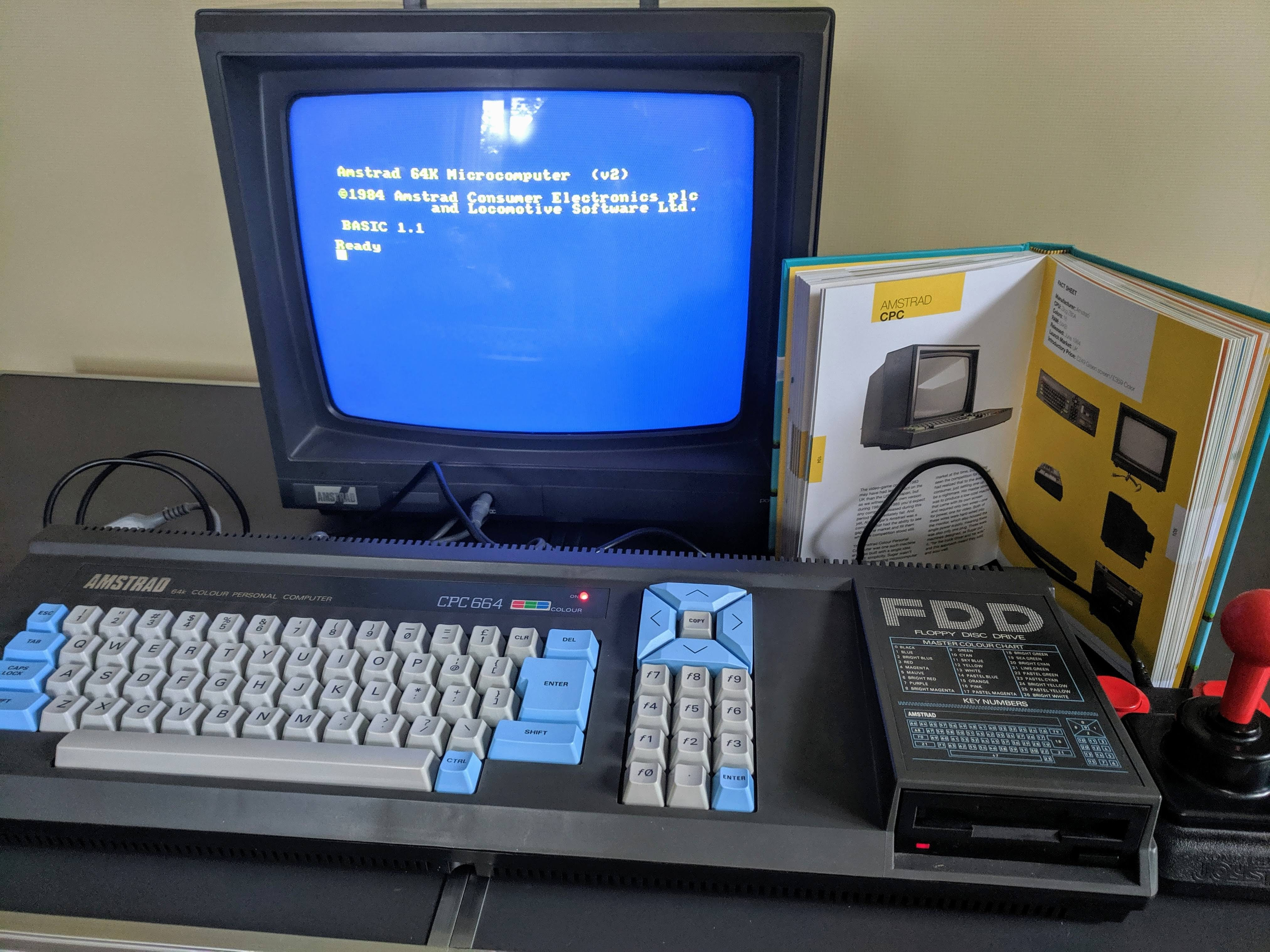
The Oliver twins programmed Super Robin Hood on an Amstrad CPC 664 computer (pictured), which they used 23 hours every day to meet the publishing deadline.

The two programmed the game in their bedroom, sharing an Amstrad CPC 664 computer. To meet the deadline, the twins used the computer 23 hours a day every day of the week, taking two 30 minute breaks daily to prevent the computer from overheating. Both brothers adopted a schedule with partially overlapped 18 hour shifts that included eating while they worked and writing code on paper when the other was using the computer. To expedite the development, the twins used Panda Sprites, a graphical software package they had recently created, to quickly draw game sprites that could be imported into their game programme.

Inspired by the 1982 Monsters and 1983 Chuckie Egg on the BBC Micro, the brothers implemented a side-view game design involving ladders and platforms. Unsure how big to make the game's castle, they fit as many rooms as the available memory could hold and then created a map editor to place various sprites into the map. The two would adjust the locations of the sprites to improve the gameplay and saved the map data as they designed the castle. This process allowed them to create a playable prototype that they could easily update and expand. To encourage exploration, the pair omitted linear progression via levels in order to allow the player to move freely around the map. They felt the backtracking emulated a maze and extended the gameplay. A health gauge was added to reduce the number of times the character dies; the health mechanic also provided motivation to search for health tablets in the castle.

The pair's neighbourhood friend, Jon Paul Eldridge, provided audio for the game. Eldridge had learned to code with Andrew and Paul growing up; he eventually branched off to write music and sound effects for video games. After the Oliver twins heard his work, the three began to collaborate on projects. Andrew and Philip included voice synthesis in the game to make it stand out, which was advertised on the cover art. Their mother recorded the lines for Maid Marian at their home. She recited the phrases into a microphone connected to the pair's computer.

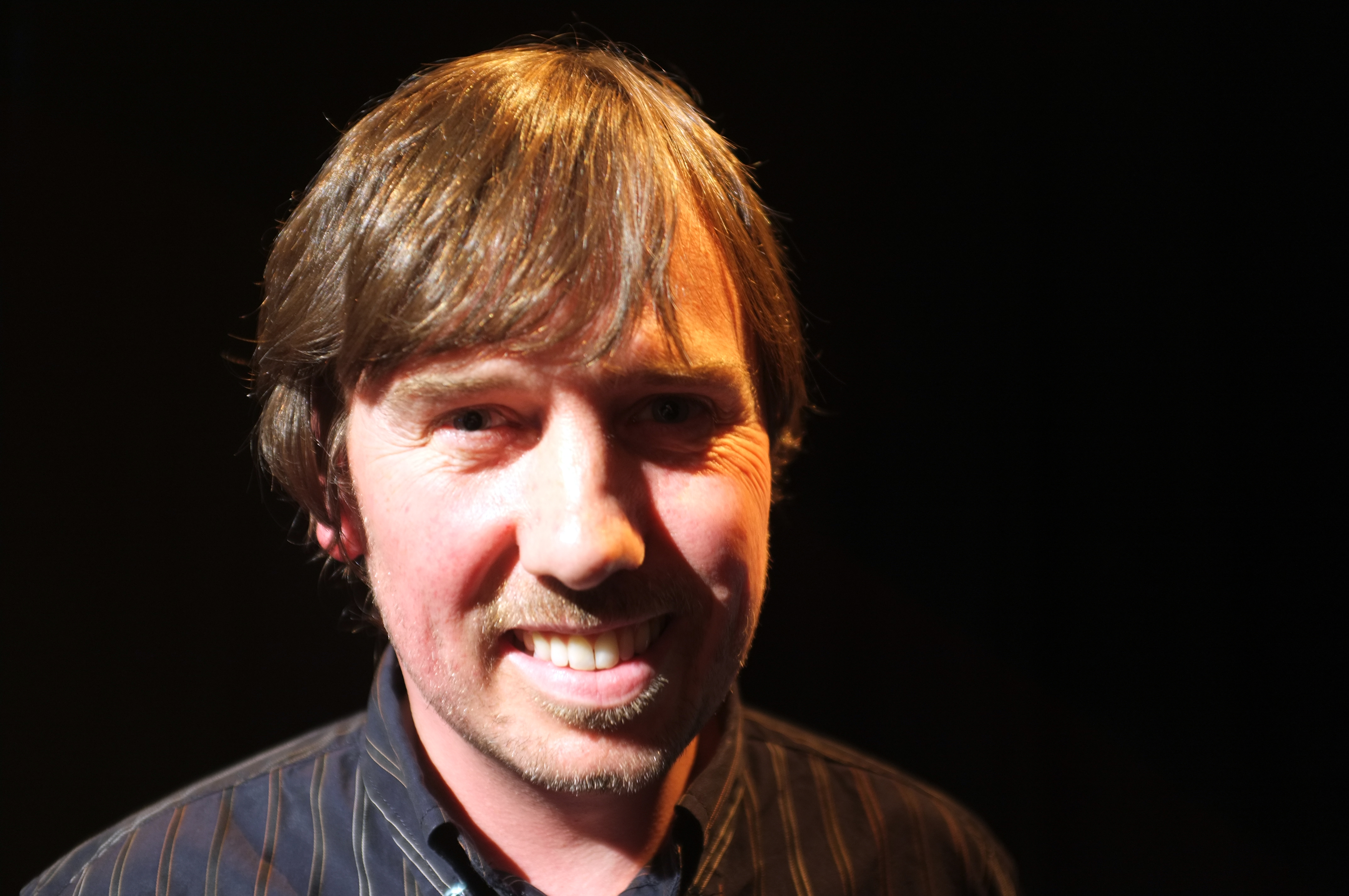
Upon completion, David Darling (shown in 2012) and his brother Richard offered the Oliver twins a publishing contract with royalties per unit sold of Super Robin Hood.

When the two brought the finished game to Codemasters, the Darling brothers reacted positively; however, they offered a contract different from the verbal agreement a month ago: a first production run of 20,000 units with a payment of 13.5p per copy sold. While initially disappointed, the Oliver twins still consider it a good deal and signed the publishing contract. Codemasters then published the game within a fortnight in November 1986. The Darling brothers added "Super" to the title to "spice it up a bit;" the Oliver twins believed it made the title feel more special. Nigel Fletcher designed the cassette J-card as well as the cover artwork. As part of its "budget-game" marketing strategy, the company included four game screenshots on the back cover to provide customers an accurate preview.

Codemasters then ported the game to the Spectrum and Commodore 64 platforms. The Oliver twins received an additional 5p per copy sold of the ports. The pair began developing their next game, Ghost Hunters, while other programmers were hired to convert Super Robin Hood. Mark Baldock converted the game to Spectrum computers. David Whittaker handled the audio. Codemasters later re-released Super Robin Hood on a compilation CD for Spectrum and Commodore computers in 1990. In 1993, it was included in another Codemasters anthology, Smash 16 Arcade Hits. Decades later, the game was made available on the Antstream Arcade gaming platform. The ZX Spectrum port was released first in March 2021; the Commodore 64 version followed later.

=== Nintendo Entertainment System remake ===
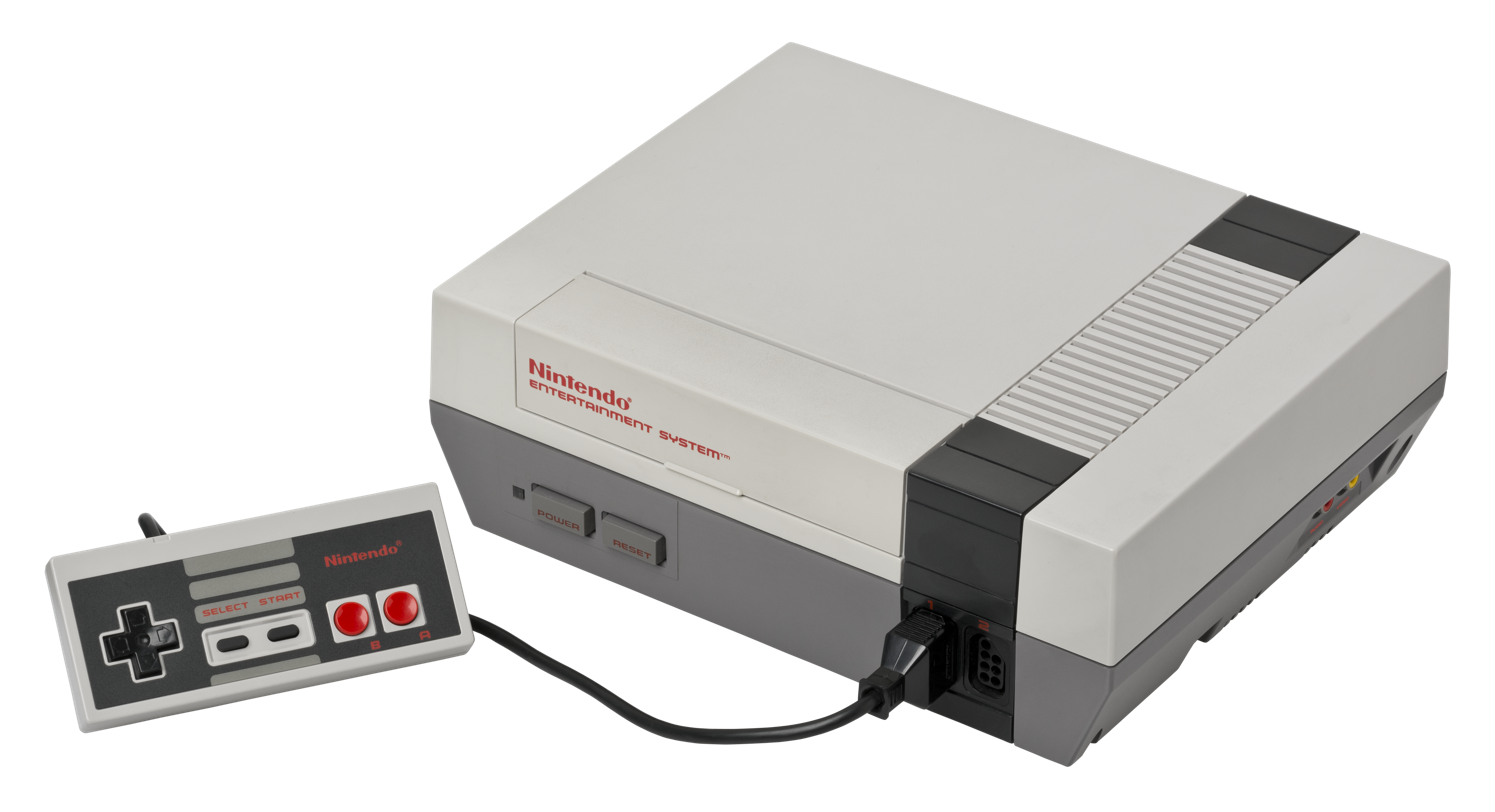
The Oliver twins began developing on the Nintendo Entertainment System (pictured) in order to tap into the North American video game market.

Codemasters had signed a distribution deal with Canadian company Camerica to sell Nintendo Entertainment System (NES) titles in the United States and Canada; as a result, Codemasters needed games to release. The twins saw the North American region as an untapped market and began releasing several games on the console as part of the deal. Although they began developing for the console late into the system's lifecycle, the brothers continued NES development because of the newfound success.

In 1991, they decided to recreate Super Robin Hood for the NES. They believed making another Nintendo title would be quick based on their experience coding Fantastic Dizzy the year before. As their life circumstances had changed, however, development took longer than anticipated and lasted from September 1991 through April 1992. Additional motivation was that NES development costs were lower than switching to 16-bit systems and they liked the console's anti-piracy features. Furthermore, the Oliver twins felt comfortable with the NES's hardware, which uses a custom 8-bit 6502 chip, because they had experience working with the 6502 microprocessor from developing Commodore 64 titles. The developers later said that the quality standard to meet was higher for NES games because they use cartridge media; replacing cartridges due to errors was cost prohibitive compared to cassette games.

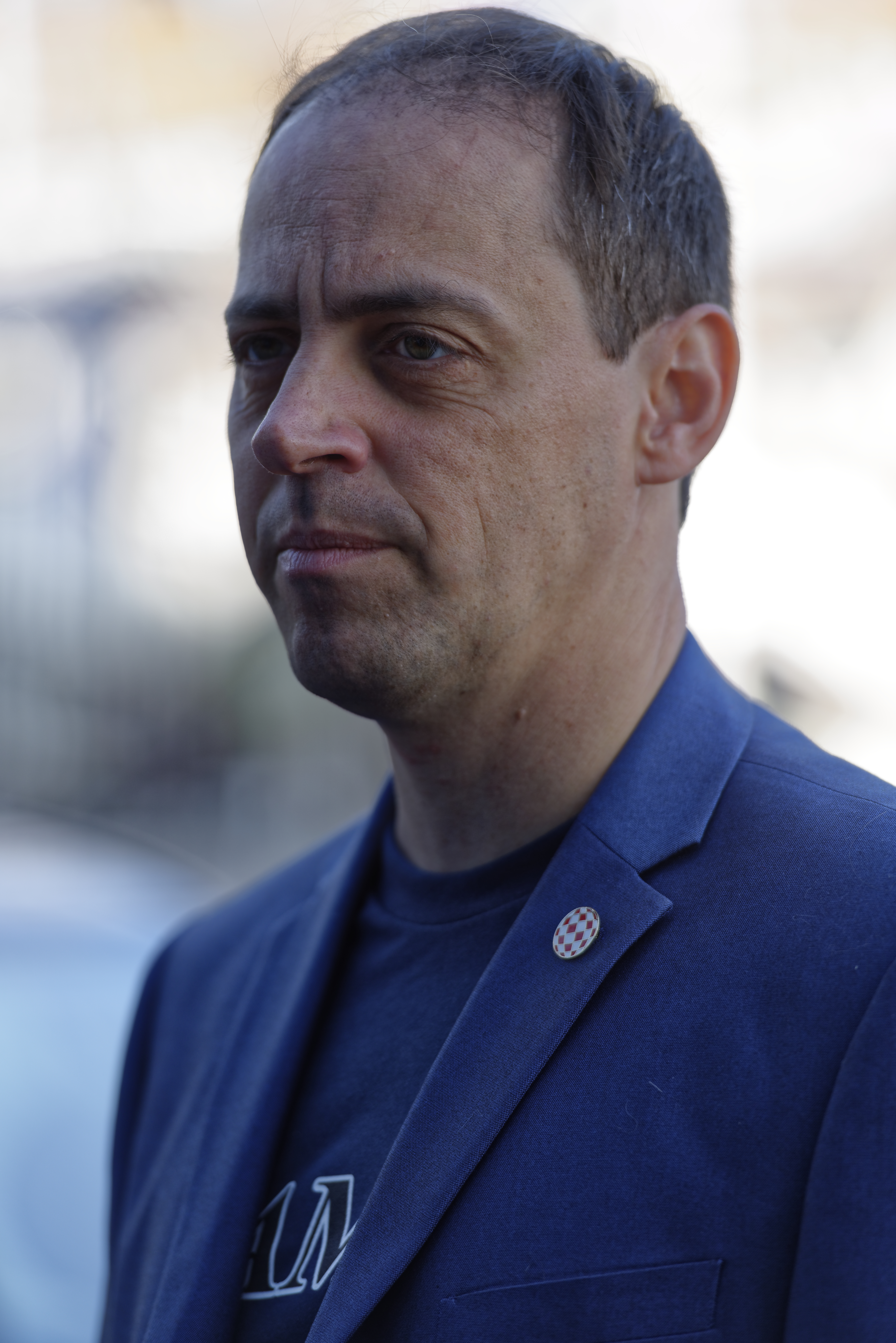
Because they lacked a musical background, the Oliver twins hired Allister Brimble (shown in 2015) to compose the remake's audio.

The NES remake uses a 64kB ROM cartridge that includes 8kB RAM for redefining sets of graphics. The twins' development environment consisted of two 8086 computers with Programmer Development System (PDS) cards. Cables connected the PDS cards to special Codemasters NES Development Boards, which in turn were connected to retail NES consoles. The consoles were connected to a PAL and NTSC monitors to check compatibility with regional systems. The developers used a text editor and 6502 compiler on each computer to write the game's code. They used floppy disks to back up and transfer their work between the computers. To create the graphics, they used an Amiga 500 computer with Deluxe Paint III. Similar to the earlier version, the Oliver twins outsourced the game audio as they did not have a musical background. Allister Brimble created ten music tracks and over 20 sound effects based on the brothers' specifications. Gavin Raeburn wrote the music driver, which they used for all their NES games.

The pair redesigned the castle map, making it around 65 individual screens, and divided the world into nine different floors. They grouped the floors into three types in order to compress the map data's file size by sharing graphic sets among similar floors. The first group consists of the lower three castle dungeons, and the middle halls and bedrooms comprise the second group. The end screen, game's font, and upper floors and towers were combined into the third group. Each set has 256 sprites for the backgrounds. To add further variety, the brothers changed the graphics' colour palette between floors.

The remake's release after completion was delayed due to issues with Nintendo. (Note: At the time, Nintendo was in a legal battle with Camerica over the release of the Game Genie. Additionally, Camerica had circumvented Nintendo's quality control process.) Camerica eventually released Super Robin Hood as part of the four-pack compilation Quattro Adventure for the NES in November 1993. The company included an endorsement from its spokesperson, Thor Aackerlund, in marketing efforts. The NES version was later included in The Oliver Twins Collection cartridge for the Evercade line of consoles in 2020.

After completing the NES port, Andrew and Philip decided to re-release the game on 16-bit home computers in order to introduce it to a new generation of players. Since the game had already been released on home computers, they believed retaining the same name would be problematic. An early name was Super Robin Hood 2. During the process, the development team called the game Amazing Robin Hood, before Codemasters changed the name to Robin Hood: Legend Quest prior to release. While they aimed for a Christmas season release, project management issues at Codemasters delayed it until January 1993. The twins hired Lyndon Sharp to convert the game to the Amstrad and Spectrum platforms as well as Mark Bell and Damon Redmond for Atari ST and Amiga computers. Codemasters included a poster with the Amiga release. To promote the game, the company provided ST Action magazine an exclusive demo that was included with the February 1993 issue.

== Reception ==
Super Robin Hood Reception

Review scores
| Publication | Score |
|---|---|
| Amstrad Action | Amstrad: 85% |
| Crash | ZX: 52% |
| Your Sinclair | ZX: 6/10 |
| Amstrad Computer User | Amstrad: 14/20, 16/20, 17/20 |
| Commodore Force | C64: 58% |

By February 1987, the game had sold over 10,000 units. The sales of the game across all platforms earned the twins around £20,000 (equivalent to £57,916.67 in 2024). Video game magazines such as Amstrad Action praised the value of the game as a budget title but had a mixed response to the gameplay. The magazine's editor, Bob Wade, praised the gameplay for being easy to pick up and having a good sized world. While he rated the game high in the "grab factor" and "staying power" categories, Wade noted that the platforming action was "unoriginal" and the problems lacked variety, respectively. He summarised his review stating that it is a "very enjoyable game at a marvellous price." Three of Amstrad Computer User magazine's staff—Nigel, Liz, and Colin—overall viewed the game favourably, calling it "OK", a "jolly little game", and "enjoyable", respectively. Nigel rated the game the lowest of the three, noting that better platform games are available.

The ports also had a mixed reception but were rated less favourably. Your Sinclair's reviewer wrote that the Spectrum version's "easy scrolling action" was instantly appealing. While they noted more sophisticated platform games existed, the writer identified the lack of a timer as a positive that allowed for more constructive gameplay. Crash magazine's editors—Ricky, Ben, and Paul—were overall more critical of the Spectrum port. Ben disparaged the game's longevity and recommended against purchasing it. While Ricky lamented that "tired game ideas" like Super Robin Hood had become a "sad but regular occurrence," he noted that players with appropriate expectations would enjoy the game, especially for the budget price. Reviewing the Smash 16 compilation, Commodore Force's Miles Guttery compared the original Super Robin Hood negatively to the 16-bit remake. He criticised the gameplay, citing the damage taken from falls and the lack of a vertical jump.

Reactions to the game's presentation were generally positive, though with some dissenting opinions. Wade praised the graphics, calling the animations for the titular character delightful and complimenting the use of colours. He lauded the inclusion of speech synthesis as an "excellent feature", especially in a budget title, and described it as "very clear and varied". The Your Sinclair reviewer considered the game's "clear graphics" among its appeal. Conversely, Guttery was critical of the graphics, calling them "shoddy" with "dodgy animation". Two reviewers from Amstrad Computer User complimented the audiovisuals. Colin praised the animations and the voice overs. While she called the speech "adequate", Liz stated she liked the music. Crash's editors were split on the Spectrum version's visuals. While Paul and Ricky praised the presentation and graphics, Ben criticised them. Both Paul and Ben made special note of Whittaker's title music, calling it "great" and "nice", respectively.

The game has received a positive retrospective reception decades after its release as well. Retro Gamer staff considered Super Robin Hood one of the Oliver twins' best five games and a great first title for Codemasters, citing its audiovisuals, premise, and gameplay. They further noted that the Legend Quest version was "equally brilliant". Stuart Hunt of Retro Gamer called it a "brilliant platformer" that was among the better budget games. He considered the "fantastic" music as the stand out element but criticised the game map's design, calling it "mind-bending" to navigate. Video game journalists Chris Wilkins and Roger Kean noted that Super Robin Hood has since become a favourite Codemasters title among collectors.

=== Remake ===
Robin Hood: Legend Quest Reception

Review scores
| Publication | Score |
|---|---|
| Amiga Power | Amiga: 50% |
| Amstrad Action | Amstrad: 79% |
| Sinclair User | ZX: 89% |
| ST Action | Atari ST: 88% |
| Commodore Force | C64: 81% |
| N-Force | NES: 82% |
| The One Amiga | Amiga: 73% |

Super Robin Hood's inclusion in Quattro Adventure as well as the compilation's value was well received. A reviewer for GamePro magazine called it the "star" of the collection, stating that it could have easily stood on its own as a separate release. He praised Super Robin Hood's audiovisuals as the best of the four titles. However, the reviewer criticised a lack of features, such as saving and better graphics, attributing this to limited memory on the NES game cartridge. N-Force magazine's reviewers, writing under the pseudonyms Shades and Ace, lauded the value of the collection, with Ace calling it "a whole lotta fun at a bargain price." He praised the colourful graphics. While Shades noted Aackerlund's endorsement and described Super Robin Hood as enjoyable, he commented that the "slightly obscure gameplay" is a hindrance to the game's playability. He rated it the second highest score of the four titles, summarising his review by calling it a "classic style collect-'em-up". Rich Pelley of Your Sinclair praised the value, calling it a bargain. He considered Super Robin Hood one of the better titles on the compilation and among his favourite budget games despite its age.

The 16-bit ports received overall positive reviews but did not sell many units. Philip Oliver attributed Legend Quest's low sales to the diminished markets for the Spectrum and Amstrad home computers. Jon Pillar of Amstrad Action praised the gameplay controls for maintaining the game's flow, specifically being able to fire arrows while moving and to change the character's direction in a jump. He summarised his review praising the game for its addictive platforming but expressed dismay that the Amstrad did not receive a proper conversion. Commodore Force magazine's two reviewers, Miles Guttery and Chris Hayward, praised several aspects of the Commodore 64 port. Despite there being a large selection of platformers on the system, they noted that Legend Quest has a "certain spark" that helps it stand out. Sinclair User's editor, Alan Dykes, expressed excitement that an NES game was successfully converted to the Spectrum and concluded his review calling the it "refreshing" and "enjoyable". Staff for ST Action magazine called the Atari ST version "fun" and suitable for beginners as well as platform game fans. While he considered Legend Quest an inferior copy of the 1991 platform game Gods, The One Amiga's reviewer, Simon Byron, praised the intuitive gameplay. He summarised his review noting that the game is a good budget title despite its lack of polish compared to full-price games. Linda Barker of Amiga Power was more critical of the Amiga release, noting that it did not hold her attention.

Critics had a mixed response to the visuals. While he praised the presentation's polish, Pillar criticised the lack of colour and "jerky" screen movement; he attributed this to the game being developed for the Spectrum and then ported to the Amstrad. For the Amiga release, Byron bemoaned the game's "atrocious" scrolling effect and Barker called the animations stiff. While Guttery and Hayward described Robin's animations as "great" and "superb", the reviewers criticised the enemies' appearances and noted that the backgrounds look "dull" at times. Dykes praised the Spectrum version's presentation and visuals.

== Legacy ==
The brothers used the money they earned from Super Robin Hood's profits to purchase a second Amstrad CPC computer with a Maxam ROM, so they could write code simultaneously. The game's success was the beginning of a regular partnership between the Oliver twins and Codemasters. The Darling brothers requested another game soon after, and the twins reused the game design from Super Robin Hood to create a spiritual sequel with two-player gameplay: Ghost Hunters. The pair also continued working with Eldridge on their Codemasters games.
