= Timeline (2014 film) =

- Film poster
- Directed by: Nonzee Nimibutr
- Screenplay by: Kiat Songsanant
- Story by: Nonzee Nimibutr
- Produced by: Somsak Techaratanaprasert
- Starring: Jirayu Tangsrisuk; Jarinporn Joonkiat; Piyatida Mitteeraroj; Noppachai Chaiyanam
- Cinematography: Teerawat Rujintham
- Edited by: Fullhouse Production
- Music by: Chatchai Pongprapapan
- Distributed by: Sahamongkol Film International
- Release date: 13 February 2014
- Running time: 135 minutes
- Country: Thailand
- Language: Thai
- Box office: 51.8 million Baht

Timeline (Thai: Timeline จดหมาย ความทรงจำ) is a 2014 Thai romantic-comedy-drama film directed by Nonzee Nimibutr and distributed by Sahamongkol Film. It is a sequel to the 2004 film The Letter. The film grossed 51.8 million baht.

== Plot ==
Tan (Jirayu Tangsrisuk) is a teenager who wanted to experience the outside world. He lives in Chiang Mai with his mother but he is bored with his life, therefore he determines to study in Bangkok.

Life in the new world, with all new things around and different from the old world, causes "Tan" to meet "June"(Jarinporn Joonkiat) a new friend that has a different way of thinking and looking at the world. She is the only who supports him in hisendeavors and gives him inspiration. But Tan falls in love with June's sister, Orn. June decides to continue her further studies in Japan.

She can't accept it because Tan and her sister are the one that she loves. Later, Tan breaks up with Orn. Then, he writes a letter to June expressing his love. He knows that he loves her but it is too late. She dies after she gets the letter from Tan. By accident, she drowns when she tries to help a Japanese boy. Tan is broken hearted. He decides to do what June wanted to do, which is to travel around the world.

== Cast ==
- Jirayu Tangsrisuk as Tan
- Jarinporn Joonkiat as June
- Piyatida Mitteeraroj as Mut
- Noppachai Chaiyanam as Wat
- Adisorn Aadtakit as Tun
- Aratee Tunmahapan as Orn
- Chayapon Panhakan as Pang
- Yongsin Wongpanitnont as Tan (childhood)
- Chanikarn Tangkabodee as June (childhood)
- Weerayut Chanthasu as Nont
- Phatthanon Channgern as Boripat Wantanaworpol

== Soundtrack ==
- "How Much Further is Near?" (ไกลแค่ไหนคือใกล้) by Jirayu Tangsrisuk / Jarinporn Joonkiat
- "The question that no answer" (คำถามซึ้งไร้คำตอบ) by Jirayu Tangsrisuk
