= The Library (film) =

- Film poster
- Thai: ห้องสมุดแห่งรัก
- Directed by: Nattawut Poonpiriya
- Written by: Nattawut Poonpiriya
- Produced by: Ratchapol Chitpuengtham; Prawit Jensukum; Amorn Nilthep
- Starring: Ananda Everingham; Selina Wiesmann; Niti Chaichitatorn
- Cinematography: Phaklao Jiraungkoonkun
- Edited by: Chonlasit Upanigkit
- Music by: Kevin Macleod; Peter Rudenko
- Production companies: Mono Music; Super Uber Film
- Distributed by: Mono Music
- Release date: 29 August 2013
- Running time: 30 minutes
- Country: Thailand
- Language: Thai

The Library (Thai: ห้องสมุดแห่งรัก; lit: Library of Love) is a Thai short film released in 2013.

== Summary ==
Jim uses the library where Ann work as a librarian. Jim secretly falls in love with Ann at first sight, but the library rule "Please Quiet" prohibits Jim from talking to Ann. He starts writing letters to Ann on the lending cards of the books he borrowed, without Ann's knowledge. When Jim's ex returns the last book he borrowed, Ann hears that Jim died of liver cancer. As she starts crying with the book in her hand one of her tears fall onto the card causing her to notice the letter written on the other side.

- Nutcha

== Production and release ==
The Library is a short film produced by Mono Music (in a network of Mono Group) and released on August 29, 2013 at 05:00pm on Zaa Network (present MONO29).

== Original soundtrack ==
Yak Hai Kwam Kid Mee Siang (อยากให้ความคิดมีเสียง; "Silent Thought") by Lakkana Huangmaneerungroj.
