= Countdown (2012 film) =

2012 film

- Release poster
- Directed by: Nattawut Poonpiriya
- Written by: Nattawut Poonpiriya
- Produced by: Jira Maligool; Vanridee Pongsittisak
- Starring: Pachara Chirathivat; Jarinporn Joonkiat; Pattarasaya Kreuasuwansri; David Asavanond
- Cinematography: Niramon Ross
- Edited by: Panayu Kunvanlee
- Music by: Hualampong Riddim
- Production company: Jor Kwang Films
- Distributed by: GTH
- Release date: 20 December 2012
- Running time: 90 minutes
- Country: Thailand
- Language: Thai

Countdown (Thai: เคาท์ดาวน์) is a 2012 Thai thriller film written and directed by Nattawut Poonpiriya. The film was selected as the Thai entry for the Best Foreign Language Film at the 86th Academy Awards, but it was not nominated. The film was remade in 2015 in India in Kannada as Ring Master.

== Plot summary ==
Three Thai teenagers living in New York City plan a New Year's Eve celebration in their apartment. They contact a drug dealer named Jesus to deliver items for the party. His visit leads to a series of events that change their plans.

== Cast ==
- Pachara Chirathivat as Jack
- Jarinporn Joonkiat as Bee
- Pattarasaya Kreuasuwansri as Pam
- David Asavanond as Jesus
- Lorenzo de Stefano as Fabio

== See also ==
- List of submissions to the 86th Academy Awards for Best Foreign Language Film
- List of Thai submissions for the Academy Award for Best Foreign Language Film
