= Ghostbusters (disambiguation) =

Ghostbusters is a 1984 film directed by Ivan Reitman.

Ghostbusters or Ghost Busters may also refer to:

== Arts and media ==
- Ghostbusters (franchise), the media franchise following the 1984 film
  - Ghostbusters, the 1984 original film
  - The Real Ghostbusters, a 1986 cartoon sequel to the original film
  - Ghostbusters II, the 1989 sequel to the original film
  - Extreme Ghostbusters, a 1997 cartoon sequel to The Real Ghostbusters
  - Ghostbusters (2016 film), a 2016 reboot of the original film
  - Ghostbusters: Afterlife, 2021 film
  - Ghostbusters: Frozen Empire, 2024 film
  - Ghostbusters (1984 soundtrack), the soundtrack for the first film
    - "Ghostbusters" (song), the main theme for the films written by Ray Parker Jr.
  - Ghostbusters (role-playing game), a tabletop role-playing game
  - Ghostbusters (1984 video game), a 1984 game based on the first film
  - Ghostbusters (1990 video game), a 1990 video game inspired by the first two films
  - Ghostbusters: The Video Game, a 2009 video game loosely based on the proposed Ghostbusters III script
  - Ghostbusters (2013 video game), a discontinued 2013 mobile game for iOS and Android
  - Ghostbusters (comics), various comic book series based on the property
- The Ghost Busters, a 1970s live action TV series by Filmation
  - Ghostbusters (1986 TV series), a 1980s cartoon sequel to the live action TV series
- Ghost Busters, the working title of the 1946 film Spook Busters
- "Ghostbusters", The Keith & Paddy Picture Show season 1, episode 2 (2017)

== Other uses ==
- "Ghostbuster", the finishing move of professional wrestler Koko B. Ware

== See also ==
- Ghosthunter (disambiguation)
