= Raeng Ngao =

- Genre: Drama, Revenge, Romance
- Country of origin: Thailand
- Original language: Thai

Original release
- Network: Channel 3
- Release: 2012

Raeng Ngao (Thai: แรงเงา) is a Thai film and drama-revenge lakhon which has aired on Channel 3. Since 1986 the story proved popular and has been subject to four remakes.

== Synopsis ==
The story revolves around a young woman named Mutta (มุตตา), the naive and kind-hearted twin sister of Munin (มุนินทร์), who goes to Bangkok to find a job. There she meets Vikit (วีกิจ) who later becomes her co-worker at the same company. Vikit and Mutta become friends, but Vikit develops romantic feelings which Mutta did not return, leaving Vikit heartbroken. However when she meets her boss Chenphop (เจนภพ) she falls in love with him despite him being a vain and shallow womanizer, already having a wife and three children - also being Vikit's uncle.

When Chenphop's wife Nopnapha (นพนภา) finds out that her husband is having an affair with Mutta, she publicly humiliates Mutta in front of her co-workers and forces her husband to stop seeing her. Mutta realizing that her lover would not stand for her, leaves going back to the countryside. She falls into a deep depression after also finding out that she was pregnant from Chenphop and eventually commits suicide in her home town.

On that same day she commits suicide her elder twin sister Munin arrives back home from the United States where she had been studying. She was the one who discovers Mutta hanging from the ceiling on returning and rushes her to hospital where Mutta dies. Munin blames herself for having been one of the causes of her sister's death, not only from coming home too late but from their rocky relationship and conflicting personalities. Munin always resented Mutta's gentle, sweet and likeable personality which she believed made people prefer Mutta to herself. Munin therefore became the outspoken, rebellious and more brash of the two sisters and worked hard in school to score a scholarship to the United States to escape her sister who she envied.

Munin upon returning from the hospital reads Mutta's diary and discovers the truth behind her suicide. Upon realising that no-one in Bangkok knows about Mutta's death she decides to return to Mutta's workplace using her identical looks to exact revenge from those she perceived had wronged her sister. Thus she went to Bangkok and pretends to be Mutta.

== Remakes ==
The original lakhon aired in 1986 under the name Raeng Heung (แรงหึง). Owing to its success there were further remakes in 1988 (แรงหึง), 2001 (แรงเงา) and 2012 (แรงเงา).

=== Raeng Heung (Film) (1986) ===
- No. of episodes:
- Opening theme:
- Running time:
- Cast:

Chintara Sukapatana - Munin/Mutta
Amphol Lumpoon - Vikit
Kriangkrai Unhanandana - Chenphop
Yani Chongwisut - Napha
Natani Sitthisaman
Amnuwai Sirichant
Narasee Na Bangchang

=== Raeng Heung (1988) ===
- No. of episodes:
- Opening theme:
- Running time:
- Director: Adul Duyarat
- Cast:

Jariya Anfone - Munin/Mutta
Trin Sestachok - Vikit
Noppol Gomarachun - Chenphop
Mayura Savetsila - Napha
Panan Na Phatthalung - Kaew
Ratri Witthawat - Netnaphis
Sommat Phraihiran

=== RangNgao (2001) ===
- No. of episodes: 14 (2001-2001)
- Opening theme: Wan Nan by Nui Nuttikarn
- Running time: Friday, Saturday and Sunday - 8:20 pm
- Cast:

Ann Thongprasom - Munin/Mutta Chongprasoet

Theeradej Wongpuapan - Vikit
Dodo Charnlekha - Chenphop
Sawitree Samipak - Napha
Top Pohpiti

=== RangNgao (2012) ===
- No. of episodes: 20 (Monday October 1, 2012 - Tuesday December 4, 2012)
- Opening theme: "Ngao Tee Mee Hua Jai" by Mint Mintita Wattanakul
- Running time: 135 mins/episode UTC+7(8.30pm - 10.45pm)= UTC+8(21:30-23:40)
- Cast:

Janie Tienphosuwan - Munin/Mutta Chongsawat
Phupoom Phongpanu - Vikit Aphibanbodin
Ravit Terdwong - Chenpop Aphibanbodin
Tanyares Ramnarong - Nopnapha Apibanbodin
Jane Janesuda Parnto - Netnaphit
Mintita Wattanakul - Looksorn
Chonticha Nuamsukol - Ratchanok
Rita Ramnarong - Tong
Pitchapat Tunta - Tor
Puttachart Pongsuchart - Jangjit
Lilly McGrath - Orrapim
Alita Blatter - Tip-arpa
Sueangsuda Lawanprasert - Soikham Aphibanbodin

== See also ==
- Phi Tai Hong
