= Confessions of a Shaman =

- คำสารภาพของหมอผี
- Directed by: Natthanon Cholumpi
- Written by: Rapeepimol Chaiyasena; Sakchai Kiatpanya-Opas; Nattapol Klaipal
- Based on: Confessions of a Shaman by Kru Tree
- Starring: Teeradetch Metawarayut; Shahkrit Yamnam; Denise Jelilcha Kapaun
- Cinematography: Jirayut Kaewtabtim
- Production companies: M Studio; The Ghost Radio; Media Intelligence Group (MI Group)
- Distributed by: M Studio
- Release date: August 12, 2026
- Running time: 126 minutes
- Country: Thailand
- Language: Thai
- Box office: ฿102.42 million (Bangkok, Metropolitan & Chiang Mai) ฿258.41 million (nationwide)

Confessions of a Shaman (Thai: คำสารภาพของหมอผี) is a 2026 Thai supernatural horror film starring Teeradetch Metawarayut, Shahkrit Yamnam, Denise Jelilcha Kapaun. It is directed by Natthanon Cholumpi.

== Premise ==
When life's storms leave Tor with nowhere to turn and the law offers no justice, he decides to leave the monkhood and turn his back on the Buddhist faith. He descends into the underworld, making a pact with Tian, a powerful shaman, to learn black magic and raise a vengeful ghost to exact revenge on the wicked. But the deeper Tor ventures into the occult, the more its dark forces begin to consume him, eventually revealing a horrifying secret hidden behind the shaman's school, one that comes at a price far greater than he could ever have imagined.

== Cast ==
- Teeradetch Metawarayut as Tor
- Shahkrit Yamnam as Tian
- Denise Jelilcha Kapaun as Mali
- Amarin Nitibhon as Kob
- Ranya Siyanon as Noi
- Wayne Folconer as Sak
- Chalad Na Songkhla as Monk
- Warintorn Panhakarn as Cameraman (guest)
- Kunpimook Bhuwakul as Yos (cameo)

== Production ==
Confessions of a Shaman is the second film to be adapted from a ghost story featured on the popular radio program The Ghost Radio, hosted by Watcharapol "Jack The Ghost" Fueangjaidee. It follows Our House, which was released in late 2022. The film is based on a story of the same name told by Kru Tree, which has garnered as many as 7 million views on YouTube. The film is a collaboration between M Studio, Media Intelligence Group (MI Group), The Ghost Radio, and Cholumpi Production.

The film's official commencement ceremony was held at the Bangkok City Pillar Shrine on December 1, 2025, and filming began later that same month.

== Release and reception ==
The gala premiere of Confessions of a Shaman was held on August 10, 2026, one day before its nationwide release, at the G Floor, Parade Square zone of One Bangkok, with the cast and crew in attendance. It was released in several premium formats, including IMAX, 4DX, Dolby Atmos, and IMAX with Laser 2D.

The film was released nationwide on Wednesday, August 12, 2026. It grossed more than 15 million baht within its first half-day and earned 30 million baht on its nationwide opening day, making it the highest-grossing Thai film opening of the year.

After four and a half days in theaters, the film's box office revenue surpassed 100 million baht.
