= Mintita Wattanakul =

Thai actress and singer (born 1988)

- มิณฑิตา วัฒนกุล
- Born: 22 February 1988 (age 38); Bangkok, Thailand
- Education: Faculty of Economics Chulalongkorn University
- Occupations: Singer; actress; host
- Years active: 2006–present
- Agent(s): Broadcast Thai Television (2012–2023)
- Parents: Kowit Wattanakul (father); Wassana Wattanakul (mother)
- Musical career
- Also known as: Mint AF3 (มิ้น เอเอฟ3)
- Genres: Pop; R&B
- Instrument: Vocals
- Label: True Fantasia (2006–2011)

Signature
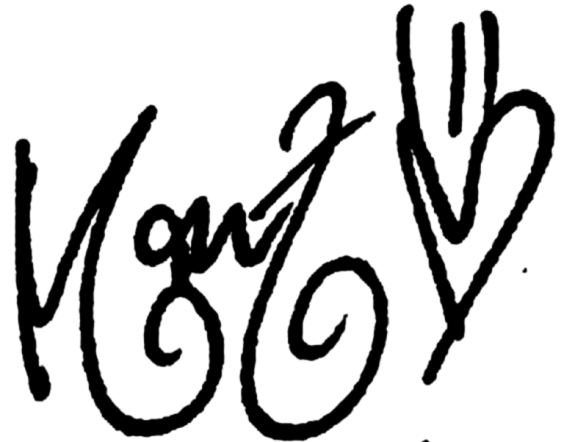

Mintita Wattanakul (Thai: มิณฑิตา วัฒนกุล; born 22 February 1988, in Thailand), nickname Mint (Thai: มิ้น), is a Thai singer and actress, She is known for her roles in Formosa Betrayed (2009), My Valentine (2010), The Cupids Series (2017) and My Secret Bride (2019).

== Biography ==
=== Personal life ===
Wattanakul attended kindergarten at Chatchalerm Kindergarten before starting her primary education at Daru Nothayan School (General Department). She went on to secondary education at Bodindecha (Sing Singhaseni) School (B.D.34) and graduated from Chulalongkorn University with a Bachelor's degree from the Faculty of Economics in 2011.

=== Career ===
In 2006, Mintita applied to compete in the singing contest of the reality TV show, True Academy Fantasia Season 3 (which at that time was still UBC Academy Fantasia), with the identification code as V5 and received the 3rd runner up award. After finishing the competition from True Academy Fantasia Season 3, Mintita signed as an artist under True Fantasia for 5 years. In 2007, Mintita became a member of 7 สาวสะบัดโชว์ (7 Sao Sabud Show), and released a Luk Thung 7 Sao Sabud Show album. In 2009, 7 Sao Sabud Show, changed their name to G2G, and released a Girlz to Go album in 2010.

After the expiration of the 5-year contract with True Fantasia, Mintita did not renew the contract.

In 2012, Mintita signed a contract to become an actress under Broadcast Thai Television Company Limited. Until 2023, she decided to become a freelance actress.

== Filmography ==
=== TV dramas ===
Year	Title	Role	Network
2008	Pah Loke Bunterng	Khantong	Channel 7
2010	Mongkut Dok Som	Kimlang	Channel 3
2012	Tom Yum Lum Sing	Joobjaeng	Channel 3
2012	Raeng Ngao	Looksorn	Channel 3
2013	Madam Dun	Noo-dok / Madam Fleur	Channel 3
2014	Dao Kiang Duen	Pat	Channel 3
2014	The Rising Sun : Roy Fun Tawan Duerd	Junko	Channel 3
2014	Wraith Mantra	Cha-wee	True4U
2015	Kol Kimono	Ai Miyakawa	Channel 3
2017	The Cupids Series	Cindy	Channel 3
2017	Yuttakarn Saladnor	Rosarin (Rose)	Workpoint TV
2019	Raeng Ngao 2	Looksorn	Channel 3
2019	Plara Song Krueng	Sandy	GMM 25
2019	Plerng Ruk Plerng Kaen	Pam	Channel 3
2019	My Secret Bride	Pol.Lt. Somruthai Sookkasem (Somsook) / Happy	Channel 3
2021	Eternal	Praeploy	Channel 3
2022	You are my Heartbeat	Rossarin	PPTV
2022	A Cunning Destiny	Pim-khwan	Channel 3
2023	You Touched My Heart	Sasita / Sita	Channel 3
2023	A Match by Maid	Gingkaew	Workpoint TV
2023	You Are My Universe	Somjeed	Channel 3
2023	To The Moon And Back	Dr. Tarn-mhok	Channel 3
2024	The Lady and Her Lovers	Dao	One 31, iQIYI
2024	The Scent of Hers	Lada	Workpoint TV, Netflix
2025	Rabbit on the Moon	Tiwa	One 31
2026	Girl Rules	Ant	GMM 25

=== Movies ===
Year	Title	Role	Notes
2006	Seasons Change		Cameo
2009	Formosa Betrayed	Maysing	
2010	My Valentine	Mind	

=== Sitcoms ===
Year	Title	Role	Network	Notes
2008–2016	Nong Mai Rai Borisut	Loykaew	Channel 3	
2012	Sa-ta-née Ruk Puk Rob	Meaw	Hay Ha (true visions 66)	
2013	Croissant Tumnong Ruk	Prim Primmarie	Channel 3	Cameo (episode: Luang Lub Tub Kae)
2026	Riak Chan Than Prathan	Apple	Youtube	EP9

=== Series ===
Year	Title	Role	Network	Notes
2011	Sin Chronicle	Waan	Channel 3	Episode: The choice
2013	Ruk Jing Ping Ker	Mai	Bang Channel	Episode: Choice
2015	Wifi Society	Ung-ing	One 31, Bang Channel	Episode: Because of You
2016	Lorn the series	View	MCOT HD	Ep.1 Ruk Luang Lorn
2017	THE SENSE	Aim	Channel 3	Episode: Karma online
2018	Behind The Sin The Series	Pim	Channel 3	Cameo (EP6)
2018	The Mirror	Waan	Channel 3	Episode: The choice
2020	Turn Left Turn Right	Nym	GMM 25	Cameo (EP3–7)
2021	I Need Romance TH	Preaw	true Asian Series, True4U, Netflix	
2023	Thank You Teacher	Pawinee	true Asian More, true ID	
2024	My Marvellous Dream is You	Minnie	Channel 3	
2025	Club Friday Theory of Love: No Such Thing as Coincidence	Prae	One 31	
2025	Mouse TH	Ornuma	true ID	
TBA	Girl Rules		GMM 25	

=== Musical theatres ===
Year	Title	Role
2007	AF The Musical, Ngern Ngern Ngern (Money Money Money)	Pa-radee (Toom)
2008	AF The Musical, Jojo-san	Jojo-san
2009	The legend of Reh Khai Fun Chaliang the musical	Puipui
2010	Restage The legend of Reh Khai Fun Chaliang the musical	Puipui
2011	R.U.R. Rossum's Universal Robot	Helena

=== Television show ===
Year	Title	Role	Network
2006	True Academy Fantasia Season 3	Contestant (V5)	true visions, true INSIDE, Modernine TV
2011–2012	Buddy VJ Girls Chat & New Year Special 2011	VJ	AF Channel
2013–2016	Bunterng 5 Nar 1	Host	Channel 5
2013	Talei Talai	Presenter (with Zara AF3)	true INSIDE
2013	Perd Loke Pipittapan Thai	Host	Channel 5
2014	Klai Cha-ngon	Host (with Paotong Tongjuer)	Thairath TV
2015	Kin Plian Chéewit Season 2	Host (with Ton Krissada)	true4U
2015	Siam Kids Pageant	Host	Channel 9
2017–2020	Kao Mai Kae	Host (with Heart Suthipongse)	Channel 5
2018	Shower Singer	Showertator (Commentator)	MCOT HD
2018	The Mask Line Thai	Contestant (Foi-thong)	Workpoint TV
2019–2021	Masterkey Rong Talom Dao	Member of Star Team	Channel 3
2021	Wow Bunterng	Host	Channel 5
2023	Menu Aojaow	Host	Channel 3
2025	AF is NOW	Host (with Puifaii Natapat and Ton Thanasit)	true visions Now

== Discography ==
- 2006
  - AF3 School Bus Album: Game Khong Tur (Your game)
- 2007
  - AF The Musical, Ngern Ngern Ngern (Money Money Money) Album: Kae Kueb
  - Luk Thung 7 Sao Sabud Show Album - 7 Sao Sabud Show (girl group)
- 2008
  - Ost. Pah Loke Bunterng: Kao Kaeng Khor Khai
  - Kunpra Talerng Sok Album: Troos Jeen (Ft. Boy Pisanu)
- 2009
  - The legend of Reh Khai Fun Chaliang the musical Album: Yang Mee
  - Loy Tian (Ft. Off Chainon), Ost. Nong Mai Rai Borisut
- G2G (girl group, since 2009–2010)
  - Girlz to Go Album: Kon Kee Ngao Kub Sao Karng Baan (Girlz next door), Tur Mee Arai Kub Khao Rue Pao, Krai Kor Mai Ruk, Khob Kun Tee Rub Fung
- 2011
  - Project. Music Recipe: Chah Pai Mai Tur
  - Kae Puen (Just friend), Ost. Nong Mai Rai Borisut
- 2012
  - Ost. Tom Yum Lum Sing: Ji Hoy Koy Ruk, Ya Mong Tae Ta
  - Hua Jai Lom Look (Ft. Ron Patarapon), Ost. Nong Mai Rai Borisut
  - Ost. Ma née Dan Suang: Te wada Jao Kha
  - Ost. Raeng Ngao: Ngao Tee Mee Hua Jai (A shadow with a heart)
- 2013
  - Ost. Majurat See Nam Pueng: Nee Hua Jai
  - Nid Nueng Ost. Croissant Tumnong Ruk
  - Kum Wah Puen (Ft. Game Tichakorn), Ost. Nong Mai Rai Borisut
  - Ost. Madam Dun: Laew Chun Ja Luerk Krai (Ft. Nui Nuntakarn)
- 2014
  - Kon Mai Dee ⟨Japanese Ver.⟩, Ost. The Rising Sun: Roy Fun Tawan Duerd
  - Ost. Suer Singh Krating Bong: Ab Ruk Ab Ror
  - Ost. Lookmai Lai Ruk: Reark Wah Ruk Rue Pao (Ft. Boy Pisanu)
- 2016
  - Ost. Kum Lai Mas: Ja Ruk Jon Wun Soot Tai
- 2017
  - Altogether - Crossthy Feat. Mint Tita
- 2021
  - Fah Lang Fon (Ft. Typhoon Kanokchat & Jaja Primrata)
- 2022
  - Ost. Leh Luntaya: Chure Cha Piang Dai
  - Píi Gub Nong... Rong Pleng Kamphee Album: Ma Tarm Sanya
- 2024
  - Ost. My Marvellous Dream is You: Tur Kue Fan Dee (Reverie)

== Awards and nominations ==
Year	Award	Category	Nominated work	Result
2006			True Academy Fantasia Season 3	3rd runner up
2011	Top Award 2010	Best Female Rising Star (Movie)	"My Valentine"	Nominated
2013	4th Nataraja Award 2012	Best Drama Music Award	"Ngao Tee Mee Hua Jai (A Shadow With A Heart)" (Raeng Ngao OST)	Won
