= Ghosthunter =

A ghosthunter is a person who engages in ghost hunting, the process of investigating locations that are allegedly haunted.

Ghosthunter(s), Ghost Hunter(s) or Ghost Hunt may also refer to:

== Literature ==
- Ghost Hunt (novel series), a 1998 light novel involving paranormal investigations, which was later adapted into manga and anime
- Ghost Hunter, a 1986 book by Edward Packard, the 52nd installment in the Choose Your Own Adventure series
- Ghost Hunter, a 2006 novel by Jayne Castle
- Ghost Hunter (novel), a 2009 novel by Michelle Paver
- The Ghost Hunter (novel series), a 1998-2001 series of children's books by Ivan Jones
- The Ghost Hunters, a 1978 novel by Arthur Tofte
- The Ghost Hunters, a 2013 novel by Neil Spring
- Ghosthunters, a 1993-2001 four-book series by German author Cornelia Funke

== Film and television ==
=== Film ===
- Ghosthunter (film), a 2018 documentary film
- Ghosthunters (film), a 2016 horror film
- Death of a Ghost Hunter, a 2007 horror film
- Ghost Hunting (film), a 2017 Palestinian film

=== Television ===
- Ghosthunters (TV series), a British ghost hunting television series
- Ghost Hunters (TV series), an American ghost hunting television series, including spinoffs:
  - Ghost Hunters International
  - Ghost Hunters Academy
- The Ghost Hunter (TV series), a BBC children's TV series
- Ghost Hunt (TV series), a New Zealand reality TV show
- "The Ghosthunter", a 1976 episode of The Bionic Woman
- The Girly Ghosthunters, a Canadian ghost hunting TV series
- BuzzFeed Unsolved: Supernatural, a ghost hunting YouTube series, part of BuzzFeed Unsolved on BuzzFeedBlue

== Video games ==
- Ghosthunter (video game), a 2003 PlayStation 2 video game
- Ghost Hunter or Kurokishi no Kamen, a 1995 graphic adventure game developed by HummingBirdSoft
- Ghost Hunters (video game), a 1986 video game released by Codemasters

== See also ==
- Ghostbusters (disambiguation)
