= Phupoom Pongpanupak =

Thai film and television actor (born 1991)

- ภูภูมิ พงศ์ภาณุภาค
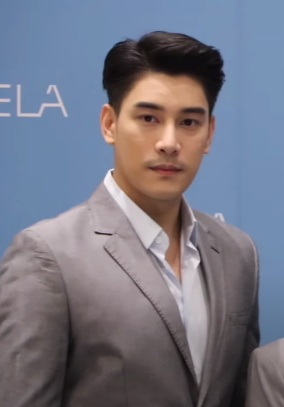
- Born: Adiphong Phanlahaeng; October 20, 1991 (age 35); Bang Rachan, Sing Buri, Thailand
- Other names: Belbel (เบลเบล), Ken
- Education: Business Administration University of the Thai Chamber of Commerce
- Occupations: Actor; singer; MC; YouTuber
- Years active: 2009–present
- Agents: Channel 3 (2011–2020); Freelance (2020–present)
- Height: 1.85 m (6 ft 1 in)

Phupoom Pongpanupak (Thai: ภูภูมิ พงศ์ภาณุภาค; RTGS: Phuphum Phongphanupak), better known by his nickname Ken (เคน), is a Thai actor known for his leading role in the Thai television soap opera Saam Num Nua Thong. He is one of the top Thai actors in Thailand known for his project films including his best friends Mario Maurer, Nadech Kugimiya and Prin Suparat.

== Early life ==
Phupoom was born on October 20, 1991, and raised in Sing Buri Province, Thailand. He is the only child in his family. Phupoom graduated with a bachelor's degree from the Faculty of Business Administration in Finance, University of the Thai Chamber of Commerce.

== Career ==
Phupoom started his career in 2011 as an actor in a Thai film in Fabulous 30. In 2012 Pongpanu was included in the Thai list along with Witwisit Hiranyawongkul and Mario Maurer, when he played in a Thai romantic drama film Love of Siam with them. In 2019, Phupoom decided not to renew the contract with Channel 3 and became a freelance actor. His first drama as a freelance actor will be My Lovely Bodyguard with Wannarot Sonthichai.

== Personal life ==
Phupoom is dating actress Esther Supreeleela. They have been together for 5 years. It was revealed that they first met during a photo shoot for Honeymoon Travel Magazine.

== Filmography ==
=== Films ===
Year	Title	Role	Notes
2009	Hor Taew Tak 2	Belbel	Supporting role
2010	The Intruder		
2011	Fabulous 30	Rassit (Por)	Main role
2012	Saranae Osekkai	Phupoom Pongpanu (Ken)	Supporting role
2018	Nakee 2	Thosapol (present) / Chai Singh (past)	Main role
2020	The Skyless Stars	Shikuma	Main role

=== Television dramas ===
Year	Title	Role	Network	Notes
2011–2012	Sam Noom Nuer Tong	Theetat	Channel 3	Main role
2012	Raeng Ngao	Veekit Apibanbodin	Channel 3	Main role
2014	Look Tard	Kaew / Luang Rattana Attachai	Channel 3	Main role
2014	Dao Kiang Duen	M.L. Jankan Thatsanai	Channel 3	Main role
2015	Kol Kimono	Akira Miyakawa	Channel 3	Main role
2016	Kong Krapan Naree	Natthadet (Luknat)	Channel 3	Main role
2016	Nakee	Thosapol (present) / Chai Singh (past)	Channel 3	Main role
2017	Kammathep Hunsa	Rome Wachirawat	Channel 3	Supporting role
2017	Kamathep Ork Suek	Rome Wachirawat	Channel 3	Guest role
2017	Kamathep Online	Rome Wachirawat	Channel 3	Main role
2017	Loob Korn Kammathep	Rome Wachirawat	Channel 3	Guest role
2017	Rock Letter	Nut	Channel 3	Main role
2018	Meo Me & You	Mai	Channel 3	Main role
2019	Raeng Ngao 2	Veekit Apibanbodin	Channel 3	Main role
2021	Maya Sanaeha	Chakree	Channel 3	Main role
2022	My Lovely Bodyguard	Thewan	One 31	Main role
2024	Luang Lap Jap Tai	Phakorn / Peerawad ()	MONOMAX Sports	Main role
2025	Duangta Sawan	Rawin (Lek)	MONOMAX Sports	Main role
2025	Yon Wela Pen Kham Wela Tai	Plaw	MONOMAX Sports	Main role
2026	Khon Hot Ban Cham	Meka Samrid (Mek) / Meya (Man) ()	MONOMAX Sports	Main role
2026	Moradok Muet	Kahol Metharadrungreang (Mek/Dong)	Channel 7	Main role

=== Television shows ===
Year	Title	Roles	Network
2017	Termites in the House	Guest (Ep. 20)	
2018	Preawpak Check-in	Guest (Ep. 13)	Channel 3

=== MC ===
Online

- 2019 : เคนเอสเธอร์ที่เกาหลี On Air YouTube: KenAndEsther Official
- 2021 : We Plant Grow On Air YouTube: KenAndEsther Official

=== Concerts ===
Concert	Date	Venue	Artists
4+1 Channel 3 Superstar	February 4, 2012	Impact Arena	with Mario Maurer, Pakorn Chatborirak, Prin Suparat, Nadech Kugimiya
Give Me 5 Concert Rate A	October 25, 2014	Impact Arena	with Sukollawat Kanarot, Mario Maurer, Nadech Kugimiya, James Ma
LOVE IS IN THE AIR: CHANNEL 3 CHARITY CONCERT	April 29, 2017	Impact Arena	All Channel 3 actors
