= Love Beyond Frontier (2008 TV series) =

2008 Thai television series

- Thai: เรื่องอุบัติรักข้ามขอบฟ้า
- Developed by: Ping Lampraplerng
- Starring: Pichaya Nitipaisalkul; Pirath Nitipaisalkul; Pattarasya Kruasuwansiri; Jarinporn Joonkiat
- Theme music composer: Pichaya Nitipaisalkul; Pirath Nitipaisalkul
- Country of origin: Thailand
- No. of episodes: 13

Original release
- Network: Modernine TV
- Release: 9 August – 2 November 2008

Related
- Love Beyond Frontier 2; Love Beyond Frontier (2019 TV series)

Love Beyond Frontier (from Thai: อุบัติรักข้ามขอบฟ้า; RTGS: Ubat Rak Kham Khop Fa), is a 2008 Thai lakorn (drama) directed and screen-written by Ping Lampraplerng. It started airing in 2008, starring Pichaya Nitipaisalkul (Golf), Pirath Nitipaisalkul (Mike), Jarinporn Joonkiat (Toey) and Pattarasaya Kruasuwansiri (Peak). It was followed by a sequel Love Beyond Frontier 2 in 2009. The entire series is available to stream on YouTube.

== Synopsis ==
Golf comes from a rich background but refuses to rely on his mother and struggles to make a living by selling things in the JJ market. His dream is to become a singer because he believes it is a way to help the nature like how his deceased father had once done before drowning in the sea. Although he faces constant obstacles, he refuses to back down. He lives alone in a rental apartment and constantly falls behind for the payment, luckily for him, his friend Ple is the owner and while she has a bad mouth and enjoys teasing and getting into fights with Golf, she doesn't have a bad heart and Golf finds himself fallen for her.

Mike has been living in Japan his whole life before his father died and he decided to go in search of his long-gone Thai mother. Having no knowledge of Thailand or the language, he falls into many troubles and meets Pat, a beautiful girl who works in the advertising company and engages actively in an online life (including an online diary and chatting with a boy she thinks understands her). Being kind hearted and realizing that Mike was a good person, she lets him live in her house, and eventually Mike falls in love with her.

Circumstance cause Golf, Mike, Pat, and Ple to meet. Ple having an obsession with everything Japanese, immediately takes a liking to Mike, which stirs everything up. Golf and Mike gained the eye of the music company when they helped Pat with a commercial that required them to show off their natural dancing skills. With everyone commenting that they looked alike and that they could be brothers, Golf's producer decides to form the duo Golf-Mike and their singing career starts there. Unknown to the both of them, Golf's mother is the mother Mike has been looking for, and they were half-brothers.
