= Teeradetch Metawarayut =

Thai actor

- ธีรเดช เมธาวรายุทธ
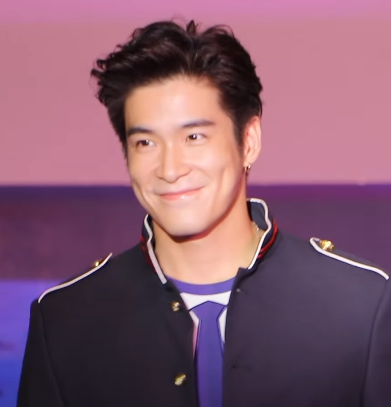
- Teeradetch in 2018
- Born: 15 September 1989 (age 37); Bangkok, Thailand
- Other name: Alek (อาเล็ก)
- Education: Chulalongkorn University
- Occupations: Actor; YouTuber
- Years active: 2012–present
- Agent: Channel 3 (2013–present)
- Notable work: Sapai Jao (2015)

Teeradetch Metawarayut (Thai: ธีรเดช เมธาวรายุทธ; born September 15, 1989), nicknamed Alek (Thai: อาเล็ก) is an actor on Channel 3.

== Early life ==
Alek is the second son of the family. He has 3 siblings, 1 brother, and 1 sister. He graduated high school from Assumption College and then from graduated Faculty of Sports Science at Chulalongkorn University with second class honors. His nickname was originally given to him by his father as Alex, from the name Alexander. But because his family is Thai people of Chinese descent, his father said, "I'm afraid that it might not be suitable for the English name." Therefore, his father changed his mind and use the name Alek instead.

== Career ==
Started into the industry by shooting commercials and music videos. He became known from the movie Crazy Crying Lady starred Araya A. Hargate, then he has many other works following. Alek signed under Channel 3. In 2015, he was nominated for a Golden Television Award in the category of Best Supporting Actor in the drama Sapai Jao (2015) for the role of Khun Chai Lek.

== Filmography ==
=== Film ===
Year	Title	Role	Notes
2012	Crazy Crying Lady คุณนายโฮ	Doc	With Araya A. Hargate
2014	Call Me Bad Girl ความลับนางมารร้าย	Nuersamut	With Peechaya Wattanamontree
2016	I Love You Two จำเนียรวิเวียนโตมร	Tohmorn	With Araya A. Hargate and Pakorn Chatborirak
2025	Our House ข้างบ้าน	Win	With Sarunrat Puagpipat and Nichada Veerasuthimas
2026	Confessions of a Shaman คำสารภาพของหมอผี	Tor	With Denise Jelilcha Kapaun

=== Television ===
Year	Title	Role	Notes	Channel
2013	Pan Rai Phai Ruk	Dr. Prin	Support Role	Channel 3
2014	Nang Rai Summer	Cho	Main Role	Channel 3
2014	Kuan Kaan Tong Gub Gang Por Pla Lai	Kritsada	Main Role	Channel 3
2014	Sai See Plerng 2013	Patchara / "Pat"	Main Role	Channel 3
2014	Tang Duen Hang Ruk	Woot	Main Role	Channel 3
2015	Nang Sao Thong Soi	(Actor on TV)	Guest Role	Channel 3
2015	Kor Pen Jaosao Suk Krung Hai Cheun Jai	Lapit	Main Role	Channel 3
2015	Sapai Jao (2015)	Chai Lek	Main Role	Channel 3
2016	Wai Saeb Saraek Kard	Korn	Main Role	Channel 3
2017	Kammathep Jum Laeng	Kawin / Kevin Blake	Main Role	Channel 3
2018	Sanae Nang Ngiew 2018	Chayuti Kiatkamchon	Main Role	Channel 3
2018	Sanae Rak Nang Sin	Phuree / "Phu"	Main Role	Channel 3
2019	Wai Saeb Saraek Kard 2	Chawanakorn Piamkhun / "Korn"	Main Role	Channel 3
2019	Nee Ruk Nai Krong Fai	Kawin Chayaninporamet / Mark Reeves / Nai Noi	Main Role	Channel 3
2020	Duang Baeb Nee Mai Mee Ju	Chokebordee	Main Role	Channel 3
2021	Keun Ruk Salub Chata	Wat	Main Role	Channel 3
2022	Game Prattana	Anawin	Main Role	Channel 3

=== Musicals ===
Year	Title	Note
2017	ดุจดวงใจไทยทั้งผอง เดอะมิวสิคัล	A special musical drama in remembrance of His Majesty King Bhumibol Adulyadej

=== Music videos appearances ===
Year	Title	Artist
2011	บอกได้ไหม	Chocolate Series
2011	คนมีความรัก	ZEE
2011	ถ้าไม่รักกัน ฉันจะไป	Note Panayanggool
2011	ไม่ใช่คนสวย	Noey Senorita
2012	Second Chance	Singular
2012	บางที	ลูกโป่ง ภคมน
2012	Together	Boy Peacemaker
2012	โปรดรักษาระยะห่าง	Sarika Sathsilpsupa
2013	โดยไม่มีเธอ	ต้น ธนษิต
2013	คนไม่สำคัญ	ต้น ธนษิต
2013	กลัวความห่างไกล	Jaruwat Cheawaram Feat. Wichayanee Pearklin
2013	ยัง	Lipta
2014	เจ็บแค่ไหนก็ยังรักอยู่	Yes'sir Day Feat. Bongkot Charoentham
2016	ไม่เป็นไร	Lipta Feat. UrboyTJ
2020	ระบาย	Yes’sir Days
2020	ลมเป่าไฟ	DAX ROCK RIDER
2021	โอเครึเปล่า	Zentrady (feat. Kong Saharat)
2022	I'll Do It How You Like It	Krit Amnuaydechkorn (PP)

=== Master of Ceremony: MC ===
Year	Network
June 18, 2019 – Present	YouTube: AlekT Official
Jun 30, 2018 – Present	YouTube: KhonDeeTeeNhai Official

== Discography ==
=== Soundtracks ===
Year	Title	Notes
2017	คู่ใจ	Kammathep Jum Laeng กามเทพจำแลง OST
2018	เพราะเธอคนเดียว	Sanae Rak Nang Sin เสน่ห์รักนางซิน OST
2019	พี่ชาย	Nee Ruk Nai Krong Fai หนี้รักในกรงไฟ OST

== Awards and nominations ==
Year	Award	Category	Nominated work	Result
2012	Man of the Year 2012	A rising star in the entertainment industry	—N/a	Won
2016	30th Golden Television Awards	Outstanding Supporting Actor	Sapai Jao (2015)	Nominated
2016	HOWE AWARDS 2015	Shining Actor Award	Sapai Jao (2015)	Won
