= Cris Horwang =

Thai actress and model (born 1980)

- คริส หอวัง
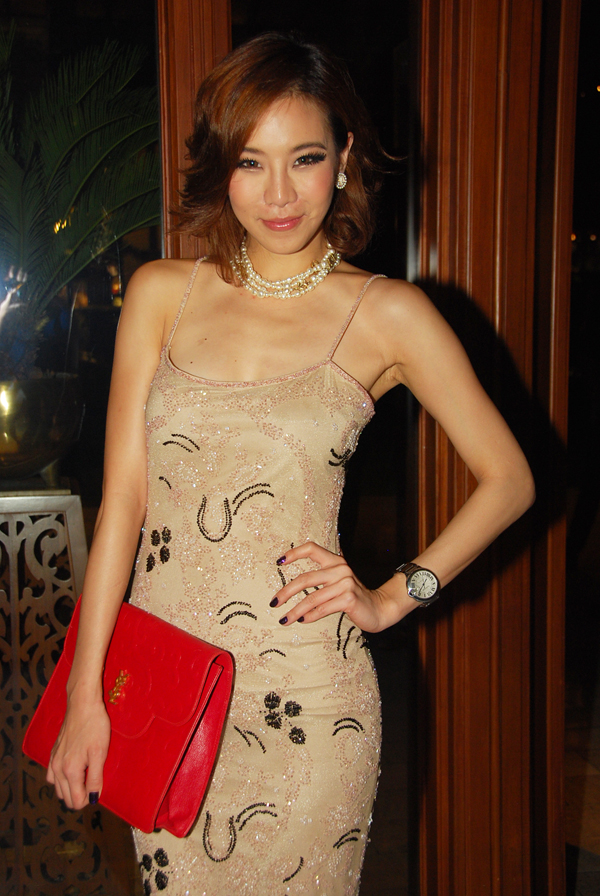
- Cris in 2012
- Born: Celine Horwang (ศิริน หอวัง); 5 July 1980 (age 45); Bangkok, Thailand
- Education: Walnut Hill School; California Institute of the Arts (Advanced Ballet)
- Occupations: Actress; model; DJ; ballet teacher
- Relatives: Ploy Horwang

Celine Horwang (Thai: ศิริน หอวัง; RTGS: Sirin Howang, born 5 July 1980), nicknamed Cris (Thai: คริส; RTGS: Khrit), and known by the stage name Cris Horwang (Thai: คริส หอวัง), is a Thai actress, model, singer, presenter, DJ, choreographer and ballet teacher. In 2009, she was given the lead role in Bangkok Traffic Love Story, a romantic comedy, which turned her into a star overnight.

== Early life and education ==
Cris was born on July 5, 1980, in Bangkok, Thailand. Cris started her career in the entertainment industry at the age of 14 in advertising. She attended Ruamrudee International School and studied dance at Aree Dance Arts School in Bangkok, Thailand. Her parents decided to allow her to study abroad after the 1997 economic crisis. Subsequently, she graduated with a bachelor's degree from Walnut Hill Performance Arts School in Boston and later went on to study advanced ballet at the California Institute of the Arts in the USA. After completing her college degree at CalArts, she returned to Bangkok, where she became a dance teacher at the International School Bangkok (ISB), and also worked as a DJ at Fat Radio. Her breakthrough and most notable role was in Bangkok Traffic Love Story, which had a revenue of over 100 million Baht. It won numerous awards.

== Career ==
Cris officially entered the Thai entertainment business after returning from the United States. She has worked in the business for 7 years. She and Koy Rachawin were invited by Ploy Horwang to become a DJ on 104.5 Fat radio, which became her first job. She also landed other opportunities to work as a model, presenter, and singer. She caught the eye of producer, Tom Yutthalerd, who convinced her to take a role in the romantic comedy movie "E-Tim tai nae " as "Ma Khin". Though a supporting role, her talent and skills were evident. And she was later chosen to play as "Meili" in Bangkok Traffic Love Story, with the famous and reputable Thai actor, Ken Theeradej. This became her breakthrough role.

Since then she has become a popular Thai celebrity and has consistently worked as an actress, model, singer, presenter, choreographer, and dance teacher. Other movies she has starred in include Saturday Killer (2010), Headshot (2011), Seven Something (2012), Choice (2013), Oh My Ghost (2013), The Life of Gravity (2014), amongst others. Recently, she has become a mentor on popular TV show, The Face Thailand. In 2018, she was a guest judge on the third episode of Drag Race Thailand (season 1), "Curtain to Couture."

In 2011, Cris also started her own handbag and accessories line, Secret Weapon.

== Filmography ==
=== Film ===
Year	Title	Role	Notes	Ref.
2008	E-Tim tai nae อีติ๋มตายแน่	Ma Khin	Supporting Role	
2009	Bangkok Traffic Love Story รถไฟฟ้ามาหานะเธอ	Mei Li	Lead Role	
2009	Oh My Ghosts! โอ้!มายโกสต์ คุณผีช่วย	Be	Lead Role	
2010	Saturday Killer มือปืนดาวพระเสาร์	Chris Styer	Lead Role	
2011	HeadShot ฝนตกขึ้นฟ้า	Rin	Supporting Role	
2012	Seven Something รัก 7 ปี ดี 7 หน	Mam	Lead Role	
2013	Oh! My Ghost Khun Pee Chuay โอ้! มายโกสต์ คุณผีช่วย	Bee	Lead Role	
2014	The Life of Gravity แรงดึงดูด	Mook	Lead Role	

=== Television ===
Year	English Title	Thai Title	Role	Network	Notes	Ref.
2014	Club Friday The Series 4 Rue Ruk Thae Ja Pae Kvarm Thong Karn	Club Friday The Series 4 หรือรักแท้จะแพ้ความต้องการ	Fah	GMM 25	Lead Role	
2015	Club Friday The Series 4 6 Kvarm Ruk Mai Pid Torn Ti ... Daung Cha-Tar	Club Friday The Series 6 ความรักไม่ผิด ตอน ผิดที่ ... ดวงชะตา	Koy	GMM 25	Lead Role	
2015	Peun Ruk Peun Rissaya	พื่อนรักเพื่อนริษยา	Laila	Channel 3	Main Cast	
2017	Mea Luang	เมียหลวง	Ornin	Channel 3	Main Cast	
2017	Kammathep Hunsa	กามเทพหรรษา	Horm Muen Li (Horm)	Channel 3	Guest	
2017	Kamathep Ork Suek	กามเทพออกศึก	Horm Muen Li (Horm)	Channel 3	Lead Role	
2017	Kamathep Online	กามเทพออนไลน์	Horm Muen Li (Horm)	Channel 3	Guest	
2017	Sorn Ruk Kammathep	ซ่อนรักกามเทพ	Horm Muen Li (Horm)	Channel 3	Guest	
2017	Kammathep Jum Laeng	กามเทพจำแลง	Horm Muen Li (Horm)	Channel 3	Guest	
2017	Kamathep Prab Marn	กามเทพปราบมาร	Horm Muen Li (Horm)	Channel 3	Guest	
2019	Daai Daeng	ด้ายแดง	Susie	Channel 3	Main Cast	
2019	Club Friday The Series Season 11: Lhong Ruk	Club Friday The Series 11 รักที่ไม่ได้ออกอากาศ ตอน หลงรัก		GMM 25	Main Cast	
2020	Bpai Hai Teung Duang Dao	ไปให้ถึงดวงดาว	Hemsuda	OneHD	Main Cast	
2020	Nuer Nai	เนื้อใน	Khem Petch	GMM 25	Main Cast	
2022	Mama Gogo	แม่มาคุม...หนุ่มบาร์ร้อน	Annie	GMM 25	Main Cast	
2022	Suptar 2550	ซุปตาร์2550	Janifer (Jane)	Channel 3	Guest	
2022	Rakkaew	รากแก้ว	Rungrong Naruubodee (Rong)	Channel 3	Main Cast	
2022	Intern in My Heart	เด็กฝึกหน้าใสเติมหัวใจนายหญิง Intern in My Heart	Rin	WeTV	Main Cast	

== Accolades ==
In 2010, Cris has earned several awards. She won awards for her work in Bangkok Traffic Love Story, including the Kom Chud Lerk Award, Seventeen Choice Award, Star Pix Award, Star Entertainment Award 2009, Cha Lerm Thai Award, Siam Dara Award and she got t Best Actress Award that from Top Award.

Awards					
Year	Award	Category	Nominated work	Result	Ref.
2008	Kom Chad Luek Awards	Best Supporting Actress	E-Tim tai nae	Nominated	
2008	Suphannahong National Film Awards	Best Supporting Actress	E-Tim tai nae	Nominated	
2008	Bangkok Critics Assembly Awards	Best Supporting Actress	E-Tim tai nae	Nominated	
2009	Seventeen Choice Awards	Seventeen Choice Actress	Bangkok Traffic (Love) Story	Won	
2009	7th Kom Chad Luek Awards	Best Leading Actress	Bangkok Traffic (Love) Story	Won	
2009	19th Suphannahong National Film Awards	Best Leading Actress	Bangkok Traffic (Love) Story	Won	
2009	Top Awards	Best Leading Actress	Bangkok Traffic (Love) Story	Nominated	
2009	Chaluem Thai Awards	Leading Actress Of The Year	Bangkok Traffic (Love) Story	Won	
2009	3rd Nine Entertain Awards	Actress Of The Year	Bangkok Traffic (Love) Story	Nominated	
2009	8th Star Entertainment Awards	Best Leading Actress	Bangkok Traffic (Love) Story	Won	
2009	Hamburger Awards	Best Leading Actress	Bangkok Traffic (Love) Story	Won	
2009	Bangkok Critics Assembly Awards	Best Leading Actress	Bangkok Traffic (Love) Story	Won	
2009	Star Pick Awards	Best Leading Actress	Bangkok Traffic (Love) Story	Won	
2009	Beloved Media Awards	Best Leading Actress	Bangkok Traffic (Love) Story	Won	
2010	Siam Dara Awards	Best Leading Actress	Bangkok Traffic (Love) Story	Won	
2012	6th Asian Film Awards	Best Supporting Actress	Headshot	Nominated	
2020	35th TV Gold Awards	Outstanding Leading Actress	Truth Reveals	Won	
2023	37th TV Gold Awards	Outstanding Leading Actress	The Root	Nominated	
2023	19th Kom Chad Luek Awards	Best Actress for TV series	The Root	Nominated	
