= Araya A. Hargate =

Thai actress (born 1981)

- อารยา เอ ฮาร์เก็ต
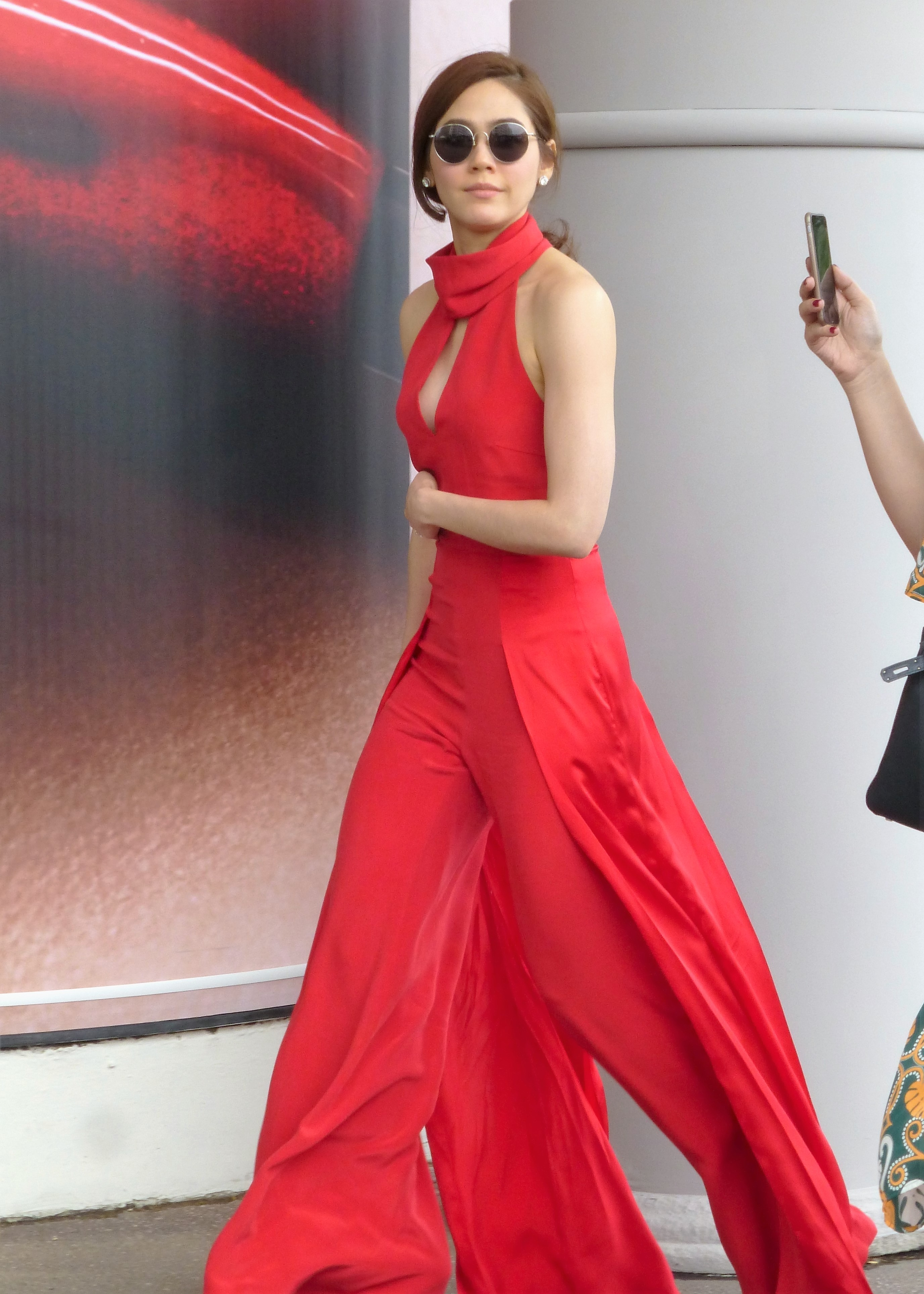
- Araya Hargate at the Hotel Martinez 2016
- Born: Araya Alberta Hargate; 28 June 1981 (age 45); Bangkok, Thailand
- Other name: Chompoo (lit."rose apple")
- Education: Rangsit University
- Occupations: Actress; model; TV host
- Years active: 1998–present
- Agents: Daravideo (1998–2008); Channel 3 (2008–present)
- Height: 1.70 m (5 ft 7 in)
- Spouse: Visrut Rangsisingpipat (m. 2015)
- Children: 3
- Website: Official website

Araya Alberta Hargate (Thai: อารยา อัลเบอร์ต้า ฮาร์เก็ต; born 28 June 1981), better known as Araya A. Hargate (Thai: อารยา เอ ฮาร์เก็ต) or Chompoo (Thai: ชมพู่; RTGS: Chomphu lit."rose apple"), is a Thai actress, model, host, TV personality and cover girl of British descent. Her most notable achievement is her role in Doksom Sithong. She is of English, Lao and Thai descent.

== Biography ==
=== Early life ===
Araya is Eurasian or Luk khrueng. She graduated from Rangsit University with a Bachelor of Arts.

=== Career ===
She rose to fame in 1998 after winning a beauty pageant, Miss Motor Show Contest, and soon became a household name on her hit lakorn or Thai soap opera. At the age of just 17, her first acting role was in a Lakorn by the title Pleng Prai, produced by Channel 7 in 1998.

Apart from acting, Araya is a model. She received FHM Sexiest Actress in Thailand Awards 2007-2010. She is known as a fashionista and High Fashion Queen. She has also an ambassador for L'Oréal Paris and a regular guest at International Fashion Weeks and at the Cannes Film Festival. Later she was a brand ambassador for fashion magazine L’Officiel Thailand at the Shanghai International Film Festival.

== Personal life ==
On 6 May 2015, Araya married Witsarut "Nott" Rungsisingpipat, her boyfriend of six years and heir to a business fortune.

On 6 September 2017, she went to Bumrungrad Hospital and gave birth in the afternoon to twin sons Saifah Rangsisingpipat and Bhayu Rangsisingpipat

== Filmography ==
=== Film ===
Year	Title	Role	Notes
2010	Saranae Siblor	Dao	Supporting role
2012	Crazy Crying Lady	Mrs. Ho (Ho)	Main role
2016	I Love You Two	Vivian	Main role
2019	Tootsies & The Fake	Nam/Kathy	
2023	Long, Live, Love	Meta	Main role

=== Television series ===
Year	Title	Role	Network	Notes
1998	Marnya Risaya	Model	Channel 5	Guest Role
1999	Pleng Prai	Ployngam	Channel 7	
2000	Sawatdee Khun Pu Fung	Jirawat Demond (Gigi)	Channel 7	
2000	Luk Mai Klai Ton	Sasikan Bintornwachara (Sasi)	Channel 7	Support Role
2000	Rai Dieng Sa	Linen Chanthananan (Ja)	Channel 7	
2001	Mae Mod Jao Sa Nae	Naripop (Tammy)	Channel 7	
2001	Hua Jai Nai Soon Ya Kard	Kleenat (Fa)	Channel 7	
2002	Wang Duay Jai Pai Duay Fun	Waewdao	Channel 7	
2002	Tarm Ruk Tarm Lah	Alisa Nanakorn	Channel 7	
2003	Morlum Summer	Annie	Channel 7	
2003	Kaew Ta Warn Jai 2003	Wanayawas Asavaruangrit (Kaiwarn)	Channel 7	
2003	Benja Keta Kwarm Ruk	Entertainment program host	Channel 7	Cameo
2004	Fai Nai Wayu 2004	Salil Khidkuson (Lookwah)	Channel 7	
2004	Oun I Ruk	Wanyiwa Asavaruangrit (Kaiwarn) ()	Channel 7	
2004	Yod Nam Nai Tawan	Tawan	Channel 7	
2005	Ra Hud Hua Jai	Wimlin Intharakun (PooKong Dao)	Channel 7	
2005	Kol Luang Ruk	Rasita Weerachaichai (Sita)	Channel 7	
2006	Duang	Phimphan (Pim)	Channel 7	
2006	Plaew Fai Nai Fhun 2006	Leelawadee	Channel 7	
2006	Puen Ruk Puen Rai	Waetita Panichkul (Way)	Channel 7	
2007	Loke Song Bai Khong Nai Kon Diew	Kaew	Channel 7	
2007	Pee Pien Hotel (Sitcom)		Channel 7	
2007	Ruk Tae Zaab Lai		Channel 7	
2008	Saeng Dao Hang Hua Jai	Napasorn	Channel 7	
2008	Dao Bpeuan Din	Rinladaa	Channel 7	
2009	Plerng Prai	Dien	Channel 3	
2009	Fai Shone Sang	Tianwan Sasikulwaratorn (Tian) / Wantakarn Sasikulwaratorn (Wan)	Channel 3	
2010	Wiwa Wah Woon	Airada	Channel 3	
2011	Rahut Torachon	Matsaya	Channel 3	
2011	Dok Som See Thong	Raeya Wongsawet / Fah	Channel 3	
2011	Mia Taeng	Arunprapai	Channel 3	
2012	Tom Yum Rum Shing	Rungrawi Srila	Channel 3	
2012	Noom Ban Rai Kub Wan Ja Hai So	Nabdao	Channel 3	
2012	Ruk Khun Tao Fah	Khaotoo	Channel 3	
2012	Khun Samee Karmalor Tee Rak	Pimmapa	Channel 3	
2013	Kon Ruk Strawberry	Anya	Channel 3	
2014	Sai See Plerng 2014	Saruta / Sai	Channel 3	
2015	Kol Kimono	Rindara (present)/ Myojooji (Past)	Channel 3	
2015	Nang Rai Tee Rak	Herself	Channel 3	Guest Role
2017	Kammathep Hunsa	Waralee Pitakchan (Je Lee)	Channel 3	Guest Role
2017	Kamathep Ork Suek	Waralee Pitakchan (Je Lee)	Channel 3	Guest Role
2017	Kamathep Online	Waralee Pitakchan (Je Lee)	Channel 3	Guest Role
2017	Loob Kom Kammathep	Waralee Pitakchan (Je Lee)	Channel 3	Guest Role
2017	Sorn Ruk Kammathep	Waralee Pitakchan (Je Lee)	Channel 3	Guest Role
2017	Kammathep Sorn Kol	Waralee Pitakchan (Je Lee)	Channel 3	Guest Role
2017	Kammathep Jum Laeng	Waralee Pitakchan (Je Lee)	Channel 3	Guest Role
2017	Kamathep Prab Marn	Waralee Pitakchan (Je Lee)	Channel 3	Main Cast
2022	Suptar 2550		Channel 3	Guest Role
TBA			Channel 3	

=== Television program ===
- 3 Zaaap

=== Music Video ===
- 1998 Rutua Bang Mai (รู้ตัวบ้างไหม) - Raptor (RS/YouTube:rsfriends) with Joni Anwar
- 2000 Chan Kho Thod (ฉันขอโทษ) - Thitima Prathumthip (GMM/YouTube:GMM GRAMMY OFFICIAL)
- 2000 (จดหมายจากพระจันทร์) - Thitima Prathumthip (GMM/YouTube:GMM GRAMMY OFFICIAL)
- 2006 (เหตุเกิดจากความเหงา) - Emotion Town (AnyMind Music/YouTube:Win EmotionTown) with Thana Suttikamul
- 2007 Huang (หวง) - Thanapond Wagprayoon (RS/YouTube:rsfriends) with ฤทธิ์ กาไชย
- 2007 Purn Sa Nit Kid Mai Seuah (เพื่อนสนิทคิดไม่ซื่อ) - Saranyu Winaipanit (GMM/YouTube:GMM GRAMMY OFFICIAL)
- 2008 Seang Hua Jai Wan Rai Tur (เสียงหัวใจวันไร้เธอ) - Thanapond Wagprayoon (RS/YouTube:rsfriends) with เติ้ล ชรักษ์กานต์
- 2008 สมน้ำหน้า (Som Nam Na (It serves me right)) - Patiparn Patavekarn (GMM/YouTube:)
- 2009 Cha Yu Kap Chan Thang Khuen Dai Mai (จะอยู่กับฉันทั้งคืนได้ไหม) - Neung Jakkawal Feat. ETC. (/YouTube:หนึ่ง จักรวาล 1Jakkawal) with Neung Etc
- 2010 Pleng kong ter (เพลงของเธอ) - Thanapond Wagprayoon (RS/YouTube:rsfriends) with Somchai Kemglad
- 2010 (เหมือนตาย...ทั้งที่ใกล้กัน) - Thanapond Wagprayoon (RS/YouTube:rsfriends) with Somchai Kemglad
- 2011 Chiwit Khu (ชีวิตคู่) - Thanapond Wagprayoon (RS/YouTube:rsfriends) with Somchai Kemglad
- 2011 La Ai Jai (ละอายใจ) - DJ. Jea Mam (Winai Suksaweang) (werecordsgmm/YouTube:werecordsgmm) with Thanavat Vatthanaputi
- 2011 Poo Ying Ngoh Ngoh Tee Yaum Tur Ngai Ngai (ผู้หญิงโง่ๆที่ยอมเธอง่ายๆ) - Panadda Ruangwut (GMM/YouTube:GMM GRAMMY OFFICIAL)
- 2011 (ให้เลวกว่านี้) - Thanapond Wagprayoon (RS/YouTube:rsfriends)
- 2012 Soft touch with your love () - Chompoo Feat. ETC. (/YouTube:Lux Thailand)
- 2013 W8 (ร (W8)) - GENE KASIDIT (จีน กษิดิศ) (Smallroom/YouTube:SMALLROOM) with กษิดิศ สำเนียง
- 2015 Sud-Swing Ringo Eto Bump (สุดสวิงริงโก้อีโต้บั๊มพ์) - Udom Taepanich And Thanida Thamwimon (/YouTube:ThaiStandupComedy)

== Award ==
Year	Award	Category	Nominated work	Result	Ref.
2000	Top Award 2000	Best Female Morning Star	Luk Mai Klai Ton	Won	
2002	Thepthong Award	Outstanding Personnel in Radio Television 2002	Sour, Sweet, Burning	Won	
2003	Outstanding Artist Award for Anti-Drug Attendance	—N/a	—N/a	Won	
2006	4th komchadluek award	Best Actress in a Television Drama Series	Puen Ruk Puen Rai	Nominated	
2007	FHM Sexiest Woman In Thailand 2007 Award	—N/a	—N/a	Won	
2008	Seventeen Choice Awards 2008	Best Actress Awards 2008	—N/a	Won	
2008	FHM SexiestActress In Thailand 2008 Award	—N/a	—N/a	Won	
2008	SiambanterngStar's Choice Awards 2008	Sexy Awards	—N/a	Won	
2008	W Style Awards	Best celebrities with their own styles and dress	—N/a	Won	
2008	Beautiful ZEN Sexy Body Award	Zen Body Sense 2008	—N/a	Won	
2008	The Most Priew 2008 Award from Praew Magazine	—N/a	—N/a	Won	
2009	FHMSexiest Actress In Thailand 2009 Award	—N/a	—N/a	Won	
2009	The evil reward is love from 94 EFM Birthday Fest # 2	—N/a	—N/a	Won	
2009	23 th Television Golden Award	Best Actress	Dao Bpeuan Din	Won	
2009	6th Hamburger Awards	Best Actress	Dao Bpeuan Din	Nominated	
2009	Star Entertainment Awards 2008	Best Supporting Actress	Dao Bpeuan Din	Nominated	
2009	TV Inside Hot Awards 2009	Hot Sexy Female Star of the Year Award	—N/a	Won	
2009	SiambanterngStar's Choice Awards 2009	Sexy Awards	—N/a	Won	
2009	Siamdara StarParty 2009	Star Sexy Award	—N/a	Won	
2009	SUDSAPDA	Best Actress Award	—N/a	Won	
2009	4th komchadluek award	Best Actress in a Television Drama Series	Fai Chon Saeng	Nominated	
2009	Top Award 2009	Best Actress	Fai Chon Saeng	Nominated	
2009	7th Hamburger Awards	Best Actress	Fai Chon Saeng	Nominated	
2009	SeventeenChoice Hottie Female 2009	Young & smart vote 2009	—N/a	Won	
2009	InStyleCloset Smarts 2009	Best of Style Award	—N/a	Won	
2009	Seventeen Teen Choice Awards 2009	Seventeen Choice Hottie Female 2009	—N/a	Won	
2009	Award for real recognition, 2009, excellent branch	—N/a	—N/a	Won	
2010	Outstanding alumni award from Rangsit University	—N/a	—N/a	Won	
2010	Siam Dara Star Award 2010	The beloved branch of Siam Dara journalist	—N/a	Won	
2010	FHM Sexiest Woman in Thailand 2010 Award	—N/a	—N/a	Won	
2010	TV Inside Hot Awards 2010	Hot Sexy Female Star of the Year	—N/a	Won	
2010	Okay Award	Beautiful Women in the Eyes of Women	—N/a	Won	
2010	Clean bouquet award Promote honesty in Thai society From the Office of National Anti-Corruption (NACC)	—N/a	—N/a	Won	
2010	SiambanterngStar's Choice Awards 2010	Sexy Awards	—N/a	Won	
2010	TV Pool Star Party Awards 2010	Best Star of the Year	—N/a	Won	
2011	Siam Dara Stars Awards 2011	Best Actress	Dok Som See Thong	Won	
2011	FHM Sexiest Actress In Thailand 2011	—N/a	—N/a	Won	
2011	1 th Dara Daily The Great Awards	Best Actress in a Leading Role, Theater of the Year	Dok Som See Thong	Won	
2011	10 Most Influential women of the year 2011	Influential woman of the year Best Fashion Icon	—N/a	Won	
2011	Men's Health Editor’s Choice Awards 2011	Totally Hot Women	—N/a	Won	
2011	Seventeen Choice Actress Awards 2011	—N/a	—N/a	Won	
2011	10 years HAMBURGER The Decade of Fame	Female Style	—N/a	Won	
2011	10 years HAMBURGER The Decade of Fame	The Best Actress	—N/a	Won	
2011	Oops Award	Actress of the Year	Dok Som See Thong	Won	
2011	The starburst show	Most female stars of the year 2011	Dok Som See Thong	Won	
2011	Entertainment 5 Page 1 Award	Best Actress	Dok Som See Thong	Won	
2011	SEESAN NEWS AWARDS 2011	Best Actress	Dok Som See Thong	Won	
