= Suvicha Mekangkul =

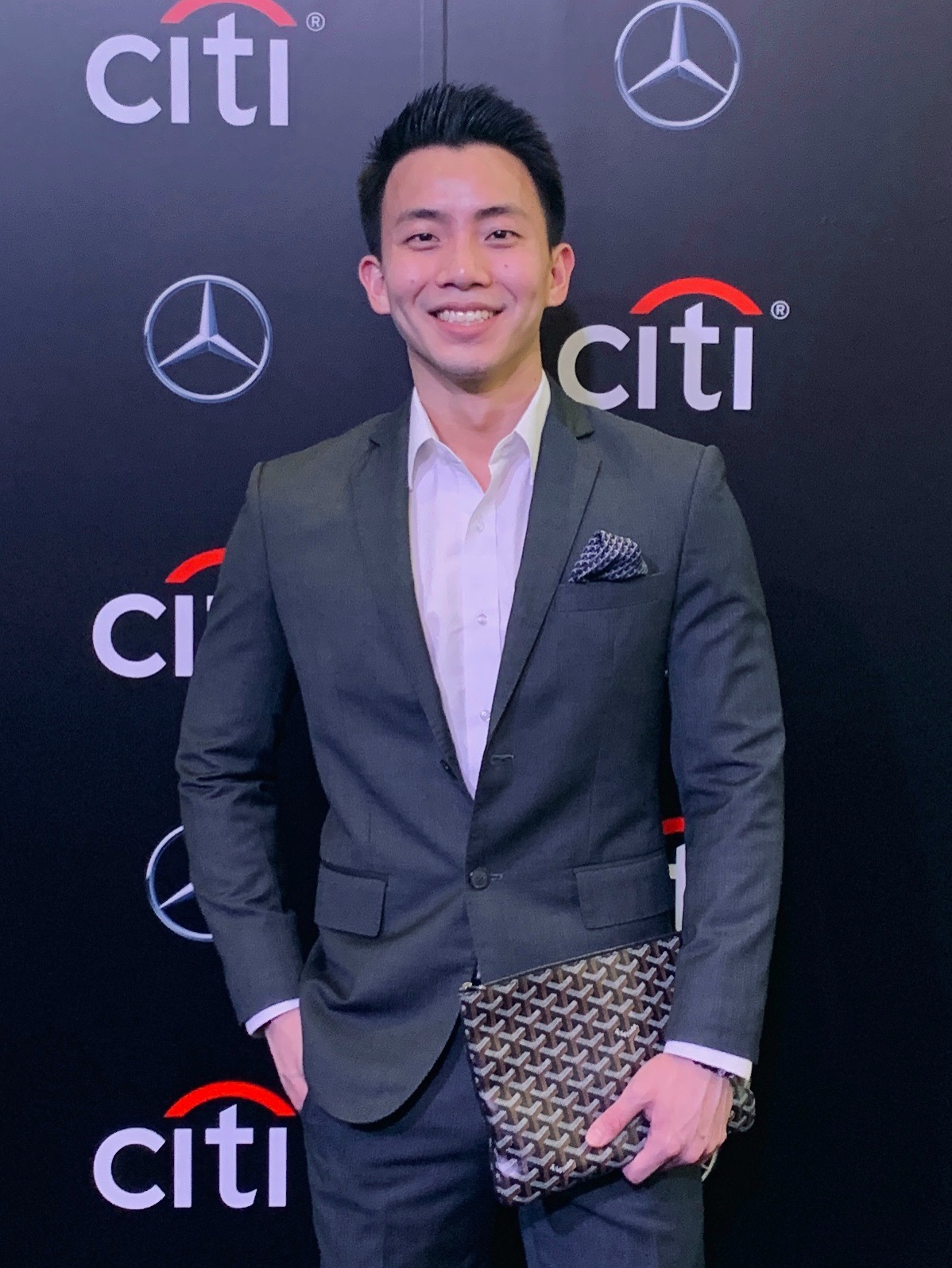
- Suvicha Mekangkul at Citi Mercedes Credit Card’s grand opening event, 2019
- Born: 27 May 1993 (age 32); Bangkok, Thailand
- Other names: Boom; Boom Suvicha
- Education: Chulalongkorn University; MIT Sloan School of Management
- Occupations: Celebrity, Blogger

Suvicha Mekangkul (Thai: สุวิชา เมฆอังกูร, born 10 May 1993), better known as Boom Suvicha (Thai: บูม สุวิชา), is a Thai celebrity and travel blogger. He began his career in the Thai entertainment industry as a DJ at FM 98.

== Biography ==
=== Early life and education ===
Suvicha Mekangkul was born on 27 May 1993 in Bangkok, Thailand. He completed his middle school education at Patumwan Demonstration School, Srinakharinwirot University and high school education at Triam Udom Suksa School.

He earned a Bachelor of Business Administration at Chulalongkorn Business School, Faculty of Commerce and Accountancy, Chulalongkorn University, and later graduated with a master's degree in Finance from MIT Sloan School of Management with full scholarship.

=== Career ===
Suvicha started his career in the entertainment industry as a DJ for FM Pynk 98 in 2011, after which he has starred music videos and been a model for advertisements as well as a travel blogger. Suvicha told Nation Multimedia Group’s Krungthep Turakij that he loves travelling and that he likes to visit hotels with distinguished designs and good services. Inspired by different cultures and people and travelling itself, Suvicha started his travel blog. “Travelling gives me the opportunity to experience different culture and people, all of which inspired me to capture beautiful photos and moments and share them to people who also love travelling like me,” said Suvicha in the 2020 interview with Siamrath.

Suvicha and his work have been profiled by Manager Daily, Naewna, Siamrath, Lokwannee, Bangkok-Today and Gossipstar.
