= Leopold Robert =

Leopold Robert may refer to:

- Dr. Leopold Robert, first director of the Queen Saovabha Memorial Institute
- Louis Léopold Robert (1794–1835), Swiss painter
