= Shell Quiz =

- The Saint Gabriel's and Suankularb Wittayalai Nonthaburi teams during the 2007 finals
- Genre: Educational game show
- Country of origin: Thailand
- Original languages: English; Thai
- No. of seasons: 44

Original release
- Network: Thai TV Channel 4 (1965–74); MCOT Channel 9 (1974–2000); TVT Channel 11 (2001–06); ETV (2006–?); Nation Channel (2007–09)
- Release: 1965 – 2009

Shell Quiz, known in its latest iteration as Shell Quiz on the Road, is a televised upper-secondary school quiz competition in Thailand which was broadcast from 1965 to 2009. The questions are given in English, and deal with a broad range of topics of knowledge, with the English language itself as a focus. The programme was sponsored by Shell Thailand. At the time of its last season, it was the longest-running television programme in the country.

== Production history ==
The programme was organized by the Public Relations Department of Shell Thailand. It was first broadcast in 1965 on Thai TV Channel 4 (a.k.a. Channel 4 Bangkhunphrom), Thailand's first television channel and the precursor to Channel 9 and Modernine TV. The programme changed broadcasters many times, and was also broadcast on Channel 7, Channel 5 and Channel 11, the last of which broadcast the programme from 2001–2006. The programme was also mirrored on the Educational Television Station (ETV) from 2006 onwards. The format of the show gradually changed with time, from having contestants provide written answers to be marked by the judges and scores kept on a blackboard, to a buzzer lockout system with electronic scoreboards beginning in the 1981 season. The nature of the quiz questions also expanded to encompass different formats, including video-based comprehension questions and word-hinting games. Questions from the programme were routinely published in the Nation Junior Magazine.

Beginning in 2007, in cooperation with the Nation Junior Magazine, a new format was introduced, moving production from the studio to participating schools across the country. The programme was titled Shell Quiz on the Road, and was broadcast on the Nation Channel. This new format was continued for three years. The final season, the programme's forty-fourth overall, was broadcast in 2009.

== Format ==
Prior to the 2007 season, the programme was conducted by a presenter and a native English-speaking quiz master, who presented the questions while the presenter offered explanations in Thai afterwards. From 1995–2006, the Language Institute of Chulalongkorn University co-produced the programme by providing the presenters and the questions for the programme. Teams of three students from forty-eight schools competed in a single-elimination tournament of one-on-one matches, except for the finals where all three teams met.

In the 2007 and later seasons, the number of participating schools was increased to sixty-four, with four teams of two students meeting in each match. The format was changed to accommodate a single presenter who read the questions and provided commentary, assuming a more informal style than the university instructors previously did. This role was fulfilled by Suphajon Klinsuwan, former Nation Channel reporter. A panel of three judges scored the answers.

Each match consists of four parts, namely: Questions and Answers, where general knowledge questions are asked; Watching and Listening, a video-based comprehension test; Pictorial Dictation, where contestants have to write down names of objects ranging from the common to the obscure; and the Word Clue Game, a word guessing game in which contestants give hints to provided words for their teammates to guess.

== Results ==
From 2007, the winners received a trophy from HRH Princess Maha Chakri Sirindhorn, as well as scholarships and cash prizes. Prior seasons offered award plaques from the Shell Company and cash prizes to the winners and runners-up. Results of all past seasons are as follows:

Season	Winner
1965	
1967	
1968	
1969	
1970	Debsirin School
1971	
1972	
1973	Debsirin School
1974	
1975	
1976	
1977	
1978	
1979	
1980	
1981	
1982	Debsirin School
1983	
1984	
1985	
1986	
1987	Chulalongkorn Demonstration School

Season	Winner
1988	Bangkok Christian College
1989	
1990	
1991	
1992	Triam Udom Suksa
1993	
1994	Suankularb Wittayalai
1995	Chulalongkorn Demonstration School
1996	Triam Udom Suksa
1997	Triam Udom Suksa
1998	Triam Udom Suksa
1999	Triam Udom Suksa
2000	Triam Udom Suksa
2001	Triam Udom Suksa
2002	Patumwan Demonstration School
2003	Triam Udom Suksa
2004	Assumption College
2005	Triam Udom Suksa
2006	Suankularb Wittayalai
2007	Triam Udom Suksa
2008	Triam Udom Suksa
2009	Kasetsart University Laboratory School
