= Henri Dunant Road =

Street in Pathum Wan, Bangkok, Thailand

Coordinates: 13°44′23.38″N 100°32′3.38″E

Henri Dunant Road as seen from Chaloem Phao junction heading King Chulalongkorn Memorial Hospital

Henri Dunant Road (Thai: ถนนอังรีดูนังต์) is a road in Pathum Wan sub-district, Pathum Wan district, central Bangkok. It's a short road that runs straight from Rama I road at Chaloem Phao junction to the end at Henri Dunant intersection across Rama IV and Surawong roads in the area near Lumphini Park and King Chulalongkorn Memorial Hospital. Its total distance is 1.6 km (0.9 mi).

== History ==
Originally, it was called "Sanam Ma Road" (ถนนสนามม้า; lit. 'horse racing venue road') because it was a road through Pathum Wan Racecourse (now Royal Bangkok Sports Club). Later on May 8, 1965, which falls on World Red Cross and Red Crescent Day. It has been renamed "Henry Dunant" in honour of former Swiss banker Henry Dunant, founder of International Committee of the Red Cross.

== Landmarks ==
Although it's a short road, but it runs through many important places such as Royal Bangkok Sports Club, Thai Red Cross Society and Queen Saovabha Memorial Institute, Faculty of Political Science, Chulalongkorn University, Faculty of Engineering, Chulalongkorn University, Chulalongkorn University Auditorium, Faculty of Arts, Chulalongkorn University, Triam Udom Suksa School, Patumwan Demonstration School, Srinakharinwirot University, Faculty of Veterinary Science, Chulalongkorn University, Faculty of Dentistry, Chulalongkorn University, Siam Square, King Chulalongkorn Memorial Hospital, Srisavarindhira Thai Red Cross Institute of Nursing, Faculty of Medicine, Chulalongkorn University, Police Nursing College, Police General Hospital, Royal Thai Police Headquarters.
