= Patpasit Na Songkhla =

Thai actor (born 1998)

- ภัทรพสิษฐ์ ณ สงขลา
- Born: October 23, 1996 (age 29); Thailand
- Other name: Cooper Patpasit
- Education: University of the Thai Chamber of Commerce - Communication Arts
- Occupation: Actor
- Years active: 2016–present
- Notable work: My Bromance (2016), My Engineer (2020), Pastsenger (2023), Let Me Into Your Heart (2026)

Patpasit Na Songkhla (Thai: ภัทรพสิษฐ์ ณ สงขลา; born 19 February 1998), also known as Cooper Patpasit, is a Thai actor. He is best known for his leading roles in the series My Bromance (2016), My Engineer (2020), and Pastsenger (2023), as well as being part of the cast of Let Me Into Your Heart (2026).

== Biography ==
Patpasit was born in Thailand and belongs to the Na Songkhla family, a traditional surname in the country.

He studied Communication Arts at the University of the Thai Chamber of Commerce (UTCC).

Before starting his acting career, he briefly joined the boy group 6Teen.

His first notable role came in 2016 with the series My Bromance, where he played Golf. The series was broadcast on Channel 9 MCOT HD and LINE TV.

In 2020, he starred in the BL series My Engineer as Bohn, which was streamed on WeTV.

In 2023, he played the lead role of Kiao in Pastsenger, aired on Channel 3.

In 2025, he was announced as part of the cast of Let Me Into Your Heart, broadcast on GMM 25.

== Filmography ==
=== Television ===
Year	Title	Episodes	Role	Type	Network
2025	Let Me Into Your Heart	10	Kwang	Main role	GMM 25
2023	Pastsenger	12	Kiao	Main role	Channel 3
2020	My Engineer	14	Bohn	Main role	WeTV
2019	Fleet of Time	20	Choke	Supporting role	—
2018	Way Back Home	6	Pol	Supporting role	—
2016	My Bromance	12	"Golf" Jirayut	Main role	Channel 9 MCOT HD / LINE TV

=== Films ===
Year	Title	Role	Type
2023	Slyth: The Hunt Saga	Frame	Supporting role
2014	Gang Preed Ja Read Jai Thoe	Kho	Supporting role
