= Talay Sanguandikul =

Thai actor (born 1995)

- ทะเล สงวนดีกุล
- Born: 9 September 1995 (age 31)
- Occupations: Artist; Actor; Streamer
- Agent: Insight Entertainment
- Known for: King in My Engineer; Pun in YYY The Series
- Height: 177 cm (5 ft 9 1/2 in)

Talay Sanguandikul (Thai: ทะเล สงวนดีกุล, born 9 September 1995), also known as Lay (Thai: เล), is a Thai artist and actor. He is best known from the series My Engineer and YYY The Series.

== Early life and education ==
Talay Sanguandikul was born on 9 September 1995. "Talay" means "sea", chosen by his father who owned the resort business Koh Samed Thailand. His official fanclub name is "Less Sweet Gang" (Thai: แก๊งหวานน้อย).

Talay attended Saint Gabriel's College. He graduated with the second honor in Bachelor's degree of Arts Program in Social Communication Innovation, Majoring in Interactive and Multimedia Design, from College of Social Communication Innovation, Srinakharinwirot University.

== Filmography ==
=== Television series ===
Year	Title	Role	Network	Notes	Ref.
2017	RejctX	Steve	ZEE5	Supporting role	
2017	Noir	Toey	Channel 3	Supporting role	
2017	Sailub Jub Abb	XinJiang	Channel 3	Supporting role	
2020	My Engineer	King	WeTV	Main role	
2020	YYY มันส์เว่อร์นะ	Pun	Line TV	Main role	
2021	Close Friend: Just One Life	XiaoPing	Viu	Main role	
2021	Y-Destiny: Friday	Masuk	AIS Play	Main role	
2021	Switch On		Channel 3	Guest role	
2022	Sing Again	Sun & Ray	TrueID	Main role	
2022	War of Y	"P" Atichon Wangwatthana	AIS Play	Main role	
2024	Start-Up	Thanakorn	TrueID	Supporting role	
2025	Reverse with Me	Fiat	Channel 3	Supporting role	
2025	Suntiny	Masuk	IQIYI	Guest role	
2026	Love of Silom	Mind	WeTV	Supporting role	

=== Music video appearances ===
- The Devil - Stamp Apiwat
- ติดตลก - OAT Pramote
- ไม่เกี่ยวกับเธอ - New Jiew
- มาไงคาใจ - Dif Kids x K.Aglet feat.Praewa
- รักไม่มีกฏเกณฑ์ - Ton Tanasit (ost. The Series My Engineer)
- คนที่ฉันรอ - MOD3G x JOELONG (ost. The Series My Engineer)
- YYY - BALLCHON feat.Piggynoii (ost. YYY The Series)
- เธอไม่คิดอะไร - EASE
- ชาตินี้พอ - O Pavee
- โคตรไม่แฟร์ - Bell Warisara

== Discography ==
- "ตัลลั๊ค" - TALAY x YOON (ost. YYY The Series)
- "First Time Lonely (เหงาแหละ)" - TALAY x TOMMY (Boyfriends Project)
- "Why Destiny" - Y Destiny Cast (ost. Y Destiny)
- "Supernova (รั้น)" - TALAY x NARA x Preen x Fame x MarkNTK (ost. Sing Again the Series)
- "Loser (ขี้แพ้ชั่วคราว)" - TALAY x NARA x Preen x Fame x MarkNTK (ost. Sing Again the Series)
- "อยากให้เธอกอดคนที่ใช้" - TALAY x NARA feat.Tik Playground
- "Chocolate" - Be My Boyfriends 2
- "IWBYBF" - Be My Boyfriends 2 (ost. Rose in da House)
- "In My Room" - TALAY x BOUN x MARK (Unit from Be My Boyfriends 2)
- "แพ้ความอ่อนแอ" - TALAY (original by Sillyfools)
- "แอบอยากรู้ (Hush)" - TALAY
- "แพ้ความอ่อนแอ" - TALAY x Indigo (Muzik Move Your Feeling)
- "แค่ได้เป็นคนสุดท้ายที่เธอคิดถึง" - TALAY x Earth Patravee (original by Pause)
- "今でも君を (Hush)" - TALAY (Japanese Version)

== Concerts ==
- My Engineer 1st Fan Meeting "More Than Just My Engineer"
- Be My Boyfriends Concert (Boyfriends Project)
- Be My Boyfriends Concert 2

== Award and nominations ==
Award nominations for Talay Sanguandikul
Year	Award	Category	Nominee(s)	Result	Ref.
2021	The Yniverse Awards 2020	Best Supporting Actor	My Engineer	Won	
2021	The Yniverse Awards 2020	Star of the Year		Won	
