= Let Me Into Your Heart =

2025 Thai Boys' Love television series

- Genre: Romantic drama; Boys' Love
- Written by: Tanachot Prapasri
- Country of origin: Thailand
- Original language: Thai
- No. of seasons: 1
- No. of episodes: 10

Production
- Running time: 47 minutes
- Production company: Viva Entertainment

Original release
- Network: GMM 25; YouTube
- Release: 3 December 2025 – present

Let Me Into Your Heart is a 2025 Thai Boys' Love romantic drama television series produced by Viva Entertainment and broadcast on GMM 25. Starring Zaleng Teerachot Klaymongkon, Leon Krittapod Bunyamanee, Atom Nathaphop Kanjanteak and Patpasit Na Songkhla, the series premiered on December 3, 2025, with weekly episodes, and is also streamed internationally via YouTube.

== Synopsis ==
Two likay performers from different troupes are forced to join efforts to promote a major show. While everything seems smooth on stage, behind the scenes they clash constantly, exposing rivalries and tensions that challenge their relationship.

== Cast ==
=== Main ===
- Zaleng Teerachot Klaymongkon as "Ja" Jamakorn Sroisangsuriya
- Leon Krittapod Bunyamanee as Jack Theeradon
- Atom Nathaphop Kanjanteak as Thanu
- Patpasit Na Songkhla as Kwang

=== Supporting ===
- Poy Tanutcha Taikham as Fern Hoenfa
- Gig Irada Boonmee as Mona
- Singha Sitthinon Rochanametakul as Keng
- Joseph Pharmtharm Gorach as Film
- Nu Puttiwat Sathanthoranin as Dew
- Tintin Jarasrawee Thiemrat as Theme
- Kim Goodburn as Win
- Thames Sanpakit as Pu (Viva Entertainment executive)
- Jubjang Wimolphan Chaleejunghan as Pia
- Chutcha Rujinanon as Phrikkhing

=== Guest ===
- Tanachot Prapasri as Bang
- Meenay Jutai as Penny

== Broadcast ==
The series is broadcast in Thailand on GMM 25 and streamed internationally via YouTube. It premiered on December 3, 2025, with weekly episodes on Wednesdays, totaling 10 episodes. A pilot episode was released on May 20, 2025, on YouTube.

== Reception ==
TrueID highlighted the premiere as one of the most anticipated of late 2025. The Standard emphasized the blend of traditional likay performance with contemporary storytelling. MGR Online reported on the premiere and noted the show's potential in the BL market. Thai PBS featured the series in its cultural program Song Hunter TV. Mango Zero highlighted the positive reception among younger audiences. Naewna discussed the cultural impact of the series. TNN Thailand also covered the premiere and audience expectations.
