= Pin Malakul =

Thai educator and writer

Mom Luang Pin Malakul
- ปิ่น มาลากุล
- Pin at Chaing Mai University site, 1960

Minister of Education
- In office 1957–1969
- Prime Minister: Pote Sarasin; Sarit Thanarat; Thanom Kittikachorn
- Preceded by: Munee Mahasanthana Vejayantarungsarit
- Succeeded by: Sukich Nimmanheminda

Minister of Culture
- In office 21 September 1957 – 20 October 1958
- Preceded by: Prayoon Yuthasastrkosol
- Succeeded by: Post terminated

Personal details
- Born: 24 October 1903 Bangkok, Siam
- Died: 5 October 1995 (aged 91) Bangkok, Thailand
- Spouse: Thanpuying Dussadee Malakul Na Ayutthaya (m. 1932)
- Education: University of Oxford
- Awards: National Artist in Literature (1987); ASEAN Award in Literature (1992)

Mom Luang Pin Malakul (Note: Mom luang is a Thai honorific hereditary title denoting a royal bloodline; the subject's personal name was Pin Malakul.) (Thai: หม่อมหลวงปิ่น มาลากุล, RTGS: Pin Malakun; 24 October 1903 – 5 October 1995) was a Thai professor, educator and writer. His contributions to education in Thailand include the establishment of various institutions of higher education, the introduction of fixed class schedules, and the implementation of teacher-training programmes. In his career he served as Director-General of the Department of General Education, later becoming Permanent Secretary, and Minister, of Education. He was also a member of the executive board of UNESCO. His writings earned him the title of National Artist in 1987, and the 100th anniversary of his birth was celebrated by the UNESCO in 2003 as recognition of his contribution to the advancement of education in Thailand and Southeast Asia.

== Personal life ==
=== Early life and education ===
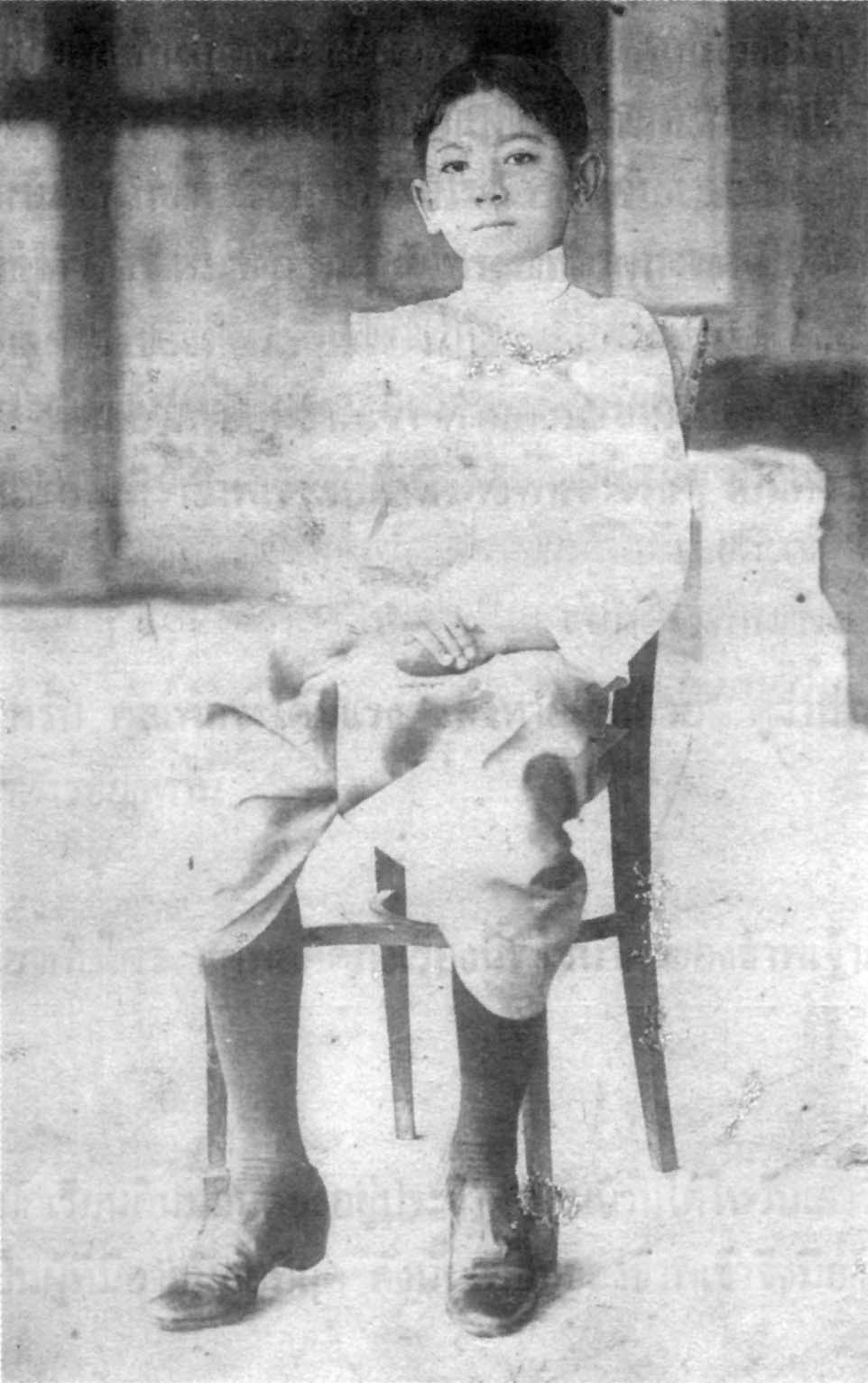
Pin as a student at Suankularb Wittayalai School

Mom Luang Pin Malakul was born on 24 October 1903 to Mom Rajawongse Pia (Note: Mom rajawongse also denotes a royal bloodline. Pia Malakul was also known by his noble title as Chao Phraya Phrasadet Surentharathibodi.) and Thanpuying Sa-ngiam Malakul. (Note: Thanpuying is a Thai title equivalent to dame. Sa-ngiam was her given name.) He was the sixth of thirteen children (although the fourth, and the only son, to survive past infancy). His father, a nobleman and great-grandson of King Phuttha Loetla Naphalai, had served as King Vajiravudh's guardian during the King's overseas studies and held posts including Ambassador to the United Kingdom. Pia's work was instrumental in the establishment of higher education in Thailand (then known as Siam) and he later became the third Minister of Public Instruction under King Vajiravudh.

Pin recalled in his autobiography that although his mother was a kind and loving figure, his father was rather strict and acted more like a teacher than a father, and that he was often fearful of him. A loyal servant of the crown, Pia introduced Pin to King Vajiravudh when he was seven years old. Another often-recounted story from his childhood is that of how, before having learned to count, when his mother asked him to gather half a bunch of betel leaves for her, Pin set down to picking up one leaf with each hand at a time, separating them equally into two piles.

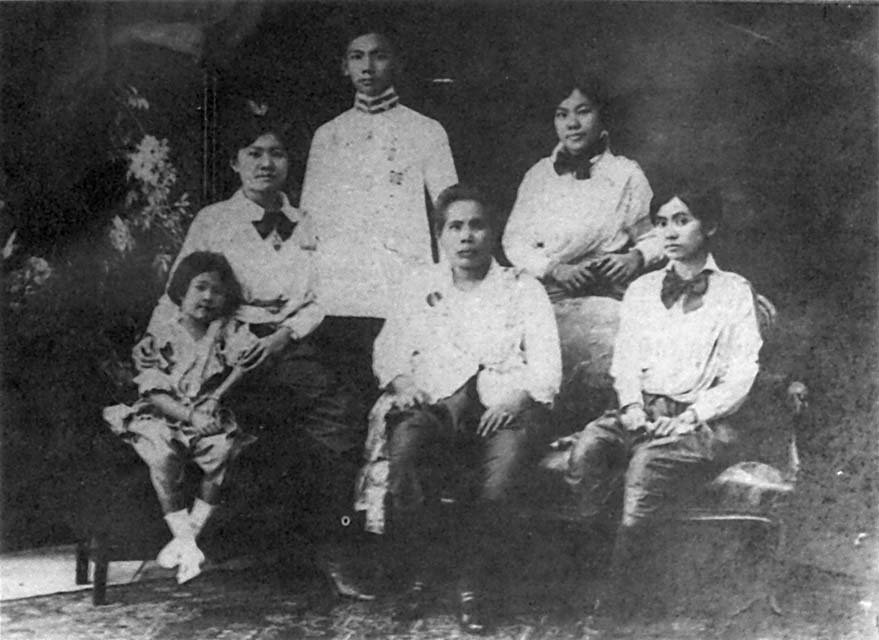
Pin with his mother and four sisters

At the age of four, Pin began receiving preliminary education from teachers who came to teach at the family home on Damrongrak Road, next to Varadis Palace. He enrolled at Suankularb Wittayalai School (then known as Wat Ratchaburana School) shortly before turning seven in 1910, and after half a year his examination results placed him at Mathayom 1 level. In 1914 he was accepted into the Royal Pages School (now Vajiravudh College). Half a year later, King Vajiravudh named him one of eight Royal Page Students (นักเรียนมหาดเล็กรับใช้) in the king's personal service. Although he did not attend regular classes at the school afterwards, he passed exams at Mathayom 5 level (grade 11) at the end of the school year.

As a Royal Page Student, Pin's duties included various tasks in the royal household as well as accompanying the King in his various activities. The Royal Page Students were involved in plays and sports games held in court and also in activities of the King's scouting-related paramilitary movement, the Wild Tiger Corps. Pin also became an editor of the Dusit Samit Magazine, part of the King's Dusit Thani miniature city/micronation project. One memorable task appointed to him by the King was to determine the day of week King Naresuan left Ayutthaya for his famous elephant duel, a problem Pin was unable to solve at the time, but became the inspiration for his later development of the "Everlasting Calendar". He lived in the royal court most of the time and received a salary of twenty to thirty baht.

=== Life in Europe ===
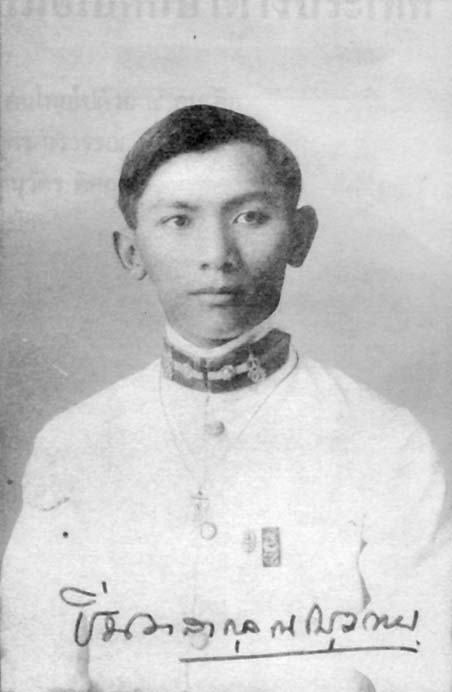
Pin in 1922, before departing for London

In 1922, when Pin was eighteen years old, the Ministry of Public Instruction, in accordance with the King's wishes, granted him a government scholarship for a tertiary education in ancient Eastern languages in the United Kingdom. He departed aboard the MS Jutlandia on 23 January 1922 and arrived in London on 7 March.

During his first two years, Pin studied Pali and Sanskrit at the University of London School of Oriental and African Studies and lived with Mr and Mrs L. J. Marshall of 23, Portland Place, Brighton, from whom he also received additional instruction in mathematics, English, and French. Such was his talent in mathematics that Mr Marshall, who was head of Mathematics and Surveying at Brighton Technical College, wrote to the Superintendent of Siamese Government Students recommending that Pin major in mathematics instead and saying that his skills would undoubtedly warrant a university scholarship for mathematical studies. This, however, did not suit the requirements of the Ministry of Public Instruction, and so Pin did not continue his mathematics education. Nevertheless, his interest in the field did not waver, and he continued to produce works on the subject. Among these are his publication in 1927 in Samaggi Sara, the journal of Samaggi Samagom (the Thai Association in the UK), of a formula which he called the "Everlasting Calendar", upon which he later based the development of a set of slide rules which could be used to calculate the day of week for any given date, and his publication of Miscellaneous Problems, a collection of various mathematical problems he had worked on, later in 1960.

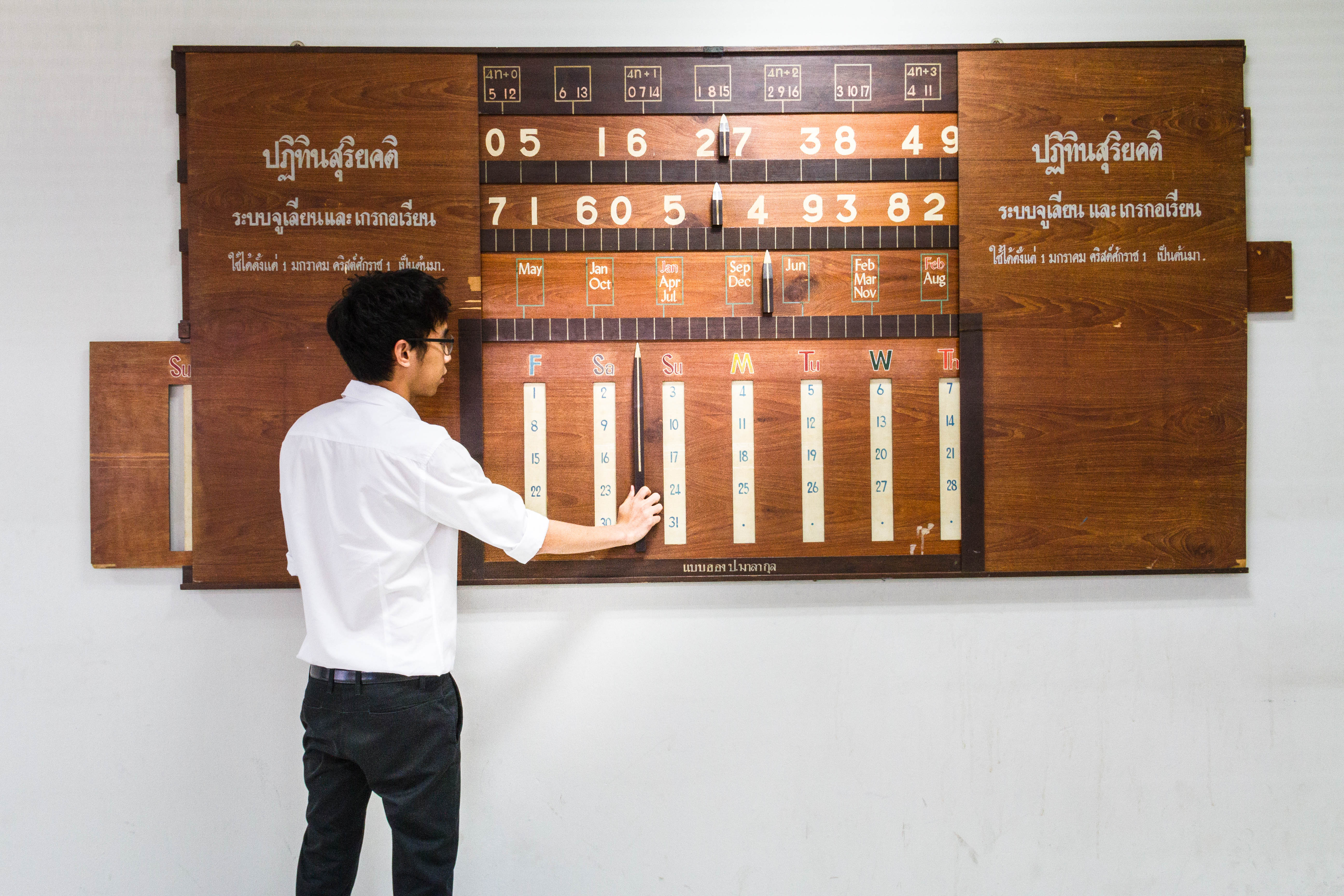
Perpetual calendar designed by Pin, showing the day of the week for a given date, displayed at his memorial room at Silpakorn University

In England Pin formed close friendships with fellow Thai students Prince Dulbhakara Worawan, Visuddhi Krairiksh, and Phanom Thephasdin, the first of which with whom he had been friends since their time as Royal Page Students. He also developed a taste for opera and classical music, on which he recalled spending quite a disproportionate amount of his scholarship's allowance, eventually building a collection of 317 records.

Pin was accepted into Brasenose College of the University of Oxford in 1924, where he studied in the Honour School of Oriental Studies for four years. He graduated with a BA degree on 28 June 1928. He then enrolled in a one-year course in education also at Oxford, according to the wishes of the Ministry of Public Instruction. He practice-taught at The Latymer School during the school year, but fell ill during the winter and again near the end of the school year late in the spring of 1929, which adversely affected his studies. He was later awarded the Oxbridge MA degree on 15 October 1931.

After finishing his studies, Pin accompanied Princess Kalyanga Sombati Kitiyakara on a one-month trip in Europe. Upon return to London, he attended the First World Conference on Adult Education on behalf of Siam, but during the same time his health deteriorated further, and he was diagnosed with tuberculosis. Accordingly, his return trip to Siam had to be postponed in order for him to recover in Switzerland. There he spent almost two years in Davos and later Klosters, until September 1931 when he attended the League of Nations annual conference before returning to Siam via a Nippon Yusen ship departing from Naples, Italy. He finally arrived in Siam on 23 October 1931, after spending over nine years abroad.

=== Marriage ===
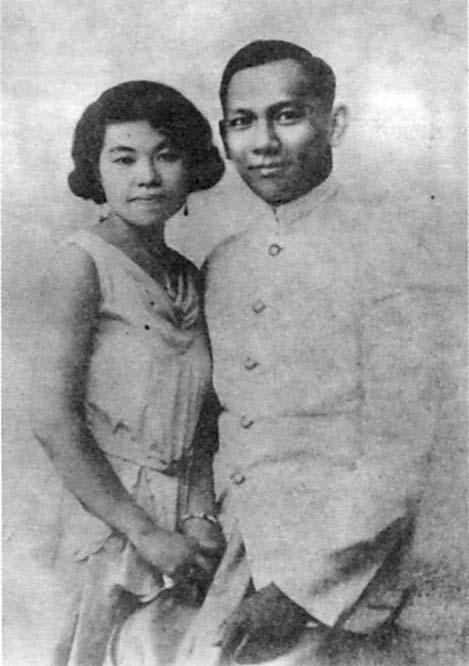
Pin and Thanpuying Dussadee on their wedding day

Pin married Miss Dussadeemala Krairiksh, (Note: Later known as Thanpuying Dussadee Malakul Na Ayutthaya.) daughter of Chao Phraya Mahithon and Thanpuying Klip, on 7 March 1932. They lived at the Krairiksh family home before building a house on the Damrongrak Road property, and finally settled at Soi Chaiyot on Sukhumvit Road in 1938. They had no children.

== Work ==
=== Early years ===
Upon Pin's return from Europe in 1931, Public Instruction Minister Prince Dhani Nivat appointed him as a government official under Krom Vichakan, a department of the ministry. He also served the Prince in a somewhat unofficial capacity, assisting the Prince's work and observing the ministry's various goings-on. Under the Prince's directions, Pin became an instructor in mathematics, Thai, and English at Chulalongkorn University, in addition to the various duties he performed for the ministry. In 1934, he became head of the university's teacher-preparation programme and headmaster of the Horwang Secondary School of Chulalongkorn University, which served as the country's first demonstration (teacher training) school. He began developing projects for the school, although few of them were realised at the time. One such project was the creation of the country's first school workshop.

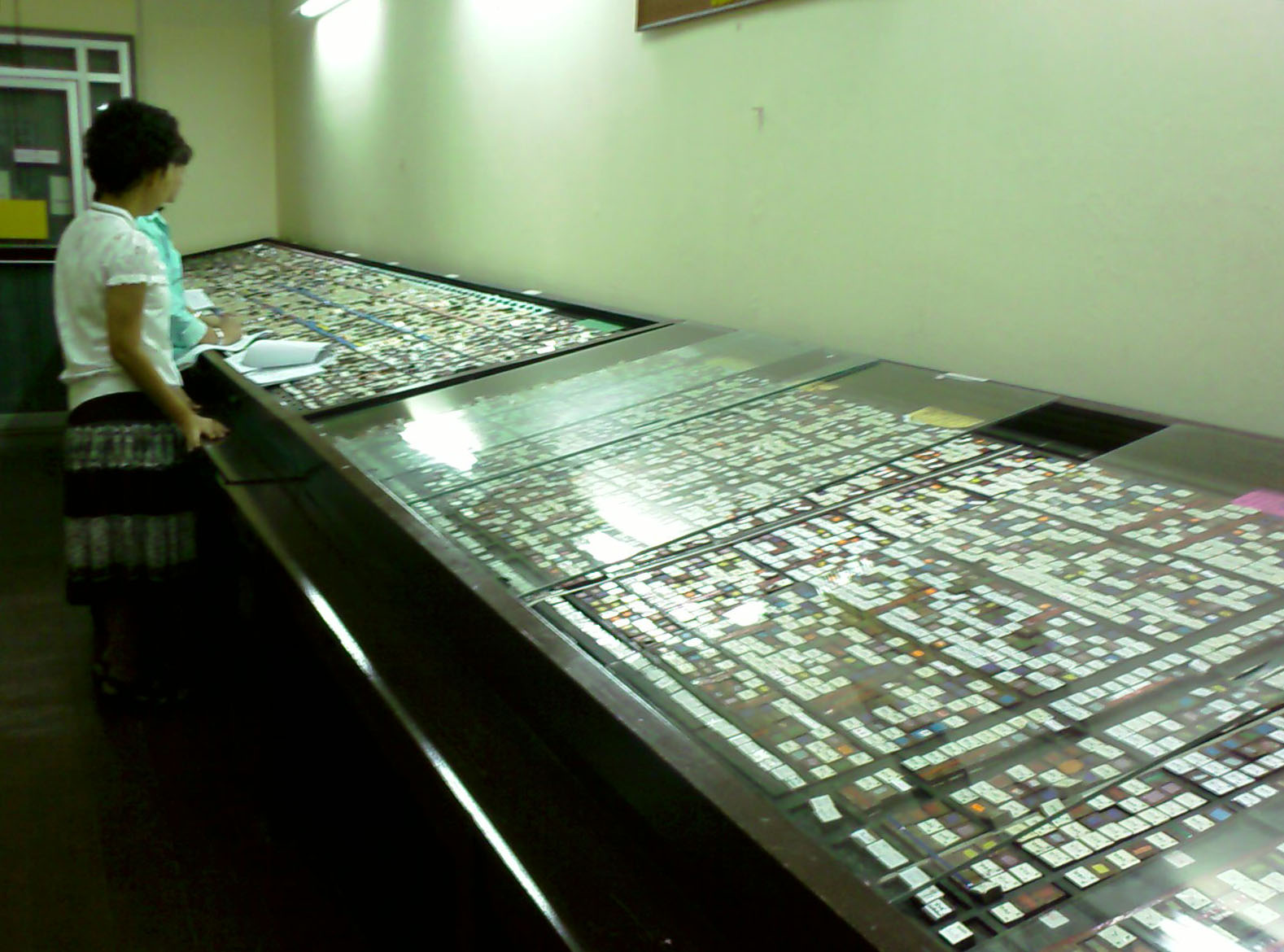
The mechanical timetable devised by Pin is still currently in use.

In 1938, Plaek Pibulsonggram, as President of Chulalongkorn University, assigned Pin the duty of overseeing the establishment of Chulalongkorn's University Preparatory School according to the National Education Plan of BE 2479 (1936 CE). Although given a tight time frame of only three months, the new school was created on the location of Horwang School, and gradually absorbed the older school, the entire staff merging within a few years. Pin became the first director of the school, the country's first coeducational school, now known as Triam Udom Suksa School. It is widely regarded as one of the best schools in the country. During his term as director, which lasted until 1944, he developed and implemented a fixed class schedule system, along with a mechanical timetable used to assign teaching periods, which is still in use today.

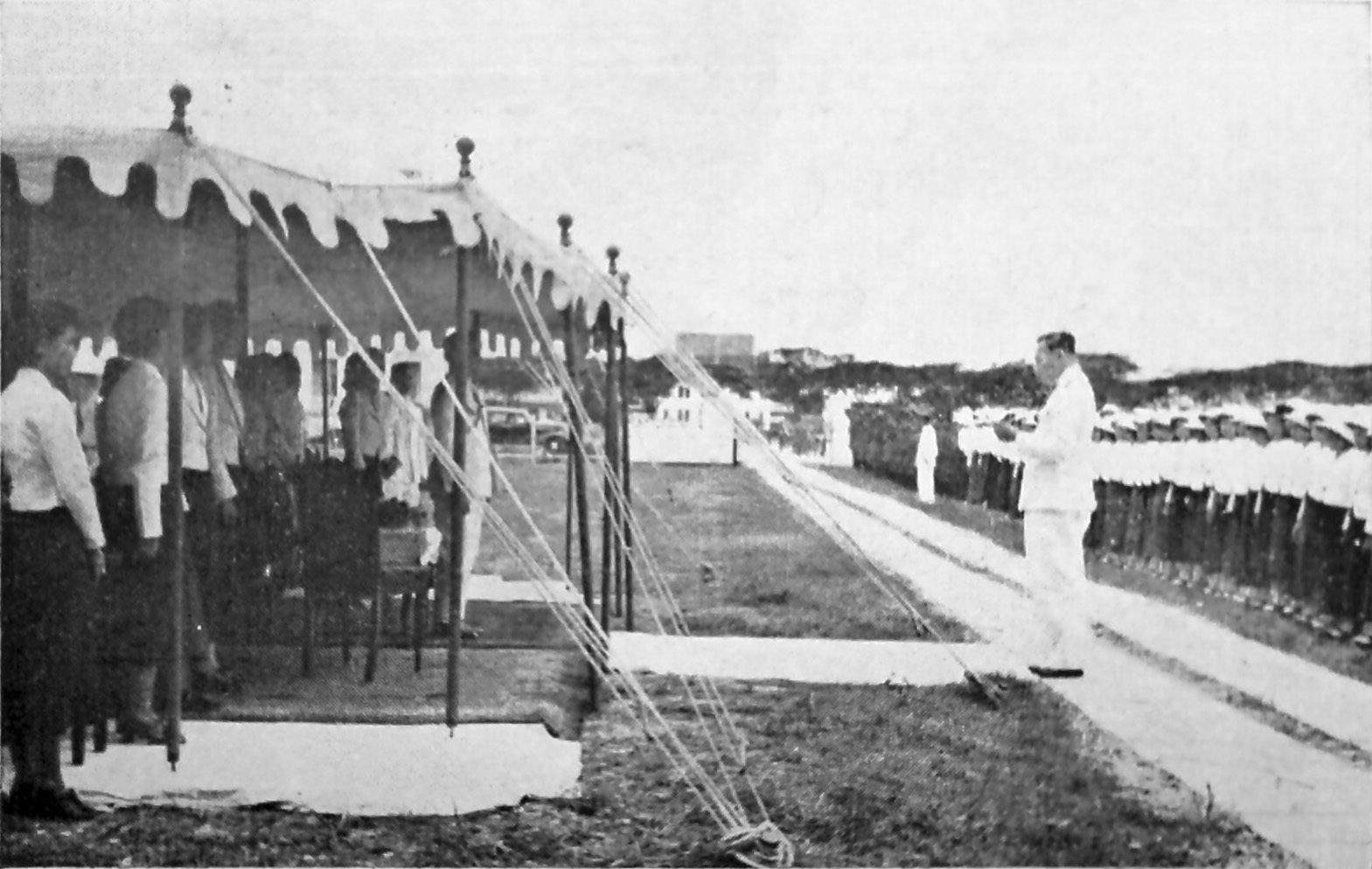
Pin addresses the Minister of Education during the opening ceremony of Triam Udom Suksa School's main building

As World War II reached Thailand in December 1941, Japanese troops raided and occupied the school, forcing teachers and students to evacuate and relocate to temporary locations around Bangkok, and later to various other provinces. At one point, Pin disguised himself as a janitor to smuggle important documents and cash out of the school.

In 1942, not long after the invasion, Prime Minister Pibulsonggram assumed the post of education minister himself, and appointed Pin as Director-General of the Department of General Education. Although resources were limited due to the war, Pin was able to manage the budget and personnel to allow a countrywide 12 baht salary for rural local schoolteachers. During his term, every province was provided with at least one upper-secondary school. He also became involved in frequent school migrations due to both the war and changing policy.

One issue with which Pin was deeply concerned was that of the country's teacher-training system, an issue he stressed during an audience with King Ananda Mahidol after the war in 1946, and would later address during his term as Permanent Secretary of Education.

=== As Permanent Secretary of Education ===
Pin became Permanent Secretary of the Ministry of Education in 1946. In this capacity, he oversaw the founding in 1949 of the Higher Teacher Training School at Prasanmit, now Srinakharinwirot University, and the drafting of the first national education plan.

Administration-wise, Krom Vichakan (or the Department of Curriculum and Instruction Development) was re-created in 1952 and the Department of Teacher Education was created in 1954, along with the expansion of the Higher Teacher Training School to become the College of Education, of which Pin served as president until 1956. He later oversaw the creation of the college's Prasanmit Primary Demonstration School.

Pin also pioneered the field of distance education via the "educational radio" broadcasting station, which was set up at Thung Maha Mek Technical College in 1954. Despite obstacles and limited support, the programme proved successful and continually developed, and is now under the authority of the Centre for Educational Technology. He also continued to teach at Chulalongkorn University, where he was appointed an adjunct professor in education in 1954.

As permanent secretary, Pin acted as the head delegate for Thailand to the third UNESCO General Conference in Beirut in 1948, where Thailand was an observer, and represented Thailand as the country filed for membership in 1949 and was accepted as the fifty-fifth member state. He served as director and coordinator for the Seminar on Rural Adult Education in Mysore, India, that year, and regularly represented Thailand in subsequent UNESCO meetings.

He was elected to two terms on the UNESCO Executive Board from 1952 to 1956, during which he supported and helped advance UNESCO's programmes for promotion of universal compulsory education in Asian countries. His representation also lead to cooperative projects between the UNESCO and Thailand, including the Thailand UNESCO Rulral Teacher Education Project and the Thailand UNESCO Fundamental Education Center at Ubon Ratchathani Province, among others. Even after his term ended as permanent secretary, Pin was still involved in UNESCO activities in Thailand. He facilitated the establishment of UNESCO's regional office in Bangkok, which opened in 1961, and was among the founders of the Southeast Asian Ministers of Education Organization.

=== As Minister of Education ===
In 1957 Army Commander Sarit Dhanarajata executed a coup and installed Pote Sarasin as prime minister. Pin subsequently received "an offer he could not refuse" to join his cabinet as Minister of Education and of Culture. Pin was also included in the following cabinets of Thanom Kittikachorn and Sarit himself, with Sarit holding power as Thailand's strongman leader until his death, after which he was succeeded by Thanom. Sarit pushed for a revival of the monarchy's importance, which was aided by Pin's royalist ideals, and school textbooks were revised to feature the monarchy prominently. Pin served as Minister of Education until 1969, when general elections were held and the Prime Minister reshuffled the cabinet, replacing the six most senior members. (The post of Minister of Culture was terminated in 1958.)

As Minister of Education, Pin established the Regional Education Development Project including higher education, which aimed to study the needs and limitations of education systems in the provinces. Spanning over two years, results of the project included the improvement of cooperation between government officials and Muslim locals in the four southernmost provinces, recognition of the need for children living near the Malay and Cambodian borders to be able to learn the Thai language before starting school, and the experimental development of a curriculum based on learners' needs and interests at Suranaree School.

As part of the project, Pin made preparations for the founding of Chiang Mai University, planning the campus and beginning construction, but the authority over the project was ultimately transferred to the Office of the Educational Council. He served three terms as President of Silpakorn University from 1965 to 1971, during which he founded the university's Sanam Chandra Palace Campus. There he intended to establish a collegiate university system following that used at Oxford, as advised when he was Permanent Secretary of Education by Prime Minister Pibulsonggram, and Thap Kaew College was opened in 1968. However, the college system turned out to be unsuccessful, lacking support from both the student body and the government, and was dissolved.

At Thap Kaew, Pin also arranged for the construction of the Sound Library, a remotely accessible on-demand audio collection. King Bhumibol Adulyadej donated recordings of his speeches to the library, and later remote access via radio from Bangkok was developed, but the library was not maintained after Pin's presidency ended and thus fell into disuse.

As minister, Pin also oversaw the construction of the Bangkok Planetarium, which opened in 1964, and of the new National Library building at Tha Vasukri, and the revival of the King's Scholarship, among other things. After his ministerial term ended in 1969, he served two terms as member of the Senate and another as a member of the National Legislation Assembly.

== Later life ==
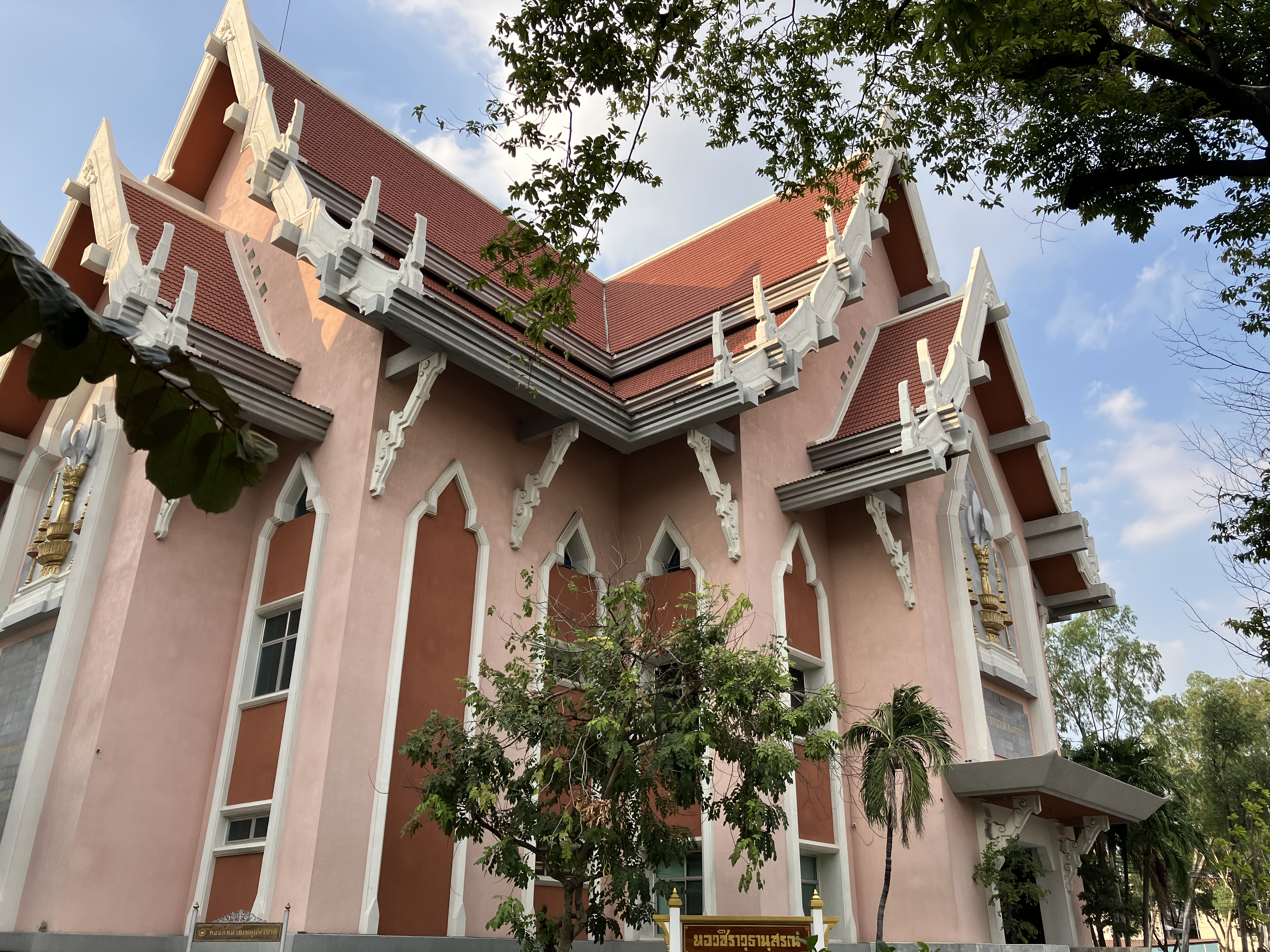
Pin sold part of his home to finance the construction of Vajiravudhanusorn Hall

Pin spent much of his retirement working on various tributes to King Vajiravudh, who had died while Pin was studying in England. In 1970 he began working with a few others with the intent to secure and catalogue the King's various literary works, some of which by then were at risk of disappearing. He and the group made records of Dusit Thani, obtaining old photographs and other documentation, and organised a "guided tour" of Dusit Thani of old in November that year, which was presented to Princess Bejaratana, among others.

The group's work continued, and the Fine Arts Department established it into an official committee, with Pin as chairman, to make preparations for the 100th anniversary of the King's birth, which would be recognised by UNESCO. Pin lobbied for the construction of Vajiravudhanusorn Hall, a museum displaying the King's works and duties, at the National Library. The hall was opened in 1981, despite budget problems during construction, which Pin had to sell part of the property on Damrongrak Road to help fund.

The committee also conducted research on the Wild Tiger Corps, and determined the location in Photharam District, Ratchaburi Province, of Ban Rai, where King Vajiravudh often set up camp with them. Pin initiated the construction there of a statue of the King in Wild Tiger Corps uniform, which was unveiled in 1988, and the surrounding area was developed into Khai Luang Ban Rai scout camp, which also contains a medical station and kindergarten.

He was also a member of the Committee for the Renovation of Sanam Chandra Palace, but did not live to see the restoration completed.

Mom Luang Pin Malakul died on 5 October 1995, at the age of 91.

== Literary works ==
During his years as Royal Page Student, Pin closely served King Vajiravudh and became learned in Thai literature. He was a prolific writer and produced a great number of literary works, including 25 compilations of poetic works, 57 works on education, 58 plays, 8 travel writings, and 56 other works. Among these are the following works in English:

- Writings on education

- Seminar on Rural Adult Education
- Education during the Time when H.H. Prince Dhani Was Minister of Public Instruction

- Plays

- School in the Village
- Somsak in Trouble

- Others

- Miscellaneous Problems (1960)
- Miscellaneous Problems or An Autobiography of a Would-be Mathematician (1972)
- The New Republic
- Dramatic Achievement of King Rama VI
- King Vajiravudh: Thailand's Prolific Writer

== Awards and recognition ==
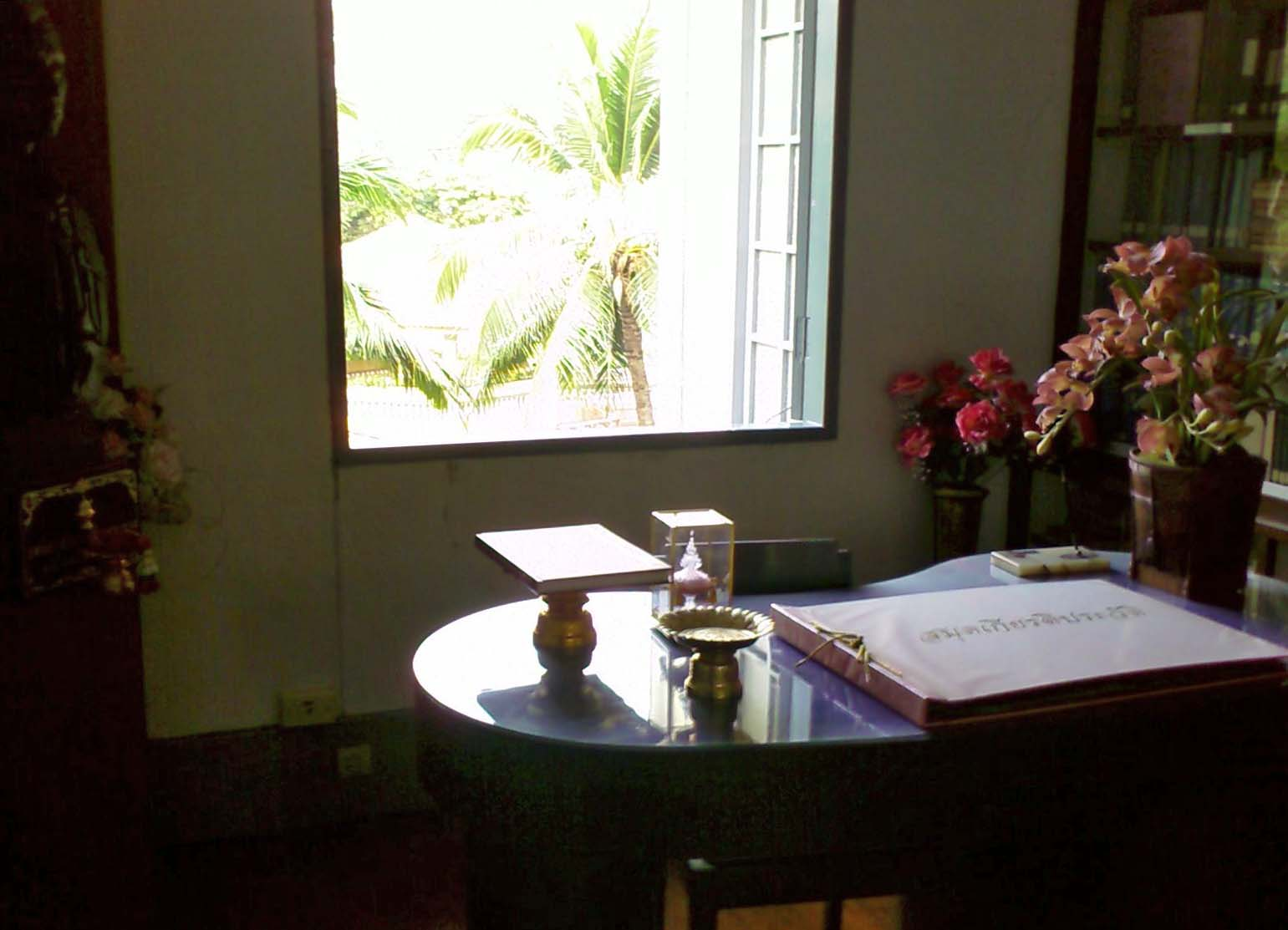
Room 57, Triam Udom Suksa School, Pin's former office

Pin was awarded the title of National Artist in Literature by the National Culture Commission in 1987 for his diverse contributions to the domain of Thai literature. He received the ASEAN Award in 1992 "for his outstanding achievements and contributions to literature". UNESCO celebrated the centenary of his birth in 2003, recognizing the value and impact of his contributions to the development of education in Thailand and Southeast Asia, and to the literary arts and the safeguarding and conservation of historical monuments and sites. On the occasion, Darakarn Building, the headquarters of UNESCO in Bangkok, was rededicated as the Mom Luang Pin Malakul Centenary Building and Room 57, Building 1 at Triam Udom Suksa School, Pin's former office, was set up as an archive of his original works.

Pin received various decorations and medals, including the Orders of Chula Chom Klao, the White Elephant, the Crown of Thailand and Ramkeerati, and the Dushdi Mala, Border Service, Chakrabarti Mala, Royal Cypher, Red Cross Commendation and Red Cross Awards Medals. Foreign decorations he received include the West German Federal Cross of Merit, Belgian Order of Leopold, Japanese Order of the Sacred Treasure, South Korean Order of Diplomatic Service Merit, and Republic of China Order of Brilliant Star.

He received honorary degrees from Chulalongkorn, Indiana, Silpakorn, Srinakharinwirot, Chiang Mai and Ramkhamhaeng Universities. He also served as Fellow and Honorary Fellow in Literature of the Royal Institute of Thailand and Honorary Member of the Education Society of Thailand. He was awarded the Elder Teacher's Pin and named Exceptional Contributor to National Education by the Teacher's Council of Thailand, and received the Golden Phra Kiao for outstanding contributions to the Thai language from Chulalongkorn University.
