= Queen Saovabha Memorial Institute =

Thai medical institute

Coordinates: 13°43′56.34″N 100°31′57.72″E

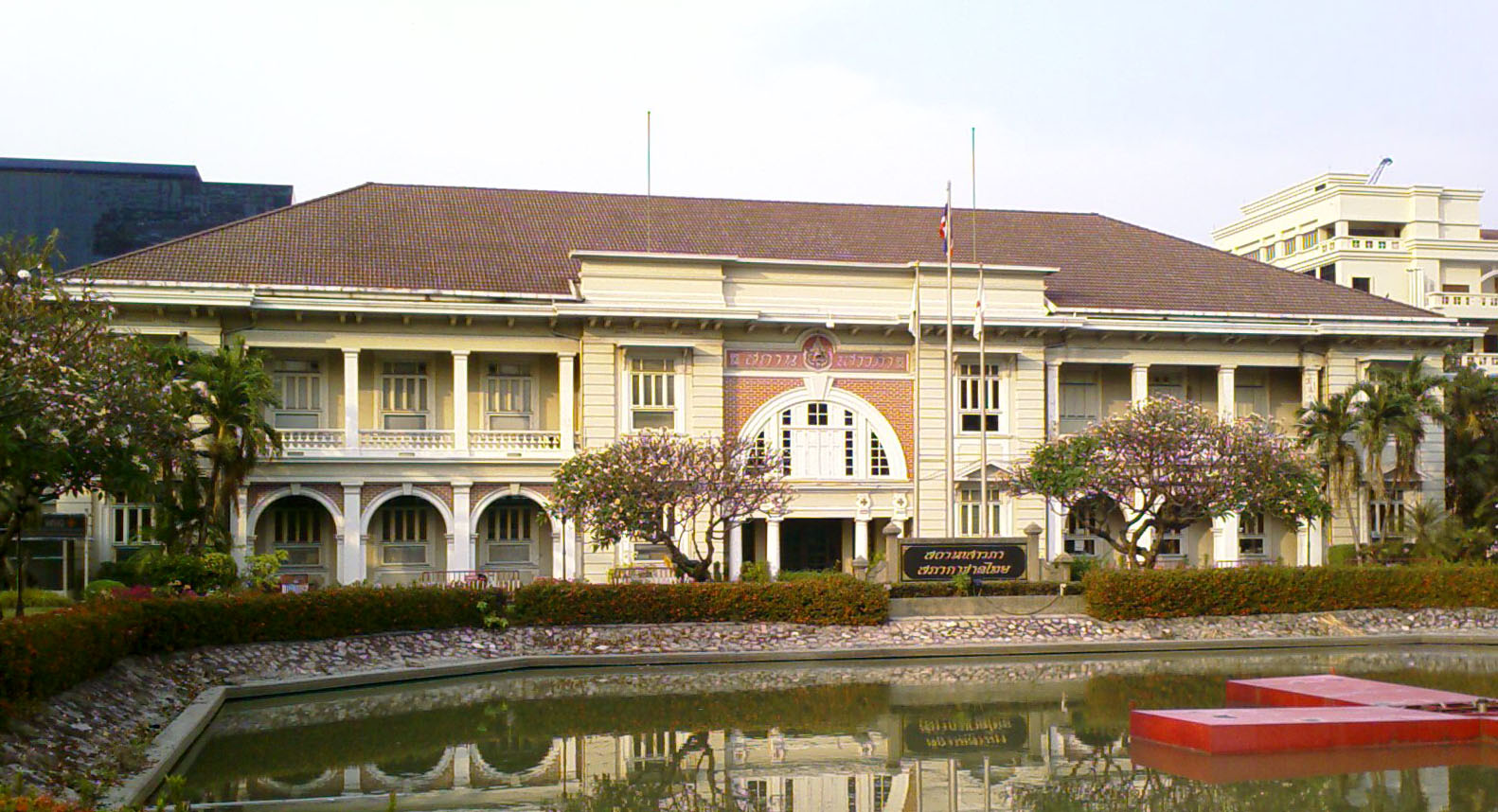
Queen Saovabha Memorial Institute, the Thai Red Cross Society

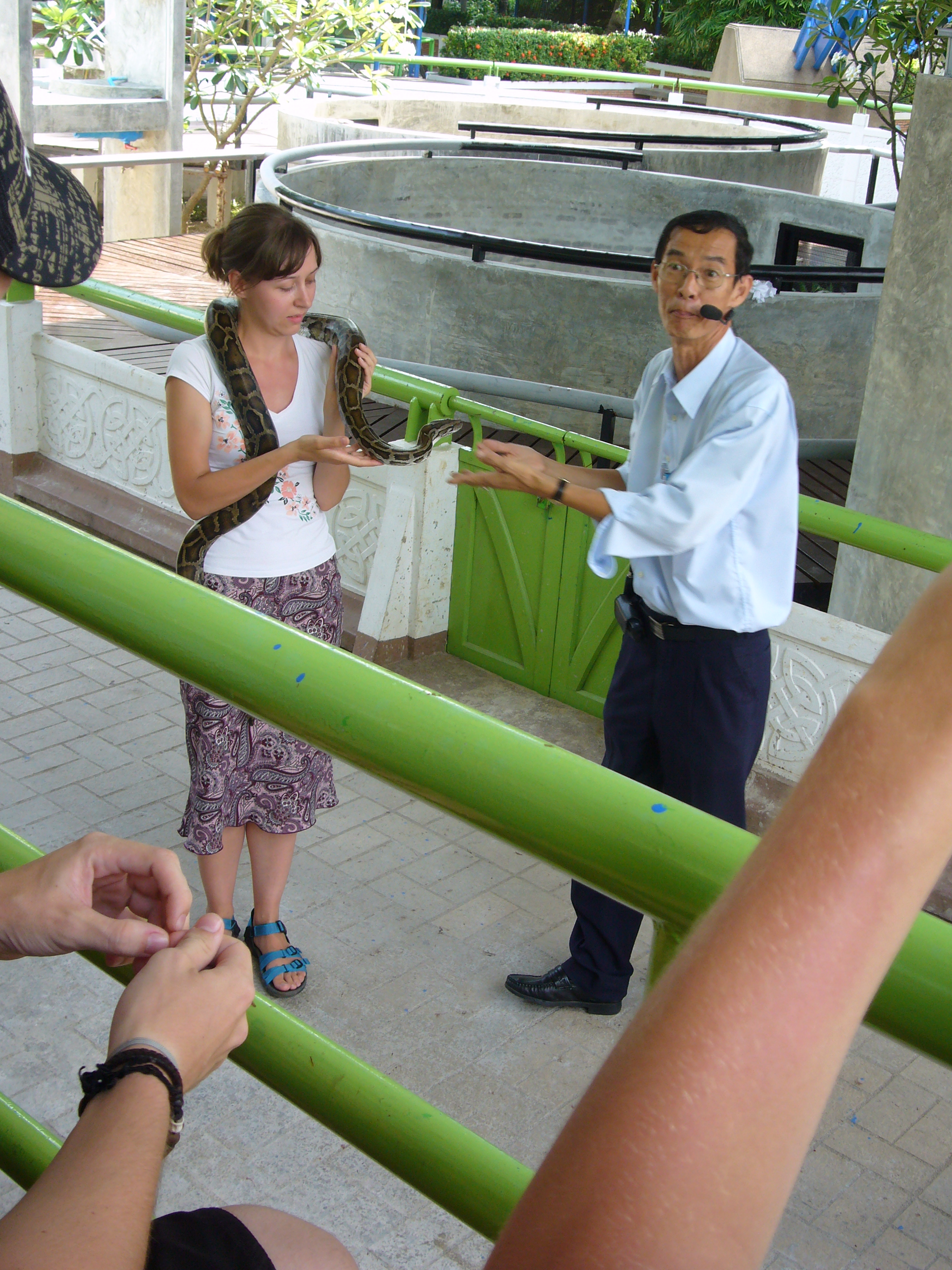
Afternoon educational snake show, a popular tourist draw

The Queen Saovabha Memorial Institute (QSMI) (Thai: สถานเสาวภา; RTGS: Sathan Saowapha) in Bangkok, Thailand, is an institute that specialises in the husbandry of venomous snakes, the extraction and research of snake venom, and vaccines, especially rabies vaccine. It houses the snake farm, a popular tourist attraction.

The origins of the institute can be traced back to 1912 when King Rama VI granted permission for a government institute to manufacture and distribute rabies vaccine at the suggestion of Prince Damrong, whose daughter, Princess Banlusirisarn, died from rabies infection. It was officially opened on 26 October 1913 in the Luang Building on Bamrung Muang Road as the Pastura Institute after Louis Pasteur, who discovered the first vaccine against rabies. In 1917 it was renamed the Pasteur Institute and placed under the supervision of the Thai Red Cross Society. The institute also produced vaccine against smallpox. The Travel and Immunization Clinic is now located here. If offers vaccines and pre-travel consultation.

In the early-1920s the king offered his private property for the construction of a new home for the institute on Rama IV Road. The new buildings were officially opened on 7 December 1922, now named for the king's mother, Queen Saovabha Phongsri. At the same time, the institute's first director, Dr. Leopold Robert, requested contributions from foreigners living in Thailand for the establishment of a snake farm, which would enable the institute to manufacture antivenom for snake bites. Reportedly the second snake farm in the world after Instituto Butantan in São Paulo, Brazil, it was opened on 22 November 1923 by Queen Savang Vadhana, then President of the Thai Red Cross, on the institute's premises.

Research into snake venom is highly important, since many people fall victim to venomous snake bites. Normally only an antidote that is based from the same snake's venom can save the individual's life.

The snake farm houses thousands of some of the most venomous snakes in the world, such as the king cobra and all sorts of vipers. Visitors can see handlers interact with pythons, and venom extractions can be seen. There is also a museum, and lectures are given.

The QSMI and the snake farm are near King Chulalongkorn Memorial Hospital, on the corner of Henri Dunant Road and Rama IV Road.
