= Triam Udom Suksa School =

State school in Bangkok, Thailand

- โรงเรียนเตรียมอุดมศึกษา

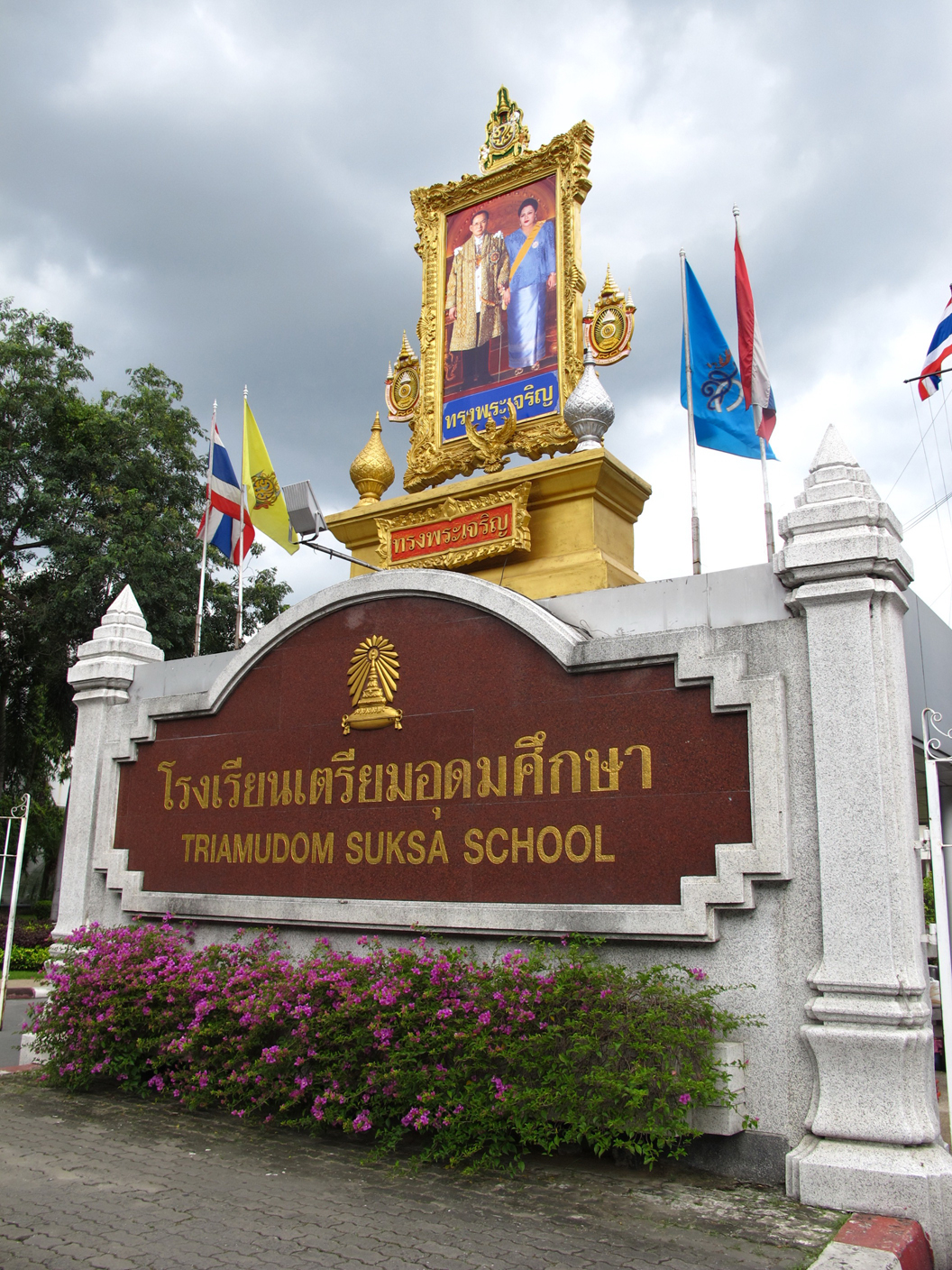

Location
- 227 Phaya Thai Road, Pathum Wan, Bangkok 10330; Thailand; 13°44′27″N 100°31′57″E

Information
- Former name: University Preparatory School, Chulalongkorn University
- Type: State school
- Motto: Nimittaṃ sādhurūpānaṃ kataññū kataveditā (Appreciation and reciprocation is an emblem of the good)
- Established: 3 January 1938; 88 years ago
- Founder: Pin Malakul
- Authority: OBEC
- Teaching staff: 219 (Note: 196 civil servants and 23 hired teachers, as of 2017.)
- Grades: 10–12 (mathayom 4–6)
- Gender: Coeducational
- Enrolment: 4,280 (2017 academic year)
- Classes: 111
- Campus size: 80 rai (13 ha; 32 acres) (Note: School publications give a school area of 80 rai, though this is likely a historical figure not accounting for later divisions of the plot. The current area is likely closer to 9.2 hectares (23 acres).)
- Colour: Pink
- Song: ปิ่นหทัย; Pin Hathai
- Website: www.triamudom.ac.th

Triam Udom Suksa School (Thai: โรงเรียนเตรียมอุดมศึกษา, pronounced [rōːŋ.rīa̯n trīa̯m ʔū.dōm sɯ̀k.sǎː]; lit.'university-preparatory school') is a state school in central Bangkok, Thailand. It admits upper-secondary students (mathayom 4–6, equivalent to grades 10–12) and has the largest yearly enrollment in the country. Founded in 1938 as a preparatory school for Chulalongkorn University, the school has long been regarded as the best secondary school in Thailand, and attracts students from all over the country in its highly competitive entrance examinations.

== History ==
The founding of Triam Udom Suksa School relates to the revised National Education Plan of BE 2479 (1936 CE), which imposed four and six years of primary and secondary education respectively, with an additional two years of pre-collegiate schooling required for students who were to pursue higher education. This pre-collegiate level was to be initially provided by the students' prospective universities, and accordingly the University Council of Chulalongkorn University authorised the establishment of such a school on 3 January 1938. The founding of the school, which took place over a tight time frame of three months, was overseen by Mom Luang Pin Malakul, then head of the university's teacher-preparation programme, who became the school's first director. The school took over the location of Mathayom Horwang School (of which ML Pin was also headmaster) on Phaya Thai Road in the vicinity of the university, and became known as the "University Preparatory School, Chulalongkorn University", or Rong Rian Triam Udom Suksa Haeng Chulalongkorn Maha Witthayalai (โรงเรียนเตรียมอุดมศึกษาแห่งจุฬาลงกรณมหาวิทยาลัย). The school, which was the first co-educational in the country, opened on 16 May 1938, and classes began on 19 May.

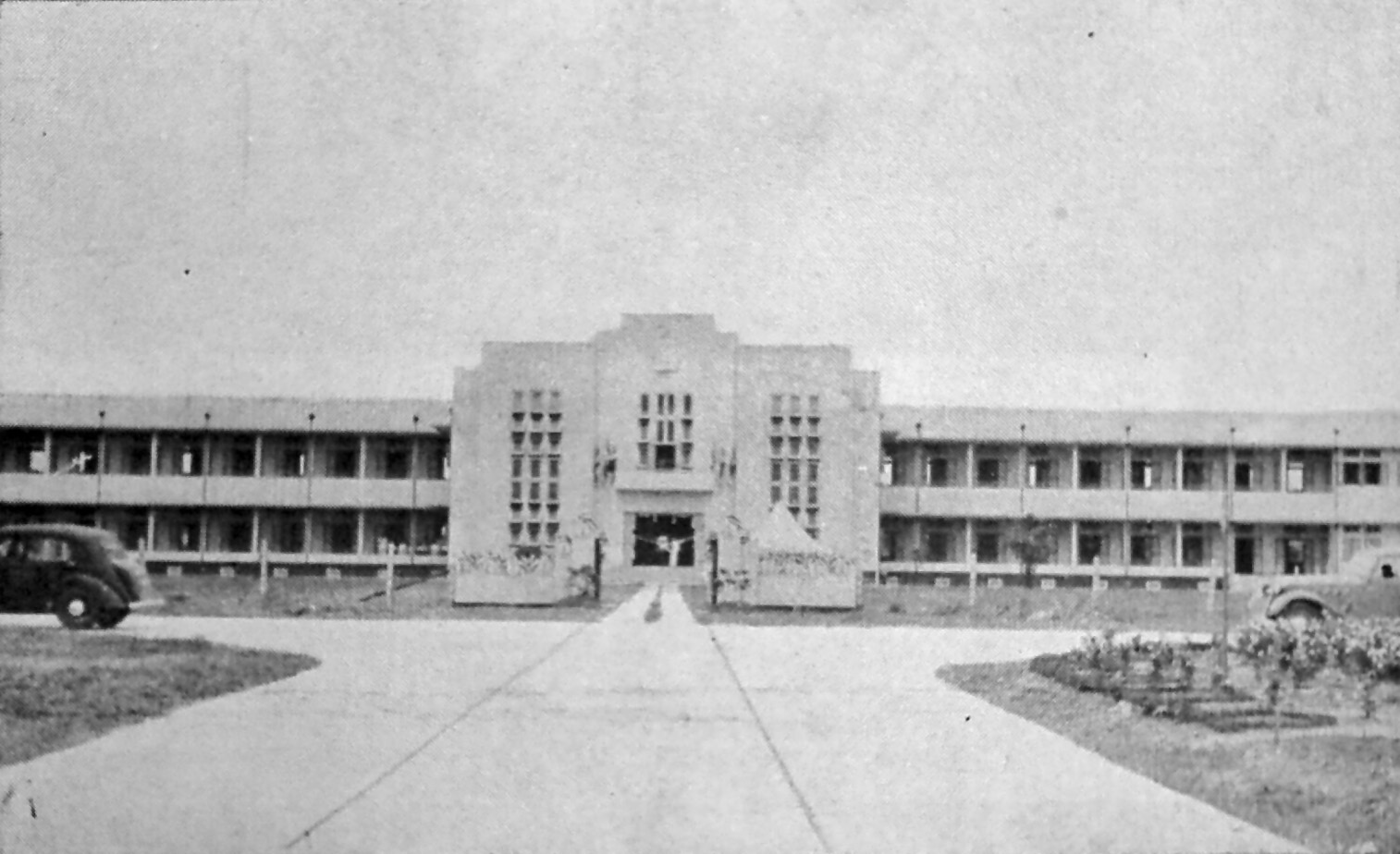
Triam Udom Suksa Building (now Building 2) during its opening ceremony on 24 June 1940

The school rapidly grew over the first few years, admitting up to 568 students in the 1940 academic year. In December 1941, the school was occupied by Japanese forces in the course of World War II, forcing the staff and students to relocate to temporary locations around Bangkok. Classes briefly returned to the school in 1943, but had to again leave after the school was damaged by Allied bombing on 19 January 1944. Part of the staff and students were transferred to various cities around the country, where preparations had already taken place for the establishment of additional preparatory school campuses. (Changes of government policy would however later cause these campuses to close down.) The school remained occupied even at the conclusion of the war, this time by Allied forces.

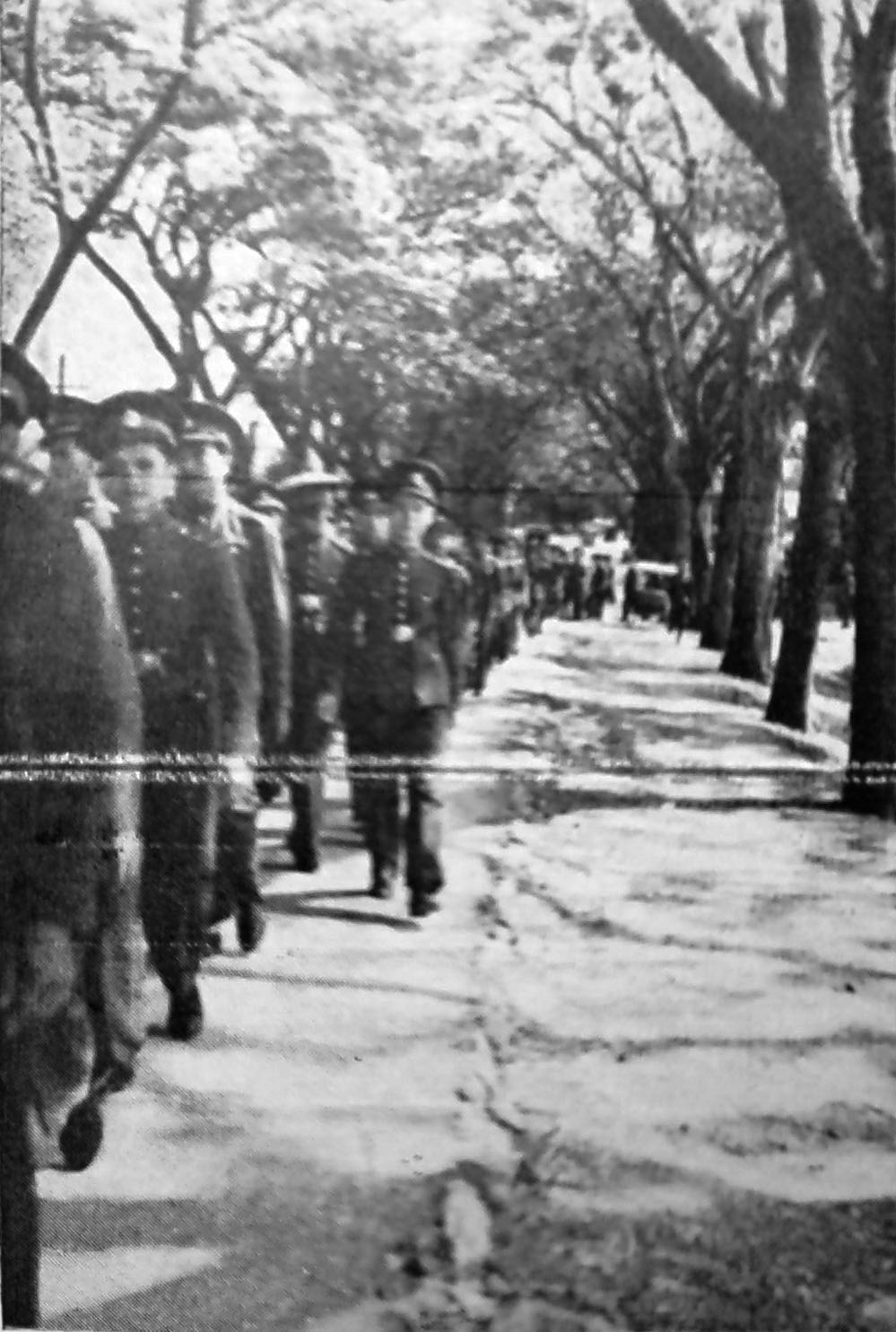
Class 1 graduates as they proceed towards the university campus during Chulalongkorn University's initiation ceremony, 1 June 1940

Teaching finally returned to normal in 1946 after Allied forces withdrew from the school. During that period, government policy favoured expanding pre-collegiate level teaching to public schools under the Department of General Education instead of being provided by the universities. As a result, authority over the school was transferred from Chulalongkorn University to the Department of General Education on 1 July 1947. The school's students have since been required to take university entrance examinations as regular students, and the name of the school was shortened to "Triam Udom Suksa School". The school, however, retained use of the Phra Kiao as its symbol.

In June 1947, just prior to the transfer, a Teacher Training Department was created under the school's authority to support the expansion of the national school system. This department, which became known as the Satit (demonstration) School, would extend teaching to mathayom 1–6 levels, and authority was transferred to the College of Education (now Srinakharinwirot University) in 1955. It presently exists as Patumwan Demonstration School. As Triam Udom is considered as the best high school in the country, Pathumwan Demonstration School ranked one of the best school as a biggest feeding school to Triam Udom in recent years.

The demand for pre-collegiate level schooling saw a sharp increase in the late 1950s, resulting in the Department of Secondary Education setting up special pre-collegiate schools within regular school campuses. Such a school was set up near Orachon Canal in the eastern portion of Triam Udom Suksa School in 1958, and became known as "Triam Orachon". Another campus, Triam Bang Pu, was established at Bang Pu Seaside Resort in Samut Prakan Province before being moved to Sam Phran District, Nakhon Pathom Province, and became known as Triam Udom Suksa Sam Phran School. Both schools were merged with Triam Udom Suksa by 1964.

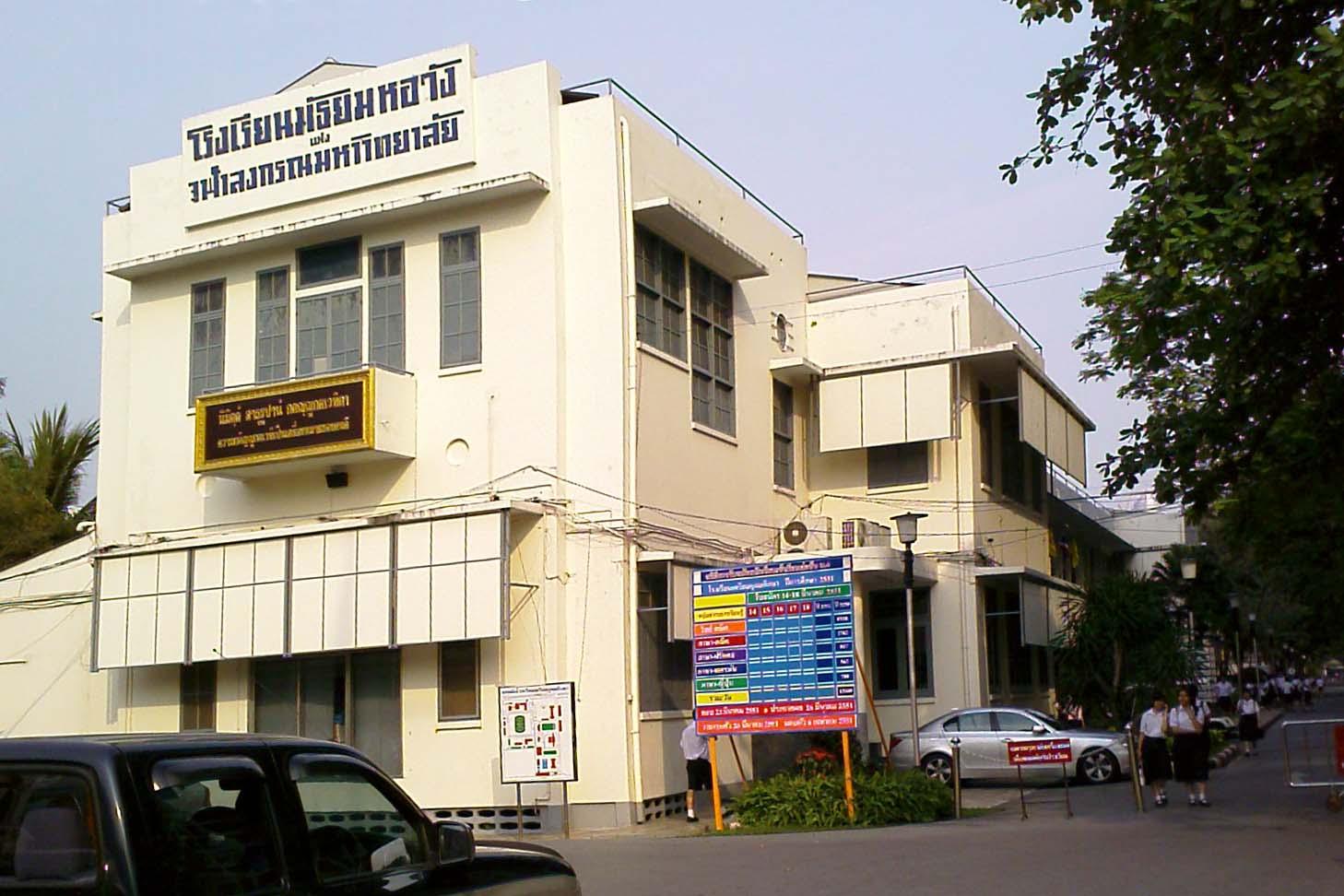
The name of Mathayom Horwang School is still displayed on the façade of Building 1.

In 1960, the national curriculum was rewritten, and the educational stages were redefined with seven years' primary education and five years of secondary education. Two years' upper-secondary education, mathayom 4–5, replaced the pre-collegiate level. The school now taught in this level, and classes were divided into arts, sciences and general departments. The curriculum would be changed again in 1981, introducing the current three-year upper-secondary level (mathayom 4–6).

Since the 1950s, the school staff have on multiple occasions been assigned by the Ministry of Education to assist other schools in staff training and teaching strategy development. In anticipation of the possible need to relocate in the 1970s, the school helped found the Bodindecha and Triam Udom Suksa Pattanakarn Schools in 1975 and 1978. Queen's College, Ratchaburi was established with like assistance in 1992.

The school saw further expansion in the 1980s, partly due to the new national curriculum, and now had ninety classes. Several new buildings were built, and modern facilities were introduced, including the introduction of computer classes in 1992. The school received awards from the Department of General Education in 1982 and 1985, and the school library won awards in 1990 and 1991. Students featured prominently in national stages, and since 1990 have continuously won medals at the International Science Olympiads.

At present, Triam Udom Suksa School educates upper-secondary students in the mathayom 4–6 levels. As of the 2017 academic year, there are 111 classes with 4,280 students and 219 teachers.

== Campus ==
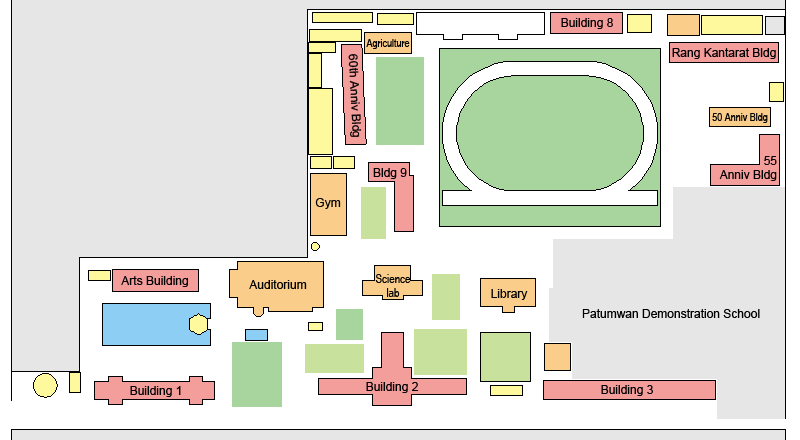
Campus plan

Triam Udom Suksa School is located at 227 Phaya Thai Road, Pathum Wan, Bangkok, amongst the campus of Chulalongkorn University. The school occupies 80 rai (13 ha; 32 acres) between Phaya Thai and Henri Dunant roads, and shares borders with the Patumwan Demonstration School of Srinakharinwirot University and the Uthenthawai Campus of Rajamangala University of Technology Tawan-ok, in addition to the many faculties of Chulalongkorn University.

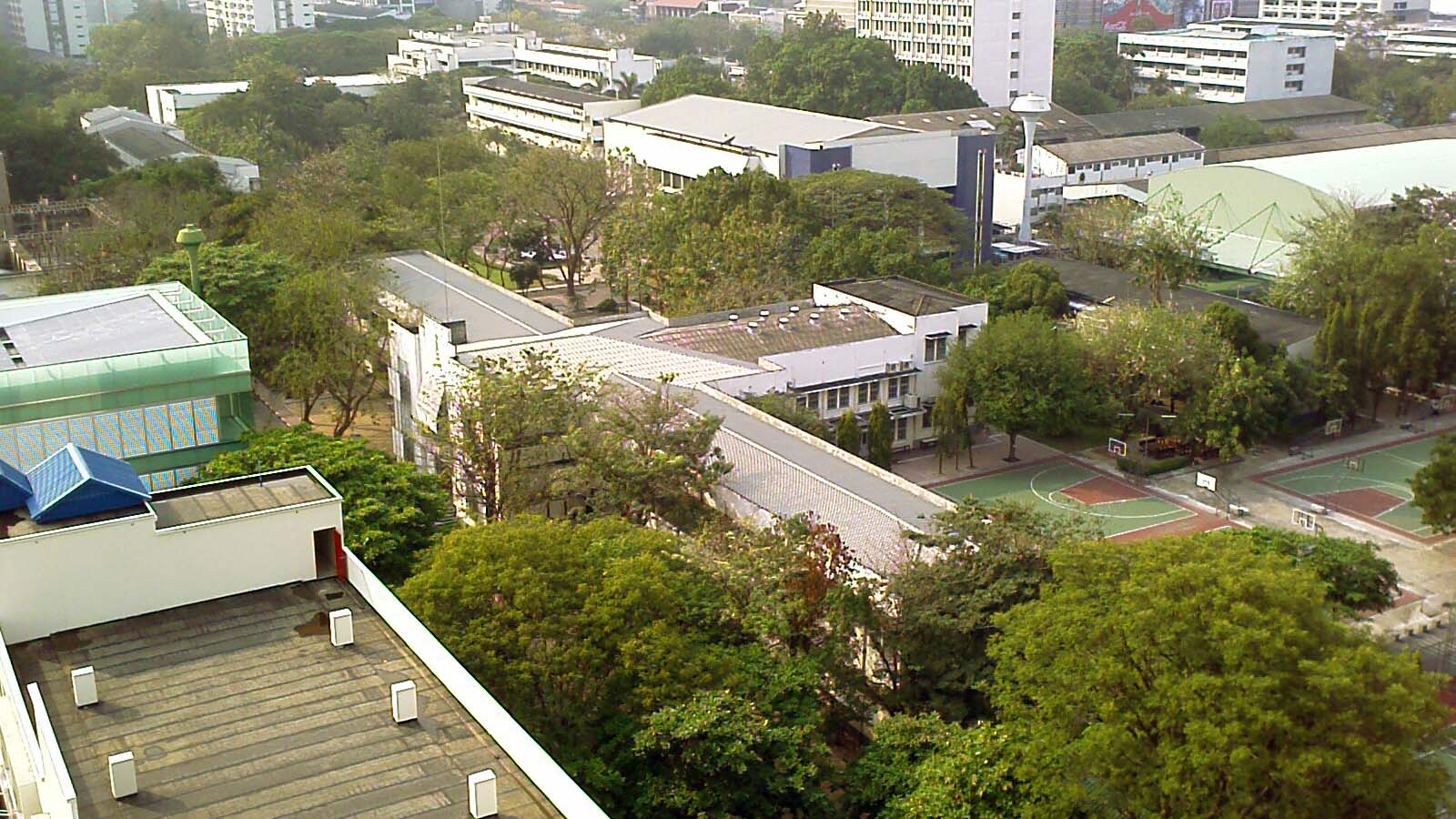
Bird's-eye view of the school area, with Building 2 at the centre

The school has sixteen buildings, nine of which hold classrooms. The oldest buildings are lined along the school's main roadway which connects the two major roads bordering the school. The other buildings are scattered around the school campus, which is dominated by the sports field.

The oldest building, Building 1, was built in 1935 as the new site for the Mathayom Horwang School of Chulalongkorn University when it relocated from its former Windsor Palace site, and has been home to Triam Udom Suksa School since 1938. Designed with influences from the De Stijl movement by Italian architect Ercole Manfredi, it is regarded as the first use of modernist architecture in a Thai educational building. Construction of Building 2, originally known as Triam Udom Suka Building and serving as the school's main building, followed in 1938. It was designed by Thai engineer Kimchuang (Kanchana) Hengsuwanit. Building 3, also designed by Manfredi, was built in 1940.

The other classroom buildings are Khun Ying Rang Kantarat Building, Building 9, the Arts Building, the 55th, 60th, and 81st Anniversary Buildings, and Queen Sirikit's 72nd Anniversary Building. Other buildings include the library (Building 4), auditorium, science labs (80th Anniversary Building), gymnasium, Building 8, and the 50th Anniversary Building, which holds many of the student clubs.

== Curriculum ==
The school's curriculum is based on the Basic Education Core Curriculum B.E. 2551 (2008 CE), and provides three years of upper-secondary education, mathayom 4–6. Subjects are grouped into eight learning areas, namely Thai language; mathematics; science; social studies, religion and culture; health and physical education; arts; vocations and technology; and foreign languages.

Upon admission, students choose a concentration path which determines the subjects they take. All students take the same basic subjects in all eight areas. Additional courses follow the three major concentrations: science–mathematics, language–mathematics, and language (chosen among French, German, Japanese, Spanish, Chinese or Korean). Additional elective subjects are available depending on the students' major. An additional number of activity hours, consisting of guidance class and clubs, are also required.

Admission to the school is mainly through examinations, although there are also designated quotas for students with specific abilities and achievements. The examination process is highly competitive; nearly 14,000 students applied for 1,520 available seats in the 2026 academic year, the highest record for the school in 18 years.

== Academics ==
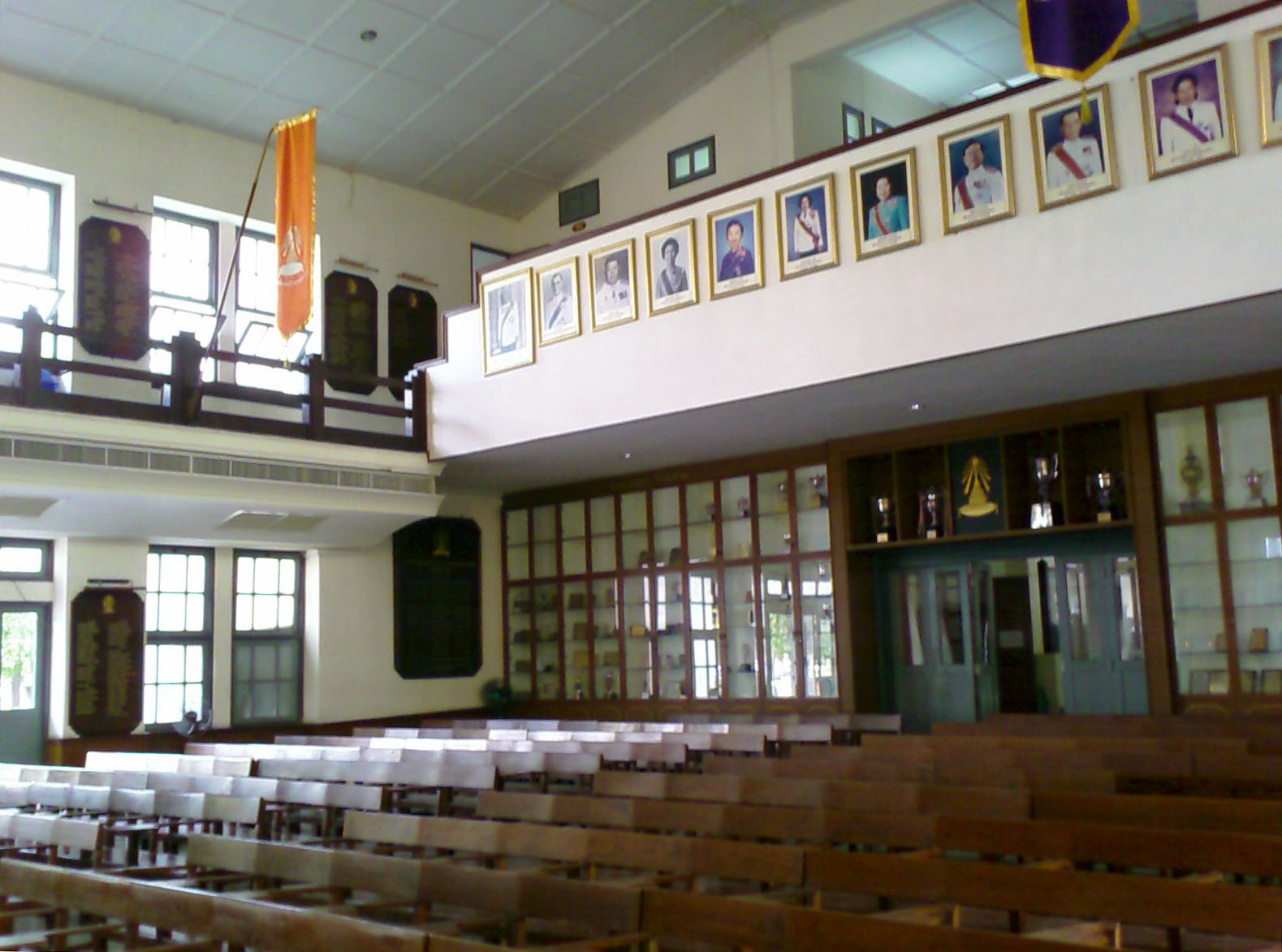
Room 111, with its display of trophies and name plaques honouring top graduates, King's Scholarship recipients and International Science Olympiad medallists

Triam Udom Suksa School has among the highest national standardized test scores in the country, competing only with Mahidol Wittayanusorn School for the top rank. In the 2005 academic year (the last where national rankings were publicly announced), Triam Udom Suksa had the highest mathayom 6 O-NET (Ordinary National Educational Test) average scores in the subject areas of Thai language, social studies and English language, while ranking second after Mahidol Wittayanusorn in mathematics, science and the total average. (Note: In the 2016 academic year, Triam Udom Suksa students averaged 81.62, 58.56, 79.77, 74.86 and 59.64 points in Thai, social studies, English, mathematics and science, respectively, losing to Mahidol Wittayanusorn in the four subject areas except English. (Mahidol Wittayanusorn had average scores of 82.73, 59.77, 79.49, 94.36 and 71.47, respectively.))

The school's culture tends to highly value academic achievements, although its students have also excelled in many other extracurricular activities. Recipients of the King's Scholarship and medal-winners in the International Science Olympiads—national stages in which the school has long dominated—are honoured in the school's hall of fame, Room 111.

Triam Udom Suksa is also a partner school of the Schools Partners for the Future initiative by the German Ministry of Foreign Affairs.

== Extracurricular activities ==
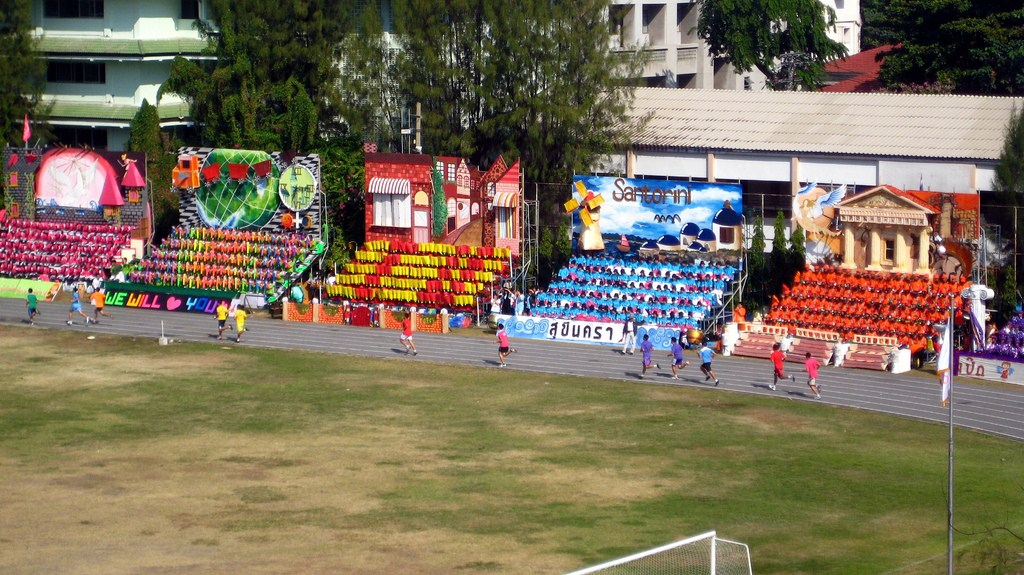
Sports day events include track events and audience performances.

Student activities are mostly structured around the elected student committee and the 43 student clubs supported by the school (of which membership in at least one is mandatory, with one timetable period per week designated for club activities). Among the various clubs are the Thai Traditional Music Club, whose mahori ensemble has won multiple national championships, the Triam Udom Suksa "Wing!" Symphony Orchestra, which won first prize in the 8th Asian Symphonic Band Competition 2006, and the French Chorus of Triam Udom Suksa, which has also won multiple competitions, including Princess Maha Chakri Sirindhorn's Cup in 2006, 2009, 2010 and 2012. Students regularly participate in regional and national academic competitions; the school team is usually a major player in the televised Shell Quiz programme.

As with many other schools in Thailand, a major event the student body participates in is the annual sports festival, an elaborate event for which each class building spends months in preparation, and includes competitions not only in athletics but also parade and audience displays.

In recent years, Triam Udom Suksa students have also produced science projects competing on the international level, winning awards from the Intel International Science and Engineering Fair in 2004, 2006 and 2007.

== Sister school ==
=== Japan ===
- The High School and Junior High School of University of Hyogo
  - cultural exchanges starts at 2001
  - establish a collaborative international partnership at 2009

== Notable alumni ==
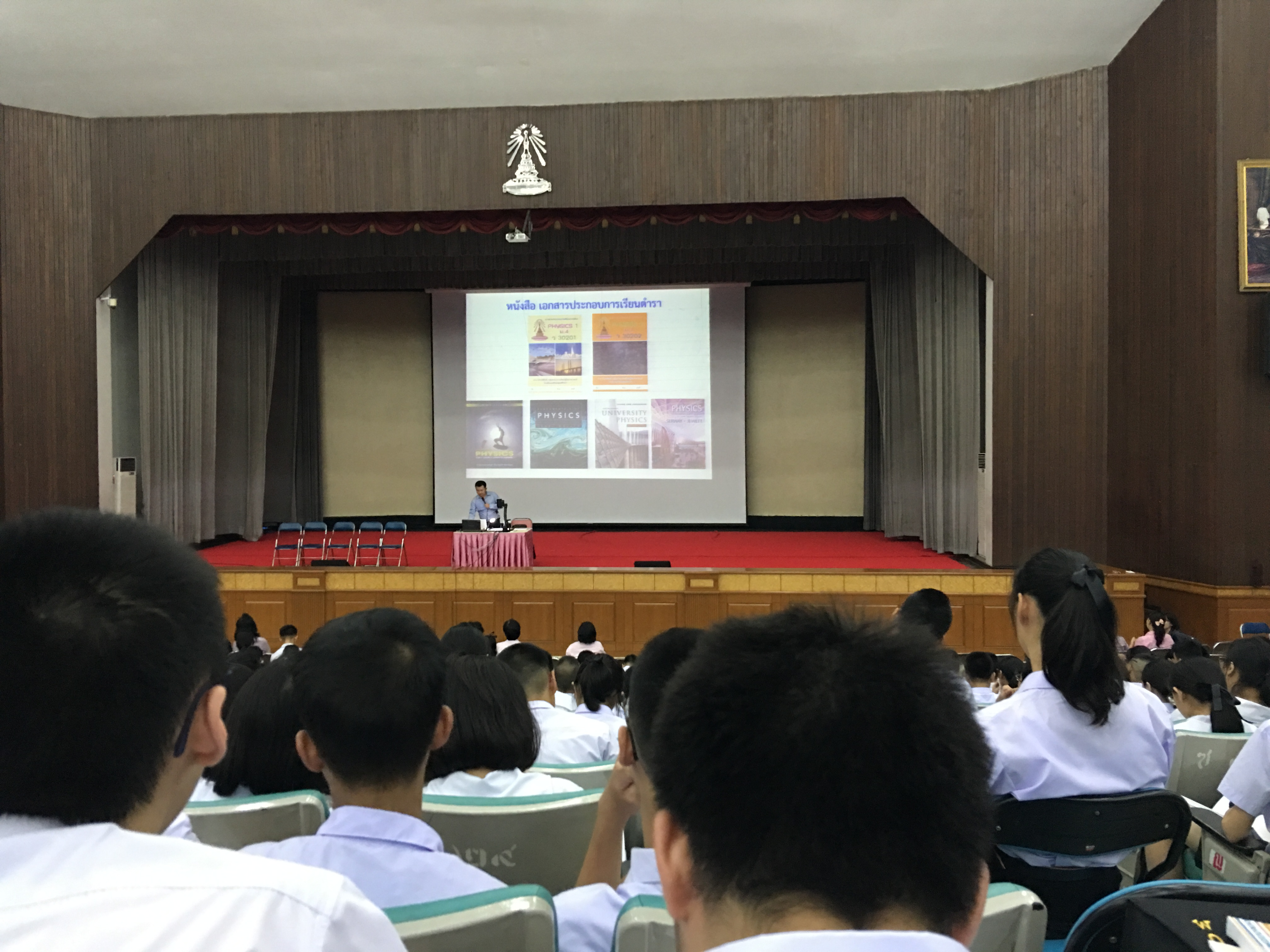
School auditorium, 2016

- Ajin Panjapan, National Artist in literature
- Ampol Senanarong, privy councillor
- Apirak Kosayothin, 14th Governor of Bangkok
- Arthit Urairat, deputy president of the Democrat Party, Director of Rangsit University, 17th Speaker of House of Representatives, 25th Minister of Foreign Affairs, 33rd Minister of Public Health, 18th Minister of Science, Technology and Environment
- Borwornsak Uwanno, constitutional law professor, 18th Secretary-General to the Cabinet, former Secretary-General of King Prajadhipok's Institute
- Chadchart Sittipunt, Minister of Transport, 17th Governor of Bangkok
- Chaovana Nasylvanta, privy councillor
- Chavalit Yongchaiyudh, 22nd Prime Minister of Thailand
- Chit Phumisak, author
- Chulanope Snidvongs Na Ayuthaya, privy councillor
- Chumpol Silpa-archa, politician, former minister and deputy prime minister
- Dasanavalaya Sorasongkram, daughter of Princess Galyani Vadhana
- Jaruvan Maintaka, former Auditor-General of Thailand
- Kalaya Sophonpanich, politician, Minister of Education
- Kamthon Sindhvananda, privy councillor
- Kaset Rojananin, 16th Chief of the Defence Forces, one of the 1991 coup leaders
- Kittiratt Na-Ranong, former Deputy Prime Minister, 49th Minister of Finance
- Narikun Ketprapakorn, actress, and doctor
- Pakorn Chatborirak, actor.
- Patrick Nattawat Finkler, actor, singer, dancer, songwriter, model, and former member of INTO1
- Prawase Wasi, Ramon Magsaysay awardee
- Sippanondha Ketudat, physicist, Honorary Fellow of the Royal Society of Thailand, 24th Minister of Education, 30th Minister of Industry
- Somkid Jatusripitak, former Deputy Prime Minister, 41st Minister of Finance, 50th Minister of Commerce
- Prince Subhadradis Diskul, art historian, archaeologist
- Supachai Panitchpakdi, 4th Director-General of the World Trade Organization, 9th Secretary-General of the UN Conference on Trade and Development, former Deputy Minister, 46th Minister of Commerce
- Surapong Suebwonglee, former Deputy Prime Minister, 1st Minister of Information and Communication Technology, 45th Minister of Finance
- Suriya Jungrungreangkit, former Deputy Prime Minister, 39th Minister of Industry, 41st Minister of Transport
- Suchai Charoenratanakul, former Deputy Prime Minister, 40th Minister of Public Health
- Tamarine Tanasugarn, tennis player
- Tarisa Watanagase, 18th Governor of the Bank of Thailand
- Thanathorn Juangroongruangkit, politician and founder of the Future Forward Party
- Vachirawit Chivaaree, actor
- Yongyuth Wichaidit, former Deputy Prime Minister, 49th Interior Minister, former Chairman of Pheu Thai Party

== Directors ==
Years in office	Name
1938–1944	Mom Luang Pin Malakul
1944–1951, 1963	Sanan Sumitra
1951–1962	Sanguan Leksakul
1964–1975	Khun Ying Boonluean Kruatrachue
1975–1979	Khun Ying Suchada Thirawat
1979–1989	Khun Ying Phanchuen Ruensiri
1989–1997	Khun Ying Phannee Kanchanavasit
1997–1999	Somphong Dhamma-upakorn
1999–2001	Asawin Wanwinwet
2001–2005	Phannee Phengnet
2005–2008	Pisawas Yutithamdamrong
2008–2013	Witsaruth Sonthichai
2013–2018	Poramet Molee
2018–2020	Sophon Kamon
2020-2022	Wandee Naksukpan
2022–present	Boonyapong Bhothiwatthanat
