= My Engineer =

2020 Thai television series

- Official series poster
- Thai: My Engineer มีช็อปมีเกียร์มีเมียรึยังวะ
- Genre: BL
- Written by: Mommae
- Directed by: Lit Samajarn
- Starring: Patpasit Na Songkhla; Kritsanapong Soonthornchatchawet; Talay Sanguandikul; Nakhun Screaigh; Naphat Chalermphonphakdee; Ryan Peng; Nutchapol Cheevapanyaroj; Nutthapong Phibunthanakiet
- Opening theme: คนที่ฉันรอ (The person I waited for) by MOD3G x Joelong
- Ending theme: รักไม่มีกฎเกณฑ์ (Love Without Rules) by Ton Thanasit
- Country of origin: Thailand
- Original language: Thai
- No. of episodes: 14

Production
- Production location: Thailand
- Running time: 45 minutes
- Production company: Tri Creation

Original release
- Network: Tencent Video
- Release: 14 March – 30 May 2020

My Engineer (Thai: My Engineer มีช็อปมีเกียร์มีเมียรึยังวะ; My Engineer has a shop, has a gear, has a wife yet?) is a 2020 Thai boys' love television series starring Patpasit Na Songkhla and Kritsanapong Soonthornchatchawet . The series was directed by Lit Samajarn, who is the also the director of SOTUS. The series premiered in Thailand and aired from March 14, 2020, to May 30, 2020. It was renewed for a sequel. A three-episode vlog of the cast members vacation was released on YouTube from June 13, 2020, to June 27, 2020, with the title My Engineer Summer Trip.

== Synopsis ==
As a revenge for injuring his nose, the popular senior Engineering Student Bohn asks Duen (a first-year medical student) to bring a flower to him every morning for a month. Further story explains how they fall for each other slowly. Meanwhile, the story also dwells around the relationship between King (Bohn's friend) and Ram (Duen's friend). The story also unfolds Mek's unrequited love for Boss; both of them are Bohn's friends. Finally, the series explores the relationship between Frong, a Business student with Thara, a senior of Duen.

== Cast ==
- Patpasit Na Songkhla (Cooper) as Bohn
- Kritsanapong Soonthornchatchawet (Poy) as Duen
- Talay Sanguandikul (Lay) as King
- Nakhun Screaigh (Perth) as Ram
- Naphat Chalermphonphakdee (Inntouch) as Boss
- Ryan Peng as Mek
- Nutchapol Cheevapanyaroj (Shane) as Frong
- Nutthapong Phibunthanakiet (MD) as Thara
- Atchari Siriboonphiphatana (Sosave) as Tee
- Nam Kankulnut as Ting
- Natid Kaveekornwong (Rice) as Tang
- Supatad Pongchaipoom (Toto) as Phu
- Alexander Bryant (Dylan) as Ruj (Ram's brother)
- Machida Sutthikunphanit (Maki) as Daoheni (Duen's sister)
- Aydin Cerrillo as Ben (Bohn's nephew)
- Kotnok Sukthangwong as Fon (Boss's Ex)
- Thanyadit Thanatnat (Ko) as First (Frong's brother)
- Tak Ninmon Bunsachai as Khamfa (King's sister)
- Thonwak Hatlinha (Tiger) as Mild
- Jirapat Phanngern as Duen's father
- Aa Rachameth Chaipichayarat as Ram's father
- Am Chonwari Chutiwatkhotrachai as Duen's mother
- Maniyanan Limsawat as Frong's mother
- Sunotri Chotiphan as King's mother
