= Patumwan Demonstration School, Srinakharinwirot University =

Public school in Pathumwan, Bangkok, Thailand

- โรงเรียนสาธิตมหาวิทยาลัยศรีนครินทรวิโรฒ ปทุมวัน

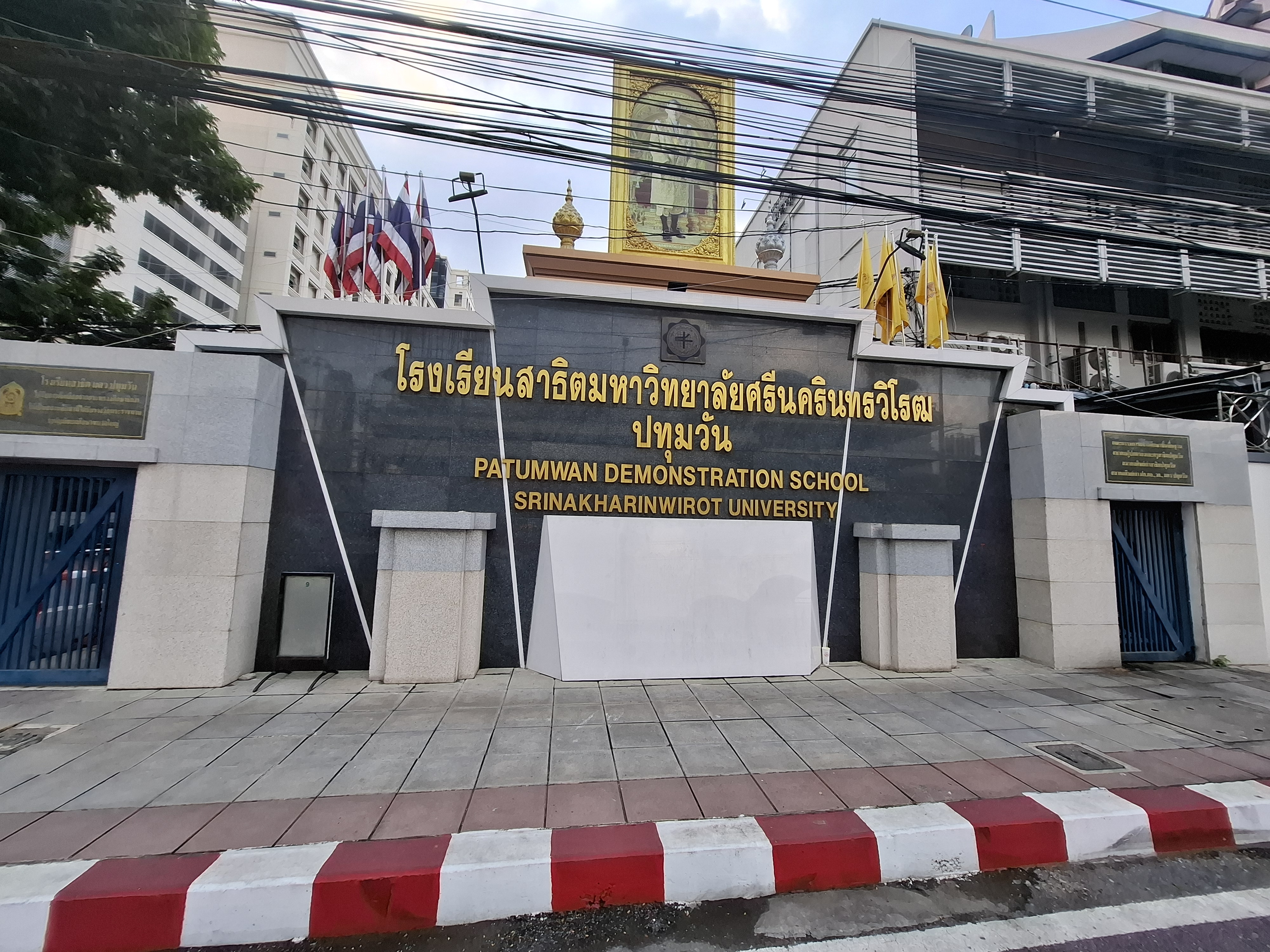

Location
- 2 Henri Dunant Rd., Pathum Wan; Bangkok, 10330; Thailand; 13.740318°N 100.534984°E

Information
- Other names: Satit Patumwan, Patumwan, PDS
- Type: Public school
- Motto: Pali: Sikkhā viruḷhi sampattā Thai: การศึกษาคือความเจริญงอกงาม (Education is Growth)
- Religious affiliations: Buddhist, Hinduism (de facto)
- Established: 26 December 1953; 72 years ago
- Founder: Pin Malakul
- Authority: Faculty of Education; Srinakharinwirot University
- Director: Chotivit Tumsujit
- Gender: Coeducational
- Age range: 13–18
- Enrolment: 1,854 (2006)
- Capacity: 1,860
- Language: Thai
- Campus: Patumwan
- Campus size: 12080 m^{3}
- Campus type: Downtown
- Colours: Indigo and Pink
- Slogan: Thai: สมรรถภาพในการปรับตัว คือความสำเร็จในชีวิต (Self-adjustment is the most important element of a successful life) (Note: Translation varies widely. Whist the aforementioned slogan is preferred and presented on school's front gate. The school merchandise prefers alternative translation; "Adaptability leads success".)
- Song: Thai: สาธิตปทุมวัน (Satit Patumwan)
- Yearbook: Thai: บัว (Lotus)
- School fees: ฿25,700 per year
- Alumni: Satit Patumwan Alumni
- Website: www.satitpatumwan.ac.th

Patumwan Demonstration School, Srinakharinwirot University (Thai: โรงเรียนสาธิตมหาวิทยาลัยศรีนครินทรวิโรฒ ปทุมวัน), commonly known as Satit Patumwan (Thai: สาธิตปทุมวัน), is a 13-18 public school in Pathum Wan District, Bangkok, Thailand. It was founded in 1953 by Pin Malakul as Secondary educators’ training department, Demonstration Unit, Triam Udom Suksa School (Thai: หน่วยสาธิต แผนกฝึกหัดครูมัธยม โรงเรียนเตรียมอุดมศึกษา), making it the oldest demonstration school in Thailand.

Patumwan Demonstration School's campus is adjacent to Chulalongkorn University and Triam Udom Suksa School on Henri Dunant Road, Pathum Wan District in the heart of the city's commercial district.

== Education ==
The school's Mathayom 1-6 students comprise 50 classes; 38 regular program classes and 12 in the English program. It accepts regular admission to mathayom 1 and 4. In the junior years (mathayom 1–3) the syllabus is uniform for all the students, but in the senior years (mathayom 4–6) the school's syllabus is divided into four programs with different subjects:

- Science–Mathematics
- Mathematics-Arts (English)
- Mathematics-Arts (German/French/Japanese/Chinese)
- Arts–Mathematics (English)*

The difference between science–mathematics and art programs is that art programs do not include science subjects in the syllabus. The program is focused on the study of liberal arts. Each student has a choice of foreign language, but the science–mathematics student has English as the only language option. Programs are chosen by the student entering Mathayom 4 and can't be changed until graduation. The programs are aimed to aid the students during their university periods, even in the stage of entrance preparation.

== English Program (EPTS) ==
Patumwan Demonstration School has an English program, established in 1997, teaching most core subjects in the English language called the EPTS (English Program for Talented Students). The EPTS program is available to all grades and must be chosen prior to admission. It has two classes in each grade, with around 35 students a class.
