= Srinakharinwirot University =

University in Thailand

- มหาวิทยาลัยศรีนครินทรวิโรฒ
- Logo of Srinakharinwirot University, resembling exponential growth
- Former names: Higher Teacher Training School; College of Education
- Motto: Sikkhā Viruḷhi Sampattā (Pali) การศึกษาคือความเจริญงอกงาม (Thai)
- Motto in English: Education is Growth
- Type: Autonomous public university
- Established: June 29, 1974
- Affiliations: ASAIHL
- Chairman: Dr. Chumpol Phornprapha
- President: Prof. Dr. Cholvit Jearajit
- Royal conferrer: Maha Chakri Sirindhorn, Princess Royal of Thailand on behalf of the King
- Students: 25,000
- Location: Bangkok, Thailand
- Campus: Prasarnmit campus 13.745557°N 100.564810°E; Ongkharak campus 14.107418°N 100.982080°E
- Colours: Grey (colour)|Grey, red
- Website: www.swu.ac.th

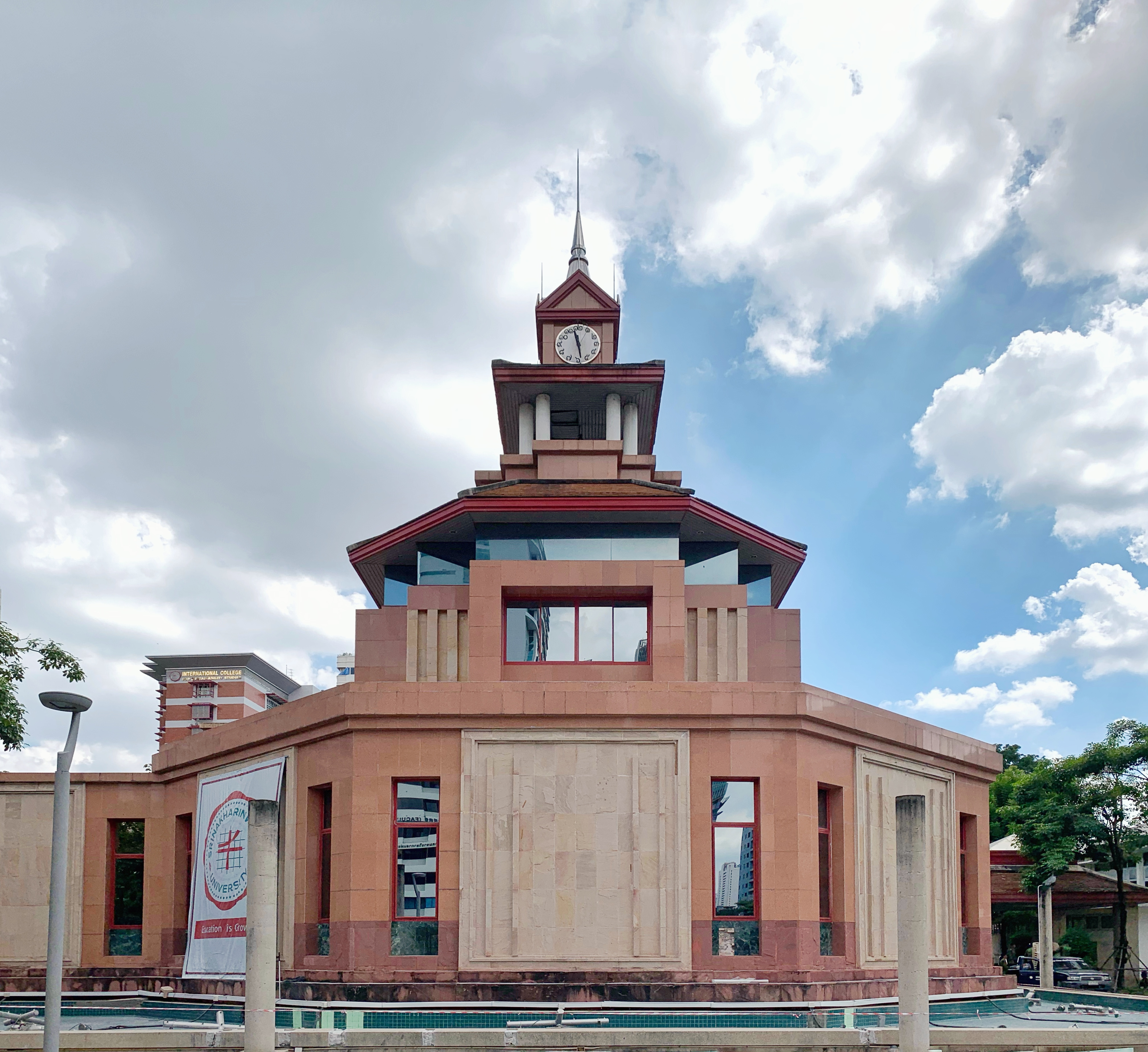
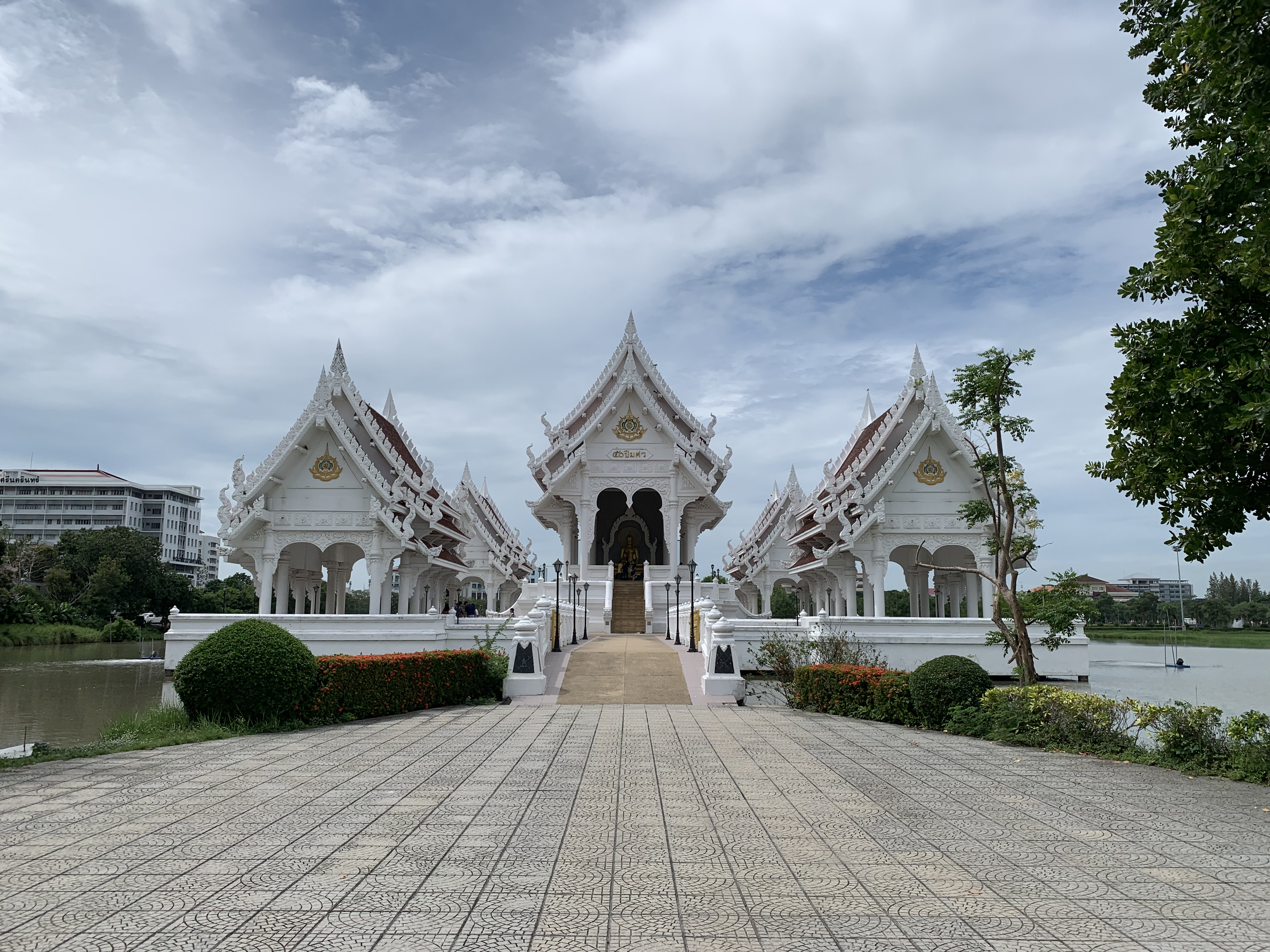
Prasarnmit Campus (left), Buddharupa Shrine of Ongkharak Campus (right)

Srinakharinwirot University (abbr: SWU; Thai: มหาวิทยาลัยศรีนครินทรวิโรฒ; abbr: มศว) is a public autonomous university in Bangkok, Thailand. Founded in 1949, the university was the first upper-education institution to concentrate solely on teacher training. Srinakharinwirot University has two campuses; Prasarnmit Campus in Bangkok's Watthana district and Ongkharak Campus in Nakhon Nayok province's Ongkharak district. Other minor campuses include Bhodivijjalaya College’s campuses in Sa Kaeo province and Chiang Mai province’s Mae Chaem district.

The university originally had 8 regional campuses; Prasanmitr, Pathumwan, Bang Saen, Phitsanulok, Maha Sarakham, Songkhla, Bang Khen and Phala Suksa (lit. Physical Education). The Prasanmitr campus remains the headquarter of the university, whilst Pathumwan Campus now exists as its teaching school, Patumwan Demonstration School. Some were later established as new universities; Burapha University (formerly Bang Saen Campus), Naresuan University (formerly Phitsanulok Campus), Mahasarakham University (formerly Mahasarakham Campus) and Thaksin University (formerly Songkhla Campus). The Bang Khen Campus was closed, moving to the main Prasarnmitr Campus, its former land is now occupied by the Phranakhon Rajabhat University. Lastly, the Phala Suksa Campus was closed and moved to Ongkharak Campus, being renowned as Faculty of Physical Education.

The university's motto "Education is Growth" resembles the initial aim of teacher training and is illustrated through the logo resembling the exponential graph, meaning the exponential growth.

== History ==
The university had its beginnings when the Higher Teacher Training School at Prasarnmit was founded in 1949. Prasarnmit was the first of its kind in the country's history. In 1953, it became the College of Education, having authority to grant a bachelor's degree in Education in the subject majors taught in Thai primary and secondary schools. Subsequently, programs at both the bachelors and masters levels were developed. In 1964, branch campuses were established for the regions of the country. The following were eventually created:

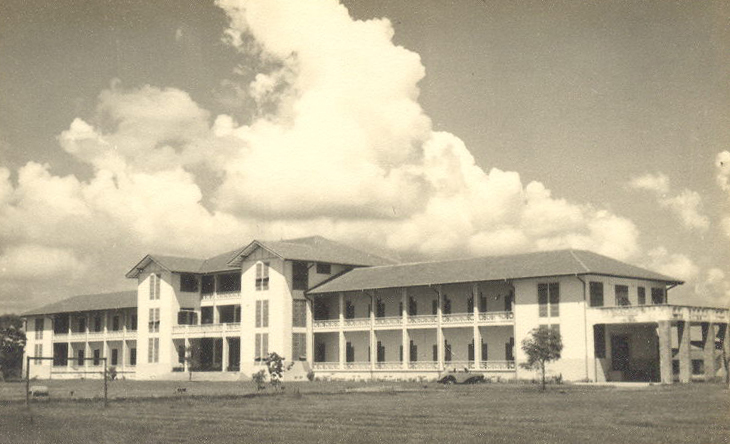
Prasarnmitr Building in 1980

- Phitsanulok campus, for the north, now Naresuan University
- Maha Sarakham campus, for the northeast, now Mahasarakham University
- Bangsaen campus, for the southeast, now Burapha University
- Songkhla campus, for the south, now Thaksin University

Additional central campuses were also established:

- Pathumwan campus, now merged with Prasarnmit campus
- Physical Education campus, now merged with Faculty of Physical Education, Ongkharak campus
- Bang Khen campus, now merged with Prasarnmit campus

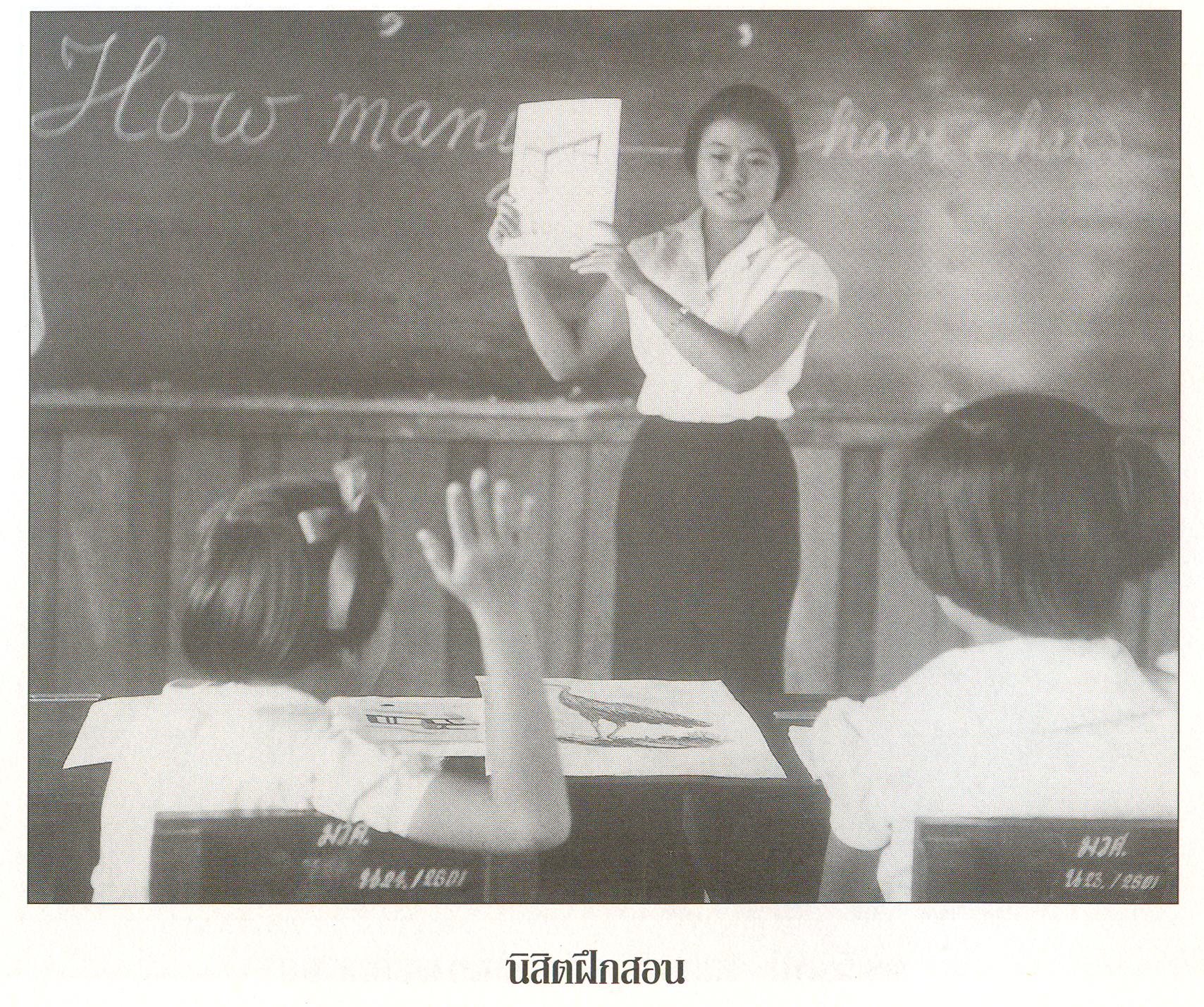
A trainee teacher of Srinakharinwirot University in the past

In 1974, the College of Education became a comprehensive university by a royal decree of King Bhumibol Adulyadej, who granted the university the name of Srinakharinwirot (See-na-ka-reen-wee-rot), which means 'the glory of the city'.

The university offered undergraduate degrees in education, humanities, social science, science, physical education, and graduate degrees in education. In the higher education development plan Phase Five (1982–1986), a faculty of medicine was added; in Phase Seven (1992–1996), engineering, fine arts, and dentistry; and in Phase Eight (1997–2001), pharmacy, health science, and nursing. SWU Prasanmit has developed to be a metropolitan university focusing on graduate studies. SWU Ongkaruk has focused on the development of health science, technology, environment and community services.

Over the years, the regional campuses grew in size and became separate universities. However, they preserve an unofficial tie with Srinakarinwirot University and regard the Bangkok university as their "mother campus".

== Affiliations ==
=== Faculties ===
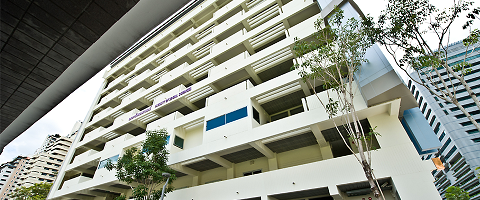
Faculty of Social Sciences

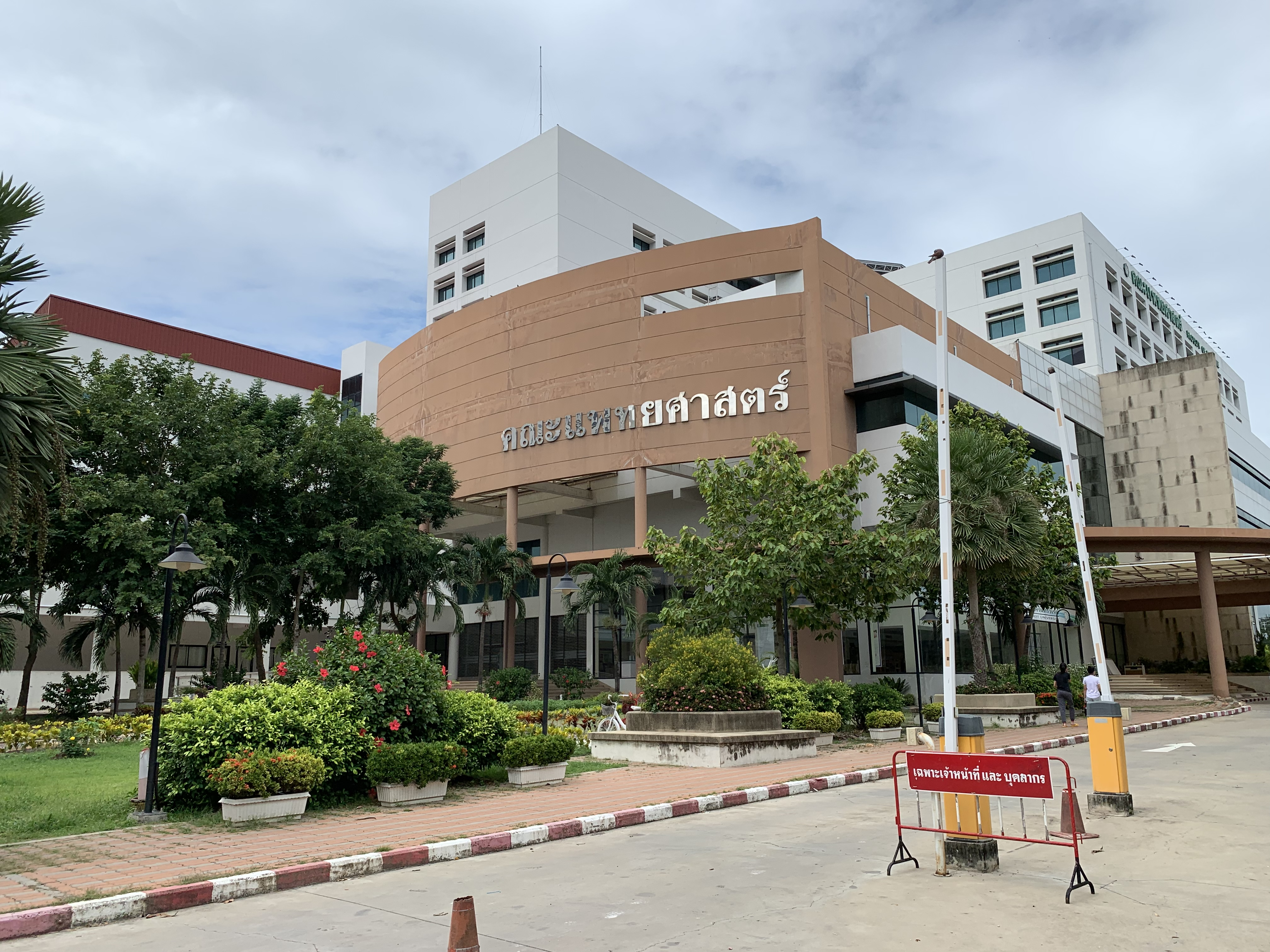
Faculty of Medicine

- Faculty of Education
- Faculty of Economics
- Faculty of Humanities
  - Literature
  - Language
  - History
  - Philosophy
  - Psychology
  - Information studies
  - Language for careers (International)
  - Language for communication (International)
- Faculty of Fine Arts
  - Visual Arts
  - Products Design
  - Fashion Design
  - Jewelry Design
  - Interior Design
  - Communication Design
  - Acting and Directing
  - Theater Design
  - Thai Dance
  - Western Dance
  - Music
  - Arts and Cultural Management Innovation
  - Art Education
  - Music Education
  - Thai Dance Education
- Faculty of Social Sciences
- Faculty of Physical Education
  - Sports and Exercise Science
  - Public Health
  - Recreation Leadership
  - Physical Education
  - Health Education
  - Health Education and Physical Education
- Faculty of Science
- Faculty of Medicine
  - HRH Princess Maha Sirindhorn Medical Center, Nakhon Nayok
  - Panyananthaphikkhu Medical Centre Chonlaprathan, Nonthaburi
- Faculty of Nursing
- Faculty of Pharmacy
- Faculty of Dentistry
- Faculty of Physical Therapy
- Faculty of Engineering
- Faculty of Agricultural Product Innovation and Technology
- Faculty of Environmental Culture and Ecotourism
- Faculty of Business Administration for Society

=== Colleges ===
- International College for Sustainability Studies
- College of Social Communication Innovation
- Bodhivijjalaya College
- College of Creative Industry

=== Schools ===
- The Graduate School
- School of Economics and Public Policy

=== Institutes/centers ===
- Behavioral Science Research Institute
- Institute of Culture and Arts
- Educational Research Development and Demonstration Institute
- Strategic Wisdom and Research Institute
- Research and Development Institute for Special Education
- Educational and Psychological Test Bureau
- Computer Center
- Center for Educational Media and Technology
- Central Library
- Innovation Learning Center
- Science Education Center

=== Demonstration schools ===
- Prasarnmit Demonstration School, Srinakharinwirot University (Elementary)
- Prasarnmit International Programme, Srinakharinwirot University (Elementary)
- Prasarnmit Demonstration School, Srinakharinwirot University (Secondary)
- Patumwan Demonstration School, Srinakharinwirot University
- Prasarnmit International Programme, Srinakharinwirot University (Secondary)
- Ongkharak Demonstration School, Srinakharinwirot University
- Princess Srinagarindra Demonstration School Maecheam, Chiangmai, Bodhivijjalaya College, Srinakharinwirot University
