= 30th Jaturamitr Samakkee =

(2023) 30th Jaturamitr Samakkee
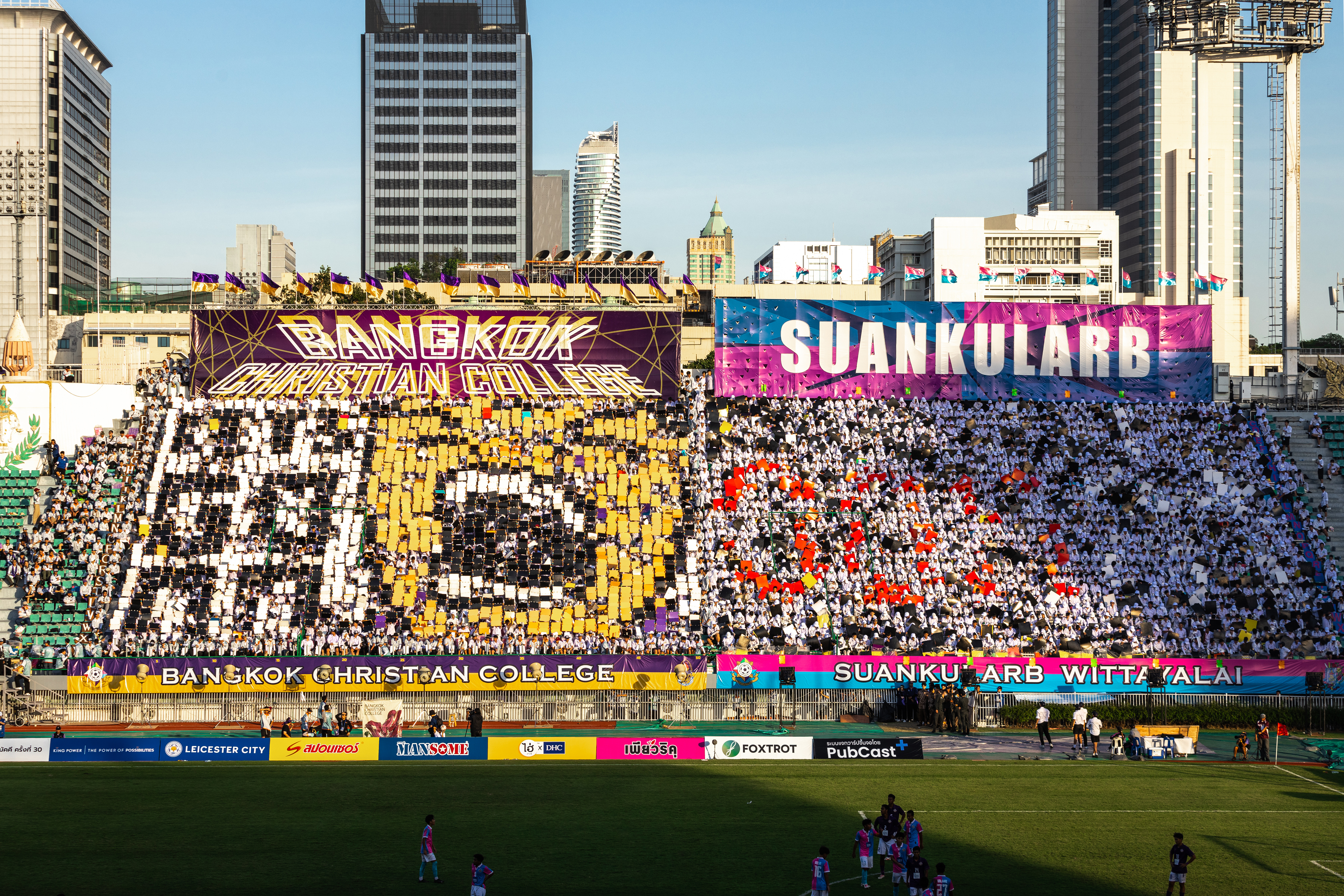
- 1:1 Card stunt between Bangkok Christian College and Suankularb Wittayalai School

Tournament details
- City: Bangkok
- Dates: 11–18 November 2023
- Teams: 4 Assumption College; Bangkok Christian College; Suankularb Wittayalai School; Debsirin School (Host)
- Venue: Suphachalasai Stadium

Tournament statistics
- Matches played: 8
- Goals scored: 32 (4 per match)
- Best player(s): Walakorn Saila (Forward); Wichan In-aram (Defender)

The 30th Jaturamitr Samakkee was the 30th Jaturamitr Samakkee with Assumption College, Bangkok Christian College, Suankularb Wittayalai School, and Debsirin School (Host) participating. It was held between November 11 and November 18, 2023, at Suphachalasai Stadium.

The 30th Jaturamitr Samakkee originally was intended to be held on November 13, 15, 17, and 20, 2021, but due to the ongoing COVID-19 pandemic in Thailand, which is still in a state of worry, the organizing committee decided to postpone the tournament to 2023. Later, the date for the tournament was announced to be November 12, 14, 16, and 18, 2023.

== Tournament statistics ==
=== First round ===
Position	Team	Played	Won	Drawn	Lost	Goals for	Goals against	Goal difference	Points
1	Suankularb Wittayalai School	3	3	0	0	6	1	+5	9
2	Bangkok Christian College	3	1	1	1	3	2	+1	4
3	Debsirin School	3	1	1	1	4	5	-1	4
4	Assumption College	3	0	0	3	3	8	-5	0

11 November 2023	Suankularb Wittayalai School	2–1	Bangkok Christian College	Suphachalasai Stadium
13:00	Setthawut Phongchitsuphap 54', 77'		Kunakorn Suwankumar 76' (Self-sabotage)	Referee: Songkran Boonmeekiat

11 November 2023	Assumption College	3–4	Debsirin School	Suphachalasai Stadium
16:00	Panithi Senaphakdee 7'; Asari Uma 66'; Namchok Kritsanachandee 90+5'		Paphawit Toron 10'; Soffan Sanron 45'; Worawi Miren 85'; Worachot Songsri 87'	Referee: Wiwat Champa-on

13 November 2023	Assumption College	0–2	Suankularb Wittayalai School	Suphachalasai Stadium
13:00			Peerathat Praephan 60', 70'	Referee: Chairuek Ngamsom

13 November 2023	Debsirin School	0–0	Bangkok Christian College	Suphachalasai Stadium
16:00				Referee: Wiwat Champa-on

15 November 2023	Assumption College	0–2	Bangkok Christian College	Suphachalasai Stadium
13:00			Thanakorn Duangpaeng 59'; Setthaphong Sathorn 90+3'	Referee: Pawara Srichan

15 November 2023	Suankularb Wittayalai School	2–0	Debsirin School	Suphachalasai Stadium
16:00	Chokchai Toyale 33'; Siwarut Siemmai 90+7'			Referee: Winat Phophat

=== 3rd place champions round ===
18 November 2023	Debsirin School	5–2	Assumption College	Suphachalasai Stadium
13:00	Soffan Sanron 26', 45+2'; Siriwit Wongprapai 40'; Paphawit Toron 67'; Thanusak Kaewprasong 86'		Namchok Kritsanachandee 12', 14'	Referee: Niwat Insaard

=== Champions round ===
18 November 2023	Suankularb Wittayalai School	0–0	Bangkok Christian College	Suphachalasai Stadium
16:00				Referee: Songkran Boonmeekiat

== Best athlete awards ==
School	Player
Bangkok Christian College	Walakorn Saila
Debsirin School	Thanwa Hongvientiane
Suankularb Wittayalai School	Kirati Khambaeng
Assumption College	Panithi Senaphakdee

== Fair play award ==
- Assumption College

== Controversies ==
=== Forced card stunt performance ===
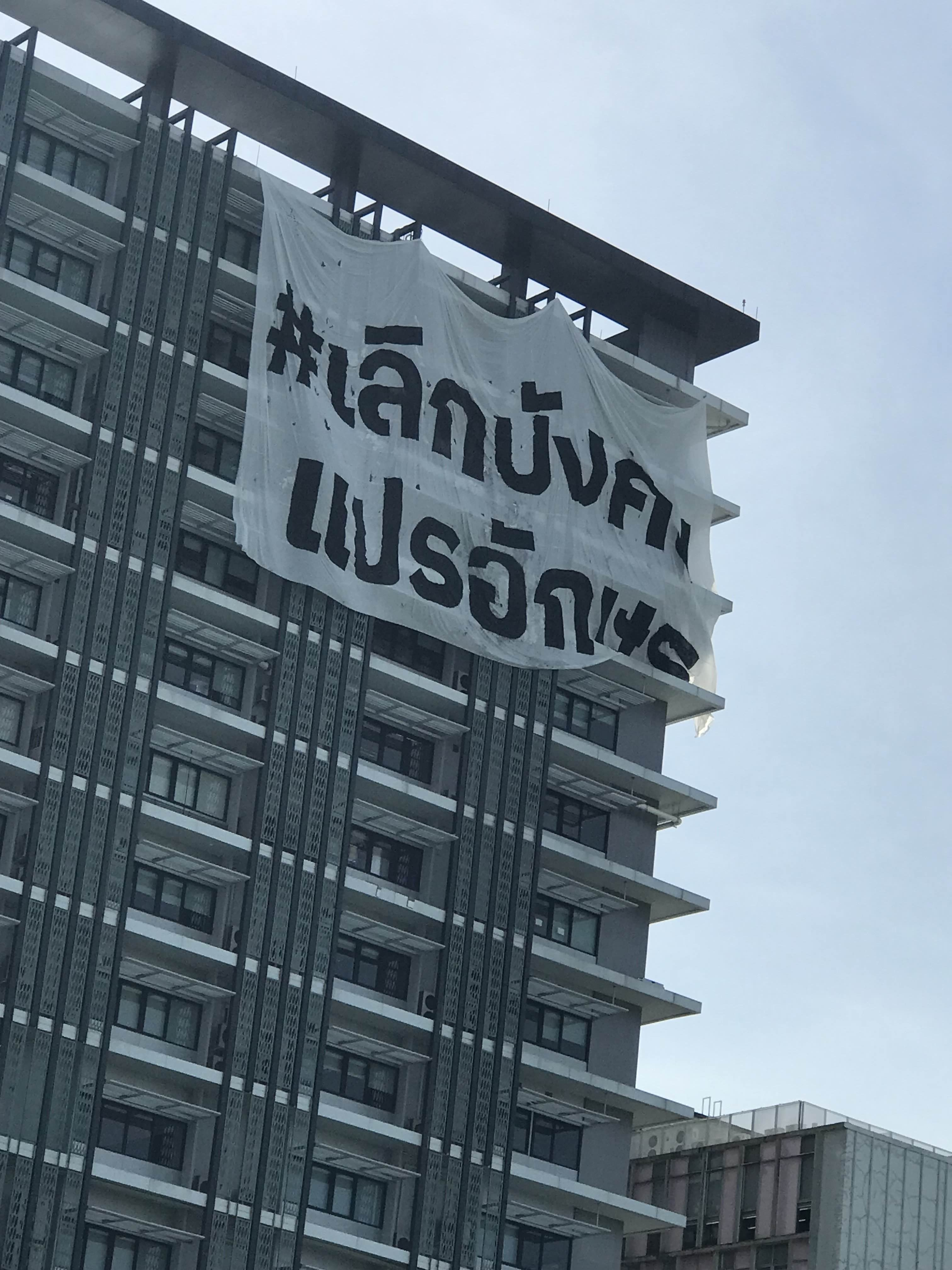
The protest sign held up on the side of a building.

Every two years, students are forced to register for card stunt performances at the stadium, often being forced to sit for upwards of 11 hours in the same seat with little to no ability to move in unfavorable weather conditions, resulting in a lot of heatstroke-related illnesses. A sign was held up on the side of a nearby building, saying "#เลิกบังคับแปรอักษร" or "#Stop forced card stunt performances" in English, protesting against said topic. It was taken down as quickly as it took to hold it up.

== See also ==
- Jaturamitr Samakkee
