= Football in Thailand =

Football In Thailand
- 1st game in Country
- (Thailand) Ministry of Education XI vs British in Bangkok XI (United Kingdom) (1900)
- Governing body: Football Association of Thailand
- Top leagues (National Leagues): Thai League 1 Thai League 2 Thai League 3 Futsal Thai League; Thai Women's League
- FA Cup: Thai FA Cup
- League Cup: Thai League Cup; Thai League 3 Cup
- Season starter: Thailand Champions Cup

International
- 1st international
- (Thailand) Siam 3-2 (France) French Indochina (Saigon; 14 April 1930)
- Men's team: Thailand
- Women's team: Thailand ♀
- Boys' team (youth): Thailand U-17; Thailand U-20; Thailand U-21; Thailand U-23
- Girls' team (youth): Thailand U-17 ♀ Thailand U-20 ♀
- Stadium: Rajamangala Stadium (Capacity: 51,552)

International honours
- AFF Championship: Gold (7) – 1996, 2000, 2002, 2014, 2016, 2020, 2022 (men's)
- AFC Women's Cup: Gold (1) – 1983 (women's)

Football is the most popular sport in Thailand. Approximately 30% of the people in Thailand are considered association football fans. In neighbouring countries Cambodia, Laos and Myanmar, the percentages are relatively comparable.

Although the professional football leagues are new to Thai people, football was introduced to Thailand as far back as 1897. Many Thais also watch football on local and paid-cable TV. Many matches, especially those in the English FA Premier League can be watched free on local channels. Thai channels broadcast every match of the 2006 World Cup.

Football in Thailand is organised by Football Association of Thailand (FAT).

In 2007, Thailand co-hosted the Asian Cup 2007 with three other countries. This was the second time the event had been held in Thailand, the first being in 1972.

The most popular football clubs in Thailand are Premier League clubs Liverpool and Manchester United and Thai League 1 club Buriram United.

== History ==
Football was introduced into Thailand in 1897 by the Siamese-English Students. After that Football was popular in the Royal students and the Armies. First Association football matches in Thailand was held in 1900 by the English people in Siam between Bangkok Team against Ministry of Education Team. The result is 2-2. In 1901 student association football tournament by Ministry of Education has established.

In 1915, first official association football club tournament in Siam was officially founded. It's call "The Royal Golden Trophy". Later this tournament becomes to Kor Royal Cup. Later the first national team match has begun. The match between Siam National Team and Royal Sports Club by the English Players. The winner are the Siamese Footballer by 2-1

In 1916, King Vajiravudh founded "The Football Association of Thailand under Patronage of His Majesty the King."

The first Siamese match against National Team as long as can be founded by historical evidence was in 1930, between Siam and French Indochinese Union Team with the state visit of King Prajadhipok. The result is the win for the Siamese for 3-2.

After the 1932 Revolution. The Royal Golden Trophy has been stopped by the Political reason as Khana Ratsadon is anti-imperialism ideology political group, the tournament replaced by The DPE Students Cup (DPE - Department of Physical Education) after 1934.

After that the association joined the FIFA in 1925 and AFC in 1957.

Thailand national football team joined Olympic Games first time in Australia in 1956.

The first football stadium, Suphachalasai Stadium, was built in 1935. King's Cup, the first football cup was introduced in 1968. And then two years later, Queen's Cup, a national cup competition, started in 1970.

== Thai football competitions ==
=== Leagues and tournaments ===
League competitions in Thailand include :

- Thai League 1
- Thai League 2
- Thai League 3
- Thailand Semi-Pro League
- Thailand Amateur League

(See also: Thai football league system for the additional detail about league system.)

=== Domestic Cup competitions ===
- Thai FA Cup - an annual tournament of football clubs in Thailand.
- Thai League Cup - an annual tournament of football clubs in Thailand.
- Thai League 3 Cup - an annual tournament for third tier football clubs in Thailand.
- Champions Cup - an annual match between the champions of the Thai League 1 and the champions of the Thai FA Cup

=== International Cup competitions ===
- King's Cup - an annual international football competition for national teams.
- Queen's Cup - an annual international football cup competition for football club teams.

=== Other competitions ===
- Chula-Thammasat Traditional Football Match, an annual match between Chulalongkorn University and Thammasat University on January at Suphachalasai Stadium. It first started in 1934.
- Jaturamitr Samakkee a bi-annual competition of four oldest high schools in Thailand (Suankularb Wittayalai School, Debsirin School, Assumption College, and Bangkok Christian College). It first started 1964.

== Youth football ==
Youth football is very popular in Thailand, with several competitions and clubs being active. Bangkok Youth League provides the top level of youth football in Bangkok with a membership that includes teams from Thai Premiership Academies, such as BEC Tero and Chonburi Sharks, as well as local and International Academies such as iPlay Soccer Schools. It provides a structured, competitive environment for over 1000 players aged 6–16 years. Bangkok Soccer League is a youth football club organised for children attending international schools in Thailand and provides regular football for over 500 kids, both Thai and expat. 555

- Thailand Youth League
- Thailand University League
- U-19 Thailand Championship
- Thai U23 League

== Support ==
A 2022 telephone poll conducted for The Nation found that 31.16% of respondents watched the English Premier League (17.33% of whom described themselves as hardcore fans) and 29.60% watched the Thai League 1 (9.59% of whom described themselves as hardcore fans). A 2023 poll conducted by the NIDA Poll Research Centre found that 61.52% of respondents followed the Premier League and 53.80% followed the Thai League 1.

=== Most popular clubs ===
Polling consistently shows that Buriram United is by far the most supported club in the Thai League 1. Polling also consistently shows that Liverpool and Manchester United are by far the most supported Premier League clubs in Thailand.

Compared to other countries outside the United Kingdom, Leicester City has a notable following in Thailand due to the fact that it is owned by Thai businessman Aiyawatt Srivaddhanaprabha. However, it is still not one of the most popular clubs in Thailand.

==== English Premier League ====
NIDA Poll Research Centre (2023)
Club	%
Arsenal	5.27%
Chelsea	7.09%
Liverpool	31.79%
Manchester City	5.72%
Manchester United	34.59%
Other	1.37%
None	14.17%

The Nation (2022)
Club	%
Arsenal	3.85%
Chelsea	9.37%
Leicester City	2.82%
Liverpool	31.32%
Manchester City	2.95%
Manchester United	30.42%

==== Thai League 1 ====
NIDA Poll Research Centre (2023)
Club	%
BG Pathum United	4.46%
Buriram United	36.13%
Chiangrai United	2.97%
Chonburi	3.79%
Khon Kaen United	2.01%
Muangthong United	11.67%
Port	12.49%
Sukhothai	1.41%
Other	3.88%
None	21.19%

The Nation (2022)
Club	%
BG Pathum United	2.97%
Buriram United	32.43%
Chonburi	4.73%
Muangthong United	11.49%
Port	6.49%

== Thai notable players ==
- Bamrung Boonprom
- Chanathip Songkrasin ("Jay")
- Choketawee Promrut ("Choke")
- Datsakorn Thonglao ("Go")
- Kawin Thamsatchanan ("Tong")
- Kiatisuk Senamuang ("Zico")
- Kroekrit Thaweekarn ("Kong")
- Narubadin Weerawatnodom ("Ton")
- Piyapong Pue-on ("Took")
- Ponlawat Pinkong
- Sarach Yooyen ("Tang")
- Sarayuth Chaikamdee ("Joe 5 yards")
- Seksan Piturat ("James")
- Sinthaweechai Hathairattanakool ("Tee")
- Surat Sukha
- Suree Sukha
- Sutee Suksomkit
- Tanaboon Kesarat ("Tum")
- Totchtawan Sripan ("Ban")
- Teerasil Dangda ("Mui")
- Teeratep Winothai ("Leesaw")
- Theerathon Bunmathan ("Aum")
- Therdsak Chaiman ("Uncle Therd")
- Dusit Chalermsan ("Ong")
- Natipong Sritong-In ("Alfred")
- Natee Thongsookkaew
- Witthaya Hloagune ("Oji") previously ("Heng")

== Attendances ==
The average attendance per top-flight football league season and the club with the highest average attendance:

Season	League average	Best club	Best club average
2024-25	4,825	Buriram United	18,363
2023-24	4,698	Buriram United	20,671
2022-23	4,431	Buriram United	21,440

Sources: League pages on Wikipedia

== See also ==
- Football in Bangkok
- Sport in Thailand
- Thai football league system
- Thailand football records and statistics
- List of football clubs in Thailand
- Futsal Thai League
- Thailand national futsal team
- Thai Women's League
- Thailand women's national football team
