= 31st Jaturamitr Samakkee =

(2025) 31st Jaturamitr Samakkee
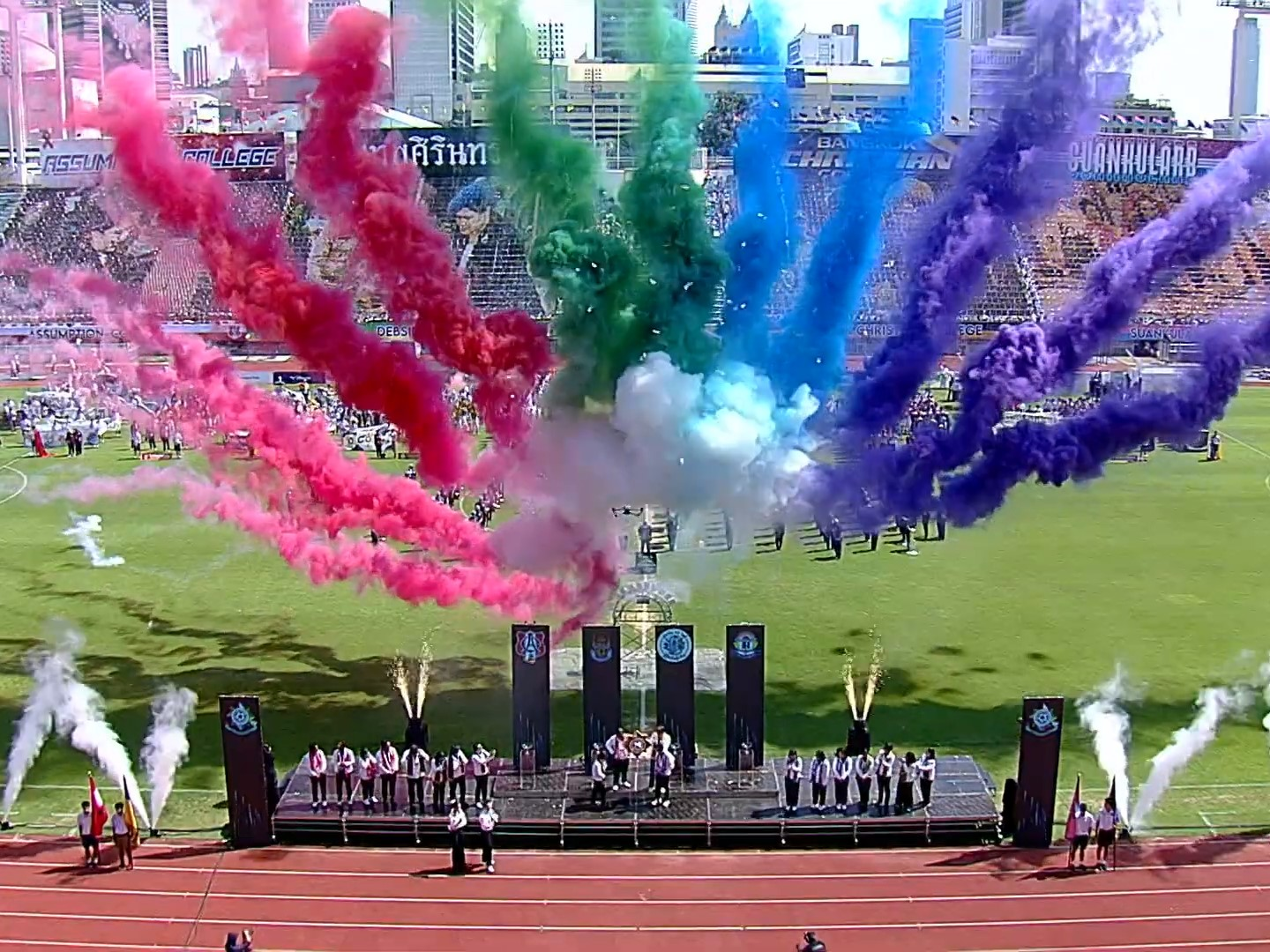
- The opening ceremony of the 31st Jaturamitr Samakkee.

Tournament details
- City: Bangkok
- Dates: 15-22 November 2025
- Teams: 4 Bangkok Christian College; Suankularb Wittayalai School; Debsirin School; Assumption College (Host)
- Venue: Suphachalasai Stadium

Tournament statistics
- Matches played: 8
- Goals scored: 21 (2.63 per match)
- Top scorer(s): Natthakit Phosri; Porawit Bunmaloet; 2 goals
- Best player: Porawit Bunmaloet (Debsirin School)

The 31st Jaturamitr Samakkee was the 31st Jaturamitr Samakkee with Bangkok Christian College,Suankularb Wittayalai School, Debsirin School, and Assumption College (Host) participating. It was held between November 15 and November 22, 2025, at Suphachalasai Stadium.

== Tournament statistics ==
=== First round ===
Position	Team	Played	Won	Drawn	Lost	Goals for	Goals against	Goal difference	Points
1	Debsirin School	3	3	0	0	7	2	+5	9
2	Bangkok Christian College	3	2	0	1	6	4	+2	6
3	Assumption College	3	1	0	2	1	3	-2	3
4	Suankularb Wittayalai School	3	0	0	3	2	7	-5	0

15 November 2025	Bangkok Christian College	3–1	Suankularb Wittayalai School	Suphachalasai Stadium
13:00	Natthakit Phosri 50', 90'; Chomphol Hombunma 67'		Sankhaphong Aksorndam 80'	Referee: Nathee Chusuwan; Assistant referees: Woraphong Prasoetsri; Wattana Chonchakul; Fourth official: Nophadet Muengam

15 November 2025	Assumption College	0–1	Debsirin School	Suphachalasai Stadium
16:00			Theeraphol Anuphan 45+3'	Referee: Winat Phophat; Assistant referees: Rawut Nakharit; Sahasanet Dimongkhol; Fourth official: Anuson Nukaew

17 November 2025	Debsirin School	3–1	Suankularb Wittayalai School	Suphachalasai Stadium
13:00	Ruski Kade 50' (Penalty); Sirawit Wongpraphai 72'; Pawarit Bunmaloet 88'		Theerathep Rathaphol 74'	Referee: Phirasan Krataithong; Assistant referees: Chaowalit Phoonprasit; Srisuwan Bunnam; Fourth official: Chaiyakrit In-bunsong

17 November 2025	Bangkok Christian College	2–0	Assumption College	Suphachalasai Stadium
16:00	Phanuphong Phopsayai 28'; Vision In-aram 47+4'			Referee: Thapakorn Thongkon; Assistant referees: Chotrawi Thongduang; Nissan Chanthep; Fourth official: Usen Yala

19 November 2025	Debsirin School	3–1	Bangkok Christian College	Suphachalasai Stadium
13:00	Krittamet Temram 12'; Trai Kaewkosaba 48'; Nathaphop Chaimongkhol 69'		Korawit Wongthaw 53'	Referee: Nophadet Muengam; Assistant referees: Siwat Chaithong; Sawut Sriamphai; Fourth official: Suriyo Kanhachali

19 November 2025	Suankularb Wittayalai School	0–1	Assumption College	Suphachalasai Stadium
16:00			Kittisak Singha 53'	Referee: Nophadet Muengam; Assistant referees: Siwat Chaithong; Sawut Sriamphai; Fourth official: Suriyo Kanhachali

=== 3rd place champions round ===
22 November 2025	Assumption College	2–0	Suankularb Wittayalai School	Suphachalasai Stadium
13:00	Yongsin Khwanthong 8'; Nathawat Nardthong 84'			Referee: Phalathip Homwan; Assistant referees: Kriangkrai Pimsanit; Khattiya Chapu; Fourth official: Nathee Chusuwan

=== Champions round ===
22 November 2025	Debsirin School	2–0	Bangkok Christian College	Suphachalasai Stadium
16:00	Porawit Bunmaloet 26'; Siranat Sriwalak 90'			Referee: Nophadet Muengam; Assistant referees: Wichet Ketkaew; Yotsaphon Thongphrom; Fourth official: Wathan Morin

== Best athlete awards ==
School	Player
Bangkok Christian College	Pichaya Khongsri
Debsirin School	Sirawit Wongphrapai
Suankularb Wittayalai School	Chiramet Worakulcharadilok
Assumption College	Yongsin Khwanthong

== Best player moral award ==
- Porawit Bunmaloet (Debsirin School)

== Fair play award ==
- Debsirin School

== Other sources ==
- 31st Jaturamitr Samakkee's channel on YouTube
- 31st Jaturamitr Samakkee on Facebook
- 31st Jaturamitr Samakkee on Instagram

== See also ==
- Jaturamitr Samakkee
