= Aryan Bose =

Indian footballer (born 2009)

Personal information
- Date of birth: 1 January 2009 (age 17)
- Place of birth: Bangkok, Thailand
- Height: 1.88 m (6 ft 2 in)
- Position: Right winger

Team information
- Current team: Chainat Hornbill
- Number: 89

Youth career
- 2012–2018: Bangkok Galaxy
- 2018–2026: STB Academy
- 2024–2026: BCC

Senior career*
| Years | Team | Apps | (Gls) |
| 2026– | Chainat Hornbill | 6 | (0) |
- * Club domestic league appearances and goals as of 12 November 2026

Aryan Bose (born 1 January 2009) is a professional footballer who plays for Chainat Hornbill as a right-winger.

== Early life ==
Bose was born in Bangkok, Thailand, to Indian parents. As a child, he also played tennis and basketball, representing his schools at both.

== Career ==
=== Early career and experience with Bayern Munich ===
At the age of three, Bose joined Bangkok Galaxy in Thailand, and continued to play for the youth club after enrolling at the St Andrews International School, where he also played football. While studying at St Andrews, he was selected for the Federation of British International Schools in Asia football team. At the age of nine, he moved to the Ascot International School, having been offered a football scholarship there. At the same time, he joined the STB Academy in Bangkok.

While still playing at the STB Academy, he enrolled at the Bangkok Christian College (BCC) in 2024, citing being able to feature at the Jaturamitr Samakkee football competition as his reason for transferring. It was during his time at the STB Academy and BCC that he joined German Bundesliga club Bayern Munich's Global Academy programme, and in 2025 he travelled to Bavaria to train with Bayern Munich's coaches. The following year, he was selected for the prestigious World Squad - another programme run by Bayern Munich - as a result of his impressive performances with the Global Academy.

=== Chainat Hornbill ===
Following his experience with Bayern Munich, he returned to Thailand, joining Thai League 2 club Chainat Hornbill. Having made his debut in the 0–0 draw with Pattaya United on 16 September 2026, he went on to register two assists in the next four games he played in.

== Career statistics ==
=== Club ===
As of 12 November 2026

Appearances and goals by club, season and competition
| Club | Season | League | | | National Cup (Note: Includes Thai FA Cup) | | League Cup (Note: Includes Thai League Cup) | | Other | | Total | |
| Club | Season | Division | Apps | Goals | Apps | Goals | Apps | Goals | Apps | Goals | Apps | Goals |
|---|---|---|---|---|---|---|---|---|---|---|---|---|
| Chainat Hornbill | 2026–27 | Thai League 2 | 6 | 0 | 1 | 0 | 0 | 0 | 0 | 0 | 7 | 0 |
| Career total | | | 6 | 0 | 1 | 0 | 0 | 0 | 0 | 0 | 7 | 0 |
