= Jaturamitr Samakkee =

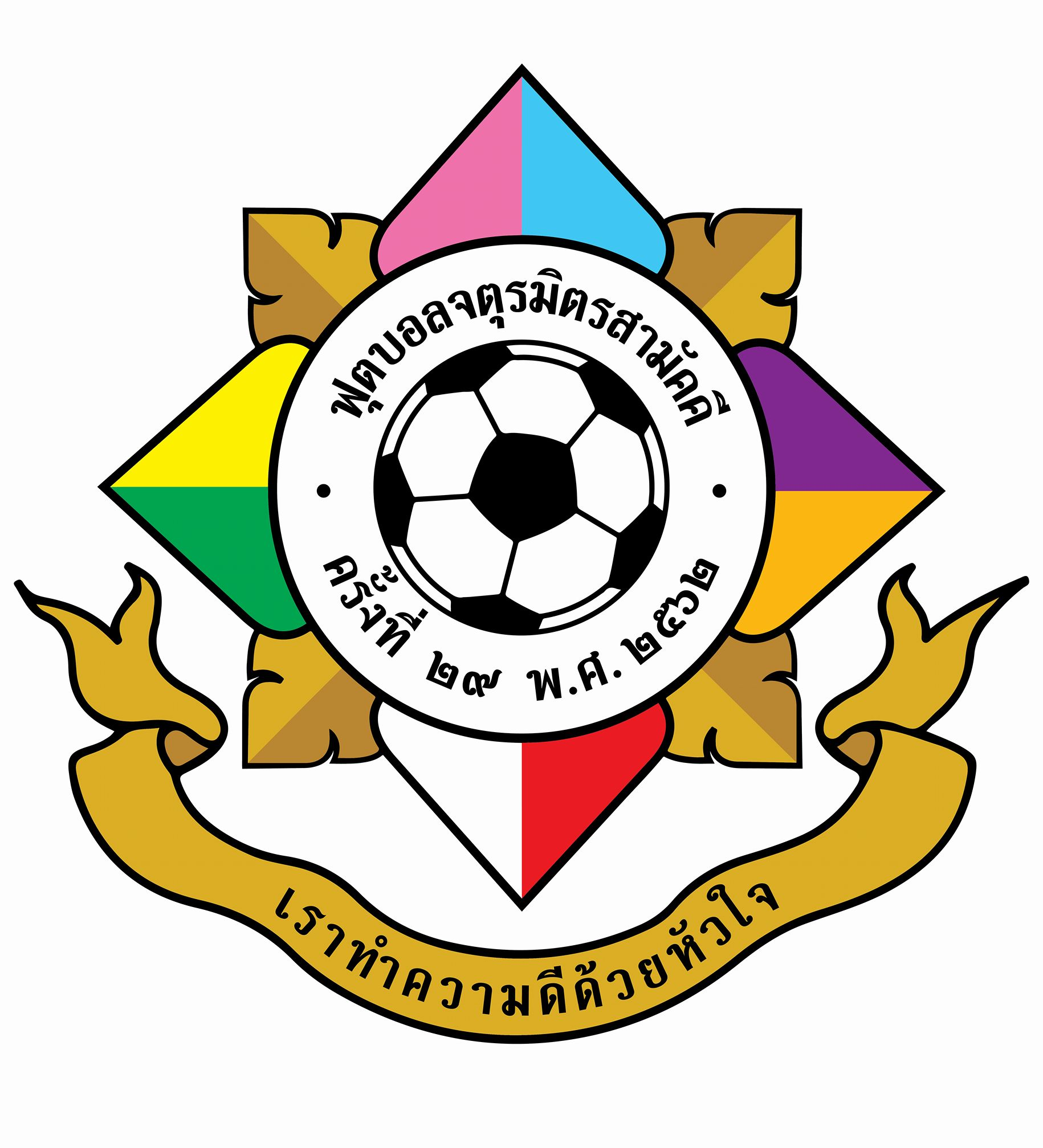
- (Logo of Jaturamitr Samakkee 29th)
- Founded: 16 October 1964
- Country: Thailand
- Number of clubs: 4
- Domestic cup(s): Royal Cup; Sirindhorn
- Current champions: Debsirin School (7 titles)
- Most championships: Suankularb Wittayalai School (15 titles)
- Broadcasters: SiamSport (True Visions CH74); JaturamitrLIVE; MCOT HD (16th); NBT (25th,26th,27th); Channel 3 Family (28th); YouTube Live (28th); True4U (29th); Channel 5 (30th); Channel 7 HD (31st)
- Website: jaturamitr.com
- Current: 31st Jaturamitr Samakkee

The Jaturamitr Samakkee (Thai: จตุรมิตรสามัคคี, RTGS: Chaturamit Samakkhi, pronounced [tɕàtùʔrámít sǎːmákkʰīː]) is a traditional secondary school association football (soccer) competition played by the four oldest boys' schools in Thailand: Suankularb Wittayalai School, Debsirin School, Assumption College, and Bangkok Christian College. It is held biennially, usually in November, at Suphachalasai Stadium in Bangkok, with the schools rotating as hosts.

== Background ==
=== Prior to the establishment ===
Thailand was full of student fights between different schools, colleges and universities, and gang violence between youngsters in the late 1950s and early 1960s countrywide, which is a big problem for schools, teachers, parents, students who don't involve in a fight, society and government at that time.

In addition of gang violence, there were also having money extortions from ordinary people.

Many people, especially in provinces surround Bangkok, fear to get injured unintentionally, which is from the collateral damages from student fights and gang violences. (At the late 1950s)

The ministry of education, led by then-Education Minister (Mom Luang Pin Malakul), make a meeting to solve the problem. Then, they choose these 4 schools to be the "example schools" to shows to the public that students, even from the different schools can be friends and not enemies to each other. The "Chosen schools" include Assumption College, Bangkok Christian College, Debsirin School and Suankularb Wittayalai School to show to the public that there are the other schools who don't fights to each other.

However, being chosen alone aren't enough for these schools. This led to the executives of all 4, led by Prong Songsaengterm (The headmaster of Suankularb Wittayalai school), Aree Semprasart (Headmaster of Bangkok Christian College), Bun-oub Buranaputr (Headmaster of Debsirin School) and Banna Chanodom of Assumption College to have a conference to decide how "We bond together", and that led to this conclusion: "Let's organized the football match together".

Overtime, these schools and the competition itself established bonds and connections between each other.

=== Establishment of the competition ===
The first championship series was held from 16 October to 18 November 1964, with student unity as a central theme for the games. Subsequent competitions were held annually until 1985, except in 1966–1967, 1972, 1974–1977 and 1979–1980. From 1987, the competition continued on a biennial basis. It is a popular Thai football event, and outstanding players from the competition continue their careers by playing in the Thailand Premier League, including such figures as Thawatchai Damrong-Ongtrakul and Teerathep Winothai. The event is regularly broadcast on national television, and the three latest competitions have also been broadcast via live streaming video with live scores published on an official website. In addition to the matches themselves, great efforts are made to create elaborate displays and card stunts (Thai: แปรอักษร) by volunteer students from each of the schools.

Although unity has always been the central theme of the competition (jaturamitr is derived from the Sanskrit catura + mitra, meaning 'four friends' and samakkee (from Pali sāmaggī) translates as 'harmony' or 'unity'). The word Jaturamitr is often used as a catch phrase to refer to students or alumni of the four participating schools. Strong rivalries have developed between the schools. Especially intense are the rivalries between Suankularb and Debsirin and Assumption versus Bangkok Christian. This has led to several cases of inter-school violence during the weeks of the competition. The extent of the issue is such that strict audience segregation and security enforcement is required during the matches.

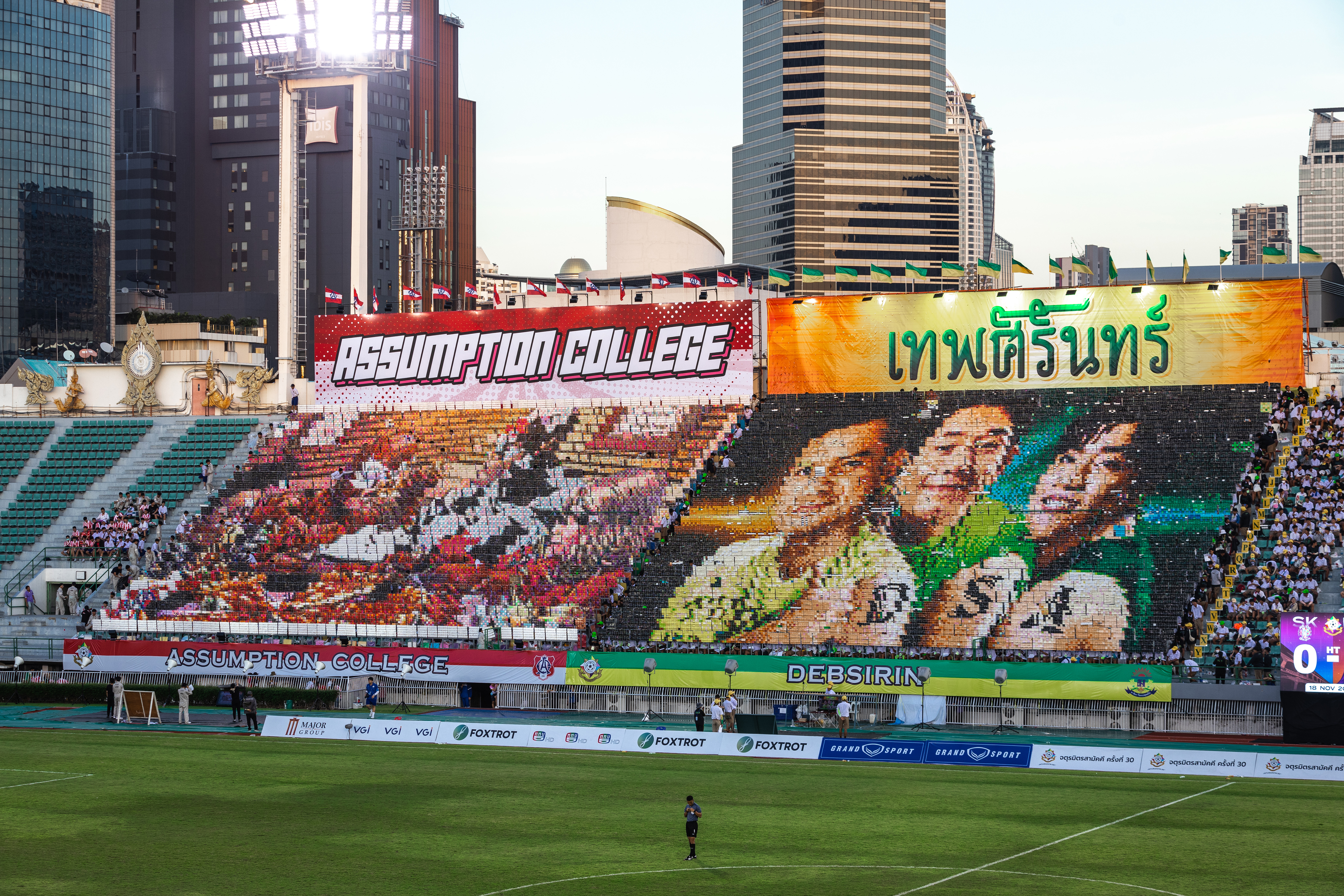
Card stunt performed by Assumption College and Debsirin School in the Jaturamitr Samakkee 30th

The latest, 31st competition, was held on 15 to 22 November 2025, hosted by Assumption College. The Champion of the Tournament is Debsirin School.

== Tournaments ==
Jaturamitr Samakkee football match was founded in 1964 as the first year. The order of competition and host are as follows:

Tournament	Days held	Host	1st place winner
1	16 October to 18 November 1964	Suankularb Wittayalai School	Suankularb Wittayalai School
2	19 October to 13 November 1965	Debsirin School	Debsirin School
The competition was suspended In 1966 and 1967 due to the Asian Games. And Laem Thong sport hosted by Thailand, resulting in the Supachalasai Stadium not being available to host the competition.
3	16 October to 1 November 1968	Assumption College	Suankularb Wittayalai School together with Bangkok Christian College
4	21 October to 7 November 1969	Bangkok Christian College	Suankularb Wittayalai School together with Bangkok Christian College
5	21 November to 30 November 1970	Suankularb Wittayalai School	Bangkok Christian College
6	22 October to 30 October 1971	Debsirin School	Suankularb Wittayalai School together with Debsirin School
7	20 October to 2 November 1973	Assumption College	No finals
8	18 October to 2 November 1974	Assumption College	Debsirin School
But due to economic conditions And political conditions do not allow to organize the Jaturamitr Samakkee football match. Therefore stopped for a period from year 1975 to 1977 and the competition was restored in the year 1978 to prevent this football tradition from disappearing.
This competition is not counted in the competition order.	24 October to 1 November 1978	Bangkok Christian College But on the finals, all 4 schools have co-hosted By using Chulalongkorn University Stadium as the competition ground	Suankularb Wittayalai School
9	28 November to 6 December 1981	Suankularb Wittayalai School	Suankularb Wittayalai School
10	27 November to 4 December 1982	Debsirin School	Suankularb Wittayalai School
11	20 November to 25 November 1983	Assumption College	Suankularb Wittayalai School
12	23 November to 1 December 1984	Bangkok Christian College	Suankularb Wittayalai School
13	1 November to 9 November 1985	Suankularb Wittayalai School	Suankularb Wittayalai School together with Assumption College
Later, the committee organized the Jaturamitr Samakkee tradition football match. Have agreed that if there is a competition every year, it may be wasteful But if omitted every year, afraid that the football match will be absent It was agreed that the Jaturamitr Samakkee Football Tournament will be held every year. In the year without competition, organize the Jaturamitr football home-away competition, which is a competition using only the field in the school.
14	19 December to 26 December 1987	Debsirin School	Suankularb Wittayalai School
15	15 December to 28 December 1989	Assumption College	Assumption College
16	24 December to 28 December 1991	Bangkok Christian College	Bangkok Christian College
17	18 December to 28 December 1993	Suankularb Wittayalai School	Assumption College
18	25 November to 2 December 1995	Debsirin School	Suankularb Wittayalai School together with Assumption College
19	13 December to 20 December 1997	Assumption College	Debsirin School together with Bangkok Christian College
20	11 December to 19 December 1999	Bangkok Christian College	Debsirin School together with Bangkok Christian College
21	17 November to 24 November 2001	Suankularb Wittayalai School	Suankularb Wittayalai School together with Bangkok Christian College
22	12 January to 18 January 2004	Debsirin School	Bangkok Christian College
23	26 November to 3 December 2005	Assumption College	Assumption College together with Bangkok Christian College
24	17 November to 24 November 2007	Bangkok Christian College	Assumption College
25	21 November to 28 November 2009	Suankularb Wittayalai School	Bangkok Christian College
The 26th competition was originally scheduled for 19, 21, 23, and 26 November 2011, but there was a flood. Therefore resolved to postpone the competition to 2012
26	10 November to 17 November 2012	Debsirin School	Suankularb Wittayalai School together with Bangkok Christian College
27	15 November to 22 November 2014	Assumption College	Assumption College together with Bangkok Christian College
The 28th competition was originally scheduled for 12, 14, 16, and 19 November 2016. But because it is in the midst of condolence for His Majesty King Bhumibol Adulyadej Therefore resolved to postpone the match indefinitely Initially, the competition is scheduled for 18, 20, 22 and 25 November 2017. But later has to advance the competition day to a week earlier
28	11 November to 18 November 2017	Bangkok Christian College	Assumption College
The 29th competition was originally scheduled for 16, 18, 20, and 23 November 2019. But because Supachalasai Stadium has other activities besides football competitions and uses the stadium at the same time as the original period of the competition, Pope Francis Traveled to Thailand There is a Mass worshiping ceremony. For citizens on November 21, 2019, at Supachalasai Stadium The competition committee therefore resolved to advance the competition by 1 week to 9, 11, 13 and 16 November 2019.
29	9 November to 16 November 2019	Suankularb Wittayalai School	Debsirin School
The 30th competition was originally scheduled for November 2021, but due to the COVID-19 pandemic, it was moved to 2023.
30	11 to 18 November 2023	Debsirin School	Suankularb Wittayalai School together with Bangkok Christian College
31	15 to 22 November 2025	Assumption College	Debsirin School

== See also ==
- Chula–Thammasat Traditional Football Match
- Card stunt
- Football in Thailand
- Youth Sport
