= Great Rose Bowl Hoax =

1961 college football prank

The card stunt at the 1961 Rose Bowl as altered by California Institute of Technology students

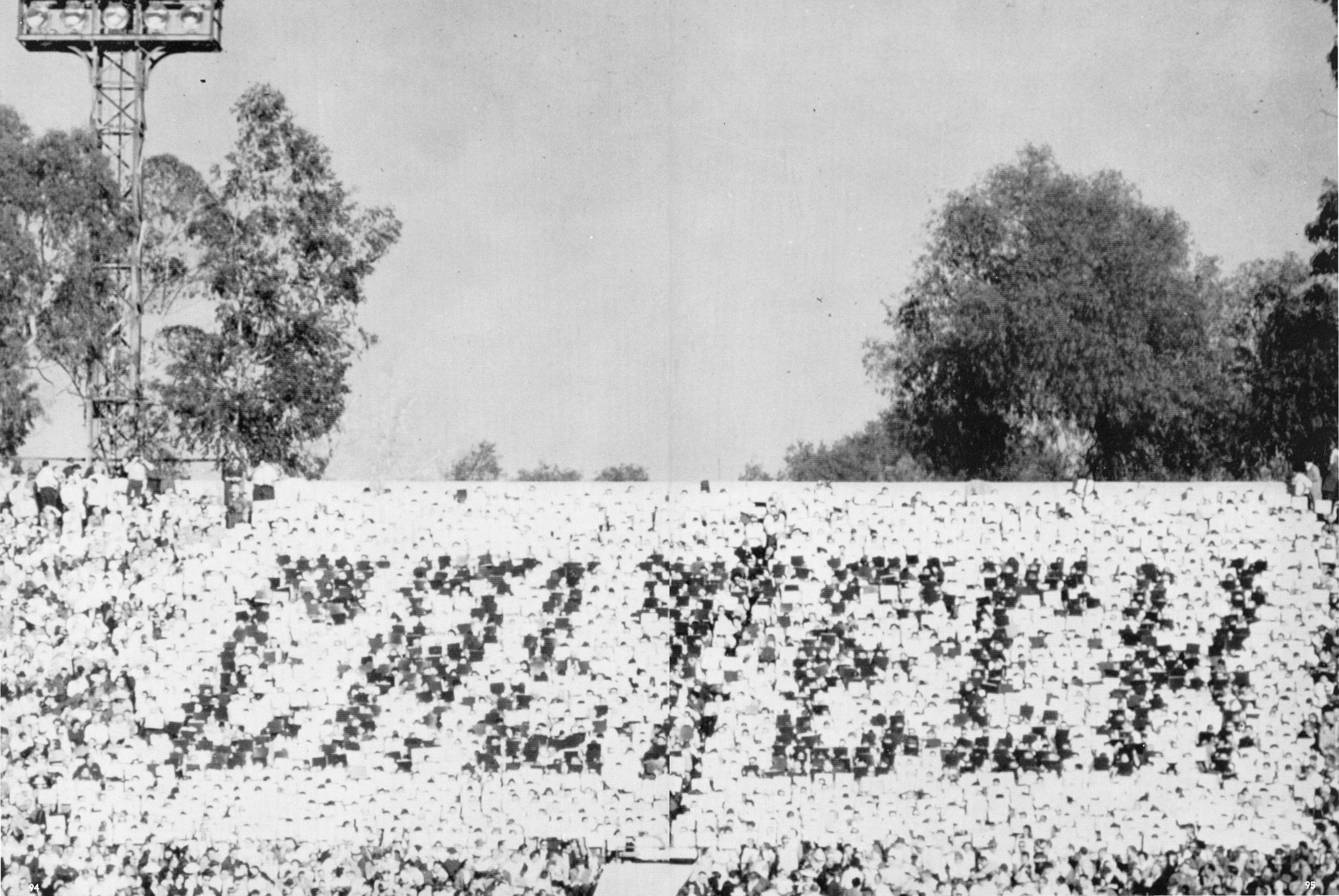
The card stunt in black and white

The Great Rose Bowl Hoax was a prank at the 1961 Rose Bowl, an annual American college football bowl game. That year, the Washington Huskies were pitted against the Minnesota Golden Gophers. At halftime, the Huskies led 17–0, and their cheerleaders took the field to lead the spectators in the stands in a card stunt, a routine involving flip-cards depicting various images for the audience to raise. However, a number of students from the California Institute of Technology managed to alter the card stunt shown during the halftime break, by making the Washington fans inadvertently spell out CALTECH.

The prank has been described as the "greatest collegiate prank of all time" and received national attention, as the game was broadcast to an estimated 30 million viewers across the United States by NBC. One author wrote, "Few college pranks can be said to be more grandly conceived, carefully planned, flawlessly executed, and publicly dramatic" than the Great Rose Bowl Hoax.

== Planning ==
The hoax was planned by a group of Caltech students in December 1960, subsequently known as the "Fiendish Fourteen". Their leader was 19-year-old engineering student Lyn Hardy. They felt that their college was ignored up to and during the Rose Bowl Game, though the school's teams often played in the Rose Bowl Stadium a few miles from campus. The students decided to use Washington's flip-card show to garner some attention.

To discover the details behind the Huskies' show, Hardy disguised himself as a reporter for a local Los Angeles high school (Dorsey High School), and interviewed Washington's head cheerleader. He learned that they would be able to trick unsuspecting Washington fans into holding up the incorrect signs by changing the 2,232 instruction sheets.

The students broke into the Cal State Long Beach dorm rooms where the Washington cheerleaders were staying and removed a single instruction sheet from a bedroom. They printed copies and altered each page by hand. On New Year's Eve, three of the "Fiendish Fourteen" reentered the cheerleaders' dorm building and replaced the stack of old sheets with the new.

Some of the helpers were: Michael Lampton, later an astronaut; Reg Clemens, who became a consultant for research-and-development company Sandia Labs; Lon Bell, later chief executive of Amerigon Inc.; Harry Keller, later CEO of Smart Science Education Inc.; and Allen Berman, later a project manager at the Jet Propulsion Laboratory.

== Execution ==
At halftime on January 2, 1961, the Washington card stunt was executed as the Caltech students had hoped. NBC cameras panned to the section raising the flip-cards as they uneventfully displayed the first eleven designs.

The twelfth design modified the design of a husky into that of a beaver (Caltech's mascot) but was subtle enough that the audience did not notice.

The thirteenth design called for the word Washington in script to gradually appear from left to right (starting with the capital "W"), but it ran backwards (with the small letter "n" appearing first). Other sources say that the routine intended to spell out HUSKIES, but that it had been altered to spell out SEIKSUH. Regardless, it was dismissed as a simple mistake.

The fourteenth design, however, was an unmistakable prank. CALTECH was displayed in big block letters on a white background.

== Reaction and aftermath ==
Mel Allen and Chick Hearn covered the game for an NBC national telecast. The announcers and the stadium fell silent for several moments before breaking into laughter. As the Washington band marched off the field, the cheerleaders did not give the signal for the fifteenth and final image. The Huskies were unaware that the Caltech students had not altered the last design, which was an American flag.

The game resulted in a 17–7 victory by the Washington Huskies, their second straight win at the Rose Bowl. The practical joke was detailed in the next morning's Seattle Times alongside coverage of the game.

The card stunt was photographed by Rose Bowl attendee Bruce Whitehead, who provided a black and white photograph to Caltech for publication. In 2014, Whitehead's original color Kodachrome slide was discovered and donated to the Caltech Archives.

== Similar hoaxes ==
A similar hoax by Caltech at the 1984 Rose Bowl was inspired by this one. A group of students altered the scoreboard to show Caltech leading its rival MIT 38 to 9. It was the UCLA Bruins leading the Illinois Fighting Illini by that score in the third quarter. The students also altered the scoreboard to rename the game, "The Beaver Bowl" in reference to the Caltech and MIT mascots.

Another hoax reminiscent of the Great Rose Bowl Hoax is Yale University's November 2004 prank against Harvard.

For the 2014 Rose Bowl, Caltech students built a large white "PASADENA" sign overlooking the stadium. Just before halftime, they turned on lights on the sign which spelled out "CALTECH".
