= St Andrews International School Bangkok =

- โรงเรียนนานาชาติเซนต์แอนดรูว์สกรุงเทพฯ
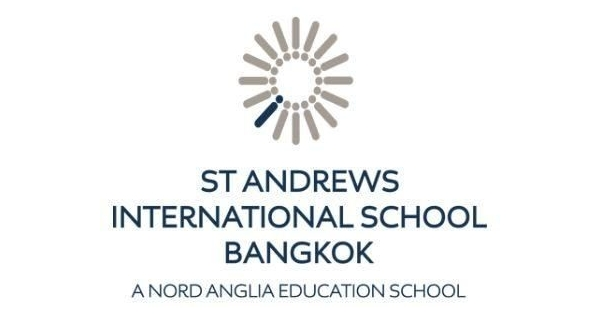
- Vadhana District, Bangkok; Thailand

Information
- Type: Private school, International School
- Established: 1997
- Owner: Nord Anglia Education
- Head of School: Paul Schofield
- Age: 2 to 18
- Accreditation: The Office for National Education Standards and Quality Assessment (ONESQA); Education Development Trust (EDT).
- Website: St Andrews International School Bangkok

St Andrews International School Bangkok (Thai: โรงเรียนนานาชาติเซนต์แอนดรูว์สกรุงเทพฯ, RTGS: Rong Rian Nana Chat Sen Aendru Krung Thep) is a British International School founded in 1997 that provides a British-style education and curriculum to children ranging from Foundation Stage 1 (2 years old) to High School (18 years old). St Andrews is a Nord Anglia Education operated school and part of a network of 78 schools that spans across 31 countries. St Andrews has over 10 students representing an international community of 50+ nationalities. St Andrews is an inclusive school that welcomes students of all abilities to be ambitious and learn in a diverse and safe environment.

The school is located across two campuses in close proximity on Sukhumvit Road in Vadhana District and Khlong Toei District. St Andrews Primary School is located on Sukhumvit 71 Soi Pridi Banomyong 20/1, accessible from On Nut and Phra Khanong BTS stations. St Andrews High School is located on 1020 Sukhumvit Rd, close to Ekkamai Gateway shopping mall, Ekkamai and Phra Khanong BTS stations.

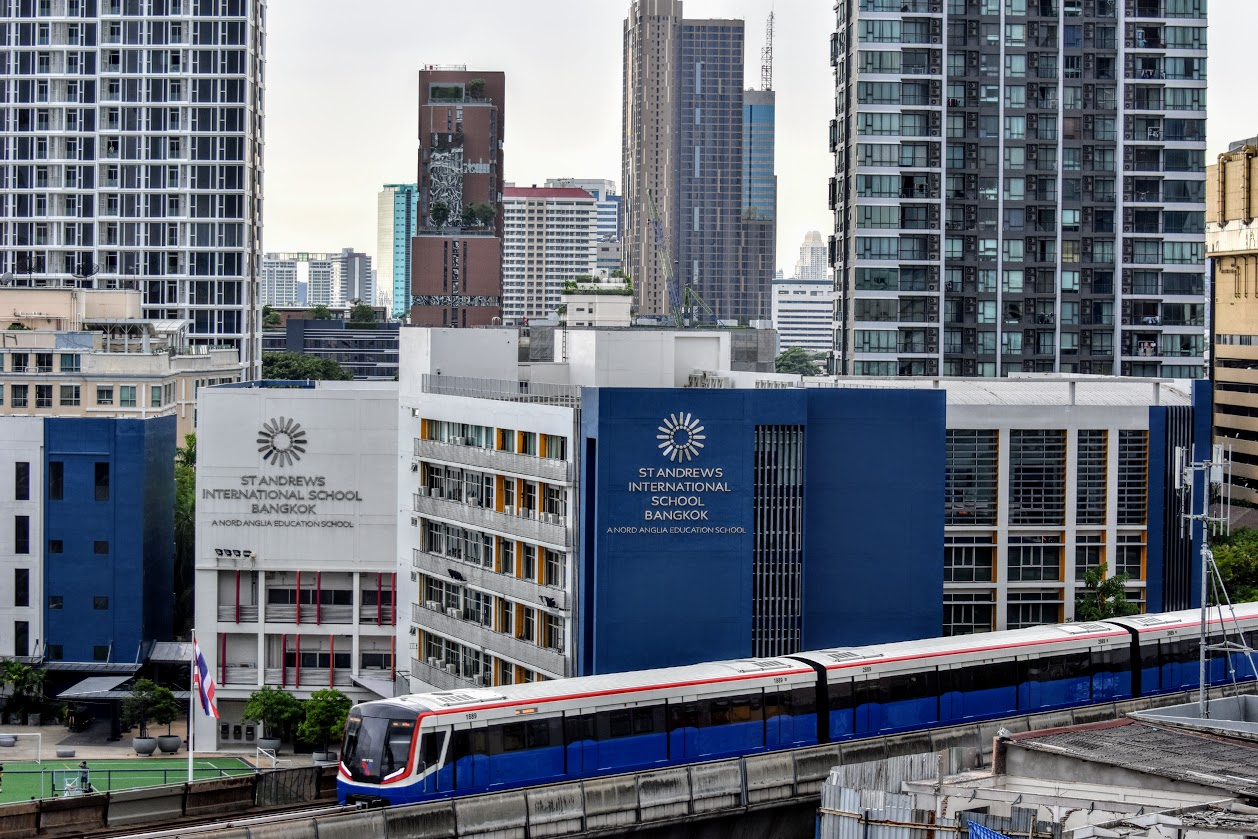
St Andrews Bangkok High School on the Sukhumvit BTS Line

== History ==
Established in 1997, St Andrews International School, Primary and High School were previously located on the same campus on Sukhumvit Soi 71. In August 2017, St Andrews International School expanded and redeveloped a nearby private Thai school into a new purpose-built High School campus on Sukhumvit Road.

In 2020, St Andrews International School, Primary School was awarded the ISC 2020 International School of the Year and for the Best Environmental initiative of 2020 with the ‘Eco Beasts’.

== Student profile ==
- 2000+ Students: (900+ Primary, 1100+ Secondary)
- Nationalities: 50:50 International and Thai Students. 50+ Nationalities
- Student to Teacher Ratio: Foundation Stage 6:1 KS1 / KS2 - 10:1, High School - 14:1
- Average class size: Nursery/Kindergarten 15 students, KS1/KS2 - 20 students, High School 16 Students

== Curriculum ==
=== English National Curriculum ===
St Andrews Primary and High School follow the National Curriculum in England with modifications to incorporate aspects of the international community.

St Andrews organises its students into Key Stages; Foundation, KS1, KS2, KS3, KS4, and KS5. In KS5, St Andrews offers recognised qualifications including the International General Certificate of Secondary Education (IGCSE) and International Baccalaureate (IB) Diploma Programme (DP) and Career-related Programme (CP). The IBDP and IBCP programmes provide students with well-respected and widely recognised qualifications for entry into higher education and universities worldwide.

=== Languages ===
The language of instruction at St Andrews International School Bangkok is English. Languages taught include Thai, French, Spanish, German, Korean, Mandarin, Japanese.

The First Language Programme is for French, German, Japanese and Korean students. It is an additional programme that supports students who are native speakers or have equivalent language proficiency with the necessary language skills and cultural understanding to integrate back into their national educational systems upon returning home.

=== Learning support ===
St Andrews has an inclusive educational policy with non-selective admissions, welcoming students of all abilities. Learning support to students is delivered in-class in small groups as well as individually outside the classroom. Individual Education Plans (IEP) are designed for learning support students and used by teachers to adapt the classroom learning environment to meet all individuals learning needs and goals.

== Accreditation and affiliations ==
St Andrews has full international accreditation by the Education Development Trust (EDT). The Education Development Trust is a UK based institution that provides accreditation, INSET and educational programmes to schools in the UK and abroad.

BSO Inspection Reports indicated that St Andrews quality of education standards were outstanding across the Primary School and High School. This standard was validated by the International School Quality Mark (ISQM).

St Andrews International School is a recognised International Baccalaureate IB World School and provides the programme to Year 12 and 13. St Andrews is an accredited examination centre. For Edexcel IGCSE, University of Cambridge IGCSE and the College Board SAT.

St Andrews has affiliations with the below organisations:

- Centre for British Teaching Education Trust(CfBT)
- British Schools Overseas (BSO)
- International Baccalaureate Organisation (IBO)
- Office for National Education Standards and Quality Assessment (ONESQA)
- International Schools Association of Thailand (ISAT)
- Council of International Schools (COIS)
- The Federation of British International Schools in Asia (FOBISIA)

== Notable alumni ==
- Aryan Bose (Footballer)
- Nidhish Sachdeva (Athlete, Musician)
- Gabriel Watkins (Singer-Songwriter)
