= Card stunt =

Audience showing cards to create an image

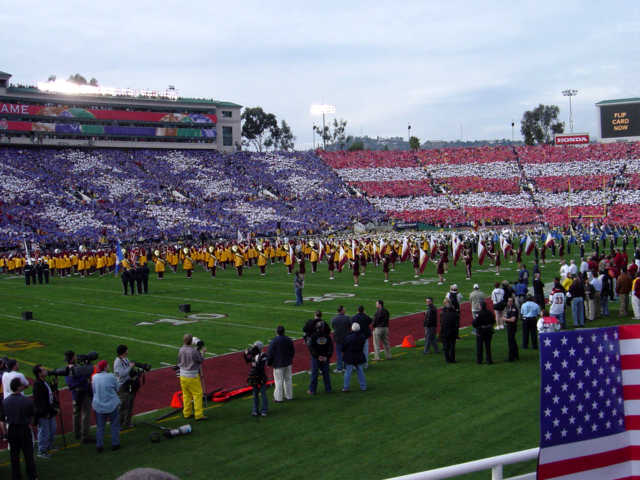
Card stunt performed at the 2004 Rose Bowl; instructions to performers are visible on screen at upper right

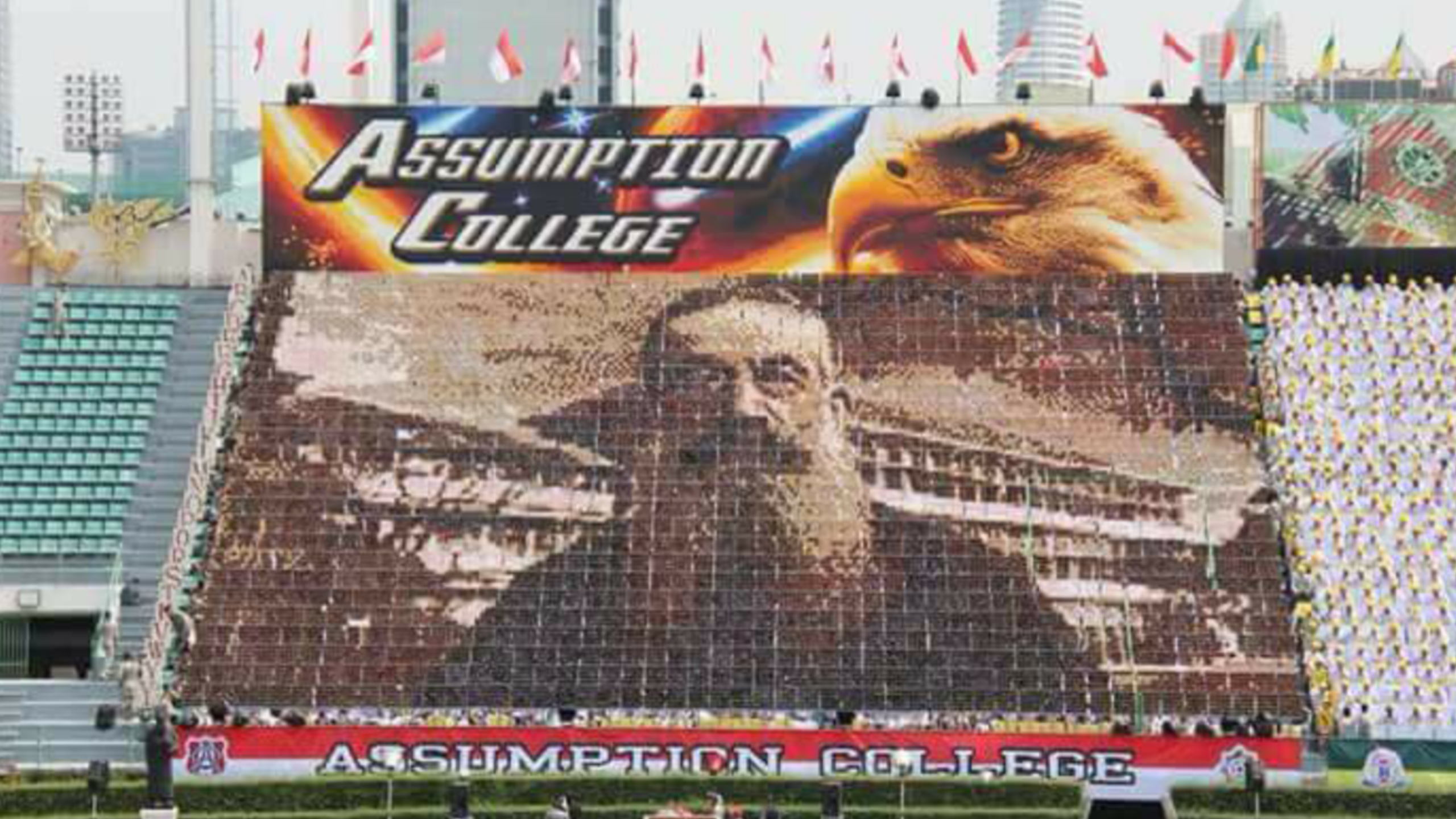
Card stunt during a Jaturamitr Samakkee match in 2017, performed by Assumption College, Bangkok

Card stunts are a planned, coordinated sequence of actions performed by an audience, whose members raise cards that, in the aggregate, create a recognizable image. The images they create can range widely and, through careful planning, the same cards can create a number of different images by systematically changing how the cards are held up. Although card stunts are now performed at a variety of events ranging from sports to political rallies, the card stunt is closely associated with American football, particularly college football, as well as association football, where it can form part of a tifo. The North Korean mass games Arirang Festival, however, were the first to extend the card stunt to an art form, using flip-book cards to produce enormous hour-long animated sequences.

Card Stunts created on a smaller scale (50 to 1,000 cards) are used as team-building exercises for corporations, or to promote a new company logo, or recognize a company milestone. These card stunts, known as "billboard card stunts," are created using cards that are held above the card holders' heads. The largest billboard card stunt was created on September 17, 2013, in the desert outside Las Vegas by Kivett Productions. The card stunts were to promote the opening of Britney Spears' new show at the Planet Hollywood Las Vegas Resort & Casino.

== By country ==
=== Mexico ===
In Mexico's Heroic Military Academy, card stunts are done during various occasions, especially on September 13, the anniversary of the Battle of Chapultepec, where a program is made in honor of this great battle.

=== North Korea ===
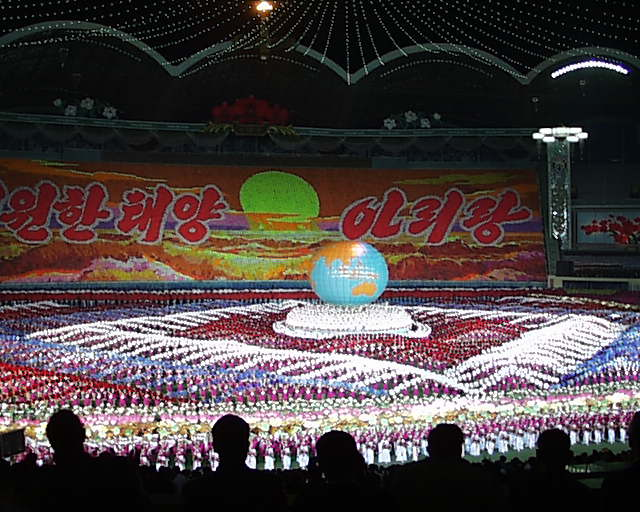
Arirang Festival in North Korea

North Korea's yearly Arirang Festival, also known as the Mass Games, in Pyongyang capitalizes on choreography and card stunt to create sweeping images across the stadium. The festival is famed for the use of this technique as part of the iconographic propaganda art of the regime.

=== South Korea ===
During the presidency of Park Chung Hee, card stunts were used during marches and stadium gatherings. The incorporation of these was one of several elements of Park's cult of personality which paralleled that of the Kim family in North Korea.

=== Thailand ===
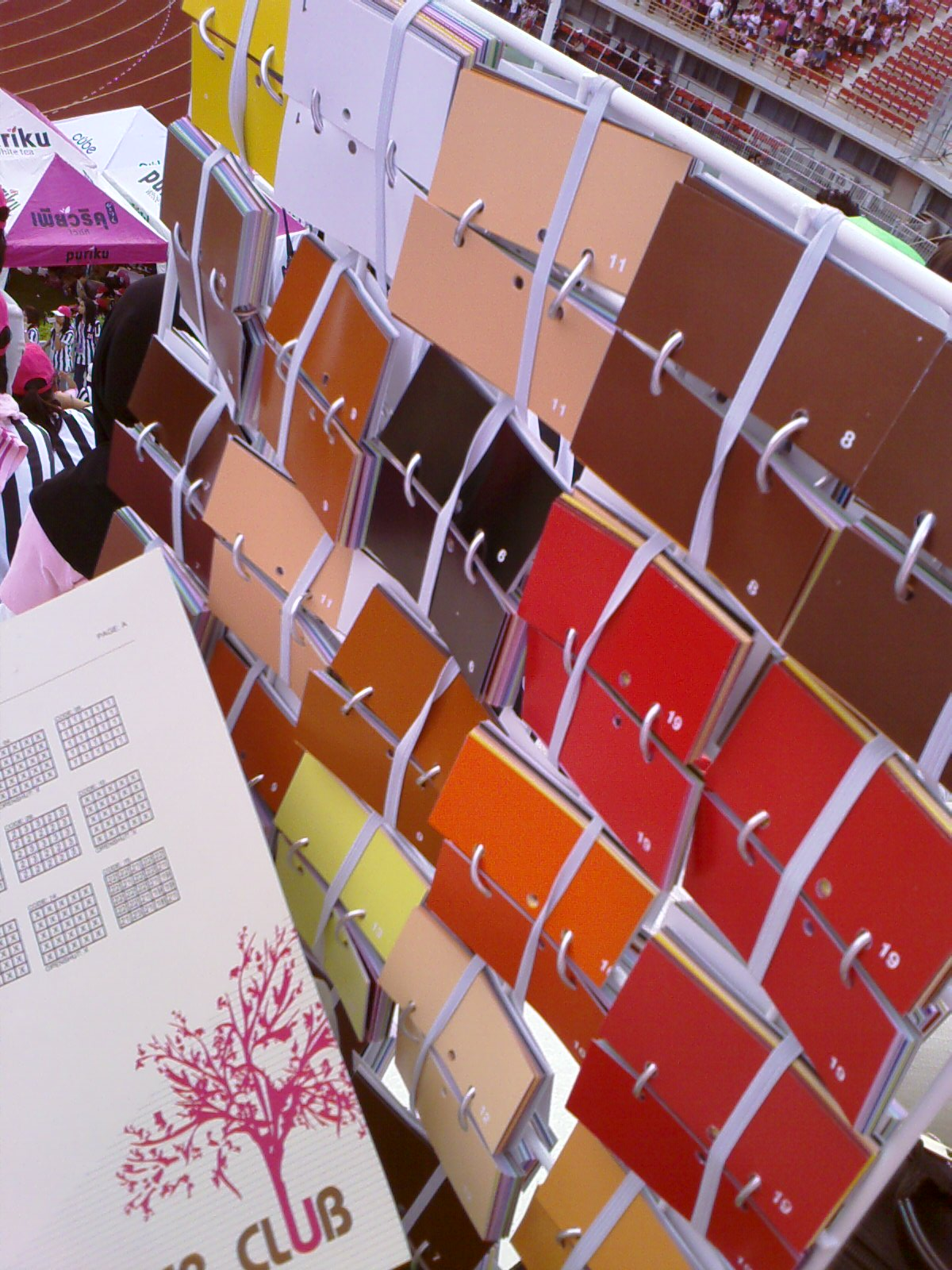
Colored card booklets on a card stunt "plate"—the performers arrange the cards according to predesigned patterns in order to achieve a detailed aggregate image.

Card stunts (Thai: การแปรอักษร) are regularly performed in certain sporting events in Thailand. They are especially associated with Jaturamitr Samakkee and Chula–Thammasat Traditional Football Match, but are also employed in most school- and university-level sporting events where performances by the seated crowd often play an important part in the competition. In addition to plain colored cards, other objects such as umbrellas, flashlights and reflective surfaces are also used, and special plates with multiple tiles of colored card booklets are used to create detailed aggregate images.

The origin of such performances in Thailand can be traced back to Assumption College, a member of the Jaturamitr, where in 1942, by the instruction of Cherd Sudara, a teacher at the school, differently-uniformed students in the audience arranged to form the school's initials. This developed into dynamic messages by physical movement of the crowd and later the covering and exposure of specific-colored clothing. The Chula–Thammasat Traditional Football Match adopted the card stunt in 1957; in the following years, cardboard cards became the predominant medium for the stunts. As a part of larger events, performances by Chulalongkorn University students were featured in the opening ceremony of the 1974 Asian Games in Tehran, and eight thousand students from the Jaturamitr schools performed during the 1999 FESPIC Games in Bangkok.

=== United States ===
The Great Rose Bowl Hoax was a card stunt pulled off by students of California Institute of Technology (CalTech) during the 1961 Rose Bowl.

A 2006 Super Bowl commercial by Budweiser, titled "The Wave", features a fictional card stunt using computer animation. The crowd at the Rose Bowl performs a card stunt which shows a beer bottle being opened and poured around the stadium into a glass and subsequently being consumed one gulp at a time. The crowd finished with a collective "AHHHH".

In February, 2006 the Gillette company sponsored the "World's Largest Card Stunt" at the NASCAR Daytona 500 with over 118,000 fans set to participate. The Card Stunts were produced by Kivett Productions. During the singing of the "Star-Spangled Banner", the US national anthem, fans held up cards forming a patriotic design consisting of stars and stripes. Following the anthem, fans flipped the cards to display the "Gillette Fusion" logo.

On August 25, 2007, the Bristol Motor Speedway and Kivett Productions broke the Daytona 500 record, by creating what is now the World's Largest Card Stunt with 128,000 cards. There were two card stunts that were sponsored by Sprint; and the Card Stunts took place during the Food City 500 Race. An army of 325 workers spend 5 hours placing the cards in the seats.

The music video for Weird Al Yankovic's "Sports Song", a parody of college fight songs, includes a card stunt.

During the Super Bowl 50 halftime show, held at Levi's Stadium in Santa Clara, California, audience members participated in two card stunts: one at the beginning, and another at the end. At the beginning of the show, fans displayed a sunburst pattern. At the end of the show, cards revealed the phrase "Believe in Love" on a rainbow-colored background.

== Other performances ==
=== College traditions ===
The first card stunt was performed by students at the University of California, Berkeley ("Cal") during the 1910 Big Game against rival Stanford University, and consisted of two stunts in total: a picture of the Stanford Axe and a large blue "C" on a white background. While the card stunt is closely associated with college football, this first instance took place at a rugby match because all the major colleges and universities on the West Coast of the United States had briefly dropped football in favor of rugby during the early 1910s. As universities switched back, students brought the card stunts with them and by that time they became a national phenomenon associated with college football. While the tradition has subsided at many American colleges and universities, Cal maintains the tradition through the UC Rally Committee.

"Block I", the football student cheering section at the University of Illinois, also maintains the tradition by performing a 2000-member, 12-image card stunt during halftime of each home football game.

Card stunts have been the object of several famous college pranks, including the Great Rose Bowl Hoax and the 2004 Harvard-Yale Prank.

=== Olympics ===
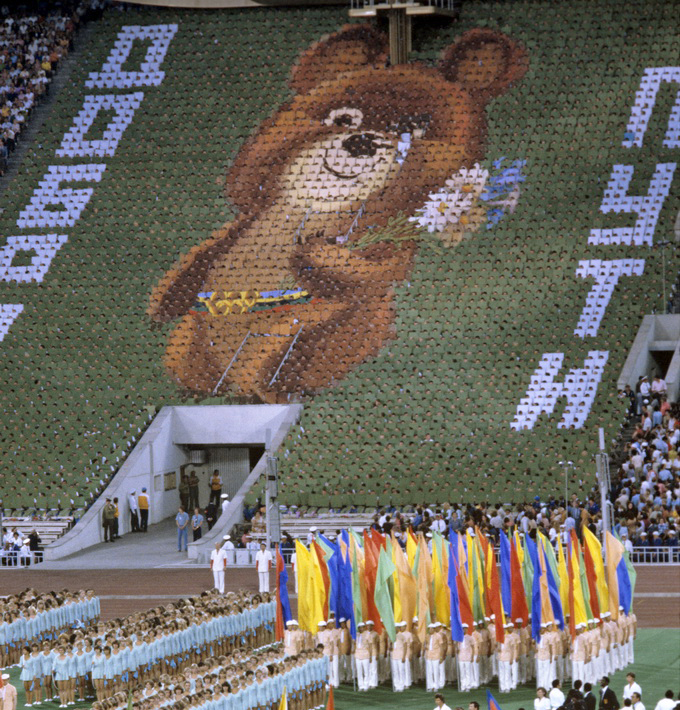
Misha in 1980, Moscow

At the opening and closing ceremonies of Moscow 1980 Summer Olympics in Moscow at the Olympic Stadium (now Luzhniki Stadium), some 6,800 Soviet Army cadets in front of the presidium created many images using this technique. The cadets practiced some six months to perfect their card formations. One of the most memorable was a Misha with a tear dropping, during the closing ceremonies of the event.

The opening ceremony of the 1984 Summer Olympics at the Los Angeles Memorial Coliseum boasted the single, biggest card stunt at the time. 85,000 spectators found colored cards in their seats (which had been preassigned by a computer simulation); and at one point the ceremony, just before the Parade of Nations segment, all 85,000 spectators flashed their cards to form supposedly all the flags of the nations in attendance.

This idea was tried again during the opening ceremony of the 2010 Winter Olympic Games held in Vancouver, Canada. But the idea was discarded when during rehearsals it was realized that the same effect would not be achieved due to the fact that BC Place was an indoor stadium, while the Los Angeles Coliseum was an open stadium and the ceremony took place in the late afternoon.

At the 2012 Summer Olympics opening ceremony, an effect similar to a card stunt was achieved by mounting a small panel with LED lights next to every spectator seat in the stadium, effectively turning the entire seating area into a big display for the audience seated on the opposite side. The show's producers, rather than the audience, controlled the light panels.

Card stunts involving large numbers of people have become a standard part of similar celebratory gatherings in countries such as North Korea.

== Fiction ==
In 1958, the science fiction author Arthur C. Clarke published "A Slight Case of Sunstroke" (also called "The Stroke of the Sun"), a short story in which a diabolical card stunt was used to kill an unpopular soccer referee. In the narrative, a large number of hostile spectators aim reflective program covers at the unfortunate umpire, who is vaporized in the resulting solar furnace.

In the 1992 episode of The Simpsons titled "Lisa The Beauty Queen," Homer imagines himself flying over the Super Bowl on the Duff blimp. One section of the stadium's patrons performs a card stunt, flipping up the cards to reveal "HI HOMER," then flipping the cards over to reveal a portrait of Homer himself.

== See also ==
- Wave (audience)
- Tifo
- Mass games
