= Football in Bangkok =

Location map of professional football clubs in the city of Bangkok

Football is the popular sport, both in terms of participants and spectators, in Bangkok.

== Introduction ==
In Bangkok, Thai League has been gaining popularity. There are many football clubs based in Bangkok.

== History ==
Bangkok has several of Thailand's significant football clubs, and the city is home to many football clubs.

Especially, Thai Farmers Bank F.C. won Asian Club Championship twice in 1994 and 1995.

Also, Police Tero reached the 2002–03 AFC Champions League final.

== Competitions ==
Bangkok held King's Cup since 1968

== Clubs ==
The table below lists all Bangkok clubs.

Division	Club	Founded	Status	Note
Thai League 2	Bangkok F.C.	1999	Professional	
Thai League	Bangkok United	1988	Professional	
Thai League	BG Pathum	1979	Professional	
Thai League	Muangthong United	1989	Professional	
Thai League	Police Tero	1992	Professional	
Thai League	Port F.C.	1967	Professional	

== Defunct Clubs ==
The table below lists all defunct Bangkok clubs.

Club	Founded	Dissolved	Status	Note
Air Force Central	1937	2019	Professional	
Bangkok Bank F.C.	1955	2008	Professional	
Thai Farmers Bank F.C.	1987	2000	Professional	

== Honours ==
- Thailand Football Champions (9)
  - Police Tero (2)
  - Royal Thai Air Force (2),
  - Krung Thai Bank (2)
  - Bangkok Bank (1)
  - Bangkok United (1)
  - Sinthana (1)

== Bangkok derby ==
There are many derbies between Football clubs based on Bangkok.

== Stadiums ==
- National Stadium (Supachalasai Stadium)
- Rajamangala National Stadium

== See also ==
- Football in Thailand
