= Suankularb Wittayalai School =

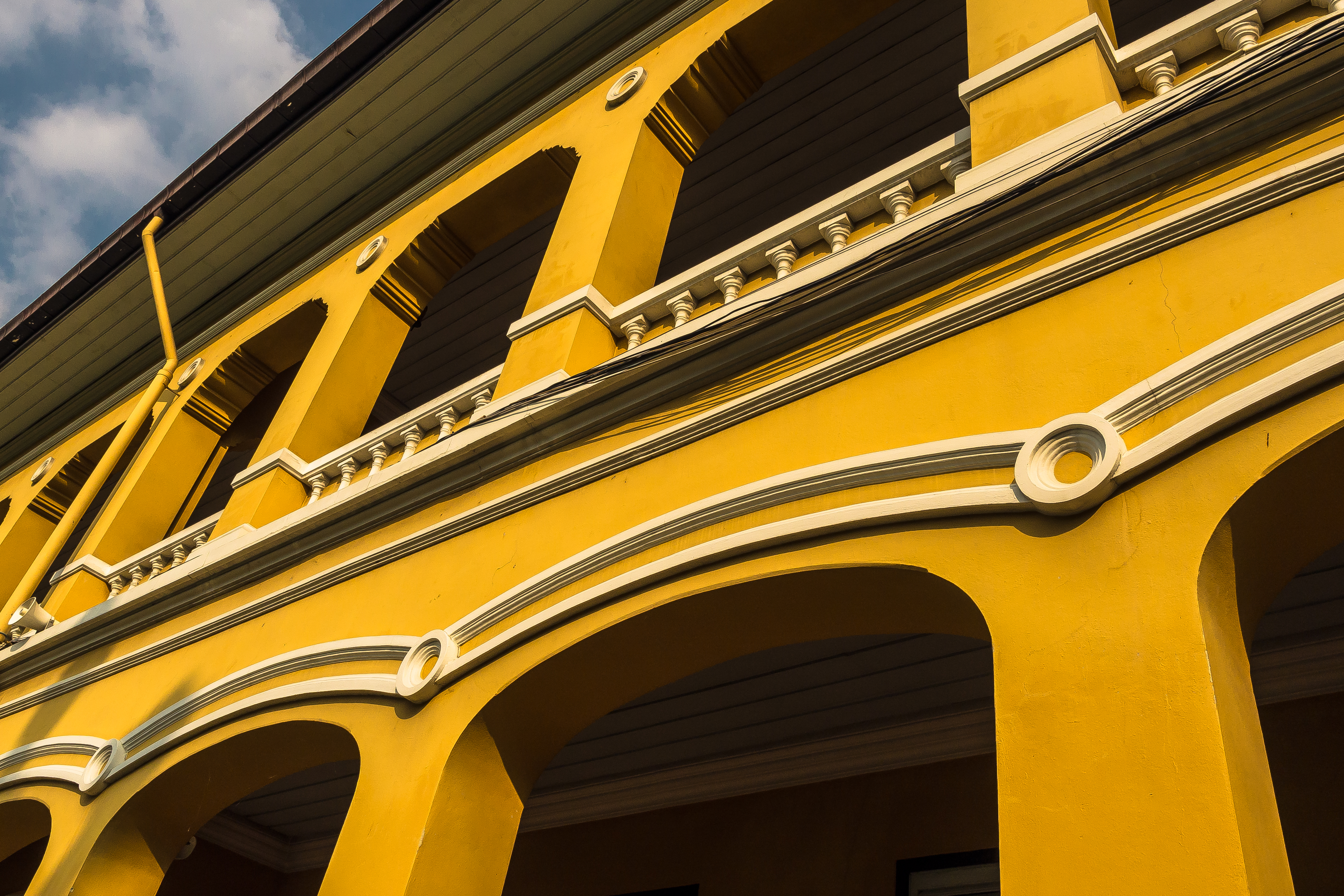
- Long Building (ตึกยาว)

Location
- 88 Tripetch Road, Wang Burapa Pirom; Phra Nakhon District, Bangkok, 10200; Thailand

Information
- School type: Public school (government-funded), Secondary school
- Motto: Suvijāno bhavaṃ hoti (สุวิชาโน ภวํ โหติ) (He who knows well will progress.)
- Religious affiliation: Buddhism
- Established: 8 March 1882; 144 years ago
- Founder: Chulalongkorn
- Status: Open
- School district: Phra Nakhon District
- Authority: Office of the Basic Education Commission
- Director: Phumisit Sukhontawong, Ed.D.
- Faculty: 193
- Grades: 7–12 (Mathayom 1–6)
- Gender: Boys' School
- Enrollment: 3,600 (2006 academic year)
- Classrooms: 73 (2023)
- Area: 18,492 m2
- Colours: Pink; Sky Blue
- Song: Banda rao บรรดาเรา March Chompu Fa มาร์ชชมพูฟ้า etc.
- Sports: Football
- Mascot: Rose
- National ranking: 1st (Lower-Secondary) 3rd (Upper-Secondary)
- Newspaper: Pimsuan
- Yearbook: Samarnmitr
- Website: www.sk.ac.th

Suankularb Wittayalai School (โรงเรียนสวนกุหลาบวิทยาลัย; Abbreviation: ส.ก. / S.K.) (also known as Suankularb College) literally Rose Garden College is an all-boys secondary school for grades 7 through 12 in Bangkok, Thailand. Founded by King Chulalongkorn in 1882 as a peer's school, its purpose was to educate the children of nobility and the royal household. Suankularb is the oldest public secondary school in the country. Suankularb alumni include eight Prime Ministers of Thailand, nine Supreme Court Chief Justices, five attorneys general, two Fortune Global 500 chief executives, scholars, as well as a number of prominent politicians and businessmen. Suankularb is a member of Jaturamitr group of the four oldest boys' schools in Thailand.

== History ==
"Suankularb" means 'rose garden' in Thai, as the original school was in the area of a rose garden in the Grand Palace. The school was established by King Chulalongkorn on 29 August 1882 and was originally for Royal Page Lieutenants. It has always benefited from royal patronage.

Under the patronage and guidance of King Chulalongkorn the school grew quickly, changing its focus from military training to a more broadly-based curriculum that reflected the needs of its students. The number of students rapidly swelled to many hundreds. Some were relocated to other educational institutes outside the Grand Palace area (1893) such as Sunanthalai Garden and Thepsirin Temple school, and to its present site, originally donated by Wat Lieb (or Rachaburana Temple) in 1910. The opening of the first building at this site (called the Memorial Suan Kularb Building, but known among students as "the long building" because for many years it was the longest building in the country) was presided over by King Rama V. At this event he declared the importance of education as a means of developing the country.

The school has two shrines. The first, called Luang Phor Suankularb, is a 9-inch-high (230 mm) metal Buddha donated by King Rama V. The second, in the shape of a many-armed elephant and with a water display, is called "Luang Phor Poo" and is near the main entrance. It is thought to house the protective spirit of the place (known as "Grandfather"), with students making daily offerings of flower garlands as a token of respect.

For over a century, Suankularb's alumni have played important social, political, governmental, military, and academic roles in Thailand. During its early days, English expatriates served as the board of directors, and made it possible for notable school leavers, such as MR Kukrit Pramoj, to continue their studies abroad at institutions such as Oxford University. Early alumni formed a major group of Thai scholars sent to study abroad yearly under the King's Scholarships, and later Thai government scholarships. Upon their return, they worked mostly in government agencies and academic institutions and helped in modernizing the country.

King Bhumibol Adulyadej gave Suankularb an award for being the best school in the country between 1973 and 1975. Students won first prize in the King's Scholarship and in the Mathematics Association of Thailand's quiz.

In 1981 a multi-purpose building and gymnasium known as Building Number Six was built to commemorate the school's centennial. It was opened by King Bhumibol Adulyadej on 30 July 1984. Every year on 29 August – the founding day of the school – all O.S.K ("Old Suankularb") students assemble in front of Building Six where they pay respects to the large statue of King Rama V there. An auditorium was built in 1995 and opened that year by Princess Maha Chakri Sirindhorn. The teaching of science and technology has been a central policy of the school. The school possesses an extensive library, with some rare and valuable books donated by former Prime Minister Thanin Kraivixien.

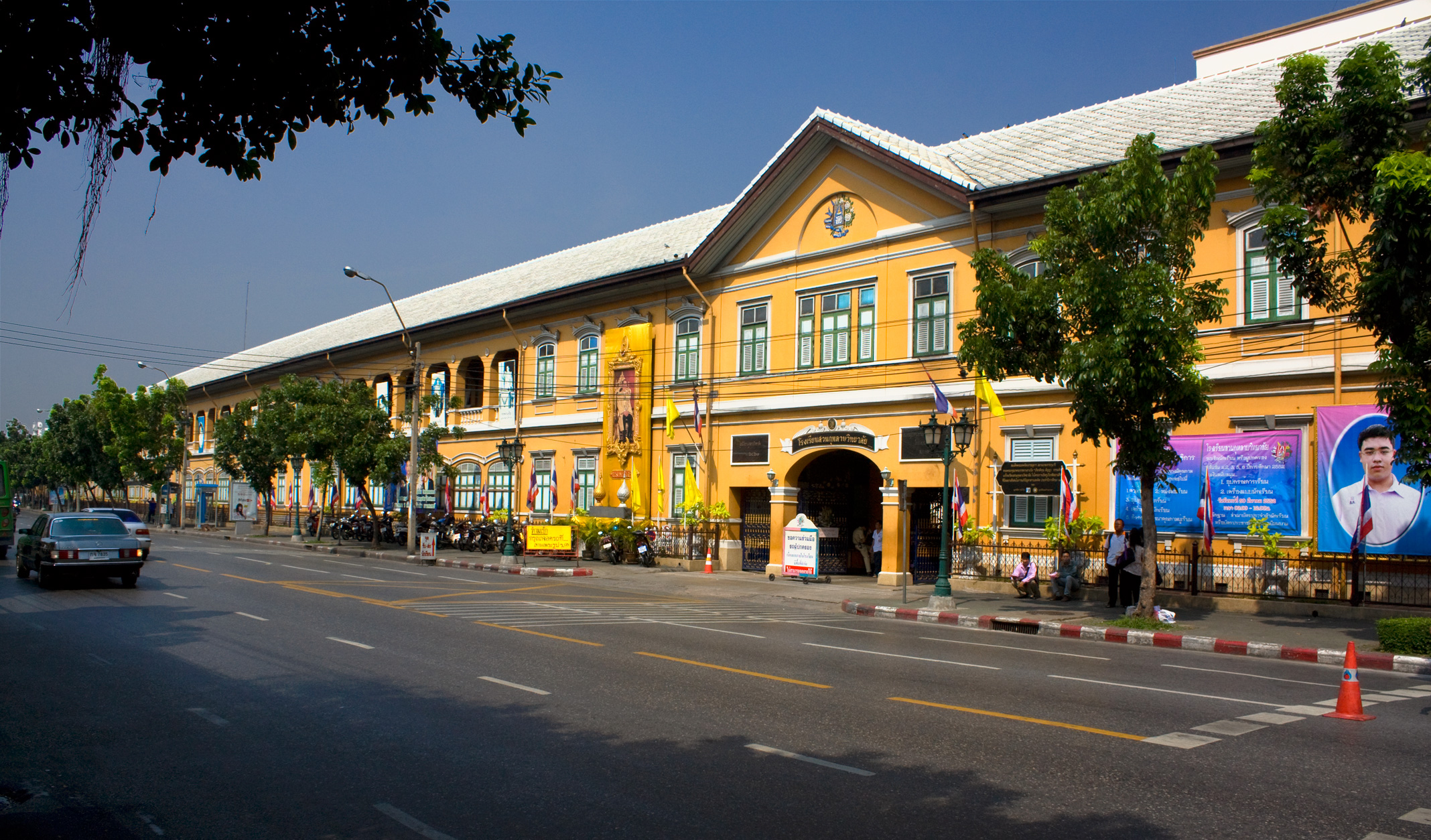
Suankularb Wittayalai School in 2009.

== Alumni ==
=== Prime Ministers of Thailand ===
- Phraya Manopakorn Nititada (Kon Hutasingha)
- Tawee Boonyaket
- Mom Rajawongse Seni Pramoj
- Pridi Phanomyong or Luang Praditmanutham
- Maj. Gen. Mom Rajawongse Kukrit Pramoj
- Thanin Kraivichien
- General Prem Tinsulanonda
- General Surayud Chulanont

=== Supreme Commander of Royal Thai Armed Forces ===
- General Sunthorn Kongsompong
- General Mongkol Ampornpisit
- General Surayud Chulanont
- General Ruangroj Mahasaranon

=== Commander-in-Chief of Royal Thai Army ===
- General Prem Tinsulanonda
- General Surayud Chulanont

=== Others ===
- Bidyalongkorn
- Phrathepyanmahamuni
- Pin Malakul
- Panupong Pituksung
- Phon Sangsingkeo
- Somsak Jeamteerasakul (90)
- Newin Chidchob (90)
- Watana Muangsook (90)
- Toon Bodyslam (115)
- Godji Tachakorn Boonlupyanun (121)
- Tay Tawan Vihokratana (128)
- March Chutavuth Pattarakampol (129)
- Singto Prachaya Ruangroj (130)
- Gunsmile Chanagun Arpornsutinan (132)
- James Teeradon Supapunpinyo (133)
- Bright Vachirawit Chivaaree (134)
- Gulf Kanawut Traipipattanapong (134)
- Sky Wongravee Nateetorn (134)
- First Chalongrat (134)
- First Kanaphan Puitrakul (135)
- Boom Tharatorn Jantharaworakarn (135)
- Satang Kittiphop Sereevichayasawat (138)
- Ford Allan Asawasuebsakul (139)
- Hong Pichetpong Chiradatesakunvong (140)
- Khunpol Pongpol Panyamit (140)
- Barcode Tinnasit Isarapongporn (141)
- Fong Patk Teeradejanon (142)
- Peem Wasupon Pornpananurak (143)
- Noeul Nuttarat Tangwai

== Events ==
- Jaturamitr Samakkee Traditional football competition (with Debsirin School, Assumption College, and Bangkok Christian College, biannually)
- Suankularb Exhibition (every four years)
