= Assumption College (Thailand) =

Private school in Bangkok, Thailand

- โรงเรียนอัสสัมชัญ
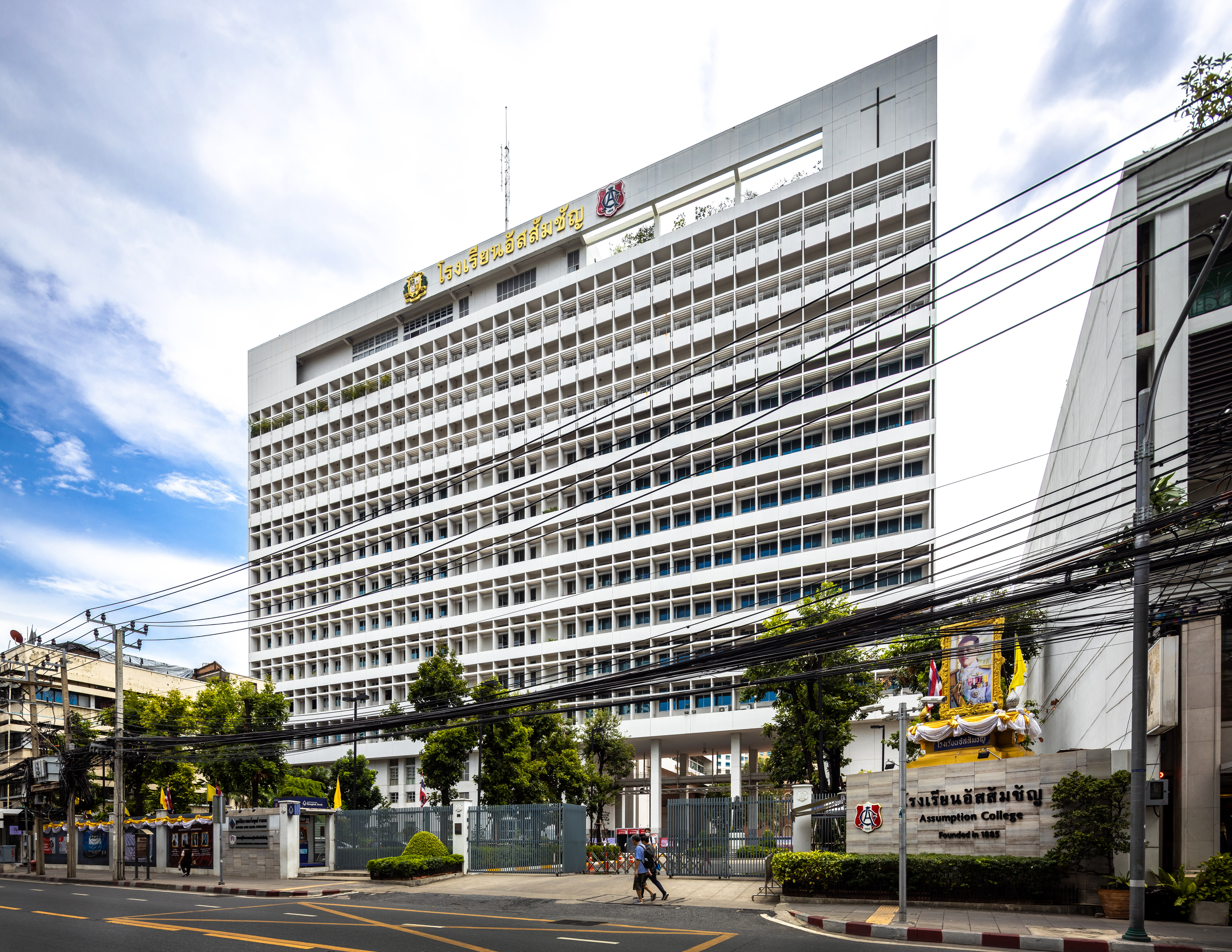

Location
- 26 Soi Charoenkrung 40, Bang Rak District, Bangkok, Thailand
- 13°43′23″N 100°30′58″E

Information
- Former names: Collège de l'Assomption (1885-1910)
- Type: Private Catholic Non-profit All-boys Basic (Primary and Secondary) education institution
- Motto: Labor omnia vincit (Latin) Work conquers all
- Religious affiliations: Roman Catholic; (Montfort Brothers of St. Gabriel)
- Patron saint: Blessed Virgin Mary “Our Lady of Assumption”
- Established: 16 February 1885; 141 years ago
- Founder: Father Emile-August Colombet
- Head Master: Brother Dechachai Sripicharn (2025–present)
- Language: Thai
- Colors: Red and white
- Song: Sadudee Assumption (สดุดีอัสสัมชัญ)
- Fight song: Boom Assump (บูมอัสสัม)
- Mascot: Red Eagle
- Website: www.assumption.ac.th

Assumption College (Thai: โรงเรียนอัสสัมชัญ) is a Catholic all-boys private school in Bangkok, Thailand. The school was founded by Father Emile-August Colombet on 16 February 1885, and is the first school founded by the Order of Brothers of Christian Instruction of St Gabriel. Assumption College is the third-oldest boys school in the country.

The institution is named in honor of the Blessed Virgin Mary under the title “Our Lady of the Assumption”. The school provides education for students from years 2nd through 13th Grade. The matriculation, especially in the first grade is highly competitive. Assumption College has a long list of distinguished former pupils including four Prime Ministers of Thailand, fifteen privy counselors, and three pupils among Thailand's top ten wealthiest.

Accordingly, it is one of four schools which participates in Jaturamitr Samakkee, a traditional football match by the four oldest boys' schools in Thailand: Suankularb Wittayalai School, Debsirin School, Bangkok Christian College and Assumption College.

== History ==
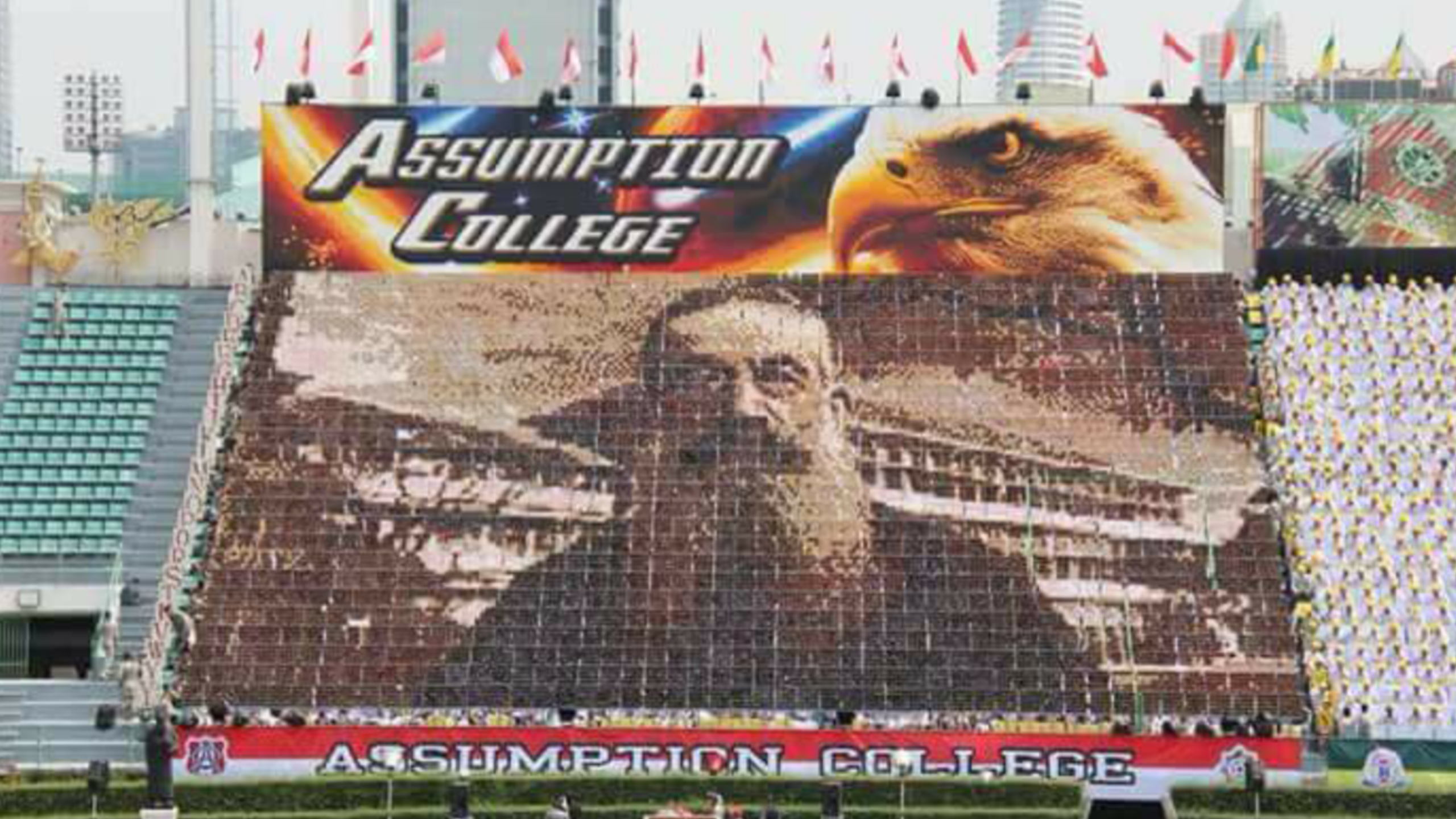
Card stunt depicting Father Emile August Colombet's picture

Assumption College traces its history to 1885, when Reverend Father Emile-August Colombet, a Catholic French missionary priest, opened a school in Bangkok. In those days before free public schools, Colombet realised many Thai children went without an education. Buddhist monks taught reading and writing in their temples, but attendance was not compulsory. Father Colombet opened his own primary school to help fill the need. The church school, named the Thai-French School, which used French and Thai as the medium of instruction.

Father Colombet's school was in an ordinary wooden house. Classes at the beginning were small; his first student was a Chinese-Thai, Siew Meng Tek. The number of students steadily increased; today more than 57,000 boys have been educated at Assumption College.

On 16 February 1885, the school was formally established under the name of Collège de l'Assomption. On the first day of school, there were 33 students. After that the school gradually became known and the demand for a new study hall was needed. Colombet sent a letter to King Chulalongkorn and the queen and solicited contributions and donations from noblemen and Thai and foreign merchants in Bangkok. The school became well-endowed.

On 15 August 1887, Crown Prince Maha Vajirunhis represented King Chulalongkorn in laying the cornerstone for the construction of the first study hall, later named the "old building" (Thai, "tuek gao").

In 1900, Father Colombet returned to France. He asked the Montfort Brothers of St. Gabriel to assume management of Assumption College. On 20 October 1901, the Superior General of the Brothers of St. Gabriel sent five reverend brothers to Thailand in order to continue the initiative of Father Colombet. They were Rev. Bro. Martin de Tours (the second director), Rev. Bro. Arbaire, Rev. Bro. Augustine, Bro. Gabriel Ferreti, and Rev. Bro. Hilaire, who pursued the objectives of Father Colombet. Assumption College was the first boys' school of the St. Gabriel Foundation in Thailand.

In 1910, the school changed its name from Collège de l'Assomption to Assumption College or AC.

When the number of students sharply increased, the existing study hall could not cater to the increasing numbers. At that time, the Brothers of Saint Gabriel established Assumption College Primary Section in 1965 in Sathon, Bangkok, on an area of six rai.

The primary section was approved and opened on 22 May 1966. The school was officially opened and blessed on 6 May 1967 by Archbishop Joseph Khiamsun Nittayo and Mom Luang Pin Malakul. The minister of education presided at the ceremony.

In 2002, during Brother Surasit Sukchai's term of governance, the English programme (EP) was introduced to serve students who wanted to prepare themselves for international study. The program started in Prathom Suksa 1 and in Mathayom Suksa 1 in the first year. Now the program offers complete primary and secondary levels or from Prathom Suksa 1 to Mathayom Suksa 6.

== School symbol ==
The symbol of Assumption College is a coat of arms. The blue English abbreviation AC is placed mid-center of the coat of arms. Underneath the school's abbreviation is "1885", the year of the college's formal establishment by Colombet. The red and white colors on the coat of arms remind us to honour the nation, religion, and the king. White represents purity and red represents bravery.

== Head Masters / Directors ==
Years in office	Name
1885–1902	Rev. Fr. Emile August Colombet
1902–1920, 1929–1932	Bro. Martin de Tours
1920–1929, 1938–1941	Bro. Michel
1932–1938	Bro. Frederic Jean
1941–1947	Bro. Montfort
1947–1952, 1954–1955	Bro. Hubert Cousin
1952–1954	Bro. Urbain Gloriau
1955–1960	Bro. Donatien
1960–1961	Bro. John Mary
1961–1965	Bro. Robert Richard
1965–1973, 1986–1992	Bro. Viriya Chandavarodom
1973–1979	Bro. Vicharn Songsiengchai
1979–1986	Bro. Chumphol Deesutchit
1992–1998	Bro. Loechai Lavasut
1998–2004, 2012	Bro. Surasit Sukchai
2004–2012	Bro. Dr. Anant Prichavudhi
2012–2019, 2025–Present	Bro. Dr. Dechachai Sripicharn
2019–2022	Bro. Dr. Sakda Sakhonthawat
2022–2025	Bro. Dr. Awut Silaket

== Buildings ==
=== Secondary Section ===
- Assumption Building (ตึกอัสสัมชัญ) (1890–1970) the first building of Assumption College. King Rama V made a contribution of 50 chang and the queen 25 chang. On 15 August 1887, Crown Prince Maha Vajirunhis laid the foundation stone. On 17 December 1970, the "tuek gao" was demolished to make space for the F. Hilaire Memorial.
- Suwan Somphoch Building (ตึกสุวรรณสมโภช) (1951–2001) built for the 80th anniversary of Assumption College. The first hall of the school.
- Assumption 100 years Building (ตึกอัสสัมชัญ 100 ปี) (1985–2004) built for the 100th anniversary of Assumption College. It is a multipurpose building.
- Colombet Building (ตึกกอลมเบต์) (1936 – present) is the oldest building of Assumption College, used for English program students
- F. Hilaire Building (ตึกฟ.ฮีแลร์) (1972 – present) is the second oldest building. This building was opened by King Bhumibol Adulyadej. This building is used for lower secondary students (grades 7–9).
- Assumption 2003 Building (อาคารอัสสัมชัญ 2003) (2003–present) is a 13-storey building and the tallest building at the school. It was designed by alumni architect Ajaphol Dusitanond. The building is mixed-use including the classrooms of upper secondary students (grades 10–12), seven lifts (six for students and one for teachers), labs, school's shop, museum, four auditorium rooms and the director's penthouse on the top of the building.
- Saint Louis-Marie Memorial Building (อาคารนักบุญหลุยส์-มารีย์) (2007–present) is the newest building at the school. The building consists of a canteen, library, basketball court and grand hall.

== Name ==
The word "Assumption" in Catholic doctrine is a reference to the Assumption of the Blessed Virgin Mary. The school motto is "Labor Omnia Vincit" (English: "Work Triumphs All").

== Campuses ==
Assumption College has several branches in Thailand, including:

- Assumption College "Primary Section", Bangkok
- Assumption College "Secondary Section", Bangkok

=== Other campuses in Thailand ===
- Assumption College Lampang
- Assumption College Nakhon Ratchasima
- Assumption College Rayong
- Assumption College Samutprakarn
- Assumption College Sriracha
- Assumption College Thonburi
- Assumption College Ubon Ratchathani
- Assumption Commercial College

== Notable alumni ==
The alumni of Assumption College are called Assumptionists (อัสสัมชนิก).

Here are several notable alumni of Assumption College

=== Prime Ministers of Thailand ===
- Phraya Manopakorn Nititada (1^{st})
- Khuang Aphaiwong (4^{th})
- Seni Pramoj (6^{th})
- Sanya Dharmasakti (12^{th})
- Anutin Charnvirakul (32^{nd})

=== Scholars, Arts and Architects ===
- Phraya Anuman Rajadhon, modern Thailand's most remarkable scholars; a self-trained linguist, anthropologist and ethnographer who later became an authority on the culture of Thailand.
- Sulak Sivaraksa, the writer and scholar.
- Krisda Arunvongse na Ayudhya, the former governor of Bangkok, an architectural lecturer.
- Puey Ungphakorn, a former governor of the Bank of Thailand.

=== Business Leaders ===
- Chartsiri Sophonpanich, president of Bangkok Bank

=== Religious and Spiritual Leaders ===
- Michael Michai Kitbunchu, the first Cardinal of Thailand, the second Archbishop of Bangkok from 1971 to 2009.
- Francis Xavier Kriengsak Kovitvanit, the second Cardinal of Thailand and current Archbishop of Bangkok since 2009.
- Phra Paisal Visalo, Buddhist monk and environmental activist.

=== Entertainment ===
- Bundit Ungrangsee, international symphonic conductor.
- Jakkaphong Jakrajutatip, media entrepreneur.
- Boy Pakorn, actor (up to lower secondary).
- Jitaraphol Potiwihok, doctor and actor.
- Nawat Phumphotingam, actor.
- Suppapong Udomkaewkanjana, TV and film actor.
- Metawin Opas-iamkajorn, actor and model (primary level).
- Krit Amnuaydechkorn, model, actor and singer.
- Peemapol Panichtamrong, actor.
- Wachirawit Ruangwiwat, actor.
- Pongtiwat Tangwancharoen, actor and model.
- Pawat Chittsawangdee, actor.
- Wachirakon Raksasuwan, singer.
- Nattakit Chaemdara, singer and model.
- Suvijak Piyanopharoj, actor and singer.
