= Debsirin School =

Government school in Bangkok, Thailand

Coordinates: 13°44′49.2″N 100°30′57.2″E

- โรงเรียนเทพศิรินทร์
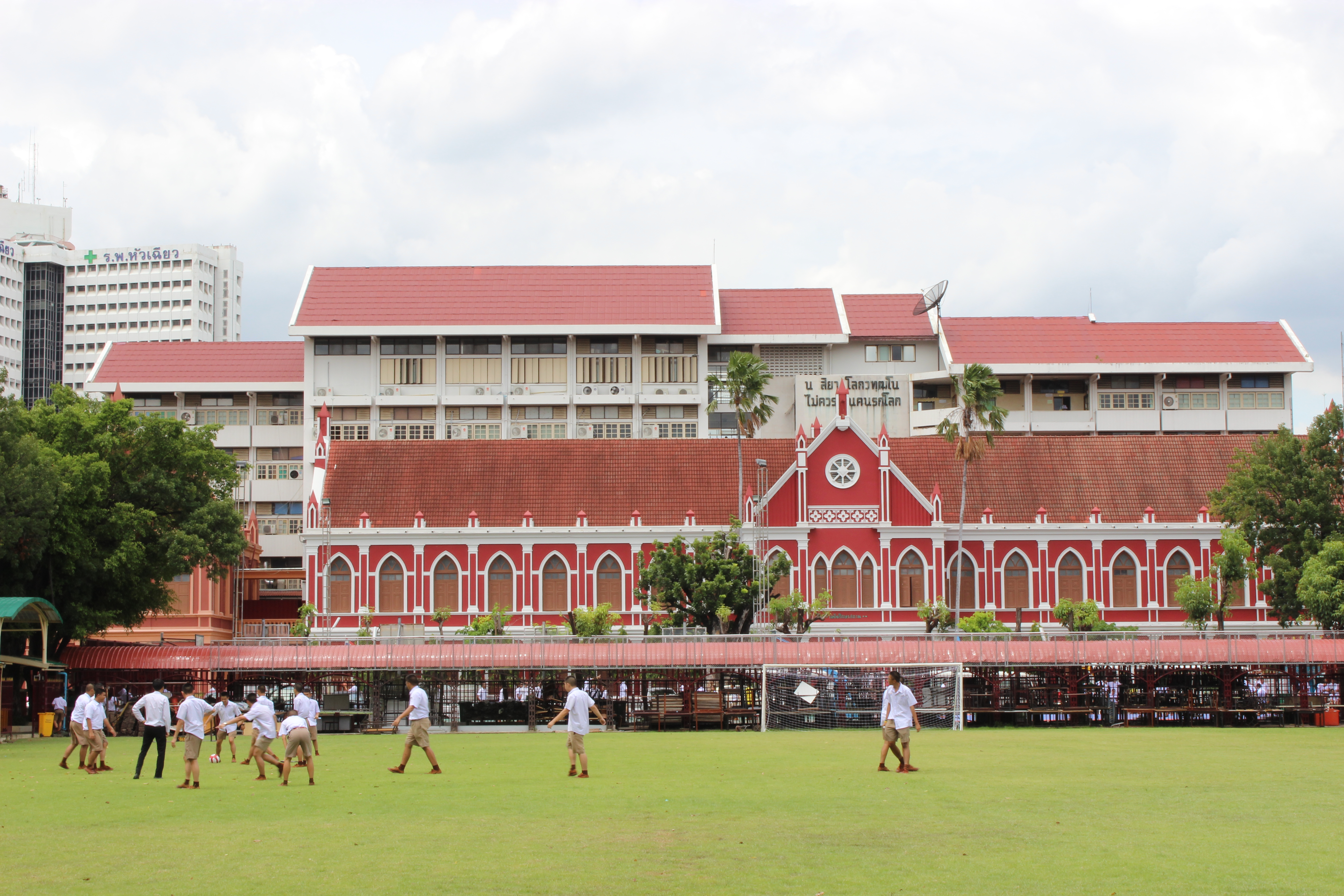
- Maen Suksa Sathan Building (ตึกแม้นศึกษาสถาน)

Location
- 1466 Krungkasem Road, Wat Thepsirintharawat Subdistrict, Pom Prap Sattru Phai District, Bangkok, Thailand

Information
- Type: Public all-boys secondary school
- Motto: Na siyā lokavaḍḍhano (Be not a useless person)
- Established: 15 March 1885
- Founder: King Chulalongkorn
- Director: Withan Phromsinthusak
- Color
- Song: Ahogumara
- Website: debsirin.ac.th

Debsirin School (Thai: โรงเรียนเทพศิรินทร์, pronounced [tʰêːp.sì.rīn]) is a boys' secondary school in Bangkok, Thailand. Founded by King Chulalongkorn in 1885, its alumni include King Ananda Mahidol, Malaysia's founding father Tunku Abdul Rahman, more than 70 cabinet members, including five prime ministers, and numerous military leaders and dignitaries. Debsirin School participates in Jaturamitr Samakkee, a biennial traditional association football (soccer) competition between the four oldest boys' schools in Thailand.

== History ==
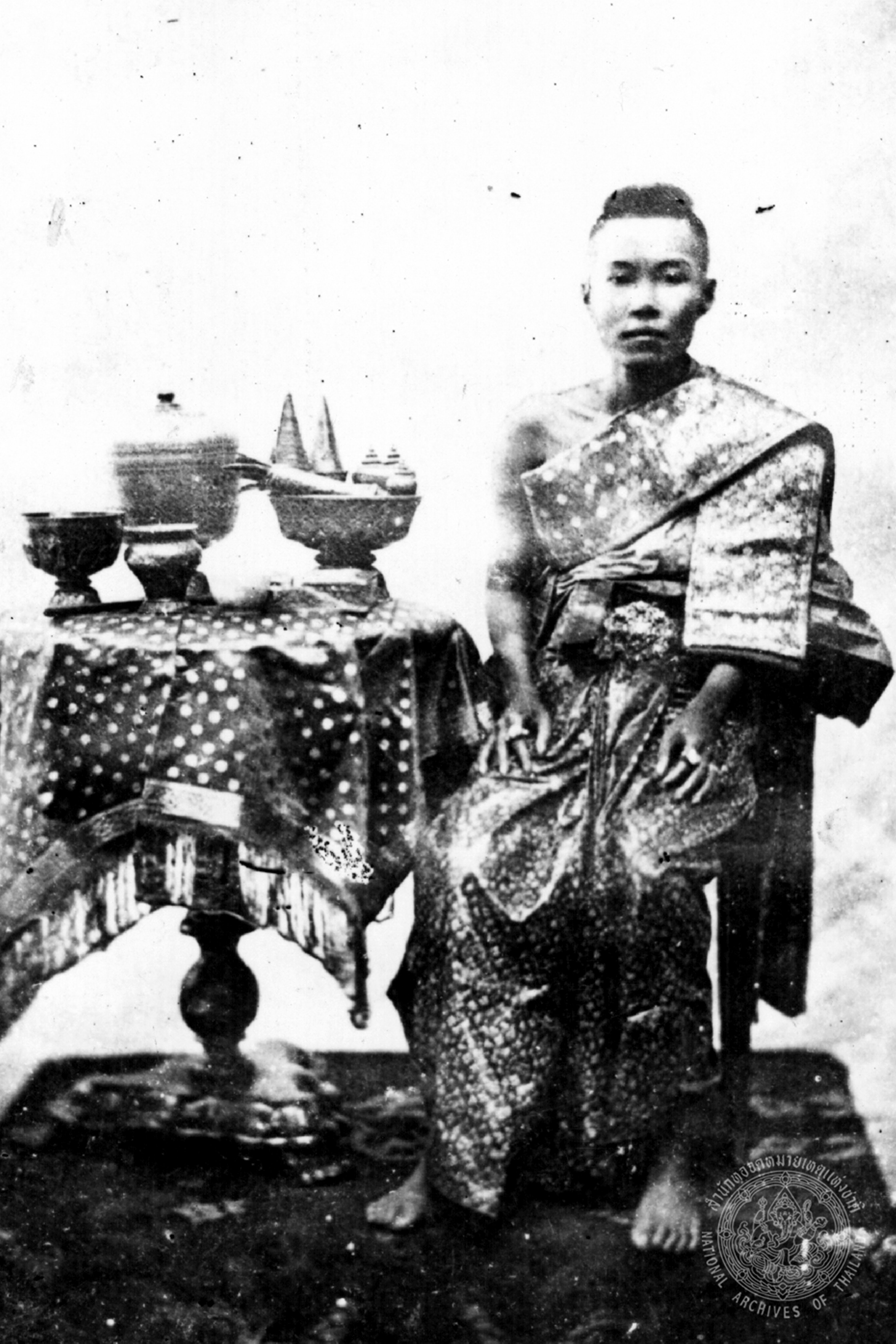
Queen Debsirindra

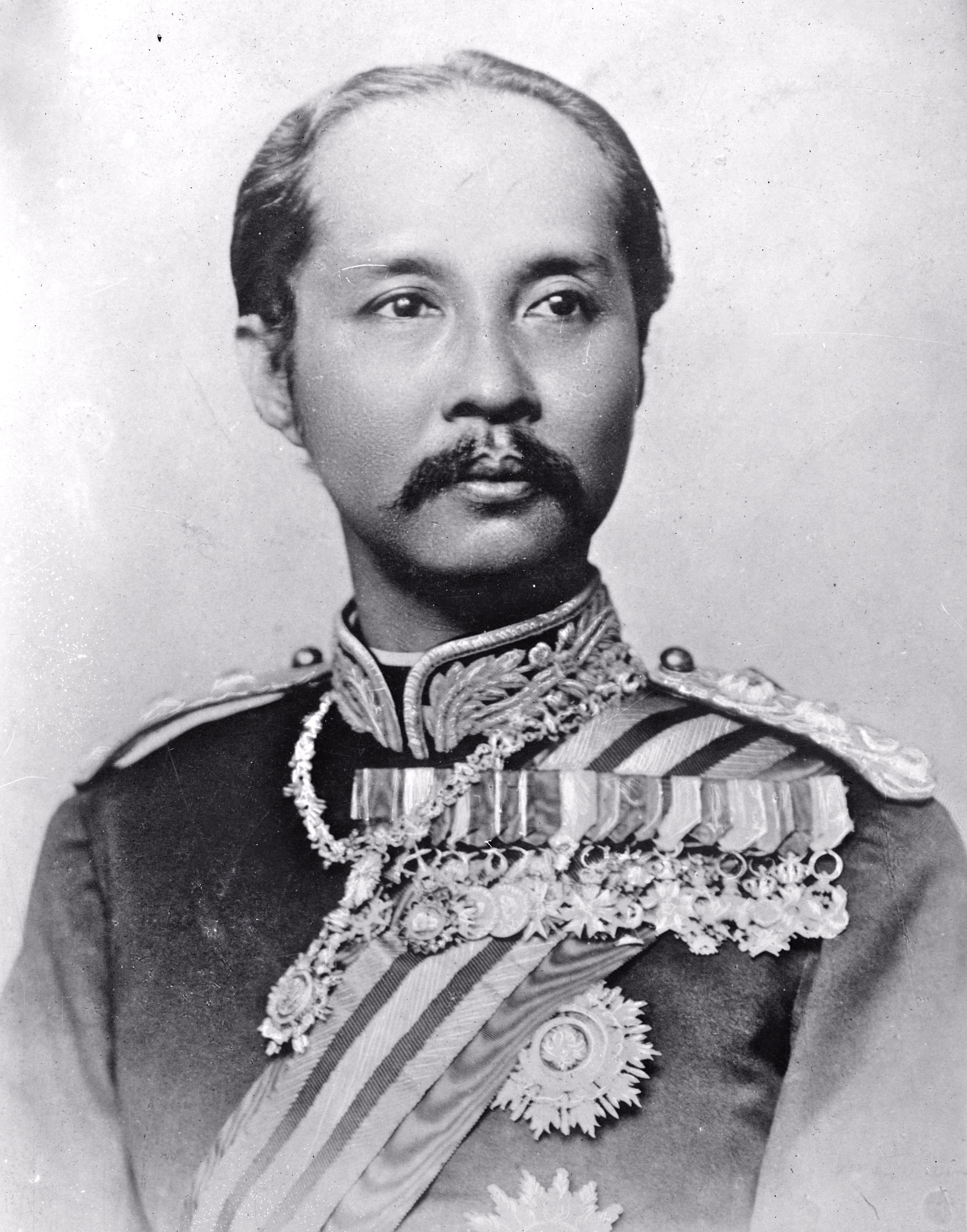
King Chulalongkorn (Rama V)

The fifth Abbot of Wat Thep Sirin Thrawat had donated land for a school as early as 1702. King Mongkut had tried to modernize Siam, enabling it to stand up to the European powers. He was succeeded by his 15-year-old son, Chulalongkorn, who reigned as Rama V, now known as Rama the Great. Rama V was the first Siamese king to have a Western education, having been taught by a British governess, Anna Leonowens. As Bangkok developed as the capital of the new nation of Siam, Rama V's government began several nationwide development projects, despite financial hardship. New roads, bridges, railways, hospitals and schools mushroomed throughout the country, all funded from the national budget.

In a speech at a student award ceremony in 1884, the King said;

"... Academic subjects have been acceptable and admirable because they have been precious subjects for leaders like the kings. All citizens deserve to know because they enable everything to be successful. " "... The princes, royal family members, bureaucrats and all citizens will have equal educational opportunities. Therefore, education will be the first priority which I will try to develop to become prosperous. "

In 1885, he founded the school, naming it in honour of his mother, Debsirindra Queen Ramphoei Phamaraphirom (Thai: รำเพยภมราภิรมย์). The school opened with 53 pupils.

In 1902, the first school building was opened, and King Chulalongkorn named it the "Maen Naruemit Building."

During World War II Thailand, under Field Marshal Plaek Pibulsongkram, was allied with the Axis powers and declared war on the United Kingdom and United States when the Japanese attacked Pearl Harbor. Bangkok suffered heavily in the subsequent Allied bombing raids and Debsirin School, strategically located near the railway, was not spared. Most teaching buildings (Maen Naruemit and Choduek Laohasetthi) were destroyed. They were later rebuilt by the alumni and the Ministry of Education. The main building, renamed Maen Suksa Stan Building, was built in the Gothic style.

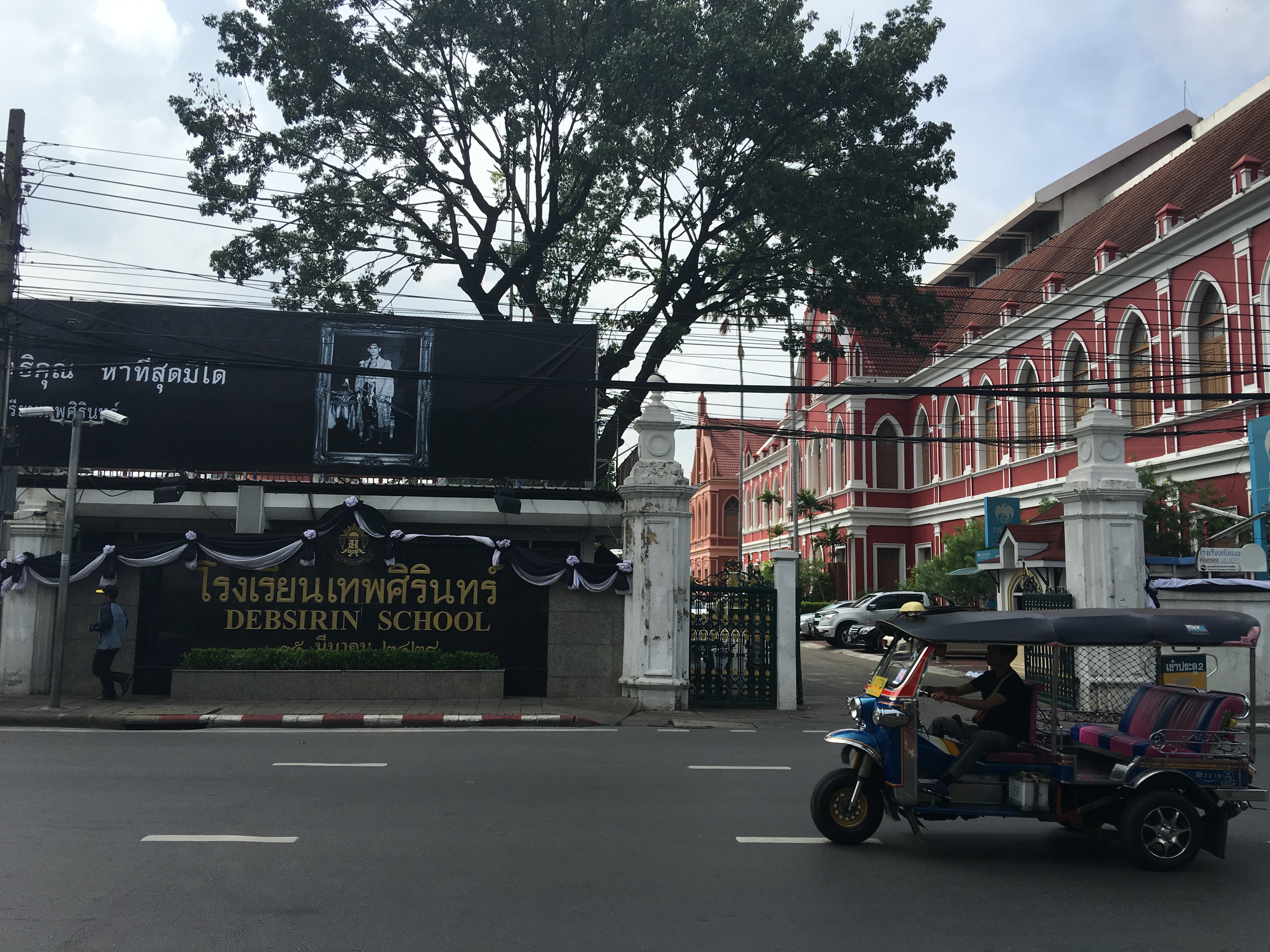
Debsirin School in 2016

Today, Debsirin School has a strong alumni network (Debsirin Alumni Association) under royal patronage, several prime ministers of Thailand and members of the royal family. The school also operates as a living museum, containing exhibits on the history of the school and the development of Thai education.

== Curriculum ==
Lower Secondary (M.1-M.3)

- English Program (EP)
- Mini English Program (MEP)
- Standard Curriculum Program
- Enrichment Program of Science, Mathematics, Technology and Environment (SMTE)
- Gifted Science and Mathematics Program (GSMP)
- Chinese Program (CP)

Higher Secondary (M.4-M.6)

- Science-Math Program
- Enrichment Program of Science, Mathematics, Technology and Environment (SMTE)
- Gifted Science and Mathematics Program (GSMP)
- English Program (EP)
- Intensive English Program (IEP)
- Arts-Math Program
- Arts-Language Program
- Intensive Chinese Program (ICP)
- Mini English Program (MEP)

== Surrounding places ==
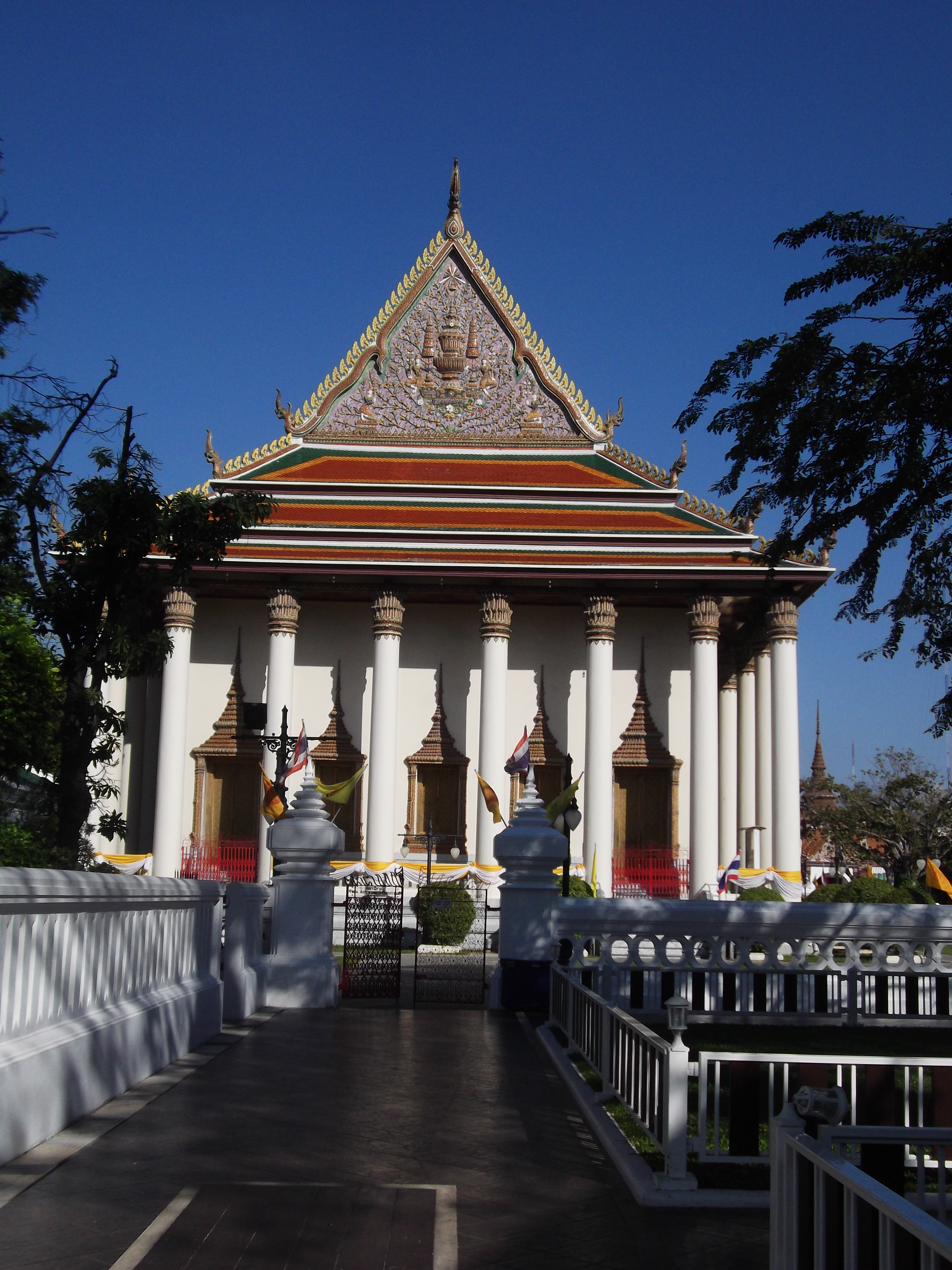
Wat Debsirindrawas Ratchaworawiharn

=== Wat Debsirindrawas Ratchaworawiharn ===
Wat Debsirindrawas Ratchaworawiharn is a second class royal temple built at the command of King Rama V as a dedication to Queen Debsirindra, and named Wat Debsirindrawas in 1876. Important architecture includes the ordination hall of Wat Thepsirin, which is large and beautifully decorated with gold leaf patterns and door and window arches, carved ceilings, and royal decorations . The ordination hall houses many important Buddha images, such as Phra Nirantarai, the Buddha image of King Rama IV, which was brought here in 1878 according to King Rama IV's wishes.

== Debsirin Network ==
List of Debsirin School Network
No.	Name	Address
1.	Debsirin School	1466 Krungkasem Road Watthepsirin Pom Prap Sattru Phai District Bangkok
2.	Debsirin Romklao school	2 Soi ICD 8 Khlong Samprawet Lat Krabang Bangkok 10520
3.	Debsirin Klong 13 Pathumthani	37 Moo 4 Lam Luk Ka Pathum Thani 12150
4.	Debsirin Nonthaburi	Bang Kruai Muang Nonthaburi Nonthaburi 11130
5.	Debsirin Phukhae Saraburi School	175 Moo 1 Phukhae Saraburi 18240
6.	Debsirin Lat Ya Kanchanaburi	279 Moo 1 Lat Ya Kanchanaburi 71190
7.	Debsirin Khonkaen School	361 Moo 9 Khonkaen 40000
8.	Debsirin Chiang Mai School	248 Moo 2 Chiang Mai 50120
9.	Debsirin Samut Prakan School	799 Moo 6, Bang Mueang Mai, Samut Prakan 10270
10.	Debsirin 9 School Royal Project under Royal Patronage	Moo 5 Chiang Mai 50320
11.	Debsirin Chonburi School (Uthok Upatham)	22 Moo 4 Phanat Nikhom Chonburi

== Notable alumni ==
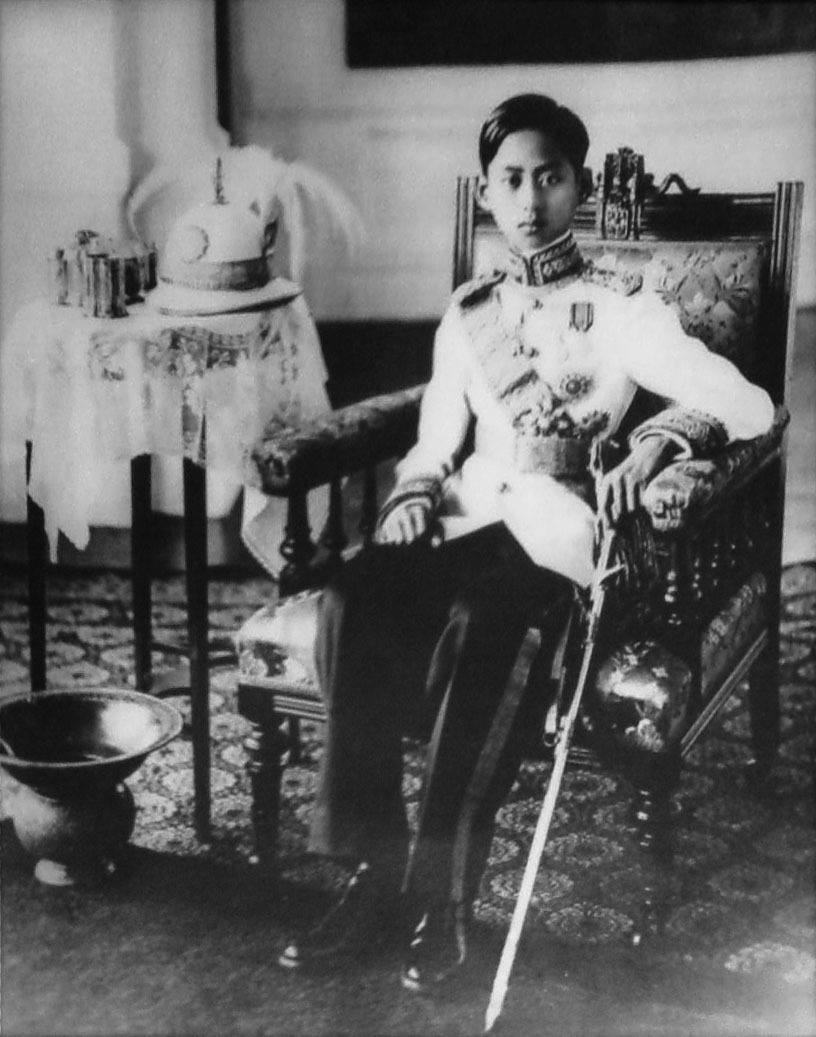
King Ananda Mahidol in 1939

Thai royalty

- Birabongse Bhanudej; Prince Bira of Siam, Formula One racing driver
- Ananda Mahidol; Rama VIII King of Thailand

Prime ministers of Thailand

- Khuang Aphaiwong; 4th prime minister of Thailand
- Seni Pramoj; 6th prime minister of Thailand
- Thawan Thamrongnawasawat; 8th prime minister of Thailand
- Chatichai Choonhavan; 17th prime minister of Thailand

Other politicians

- Chuvit Kamolvisit; politician
- Tunku Abdul Rahman; 1st prime minister of Malaysia

Writers

- Kulap Saipradit; or Sri Burapha Thai novelist
- Bhanubandhu Yugala; Thai film director, producer and screenwriter
- Sombat Metanee; Thai Actor and film director
- Prabda Yoon; Thai Writer, graphic designer
