= Bangkok Christian College =

Coordinates: 13°43′14″N 100°31′23″E

- Coat of Arms
- Bangkok, Thailand

Information
- Type: Private school
- Motto: Do not be overcome by evil, but overcome evil with good Romans 12:21
- Established: September 30, 1852; 174 years ago
- Locale: 35 Pramuan, Si Lom, Bang Rak, Bangkok, Thailand
- Principal: Suphakij Jitklongsub
- Teaching staff: 400
- Grades: 1–12
- Gender: All-boys
- Enrollment: 6,000
- Campus type: Urban
- Color: Purple-Gold
- Mascot: Chongkho (Phanera purpurea)
- Website: www.bcc.ac.th

Bangkok Christian College (abbreviated as BCC; Thai: โรงเรียนกรุงเทพคริสเตียนวิทยาลัย) is a private boys' school in the financial district of Si Lom, Bangkok. The school has a longstanding reputation as one of the most prestigious and highly selective schools in Thailand.

Bangkok Christian College was established on 30 September 1852 by American Presbyterian missionaries. Bangkok Christian College is the oldest school in Thailand. Originally in Thonburi, the school moved to its present site in Bang Rak District in 1902.

The school has about 400 academic staff, both Thai and foreigner, and 6,000 students in 12 grades. Although it is a Christian school, only about five percent of students are Christians. Most students are Buddhists, but it is popular with students of all faiths due to its strong reputation.

== History ==
Bangkok Christian College, the first private boys school in the Kingdom of Thailand, was founded on 30 September 1852, in tambons Koodeechine and Samray, Thonburi, with the blessing of King Rama IV. In 1902, the school was moved to Pramuan Road. King Rama V donated 20 chang to help defray the cost of land for the development of the new campus.

== Intensive English Program ==
The BCC Intensive English Program (IEP) was created in 2002 to increase students' ability to understand and use English confidently and effectively in a range of different contexts. This program will let students learn and practice English with a native speaker.

== English Immersion Program (EIP) ==
Bangkok Christian College took part in one of the first pilot projects for native-English education in Thailand. Commissioned by the Office of Private Education of the Thai Ministry of Education, it has provided an English-Thai bilingual education program to its students since 1995. Beginning with Prathom-1 (Grade 1), it has expanded the EIP by one grade level each year. The school provides a full K-12 program (Prathom-1 to Matthayom-6).

Native English-speaking teachers, as well as the Thai teachers, instruct students in English, mathematics, science, computer technology, health education, physical education, music, and social studies.

== School colors ==
Flag of Bangkok Christian College

Bangkok Christian College's school colors are purple and gold. Purple is the color of royalty. It is the combination of red (Thai national color) and blue (the color of the monarchy), so purple signifies the nation and the king. Gold is the color of value. It is mostly yellow, the color of Buddhism, which is the primary religion of Thailand.

== Campus ==
BCC Campus

Bangkok Christian College's current campus is in the heart of the city, in Bang Rak, in the Silom District. The school is a one-minute walk from the Surasak BTS skytrain station.

== Student management ==
Bangkok Christian College School separates students in different buildings according to their grade level. Primary students (about 2650) learn at the Ari Semprasat Building and the John A. Eakin Building, junior high school students (about 1325) learn at the M.B. Palmer Building, and senior high school students (about 1325) learn at the BCC 150th Anniversary Building, which is the only building that is separate from the main area of the school. The only way that senior high students can go to the main area during the school time is via a bridge between the M.B. Palmer Building and the 150th Anniversary Building. There are about 400-500 students in each grade, and students are separated into 12 different rooms, with about 30-60 students for room numbers 1-9 and about 23-40 students for room numbers 10–12.

Students are organized in high school according to their program, major, and examination score. Normally, students will learn in that room until they graduate, unlike the primary school and junior high school whose students change rooms every year. For senior high school students, room numbers 1-2 are the "King and Queen Mathematics-Science Class", with room 1 reserves for BCC SMART Program students, for students with high scores for their grade in the mathematics-science program; room numbers 3-5 are the "Regular Mathematics-Science Class", for normal students in the mathematics-science program; room number 7 are the "King and Queen Class" for students with high scores on that grade in the language-math or language-art programs altogether with BCC SMART Program students: room number 8 - 9 is the "Regular Class" for normal students in the language-math or language-art program: room number 10 is the "Sports Class" for athletes; and room numbers 11-14 are the "EIP Class" for students in the EIP program.

== Notable alumni ==
- Prime Ministers of Thailand
  - Pote Sarasin, (21 September - 24 December 1957)
  - Anand Panyarachun, (7 March 1991 - 7 April 1992) (1st time) and (10 June - 23 September 1992) (2nd time)
- People from entertainment Industry
  - Nonkul Chanon Santinatornkul, actor
  - Chinawut Indracusin, singer-actor
  - Sing Harit Cheewagaroon, actor
  - Yuke Songpaisan, actor
  - Inn Sarin, actor
  - Neo Trai Nimtawat, actor and former National Youth Team Basketball player
  - Winny Thanawin Pholcharoenrat, actor
  - Sadanont Durongkavarojana, actor
  - Suppakarn Jirachotikul, T-POP idol and actor
  - Supha Sangaworawong, actor and former National Team Swimmer
- Notable Scholar
  - Pavin Chachavalpongpun, professor at Kyoto University
- Sportspeople
  - Aryan Bose, footballer
  - Maycon Cardozo, footballer
