= Panitan Budkaew =

Thai actor (born 2003)

- ปณิธาน บุตรแก้ว
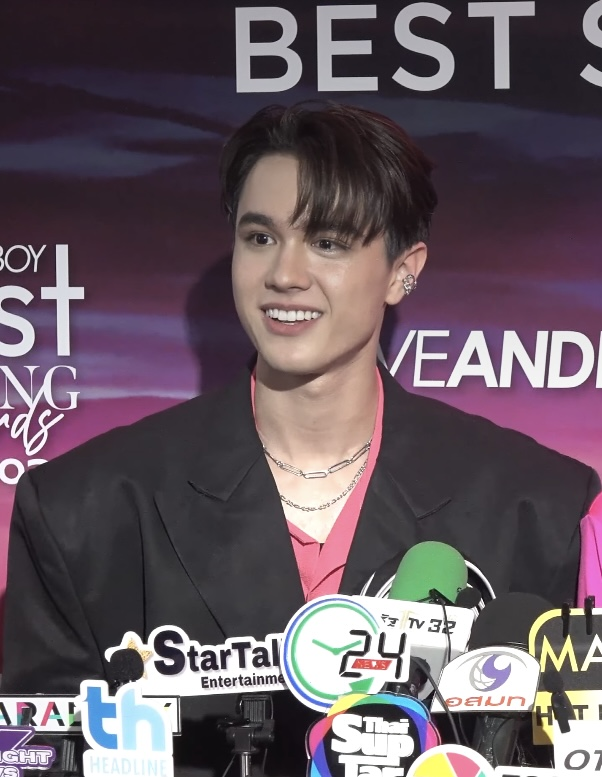
- Panitan in 2024
- Born: Mike Theodor Platte; 31 January 2003 (age 23); Stockholm, Sweden
- Other name: Mikey
- Education: Rangsit University
- Occupation: Actor
- Years active: 2022–present
- Agent: Channel 3 HD (2022–present)
- Notable work: Maj., M.D., M.L. Chatklao Juthathep – Duangjai Dhevaprom (2024); Katha Sripaisanwanich (Tha) – The Sweetest Taboo (2024)
- Height: 180 cm (5 ft 11 in)

Mike Theodor Platte (Thai: ไมค์ เทโอดอร์ พลัตเต้; born 31 January 2003), known professionally as Panitan Budkaew (Thai: ปณิธาน บุตรแก้ว), nicknamed Mikey, is a Thai-German actor, best known for his role as Mom Luang Chatklao Juthathep in the 2024 Thai television series Duangjai Dhevaprom.

== Early life and education ==
Mike Theodor Platte was born on January 31, 2003, in Stockholm, Sweden. He is the only son in the family and was known to his family as Pussgurka. At the age of 3, he permanently moved from Sweden back to Lampang, Thailand. Mike is quadrilingual. He speaks 4 languages; Swedish, Thai, English, and German. Mike graduated primary school from Anuban Lampang Khelangrat Anusorn School. During grade 5, he participated in the "GLOBE Student Research Competition 2014 (GLOBE SRC 2014) held by The Institute for the Promotion of Teaching Science and Technology (IPST)-The GLOBE Program Thailand" in which he carried out Environmental Science research on a topic "Comparison of The Soil Moisture Levels Around Stone Dam, Earthen Dam and Undammed Areas at Wat Monphayachae, Lampang Thailand" and was awarded for an outstanding oral presentation. Later, he was selected to present his research at the "GLOBE Learning Expedition (GLE) and Annual Partner Meeting" held in New Delhi, India, on 3 – 8 August 2014. He graduated with a high school diploma from Lampang Kanlayani School. In 2024, he graduated with a bachelor's degree from communication arts at Rangsit University with a 3.51 unweighted GPA.

== Career ==
During the time he lived in Lampang, he also worked as a crew team member at a restaurant. During his free time, he and his friends busked on the street by playing guitar to raise money for tuition. Charnchalard Dhaweesap, a famous Thai agent and producer, discovered him. Due to his talent and charisma, Dhaweesap then invited and encouraged him to the entertainment industry. He signed a contract with Channel 3 as an actor. In 2022, He began his acting debut as a leading role in the television classic series Duangjai Dhevaprom, starring with an actress, Narilya Gulmongkolpech. Later, he also played a protagonist in The Sweetest Taboo along with Peranee Kongthai and Marsha Vadhanapanich.

== Filmography ==
=== Television series ===
Year	English title	Original title	Role	Network	Notes	Ref.
2024	Duangjai Dhevaprom-Laorchan	ดวงใจเทวพรหม ลออจันทร์	Maj., M.D., M.L. Chatklao Juthathep	Channel 3/ Netflix	Lead role	
2024	Duangjai Dhevaprom-Kwanruetai	ดวงใจเทวพรหม ขวัญฤทัย	Maj., M.D., M.L. Chatklao Juthathep	Channel 3/ Netflix	Main role	
2024	Duangjai Dhevaprom-Jaipisut	ดวงใจเทวพรหม ใจพิสุทธิ์	Lt. Col., M.D., M.L. Chatklao Juthathep	Channel 3/ Netflix	Lead role	
2024	Duangjai Dhevaprom-Dujupsorn	ดวงใจเทวพรหม ดุจอัปสร	Lt. Col., M.D., M.L. Chatklao Juthathep	Channel 3/ Netflix	Lead role	
2024	Duangjai Dhevaprom-Poncheewan	ดวงใจเทวพรหม พรชีวัน	Col., M.D., M.L. Chatklao Juthathep	Channel 3/ Netflix	Lead role	
2024	The Sweetest Taboo	หวานรักต้องห้าม	Katha Sripaisanwanich (Tha)	Channel 3/ Viu	Main role	
TBA	Until Love Returns	จนกว่ารักจะคืนใจ		Channel 3	Main role	

== Stage performances ==
Year	Title	Role	Show time	Venue
2023	Moowis	Kriti	May 26–28, 2023	Auditorium room, 2nd floor, Building 15, College of Communication Arts, Rangsit University

== Hosting ==
=== Television ===
Year	Title	Types	Broadcast on	Broadcast time	Note	Ref.
2025	The Upgrade	Reality show	Workpoint TV	Every Sunday at 8:05 p.m. (October 12, 2025 - November 30, 2025)	with DJ Nui Thanawat	

== Discography ==
Year	Song title	With	Notes	Ref.
2024	"ถ้าเธอ OK" (Special version)	Narilya Gulmongkolpech	Duangjai Dhevaprom-Kwanreutai OST	
2024	"อย่าปล่อยมือ" (ดวงใจเทวพรหม Sports Day)	Yeena Salas, Kanawut Traipipattanapong, Narilya Gulmongkolpech, Eisaya Heosuwan, Tate Myron, Ranchrawee Uakoolwarawat, Kongthap Peak, Punpreedee Khumprom Rodsaward, Noppakao Dechaphatthanakun	ดวงใจเทวพรหม Sports Day	
2024	"It Had to be You" (Cover Version)	Solo	The Sweetest Taboo OST	

== Concerts/fan meetings ==
Year	Title	Date	City	Country	Venue	Notes	Ref.
2022	Jobbiijob Clan Opening	May, 22	Bangkok	Thailand	Major Ratchayothin	Guest	
2024	LAORCHAN FUN&FURIOUS	March, 30	Chonburi	Thailand	Suan Kularb Wittayalai Auditorium, Suan Kularb Wittayalai School	Special Guest	
2024	ดวงใจเทวพรหม Sports Day รู้แพ้ รู้ชนะ รู้ใจคุณ	June, 2	Bangkok	Thailand	Union Hall,Union Mall		
2024	Dhevaprom Fan Con After Party	August, 25	Bangkok	Thailand	Paragon Hall,Siam Paragon		
2024	The Capital of Cetaphil Skin x MIKEY Fan Meeting	November, 24	Bangkok	Thailand	Centerpoint, Siam Square		
2024	Lost in Gulf's Space Day	December, 1	Bangkok	Thailand	MCC HALL, The Mall Lifestore Bangkapi	Guest	
2025	Fansign: Photobook MIKEY One Fine Day	January, 17	Bangkok	Thailand	Maleenont Tower		
2026	Mikey’s Afternoon Fiesta: The Solstice Birthday Party	February, 7	Bangkok	Thailand	Phenix Auditorium Hall		

== Brand endorsement and advertising ==
Year	Brand/Product/Advertising	Title	Notes	Ref.
2024	BAOJI	Presenter		
2024	OPPO A3 Series		with Sirilak Kwong, Kornnaphat Sethratanapong	
2024	Fineline	Friend of Fineline	with Noppakao Dechaphatthanakun	
2024	Maybeliine Super Stay Teddy Tint			
2024	MLB Fall/Winter 2024		with Narilya Gulmongkolpech	
2024	Belotero	Brand Ambassador	with Tate Myron, Kongthap Peak, Noppakao Dechaphatthanakun	
2025	Cetaphil	Presenter		
2025	MLB Spring-Summer 2025			
2025	Calbee Ebisen	Presenter		
2025	UNIQLO This is My Best "T" เสื้อยืดตัวโปรดจากยูนิโคล่		with Korranid Laosubinprasoet	
2025	Metropolitan Electricity Authority(MEA) : MEA e-Service แค่คลิกก็ครบ จบทุกเรื่องไฟฟ้า การไฟฟ้านครหลวงในมือคุณ	Presenter		
2025	UNIQLO Polo Collection มีสไตล์ได้ทุกวัน		with Korranid Laosubinprasoet	

== Awards and nominations ==
Year	Award ceremony	Category	Nominated work	Result	Ref.
2024	Nineentertain Awards 2024	Popular Vote	—N/a	Nominated	
2024	Maya TV Awards 2024	Male Rising Star of The Year	Duangjai Dhevaprom-Kwanruetai	Won	
2024	Maya TV Awards 2024	Couple of The Year (with Narilya Gulmongkolpech)	Duangjai Dhevaprom-Kwanruetai	Nominated	
2024	Maya TV Awards 2024	Popular Vote	Duangjai Dhevaprom-Kwanruetai	Nominated	
2024	Howe Awards 2024	Howe Shining Male Award	Duangjai Dhevaprom-Kwanruetai	Nominated	
2024	Howe Awards 2024	Howe The Best Couple Award (with Narilya Gulmongkolpech)	Duangjai Dhevaprom-Kwanruetai	Nominated	
2024	TikTok Awards 2024	Celebrity Creator of the Year	—N/a	Won	
2024	Dailynews Awards 2024	D-Rising Star	Duangjai Dhevaprom-Kwanruetai	Nominated	
2024	Dailynews Awards 2024	D-Superstar	—N/a	Nominated	
2024	GQ Men of the Year 2024	Breakthrough Actor of the Year	Duangjai Dhevaprom-Kwanruetai; The Sweetest Taboo	Won	
2025	Sanook Top of The Year 2024	Rising Star of the Year	—N/a	Nominated	
2025	Sanook Top of The Year 2024	Best Couples of the year (with Narilya Gulmongkolpech)	—N/a	Nominated	
2025	Zoomdara Awards 2025	Hottest Male Rising Star of the Year	Duangjai Dhevaprom-Kwanruetai	Won	
2025	SUPERSTAR IDOL AWARDS 2025	SUPERSTAR BEST ACTOR	The Sweetest Taboo	Won	
2025	The Viral Hits Awards 2024	Rising Star Actor/Actress of The Year	—N/a	Nominated	
2025	16th Nataraja Awards	Best Supporting Actor (Long form)	The Sweetest Taboo	Nominated	
2025	Nineentertain Awards 2025	Popular Vote	—N/a	Nominated	
2025	KAZZ AWARDS 2025	Num Wai Sai2024	—N/a	Nominated	
2025	KAZZ AWARDS 2025	The Best Actor of The Year	Duangjai Dhevaprom-Kwanruetai; The Sweetest Taboo	Won	
2025	Maya TV Awards 2025	Charming Male of The Year	—N/a	Nominated	
2025	ContentAsia Awards 2025	Best Male Lead in a TV Programme/Series Made in Asia	The Sweetest Taboo	Nominated	
2025	ContentAsia Awards 2025	Viewers’ Choice Awards (Fan Favorite Actor – Thailand)	The Sweetest Taboo	Won	
2025	FEED X KHAOSOD AWARDS 2025	Actor Spotlight of the Year	The Sweetest Taboo	Nominated	
2025	Howe Awards 2025	Howe Hottest Actor Award	—N/a	Nominated	
2025	Howe Awards 2025	Howe Rising Icon Award	—N/a	Won	

=== Honour ===
Year	Agency	Honour	Ref.
2024	The National Council on Social Welfare of Thailand under the Royal Patronage (NCSWT)	Award of Honour for a Child with Exceptional Gratitude and Filial Piety Toward Mother	
2025	Lampang Kanlayanee School Alumni Association	Distinguished Alumni of the Year 2025	
