= Classic Again =

- Directed by: Thachaphong Suphasri
- Based on: The Classic
- Starring: Ranchrawee Uakoolwarawat; Thitipoom Techaapaikhun; Sutthirak Subvijitra; Samitpong Sakulpongchai; Chonnikan Netjui
- Production company: CJ Major Entertainment
- Release date: February 6, 2020

Classic Again (Thai: จดหมาย สายฝน ร่มวิเศษ) is a 2020 Thai romantic drama directed by Thachaphong Suphasri and produced by CJ Major Entertainment. An official remake of the 2003 South Korean film The Classic, it stars Ranchrawee Uakoolwarawat, Thitipoom Techaapaikhun, Sutthirak Subvijitra, Samitpong Sakulpongchai, and Chonnikan Netjui. The story weaves together parallel romance narratives connecting a modern-day daughter to her mother's past through a collection of old love letters, and was released in Thailand on February 6, 2020.

== Plot ==
The film tells two parallel love stories set in different eras, experienced by a mother and her daughter. In the present day, Bota (Ranchrawee Uakoolwarawat) is a university student who secretly harbors feelings for Non (Sutthirak Subvijitra), a popular older student. However, she chooses to conceal her emotions because her close friend, Poppy (Chonnikan Netjui), is also infatuated with Non and frequently asks Bota to ghostwrite love letters and confession emails to him on her behalf.

One day, Bota discovers a hidden box containing old love letters and a diary belonging to her mother, Dalah (also played by Ranchrawee Uakoolwarawat), which chronicles her mother's first love in the late 1960s. The flashbacks reveal a romance between Dalah, a young woman from a wealthy background, and Kajorn (Thitipoom Techaapaikhun), a young man from a poor family. The two fall in love during a summer vacation in the countryside. However, their relationship faces deep socioeconomic barriers. Upon returning to the city, Kajorn discovers that his best friend, Thanil (Samitpong Sakulpongchai), is also in love with Dalah and has already been arranged by their families to marry her. To protect his friendship, Kajorn decides to suppress his feelings and sacrifice his love, ultimately leading to their heartbreak and separation as they go on to live separate lives.

As Bota reads through her mother's past, she realizes that her current love triangle and the painful necessity of hiding her feelings parallel her mother's past experiences. In the climax, Bota discovers a twist of fate: Non, the young man she loves, is actually the son of Kajorn—her mother's unforgettable first love. The unfulfilled love and rain-soaked memories of the mother's generation are eventually inherited, reconnected, and fulfilled by their children in the present day.

== Cast ==
Actor	Role	Character Description
Ranchrawee Uakoolwarawat	Dalah	A young upper-class woman in the late 1960s whose first love with Kajorn remains unforgettable.
Ranchrawee Uakoolwarawat	Bota	Dalah's daughter in the present day, a university student who discovers her mother's old love letters.
Thitipoom Techaapaikhun	Kajorn	A young man from a poor background in the past generation, and Dalah's first love.
Sutthirak Subvijitra	Non	A popular senior student at Bota's university whom she secretly admires.
Chonnikan Netjui	Poppy	Bota's bubbly best friend in the present day who also has a crush on Non.
Samitpong Sakulpongchai	Thanil	Kajorn's best friend in the past whose family arranged for him to marry Dalah.

== Production ==
=== Development ===
The film is an official Thai-language remake of the acclaimed 2003 South Korean romantic drama film The Classic, which was originally written and directed by Kwak Jae-yong. The project was produced by CJ Major Entertainment, a joint venture between South Korea's CJ E&M and Thailand's major cinema chain, Major Cineplex Group. The film marked the feature directorial debut of Thachaphong Suphasri, with M.R. Chalermchatri Yukol serving as the executive producer.

The screenplay was adapted to resonate with Thai cultural contexts. The timeline for the past generation (the mother's era) was set in 1967 (B.E. 2510), an era defined by prominent socioeconomic stratification in Thai society and the height of handwritten love letters, before transitioning to the modern university love triangle in the present day.

=== Filming ===
Principal photography took place primarily in Songkhla Province, located in southern Thailand. The production team selected the historic Songkhla Old Town and the Sadao District as the main filming locations to capture a nostalgic, vintage Thai atmosphere and natural landscapes suitable for the film's romantic tone. The entire filming and post-production process took approximately one year to complete prior to its official theatrical release.

== Release ==
=== Theatrical release ===
The film held its gala premiere on February 5, 2020, at Paragon Cineplex inside the Siam Paragon shopping mall, before officially opening in theaters nationwide on February 6, 2020.

During its opening weekend (February 6–9, 2020), the film grossed 1.80 million baht in Bangkok, its surrounding metropolitan areas, and Chiang Mai Province, with a total opening week gross of 1.95 million baht. By the end of its theatrical run, the film accumulated a total gross of 3.33 million baht, making it one of the top-grossing Thai films in the first half of 2020 despite facing the initial impacts of the COVID-19 pandemic on the cinema industry.

=== Streaming release ===
Following its theatrical run, CJ Major Entertainment released the film for online streaming on Netflix (Netflix Thailand). It became available on the platform on June 11, 2020, expanding its reach to home entertainment audiences.

== Marketing ==
=== Promotion and launch ===
CJ Major Entertainment officially commenced the promotional campaign for the film in January 2020, releasing the first teaser posters and official still images to capture the attention of both fans of the original South Korean film and newer generations. On January 9, 2020, an official press conference was held at the Infinicity Hall on the 5th floor of Siam Paragon, showcasing the main cast and director under the promotional theme "Opening the Box of First Love Memories." The official theatrical trailer was subsequently released on January 22, 2020, targeting audiences ahead of the Valentine's Day season.

=== Soundtrack ===
Music played a pivotal role in the film's marketing and narrative tone. The production team collaborated with prominent Thai artists to create a nostalgic soundtrack, featuring the following official releases:

- "Nueng Khwam Song Cham" (One Memory) – Performed by the pop band MEAN (under LOVEiS Entertainment). The song is a Thai-language adaptation of the original iconic theme song "Me to You, You to Me" (Korean: 너에게 난 나에게 넌) by Scenery of Riding Bicycle. The Thai lyrics were written by Surachai Pornphimanman, and the official music video was released on February 3, 2020, serving as the main promotional single.
- "Fak Rak" (Entrusting Love) – Performed by the synth-pop band POLYCAT. It is a modern rearrangement of a classic Thai pop track originally performed by The Innocent (composed by Chatree Kongsuwan). The song was reimagined in POLYCAT's signature 1980s synth-pop style to enhance the late 1960s retro atmosphere of the film. Its music video was released on Valentine's Day, February 14, 2020.
- "14cm." – Performed by POLYCAT. An original mid-tempo pop song written specifically for the film, the lyrics describe the physical distance and emotional closeness that sparks the beginning of first love. It was released as the project's introductory single on January 24, 2020, to generate buzz among younger listeners.
