= Ranchrawee Uakoolwarawat =

Thai actress

- รัญชน์รวี เอื้อกูลวราวัตร
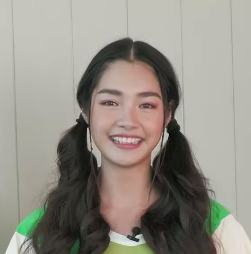
- Ranchrawee in 2023
- Born: Kiratika Uakoolwarawat; September 9, 1998 (age 27); Nakhon Ratchasima, Thailand
- Other names: Mint (มิ้นท์), Mint Ranchrawee, Mintranch
- Education: Ramkhamhaeng University
- Occupations: Actress; Model; Badminton player
- Years active: 2018–present
- Agent: Channel 3 (2018–present)
- Height: 175 cm (5 ft 9 in)

Ranchrawee Uakoolwarawat (Thai: รัญชน์รวี เอื้อกูลวราวัตร; born September 9, 1998), nicknamed Mint (Thai: มิ้นท์) is a Thai actress and model affiliated with Channel 3 HD, a former national youth badminton athlete. She is well-known for her role as Anda in the series Karn Game Ru and for portraying Duj Apsorn in the series Duangjai Thewaphrom: Duj Apsorn.

== History ==
Ranchrawee was born on September 9, 1998 in Nakhon Ratchasima province, she has a total of 3 siblings; Mint is the second daughter, with one older brother and one younger brother. She follows the Theravada Buddhist tradition. She completed her high school education at Suranaree Witthaya School and is currently pursuing a bachelor's degree at the Faculty of Human Resource Development, Ramkhamhaeng University, as well as Business Administration with a major in Marketing at Rangsit University. She also used to be a badminton athlete for Nakhon Ratchasima province, winning a silver medal at the National Youth Games, as well as securing a bronze medal at the National Sports Festival and receiving a royal trophy from Her Royal Highness Princess Maha Chakri Sirindhorn.

== Filmography ==
=== Television series ===
Year	Title	Role	Network	Notes
2018	Kharm See Tan Dorn 2018	Nara	Channel 3	
2019	Daai Daeng	Ling Ling	Channel 3	
2021	Praomook	Nampetch Wongnounnang (Petch)	Channel 3	
2021	Pruesapa Thunwa Ruk Tae Kae Kerd Korn	Minaraya Leidpongsathon (Mint)	Channel 3	
2022	Keu Ter	Claire	Channel 3	
2022	Suptar 2550	Luna	Channel 3	
2022	Lai Kinnaree	Lady Duangjan	Channel 3	
2023	Kon Game Rak	Anda Atsawathanon / Manantaya Atsawathanon (Mild)	Channel 3	
2024	Duangjai Dhevaprom : Dujapsorn	Dujapsorn Trinattee (Fah)	Channel 3	
2024	Duangjai Dhevaprom : Porncheewan	Dujapsorn Juthathep Na Ayudhya (Fah)	Channel 3	
2025	Muea Tawan Lap Fa Ko Ja Pen Wela Khong Duangdao	Napdao Patheepkamol (Dao)	Channel 3	
2026	Thot Than Thi Rak Ter		Channel 3	
2026	Duangchai Chao Oei		Channel 3	

=== Movies ===
Year	Title	Role	Notes	With
2020	Classic Again	Dalah	Main Role	Thitipoom Techaapaikhun
2024	China town Cha Cha	Ky / Jingjoo	Main Role	Teeradetch Metawarayut

=== Music video appearances ===
Year	Song title	Artist
2017	"กลิ่นหอม"	Thanachai Ujjin
2019	"กรรม"	Nakharin Kingsak
2021	"ดอกฟ้า"	Labanoon
2025	"แค่เธอยิ้ม (Super Smile)"	ETC.
2025	"What If"	Gemini

== Discography ==
=== Soundtrack appearances ===
Year	Song title	Sing along with	OST
2020	"มีรัก (Cover)"	-	Classic Again
2024	"อย่าปล่อยมือ (Duangjai Dhevaprom Sports Day)"	Kanawut Traipipattanapong; Yeena Salas; Panitan Budkaew; Narilya Gulmongkolpech; Eisaya Heosuwan; Tate Myron; Kongthap Peak; Noppakao Dechaphatthanakun; Punpreedee Khumprom Rodsaward	-
2024	"ฟ้า (I Wish You the Sky) (Peak x Mint version)"	Kongthap Peak	Duangjai Dhevaprom: Dujapsorn

== Awards and nominations ==
Year	Award	Category	Nominee	Result	Ref.
2025	KAZZ Awards	Most Popular Young Girl Award	Mint Ranchrawee	Won	
