= Duangjai Dhevaprom =

Thai television series

- Thai: ดวงใจเทวพรหม
- Literally: The Heart of Dhevaprom
- Genre: Romantic; Melodrama; Family; Historical
- Based on: Duangjai Dhevaprom
- Written by: Sornklin; Gaotam; Praenut; Nara; Romkaew
- Directed by: Thanakorn Posayananda; Yutthana Leopanpaiboon; Chatchai Plengpanich; Pawanrat Naksuriya; Songsak Mongkolthong; Somjing Srisuparp
- Starring: Yeena Salas; Kanawut Traipipattanapong; Narilya Gulmongkolpech; Panitan Budkaew; Eisaya Hosuwan; Tate Myron; Ranchrawee Uakoolwarawat; Kongthap Peak; Punpreedee Khumprom Rodsaward; Noppakao Dechaphatthanakun
- Country of origin: Thailand
- Original language: Thai
- No. of seasons: 1
- No. of episodes: Laorchan : 15; Kwanruetai : 14; Jaiphisut : 17; Dujapsorn : 15; Porncheewan : 16

Production
- Executive producers: Eknaree Wachirabunjong; Thitima Sangkapitak; Chatchai Plengpanich; Sinjai Plengpanich; Yossinee Na Nakorn; Somjing Srisuparp
- Production companies: Do Entertainment; No Problem; Metta and Mahaniyom; Maker Y; GOOD Feeling

Original release
- Network: Channel 3
- Release: 8 March 2024 – August 31, 2024

Related
- Suphapburut Juthathep

Duangjai Dhevaprom (Thai: ดวงใจเทวพรหม, lit. 'The Heart of Dhevaprom', RTGS: Duangjai Thewaphrom) is a Thai lakorn broadcast on Channel 3, premiering the first drama on 8 March 2024. It finished the process of filming in 2023. It is the sequel of Suphapburut Juthathep series, airing in 2013. The series was based on a set of novels of the same name, which were written by the same writers as its preceding story. Duangjai Dhevaprom consists of Laorchan, Kwanruetai, Jaiphisut, Dujapsorn and Porncheewan.

== History ==
In 2015, the publisher and the writers of its novels announced to write a sequel to Suphapburut Juthathep, due to the overwhelming success of its TV series in 2013. The writers would write the sequel of their preceding stories — Nara writes Dujapsorn, Romkaew writes Porncheewan, Gaotam writes Kwanruetai, Sornklin writes Laorchan, and Praenut writes Jaiphisut. The story is mainly about the life of Devaphrom's heirs, so the titles of the novels use the female lead characters' names.

In 2020, Channel 3 confirmed that Duangjai Dhevaprom was in the process of being made into a television series and was using the same titles as the novels. Also, it would be produced by the same companies with mostly the same directors as Suphapburut Juthathep, except for Laorchan which produced by its affiliated company. Later, it was reported that the series had cast the main roles. At the time, it was predicted that the new cast would portray the main characters, but it did not have any confirmation from either Channel 3 or the production team.

Until 2022, Channel 3 held the official opening event of the series, "Duangjai Dhevaprom Debut Night", at River Park, Iconsiam on March 23. The event was held for both the celebration of Channel 3's 52nd anniversary and the revealing of the series' main cast.

In March 2024, BEC World launched sales of perfumes under the brand name C3 — "SCENT OF DHEVAPROM Perfume Collection" — there are 5 scents which are unique according to each drama.

In the same month, Channel 3 held a special event, "Duangjai Dhevaprom Sports Day" at Union Mall. They are divided into 5 color teams, Laorchan as the yellow team, Kwanruetai as the green team, Jaiphisut as the orange team, Dujapsorn as the red team, and Porncheewan as the blue team. Gathering many actors from the dramas total of 40 actors, together with the fans around 3,000 seats.

On August 25, Channel 3 will hold "Dhevaprom Fan Con After Party" at Siam Paragon which the tickets available on July 21, 2024.

== Family trees ==
=== Dhevaprom family ===
Dhevaprom family tree

Chao Sriwilai; Bhukhamwong	Chao Feuangpetch; Bhukhamwong	M.C.Jakkrarin; Dhevaprom	Mom Ploy; Dhevaprom	M.C.Jaithip; Dhevaprom	Sakchai Waiyatawee
Unknown	Chao Peeraphong; Bhukhamwong	M.R.Taewapan; Dhevaprom	Prapai; Dhevaprom	Maj.Gen., M.R.Anupan; Dhevaprom	M.R.Daraneenuch; Dhevaprom	M.R.Worapan; Dhevaprom	Unknown	Unknown	Unknown
Audrey Roufier	Chao Weerawong; Bhukhamwong	M.L.Kedsara; Dhevaprom	Chinnakorn	M.L.Marathee; Dhevaprom	Sir Pinij	M.L.Wilairampha; Dhevaprom	Siriphong	M.L.Sineenuch; Dhevaprom	General; Saksit	M.L.Kratin; Dhevaprom	Luechai; Wongnakorn	Kamlai Waiyatawee	Dr. Direk
Chao Laorchan; Bhukhamwong	Chavit	Chalisa	Porncheewa	Kwanruetai	Dujapsorn	Woranuch; Aeknawin	Cheewan; Wongnakorn	Jaiphisut

Reference :

=== Juthathep family ===
Juthathep family tree

M.R.Taratorn; Juthathep		M.L.Raweeramphai; Juthathep	M.R.Pawornruj; Juthathep		Wanrasa; Juthathep Na Ayudhya	M.R.Puttipat; Juthathep, M.D.		Krongkaew; Juthathep Na Ayudhya	M.R.Rachanon; Juthathep		Soifah; Juthathep Na Ayudhya	Air Chf. Mshl., M.R.Ronapee; Juthathep		Piangkwan; Juthathep Na Ayudhya
	Maj., M.L.Asira; Juthathep	M.L.Anistha; Juthathep		M.L.Saruj; Juthathep			Maj., M.L.Chatklao; Juthathep, M.D.	M.L.Pokkate; Juthathep		M.L.Phuthanate; Juthathep	M.L.Kanthika; Juthathep	Pol. Capt., M.L.Ronnajak; Juthathep (Note: Ronnajak's rank in novel is Captain (armed forces) abbreviated as Capt.)	Flg. Off., M.L.Ronnaphoom; Juthathep		M.L.Ronnaret; Juthathep	M.L.Ronnakorn; Juthathep

Reference :

M.R.Taratorn, M.R.Pawornruj, M.R.Puttipat, M.R.Rachanon and M.R.Ronapee are considered as the 3rd generation of Juthathep family and they are called as 5 Singhs of Juthathep (Note: Thai: 5 สิงห์แห่งจุฑาเทพ, lit. '5 Lions of Juthathep', RTGS: Hah Singh Hang Juthathep) So in the 4th generation, the first child of the 3rd generation all are males, they are called as Second Generation of 5 Singh of Juthathep.

== Laorchan ==
Laorchan (Note: Thai: ลออจันทร์, lit. 'Beautiful moon', RTGS: La-or Jan) is the first drama of the series, based on a novel series of the same name. Its novel is written by Sornklin and is the sequel of Khun Chai Rachanon. The drama is produced by Do Entertainment Co., Ltd. The producer and director are Aeknaree Wachirabunjong and Thanakorn Posayanont, respectively.

=== Plot ===
Laorchan, a girl who conceals her true identity to apply for work as a secretary of M.L. Phuthanate Juthathep at JT Center, the department store which belongs to the Juthathep family. She intends to steal Atchanajakkara or The Third Eye Sapphire, the mysterious sapphire necklace of the Bhukhamwong royal, for the sake of proving the innocence of her family.

A necklace full of dark mystery becomes a noose that ties their hearts together. They have to cooperate with one another to find the truth and overcome the danger that could shake the throne of Viangbhukham. Moreover, the both are finding their true feelings with the help of the people around.

=== Cast ===
==== Main ====
- Yeena Salas as Laorchan Pantaewa / Chao Laorchan Bhukhamwong / Chao Fueangphet (Note: Thai: เจ้า, romanized: Chao, RTGS: Prince or Princess)

A princess of the Bhukhamwong royal family in Viangbhukham, who is brave and confident. She flew from Paris to Thailand for stealing the Atchanajakkra necklace that can prove the innocence of her family, which will be displayed at the JT Center department store. So, she has to cover herself as a commoner with the help of Suliya.

- Kanawut Traipipattanapong as M.L. Phuthanate Juthathep / Khun Phu

The eldest son of M.R.Rachanon and Soifah Juthathep Na Ayudhya, and he has a sister named M.L. Kanthika. He is Chao Satarasami's best friend, with whom he grew up. He is the managing director and CEO of JT Development and JT Center. He is a perfectionist and good at management; therefore, he is ordered to prepare an exhibition of the necklace.

- Paswitch Boorananut as Chao Satarasami Bhukhamwong

Tall and elegant prince of Viangbhukham, with sharp eyes like King Rangsiman, and has a warm smile like Queen Chandra. He is charming and mature beyond his years because he has to carry the burden of responsibility on his shoulders. He is a strong heir to the throne, a warrior, a negotiator, an observer, and a strategist. He is Phuthanate's best friend with whom he can talk about everything.

- Denise Jelilcha Kapaun as Veena / Capt. Veena Mahannop

Veena has a beautiful face, white skin, well-proportioned, and looks stronger than a normal person. She came to help and tried to be close to Laorchan for some reason.

- Thatchathon Sabanan as Maj. Wachira Wongsawan

The son of FM Chumpol and Khun Ying Praphasri. Has dark skin and a sharp face. Being a skilled warrior and fierce on the battlefield as a commander of the royal guard protecting Chao Satarasami. While in the love field, he turns out to be a very tame little cat.

- Kornnaphat Sethratanapong as M.L. Kanthika Juthathep / Khun Kan

She is described as having a beautiful face like her mother, and being a modern one. She holds a master's degree in management from England. As a planner, she is the one who creates the perfect situations and great pairings, especially the pair of Phuthanate and Laorchan. She may be friendly to others, but with her fiancé, she becomes secretly fierce.

- Tadsapon Wiwitawan as Suliya / Sun

Laorchan's only friend since attended college in Paris. He came close to Laorchan for a secret mission and helped her to approach to Atchanajakkara necklace. However, he secretly develops a good feeling toward her and cares for her sincerely.

==== Supporting ====
===== Dhevaprom =====
- Chonnikarn Supittayaporn as Woranuch Aeknawin

She is the only daughter of Sineenuch. She was spoiled by her mother, became a snobby and self-willed person.

- Chotiros Kaewpinit as Khun Ying Sineenuch Aeknawin

She has inherited Dhevaprom blood from her father. She was spoiled from a young age, and that was the same way she raised her child.

- Dilok Thongwattana as M.R. Taewapan Dhevaprom

The head of the Dhevaprom family is at the final stage of his life alone. Although his oldest daughter, Kedsara, usually visits him, he still misses his two missing daughters.

===== Juthathep =====
- Dom Hetrakul as M.R. Rachanon Juthathep, father of Phuthanate and Kanthika
- Ramavadee Nakchudtree as Soifah Juthathep Na Ayudhya, mother of Phuthanate and Kanthika
- Kongthap Peak as Maj., M.L. Asira Juthathep / Khun Phet

The oldest son of M.R. Taratorn and M.L. Raweeramphai Juthathep, the eldest among the 4th generation of the family, and a brother of M.L. Anistha Juthathep. He is calm and brave as the military special force army.

- Noppakao Dechaphatthanakun as M.L. Saruj Juthathep / Khun Saruj

The second of Juthathap's 4th generation and the only son of M.R. Pawornruj and Rasa Juthathep Na Ayudhya. Now, he is the second secretary of the Embassy of Thailand in Washington, D.C., United States. He is calm and loves to serve his siblings as a father.

- Panitan Budkaew as Maj., M.L. Chatklao Juthathep, M.D. / Khun Chat

The only son of M.R. Puttipat and Krongkaew and the brother of M.L. Pokkate. He is an Orthopedic surgeon who graduated from Phramongkutklao College of Medicine, the medical cadet school. After graduation, he chose to work at the Fort Hospital near the country border in Chiang Rai province.

- Tate Myron as Pol. Capt., M.L. Ronnajak Juthathep / Khun Jak

The oldest son of M.R. Ronapee and Piangkwan, the eldest among four siblings. He is a police officer working at the Narcotics Suppression Bureau (NSB). He is elegant, as he used to be a model, and hilarious like his father.

- Suppapong Udomkaewkanjana as Plt. Off., M.L. Ronnaphoom Juthathep / Khun Phoom

The second son of M.R. Ronapee and Piangkwan, the younger brother of M.L. Ronnajak. He is the Royal Thai Air Force fighter pilot of F-16 in the 1st Airborne, Nakhon Ratchasima. He is a playful person like his brother and father, and has a special sense of future events.

- Duangta Tungkamani as Oon / Khun Tuad Oon (Note: Thai: ทวด, romanized: Tuad, RTGS: Great-grandmother)

The younger sister of Mom Aiet, the grandmother of 5 M.R.s and the great-grandmother of the M.L.s. Currently, she is in her 90s.

===== Viangbhukham =====
- Worachon Kaewjinda as Sgt. Maj. Phadthana, one of the 3 leaders of the royal guard who protected Chao Satarasami, together with Wachira and Khampeng.
- Narawit Chitbanchong as 2nd Lt. Khampeng, one of the 3 leaders of the royal guard who protected Chao Satarasami, together with Wachira and Phadthana.
- Nithi Smuthkochon as Chao Luang Rangsiman Bhukhamwong, (Note: Thai: เจ้าหลวง, romanized: Chao Luang, RTGS: King) the king reigning of Viangbhukham and a father of Chao Satarasami.
- Ansana Buranunt as Chao Nang Chandra Bhukhamwong, (Note: Thai: เจ้านาง, romanized: Chao Nang, RTGS: Queen) the queen of Chao Luang Rangsiman and a mother of Chao Satarasami.
- Chirakit Suwannapaph as Chao Anucha Bhukhamwong, a high-ranking military officer and also a member of the Viangbhukham royal family.
- Phutharit Prombandal as Field marshal Chumpol Wongsawan / Joi, a father of Wachira, a commander-in-chief of the Viangbhukham military, and also a commander of the royal guard protecting Chao Luang Rangsiman.
- Thanapat Sornkoon as Ling
- Trinnaya Morson as Salika, Bhukhamwong Royal Museum's employee

===== Others =====
- Ratawan Omthaisong as Nhu See, (Note: Nhoo/Nhu is used for calling someone affectionately or a young girl) a girl in the countryside of Viangbhukham who helps Laorchan and the team in finding the place of Lord Phaya Trinet.
- Orn-arnich Peerachakajornpat as Nujaree, M.L. Phuthanate's secretary

==== Cameo ====
- Natthawut Skidjai as M.R. Taratorn Juthathep / Khun Chai Yai
- Premsinee Ratanasopha as M.L. Raweeramphai Juthathep / Khun Maprang
- Sarut Vichitrananda as M.R. Pawornruj Juthathep / Khun Chai Ruj
- Sarocha Watittapan as Wanrasa Juthathep Na Ayudhya / Rasa
- Penpetch Benyakul as M.R. Puttipat Juthathep, M.D. / Khun Chai Pat
- Rinlanee Sripen as Krongkaew Juthathep Na Ayudhya / Kaew
- Phol Tantasathien as ACM, M.R. Ronapee Juthathep / Khun Chai Pee
- Sinjai Plengpanich as Piangkwan Juthathep Na Ayudhya / Kwan

The wife of M.R. Ronapee and the mother of Ronnajak, Ronnaphoom, Ronnaret, and Ronnakorn. She is still a legend in the film industry.

- Mayurin Pongpudpunth as M.L. Kedsara Vanichmankong / Khun Ked, mother of Chavit and the oldest daughter of Taewapan
- Apinan Prasertwattanakul as Chinnakorn Vanichmankong, father of Chavit and the owner of one of the biggest gold shop in Thailand
- Chayanit Chayjaroen as M.L. Anistha Juthathep / Khun Ploy, a sister of Asira and only daughter of M.R. Taratorn with M.L. Raweeramphai
- Nichakoon Khajornborirak as Chavit Vanichmankong / Vit, the CEO of the family's gold shop and Asira's best friend
- Unruen Rachot as Jaew, Oon personal servant
- Danai Charuchinta as Chao Luang Atittayawong, a former reigner of Viangbhukham
- Chanatip Potongkam as Chao Sriwilai Bhukhamwong, a brother of Chao Luang Atittayawong
- Chalad Na Songkhla as Sudsadakorn
- Thakrit Tawanpong as Lord Phaya Trinet (Note: A human version of serpent in the myth of Viangbhukham and was believed to be the owner of the sapphire in the Atchanajakkara necklace. The information mainly refers to the novel.)
- Tarika Insuwan as Ua-Kham
- Kummun Klomkeaw as Chao Chang Phueak
- Paradee Vongsawad as Audrey Roufeier
- Kamonrat Areesanun as Mom Ploy Dhevaprom, a wife of M.C. Jakkarin
- Dylan Bryant as Warat Seththaseni, a Saruj's diplomat friend.
- Chanida Chomchalao as child Laorchan

== Kwanruetai ==
Kwanruetai (Note: Thai: ขวัญฤทัย, romanized: Kwanruetai, RTGS: The girl who is beloved) is the second drama of the series, based on a novel series of the same name. Its novel is written by Gaotam, who also wrote their parents' story, Khun Chai Puttipat. The drama is produced by No Problem Co., Ltd. The producer and director is Thitima Sangkapitak and Yutthana Leopanpaiboon, respectively.

=== Plot ===
Maj., M.L.Chatklao Juthathep, M.D., a smart military doctor who works in Chiang Rai province's border, meets Kwanruetai, the young food vendor who is brave and tough. Chatklao's polite and gentle personality makes the girl misunderstand that he is gay. They both always argue and fight with each other, but suddenly there is a reason that they turn to be cooperative in helping break down drug production sites in the area.

They have a good feeling for one another, but the past of their parents separates them. Their paths seemed to be parallel, but only the power of true love can lead them to listen to the voice of their hearts.

=== Cast ===
==== Main ====
- Panitan Budkaew as Maj., M.L. Chatklao Juthathep, M.D. / Khun Chat

The only son of M.R. Puttipat and Krongkaew and the brother of M.L. Pokkate. He is an Orthopedic surgeon who graduated from Phramongkutklao College of Medicine, the medical cadet school. After graduation, he chose to work at the Fort Hospital near the country border in Chiang Rai province, where he met Kwanruetai.

- Narilya Gulmongkolpech as Kwanruetai Pithaktheva / Tai

A courageous, tough, and bright girl who lives in Chiang Rai. She has a stepbrother and a late stepfather, who treated her as family. She never knows that her mother is M.L. Marathee Dhevaprom, as well as her biological father.

- Kajbandit Jaidee as Phakrat Thanasak / Phak

The third child of Sir Phinij and Khun Ying Amphai. Has thick eyebrows, good looks, and is hidebound. He is a close friend of Chatklao. He graduated with a master's degree in management from the United States and recently returned to take care of family business as the president of PG Engineer. He has two older brothers and a half-sister who is Kwanruethai. He usually argues with Pokkate over different attitudes, but is deeply interested in her.

- Saralee Prasitdumrong as M.L. Pokkate Jutathep / Khun Kate

Has just returned to Thailand after graduating from France in fashion design. She is a beautiful and being modern girl. Has high self-confidence, being a fashionista, but is often scolded by Chatklao about the way she dresses. She dreams of having her own clothes shop, so she decides to study business at the country's famous clothes shop named Arada.

- Sakaojai Poolsawad as M.L. Manee Pithakthewa / M.L.Marathee Dhevaprom

The mother of Kwanruetai, who used to be a high-class person. Therefore, remains arrogantly proud of her own dignity and always blames Juthathep and her daughter for making her life miserable.

==== Supporting ====
===== People around Kwanruetai =====
- Wattikorn Permsubhirun as Kongphop Pithaktheva

An only child of Kawee and a stepbrother of Kwanruetai. He is warm and always helps Kwanruetai when the time she needs.

- Kasidis Kritphitthayawet as Mai Seek, Kwanruetai's friend
- Intouch Techakoetkamol as Samlee, Kwanruetai's friend

===== People at hospital =====
- Unnop Thongborisut as Maj. Poramet, M.D. / Met

Chatklao's friend since the college years, and also a doctor at the same hospital as him in Chiang Rai. He is a hilarious and warm-hearted person who has a love interest in Namfon.

- Marilyn Kate Gardner as Namfon, a nurse at the hospital where Chatklao works in Chiang Rai
- Sutthatip Wouthichaipradit as Panada, a nurse at the hospital where Chatklao works in Chiang Rai

===== People around Pokkate =====
- Rachanee Siralert as Arada, the famous clothes shop owner
- Passakorn Kruasopon as Atthawit, an only son of Arada
- Natthira Jivaramonaigul as Philai, an accounting employee of Arada's shop

===== Others =====
- Natasha Chulanond as Menie Pornsawan / Mali, an only child of Thek
- Supachai Suwanon as Sornram Aitthiasawawong, an only child of Songphol and Sunan
- Supoj Janjareon as Songphol Aitthiasawawong, the authoritative individual in Chiang Rai
- Khakkingrak Wingomin as Sunan Aitthiasawawong, the wife of Songphol
- Kittitat Pradab as Sakchai
- Seadthawut Porntanawut as Somchai

==== Cameo ====
- Penpeth Penkul as M.R. Puttipat Jutathep, M.D. / Khun Chai Pat
- Rinlanee Sripen as Krongkaew Jutathep Na Ayudhya / Kaew
- Yeena Salas as Chao Laorchan Bhukhamwong / Laor
- Kanawut Traipipattanapong as M.L. Phuthanate Juthathep / Khun Phu

The eldest son of M.R. Rachanon and Soifah and older brother of Kanthika. He is the managing director and CEO of JT Development and JT Center. He is a perfectionist and good at management.

- Kongthap Peak as Maj., M.L. Asira Juthathep / Khun Phet

The oldest son of M.R. Taratorn and M.L. Raweeramphai Juthathep, the eldest among the 4th generation of the family, and the older brother of Anistha. He is calm and brave as a member of the military special force.

- Noppakao Dechaphatthanakun as M.L. Saruj Juthathep / Khun Saruj

The second of Juthathap's 4th generation and the only son of M.R. Pawornruj and Wanrasa. Now, he is the second secretary of the Embassy of Thailand in Washington, D.C., United States. He is calm and loves to serve his siblings as his father.

- Tate Myron as Pol. Capt., M.L. Ronnajak Juthathep / Khun Jak

The oldest son of M.R. Ronapee and Piangkwan, the eldest among four siblings. He is a police officer working at the Narcotics Suppression Bureau (NSB). He is elegant, as he used to be a model, and hilarious like his father. He also investigates a head of drug dealers that associated with the case in Chiang Rai.

- Suppapong Udomkaewkanjana as Plt. Off., M.L. Ronnaphoom Juthathep / Khun Phoom

The second son of M.R. Ronapee and Piangkwan and the younger brother of Ronnajak. He is the Royal Thai Air Force fighter pilot of F-16 in the 1st Airborne, Nakhon Ratchasima. He is a playful person, as same as his brother and father and has a special sense of future events.

- Duangta Tungkamani as Tuad Oon

The younger sister of Mom Aiet, the grandmother of 5 M.R.s and the great-grandmother of the M.L.s. Currently, she is in her 90s.

- Dilok Thongwattana as M.R. Taewapan Dhevaprom, Manee's father, who is not feeling well due to poor health and is grieving.
- Sukol Sasijulaka as Kawee Pithaktheva, Kongphop's father and Kwanruetai's stepfather
- Ekkaphong Jongkesakorn as Phakphum Thanasak, Phakrat's oldest brother
- Pawish Wiengnon as Phakphiphat Thanasak, Phakrat's second oldest brother
- Techin Pinchatree as Khewin
- Piya Vimuktayon as Zhang Chen
- Narissan Lokavit as Prode
- Wichai Jongprasitporn as Thek, a village headman
- Kaliya Niehuns as Rungrawi, a model representing Arada's shop
- Waranya Waewsawat as Somsri
- Nuttanee Sittisamarn as Mian
- Wasan Padthong as The uncle
- Naruemon Phongsuphap as Amphai, Phakrat's mother
- Woraprot Chaem as Pol. Supt. Pichai
- King Konbai as hunter Porn
- Vichayut Supaporn as Pol. Capt. Chitkhet
- Narumol Nilawan as Lamai
- Watcharachai Sundarasiri as hunter Bhunsong / Bhun
- Khunkanich Koomkrong as Maen
- Kamonrat Areesanan as Orawan / Wan, Arada's oldest child
- Yanawee Smakkamai as Orawi / Orn, Arada's youngest child
- Nipawan Taveepornsawan as Waew
- Jirayu Tangsrisuk as young M.R.Puttipat Juthathep, M.D. / Khun Chai Pat
- Chotika Wongwilas as young M.L.Marathee Dhevaprom

== Jaiphisut ==
Jaiphisut (Note: Thai: ใจพิสุทธิ์, romanized: Jaiphisut, RTGS: Pure heart) is the third drama of the series, based on a novel series of the same name. Its novel is written by Praenut and is the sequel of Khun Chai Ronapee. The drama is produced by Metta and Mahaniyom Co., Ltd. Chatchai Plengpanich is the producer and is also the director together with Pawanrat Naksuriya.

=== Plot ===
Suddenly, Pol. Capt. M.L. Ronnajak Juthathep (Note: In the novel, Ronnajak is the royal cavalry under 29th Cavalry Squadron King's Guard with the rank Captain) has to adopt Somjeed, the naughty younger sister of his best friend after he died. The only one who can help him is 'Mhoo Pook', the former crying girl whom he usually teased in the past. The girl become Jaiphisut, the class teacher of Somjeed, who is more beautiful than before.

Even though she has a suspicious birth origin which may be detrimental to the Juthathep family, he does not afraid. Also, looking for any ways to win her heart and make his first love eternal.

=== Cast ===
==== Main ====
- Eisaya Hosuwan as Jaiphisut / Nhoo Pook / Kru Jaiphisut (Note: Thai: ครู, romanized: Kru, RTGS: Teacher) / Mhoo Pook (Note: Mhoo is used for calling someone chubby or fat, usually is considered as a rude word) (childhood)
  - Patcharanun Jutharattanakul as child Jaiphisut

A teacher at the elementary school where Somjeed, Papang, and Plawarn attended. She is a kind and grateful teacher; therefore, she is the students' favorite. Jaiphisut used to play with M.L. Ronnajak and M.L. Phuthanet in their childhood. She was chubby back then, so now they meet up again, Ronnajak can not recognize her. She later finds out that she inherited Dhevaprom's blood.

- Tate Myron as Pol. Capt., M.L. Ronnajak Juthathep / Khun Jak
  - Win Sakulsaengprapha as child M.L. Ronnajak

The oldest son of M.R. Ronapee and Piangkwan, the eldest among four siblings. He is a police officer working at the Narcotics Suppression Bureau (NSB). He is elegant, as he used to be a model, and hilarious like his father.

- Thuchapon Koowongbundit as Kru Jack

A physical education teacher at the same school as Jaiphisut. He is warmhearted and positive-thinking person. He secretly crushes on her but is not brave enough to confess. So, he always stays on her side and be a good advisor for her.

- Sirilak Kwong as Anthika / Anny

She is a bright, confident and thoughtful person. An only child of Rhodsukont who forces her to attract Roonajak's attention and make herself become Juthathep-in-law.

- Natrika Thampridanan as Kamlai Waiyatawee / Lai, a female living near Songpattanasuksa school who is secretly helps and takes care of Jaiphisut.
- Supawadee Khanti as Somjeed

An only sister of Singh. After her brother died, she has to move in living with Ronnajak's family and adapts to the new surrounding with the help of Jaiphisut. Later, Ronapeee and Piangkwan register her as an adopted child.

- Theetawat Kantasari as Papang, Somjeed's friend from Chiang Rai who accompanying her to Bangkok.

==== Supporting ====
===== Juthathep =====
- Phol Tantasathien as ACM, M.R. Ronapee Juthathep
  - James Ma as young M.R. Ronapee Juthathep

The commanders-in-chief of the Royal Thai Air Force. He is the head of the family who is tough while working, but soft while being with family.

- Sinjai Plengpanich as Piangkwan Juthathep Na Ayudhya
  - Chalida Vijitvongthong as young Piangkwan Juthathep Na Ayudhya

The wife of M.R. Ronapee and the mother of Ronnajak, Ronnaphoom, Ronnaret and Ronnakorn. She still continues working in the film industry.

- Suppapong Udomkaewkanjana as Plt. Off., M.L. Ronnaphoom Juthathep / Khun Phoom

The second son of M.R. Ronapee and Piangkwan, the younger brother of Ronnajak. He is the Royal Thai Air Force fighter pilot of F-16 in the 1st Airborne, Nakhon Ratchasima. He is a playful person like his brother and father, and he has the sixth sense of future events.

- Duangta Tungkamani as Oon / Khun Tuad Oon

The younger sister of Mom Aiet, the grandmother of 5 M.R.s and the great-grandmother of the M.L.s. Currently, she is in her 90s.

- Kongthap Peak as Maj., M.L. Asira Juthathep / Khun Phet

The oldest son of M.R. Taratorn and M.L. Raweeramphai Juthathep, the oldest among the 4th generation of the family and the older brother of Anistha. He is calm and brave as being the military special force.

- Noppakao Dechaphatthanakun as M.L. Saruj Juthathep / Khun Saruj

The second of Juthathep's 4th generation and the only son of M.R. Pawornruj and Wanrasa. Now, he is the second secretary of the Embassy of Thailand in Washington, D.C., United States. He is calm and loves to serve siblings as his father.

- Panitan Budkaew as Maj., M.L. Chatklao Juthathep, M.D. / Khun Chat

The only son of M.R. Puttipat and Krongkaew and the brother of Pokkate. He is an Orthopedic surgeon. He is working at the Fort Hospital near the country border in Chiang Rai province.

- Kanawut Traipipattanapong as M.L. Phuthanate Juthathep / Khun Phu
  - Natthapas Laohatienpratan as child M.L. Phuthanate
- Esther Supreeleela as young M.L. Wilairampha Dhevaprom

The eldest son of M.R. Rachanon and Soifah and the older brother of Kanthika. He is the managing director and CEO of JT Development and JT Center. He is a perfectionist and good at management.

- Saralee Prasitdamrong as M.L. Pokkate Juthathep, Jaiphisut's close friend since childhood
- Unruen Rachot as Jaew, Oon personal servant

===== People at school =====
- Thankorn Kanlayawuttiphong as Premmanatch / Plawan, Somjeed's classmate and rivalry
- Amarin Nitibhon as Prakarn, father of Premmanatch
- Natha Lloyd as Songsamorn, the owner of Songpattanasuksa school
- Nisha Rodanant as Phatcharaporn / Nhoo Noi, (Note: Thai: น้อย, romanized: Noi, RTGS: Small or young) the youngest daughter of Songsamorn and a teacher at her mother's school
- Tanapol Pheechaphat as Pruk / Nhoo Yai, (Note: Thai: ใหญ่, romanized: Yai, RTGS: Big or Great) the oldest child of Songsamorn.

He is addicted with gambling and think that his mother loves Jaiphisut more than him.

- Sannuch Jariyasart as Kru Arkom, a music teacher

===== Police =====
- Tatphong Phongsatat as Pol. Maj. Gen. Korbkiet, the commander of Ronnajak's working division
- Surinthon Karawoot as Pol. Maj. Phol, Ronnajak's senior
- Thawatchai Kacha-anant as Po;. Sgt. Maj. Somchai, Ronnajak's teammate
- Suparat Meeprecha as Pol. Col. Komkritch, the deputy commander of Ronnajak's working division

===== Others =====
- Dilok Thongwattana as M.R. Taewapan Dhevaprom
- Daran Thitakawin as Rhodsukont, mother of Anthika. She looks fierce and manages her daughter's life.
- Jirawat Wachirasarunphat as Jiew, the head of drug dealers and gambling den owners
- Duangjai Hataikarn as Grandmother Nuan, grandmother of Jack
- Lerwit Sangsit as Ma, a drug dealer
- Phatchanok Aiamsaart as Kamala
- Mashida Sutthikulpanich as Kritaya / Jum
- Sarinya Aiamsaart as Kaimook

==== Cameo ====
- Narilya Gulmongkolpech as Kwanruetai Pithaktheva / Kwan

The brave and naughty girl who is Chatklao's fiancée. She is the daughter of M.L.Marathee and Sir Pinij. She is studying nursing course and takes care her grandfather at Dhevaprom palace, on behalf of her mother.

- Natthawut Skidjai as M.R. Taratorn Juthathep / Khun Chai Yai
- Sarut Vichitrananda as M.R. Pawornruj Juthathep / Khun Chai Ruj
- Penpetch Benyakul as M.R. Puttipat Juthathep, M.D. / Khun Chai Pat
- Dom Hetrakul as M.R. Rachanon Juthathep, father of Phuthanate and Kanthika
- Pawanrat Naksuriya as Suay, a grocery seller nearby Jack's house
- Chatchai Plengpanich as Direk Waiyatawee, M.D.
- Porameth Noi-am as Phisut, M.D., Jaiphisut's stepfather
- Noraphat Thitakawin as Singh Sawangpian, Somjeed's older brother
- Jatuporn Wanitworaphong as Big Silom
- Nattaphol Thamsuto as Justin, Chiang Rai local people
- Tuangtip Na Nakorn as Barawee / Bee, Premmanatch's mother

== Dujapsorn ==
Dujapsorn (Note: Thai: ดุจอัปสร, romanized: Dujapsorn, RTGS: Like an angel) is the fourth drama of the series, based on a novel series of the same name. Its novel is written by Nara and is the sequel of Khun Chai Taratorn. The drama is produced by Maker Y Co., Ltd. The producer is Yossinee Na Nakorn and the director is Songsak Mongkolthong.

=== Plot ===
Dujapsorn determines to take revenge on behalf of her mother, M.L. Wilairampa Dhevaprom, she then applies for a job at JT Property as a PR, finding the way closer to M.R. Ronapee's offsprings. Unfortunately, she falls in love with M.L. Asira Juthathep, but he is not the right one that her mother wanted.

On the other hand, they used to meet one another once in the past and he has waited to meet her again for 2 years. Eventually, he meets her again but the love of the couple has her mother's hatred as a barrier combine with the truth that Dujapsorn never know.

=== Cast ===
==== Main ====
- Ranchrawee Uakoolwarawat as Dujapsorn Trinattee / Fah

The daughter of M.L. Wilairampha, the former arranged partner of M.R. Ronapee. She covers her true identity and applies for work as a PR of JT Property, for taking the revenge to M.R.Ronapee's heirs following the order of her mother. So, she always looks sad and tend to has many secrets that resulted from her mother.

- Kongthap Peak as M.L. Asira Juthathep / Khun Phet

The oldest son of M.R. Taratorn and M.L. Raweerampai Juthathep, the eldest among the 4th generation of the family. He is calm, bold and scrupulous as the eldest. He used to be the soldier in the special unit but later quit to became CEO of JT Property, after Black May incident, due to his father's retirement.

- Chayanit Chayjaroen as M.L. Anistha Juthathep / Khun ploy

The COO of JT Property. Graduated with a master's degree in accounting from England, was assigned to manage property's finance. She is confident, decisive, and serious about work, not interested in love, and also hates flirtatious men and arranged marriages.

- Nichakoon Khajornborirak as Chavit Vanichmankong / Vit

The eldest son of Kedsara and Chinnakorn. He is a close friend of Asira. He graduated with a master's degree from abroad and returned to help his father as CEO of the family's gold shop. He is a young energetic businessman who is successful in this era, single, wealthy, and looks like a playboy. Chavit has a crush on Anistha since young, but would like to seriously continue with her after grow up. At the same time, he also has a high older brother distinct and responsibility to protect and take care of his younger siblings and family.

- Suppapong Udomkaewkanjana as Flg. Off., M.L. Ronnaphoom Juthathep / Khun Phoom

The second son of M.R. Ronapee and Piangkwan, the younger brother of M.L. Ronnajak. He is the Royal Thai Air Force fighter pilot of F-16 in the 1st Airborne, Nakhon Ratchasima. He is a playful person like his brother and father, and has the special sense of the future event. He attempts to be familiar with Dujapsorn because he feels there is something involving her.

- Sirium Pukdeedumrongrit as Wipa / M.L. Wilairampa Trinattee

The mother of Dujapsorn. She has a mental disorder due to her desperately disappointed from not becoming Juthathep's in-law. She blames Juthathep for making her missed hope in the past and gaslights the daughter to done the revenge for her.

==== Supporting ====
===== Trinattee =====
- Warapun Nguitragool as Siriporn Trinattee, an aunt of Dujapsorn
- Duanghathai Satdhathip as Cham, Siriporn's helper

===== Juthathep =====
- Natthawut Skidjai as M.R. Taratorn Juthathep / Khun Chai Yai, the father of Asira and Anistha
- Premsinee Ratanasopha as M.L. Raweeramphai Juthathep / Khun Maprang, the mother of Asira and Anistha. She tries to managed a couple between her child and Kedsara's child.
- Duangta Tungkamani as Oon / Khun Tuad Oon

The younger sister of Mom Aiet, the grandmother of 5 M.R.s and the great-grandmother of the M.L.s. Currently, she is in her 90s.

- Panitan Budkaew as Maj., M.L. Chatklao Juthathep, M.D. / Khun Chat

The only son of M.R. Puttipat and Krongkaew and the brother of Pokkate. He is an Orthopedic surgeon. He is working at the Fort Hospital near the country border in Chiang Rai province.

- Tate Myron as Pol. Capt., M.L. Ronnajak Juthathep / Khun Jak

The oldest son of M.R. Ronapee and Piangkwan, the eldest among four siblings. He is a police working at Narcotics Suppression Bureau (NSB). He is elegant, as used to be a model, and hilarious like his father.

- Kanawut Traipipattanapong as M.L. Phuthanate Juthathep / Khun Phu

The eldest son of M.R. Rachanon and Soifah and the older brother of Kanthika. He is the managing director and CEO of JT Development and JT Center. He is a perfectionist and good at management. He and Laorchan are preparing their wedding ceremony with the help of Asira and Dujapsorn.

- Noppakao Dechaphatthanakun as M.L. Saruj Juthathep / Khun Saruj

The second of Juthathap's 4th generation and the only son of M.R.Pawornruj and Wanrasa. Now, he is a diplomat following his father's footstep. He is calm and loves to serve his siblings, like his father. In addition, Saruj is the only one left out of the generation who doesn't have a girlfriend yet.

- Satdha Satdhathip as Suchart, M.L. Asira's chauffeur

===== Vanichmankong =====
- Phatrakorn Boosarakumwadi as Chalisa Vanichmankong

The middle child of Kedsara and Chinnakorn who graduated in accounting degree from aboard. She is bright and a working woman but easily deceived. So, her parents are worry and order Chavit to take care of her.

- Mayurin Pongpudpunth as M.L. Kedsara Vanichmankong, mother of Chavit, Chalisa and Porncheewa and the eldest daughter of M.R. Taewapan Dhevaprom. She is worry about her daughters, but also relieved because of Chavit helping. Kedsara also stressed about Mental illness of M.L. Wilairampa, which would affect Juthathep.
- Apinan Prasertwattanakul as Chinnakorn Vanichmankong, father of Chavit, Chalisa and Porncheewa. He become more mature and protective about his family, especially his daughters.

===== People at JT Property =====
- Adisorn Autthakrit as Kosol, JT Property's employee in Chiang Mai province
- Phutthachart Phongsuchart as Anusara, a secretary of M.L.Asira
- Parichat Praihirun as Kanlaya, JT Property's employee
- Junjira Junpitakchai as Looksorn, JT Property's employee
- Thamrong Khunphisut as Prissie, JT Property's PR employee
- Raiwin Ong as Nhu Neung, JT Property's PR employee
- Athichanan Srisevok as Meena, JT Property's employee
- Moleewan Pantharak as Jurairat, JT Property's employee

===== Others =====
- Dilok Thongwattana as M.R. Taewapan Dhevaprom
- Wongwachira Petchkeaw as Saratch

The senior of Anistha and Chalisa since the college's years and tries to get close to Chalisa for a reason.

- Pornnapha Theptinnakorn as Somruethai, Saratch's mother
- Donkamol Satdhathip as Sgt. Maj. Thong, a former subordinate of Asira
- Thitinan Klangpetch as Tangmo, Dujapsorn's close friend

==== Cameo ====
- Phol Tantasathien as ACM, M.R. Ronapee Juthathep / Khun Chai Pee

He always tried to seek out M.L. Wilairampa and wanted to apologize to her to make Oon happy. He is also the one important person who marked the scar on Wilairampa's heart, and she wants to avenge him.

- Sinjai Plengpanich as Piangkwan Juthathep Na Ayudhya

The wife of M.R. Ronapee, and the strong mother of Ronnajak and Ronnaphoom.

- Trin Seththachoke as Siriphong Trinattee / Phong, Dujapsorn' father
- Sarut Vichitrananda as M.R. Pawornruj Juthathep / Khun Chai Ruj
- Penpetch Benyakul as M.R. Puttipat Juthathep, M.D. / Khun Chai Pat
- Dom Hetrakil as M.R. Rachanon Juthathep / Khun Chai Lek, Father of Phuthanate and Kanthika
- Yeena Salas as Laorchan / Laor / Chao Laorchan Bhukhamwong

M.L. Phuthanate's fiancée and a descendant of Dhevaprom family. They are preparing their wedding ceremony with the help of Asira and Dujapsorn.

- Narilya Gulmongkolpech as Kwanruetai Pithaktheva / Kwan

She is courageous and naughty girl who is studying nursing. She is the daughter of M.L. Marathee and Sir Pinij and a girlfriend/fiancée of Chatklao.

- Eisaya Hosuwan as Jaiphisut Waiyatawee / Nhoo Pook

She is a girlfriend of M.L. Ronnajak and the teacher at the elementary school. She also inherited Dhevaprom's blood.

- Chanyaphat Ittiwibul as child Dujapsorn
- Thamtatch Tharinphirom as Chatchaval, M.D., a psychiatrist and M.L. Asira's friend
- Ploypapas Isarapongporn as Porncheewa Vanichmankong / Cheewa, youngest sister of Chavit and Chalisa
- James Ma as young M.R. Ronapee Juthathep / Khun Chai Pee
- Virakarn Senitantikul as Waraporn Tarapornkul / Poo
- Esther Supreeleela as young M.L. Wilairampa Dhevaprom
- Unruen Rachot as Jaew, Oon personal servant
- Kosawit Piyasakulkaew as Vibul, JT Property's business rivalry
- Naphatsawan Iris Wilsm as child M.L. Anistha Juthathep

== Porncheewan ==
Porncheewan (Note: Thai: พรชีวัน, romanized: Porncheewan, RTGS: Sublime life) is the fifth drama of the series, based on a novel series of the same name. Its novel is written by Romkaew and is the sequel of Khun Chai Pawornruj. The drama is produced by GOOD Feeling Co., Ltd. Somjing Srisuparp is both producer and director. Moreover, the drama is filmed in Switzerland.

=== Plot ===
The optimistic daughter of M.L. Kratin Wongnakorn, Cheewan who received a scholarship from Oon to study in Switzerland. (Note: In the novel depicts about Italy) She takes the order from Oon to be the cupid building a relationship between M.L. Saruj Juthathep and Porncheewa, the youngest daughter of Kedsara. The mission is challenging since the both are arrogant, cold and also undemonstrative.

The story would go well, if the profound charm of the secretary is not get into the eyes' of the cupid, which causing she falls in the love with him.

=== Cast ===
==== Main ====
- Punpreedee Khumprom Rodsaward as Cheewan Wongnakorn
  - Pawarisa Surathin as child Cheewan

The only daughter of Kratin, one of the Dhevaprom relatives. She is close to Porncheewa because they are nearly the same in age and has been playing together since they were young. She received the scholarship from Oon to study in Switzerland, and went on to study at the same time as Porncheewa. She is a bright, brave, patient and grateful person. So, she is definitely willing to make Oon's wishes come true.

- Noppakao Dechaphatthanakun as M.L. Saruj Juthathep / Khun Saruj
  - Rachit Tangcheewacharoen as child M.L. Saruj / Khun Saruj

The second of Juthathap's 4th generation, and the only son of M.R. Pawornruj and Wanrasa. Now, he is the first secretary of the Embassy of Thailand in Bern, Switzerland. (Note: In the novel depicts about Rome, Italy) He is calm, arrogant, cold and loves to serve his siblings like his father.

- Suppapong Udomkaewkanjana as Flg. Off., M.L. Ronnaphoom Juthathep / Khun Phoom
  - Theepakorn Taechavibulsak as child M.L. Ronnaphoom / Khun

The second son of M.R. Ronapee and Piangkwan. He is the Royal Thai Air Force fighter pilot of F-16 in the 1st Airborne, Nakhon Ratchasima. He is a funny person like his brother and father, and has the sixth sense of futures event. He follows his sense to do something for helping Porncheewa.

- Ploypapas Isarapongporn as Porncheewa Vanichmankong

The youngest daughter of Kedsara and Chinnakorn, who received a scholarship to study in Switzerland. She is arrogant, beautiful, well-mannered and undemonstrative. She knows that the adults wish her to marry M.L. Saruj, but she doesn't like being forced and wants to choose that person herself. However, she is gullible because grew up with the overprotective from the family since young.

- Akekarin Runggran as Dalad

He is Dara's younger brother and studying while working in Switzerland. He come from low-income family; therefore, he has done so much works for gain the money. But, he has no plan to do a business for growth.

==== Supporting ====
===== People aroud Cheewan =====
- Phimmara Charoenpukdi as M.L. Kratin Wongnakorn

The mother of Cheewan. She is a one M.L. of Dhevaprom from the youngest brother of Taewapan line, but she was born in Southern Thailand and married her native husband.

- Thitinan Suwannasak as Luechai Wongnakorn / Klao

Cheewan's father who is the owner of a rubber plantation in the southern. He is warm and a family man.

- Peerakrit Pacharaboonyakieat as Nop

Cheewan's friend in her hometown, whose parents both wish that they would engage to each other.

- Pitisak Yaowananont as Pana, Nop's father and Klao's friend
- N/A as Kid Wongnakorn, Cheewan's older brother
- N/A as Kong Wongnakorn, Cheewan's older brother
- N/A as Komsan Wongnakorn, Cheewan's older brother
- Thananchai Hieanchasri as Jon
- Natthachai Sirinantachote as Chid
- Kongkid Wisetsiri as Chom
- Krittawat Chaodee as Cheop
- Anuwan Jirananthawat as Chaluay

===== Juthathep =====
- Sarut Vichitrananda as M.R. Pawornruj Juthathep, a retired ambassador and father of M.L. Saruj
- Sarocha Watittapan as Wanrasa Juthathep Na Ayudhya, the mother of M.L. Saruj
- Duangta Tungkamani as Oon / Khun Tuad Oon

The younger sister of Mom Aiet, the grandmother of 5 M.R.s and the great-grandmother of the M.L.s. Currently, she is in her 90s.

- Kongthap Peak as M.L. Asira Juthathep / Khun Phet
  - Nathanont Thanachotikul as child M.L. Asira / Khun Phet

The oldest son of M.R. Taratorn and M.L. Raweerampai Juthathep, the oldest among the 4th generation of the family. He is calm and brave as the eldest. He used to be soldier in the special unit but later quitted for becoming CEO of JT Property after his father's retirement.

- Panitan Budkaew as Maj., M.L. Chatklao Juthathep, M.D. / Khun Chat
  - Sébastien Haller Rattanakul as child M.L. Chatklao / Khun Chat

The only son of M.R. Puttipat and Krongkaew and the brother of Pokkate. He is an Orthopedic surgeon. He is working at the Fort Hospital near the country border in Chiang Rai province. He is also groom-to-be of Kwanruetai in the upcoming wedding.

- Tate Myron as Pol. Capt., M.L. Ronnajak Juthathep / Khun Jak
  - Win Sakulsaengprapha as child M.L. Ronnajak / Khun Jak

The oldest son of M.R. Ronapee and Piangkwan, the eldest among four siblings. He is a police officer working at the Narcotics Suppression Bureau (NSB). He is elegant, as used to be a model, and hilarious like his father.

- Kanawut Traipipattanapong as M.L. Phuthanate Juthathep / Khun Phu
  - Rachata Sakulsinghdusit as child M.L. Phuthanate / Khun Phu

The eldest son of M.R. Rachanon and Soifah and older brother of Kanthika. He is the managing director and CEO of JT Development and JT Center. He is a perfectionist and good at management. Phuthanate married Laorchan and they have a child.

- Unruen Rachot as Jaew, Oon's personal servant
- Joopjeep Cheonyim as Jon, Saruj's servant and housekeeper

===== People aroud Porncheewa =====
- Mayurin Pongpudpunth as M.L. Kedsara Vanichmankong, mother of Chavit, Chalisa and Porncheewa
- Apinan Prasertwattanakul as Chinnakorn Vanichmankong, father of Chavit, Chalisa and Porncheewa
- Nichakoon Khajornborirak as Chavit Vanichmankong / Vit

The eldest son of Kedsara and Chinnakorn and a CEO of the family's gold shop. He is funny and bright, but also a caring brother at the same time. He is newly married M.L. Anistha.

- Phatrakorn Boosarakumwadi as Chalisa Vanichmankong

The middle child of Kedsara and Chinnakorn and older sister of Porncheewa.

- Chayanit Chayjaroen as M.L. Anistha Vanichmankong / Khun ploy

The younger sister of M.L. Asira and a wife of Chavit Vanichmankong.

===== Others =====
- Buntawit Tragulpanich as Natsarit, Thai student who has a powerful family
- Danny Lucias as Semon, an apartment keeper
- Chanikan Sopidvisit as Venus, Cheewan's close friend
- Waratthaya Wongchayaporn as Mussalin, Saruj's ex-girlfriend
- Rina Chatamornchai as Dara, Thai student who is Dalad's older sister
- Ratchanok Sreelopan as Nadesurang, Natsarid's sister
- Dilok Thongwattana as M.R. Taewapan Dhevaprom
- Pussorn Boonyakiat as Khun Ying Veena, mother of Venus
- Chartayodom Hiranyasthiti as Nava, father of Natsarit and Nadesurang
- Nutphongpol Suddee as Mod, Natsarit's follower
- Kanlaya Lerdkasemsub as Mussalin's mother

==== Cameo ====
- Yeena Salas as Laorchan Juthathep Na Ayudhya / Chao Laorchan

M.L. Phuthanet's wife and a descendant of Dhevaprom family. She has a son with Phuthanet.

- Narilya Gulmongkolpech as Kwanruetai Pithaktheva / Kwanruetai Juthathep Na Ayudhya / Kwan

The disobedient fiancée of Chatklao, who would marry after graduating from the nursing course.

- Eisaya Hosuwan as Jaiphisut Juthathep Na Ayudhya / Nhoo Pook

She is the wife of M.L. Ronnajak and the teacher at the elementary school. She also inherited Dhevaprom's blood.

- Ranchrawee Uakoolwarawat as Dujapsorn Juthathep Na Ayudhya / Fah

The daughter of M.L. Wilairampa Trinattee and the wife of Asira.

- Natthawut Skidjai as M.R. Taratorn Juthathep / Khun Chai Yai
- Premsinee Ratanasopha as M.L. Raweeramphai Juthathep / Khun Maprang
- Penpetch Benyakul as M.R. Puttipat Juthathep, M.D. / Khun Chai Pat
- Rinlanee Sripen as Krongkaew Juthathep Na Ayudhya / Kaew
- Dom Hetrakul as M.R. Rachanon Juthathep, father of Phuthanate and Kanthika
- Ramavadee Nakchudtree as Soifah Juthathep Na Ayudhya, mother of Phuthanate and Kanthika
- Phol Tantasathien as ACM, M.R. Ronapee Juthathep / Khun Chai Pee
- Sinjai Plengpanich as Piangkwan Juthathep Na Ayudhya / Kwan

The wife of M.R.Ronapee and the mother of Ronnajak, Ronnaphoom, Ronnaret and Ronnakorn. She is still a legend in the film industry.

- Sakaojai Poolsawad as M.L. Manee Pithakthewa / M.L.Marathee Dhevaprom, the mother of Kwanruetai
- Thanachot Kusumrasananan as Ton

== Anecdotes ==
- Chao is the rank that refers to the people who is the descendant of the royal family, the meaning is vary to the country it used.
- In Thailand, the royal language doesn't use only with Mom Rajawongse (M.R.) and Mom Luang (M.L.) ranks, which they are the lowest ranks.
- The rank Mom Rajawongse (M.R.) is casually called Khun Chai for male and Khun Ying for female. However, Khun Ying also can receive noble titles from the king or uses with a common individual who married with a high ranks military.
- The rank Mom Luang (M.L.) is the bottom Thai royal rank, casually called Khun
- Mom is the rank which have many way to receive; however, in this article refers mostly to a commoner who married to a prince.
- JT Development is the company established by M.R. Rachanon Juthathep, having other Juthathep members as the shareholders and M.L. Phuthanate as the CEO.
- JT Center is the department store that managed under JT Development, having M.L. Phuthanate as the CEO and M.L. Kanthika as HR director.
- JT Property Group Pub Co., Ltd. or JT Property is a real estate business established by M.R. Taratorn, having M.L. Asira as CEO and M.L. Anistha as CFO.
- Atchanajakkara or The Third Eye Sapphire, the mysterious sapphire necklace of Bhukhamwong royal that has many myths.
- PG Engineer, the construction company of Thanasak family, of which Phakrat came in managing after returning from aboard.
- Songpattanasuksa school is the elementary school which M.L. Phuthanate, M.L. Ronnajak and Jaiphisut used to attended. The owner is Songsamorn and Jaiphisut also being an English teacher there.

== Original soundtracks ==
=== Laorchan ===
No.	Title	Lyrics	Music	Artist(s)	Length
1.	"Soulmate" (Thai: Soulmate)	Narongvit Taechatanawat	Poramate Meuansanit	Sadanun Balenciaga	3:29
2.	"One Day" (Thai: One Day)	Narongvit Taechatanawat	Jakkrit Makkanaso	Anuwat Saejow	3:52
Total length:					7:21

=== Kwanruetai ===
No.	Title	Lyrics	Music	Artist(s)	Length
1.	"Yha Plai Mue" (Thai: อย่าปล่อยมือ)	Narongvit Taechatanawat	Narongvit Taechatanawat	Jaruwat Cheawaram; Wan Wanwan	3:21
2.	"Tha Thoe OK" (Thai: ถ้าเธอ OK)	Okomo P	Okomo P	Narilya Gulmongkolpech	3:59
Total length:					7:20

=== Jaiphisut ===
No.	Title	Lyrics	Music	Artist(s)	Length
1.	"Khod Ja Rak" (Thai: โคตรจะรัก)	Wichian Tantipimonphan	Wichian Tantipimonphan	Isara Kitnitchi	3:07
2.	"Phueng Khao Jai" (Thai: เพิ่งเข้าใจ)	Wassakorn Dechsutham; Terdsak Janpan	Santi Chaipreecha	Jessada Trirongkit	3:09
3.	"Thang Khanan" (Thai: ทางขนาน)	Wichian Tantipimonphan	Wichian Tantipimonphan	Atitaya Tribudarak	5:45
Total length:					11:01

=== Dujapsorn ===
No.	Title	Lyrics	Music	Artist(s)	Length
1.	"I wish you the sky" (Thai: ฟ้า)	Kongthap Peak	Kongthap Peak	Kongthap Peak	4:16
2.	"Love me or Leave me" (Thai: จะรักหรือจากฉันไป)	Monthawan Sriwichian	Reuangkij Yongpiyakul	Marie Eugenie Le Lay	3:56
Total length:					8:12

=== Porncheewan ===
No.	Title	Lyrics	Music	Artist(s)	Length
1.	"Kan Wela Pisud Rak Tae" (Thai: กาลเวลาพิสูจน์รักแท้)	Narongvit Taechatanawat	Jakkrit Makkanaso	Chawarin Perdpiriyawong	4:06
2.	"Mai Mee Tee Yeun" (Thai: ไม่มีที่ยืน)	Panya Pakunpanya	Burin Supakarapongkul	Nichaphat Chatchaipholrat	3:28
Total length:					7:34
