= Love of Silom =

2026 Thai television series

- Official series poster
- Thai: รักแห่งสีลม
- Genre: Boys' love; Romantic drama
- Based on: Love of Silom by Violet Rain
- Screenplay by: Kanokphan Ornrattanasakul; Issaraporn Kuntisuk; Irene Insot; Natthakit Fungcharoen
- Directed by: Banchorn Vorasataree
- Starring: Poompat Iam-samang; Phuripan Sapsangsawat
- Ending theme: "หมดที่ชีวิตของคนคนนึงจะมี (La La La La)" by Jetset’er
- Country of origin: Thailand
- Original language: Thai
- No. of episodes: 12

Production
- Executive producers: Nattaporn Runghajornklin; Amiee Liu
- Producers: Arisa Srisongkram; Khaunkhaow Waitayakul
- Cinematography: Maneerat Srinakarin; Ratchanon Kaeosart
- Running time: 42–78 minutes
- Production companies: Insight Entertainment; YYDS Entertainment

Original release
- Network: WeTV
- Release: 24 April – 10 July 2026

Love of Silom (Thai: รักแห่งสีลม; RTGS: Rak Haeng Si Lom) is a 2026 Thai boys' love television series, starring Poompat Iam-samang (Up) and Phuripan Sapsangsawat (Poom), based on the novel of the same name by Violet Rain. The series is directed by Banchorn Vorasataree (Pepsi), and is a co-production between Insight Entertainment and YYDS Entertainment.

The series premiered on WeTV on 24 April 2026, airing weekly on Fridays at 20:00 ICT. The series concluded on 10 July 2026.

== Synopsis ==
Wayu (Phuripan Sapsangsawat) works at Moonlight Bar, a nightclub around Silom. He withdraws from his architecture program at university in order to work to pay off his mother's debt and take care of his nephew, Singto (Nonnarat Weeraratsuphakul). Krit (Poompat Iam-samang) is raised in a traditional Thai-Chinese family and is expected to follow his father's career in the police force, although he does not share this aspiration. His family disapproves of same-sex relationships, which affects his personal life, including a previous relationship that ended. Krit and Wayu meet at the nightclub and continue to encounter each other over time. As their interactions increase, a relationship develops between them.

== Cast ==
=== Main ===
- Poompat Iam-samang (Up) as Krisadawut Siriwatmontri (Krit)
- Phuripan Sapsangsawat (Poom) as Sippakorn Tangsamai (Wayu)

=== Supporting ===
- Sirivitch Kamonworawut (Jai Sira) as Foei
- Chanakan Poonsiriwong (Boss) as Sky
- Supakit Sookdamrongvanich (Volvo) as Tai
- Perawitch Chotimanon (F4) as Richy
- Intouch Kooramasuwan as Kenji
- Tanapon Hathaidachadusadee (Kade) as Henry
- Yanissa Diratorntum (Gam) as Phirapha Sirihanphaibun (Rose)
- Talay Sanguandikul as Mind
- Ingkarat Damrongsakkul (Ryu) as Pete
- Phollawat Manuprasert (Tom) as Pitak (Krit's father)
- Wacharin Anantapong (Rina) as Pimjit (Krit's mother)
- Ken Zeal as Athip Phongwilai
- Duangjai Hiransri (Pure) as Pilai (Wayu's mother)
- Nujthanicha Rojjanajarunun (Nujnoh) as Waralak Tangsamai (Wai)
- Nonnarat Weeraratsuphakul (Leica) as Singto
- Taofa Maneeprasopchok (Tan) as Ice
- Khanatsanan Naktakhe (Mark) as Nut
- Somchai Leelarukskul as Por

=== Guest ===
- Natsakan Chairote (Gunner) as Chainphop Udomdirek
- Pornthiphat Lertwuthanon (Mashii) as Mint

== Soundtrack ==
Love of Silom Soundtrack
No.	Title	Writer(s)	Artist	Length
1.	"Just to Be the Last Person You Think Of (แค่ได้เป็นคนสุดท้ายที่เธอคิดถึง)"	Fongbeer	Pause	4:34
2.	"La La La La (หมดที่ชีวิตของคนคนนึงจะมี)"	Fongbeer	Jetset'er	4:52
3.	"Unlock (เธอคงไม่เหมือนที่ผ่านมา)"	Fongbeer	Season Five	4:45
4.	"Cartoon with Sweet Eyes (การ์ตูนตาหวาน)" (Original by Weeed Bomb)	Fongbeer	Talay Sanguandikul	4:22
5.	"Actually (ที่จริง)" (Original by Beam Voranan)	Fongbeer	Uppoompat; Beam Voranan	4:55

== Production ==
The series was announced at the WeTV Always More 2026 event on 4 November 2025. A video titled "Official First Look" was released, featuring behind-the-scenes footage and early promotional material. The official trailer was released on 7 April 2026 on WeTV's YouTube channel.

== Marketing ==
The series was launched with the Sip and See PressCon event held at Fake Club Bangkok on 17 April 2026. The event featured performances by the cast, as well as the bands Jetset'er and Season Five, which contributed to the soundtrack of the series.

The series premiered with the Love of Silom First Premiere: Our First Night event, held at Siam Pavalai Royal Grand Theatre, Siam Paragon on 24 April 2026.

== Awards and nominations ==
Award nominations for Love of Silom
Year	Award	Category	Nominee(s)	Result	Ref.
2026	The Viral Hits Thailand Spotlight Awards 2026	Best BL Couple Actors	Poompat Iam-samang and Phuripan Sapsangsawat	Won	
