= Lovely Writer =

2021 Thai television series

- Promotional poster
- Thai: นับสิบจะจูบ
- Genre: Romance; Drama
- Created by: Good Feeling; Dee Tuk Wan 2019
- Based on: นับสิบจะจูบ by Wankling
- Directed by: Bundit Sintanaparadee
- Starring: Noppakao Dechaphatthanakun; Poompat Iam-samang
- Country of origin: Thailand
- Original language: Thai
- No. of seasons: 1
- No. of episodes: 12 + 1 special episode

Production
- Production companies: Good Feeling; Dee Tuk Wan 2019; Dee Hup House

Original release
- Network: Channel 3
- Release: February 24 – May 12, 2021

Lovely Writer (Thai: นับสิบจะจูบ; Nap Sip Cha Chup , lit. Nubsib Will Kiss), is a Thai television series starring Noppakao Dechaphatthanakun and Poompat Iam-samang. Directed by Bundit Sintanaparadee and produced by Good Feeling and Dee Tuk Wan 2019 together with Dee Hup House, the series is first broadcast on Channel 3 before appearing on the official YouTube channel a week later. The series is adapted from the novel, Nap Sip Cha Chup (นับสิบจะจูบ). The main characters, Gene and Nubsib, share a deep connection and need to navigate the demands of the boys' love business in which they're both involved in.

The series released a special episode titled Lovely Writer: 2 Years of Love, 2gether or Not? due to its pan-Asian popularity. It focused on the relationship between Nubsib and Gene two years the conclusion of their story. It was featured on Teen Vogue's best BL dramas of 2021 list.

== Synopsis ==
Gene (Poompat Iam-samang) is a writer (known by his pen name Wizard) who wants to publish a new dark fantasy novel. But it turns out that the head of the publishing house wants him to write a novel in the Boys' Love genre. After the success of his first novel, he is pressured to write another book in the same genre despite his discomfort with it.

He then finds out that one of his novels entitled Bad Engineer will be adapted into an TV series, and he is invited to give his opinion during the casting for the main roles of the series. There, he meets Nubsib (Noppakao Dechaphatthanakun) who auditioned for the series and caught Gene's attention. In the following days, their paths cross again when Nubsib's manager Tum asks if Nubsib can live at Gene's apartment until he can find him permanent lodging while the series is being filmed. Gene decides to let Nubsib stay for one month. With Nubsib at Gene's apartment, their feelings become deeper, laced with unlocked secrets, revelations, jealousy and romance. Will their love have a happily ever after just like in his novels?

== Cast and characters ==
=== Main ===
- Noppakao Dechaphatthanakun (Kao) as Nubsib
- Poompat Iam-samang (Up) as Gene

=== Supporting ===
- Wasin Panunaporn (Kenji) as Hin
- Sirikorn Kananuruk (Bruce) as Aey
- Prarunyu Sooksamram (Ken) as Tum
- Natharuetai Akkarakijwattanakul (Zorzo) as Tiffy
- Suppacheep Chanapai (Chap) as Saymork
