= TharnType =

2019–20 Thai television series

- Thai: เกลียดนักมาเป็นที่รักกันซะดีๆ
- Genre: BL
- Based on: TharnType Story เกลียดนักมาเป็นที่รักกันซะดีๆ by MAME
- Written by: Orawan Vichayawannakul (MAME); Vichayaporn Sukkul; Wanna Kortunyavat
- Directed by: Bundit Sintanaparadee
- Starring: Suppasit Jongcheveevat (Mew); Kanawut Traipipattanapong (Gulf)
- Opening theme: ไม่ยอม (Be Mine) by Pop Jirapat
- Ending theme: ขอแค่เธอ (Hold Me Tight) by Off Chainon
- Country of origin: Thailand
- Original language: Thai
- No. of seasons: 2
- No. of episodes: 24 + 2 special episodes

Production
- Production location: Thailand
- Running time: 50 minutes
- Production company: Me Mind Y

Original release
- Network: One 31; LINE TV (repeats)
- Release: 7 October 2019 – 6 January 2020

Related
- Love by Chance; Don't Say No: The Series; TharnType 2: 7 Years of Love

TharnType: The Series is a 2019 Thai BL television series starring Suppasit Jongcheveevat and Kanawut Traipipattanapong. It portrays a homophobic college student, Type, who unexpectedly begins to develop feelings for Tharn, his gay roommate. However, problems arise when jealousy and suspicion get in the way of their relationship. It is an adaptation of the popular web novel TharnType Story เกลียดนักมาเป็นที่รักกันซะดีๆ (eng. TharnType's Story: Hate You, Love You More) by MAME (Orawan Vichayawannakul). The story is about a prejudiced university boy and his homosexual roommate who have a tense relationship, but gradually open up to one other, developing their hate into affection. The series, directed by Bundit Sintanaparadee (Tee) and produced by Me Mind Y, (Note: Owned by Orawan Vichayawannakul, the author of the novel which this series is based on) premiered in Thailand and aired on One 31 from 7 October 2019 to 6 January 2020 with repeats on LINE TV. A special episode titled TharnType Special, Our Final Love was screened on 19 January 2020 at Siam Pavalai Royal Grand Theatre.

== Synopsis ==
Type Thiwat is a handsome freshman with a passion for football and spicy food. Although he is a friendly boy, he hates gay people because, in his childhood, he was molested by a male worker at his family's resort. His life turns upside down when the new academic year of college brings along a charismatic roommate, Tharn Kirigun. Tharn is a gorgeous, compassionate music major, who is also openly gay. When Type learns this, he is determined to make Tharn leave the dorm, as he refuses to live with a gay person. Tharn is equally determined not to give into Type's homophobic demands and tantrums. The tension between the two increases as they explore romantic, and eventually sexual, dimensions of their relationship.

== Cast and characters ==
Below is the cast of the series:

=== Main ===
- Suppasit Jongcheveevat (Mew) as Tharn Thara Kirigun
- Kanawut Traipipattanapong (Gulf) as Type Thiwat Phawattakun

=== Supporting ===
- Suttinut Uengtrakul (Mild) as Techno
- Kittipat Kaewcharoen (Kaownah) as Lhong
- Natthad Kunakornkiat (Hiter) as Tum
- Parinya Angsanan (Kokliang) as Tar
- Napat Sinnakuan (Boat) as Champ
- Thanayut Thakoonauttaya (Tong) as Thorn
- Tanawin Duangnate (Mawin) as Khlui
- Kantheephop Sirorattanaphanit (Run) as Seo
- Wasin Panunaporn (Kenji) as Technic
- Pongkorn Wongkrittiyarat (Kaprao) as Khom
- Pattarabut Kiennukul (AA) as San
- Siwapohn Langkapin (Eye) as Puifai

=== Guest role ===
- Suppapong Udomkaewkanjana (Saint) as Pete
- Phiravich Attachitsataporn (Mean) as Tin
- Siwat Jumlongkul (Mark) as Kengkla

== Original Media ==
The novel TharnType Story เกลียดนักมาเป็นที่รักกันซะดีๆ was first released online on 2 December 2014, via Dek-D.com's platform for writers. Even though the story is a spinoff of MAME's previous novel My Accidental Love is You, the event of TharnType Story takes place three years prior to the latter. The novel was published as a physical copy in 2016, compiling 62 chapters into two books. A sequel story consists of 22 chapters about Tharn and Type's life as a couple in their seventh year was published as one physical book following the first two books. As of 2020, TharnType Story has 216% ratings on its Dek-D official page with over 3.8 million total views.

== Soundtracks ==
Song title	Romanized title	Artist	Ref.
ไม่ยอม	Be Mine (Main)	Pop Jirapat	
ไม่ยอม	Be Mine	Kaownah Kittipat	
ขอแค่เธอ	Hold Me Tight	Off Chainon	
ขอแค่เธอ	Hold Me Tight (Acoustic)	Suppasit Jongcheveevat	

== Awards ==
Year	Award	Category	Result
2020	Line TV Awards 2020	Best Kiss Scene	Won (Suppasit Jongcheveevat and Kanawut Traipipattanapong)
2020	Kazz Awards 2020	Best Couple of The Year	Nominated (Suppasit Jongcheveevat and Kanawut Traipipattanapong)
2020	Kazz Awards 2020	Best Scene	Won (Suppasit Jongcheveevat and Kanawut Traipipattanapong)
2020	Kazz Awards 2020	Hot Young Star	Nominated; Kanawut Traipipattanapong
2020	Kazz Awards 2020	Hot Young Star	Won; Suppasit Jongcheveevat
2020	Howe Awards 2019	Best Couple	Won (Suppasit Jongcheveevat and Kanawut Traipipattanapong)
2020	Thai Crazy Awards 2020	Best Gay Series	Won (TharnType: The Series)
2020	Thai Crazy Awards 2020	Best Gay Couple	Won (Suppasit Jongcheveevat and Kanawut Traipipattanapong)
2020	Maya Awards 2020	Series of The Year	Nominated (TharnType: The Series)
2020	Maya Awards 2020	Best Couple	Won (Suppasit Jongcheveevat and Kanawut Traipipattanapong)
2020	Maya Awards 2020	Male Star	Won (Suppasit Jongcheveevat)
2020	Maya Awards 2020	Best Soundtrack	Nominated (Off Chainon - Hold Me Tight)
