= Bad Romeo =

- Genre: Romantic drama
- Screenplay by: Donnaya Sapying
- Directed by: Ampaiporn Jitmai-ngong
- Starring: Mario Maurer; Urassaya Sperbund; Thatchathorn Sapanant; Chutimon Chuengcharoensukying
- Country of origin: Thailand
- Original language: Thai
- No. of seasons: 1
- No. of episodes: 17

Production
- Producer: Anne Thongprasom

Original release
- Network: Channel 3
- Release: 20 July – 14 September 2022

Bad Romeo (Thai: คือเธอ) is a Thai romantic drama television series, produced by Thong Entertainment Company Limited by Anne Thongprasom from the director of Nonzee Nimibutr in the beginning and Ampaiporn Jitmai-ngong in the latter part. The show was broadcast on Channel 3 HD and was written by Danaya Supying. It stars Mario Maurer and Urassaya Sperbund. It first aired on 20 July 2022, and is available for streaming on Netflix.

== Cast ==
=== Main cast ===
- Mario Maurer (Oh) as Kaokhla Chayodom (Kla):
  Garage owner and lover of Sai Khim Before changing his name to Carl Raman, he was adopted by Asia.:
  Acting as Nate Raman:
  Asia's son and Kao Kla's half-brother.
- Urassaya Sperbund (Yaya) as Saikhim Kidakarn (Kim):
  Daughter of Songsin and Kao Kla's lover
- Thatchathorn Sapanant (Pop) as Thanthai Tulanon (Than):
  The son of a bank owner and fiancee of Sai Khim.
- Chutimon Chuengcharoensukying (Aokbab) as Chalita Thongma (Lita):
  A close friend of Sai Khim. Changed the letters according to Songsilp's order, causing misunderstandings between Kao Kla and Sai Khim.

=== Supporting cast ===
- Metinee Kingpayom (Lukkade) as Asia Raman:
  Kao Kla's adoptive mother
- Ranchrawee Uakoolwarawat (Mint) as Claire:
  A famous model, Kao Kla's partner.
- Wanchana Sawatdee (Bird) as Roek Chayodom:
  Kao Kla's adoptive father and Kloy Jai's father
- Supachai Suwanon (Palm) as Khem:
  close friend of Kao Kla
- Marilyn Kate Gardner (Kate) as Kloijai Chayodom (Kloi):
  Kao Kla's adoptive sister
- Varit Hongsananda (Pao) as Promphat (Prom):
  Pijika's son and Sai Khim's cousin.
- Sananthachat Thanapatpisal (Fon) as Primprao (Prim):
  Pijika's daughter and Sai Khim's cousin.
- Angsana Buranon (Muay) as Phijika:
  Promphat and Primbao's mother and sister-in-law of Songsil
- Sarut Vijittranon (Big) as Sansoen:
  close friend of songsil
- Narumol Nilawan (Toi) as Aunruen (Aun):
  maid of songsil

=== Cameo cast ===
- Ramawadee Sirisuka (Pupae) as Rarin:
  Sai Khim's mother and Claire's adoptive mother.
- Chanana Nutakom (Dee) as Sagee Thongma:
  Lita's mother
- Punpreedee Khumprom Rodsaward (PP) as Yamsom / Noeysod:
  Kao Kla's ex-girlfriend
- Rachanat Kampanatsanyakorn (Pong) as Khimhan Dechakorn:
  Prompat's friend
- Nam-nguen Boonnak (Peak) as Nam-thong:
  The owner of the ancient house next to the hotel.
- Dr.Puwanart Kunpalin (Un) as Show host opens the news
- Kanticha Vansteenberge (Emilie) as Saikim (Kjm) (young)
- Parichat Rakmark (Noi) as Choe:
  Namthong's maid
- Nattanon Pinrojnkeerathi (Napat) as civil servant:
  Sagee's new lover
- Surapol Poonpiriya (Lek) as Thamrong Tulanon:
  Tantai's father and bank owner.

== Production ==
In June 2020, Anne Thongprasom as the drama's producer published images of Mario Maurer and Urassaya Sperbund as the protagonist and heroine of this drama on her personal Instagram, and announced the name of the drama is Bad Romeo.

Due to the COVID-19 pandemic in Thailand, the production of this drama was delayed and took more than 2 years to film.
