= Poompat Iam-samang =

Thai actor, model and singer (born 1994)

- ภูมิพัฒน์ เอี่ยมสำอาง
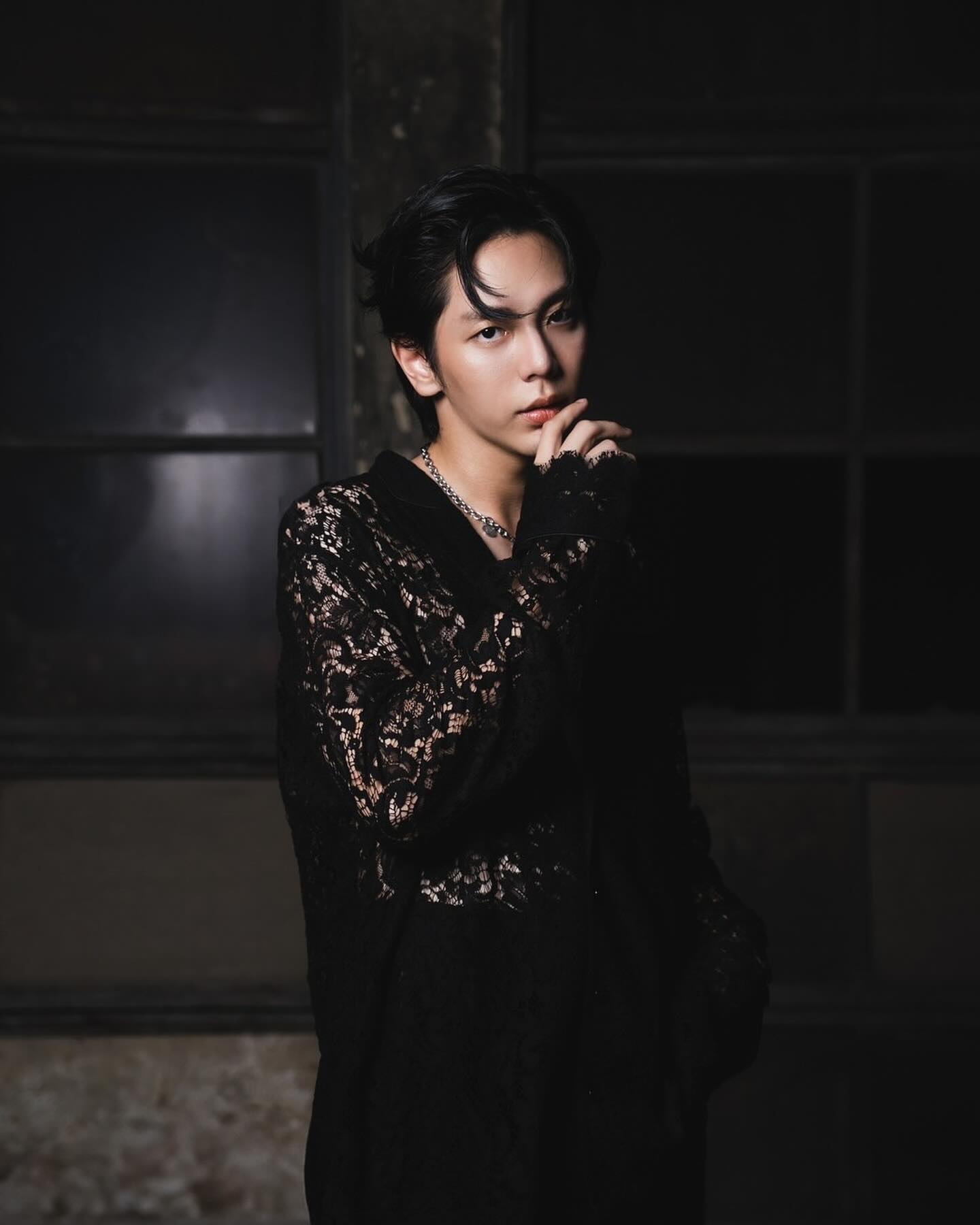
- Poompat in 2024
- Born: 4 December 1994 (age 31); Bangkok, Thailand
- Other name: Up (อัพ)
- Education: Chulalongkorn University (B.A. Communication Arts); SOAS University of London (M.Sc. International Relation and Diplomacy)
- Occupations: Actor; Singer
- Years active: 2015–present
- Notable work: Lovely Writer
- Height: 1.80 m (5 ft 11 in)

Poompat Iam-samang (Thai: ภูมิพัฒน์ เอี่ยมสำอาง; born 4 December 1994), professionally known as Up Poompat (Thai: อัพ ภูมิพัฒน์), is a Thai actor, and singer. He is best known for his leading role as Gene in Lovely Writer, and Ming in My Stand-In.

== Biography ==
Poompat Iam-Samang was born in Bangkok, Thailand on 4 December 1994. He studied management communication at the Communication Art Faculty of Chulalongkorn University. He also acted in campus theatre. After graduating, he went to England to attain a master's in International Studies and Diplomacy at SOAS University of London Currently, he is pursuing doctorate degree in International Development Studies at the Faculty of Political Science at Chulalongkorn University.

== Career ==
In 2015, Up debuted as an actor in a Thai movie Gifted, where he played the lead role. Known for his Korean looks, he received multiple offers to work for popular cosmetic brands. In 2016, he went to South Korean reality television program Babel 250 as a regular member.

In 2018, Poompat starred in e-sports drama GGEZ as Sabi and in same year he appeared as a guest star in highly acclaimed Thai TV series Girl From Nowhere.

In 2021, Poompat starred in BL adaption of novel, Lovely Writer playing the lead role, Gene alongside Noppakao Dechaphatthanakun. The series, aired on Channel 3 and subsequently on YouTube, gained a lot of popularity.

== Other works ==
Poompat is the owner of a YouTube and Instagram called uppoompat, where he posts content related to promotional activities along with vlogs and collaboration with other artists.

Apart from having an active acting career, Poompat also co-owns an Artist Management company called JustUp Co. Ltd., which was registered in January 2021.

== Filmography ==
=== Film ===
Year	Title	Role	Notes	Ref.
2015	Gifted	Wave	Main role	

=== Television ===
Year	Title	Role	Notes	Ref.
2018	GGEZ	Sabi	Support role	
2018	Girl from Nowhere	Hok	Guest role	
2021	Lovely Writer	Gene	Main role	
2021	Me Always You: The Series	Khanan	Support role	
2022	Club Sapan Fine 2	Sun	Support role	
2023	Step by Step	Put	Support role / Producer	
2024	Start-Up	Korn	Main role	
2024	My Stand-in	Ming	Main role	
2026	Love of Silom	Krit	Main role	

=== Music video appearances ===
Year	Song Title	Artist	Ref.
2013	"อยากกลับไปเป็นเพื่อนเธอ (Unfriended Request)"	Thank You	
2017	"อยู่นี่ไง"	Atom ชนกันต์	
2017	"Love Is Now รักอยู่ตรงหน้า"	The Toys	
2022	"เธอคือของขวัญที่ดีที่สุด"	ETC	

=== Reality TV ===
Year	Title	Role	Notes	Ref.
2016	Babel 250	Himself	Regular member	
