= Sutthirak Subvijitra =

Thai model and actor

- Born: January 28, 1993 (age 33)
- Occupation: Actor
- Height: 1.85 m (6 ft 1 in)

Sutthirak Subvijitra (Born January 28, 1993) is a Thai actor of Spanish descent, currently signed with Skybox Entertainment, a subsidiary of Workpoint Entertainment.

== Biography ==
Sutthirak Subvijitra was born on Thursday, January 28, 1993. He is the son of Pisut Subvijitra, a famous rock musician and senator, and Jacqueline Apithananont, a former actress. He is also the stepson of Mom Luang Nattakorn Devakula. He holds a Bachelor of Arts degree in Creative Advertising and Marketing from the Faculty of Communication Arts, Bangkok University. And a master's degree in political science, specializing in government, from the Faculty of Political Science, Chulalongkorn University.

== Career ==
Sutthirak began his career in the entertainment industry as a music video actor, appearing in works by several well-known artists. In 2016, he made his acting debut in the sitcom Krob Krua Tua Salap (Swapped Family), which aired on True4U, portraying as Ball. He later signed an acting contract with Broadcast Thai Television.
