= Kanawut Traipipattanapong =

Thai actor and model (born 1997)

- คณาวุฒิ ไตรพิพัฒนพงษ์
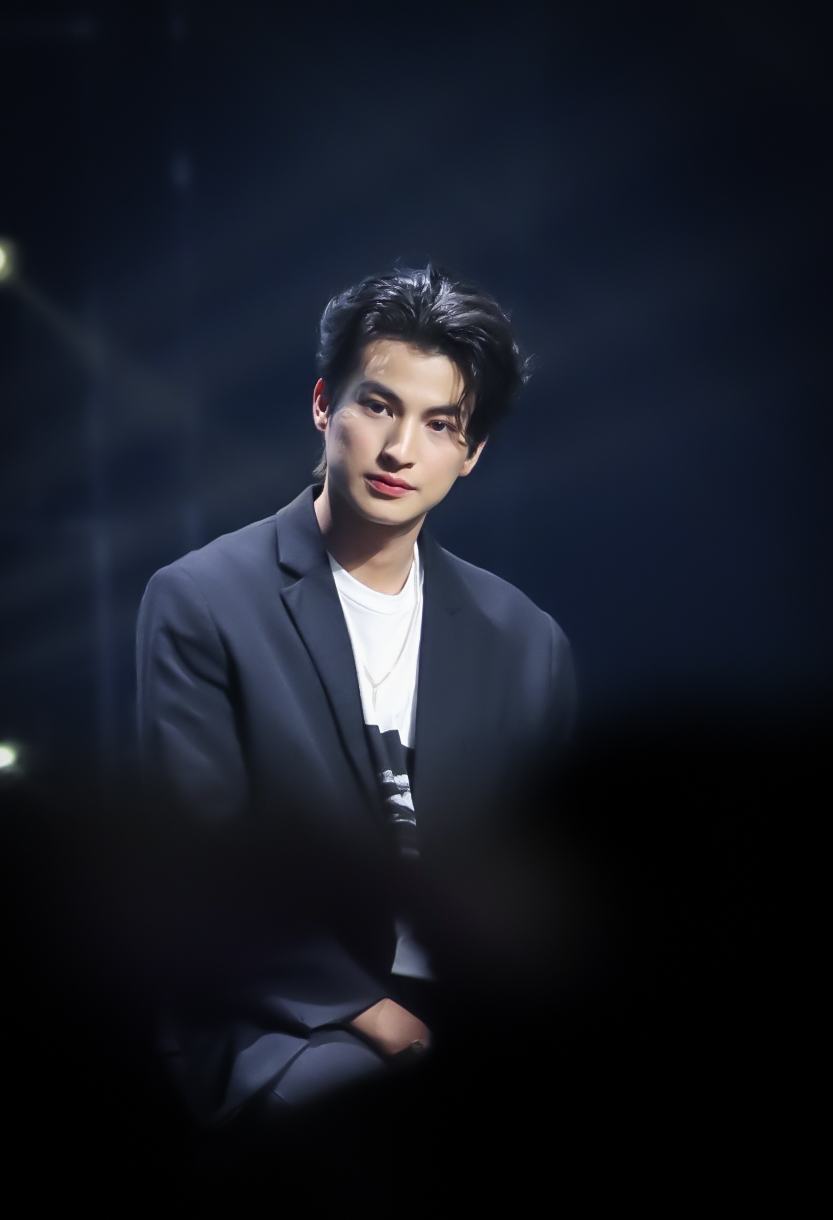
- Kanawut in 2021
- Born: Nattharin Traipipattanapong ณัฐรินทร์ ไตรพิพัฒนพงษ์ 4 December 1997 (age 28); Bangkok, Thailand
- Other name: Gulf
- Education: King Mongkut's University of Technology Thonburi
- Occupations: Actor; singer
- Years active: 2015–present
- Agent: Channel 3 HD (2021–present)
- Notable work: "Type" -Tharntype: The Series, "Phuthanet Juthathep" - Duangjai Dhewaprom: Laorchan
- Height: 185 cm (6 ft 1 in)
- Musical career
- Genres: Thai Pop; Hip-Hop
- Instrument: Vocals
- Years active: 2021–present
- Label: Channel 3
- Website: gulfkanawutofc.com

Kanawut Traipipattanapong (Thai: คณาวุฒิ ไตรพิพัฒนพงษ์, RTGS: Khanawut Traiphiphatthanaphong; born 4 December 1997), nicknamed Gulf (Thai: กลัฟ), is a Thai actor He is best known for his performances in the television series TharnType (2019–2021), the film Buaphan Fan Yap (2022) and the lakorn Duangjai Dhevaprom: Laorchan (2024).

== Early life and education ==
Gulf was born on 4 December 1997 in Bangkok, Thailand. He is the youngest child of the family and has one older sister. He completed his primary education at Buranasuksa School and secondary education at Suankularb Wittayalai School. In November 2020, he graduated from King Mongkut's University of Technology Thonburi with a bachelor's degree in industrial education and technology.

== Career ==
=== 2015–2018 ===
In 2015, at the age of 17, Gulf's debut as a television actor, he starred as Young Tee, a guest role in one of Channel 3's lakorn, Mafia Luerd Mungkorn: Singha. He took hiatus from acting to concentrate on his education.

Gulf took on small modelling opportunities and featured for few Thailand based local clothing brands. He had his first runway walk on tenth anniversary celebration of a Thai brand, Wonder Anatomie.

=== 2019–2020 ===
In January 2019, Gulf was announced to cast as "Type", one of the main protagonist of One 31 and Line TV's TharnType. The series gained popularity in national and international market. As per Dek-D official, the series has overall 3.8M views.

In February 2020, the sequel TharnType 2: 7 Years of Love was announced. Gulf reprised his role in the series. In November 2020, it got premiered via One 31 and Line TV. He received multiple awards for his role including "Rising Star" and "Best Young Actor" awards.

In August 2020, Gulf joined a project named Boyfriends led by record label GMM Grammy. On 20 October 2020, he release his first single named "Missing Baby" along with his colleague, Wanarat Ratsameerat.

=== 2021–present ===
In 2021 Gulf made various appearances in music videos of Thai singers including VYRA and Polycat. He also appeared in Kingkhom, a short film which promoted Garena Free Fire Thailand along with Kom Chuanchuen, a famous Thai comedian who died due to COVID-19 prior to the release.

In March 2021 he was officially announced and got signed as an actor/artist by Channel 3.

In 2022 Gulf starred as "Gut" in You are my Markup Artist, dramatization of a novel written by ‘Natepaktra’ of same name, alongside Janie Tienphosuwan. It was well received by the audience.

In the same year he made his movie debut when he starred as "Kham" in Bua Pun Fun Yub, a light hearted romantic comedy, alongside Anne Thongprasom, which garnered appreciation and entered the ฿ 100M club in Thailand.

In 2024, he starred in the long-awaited lakorn Duangjai Dhevaprom as the lead actor for its first series, Laorchan, and made guest appearances in its 4 subsequent series. The lakorn was well received by the Thai audience and his character 'Khun Phu' gained him wide popularity.

In 2025 Gulf made history as the first Thai actor to play the lead role in a Japanese drama as he starred alongside Japanese actress Miori Takimoto in the TV Tokyo series Tokyo Holiday.

In 2025 he also filmed his second movie Onethong alongside Mark Prin and Ink Waruntorn. It will premiere on June 3rd, 2026.

In December 2025 Gulf’s new lakorn called Tawan Luang (Beneath The Lies) was announced. He will play the role of Pakhorn, one of the leads, alongside Ch3 actors Yaya Urassaya and Kao Noppakao. The lakorn will start filming in early 2026 and is expected to air on the same year.

== Endorsements ==
Gulf is a renowned celebrity in the fields of fashion and entertainment. In 2020, he received his first solo cover photo shoot for L'Officiel Thailand and since then has appeared on numerous magazine covers.

Throughout his career, Gulf has been part of campaigns for various luxury brands. Since February 2023, he has frequently attended Milan Fashion week in Italy. Currently he is Brand Ambassador for Gucci and Onitsuka Tiger and Face of Sulwhasoo Thailand, amongst others.

In November 2023, he was invited to the MTV Video Music Awards Japan to present an award and perform.

As of September 2025, he has over 5M followers on Instagram.

== Filmography ==
=== Film ===
Year	Title	Role	Notes	Ref.
2022	Buaphan Fan Yap	Kham	Main	
2026	OneThong	Khun Chang	Main	

=== Television ===
Year	Title	Role	Notes	Network	Ref.
2015	Mafia Luerd Mungkorn: Singha	Tee	Guest	Channel 3	
2019	TharnType:	Type	Main	One 31	
2019	TharnType Special: Lhong's Story	Type	Main	One 31	
2020	Why R U?	Type	Guest	One 31	
2020	TharnType Special: Our Final Love	Type	Main	One 31	
2020	TharnType 2: 7 Years of Love	Type	Main	One 31	
2022	You Are My Makeup Artist	Gat Rattakorn	Main	Channel 3	
2024	Duangjai Dhevaprom: Laorchan	M.L. Phuthanet Juthathep / Khun Phu	Main	Channel 3	
2025	Tokyo Holiday	Arthit	Main	TV Tokyo	
2026	Beneath The Lies	Pakhorn	Main	Channel 3	

=== Variety shows and documentaries ===
Year	Title	Category	Network	Ref.
2019	คุยแซ่บShow	Talk Show	One 31	
2019	Khun Pra Chuay	Variety Show	Workpoint	
2020	เปรี้ยวปาก	Variety Show	Channel 3	
2020	ห้องballroom	Sports News	TNA MCOT	
2020	ตัวแม่มาแล้ว	Talk Show	Thairat TV	
2020	เอกกี้ซอย31	Talk Show	One 31	
2020	เที่ยวหาเรื่อง	Variety Show	MCOT HD	
2020	My Boyfriend Calls Me Baby	Talk Show	Viu	
2020	คู่มันส์ Funday	Variety Show	True Visions	
2020	Entertainment Now	TV Program	Mono29	
2020	WOODY SHOW	Talk Show	Channel 7	
2020	NineEntertain	TV Program	MCOT	
2020	4 ต่อ 4 Family Game	Game Show	One 31	
2021	โหนกระแส	Talk Show	Channel 3	
2021	3 แซบ	Talk Show	Channel 3	
2021	KINGKHOM โคตรพยัคฆ์หยุดแผนล้างโลก	Variety Show	by Garena Free Fire Thailand	
2021	Gulf: The Backstage	Documentary	Channel 3	

== Discography ==
=== Concerts ===
Year	Title	Notes	Ref.
2023	Gulf Phenomenon	F. Hero, Bright Vachirawit Chivaaree & Gulf	

=== Music video appearances ===
Year	Song	Artist	Ref.
2017	"เรื่องจริงทำไม่ได้"	POOM KickKick	
2020	"ต้องไป"	IRONBOY	
2021	"Self Love"	POLYCAT	
2021	"ต๊ะต่อนยอน...Hurry Up!"	VYRA (feat. Sunnee)	
2021	"ทุกวันได้ไหม"	NUM KALA Feat. Thongchai McIntyre	
2022	"Temperamental (เจ้าอารมณ์)"	Stamp Apiwat Ft. Paowalee	
2023	"จีบแบบไม่จีบ"	LADIIPRANG	
2024	"All To Myself"	Nene	

=== Collaborations ===
Year	Title	Notes	Ref
2020	"แฟนผมหาย (Missing Baby)"	with Wanarat Ratsameerat	
2021	"Self Love"	The Body Shop Thailand	
2021	"ชีวิตดี..เพราะมีเธอ"	Candy Thailand	
2021	"Can You Be My World"	Biodiversity Chm Thailand	
2021	"ตกลงเธอ...เลือกใคร"	Free Fire 4 FEST	
2021	"Why You So Serious"	feat. F.HERO Producers: Nino & Botcash	
2022	"Happy Love Day"	3Plus The Moment	
2023	"All I Ever Wanted"	Ballistik Boyz from Exile Tribe	
2023	"The Great Celebration"	with VIIS	
2024	“Congratulations (ยินดีกับเธอ)”	First official single	
2024	“ แค่เรา (Thủy Triều)”	with Quang Hùng MasterD	
2024	“WITH YOU”	feat. Lazyloxy	
2025	“It’s Go Time!”	with Miori Takimoto	

== Awards and nominations ==
Year	Award	Category	Nominated work	Result	Ref.
2020	Line TV Awards 2020	Best Kiss Scene	TharnType	Won	
2020	Kazz Awards 2020	Rising Star	TharnType	Won	
2020	Kazz Awards 2020	Popular rising actor	TharnType	Won	
2020	Kazz Awards 2020	Best Couple of the year	TharnType	Nominated	
2020	Kazz Awards 2020	Best scene	TharnType	Won	
2020	Howe Awards 2019	Best Couple	TharnType	Won	
2020	Thai Crazy Awards 2020	Best Couple	TharnType	Won	
2020	Maya Awards 2020	Best Couple	TharnType	Won	
2021	Yniverse Awards 2020	Moon of the Yniverse	TharnType	Won	
2021	Yniverse Awards 2020	ICONIC STAR of the Yniverse		Won	
2021	Kazz Awards 2021	Attractive young man of the year		Won	
2021	Maya Awards 2021	Best Couple	TharnType	Nominated	
2021	Thairath_Ent	Best Couple of the Year	—	Won	
2021	3rd Zoomdara Awards	Zoomdara of the year		Nominated	
2022	Maya Entertain Awards 2022	Charming boy		Nominated	
2022	Maya Entertain Awards 2022	Popular Vote		Nominated	
2022	Kazz Awards 2022	Popular Male teenage		Nominated	
2022	10th Thailand Zocial Awards	Best Entertainment on Social Media - Actor		Nominated	
2023	JAPAN EXPO THAILAND AWARD 2023	Japan Expo Media & Influencer Award (Male)		Won	
2023	MAYA TV Awards 2023	Best Leading Actor (Movies)		Won	
2024	HOWE Awards 2024	HOWE The Best Actor Award		Won	
2024	Daily News Awards	D-Rising Star		Won	
2024	Lifestyle Asia (LSA) 50 Icons 2024	Most Influential Person of the Year		Won	
2025	Kazz Awards 2025	Outstanding Actor of the Year		Won	
2025	Weibo Gala 2025	Most Outstanding Young Actor		Won	
2025	Thailand Headlines Person of the Year Award 2025	Most Popular Thai Star Among Chinese		Won	
