= Faculty of Political Science, Chulalongkorn University =

- คณะรัฐศาสตร์ จุฬาลงกรณ์มหาวิทยาลัย
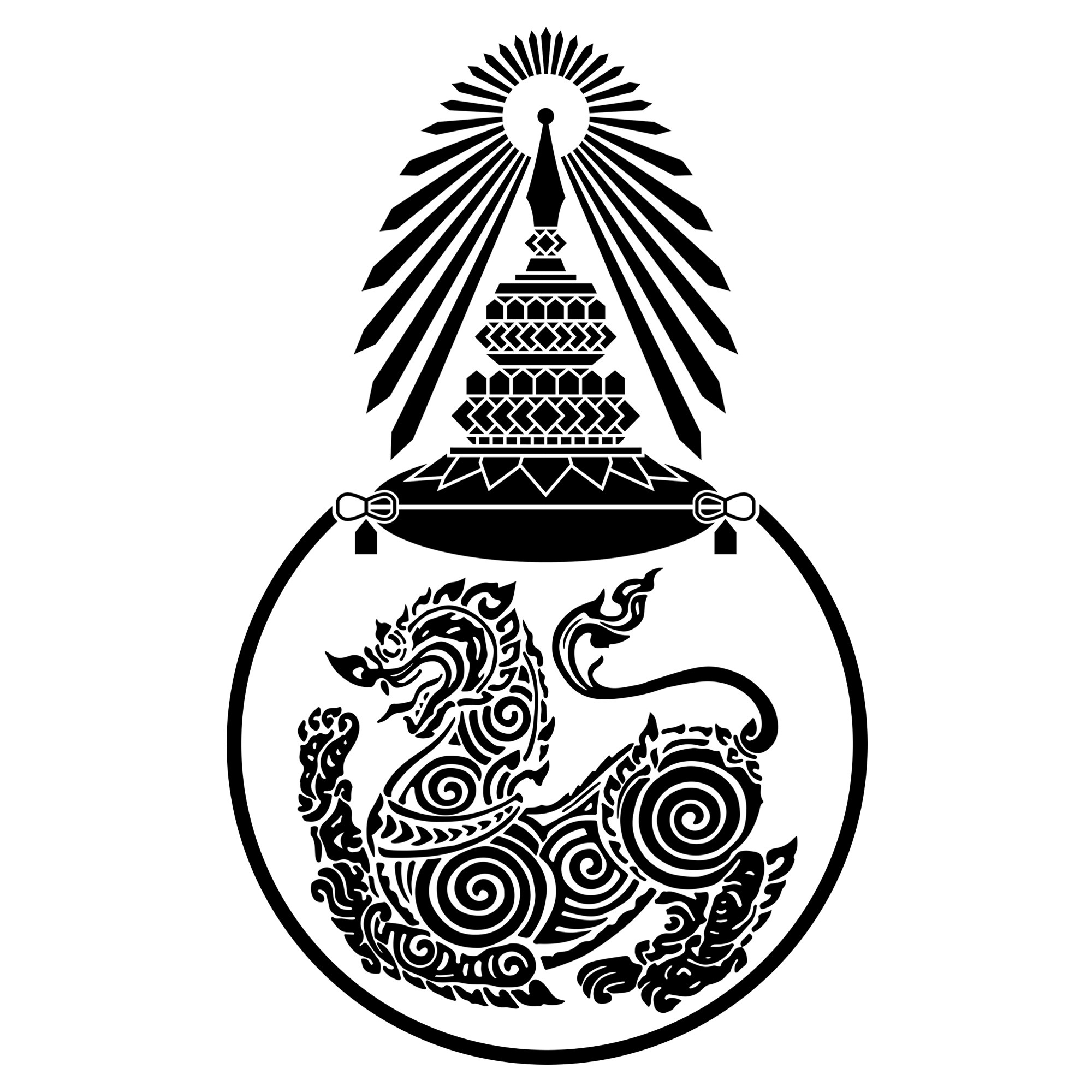
- Type: Public
- Established: originally 1899, re-established 1948 (113 years old)
- Parent institution: Chulalongkorn University
- Dean: Assoc. Prof. Dr. Prakorn Siriprakob, PhD
- Location: Henri Dunant Road, Pathum Wan, Pathum Wan, Bangkok 10330 Thailand
- Campus: Metropolis
- Colors: Black
- Mascot: Black Singha (a mythical lion in the Himmapan or Himmavanta forest)
- Website: www.polsci.chula.ac.th

The Faculty of Political Science, Chulalongkorn University (Thai: คณะรัฐศาสตร์ จุฬาลงกรณ์มหาวิทยาลัย), is regarded as one of the oldest modern higher education institutions in Thailand. It is the first faculty of political science in Thailand and is considered one of the best according to the statistics of student who had highest score on admission system chose to study there for 4 years in a row (2010–2013). It is also one of Thailand's leading institutions for political science training. Many senior government officials, politicians, diplomats and prominent academics are the graduates of the Faculty. Due to its logo and colour, the Faculty, students and its graduates are also called by the nickname, "Singh Dam" (Black Singha).

== History ==
The Faculty of Political Science was originally established in 1899 as the School of Civil Servant Training by King Chulalongkorn. Students were selected from those who passed basic educational training and would be educated about public administration in the school. They were also required to do internship in different governmental agencies after completion and received certificate for specialised skill afterwards. This school had expanded and its graduates mostly worked as royal page which allowed these young men to be close to the central authority and became accustomed to senior officials. As a general practice during that time, new government officials would start their career at the Department of Royal Pages before being promoted to work in other departments. Therefore, King Chulalongkorn renamed the School to the Royal Pages School to reflect this reality in 1902.

In 1910, King Vajiravudh viewed that training new graduates to work for the Ministry of Interior was not sufficient for increasing public services in other areas; therefore, he ordered and financially supported the expansion of the Royal Pages School to include many areas of trainings. The School was renamed again to "The Civil Service College of King Chulalongkorn" on 1 January 1910. The general curriculum was four-year training of which the first three were for general education leaving the last year for internship. However, the School was upgraded and renamed Chulalongkorn University on 26 March 1916. The newly established Chulalongkorn University was then administered in 4 faculties, that is, the Faculty of Medicine, the Faculty of Engineering, the Faculty of Arts and Science, and the Faculty of Public Administration.

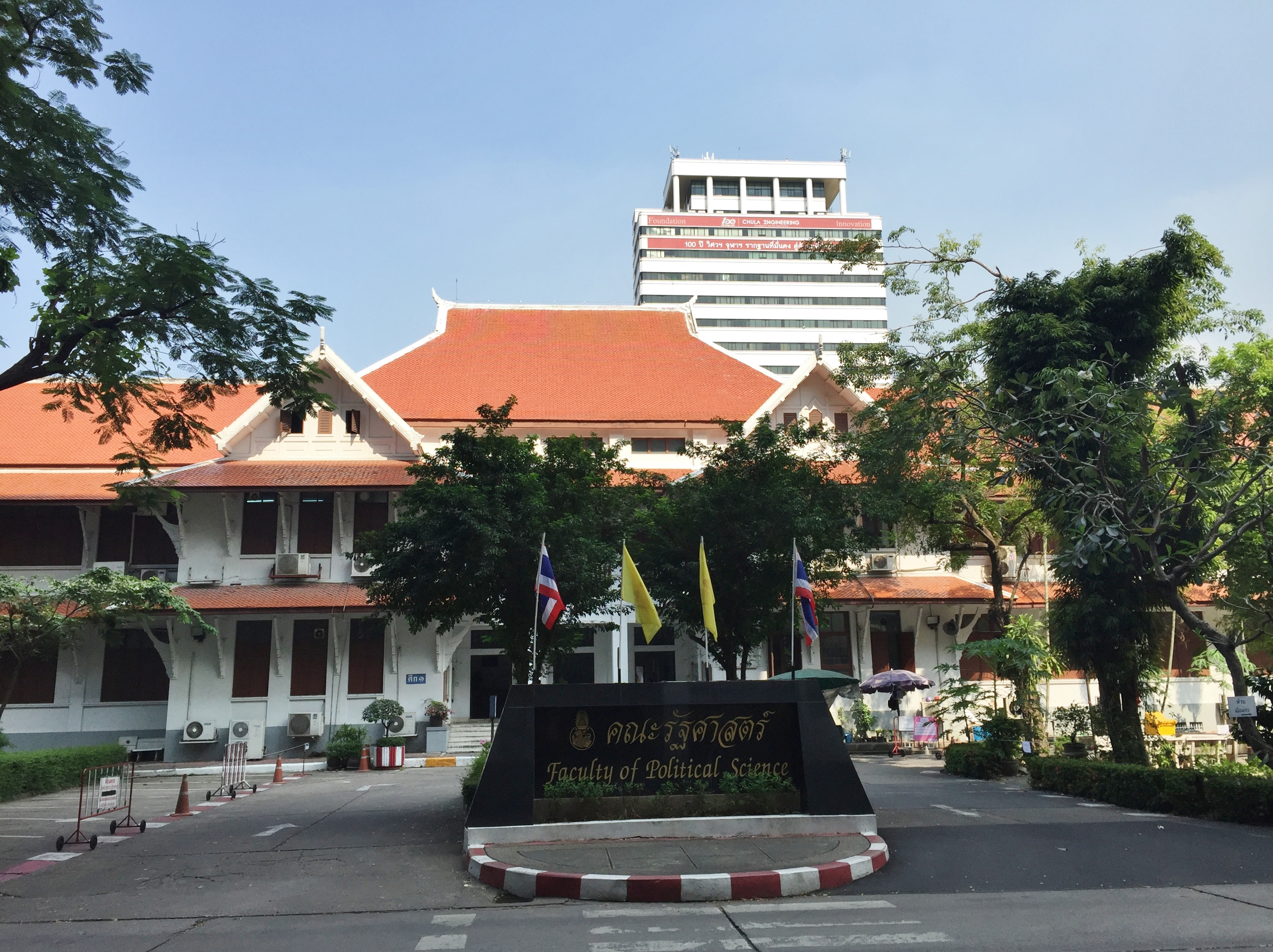
Samranraj Borirak Building, the first building of the faculty

In 1929 after the promulgation of the new Civil Service Act the popularity of the Faculty of Public Administration decreased significantly. The Act did not require applicants to hold university qualification to apply for first level entry of public service. Holders of ordinary secondary school certificate (equivalent to Grade 11) could also enter to the same level, while the students choosing to enter the Faculty had to pass advanced secondary certificate (equivalent to Grade 12) plus 3 years at the university before starting their career. The nadir of its popularity could be seen by only 35 students enrolling in that year. Therefore, the Ministry of Education proposed to King Prajadhipok to discontinue the Faculty after the completion of its last class. The King initially endorsed the proposal. However, many government officials especially from the Ministry of Interior appealed to the King to reconsider his decision as they still saw the necessity and usefulness of producing graduates in this field. The committee for reconsidering this issue was set up and finally agreed that the Faculty should be continued on the proviso that its admission and curriculum must be revamped. The name of the Faculty was changed to the School of Civil Service and directly overseen by the Office of the President of Chulalongkorn University. In 1933, the Law School of the Ministry of Justice was incorporated into the School, thereafter renamed together the "Faculty of Law and Political Science".

Following the collapse of the absolute monarchy in 1932, the University of Moral and Political Science (later called Thammasat University) was established. Then, the Faculty of Law and Political Science of Chulalongkorn University was transferred to be under this new university. The Faculty of Law and Political Science was therefore temporarily disappeared from Chulalongkorn University's academic structure.

In 1948, the government viewed that there was still need for more graduates for public administration, then agreed to re-establish the Faculty of Political Science in Chulalongkorn University in that same year. The new phase of the Faculty of Political Science then began and has progressively developed until today.

The then Faculty of Political Science comprised 3 divisions, that is, Political Science Division, Public Finance Division, and Law Division. Later on, Public Finance Division was merged with Economics Division of the Faculty of Commerce and Accountancy to become the Faculty of Economics in 1971. Also, Law Division was upgraded to the Faculty of Law in 1972. After these splits, the Faculty has mainly focused in teaching modern political science discipline.

== Academic Administration ==
Currently, the Faculty of Political Science organises its academic disciplines into 4 departments, that is,
1. Department of Government
2. Department of International Relations
3. Department of Public Administration
4. Department of Sociology and Anthropology

The Faculty offers undergraduate (BA) and postgraduate degrees (MA, MPA and PhD), including an international master programme in International Development Studies taught in English.

There are also a number of research centres under the Faculty including Policy and Management Development Institute (PMDI), Institute of Security and International Studies (ISIS), Public Enterprise Institute (PEI), Centre for Social Development Studies (CSDS), Institute of Local Government Initiatives (ILGI), and Thai Politics Research Centre (TPRC).

The Faculty has also run a prominent academic journal namely Journal of Social Science for over 35 years. The published articles are both written in Thai and English.

== Degree Programmes ==
Department	Bachelor Degree	Master Degree	Doctoral Degree
Department of Government	Bachelor of Arts in Political Science: Government	Master of Arts in Political Science: Government; Politics and Governance	Doctor of Philosophy: Political Science
Department of International Relations	Bachelor of Arts in Political Sciences: International Relations	Master of Arts in Political Science: International Relations (MAIR)	Doctor of Philosophy: Political Science
Department of Public Administration	Bachelor of Arts in Political Science: Public Administration	Master of Public Administration: Public Administration (MPA)	Doctor of Philosophy: Political Science
Department of Sociology and Anthropology	Bachelor of Arts in Political Science: Sociology and Anthropology	Master of Arts: Sociology and Anthropology; Criminology and Justice Administration	Doctor of Philosophy: Sociology and Anthropology; Criminology and Criminal Justice
International Programme	Bachelor of Arts in Politics and Global Studies (International Dual-Degree Programme) Partnership – University of Essex, United Kingdom – University of Queensland, Australia	Master of Arts: International Development Studies (International Program) (MAIDS); Governance (International Programme)

== Logo ==
The black singha is used as a symbol of the dedicated leader. The black colour symbolises the colour of the neck of Shiva who drinks the poison churned up from the world ocean (Halahala) to protect and save all creatures. (In fact, the actual colour of Shiva's neck in Hindu mythology is deeply dark blue or "nila". That's why one of his names is Nilakantha or "having a blue-coloured neck". However, "nila" in Thai (normally pronounced "nin") becomes a simply black colour). Singha is a mythical animal that rules the Himmapan forest representing the great ruler or leader. These symbolic meanings convey the fact that the Faculty aims at producing qualified graduates who will be leading figures in the society in any respect with passion and dedication to help improve people's quality of life as their foremost principle.
