= Noppakao Dechaphatthanakun =

Thai actor, model and singer (born 1994)

- นพเก้า เดชาพัฒนคุณ
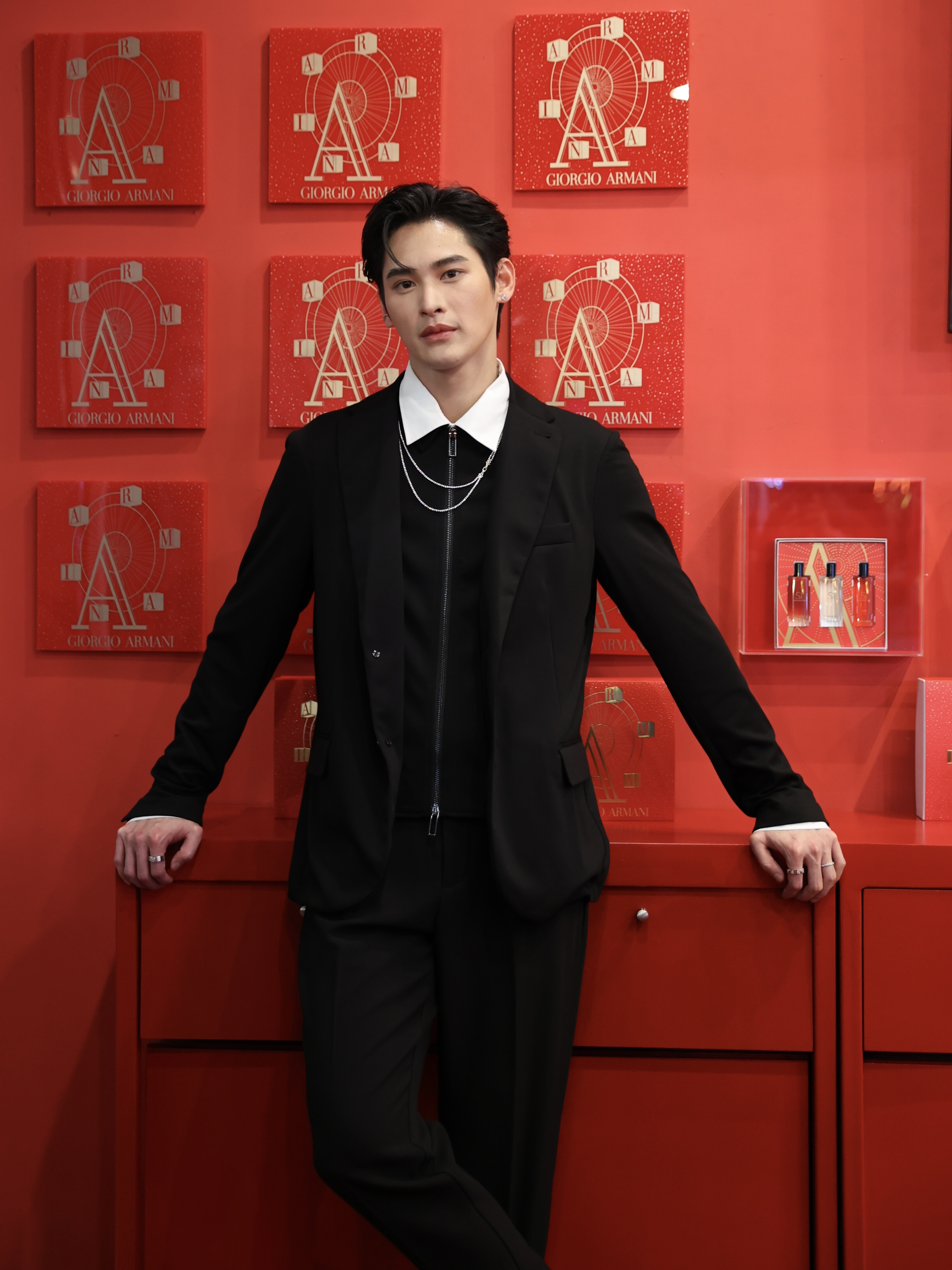
- Noppakao in November 2022
- Born: 9 September 1994 (age 32); Phayao, Thailand
- Other name: Kao (เก้า)
- Education: Rangsit University
- Occupations: Actor; singer
- Years active: 2018–present
- Agent: Channel 3 HD (2021–present)
- Notable work: Until We Meet Again (TV series) (2019); Lovely Writer (2021); Duangjai Dhevaprom (2024)
- Height: 1.83 m (6 ft 0 in)

Noppakao Dechaphatthanakun (Thai: นพเก้า เดชาพัฒนคุณ; born 9 September 1994), nicknamed Kao (Thai: เก้า), is a Thai actor, and singer. He is currently signed under Channel 3. He is best known for his roles in Until We Meet Again (2019), Lovely Writer (2021), and Duangjai Dhevaprom (2024).

== Early life and education ==
Noppakao Dechaphatthanakun was born on September 9, 1994, at 9 a.m., in the delivery room number 9, hence the nickname Kao (Thai: 9, เก้า), in Phayao, Thailand. He is an only child. He studied for a bachelor's degree at Rangsit University in the Faculty of Communication Arts, and is currently studying Master of Business Administration.

== Career ==
=== Acting ===
In 2018, Noppakao began to enter the entertainment industry through auditions. He was well known during "2MoonsAudition" to be an actor in 2Moons: The Series. However, he didn't pass the audition. He made his debut in the same year as a support role Athida in Sapai Ka Fak, which was aired on Channel 3.

In 2019, Noppakao was cast as Korn Ariyasakul in Until We Meet Again and his popularity continued to grow rapidly after the series was aired.

In 2021, he was paired with Poompat Iam-samang in a new BL series Lovely Writer. The series was adapted from a novel and it was aired on Channel 3. Later, the series was released on Channel 3 YouTube. The series ended with a great feedback from the audience.

In December 2021, it was reported that Noppakao signed a contract with Channel 3.

In 2024, he starred in the big project of Channel 3, together with Punpreedee Khumprom Rodsaward, in the Duangjai Dhevaprom series, which consists of 5 consecutive series, Laorchan, Kwanruetai, Jaiphisut, Dujapsorn and Poncheewan.

As a leading actor in Poncheewan, his name became well known, since the series gained popularity nationwide. Poncheewan achieved a record-breaking performance, and set the new highest audience ratings on Channel 3, both in Bangkok and Nationwide. All episodes of Poncheewan were number one trending on X in Thailand. The Episode 8 and 11 were number one trending on X worldwide. The final episode was number two trending on X worldwide. The series was well received by Thai audience and his character gained him wide popularity.

=== Music ===
In 2020, Noppakao joined a special project called "BOYFRIEND" and it was led by the record label GMM Grammy. On October 6, 2020, he released his first single "คิดได้ (Too Little, Too Late)" with Sapol Assawamunkong under the "BOYFRIEND" project.

In 2022, he released another single called “ไหวอยู่ (แต่ก็รู้สึก) I'm ok”, which was a cover of the original version by Anuwat Sae-Jow.

== Filmography ==
=== Film ===
Year	Title	Role	Notes	Ref.
2014	Summer to Winter		Bit part	
TBA	Follow	Way	Main role	

=== Television ===
Year	Title	Role	Notes	Channel
2018	Sapai Ka Fak	Athida	Support role	Channel 3
2019	Until We Meet Again	Korn Ariyasakul	Main role	LINE TV
2021	Lovely Writer	Nubsib / "Sib"	Main role	Channel 3
2024	Duangjai Taewaprom	M.L. Saruj Juthathep	Main role	Channel 3
TBA	Before Sunset	Tawan	Main role	Channel 3

== Discography ==
Year	Title	Notes	Ref.
2019	โชคดีแค่ไหน Ost.Until We Meet Again	with the cast of Until We Meet Again	
2020	คิดได้ (Too little, Too late)	with Sapol Assawamunkong	
2022	ไหวอยู่ (แต่ก็รู้สึก) I'm ok	Original by First Anuwat	
2024	อย่าปล่อยมือ (ดวงใจเทวพรหม Sports day)	Group performance	

== Music video appearances ==
Year	Title	Artist	Ref.
2022	"เสียอาการ (Why?)"	Babe'y	
2025	"You Like Me Too?"	THX	

== Awards and nominations ==
Year	Award	Category	Result
2021	Siam Series Awards 2021	Popular Couple (with Poompat Iam–samang)	Nominated
2021	Zoomdara Awards 2021	Best Couple (with Poompat Iam–samang)	Won
2024	Nine Entertain Awards 2024	Couple of the Year (with Punpreedee Khumprom Rodsaward)	Nominated
2024	Daily News Awards 2024	Couple of the Year (with Punpreedee Khumprom Rodsaward)	Nominated
2024	Line Today Poll of the Year 2024	Best Actor of the Year 2024	Won
2025	HITZ100Countdown	Hitz Couple (with Punpreedee Khumprom Rodsaward)	Won
2025	Komchadluek Awards	Most Popular Actor	TBA
2025	Nine Entertain Awards 2025	Couple of the Year (with Punpreedee Khumprom Rodsaward)	TBA
