= Punpreedee Khumprom Rodsaward =

Thai actress (born 1999)

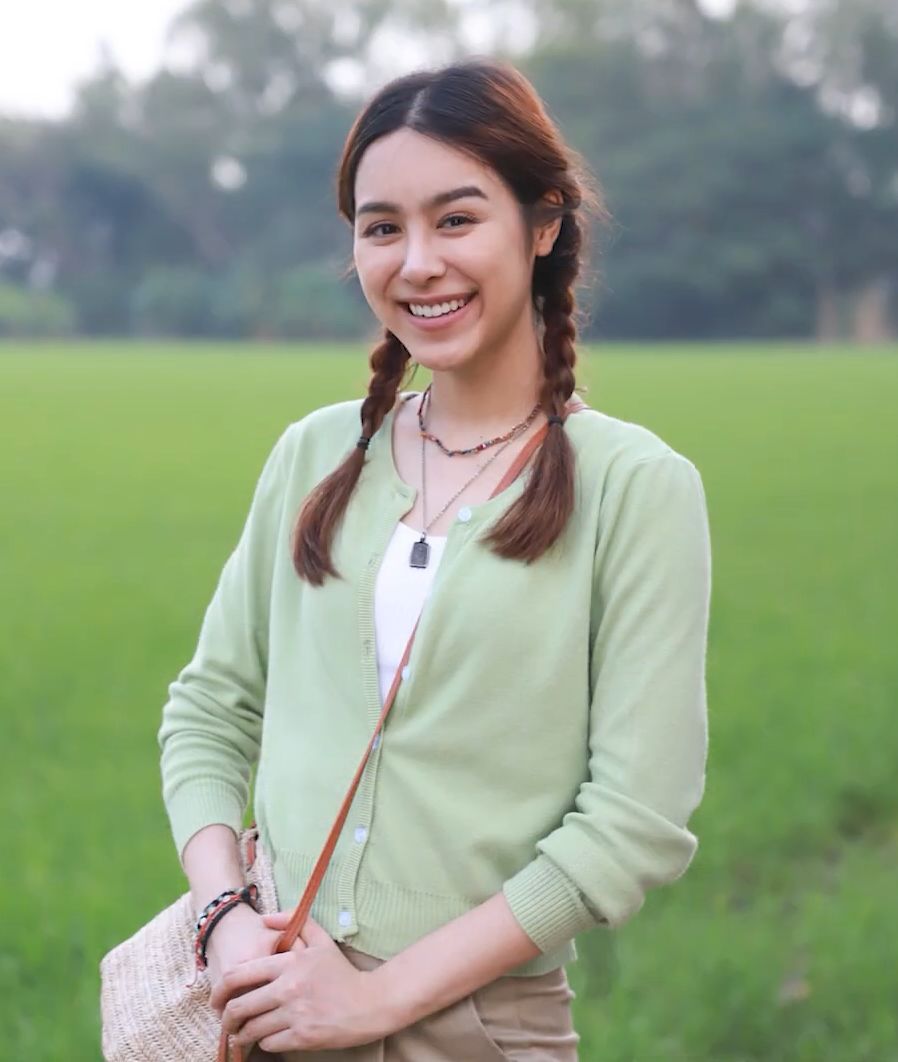
- Punpreedee in 2023
- Born: January 14, 1999 (age 27); Bangkok, Thailand
- Other name: พีพี
- Education: Faculty of Political Science, Chulalongkorn University
- Occupations: Actor; Host
- Years active: 2022–present
- Agent: Channel 3 HD (2020–present)
- Height: 165 cm (5 ft 5 in)

Punpreedee Khumprom Rodsaward (Thai: ปุญญ์ปรีดี คุ้มพร้อม รอดสวาสดิ์; Born 14 January 1999) was a Thai actress and host under Channel 3 HD. She is known for her role as Mae Prang from Love Destiny 2 and Chiwan from the drama series Duangjai Dhevaprom episode "Porncheewan".

== Biography ==
Punpreedee Kumprom Rodsaward was born on January 14, 1999. Her family is from Surat Thani Province. Descended from Khun Chaweng Wararak (Chey), the first governor of Koh Samui. Punpreedee is the youngest of three siblings: one older brother, Preedeewat Kumprom Rodsaward, and one older sister, Second Lieutenant Punyapalee Kumprom Rodsaward. Her family is in the real estate business. Punpreedee is a Theravada Buddhist. In terms of education, she completed her secondary education at Yothinburana School and earned a bachelor's degree in Sociology and Anthropology from the Faculty of Political Science, Chulalongkorn University. During her student days, she represented the Faculty of Political Science in the Miss Star Contest, Class of '70. She was also a cheerleader for the Faculty of Political Science, Chulalongkorn University.

== Career ==
Punpreedee started her career in the entertainment industry by filming commercials until she signed a contract to become an actor under Channel 3 in 2021, starting as a host on the program. Then, she had her first drama broadcast as a BL series called The Miracle of Teddy Bear (คุณหมีปาฏิหาริย์) in 2022, playing the role of Pribpri. In the same year, she also starred in two dramas: Poisonous Passion (ปมเสน่หา), playing the role of Prim, and Bad Romeo (คือเธอ) playing the role of Yam Som, the girlfriend of Kaokla, the hero of the story, who secretly runs off to marry another man.

Later in 2023, she played the role of Soi Dao in the drama Interlocking Hearts on Chao Phraya (เลือดเจ้าพระยา). Followed by the pre-news drama You're My Universe (รักสุดใจยัยตัวแสบ).
