= Nuttapart Tuntistinchai =

Thai actor

- ณัฐภัทร ตันติสถิรชัย
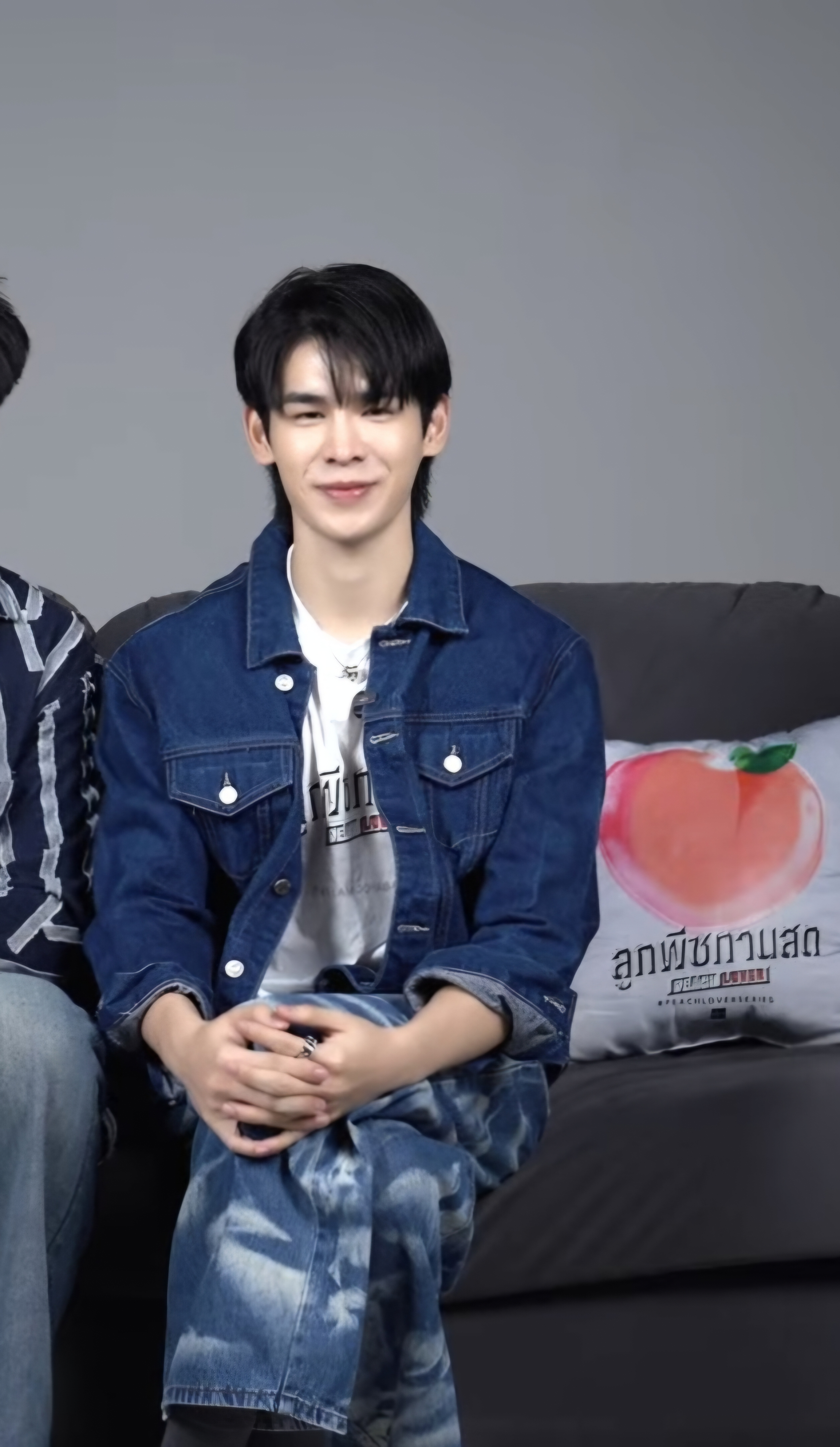
- Poom in February 2026
- Born: Nuttapart Tuntistinchai; Suphan Buri, Thailand
- Other name: Poom (ภูมิ)
- Occupation: Actor
- Years active: 2019–present
- Agent: Idol Factory

Nuttapart Tuntistinchai (Thai: ณัฐภัทร ตันติสถิรชัย), also known as Poom (ภูมิ), is a Thai actor. He is best known for starring in the BL series My Sweetheart Jom (2025) and Peach Lover (2026). He also appeared in productions such as The Sign (2023), The Loyal Pin (2024) and Dream (2024).

== Biography ==
Nuttapart was born in Suphan Buri, Thailand. After graduating from Kannasoot Suksalai School, he studied at the College of Social Communication Innovation at Srinakharinwirot University. He is signed under Idol Factory.

In 2025, he starred in My Sweetheart Jom alongside Saint Suppapong, broadcast on Workpoint channel. In 2026, he played Po in Peach Lover, an iQIYI original production.

He also appeared in The Sign (2023), playing Thongthai, and in Dream (2024) as Pat. In 2024, he acted in The Loyal Pin as Pranot.

== Filmography ==
=== Television ===
Year	Title	Episodes	Role	Type
2026	Peach Lover	10	Po	Main
2025	My Sweetheart Jom	12	Yothin / "Yo"	Main
2024	The Loyal Pin	16	Pranot	Supporting
2024	Dream	12	Pat	Supporting
2023	The Sign	12	"Thongthai" Phathorn Phlengthai	Supporting

=== Television programs ===
Year	Title	Episodes	Role	Type
2025	Good Bye	Ep. 20	Guest	Appearance
2024	You Sure Me Tour	Ep. 2–3	Guest	Appearance
2024	Behind the Dream	Ep. 2	Himself	Appearance
2023	Behind the Sign	12	Himself	Supporting
2023	The Sign Special	1	Himself	Supporting
2021	T-Pop Stage Show	Ep. 147	Guest	Appearance
2020	The Wall Song	Ep. 248	Guest	Appearance
2020	SosatSeoulsay	Ep. 218, 232	Guest	Appearance
2019	Who Is My Chef	Ep. 331	Guest	Appearance
