= Suppapong Udomkaewkanjana =

Thai actor, producer and host (born 1998)

- ศุภพงษ์ อุดมแก้วกาญจนา
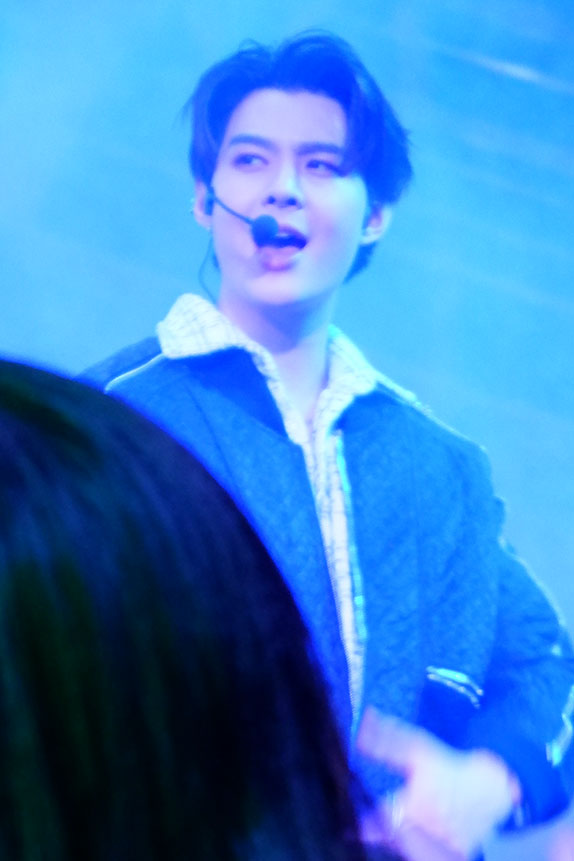
- Suppapong in 2021
- Born: 17 April 1998 (age 28); Trat, Thailand
- Education: Srinakharinwirot University (BEc)
- Occupations: Actor; MC; Producer
- Years active: 2016–present
- Agent: Channel 3 (2022-present)
- Notable work: Pete in Love by Chance; Tutor in Why R U?; Aof in Let’s Fight Ghost

Suppapong Udomkaewkanjana (Thai: ศุภพงษ์ อุดมแก้วกาญจนา; born 17 April 1998), nicknamed Saint, is a Thai actor, producer and host. He gained fame through his role as Pete (Pichaya) in the 2018 TV series Love by Chance and as Tutor in the TV series Why R U? (2020).

== Early life and education ==
Suppapong was born on 17 April 1998 in Trat, Thailand. He was given the Chinese name Huang Mingming (Chinese: 黄明明; pinyin: Huáng Míngmíng) by his great-grandfather. He completed his secondary education at Trat Trakarnkhun School in Trat Province (Lower Secondary) and Assumption College in Bangkok (Upper Secondary). He later pursued his higher education at Srinakharinwirot University (SWU), where he earned two degrees:

- Bachelor’s Degree: Bachelor of Economics (International Trade), Faculty of Economics.
- Master’s Degree: Master of Arts (Design for Business), College of Social Communication Innovation.

Since his childhood, Suppapong has been highly recognized for his dedication to public service and community activities. He began his volunteer work in the 4th grade as a member of the "Jetana Pongsai" group, which provided manual labor and assistance to local temples in Trat Province. He continued to serve as a staff member for Dhamma practice programs until completing his lower secondary education.

During his early teens, he took on leadership roles as the president and core leader of the TO BE NUMBER ONE club at his school. For two consecutive years, he was awarded certificates of merit by Princess Ubolratana Rajakanya for organizing various drug prevention projects and serving as a guest speaker on cycling to encourage youths to spend their free time productively and stay away from narcotics.

In high school, Suppapong moved to Bangkok and joined Rotary International District 3350. He served as the president of the "Better Life for Children" volunteer camp and was a committee member for several social initiatives, including Conference 31, "Arsa Pa Nong Len" (Volunteers Taking Children to Play), and the "Pet We Care" project. Due to his extensive contributions to society, he was honored with the "People of Siam Thep Nakharat" Award in 2017 for Outstanding Youth in Social Service and received the Good Conduct Award from the Buddhist Association of Thailand under Royal Patronage in 2018.

== Career ==
Early Career and Breakthrough (2018–2021) Suppapong entered the entertainment industry in 2018 and achieved rapid success through his leading role as "Pete" in the series Love By Chance, which gained him significant international recognition. In 2019, he expanded his career into music with his debut single "Thook Jai Khon Nee" and became a member of the KissBoysTH project. Between 2019 and 2020, Suppapong starred in several series, notably Why R U The Series and a high-profile guest role as "Chananthawat" (the male version of Nira) in the hit drama The Fallen Leaf. Beyond acting, he ventured into entrepreneurship by launching the snack brand "Saan Suk" and established IDOL FACTORY Co., Ltd. in 2020 to produce television programs and series.

Producer Roles and Soft Power Advocacy (2022–2025) In 2022, Suppapong signed an exclusive contract as an actor under Channel 3 HD, with a standout role as "Mom Luang Ronaphum Juthathep" in the Duangjai Taewaprom series. Simultaneously, as a producer, he made history in the Thai entertainment industry by producing GAP The Series, Thailand's first Girl's Love (GL) series, which achieved global acclaim.

Following this success, Suppapong was appointed in 2023 as a Sub-committee Member for the Promotion of the Drama and Series Industry under the National Soft Power Development Committee. In 2025, he represented his company at the Cannes Film Festival 2025, engaging in international trade negotiations to promote Thai content globally.

On November 19, 2025, Suppapong officially announced his resignation from the Board of Directors of IDOL FACTORY Co., Ltd., and terminated his role as an artist and actor under the company.

== Filmography ==
=== As executive producer ===
Year	Title	Network	Ref.
2022	Secret Crush On You	Channel 3 (Thailand), YouTube	
2022	Gap	Channel 3 (Thailand), YouTube	
2023	The Sign	Channel 3 (Thailand), YouTube	
2024	My Marvellous Dream is You	Channel 3 (Thailand), YouTube	
2024	The Loyal Pin	Workpoint TV, YouTube	
2025	My Sweetheart Jom	Workpoint TV, YouTube	
2025	Somewhere Somehow	Workpoint TV, YouTube	
2025	Interminable	Workpoint TV, YouTube	

=== Film ===
Year	Title	Role	Notes	Film Studio	Ref.
2020	Von The Movie (Begging You)	Ohm	Main	M39	
2023	Death Is All Around	Tank	Main	Pranakorn Film	

=== Television series ===
Year	Title	Role	Role Types	Network	Ref.
2018	Love by Chance	Pete	Main		
2019	Reminders	Son	Main	Line TV	
2019	2 Brothers	Pat - The true grandson	Guest	GMM 25, Line TV	
2019	Bai Mai Tee Plid Plew (The Leaves)	Chananawat – Nira (Young)	Guest	One31, Line TV, Netflix	
2019	My Love From Another Star	Somchai - [Classmate]	Guest	Channel 3 (Thailand), Line TV, MELLO	
2020	TharnType	Pete - Pichaya	Guest	One 31, Line TV	
2020	TharnType Special: Our Final Love	Pete - Pichaya	Guest	Vimeo	
2020	Why R U?	Tutor - Sattakhun	Main	One 31, Line TV	
2020	Love by Chance 2: A Chance to Love	Pete - Pichaya	Flashback	Tencent Video	
2021	Let's Fight Ghost	Aof - Issawa Promvithi	Main	True Asian Series, True4U, Netflix	
2021	Mae Krua Kon Mai (My Mischievous Flancee)	Max	Guest	Channel 3 (Thailand)	
2022	Secret Crush On You	Thep (Senior University)	Guest	Channel 3 (Thailand), YouTube	
2022	Sing Again	Sol (Twin brother)	Main	TrueVisions, Netflix	
2022	School Tales The Series	Boy	Main	Netflix	
2022	Gap	Khun Phoom	Guest	Channel 3 (Thailand)	
2024	The sign	Shakunathicharut	Guest	Channel 3 (Thailand)	
2024	Duangjai Dhevaprom: Laorchan	Plt. Off. / Flg. Off. / Flt. Lt. / Sqn. Ldr., M.L. Ronnaphoom Juthathep / Khun Phoom	Supporting	Channel 3 (Thailand)	
2024	Duangjai Dhevaprom: Jaiphisut	Plt. Off. / Flg. Off. / Flt. Lt. / Sqn. Ldr., M.L. Ronnaphoom Juthathep / Khun Phoom	Supporting	Channel 3 (Thailand)	
2024	Duangjai Dhevaprom: Dujapsorn	Plt. Off. / Flg. Off. / Flt. Lt. / Sqn. Ldr., M.L. Ronnaphoom Juthathep / Khun Phoom	Main	Channel 3 (Thailand)	
2024	Duangjai Dhevaprom: Porncheewan	Plt. Off. / Flg. Off. / Flt. Lt. / Sqn. Ldr., M.L. Ronnaphoom Juthathep / Khun Phoom	Main	Channel 3 (Thailand)	
2025	My Sweetheart Jom	Jom	Main	Workpoint TV	
2025	Happiness	Prat	Main	TrueVisions, Netflix	
2026	Love Life Balance	Yuan	Main	Channel 3 (Thailand)	

=== Music video appearances ===
Year	Song title	Artist	Notes	Ref.
2018	"นา นา นา"	Boy Sompob	Love By Chance OST	
2019	"TRUTH or DARE"	Thanasit Jaturaput		
2020	"นี่คือรักใช่ไหม"	Jarinya Sirimongkolsakul (Kaew) X Visava Thaiyanont (Tomo)	Why R U? OST	
2022	"Innocent"	Dusita Kitisarakulchai (Natherine)		
2022	"ตั้งใจมารักข้างเดียวอยู่แล้ว"	TEE JETS		

== Discography ==
Year	Song title	English Title	Note	Ref.
2019	"เพิ่งได้รู้"	"Just Know"	Kissboys TH	
2019	"ดีต่อใจ"	"Good to Heart"	Kissboys TH	
2019	"ถูกใจคนนี้"	"I Crush on You"		
2019	"องครักษ์"	"Ongkharak"	Srinakharinwirot University Ongkharak Campus Music	
2019	"ขอบคุณฟ้าที่ให้ฉันพบเธอ"	"Angels Brought Me Here"		
2020	"รักใช่หรือเปล่า?"	"Is This Love?"	Featuring with Issara Kitnitchi Why R U? OST	
2020	"ความรู้สึกที่เปลี่ยน"	"Feelings Change"	Why R U? OST	
2020	"ได้พบกัน"	"To Meet You"		
2020	"รักให้ถึงที่สุด"	"Try"	Let's Fight Ghost OST	
2021	"ผิดไหมที่ฉันไม่กลับไปรักเธอ"	"Is It Wrong That I Won't Return to Loving You?"	Call Me By Your Song Project	
2021	"แอบหลงรัก"	"Secret Crush On You"	Featuring with Saranyu Winaipanit Secret Crush On You OST	
2022	"ไม่ไหวแล้ว"	"My Universe"	Featuring with Ravisrarat Pibulpanuvat OST Sing Again	
2023	"Marry Me"	"Marry Me"	Gap The Series OST	
2023	"Uoo Hoo"	"Uoo Hoo"		

== Hosting ==
=== Television ===
Year	Title	Type	Network	Air time	Ref.
2021	T-POP STAGE	Music Program	Workpoint TV	5 July 2021 – 26 July 2021	
2021	T-POP STAGE SHOW	Music Program	Workpoint TV	4 September 2021 – present	

=== Online ===
Year	Title	Type	Network	Air time	Ref.
2021	SOS สัญญาณส่งความสุข	Travel Program	IDOLFACTORY	8 March 2021 – present	
2021	Saintsup	Vlog	Saintsup TV	15 May 2021 – present	

== Awards and nominations ==
Year	Award	Category	Result	Nominated work	Ref.
2019	2nd Line TV Awards	Best Couple (with Tanapon Sukumpantanasan)	Won	Love by Chance: The Series	
2019	2nd Line TV Awards	Best Kiss Scene (with Tanapon Sukumpantanasan)	Won	Love by Chance: The Series	
2019	13th Kazz Awards	Young people of the year 2018	Won	—N/a	
2019	13th Kazz Awards	Popular Vote 2019	Nominated	—N/a	
2019	13th Kazz Awards	Male Rising Star 2019	Won	Love by Chance: The Series	
2019	13th Kazz Awards	Best Couple of the Year (with Tanapon Sukumpantanasan)	Nominated	Love by Chance: The Series	
2019	Daradaily Awards 8	Male Rising Star of the year 2018	Nominated	Love by Chance: The Series	
2020	16th Kom Chad Luek Awards	Most Popular actor	Nominated	Love by Chance: The Series	
2020	14th Kazz Awards	Young people of the year 2019	Won	—N/a	
2020	14th Kazz Awards	Popular Vote 2020	Won	—N/a	
2020	14th Kazz Awards	Most Popular Teen Actor 2020	Nominated	—N/a	
2020	6th Maya Awards	Best Couple (with Pruk Panich)	Nominated	Why R U?: The Series	
2020	Zoom Dara Awards & Showcase 2020	Best Couple (with Pruk Panich)	Won	Why R U?: The Series	
2021	Weibo Starlight Awards 2020 (China)	Xing Yao Hall of Fame (Singapore, Malaysia, Thailand area)	Won	—N/a	
2021	Line TV Awards 2021	Best Couple (with Pruk Panich)	Nominated	Why R U?: The Series	
2021	15th Kazz Awards	Top Actor Award 2021	Won	—N/a	
2021	15th Kazz Awards	Popular Couple of the Year (with Patchanan Jiajirachote)	Nominated	Let's Fight Ghost	
2021	Howe Awards 2020	New Generation	Won	—N/a	
2021	7th Maya Awards	Male Rising Star	Nominated	Let's Fight Ghost	
2021	Siam Series Awards 2021	Top Actor Award	Nominated	Let's Fight Ghost	
2024	Lifestyle Asia Thailand 50 ICONS	Entrepreneur	Won	—N/a	
