= T-Pop Stage Show =

Television program

- Also known as: T-POP Stage
- Genre: Music
- Presented by: Teeratee Buddeehong, Suppapong Udomkaewkanjana
- Country of origin: Thailand
- Original language: Thai
- No. of seasons: 2
- No. of episodes: 52

Production
- Production location: Workpoint Studio
- Running time: 60 minutes
- Production companies: Workpoint Entertainment; TPOP Incorporation

Original release
- Network: Workpoint TV
- Release: 8 February 2021 – present

T-POP Stage Show (Thai: ที-ป็อปสเตจโชว์), formerly known as T-POP Stage (Thai: ที-ป็อปสเตจ), is a Thai music program broadcast by Workpoint. It airs live every Saturday at 21:30 ICT. The show features some of the latest and most popular artists who perform on stage. It is broadcast from Workpoint Studio in Bang Phun, Mueang Pathum Thani, Pathum Thani.

== Hosts ==
Date	Host
T-Pop Stage
8 February – 5 April 2021	Teeratee Buddeehong, Suppasit Jongcheveevat
5 – 26 July 2021	Teeratee Buddeehong, Suppapong Udomkaewkanjana
T-Pop Stage Show
4 September 2021 – present	Teeratee Buddeehong, Suppapong Udomkaewkanjana

== T-pop Weekly Chart ==
Music chart ranking "T-Pop Weekly Chart" formerly known as "T-Pop Top Chart" has the following conditions:

1. Music on the chart must not be soundtracks for movies, dramas, series, commercials, and sitcoms.
2. A song stays on the chart for 4 weeks and is adjusted weekly.
3. Scoring to rank songs calculate the total score for each week. By dividing the weight of the score into 100% according to the proportions.

Period covered	Chart system
8 – 22 February 2021	YouTube Music video Views (50%), Facebook Poll (35%), Spotify Audio streaming (15%)
27 February – 2 August 2021	YouTube Music video Views (60%), Facebook Poll (20%), Spotify Audio streaming (20%)
26 August 2021 – present	YouTube Music video Views (50%), Application Poll (25%), Spotify Audio streaming (25%)

=== Awards ===
- Music of the week for the highest score song each week.
- Rookie of the week for the highest score debut song each week.
- OST of the week for the highest score OST song each week.

==== Winners ====
Key
	Quadruple winners
	Highest score of the year
—	Not announced

===== 2021 =====
List of Winners

Episode	Weekly	Date	Music			Rookie			OST			Ref.
Episode	Weekly	Date	Artist	Song	Points	Artist	Song	Points	Artist	Song	Points	Ref.
T-Pop Stage
1 (Note: Episode 1 Opening Stage is the opening of the show. And the first weekly awards were announced.)	0	8 February	Three Man Down	"Tah Tur Ruk Chun Jing"	12,179.01	Not announced			—N/a			
2	1	15 February	Mew Suppasit	"GOOD DAY"	18,418.53	4EVE	"Oohlala!"	3,742.07	—N/a			
3	2	22 February	Mew Suppasit	"GOOD DAY"	18,792.12	Pimrypie	"Ya Na Ka"	2,603.96	—N/a			
4	3	1 March	Anatomy Rabbit	"Extraordinary"	14,744.84	Pimrypie	"Ya Na Ka"	3,002.22	—N/a			
5	4	8 March	Three Man Down	"Dao Mai Keng"	13,887.91	Mark Methathavach	"Still Care"	3,043.55	—N/a			
6	5	15 March	F.Hero Feat. Bright Vachirawit	"SAD MOVIE"	10,580.69	Mona	"Tik Tok Boom"	1,612.00	—N/a			
7	6	22 March	Mew Suppasit	"THANOS"	12,778.10	Yin War	"Aon Mai Keng"	2,869.65	—N/a			
8	7	29 March	Txrbo Feat. Pearwah Nichaphat	"Lie"	10,520.69	Yin War	"Aon Mai Keng"	2,717.86	—N/a			
9	8	5 April	Tangbadvoice Feat. Billkin Putthipong	"Kid Mai Aok"	13,888.49	Arena	"Come Get It Now"	4,172.06	—N/a			
10 (Note: Episode 10 to Episode 15 aired a Special Summer. It is a compilation of performances that have already been broadcast again due to COVID-19 pandemic.)	9	12 April	JSPKK Feat. Aed Carabao	"JAZZADD"	18,315.28	Thammachad Feat. Artymilk, Avarest, Turk TK, Hypesompobbk and Tswar	"Khun Phu Chom"	7,259.74	—N/a			
11	10	19 April	JSPKK Feat. Aed Carabao	"JAZZADD"	7,738.39	Arena	"Come Get It Now"	907.04	—N/a			
12	11	26 April	4EVE	"TEST ME"	8,643.57	Bamm	"2cool2care"	715.18	—N/a			
13	12	3 May	Maiyarap Feat. Three Man Down	"Gep Wai Nai Jai Mai Por"	5,177.65	Bamm	"2cool2care"	842.39	—N/a			
14	13	10 May	Sprite Feat. Guygeegee	"Thon"	4,762.29	Lee Thanat	"WHY?"	806.17	—N/a			
15	14	17 May	Sprite Feat. Guygeegee	"Thon"	5,117.00	Lee Thanat	"WHY?"	621.76	—N/a			
16 (Note: Episode 16 brings Episode 1 to air again due to COVID-19 pandemic.)	15	24 May	Sprite Feat. Guygeegee	"Thon"	8,545.80	Lee Thanat	"WHY?"	317.24	—N/a			
17 (Note: Episode 17 brings Episode 2 to air again due to COVID-19 pandemic.)	16	31 May	Sprite Feat. Guygeegee	"Thon"	6,212.80	Peach You	"I Peach U"	160.20	—N/a			
18 (Note: Episode 18 brings Episode 5 to air again due to COVID-19 pandemic.)	17	7 June	P-Hot Feat. Sprite	"Kiaw Pha Ra See"	6,622.33	Pop Up	"I'm Strong"	480.71	—N/a			
19 (Note: Episode 19 brings Episode 7 to air again due to COVID-19 pandemic.)	18	14 June	P-Hot Feat. Sprite	"Kiaw Pha Ra See"	8,717.13	Pop Up	"I'm Strong"	215.97	—N/a			
20 (Note: Episode 20 brings Episode 9 to air again due to COVID-19 pandemic.)	19 (Note: Weekly 19, In the first calculation Music of the week was P-Hot's "Kiaw Pha Ra See" with 4,140.35 points. And Rookie of the week was Pop Up's "I'm Strong" with 256.36 points.)	21 June	P-Hot Feat. Sprite	"Kiaw Pha Ra See"	7,307.44	Kyutae Oppa	"Mai Tong Plop Jai Dai Mai"	331.46	—N/a			
21 (Note: Episode 21 brings Episode 8 to air again due to COVID-19 pandemic.)	20	28 June	Mew Suppasit	"Summer Fireworks"	17,180.60	Pop Up	"I'm Strong"	192.56	—N/a			
22 (Note: Unable to broadcast live due to the COVID-19 pandemic.)	21	5 July	Mew Suppasit	"Summer Fireworks"	16,587.36	Bright Vachirawit	"Unmovable"	11,300.75	—N/a			
23	22	12 July	Sprite	"Bang Orn"	12,713.66	Bright Vachirawit	"Unmovable"	6,005.89	—N/a			
24	23	19 July	Sprite	"Bang Orn"	15,631.78	Bright Vachirawit	"Unmovable"	3,897.29	—N/a			
25	24	26 July	Sprite	"Bang Orn"	12,233.96	Bright Vachirawit	"Unmovable"	3,457.75	—N/a			
–	25 (Note: Announcing the results that are open for voting before the broadcast end.)	2 August	Sprite	"Bang Orn"	9,485.82	Perth Tanapon	"Jeb Won Pai"	3,514.26	—N/a			
T-Pop Stage Show
1	1 (Note: Formerly broadcast on September 2, 2021, voting will be open from August 26, 2021.)	4 September	PP Krit	"It's Okay Not To Be Alright"	35,163.76	PP Krit	"It's Okay Not To Be Alright"	35,163.76	Not announced			
2	2	11 September	Meyou	"Pattaya"	20,075.93	PP Krit	"It's Okay Not To Be Alright"	20,056.47	Not announced			
3	3	18 September	Billkin Putthipong	"IXO"	24,506.95	PP Krit	"It's Okay Not To Be Alright"	13,876.92	Not announced			
4	4	25 September	Billkin Putthipong	"IXO"	22,674.83	PP Krit	"It's Okay Not To Be Alright"	14,694.19	Not announced			
5	5	2 October	Billkin Putthipong	"IXO"	20,948.63	Tay Tawan	"Invisible Tears"	3,524.62	Nont Tanont	"Phing" OST. Krachao Seeda	8,011.67	
6	6	9 October	Nont Tanont	"Phing" OST. Krachao Seeda	23,002.65	Tay Tawan	"Invisible Tears"	3,572.29	Nont Tanont	"Phing" OST. Krachao Seeda	23,002.65	
7	7	16 October	Nont Tanont	"Phing" OST. Krachao Seeda	28,159.05	Tay Tawan	"Invisible Tears"	4,325.31	Nont Tanont	"Phing" OST. Krachao Seeda	28,159.05	
8	8	23 October	Nont Tanont	"Phing" OST. Krachao Seeda	26,835.83	Hybs	"Ride"	4,885.18	Nont Tanont	"Phing" OST. Krachao Seeda	26,835.83	
9	9	30 October	Mew Suppasit	"SPACEMAN"	24,548.35	Hybs	"Ride"	7,900.23	Not announced			
10	10	6 November	F.Hero Feat. Milli and Changbin	"Mirror Mirror"	40,000.00	HRK Feat. Tony Gospel	"Jai Phuk...Jeb"	4,918.62	Not announced			
11	11	14 November	F.Hero Feat. Milli and Changbin	"Mirror Mirror"	40,000.00	HRK Feat. Tony Gospel	"Jai Phuk...Jeb"	6,561.33	Not announced			
12	12	20 November	F.Hero Feat. Milli and Changbin	"Mirror Mirror"	30,325.87	HRK Feat. Tony Gospel	"Jai Phuk...Jeb"	4,797.54	Not announced			
13	13	27 November	F.Hero Feat. Milli and Changbin	"Mirror Mirror"	29,913.23	HRK Feat. Tony Gospel	"Jai Phuk...Jeb"	3,878.77	Not announced			
14	14	4 December	Peper	"Thong Fa"	22,116.57	Kinkaworn	"love u 1m"	2,256.52	Ice Saranyu	"Secret Crush On You" OST. Secret Crush On You	5,304.51	
15	15	11 December	Peper	"Thong Fa"	22,132.21	Kinkaworn	"love u 1m"	4,770.77	Not announced			
16	16	18 December	Trinity	"LIFE AIN'T OVER"	32,854.25	Atlas	"MAYDAY MAYDAY"	8,665.88	Taitosmith Feat. D Gerrard	"Nak Leng Kao" OST. 4KINGS	19,745.50	
17	17 (Note: Christmas Special Episode)	25 December	Taitosmith Feat. D Gerrard	"Nak Leng Kao" OST. 4KINGS	22,024.03	Atlas	"MAYDAY MAYDAY"	2,323.69	Taitosmith Feat. D Gerrard	"Nak Leng Kao" OST. 4KINGS	22,024.03	

===== 2022 =====
Episode	Weekly	Date	Music			Rookie			OST			Ref.
Episode	Weekly	Date	Artist	Song	Points	Artist	Song	Points	Artist	Song	Points	Ref.
18	18 (Note: New Year Special Episode)	1 January	Mew Suppasit Feat. Sam Kim	"Before 4:30 (She Said...)"	28,404.35	Monica	"WONDER"	1,748.28	Bright Vachirawit Feat. Win Metawin, Dew Jirawat and Nani Hirunkit	"Who am I" OST. F4 Thailand: Boys Over Flowers	6,525.11	
19	19	8 January	Mew Suppasit Feat. Sam Kim	"Before 4:30 (She Said...)"	38,545.44	Atlas	"MAYDAY MAYDAY"	7,528.60	Bright Vachirawit Feat. Win Metawin, Dew Jirawat and Nani Hirunkit	"Who am I" OST. F4 Thailand: Boys Over Flowers	9,881.90	
20	20	15 January	Mew Suppasit Feat. Sam Kim	"Before 4:30 (She Said...)"	27,808.88	Art Marut	"Khong Tay Thee Yang Hay Jai"	3,445.76	Bright Vachirawit Feat. Win Metawin, Dew Jirawat and Nani Hirunkit	"Who am I" OST. F4 Thailand: Boys Over Flowers	11,507.79	
21	21	22 January	Mew Suppasit Feat. Sam Kim	"Before 4:30 (She Said...)"	26,332.46	Art Marut	"Khong Tay Thee Yang Hay Jai"	593.94	Bright Vachirawit Feat. Win Metawin, Dew Jirawat and Nani Hirunkit	"Shooting Star" OST. F4 Thailand: Boys Over Flowers	6,707.23	
22	22	29 January	Illslick	"Phiphitthaphan"	20,096.22	Taew Natapohn Feat. Gavin.D	"BABYBOO"	5,971.88	Bright Vachirawit Feat. Win Metawin, Dew Jirawat and Nani Hirunkit	"Shooting Star" OST. F4 Thailand: Boys Over Flowers	12,169.55	
23	23	5 February	Illslick	"Phiphitthaphan"	20,104.05	Taew Natapohn Feat. Gavin.D	"BABYBOO"	2,444.15	Nanon Korapat	"OUR SONG" OST. Bad Buddy Series	15,887.96	
24	24	12 February	PP Krit	"I'll Do It How You Like It"	22,627.59	Taew Natapohn Feat. Gavin.D	"BABYBOO"	1,170.96	Off Jumpol Feat. Gun Atthaphan	"MY SIDE" OST. Not Me	8,758.86	
25	25	19 February	Illslick	"Phiphitthaphan"	20,020.67	Celeste	"Skip a Beat"	1,076.62	Stamp Apiwat Feat. Violette Wautier	"Tha Thoe" OST. One for the Road	15,563.74	
26	26	26 February	PP Krit	"I'll Do It How You Like It"	27,597.66	Proo Thunwa	"UNSEND"	7,256.12	Nunew	"My Cutie Pie" OST. Cutie Pie	14,240.64	
27	27	5 March	PP Krit	"I'll Do It How You Like It"	22,355.02	Kin Thanachai	"Yoo Kon Deaw Mun Ngao"	20,542.76	Nunew	"My Cutie Pie" OST. Cutie Pie	12,950.29	
28	28	12 March	MILLI Feat. mints	"17 Mins"	20,851.00	Kin Thanachai	"Yoo Kon Deaw Mun Ngao"	7,277.10	Nunew	"My Cutie Pie" OST. Cutie Pie	15,092.66	
29	29	19 March	RachYO	"The Black Eyed"	20,702.93	Proo Thunwa	"UNSEND"	2,686.57	Nunew	"My Cutie Pie" OST. Cutie Pie	16,589.44	
30	30	26 March	Paper Planes "Feat. "MOON"	"Pretend"	26,878.35	Boom Saharat	"Tha Thoe Mai Dai Khit A Rai"	3,645.53	Nunew	"How You Feel" OST. Cutie Pie	17,788.51	
31	31	2 April	Paper Planes "Feat. "MOON"	"Pretend"	30,045.63	Boom Saharat	"Tha Thoe Mai Dai Khit A Rai"	2,645.20	Nunew	"How You Feel" OST. Cutie Pie	15,467.62	
32	32	9 April	Paper Planes "Feat. "MOON"	"Pretend"	30,063.34	Boom Saharat	"Tha Thoe Mai Dai Khit A Rai"	1,870.94	Nunew	"How You Feel" OST. Cutie Pie	15,234.63	
33	33	16 April	SARAN X maimhon	"I Can't Forget"	23,803.71	LAZ1	"TASTE ME"	16,674.61	Nunew	"How You Feel" OST. Cutie Pie	11,746.32	
34	34	23 April	SARAN X maimhon	"I Can't Forget"	24,271.25	LAZ1	"TASTE ME"	17,574.90	Lydia Sarunrat	"Don't Come Love Me" OST. Poison of the past	3,711.87	
35	35	30 April	F.Hero x VannDa Feat 1MILL Sprite	"Run The Town"	22,670.00	LAZ1	"TASTE ME"	14,682.69	Nat Natasit	"Alone" OST. Cutie Pie	16,140.31	
36	36	7 May	F.Hero x VannDa Feat 1MILL Sprite	"Run The Town"	23,081.00	LAZ1	"TASTE ME"	17,174.00	Nunew	"Be Yours" OST. Cutie Pie	22,463.00	
37	37	14 May	F.Hero x VannDa Feat 1MILL Sprite	"Run The Town"	22,451.11	NOEL(TATAM)	"DIOR"	3,462.91	Zee Pruk	"Always You" OST. Cutie Pie	24,357.50	
38	38	21 May	Atlas	"Mr. Lonely"	22,173.87	Proxie	"Crazy Love"	3,230.30	Jeff Satur	"Why Don't You Stay" OST. KinnPorsche	17,725.39	
39	39	28 May	No One Else	"Just having you walk and kick the ocean waves together"	28,280.73	Proxie	"Crazy Love"	3,256.81	Jeff Satur	"Why Don't You Stay" OST. KinnPorsche	22,262.91	
40	40	4 June	No One Else	"Just having you walk and kick the ocean waves together"	26,609.84	Kirana	"You cut my heart cuz you don't care my hair"	2,012.65	Jeff Satur	"Why Don't You Stay" OST. KinnPorsche	22,935.19	
41	41	11 June	Nont Tanont	"Melt"	25,461.94	Kirana	"You cut my heart cuz you don't care my hair"	2,226.39	Jeff Satur	"Why Don't You Stay" OST. KinnPorsche	25,929.53	
42	42	18 June	D Gerrard	"LUXURY"	24,401.82	Tytan feat. Loco	"All Night"	7,656.34	Zee Pruk & Nunew	"Baby Boo" OST. Cutie Pie	26,708.03	
43	43	25 June	D Gerrard	"LUXURY"	24,732.09	Tytan feat. Loco	"All Night"	3,048.60	Zee Pruk & Nunew	"Baby Boo" OST. Cutie Pie	19,137.85	
44	44	2 July	Joey Phuwasit	"Gold Face"	23,322.09	Tytan feat. Loco	"All Night"	2,176.94	Zee Pruk & Nunew	"Baby Boo" OST. Cutie Pie	18,435.76	
45	45	9 July	Joey Phuwasit	"Gold Face"	24,112.84	TheChanisara	"Hermionong"	12,100.35	Zee Pruk & Nunew	"Baby Boo" OST. Cutie Pie	19,698.88	
46	46	16 July	Joey Phuwasit	"Gold Face"	23,440	TheChanisara	"Hermionong"	15,586	Not announced			
47	47	23 July	สิงโต นำโชค ร่วมกับ โจ๊ก โซคูล	"ขวานบิ่น"	20,359.40	TheChanisara	"Hermionong"	18,673.41	Trinity	"My Princess" ประกอบ เจ้าหญิง 2022	9,574.88	
48	48	30 July	Billkin Putthipong	"ชอบตัวเองตอนอยู่กับเธอ"	27,110.19	TheChanisara	"Hermionong"	8,988.47	Trinity	"My Princess" ประกอบ เจ้าหญิง 2022	5,919.28	
49	49	6 August	Billkin Putthipong	"ชอบตัวเองตอนอยู่กับเธอ"	29,173.12	DIDI x DADA	"What are we?"	444.04	อิ๊งค์ วรันธร	"ถ้าเธอรักใครคนหนึ่ง" ประกอบ บุพเพสันนิวาส 2	8,035.69	
50	50	13 August	โบกี้ไลอ้อน	"recall"	30,086.69	DIDI x DADA	"What are we?"	320.46	อิ๊งค์ วรันธร	"ถ้าเธอรักใครคนหนึ่ง" ประกอบ บุพเพสันนิวาส 2	8,563.26	
51	51	20 August	โบกี้ไลอ้อน	"recall"	29,771.99	BowImm	"(Call Me!)"	1,810.83	Not announced			

== Achievements by artists ==
Top 10 Most winners

Rank	Artist	Count
1st	Mew Suppasit	10
2nd	Sprite	8
3rd	F.Hero	5
4th	PP Krit	4
5th	P-Hot	3
5th	Billkin Putthipong	3
5th	Nont Tanont	3
5th	Illslick	3
5th	Paper Planes	3
10th	Three Man Down	2
10th	JSPKK	2
10th	Paper	2

Top 10 Highest Scores in T-pop Charts (all time)

Rank	Artist	Song	Score	Date
1st	F.Hero Feat. Milli and Changbin	"Mirror Mirror"	40,000.00	6 November 2021
1st	F.Hero Feat. Milli and Changbin	"Mirror Mirror"	40,000.00	14 November 2021
3rd	Mew Suppasit Feat. Sam Kim	"Before 4:30 (She Said...)"	38,545.44	8 January 2022
4th	PP Krit	"It's Okay Not To Be Alright"	35,163.76	4 September 2021
5th	Trinity	"LIFE AIN'T OVER"	32,854.25	18 December 2021
6th	F.Hero Feat. Milli and Changbin	"Mirror Mirror"	30,325.87	20 November 2021
7th	Paper Planes "Feat. "MOON"	"Pretend"	30,063.34	9 April 2022
8th	Paper Planes "Feat. "MOON"	"Pretend"	30,045.63	2 April 2022
9th	F.Hero Feat. Milli and Changbin	"Mirror Mirror"	29,913.23	27 November 2021
10th	Mew Suppasit Feat. Sam Kim	"Before 4:30 (She Said...)"	28,404.35	1 January 2022

Top 10 Highest Scores in T-pop Top Chart (1st – 2nd system)

Rank	Artist	Song	Score	Date
1st	Mew Suppasit	"GOOD DAY"	18,792.12	22 February 2021
2nd	Mew Suppasit	"GOOD DAY"	18,418.53	15 February 2021
3rd	JSPKK Feat. Aed Carabao	"JAZZADD"	18,315.28	8 March 2021
4th	Mew Suppasit	"Summer Fireworks"	17,180.60	28 June 2021
5th	Anatomy Rabbit	"Extraordinary"	17,082.79	1 March 2021
6th	Mew Suppasit	"Summer Fireworks"	16,587.36	5 July 2021
7th	Sprite	"Bang Orn"	15,631.78	19 July 2021
8th	Tangbadvoice Feat. Billkin Putthipong	"Kid Mai Aok"	13,888.49	5 April 2021
9th	Three Man Down	"Dao Mai Keng"	13,887.91	8 March 2021
10th	Mew Suppasit	"THANOS"	12,778.10	22 March 2021

Top 10 Highest Scores in T-pop Weekly Chart (3rd system)

Rank	Artist	Song	Score	Date
1st	F.Hero Feat. Milli and Changbin	"Mirror Mirror"	40,000.00	6 November 2021
1st	F.Hero Feat. Milli and Changbin	"Mirror Mirror"	40,000.00	14 November 2021
3rd	Mew Suppasit Feat. Sam Kim	"Before 4:30 (She Said...)"	38,545.44	8 January 2022
4th	PP Krit	"It's Okay Not To Be Alright"	35,163.76	4 September 2021
5th	Trinity	"LIFE AIN'T OVER"	32,854.25	18 December 2021
6th	F.Hero Feat. Milli and Changbin	"Mirror Mirror"	30,325.87	20 November 2021
7th	Paper Planes "Feat. "MOON"	"Pretend"	30,063.34	9 April 2022
8th	Paper Planes "Feat. "MOON"	"Pretend"	30,045.63	2 April 2022
9th	F.Hero Feat. Milli and Changbin	"Mirror Mirror"	29,913.23	27 November 2021
10th	Mew Suppasit Feat. Sam Kim	"Before 4:30 (She Said...)"	28,404.35	1 January 2022

Top 10 Highest Scores Rookie in T-pop Charts (all time)

Rank	Artist	Song	Score	Date
1st	PP Krit	"It's Okay Not To Be Alright"	35,163.76	4 September 2021
2nd	Kin Thanachai	"Yoo Kon Deaw Mun Ngao"	20,542.76	5 March 2022
3rd	PP Krit	"It's Okay Not To Be Alright"	20,056.47	11 September 2021
4th	LAZ1	"TASTE ME"	17,574.90	23 April 2022
5th	LAZ1	"TASTE ME"	17,174.00	7 May 2022
6th	LAZ1	"TASTE ME"	16,674.61	16 April 2022
7th	TheChanisara	"Hermionong"	15,586	16 July 2022
8th	PP Krit	"It's Okay Not To Be Alright"	14,694.19	25 September 2021
9th	LAZ1	"TASTE ME"	14,682.69	30 April 2022
10th	PP Krit	"It's Okay Not To Be Alright"	13,876.92	18 September 2021

Top 10 Highest Scores Rookie in T-pop Top Chart (1st – 2nd system)

Rank	Artist	Song	Score	Date
1st	Bright Vachirawit	"Unmovable"	11,300.75	5 July 2021
2nd	Thammachad Feat. Artymilk, Avarest, Turk TK, Hypesompobbk and Tswar	"Khun Phu Chom"	7,259.74	12 April 2021
3rd	Bright Vachirawit	"Unmovable"	6,005.89	12 July 2021
4th	Arena	"Come Get It Now"	4,172.06	5 April 2021
5th	Bright Vachirawit	"Unmovable"	3,897.29	19 July 2021
6th	4EVE	"Oohlala!"	3,742.07	15 February 2021
7th	Perth Tanapon	"Jeb Won Pai"	3,514.26	2 August 2021
8th	Bright Vachirawit	"Unmovable"	3,457.75	26 July 2021
9th	Mark Methathavach	"Still Care"	3,043.55	12 April 2021
10th	Pimrypie	"Ya Na Ka"	3,002.22	1 March 2021

Top 10 Highest Scores Rookie in T-pop Weekly Chart (3rd system)

Rank	Artist	Song	Score	Date
1st	PP Krit	"It's Okay Not To Be Alright"	35,163.76	4 September 2021
2nd	Kin Thanachai	"Yoo Kon Deaw Mun Ngao"	20,542.76	5 March 2022
3rd	PP Krit	"It's Okay Not To Be Alright"	20,056.47	11 September 2021
4th	LAZ1	"TASTE ME"	17,574.90	23 April 2022
5th	LAZ1	"TASTE ME"	17,174.00	7 May 2022
6th	LAZ1	"TASTE ME"	16,674.61	16 April 2022
7th	TheChanisara	"Hermionong"	15,586	16 July 2022
8th	PP Krit	"It's Okay Not To Be Alright"	14,694.19	25 September 2021
9th	LAZ1	"TASTE ME"	14,682.69	30 April 2022
10th	PP Krit	"It's Okay Not To Be Alright"	13,876.92	18 September 2021

Top 10 Highest Scores OST in T-pop Weekly Chart (3rd system)

Rank	Artist	Song	OST	Score	Date
1st	Nont Tanont	"Phing"	Krachao Seeda	28,159.05	16 October 2021
2nd	Nont Tanont	"Phing"	Krachao Seeda	26,835.83	23 October 2021
3rd	Zee Pruk & Nunew	"Baby Boo"	Cutie Pie	26,708.03	18 June 2022
4th	Jeff Satur	"Why Don't You Stay"	KinnPorsche	25,929.53	11 June 2022
5th	Zee Pruk	"Always You"	Cutie Pie	24,357.50	14 May 2022
6th	Nont Tanont	"Phing"	Krachao Seeda	23,002.65	9 October 2021
7th	Jeff Satur	"Why Don't You Stay"	KinnPorsche	22,935.19	4 June 2022
8th	Nunew	"Be Yours"	Cutie Pie	22,463.00	7 May 2022
9th	Jeff Satur	"Why Don't You Stay"	KinnPorsche	22,262.91	28 May 2022
10th	Taitosmith Feat. D Gerrard	"Nak Leng Kao"	4KINGS	22,024.03	25 December 2021

=== Quadruple Winners ===
Top 10 Most Quadruple winners

Rank	Artist	Count
1st	Sprite	2
2nd	F.Hero	1
2nd	Mew Suppasit	1

List of Quadruple songs

No.	Artist	Song	Wins
2021
1	Sprite Feat. Guygeegee	"Thon"	10, 17, 24 and 31 May
2	Sprite	"Bang Orn"	12, 19, 26 July and 2 August
3	F.Hero Feat. Milli and Changbin	"Mirror Mirror"	6, 14, 20 and 27 November
2022
4	Mew Suppasit Feat. Sam Kim	"Before 4:30 (She Said...)"	1, 8, 15 and 22 January

List of Quadruple rookies

No.	Artist	Song	Wins
2021
1	Bright Vachirawit	"Unmovable"	5, 12, 19 and 26 July
2	PP Krit	"It's Okay Not To Be Alright"	4, 11, 18 and 25 September
3	HRK Feat. Tony Gospel	"Jai Phuk...Jeb"	6, 14, 20 and 27 November
2022
1	LAZ1	"TASTE ME"	16, 23, 30 April and 7 May

List of Quadruple OSTs

No.	Artist	Song	OST	Wins
2021
1	Nont Tanont	"Phing"	Krachao Seeda	2, 9, 16 and 23 October
2022
1	Nunew	"My Cutie Pie"	Cutie Pie	26 Feb, 5, 12 and 19 Mac
2	Nunew	"How You Feel"	Cutie Pie	26 Mac, 2, 9 and 16 April
3	Jeff Satur	"Why Don't You Stay"	KinnPorsche	21, 28 May, 4 and 11 Jun
4	Zee Pruk & Nunew	"Baby Boo"	Cutie Pie	18, 25 June, 2 and 9 July 2022
