= Suppasit Jongcheveevat =

Thai actor, model and singer (born 1991)

- ศุภศิษฏ์ จงชีวีวัฒน์
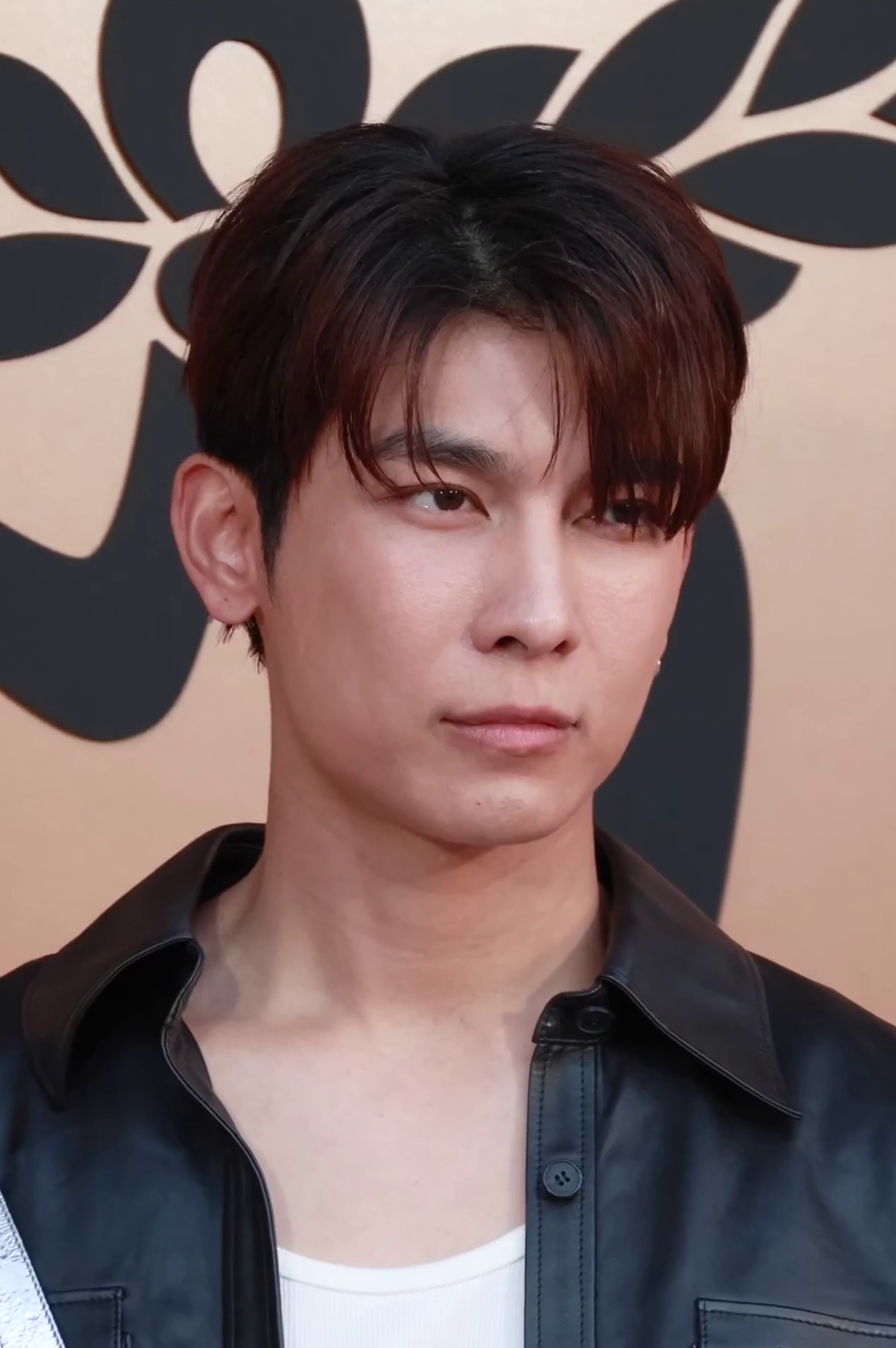
- Suppasit in September 2024
- Born: 21 February 1991 (age 35); Nonthaburi, Thailand
- Other name: Mew
- Occupations: Actor; singer; songwriter; producer; entrepreneur
- Years active: 2014–present
- Agent: Sol Skipper
- Notable work: Tharn in TharnType
- Height: 183 cm (6 ft 0 in)
- Partner(s): Tul Pakorn Thanasrivanitchai (2022 - present; engaged)
- Website: Official website

Suppasit Jongcheveevat (Thai: ศุภศิษฏ์ จงชีวีวัฒน์, RTGS: Supphasit Chongchiwiwat; born 21 February 1991), nicknamed Mew (Thai: มิว, RTGS: Mio), is an actor, singer-songwriter, producer and entrepreneur. He gained prominence for his lead role as Tharn in TharnType (2019-2020). Suppasit has also appeared in shows such as Love Hurts (2023), Love is Like a Cat (2024), Homeroom 29 Hostages (2025) and The Twin Gambit (2025).

In music, he debuted with the single "Season of You" in 2020 and released his first album titled 365 in 2021, becoming the first Thai artist to chart on Billboard's World Digital Song Sales with multiple entries in the top ten. He operates Sol Skipper and has co-founded businesses including a skincare brand, multiple cafes, an aesthetic clinic and a massage salon.

== Early life and education ==
Suppasit was born on 21 February 1991, in Nonthaburi, Thailand, to parents Boonsak and Suporn Jongcheveevat. He has a younger sister named Jomkwan Jongcheveevat.

He graduated secondary school from Kasetsart University Laboratory School. For his bachelor's degree, Suppasit studied at Kasetsart University, majoring in industrial engineering where he graduated with First-Class Honors. He continued to pursue his master's degree in industrial engineering at Chulalongkorn University where he also served as a Teaching Assistant in statistics under the university's Faculty of Engineering. Currently, he is studying for his PhD degree in industrial engineering at Chulalongkorn University.

== Career ==
=== Acting ===
Suppasit began his acting career in the Thai boys' love (BL) series I Am Your King in 2017. The following year, he was cast in his first main role in the BL series, What The Duck: The Series (2018), as "Pree". Due to the series' popularity, it was confirmed that a second season would start filming. What The Duck 2: The Final Call, premiered on March 18, 2019, on LINE TV.

In early 2019, Suppasit was cast as "Tharn", one of the main protagonist of GMM One's and LINE TV's TharnType. The sequel Tharntype The Series 2: 7 Years of Love was announced and it premiered on November 6, 2020.

In 2021, Suppasit starred in a short action film titled Undefeated by Garena Free Fire Thailand, along with Urassaya Sperbund and Luke Ishikawa. Suppasit also played the lead role of "Maen" in the mini-series Super แม้น (Super Maen) under the Drama For All project by Thai PBS. The project aimed to expand a communication boundary in the society, giving everyone equal access including the visually impaired and people with hearing disabilities.

In 2022, Suppasit made a guest appearance as "Dan" in the Thai drama Innocent Lies on Channel 7, a sequel to Chain of Vengeance, and had a recurring role in the sitcom Factory of Love on Workpoint TV.

In 2023, Suppasit starred in the drama Love Hurts on One31, together with Davika Hoorne and Jes Jespipat, and in the romantic comedy series Love Me Again on VIU Thailand with Lapassalan Jiravechsoontornkul. He also had a supporting role in Something in the Wind on Channel 7.

In 2024, Suppasit appeared in the Korean-Thai BL drama Love Is Like A Cat on Rakuten Viki with members of the South Korean boy band Just B JM and Geonu, and in the musical-comedy-romance remake of Mon Rak Luk Thung with Charlotte Austin on Channel 3.

In 2025, he led Homeroom 29 Hostages the Thai adaptation of the 2019 Japanese psychological school drama series Mr. Hiiragi's Homeroom, as "Win", a teacher addressing bullying by holding 29 students hostage to uncover the truth behind a classmate's death. Directed by Khom Kongkiat Khomsiri and Kao Wirada Khuhavanta, the 16-episode thriller aired on TrueID, garnering over 10 million views on the platform. He also starred in the drama Rak Salap Lai with Fonthip Watcharatrakul on One 31.

In 2026 he feature in the romantic comedy My Wife’s Gunslinger God alongside Sushar Manaying on TrueVisions NOW.

Suppasit is set to appear in the horror film Replace me, directed by Kongkiat Khomsiri and co-starring Ananda Everingham, with a planned theatrical release.

=== Music ===
Suppasit made his official debut as a singer upon the release of his first single titled "Season of You" on August 1, 2020. The song and music video were launched through a global press conference with the hashtag #SeasonOfYouGlobalPress trending number 1 on Twitter worldwide and in 16 other locations. It became the most tweeted hashtag on that day with over 1.2 million tweets. He released subsequent singles namely Nan Na (ft. NiceCNX), Good Day, THANOS, written and produced by Wan Thanakrit, and his first self-composed song, Summer Fireworks.

On 1 August 2021, in celebration of the first anniversary of his official debut as a singer, Suppasit released his debut album titled "365" together with the music video of the album's promotional single, "Drowning". The album ranked at #3 on the worldwide iTunes album chart. It charted at # 1 in 18 countries, also entering the top 100 charts in 43 locations. With the success of the album, Suppasit became the first and only Thai artist to debut an album that reached # 13 on iTunes' Global Digital Artist Ranking. Five of the songs from the album made it to Billboard's World Digital Song Sales chart where the song "Drowning" rose to No. 4, closely followed by "Missing You" ft. Zom Marie (No. 5), "Let Me Be" ft. Autta (No. 6), "More and More" (No. 7) and finally "Time Machine" (No. 8). Suppasit is the first Thai artist to have entered this chart. His musical achievements have been recognized in 14 Forbes articles, which hailed him as a "multihyphenate artist" and a "history maker" on Billboard's social chart for his chart-topping success.

On 5 October 2021, Mew Suppasit Studio launched the "Global Collaboration Project", starting with SPACEMAN, produced and written by English electronic music duo HONNE. Suppasit did the first live performance of the song at the annual Asia Song Festival 2021, where he was chosen as the representative artist of Thailand. Upon its release on iTunes, SPACEMAN entered the charts in over 40 locations and went up to #1 in 20 locations. It was also # 7 in the worldwide iTunes song chart. SPACEMAN made it to Billboard's Hot Trending Songs chart for 8 consecutive weeks, peaking at #2 in the weekly chart and #1 in the 24-hour chart, making Suppasit the first Thai and Southeast Asian act to enter the said chart. The project continued with "Before 4:30 (She Said...)", featuring and produced by Sam Kim, which hit #1 on iTunes song charts in 21 countries, #1 on iTunes R&B charts in 41 countries (including the US), and #10 worldwide. Its music video, featuring Suppasit, Kim, and Anchilee Scott-Kemmis, was launched at a press conference at ICONSIAM on December 20, 2021, with the livestream gaining 2.9 million views on Weibo. The song debuted at #4 on Billboard's R&B Digital Song Sales chart and #8 on the R&B/Hip-Hop Digital Song Sales chart, another first for a Thai artist.

In 2022, Suppasit went on to release two more collaboration projects namely "Forever Love" featuring South Korean R&B singer Bumkey that was released on July 8, premiered on South Korea's Simply K-POP Con-Tour on July 25 and "Turn Off The Alarm", released on October 23, his duet track with Suho, the leader of the South Korean-Chinese boy group Exo. The release of Turn Off The Alarm was formally kicked off through a press conference held at ICONSIAM on October 23, 2022, with Suppasit and Suho both present at the event.

On October 24, 2024, Suppasit released the single "Absence", dedicated to his partner, whom he proposed to at the song's press conference. In 2025, he released the song "Lucky to Have You", a track dedicated to his fans that was released on June 25,, on October 2nd, he released "Don't Wanna Please The World", a self-composed ballad that explores themes of prioritizing genuine love and personal connections over societal expectations and external pressures, it emphasizes self-acceptance, loyalty to loved ones, and rejecting the need to appease everyone else in favor of focusing on what truly matters and on December 18th, he released "Miss Esme", a song that captures themes of loneliness and nostalgia, particularly evoking the isolation many feel during the Christmas and New Year holiday season, with Mew himself describing it as a representation of that emotional solitude. It draws stylistic influences from old-school Japanese city pop, creating a melancholic, retro vibe that's accentuated by the standout use of trumpet as the primary instrument.

On February 21, 2026, Suppasit released "Imperfect". The lyrics are based on personal experiences, including missing a train during travel and sharing rain under one coat, and focus on themes of embracing imperfections in relationships and finding value in ordinary moments. Suppasit has described the song as drawing from true stories in his life. The pop song was written and composed by Suppasit, with production by 18entity. On June 4, 2026, he released "Entropy". The song is a melancholic, atmospheric ballad that blends ethereal production with emotional vocals. It explores themes of impermanence, the fleeting nature of love and life, and the desire to cherish moments despite inevitable endings. The title and concept draw from the thermodynamic principle of entropy — the tendency toward disorder and the universe's eventual "heat death" — using cosmic and space imagery.

=== Media and hosting ===
Suppasit initially started out in the entertainment industry by appearing in various commercial advertisements and music videos. He was also cast in the Thai version of the Australian mock-dating reality show Taken Out, Take Me Out Thailand and its spin-off show Take Me Out Reality.

From February 8 to April 5, 2021, Suppasit co-hosted Workpoint TV's music program T-Pop Stage alongside June Teeratee, serving as a Master of ceremonies for the show's inaugural season.

In 2026, Suppasit serves as a commentator/judge on the reality competition Duo One: Thailand Chemistry Reality Show airing on Amarin TV, alongside Da Endorphine, Freen, and Becky.

=== Modeling ===
Suppasit began modeling in 2014, appearing in advertisements and fashion campaigns in Thailand. Over the years he has worked with brands such as BOSS, Bvlgari, Versace, Alexander McQueen, Valentino, Dolce & Gabanna, Gucci, Zegna, MCM, FRED Jewelry, Montblanc, H&M, Christian Louboutin, PAINKILLER ATELIER , MOO Bangkok , Tod's and Michael Kors, among many others, and featured in magazines like Prestige (Hong Kong), Harper's Bazaar (Thailand and Singapore), GQ Hype, Knight (China), L' Officiel Hommes (Thailand and Malaysia), U! Magazine (Hong Kong), Cosmopolitan (Indonesia), ELLE (Thailand), GQ (Thailand and Hong Kong), Lifestyle+Travel, Praew, Thai Drama Guide (Japan), August Man (Singapore), Posh (Thailand), Kazz, The Guitar Mag, LifeStyle Asia (Hong Kong), Pet Hipster, Número (Thailand) and Esquire (Singapore).

He has participated in runway shows for various national and international fashion brands. He walked for the Lazada Women's Festival in 2020. He has been a regular model at Bangkok International Fashion Week, having walked for PAINKILLER ATELIER (2022, 2025, 2026), Moo Bangkok (2024), Leisure Projects (2025) and Merge (2026). He opened the World Fashion District: Equinox Summer 2024 runway show as the lead model, clad in BOSS. In September 2024, Suppasit made his debut at Milan Fashion Week, walking the runway for Hugo Boss's Spring/Summer 2025 collection, themed "Out of Office", at the Palazzo del Senato. In September 2025, he returned to Milan Fashion Week, appearing in an introductory video for the livestream of Hugo Boss's Spring/Summer 2026 collection. In January 2026, Suppasit modeled for the Thai brands Decemboy, TandT (TandT Bangkok) and Panya Me during the 2026 Harbin Fashion Week (also called Harbin International Fashion Week), in China. In September 2026, Suppasit made his New York Fashion Week runway debut walking for the American brand Private Policy. The next day he walked again for the Thai brand KH Editions during the special “One Night in Bangkok” showcase.

=== Public Appearances and Engagements ===
Suppasit has performed at several music festivals and held fan meetings in multiple countries. In October 2021, he represented Thailand at the Asia Song Festival, performing his single SPACEMAN as part of a virtual international event. He has also appeared at Thai music festivals, including OCTOPOP, T-Pop Concert Fest, Cat Expo, Big Mountain Music Festival (BMMF) —one of Thailand's largest music events— and นั่งเล่น Music Festival. Additionally, Suppasit has conducted fan meetings and fan signings in Thailand, Vietnam, the Philippines, South Korea, Brazil, China, Japan and Indonesia, often in connection with his music and acting projects.

In 2022, Suppasit was selected as a representative of Thailand's young generation for the Asia-Pacific Economic Cooperation (APEC), promoting Thai culture and youth engagement internationally. In December 2022, he attended the Red Sea International Film Festival in Saudi Arabia as a representative of Thailand. His participation aimed to promote Thai entertainment and foster cultural exchange between Thailand and the international film community. In July 2025, Suppasit participated in the "Thai SELECT Night" event in New York City, organized by the Department of International Trade Promotion under Thailand's Ministry of Commerce to promote authentic Thai cuisine and culture. He appeared alongside Pakorn Thanasrivanitchai and Her Royal Highness Princess Ubolratana Rajakanya. Additionally, Suppasit featured in a promotional cooking vlog for "Princess VLOG x Thai SELECT", collaborating with Princess Ubolratana and Tul Pakorn to showcase Thai culinary traditions in New York.

In 2023, he attended the BOSS's Fall/Winter Collection show at Milan Fashion Week and a private presentation for the H&M x Rabanne collaboration during Paris Fashion Week. He also attended Tod's Spring/Summer show with Pakorn Thanasrivanitchai and the Michael Kors Fall/Winter Collection show at New York Fashion Week 2024. In 2025, he was invited to Montblanc's Fall/Winter Collection presentation at Milan Fashion Week, made his debut at London Fashion Week for the H&M's AW25 collection presentation and returned to Milan Fashion Week for Tod's and BOSS shows.

=== Brand Collaborations ===
As an artist with significant reach, Suppasit is regularly engaged in diverse brand collaborations. He served as brand ambassador for Skechers Thailand from 2020 to 2023. He was appointed as a brand ambassador for Candy Home Appliances, a campaign ambassador for Shopee Thailand, as well as a presenter for Playmore Thailand and Garena Free Fire Thailand. From 2021 to 2022, he was a Brand Friend and presenter for TARO Fish Snack and Yves Rocher Thailand. In 2022, he became the presenter for Gangnam Clinic's Pure Whitening Cream and the brand ambassador for CP Brand’s Chili Pork Bologna and the online shopping application ThisShop. In 2023, he was the brand presenter for Kamoliz Mouth Spray.

In 2024, Suppasit was named a friend of The Voice Foundation, a non-profit supporting disabled, injured, and abused animals. He was also appointed the first Brand Ambassador for H&M in Thailand and Asia, a role he continues to hold. Additionally, he became a Friend of the Brand for the French luxury jewelry brand FRED and the German luxury brand Montblanc, both ongoing since 2024. In 2025, Suppasit became the presenter of ONE Surgery & Aesthetics clinic and THANN's Body & Massage Oil featuring Emultech Technology. He also became the first ambassador for the skincare brand MEDI Jewelry in Thailand.

=== Business Ventures ===
Beyond his entertainment career, Suppasit has pursued several entrepreneurial activities. In May 2020, he founded Mew Suppasit Studio, an entertainment management company where he served as CEO. The studio was closed in December 2022.

In 2023, Suppasit established Sol Skipper, where he continues to serve as CEO. The company originally focused on managing his artistic career and merchandise sales. As of June 2026, it operates as a talent management agency representing Suppasit and actor Sunny Wannarat (Wannarat Wattadalimma).

Suppasit has also co-founded or holds ownership in multiple lifestyle and consumer businesses, primarily launched in 2024 and 2025. These include:

• ONE SkinLabs (2024), a skincare brand.

• ONE Surgery & Aesthetics (2025), an aesthetics clinic where he serves as both CEO and Chief Communication Officer (CCO).

• We Are Young (2025), a cafe.

• Two branches of the matcha cafe Love U So Matcha (2025), which transforms into the bar FDR in the evenings.

• Blessed Hands Thai Massage (2025), a massage salon located in Yaowarat (Bangkok's Chinatown).

• The Great Coffee (2025), another cafe venture.

=== Production ===
In 2022, Suppasit took on the role of executive producer and lead actor (playing "Natee") for The Ocean Eyes, a television series about marine veterinarians at a prestigious oceanographic institute, featuring a character with telepathic abilities. The project, a Thailand-China-United States co-production under Mew Suppasit Studio, involved filmmakers Rick McCallum (The Young Indiana Jones Chronicles), Herbert Primig (Star Wars: The Clone Wars), and screenwriter Henry Gilroy (Star Wars: The Clone Wars). Filming began in March 2022 and was expected to last approximately two months, with a planned release in 2023. The series aimed to promote marine conservation and featured actors Tul Pakorn Thanasrivanitchai, Marina Sadanun Balenciaga, and Morakot Liu. Following the completion of filming, The Ocean Eyes was put on hold after Suppasit parted ways with his previous manager, who was a key producer at Mew Suppasit Studio and involved in the project. As of 2025, the series remains unreleased, with its future uncertain.

== Philanthropy ==
Suppasit has been associated with several charitable initiatives, often facilitated through his fanbase, known as "Mewlions", and his company. In March 2021, Suppasit participated in Pet Expo Thailand, where a portion of the event's revenues was allocated to animal shelters for the rescue and care of abused, abandoned, sick, or injured pets. In May 2021, Suppasit organized an online charity concert called ShaReTy. Together with fellow singers Wan Thanakrit and Mariam Grey, they were able to raise a total of 2,196,578.79 baht, which were donated to Bang Bo Hospital and Samutprakan Hospital to help COVID-19 patients, medical frontliners, and to aid in purchasing medical equipments as well. In August 2021, Suppasit and other celebrities donated masks, hand sanitizers, PPE sets to hospitals and volunteer foundations, and food packages to those affected by COVID-19 and fans donated 6,000 baht on behalf of Suppasit and his mother to support individuals affected by COVID-19 in Thailand.

In January 2022, a donation of 100,000 baht was made in Suppasit's name by Taiwanese fans to The Mirror Foundation's Thai Missing project, aiding efforts to locate missing people. Additionally, in February 2022, Suppasit's international fanbase contributed US$500 to Tackle Kids Cancer, supporting pediatric cancer research, as part of a birthday celebration project. In April 2022, Chinese fans donated approximately 38,000 baht to Bandek Ramindra School, a home for blind children with multiple disabilities, in Suppasit's name. In June 2022, he performed at the UNICEF Blue Carpet Show, a televised event aimed at raising funds for children in need in Thailand and globally. In October 2022, Suppasit and Mew Suppasit Studio donated 10,000 baht to provide sports and educational equipment to a local community.

In January 2023, Suppasit, his mother and sister, participated in a merit-making event at a temple with over 600 fans, supported by food trucks from fans worldwide and three from him and his company. Fans donated money for the merit, and Suppasit donated items to the needy, followed by a group prayer.

In August 2024, Suppasit partnered with PAINKILLER Atelier to make a limited edition collection in which all profits from sales were donated to The Voice Foundation, in which he is friend, aiding in the care and love of stray and abandoned animals.

== Personal life ==
Suppasit has been in a relationship with Thai actor, architect and businessman Tul Pakorn Thanasrivanitchai since August 2022, with their relationship publicly confirmed in July 2024 and their engagement announced on October 24, 2024.

On October 28, 2024, Suppasit was ordained as a Buddhist monk at Wat Buranasiri Mattayaram in Bangkok, receiving the monastic name Punyawattano Bhikkhu, which translates to "one who prospers in wisdom". He spent 17 days studying Buddhism at various temples, including a forest temple in Chiang Mai, before disrobing on November 14, 2024.

Suppasit owns two dogs: Chopper, a miniature Pomeranian, and Mushu, a Pembroke Welsh Corgi. Both dogs frequently appear on his social media accounts. In early 2026 he took in a stray black-and-white cat named Lucky, a tuxedo-pattern cat that had been bullied by neighborhood cats and sought shelter at his home.

== Filmography ==
Key
†	Denotes films that have not yet been released

=== Film ===
Year	Title	Role	Notes	Ref.
2017	Retrospect		Short film by Genie Records	
2021	Undefeated	Sho	Short film by Garena Free Fire Thailand	
2024	The Package	Park	Movie by TrueID	
TBA	Replace Me †	Intai	Movie by Halo Productions with Benley Film	
TBA	Before Dad is Gone (ตี่ย) †		Movie by Monwichit Entertainment	
TBA	Ah Boys To Firefighters (英雄无名) †		Movie by J Team Productions, Little Green White and mm2 Entertainment	

=== Television series ===
Year	Title	Role	Channel	Notes	Ref.
2014	Ban Tuk Kam (บันทึกกรรม)	Top	Channel 3	EP: La Taem (ล่าแต้ม) Guest Role	
2014	Ban Tuk Kam (บันทึกกรรม)	Get	Channel 3	EP: Game Na Rok Deead (เกมนรกเดือด) Guest Role	
2014	Ban Tuk Kam (บันทึกกรรม)	Max	Channel 3	EP: Kwam Lab(Rak)Kong Sup Tar (ความลับ(รัก)ของเซเลป) Guest Role	
2014	Soot Ruk Chun La Moon (สูตรรักชุลมุน)	Game	ONE 31	EP:4 Jao Kwang noi (เจ้ากวางน้อย); Guest Role	
2014	Rak Jing Ping Ger (รักจริงปิ๊งเก้อ)	Bird	BANG CHANNEL	EP: Happy Bad Day; Guest Role	
2015	Liam Jone (เหลี่ยมโจร)	Mek	Channel 3	EP: Nee Bad (หนี้บัตร); Guest Role	
2017	I AM YOUR KING ผมขอสั่งให้คุณ	Teacher Peem	9NAA Channel	Guest Role	
2018	What The Duck รักแลนดิ้ง	Pree	LINE TV	Main Role	
2019	What the Duck 2: Final Call	Pree	LINE TV	Main Role	
2019	TharnType	Tharn	ONE 31	Main Role	
2020	Why R U?	Tharn	ONE 31	Guest Role	
2020	TharnType 2: 7 Years of Love	Tharn	ONE 31	Main Role	
2021	Drama For All: Super แม้น	Maen	Thai PBS	Main Role	
2022	Factory of Love (โรงงานบรรจุรัก)	Nont	Workpoint TV	Main Role	
2022	Innocent Lies (บ่วงวิมาลา)	Dan	Channel 7	Guest Role	
2023	Love Hurts (รักร้าย)	Bunthao Pattasak (Thao)	ONE 31	Main Role	
2023	Love Me Again	Pop Purim	Viu Thailand	Main Role	
2023	Something in the Wind (ลมพัดผ่านดาว)	Tossapol	Channel 7	Supporting Role	
2024	Falling in Love (มนต์รักลูกทุ่ง)	Khlao	Channel 3	Main Role	
2024	Love is like a Cat (사랑은 고양이처럼)	Uno	Rakuten Viki	Main Role	
2025	HOMEROOM 29 hostages (HOMEROOM 29 ตัวประกัน)	Wynn	TrueID TV	Main Role	
2025	The Twin Gambit (รักสลับลาย)	Tul	ONE 31	Main Role	
2026	My Wife's Gunslinger God (ถึงคุณภรรยา...จากสามีที่รัก)	Rapee	TrueVisions NOW	Main Role	
TBA	The Ocean Eyes †	Dr. Natee		Main Role, Executive Producer	

=== Television show ===
Year	Title	Role	Channel	Note
2017	Take Me Out Thailand	Guest	TV Thunder	EP. 17 S11
2017	Take Me Out Reality	Cast Member	TV Thunder	S2 EPs. 1–5
2020	6 Scenes (หกฉากครับจารย์)	Regular Guest	Workpoint TV	-
2020	Preawpak 2020 (เปรี้ยวปาก 2563)	Guest	Channel 3	EPs. 1, 48
2020	Love Delivery Fest by UNICEF	Guest	Workpoint TV	-
2020	The Wall Song (The Wall Song ร้องข้ามกำแพง)	Guest	Workpoint TV	EP. 12
2021	Sound Check	Guest	One 31	EPs. 2, 43
2021	Blue Carpet Show for UNICEF	Guest	Channel 7	-
2021	โต๊ะนี้มีจอง (WHO IS MY CHEF)	Guest	Workpoint TV	Ep. 100
2021	T-POP STAGE	MC	Workpoint TV	8 February – 5 April 2021
2021	เลดี้พลาซ่า (Lady Plaza)	Guest	Workpoint TV	Eps. 128, 173–174
2021	Follow My Fellow	Cast Member	POPS Thailand	EPs. 1–5, 32–34
2021	ก็มาดิคร้าบ (JOKER FAMILY)	Guest	Workpoint TV	EP. 8
2021	Hollywood Game Night Thailand	Guest	Channel 3	EP. 12
2021	ตีท้ายครัว	Guest	Channel 3	EP. 69
2021	Simply K-Pop CON-TOUR	Guest	Arirang TV	EP. 468
2021	The Wall Song (The Wall Song ร้องข้ามกำแพง)	Guest	Workpoint TV	EP. 50
2021	The Money Drop Thailand เดอะมันนี่ดรอปไทยแลนด์	Guest	Channel 7	EPs. 67–69
2021	I Can See Your Voice Thailand	Guest	Workpoint TV	EP. 285
2022	The Golden Song เวทีเพลงเพราะ 4	Guest	One 31	EP. 6
2022	Sound Check	Guest	One 31	EP. 28
2022	Magic Wars (ศึกมายากล)	Guest	Workpoint TV	EPs. 6, 13
2022	เวลากามเทพ in concert	Guest Singer	One 31	-
2022	Simply K-Pop CON-TOUR	Special Guest	Arirang TV	EP. 530
2022	ฮัลโหลซุปตาร์ (Hello Superstar)	Guest	Channel 7	-
2023	เจาะใจ Johjai	Guest	MCOT HD	EP. 5
2023	Thairath Talk	Guest	Thairath TV	-
2023	เรื่องของเรื่อง	Guest	One 31	EP. 21
2023	เลดี้พลาซ่า (Lady Plaza)	Guest	Workpoint TV	Ep. 274
2023	The Wall Song (The Wall Song ร้องข้ามกำแพง)	Guest	Workpoint TV	EP. 169
2024	ผู้หญิงยกกำลังแจ๋ว	Guest	Channel 3	EP. 996
2024	Hollywood Game Night Thailand	Guest	Channel 3	EP. 33
2025	ล้น FEED	Guest	One 31	EP. 4
2025	4 ต่อ 4 Celebrity	Guest	One 31	EPs. 933, 941
2025	เกลือวันเด้อ	Guest	One 31	EPs. 93
2025	แฉ	Guest	GMMTV	EP. 58
2025	เรื่องของเรื่อง	Guest	One 31	EP. 5
2025	GOODBYEตายไม่รู้ตัว	Guest	One 31	EP. 23
2025	Praew Talk TV	Guest	Amarin TV	EP. 7
2025	Faceoffแฝดคนละฝา	Guest	Workpoint TV	EP. 77
2025	oneบันเทิง	Guest	One 31	EP. 147
2025	ไนน์เอ็นเตอร์เทน	Guest	MCOT HD	EP. 175
2025	คุยแซ่บ show	Guest	One 31	EP. 1650
2025	Mellow POP Night Live	Guest	MCOT HD	EP. 10
2025	Talk To U	Guest	Channel 7	EP. 16
2026	The Wall Song (The Wall Song ร้องข้ามกำแพง)	Guest	Workpoint TV	EP. 285
2026	แฉ	Guest	GMMTV	EP. 36
2026	The Face Men Thailand 4	Guest	Channel 3	EP. 6
2026	ทศกัณฐ์ รันวงการ (Who's This?: Name the Fame)	Guest	Workpoint TV	EP. 53
2026	โต๊ะนี้มีจอง (WHO IS MY CHEF)	Guest	Workpoint TV	EP. 384

=== Music video appearances ===
Year	Song title	Artist(s)	Ref.
2009	รักหรือไม่รัก feat.กระแต	Dr. Fuu	
2011	คำถามอยู่ที่ฉัน คำตอบอยู่ที่เธอ	Pancake (Band)	
2012	แฟนน่ารัก	Olives	
2017	ภาพถ่าย	Retrospect	
2020	It Takes Two	STAMP	
2021	Blush	Zom Marie	
2021	ไม่ต้องพยายาม	The Glass Girls (Unit Grande)	
2023	CLOSER (Clothes Off)	MATCHA	
2024	ทำใจเก่ง (Great with Goodbyes)	KNOMJEAN	
2025	พยายามสิเซาฮัก	Tai Orathai	

== Fan meetings and fan signings ==
Year	Date	City	Venue	Ref.
2020	February 2	Bangkok	M Theatre	
2020	February 15	Manila	Teatrino Promenade Greenhills	
2022	December 19	Seoul	The auditorium of Sungshin Women's University Unjeong Green Campus	
2023	January 28	Seoul	Unjeong Women's University	
2023	February 11	Bangkok	Union Mall	
2023	May 12	Jakarta	Balai Sarbini	
2023	October 27	Manila	Samsung Hall	
2023	November 10	Hong Kong	BP International Gordon Wu Hall	
2024	February 11	Bangkok	Union Hall	
2024	March 9	Tokyo	EX Theater Roppongi	
2024	August 18	São Paulo	Terra SP	
2025	February 22	Bangkok	KBank Siam Pic-Ganesha Theatre	
2025	June 14	Shenzhen		
2025	June 15	Shanghai	Raffles City Atrium	
2025	October 4	Tokyo	Ebisu Garden Hall	
2026	February 21	Bangkok	KBank Siam Pic-Ganesha Theatre	
2026	June 7	Tokyo		
2026	September 3-4	Macau	City of Dreams	

== Discography ==
=== Singles ===
Song title	Year	Label	Ref.
"Season of You" (ทุกฤดู)	2020	Distributed by Warner Music Thailand	
"Nan Na" (feat. NICECNX)	2020	Distributed by Warner Music Thailand	
"Good Day"	2021	Distributed by Warner Music Thailand	
"Thanos"	2021	Distributed by Warner Music Thailand	
"Summer Fireworks"	2021	Distributed by Warner Music Thailand	
"Drowning"	2021	Distributed by Warner Music Thailand	
"SPACEMAN"	2021	Distributed by Warner Music Thailand	
"Before 4:30 (She said...)" With Sam Kim	2021	Distributed by Warner Music Thailand	
"Season of You" (Winter Version)	2021	Distributed by Warner Music Thailand	
"SPACEMAN" (Acoustic Version)	2021	Distributed by Warner Music Thailand	
"Forever Love" (feat. Bumkey)	2022	Distributed by Warner Music Thailand	
"Turn off the Alarm" (feat. Suho)	2022	Distributed by Warner Music Thailand	
"Absence (ช่องว่างหัวใจ)"	2024	Distributed by Warner Music Thailand	
"Lucky to Have You"	2025	Distributed by Warner Music Thailand	
"โชคดีแค่ไหนที่มีเธอ (Lucky To Have You)" (Thai Version)	2025	Distributed by Warner Music Thailand	
"Don't Wanna Please the World"	2025	Distributed by Warner Music Thailand	
"Miss Esme"	2025	Distributed by Warner Music Thailand	
"Imperfect"	2026	Distributed by Warner Music Thailand	
"Entropy"	2026	Distributed by Warner Music Thailand	

=== Studio albums ===
Title	Album details	Ref.
365	Released: August 1, 2021; Formats: CD, Vinyl, Digital Streaming	

=== Music projects ===
Year	Title	Notes	Ref.
2021	"บอกฉัน" (Tell Me)	JOOX 100x100 SEASON 3 SPECIAL	
2021	"ก่อนรักกลายเป็นเกลียด" (Love-Hate) (With Violette Wautier)	Free Fire 4 FEST	
2021	The Way I Am (Acoustic Version)	Gavin Haley x Mew Suppasit	
2021	"เป็นทุกอย่าง" Original by Room39	ชวนน้องมาร้องเพลง by LOVEiS Entertainment Studio	
2023	"รักได้รักไปแล้ว" Original by Four-Mod	รักได้รักไปแล้ว - Switching Voice Project	

=== Soundtrack appearances ===
Year	Title	Soundtrack	Ref.
2022	Our Time	เวลากามเทพ (Cupid's Time) OST	
2023	พร้อมทำแทนได้ทุกอย่าง	Ost. TANMAN - แทนแมน ทำแทนได้	
2023	บรรเทา	รักร้าย (Love Hurts) OST	
2024	มนต์รักลูกทุ่ง ๒๕๖๗	มนต์รักลูกทุ่ง ๒๕๖๗ (Mon Rak Luk Thung) OST	
2024	มาตามสัญญา (feat. Charlotte Austin)	มนต์รักลูกทุ่ง ๒๕๖๗ (Mon Rak Luk Thung) OST	
2024	ทุ่งนาปาร์ตี้ (other artists included)	มนต์รักลูกทุ่ง ๒๕๖๗ (Mon Rak Luk Thung) OST	
2024	สิบหมื่น	มนต์รักลูกทุ่ง ๒๕๖๗ (Mon Rak Luk Thung) OST	

== Awards and nominations ==
Year	Awards	Category	Nominated work	Result	Ref.
2020	LINE TV Awards 2020	Best Kiss Scene	TharnType	Won	
2020	Kazz Awards 2020	Young Man of the Year		Won	
2020	Kazz Awards 2020	Best Scene	TharnType	Won	
2020	Kazz Awards 2020	Best couple of the year	TharnType	Nominated	
2020	Howe Awards 2019	Best couple	TharnType	Won	
2020	Maya Awards 2020	Best couple	TharnType	Won	
2020	Maya Awards 2020	Male Star		Won	
2020	Zoomdara Awards 2020	Zoomdara of the Year Award		Won	
2021	Thailand Zocial Awards 2021	Couple of the Year		Won	
2021	JOOX Thailand Music Awards 2021	Top Social Artist of the Year		Nominated	
2021	T-Pop Stage Show	Music of the Week (Weeks 1 & 2)	Good Day	Won	
2021	T-Pop Stage Show	Music of the Week (Week 6)	Thanos	Won	
2021	T-Pop Stage Show	Music of the Week (Weeks 20 & 21)	Summer Fireworks	Won	
2021	Howe Awards 2020	New Generation Award		Won	
2021	Howe Awards 2020	Best Male Singer		Won	
2021	T-Pop Stage Show	Music of the Week (Week 9)	Spaceman	Won	
2021	Maya Awards 2021	People's Choice Solo Artist		Won	
2022	T-Pop Stage Show	Music of the Week (Weeks 18, 19, 20 & 21)	Before 4:30 (She Said...)	Won	
2022	Thailand Zocial Awards 2022	Best Male Artist		Nominated	
2022	Zoomdara Awards 2021	Best Solo Artist of the Year		Won	
2022	18th Kom Chad Luek Awards	Popular Thai International Singer		Nominated	
2022	18th Kom Chad Luek Awards	Popular Actor		Nominated	
2022	JOOX Thailand Music Awards 2022	Top Social Artist of the Year		Nominated	
2022	The Guitar Mag Awards 2021	New Wave of the Year		Nominated	
2022	The Wall Song Thailand	Duet of the Year		Won	
2022	Maya Entertain Awards 2022	Hot Star of the Year		Won	
2022	Kazz Awards 2022	Popular Male Artist		Won	
2022	GQ Men of the Year Awards 2022	Top Trender		Won	
2023	Asia Top Awards 2023	Best Actor (Series)	Love Me Again	Won	
2023	Howe Awards 2023	Howe The Best Drama Social Award	Love Hurts	Won	
2024	Japan Expo Thailand 2024	Japan Expo Actors Award		Won	
2024	Thairath Talk Awards 2023	Inspirational Guest Award		Won	
2024	Sanook Best Of The Year Awards 2023	Best Thai Drama of the Year	Love Hurts	Won	
2024	Kazz Awards 2024	Drama Award of the Year	Love Hurts	Won	
2024	Kazz Awards 2024	Best Actor of the Year		Nominated	
2025	Zoomdara Awards 2024	Zoomdara Couple of the Entertainment Industry		Won	
2025	Zoomdara Awards 2024	The Hottest Hit Song of the Year	Absence	Won	
2025	Lifestyle Asia 50 ICONS 2025	Next-Gen Changemakers		Won	
2025	30th Asian Television Awards	Best Adaptation of an Existing Format	Homeroom 29 Hostages	Nominated	
2026	Kazz Awards 2026	The Best Actor Of The Year		Won	
2026	HOWE Awards 2026	HOWE Popular Icon Award		Won	
