= Let's Fight Ghost (Thai TV series) =

2021 Thai television series

- Thai: คู่ไฟท์ไฝว้ผี
- Genre: Horror; Mystery; Romantic comedy
- Based on: Let's Fight, Ghost by CJ E&M
- Developed by: True CJ Creations
- Written by: Jatuporn Butkhot; Pairach Thatone; Weerachat Narintarakul Na Ayutthaya; Alisa Yuangsawat; Walailak Somchinda; Suphawat Hongsa; Thap Anan Thanaduliyawat
- Directed by: Kongkiat Khomsiri
- Starring: Suppapong Udomkaewkanjana; Patchanan Jiajirachote; Thongpoom Siripipat
- Ending theme: "Rak hai thuengthisut" by Pawee Kochaphakdi
- Country of origin: Thailand
- Original language: Thai
- No. of episodes: 16

Production
- Executive producers: Supachai Chearavanont; Apichat Honghiranruang; Nopparoj Chotmongkongsit
- Producers: Apirak Kanphonhai; Phusit Charoen Art
- Cinematography: Ruangwit Ramsut
- Running time: 70 minute
- Production companies: Studio Dragon; True Corporation; True CJ Creations

Original release
- Network: True4U, True Asian Series HD
- Release: March 3 – July 22, 2021

Let's Fight Ghost is a 2021 Thai romantic-action fantasy drama television series adaptation / remake of the 2016 South Korean series Bring It On, Ghost.

It's the 5th work of True CJ Creations Company, a joint venture between the South Korean CJ E&M and the True Corporation of Thailand.

== Synopsis ==
The story revolves around Off Issawa (Suppapong Udomkaewkanjana), a medical student, who has grown up with the ability to see ghosts. He uses his power to work as an exorcist, banishing ghosts in order to make enough money to undergo a procedure that will take his ability away. At a haunted girls' high school, he encounters Jeen Jidapa (Patchanan Jiajirachote), an amnesiac ghost, who wants to get rid of another ghost.

Initially, Off thinks it is Jeen who needs to be banished, but after a brief fight, which ends up with Off accidentally kissing Jeen, she starts to remember a part of her past. Jeen can also see the vulnerable spot of their adversaries and how they ended up being ghosts.

However, Off and Jeen are unaware that they are being stalked by an evil spirit that causes problems for both.

== Cast ==
| Role | Main Actor |
|---|---|
| Off Issawa | Suppapong Udomkaewkanjana |
| Jeen Jidapa | Patchanan Jiajirachote |
| Dr. Jade | Thongpoom Siripipat |
| Senior Junior | Aphiwit Reardon |
| Senior Leng | Kornwit Soongkitboon |
| Numwan | Warataya Wongchayaporn |
| Role | Supporting Actor |
| Inspector Ton | Phakchanok Voonsri |
| Lieutenant Yot | Komsan Kajornpaisarnsuk |
| Monk Mon | Wannasak Sirila |
| Muk (Off's mother) | Kwanruedi Klomklom |
| Eed (Off's father) | Thanongsak Supakarn |
| Dr. Jade's mother | Wassana Sitthiwet |
| Jeen's mother | Supranee Charoenphon |
| Jim's ghost | Porwilai Apiratchadaporn |
| Mister (Off's helper ghost) | Somchai Sakdikul |
| Role | Guest Actor |
| Senior Leng's grandmother | Wiyada Komarakul Na Nakorn |
| Bow, the lover's partner (EP.10) | Jessica Phasaphan |
| Nan, the lover's sister (EP.10) | Watoosiri Phuwapanyasiri |
| Metal singer ghost (EP.11) | Natnat Hirunsomboon |
| The ghost boy's father (EP.3) | Wasin Pokpong |
| Master Winai (EP.9) | Therdporn Manopaiboon |
| Not, the lover (EP.10) | Sakharin Suthamsamai |
| Monk Orn, Monk Mon's friend | Duangjai Hiransri |

== Production ==
The filming of Let's Fight, Ghost took 1 year and 6 months to complete, starting fitting in mid-August 2019. Shooting started in September 2019, but due to the COVID-19 situation, filming was suspended from March to May 2020 and filming started again in June 2020 until the filming finished in mid-September. There were 106 production queues in 2020 while filming. Post-processing and adding CGI took more than 5 months to finish.

== Original soundtrack ==
- "Rak hai thuengthisut" (รักให้ถึงที่สุด) by Pawee Kochaphakdi
- "Rak hai thuengthisut" (รักให้ถึงที่สุด) by Suppapong Udomkaewkanjana
- "Hak tao lai" (ฮักต้าวหลาย) by Apiwat Boon-Anek, Leew Ajareeya Prompruek
- "Yapyoen" (ยับเยิน) by Khempoom Phothichai
- "Mi thoe talotpai" (มีเธอตลอดไป) by Thanachai Ujjin, Waruntorn Paonil, Pativate Utaichalurm
- "Mai mo mai som" (ไม่เหมาะไม่สม) by Natnat Hirunsomboon
- "Lyong Lyo" by Zack Tabudlo (Philippines)
- "Selamanya Ada" by Aviwkila (Indonesia)

== Reception ==
Let's Fight, Ghost has been praised for the storyline being adapted to fit to Thai culture, including communicating the culture of Thai food in each episode, and was able to tear down the adage that the presentation of Thai ghost films emphasizes horror and superstition. Effects work and CGI have also been praised.

The ratings were able to be in the Top 10 TV Show in Thailand on Netflix from the first week and in the Top 10 in Thailand on Netflix from the second week, with a score of 7.7 in IMDb After a retrospective count, the program has been viewed on TrueID more than 4.5 million times. In addition, after all 16 episodes were aired in Thailand on April 22, 2021, it became available to stream on Netflix Asia from April 23, 2021. The program was available to stream on Netflix Europe, America and Latin America on April 22, 2021.

== Awards and nominations ==
| Award | Category | Nominee | Result |
|---|---|---|---|
| KAZZ AWARDS 2021 | 2021 Couple of the year | Suppapong Udomkaewkanjana and Patchanan Jiajirachote | Nominated |
| MAYA AWARDS 2021 (Maya Public Company) | Series of the Year, People's Favorite | Let's Fight Ghost คู่ไฟท์ไฝว้ผี | Nominated |
| MAYA AWARDS 2021 (Maya Public Company) | Rising star heroine, The public's favorite | Patchanan Jiajirachote | Nominated |
| MAYA AWARDS 2021 (Maya Public Company) | Rising star hero, The public's favorite | Suppapong Udomkaewkanjana | Nominated |
