= Why R U? =

2020 Thai television series

- Official series poster
- Thai: เพราะรักใช่เปล่า
- Genre: Boys' love
- Starring: Suppapong Udomkaewkanjana; Pruk Panich; Sittichok Pueakpoolpol; Karn Kritsanaphan
- Country of origin: Thailand
- Original language: Thai
- No. of episodes: 13

Production
- Production location: Thailand
- Running time: 1 hr 5 min
- Production company: One31

Original release
- Network: Line TV
- Release: 24 January – 24 April 2020

Why R U? (Thai: เพราะรักใช่เปล่า) is a 2020 Thai boys' love television series starring Suppapong Udomkaewkanjana and Pruk Panich. The series was directed by Thanamin Wongskulphat. The show was premiered in Thailand and aired from January 24, 2020 to April 24, 2020.

== Cast ==
=== Main ===
- Suppapong Udomkaewkanjana as Tutor
- Pruk Panich as Fighter
- Sittichok Pueakpoolpol as Zon
- Karn Kritsanaphan as Saifah

=== Recurring ===
- Janistar Phomphadungcheep as Hwahwa
- Akalavut Mankalasut as Day
- Veerinsara Tangkitsuvanich as Zol
- Piamchon Damrongsunthornchai as Natee
- Saran Rujeerattanavorapan as Dew
- Natasit Uareksit as Blue
- Parnupat Anomakiti as Japan
- Wichai Saefant as Tanthai
- Sorntast Buangam as Champ
- Thanapat Thanachakulphisan as Zen
- Ratchapong Anomkiti as Junior
- Arachaporn Pokinpakorn as Soda
- Ratchawit Chanrunganan as Tem
- Metinee Kingpayome as Zon's mother
- Penpetch Benyakul as Zon's father
- Rusameekae Fagerlund as Kae
- Peerada Namwong as Hwahwa's friend
- Taralatah as Luktan
- Ruengrit McIntosh as Fighter's father

=== Guest ===
- Suppasit Jongcheveevat as Tharn
- Kanawut Traipipattanapong as Type
- Krittapak Udompanich as Tee
- Peemapol Panichtamrong as Fuse

== Accolades ==
- Yniverse Awards 2020 - The Greatest Series of the Yniverse
- Yniverse Awards 2020 - Kiss Couple of the Yniverse - Karn Kritsanaphan and Sittichok Pueakpoolpol
- Yniverse Awards 2020 - Hottest Star of the Yniverse - Pruk Panich
- Central BL Awards 2021 (Mexico) - Best Dramatic Scene - Pruk Panich and Suppapong Udomkaewkanjana
- Central BL Awards 2021 (Mexico) - Best Kiss Scene - Karn Kritsanaphan and Sittichok Pueakpoolpol
