= Peach Lover =

2026 Thai television series

- ลูกพีชทานสด
- Genre: Boys' love, Drama
- Based on: ลูกพีชทานสด by Hamster
- Directed by: Thanamin Wongskulphat
- Country of origin: Thailand
- Original language: Thai language
- No. of episodes: 10

Production
- Running time: 53 min

Original release
- Network: Channel 9 (MCOT), iQIYI
- Release: January 20, 2026 – present

Peach Lover (Thai: ลูกพีชทานสด) is a Thai television series BL released in 2026 as an original title of the streaming platform iQIYI, with broadcast on MCOT Channel 9. The series adapts the 18+ novel of the same name by HAMSTER and is directed by Thanamin Wongskulphat. It premiered on January 20, 2026, with weekly episodes on Tuesdays.

== Synopsis ==
Apo, a devoted fan of an adult influencer known as "Peach Lover," applies to become his professional partner. The encounter between Sasom, behind the Peach Lover persona, and Apo turns a contractual arrangement into an intimate relationship, where attraction and trust collide with fame, boundaries, and public exposure. As their bond deepens, both must decide whether to keep the safe distance of a contract or embrace feelings that no longer fit within its rules.

== Cast ==
=== Main ===
- Ki Niwat Naknuan – Sasom (Peach Lover)
- Poom Nuttapart Tuntistinchai – Po

=== Supporting ===
- Wind Theerameth Phirabawornsuk – Meen
- Praptpadol Suwanbang – Chao Sua
- Heng Asavarid Pinitkanjanapun – Ngoen
- Inthapuch Banyada – Pin
- Chin Nutchapol Saetan – Tonnam

== Production ==
The series was announced as an iQIYI original for 2026 and included in the line-up presented at the platform's promotional events in Thailand, highlighting simultaneous digital distribution and broadcast on MCOT Channel 9.

== Broadcast ==
The production is an iQIYI original, with digital release and television broadcast in Thailand via Channel 9 (MCOT). Episodes air weekly on Tuesdays, with an approximate runtime of 53 minutes. The official trailer and promotional materials were released through official channels and local media.

== Reception ==
On the iQIYI platform, Peach Lover holds a rating of 9.9/10 based on 287 user reviews. Thai media reported on the premiere and positioned the series as an iQIYI original. Komchadluek highlighted the launch and the main cast, while TrueID published an episode guide and overview of the project. News outlets such as MGR Online and Thailand Business News covered the series’ inclusion in iQIYI's 2026 line-up.

== Episodes ==
The first season was announced with ten weekly episodes starting January 20, 2026.

No.	Title	Original release date	Network
1	"Episode 1"	January 20, 2026	iQIYI / Channel 9 (MCOT)
2	"Episode 2"	January 27, 2026	iQIYI / Channel 9 (MCOT)
3	"Episode 3"	February 3, 2026	iQIYI / Channel 9 (MCOT)
4	"Episode 4"	February 10, 2026	iQIYI / Channel 9 (MCOT)
5	"Episode 5"	February 17, 2026	iQIYI / Channel 9 (MCOT)
6	"Episode 6"	February 24, 2026	iQIYI / Channel 9 (MCOT)
7	"Episode 7"	March 3, 2026	iQIYI / Channel 9 (MCOT)
8	"Episode 8"	March 10, 2026	iQIYI / Channel 9 (MCOT)
9	"Episode 9"	March 17, 2026	iQIYI / Channel 9 (MCOT)
10	"Episode 10"	March 24, 2026	iQIYI / Channel 9 (MCOT)
