= My Sweetheart Jom =

2025 Thai television series

- หวานใจผู้ใหญ่จอม
- Genre: Romantic comedy; Boys' love
- Based on: Wanjai Phuyai Jom by Naoto
- Directed by: Songsak Mongkolthong
- Starring: Suppapong Udomkaewkanjana; Nuttapart Tuntistinchai
- Theme music composer: Teeraphong Prathumrat; Ekkaphop Khiaoyasit
- Country of origin: Thailand
- Original language: Thai
- No. of seasons: 1
- No. of episodes: 12

Production
- Producers: Suppapong Udomkaewkanjana; Kachen Sodpho
- Production locations: Bang Pho, Thailand
- Running time: 45 minutes
- Production company: Idol Factory

Original release
- Network: Workpoint TV; YouTube
- Release: 16 May – 1 August 2025

My Sweetheart Jom (Thai: หวานใจผู้ใหญ่จอม) is a 2025 Thai romantic comedy boys' love television series produced by Idol Factory. It aired on Workpoint TV and was released internationally via the company's official YouTube channel. The series stars Suppapong Udomkaewkanjana (Saint) and Nuttapart Tuntistinchai (Poom) in the lead roles.

== Synopsis ==
Yothin, a wealthy city boy, gets into trouble after a conflict involving the girlfriend of a mafia boss's son. To protect him, his father sends him to the rural village of Bang Pho, where he must stay under the supervision of Jomkhwan, the strict and responsible grandson of the local headman. Jomkhwan is tasked with keeping Yothin out of trouble during his probation. At first, the two clash due to their different backgrounds. Yothin finds the quiet village boring, while Jomkhwan sees Yothin as a spoiled troublemaker. As time passes, they start to understand each other, and Yothin begins to develop feelings for Jomkhwan.

== Cast ==
=== Main ===
- Suppapong Udomkaewkanjana (Saint) as Jomkhwan (Jom), the headman's grandson who supervises Yothin
- Nuttapart Tuntistinchai (Poom) as Yothin (Yo), a wealthy city boy sent to the countryside

=== Supporting ===
- Neilinyah Taweearayapat (Prae) as Kaewkanda
- Sarochinee as Mix Mathukorn
- Asavarid Pinitkanjanapun (Heng) as Theethat
- Promsiri Santisuk as Komet
- Jintara Sukapat (Mam) as Bussaban
- Noi Phongam as Jan
- Sakdikul Somlek as Yingyos
- Jirawat Wachirasarunpat (Wo) as Phaisan
- Chutima Naiyana as Anongnat
- Ing Asavanund as Tod
- BM Chanatip Aumpu as Ble
- Jittipat Suwannaluck as Fluke
- Suriyawit Thanomchaisanit (Yochi) as Por
- Rawintera Phanpatthana as Earn Araya

=== Guest ===
- Thanatad Darawichai (Ryu) as Pol (Ep. 4)
- Phusanu Wongsavanischakorn (Yoon) as Jiras
- Akadech Jaroonsot (Aon) as Zack
- Khwanruedi Klomklom as Waewdao
- Trin Settachoke as Jom's father
- Prombandal Phutharit as Kla

== Soundtrack ==
No.	Title	Artist	Length
1.	"เชื่อหัวใจ (Chuea Huachai)" (Theme song)	Por Arnop

== Production ==
The series was directed by Songsak Mongkolthong and produced by Idol Factory. Saint Suppapong Udomkaewkanjana also served as one of the producers. The music was composed by Teeraphong Prathumrat and Ekkaphop Khiaoyasit.

== Episodes ==
The series consists of 12 episodes, each approximately 45 minutes long. It aired weekly on Fridays from 16 May to 1 August 2025.

== Reception ==
A critic from TrueID described the series as a "sweet romantic comedy" that evokes memories of classic Thai dramas. The review noted the contrast between the city boy character Yothin and the rural setting, highlighting the chemistry between the leads as the main appeal of the show.
