= Interminable =

2025–26 Thai television series

- อสงไขย
- Genre: Boys' love, Drama, Fantasy, Romance
- Directed by: Mai Phawat Panangkasiri
- Country of origin: Thailand
- Original language: Thai language
- No. of seasons: 1
- No. of episodes: 12

Production
- Executive producers: Suppapong Udomkaewkanjana, Chen Kachen Sodpho
- Editor: Wasupol Sripuk
- Running time: 48 minutes
- Production company: Idol Factory

Original release
- Release: November 7, 2025 – January 23, 2026

Interminable (Thai: อสงไขย) is a 2025 Thai television series produced by Idol Factory. It was broadcast on Workpoint TV and released on streaming platforms iQIYI and YouTube. The series was directed by Phawat Panangkasiri (Mai), with executive production by Suppapong Udomkaewkanjana (Saint) and Kachen Sodpho (Chen).

== Synopsis ==
The story follows Yai, a nobleman whose spirit remains bound to an old house, waiting for the return of his beloved Kaewta. Centuries later, Kaewta is reborn as a dancer and revisits the same residence, awakening memories and emotions from past lives. The narrative explores themes of destiny, reincarnation, and eternal love.

== Cast ==
=== Main ===
- Babe Tanatat – Kaewta
- Billy Patchanon Ounsa-ard – "Yai" Samoe Jairat

=== Supporting ===
- Heng Asavarid Pinitkanjanapun – Saen
- Looknam Orthara Poolsak – Ruedee
- Prae Neilinyah Taweearayapat – Sophi
- Ki Niwat Naknuan – Kan
- Tom Ratchaneekorn Phanmanee – Chanphen (Kaewta's mother)
- Bie Teerapong Leowrakwong – Chao Phraya Naruebodin (Yai's adoptive father)
- Ampere Suttatip Wutchaipradit – Som
- Gap Jakarin Puribhat – Chai (Ruedee's older brother)
- R Arnuttaphol Sirichomsaeng – Sin
- Kantapoj Pattarapol – Chao Muen Srisarak (Yai's adoptive brother)

=== Guest ===
- Piya Wimouktayon – Son (Kaewta's father)

== Production ==
The series was announced by Idol Factory in 2025 as part of its expansion of large-scale BL titles. Direction was handled by Mai Phawat Panangkasiri, with editing by Wasupol Sripuk. Executive production was led by Saint Suppapong Udomkaewkanjana and Chen Kachen Sodpho.

== Broadcast ==
Interminable premiered on November 7, 2025, and concluded on January 23, 2026, with 12 episodes of approximately 48 minutes each. Episodes aired weekly on Fridays via Workpoint TV and were also available on iQIYI and Idol Factory's official YouTube channel.

== Reception ==
Interminable received notable coverage in Thai media. Kapook emphasized the reincarnation and destiny themes, while TrueID highlighted the chemistry between the leads and the tragic tone of the narrative. Komchadluek noted the production as part of Idol Factory's strategy to expand the BL market with more complex stories.

On rating platforms, the series scored 7.8/10 from over 900 votes on MyDramaList, and 9.8/10 from more than 5,600 reviews on iQIYI.
