= Illslick =

Thai rapper (born 1986)

Background information
- Born: Thikhamphon Wetthaisong; 28 November 1986 (age 39); Bangkok, Thailand
- Genre: Hip-hop
- Occupations: Rapper; songwriter; record producer; singer
- Instrument: Vocals
- Years active: 2008–present

Thikhamphon Wetthaisong (born November 28, 1986), known by his stage name Illslick, is a Thai rapper, singer, songwriter, and music producer. He is one of the independent hip-hop artists in Thailand's underground music scene.

== Early life ==
Wetchthaisong was born on November 28, 1986, in Khon Kaen Province, Thailand. As a child, he was nicknamed "Lert", before later adopting the name "Illslick" or "Ill", which became his stage name in the music industry.

His parents separated when he was young, and he was raised under the care of his aunt in Lampang Province. Later, he moved to Chiang Mai to attend high school, which marked an important period in his life — it was during this time that he began to enter the music scene and develop his skills in songwriting and rapping.

== Music career ==
Illslick began his journey as a rapper during his high school years. At that time, he and some seniors shared an interest in basketball and hip-hop music, which led them to form a group of friends with similar passions. Together, they started making hip-hop music seriously for about a year. The group eventually began recording in studios and producing their own independent album. Although some members later went their separate ways, this period marked the foundation of his musical path.

Later, Illslick got an opportunity to perform live on stage at an event, where his talent caught the attention of senior artists in the hip-hop scene. They invited him to collaborate on music projects, leading to his first released track, "I Need A Girl (Remix)", which gained moderate popularity. His breakthrough success came with the hit song "Rak Mia Thi Sud Nai Lok" ("Love My Wife the Most in the World").

On 30 September 2014, Illsick released Kiss (จูบ) which was a cover of Phatthaya Bunyarattaphan (พิทยา บุณยรัตพันธุ์)'s song which was released in 1965. As of 8 December 2025, it has 560,684,256 views on YouTube, being the 3rd most viewed Thai MV on YouTube.

In 7 Mar 2018, Illslick released Tha Thoe Tong Lueak (ถ้าเธอต้องเลือก). As of 8 December 2025, it has 538,291,059 views on YouTube, being the 6th most viewed Thai MV on YouTube.

== Discography ==
=== Studio Albums ===
Name	Details
โนอะพอโลจีส์ (No Apologies)	Release date: March 24, 2014; Label: Bahtbank Productions; Formats: CD, Vinyl, Digital Download, Streaming

== Awards ==
Year	Award	Category	Song	Status
2022	TOTY Music Awards 2021	Album of the Year	"หัวเราะใส่ฉัน"	Nominated
2022	TOTY Music Awards 2021	Most Popular Male Artist	"หัวเราะใส่ฉัน"	Nominated
2023	TOTY Music Awards 2022	Song of the Year	"พิพิธภัณฑ์"	Nominated
2023	TOTY Music Awards 2022	Most Popular Male Artist of the Year	"พิพิธภัณฑ์"	Nominated
