= Three Man Down =

Thai rock band

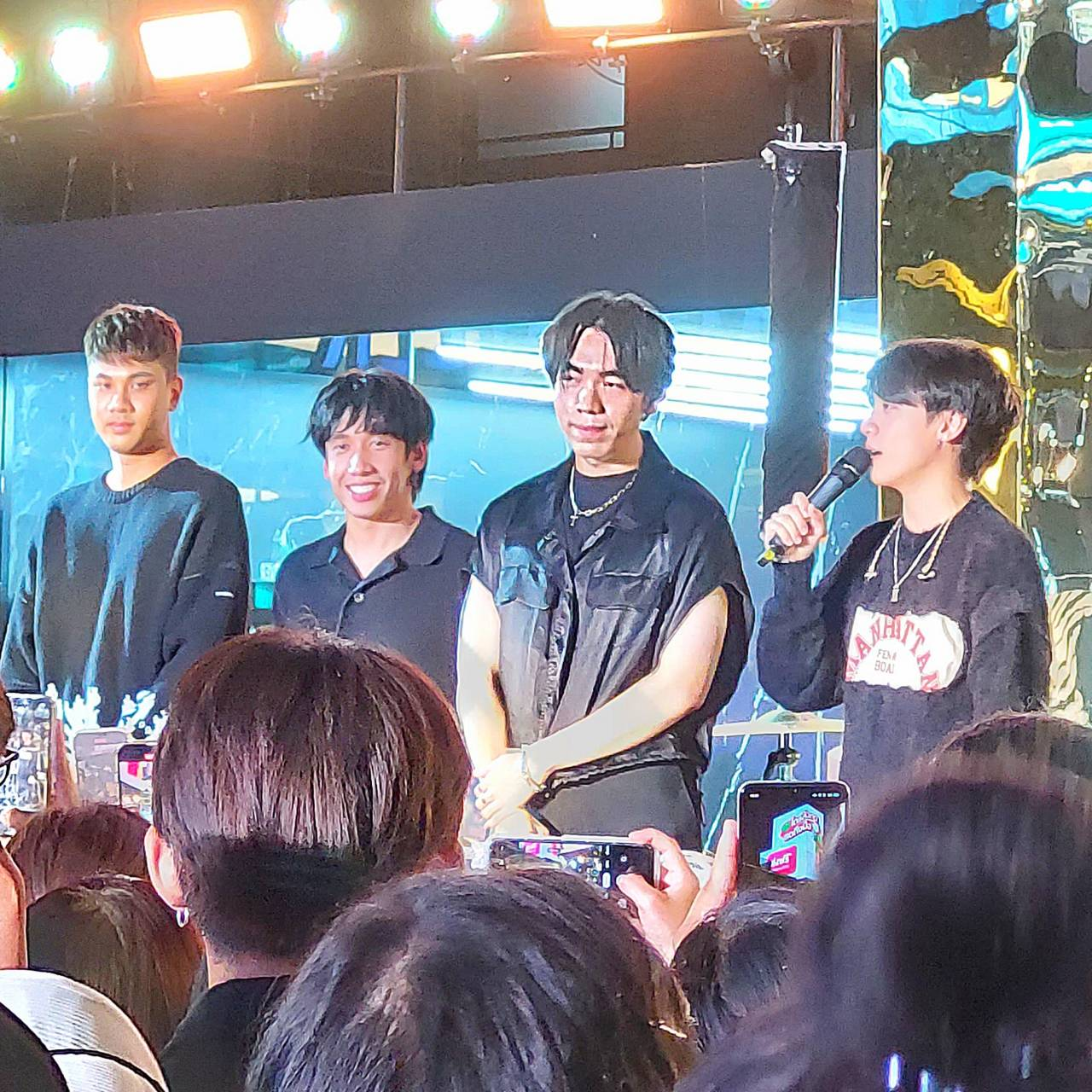
- Three Man Down in 2023; L–R: Toon, Thay, Seng, Krit

Background information
- Origin: Bangkok, Thailand
- Genres: Rock; pop rock
- Years active: 2013–present
- Labels: SRP Label (2016–2017); Gene Lab (2018–present)
- Members: Krit Jeerapattananuwong; Peerapon Iamjamrat; Thaythanan Wongpreechachok; Wisaruth Pratomsiripaisan
- Past members: Kittimed Chanpanit

Three Man Down (Thai: ทรีแมนดาวน์) is a Thai pop rock band formed by students from the School of Communication Arts at Bangkok University in 2013. They are signed to Gene Lab, a subsidiary of GMM Music.

== History ==
=== 2013–2018: Formation and first releases ===
Three Man Down was formed in 2013 by Krit Jeerapattananuwong, Thaythanan Wongpreechachok (Thay), Peerapon Iamjamrat (Toon), and Kittimed Chanpanit (Ohm)—four friends who met at Bangkok University, initially playing rock music. They performed in a number of music competitions before releasing their first single, "คำทำนาย", with a music video produced on a tight budget of just 20,000 THB. They later worked with SRP Label, releasing the songs "Hey Josh! (พรุ่งนี้ต้องลืมเธอ)" and "ของที่เธอไม่ต้องการ". However, the band struggled to establish a musical identity, leading to internal conflicts. Eventually, they collaborated with Soong Mattnimare, who became their producer and helped them refine their sound. They went on to release the tracks "Downtown Pop (อยากฟัง)" and "City (ข้างกัน)". Three Man Down continued releasing music independently until they competed in Band Lab, a talent search program initiated by Puntapol Prasarnrajkit (lead singer of Cocktail) under the newly established Gene Lab label. They won second place and signed a contract with Gene Lab.

=== 2018–2022: This City Won't Be Lonely Anymore ===
In March 2021, Three Man Down released their debut album, This City Won't Be Lonely Anymore, which included the singles "ผ่านตา", "ตอนไม่ได้เจอ", "ทีมรอเธอ","ไปเถอะเธอ", and "ข้างกัน (City)" (feat. ออม TELEx TELExs). Their major breakthrough came with the song "ฝนตกไหม", which reached number one on Spotify, Apple Music, and JOOX. Their next hit, "ฝันถึงแฟนเก่า", also climbed to number one on Spotify and Apple Music. In late 2020, they released "ถ้าเธอรักฉันจริง", which again reached number one on Spotify, Apple Music, and JOOX.

=== 2022–2025: 28, III ===
In July 2023, Three Man Down released their second studio album, 28, which marked a shift in both musical style and lyrical themes, highlighting the band's evolution.

In June 2025, the band issued their third studio album, III.

== Political and social involvement ==
=== Advocacy for the entertainment industry and COVID-19 vaccination ===
In 2021, Three Man Down publicly supported the Entertainment Venue Operators Association and the Musicians' Association of Thailand in their proposals aimed at reviving the entertainment industry and assisting musicians affected by government-imposed COVID-19 restrictions.

== Band members ==
Current

- Krit Jeerapattananuwong – lead vocals, rhythm guitar (2013–present)
- Peerapon Iamjamrat (Toon) – lead guitar (2013–present)
- Thaythanan Wongpreechachok (Thay) – drums (2013–present)
- Wisaruth Pratomsiripaisan (Seng) – keyboard, synthesizer (2013–present)

Past

- Kittimed Chanpanit (Ohm) – bass (2013–2022)

== Discography ==
- This City Won't Be Lonely Anymore (2021)
- 28 (2023)
- III (2025)
