= The Sign (TV series) =

2023–24 Thai television series

- ลางสังหรณ์
- Genre: Boys' love, Action, Drama, Fantasy, Mystery, Romance
- Based on: Premonition (ลางสังหรณ์) by I-Rain-Yia (ไอเรนเยีย)
- Directed by: Natthaphong Wongkaweepairod
- Country of origin: Thailand
- Original language: Thai language
- No. of seasons: 1
- No. of episodes: 12 (+1 special)

Production
- Executive producers: Kachen Sodpho, Suppapong Udomkaewkanjana
- Cinematography: Jintaphap Sakkaew
- Editor: Wasupol Sripuk
- Production company: Idol Factory

Original release
- Release: November 25, 2023 – February 10, 2024

The Sign (Thai: ลางสังหรณ์) is a 2023 Thai television series starring Patchanon Ounsa-ard (Billy) and Tanatat Phanviriyakool (Babe). It is adapted from the novel Premonition (ลางสังหรณ์) by I-Rain-Yia.

Directed by Natthaphong Wongkaweepairod and produced by Idol Factory, the series premiered on Channel 3 on November 25, 2023, and concluded on February 10, 2024, after 12 episodes. A special episode was released on May 26, 2024.

== Synopsis ==
Since childhood, Tharn (Tanatat Phanviriyakool) has had premonitions about people around him, sensing both good and evil. As part of a special investigation team, Tharn meets Phaya (Patchanon Ounsa-ard), a brilliant and charming officer, and feels an uncanny familiarity, as if they had known each other for a long time.

== Cast ==
=== Main ===
- Patchanon Ounsa-ard (Billy) as Phaya Kamolwipak / Sakuna Nopparuj
- Tanatat Phanviriyakool (Babe) as Wansa Raksil (Tharn)

=== Supporting ===
- Phongsakorn Sukiang (Tack) as Songyot Waliwan (Khem)
- Nuttapart Tuntistinchai (Poom) as Phathorn Phlengthai (Thongthai)
- Jakarin Puribhat (Gap) as Yingyai Mahanop (Yai)
- Pittikorn Siripornsawan (Surprise) as Lieutenant Singh
- Asavarid Pinitkanjanapun (Heng) as Chalothon
- Akarat Nimitchai (Akk) as Captain Akkhanee Assawawaisoon
- Orntara Poolsak (Looknam) as Chief forensic Mayris
- Yada Watcharamusik (May) as Nee Pharanee, Phaya's sister
- Kunyaphat Na Nakorn (Fay) as Dujdao
- Tassawan Seneewongse (Yo) as Tharn's grandmother
- Tarika Thidathit (Koi) as Phaya's grandmother

=== Guest ===
- Sarocha Chankimha (Freen) as Wansarat
- Kittipat Kaewcharoen (Kaownah) as Chat
- Suppapong Udomkaewkanjana (Saint) cameo
- Others

== Reception ==
The Sign was widely covered in Thai media and received strong audience response. Sanook described it as a large-scale BL mystery drama that combines investigative and romantic elements. TNN Thailand emphasized the chemistry between the lead actors and the balance between suspense and romance. Meanwhile, Kapook highlighted the fantasy and reincarnation themes that distinguish the series within the BL genre.

Audience ratings reinforced its popularity: on MyDramaList, the series holds a score of 8.0/10 from more than 13,000 users;on IMDb, it has a rating of 7.8/10 based on 667 reviews; and on iQIYI, the uncensored version scored 9.8/10 from over 6,600 users.

== Special episode ==
A special episode titled The Sign Special Episode Encore was released on May 26, 2024, featuring cast interviews and behind-the-scenes content.
