= List of Thai films =

This is an incomplete, chronological list of films produced in the cinema of Thailand. Many older films from Thailand have been lost.

For an alphabetical listing, see Category:Thai films.

== 1923–1949 ==
Title	Director	Actors	Genre	Notes
1923
Miss Suwanna of Siam	Henry MacRae	Sa-ngiam Navisthira, Yom Mongkhonnat, Mongkhon Sumonnat	Drama	First feature film made in Thailand.
1927
Chok Sawng Chun (Double Luck)				First all-Thai feature film.
1933
Romance in Mekong River (湄江情浪)	U.S. Hollywood director	Mr. Yuen Siu-Kit(元少傑), Ms. Woo Siu-Kwan, Ms. Lee Lai-Lin (李麗蓮), Mr. Anonymous, Ms. Lily Wu (伍莉莉), Ms. Lam Wai Fong (林蕙芳), Ms. Purple Jasmine (紫素馨), Ms. White Coral (白珊瑚)	Romance film	Bangkok produced Cantonese musical film.
1940
King of the White Elephant	Sunh Vasudhara	Renu Kritayakon, Suvat Nilsen	Historical drama	English-language feature, and the oldest complete Thai film in still in existence.
1949
Phanthaay Norasingh (Oarsman Norasingh)	Bhanu Yukol		Drama	Cinematography by Rattana Pestonji

== 1950s ==
Title	Director	Actors	Genre	Notes
1951
Took-gata jaa (Dear Dolly)	Rattana Pestonji			
1954
Kathoey Pen Het (It's All Because of a Kathoey)			Comedy	Re-discovered in 1993 as part of the Thai Film Archive's collection.
Santi-Weena	Tawee na Bangchang		Drama	Won awards at Asia Pacific Film Festival.
1955
Chuafah Din Salai (Dying Forever)	Tawee na Bangchang	Chana Sriubon, Ngamta Suphaphongs, Hem Sukasem, Prachuap Lukgamdi	Drama	
1957
Rong ram narok (Country Hotel)	Rattana Pestonji	Prachuap Lukgamdi, Chana Sriubon, Sarinthip Siriwan	Comedy drama	
1958
Chat Sua (Tiger Instinct)	Prateb Gomonpis	Mitr Chaibancha	Action	Mitr's debut.
Sawan Meud (Dark Heaven)	Rattana Pestonji	Sutape Wongkamheng, Seubneung Kanpai	Drama	

== 1960s ==
Title	Director	Actors	Genre	Notes
1961
Phrae Dum (Black Silk)	Rattana Pestonji	Ratanavadi Ratanabhand, Senee Wisaneesarn, Tom Wisawachart	Drama	Entered into the 11th Berlin International Film Festival
Roong Petch (Diamond Rainbow)		Sombat Metanee, Rattanaporn Intharakamhaeng		
Ruean Phae (Houseboat)	Bhanubandhu Yugala	Maria Jang, So Asanajinda, Chaiya Suriyan, Jinfong	Drama	
The Earth I Love	Chaluay Srirattana	Prachap, Amara Asavanont, Thanthat Vibhatayothin	Romantic drama	
1962
Banthuek Rak Pimchawee (Love Diary of Pimchawee)	Siri Sirichinda	Mitr Chaibancha, Petchara Chaowarat	Romance	First Mitr-Petchara film.
Skao Duen		Sombat Metanee		
1963
Gao Mungkohn (Nine Dragons)		Sombat Metanee		
Ngam-Ngon		Sombat Metanee		
Saming Sao		Sombat Metanee		
Pirattiya Ayawa		Pattawa Rangkwee		
Golong Palawang		Sombat Metanee		
Singh Sang Pa		Sombat Metanee		
1964
Tawan Lang Lued (Blood of the Sun)		Sombat Metanee		
Namtaan Mai Waan (Sugar Is Not Sweet)	Rattana Pestonji	Sombat Metanee, Metta Rungrattana	Drama	
Ngern Ngern Ngern (Money, Money, Money)		Mitr Chaibancha, Petchara Chaowarat	Musical comedy	Remade in 1985.
Singh lae Singh (The Lion vs The Lion)		Mitr Chaibancha, Sombat Metanee, Petchara Chaowarat		
1966
Phet Tat Phet (Operation Bangkok)	Vichit Kounavudhi, Khunawut Phankham, Prakob Kaewprasert	Mitr Chaibancha, Petchara Chaowarat	Action	
Suek Bang Rajan (The Battle of Bang Rajan)	Suphan Pramphan	Sombat Metanee	Action drama	Sombat won "Golden Doll" award for best actor.
1967
7 Phrakan	Charlie Intharavichit	Mitr Chaibancha	Action	
Top Secret	Vichit Kounavudhi	Mitr Chaibancha, Sombat Metanee		
1968
Chao Insee (The Eagle)	Datchani	Mitr Chaibancha, Phitsamai Wilaisak	Action	
Pet Noi (The Duckling)	Phanuphan	Suthisa Phathanut	Drama	

== 1970s ==
Title	Director	Actors	Genre	Notes
1970
Insee Thong (Golden Eagle)	Mitr Chaibancha	Mitr Chaibancha, Petchara Chaowarat	Action	Mitr Chaibancha was killed while filming a stunt for the final scene.
Khun Suk (The Warrior)		Sombat Metanee	Action	
Mae Ya Nang		Mitr Chaibancha, Phitsamai Wilaisak, Sopha Sathaphon	Drama	
Monrak luk thung (Thai: มนต์รักลูกทุ่ง, or Magical Love of the Countryside)	Rungsri Tassanapuk	Mitr Chaibancha, Petchara Chaowarat	Musical comedy	
Narok Tarutao (Tarutao, Devil's Island)		Sombat Metanee	Action	
1971
Ai Tui (Mr. Tui)	Dokdin Kanyamarn	Sombat Metanee, Petchara Chaowarat	Musical comedy	
Man Ma Kap Khwam Mued (Out of the Darkness)	Chatrichalerm Yukol	Sorapong Chatree, Naiyana Cheewanan	Science fiction	Chatrichalerm's debut feature and the first Thai science-fiction film.
1973
Dr. Karn (Khao Chue Karn)	Chatrichalerm Yukol	Sorapong Chatree	Drama	
Maimee Kamtob Jak Sawan (There’s No Answer from Heaven)		Sombat Metanee, Aranya Namwong		
Nai Suan Rak (Love Garden)	Ruj Ronaphop			
Petchakat Rak (Killer of Romance)				
Tah Tien	Sompote Sands	Sombat Metanee, Supak Likitkul		
1974
The 6 Ultra Brothers vs. the Monster Army	Sompote Sands; Shohei Tôjô	Ko Kaeoduendee		
Jumborg Ace & Giant	Sompote Sands	Chaiya Suriyan, Aranya Namwong, Sipeuak, Sri Suriya		
Choompae		Sombat Metanee	Action	
The Colonel (Mai Rak Pen Pan To)	Chatrichalerm Yukol	Ron Rittichai	Action	
Hotel Angel	Chatrichalerm Yukol	Sorapong Chatree, Viyada Umarin	Drama	
Tipchang		Sombat Metanee		
Bride of Happiness (A.K.A. The Magical Bride)	Saenyakorn-Porn Pairoj	Sombat Metanee	Comedy/Romance	
1975
Dangerous Modelling	Chatrichalerm Yukol			
Hanuman and the Five Riders	Sompote Sands	Yodchai Meksuwan, Thanyarat Lohanan, Akiji Kobayashi		
Last Love (Kaum Rak Krang Suthai)	Chatrichalerm Yukol		Drama	
Nuk Leng Tewada (The Holy Hoodlum)		Sombat Metanee	Action	
The Violent Breed (Thewada Doen Din)	Chatrichalerm Yukol			
1976
Angel Who Walks on the Ground	Chatrichalerm Yukol			
Magnum Killers		Sombat Metanee		
Sao 5 (Saturday Five)	Winit Phakdiwichit	Sorapong Chatree	Action	
S.T.A.B.	Chalong Pakdivijit	Sombat Metanee, Greg Morris		
Wai Onlawon	Piak Poster	Phairot Sangwaribut, Lalana Sulawan	Drama	
1977
Louie		Sombat Metanee		
Plae Chow (The Scar)	Cherd Songsri	Sorapong Chatree, Nantana Ngaograjang	Drama	
Taxi Driver (Citizen I)	Chatrichalerm Yukol		Drama	
Tongpan			Docu-drama	Was banned in Thailand on its initial release.
Checkmate	Chai Nimitchotinai	Krung Sriwilai, Sorapong Chatri	Action/Crime	
Yeh Nuat Sua (Operation Black Panther)	Sombat Metanee	Sombat Metanee	Action	
1978
First Wife (Mia Luang)	Vichit Kounavudhi		Drama	
Karma	Chatrichalerm Yukol			
Dong Yen	Charan Promrangsi	Sombat Metanee; Aranya Namwong		
1979
The Adventure of Sud Sakorn	Payute Ngaokrachang		Animation/Fantasy	First Thai animated feature.
Phra Rod Meree		Ampha Phusith, Toon Hirunyatrub, Supansa Nuerngpirom	Romance/Action/Fantasy	
Mountain People (Khon Phukao)	Vichit Kounavudhi		Drama	

== 1980s ==
Title	Director	Actors	Genre	Notes
1980
Golden Triangle		Sombat Metanee	Action	
Ka Kee	Nerramitr	Sorapong Chatree, Ampha Poosith	Fantasy/Drama	
Luang ta	Permphol Cheyaroon	Lor Tok		Entered into the 31st Berlin International Film Festival
Siang Sueng Thi San Sai (Banjo on the Sandbar)	Ban Saksri	Sombat Metanee	Drama	
The Yellowing of the Sky (Before the Storm)	Chatrichalerm Yukol			
Nong Tak Ya Heroes	Pornchai Siriratpanya	Sombat Metanee Piyamas Monyakul Wannee Preeda Manop Asawathep, Lak Aphichat, Rit Luecha, Singha Milinthrasai	Action	
A Pair Of Thieves (A.K.A. Couple Of Thieves)	Chai Meekunsut	Sorapong Chatri	Action	
Sang Theulan Pang Ya Aspangwa	Pornchai Siriratpanya	Pongkai Miyultee	Drama	
1982
If You Still Love	Chatrichalerm Yukol		Drama	
King Of Guns	Wisan Santisucha	Sombat Metanee	Action	
Angkor: Cambodia Express	Lek Kitiparaporn	Robert Walker, Jr.	Drama	
Son of the Northeast (Look Isan)	Vichit Kounavudhi		Drama	
1983
Gunman (Meu Peun)	Chatrichalerm Yukol	Sorapong Chatree	Drama	
1984
Detective, Section 123	Chatrichalerm Yukol		Crime drama	
Freedom of Taxi Driver (Citizen II)	Chatrichalerm Yukol	Sorapong Chatree	Drama	
The Story of Nampoo	Euthana Mukdasanit			
1985
Butterfly and Flowers	Euthana Mukdasanit	Suriya Yaowasang, Wasana Pholyiam		
Her Name is Boonrawd	Vichit Kounavudhi		Drama	
Magic Lizard	Sompote Sands	Lor Tok, Der Doksadao, Hiew Fah, Si Tao	Action	
1986
Somsee	Chatrichalerm Yukol			
1987
The Elephant Keeper (Khon Liang Chang)	Chatrichalerm Yukol	Sorapong Chatree	Drama	
1988				

== 1990s ==
Title	Director	Actors	Genre	Notes
1990
Song for Chao Phya	Chatrichalerm Yukol	Sorapong Chatree	Drama	
Kon Phan Du			Action	
1991
Powder Road	Chatrichalerm Yukol		Drama	
Rolling Stone	Somching Srisupap	Mos Patiparn		
The Dumb Die Fast, The Smart Die Slow	Manop Udomdej	Surasak Wongthai, Angkana Timdee, Kajornsak Rattananissai, Manop Asawatap	Thriller	
1992
The Magic Show (Rawng Tah Laep Plaep)	Prachya Pinkaew	Tat Na Takuatung, Bawriboon Chanreuang	Drama	
1993
Salween (Gunman II)	Chatrichalerm Yukol	Siricoup Metanee	Drama	
1994
Blackbirds at Bangpleng	Niratisai Kanjareuk		Science fiction	
Muen and Rid	Cherd Songsri	Jintara Sukaphat, Santisuk Promsiri	Romantic drama	
Once Upon a Time...This Morning	Bhandit Rittakol	Santisuk Promsiri, Chintara Sukapatana	Drama	Film Studio: Five Star Production
1995
Romantic Blue	Somchai Kemglad		Drama	
1996
Dangerous Years	Nopphorn Wathin	Chanit Yaisamer, Karen Klongtrudrok	Drama	
Daughter (Sia Dai)	Chatrichalerm Yukol	Nusara Prawanna, Johnny Anfone	Drama	
Sunset at Chao Phraya	Euthana Mukdasanit	Bird McIntyre	Drama	
1997
Dang Bireley's and Young Gangsters (2499 Antapan Krong Muang)	Nonzee Nimibutr	Jesdaporn Pholdee	Drama	Debut film by Nonzee.
Daughter 2 (Sia Dai 2)	Chatrichalerm Yukol	Marisa Anita, Sorapong Chatree	Drama	Thailand's selection for Best Foreign Language Film.
Fun Bar Karaoke	Pen-Ek Ratanaruang	Ray MacDonald	Crime comedy	Film Studio: Five Star Production Debut film by Pen-Ek; premiered at Berlin Film Festival.
Ta fa likit (Who Is Running?)	Oxide Pang		Drama	Thailand's selection for Best Foreign Language Film in 1998.
1998
"Crime King" (Suea Jone Phan Suea)	Tanit Jitnukul	Amphol Lumpoon, Dom Hetrakul, Art Supawatt Purdy, Supakorn Kitsuwon	Action/Adventure Based on True Story	
Destiny Upside Down (Thai: คนป่วนสายฟ้า; khon puan sai fa)	Udom Udomroj	Shahkrit Yamnam, Jessadaporn Pholdee, Sonia Couling, Billy Ogan	Comedy Drama	Film Studio: Five Star Production
Fah	Wych Kaosayananda		Drama	
O Negative (Rak awk baep mai dai)	Pinyo Roothum	Ray MacDonald, Chakrit Yamnam, Tata Young	Drama	
1999
6ixtynin9	Pen-Ek Ratanaruang	Lalita Panyopas	Crime drama	Thailand's selection for Best Foreign Language Film.
Bangkok Dangerous	The Pang Brothers		Crime drama	Hong Kong-Thailand co-production, debut film by the Pangs.
Nang Nak	Nonzee Nimibutr	Intira Jaroenpura	Horror	

== 2000s ==
=== 2000 ===
Title	Director	Actors	Genre	Notes
2000
Bang Rajan	Thanit Jitnukul	Winai Kraibutr	War	"Presented by Oliver Stone" in US.
Fah Talai Jone (Tears of the Black Tiger)	Wisit Sasanatieng	Chartchai Ngamsan	Western	Film Studio: Five Star Production Director's debut feature; first Thai film at Cannes.
The Iron Ladies (Satree lek)	Youngyooth Thongkonthun	Jesdaporn Pholdee	Comedy	
Mysterious Object at Noon (Dokfa nai meuman)	Apichatpong Weerasethakul		Art film	Director's debut feature.

=== 2001 ===
Title	Director	Actors	Genre	Notes
2001
Bangkok Haunted	Oxide Pang Chun, Pisut Praesangeam		Horror	
Body Jumper	Haeman Chatemee		Horror	
Goal Club	Kittikorn Liasirikun		Drama	
Jan Dara (Thai: จันดารา)	Nonzee Nimibutr	Suwinit Panjamawat, Christy Chung, Eakarat Sarsukh, Kanchit Thamthong, Santisuk Promsiri, Wipawee Charoenpura, Patharawarin Timkul, Wanlapa Promnaul, Jenjira Pongpas, Thana Komentiti, Sukanya Kongkawong, Sasithorn Panichnok, Nam-Nguen Boonnak, Niwat Pibulsiri, Pornprom Saibour	Drama romance	Jan Dara is a trilogy with: 1. Jan Dara (2001); 2. Jan Dara: The Beginning (2012); 3. Jan Dara: The Finale (2013)
Khang Lang Pap (Behind the Painting)	Cherd Songsri		Drama	
Killer Tattoo	Yuthlert Sippapak	Suthep Po-ngam	Action comedy	
Kwan Riam	Dulyasit Niyomgul; Sutthakorn Santithawat	Pakkaramai Potranan; Ninnart Sinchai	Romance	
Mae bia	Somching Srisuparp	Napakpapha Nakprasitte, Akara Amarttayakul	Horror romance	
Monrak Transistor	Pen-Ek Ratanaruang	Supakorn Kitsuwon	Comedy drama	
Som and Bank: Bangkok for Sale	Oxide Pang		Drama	
Suriyothai	Chatrichalerm Yukol		Historical drama	Re-edited for US release by Francis Ford Coppola

=== 2002 ===
Title	Director	Actors	Genre	Notes
2002
1+1=0 (Nothing to Lose)	Danny Pang	Arisara Wongchalee, Pierre Png	Crime	Solo directorial debut by Danny Pang.
999-9999	Peter Manus	Sririta Jensen, Julachak Jakrapong, Paula Taylor	Horror	
Blissfully Yours (Sud sanaeha)	Apichatpong Weerasethakul		Romance drama	Won the Un Certain Regard Prize at the 2002 Cannes Film Festival.
Butterfly Man	Kaprice Kea	Napakpapha Nakprasitte, Stuart Laing	Drama	English language.
Demonic Beauty (Krasue) (Thai: ตำนานกระสือ)	Bin Bunluerit	Akekaphan Bunluerit, Natthorn Somkanae, Nak-rob Traipoe, Lakana Wattanawongsiri, Pisamai Wilaisak	Horror/drama/fantasy	
Goodman Town (Phii hua khaat) (Thai:	Sakchai Sribonnam		Action	
Headless Hero (Phii hua khaat) (Thai: ผีหัวขาด)	Komsan Treepong	Note Chern-Yim, Jaturong Mokjok, Suthep Po-ngam, Natthamonkarn Srinikornchot	Comedy fantasy horror	
I-San Special	Mingmongkol Sonakul		Drama	Won FIPRESCI prize at Singapore International Film Festival.
Khon hen phi (The Eye)	The Pang Brothers	Angelica Lee	Horror	Hong Kong-Singapore-Thailand co-production
Mekhong Full Moon Party (Sibha kham doan sib ed) (Thai: ๑๕ ค่ำ เดือน ๑๑)	Jira Maligool	Anuchit Sapanpong	Comedy drama	
Saving Private Tootsie (Prom Chompoo)	Kittikorn Kiasirikun		Comedy drama	
Three	Nonzee Nimibutr		Horror	Thai-Korean-Hong Kong anthology film.

=== 2003 ===
Title	Director	Actors	Genre	Notes
2003
The Adventure of Iron Pussy (Hua Jai Tor Ra Nong)	Apichatpong Weerasethakul, Michael Shaowanasai	Michael Shaowanasai, Krissada Terrence	Musical Action Comedy	Only in Limited Theaters.
Angulimala	Suthep Tanniratana	Nopachai Jayanama	Fantasy drama	Entered into the 26th Moscow International Film Festival
Buppah Rahtree (Rahtree: Flower of the Night) (Thai: บุปผาราตรี)	Yuthlert Sippapak	Laila Boonyasak, Krit Sripoomseth, Chompunoot Piyapane, Sirisin Siripornsmathikul, Ampon Rattanawong, Somjai Sukjai, Sayan Meungjarern	Horror comedy drama	This is the first version of the film trilogy: 1. 2003 Buppah Rahtree; 2. 2009 Rahtree Reborn part 1; 3. 2009 Rahtree revenge part 2
Butterfly in Grey (Khang Paed)	Sananjit Bangsapan		Drama	
Chaya (Thai: ชายา	Torpong Tunkamhang	Kay Deutsch, Wannasa Thongviset, Panadda Wongphudee	Horror drama	
Cheerleader Queens	Poj Arnon			
Club Zaa (Club zaa: Pit tamraa saep) (Thai: คลับซ่า ปิดตำราแสบ)	Thanakorn Phanthawornnawin	Pharanyu Rojanawuthitham, Jate Glernpratum, Worrawith Kaewpetch, Chatthapong Phantana-Angkul, Yukonthorn Phinit, Sawinee Pookaroon, Supatchaya Reunreung, Wanida Termthanaporn, Jarupon Tuakhreu, Chatuchak Wangsuwankij, Boriwat Yuto	Comedy	
Fake	Thanakorn Pongsuwan	Pachrapa Chaichua, Kaneungnich Jaksamithanon, Ray MacDonald, Leo Putt, Phaophon Thephatdin Na Ayudhya	Romance	
Fan Chan (My Girl) (Thai: แฟนฉัน)	Vitcha Gojiew	Charlie Trairat, Focus Jirakul, Charwin Jitsomboon, Wongsakorn Rassamitat, Anusara Chantarangsi, Nipawan Taveepornsawan, Prem Tinsulanonda	Comedy romance	
February	Yuthlert Sippapak		Drama	
Last Life in the Universe (Ruang rak noi nid mahasan)	Pen-Ek Ratanaruang	Tadanobu Asano	Comedy drama	
Last Love	Chatrichalerm Yukol		Romance	Remake of 1975 film, also by Chatrichalerm.
OK Baytong	Nonzee Nimibutr		Comedy drama	
Ong-Bak: Muay Thai Warrior	Prachya Pinkaew	Tony Jaa	Martial arts	
One Night Husband)	Pimpaka Towira	Nicole Theriault, Siriyakorn Pukkavesh	Drama	
Sayew	Kongdej Jaturanrasamee, Kiat Songsanant	Pimpaporn Leenutapong	Comedy drama	
The Iron Ladies 2 (Satree lek 2)	Youngyooth Thongkonthun		Comedy	
Sexphone & the Lonely Wave	Hemant Chetmi	Kavee Tanjararak (Beam D2B) as Due; Paula Taylor as Jay	Comedy drama	Also known as The Girl Next Door
Sung horn (Omen)	Thammarak Kamuttmanoch		Drama	
Tawipop (The Siam Renaissance)	Surapong Pinijkhar		Romance	
Tropical Malady (Sud Pralad)	Apichatpong Weerasethakul	Sakda Kaewbuadee, Banlop Lomnoi	Romance drama	Won the Jury Prize at the 2004 Cannes Film Festival, the first Thai film to be in the main competition at Cannes.

=== 2004 ===
Title	Director	Actors	Genre	Notes
2004
Ai-Fak (The Judgement)	Pantham Thongsangl	Pitisak Yaowananon	Drama	Based on novel by Chart Korbjitti.
Art of the Devil (Khon Len Khong)	Tanit Jitnukul	Arisa Wills, Supakson Chaimongkol, Krongthong Rachatawan, Tin Settachoke, Somchai Satuthum, Isara Ochakul, Nirut Sutchart, Krittayod Thimnate	Horror	Film Studio: Five Star Production
(Bangkok Loco) Tawan Young Wan Yoo	Krissada Terrence	Krissada Terrence	Musical comedy	
Beautiful Boxer	Ekachai Uekrongtham	Asanee Suwan	Drama	Biography of transsexual boxer Nong Thoom.
The Bodyguard	Petchtai Wongkamlao	Petchtai Wongkamlao	Action comedy	
Citizen Dog	Wisit Sasanatieng	Mahasamut Boonyaruk, Saengthong Gate-Uthong	Comedy drama	Film Studio: Five Star Production
Garuda	Monthon Arayangkoon	Somram Teppitak, Sara Legge	Fantasy	
The Eye 2	The Pang Brothers		Horror	
Kerd ma lui (Born to Fight)	Panna Rittikrai	Dan Chupong	Martial arts	
Headless Hero 2 (Phii hua khaat 2) (Thai: ผีหัวขาด 2)	Komsan Treepong	Todsaporn Rottakit, Ubonwan Boonrod, Chonthicha Bunruangkhao, Taneth Shimtuam, Sornsutha Klunmalee, Saowaluck Siriaran, Pairoj Jaisingha, Deux Doksadao, Sayan Meungjarern, Somlek Sakdikul,	Comedy horror	
Hom rong (The Overture)	Ittisoontorn Vichailak	Anuchit Sapanpong	Musical drama	Official selection for the Academy Award for Best Foreign Language Film.
The Letter (Jod mai rak)	Pa-oon Chantornsiri	Anne Thongprasom	Romance drama	Remake of 1997 South Korean film, Pyeon ji.
The Sisters (Pee Chong Air)	Tiwa Moeithaisong			
MAID (Mission Almost Impossible Done (M.A.I.D)) (Thai: แจ๋ว)	Yongyoot Thongkongtoon	Pornchita Na Songkhla, Thienchai Jayasvasti Jr., Jarupus Pattamasiri, Jarunee Boonsake, Panalak Na Lumpang, Somlek Sakdikul, Russamee Thongsiripraisri, Panissara Phimpru, Paweenut Pangnakorn, Kasian Jarusomboon, Bonnie Zellerbach, Krystal Vee, Pongsanart Vinsiri	Comedy	
Pisaj (Evil)	Chukiat Sakweerakul	Pumwaree Yodkamol	Horror	
Sai Lor Fah (Pattaya Maniac)	Yuthlert Sippapak	Choosak Eamsuk	Comedy drama	
Sars Wars (Khun krabii hiiroh)	Taweewat Wantha	Supakorn Kitsuwon, Suthep Po-ngam	Science fiction comedy	
Shutter	Banjong Pisonthanakun, Parkpoom Wongpoom	Ananda Everingham	Horror	
The Sin (Choo)	Ong-Art Singlumpong	Sorapong Chatree, Helen Nima, Nirut Saosudchart, Andy Tangkaprasert	Thriller	
Zee-Oui	Buranee Rachjaibun, Nida Suthat Na Ayutthaya		Thriller	

=== 2005 ===
Title	Director	Actors	Genre	Notes
2005
Andaman Girl	Tanit Jitnukul		Comedy	
Art of the Devil 2 (Long khong)	Pasith Buranajan, Kongkiat Khomsiri, Isara Nadee, Seree Phongnithi, Yosapong Polsap, Putipong Saisikaew, Art Thamthrakul	Napakpapha Nakprasitte	Horror-thriller	Film Studio: Five Star Production
Ahingsa-Jikko mee gam (Ahimsa ... Stop to Run)	Kittikorn Kiasirikun	Boriwat Yuto	Comedy drama	Official selection for Academy Awards for 2006.
Beautiful Wonderful Perfect (Err Rer)	Poj Arnon	Choosak Eamsuk	Comedy drama	
Buppah Rahtree Phase 2: Rahtree Returns	Yuthlert Sippapak		Comedy horror	
Crying Tigers (Suea Rong Hai)	Santi Taepanich		Documentary	
Dear Dakanda (Phuen Sanit)	Komgrit Triwimol		Romantic comedy	
Dek Daen				
Ghost of Mae Nak (นาค รักแท้)	Mark Duffield	Pataratida Pacharawirapong, Siwat Chotchaicharin, Porntip Papanai, Jaran Ngamdee, Kowit Wattanakul, Karnjanaporn Plodpai, Meesak Nakarat, Marasri Issarangkul Na Ayuttaya	Horror	
Ghost Variety (Variety phee chalui) (Thai: วาไรตี้ผีฉลุย)	Adirek Wattaleela	Petchtai Wongkamlao, Bawriboon Chanreuang, Channarong Khuntee-tao, Sayan Meungjarern, Wachara Pan-Iom, Phitchanat Sakhakon, Somlek Sakdikul, Chaleumpol Tikumpornteerawong	Comedy horror	
Innocence	Areeya Chumsai, Nisa Kongsri		Documentary	Acclaimed independent film about hill tribe schoolchildren in northern Thailand.
Midnight My Love(Cherm)	Kongdej Jaturanrasamee	Petchtai Wongkamlao Pongsak Pongsuwan	Comedy	
Necromancer (Jom kha mung wej)	Piyapan Choopetch	Chatchai Plengpanich	Fantasy	
P (The Possessed) (Thai: ผ)	Paul Spurrier	Suangporn Jaturaphut, Dean Barrett, Shaun Delaney, John Kathrein, Chartchai Kongsiri, Opal, Pisamai Pakdeevijit, Supatra Roongsawang, Narisara Sairatanee, Amy Siriya, Paul Spurrier, Pattanachat Sritep, Manthana Wannarod, Kochakorn Wongkitisopon, Dor Yodrak	Drama Horror	
Scared (Rab Nong Sayong Kwan)	Pakphum Wonjinda		Horror	
The Holy Man (Luang phii theng)	Note Chern-Yim			
The King Maker	Lek Kitaparaporn	Gary Stretch	Historical drama	English language.
The Remaker (Kon raruek chat)	Mona Nahm		Drama	Remake of Oxide Pang's Who Is Running?
The Tiger Blade (Seua Khaap Daap)	Theeratorn Siriphunvaraporn		Action	
The Tin Mine	Jira Maligool		Historical drama	Official submission for Academy Award.
Tom-Yum-Goong	Prachya Pinkaew	Tony Jaa	Martial arts	Release in US as The Protector.
Wai Onlawon 4: Tum & Oh Return (Oops ... There's Dad)	Rutaiwan Wongsirasawad			Sequel to hit 1976 teen romantic comedy.
Werewolf in Bangkok	Viroj Thongsiew	Choosak Eamsuk	Comedy horror	
Yam Yasothon (Hello Yasothon)	Petchtai Wongkamlao	Petchtai Wongkamlao	Musical comedy	

=== 2006 ===
Title	Director	Actors	Genre	Notes
2006
13 Beloved / 13: Game of Death (13 game sayawng) (Thai: 13 เกมสยอง)	Chukiat Sakveerakul	Krissada Terrance, Krissada Sukosol, Achita Sikamana, Sarunyu Wongkrachang, Nattapong Arunnate, Namfon Pakdee, Piyapan Choopech, Philip Wilson, Sukanya Kongkawong, Nakarin Triemmareng, Chano Pemberger, Stuart Nombluez, Suttipong Satjachoktam, Nuttakrit Boonannatanasarn, Chanunpong Peungrargdee, Pasnani Chinsatapornchok	Horror thriller	
Cadaver (sop) (Thai: ศพ)	Dulyasit Niyomgul	Natthamonkarn Srinikornchot, Nirut Sirijanya, Komgrich Yuttiyong	Horror	
Chai Lai (Dangerous Flowers)	Poj Arnon	Bongkoj Khongmalai	Action comedy	
Colic: The Movie (Colic: dek hen pee) (Thai: เด็กเห็นผี)	Patchanon Thammajira	Pimpan Chalaikupp, Vittaya Wasukraipaisan, Kulthida Sattabongkoch	Mystery Horror	
Delivery Sexy Love (Phaanjit Bit Raboet Rak)	Simon Chotianund		Romantic comedy	
Dorm (Dek hor) (Thai: เด็กหอ)	Songyos Sugmakanan	Charlie Trairat, Chintara Sukapatana, Sirachuch Chienthaworn	Horror thriller	film studio: GMM Tai Hub
Dynamite Warrior (Kon fai bin or Tabunfire)	Chalerm Wongpim	Dan Chupong	Martial arts	
Invisible Waves	Pen-Ek Ratanaruang	Tadanobu Asano	Thriller	Film Studio: Five Star Production
Just Friend (Khae pheuan kha phaw) (Thai: แค่เพื่อนค่ะพ่อ)	Verapong Kanchananit	Apichart Chusakul, Thanamit Reuanghiran, Phrompon Sithimongkol, Kanokwan Thananchai	Comedy Drama	
Khan Kluay	Kompin Kemgumnird		Historical comedy drama	First Thai computer-animated feature.
Khao Chon Kai	Withit Kamsrakaew		Comedy	
Krasue Valentine	Yuthlert Sippapak		Comedy horror	
Legend of Sudsakorn		Charlie Trairat	Historical fantasy	Based on story by Sunthorn Phu.
The Letters of Death (Khian Pen Song Daai)	Kapon Thongphlap		Horror thriller	
Loveaholic (Khoht-rak-eng-loei)	Ping Lumpraploeng		Romantic comedy drama	
Mercury Man	Bhandit Thongdee		Superhero action	
Metrosexual (Gang chanee gap ee-aep) (Thai: แก๊งชะนีกับอีแอบ)	Youngyooth Thongkonthun	Patcharasri Benjamas, Meesuk Jaengmeesuk, Pimolwan Suphayang, Kulnadda Pachimsawat, Orpreeya Hunsat, Thienchai Jayasvasti Jr., Kazuki Yao, Dawido Dorigo, Moncheep Siwasinanggoon, Kanit Sarasin, Sansanee Smanworawong, Michael Shaowanasai, Somphob Chumwongchoti, Pongsak Ditsayadech,	Romantic comedy drama	
Mor 8	Yongyuth Pinitpong		Comedy	
Navy Boys (Nam prik lhong rua)	Worapoj Pothineth		Comedy	
Noodle Boxer (Sab Sanit)	Rerkchai Paungpetch		Comedy	
Noo Hin: The Movie	Komgrit Triwimol		Comedy	
Nong Teng Nakleng-pukaotong	Panich Sodsee		Comedy	
The Last Song (Phleng sudthai)	Phisan Akraseranee		Drama	
The Passion (Ammahit Phitsawat)	Sarunyu Wongkrachang	Bongkoj Khongmalai	Thriller	
The Possible (Kao ... Kao)	Witthaya Thongyooyong	Joey Boy	Musical comedy	
Ruk Jung (The Memory)	Haeman Chatemee	Paula Taylor	Romantic comedy	
Seasons Change			Romantic comedy	
Thai Thief (Thai Theep)	Pisut Praesangeam	Suthep Po-ngam	Comedy	
The Gig	Theeratorn Siriphunvaraporn		Romantic comedy	
The Unseeable	Wisit Sasanatieng		Horror thriller	
Vengeance (Phairii Phinaat Paa Mawrana)	Preaw Sirisuwan		Horror fantasy	
The Victim	Monthon Arayangkoon	Pitchanart Sakakorn	Horror thriller	

=== 2007 ===
Title	Director	Actors	Genre	Notes
2007
Alone	Banjong Pisanthanakun, Parkpoom Wongpoom	Marsha Wattanapanich, Vittaya Wasukraipaisan, Rachanu Boonchuduang, Hatairat Egereff, Rutairat Egereff, Namo Tongkumnerd, Chutikan Vimuktananda, Nimit Luksameepong, Yupawan Unnataravarangkool, Michel Sardou, Taechit Mingmongkol, Pornchai Piboontanakeat, Amornrat Piboonthanakiat, Prasert Vivattanananpong	Horror thriller	
Fighting Beat / FB Fighting Beat (Thai: อก 3 ศอก 2 กำปั้น)	Piti Jaturaphat	David Bueno, Peerawat Herabat, Nattanun Jantarawetch, Andrew Koji, Nahatai Lekbumrung, Lex Luther, Tim Man, Micky Nowacki, Sura Sankum, Amornrit Sriphung, Pemanee Sungkorn, Than Thanakorn, Sura Theerakon	Action	
Bangkok Love Story	Poj Arnon	Rattanaballang Tohssawat, Chaiwat Thongsaeng, Wiradit Srimalai, Chutcha Rujinanon, Uthumporn Silaphan, Sahatchai Churum Na Ayudthaya, Cholprakran Chanruang, Rachanu Boonchuduang, Suchao Pongwilai, Ratchanong Suprakorb, Nakarin Kangwanchokechai, Apichai Youangthong	Drama	
The Bedside Detective (Sailap jap baan lek) (Thai: สายลับจับบ้านเล็ก )	Komgrit Triwimol	Sunny Suwanmethanont, Pattarasaya Kreuasuwansri, Panissara Phimpru, Chaleumpol Tikumpornteerawong, Prakasit Bowsuwan, Nimit Luksameepong, Sumeth Ong-ard, Jarupus Pattamasiri, Daraneenuch Photipit	Romantic comedy	
Body (Body sob 19) (Thai: บอดี้ ศพ #19)	Paween Purikitpanya	Arak Amornsupasiri, Ornjira Lamwilai, Kritteera Inpornwijit, Patharawarin Timkul, Paramej Noiam	Drama Horror Mystery	
Bus Lane (May narok muay yok law) (Thai: เมล์นรกหมวยยกล้อ)	Kittikorn Liasirikun	Udom Taephanit, Kiat Kitjaroen, Suthep Po-ngam, Naowarat Yuktanan, Sriphan Chunechomboon, Arisara Wongchalee, Khomsan Nanthajit, Prinya Ngamwongwarn, Anchana Phetjinda, Achita Sikamana, Theeratorn Siriphunvaraporn, Boriwat Yuto	Action Comedy	
The Bodyguard 2	Petchtai Wongkamlao	Petchtai Wongkamlao	Action comedy	
Final Score	Soraya Nagasuwan		Documentary	
Ghost Station	Yuthlert Sippapak		Comedy horror	
Ghost Mother (Thai: ผีเลี้ยงลูกคน)	Theeratorn Siriphunvaraporn	Natnischa Cerdchoobuphakaree, Patcharapa Chaichua, Focus Jirakul, Thanakorn Pisanupoom, Thana 'Oil' Suthikamorn, Kowit Wattanakul	Horror	
Haunting Me (หอแต๋วแตก; Hor Taew Tak)	Poj Arnon	Chaiwat Thongsaeng, Jaturong Mokjok, Sukonthawa Koetnimit,	Comedy horror	Film Studio: Five Star Production Sequels: Oh My Ghosts! 2 2009 Oh My Ghost! 3 2011
The Haunted Drum		Woranut Wongsawan,		Horror drama
In Country Melody (Isam Samawang)	Note Chern-Yim		Musical comedy	
The Life of Buddha			Drama	Release expected on December 5; would be the third feature-length animated film in Thai cinema history.
The Love of Siam (Thai: รักแห่งสยาม)	Chukiat Sakveerakul	Mario Maurer, Witwisit Hiranyawongkul	Romantic drama	
King Naresuan	Chatrichalerm Yukol		Historical drama	Trilogy of films.
Kung Fu Tootsie	Jaturong Mokjok	Sittichai Pabchompoo, Pokchut Tiumchai	Comedy	
Lullabye Before I Wake	Nate Pantumsinchai	Dean Shelton, Maiara Walsh	Romantic drama	Screened only at Lido Theaters.
Ma Mha	Pantham Thongsangl		Comedy drama	First Thai live-action film with an all-animal cast.
Me ... Myself (Thai: ขอให้รักจงเจริญ; Khaw hai rak jong jaroen)	Pongpat Wachirabunjong	Ananda Everingham, Chayanan Manomaisantiphap, Monton Annupabmard, Puttachat Pongsuchat, Piya Wimookdayon, Treepon Promsuwan, Direk Amattayakul, Kamol Chatrasen, Maria Dissayanand	Romantic drama	Directorial debut by actor Pongpat.
Muay Thai Chaiya	Kongkiat Khomsiri	Akara Amarttayakul, Thawatchai Penpakdee, Sonthaya Chitmanee	Muay Thai boxing drama	Premiered as closing film at 2007 Bangkok International Film Festival.
Nong Teng kon maha hia	Pongsak Pongsuwan, Choosak Iamsuk	Pongsak Pongsuwan, Choosak Iamsuk	Comedy	
Opapatika	Thanakorn Pongsuwan	Pongpat Wachirabanjong, Leo Putt, Somchai Kemklad, Chakrit Yaemnam, Ray MacDonald, Athip Nana, Nirut Sirijanya, Khemapsorn Sirisukka	Fantasy	
Pleasure Factory	Ekachai Uekrongtham	Yang Kuei-mei, Ananda Everingham	Drama	Premiered at 2007 Cannes Film Festival, official selection, Un Certain Regard, Singaporean co-production
Ploy (พลอย)	Pen-Ek Ratanaruang	Lalita Panyopas	Drama	Film Studio: Five Star Production Premiered at Director's Fortnight at 2007 Cannes Film Festival, had to be re-edited for release in Thailand because of censorship concerns about the sex scenes.
Ponglang Amazing Theater (Ponglang Sading Lumsing Sai Na)	Rerkchai Paungpetch	Ponglang Sa-on	Comedy-horror	Released November 29.
Seven Days to Leave My Wife (Yang Ngai Gaw Rak)	Torpong Tunkamhang	Samapon Piyapongsiri, Suwatjanee Chaimusik, Benjawan Artner, Prinya Rhunprapan	Comedy drama	
Sick Nurses (Suay Laak Sai)	Piraphan Laoyont, Thatsaporn Siriwat		Horror comedy	
The Screen at Kamchanod (Phee Jang Nang)	Songsak Mongkolthong	Achita Pramotch Na Ayuthaya, Pakramai Potrananda, Namo Tongkumnerd	Horror	Based on a true story. Released December 5.
The Sperm (Asujaak)	Taweewat Wantha	Leo Putt	Science fiction	
Spiritual World (Winyarn Loke Khon Tai)			Horror	
Syndromes and a Century	Apichatpong Weerasethakul	Nantarat Sawaddikul, Jaruchai Iamaram, Sophon Pukanok, Jenjira Pongpas	Romantic drama	Premiered at the 2006 Venice Film Festival. Withdrawn from 2007 release in Thailand by director, due to cuts requested by Board of Censors.
VDO Clip	Pakphum Wonjinda		Slasher horror	
Vow of Death			Comedy horror	

=== 2008 ===
Title	Director	Actors	Genre	Notes
2008
4bia (See Prang) (Thai:4แพร่ง)	Youngyooth Thongkonthun, Banjong Pisanthanakun, Parkpoom Wongpoom, and Paween Purikitpanya	Laila Boonyasak, Maneerat Kham-uan, Apinya Sakuljaroensuk, Witawat Singlampong, Pongsatorn Jongwilat	Horror	
April Road Trip (Khu kuan puan mesa) (Thai: คู่ก๊วนป่วนเมษา)	Vorawit Phonginsee	Kohtee Aramboy, Suteerush Channukool, Sombat Metanee, Achita Sikamana	Comedy	
Art of the Devil 3	Ronin Team	Napakpapha Nakprasitte, Supakorn Kitsuwon	Horror	Film Studio: Five Star Production
Boonchu 9 (Thai: บุญชู 9)	Bhandit Rittakol	Apinya Sakuljaroensuk, Santisuk Promsiri, thanachat tullayachat, jintara sukkhaphat	Drama	(Filmserie) (Boonchu 6,7,9,10)
Burn (Khon fai luk) (Thai: คนไฟลุก)	Peter Manus	Prangthong Changdham, Suteerush Channukool, Bongkoj Khongmalai, Ashiraya Peerapatkunchaya	Thriller	
Busaba Bold and Beautiful (Suay sink krating zab) (Thai: สวย สิงห์ กระทิง แซ่บ)	Pisut Praesangeam	Supakorn Kitsuwon, Suvanant Kongying	Comedy	
Chocolate	Prachya Pinkaew	Nitcharee Wismitanant	Martial arts, Action Drama	Debut film for Nitcharee.
Coming Soon (program na winyan akat) (Thai: โปรแกรมหน้าวิญญาณอาฆาต)	Sophon Sakdaphisit	Vorakarn Rojjanavatchra, Chantavit Dhanasevi, Sarinrat Thomas, Thanatorn Oudsahakul, Wanchat Kwangmuang, Oraphan Arjsamat, Padiphat Kanokamornsin, Nattaphol Worachalad, Wittawat Jalayondeji, Thanaporn Amornsin, Adisorn Trisirikasem	Horror Thriller	
First Flight	Tanit Jitnukul	Sornram Teppitak, Tom Claytor	Historical drama	Based on the formation of the Royal Thai Air Force.
Friendship ( Friendship: Theu kap chan) (Thai: เธอกับฉัน)	Chatchai Naksuriya	Mario Maurer, Apinya Sakuljaroensuk, Chaleumpol Tikumpornteerawong, Jetrin Wattanasin	Romantic drama	
Ghost-in-Law (Saphai Breu... Aw Aw) (Thai: สะใภ้บรื๋อ..อ์อ์)	Tanit Jitnukul, Seree Phongnithi		Comedy horror	
The 8th Day (Thai: แปดวัน แปลกคน)	Chadchai Yoodsaranee	Vasana Chalakorn, Jennis Oprasert, Thanawetch Siriwattanakul	Thriller	
The Ghost and Master Bo		Jaturong Jokmok	Comedy horror	
The Happiness of Kati			Drama	Based on S.E.A. Write Award-winning novel by Ngarmpun Vejjajiva.
Happy Birthday (Thai: แฮปปี้เบิร์ธเดย์ )	Pongpat Wachirabunjong	Ananda Everingham, Zerina Veesanun, Chayanan Manomaisantiphap, Antwone Rommayanun	Romantic drama	6 Nominations: 2009 Thailand National Film Association Award for Best: Actress, Actor, Director, Best Screenplay, Cinematography, Best Original Score, Picture Price: Thailand National Film Association Award for Best Actor 2009
Handle Me With Care (Kod)	Kongdej Jaturanrasamee	Kiatkamol Lata, Supaksorn Chaimongkol		
Hormones (Pid Term Yai Huajai Wawun) (Thai: ปิดเทอมใหญ่หัวใจว้าวุ่น)	Songyos Sugmakanan	Charlie Trairat, Focus Jirakul, Sora Aoi, Sirachuch Chienthaworn, Chantavit Dhanasevi, Ting Wei Lu, Ungsumalynn Sirapatsakmetha, Ratchu Surachalas, Chutima Teepanat, Thaniya Ummaritchoti	Romantic comedy	
Mum Deaw		Petchtai Wongkamlao	Comedy	
Nak		Petchtai Wongkamlao (voice)	Animated adventure	Adaptation of Mae Nak, ghost story of the Thai folklore.
Ong Bak 2	Tony Jaa	Tony Jaa	Martial arts	Directorial debut by Tony Jaa.
Queens of Langkasuka	Nonzee Nimibutr	Dan Chupong, Ananda Everingham	Historical fantasy	Written by two-time S.E.A. Write Award winner Win Lyovarin.
Salad Ta Diaw	Tanit Jitnukul	Narawan Techaratanaprasert	Action comedy	
Siyama: Village of Warriors	Preecha Songsakul		Historical fantasy-action	
Soi Cowboy	Thomas Clay	Nicolas Bro, Pimwalee Thampanyasan, Art Supawatt Purdy	Drama	
Soul's Code	Atsajun Sattakovit	Nattakorn Devakula	Crime thriller-horror	
Valentine (Kris ka Ja)		Chakrit Yamnam	Comedy	
Where the Miracle Happens	Siripakorn Wongchariyawat	Princess Ubolratana Rajakanya	Drama	Acting debut of Princess Ubolratana.
Woh Mah Ba Maha Sanook	Bunjong Sinthanamongkolkul	Anuwat Tarapan	comedy	

=== 2009 ===
Title	Director	Actors	Genre	Notes
2009
Bangkok Traffic (Love) Story (Rot fai faa... Maha na ter) (Thai: รถไฟฟ้ามาหานะเธอ)	Adisorn Tresirikasem	Cris Horwang, Theeradej Wongpuapan, Ungsumalynn Sirapatsakmetha	Romantic comedy	
Best of Times	Yongyoot Thongkongtoon	Arak Amornsupasiri, Yarinda Bunnag, Krissana Sreadthatamrong, Sansanee Wattananukul	Romantic drama	Thailand's submission for the Academy Award for Best Foreign Language Film
Dear Galileo (2009 film) (Nee Dtaam Galileo) (Thai: หนีตามกาลิเลโอ)	Nithiwat Tharathorn	Cody Damon, Jarinporn Joonkiat, Ray MacDonald, Adele Heather Taylor, Chutima Teepanat, Thaniya Ummaritchoti	Comedy Drama Romance	
Death Happens (Dtaai Mai Daai Dtaai) (Thai: 6-66 ตายไม่ได้ตาย)	Taklaew Rueangrat	Sakda Kaewbuadee, Yodchai Meksuwan, Susira Angelina Naenna, Jason Young	Horror	
Fireball	Thanakorn Pongsuwan	Preeti Barameeanat, Khanutra Chuchuaysuwan, Kumpanat Oungsoongnern	Action	
Haunted Universities (Mahalai sayongkwan) (Thai: มหาลัยสยองขวัญ)	Bunjong Sinthanamongkolkul, Sutthiporn Tubtim	Atis Amornwetch, Pantila Fuglin, Panward Hemmanee, Prinya Ngamwongwarn, Ashiraya Peerapatkunchaya, Pangsit Piseesotgan, Anna Reese	Horror	
Ja-eh goy laew ja (Thai: จ๊ะเอ๋ โกยแล้วจ้า)	Nati Phunmanee	Treechada Petcharat, Somlek Sakdikul, Seksan Sutthijanth, Rahtree Wittawat	Comedy	
Khan Kluay 2	Taweelap Srivuthivong	Anne Thongprasom, Uttaporn Teemakorn, Nonzee Nimibutr	Animation	
Meat Grinder (Cheuuat gaawn chim) (Thai: เชือดก่อนชิม)	Tiwa Moeithaisong	Mai Charoenpura, Rattanaballang Tohssawat, Wiradit Srimalai, Atitaya Shindejanichakul, Pimchanok Luevisadpaibul, Somlek Sakdikul, Chaiyot Tushsanasuwan, Shiny Khunthong, Somchat Prachathai, Thanatorn Oudsahakul, Jiratchaya Jirarajagit, Kittiphit Tamrongweenijchai, Archan Chaisuwan, Arachaporn Ngarmthed, Akradech Maneeploypech	Horror	
Mundane History	Anocha Suwichakornpong	Phakpoom Surapongsanuruk, Arkaney Cherkam, Paramej Noiam, Anchana Ponpitakthepkijo	Drama	Won the Tiger Award at the 2010 International Film Festival Rotterdam.
My Ex (Thai: แฟนเก่)	Piyapan Choopetch	Shahkrit Yamnarm, Wanida Termthanaporn, Nawadee Mokkhawesa, Atthama Chiwanitchaphan, Bordin Duke	Horror	
Nymph	Pen-Ek Ratanaruang			Competing in the Un Certain Regard section at the 2009 Cannes Film Festival
Phobia 2 (Ha phraeng) (Thai: ห้าแพร่ง)	Banjong Pisanthanakun, Visute Poolvoralaks	Jirayu La-ongmanee, Ray MacDonald, Chumphorn Thepphithak, Apasiri Nitibhon, Worrawech Danuwong, Gacha Plienwithi, Sarinrat Thomas, Chartpawee Treechawanvong, Charlie Trairat, Suteerush Channukool, Akiko Ozeki, Theeraneth Yuki Tanaka, Danaipat Labpipat, Nicole Theriault, Peeratchai Roompol, Marsha Wattanapanich, Nimitr Lugsameepong	Comedy Fantasy horror	
Power Kids	Krissanapong Rachata	Johnny Trí Nguyễn, Nanthawut Boonrubsub, Sasisa Jindamanee	Action film	
Rahtree Reborn, (Buppah Rahtree 3.1) (Thai: บุปผาราตรี 3.1)2	Yuthlert Sippapak	Mario Maurer, Laila Boonyasak, Santisuk Promsiri, Nudtawat Saksiri, Chantana Kittiyapan, Somlek Sakdikul, Aang Terdterng, Saichia Wongwirot, Piya Chanasattu, Supapit Kokphon, Yosawat Sitiwong, Sakchai Sriboonnark, Chaiyong Prison, Thongkam Phumpipat, Nicolas Giyasov	Horror comedy	This is the second version of the film trilogy: 1. 2003 Buppah Rahtree; 2. 2009 Rahtree Reborn (part 1); 3. 2009 Rahtree revenge (part 2)
Rahtree Revenge, Buppah Rahtree 3.2 (Thai: บุปผาราตรี 3.2)	Yuthlert Sippapak	Mario Maurer, Laila Boonyasak, Santisuk Promsiri, Nudtawat Saksiri, Chantana Kittiyapan, Somlek Sakdikul, Aang Terdterng, Piya Chanasattu, Supapit Kokphon, Yosawat Sitiwong, Kom Chauncheun, Apisit Opasaimlikit, Suchao Pongwilai, Jonathan Samson, Cheathavuth Watcharakhun	Horror	This is the truth version of the film trilogy: 1. 2003 Buppah Rahtree; 2. 2009 Rahtree Reborn (part 1); 3. 2009 Rahtree revenge (part 2)
Secret Sunday	Pen-Ek Ratanaruang	James Alexander, Siraphun Wattanjinda	Horror film	

== 2010s ==
=== 2010 ===
Title	Director	Actors	Genre	Notes
2010
8E88 Fan Lanla (Thai: 8E88 แฟนลั้ลลา)	Viroj Thongsiew	Note Chern-Yim, Uttama Chiwanichpan, Udom Chouncheun, Jaturong Mokjok	Comedy	
Bangkok Knockout	Panna Rittikrai	Jonathon Siminoe		
Best Supporting Actor (Thai: อยากได้ยินว่ารักกัน)	Alongkod Euepaiboon	Thongpoom Siripipat, Sakuntala Thianphairot, Phaibunkiat Khiaogao, Pairoj Jaisingha, Nawapol Lumpoon	Romance Drama	
Boonchu 10, (Thai: บุญชู 10)	Kiat Kitjaroen	Santisuk Promsiri, Chintara Sukapatana, Thanachat Tullayachat, Natthaweeranuch Thongmee	Romance Comedy	(Filmserie) (Boonchu 6,7,9,10)
Edge of the Empire	Nirattisai Kaljareuk	Ad Carabao, Alisa Sontirod, Arnut Rapanit	Historical epic	
Eternity	Bhandevanov Devakula	Ananda Everingham, Laila Boonyasak, Teerapong Liaorakwong	Romance	
First Love / A Crazy Little Thing Called Love (Sing lek lek tee reak wa rak) (Thai: สิ่งเล็กเล็ก ที่เรียกว่า)	Puttipong Pormsaka Na-Sakonnakorn, Wasin Pokpong,	Mario Maurer, Pimchanok Leuwisedpaiboon, Tangi Namonto, Yanika Thongprayoon,	Comedy, Romance	"Laugh Category Uminchu Prize Grand Prix" – 2011 (3rd) Okinawa International Movie Festival – March 18–27, 2011
The Intruder	Thanadol Nualsuth, Thammanoon Sakulboonthanom	Akara Amarttayakul, Kwankao Svetamaia, Apinya Sakuljaroensuk	Horror	
H2-Oh! (Narm Pee Nong Sayong Kwan) (Thai: น้ำ ผีนองสยองขวัญ)	Ong-art Cheamcharoenporn	Intira Jaroenpura, Kohtee Aramboy, Kom Chauncheun, Panyapat Thanomkul, Pinklao Nararak, Pattaraporn Sriyayang	Comedy horror	
Hello Stranger (Kuan meun ho) (Thai: กวนมึนโฮ)	Banjong Pisanthanakun	Chantavit Dhanasevi, Nuengthida Sophon	Romantic comedy	
Joly Rangers (Kongphan kruek kruen t. thaharn khuek khak) (Thai: กองพันครึกครื้น ท.ทหารคึกคัก)	Note Chern-Yim	Natee Aekwijit, Note Chern-Yim, Suranan Chumtaratorn, Kittipong Khamsat, Waraphat Phatsathit	Comedy	
Loser Lover (Sudkhet Salet Pet) (Thai สุดเขต สเลดเป็ด)	Reukchai Puangpetch, Rergchai Poungpetch	Arak Amornsupasiri, Kom Chuanchuen, Koeti Aramboy, Ramita Mahapreukpong	Comedy	
My Ex 2 : Haunted Lover (Thai: แฟนใหม่)	Piyapan Choopetch	Ratchawin Wongviriya, Atthama Chiwanitchaphan, Thongpoom Siripipat, Marion Affolter, Pete Thongchua	Horror	
My Valentine (Thai: แล้วรักก็หมุนรอบตัวเรา)	Pornchai Hongrattanaporn, Songsak Mongkolthong	Mintita Wattanakul, Suwikrom Amaranon, Onarnitch Pirachakajornpat, Thanawat Prasitsomporn, Wasu Sangsingkaew, Krit Sripoomseth	Comedy Romance	
Ong Bak 3	Tony Jaa, Panna Rittikrai	Tony Jaa, Dan Chupong, Kessarin Ektawatkul	Martial arts	
The Red Eagle	Wisit Sasanatieng	Ananda Everingham, Yarinda Bunnag, Pornwut Sarasin	Superhero film	
Secret Sunday	Saranyu Jiralaksanakul		Horror	
Sorry Saranghaeyo	Poj Arnon	Haru Yamaguchi, Ajoo, Saran Sirilak, Guy Ratchanont, Patrick Paiyer	Comedy	
Uncle Boonmee Who Can Recall His Past Lives	Apichatpong Weerasethakul			Won the Palme d'Or at the 2010 Cannes Film Festival
The Vanquisher	Manop Udomdej	Sopita Sribanchuen, Kessarin Ektawatkul, Pete Thongchua	Action	
Yamada: The Samurai of Ayothaya	Nopporn Watin	Seigi Ozeki, Sorapong Chatree, Winai Kraibutr	Action	
Yes or No	Sarasawadee Wongsompetch	Sucharat Manaying, Supanart Jitalleela	Romantic comedy drama	

=== 2011 ===
Title	Director	Actors	Genre	Notes
2011
30+ (Single On sale), 30+ Soht On Sale	Puttipong Pormsaka Na-Sakonnakorn	Laila Boonyasak, Arak Amornsupasiri, Sudarat Budtporm, Pijitra Siriwerapan	Romance Comedy	
At First Site (Bang Kon Care) (Thai: บางคนแคร์แคร์บางคน)	Kullachat Jitcajonwanich	Rattapong Kelly Tanaphat, Howard Wang, Wurithipa Woonsen Pukdeeprasong	Comedy	
Kon Khon	Sarunyu Wongkrachang			Thailand's submission for the Academy Award for Best Foreign Language Film
Ladda land (Thai: ลัดดาแลนด์)	Sophon Sakdaphisit	Saharat Sangkapreecha, Piyathida Woramusik, Sutatta Udomsilp, Athipich Chutiwatkajornchai, Deuntem Salitul, Sahajak Boonthanakit, Chayanisa Micheli, Theerut Weerawet, Sasapin Sirivanit, Prarames Noiarm, Jumrern Rattanatangtrakul, Sasiwan Lertwiriyaprapa, Pongsuk Herunyapreak, Tanabadin Yongseabcart, Somwang Namdoang	Horror	
Love Summer (Thai: รักตะลอนออนเดอะบีช)	Triluck Makmeongpad	Thana Aiemniyom, Thanwa Suriyajak, Jonathan Samson, Pimchanok Luevisadpaibul, Yui Tatsumi	Comedy	
The Billionaire	Songyos Sugmakanan	Pachara Chirathivat, Somboonsuk Niyomsiri	Briographical	
The Kick	Prachya Pinkaew			
SuckSeed	Chayanop Boonprakob	Jirayu Laongmanee, Pachara Chirathivat, Thawat Pornrattanaprasert, Nattasha Nauljam	Comedy	
Headshot	Pen-Ek Ratanaruang	Jayanama Nopachai		

=== 2012 ===
Title	Director	Actors	Genre	Notes
2012
3 A.M. 3D (Thai:ตีสาม 3D)	Issara Nadee, Kirati Nakintanon, Patchanon Thammajira	Apinya Sakuljaroensuk, Chakrit Yamnam, Ray MacDonald, Focus Jirakul, Shahkrit Yamnarm, Toni Rakkaen, Karnklao Duaysianklao, Peter Knight, Vasana Chalakorn, Vivid Bavornkiratikajorn, Nayapak Bhumipak, Thanawat Prasitsomporn, Prachakorn Piyasakulkaew, Kanyarin Nithinoparath	Horror	Film Studio: Five Star Production 3AM is a trilogy with: 1. 2012 3 A.M. 3D Part 1; 2. 2014 3 A.M. 3D Part 2; 3. 2018 3 A.M. 3D Part 3 Aftershock
9-9-81 (Thai: บอก-เล่า-9-ศพ)	Rapeepimol Chaiyasena	Patitta Attayatamavitaya, Supachai Girdsuwan, Setsit Limkasitdej, Thiti Vechabul	Horror	
ATM: Er Rak Error (Thai: เออรักเออเร่)	Mez Tharatorn	Chantavit Dhanasevi, Preechaya Pongthananikorn, Anna Chuancheun, Pongsatorn Jongwilak, Puttachat Pongsuchat, Thawat Pornrattanaprasert, Sananthachat Thanapatpisal, Chaleumpol Tikumpornteerawong, Yanee Tramoth	Romance Comedy	
Countdown (Thai: เคาท์ดาวน์)	Nattawut Poonpiriya	Pachara Chirathivat, Jarinporn Joonkiat, Pattarasaya Kreuasuwansri, David Asavanond, Prach Rakissarakul, Lawrence de Stefano	Horror Thriller	
Dark Flight (407 Dark Flight 3D) (Thai: 407 เที่ยวบินผี)	Issara Nadee	Marsha Vadhanapanich, Peter Knight, Paramej Noiam, Paramej Noiam, Anchalee Hassadeevichit, Thiti Vechabul, Namo Tongkumnerd, Sisangian Sihalath, Jonathan Samson, Kristen Evelyn Rossi	Horror	Film Studio: Five Star Production
DogGod & Full Water (Mah apiniharn lae khuad mahasamut) (Thai: หมาอภินิหารและขวดใส่มหาสมุทร)	Amorn Harinnitisuk			
First Kiss (Rak sud tai pai na) (Thai: รักสุดท้าย ป้ายหน้า)	Kirati Nakintanon	Takrit Hemannopjit, Kaneungnich Jaksamithanon, Tin Chokamolkit, Songsit Roongnophakunsri, Pichasini Tanwiboon	Romance	
Friends Never Die; My True Friend (Mueng Ku) (Thai: -มึงกู เพื่อนกันจนวันตาย)	Atsajun Sattakovit	Ranee Campen, Natcha Juntapan, Mario Maurer, Kamolned Ruengsri, Mo Monchanok Saengchaipiangpen	Action	
Heaven and Hell (Wong Jorn Pid) (Thai: วงจรปิด)	Yuthlert Sippapak, Tiwa Moeithaisong	Theeradanai Suwannahom, Patcharee Tubthong, Artit Wiboonpanitch	Horror	
Home	Chookiat Sakveerakul		Romantic drama	
I MISS U (Thai: รักฉันอย่าคิดถึงฉัน)	Monthon Arayangkoon	Jesdaporn Pholdee, Apinya Sakuljaroensuk, Natthaweeranuch Thongmee, Intira Jaroenpura	Horror romance	
Jan Dara: The Beginning (Jan Dara pathommabot) (Thai:จันดารา ปฐมบท)	M.L. Pundhevanop Dhewakul	Mario Maurer, Chaiyapol Julien Poupart, Sakrat Ruekthamrong, Bongkoj Khongmalai, Yayaying Rhatha Phongam, Shô Nishino, Savika Chaiyadej, Nat Tephadsadin Na Ayutthaya, Ratklao Amaradit, Chudapha Chantakett, Thaweesa Thana-nan, Pongpat Wachirabunjong, Nutt Devahastin, Phattaranan Ruamchi, Kesarin Chaichalermpol	Drama romance	Jan Dara is a trilogy with: 1. Jan Dara (2001); 2. Jan Dara: The Beginning (2012); 3. Jan Dara: The Finale (2013)
Love at First Flood (Rak aow yu) (Thai: รักเอาอยู่)	Tiwa Moeithaisong, Thanadol Nualsuth	Butsarin Yokpraipan	Romance	
My Name is Love (Khao riak phom wa kwam rak) (Thai: เค้าเรียกผมว่าความรัก)	Wasin Pokpong	Arak Amornsupasiri, Kom Chauncheun, Peerawat Herabat, Pongpitch Preechaborisuthikul, Padung Songsang	Romance	
Mekong Hotel	Apichatpong Weerasethakul		Drama	
P-047 (Tae peang phu deaw) (Thai: แต่เพียงผู้เดียว)	Kongdej Jaturanrasamee	Margot Chung, Weerasak Glunrawd, Nastnathakit Intarasut, Kaneungnich Jaksamithanon, Teepisit Mahaneeranon, Prinya Ngamwongwarn, Chintana Sapahusolsant, pichai Tragoolpadetkrai, Boonsong Waesongnern	Drama	
She: Their Love Story (She เรื่องรักระหว่างเธอ)	Sarunya Noithai (สรัญญา น้อยไทย)	Penpak Sirikul, Ann Siriwan Baker, Apassaporn Saengthong, Kitchya Kaesuwan	Romantic drama	Film studio: Angel & Bear Productions
Yes or No 2 (Rak mai rak ya kak loei) (Thai: รักไม่รักอย่ากั๊กเลย)	Sarasawadee Wongsompetch	Sucharat Manaying,Suppanad Jittaleela,Sarunthorn Klaiudom	Romantic comedy	

=== 2013 ===
Title	Director	Actors	Genre	Notes
2013
A Stranger in Paradise	Corrado Boccia	Stuart Townsend, Jan Yousagoon, Varintorn Yaroojjanont	Thriller	
Grean Fictions (Krian Fiction) (Thai: เกรียนฟิคชั่น)	Chookiat Sakveerakul	Pattadon Janngeon, Krissanapoom Pibulsonggram, Purim Rattanaruangwattana, Kittisak Patomburana, Laknara Piatha	Comedy drama	
Hashima Project (H project) (Thai: ฮาชิมะโปรเจกต์)	Piyapan Choopetch	Apinya Sakuljaroensuk, Pirat Nipitpaisalkul, Alexander Rendell, Sushar Manaying, Mek Mekwattana, Shô Nishino	Horror	
Jan Dara: The Finale (Jan Dara Pachimmabot) (Thai: จันดารา ปัจฉิมบท)	M.L. Pundhevanop Dhewakul	Mario Maurer, Chaiyapol Julien Poupart, Sakrat Ruekthamrong, Bongkoj Khongmalai, Yayaying Rhatha Phongam, Shô Nishino, Savika Chaiyadej, Nat Tephadsadin Na Ayutthaya, Ratklao Amaradit, Chudapha Chantakett, Thaweesa Thana-nan, Ruangsak Loychusak, Phongsiree Bunluewong, Wannarot Sonthichai	Drama romance	Jan Dara is a trilogy with: 1. Jan Dara (2001); 2. Jan Dara: The Beginning (2012); 3. Jan Dara: The Finale (2013)
Last Summer (Ruedoo ron nan chan tai) (Thai: -ฤดูร้อนนั้น ฉันตาย	Saranyoo Jiralak, Sitisiri Mongkolsiri	Jirayu La-ongmanee, Ekawat Niratvorapanya, Sutatta Udomsilp	Horror	
Long Weekend	Taweewat Wantha	Natpassara Adulyamethasiri, Acharanat Ariyaritwikol, Chinawut Indracusin, Sean Jindachot, Kitlapat Korasudraiwon, Butsarin Yokpraipan, Sheranut Yusananda	Horror	
Make Me Shudder (Mo 6/5 pak ma tha phi) (Thai: มอ 6 5 ปากหมาท้าผี)	Poj Arnon	Brian Richard Garton, Kunatip Pinpradub, Chutcha Rujinanon, Kittipat Samarntragulchai, Worachai Sirikongsuwan, Rittichai Tasarika, Withawat Thaokhamlue, Patharawarin Timkul, Puvadol Vechwongsa	Comedy Horror	Make Me Shudder is a trilogy with: 1. Make Me Shudder (2013); 2. Make Me Shudder 2: Shudder Me Mae Nak (2014); 3. Make Me Shudder 3 (2015)

=== 2014 ===
Title	Director	Actors	Genre	Notes
2014
3 A.M. 3D Part 2 (Thai: ตีสาม คืนสาม 3D)	Isara Nadeee, Putipong Saisikaew, Kirati Nakintanon	Sinjai Plengpanich, Supanart Jittaleela, Ray MacDonald, Thawat Pornrattanaprasert, Hataichat Eurkittiroj, Intach Leorakwong, Intach Leorakwong, Apapattra Meesang, Pongsatorn Sripinta, Patty Hokari, Pichasini Tanwiboon, Vorachai Nualsri, Suttasit Pottasak	Horror	Film Studio: Five Star Production 3AM is a trilogy with: 1. 2012 3 A.M. 3D Part 1; 2. 2014 3 A.M. 3D Part 2; 3. 2018 3 A.M. 3D Part 3 Aftershock
Call me bad girl (Kwam Lab Nang Man Rai) (Thai: ความลับนางมารร้าย)	Ong-art Cheamcharoenporn	Pechaya Wattanamontri, Teeradetch Metawarayut, Zuvapit Traipornworakit	Romance	
Dangerous Boys (Wai peng nak leng kha san) (Thai: วัยเป้งงนักเลงขาสั้น)	Poj Arnon	Brian Richard Garton, Kunatip Pinpradub, Anon Saisangcharn, Kittipat Samarntragulchai, Worachai Sirikongsuwan, Rittichai Tasarika, Withawat Thaokhamlue, Patharawarin Timkul, Puvadol Vechwongsa	Action	
Ghost Coins (Game pluk phi) (Thai: เกมปลุกผี)	Tiwa Moeithaisong	Hataichat Eurkittiroj, Chinnapat Kitichaivaranggoon, Rhatha Phongam, Timethai Plangsilp, Namo Tongkumnerd, Thanayong Wongtrakul	Horror	
I Fine Thank You Love You (Ai Fai.. Thank You Love You)	Mez Tharatorn	Sora Aoi, Puttachat Pongsuchat, Preechaya Pongthananikorn, Popetorn Soonthornyanakij, Sunny Suwanmethanont, Bonnie Zellerbach	Comedy	
Love Among Us (1448 Love Among Us) (Thai: รักเราของใคร)	Arunsak Ongla-or	Apinya Sakuljaroensuk, Isabella Lete, Pudit Kunchanasongkarm, Pattadon Jan-Ngern	Drama	
Make Me Shudder 2: Shudder Me Mae Nak (Mathayom pak ma tha Mae Nak) (Thai: มอ 6 5 ปากหมาท้าแม่นาค)	Poj Arnon	Brian Richard Garton, Kunatip Pinpradub, Pongpitch Preechaborisuthikul, Kittipat Samarntragulchai, Wanida Termthanaporn, Withawat Thaokhamlue, Puvadol Vechwongsa	Comedy Horror	Make Me Shudder is a trilogy with: 1. Make Me Shudder (2013); 2. Make Me Shudder 2: Shudder Me Mae Nak (2014); 3. Make Me Shudder 3 (2015)
O.T. Overtimer (O.T. phi) (Thai: O.T. ผี)	Isara Nadee	Ananda Everingham, Patty Hokari, Ray MacDonald, Akkarat Nimitchai, Nalintip Permpattarasakul, Atthaphan Phunsawat, Shahkrit Yamnarm	Comedy horror, Thriller	

=== 2015 ===
Title	Director	Actors	Genre	Notes
2015
May nai fai rang frer	Chayanop Boonprakob	Sutatta Udomsilp, Thiti Mahayotaruk, , Thanapob Leeratanakajorn	Comedy	
Back to the 90s / Alternative (2538) (2538 alter ma jib) (Thai: 2538 อัลเทอร์มาจีบ)	Yanyong Kuruaungkoul	Pimchanok Leuwisetpaiboon, Achita Pramoj Na Ayudhya, Dan Aaron Ramnarong	Romantic comedy	
Bong Srolanh Oun (Thai: บองสรันโอน)	Siwaporn Pongsuwan	Apittha Khlaiudom, Ray MacDonald, Thodsapol Siriwiwat, Tanwarin Sukkhapisit, Theeradanai Suwannahom	Horror	
Cat a Wabb (Cat Awol) ( Thai: แคทอ่ะแว้บ)	Pongsak Pongsuwan, Nareubadee Wetchakam	Pimchanok Leuwisetpaiboon, Arak Amornsupasiri, Choosak Iamsook, Johnny The Burmese Cat, Pongsak Pongsuwan	Comedy	
Cemetery of Splendo(u)r (Rak ti Khon Kaen)	Apichatpong Weerasethakul	Jenjira Pongpas, Banlop Lomnoi, Jarinpattra Rueangram, Petcharat Chaiburi, Petcharat Chaiburi, Sujittraporn Wongsrikeaw, Bhattaratorn Senkraigul, Sakda Kaewbuadee, Pongsadhorn Lertsukon, Sasipim Piwansenee, Apinya Unphanlam, Richard Abramson, Kammanit Sansuklerd, Boonyarak Bodlakorn, Wacharee Nagvichien	Fantasy Drama	
Karma	Kanittha Khaewyu	Pimpan Chalaikupp, Sorapong Chatree, Danai Jarujinda, Ploy Sornarin, Attaporn Teemakorn, Charlie Trairat,	Horror drama	
Ghost Ship (Mon Son Phee) (Thai: มอญซ่อนผี)	Achira Nokthet	Nutcha Jeka, Sean Jindachot, Timethai Plangsilp, Pongsatorn Sripinta, Theeradanai Suwannahom, Puvadol Vechwongsa	Comedy horror	Film Studio: Five Star Production
Heart attack, Freelance:Ham puay... Ham phak... Ham rak mor	Nawapol Thamrongrattanarit	Sunny Suwanmethanon, Davika Hoorne, Violette Wautier, Torpong Chantabubph,	Comedy	
Him and Her (367 wan Him and Her) (Thai: 367 วัน)	Thiwarat Phadungkarn	Ampha Phoosit, Kowit Wattanakul	Romance	
Lost in Seoul (Cha-lui: Lost in Seoul) (Thai: ฉลุย แตะขอบฟ้า)	Direk Wattaleela	Nachat Janthapan, Mek Mekwattana, Warapan Nguitrakul, Zuvapit Traipornworakit, Nichkhun	Drama	
Love Arumirai (Love a ru mi rai rak arai mai ru) (Thai: เลิฟอะรูมิไลค์ รักอะไรไม่รู้)	Jit Khamnoedrat, Kanakarn Saithong	Pitsanu Nimsakul, Sheranut Yusananda, Kom Chauncheun, Achita Sikamana	Comedy crime fantasy	
Love H2O (Thai: คนอกหัก)	Suttasit Dechintaranarak	Ananda Everingham, Toni Rakkaen, Nutprapas Tanatanamaharat, Navin Yavapolkul	Drama Romance	
Make Me Shudder 3 (Mo 6/5 pak ma tha phi 3) (Thai: มอ 6 5 ปากหมาท้าผี 3)	Poj Arnon	Grégory Matthias Garcia, Brian Richard Garton, Kunatip Pinpradub, Kittipat Samarntragulchai, Siraphop Manithikhun, Worachai Sirikongsuwan, Wiradit Srimalai, Rittichai Tasarika, Withawat Thaokhamlue, Puvadol Vechwongsa	Comedy Horror	Make Me Shudder is a trilogy with: 1. Make Me Shudder (2013); 2. Make Me Shudder 2: Shudder Me Mae Nak (2014); 3. Make Me Shudder 3 (2015)
May Who? (May nai fai rang frer) (Thai: เมย์ไหนไฟแรงเฟร่อ)	Chayanop Boonprakob	Sutatta Udomsilp, Thiti Mahayotaruk, Thanapob Leeratanakajorn, Narikun Ketprapakorn, Kanyawee Songmuang	Comedy Romance	
Oh My Ghost (Thai: หอแต๋วแตกแหกนะคะ; OMG khun phi chuay)	Puttipong Pormsaka Na-Sakonnakorn	Kohtee Aramboy, Sudarat Butrprom, Kom Chauncheun, Sirin Horwang, Sakuntala Thianphairot	Comedy	Sequels: Oh My Ghosts! 2 2009 Oh My Ghost! 3 2011

=== 2016 ===
Title	Director	Actors	Genre	Notes
2016
4G Joking Jazz (I like Jazz 4G), Luang Pee Jazz 4G	Poj Arnon	Padung Songsang (Jazz Chuan Chuen), Kunathip Pinpradub	Comedy	
Prad 888, 888 Fast Thai (Thai: ป๊าด 888 แรงทะลุนรก)	Poj Arnon	Padung Songsang, Kunatip Pinpradub	Comedy	
A Gift, (Pohn-Jak-Fah) (พรจากฟ้า, RTGS: Phon Chak Fa, meaning "blessings from the sky")	Jira MaligoolNithiwat TharathornChayanop BoonprakobGrienggrai Wachiratammapohn	Chantavit Dhanasevi, Nuengthida Sophon, Sunny Suwanmethanont, Nittha Jirayungyurn, Naphat Siangsomboon, Violette Wautier	Musical Romance Drama Comedy	Film studio: GDH 559
Bangkok 13, Muang Kon Tai (Thai: เมือง ฅน ตาย)	Dulyasit Niyomgul	Worarat Karnjanarat, Thodsapol Siriwiwat, Theeradanai Suwannahom	Horror	
By the Time It Gets Dark (Dao khanong) (Thai: ดาวคะนอง)	Anocha Suwichakornpong	Visra Vichit-Vadakan, Arak Amornsupasiri, Achtara Suwan, Intira Jaroenpura, Soraya Nakasuwan, Rassami Paoluengtong, Penpak Sirikul, Apinya Sakuljaroensuk, Waywiree Ittianunkul, Natdanai Wangsiripaisarn, Apiwong Sajee, Vigrom Suvarnnapradip, Chailuang Dithabumroong, Jawaree Thongdeelert, Danaya Chulphuthiphong	Drama	
Ghost is all around (11-12-13 Rak Kan Ja Tai) (Thai: รักกันจะตาย)	Sarawut Wichiensarn	Kreepolrerk Darvid, Sukollawat Kanarot, Nutthasit Kotimanuswanich, Ramita Mahapreukpong, Mek Mekwattana	Comedy horror	
Grace (Awasarn Lok Suay) (Thai: อวสานโลกสวย)	Ornusa Donsawai, Pun Homchuen	Apinya Sakuljaroensuk, Nutthasit Kotimanuswanich, Napasasi Surawan, Hataichat Eurkittiroj, Wasit Pongsopha	Thriller	4 nominations: Thailand National Film Association Award for Best Actress
Haunted School (Rong Rian Phee) (Thai: โรงเรียนผี)	Manasanan Pongsuwan	Kohtee Aramboy, Kom Chauncheun, Ingkarat Damrongsakkul, Arpa Pawilai, Pongsak Pongsuwan	Comedy horror	
Haunting in Japan (Thai: บุปผาอาริกาโตะ; Buppah Arigato)	Yuthlert Sippapak	Aphichan Chaleumchainuwong, Anyarit Pitakkul, Yok Teeranitayatarn, Supassra Thanachat, Chaleumpol Tikumpornteerawong, Charlie Trairat, Thana Vichayasuranan	Comedy, Horror	
Koey Ther Phee Ma Weaw (Thai: โกยเถอะผีมาแว้วว)			Comedy	
Love Beat (Luk Thung Signature) (Thai: ลูกทุ่งซิกเนเจอร์)	Prachya Pinkaew	Benjaphol Choey-arun, Thanon Jumroen, Nawapol Lumpoon, Rungrat Mengpanit, Sombat Metanee, Sumeth Ong-ard, Ploy Sornarin, Krissada Sukosol Clapp, Ben Chalatit Tantiwut, Kanuengpim Thanaphitchakorn, Siraphan Wattanajinda, Pisamai Wilaisak, Shahkrit Yamnam	Music film	
Midnight University (Mahalai Tiang Kuen) (Thai: มหาลัยเที่ยงคืน)	Piyabutr Athisuk, Kritsada Kaniwichaphon	Rasri Balenciaga, Maythinee Booranasiri, Metanee Buranasiri, Bawriboon Chanreuang, Kreepolrerk Darvid, Toni Rakkaen	Comedy Horror	
Motel Mist (Thai: โรงแรมต่างดาว)	Prabda Yoon	Prapamonton Eiamchan, Vasuphon Kriangprapakit, Wissanu Likitsathaporn, Surapol Poonpiriya, Katareeya Theapchatri	Sci-Fi, Thriller	
One Day (Thai: แฟนเดย์)	Banjong Pisanthanakun	Chantavit Dhanasevi, Nittha Jirayungyurn, Theerapat Sajakul, Prim Bulakul, Kris Srepoomseth, Somyos Matures, Sutthatip Wutichaipradit, Rermthon Kemapech, Kaz Sawamura, Suttichoke Janya-Angkul, Valad Saneeh, Itthisak Treesagna, Pakorn Siriangkul, Rinrapat Ariyakornwijit, Sawanee Utoomma	Romance Drama	Film studio: GDH 559
Take me Home (Thai: สุขสันต์วันกลับบ้าน)	Kongkiat Khomsiri	Mario Maurer, Wannarote Sonthichai, Noppachai Jayanama	Horror drama	

=== 2017 ===
Title	Director	Actors	Genre	Notes
2017
Arbat (Thai: อาปัติ)	Kanittha Kwanyu			Studio: Sahamongkolfilm International Co., Ltd
Bad Genius (Thai: ฉลาดเกมส์โกง)	Nattawut Poonpiriya	Chutimon Chuengcharoensukying, Chanon Santinatornkul, Teeradon Supapunpinyo, Eisaya Hosuwan	Heist Thriller	Film studio: GDH 559; 16th New York Asian Film Festival Jury Award, 20th Fantasia International Film Festival Séquences Award – Best Film, 13th Fantastic Fest Best Picture for Thriller Features
Die Tomorrow	Nawapol Thamrongrattanarit	Sunny Suwanmethanont, Patcha Poonpiriya, Sirat Intarachote	Drama	
Malila: The Farewell Flower (Thai: มะลิลา)	Anucha Boonyawatana	Sukollawat Kanarot, Anuchit Sapanpong, Sumret Muengput, Akekarad Khalong, Prakasit Horwannapakorn, Punthip Teekul, Bodin Moomeensri, Veeravat Jamrensan	Drama	
Mr.Hurt (Thai: มือ วาง อันดับ เจ็บ)	Ittisak Eusunthornwattana	Sunny Suwanmethanont, Mashannoad Suvalmas, Marie Broenner, Pongsatorn Jongwilak, Markus Waldow	Romance Comedy	
Net I Die (Thai: เน็ต ไอ ดาย)	Weeratham Preedee	Chicha Amatayakul, Kachai Pich, Fahkuelon Ratsameekhae, Klai-Udom Sarantorn	Horror Thriller	
Oversize Cops (Thai: โอเวอร์ไซส์..ทลายพุง)	Phuwanit Pholdee, Chanon Yingyong	Sarun Cinsuvapala, Nutjaree Horvejkul, Somyos Matures, Supavitch Nepremwattana, Pramote Pathan, Suphachai Subprasert	Action Comedy	
Pop Aye	Kristen Tan	Thaneth Warakulnukroh, Penpak Sirikul, Sasapin Siriwanji	Drama	won a Special Jury Prize in the World Cinema Dramatic Competition section of the 2017 Sundance Film Festival.
Siam Square	Pairach Khumwan	Eisaya Hosuwan, Thanabordee Jaiyen, Nutthasit Kotimanuswanich	Horror	
Thailand Only	Phanlop Sincharoen	Choosak Iamsook, Akom Preedakul, Padung Songsang	Comedy	Film studio: Phranakorn Film Co., Ltd.
The Moment, Ruk Kong Rao	Panjapong Kongkanoy, Laddawan Rattanadilokchai	Manpreet Bachu, Pachara Chirathivat, Jarinporn Joonkiat	Drama Romance	
The Promise, Puen Tee Raluek	Sophon Sakdapisit	Namthip Jongrachatawiboon, Apichaya Thongkam	Horror drama	Film studio: GDH 559
Thong Dee Fun Khao	Bin Bunluerit	Buakaw Banchamek, Phutharit Prombandal	Action	Film Studio: Sahamongkol Film International

=== 2018 ===
Title	Director	Actors	Genre	Notes
2018
2,215	Nottapon Boonprakob	Artiwara Kongmalai, Samitada Sungkapo	Documentary	Production studio: GDH 559
3 A.M. 3D Part 3 Afterschock (Thai: ตี 3 อาฟเตอร์ช็อก)	Phatthaphan Phanangsiri, Statute Sakulboon Thanom, Thanadon Nualtsut, Nitiwat Cholvanichsiri	Pokphassornkorn, Sherin Nattachari, Namchachiranat, Punch Worakarn	Horror	Film Studio: Five Star Production 3AM is a trilogy with: 1. 2012 3 A.M. 3D Part 1; 2. 2014 3 A.M. 3D Part 2; 3. 2018 3 A.M. 3D Part 3 Aftershock
7 Days (thai: 7 Days เรารักกัน จันทร์-อาทิตย์)	Panjapong Kongkanoy	Lawrence de Stefano, Ananda Everingham, Nittha Jirayungyurn	Drama Romance	
App War (Thai: แอปชนแอป)	Yanyong Kuruaungkoul	Nat Kitcharit, Varitsara Yu, Sirat Intarachote, Apiwich Reardon, Ticha Wongthipkanont, Thanapop Yoovijit, Patchanan Jiajirachote	Comedy Romance Drama	Film studio: TMoment (TAI Entertainment)
Bikeman (Bike Mankaraktakin) (Thai: ไบค์แมน ศักรินทร์ตูดหมึก)	Prueksa Amaruji	Pachara Chirathivat, Sananthachat Thanapatpisal; Jennifer Kim, Kom Chauncheun, Pramote Pathan, Robert Saikwan	Comedy	
Brother of the Year (Thai: น้องพี่ที่รัก)	Witthaya Thongyuyong (Vithaya Thongyuyong)	Sunny Suwanmethanont, Urassaya Sperbund, Nichkhun, Anchuleeon Buagaew, Chanchalerm Manasaporn	Romance comedy	Film studio: GDH 559
Ghost Wife	Mate Yimsomboon	Supawadee Kitisopakul, Chitipat Wattanasiripong, Chitipat Wattanasiripong, Kamolnapatch Thanwong, Yotin Maphobpan, Yotin Maphobpan	Horror	
BNK48 : Girls Don' Cry (Thai: บีเอ็นเคโฟร์ตีเอต เกิร์ลดอนต์คราย)	Nawapol Thamrongrattanarit	Cherprang Areekul, Nayika Srinian, Rina Izuta Napaphat Worraphuttanon, Kunjiranut Intarasin, Jennis Oprasert, Suchaya Saenkhot Natruja Chutiwansopon, Warattaya Deesomlert, Korapat Nilprapa, Vathusiri Phuwapunyasiri, Panisa Srilaloeng Miori Ohkubo, Pimrapat Phadungwatanachok, Praewa Suthamphong	Documentary	More info of Thai music-group: BNK48
Homestay (Thai: โฮมสเตย์)	Parkpoom Wongpoom	Teeradon Supapunpinyo, Cherprang Areekul	Thriller, Fantasy	Film studio: GDH 559
Love Rain, (Thai: มากับฝน)	Pirun Anusuriya	Sammy Cowell, Boom Kitkong, Rikit Sittiphun, Kapol Thongplub, Primsada Weawthaisong	Romance, Horror	
Lord Bunlue (Khun-Bunlue) (Thai: ขุนบันลือ)	Petchtai Wongkamlao	Ekkachai Srivichai, Endoo Wongkamlao, Jear Pacific, Jessica Sompong, Latkamon Pinrojkirati, Nong Chernyim, Orrachorn Chernyim, Paytaai Wongkamlao, Petchtai Wongkamlao, Robert Saikwan, Saisin Wongkamlao, Sakkarach Sriwangpol, Sunaree Ratchasima, Tana Chatborirak	Comedy	
Luang Pee Jazz 5G (5G Joking Jazz)	Poj Arnon	Padung Songsang (Jazz Chuan Chuen),	Comedy	
Manta Ray	Phuttiphong Aroonpheng	Wanlop Rungkamjad, Aphisit Hama, Rasmee Wayrana	Drama	
Nakee 2 (Thai: นาคี 2)	Pongpat Wachirabunjong	Nadech Kugimiya, Urassaya Sperbund, Phupoom Pongpanu	Fantasy, Romance	
Reside (Singsu) (Thai: สิงสู่)	Wisit Sasanatieng	Ananda Everingham, Peerapol Kijreunpiromsuk, Teerawat Mulvilai, Jarunun Phantachat, Ploy Sornarin, Natthaweeranuch Thongmee, Tarika Tidatid	Horror	
Ten Years Thailand	Aditya Assarat, Wisit Sasanatieng		Drama	
The Pool	Ping Lumpraploeng	Theeradej Wongpuapan, Ratnamon Ratchiratham	Action Thriller	

=== 2019 ===
Title	Director	Actors	Genre	Notes
2019
Bikeman 2 (Thai: ไบค์แมน 2)	Prueksa Amaruji	Kom Chauncheun, Pachara Chirathivat, Somchai Kemglad, Jennifer Kim, Pramote Pathan, Sananthachat Thanapatpisal	Comedy	Film studio: Raruek Production
Boxing Sangkran (Thai: สงกรานต์ แสบสะท้านโลกันต์)	Poj Arnon	Robert Saikwan, Kunatip Pinpradab, Sawika Chaiyadech, Yorch Yongsin Wongpanitnont, Akom Preedakul, Nui Chernyim, Ball Chernyim	Comedy	
Dew (Thai: ดิว ไปด้วยกันนะ)	Chookiat Sakveerakul	Polnat Boonma, Yarinda Boonnak, Yarinda Bunnag, Apasiri Chantrasmi, Pawat Chittsawangdee, Sadanont Durongkaweroj, Sukollawat Kanarot, Pantach Kankham, Darisa Karnpob, Jessada Kowiboonchai, Nattapong Kulsathid, Maytichai Nangwong, Chanakarn Niruttipaworn, Patchamon Park, Narainrid Sa Aadluan	Drama Romance	Film studio: CJ Major Entertainment
Friend Zone (Thai: ระวัง..สิ้นสุดทางเพื่อน)	Chayanop Boonprakob	Sukapat Lohatcharin, Benjamin Joseph Warne, Natthasit Kotsanusvanich, Pimchanok Lue Wiset Phaibun, Na Phat Nuea Somboon	Romance comedy	Film studio: GDH 559
Happy Old Year (Thai: ฮาวทูทิ้ง..ทิ้งอย่างไรไม่ให้เหลือเธอ)	Nawapol Thamrongrattanarit	Chutimon Chuengcharoensukying, Sunny Suwanmethanont, Sarika Sathsilpsupa, Apasiri Nitibhon, Thirawat Ngosawang, Padcha Kitchaicharoen	Drama Romance	Film studio: GDH 559
Inhuman Kiss (Thai: แสงกระสือ)	Sitisiri Mongkolsiri	Phantira Pipityakorn, Sapol Assawamunkong, Surasak Wongthai, Sahatchai 'Stop' Chumrum, Sahajak Boonthanakit, Makorn Supinacharoen, Sasithorn Panichnok, Darina Boonchu, Namngen Boonnark, Phakwan Chaowalit, Pankorn Chantasorn, Ittipat Lekuthaiwan, Punnarat Lasutthi, Makhasiri Thepsittha	Drama Horror Romance	
Love Battle (Thai: รัก 2 ปี ยินดีคืนเงิน)	Wirat Hengkongdee	Prama Imanotai, Thanawetch Siriwattanakul, Esther Supreeleela	Comedy Romance	
Love and Run (Thai: มิสเตอร์ดื้อ กันท่าเหรียญทอง)	Chainarong Tampong	Rassameekae Fahgeulon, Gornpop Janjaroen, Palapol Polkongseng, Chanon Santinatornkul, Pongtiwat Tangwancharoen, Supassra Thanachat	Comedy Romance	Film studio: Raruek Production
Morlum Mania (Thai: หมอลำมาเนีย)	Nuntawut Poophasuk	Tassanai Sumbutteera,	Comedy	Film studio: Sahamongkol Film International
Pee Nak (Thai: พี่นาค)	Phontharis Chotkijsadarsopon	Chinawut Indracusin Chutima Naina, Wachara Pan-Iom, Paisarnkulwong Vachiravit, Jannine Parawie Weigel	Comedy Horror	Film Studio: Five Star Production
Tee Shot: Ariya Jutanugarn (Thai:โปรเม อัจฉริยะ|ต้?ง|สร้าง)	Tanawat Aiemjinda	Krissiri Sukhsvasti, Gigi Velicitat	Biography	Film studio: Transformation Films
The Spirit of Ramayana (Busaba) (Thai:บุษบา)	Chaiwat Sitlasai	Anusorn Maneeted Autthaporn Green Siriwattanakul	Horror	
Tootsies & The Fake (Thai: ตุ๊ดซี่ส์ แอนด์ เดอะเฟค)	Piyachart Thong-Uam	Araya A. Hargate, ritsanapoom Pibulsonggram, Hattaya Wongkrajang	Comedy	Film studio: GDH 559

== 2020s ==
=== 2020 ===
Title	Director	Actors	Genre	Notes
2020
Classic Again ( Thai: จดหมายสายฝนร่มวิเศษ)	Thatchaphong Suphasri	Thitipoom Techaapaikhun, Ranchrawee Uakoolwarawat, Gee Sutthirak Subvijitra, Tong Samitpong Sakulpongchai, Meiko Chonnikan Netjui, Amm Siraprapa Sookdamrong, Thitinan Khlangphet	Romance Drama	CJ Major Entertainment
Low Season (Thai: สุขสันต์วันโสด)	Nareubadee Wetchakam	Mario Maurer, Ploypailin Thangprapaporn, Kidakarn Chatkaewmanee, Theeradanai Suwannahom, Sriphan Chunechomboon, Nachat Janthapan, Morakot Liu, Nakhorn Silachai Sakonrat Woraurai	Comedy Horror Romance	Film studio: Sahamongkolfilm International Company
Pee Nak 2 (Thai: พี่นาค 2)	Phontharis Chotkijsadarsopon	Phiravich Attachitsataporn, Timethai Plangsilp, Paisarnkulwong Vachiravit	Comedy Horror	Film Studio: Five Star Production
The Maid (Thai: ตัวอย่างภาพยนตร์อย่างเป็นทางการ)	Lee Thongkham	Teerapat Sajjakul, Ploy Sornarin, Chi Wah Wong, Savika Chaiyadej, Ratchanok Suwannaket, Kannaporn Puangtong, Venus Saksiri, Natanee Sitthisaman, Ounruan Rachote, Alina Homsangpradit, Keetapat Pongrue, Sorabodee Changsiri	Horror Thriller	
Thibaan × BNK48 (Thai: ไทบ้าน x BNK48 จากใจผู้สาวคนนี้)	Surasak Pongsorn	Natruja Chutiwansopon, Warattaya Deesomlert, Jiradapa Intajak, Nuttawut Sanyabut, Kanteera Wadcharathadsanakul, Akkharadet Yodjumpa	Music Romance Comedy	More info of Thai music-group: BNK48
Who (Thai: Who ปิดป่าหลอน)	Kornphat Thangsri	Charlie Trairat, Worachai Sirikongsuwan	Horror Thriller	
Mother Gamer (Thai: Mother Gamer เกมเมอร์ เกมแม่)	Yanyong Kuruangkura	Piyada Akaraseni, Lapat Ngamchaweng, Tonhon Tantivejakul, Weeraya Zhang	Romance Comedy	Film studio: Sahamongkol Film International
The Con-Heartist (Thai: อ้าย..คนหล่อลวง)	Mez Tharatorn	Nadech Kugimiya, Pimchanok Luevisadpaibul, Thiti Mahayotaruk, Kathaleeya McIntosh, Pongsatorn Jongwilas	Romance Comedy	Film studio: GDH 559, Invited at 20th New York Asian Film Festival in Crowd Pleasers section.

=== 2021 ===
Title	Director	Actors	Genre	Notes
2021
One for the Road	Nattawut Poonpiriya	Chutimon Chuengcharoensukyin, Thanapob Leeratanakachorn, Natara Nopparatayapon, Violette Wautier	Drama	2021 Sundance Film Festival Special Jury Award for Creative Vision
Ghost Lab (Thai: GHOST LAB ฉีกกฎทดลองผี)	Paween Purijitpanya	Thanapob Leeratanakachorn, Paris Intarakomalyasut, Nuttanicha Dungwattanawanich	Thriller	GDH 559; Netflix original film
Deep (Thai: โปรเจกต์ลับ หลับ เป็น ตาย)	Sita Likitvanichkul, Jetarin Ratanaserikiat, Apirak Samudkidpisan, Thanabodee Uawithya, Adirek Wattaleela	Panisara Rikulsurakan, Kay Lertsittichai, Supanaree Sutavijitvong, Krit Jeerapattananuwong	Thriller	Netflix original film
The Medium (Thai: ร่างทรง)	Banjong Pisanthanakun	Narilya Gulmongkolpech, Sawanee Utoomma, Sirani Yankittikan, Yasaka Chaisorn	Horror	Co-production of South Korea's Showbox and Thailand's GDH 559; Best Film Award at 25th Bucheon International Fantastic Film Festival

=== 2022 ===
Title	Director	Actors	Genre	Notes
2022
The Antique Shop (Thai:ร้านของเก่า)	Suphakorn Riansuwan	Rio Dewanto, Damien Teo, Pijika Jittaputta, Pakchanok Wo-Onsri, Aloysius Pang, Bae Jin-young, Phiravich Attachitsataporn, New Chayapak Tunprayoon, Setthapong Eosuk	Horror	
Creepy Crawly (Thai: น่าขนลุกคลาน)	Chalit Krileadmongkon, Pakphum Wongjinda	Chanya McClory, Mike Angelo, Benjamin Joseph Varney, Kulteera Yordchang, David Asavanond, Paramej Noiam, Aticha Pongsilpipat, Wanpiya Omsinnopphakul, Sita Chutiphaworakan	Action, Fantasy, Horror	Alternate title: The One Hundred
Daeng (Thai: แดง พระโขนง)	Watcharapong Pattama	Melix Efe Aygun, Mum Jokmok, Machida Sutthikulphanich, Phuwarak Khamsing, Mboke Medad Epie, Surachai Borsuwan, Tanapatch Chantasorn, Chookiat Iamsook, Suthep Sisai	Comedy, Horror	
Fast and Feel Love (เร็วโหด..เหมือนโกรธเธอ)	Nawapol Thamrongrattanarit	Urassaya Sperbund, Nat Kitcharit	Action, Comedy	
The Lost Lotteries (Thai:ปฏิบัติการกู้หวย)	Prueksa Amaruji	Wongravee Nateetorn, Phantira Pipityakorn, Padung Songsang, Napapa Tantrakul, Somjit Jongjohor, Thanaporn Wagprayoon, Torpong Kul-On, Somyos Matures, Sutthirak Subvijitra,	Crime, Comedy	

=== 2023 ===
Title	Director	Actors	Genre	Notes
2023
Long Live Love!	Piyakarn Butprasert	Sunny Suwanmethanont, Araya A. Hargate, Nopachai Chaiyanam, Niti Chaichitathorn, Sadanont Durongkhaweroj, Rebecca Patricia Armstrong, Pannawit Phattanasiri	Romance	
Not Friends	Atta Hemwadee	Thitiya Jirapornsilp, Pisitphon Ekphongpisit, Anthony Buizeret, Tanakorn Tiyanont and Natticha Chantaravareelekha	Coming-of-age, Comedy-drama	
When a Snail Falls in Love	Songsak Mongkolthong	Thassapak Hsu, Zuvapit Traipornworakit, Nat Thewphaingam, Klaokaew Sinteppadon, Nitipong Pollachan, Sirinart Sugandharat	Crime, Detective, Thriller, Romance	Series (20 parts), There exists also a Chinese adaptation (2016) with the same title "When a Snail Falls in Love" of the underlying novel

=== 2024 ===
Title	Director	Actors	Genre	Notes
How to Make Millions Before Grandma Dies	Pat Boonnitipat	Putthipong Assaratanakul, Usha Seamkhum	Comedy-drama	Produced by Jor Kwang Films
Love You to Debt	Waasuthep Ketpetch	Vachirawit Chivaaree, Urassaya Sperbund	Action, Romance	(Alternate title: The Interest) Produced by Parbdee Taweesuk Co. Ltd
The Paradise of Thorns	Naruebet Kuno	Jeff Satur, Engfa Waraha	Drama, Romance, Thriller	Produced by GDH 559, Jor Kwang Film, Jai Studios

=== 2025 ===
Title	Director	Actors	Genre	Notes
Flat Girls	Jirassaya Wongsutin	Fatima Dechawaleekul, Kirana Pipityakorn, Pakorn Chatborirak	Coming-of-age, romance, drama	Produced by GDH 559 and Jor Kwang Films
The Red Envelope	Chayanop Boonprakob	Putthipong Assaratanakul, Krit Amnuaydechkorn, Arachaporn Pokinpakorn, Piyamas Monyakul, Jaturong Phonboon, Rusameekae Fagerlund, Ballchon Tanawat Cheawaram	Comedy, Mystery, Supernatural	Produced by Billkin Entertainment, GDH 559, PP Krit Entertainment
A Useful Ghost	Ratchapoom Boonbunchachoke	Davika Hoorne, Witsarut Himmarat, Apasiri Nitibhon, Wanlop Rungkumjad, Wisarut Homhuan	Black comedy, fantasy	Produced by 185 Films, Haut Les Mains, Momo Films, Mayana Films, N8, Cinema22

=== 2026 ===
Title	Director	Actors	Genre	Notes
Human Resource	Nawapol Thamrongrattanarit	Prapamonton Eiamchan, Paopetch Charoensook, Pimmada Chaisakaoen, Chanakan Rattana-Udom	Drama	Produced by Happy Ending Film, Jai Studios, Bangkok CityCity Gallery

== See also ==
- Lists of films
- List of films that use Thailand as a location
- List of Thailand's submissions for Academy Award for Best Foreign Language Film
