= Luang Ta =

1980 film

- Directed by: Permphol Cheyaroon
- Written by: Visuth Kemachiwa; Yue Mai Prae
- Starring: Chatupol Bhu-apirom
- Cinematography: Permphol Cheyaroon
- Production company: Five Star Production
- Distributed by: Five Star Production
- Release date: 1980
- Running time: 123 minutes
- Country: Thailand
- Language: Thai

Luang Ta is a 1980 Thai film directed by Permphol Cheyaroon. It was entered into the 31st Berlin International Film Festival.

== Cast ==
- Chatupol Bhu-apirom
- Lor Tok
- Supansa Neuang-bhirom
