= Behind the Painting =

Thai romantic novel

Khang Lang Phap (Thai: ข้างหลังภาพ), translated into English as Behind the Painting, is a Thai romantic novel by Kulap Saipradit (writing under the pen name Siburapha), published in 1937. It tells the story of Nopphon, a Thai student studying in Japan, who meets and develops a relationship with the aristocratic lady Mom Rajawongse Kirati, the newly married wife of a family acquaintance. Nopphon and Kirati develop romantic feelings which they are unable to acknowledge, leading to tensions as the characters face the conflict between their feelings and familial duties.

The work has come to be regarded as one of the foremost classic novels of the Thai literary canon. It has been reprinted almost forty times, is commonly listed as required reading for secondary school students, and has been adapted into two films (by Piak Poster in 1985 and Cherd Songsri in 2001) and three stage musicals.

== See also ==
- Thai literature
