= Romance in Mekong River =

- Starring: Yuen Siu-Kit (元少傑), Cheung Hai-Keung (張克強), Woo Siu-Kwan (胡少君)
- Production company: Siam United Film Studio
- Release date: 10 October 1933 (Bangkok)
- Running time: 120 minutes
- Country: Thailand
- Language: Cantonese

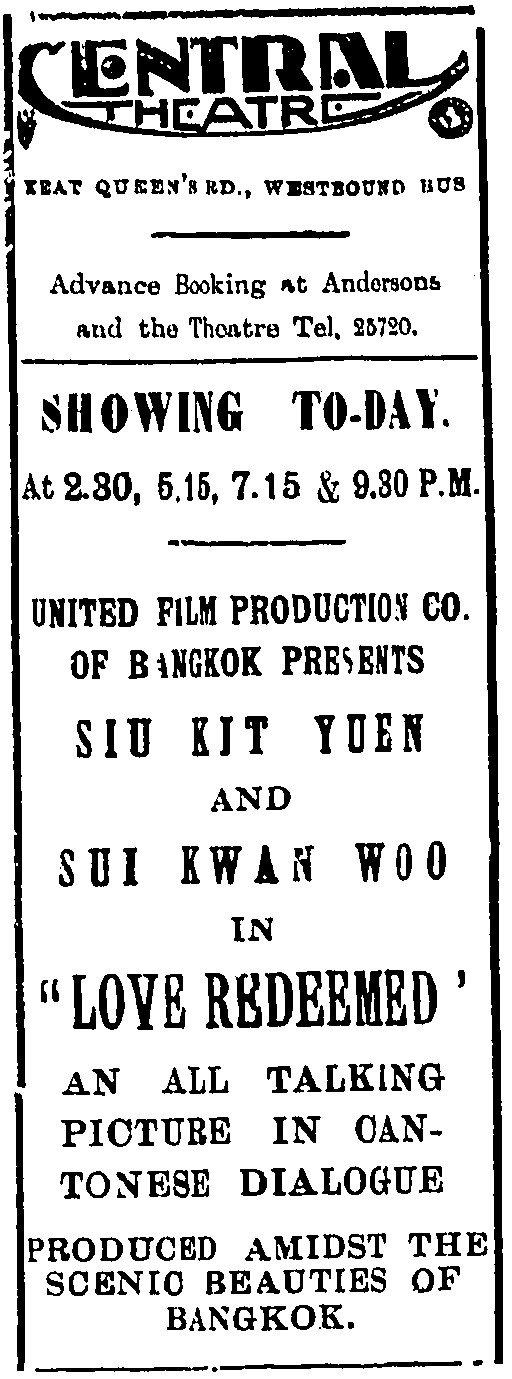
Advertisement of Siam Cantonese film Love Redeemed (湄江情浪) from Hong Kong Newspaper Hong Kong Daily Press on 18 December 1933 (Monday).

Romance in Mekong River (also known as "Honor Redeemed" or "Love Redeemed" in Hong Kong; Chinese: 湄江情浪) is a 1933, 2 hours romance musical film made by a group of Chinese overseas in Bangkok formed Siam United Film Studio, Thailand, directed by a USA Hollywood director with Western Electric Company's Movietone sound system in Cantonese dialect. The film premiered in Thailand cinemas on 10 October 1933, in Hong Kong cinemas on 17 December 1933, and in Singapore cinemas on 8 December 1934.

== Plot ==
A Chinese youth named Cheung Hai Keung (Yuen Siu Kit 元少傑) marries a lustful woman named Ng Chu Lau (Lee Lai 李麗). When they get divorced, she and the man she had an affair with, Lau Kwai Sung, slander Cheung Hai Keung as a communist, forcing him to use the pseudonym Lee Cheung Seng (李章生) and escape to Bangkok. When he arrives in Bangkok, he was hurt by collapsing rice bags near Tai Fung Rice Mill (大豐碾米廠). As a result, he meets the mill's boss Chan, gets a job there, and falls in love with Chan's daughter Chan Sik Fa (Wu Siu Kwan 胡少君).

When the Chinese Communist Party starts the civil war, Lau Kwai Sung comes to Bangkok too, but Cheung Hai Keung (not knowing he's evil) lets him work together with him at Tai Fung Rice Mill, providing him a chance to cheat Cheung again.

When Ng Chu Lau escapes to Bangkok too, everyone learns the fact of their affair. Cheung Hai Keung angrily shoots her, and Lau Kwai Sung eats a poison pill to commit suicide. Cheung Hai Keung gets married again, this time to Chan Sik Fa.

== Cast ==
- Yuen Siu-Kit (元少傑) – Cheung Hai-Keung (張克強), an honest Chinese youth;
- Woo Siu-Kwan (胡少君) – Chan Sik-Fa (陳惜花), the daughter of Tai Fung Rice Mill's boss;
- Lee Lai-Lin (李麗蓮) – Ng Chu Lau (吳翠柳), a lustful woman.
- Undefined – Lau Kwai-Sung (劉貴崇), an evil playboy.
- Lily Wu (伍莉莉);
- Lam Wai Fong (林蕙芳);
- Purple Jasmine (紫素馨);
- White Coral (白珊瑚).

== Film premieres ==
1. Thailand: 10 October 1933
2. Hong Kong: 16 December 1933, (Saturday) to 19 December 1933 (Tuesday), three days, at Central Theatre (中央戲院);
3. Singapore: 6 December 1934 (Thursday) to unknown, at China Theatre (中國有聲戲院) and Shanghai Theatre (上海大劇院);
4. Penang: 14 December 1934 (Friday) to 17 December 1934 (Monday), four days, at Royal Theatre (露野有聲戲院).
Film premiere in Hong Kong

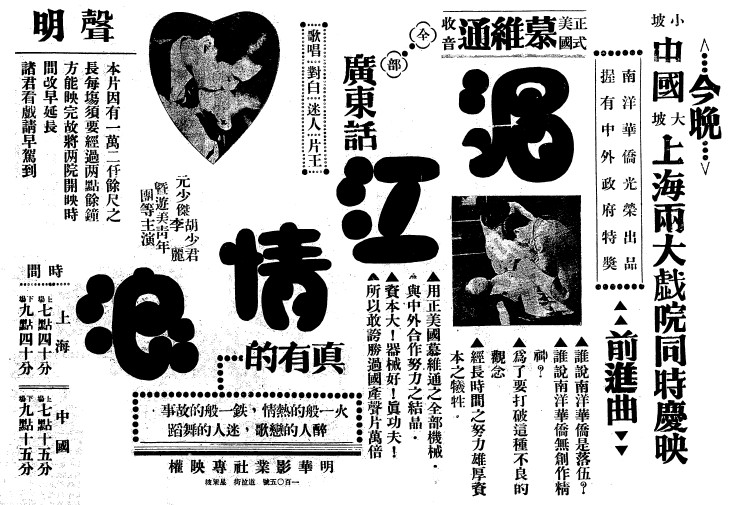
Film premiere in Singapore.

== Film theme hits ==
The film features three Cantonese film theme hits:

1. "Who Can Amuse Me?" (誰能遣此);
2. "Damsel Yearn for Love" (未免有情);
3. "Wolves from East Sea" (東海狼).
