= Siyama =

- Thai theatrical poster
- Directed by: Preecha Songsakul
- Produced by: Jirun Ratthanaviriyachai
- Starring: Than Thanakorn; Thitima Maliwan; Nattanun Jantarawetch
- Cinematography: Krisorn Buramasing
- Edited by: Thawat Sermsuwittayawong
- Distributed by: Mono Film
- Release date: 31 January 2008
- Running time: 107 minutes
- Country: Thailand
- Language: Thai

Siyama or Siyama: Village of Warriors (Thai: สียามา) is a 2008 Thai action-fantasy film directed by Preecha Songsakul.

== Plot ==
Siyama is the story of three Thai youths who are transported back in time to an ancient village in the last period of Ayutthaya kingdom. They find themselves in the midst of a vicious war with Burma before Ayutthaya is burned down (in April 1767).

== Cast ==
- Than Thanakorn as Prai
- Thitima Maliwan as Ana
- Nattanun Jantarawetch as Gib
- Bawriboon Chanreuang as Boat
- Sompob Benjathikul as Khruu Jom
- Viriya Juramakorn as Lung-Tup
- Montri Ketkaew as Luang Putone
- Hassapon Kongsib as Yuntra
