= Waraphat Phatsathit =

Thai actor and model

- วราภัทร์ เพชรสถิตย์
- Born: 8 February 1995 (age 31); Thailand
- Other name: Ice
- Education: Ramkhamhaeng University
- Occupation: Actor
- Years active: 2008–present
- Height: 5 ft 9 in (1.75 m)

Waraphat Phatsathit (Thai: วราภัทร์ เพชรสถิตย์, also spelt Warapat Petchsatit; born 8 February 1995), nicknamed Ice (Thai: ไอซ์), is a Thai actor. He is best known for his roles in the films Hor taew tak 4 (2012) and Jolly Rangers (2010).

== Biography ==
Waraphat was born on 8 February 1995 in Thailand. He graduated from Ramkhamhaeng University and Dhurakij Pundit University. He made his acting debut with a main role in Thai comedy horror film Oh My Ghosts! (Taew Tak 2) in 2019. The same year he then starred in the film Sassy Player.

In 2010, he starred in the film Jolly Rangers (กองพันครึกครื้น ท.ทหารคึกคัก) where he played the leading role with Chermawee Suwanpanuchoke. In 2011, he played supporting roles in the film Luer Lae, is about Thai folk music, released on 15 September 2011. In 2012, he gain increased attention and popularity in the comedy horror film Hor Taew Tak 4.

== Filmography ==
=== Film ===
Year	Film	Role	Notes
2009	Sassy Player	Ice	
2009	Oh My Ghosts!	Phukan	
2010	Jolly Rangers	Jiworn	Main Cast
2011	Luer Lae	Reggae	
2012	Hor Taew Tak 4	Gun	Main Cast

=== Television series ===
Year	Title	Role	Notes
2011	Wanalee	Rithi Rong or Rit	
2015	Waen Thonglueang	Police Lieutenant Nithat	
2015	Like Mat Sang	Bunlong	
2015	Luang Phi Digital		Guest cast
2015	Mong Kut Ritsaya	Danai	
