= Pairoj Jaisingha =

Thai actor (1943–2021)

- ไพโรจน์ ใจสิงห์
- Born: 15 September 1943; Uttaradit Province, Thailand
- Died: 22 February 2021 (aged 77); Bangkok, Thailand
- Occupation: Actor

Pairoj Jaisingha (Thai: ไพโรจน์ ใจสิงห์) (15 September 1943 – 22 February 2021) was a Thai actor.

== Biography ==
Born in 1943 in Uttaradit Province, Jaisingha graduated from the Thailand National Sports University and became a teacher at the Sarawittaya School. While teaching, he would give performances to make extra money and made his film debut in 1971, alongside Sangthong Seesai. During the 1970s, he made numerous appearances in films, easily sustaining himself enough to quit his job as a teacher. In 1999, he became the primary presenter for Boon Rawd Brewery television advertisements. The ad was seen as humorous thanks to the similarity between the brand's Singha beer and his last name.

Jaisingha was married to Sotiros Nok, with whom he had nine children, one of whom, Krisada, is an indie music singer.

On 25 August 2013, Jaisingha was hospitalized from left hemisphere paralysis. He was treated at Veterans General Hospital, and was readmitted to Rajavithi Hospital after more health complications. He died in Bangkok on 22 February 2021, at the age of 78.

== Filmography ==
- Blackbirds at Bangpleng (1994)
- The Legend of Suriyothai (2001)
- The Legend of King Naresuan: Hostage of Hongsawadi (2007)
- Teng Nong kon maha hia (2007)
- Silamanee (2008)
- Torranee Ni Nee Krai Krong (2012)
