= Pisamai Vilaisak =

Thai actress

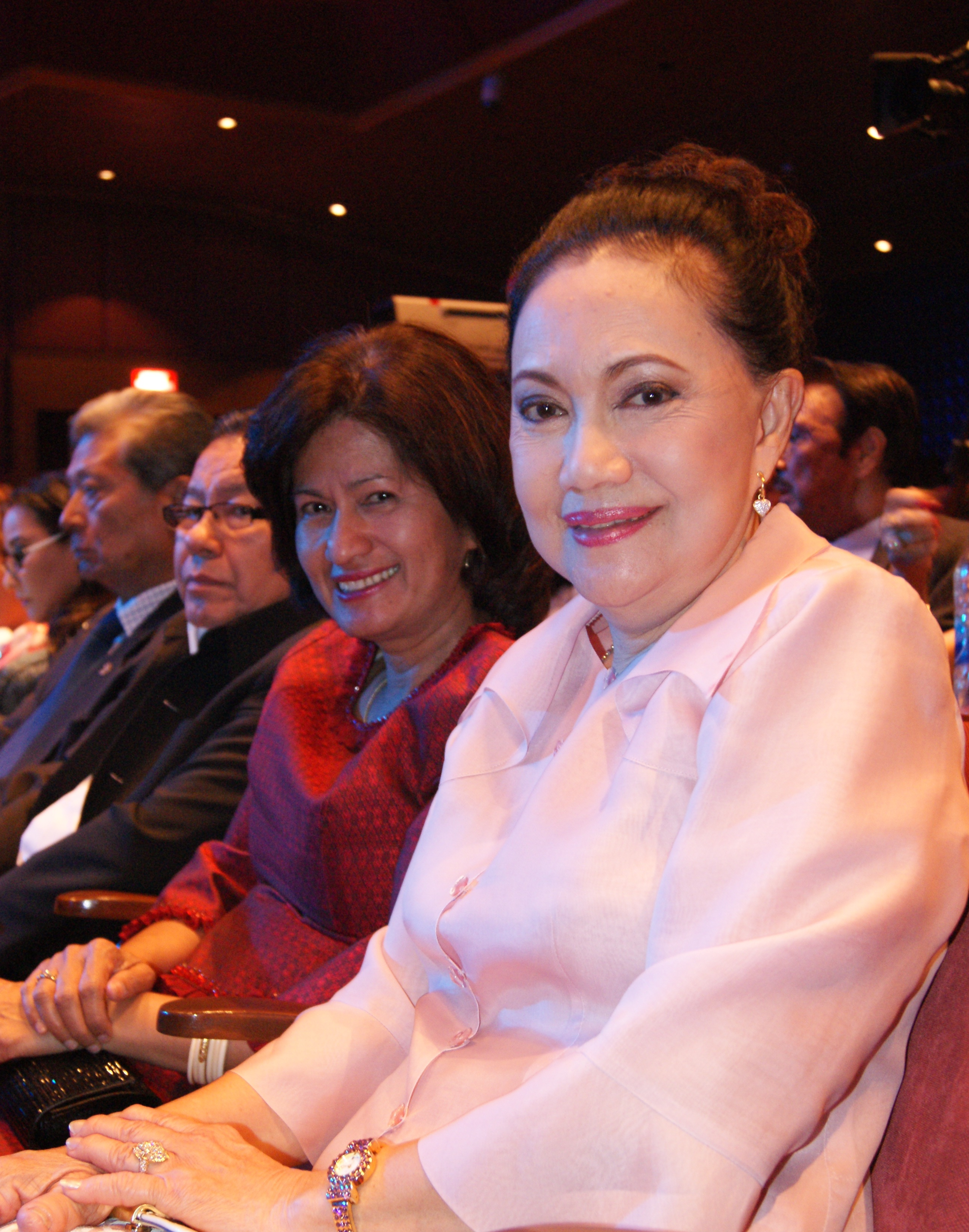
- Born: 7 December 1939 (age 86)
- Occupations: actress, singer, performing arts teacher
- Spouse: Suphan Brahmanphan
- Awards: National Artists Performing Arts (Film and TV Series) of 2010

Pisamai Vilaisak (Thai: พิศมัย วิไลศักดิ์; born 7 December 1939) is a Thai actress, Honorary Award Winner "Royal Golden Star" (ดาราทองพระราชทาน) as well as singing recording on record disc and is also a performing arts teacher, the owner of the nickname "Million Dollar Star" and another nickname in the later period is "Bette Davis of Thailand". She has acted in approximately 300 films over a period of more than 60 years. Pisamai Vilaisak was honored by the Office of the National Cultural Commission Ministry of Culture to be a 2010 National Artists Performing Arts (Film and TV series).

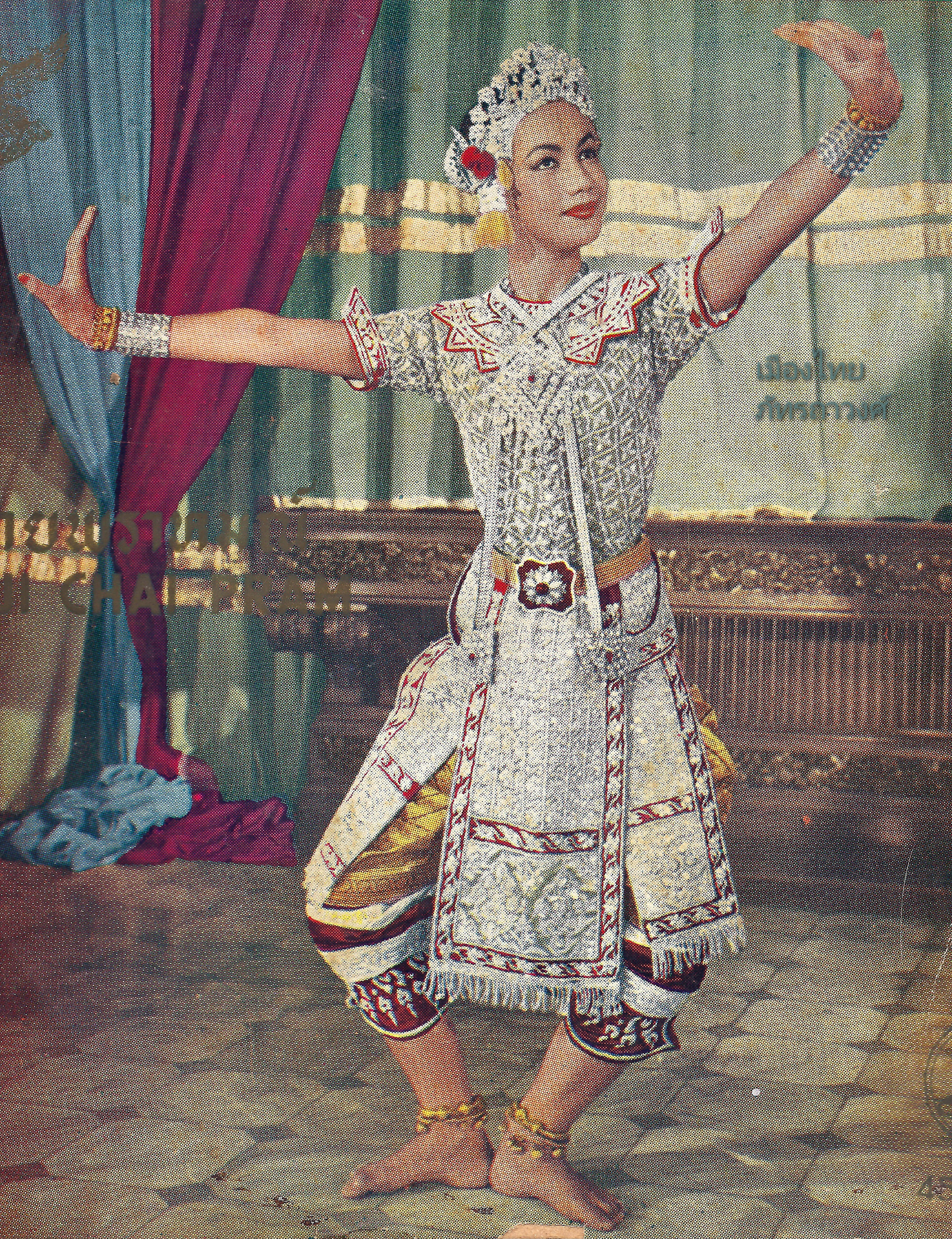
Pisamai Vilaisak, dance Chuichai Phram in her first film, Karaked in 1958.

Pisamai Vilaisak has been acting in movies, TV dramas and singing for over 60 years. The famous film works include Karaked (1958), Finger Nang (1961), Chamloei Rak (1963), Jai Phet (1963), Heavenly Eyes (1964), Son of a Slave (1964), Mongkut Phet (1965), Pimpilalai (1965), Khao Chum Thong Junction (1965), Sao Kruea Fah (1965), Dao Pra Sook (1966), Nohra (1966), Mekkhala (1967), Criminal Love (1967), Ok Thorranee (1968), Madame Yi Hub (1982), etc.

== Biography ==
Pisamai Vilaisak has been recognized and respected by everyone in the industry as the name of Mi, short for Mami, which means Mother, but the real nickname was Mhai, born on 7 December 1939, at the mosque alley, Wat Tong Pu, Bang Lamphu, Phra Nakhon district, Phra Nakhon Province (Bangkok at present). Father's name Nguan Vilaisak, trader, mother's name Pui Vilaisak, Pisamai was orphaned since childhood during World War II, which killed both her parents. Pisamai was then raised in the Grand Palace by Kru Chamrieng Puttpradab (national artist) between 1951 and 1955 Pisamai often referred to Kru Chamrieng as "Mae Kru". This made Pisamai and Mae Kru Chamrieng have a close and intimate relationship. Pisamai graduated from Bamrung Wittaya School and College of Dramatic Arts, Fine Arts Department.

Pisamai started acting in the drama Razadarit Ayedawbon, at that time, Pisamai was only 10 years old, acting as a supporting role as a soldier standing on pole, at the old theater next to the walls of the University of Moral Sciences and Politics (Thammasat University at present). Later, after Pisamai graduated from Bamrung Wittaya School has stepped into being a star at the School of Dramatic Arts, Pisamai acted as the heroine in the drama "Wan Kaew", "Khun Chang Khun Phaen" in the episode Plai Petch Plai Bua Out Suek. In the following years, she made the leading role as Phra Sang in the story Sangthong when fishing, after which she became famous from dance Chuichaibrahmin.

Pisamai Vilaisak acted the first movie from the persuade of a famous writer of that era, Sakkasem Hutakom, whose pen name was Ing-On, in 1957, by acting as the heroine of "Karaked", acting alongside two famous heroes of the era, That is Luchai Naruenat and Chana Sriubon, which her known for dance Chuichai scenes in this movie, the movie was shown for about 2 months in a row, earning more than 2 million baht for those days. It is considered one of the films that made the Thai film industry flourishing and made Pisamai born as a rising star heroine and became a leading actor in the Thai entertainment industry during the 50s and 60s.

Pisamai has later appeared in about 300 movies, playing all roles, including the heroine, the female lead, the villain and the mother roles in the latter. And every movie that was shown was popular with the audience until Cherd Songsri, a famous film director at that time, given nicknamed to her as "Million Dollar Star" as almost every movie she starred in earned more than a million baht, and later teenage fans gave her the nickname "Bette Davis of Thailand". Pisamai's famous works include Sorng Fang Fah (1960), Dutchanee Nang (1961), Chamloei Rak (1963), Heavenly Eyes (1964), Nohra (1966). In a number of movies, Pisamai used her special talents in Thai dances such as Nohra, Mekhala (1967), Sida (1968), Nueng Nuch (1971), Value of People (1971), Sakkhee Mae Ping (1971) and Daredevil Lam Hak (1975).

Pisamai Vilaisak, has the first recorded song on a record disc in 1958, namely the song Karaked, a petition composed by Kru Surat Pukkawes, a melody by Kru Sa-nga Arumphir for was the original soundtrack song of, Karaked movie. In 1961, singing cold lap (หนาวตัก) is a theme song in the movie Dutchanee Nang (ดรรชนีนาง) melody by Kru Samarn Kanchanaplin, petition written by Sakkasem Hutakom or Ing-On, who owns the novel.
