= Piak Poster =

Thai filmmaker, film poster artist and actor (1932–2026)

- เปี๊ยก โปสเตอร์
- Born: Somboonsuk Niyomsiri; 18 October 1932; Chiang Mai, Siam
- Died: 24 September 2026 (aged 93); Pak Chong, Nakhon Ratchasima Province, Thailand
- Other name: Piak Poster
- Education: Poh-Chang Academy
- Occupations: Filmmaker; film poster artist; actor
- Years active: 1953–2011
- Awards: Golden Doll Award (1973); Bangkok Critics Assembly Awards (2011); National Artist (2015)

Somboonsuk Niyomsiri (Thai: สมบูรณ์สุข นิยมศิริ; 18 October 1932 – 24 September 2026), also known by the stage name Piak Poster (เปี๊ยก โปสเตอร์), was a Thai filmmaker, film poster artist and actor. In 2015, he was named a National Artist in the Performing Arts category.

== Early life and career ==
Born in Chiang Mai on 18 October 1932, at a time when Thailand was still officially known as Siam. He graduated from Poh-Chang Academy of Arts in Bangkok (now Poh-Chang Academy of Arts, Rajamangala University of Technology Rattanakosin). He began working as a film poster artist in 1953, creating posters for both Thai and foreign films, with his work eventually numbering more than 1,000 films. Among them was the Thai release of The Last Sunset (1961), a Western drama starring Rock Hudson and Kirk Douglas. His hand-painted poster for the film was displayed at Sala Chaloem Thai on Ratchadamnoen Avenue to promote its theatrical release in Thailand.

Poster later turned to directing films and became known for launching the careers or reviving the popularity of several actors. He began with Tone (1970), which helped bring Chaiya Suriyan back to prominence. The film also featured Sangthong Seesai, who performed songs for its soundtrack, and Duang (1971), which marked the acting debut of Pairoj Jaisingha. Another notable actor he worked with was Pairoj Sangworibut, who starred in Wai Onlawon (1976), a youth film set in the 1970s. Among his notable works in the following decade was Something About Art (1988), which focused on the lives of art students at Silpakorn University (SU). The film was successful enough to receive a sequel the following year. In 1984, he co-founded the National Film Archive and became the first person to donate film reels for preservation. He went on to become the individual who donated the largest number of film reels to the archive. He also served as the second-unit director for the 2001 Thai historical epic The Legend of Suriyothai.

In 2015, he was named a National Artist in the Performing Arts category. Overall, he was involved in 32 films throughout his career.

As an actor, he also appeared in several films. In 2011, he played Thueang, an elderly man who guided Top on his path to becoming a young billionaire businessman, in The Billionaire. His performance earned him the Best Supporting Actor award from the Bangkok Critics Assembly.

== Later life and death ==
After retiring from film, he moved to Pak Chong in Nakhon Ratchasima and returned to painting portraits for clients. Poster died on 24 September 2026, at the age of 93.
