= Secret Sunday =

- Thai film poster
- Directed by: Saranyu Jiralaksanakul
- Written by: Teepanun Petchsri; Saranyoo Jiralak; Areeya Pornsiriwiwat
- Produced by: Sirippakorn Wongchariyawat
- Starring: James Alexander; Siraphun Wattanjinda
- Narrated by: Oriental Eyes Company
- Cinematography: Pramett Chankrasae
- Edited by: Phairach Khumwan; Purin Chaichayanon
- Music by: Montonn Jira
- Distributed by: American Film Market
- Release date: 28 February 2010
- Running time: 110 minutes
- Country: Thailand
- Language: Thai

Secret Sunday (or Number 9) (Thai: 9 วัด; translit. 9 wat; English: 9 temples), a 2010 Thai horror film, is a directorial debut from screenwriter Saranyu Jiralaksanakul and stars Siraphun Wattanajinda and James Alexander.

== Plot ==
The film begins with three men in an art gallery, where one of the men is explaining his performance art exhibition to the other two. The three men are attacked by a monstrous figure.

A woman walks with a monk in a forest and talks to him about her concern for her son after a disturbing dream.

A young woman named Poon is swimming laps at a pool when a mysterious figure appears to her. After showering, Poon again sees mysterious figures, who turn out to be her friends and her boyfriend Nat playing a trick on her. They convince her to go to a club with them even though she doesn't want to.

After they leave the club, Poon convinces Nat to visit his mother. Nat doesn't want to, but they go visit anyway. His mother is the woman who was speaking to the monk about her son, and it is obvious that she does not approve of Poon. Nat's mother asks him to visit the temples, to which he begrudgingly agrees.

After Nat and Poon pay their respects at the first temple, Nat meets a novice monk in the forest. He soon realizes that the monk is Sujitto, an old friend of his. Sujitto joins Nat and Poon on their journey. The three continue on their road trip to another temple, where Nat and Sujitto experience very disturbing visions. They continue on their journey; on the way to the fifth temple the car's windshield is broken by three troublemakers on motorbikes. Nat chases them but they get away. Nat and Poon drop the monk off at a temple, then take the car back to the mechanic in town for repairs.

At a small bar, Nat and Poon have a disagreement. She goes outside to smoke a cigarette, where a ghostly figure is watching her from the balcony above her. Poon returns to the bar and continues the argument with Nat. There's a blackout, and Poon falls. Nat carries her upstairs to the bedroom. Nat and Poon start to get intimate, while the figure of a ghostly child watches them.

The next morning they go to a cafe, but Poon vomits on the street. Nat asks if she's pregnant, but she dodges the question. They go to pick up Sujitto, who has agreed to attend a funeral for a family. Nat and Poon transport Sujitto and two other monks to the funeral, which takes them into the night. Nat thinks he sees the young man who damaged his windshield and pursues him into an old fishery, where he falls into the water and is overrun by eels. He disappears into the water. Poon finds Nat in the temple at the funeral, bleeding from the head. Nat realizes that the funeral was for the boy he was chasing.

They leave the temple with Poon driving. Poon hits a calf in the road, and sees the mother standing on the side of the road watching. Poon gets very upset, and they attempt to take the calf to get help. The man they've found to help slaughters the calf instead, saying it was too late and that he wanted to keep the animal from suffering.

They continue on to the next temple, where Poon is trying to make spiritual amends for killing the cow. She is attacked by a deformed, decomposed child-sized demon-like figure, who shows her disturbing images of a young boy with burns on half his face being abused by his mother. She wakes up and asks Sujitto what is happening; he tells her that Karma is mysterious and beyond reason. She and Nat get into a physical confrontation and Poon slaps Nat, who leaves her and Sujitto behind.

Nat decides to track down Poon and Sujitto, and they continue on to the next temple when they hit something else in the road. Poon wanders off and is attacked again. This time it is revealed that she is reliving the abuse and death of the young, burned boy she saw in her vision back at the previous temple. Poon believes that she is seeing images of her past life.She reveals to Nat that she's pregnant and was considering an abortion, which she thinks is the same thing that her "mother' did to her in her previous life.

The trio make it to the final temple, where Nat and Poon say goodbye to Sujitto, but Poon realizes that she is in the location of her vision, the place where the boy killed his father by knocking him off a roof, and his mother dragged him by a chain into the woods. She and Nat find the shack where the boy was left to die after his mother's suicide. Nat's mother arrives, and reveals that Nat is not her only son. Sujitto is also there, and he is revealed to be Nat's twin. Nat's mother left him at a monastery when he was an infant in order to try to cheat Karma. Sujitto realizes that he can not escape Karma, and Poon realizes that he's standing on a well. The well collapses, and Sujitto falls into the well, an expression of perfect peace on his face. Nat, Poon, and Nat's mother leave the temple. Nat gives his mother a present he'd been holding for a long time, and they continue the drive home.

== Cast ==
- Siraphun Wattanajinda as Poon
- James Alexander as Nat
- Penpak Sirikul as Nittaya
- James Max Nike
- Siri Penpakcook
- Paradorn Kowit Sira

== Release ==
The film premiered on February 28, 2010, and was released in the Thai Cinemas on April 13, 2010. In the United States it is distributed by American Film Market and was released as 9: Secret Sunday.
