= Edge of the Empire (film) =

- Directed by: Nirattisai Kaljareuk
- Produced by: Jareuk Kanjareuk
- Starring: Ad Carabao, Alisa Sontirod, Arnut Rapanit
- Cinematography: Paul Spurrier
- Music by: Giant Wave
- Release date: 28 April 2010
- Running time: 114 minutes
- Country: Thailand
- Language: Thai
- Budget: Unknown
- Box office: Unknown

Edge of the Empire is a 2010 Thai historical film directed by Nirattisai Kaljareuk. Set in southern Mongolia over 1,000 years ago, the story relates the history of the small tribe called Tai, a colony ruled by the Great Han at that time. This film shows how the Tai people, oppressed by their Han overlords, unite to fight for their freedom.

== Plot ==
A young warrior tries to stand up to a violent and oppressive empire in 12th-century Thailand. This is a violent 8th century uprising of a Thai tribe against the impending might of the Imperial Chinese army in a battle for supremacy between the war ravaged nations.

== Cast ==
- Ad Carabao
- Alisa Sontirod
- Arnut Rapanit
- Dilok Thongwattana
- Kanta Kaljareuk
- Sara Leigh
