= Paitoon Pumrat =

Thai-American actor and comedian (1965–2020)

- ไพฑูรย์ พุ่มรัตน์
- Born: 7 November 1965; Bangkok, Thailand
- Died: 19 September 2020 (aged 54); Bangkok, Thailand
- Other names: Robert Sai-Kwan; Robert Dokmadan; Mang Bangbua
- Occupations: Actor; comedian
- Years active: 1980s–2020
- Spouse: Jaew Phumrat (m. 1990–2020)
- Children: 2

Paitoon Pumrat (Thai: ไพฑูรย์ พุ่มรัตน์), stage name Robert Sai-kwan (โรเบิร์ต สายควัน), nickname Mang (หมั่ง) (7 November 1965 – 19 September 2020) was a Thai comedian and actor.

== Early life ==
He was born in a slum in Bangkok's Bang Khen neighbourhood, on 7 November 1965, to African-American father and Thai mother from Ang Thong. Later his parents moved to United States, so he and his younger-sister lived with their grandmother. His early life was very dark. He was not educated, and he used drugs.

== Career ==
He began as a local bus conductor and met with Noo Klongtoey, future one of the famous Thai comedians. He started in comedy on stage in 1980s with the persuasion of Sayan Dokmadan. He was a comedian until he returned to using drugs when persuaded by a friend and was jailed for drug possession. Since he wanted another chance in the comedy industry, he gave up the bad life and went for drug treatment, until he was finally cured, and he got a chance from Chatchai Chamnienkul or Ball Chernyim to return to the comedy industry again.

He has many films which include Saranae Hen Phee, Khun Bunlue, E Leam Sing etc. He was a regular actor of Thai popular sitcoms Laugh Co.Ultd. (Thai: บริษัทฮาไม่จำกัด, Borisat Ha Mai Chamkat).

== Illness and death ==
He was healing from lung cancer since August 2020, and seemed to be improving by 18 September 2020. However, the doctor found that he had tuberculosis and his health had deteriorated. He died on 19 September 2020, aged 54.

== Personal life ==
He married Jaew Phumrat, and they had two daughters.

== Filmography ==
=== Films ===
- 2008 - Saranae Hen Phee
- 2018 -
  - Bikeman
  - Khun Bunlue
- 2019 - Bikeman 2
- 2020 -
  - Luamg Phee Kap E Pob
  - E Leam Sing

=== Sitcoms ===
- 2017 to 2020 - Laugh Co.Ultd.
