= The Dumb Die Fast, The Smart Die Slow =

The Dumb Die Fast, The Smart Die Slow (Ka Lok Bang Tai Sha, Ka Lok Na Tai Korn)
- Directed by: Manop Udomdej
- Written by: Manop Udomdej
- Produced by: Thawatchai Rojanachotisakul
- Starring: Surasak Wongthai; Angkana Timdee; Kajornsak Rattananissai; Manop Asawatap
- Cinematography: Surapong Pinijkhar; Sutuch Intranupakorn
- Edited by: Surapong Pinijkhar
- Music by: Chamras Saewataporn
- Production company: TKR Group
- Distributed by: Apex Group
- Release date: 1991
- Running time: 118 minutes
- Country: Thailand
- Language: Thai

The Dumb Die Fast, The Smart Die Slow (Thai: กะโหลกบางตายช้า กะโหลกหนาตายก่อน) is a 1991 Thai film noir directed by Manop Udomdej.

== Summary ==
The story takes place in 1983, Salak and Tuang work together to gain access to a company's safe, but are caught and jailed. Later, Salak escapes, but he is hunted by the police, so Salak flees to the Betong district. He finds work in a gas station by owner by a man named Boonpreng. Boonpreng is a good man with good morals and has a beautiful wife named Chanang. Salak lies and says that his name is Charan, working hard to be trusted by Boonpreng. Everyday Boonpreng keeps money in the safe by Chanang which she can't open and doesn't know what's inside, but she believes that there must be a lot of money in there. When she realizes that, in fact, “Charan” was a prisoner who had escaped from jail, she tells him about the safe and offers a share of the money. Salak refuses.

Later, she kills Boonpreng with Salak's help. Both of them quietly bury Boonpreng at the gas station, then try to open the safe. Eventually, Tuang gets out of jail and discovers Salak and Chanang at the station. Tuang begins work at the station, without knowing all that has happened. In the end, the secret could not be hidden, and the three of them betray and kill each other.

== Cast ==
- Surasak Wongthai as Salak, Charan
- Angkana Timdee as Chanang
- Kajornsak Rattananissai as Tuang
- Manop Asawatap as Boonpreng

== Reception and awards ==
The Dumb Die Fast, The Smart Die Slow was named as the first Thai film noir, the plot was inspired by The Postman Always Rings Twice (1981), but when it was released it didn't succeed in terms of revenue. Maybe because the audiences at the moment aren't familiar with the film in this genre.

This film is Thailand's representative to contest the 36th Asia-Pacific Film Festival 1991 in Taipei, Republic of China was awarded special film (Special Award for Stylistic Integrity).
