= Dangerous Years (1996 film) =

- Theatrical release poster
- Directed by: Nopphorn Wathin
- Screenplay by: Marayat Thainiwatwilai
- Based on: เด็กเสเพล by Chatchai Wiset Suvarnabhumi
- Produced by: Charoen Iamphungporn
- Starring: Chanit Yaisamer; Karen Klongtrudrok
- Distributed by: Five Star Production
- Release date: 21 August 1996
- Running time: 117 minutes
- Country: Thailand
- Language: Thai

Dangerous Years (Thai: เด็กเสเพล, or Dek seple) is a 1996 Thai drama film directed by Nopphorn Wathin. Based upon a novel by Chatchai Wiset Suvarnabhumi that was originally adapted for the big screen in 1960, the film follows a displaced teen who enters a life of crime. It was remade into a television series of the same name in 2020.

== Plot ==
At a border village, there is an outbreak of violence between the Royal Thai Armed Forces and the communist movement. During the conflict, Sak's wife and daughter are killed. However, unknowingly to him, his son is able to escape.

Given the name Tin, Sak's son is raised in poverty and becomes part of a gang of thieves. One day, Tin assaults a woman and steals her purse. He eludes the police by hiding in a school where Sak happens to be teaching. From that point on, Sak tries to convince Tin that the life of a criminal is not something he should pursue.

== Cast ==
- Chanit Yaisamer as Tin
- Karen Klongtruadroke as Kobkul
- Pisan Akaraseranee as Sak Sujaritkul
- Bawriboon Chanreuang as Jon
- Kett Thantup as Por
- Ronapop Ruj as Uncle Chod
- Ae Pairot Sangwariboot as Boonkeua
- Tuk Deuntem Salitul as Wanida

== Music ==
The film features music by Thai boy band Boyscout, which consisted of actor Chanit Yaisamer as one of its three members. A soundtrack album was released in 1996 by RS Music.

== Reception ==
Chanit Yaisamer won "Outstanding Performance by an Actor in a Leading Role" at the 6th Suphannahong National Film Awards, which was held in April 1997.
