= 3 A.M. 3D =

2012 Thai film

- Theatrical release poster
- Directed by: Patchanont Tummajira; Kirati Nakintanon; Isara Nadee
- Produced by: Kiattikamon Eiampuangporn; Sirawat Nakintanon; Vichien Nakintanon
- Starring: Apinya Sakuljaroensuk; Focus Jeerakul; Vivid Bavornkiratikajorn; Thannawat Prasittisomporn; Nayapak Bhumipak; Karnklao Duaysianklao; Tony Rakkaen; Peter Knight; Chakrit Yamnam; Ray MacDonald; Prachakorn Piyasakulkaew; Kanyarin Nithioparath
- Production company: Five Star Production
- Release date: November 22, 2012
- Running time: 96 minutes
- Country: Thailand
- Language: Thai
- Box office: $2,084,774

3 A.M. 3D (Thai: ตีสาม 3D) is a 2012 Thai 3D horror anthology film directed by Patchanon Tummajira, Kirati Nakintanon, and Isara Nadee, and produced by Five Star Production. It consists of three short films with distinct themes, united by the common motif of the witching hour, a time traditionally associated with supernatural occurrences.

It was followed by two films, 3 AM: Part 2 (2014) and 3 AM: Part 3 (2018).

== Plot ==
The film is divided into three stories: "The Wig", "Corpse Bride", and "O.T." None of the stories intersect; however, they do have a common motif of having supernatural things occur around 3 a.m.

=== "The Wig" ===
Sisters May (Focus Jirakul) and Mint (Apinya Sakuljaroensuk) are left to run their family business, a wig shop, while their parents are on a vacation in China. A customer offers to sell May some human hair of great quality, without knowledge that the hair was illegally salvaged from a female corpse, and that the salvager seemingly committed suicide. May works overtime weaving the new wig, but a female apparition haunts her, presumably the owner of the hair. Mint then returns with three friends to continue partying at home, and May is infuriated as one of the friends carelessly toys with a wig. After the sisters argue, Mint orders her friend to return the wig to its rightful place, but finds him decapitated in the stock room as he fails to return. The ghost now torments the remaining party of four, then killing Mint's remaining two friends. The sisters then seek refuge in the kiln dry room, and the female ghost traps May inside the kiln dryer. Mint attempts to pry open the door in vain, and the machine overheats and explodes. The impact slams Mint towards the wall, but May is nowhere to be seen. Awaken to the sound of her parents' return, Mint tries to explain last night's ordeal, but is disturbed by a distraught May, and the fact that everyone ignores her. Mint realizes that she has died from the explosion, being impaled by a glass shard, and that the ghost now inhabits May's body.

=== "The Corpse Bride" ===
Junior mortician Tod (Tony Rakkaen) is assigned to be stationed at the bridal home of Mike (Peter Knight) and Cherry (Karnklao “Grace” Duaysianklao), an engaged couple who died a week before their wedding. While performing rituals and maintenance, Tod opens Cherry's coffin in an attempt to oust an intruding lizard, but is infatuated with Cherry's beauty. After seeing a dream of Cherry crying for help and uncovering some clues suggesting Mike was jealous and abusive, Tod separates the couple and gets intimate with Cherry's corpse, hoping to at least save Cherry from Mike even after death. As Tod sleeps with Cherry's corpse one night, Tod goes into the hallway to check on some noise, only to be frightened by Mike's ghost. After retreating into the bedroom, Cherry drags Tod under the bed and stabs his ankle. A frightened Tod then bumps into Mike's corpse, only to be struck by a revelation: Mike bounded Cherry not over jealousy, but to prevent her from committing suicide. After Mike unties Cherry out of guilt and sympathy, Cherry overpowers Mike and breaks a glass figurine. Mike struggles to get the glass shard from Cherry's hand, only to have Cherry slash his jugular veins. Cherry then proceeds to slit her own throat and dies. Cherry then asks whether Tod no longer loves her in the same manner she did Mike. Revealing her now rotten face, she kisses Tod, causing him to faint out of fright. Tod awakens and panics as he is trapped inside a coffin, with Cherry sitting on top, claiming her new lover.

=== "O.T." ===
Executives Karan (Chakrit Yamnam) and Tee (Ray MacDonald) take pleasure in playing ghostly pranks on their employees on a daily basis. After scaring off Bump (Prachakorn Piyasakulkaew) and Ging (Kanyarin Nithinaparath) with a floating head, they proceed to spook a transsexual employee. Rejoicing their success in pulling off such pranks, Bump and Ging make a failed attempt to spook them, and then claim that they returned to prepare documents for tomorrow's meeting. After Tee and Karan plays a gruesome prank by pretending to be ghosts, they decide to return home. However, while in the elevator, both Karan and Tee each receive a phone call, saying that Bump and Ging were found dead under the stairs. It turns out that Bump and Ging fell off the stairs and plummeted into the first floor after being frightened from Karan and Tee's floating head prank. Realizing the two employees behind them are already dead, Karan reaches for the buttons to get off, but is hindered by Bump. The short ends showing the elevator descending into the darkness

== Sequels ==
A second film, entitled 3 AM: Part 2 was released in January 2014. The film also features three segments: "The Third Night", "The Convent", and "The Offering", and was directed by Isara Nadee, Kirati Nakintanon, and Putipong Saisikaew. A third film, entitled 3 AM: Part 3 (also known as After Shock) was released on March 15, 2018. The film features three more segments: "Expressway", "One Night Stand", and "TV Direct", and was directed by Phawat Panangkasiri, Thammanoon Sukulboontanom, and Nitivat Cholvanichsiri.

== See also ==
- List of ghost films
