= Susira Naenna =

Thai actress

- Born: Susira Angelina Naenna; July 30, 1987 (age 39); Chiang Mai, Thailand
- Other name: Susie
- Occupations: Actress; host
- Years active: 2008–present
- Agent(s): Broadcast Thai Television; Channel 3 (2008–2017)

Susira Angelina Naenna (Thai: สุษิรา แอนจิลีน่า แน่นหนา; born 30 July 1987), nicknamed Susie, is a Thai-English actress, model and television presenter.

== Eternal link ==
- Official website
- Susira Naenna on Instagram
