= Lor Tok =

Thai comedian and actor

- ล้อต๊อก
- Born: Sawong Supsamruay Thai: สวง ทรัพย์สำรวย; 1 April 1914; Bangkok Yai, Bangkok, Siam
- Died: 29 April 2002 (aged 88); Chachoengsao, Thailand
- Occupations: Comedian; actor

Sawong Supsamruay (Thai: สวง ทรัพย์สำรวย, RTGS: Sawong Sapsamruai; born April 1, 1914 – April 29, 2002), better known as Lor Tok (Thai: ล้อต๊อก, RTGS: Lo Tok), was a Thai comedian and actor. He was named a Thailand National Artist for performing arts in 1995. With an acting career that stretched from the 1930s into the 1980s, Lor Tok had roles in more than 1,000 films, among them Ngern, Ngern, Ngern (Money, Money, Money, 1983 version), for which he received an award for best actor at the Thailand National Film Association Awards.

== Biography ==
=== Early life ===
Born Sawong Supsamruay (สวง ทรัพย์สำรวย) in Ban Suan Klong, Bangkok Yai, Lor Tok was the third of five children of an orchardist. As a boy, he climbed coconut trees and learned to play traditional Thai musical instruments.

He attended Wat Nuan Noradit School until Mattayom 3 (the equivalent of ninth grade) and then went to work on the family orchard. After floods wiped out the orchard, Lor Tok worked on a river pier, helping to moor ferry boats. Other occupations included boatman on the Pasi Charoen canal, a trishaw driver in Nakhon Ratchasima and professional boxer. He is said to have often walked from Nakhon Ratchasima to Bangkok on foot, a journey that took three days. He also served in the Royal Thai Army.

=== Comedy and film career ===
Lor Tok joined a comedy troupe and began performing with another popular comedian of the day, Jok Dokchan. He was acclaimed for his stage performance in the comic play, Klai Glua Kin Dang (Near Good Salt, Eat Bad Salt). Due to this role, a senior actor gave him his stage name.

His film debut was in 1933 in Wan Chakayan. Other films were Panan, Yod Phi, Hong Fah, Phra Apaimanee and Roy Khan.

Among his more famous roles were the 1985 remake of the musical comedy Ngern, Ngern, Ngern (เงิน เงิน เงิน), for which he won best actor at the Thailand National Film Association Awards. He portrayed an unscrupulous moneylender whose son falls in love with a debtor and ends up taking sides against his father. He had also had a smaller role in the original 1965 film. Lor Tok won a Tuktathong ("Golden Doll") award for his role as a Chinese merchant in Go Hub. He played the lead role in the 007 spoof, James Band and was the title character in the comedy horror, Dracula Tok. In the early 1980s, he acted in the acclaimed Luang ta duology, in which he portrayed a wise Buddhist monk.

He established his own production company in 1969 called Tok Boom Parpayon. Among the films he directed was Luk Kuey, which starred Mitr Chaibancha and Petchara Chaowarat. He was popular on television in the 1980s, appearing in the shows "Nateethong" and "Traduduang".

=== Personal life ===
Lor Tok was described as short and dark skinned, with black hair and often sported a pencil moustache. His good humor won him an admirer in Somjit, a statuesque actress, model and beauty contest winner. They married and had three children.

At the end of his life Lor Tok suffered from emphysema due to smoking. On April 28, he was admitted to Sotharavej Hospital in Chachoengsao after collapsing while rehearsing for a khon masked dance performance, and he died at the hospital the next day.

Shortly after his death, a cartoon series based on his Dracula Tok character was developed.

== Tribute ==
On 1 April 2019, search engine Google commemorated Sawong "Lor Tok" Supsamruay with a Doodle on his 105th birth anniversary.
