= Blackbirds at Bangpleng =

- A promotional one-sheet image.
- Directed by: Niratisai Kanjareuk
- Written by: Wanit Jaroong-Git-Anun; Kukrit Pramoj (novel)
- Produced by: Jareuk Kanjareuk; Surang Prempree
- Cinematography: Tanit Poo-sara
- Edited by: Niratisai Kanjareuk
- Music by: Jaran Manopet
- Distributed by: Kantana
- Release date: 1994
- Running time: 132 minutes
- Country: Thailand
- Language: Thai

Blackbirds at Bangpleng (Thai: กาเหว่าที่บางเพลง; RTGS: Ka Wao Thi Bang Phleng), Kāh̄eẁā thī̀ bāng phelng - Check Out Some Songs is a 1994 Thai science fiction horror film. Though it is based on a novel by the famous Thai writer and politician Kukrit Pramoj, the story closely mirrors the 1957 novel The Midwich Cuckoos by John Wyndham, which itself was adapted into the 1960 film, Village of the Damned.

== Plot ==
A village in rural Thailand is celebrating Loy Krathong, when the festivities are disrupted by the descent of a spaceship. Ray beams are fired from the craft and all the village's women find they are suddenly pregnant. Only a few hours later the women give birth. The alien offspring have the power to kill by just staring and they have an insatiable appetite for raw meat.
