= Kantana Group =

Thai production company

Kantana Group Public Company Limited
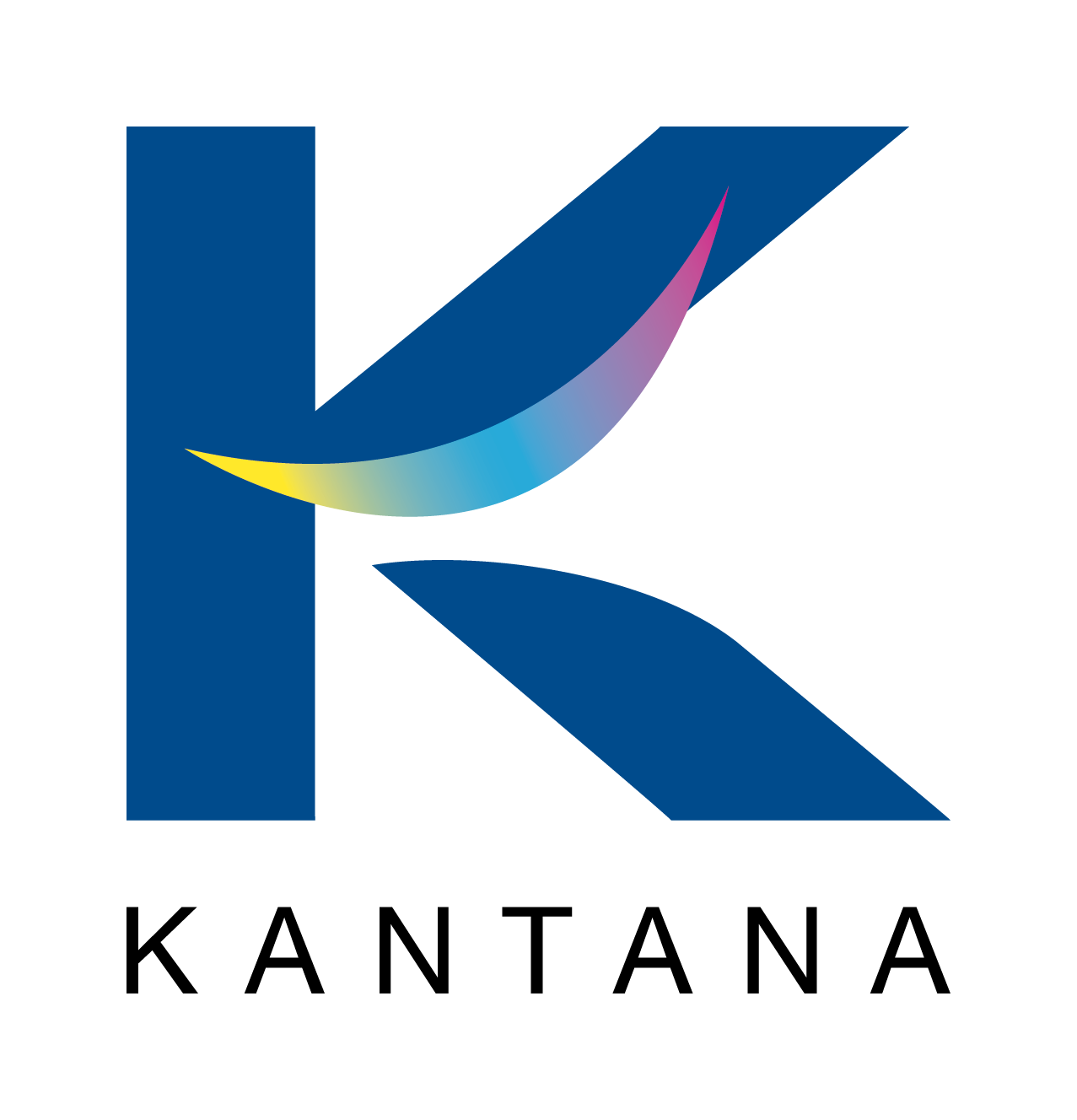
- Company type: Public company
- Industry: Television, Film, Education, Content Management, New Biz
- Founded: 1951; 75 years ago
- Headquarters: Bangkok, Thailand
- Key people: Somchat Intrathut, chairman Somsook Kaljaruek, co-founder and honourable chairman
- Subsidiaries: Kantana Media and Marketing; Kantana Movie Town (2002); Kantana Production Service; Kantana Evolution; Farm Channel; Miracle Channel; Sara-D; Mica Media; Lasta Multimedia Joint-Stock (Vietnam); Major Kantana Broadcasting; Kantana Post Production (Thailand); Kantana Post Production (Shanghai); Kantana Post Production (Vietnam); Kantana Sound Studio; Kantana Animation Studios; Kantana Motion Pictures; Kantana Edutainment (International); Kantana Institute; Kantana Training Center; Kantana JK Consulting Management; Kantana Organizer and Management
- Website: http://www.kantana.com/

Kantana Group is a production company established in Bangkok, Thailand in 1951 by Pradit and Somsook Kaljaruek. Kantana took its first step from radio dramas to films, television dramas, variety programs, and eventually moved on to become an integrated entertainment company.

== History ==
Kantana began in 1951 as a radio drama troupe founded by Pradit and Somsook Kaljaruek. The company branched out into television in 1958 with the drama series Ying Kor Mee Hua Jai.

The company has since expanded to include the production of feature films, commercials and documentaries.

== Structure ==
The business operations of the company and its subsidiaries are divided into three core areas: television production, film and post production, and "edutainment" and government relations.

=== Television ===
==== Family and variety programs ====
Family and variety shows are produced for Thai television channel 5 (Royal Thai Army TV), BBTV Channel 7 and TITV. The shows include the cartoon series, The Adventure of Khan Kluay.

==== Drama series ====
Around 18 drama series, or lakorns are produced for BBTV Channel 7 and TITV.

=== Film ===
==== Kantana Animation Studios ====
Kantana Animation produced the first Thai computer-animated feature film in 2006, Khan Kluay, which took three years and cost 150 million baht to make. Khan Kluay was the top film at the Thailand box office in 2006, earning 91 million baht, and winning several awards. Also, a Khan Kluay television series was created for BBTV Channel 7. Kantana Animation was spun off into its own subsidiary in 2007, Kantana Animation Studios Company, Limited.

==== Post-production ====
Kantana is a hub for film post-production services in Asia. Kantana's film lab provides overlay subtitling, negative cutting, color analysis, digital intermediate processing, optical effects, sound transfer, film cleaning and film print copying. The facility has provided lab work on such films as Memoirs of a Geisha, Superman Returns, Casino Royale, Echo Planet and dozens of Thai feature films.

The company's sound studio provides audio dubbing and mixing services for feature films, television shows and commercials, including recording, sound effects, foley, sound design and voice dubbing/ADR. Kantana was the first Thai company to receive permission from Dolby Laboratories to record sound using Dolby technology.

==== Oriental Post ====
Oriental Post Company, Ltd., which is 50-50 joint venture by Kantana and Loxley Video Post, provides digital post production facilities. The services include digital compositing in PAL, NTSC, HD 24p in multi-format, telecine, digital editing and special effects creation. Using digital intermediate technology, Oriental Post's services also include film processing, scanning conforming, color correction, offline and online editing, digital effects, computer graphics and audio recording to film printing. The company has provided post-production work on the films of Wong Kar-wai, 2046 and My Blueberry Nights.

== Franchise ==
=== Drag Race ===
- Chile
  - The Switch Drag Race
- Thailand
  - Drag Race Thailand
- United States
  - RuPaul's Drag Race
  - RuPaul's Drag U
  - RuPaul's Drag Race: All Stars

=== The Next Boy/Girl Band ===
| Country/Region | Local title | Network | Winners | Coaches | Hosts |
|---|---|---|---|---|---|
| Indonesia | The Next Boy/Girl Band Indonesia (The Next Boy/Girl Band Indonesia) | GTV | Season 1, 2017: (gold) B Force; Season 2, 2018: (silver) XCITE | Current; Anindyo Baskoro (1–); Armand Maulana (1); Denada Tambunan (1–); Dewi Gita (2–) | Current; Boy William (1–); Conchita Caroline (1–) |
| Indonesia | The Next Boy/Girl Band Indonesia (The Next Boy/Girl Band Indonesia) | GTV | Season 1, 2017: (silver) Soulsisters; Season 2, 2018: (gold) SNG | Current; Gamaliel Tapiheru (1–); Melly Goeslaw (1–); Widi Mulia (1); Vidi Aldiano (2–) | Current; Boy William (1–); Conchita Caroline (1–) |
| Netherlands | The Next Boy/Girl Band Netherlands (The Next Boy/Girl Band Netherlands) | SBS6 | Season 1, 2016: (gold) 4U | Babette Labeij (1); Nick Schilder (1); Tony Berk (1) | Tim Douwsma (1); Nicolette van Dam (1) |
| Netherlands | The Next Boy/Girl Band Netherlands (The Next Boy/Girl Band Netherlands) | SBS6 | Season 1, 2016: (silver) GRLBND | John Ewbank (1); Pip Pellens (1); Sharon Doorson (1) | Tim Douwsma (1); Nicolette van Dam (1) |
| Thailand | The Next Boy/Girl Band Thailand (เดอะเน็กซ์บอย/เกิร์ลแบนด์ ไทยแลนด์) | Channel 7 | Season 1, 2018: Teamboy | Current; Metinee Kingpayom (1–); Tata Young (1–); Antoine Pinto (1–); Khanngern Nuarnaun (1–) | Current; Natthaya Boonchompaisarn (1–); Bank Sangnimnuan (1–) |
| Thailand | The Next Boy/Girl Band Thailand (เดอะเน็กซ์บอย/เกิร์ลแบนด์ ไทยแลนด์) | Channel 7 | Season 1, 2018: Teamgirl | Current; Sonia Couling (1–); Jetrin Wattanasin (1–); Natee Aekwijit (1–); Nicole Theriault (1–) | Current; Natthaya Boonchompaisarn (1–); Bank Sangnimnuan (1–) |
