= The Next Boy/Girl Band Thailand =

- Genre: Singing Competition
- Created by: John de Mol Jr.
- Presented by: Natthaya Boonchompaisarn; Bank Sangnimnuan
- Judges: Metinee Kingpayom; Sonia Couling; Jetrin Wattanasin; Tata Young; Nicole Theriault; Khanngern Nuarnaun; Natee Aekwijit; Antoine Pinto
- Country of origin: Thailand
- Original language: Thai
- No. of series: 1

Production
- Executive producer: Piyarat Kaljaruek
- Running time: 90 mins
- Production company: Kantana Group

Original release
- Network: Channel 7
- Release: 3 June 2018 – present

The Next Boy/Girl Band Thailand is a Thai reality television series on the Channel 7 television network. It was premiered on 3 June 2018. The show is the Thailand version of The Next Boy/Girl Band Netherlands. The series was licensed by the Kantana Group.

== Host ==
- Natthaya Boonchompaisarn (Grace The Face Thailand season 3)
- Bank Sangnimnuan (Bank The Face Men Thailand)

== Producer ==
Team	Producer	Season
Team	Producer	1
Teamboy	Metinee Kingpayom	✔
Teamboy	Tata Young	✔
Teamboy	Khanngern Nuarnaun (Thaitanium)	✔
Teamboy	Antoine Pinto	✔
Teamgirl	Sonia Couling	✔
Teamgirl	Jetrin Wattanasin	✔
Teamgirl	Nicole Theriault	✔
Teamgirl	Natee Aekwijit (Buddha Bless)	✔

== Season 1 ==
=== Contestants ===
Team	Elimination						
Teamboy	Toto	Cooper	Kaownah	Lotte	Green	Peter	First
Teamgirl	Toey	Jeepfie	Celina	Fresh	Claudia	Plaifah	Ploy

Team	Semifinal					
Teamboy	Toto	Cooper	Kaownah	Lotte	Peter	First
Teamgirl	Toey	Jeepfie	Fresh	Claudia	Plaifah	Ploy

Team	Final 5				
Teamboy	Toto	Kaonah	Lotte	Peter	First
Teamgirl	Toey	Fresh	Claudia	Plaifah	Ploy

=== Winner ===
Teamgirl	Toey	Fresh	Claudia	Plaifah	Ploy

=== Bands ===
- The Next Boyband
- The Next Girlband
