= Amata Corporation =

Thai industrial real-estate company

Amata Corporation PCL
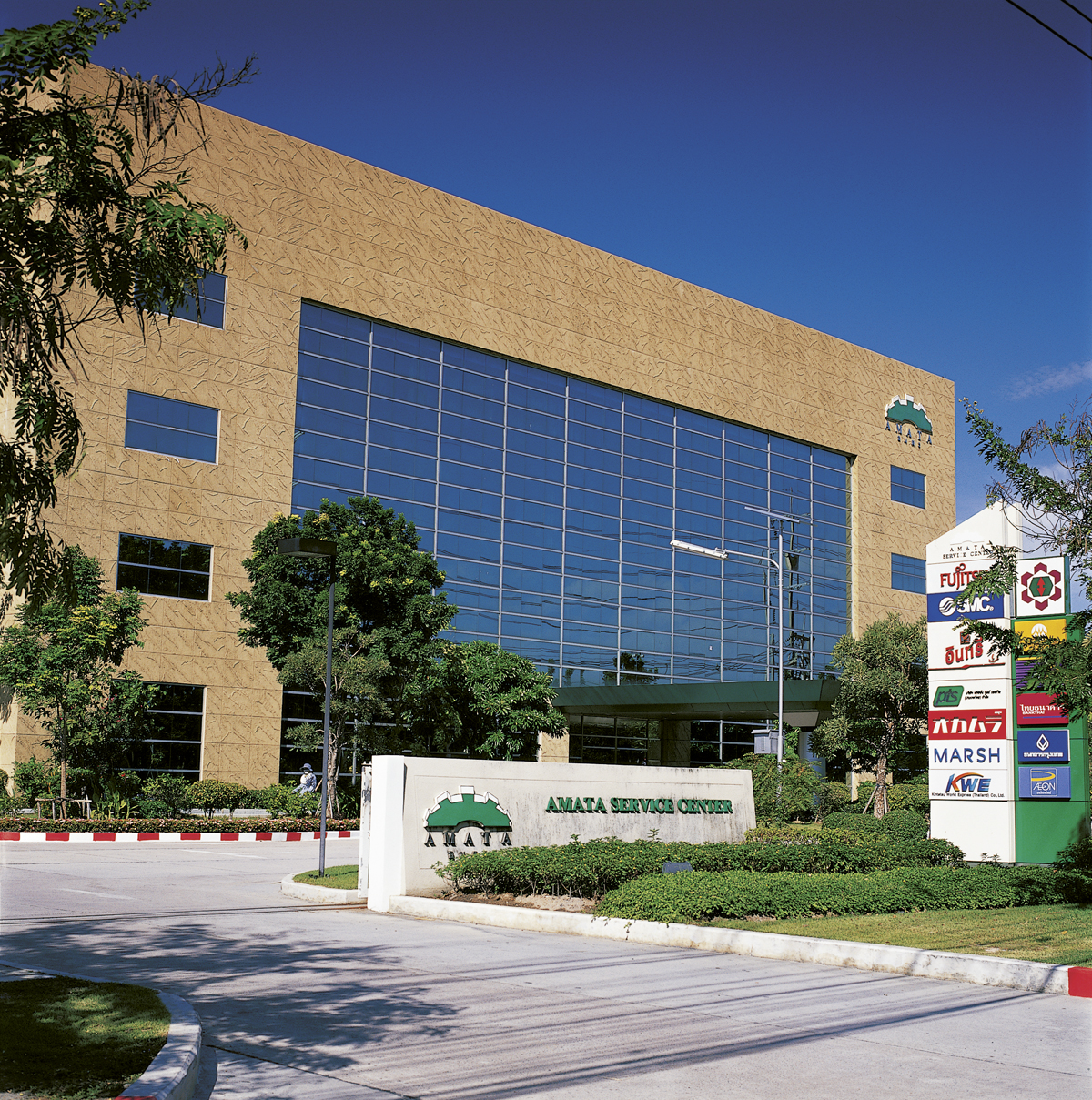
- Amata Corporation headquarters
- Native name: อมตะ คอร์ปอเรชั่น
- Formerly: Bangpakong Industrial Park
- Company type: Public SET: AMATA
- Industry: Industrial Estate Development
- Founded: 6 March 1989
- Founder: Vikrom Kromadit
- Headquarters: 2126 Kromadit Building, New Petchburi Road, Bangkapi, Huai Khwang, Bangkok, Thailand
- Number of locations: 3
- Website: Official website

The AMATA Corporation Public Company Limited (AMATA) (Thai: อมตะ คอร์ปอเรชั่น จำกัด (มหาชน)) is a Thai industrial estate provider headquartered in Bangkok. The meaning of Amata in Thai is "eternity". The company was established on 6 March 1989 by Vikrom Kromadit.

== Overview ==
AMATA Corporation PCL, formerly known as Bangpakong Industrial Park, is located between Bangkok and Laem Chabang deep sea port near the main road from Bangkok to Chonburi. The company specializes in planning, developing, managing and marketing integrated industrial estates. It is considered one of Asia's most successful large-scale industrial development regions and the regional finalist for East Asia.

AMATA hosts more than 1,500 factories in twelve locations:

1. AMATA City Chonburi, Chonburi
2. AMATA City Chonburi 2, Chonburi
3. AMATA Smart City Chonburi, Chonburi
4. AMATA City Rayong, Rayong
5. Nonglalok Industrial Estate, Rayong
6. AMATA City Bien Hoa, Bien Hoa
7. AMATA City Long Thanh, Long Thanh
8. AMATA City Ha Long, Halong
9. AMATA City Phu Tho, Phu THo
10. AMATA City Namor, Namor
11. AMATA City Natuey, Natuey
12. Yangon Amata Smart and Eco City, Yangon

The company operates in both Thailand and Vietnam and hosts global clients from the automotive, healthcare, and food and beverages industries. The present registered capital is ฿1,067,000,000. The estate provides around 300,000 jobs for local people, and the company slogan is "Creating city, driving economy"

== Utilities Groups ==
Amata Corporation PCL has set up nine companies to operate utility business as follows:

1. Amata B.Grimm Power Ltd. (changed from Amata Power Ltd., on 26 August 2011) in which the company holds a 13.77% interest. The company operates a power business that sells electricity and steam in Thailand and overseas.
2. Amata Water Co., Ltd., (name changed from Amata Quality Water Co., Ltd., on 21 November 2005) produces water products for industrial users. Amata Corp holds a 100% stake in this company.
3. Amata Natural Gas Distribution Co., Ltd., distributes natural gas to industrial users. Amata holds a 20% stake in this company.
4. Amata B-Grimm Power (Rayong) 1 Ltd., produces electricity and steam; Amata indirectly holds a 15.23% stake in this company.
5. Amata B. Grimm Power (Rayong) 2 Ltd., produces electricity and steam; Amata indirectly holds as 15.23% stake in this company.
6. Amata B. Grimm Power 3 Ltd., produces electricity and steam; Amata directly and indirectly holds an 18.26% stake in this company.
7. Amata B. Grimm Power 4 Ltd., produces electricity and steam; Amata directly and indirectly holds a 27% stake in this company.
8. Amata B. Grimm Power 5 Ltd., produces electricity and steam; Amata directly and indirectly holds a 27% stake in this company.
9. Amata B. Grimm Power 5 Ltd., produces electricity and steam; Amata directly and indirectly holds a 27% stake in this company.
10. Amata FredeErSej Ltd., provides guidance and consulting services in relation to the closing of deals; Amata directly and indirectly holds a 32% stake in this company.
