= Tai Entertainment =

Thai film company

Tai Entertainment Co., Ltd.
- Type: Limited company
- Industry: Film
- Founded: 1985
- Defunct: 2004
- Key people: Charan Poolworalak; Wisoot Poolworalak
- Products: Film media

Tai Entertainment (Thai: ไท เอ็นเตอร์เทนเมนท์ ) was a Thai film production and distribution company operating between 1985 to 2004. The company was managed by an uncle–nephew duo, Charan Poolworalak and Wisoot Poolworalak. It was a Thai film studio that revolutionized the industry by producing films that accurately captured the trends of the teenage target audience, with meticulous, modern, and distinctive production quality.

Its first film was Suum Noi Noi, Kalon Mak Noi and it went on to produce many other films, achieving great success in both revenue and awards from various institutions. The company later jointly managed operations with GMM Pictures and Hub Ho Hin, forming a new company under the name GMM Tai Hub (GTH) after collaborating on the film Fan Chan.

Eventually, they separated from the joint venture and announced the dissolution of GTH on November 13, 2005, effective from December 31, 2005, marking a total of 11 years operating under the GTH name. Subsequently, a new company was established in collaboration with Mono Technology in 2006 under the name TMoment, but operations did not go as planned and the company was closed in 2019. Later, a joint venture with Major Cineplex and M Pictures was formed to establish a new company under the name Tai Major in 2020.

== Key figures ==
=== Producers ===
- Charan Poolworalak
- Wisoot Poolworalak

=== Directors under the company ===
- Thanit Jitnukul
- Adirek Wattleela
- Udom Ariyaudomroj
- Somjing Srisuphap
- Nonzee Nimibutr
- Yongyoot Thongkongtoon
- Suthep Tannirat
- Chalat Sriwanna
- Manop Jenjarassakul
- Alongkot Auepaiboon
- Sompop Wechpipat

=== Notable actors under the company ===
- Billy Ogan
- Surasak Wongthai
- Penpisut
- Thatchai Palakul
- Supakorn Udomchai
- Janjira Joojaeng
- Khajornsak Rattananisai
- Saksit Tangthong
- Patipan Pathaveekan
- Jesdaporn Pholdee
- Chatchai Ngamsan
- Ananda Everingham
- Sahaphap Veeraghamin
- Chaicharn Nimpoolsawas
- Nattawiranuj Thongmee
- Phattharaphon Silpajarn

== Filmography ==
Title
Suum Noi Noi, Kalon Mak Noi (1985)
Pluem (1986)
Please Be Informed... I Miss You Very Much (1986)
Don’t Say You’re Sinful (1987)
Dee Taek (1987)
Rak Raek Um (1988)
Chalui (1988)
Prik Khee Nu Kap Moo Ham (1989)
Chalui Project 2 (1990)
Pukpui (1990)
Magic Moon (1991)
Keep Rolling, That’s What Dad Taught (1991)
Bun Tang Khai (1992)
To Laeo Tong To (1992)
My Wonder Year (1993)
Soulmates of Two Worlds (1994)
Egg Man (1994)
Magic Moon 2 (1995)
True Love: Chapter 1 (1995)
Fire & Ice (1996)
Dream Society (1997)
Dang Bireley’s and Young Gangsters (1997)
303 Fear Faith Revenge (1998)
Nang Nak (1999)
The Iron Ladies (2000)
Mae Bia (2001)
Jan Dara (2001)
Male Prisoner (2002)
Snooping on the Neighbor (2003 produced by Mahachai Film)
The Iron Ladies 2 (2003)
Soulmates: The Miracle (2003)
Fan Chan (2003) (co-produced with GMM Pictures and Hub Ho Hin, later merged into GMM Tai Hub)
Doctor Hurt (2004)

== See also ==
- GMM Tai Hub
- T Moment
- Tai Major
