= Fai Amata =

- Genre: Drama; Romantic
- Based on: Be a Better Man by Vikrom Kromadit
- Developed by: Sanlaya
- Starring: Shahkrit Yamnam; Sonia Couling; Nirut Sirijanya; Uthumphon Silaphan
- Country of origin: Thailand
- Original language: Thai
- No. of seasons: 1
- No. of episodes: 26

Production
- Producer: Philaiwan Bunlon
- Production locations: Bangkok; Kanchanaburi; Taiwan
- Running time: 60 minutes
- Production companies: JSL Global Media co., Ltd; Amata Foundation

Original release
- Network: MCOT
- Release: April 10 – July 4, 2010

Fai Amata (Thai: ไฟอมตะ; RTGS: Fai Amata; transl. Be a Better Man; transl. Eternal Flame) is a Thai drama television series. It aired on Saturday and Sunday nights on Channel 9 MCOT starting 10 Apr, 2010, starring Shahkrit Yamnam, Sonia Couling Vacharasinthu, Nirut Sirijanya and Uthumphon Silaphan.

The series is adapted from the autobiography Be a Better Man by Vikrom Kromadit, developed by Sanlaya, produced by JSL Global Media co., Ltd and Amata Foundation.

== Cast ==
=== Main cast ===
- Shahkrit Yamnam as Athit
- Sonia Couling Vacharasinthu as Kelly Yao
- Nirut Sirijanya as Thungfat; Athit's father
- Uthumphon Silaphan as Chia; Athit's mother

=== Supporting cast ===
- Somphop Benchathikun as Yao Papa; Kelly's father
- Dueantem Salitun as Yao Mama; Kelly's mother
- Phitsamai Wilaisak as Grandmom
- Saat Piamphongsan as Granddad
- Chalao Prasopsat as Grandmom
- Rong Khaomunkhadi as Uncle Yin
- Nat Phuwanai as Uncle Sen
- Daran Boonyasak as Nari; Athit's lover
- Sarocha Wathittaphan as India; Athit's sister
- Suphot Chancharoen as Ting; Athit's brother
- Athaphon Thimakon as Lan; Athit's brother
- Chalisa Bunkhrongtrap as Wiphawi
- Tin Chokkamonkit as Wibun; Athit's brother
- Chakrit Chatuphonwatthanaphon as Wiwat
- Chutima Thangsri as Nora
- Jamie Bouher as Somhathai
- Thanaphat Thitiphalathip as Fuk
- Naowarat Suesat as Benchamat
- Saithan Miyomkan as Siam
- Chanana Nutakom as Rattana
- Ranya Siyanon as Aet; Thungfat's second wife
- Wasitthi Srilofung as Ku
- Narin Na Bangchang as Hiang
- Kuensit Suwanwatthi as Tunyoen
- Thanom Samthon as Chenlei
- Haek Chuanchuen as Yom
- Wanwisa Damkham as Rabiap
- Phiphat Witthayapanyanon as Chittakon; Athit's best friend
- Sariya Atsawaloetphanit as Da Yi; Kelly's best friend
- Chonnasorn Sajakul as Kaiwei Yao; Kelly's sister
- Phuchisa Suphathanaphat as Piak
- Panwet Saiklai as Tai

== Awards ==
Year	Awards	Category	Nominee(s)	Result
2010	25th TV Gold Awards	Best TV Drama	JSL Global Media co., Ltd	Nominated
2010	25th TV Gold Awards	Best TV Script	Sanlaya	Won
2010	25th TV Gold Awards	Best Actor in a Lead Role	Shahkrit Yamnam	Nominated
2010	25th TV Gold Awards	Best Actor in a Supporting Role	Nirut Sirijanya	Nominated
2010	25th TV Gold Awards	Best Actress in a Supporting Role	Uthumphon Silaphan	Nominated
2010	2nd Nataraja Awards	Best TV Drama	JSL Global Media co., Ltd	Nominated
2010	2nd Nataraja Awards	Best Director	Philaiwan Bunlon	Nominated
2010	2nd Nataraja Awards	Best Actor in a Lead Role	Shahkrit Yamnam	Nominated
2010	2nd Nataraja Awards	Best Actor in a Supporting Role	Nirut Sirijanya	Nominated
2010	2nd Nataraja Awards	Best Actress in a Supporting Role	Uthumphon Silaphan	Nominated
2010	2nd Nataraja Awards	Best TV Script	Sanlaya	Nominated
2010	2nd Nataraja Awards	Best Original Soundtrack	Phaphasin Khitawongwat	Nominated
2010	2nd Nataraja Awards	Art Direction	Sarannon Phan-akat	Nominated
2011	4th NineEntertain Awards	Best Actor	Shahkrit Yamnam	Won
2011	4th NineEntertain Awards	Best TV Drama	JSL Global Media co., Ltd	Won
2011	Asian Television Awards 2011	Best Actor in a Supporting Role	Nirut Sirijanya	Nominated

== Trivia ==
- Based on true story of the book Be a Better Man, the autobiography of Vikrom Kromadit, a Thai businessman and writer. He is the founder and chief executive officer of Amata Corporation PCL. The book has sold over 1.6 million copies in Thailand, and is being translated into different languages.
- Athit is form Vikrom Kromadit and Kelly Yao is form Kelly Yao, his first wife.
- This is the second time Shahkrit Yamnam and Sonia Couling have worked together.
- The first Thai television series of Sorn CLC
- filmed at Bopiliao Historic Block in Taipei, National Taiwan University, Yangming Mountain, Tamsui, Chien Mu's residence, Hsinchu High School, among others.
