= The Challenger Muay Thai =

2011 Singaporean TV series

- The Challenger Muay Thai
- Created by: Riaz Mehta
- Presented by: Stephan Fox; Sonia Couling
- Country of origin: Singapore
- Original language: English
- No. of episodes: 13

Production
- Executive producers: Riaz Mehta; David M. Knox; Joel Lin; Eric Van Wagenen; Sam Gollestani
- Running time: 45

Original release
- Network: AXN
- Release: September 15 – December 9, 2011

The Challenger Muay Thai is a reality-based television series, nominated for the International Emmy Award for Best Non-Scripted Entertainment in 2012, that follows 16 aspiring Muay Thai middleweight fighters, from around the world, as they compete in a series of outdoor challenges and sanctioned matches held in Malaysia.

Each week, the fighters are trained by Hanarong and Nugget McNaught. Every match consists of five rounds, each lasting between five and 15 minutes.

The winner receives US$100,000 and bragging rights as "The Challenger Muay Thai Champion".

The Challenger Muaythai was shown on AXN, Prime Time, every Thursday, created by Riaz Mehta and produced by Imagine Group and The Group Entertainment, under sanctioning of the World Muaythai Council (WMC), the world's governing body for the sport of muaythai.

== Contestants ==
Contestants	Nickname	Nationality	Birthdate	Height (cm)/Weight (kg)
Antoine Pinto	"The Phenom"	French/Thai	16/02/1991	183/67
Cedric Muller	"Underground Samurai"	French	13/09/1975	177/71
Cyrus Washington	"Black Dynamite"	American	10/28/1983	177/76
Fadi Merza	"The Beast"	Austrian	08/03/1978	180/72
Frank Giorgi	"The Italian Stallion"	Italian	22/01/1981	176/72.5
Ilya Grad	"Archilles"	Israeli	22/06/1987	192/75
Jason Woodham	"The Handsome Hero"	British	29/02/1984	182/72
Jesse Miles Lacombe	"Smiles"	Canadian	03/05/1983	175/75
Jordan Watson	"Quadzilla"	British	04/12/1987	175/71
Marco Pique	"The Sniper"	Dutch	09/01/1980	182/72
Mostafa Abdollahi	"Persian Mos"	Iranian	23/11/1982	180/72.5
Pidsanu Kunchat	"Mardsua"	Thai	10/05/1986	175/72.5
Michael Chase Corley	"Cool Hand"	American	07/12/1984	183/72
Mohd Faizal Bin Ramli	"Golden Elbow"	Malaysian	24/10/1989	177/69
Rhyse Saliba	"Poison Dart"	Australian	06/07/1992	178/73
Vuyisile Colossa	"The Cheetah"	South African	28/06/1982	178/73

== Episode summary ==
=== Episode 1 ===
Original airdate: September 15, 2011
The contestants, are introduced and brought to their living quarters in Kuala Lumpur, Malaysia where they would be staying during the course of the competition. During the first training session, the fighters are introduced to the "Weapon Of The Week". The "Weapon Of The Week" is a training based excursus to decide the fight of the week.

Corey puts up a strong fight, but Colossa's kicks and punches prove too much for Michael. In the third round, a hard kick to Michael's thigh led to a knockout.

- Weapon Of The Week: Conditioning, relating to the fighter's stamina and fitness
- Challenge winner: Vuyisile Colossa
- Match: Vuyisile Colossa VS Michael Chase Corey
- Match winner: Vuyisile Colossa
- Eliminated: Michael Chase Corey

=== Episode 2 ===
Original airdate: September 22, 2011
The "Weapon Of The Week" is revealed to be punching, where Muller and Fadi expressed keen interest in fighting this week. During deliberation, Muller was chosen as the strongest puncher. However, upon Muller's entrance into the ring, Stephan Fox commented that he sees Fadi as the superior puncher.

After 5 long, hard fought rounds of intense Muaythai action, Muller emerges victorious.

Colossa, for his outstanding win, enjoys an evening at Bila Bila restaurant at Sepang Golf Coast Resort.

- Weapon Of The Week: Punching
- Challenge winner: Cedric Muller
- Match: Cedric Muller VS Fadi Merza
- Match winner: Cedric Muller
- Eliminated: Fadi Merza

=== Episode 3 ===
Original airdate: September 29, 2011
The "Weapon Of The Week" is the powerful and deadly weapon, the knee, which when executed well has the power to weaken and even cripple opponents. All 12 fighters seem eager and determined to show off their skills. After deliberation, Antoine was chosen as having the best knee within the villa. This was disagreed by the trainers, who prefer Ilya.

After 3 rounds, Antoine's die-hard performance secured him a position in the second round.

Muller, for his previous win, was excused from the daily training session to get rest to recuperate.

- Weapon Of The Week: Knee
- Challenge winner: Pinto Antoine
- Match: Pinto Antoine VS Ilya Grad
- Match winner: Pinto Antoine
- Eliminated: Ilya Grad

=== Episode 4 ===
Original airdate: October 6, 2011
The "Weapon Of The Week" is kicking. During the training session, Cyrus shows displeasure towards the training methods and decides not to take part in the rest of the training. As for the other fighters, after showcasing their kicks, there was a consensus that Kunchat was the strongest kicker. As Kunchat was chosen both by the fighters as well as the trainers, he had the power to choose his opponent. Rhyse was selected.

At the end of the five rounds, Kunchat came out on top with his beautiful Muaythai technique.

Muller and Antoine, both representing France and having won consecutively, was excused from training and enjoyed an evening at the Sepang Gold Coast beach.

- Weapon Of The Week: Kicking
- Challenge winner: Pidsanu Kunchat
- Match: Pidsanu Kunchat VS Rhyse Saliba
- Match winner: Pidsanu Kunchat
- Eliminated: Rhyse Saliba

=== Episode 5 ===
Original airdate:October 13, 2011
The "Weapon Of The Week" is elbows. A quick decision was made during deliberation, that Faizal (i.e. "Golden Elbow") was the strongest contestant, and was agreed by both fighters and trainers. He chose Jesse as his opponent. It was tough for Jesse to begin with, as in order for him not to be qualified, he had to first lose four kilos.

In the end at the fifth round, Faizal's relentless attitude earns him a victory for his country, Malaysia.

Antoine celebrates his win by spending the evening t the digital city, I-City.

- Weapon Of The Week: Elbow
- Challenge winner: Mohd Faizal Bin Ramli
- Match: Mohd Faizal Bin Ramli VS Jesse Miles Lacombe
- Match winner: Mohd Faizal Bin Ramli
- Eliminated: Jesse Miles Lacombe

=== Episode 6 ===
Original airdate: October 20, 2011
The "Weapon Of The Week" is clinching. Fighters who have yet to fight in the first round do their utmost to display their best clinching styles. At the time of decision, both the fighters and trainers choose Mosi. The surprise came when Mosi selected Jason as his opponent, when Mosi and Jason shared a strong friendship and pledged that they would never select each other.

After 2 rounds, Mosi knocks Jason out flat, and emerges victorious.

Stephan congratulates Faizal on his win, and gives him an afternoon to enjoy a small aircraft ride around the state of Selangor, Malaysia.

- Weapon Of The Week: Clinching
- Challenge winner: Mostafa Abdollahi
- Match: Mostafa Abdollahi VS Jason Woodham
- Match winner: Mostafa Abdollahi
- Eliminated: Jason Woodham

=== Episode 7 ===
Original airdate: October 27, 2011
The "Weapon Of The Week" is combinations. It was also revealed that the last two fights in the first round would be a double-header. During deliberation, the fighters were torn between Jordan and Marco who they felt had the best combination. At the end, the fighters voted for Jordan, which was also the choice of the trainers. Jordan selected Cyrus as his opponent, which left Marco and Frank as the last fight in the first round.

Jordan and Cyrus were both fighters at the same level. At the end, Jordan won unanimously by points and sent Cyrus home.

The case was the same for Marco and Frank, where the fight was neck and neck. After the fifth and final round, Marco won on points.

Mosi was greeted by his wife, as a surprise reward from Stephan for his win the previous week. The two spent the day out enjoying each other's company.

- Weapon Of The Week: Combinations
- Challenge winner: Jordan Watson
- Match: Jordan Watson VS Cyrus Washington
- Match winner: Jordan Watson
- Eliminated: Cyrus Washington
- Match: Marco Pique VS Frank Giorgi
- Match winner: Marco Pique
- Eliminated: Frank Giorgi

=== Episode 8 ===
Original airdate: November 4, 2011
With the double elimination of Cyrus and Frank in the previous week, 8 fighters still remain in the second round of the competition. They were then split into two teams, selected by their trainers Nong and Nugget.

Blue Team: Jordan, Kunchat, Faizal and Mosi
Red Team: Colossa, Marco, Antoine and Muller

At the matchup deliberation, Faizal was nominated to represent the Blue team, and Antoine for the Red team. The fifth round was the decisive round, which allowed Antoine to emerge victorious despite having lost on points up until then.

- Match: Mohd Faizal Bin Ramli VS Pinto Antoine
- Match winner: Pinto Antoine
- Eliminated: Mohd Faizal Bin Ramli

=== Episode 9 ===
Original airdate: November 11, 2011
Antoine's name is the first to be placed under the semi-finals column. Stephan revealed that the winner of the week's fight would be facing Antoine in the first semi-finals match.

After training, at deliberation, the Blue team chose Kunchat, whereas the Red team nominated Colossa to represent the teams respectively. Both fighters put up an unrelenting fight. It was at the end of five rounds that the judges decided that the victory should go to Kunchat.

- Match: Pidsanu Kunchat VS Vuyisile Colossa
- Match winner: Pidsanu Kunchat
- Eliminated: Vuyisile Colossa

=== Episode 10 ===
Original airdate: November 18, 2011
It is revealed during the gym session that the next matchup decision would set the final matchup, as there were only 2 fights and 4 fighters remaining in the quarterfinals.

The 3rd quarterfinal match is set to be Cedric versus Jordan. Both fighters started cautiously, until the end of the first round when Jordan swept Cedric off his feet with a swift low kick. With every round, Jordan executed his offense and defense perfectly, thus securing victory.

- Match: Jordan Watson VS Cedric Muller
- Match winner: Jordan Watson
- Eliminated: Cedric Muller

=== Episode 11 ===
Original airdate: November 25, 2011
As the match this week was decided due to last week's match up, Marco was concerned about his fighting ability due to the injury sustained at his shin. Midway during the match, Marco seemed to aggravate his previous injury further, but continued finishing the fight. In the end, Mosi claimed victory by judges' decision.

- Match: Mostafa Abdollahi VS Marco Pique
- Match winner: Mostafa Abdollahi
- Eliminated: Marco Pique

== Award ==
- Nomination of the International Emmy Award for Best of Non-scripted Entertainment
