= The Real Housewives of Bangkok =

Thai reality television series

- Genre: Reality
- Based on: The Real Housewives
- Country of origin: Thailand

Production
- Production location: Bangkok
- Camera setup: Multiple
- Running time: 60 minutes
- Production company: Kantana Group

The Real Housewives of Bangkok was initially an upcoming Thai reality television series. It was originally supposed to be produced by Kantana Group in partnership with NBC Universal International Studios. The Real Housewives of Bangkok was to focus on the personal and professional lives of several women living in Bangkok, Thailand.

== Overview and casting ==
On 8 December 2016, it was announced that NBCUniversal International Formats had signed a deal, brokered by Linfield Ng, with production company Kantana Group to produce the first Asian installment of The Real Housewives franchise, set in Bangkok. Yvonne Pilkington, senior vice president at NBCUniversal International Formats, described the franchise as a television phenomenon that has extended across the globe, and The Real Housewives of Bangkok would serve as the first installment in the franchise to be based in Asia. Pilkington describe the series as a fascinating chance to see culturally contrasting nature of the production and the housewives. The production company has gone on to express their excitement in the partnership with NBC Universal and their willingness to create a successful series as well as describing the franchise as highly successful. The series will consist of a total thirteen episodes. The cast will be revealed in the winter of 2023 and season 1 is set to premiere in late 2023 or early 2024.

In 2023, it was revealed that the show was scrapped after several years of casting and filming issues taking place.
