= Kon Khon =

- Film poster
- Directed by: Sarunyoo Wongkrachang
- Written by: Sarunyoo Wongkrachang
- Starring: Apinya Rungpitakmana; Nantarat Chaowarat; Nirut Sirijanya; Sorapong Chatree; Penpak Sirikul
- Music by: Ratchasak Rueangchai; Chesata Sukkhathramon; Chaiyoot Tosa-nga
- Production company: Nub Nueng Neo Film
- Distributed by: Sahamongkol Film International
- Release date: 25 August 2011
- Running time: 90 minutes
- Country: Thailand
- Language: Thai

Kon Khon (Thai: คนโขน) is a 2011 Thai drama film by Sarunyoo Wongkrachang. It concerns a love triangle involving three rival Khon dancers. The film was selected as the Thai entry for the Best Foreign Language Film at the 84th Academy Awards, but it did not make the final shortlist.

== Plot ==
An orphan, Chart, raised by his master after his parents' death and trained be to be a Khon dancer, becomes involved with the dance teacher Rambai.

== Cast ==
- Apinya Rungpitakmana as Chart
- Gongtun Pongpatna as Tue
- Nantarat Chaowarat as Ram
- Pimolrat Pisolyabutr as Rambai
- Nirut Sirijanya as Sek
- Sorapong Chatree as Yot
- Penpak Sirikul as Sonklin

== See also ==
- List of submissions to the 84th Academy Awards for Best Foreign Language Film
- List of Thai submissions for the Academy Award for Best Foreign Language Film
