= Destiny Upside Down =

Destiny Upside Down (คนป่วนสายฟ้า)
- Directed by: Udom Udomroj
- Written by: Udom Udomroj
- Produced by: Udom Udomroj
- Starring: Shahkrit Yamnam; Jessadaporn Pholdee; Sonia Couling; Billy Ogan
- Distributed by: Five Star Production
- Release date: 26 December 1997
- Running time: 97 min
- Country: Thailand
- Language: Thai

Destiny Upside Down (Thai: คนป่วนสายฟ้า; RTGS: khon puan sai fa) is a 1998 film, starred Shahkrit Yamnam, Jessadaporn Pholdee and Sonia Couling.

== Plot ==
The story of two young men, “Itthiphon” and “Thaenkhun”. Their destinies were set to be born on the same day and almost at the same time. Both were raised and grew up in a totally different ways:

“Thaenkhun” with affection and warmth, while “Itthiphon” was spoiled by money. Somehow, “Itthiphon” manages to be successful whatever he does, and when Tan is transferred to the same school, both of their lives are to be dramatically changed.

== Cast ==
- Shahkrit Yamnam as Itthiphon
- Jessadaporn Pholdee as Thaenkhun
- Sonia Couling as Chik
- Billy Ogan as Piam
- Watchara Paniam as Producer
- Krit Sukramongkhon as Banthat
- Lek Isun as Itthiphon's father
- Khathariya Kanchanarot as Itthiphon's mother
- Chayut Burakamkowit as Kanchit
- Wichai Chongprasitphon as Maeo

== Awards and nominations ==
- Thailand National Film Association Awards - Best Supporting Actor Billy Ogan
- Cinemag Spirit Awards 2 - Best Supporting Actor Billy Ogan
