= Tea Box =

2021 Thai TV mini-series

- Genre: Drama; Comedy
- Written by: Rattapong Pinyosophon; Nanfah Likitpanyachot
- Directed by: Virada Khuhawan
- Starring: Nirut Sirichanya; Sutthirak Subvijitra; Chakrit Yamnam; Latkamon Pinrojkirati; Jittapat Worakitphiphat; Hassaya Isariyasereekul
- Country of origin: Thailand
- Original language: Thai
- No. of seasons: 1
- No. of episodes: 4

Production
- Producers: Suwikrom Amaranon; Pisut Mahapun
- Cinematography: Sitiporn Klinbua
- Running time: Saturdays and Sundays at 08:15 pm (ICT)
- Production companies: Black Dot Co., Ltd.

Original release
- Network: Thai PBS; LINE TV (repeats)
- Release: January 23 – January 31, 2021

Tea Box (stylized as TEA BOX, Thai: ชายชรากับหมาบ้า, literally: "the old man and the mad dog") is a 2021 Thai TV mini-series aired on Thai PBS and LINE TV starred by Nirut Sirichanya, Chakrit Yamnam, Sutthirak Subvijitra.

The story is about an old man who is desperate for life, and a young man searching for a purpose in life.

== Synopsis ==
JJ had just been terminated by his girlfriend. The couple quarrel so loudly that Vichai the old next door that lives without purpose upset with annoyance. The event becomes even harder, when Vichai saw JJ secretly stole his mango until it reached the police station.

Police mediate JJ to water the plants for Vichai every day as a punishment. The beginning of friendship of different ages was born.

== Cast ==
- Nirut Sirichanya as Vichai, an ailing old man who used to be skilled chief engineer
  - Chakrit Yamnam as youth Vichai
- Sutthirak Subvijitra as JJ, a young unemployed man at the age of 26
- Latkamon Pinrojkirati as Fern, JJ's girlfriend
- Jittapat Worakitphiphat as Nittaya (Nit), Vichai's late wife
  - Hassaya Isariyasereekul as youth Nittaya

== Release ==
Tea Box aired on Saturday and Sunday nights from 08:15 pm – 09:10 pm on Thai PBS and LINE TV starting January 23, ending January 31 for 4 episodes in 2021.

It reruns at the original time from April 16 – 17 and April 23 – 24, 2022 on Thai PBS.

== Accolades ==
Award	Subject	Nominee	Result
18th Kom Chad Luek Awards	Best Social Creative Drama/Series	Tea Box	Won
26th Asian Television Awards	Best Actor in a Leading Role	Nirut Sirichanya	Nominated
