= Chalui =

1988 Thai film

- Directed by: Adirek Wattleela
- Written by: Adirek Wattleela
- Starring: Billy Ogan; Surasak Wongthai
- Cinematography: Panya Nimchareonpong
- Edited by: Adirek Wattleela
- Music by: Butterfly
- Distributed by: Tai Entertainment
- Release date: 18 June 1988
- Country: Thailand
- Language: Thai
- Budget: 2.1 million baht
- Box office: 12 million baht

Chalui (Thai: ฉลุย) is a 1988 Thai film directed by Adirek Watleela and starred by Bily Ogan and Surasak Wongthai. The film earned about 12 million baht and won an award in the 33rd Asia-Pacific Film Festival for film editing.

== Plot ==
The story of Pong and Tong, two young men who leave their rural home to come to the city with the dream of becoming famous singers. However, the path is neither smooth nor glamorous. Not only do they struggle to find a way to become singers, but they barely have enough money to live day by day. They must rely on their determination, patience, and perseverance to reach their dreams. They fight and struggle, turning their lives around in every way to survive, live well, and maintain hope. Fortunately, they have a beautiful neighbor, Tukta, and their aunt, Vi, who help them, offer advice, and always encourage them.

== Cast ==
- Billy Ogan as Pong
- Surasak Wongthai as Tong
- Yanee Jongwisut as Vi
- Radchanok Saeng-Chuto as Tukta

== Legacy ==
The 2015 film Tae Khob Fah Chalui was titled in reference to the film.
