= Shahkrit Yamnam =

Thai actor

- ชาคริต แย้มนาม
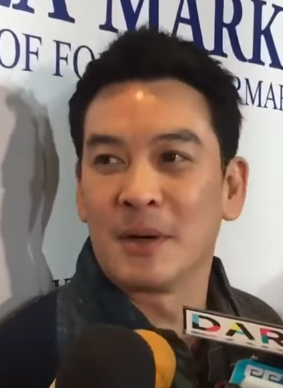
- Yamnam in 2019
- Born: 25 June 1978 (age 48); Bangkok, Thailand
- Education: BA Chartered Institute of Marketing, International Correspondence School (ICS), USA
- Occupations: Actor; YouTuber; MC
- Years active: 1998–present
- Known for: Bangkok Dangerous (2008); February (2003); A Moment in June (2008); Iron Chef Thailand (2012–2017)
- Height: 1.77 m (5 ft 9 1/2 in)
- Spouses: Virithipa Phakdeeprasong (m. 2012; div. 2016) Pattira Rungroj (m. 2017)

Shahkrit Yamnam (Thai: ชาคริต แย้มนาม; RTGS: Cha-khrit Yaemnam; born 25 June 1978 in Bangkok, Thailand) is a Thai film and television actor. He has acted in numerous popular lakorns, sitcoms and commercials. He is also credited under the stage names Shahkrit Yamnarm, Charkrit Ngamengarm and Krit.

== Biography ==
He was born in Bangkok, Thailand, started his preschool education at Peterpan School, moved to Bangkok International Preparatory School and studied there until Grade 9 before studying abroad in New Zealand for 3 years, and later in the US where he earned his undergraduate or bachelor's degree education at International Correspondence School (ICS), USA. There, he majored in Marketing.

Chakrit's first appearances were fashion pictures in Angel and Thoe Kub Chan magazine in the 90s. He has hosted television programs such as TeenTalk and e for teens, as well as singing on the album Teentrax, making the song "ไม่รู้จะเลือกใคร" highly popular at the time. He was cast in many high-rated lakorns, television series, movies, and sitcoms.

His films include Destiny Upside Down (1997) with Jesdaporn Pholdee and Sonia Couling, O-Negative (1998) with Tata Young, directed by Yuthlert Sippapak. In addition, Chakrit has starred in international films, including Belly of the Beast with Steven Seagal and Bangkok Dangerous with Nicolas Cage.

He is well-known 'foodie critic', he is also a host on the cooking show Krua Laew Tae Krit, Thai-Korean cooking show The Team Chef and was a host of Iron Chef Thailand.

== Filmography ==
Year	English Title	Thai Title	Role	Notes	With
1997	Anda Kap Fasai	อันดากับฟ้าใส		Supporting Role	
1997	Destiny Upside Down	คนป่วนสายฟ้า	Itthiphon	Lead Role	Sonia Couling
1998	O-Negative	รัก-ออกแบบไม่ได้	Puen	Lead Role	Tata Young
2003	February	กุมภาพันธ์	Chiradet	Lead Role	Sophitnapha Chumphani
2003	Belly of the Beast		Brice	Supporting Role	
2003	Bangkok China Town	เยาวราช		Lead Role	Darawan Wilaingam
2004	Bicycles & Radios (Short)		Nop	Lead Role	Siriyakorn Pukkavesh
2007	Opapatika	โอปปาติก เกิดอมตะ	Pison	Lead Role	Khemupsorn Sirisukha
2008	Valentine	คริตกะจ๋า บ้าสุดสุด	Kengkat	Lead Role	Natthaweeranuch Thongmee
2008	Bangkok Dangerous	ฮีโร่ เพชฌฆาต ล่าข้ามโลก	Kong	Lead Role	
2008	4 Romance	ฝัน หวาน อาย จูบ	Chen	Lead Role	Suttida Kasemsant Na Ayutthaya Apinya Sakuljaroensuk
2009	A Moment in June	ณ ขณะรัก			
2009	My Ex	แฟนเก่า		Lead Role	Wanida Toemthanapon
2010	My Best Bodyguard	มาย เบสท์ บอดี้การ์ด		Lead Role	
2010	Lunlla Man	ผู้ชายลัลล้า		Lead Role	
2011	Boy s tenyu 3. Posledniy raund		Jolo	Supporting Role	
2012	Lunlla Man 2	ลัลล้า ยกกำลังสอง	Thaen	Lead Role	
2012	3 A.M. 3D (segment "O. T")	ตีสาม 3D	Karan	Lead Role	
2014	4 Kings	สีเรียงเซียนโต๊ด	Tot	Lead Role	
2014	O.T. The Movie	O.T ผี overtime	Karan	Lead Role	
2015	Mae Bia	แม่เบี้ย	Chanachon	Lead Role	Karnpitchar Ketmanee
2016	Luk Thung Signature	ลูกทุ่งซิกเนอเจอร์		Guest Role	
2017	Memories of New Years	คิดถึงทุกปี		Lead Role	Barbie Piyamarth
2026	Confessions of a Shaman	คำสารภาพของหมอผี	Tian	Lead Role	

== Television ==
Year	Title	Role	With	Network
1997	Tayad Khunying		Sunisa Shukbhunsong	Channel 5
1999	Chai Nai Fan		Kejmanee Wantanasin	Channel 5
1999	Peon Rang Bon Tang Rak	Pai	Inthira Dangjumrud	Channel 7
2000	Pleng Pee Bok	Thanathorn / Thaen	Chalita Fuangarom	Channel 5
2000	City of Delusion	Gun Yuthnan	Kathaleeya McIntosh	Channel 5
2001	Rerng Maya	Mek	Sueangsuda Lawanprasert	Channel 7
2001	Chai Khub Pom Paen Chai	Napat	Metinee Kingpayom	Channel 5
2001	Roen Nob Kao	Maeth	Pornchita Na Songkla	Channel 3
2001	Lai Manud	Sila	Pornchita Na Songkla	Channel 3
2002	Buang Baja Thorn	Lao Peurng	Marsha Wattanapanich	Channel 7
2002	Last Will	Krit Phet	Kedmanee Wantanasin	Channel 5
2002	Jom Jai Jom Kean	Nawin	Sunisa Jett	Channel 3
2003	Little Cupid	Theedeth / "Deth"	Pachrapa Chaichua	Channel 7
2003	Phu Sang Dow	Praphan / "Phan"	Janie Tienphosuwan	Channel 3
2004	Bow See Chompoo	Poan	Angy Hesting	Channel 3
2004	See Pandin	Aon	Siriyakorn Pukkavesh	Channel 9
2004	Pleng Fah Rom Dow	Pichard	Woranuch Bhirombhakdi	Channel 7
2004	Fai See Ngen	Wit / "V"	Bussakorn Pornpannasirivej	Channel 7
2005	Lei Rai Obai Rak	Tohrai	Katreeya English	Channel 7
2005	Somepao Thong	Thung	Rinlanee Sripen	Channel 3
2005	Viman Shai	Panin Nirapai	Namthip Jongrachatawiboon	Channel 3
2005	Kulap See Dam	Worathep	Lalita Panyopas	Channel 3
2006	Vairai Yod Rak	Rong Soraya	Yardthip Rajpal	Channel 3
2006	Khun Nai Sailap	Sinthop	Myria Benedetti	Channel 5
2006	Kadee Det Het Heang Ruk	Navee	Savika Chaiyadej	Channel 7
2006	ผู้พิทักษ์รักเธอ (Phu Pi-Tak Rak Ther)	Bo	Akhamsiri Suwannasuk	Channel 5
2006	กลรักเกมพยาบาท (Kon Rak Game Phaya Bhat)	Panin	Suvanant Kongying	Channel 7
2006	เรือนรักเรือนทาส (Rean Rak Rean Tas)	Phat	Sirilak Pongchok	Channel 3
2007	แสงสูรย์ (Sang Soon)	Tong / Toi	Namthip Jongrachatawiboon	Channel 5
2007	มาเฟียที่รัก (Mafia Ti Rak)	Peter Chen / Chen Ling	Napapa Tantrakul	Channel 3
2009	คุณแม่จำแลง (Kun Mea Cham Lang)	Tanwa	Tanyaret Ramnarong	Channel 3
2009	Sapai Glai Peun Tiang	Jormtup	Ann Thongprasom	Channel 3
2009	ดิน น้ำ ลม ไฟ (Din Nam Lom Fai)	"Fai" / Akhee	Jittapa Jampratom	Channel 3
2009	จำเลยกามเทพ (Cham Lei Kamma Thap)	Mek	Khemupsorn Sirisukha	Channel 3
2010	Rong Raem Pee	Luang Narueban Bureerak	Cheeranat Yusanon	Channel 5
2010	Neur Mek	Payu	Khemupsorn Sirisukha	Channel 3
2010	Fai Amata (Eternal Flame)	Athit	Sonia Couling	Channel 9
2011	Talad Arom	Thrat	Wannarot Sonthichai	Channel 5
2011	Koo Kane Saen Ruk	Songkran Thanakul	Patcharapa Chaichua	Channel 7
2011	Mam Gaem Daeng	Nadol	Peeranee Kongthai	Channel 3
2012	Mae Yaai Tee Rak	Wanrob / Wanrop	Ranida Techasit	Channel 3
2012	Club Friday The Series		Namthip Jongrachatawiboon	GMM One
2013	Mon Jun Tra	Zama	Rasri Balenciaga	Channel 3
2014	Naruk	Nai	Kaneungnij Jaksamittanon	Channel 5
2014	Sai See Plerng	Charles / "Chan"	Araya A. Hargate & Nittha Jirayungyurn	Channel 3
2015	Chet Wan Chong Wen	San	Natthaweeranuch Thongmee	Workpoint TV
2016	Bussaba Rae Fun	Rangsit	Rasri Balenciaga, Malinee Adelaide Coates	Channel 3
2017	Duen Pradub Dao	Kanlong	Ranida Techasit	Channel 3
2018	Khu Si Phi Mue Prap	Siam	Kaneungnij Jaksamittanon	Workpoint TV
2018	Muang Maya Live The Series: Maya Ruk On Lie	Win Thawin	Chutimon Chuengcharoensukying	One 31
2018	Diamond Eyes: The Series	Petch Phumthai	Natthida Trichaiya	Mono 29
2018	Matuphoom Haeng Huachai	General Dr. Thun-Ou	Sonia Couling	Channel 3
2019	Sleepless Society: Bedtime Wishes	Rain / Rome	Sawika Chaiyadech	One 31
2021	Tea Box	Vichai (youth)	Hassaya Isariyasereekul	Thai PBS; LINE TV
2025	Ossan's LoveThailand	Kongdech Attasethakul	Pirapat Watthanasetsiri Sahaphap Wongratch	GMM 25

== Weekly Syndication ==
Year	Name	Role	Station
2004	เป็นต่อ (Pen Tor)	Pentor	Channel 3
2010	ครัวแล้วแต่คริต (Kitchen Show)	Host / Chef	Channel 3
2018	The Team Chef	Host	One

=== Master of Ceremony: MC ON TV ===
Year	Thai title	Title	Network	Notes	With
2019–present	เมนูบักโพธิ์		YouTuber:บักโพธิ์ Channel		
2020–present	คริต-อิน-สวน		YouTuber:บักโพธิ์ Channel		
2021–present	รสชาติไทย		7HD35		

== Awards ==
Year	Awards	Category	Title	Result
1997	National Film Association Award	Best Actor	Destiny Upside Down	Nominated
1998	National Film Association Award	Best Actor	O-Negative	Nominated
2004	National Film Association Award	Best Actor	February	Nominated
2010	National Film Association Award	Best Actor	A Moment in June	Nominated
2010	25th TV Gold Awards	Best Actor in a Lead Role	Fai Amata	Nominated
2010	2nd Nataraja Awards	Best Actor in a Lead Role	Fai Amata	Nominated
2011	4th NineEntertain Awards	Best Actor	Fai Amata, Rong Raem Pee, Neur Mek, My Best Bodyguard	Won
