= Thailand's Next Top Model =

- Promotional photograph of the cast
- Genre: Competition
- Created by: Tyra Banks
- Presented by: Sonia Couling
- Judges: Sonia Couling; Rungnapa Kern; O Sira
- Country of origin: Thailand
- Original language: Thai
- No. of seasons: 1
- No. of episodes: 26

Production
- Executive producer: Sonia Couling
- Running time: 60 minutes (30 minutes/day)

Original release
- Network: ThaiTV 3
- Release: May 18 – August 28, 2005

Related
- America's Next Top Model

Thailand's Next Top Model is a Thai reality television show based on America's Next Top Model that aired in 2005. The show was hosted by Thai supermodel Sonia Couling. The show's only season aired on ThaiTV 3 every Wednesday and Thursday at 21.50-22.00. It began airing on 18 May 2005 and ended on 28 August 2005.

Week by week one of the girls is eliminated until only one remains and is crowned Thailand's Next Top Model. The prize for winning Thailand's Next Top Model included a contract with Elite Model Management in Bangkok, a brand new Toyota car and a cash prize of ฿500.000. It was won by You Kheawchaum from Samut Songkhram.

== Overview ==
The show takes 500 applicants from around the country and selects 13 final participants, who then have to live together for 13 weeks.

Every week, another girl is eliminated through a series of photo shoots. In episodes 9 and 10, the top 5 girls took a trip to Tokyo, Japan. In the last episode, the last two girls compete to be the winner of the competition.

== Cycles ==
Cycle	Premiere date	Winner	Runner-up	Other contestants in order of elimination	Number of contestants	International Destinations
1	18 May 2005	You Kheawchaum	May Sootpa	Yok Boonchuay, Numfon Dalhek, Ann Christodurachris, Jha Phuenghan, Tai Watmeuang, Lukkade Piampiboon, Gib Teerawasutkul, Apple Karachoth, Ratee Ngarmniyom, Luktarn Puagkong, Nok Pomanee	13	Tokyo

== Episode summaries ==
=== Episodes 1-2 ===
Original airdate: May 18–19, 2005

- First call-out: Luktarn Puagkong
- Bottom two: Yok Boonchuay & Numfon Dalhek
- Eliminated: Yok Boonchuay

=== Episodes 3-4 ===
Original airdate: May 25–26, 2005

- First call-out: Ann Christodurachris
- Bottom two: Numfon Dalhek & Lukkade Piampiboon
- Eliminated: Numfon Dalhek

=== Episodes 5-6 ===
Original airdate: June 1–2, 2005

- First call-out: Gib Teerawisutkul
- Bottom two: Jha Phuenghan & Ann Christodurachris
- Eliminated: Ann Christodurachris

=== Episodes 7-8 ===
Original airdate: June 8–9, 2005

- First call-out: Nok Pomanee
- Bottom two: Lukkade Piampiboon & Jha Phuenghan
- Eliminated: Jha Phuenghan

=== Episodes 9-10 ===
Original airdate: June 15–16, 2005

- First call-out: May Sootpa
- Bottom two: Tai Watmeuang & Nok Pomanee
- Eliminated: Tai Watmeuang

=== Episodes 11-12 ===
Original airdate: June 22–23, 2005

- First call-out: Ratee Ngarmniyom
- Bottom two: Luktarn Puagkong & Lukkade Piampiboon
- Eliminated: Lukkade Piampiboon

=== Episodes 13-14 ===
Original airdate: June 29–30, 2005

- First call-out: You Kheawchaum
- Bottom two: Gib Teerawisutkul & Apple Karachoth
- Eliminated: Gib Teerawisutkul

=== Episodes 15-16 ===
Original airdate: July 6–7, 2005

- First call-out: Nok Pomanee
- Bottom two: Luktarn Puagkong & Apple Karachoth
- Eliminated: Apple Karachoth

=== Episodes 17-18 ===
Original airdate: July 13–14, 2005

- First call-out: You Kheawchaum
- Bottom two: Nok Pomanee & Ratee Ngarmniyom
- Eliminated: Ratee Ngarmniyom

=== Episodes 19-20 ===
Original airdate: July 20–21, 2005

- First call-out: May Sootpa
- Bottom two: Nok Pomanee & Luktarn Puagkong
- Eliminated: Luktarn Puagkong

=== Episodes 21-22 ===
Original airdate: July 27–28, 2005

Recap episode.

=== Episodes 23-24 ===
Original airdate: August 10–11, 2005

- First call-out: May Sootpa
- Bottom two: You Kheawchaum & Nok Pomanee
- Eliminated: Nok Pomanee

=== Episodes 25-26 ===
Original airdate: August 17–18, 2005

- Final Two: May Sootpa & You Kheawchaum

In this episode, the competition ended, but the winner was announced on August 28, 2005.

=== Special episode ===
Original airdate: August 28, 2005

This episode was reunion and talk show of contestants. Sanl Itthisukkhanan was moderator this show. Ann can't go to the reunion because she had a mission in the Miss Thailand World 2005 pageant at Si Racha, but she had connected in a VTR live from her to greet all the contestants. And then, the show had been cut when Sonia Couling announced the winner in episode 13. You was the winner.

- Thailand's Next Top Model: You Kheawchaum

== Contestants ==
(ages stated are at start of contest)

Contestant	Age	Hometown	Height	Outcome
Yok Boonchuay	22	Uttaradit	1.69 m (5 ft 6 1/2 in)	Eliminated in Episode 1
Numfon Dalhek	24	Ubon Ratchathani	1.75 m (5 ft 9 in)	Eliminated in Episode 2
Ann Christodurachris	18	Bangkok	1.71 m (5 ft 7 1/2 in)	Eliminated in Episode 3
Jha Phuenghan	21	Khon Kaen	1.71 m (5 ft 7 1/2 in)	Eliminated in Episode 4
Tai Watmeuang	26	Bangkok	1.75 m (5 ft 9 in)	Eliminated in Episode 5
Lukkade Piampiboon	17	Ratchaburi	1.77 m (5 ft 9 1/2 in)	Eliminated in Episode 6
Gib Teerawasutkul	20	Bangkok	1.71 m (5 ft 7 1/2 in)	Eliminated in Episode 7
Apple Karachoth	22	Ayuthaya	1.72 m (5 ft 7 1/2 in)	Eliminated in Episode 8
Ratee Ngarmniyom	23	Bangkok	1.77 m (5 ft 9 1/2 in)	Eliminated in Episode 9
Luktarn Puagkong	22	Bangkok	1.69 m (5 ft 6 1/2 in)	Eliminated in Episode 10
Nok Pomanee	19	Bangkok	1.77 m (5 ft 9 1/2 in)	Eliminated in Episode 11
May Sootpa	22	Chiang Mai	1.75 m (5 ft 9 in)	Runner-up
You Kheawchaum	19	Samut Songkhram	1.74 m (5 ft 8 1/2 in)	Winner

== Summaries ==
=== Call-out order ===
Order	Weeks											
Order	1	2	3	4	5	6	7	8	9	10	12	13
1	Luktarn	Ann	Gib	Nok	May	Ratee	You	Nok	You	May	May	You
2	You	Apple	May	Ratee	You	Gib	Nok	Ratee	May	You	You	May
3	Apple	Nok	Ratee	Apple	Ratee	Nok	May	You	Luktarn	Nok	Nok	
4	Ann	May	You	You	Luktarn	You	Luktarn	May	Nok	Luktarn		
5	May	You	Nok	Luktarn	Apple	May	Ratee	Luktarn	Ratee			
6	Nok	Ratee	Lukkade	May	Gib	Apple	Apple	Apple				
7	Ratee	Gib	Apple	Gib	Lukkade	Luktarn	Gib					
8	Lukkade	Luktarn	Luktarn	Tai	Nok	Lukkade						
9	Gib	Tai	Tai	Lukkade	Tai							
10	Tai	Jha	Jha	Jha								
11	Jha	Lukkade	Ann									
12	Numfon	Numfon										
13	Yok											

The contestant was eliminated
The contestant won the competition

- In episode 7, the top 7 girls had makeovers.
- In episode 9 and 10, the top 5 girls gone to tournament on Japan.
- Episode 11 was the recap episode.
- In special episode was a reunion and talk show of contestants. Then, the winner was announced.

=== Photo Shoot & Competition Guide ===
- Episode 1 Photo Shoot: Ayuthaya Temple
- Episode 2 Photo Shoot: Daybeds Magazine
- Episode 3 Competition: Runway for Act cloth
- Episode 4 Photo Shoot: AIIZ on the beach
- Episode 5 Photo Shoot: Levi's Jeans with male model
- Episode 6 Competition: Acting show on stage
- Episode 7 Photo Shoot: L'Oréal Feria
- Episode 8 Photo Shoot: Diamond and Animals
- Episode 9 Photo Shoot: Cars and Spacegirl
- Episode 10 Photo Shoot: Lingerie in Japan
- Episode 12 Photo Shoot: Leo Beer
- Episode 13 Photo Shoot & Commercial: Pond's Day cream Commercial and Print Ad

=== Makeovers ===
This season's makeovers included teeth whitening for the top seven girls.

- Gift: Light brown and curled
- Apple: Dark, Long, and parted
- Gib: Mia Farrow in Rosemary's Baby inspired short hairstyle
- Luktarn: Dark blonde
- Nok: Afro style
- May: Light brown bob cut
- You: Cut short and colored Red

== Presenter & Judges ==
- Sonia Couling, supermodel as presenter & judge
- Rungnapa Kittivat, supermodel as judges
- Sira "O" Kulsrethsiri, fashion stylist as judges
