= Jetrin Wattanasin =

Thai singer and actor (born 1970)

Jetrin Wattanasin เจตริน วรรธนะสิน OD
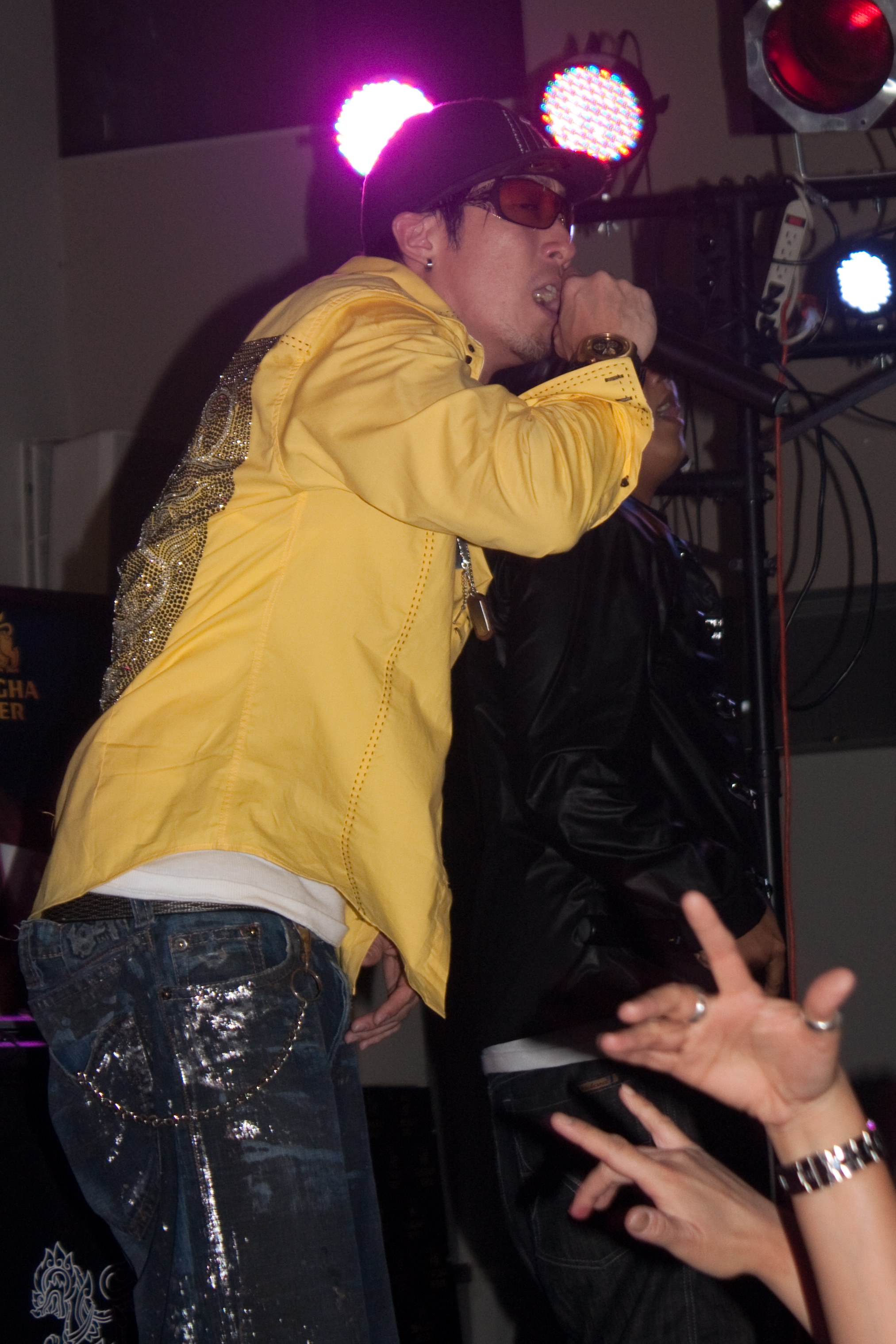
- Jetrin in 2009

Background information
- Also known as: J Jetrin
- Born: 28 October 1970 (age 55); Bangkok, Thailand
- Origin: Bangkok, Thailand
- Genres: Pop; dance-pop; hip-hop; R&B
- Occupations: Singer; songwriter; musician; record producer; actor; dancer
- Instruments: Vocals; drums
- Years active: 1991–present
- Label: GMM Grammy
- Member of: 3 Kings and the Babe; DJ 2 Fives
- Height: 1.82 m (5 ft 11 1/2 in)
- Spouse: Kejmanee Pichaironnarongsongkhram (m. 2001)
- Children: Jayda Gina Na Lamliang; Jinjett Wattanasin; Jakkapat Wattanasin; Jakara Wattanasin
- Father: Charoen Wattanasin
- Relatives: Jirayuth Wattanasin (brother); Jittima Wattanasin (sister)

Jetrin Wattanasin (Thai: เจตริน วรรธนะสิน; RTGS: Chettarin Watthanasin) or J Jetrin (Thai: เจ เจตริน; RTGS: Che Chetrin), is a Thai singer, rapper, and dancer who got his first major break in the music business when he secured heavy promotion by the Thai entertainment company, GMM Grammy. Since 1991, he has produced numerous commercially successful music albums, and continues to tour internationally in support of his most recent recordings. Upon the conclusion of his current United States tour, entitled "The Return of J Jetrin," he will have completed the most extensive tour of the United States by any Thai recording artist, with dates scheduled in 12 US cities, spanning from Hawaii to the East Coast.

== Music career ==
In 1991, Jetrin released his debut solo album Jor-Ae-Bor, emerging from the shadow of his already famous singer brother Jirayuth "Joe" Wattanasin.

After his seventh release 7th Heaven, in November 2007, Jetrin performed over 60 performances around Thailand, concluding with a show entitled "Radioactive the Musical Party by J Jetrin" at the Impact Arena in Bangkok.

Jetrin is currently performing a tour of the United States entitled "The Return of J Jetrin," with dates in Honolulu, Los Angeles, Las Vegas, San Francisco, Fort Worth, Dallas, Washington DC, Atlanta, Boston, New York City, Houston and Chicago. He is performing vocals with the backing of musicians MJ and Bowbo of "3 Kings and the Babe" and DJ 2 Fives. The tour is being sponsored by Singha Beer.

== Acting career ==
To date, Jetrin has appeared in two feature films. The Pang brothers' Hong Kong/Thai 2006 horror-fantasy film, Re-Cycle, as a secondary character, and Chatchai Naksuriya's Thai coming-of-age 2008 film, Friendship, as an older character who recalls his younger days and his first love.

== Personal life ==
=== Early years ===
Born in Bangkok on 28 October 1970, Jetrin is the youngest of three siblings born to a middle-class family. His father is Charoen Wattanasin, an academic and a famous badminton player in the 1950s and 1960s. His sister, Jittima Wattanasin, "Jan", was a model in the Thai fashion industry. Whereas, his brother Jirayuth Wattanasin, "Joe", was one of the lead singers of "Nuvo" – one of GMM Grammy's first and most famous boy-bands. J got a bachelor from Bangkok University and University of California.

=== Recent Times ===
On 27 January 2001, Jetrin married Thai actress, Kejmanee Pichaironnarongsongkhram, and they had three children named Jinjet (Jaonaay) (1st son), Jakkapat (Jaokhun) (2nd son) and Jak (Jaosamut) (3rd son), but he has other one daughter with Gina Li (Jidapa Na Lamliang), named Jayda Na Lamliang.

== Discography ==
- 1991 : Jor-Ae-Bor (Thai: จ เ-ะ บ; RTGS: cho e bo; being the spelling of the word chep (เจ็บ), meaning "pain")
- 1993 : 108-1009
- 1995 : Choola Choola
- 1998 : J-Day
- 2000 : J-Fight
- 2003 : Ta Lok Nee Mai Mee Puu Ying (Thai: ถ้าโลกนี้ไม่มีผู้หญิง; RTGS: Tha Lok Ni Mai Mi Phu Ying; "If This World Had No Women")
- 2008 : 7th Heaven
- 2009 : Joe + J Jetrin – The Brothers Album

== Filmography ==
=== Acting ===
- Re-cycle (2006)
- Friendship: Theu kap chan (2008)

=== Dubbing ===
- Kamen Rider Blade: Missing Ace (2004) as Sakuya Tachibana/Kamen Rider Garren and Covered "Someday Somewhere" in Thai version that was insert song for dubbed version of Kamen Rider Blade: Missing Ace.

== Television ==
TV Series
| Year | Title | Network | With |
|---|---|---|---|
| 1993 | Yam Muea Lom Pat Huan | Channel 5, Thailand | Lalita Panyopas |
| 1993 | Krang Nueng Khittueng Samoe | Channel 7, Thailand | Lalita Panyopas |
| 1995 | Chaopo Champen | Channel 5, Thailand | Sonia Couling |
| 1997 | Ngao Morana | Channel 5, Thailand | Sarocha Wathittaphat |
| 1999 | Love Novel Part 2 | Channel 5, Thailand | Myria Benedetti |
| 2001 | Phet Tut Phet | Channel 7, Thailand | Patcharapa Chaichua |
| 2002 | Moradok Hokkhamen | Channel 5, Thailand | Thanyaret Ramnarong Sarocha Wathittaphat |
| 2002 | Nang Chon | Channel 3, Thailand | Janie Tienphosuwan |
| 2010 | Borisat Sang Suk | Channel 9, Thailand | Nicole Theriault |
| 2013 | my melody 360 degee | Channel 9, Thailand | Katreeya English |

=== TV Program ===
- HBD
- Club no.5 Sport
- 5 Maha Ruai
- Chap Phae Chon Kae
- J Entertainment
- 5 4 3 2 Show Smile Land
- 7 Si Concert
- Saturday Show
- Sport fan
- J minute
- J variety
- Super Gag
- Khun Likhit
- Mo Chit Tit Cho
- World cup mania
- The One
- GT ACADEMY THAILAND 2016
- The Next Boy/Girl Band Thailand 2018

== Endorsements ==
- Brand's
- Malee
- Mitsubishi
- Sunsilk
- Dulux Easy Care
- VOICE TO THAI i-mobile
- Samsung Life Insurance
- Pepsi & Lay's
- Vitamilk
- M-PressoDouble Shot
