= An Ordinary Love Story =

- Film poster
- Thai: รัก
- Directed by: Chatchawan Siwabumrungchai
- Produced by: Santi Prichavongwaikul
- Starring: Billy Ogan; Sonia Couling; Komen Raungkijratanakul; Benchanat Aksonnantha; Khanitkun Netbut; Ping Monotone; Sunkianti Bunnak; Wattana Chumsai Na Ayuthaya; Achita Sikamana
- Cinematography: Nawarophaat Rungphiboonsophit
- Release date: 16 October 2012
- Running time: 110 minutes
- Country: Thailand
- Language: Thai

An Ordinary Love Story (Thai: รัก, romanized: rak) is a 2012 Thai film, a romantic comedy about love, presented with various aspects of it. The movie stars Billy Ogan and model Sonia Couling, and was directed by Chatchawan Siwabumrungchai.

== Plot ==
The movie centres on a wedding where the love stories of four couples ensue, ranging from light-hearted to dramatic. The stories include a long-term husband & wife, a couple who is going to hold their wedding, co-workers and young men.

== Cast ==
- Billy Ogan as Nueng
- Sonia Couling as Winnie
- Komen Raungkijratanakul as Note
- Benchanat Aksonnantha as Nam
- Khanitkun Netbut as Ploy
- Ping Monotone as Tam
- Sunkianti Bunnak as Guy
- Wattana Chumsai Na Ayuthaya as Boat
- Achita Sikamana as Suzi

== Awards and nominations ==
- Nominee National Film Association Award : Best Actor by Komen Raungkijratanakul

== Trivia ==
- Opening film of Hua Hin International Film Festival 2012
- filmed in Hua Hin District, Thailand
