= February (2003 film) =

- The Thai movie poster.
- Directed by: Yuthlert Sippapak
- Written by: Yuthlert Sippapak
- Produced by: Scott Rosenberg; Daniel Silverman
- Starring: Sopitnapa Dabbaransi; Chakrit Yamnam
- Cinematography: Prapop Duangpikul
- Edited by: Yuthlert Sippapak
- Music by: Hualampong Riddim; Vichaya Vatanasapt
- Production company: GMM Pictures
- Distributed by: GDH 559
- Release date: February 14, 2003
- Running time: 108 minutes
- Country: Thailand
- Languages: Thai; English

February (Thai: กุมภาพันธ์ or Khumphaphan) is a 2003 Thai romance-drama film, written and directed by Yuthlert Sippapak.

== Plot ==
The plot involves a young Thai woman with a terminal illness who goes to New York City to live her final months, is hit by a car and then develops amnesia, forgetting that she's in need of medical care. The man who run her over is part of a drug syndicate, and ever since the accident their lives intertwine. The drug dealer wishes to escape his evil life. However, his boss has his passport and will not allow him to exit the country as he wants him to do more jobs.

== Cast ==
- Sopitnapa Dabbaransi as Kaewta
- Chakrit Yamnam as Jeeradech
