= Nirut Sirijanya =

Thai actor (born 1947)

Nirut Sirichanya ChBh
- นิรุตติ์ ศิริจรรยา
- Born: Nirut Sirichanya; 2 May 1947 (age 79); Bangkok, Thailand
- Other name: Nhing
- Occupations: Actor; engineer
- Years active: 1970–present
- Notable work: The Hangover Part II; Lupin the 3rd

Nirut Sirichanya (born 2 May 1947) is a Thai movie and television actor. He is best known internationally for his role as Lauren's father Fong in the 2011 sequel The Hangover Part II. He is the recipient of Suphannahong National Film Awards for Best Supporting Actor.

== Early life ==
Nirut was born on 2 May 1947. He attended Assumption College in Bangkok and received a graduate certificate in Business Administration in Australia. He then went to Kuala Lumpur to study. Upon graduating with a Bachelor of Science degree, he started working at AM PAC as an engineer, before moving to positions in various airline companies, including Alitalia.

== Career ==
Nirut began his acting career at the suggestion of Terng Stiphuang. His first TV series was Sangsoon, in which he co-starred. He then starred in Kae Kop Fah (Just Horizon), shown on Channel 3. By now known throughout Thailand, he attracted the most attention for his part as Jaded in Poo Cha Na Sib Tid.

His first film was Derby, and he continues to perform to this day. He gained international attention from his role in The Hangover Part II.

Nirut also appeared as a judge in the first season of Thailand's Got Talent.

== Filmography ==
=== Television ===
| Year | Title | Role |
|---|---|---|
| 2010 | Fai Amata | Thungfat |
| 2011 | Thailand's Got Talent | Judge |
| 2018 | The Crown Princess | King Henry Antoine Phillipe of Hrysos |
| 2018 | Love Destiny | Chaophraya Horathibodi, Dej's father |
| 2019 | Until We Meet Again | Mr. Ariyasakul, Korn's father |
| 2021 | Tea Box | Vichai |
| 2021 | Tawan Tok Din | Than |
| 2022 | Devil Sister | Anon |
| 2022 | Sai Lub Lip Gloss | Senit |
| 2022 | Dong Dok Mai | Sakon |
| 2023 | Tee Sood Kong Huajai | |
| 2025 | The Next Prince | Thipokbowon Assavadevathin |

=== Film ===
| Year | Title | Role | Note |
|---|---|---|---|
| 2003 | MahaAut | Kajorn | |
| 2004 | Thawhiphob | Mannichan's Father | |
| 2005 | Shum Mha Puen | Lhi Meng | |
| 2005 | The King Maker | Pha Chairacha | |
| 2006 | The Last Song | Pradhung | |
| 2006 | Archan Yai | Doctor.Prakij | |
| 2007 | Hitman File | Lheemang | |
| 2007 | Opapatika | Sadok | |
| 2007 | Protégé | Gen Chanchai | |
| 2008 | Ong Bak 2 | Bua | |
| 2009 | Formosa Betrayed | Professor Huang | |
| 2010 | Duang Antrarai | Jay's Father | |
| 2010 | Ong Bak 3 | Bua | |
| 2011 | The Burma Conspiracy | Général Kyaw Min | |
| 2011 | The Hangover Part II | Fong Srisai, Lauren's father | |
| 2011 | Kon Khon | Khuu Sek | |
| 2013 | King Naresuan 5 | Toungoo | |
| 2013 | Clouds of Memories | Zak | |
| 2014 | The Last Executioner | TV Interviewer | |
| 2014 | Lupin the 3rd | Pramuk | |
| 2016 | Senses from Siam | Tanthong | |
| 2018 | Mordkommission Istanbul: Thailand | Somchai | |
| 2019 | The Cave | Minister of Tourism | |
| TBA | The Knife Thrower | Manit Lekpai | Pre-Production |

== Accolades ==
| Awards | Year | Category | Nominee/work | Result |
|---|---|---|---|---|
| Suphannahong National Film Awards | 2006 | Best Supporting Actor | The Last Song | Won |
| Suphannahong National Film Awards | 2007 | Best Supporting Actor | Hitman File | Nominated |
| Suphannahong National Film Awards | 2012 | Best Supporting Actor | Kon Khon | Nominated |
| Asian Television Awards | 2021 | Best Actor in a Leading Role | Teabox: Old Man and a Mad Dog | Nominated |
