= Sonia Couling =

Thai model, actress and television personality

- ซอนย่า คูลลิ่ง
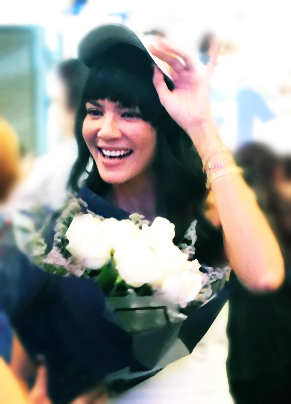
- Couling at The Face Men Thailand press conference in 2018
- Born: June 18, 1974 (age 52); Bangkok, Thailand
- Other names: Pim (พิม); Sonia Couling Vacharasinthu
- Education: Bachelor of International Business, European Business School London (EBS London)
- Occupations: Actress; model; VJ; polo rider; pilot; MC; producer
- Years active: 1989–present
- Known for: Maya (2001); Thailand's Next Top Model (2005); The Mark (2012-2013); The Face Thailand (2018)
- Height: 1.70 m (5 ft 7 in)
- Spouse: Paul-Dominique Vacharasinthu (m. 2007)
- Children: 1

Sonia Couling (also spelled Sonia Cooling, Sonya Couling or Sonya Cooling) (Thai: ซอนย่า คูลลิ่ง; June 18, 1974 in Bangkok, Thailand), nickname Pim (Thai: พิม; RTGS: Phim), is a Thai model, actress and television personality. She has appeared in many Thai films and TV shows, been a VJ for MTV Asia, been a host for HBO Asia and has produced and hosted Thailand's Next Top Model in 2005. Couling has also acted in Hollywood and French productions. She is of English and Thai descent.

== Biography ==
=== Early life ===
Couling is Eurasian or Luk khrueng, with an English father and a Thai mother; fluent in Thai, English and French. She also speaks German and Italian. She attended St Michael's all-girls boarding school in Surrey, England and studied German literature at University College London. She graduated from European Business School London (EBS London) with Bachelor of International Business in 1998.

=== Career ===
Couling started her modeling career in a 7Up advertisement when she was 13. While attending boarding school and university in the UK, she worked with Storm modeling agency in London.

Once back in Asia, she settled into a supermodel role, and has been in advertisements for Asian beauty product companies, such L'Oreal Asia, Olay Asia, Nivea Visage, Eucerin, 1st Asian Ambassador for Rado watches, and Clairol Worldwid.

In 1998 Couling became VJ for MTV Asia, based in Singapore. She was the first Thai woman to .

In 1999 Couling was voted Thailand's sexiest woman by FHM. The UK magazine FHM chose her as number one sexiest woman in Thailand and second in Asia and 10 sexiest women in the world. In 2016 she was chosen as the most beautiful Thai actress.

In 2002 she won Best Actress in a Lead Role at the TV Gold Awards (Thai television awards) for her performance as Phitawan Satchamat in Thai TV series Maya (2001).

Couling also works behind the cameras producing TV show Thailand's Next Top Model (2005) and internationally as the executive producer on A Stranger in Paradise (2013).

In addition, Couling has starred in international films and TV series, including The Mark, The Mark: Redemption and Strike Back : Legacy.

In 2018, she appeared on The Face Thailand season 4 All Stars and The Face Men Thailand (season 2) as a mentor and The Next Boy/Girl Band Thailand as a producer.

=== The face of Muay Thai ===
Couling, who is Thailand's number one international celebrity and has been involved in many Muay Thai projects, has been chosen to be the face of Muay Thai.

Her in-depth experience with Muay Thai, includes having been an English announcer in Jao Muay Thai Fight at Siam Boxing Stadium on Thai TV3 for 3 years, hosted and MC'd The 2010 King's Cup and The 2010 Queen's Cup and plenty more. She, moreover, appeared on The Challenger Muay Thai (2011) on AXN as a ring announcer, and hosted Muay Thai Premier League (2012) on FOX.

=== Personal life ===
On 8 September 2007, Couling married Paul-Dominique Vacharasinthu, who is Thai-French. They have a son, Pasha-Dominic Vacharasinthu (b. 21 October 2015).

Couling flies single engine planes, reserve pilot for the Royal Thai Air Force where she was a guest pilot on the F5 and F16 fighter planes. She is also a horse rider and female polo player.

In January 2023, she was a guest at the royal wedding of Princess Azemah of Brunei.

== Filmography ==
Films
Year	Title	Role	Studio	Notes	Notes #2	With
1997	Destiny Upside Down	Chik	Five Star Production	Lead Role	Thailand	Jesdaporn Pholdee, Shahkrit Yamnam
2003	Final Combat	Butterfly		Lead Role	Hollywood	Tonny White
2007	History			Lead Role	Thailand	Prinya Intachai
2011	Largo Winch II : The Burma Conspiracy	Wang	Pan Européenne	Guest Role	France / Belgium / Germany	-
2012	An Ordinary Love Story	Winnie	Magical Love	Lead Role	Thailand	Billy Ogan
2012	Blood and High Heels	Rose Red	Dotkom Media	Lead Role	Hungary	Iván Kamarás
2012	The Mark	Dao	Pure Flix Entertainment	Lead Role	Hollywood	Craig Sheffer
2013	The Mark: Redemption	Dao	Pure Flix Entertainment	Lead Role	Hollywood	Craig Sheffer
2013	A Stranger in Paradise	Chris	Cinema Management Group	Supporting Role	Hollywood	-
2014	Glory Days	Tammy	Radical Entertainment	Guest Role	Hollywood	-
2019	Paradise Beach	Aom	7e Apache Film	Supporting Role	France	Tewfik Jallab
2019	General Commander	Sonia Dekker	Saradan Media	Main Cast	Hollywood	Steven Seagal
2024	Operation Blood Hunt	Heirani		Main Cast	Hollywood	Louis Mandylor
2026	Holiguards Saga — The Portal of Force	Elena	Elledgy Media Group	Supporting Role	Hollywood	Kevin Spacey
TBA	Al B. and the Concrete Jungle	Jayla	One Ocean Productions	Supporting Role	Hollywood	Alejandro Santoni

== Television ==
=== TV series ===
Television
Year	Title	Role	Network	Notes	With
1994	Sonthana Prasa Chon	Duaenden	Channel 5, Thailand	Lead Role	Sanya Khunakon
1995	Chaopo Champen	Natcha	Channel 5, Thailand	Lead Role	Jetrin Wattanasin
1996	Yiam Wiman	Waeophloy	Channel 3, Thailand	Lead Role	Johnny Anfone
1997	Tawan Yo Saeng	Tawan Yosaeng Dechabodin	Channel 3, Thailand	Lead Role	Sarunyoo Wongkrachang
1997	Lueatrak Lueatritsaya		Channel 3, Thailand	Lead Role	Kanchai Kamnoetploy
1998	Khwamrak Kap Ngoentra (Love and Money)	Irin	Channel 3, Thailand	Lead Role	Billy Ogan
1999	Phreng Ngao	Miriam (Muk)	Channel 3, Thailand	Lead Role	Thanakorn Poshyananda
2001	Maya	Phitawan Satchamat	Channel 7, Thailand	Lead Role	Thiraphat Satchakun
2002	Nang Miao Yom Si	Girl	Channel 3, Thailand	Guest Role	Aphinan Praseritwatnakun
2002	Chaochai Huajai Ken Roi	Princess Minya	Channel 7, Thailand	Guest Role	Patiparn Patavekarn
2003	Phayakrai 6 Phandin (Asian King)	Pinpak	Channel 3, Thailand	Lead Role	Dom Hetrakul
2009	Susan Phutesuan	Golden Lotus (Mataenai / Nithithepin)	Channel 3, Thailand	Main Cast	Chatchai Plengpanich
2009	Sood Sanae Ha	Sophita "Ta" Jarukorn	Channel 3, Thailand	Main Cast	Willy McIntosh
2010	Fai Amata (Be A Better Man)	Kelly Yao	Channel 9, Thailand	Lead Role	Shahkrit Yamnam
2012	Nuer Mek 2	Police Major Rawi Ingkhaphat	Channel 3, Thailand	Supporting Role	Chatchai Plengpanich
2015	Ugly Betty Thailand	Alisa "Alice" Phalakon	Thairath TV, Thailand	Main Cast	-
2015	Phoeng Dao	Rada Sasirada	PPTV, Thailand	Lead Role	Thana Iamniyom
2015	Strike Back : Legacy	Lawan	Sky One (UK), Cinemax (US)	Supporting Role	-
2018	My Hero : Matuphoom Haeng Huachai	Madam Maytu A	Channel 3, Thailand	Main Cast	Shahkrit Yamnam

=== TV Program ===
Television
Year	Title	Role	Network
1998-2000	MTV Asia	VJ	MTV Asia
1998	Zoom	herself/ as host	Channel 5, Thailand
2000	Asian Television Awards	herself/ as host	
2002-2005	Jao Muay Thai Fight	herself/ as Announcer	Thai TV 3, Thailand
2005	Thailand's Next Top Model	Presenter & Headjudge	Thai TV 3, Thailand
2005	Miss Universe 2005'; Costume Events	herself/ as host	NBC, Telemundo, Channel 7
2007	Asian Television Awards	herself/ as host	
20??	HBO Central	herself/ as host	HBO Asia
2010	The Price of Beauty	Beauty Ambassador	VH1, United States
2010	The One	herself/ as host	Channel 9, Thailand
2011	Miss Earth 2011	herself/ as host	ABS-CBN, Philippines
2011	The Challenger Muay Thai	herself/ as Ring Announcer	AXN, United States
2012	Muay Thai Premier League	herself/ as host	FOX, FOX sport
2013	Miss Grand International 2013	herself/ as host	Channel 7, Thailand
2014	Miss Grand International 2014	herself/ as host	Channel 7, Thailand
2017	The Face Thailand season 3	herself/ as guest mentor	Channel 3, Thailand
2017	Beauty Battle Thailand	herself/ as host	One 31, Thailand
2018	The Face Thailand season 4 All Stars	herself/ as mentor	Channel 3, Thailand
2018	The Next Boy/Girl Band Thailand	herself/ as producer	Channel 7, Thailand
2018	The Face Men Thailand (season 2)	herself/ as mentor	PPTV, Thailand

=== Production ===
- Thailand's Next Top Model as Executive producer
- A Stranger in Paradise as Executive producer

== Endorsements ==
- Seven Up (1989, Thailand) (debut)
- Coffeemate (1992, Thailand)
- Kotex Soft Dry (1995, Thailand)
- Nissin Cup Noodle (1996, Thailand)
- Spy Drinks (1999, Thailand)
- Honda City Type-Z (2002, Thailand)
- Sony Vega TV (2005, Thailand)
- Ricoh Printers (2005, Thailand)
- AIS GSM (2006, Thailand)
- Olay Total Effects (2007, Thailand)
- Ocean 1 Tower (2008, Thailand)
- Eucerin (2012, Thailand)
- Sunsilk (Thailand)
- Nivea (Thailand)
- Doritos 3D (Thailand)
- Kodak Film (Thailand)
- Christian Dior; J’adore L’or (2018, Thailand)
- Clairol Shampoo (Worldwide)
- Olay Total Effects (Asia)
- L'Oreal (Asia)
- Rado Watches (Asia)
- Nikon Cameras (Asia)
- Secrets Deodorant (Thailand & Philippines)
- Smart Telecom (Philippines)
- Singapore Telecom (Singapore)
- Haagan Dazs (Singapore)
- Eucerin (2017, Malaysia)

== Awards and nominations ==
Awards
Year	Award	Category	Nominated Work	Result
1996	TV Gold Awards	Best Actress in a Lead Role	Yiam Wiman	Nominated
2002	TV Gold Awards	Best Actress in a Lead Role	Maya	Won
