= The Face Thailand season 3 =

The Face Thailand
- Season 3
- Promotional poster from episodes 8-13
- No. of episodes: 13

Release
- Original network: Channel 3
- Original release: 4 February – 29 April 2017

Season chronology
- ← Previous; Season 2 Next → Season 4

The Face Thailand Season 3 began audition on 14 August 2016 at shopping mall Siam Paragon in Bangkok. 3 September 2016 Lukkade Metinee and Bee Namthip was reprised their roles as coaches again and Marsha Vadhanapanich was the new coach in this season, but quit in episode 8 and was replaced by Cris Horwang. Khun Chanon was still a host in season 3. 13 September 2016 had announced the launch and presented fifty contestants from the audition. The season premiered on 4 February 2017 (Note: It originally aired on 29 October 2016, however due to the death of Bhumibol Adulyadej, it temporary canceled until it will be airing on 4 February 2017.)

== Contestants ==
(ages stated are at start of filming)

Contestant	Age	Height	Hometown	Model coach		Finish	Rank
Racha "Boongkie" Rakkhapan	26	1.76 m (5 ft 9 1/2 in)	Samut Sakhon	Marsha		Episode 2	15
Purichaya "Metploy" Jenjobjing	19	1.78 m (5 ft 10 in)	Chonburi	Lukkade		Episode 4	14
Wanvisa "Maya" Goldman	22	1.73 m (5 ft 8 in)	Chiang Mai	Marsha		Episode 5	13
Korawan "Prim" Lodsantia	22	1.77 m (5 ft 9 1/2 in)	Nakhon Ratchasima	Marsha		Episode 6	12
Jutharat "Kaw" Kaewmanee	27	1.70 m (5 ft 7 in)	Bangkok	Bee		Episode 8	11
Chananchida "Blossom" Roongpetchrat	25	1.75 m (5 ft 9 in)	Bangkok	Bee		Episode 9	10
Nathachat "Hana" Chancheaw	25	1.80 m (5 ft 11 in)	Surin	Lukkade	Cris	Episode 10	9
Wilawan "Julie" Anderson	22	1.77 m (5 ft 9 1/2 in)	Chonburi	Marsha	Cris	Episode 11	8
Pharanya "Tubtim" Labudomsakul	23	1.73 m (5 ft 8 in)	Ubon Ratchathani	Bee		Episode 12	7-5
Tia Li Taveepanichpan	20	1.72 m (5 ft 7 1/2 in)	Phuket	Bee		Episode 12	7-5
Puttida "Mint" Samainiyom	20	1.75 m (5 ft 9 in)	Kanchanaburi	Lukkade		Episode 12	7-5
Maria "Sky" Hoerschler	21	1.73 m (5 ft 8 in)	Ubon Ratchathani	Bee		Episode 13	4-2
Nattaya "Plengkwan" Tongsen	18	1.75 m (5 ft 9 in)	Phuket	Lukkade		Episode 13	4-2
Peemsinee "Fah" Sawangkla	22	1.78 m (5 ft 10 in)	Nonthaburi	Lukkade		Episode 13	4-2
Natthaya "Grace" Boonchompaisarn	22	1.75 m (5 ft 9 in)	Bangkok	Marsha	Cris	Episode 13	1

=== Future appearances ===
Korawan Lodsantia, Nathachat Chancheaw, Wilawan Anderson (changed her name to Zeththinich Chanavarasutthisiri), Tia Li Taveepanichpan, Maria Hoerschler, and Peemsinee Sawangkla returned for The Face Thailand season 4: All Stars.

== Episodes ==
=== Episode 1: Casting ===
First aired 4 February 2017

In the first week is to qualify for all 50 people to shoot and the next natural makeup to steer his team to three Mentor, it was decided by a shoot. Contestants from 50 finalists who had to walk around 35 people. In the second round as a model for screening into three teams, Mentor was the decision by walking and the third round to make up for Mentor selected by a team of around 23 people coming through and finalists 15 people.

- Team Bee: Tia, Khaw, Blossom, Sky, Tubtim.
- Team Lukkade: Hana, Mint, Metploy, Plengkhwan, Fah.
- Team Marsha: Boongkie, Maya, Julie, Grace, Prim.
- Featured photographer: Surachai Saengsuwan
- Special guest: Piyarat Kaljareuk

=== Episode 2: Opposite Attraction ===
First aired 11 February 2017

- Winning coach and team: Bee Namthip
- Bottom two: Plengkwan Tongsen & Boongkie Rakkhapan
- Eliminated: Boongkie Rakkhapan
- Special guest: Tae Piyarat
- Special mentor: Janie Tienphosuwan

=== Episode 3: Red Carpet Catwalk With Toyota Camry ===
First aired 18 February 2017

- Winning coach and team: Bee Namthip
- Bottom two: Hana Chancheaw & Maya Goldman
- Eliminated: Hana Chancheaw

=== Episode 4: Photo Shoot Crème Body Wash ===
First aired 25 February 2017

- Winning coach and team: Marsha Vadhanapanich
- Bottom two: Blossom Roongpetchrat & Metploy Jenjobjing
- Eliminated: Metploy Jenjobjing
- Special guest: Davika Hoorne

=== Episode 5: Smoke Bomb Fashion Video ===
First aired 4 March 2017

- Winning coach and team: Lukkade Metinee
- Bottom two: Tubtim Labudomsakul & Maya Goldman
- Eliminated: Maya Goldman

=== Episode 6: Rainy Catwalk ===
First aired 11 March 2017

- Winning coach and team: Lukkade Metinee
- Bottom two: Tia Taveepanichpan & Prim Lodsantia
- Eliminated: Prim Lodsantia
- Special guest: Sonia Couling, Sabina Meisinger & Kanticha Chumma

=== Episode 7: Make New York Angels Happen ===
First aired 18 March 2017

- Winning coach and team: Marsha Vadhanapanich
- Bottom two: Tubtim Labudomsakul & Mint Samainiyom
- Eliminated: Mint Samainiyom
- Special guest: Janie Tienphosuwan & Ranee Campen

=== Episode 8: SnailWhite Winter Runway ===
First aired 25 March 2017

- Winning coach and team: Lukkade Metinee
- Bottom two: Kaw Kaewmanee & Julie Anderson
- Eliminated: Kaw Kaewmanee

In this episode, Marsha Vadhanapanich quit and was replaced by Cris Horwang.

=== Episode 9: Morning after ===
First aired 1 April 2017

- Returned in new team: Hana Chancheaw
- Returned in original team: Mint Samainiyom
- Winning coach and team: Cris Horwang
- Bottom two: Blossom Roongpetchrat & Fah Sawangkla
- Eliminated: Blossom Roongpetchrat
- Special guest: Pachara Chirathivat & Luis Meza

=== Episode 10: Zorb Ball Catwalk ===
First aired 8 April 2017

- Winning coach and team: Bee Namthip
- Bottom two: Mint Samainiyom & Hana Chancheaw
- Eliminated: Hana Chancheaw
- Special guest: Pan Pan Narkprasert, Urassaya Sperbund & Polpat Asavaprapha

=== Episode 11: Heaven Helps You ===
First aired 15 April 2017

- Winning coach and team: Lukkade Metinee
- Bottom two: Tubtim Labudomsakul & Julie Anderson
- Eliminated: Julie Anderson
- Special guest: Luis Meza

=== Episode 12: Make New York MV Happen ===
First aired 22 April 2017

- Winning coach and team: Lukkade Metinee
- Winning campaign: Plengkhwan Tongsen
- Final three was chosen by Coach: Grace Boonchompaisarn, Fah Sawangkla & Sky Hoerschler
- Fourth final was chosen by coach from winning campaign team: Plengkhwan Tongsen
- Eliminated: Mint Samainiyom, Tia Taveepanichpan & Tubtim Labudomsakul
- Special guest: Urassaya Sperbund

=== Episode 13: Final Walk ===
First aired 29 April 2017

- Final four: Fah Sawangkla , Plengkhwan Tongsen , Sky Hoerschler & Grace Boonchompaisarn
- Partner: Kanticha Chumma, Wanpiya Ormsinnoppakul, Virahya Pattarachokchai & Jutiporn Arunchot
- Winning campaign: Fah Sawangkla
- Eliminated: None
- The Face Thailand: Grace Boonchompaisarn
- Winning coach and team: Cris Horwang
- Special guest: Marsha Vadhanapanich, Rhatha Phongam, Sabina Meisinger & Kanticha Chumma
- Honorary guest: Princess Ubolratana Rajakanya Sirivadhana Barnavadi

== Summaries ==
=== Elimination Table ===
Team Bee	Team Lukkade	Team Marsha	Team Cris

Place	Contestant	Episodes														
Place	Contestant	1	2	3	4	5	6	7	8	9		10	11	12	13	
1	Grace	IN	IN	IN	WIN	IN	IN	WIN	IN	IN	WIN	IN	IN	LOW	IN	WINNER
2-4	Sky	IN	WIN	WIN	IN	IN	IN	IN	IN	IN	IN	WIN	IN	LOW	IN	RUNNER-UP
2-4	Fah	IN	IN	IN	IN	WIN	WIN	IN	WIN	IN	LOW	IN	WIN	LOW	WIN	RUNNER-UP
2-4	Plengkwan	IN	LOW	IN	IN	WIN	WIN	IN	WIN	IN	IN	IN	WIN	WIN	IN	RUNNER-UP
5-7	Tia	IN	WIN	WIN	IN	IN	LOW	IN	IN	IN	IN	WIN	IN	OUT		
5-7	Tubtim	IN	WIN	WIN	IN	LOW	IN	LOW	IN	IN	IN	WIN	LOW	OUT		
5-7	Mint	IN	IN	IN	IN	WIN	WIN	OUT		RET	IN	LOW	WIN	OUT		
8	Julie	IN	IN	IN	WIN	IN	IN	WIN	LOW	IN	WIN	IN	OUT			
9	Hana	IN	IN	OUT						RET	WIN	OUT				
10	Blossom	IN	WIN	WIN	LOW	IN	IN	IN	IN	IN	OUT					
11	Kaw	IN	WIN	WIN	IN	IN	IN	IN	OUT							
12	Prim	IN	IN	IN	WIN	IN	OUT									
13	Maya	IN	IN	LOW	WIN	OUT										
14	Metploy	IN	IN	IN	OUT											
15	Boongkie	IN	OUT													

The contestant was part of the winning team for the episode.
The contestant was at risk of elimination.
The contestant was eliminated from the competition.
The contestant was originally eliminated but was returned to the competition on their original team.
The contestant was originally eliminated but was returned to the competition and switched to a new team.
The contestant won the campaign individually.
The contestant was a Runner-Up.
The contestant won The Face.

- Episode 1 was the casting episode. The final fifteen were divided into individual teams of five as they were selected.
- In episode 6, Sonia Couling replaced Lukkade for elimination.
- In episode 8, Marsha quit as a mentor. She was replaced by Cris, and the members of team Marsha (Grace and Julie) were transferred over to Cris' team.
- In episode 9, Hana and Mint form Team Lukkade returned to the competition. Hana returned to Team Cris and Mint returned to her original team.
- In episode 12, Plengkwan won the campaign individually, automatically advancing into the finale. Lukkade, Bee and Cris were allowed to choose any one contestant to advance into the finale from the remaining seven models. Lukkade chose Fah, Bee chose Sky, and Cris chose Grace. Tia, Tubtim and Mint were eliminated.
- In episode 13, Fah won the campaign individually, however there was no elimination so all contestants were put through to the final runway.

=== Campaigns ===
- Episode 1: Naked face group shots, Runway and Self Administered 'Transformations' (Casting)
- Episode 2: Opposite Attraction
- Episode 3: Red Carpet Catwalk With Toyota Camry
- Episode 4: Namu Life SnailWhite Créme Body Wash
- Episode 5: Smoke Bomb Fashion Video
- Episode 6: Rainy Catwalk
- Episode 7: Make New York Angels Happen
- Episode 8: SnailWhite Winter Runway
- Episode 9: Morning After
- Episode 10: Zorb Ball Catwalk
- Episode 11: Heaven Helps You
- Episode 12: Make it happen-MV
- Episode 13: Acting short film for Samsung Galaxy S8+ and Final walk
