= Nicole Theriault =

Thai singer and actress

- นิโคล เทริโอ
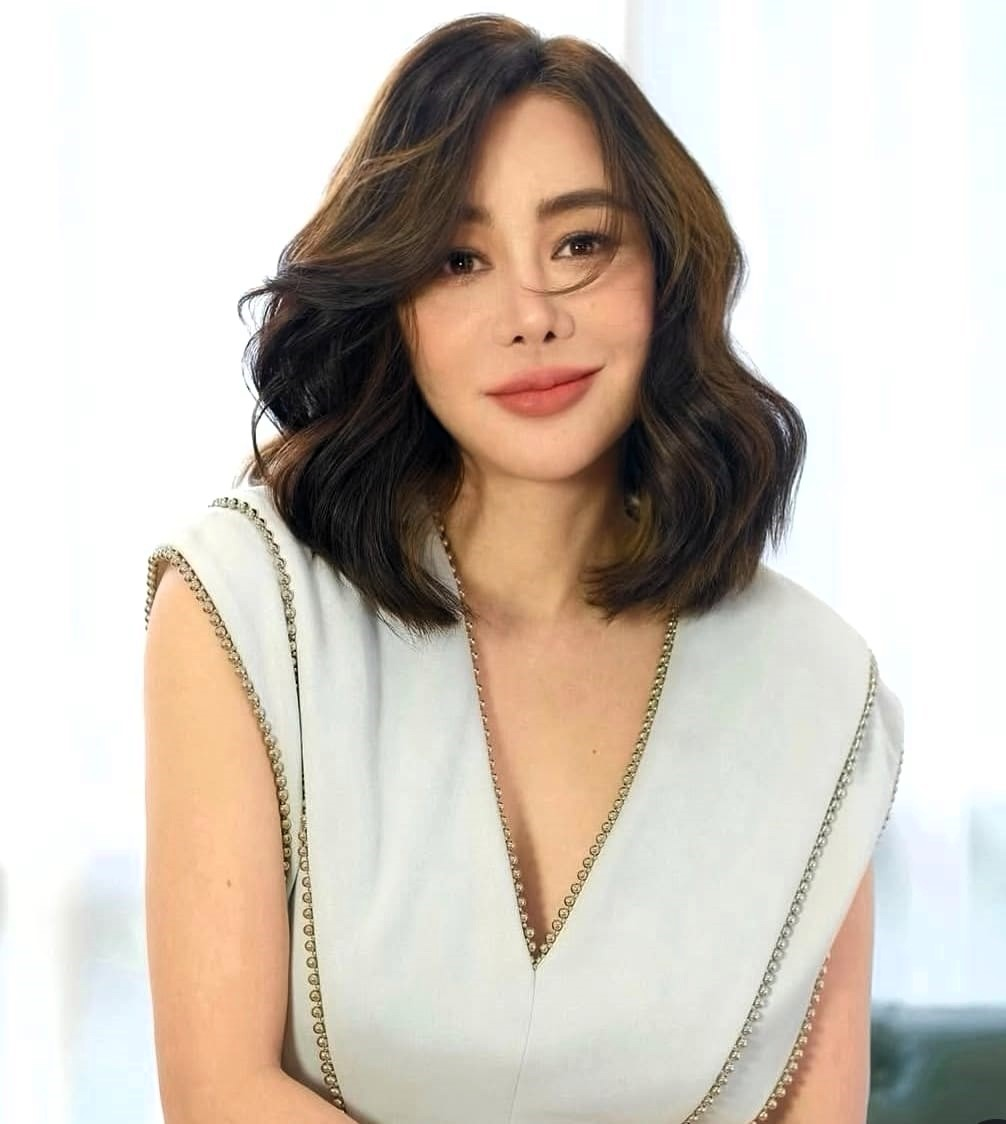
- Born: Nicole Theriault (นิโคล เทริโอ); 23 June 1972 (age 54); California, United States
- Other name: Nikki
- Occupations: Singer; Actress
- Years active: 1990–present
- Spouse: Jirasuk Panphum (m. 2004; div. 2008)
- Children: 1
- Musical career
- Genres: Pop; Dance; Electronic dance
- Labels: GMM Grammy; Muzik Move

Nicole Theriault (Thai: นิโคล เทริโอ; born 23 June 1972), known as Nikki, is a Thai singer and actress, who went platinum with 2 million copies sold on her debut album Ka-Po-Lo Club and went double platinum on her second album Funny Lady earning her Breakout Artist of the Year for her first album and Best Female Artist of the Year for her second album. She has released a total of 13 albums which includes 5 solo albums and the remaining being collaborations and cover albums.

== Early life and education ==
Born in California, Theriault is the daughter of a French American father, Robert Theriault, and a Thai mother, Pornthip Theriault. Her father worked for 30 years for the Tourism Authority of Thailand as a producer on television and radio to promote tourism in Thailand. Her mother was a guidance counselor for underprivileged women and dedicated her life to helping abused women. Her parents met in graduate school after her mother got her bachelor's in political science from Chulalongkorn University. Her father served in the United States Air Force and was assigned to NASA in a training mission with the astronauts of Apollo 11 and was never sent to Vietnam. She is related to the Theriault family in Edmundston, New Brunswick.

Theriault began her schooling in Bangkok at Twinkle Star Kindergarten and attended grades one through three at Ruamrudee International School. She continued her education for the next three years preparatory pchool in the United States. Her family returned to Bangkok, where she completed her secondary education. She attended Assumption University for two years, but finished her bachelor's in arts at Framingham College in Massachusetts. She also earned a bachelor's in business at Columbia College in Chicago.

Theriault began her career after returning to Thailand. She has been active since 1998 in producing music, singing, acting, and performing live in theatre and concerts.

== Personal life ==
Theriault married singer/producer Jirasuk Panphum on 24 January 2004. She gave birth to their son on 8 February 2005. Theriault and Panphum announced on 15 February 2008, that they have ended their marriage.

== Discography ==
=== Albums ===
- 1998 – Ka-Po-Lo Club (กะ-โป-โล-คลับ)
- 1999 – Funny Lady (บุษบาหน้าเป็น)
- 2000 – Another Part Of Me
- 2000 – Seven
- 2001 – นิโคลพันธุ์ดุ (Dangerous Nicole)
- 2001 – Merry Christmas
- 2001 – PlayTime
- 2002 – Two Faces Of Love
- 2003 – หัวใจเดินทาง(On the Way)
- 2004 – Asanee Pee Nong Rong Praeng
- 2013 – Single Eek Krung Nung (Music Move)
- 2015 – Single Numtah Yod Naiy (Music Move)
- 2016 – Single Tua Tid Gun (Music Move)
- 2017 – Nicole Theriault Best Selected (GMM Grammy Records)
- 2018 – Master's Collection (GMM Grammy Records)
- 2018 – Hai Okard Charn Noi (ให้โอกาสฉันหน่อย)
- 2019 – Rewrite The Stars (cover version)

=== Special albums ===
- 1999 – Funny Lady Acoustic Version (บุษบาหน้าเป็น อะคูสติกเวอร์ชัน)
- 2000 – Another Part Of Me
- 2000 – Seven
- 2001 – Playtime
- 2001 – Merry Christmas
- 2002 – Two Faces Of Love
- 2007 – Nicole Beautiful Life

=== Stage/Theatre Performance ===
- 2000 – Aroka Jom Yakub Yajai
- 2009 – Breath The Musical (Lomhaijai The Musical)
- 2013 – Laddaland
- 2018 – Still on My Mind the Musical

== Filmography ==
Her leading international roles include HBO's 'Halfworlds'in 2016 and NETFLIX's 'Innocence: Bangkok Love Story'in 2018. She headlined in numerous musicals, the first with Thongchai McIntyre, Thailand's mega superstar, followed by 'Breathe the Musical', Laddaland, a thriller drama with Mos Pattiparn and her latest theater performance was at the end of 2018 as the lead in 'Still on My Mind the Musical'at Muangthai Rachadalai Theater (all musicals performed here: Thailand's equivalent of Broadway). Nicole has released a single a year as an independent artist after leaving GMM Grammy Records and has just released a cover version of 'Rewrite the Stars' in June 2019 with Thai entrepreneur Patee Sarasin (former CEO of Nok Air). Her current work is showing on Channel One 31 Mondays through Thursdays at 7 pm in a comedy series 'Leila TidaYuk' and is shooting an upcoming TV drama as Rose in 'Don't Touch My Dad' which will air on PPTV in August.

=== Movie discography ===
- 2002 – One Night Husband (Kuen Rai Ngaow)
- 2009 – Phobia 2 (5 Praeng)
- 2012 – Virgin Am I
- 2015 – Zero Tolerance
- 2016 – Face Off
- 2021 - The Whole Truth (Netflix)

== Television ==
=== Drama ===
- Niyai Rak Phak 2 (Channel 5, 1999) _{(Guest)}
- RUN Rak Antarai (Channel 5, 2001)
- Bunga Nafon (Channel 5, 2011)
- Manya Ritsaya (Channel 5, 2012)
- Luk Phi Luk Nong (Channel 9, 2013)
- The Sixth Sense 2 (Channel 3, 2013)
- Ruean Ritsaya (Channel 3, 2014) _{(Guest)}
- Leh Nangfah (Channel 5, 2014)
- Buang Man (Channel 3, 2014)
- Ugly Betty Thailand (Thairath TV, 2015)
- Halfworlds (HBO Asia, 2015)
- Buang Rak Salak Khaen (Channel 8, 2016)
- Khwam Rak Khrang Sut Tai (GMM, 2017)
- Innocence (Netflix. Worldwide, 2018)
- Leila Tida Yuk (Channel One 31 2019 – now showing Mon-Thurs 7 pm
- Don't Touch My Dad (PPTV 2019 –

In production. Scheduled air date: August 2019

=== TV Program ===
- Dancing with the Stars (Thailand season 1) (channel 7, 2013)
- The Mask Singer (Workpoint, 2017)
- I Can See Your Voice Thailand (Workpoint, 2017)
- The Next Boy/Girl Band Thailand (channel 7, 2018)

== Awards ==
- Nominated 1998 MTV Video Music Awards by MTV Asia : International Viewer's Choice Awards : Nicole Theriault – "Kapolo"
- Winner (Kom Chud Luk Award) Best Actress in a Leading Role in a Motion Picture 'One Night Busband
- Winner (Top Award 2000) Artist of the Year
- Nominated Best Actress in a Leading Role 'Phobia 2'
- Winner ELLE Style Awards 2001
- Awarded by His Majesty the King Rama X (then His Royal Highness Crown Prince Cbulalongkorn) Person of the Year in Public Service in Performing Arts
