= Vikrom Kromadit =

Thai businessman

- วิกรม กรมดิษฐ์
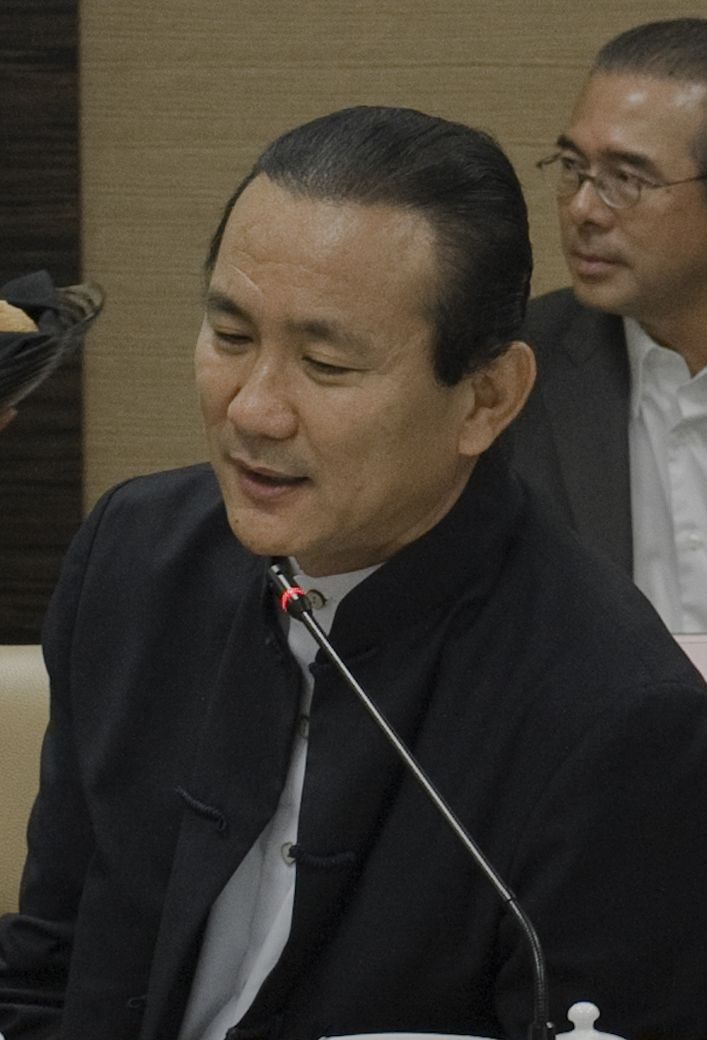
- Born: Tinfong Siangkhiu (邱頂峰); 17 March 1953 (age 73); Kanchanaburi, Thailand
- Education: National Taiwan University
- Occupation: Developing Industrial Estate
- Spouse: Kelly Yao (div.)
- Parents: Thungfat Siangkhiu (father); Chia Siangchong (mother)
- Website: Official website

Vikrom Kromadit (Thai: วิกรม กรมดิษฐ์; RTGS: Wikrom Krommadit) is a Thai businessman and writer. He is the founder and chief executive officer of Amata Corporation PCL. Currently, he is living in Khao Yai, Nakhon Ratchasima and also the owner of industrial estate in 3 locations.

== History ==
Vikrom Kromadit was born on 17 March 1953 in Kanchanaburi province. His ancestors were predominantly Hakka Chinese, who immigrated to Kanchanaburi in the 19th century. He also has Teochew Chinese ancestry through his paternal grandmother and Tai and Mon ancestry through his maternal grandmother. He is the eldest son in his family, with 23 brothers and sisters (a number that includes stepbrothers and stepsisters). He has been interested in business and marketing since childhood while still studying in grade 3, he took over a roasted peanut shop started by his aunt. He graduated from the National Taiwan University in Taipei where he received a scholarship Taiwan government with a Bachelor of Mechanical Engineering. He returned to Thailand and set up an import and export business in 1975 under the name of V&K Corporation Ltd. Afterwards he moved into developing industrial estates; he now has three estates in Thailand and two in Vietnam, with a total gross output of some 30 billion us Dollar and employing around 200,000 people.

Vikrom Kromadit serves as both the chief executive officer of Amata Corporation Public Company and as a chairman of the Amata Foundation. In 2007, he ranked as 27th of the 40 richest men in Thailand by Forbes magazine, and the next year named him one of the 48 heroes of Philanthropy in Asia.

For his future projects is Amata Castle, which he plans to become a unique live stage for artists of Southeast Asia. He also has plans for a Hollywood film telling the story of his personal life.

== Works ==
Vikrom Kromadit has written fifteen paper-back books. There are namely

1) Be a Better Man

2) Korrangsrangthurakit (business part)

3) Vikrom's Vision

4) World CEOs (Volume 1–9),

5) Fai Amata

6) Kin & Yu Baab Vikrom (Vikrom's life style) and

7) Cheevitmai (New life)

Simultaneously, he was also a columnist for Krungthep Turakij and Post Today newspapers and for several magazines. Moreover, he became a radio broadcaster in 2004 and began appearing on television on Channel 5 with "Through This World with Vikrom's Vision" in 2005. He plans to produce 20 books over the next 10 years.

== Television Program ==
Vikrom Version in Channel 3, started Monday 2 July 2012 and the program is in every Monday – Friday, Time 05:50- 05:55.

== Other sources ==
- เว็บไซต์ส่วนตัววิกรม กรมดิษฐ์
- Official Facebook Fanpage
