= Billy Ogan =

Thai actor and singer (born 1966)

- บิลลี่ มิตตกริน โอแกน
- Born: Billy Mittakarin Ogan; July 29, 1966 (age 59); Thailand
- Occupations: Actor; singer
- Years active: 1985–present
- Spouses: Sirium Pakdeedumrongrit (m. 1995; div. 2001) Nannaphat Thaiprasert (m. 2011)

Billy Mittakarin Ogan (Thai: บิลลี่ มิตตกริน โอแกน; born 29 July 1966) is a Thai actor and singer.

== Personal life ==
Ogan was born to a Filipino father and a Thai mother. He started his modeling career in 1985 and in 1987 he released his debut solo album "Billy Billy" on GMM Grammy. His second and third albums were more successful.

In 1995 he married actress Sirium Pakdeedumrongrit. They had one daughter before they divorced in 2001.

== Filmography ==
- 1988 Chalui
- 1995 Oh Mada
- 1996 Tong Nung 111
- 1998 Destiny Upside Down
- 1998 Khwamrak Kap Ngoentra (Love and Money)
- 2002 Sasan Khon Pen
- 2012 An Ordinary Love Story
- 2015 Tawan Tud Burapha
- 2018 Look Mai Lai Sontaya

== Concertography ==
- Amphol Meung Dee Gub Billy Khem 2005
- Micro: Rock Lek Lek RETURNs, 2010

== Awards and nominations ==
- Thailand National Film Association Awards - Best Supporting Actor Billy Ogan
- Cinemag Spirit Awards 2 - Best Supporting Actor Billy Ogan
