= Antoine Pinto =

French kickboxer (born 1993)

Antoine Siangboxing
- Born: Antoine Pinto; February 16, 1991 (age 35); Toulouse, France
- Other names: Dekschlam; Kid Shark; The Phenom; The Saint
- Nationality: French
- Height: 1.84 m (6 ft 1/2 in)
- Weight: 70 kg (154 lb; 11 st); 72.5 kg (160 lb; 11.42 st); 77 kg (170 lb; 12.1 st)
- Division: Welterweight
- Reach: 73.2 in (186 cm)
- Style: Muay Thai
- Fighting out of: Thailand
- Team: Siangboxing Gym - (PFS) Pinto Fight Studio / Bangkok
- Trainer: Saphanpetch Sit itsukato - Andrew Lanzkor - Thawisak Jaidee
- Years active: 2002–2017

Kickboxing record
- Total: 172
- Wins: 134
- By knockout: 78
- Losses: 37
- Draws: 1
- Last updated on: February 24, 2017

Antoine Pinto (born February 16, 1991), also known as Antoine Siangboxing, is a French former Muay Thai kickboxer who trains in Thailand.

Pinto is best known as the youngest foreign fighter to have competed at the prestigious Lumpinee Stadium at 14 and Rajadamnern Stadium at 15.

He has competed for the Thai Fight and Glory promotions.

== Biography and career ==
Antoine Siangboxing, nicknamed "The Phenom", was born as Antoine Pinto in Toulouse, France. Both of his parents are French. Antoine had his first fight at the age of 11. He was the youngest foreigner to have fought at Lumpinee Stadium at the age of 14 (2005) and is the youngest to have fought at Rajadamnern Stadium at the age of 15.

He defeated Farid Villaume by decision at Best of Siam 2 in Paris on November 22, 2012.

=== Thai Fight ===
He was set to fight Yodsanklai Fairtex at THAI FIGHT Extreme 2013: Bangkok in Bangkok, Thailand on June 29, 2013 but his opponent was changed to Tu Warren for unknown reasons. He beat Warren on points.

He TKO'd Dorian Price in round three at THAI FIGHT Extreme 2013: Pattani in Pattani, Thailand on September 22, 2013.

He outpointed Gustavo Mendes in a non-tournament affair at the opening round of the 2013 edition of Thai Fight's -70 kg/154 lb tournament in Thailand on October 23, 2013.

He beat Luca Novello by decision in a non-tournament match at the Thai Fight Semi-finals in Bangkok, Thailand on November 30, 2013.

He beat Eddie Vendetta by decision at THAI FIGHT World Battle 2014: Klai Kang Won in Hua Hin, Thailand on February 22, 2014.

On October 25, 2014, he defeated Michael Corley by TKO in the quarter-finals of the 2014 Thai Fight 72.5 kg King's Cup Tournament.

Pinto defeated Sen Buntheng by decision in the tournament semi-finals on November 22, 2014.

On December 21, 2014, Antoine Pinto faced Saiyok Pumpanmuang in the Thai Fight 72.5 kg Tournament Final, getting knocked down twice en route to a decision loss.

=== Glory ===
Antoine Pinto made his Glory debut on February 24, 2017, against Richard Abraham at Glory 38: Chicago. Pinto won by split decision.

Pinto was scheduled to face Casey Greene in the Glory Welterweight Contender Tournament Semi-final at Glory 44: Chicago. However, Greene withdrew from the fight and Pinto faced Zach Bunnell instead, winning by unanimous decision.

He went on to face Harut Grigorian in the Glory Welterweight Contender Tournament Final, losing by unanimous decision.

=== Post-fighting career ===
Since his loss to Grigorian, Pinto has not fought and it is assumed that Pinto has retired from active competition. In 2022, Antoine Pinto was introduced as one of three MCs on the newly launched Rajadamnern World Series promotion that took place at Rajadamnern Stadium.

== Titles and accomplishments ==
=== Titles ===
- GLORY
  - 2017 Glory 44 Welterweight 77 kg Contender Tournament Runner up (vs. Harut Grigorian)
- Thai Fight
  - 2016 Thai Fight 75 kg Superfight Champion (vs. Sudsakorn Sor Klinmee)
  - 2014 Thai Fight 72.5 kg Tournament Runner up. (vs. Saiyok Pumpanmuang)
- World Muaythai Council (WMC)
  - 2011 WMC I-1 World Grand Prix Champion (-66 kg)
  - 2010 WMC Middle East Champion Dubai, UAE
  - 2010 WMC I-1 Grand SLAM Super Fight Winner Hong Kong, China (-68 kg)
  - 2010 WMC I-1 Super Fight Winner Hong Kong, China (-66 kg)
  - 2007 WMC Vice Intercontinental Champion Astana, Kazakhstan (-65 kg)
- World Professional Muaythai Federation (WPMF)
  - 2011 WPMF World Super Welterweight Muaythai Champion (-70 kg / 154 lbs)
- Toyota Marathon
  - 2011 Toyota Cup Marathon - Thailand 72 kg (semi-finalist)
- The Challenger Muaythai
  - 2011 The Challenger Muaythai - Malaysia (semi-finalist)
- The Contender Asia
  - 2009 Contender Asia France Runner Up (-71 kg) Paris
- World Association of Kickboxing Organizations (WAKO)
  - 2009 WAKO Pro European Thaiboxing Champion (-71 kg)
- Golden Belt (United Kingdom)
  - 2008 Golden Belt World Champion - Liverpool United Kingdom
  - 2008 Golden Belt Superfight Champion Liverpool (147 lbs)
- King's Cup Malaysia
  - 2008 King's Cup Malaysia Champion Kheda (Malaysia)
- Lyon Fights
  - 2007 Lyons Fights Winner (-145 lbs) Thailand
- X-One Championship
  - 2006 X-One Belt Champion Thailand (-127 lbs)
- Thailand Regional
  - 2005 South Thailand Provinces Belt Thailand (-125 lbs)
- Awards:
  - 2007 Best Wai Khru in Lumpinee Stadium, Channel 5
  - Ranked Top 05 in Supreme Striking 155 Lbs
  - Ranked Top 10 in WBC 154 Lbs
  - Ranked Top 10 in Lumpinee stadium 154 lbs
  - Ranked Top 10 in Siam Omnoi stadium 154 lbs
  - Ranked Top 10 in GLORY kickboxing 77 kg

== Muay Thai record ==
Professional Kickboxing Record
134 Wins (77 (T)KO's), 37 Losses, 1 Draw, No Contest
| Date | Result | Opponent | Event | Location | Method | Round | Time |
| 2017-08-25 | Loss | (Armenia) Harut Grigorian | Glory 44: Chicago Welterweight Contender Tournament, Final - 77 kg | Chicago, United States | Decision | 3 | 3:00 |
| 2017-08-25 | Win | (United States) Zach Bunnell | Glory 44: Chicago Welterweight Contender Tournament, Semi-final - 77 kg | Chicago, United States | Unanimous Decision | 3 | 3:00 |
| 2017-04-08 | Win | (Turkey) Aydin Tunkay | THAI FIGHT Paris - 77 kg | Paris, France | Unanimous Decision | 3 | 3:00 |
| 2017-02-24 | Win | (United States) Richard Abraham | Glory 38: Chicago - 77 kg | Chicago, United States | Decision | 3 | 3:00 |
| 2016-12-24 | Win | (Thailand) Sudsakorn Sor Klinmee | THAI FIGHT The Fighter King - 75 kg/ | Bangkok, Thailand | Decision (Unanimous) | 4 | 3:00 |
| 2016-11-19 | Win | (Morocco) Ilyass Chakir | THAI FIGHT AIR RACE 1 – 75 kg/ | Rayong, Thailand | Decision (Unanimous) | 3 | 3:00 |
| 2016-09-11 | Win | (England) Artur Saladiak | THAI FIGHT London -75 kg/ | London, England | Decision (Unanimous) | 3 | 3:00 |
| 2016-08-20 | Win | (Turkey) Ayhan Isik | THAI FIGHT KMITL - 75 kg/ | Bangkok, Thailand | TKO | 2 | 3:00 |
| 2016-07-23 | Win | (Italy) Anouar Khamlali | THAI FIGHT Proud to Be Thai 2016 -75 kg/ | Bangkok, Thailand | Decision (Unanimous) | 3 | 3:00 |
| 2015-12-31 | Loss | (Thailand) Eakchanachai Kaewsamrit | THAI FIGHT Count Down | Bangkok, Thailand | Decision | 3 | 3:00 |
| 2015-11-21 | Win | (United States) Malik Watson | THAI FIGHT RPCA - 72.5 kg | Nakhon Pathom, Thailand | Winner by KO round 02 (Elbow) | 2 | 3:00 |
| 2015-10-25 | Win | (Germany) Pascal Schroth | THAI FIGHT Proud to Be Thai: Vietnam - 72.5 kg | Ho Chi Minh City, Vietnam | Decision (Unanimous) | 3 | 3:00 |
| 2015-08-22 | Win | (England) Charlie Guest | THAI FIGHT Proud to Be Thai: Narathiwat - 72.5 kg | Narathiwat, Thailand | Decision (Unanimous) | 3 | 3:00 |
| 2015-05-02 | Win | (Brazil) Matheus Pereira | THAI FIGHT Samui 2015 – 72 kg | Ko Samui, Thailand | DQ | 1 | 3:00 |
| 2015-04-04 | Win | (Australia) Bruce Macfie | THAI FIGHT CRMA - 72 kg | Nakhon Nayok, Thailand | TKO (Knee) | 2 | 3:00 |
| 2014-12-21 | Loss | (Thailand) Saiyok Pumpanmuang | Thai Fight 2014 - 72.5 kg Tournament Final | Bangkok, Thailand | Decision | 3 | 3:00 |
| 2014-11-22 | Win | (Cambodia) Sen Buntheng | Thai Fight 2014 - 72.5 kg Tournament Semi-final | Khon Kaen, Thailand | Decision (Unanimous) | 3 | 3:00 |
| 2014-10-25 | Win | (United States) Michael Corley | Thai Fight 2014 - 72.5 kg Tournament Quarter-final | Bangkok, Thailand | TKO (Elbow) | 3 | 3:00 |
| 2014-09-20 | Win | (Albania) Eduart Pachi | THAI FIGHT World Battle 2014: Vietnam- 72 kg/160 lb | Ho Chi Minh City, Vietnam | Decision (Unanimous) | 3 | 3:00 |
| 2014-08-16 | Win | (Cambodia) Sen Buntheng | THAI FIGHT World Battle 2014: Nakhon Sawan - 72 kg/160 lb | Nakhon Sawan, Thailand | Decision (Unanimous) | 3 | 3:00 |
| 2014-06-28 | Win | (Hong Kong) Zidong Zhu | THAI FIGHT World Battle 2014: Macao - 72 kg/160 lb | Macau, China | KO | 1 | 3:00 |
| 2014-04-06 | Win | (United Kingdom) Alan Ryan | THAI FIGHT World Battle 2014: Chakrinaruebet -72 kg/160 lb | Sattahip, Thailand | TKO | 2 | 3:00 |
| 2014-02-22 | Win | (Colombia) Eddie Vendetta | THAI FIGHT World Battle 2014: Klai Kang Won -72 kg/160 lb | Hua Hin, Thailand | Decision (Unanimous) | 3 | 3:00 |
| 2013-12-22 | Win | (Italy) Sharos Huyer | Thai Fight 2013 – 72 kg/160 lb Tournament | Bangkok, Thailand | Decision (Unanimous) | 3 | 3:00 |
| 2013-11-30 | Win | (Italy) Lucas Novello | Thai Fight 2013 – 70 kg/154 lb Tournament | Bangkok, Thailand | Decision (Unanimous) | 3 | 3:00 |
| 2013-10-23 | Win | (Brazil) Gustavo Mendes | Thai Fight 2013 – 70 kg/154 lb Tournament | Bangkok, Thailand | Decision (Unanimous) | 3 | 3:00 |
| 2013-09-22 | Win | (United States) Dorian Price | THAI FIGHT Extreme 2013: Pattani | Pattani, Thailand | TKO (left low kick) | 3 | 3:00 |
| 2013-06-29 | Win | (United States) Tu Warren | THAI FIGHT Extreme 2013: Bangkok | Bangkok, Thailand | Decision (Unanimous) | 3 | 3:00 |
| 2012-11-22 | Win | (France) Farid Villaume | Best of Siam 2 | Paris, France | Decision (Unanimous) | 5 | 3:00 |
| 2012-06-23 | Loss | (Thailand) Eakchanachai Kaewsamrit | Weber Tournament 67 kg, Siam Omnoi Stadium | Bangkok, Thailand | Decision | 5 | 3:00 |
| 2012-05-12 | Loss | (Thailand) Dernchonlek Sor. Sor. Niyom | Weber Tournament 67 kg, Siam Omnoi Stadium | Bangkok, Thailand | TKO | 4 | 3:00 |
| 2012-03-17 | Win | (Thailand) Thepsutin Phumpanmuang | CH 11 Fights-Imperial Ladphrao Stadium | Bangkok, Thailand | KO (Knee) | 4 | 3:00 |
| 2011-10-28 | Loss | (Thailand) Yodsanklai Fairtex | Toyota Cup Marathon 72 kg, Semi Finals | Korat, Thailand | Split Decision | 3 | 2:00 |
| 2011-10-28 | Win | (Iran) Ali Muchavi | Toyota Cup Marathon 72 kg, Quarter Finals | Korat, Thailand | Decision (Unanimous) | 3 | 2:00 |
| 2011-11-07 | Loss | (Thailand) Tum Mardsua | The Challenger Muaythai, Semi Finals | Kuala Lumpur, Malaysia | KO | 2 | |
| 2011-11-03 | Win | (Malaysia) Faizal Ramli | The Challenger Muaythai, Quarter Finals | Kuala Lumpur, Malaysia | TKO | 5 | 3:00 |
| 2011-09-17 | Win | (Israel) Ilya Grad | The Challenger Muaythai, Opening Round | Kuala Lumpur, Malaysia | Decision (Unanimous) | 5 | 3:00 |
| 2011-07-23 | Win | (Thailand) Saenchainoi Pumphanmuang | Thailand Versus Challenger Series 2011 | Bangkok, Thailand | Decision (Unanimous) | 5 | 3:00 |
| 2011-04-21 | Win | (Australia) Kurt Finlayson | W.M.C. I-1 World GP '11, Final | Hong Kong, China | Decision (Split) | 3 | 3:00 |
Wins W.M.C. I-1 World Muaythai Grand Prix 2011 tournament title -66 kg.
| 2011-04-21 | Win | (Slovakia) Vladimir Konsky | W.M.C. I-1 World GP '11, Semi Finals | Hong Kong, China | Decision (Split) | 3 | 3:00 |
| 2011-04-21 | Win | (Denmark) Rhassan Muhareb | W.M.C. I-1 World GP '11, Quarter Finals | Hong Kong, China | Decision (Unanimous) | 3 | 3:00 |
| 2011-03-05 | Loss | (Thailand) Nopparat Keatkhamtorn | Siam Omnoi Stadium - Channel 3 | Bangkok, Thailand | Decision | 5 | 3:00 |
| 2011-01-21 | Win | (Thailand) Bovy Sor Udomson | Channel 3 | Supanburi, Thailand | Decision (Unanimous) | 5 | 3:00 |
Wins W.P.M.F. World Super Welterweight Muaythai title (-70 kg / 154 lbs).
| 2010-12-05 | Loss | (England) Jordan Watson | King's Birthday 2010, Quarter Final | Bangkok, Thailand | Decision (Split) | 3 | 2:00 |
| 2010-11-25 | Win | (Croatia) Zidov Dominik | War on the Shore 3 | Dubai, UAE | Decision (Unanimous) | 5 | 3:00 |
Wins WMC Middle East title.
| 2010-11-22 | Win | (Thailand) Lerm Ratchakhom | WMC I-1 World Muaythai Grand SLAM 2010 | Hong Kong, China | Decision (Unanimous) | 5 | 3:00 |
| 2010-10-29 | Loss | (Thailand) Eakpracha Meenayothin | Toyota Marathon 154 lb, Semi Final | Udon Thani, Thailand | Decision | 5 | 3:00 |
| 2010-10-29 | Win | (Germany) Denis Oliwka | Toyota Marathon 154 lb, Quarter Final | Udon Thani, Thailand | TKO | 2 | 3:00 |
| 2010-08-20 | Loss | (Thailand) Hokfut | S1 Belt Championships, Semi Final | Pattaya, Thailand | TKO (Low Kick) | 3 | 3:00 |
| 2010-08-20 | Win | (Brazil) Igor Pedote | S1 Belt Championships, Quarter Final | Pattaya, Thailand | TKO | 2 | 3:00 |
| 2010-08-12 | Loss | (Thailand) Saiyok Pumpanmuang | Thailand vs Challenger Onesongchai Series | Bangkok, Thailand | Decision (Unanimous) | 5 | 3:00 |
| 2010-05-20 | Win | (Thailand) Noppakaw Sor Wanchart | I-1 World Muaythai Super Fights | Hong Kong, China | Decision (Unanimous) | 5 | 3:00 |
Wins I-1 Super Fight Belt(-66 kg).
| 2010-05-12 | Loss | (Thailand) Moset Sor Sienkiengnoi | S1 World Championship | Thailand | Decision | 5 | 3:00 |
Fight was for S1 World title (165 lbs).
| 2010-03-23 | Loss | (Thailand) Santichai Or Boonchauy | I-1 World Title Super 8, Semi Final | Hong Kong, China | Decision (Unanimous) | 3 | 3:00 |
| 2010-03-23 | Win | (Sweden) Peyman Shahrokni | I-1 World Title Super 8, Quarter Final | Hong Kong, China | Decision (Split) | 3 | 3:00 |
| 2010-01-16 | Loss | (Thailand) Nopparat Keatkhamtorn | Thailand vs Challenger Series | Bangkok, Thailand | Decision (Split) | 5 | 3:00 |
| 2009-00-00 | Win | (Thailand) Adun Noi Sit Benjama | Onesongchai Promotion | Bangkok, Thailand | KO | 4 | 3:00 |
| 2009-11-27 | Loss | (Thailand) Sapapet Sor Sakaopet | Toyota Vigo Cup | Bangkok, Thailand | Decision (Split) | 3 | 3:00 |
| 2009-11-07 | Loss | (Thailand) Tum Madsua | I-1 Grand Extreme 2009 - Asian Title, Semi Final | Macau, China | Decision (Unanimous) | 3 | 3:00 |
| 2009-09-15 | Win | (Thailand) Sapapet Sor Sakaopet | Lumpinee Stadium | Bangkok, Thailand | TKO | 3 | 3:00 |
| 2009-08-07 | Win | (Netherlands) Bobey Sor Vorapin | Lumpinee Stadium | Bangkok, Thailand | TKO | 3 | 3:00 |
| 2009-06-26 | Loss | (France) Sofian Seboussi | Gala International Multi-Boxes | Paris, France | Decision | 5 | 3:00 |
| 2009-05-02 | Win | (France) Mourad Bourachid | WAKO Pro European Championship | Epinal, France | TKO (Elbow/Cut) | 4 | 3:00 |
Wins WAKO Pro European Muaythai title (71 kg).
| 2009-04-11 | Loss | (France) Mourad Bourachid | La Nuit des Boxeurs Thai | Brest, France | Decision (Split) | 5 | 3:00 |
| 2009-03-20 | Loss | (France) Cédric Muller | Contenders Asia French Selection, Final | Paris, France | Decision (Unanimous) | 3 | 3:00 |
Fight was for Contender Asia French Selection title and qualification.
| 2009-03-20 | Win | (France) Nicolas Germain | Contender Asia French Selection, Semi Final | Paris, France | Decision (Unanimous) | 3 | 3:00 |
| 2009-03-20 | Win | (France) Salahdine Ait Naceur | Contender Asia French Selection, Quarter Final | Paris, France | Decision (Unanimous) | 3 | 3:00 |
| 2009-00-00 | Loss | (Thailand) Wutthichai Sor Tuptimsakesan | Z1 World muaythai series Malaysia | Malaysia | Split Decision | 3 | 3:00 |
| 2009-01-16 | Win | (France) Mica Virapol | Lumpinee Stadium | Bangkok, Thailand | TKO | 2 | 3:00 |
| 2008-11-08 | Draw | (England) Liam Robinson | Golden Belt in UK | Liverpool, England | Draw | 5 | 3:00 |
| 2008-08-22 | Loss | (Hong Kong) Bill Chong | Libogen Fight Night VII | Hong Kong, China | Split Decision | 3 | 3:00 |
| 2008-05-10 | Win | (Netherlands) Robin van Roosmalen | Golden Belt Super Fight | Liverpool, England | Unanimous Decision | 5 | 3:00 |
| 2008-03-14 | Loss | (Thailand) Tantawan Sor Borwornrat | Lumpinee Stadium | Bangkok, Thailand | Decision | 5 | 3:00 |
| 2008-04-26 | Win | (Thailand) Kangpeth | Lumpinee Stadium | Bangkok, Thailand | KO | 1 | 3:00 |
| 2008-00-00 | Win | (Thailand) Thongpeth Sor Sitpeth | Lumpinee Stadium | Bangkok, Thailand | KO | 3 | 3:00 |
| 2008-00-00 | Win | (Thailand) Saksit Chopaksit | Kings Cup - Kheda | Malaysia | TKO (Cut) | 2 | 3:00 |
| 2007-11-03 | Loss | (Thailand) Aphisak KT.Gym | Muaythai Lumpinee Krikkrai Fights | Bangkok, Thailand | TKO | 4 | |
| 2007-09-29 | Win | (Japan) Abbe Mishihito | Petchyindee Promotion, Lumpinee Stadium | Bangkok, Thailand | TKO (Elbow) | 1 | 3:00 |
| 2007-09-02 | Win | (Thailand) Neug Samchai | Phattalung Stadium | Thailand | TKO (Elbow) | 3 | 3:00 |
| 2007-00-00 | Win | (Thailand) Yod Narrong | Lumpinee Stadium | Bangkok, Thailand | KO | 1 | 3:00 |
| 2007-06-30 | Win | (Thailand) Jarenthon Por Sitphet | Lumpinee Stadium | Bangkok, Thailand | TKO (Elbow) | 5 | 3:00 |
| 2007-05-05 | Win | (Thailand) Thonpeth Sor Sitpeth | Lumpinee Stadium | Bangkok, Thailand | KO | 3 | 3:00 |
| 2007-03-22 | Loss | (Kazakhstan) Amirbayev Dauren | WMC Championship | Astana, Kazakhstan | Decision | 5 | 3:00 |
Fight was for WMC Intercontinental title (-65 kg).
| 2007-00-00 | Win | (Thailand) Superboy Noi | Waisak Fights | Thailand | TKO (Referee Stoppage) | 1 | 3:00 |
| 2007-00-00 | Win | (Thailand) Chokchaikun | Hua Hin Arena Boxing Stadium | Thailand | TKO (Referee Stoppage) | 2 | 3:00 |
| 2007-00-00 | Win | (Thailand) Nompakrao | Bangsaphan | Thailand | TKO (Referee Stoppage) | 2 | 3:00 |
| 2007-00-00 | Win | (Thailand) Praek Phathalung | Pimai Muaythai fights | Amphoe Khuan Khanun | TKO | 3 | 3:00 |
| 2007-00-00 | Win | (Thailand) Chai Narrong | Hua Hin Arena Boxing Stadium | Khuan Khanun | TKO | 2 | 3:00 |
| 2006-08-27 | Win | (Sweden) Malick Bah | Rajadamnern Stadium | Bangkok, Thailand | TKO (Dislocated shoulder) | 3 | 3:00 |
| 2006-06-24 | Loss | (Thailand) Boondong Tor Phonchai | P.Pramuk Fights, Lumpinee Stadium | Bangkok, Thailand | Decision | 5 | 3:00 |
| 2006-06-21 | Win | (Canada) Michael Yang | Rajadamnern Stadium | Bangkok, Thailand | TKO (Cut) | 4 | 3:00 |
| 2006-02-25 | Loss | (Thailand) Rukkard S.Mardnarong | P.Pramuk Fights, Lumpinee Stadium | Bangkok, Thailand | Decision | 5 | 3:00 |
| 2006-02-13 | Win | (Thailand) Nazee Tiger Gym | International Lyons Fights | Thailand | KO | 2 | 3:00 |
| 2006-01-14 | Win | (Thailand) Yodnarong V.P.Udon | P.Pramuk Fights, Lumpinee Stadium | Bangkok, Thailand | TKO | 1 | |
| 2006-01-01 | Win | (Thailand) Khadam Death Paifa | Pimai Muaythai fights | Prachuap Khiri Khan | KO | 4 | 3:00 |
| 2005-12-22 | Win | (Thailand) Boondung Tor Phonchai | X-One Championship | Thailand | KO | 2 | 3:00 |
Wins X-One Belt (-127 lbs).
| 2005-11-22 | Win | (Thailand) Fouloung Pathongpong | Por Pramuk Fights, Lumpinee Stadium | Bangkok, Thailand | KO | 2 | 3:00 |
| 2005-10-08 | Loss | (Thailand) Phetnarong S.Mongkonked | P.Pramuk Fights, Lumpinee Stadium | Bangkok, Thailand | TKO | 1 | |
| 2005-09-09 | Win | (Thailand) Kingtong Pathongpong | Por Pramuk Fights, Lumpinee Stadium | Bangkok, Thailand | KO | 2 | 3:00 |
| 2005-06-19 | Win | (Thailand) Songkhamchai | Big Buddhas Temple in Bangkhrut | Thailand | KO | 1 | 3:00 |
Wins South Thailand Province Belt (-125 lbs).
| 2004-00-00 | Win | (Thailand) Nongmai | Muaythai in southern Thailand | Thailand | KO (Knee) | 4 | 3:00 |
| 2004-10-14 | Win | (Thailand) Chokchaicun | Hua Hin Arena Stadium | Thailand | KO | 3 | 3:00 |
| 2004-08-21 | Win | (Thailand) Nopakhao | Bangsaphan Stadium | Thailand | KO | 1 | 3:00 |
Legend: Win Loss Draw/No contest Notes

== See also ==
- List of male kickboxers
