= Porjade Kaenpetch =

- พอเจตน์ แก่นเพชร
- Born: Porjade Kaenpetch; 19 July 1948 (age 78); Bangkok, Thailand
- Occupation: Actor
- Years active: 1977–present
- Known for: Chai Klang from Ban Sai Thong (1980) and Pojamarn Sawangwong (1981)
- Awards: Mekhala Award (1996)

Porjade Kaenpetch (Thai: พอเจตน์ แก่นเพชร; born July 19, 1948) is a Thai actor, best known for the 1979 film adaptation of Ban Sai Thong

== Career ==
He made his film debut in Roi Likhit (รอยลิขิต – Fated Destiny) in 1977, alongside Ampa Phusit and Supphansa Nuengphiraph. The film was neither a failure nor a major success. He subsequently had the opportunity to star in Ban Sai Thong (บ้านทรายทอง – Golden Sand House), based on the novel of the same title by Ko Surangkhanang, playing M.R. Paradapatrapee Sawangwong, also known as Chai Klang, the male lead opposite superstar actress Jarunee Suksawat. Produced by Five Star Production, the film was a major success and made the character of Chai Klang so closely associated with him that the image stayed with him. The following year, he reprised the role in the sequel, Pojamarn Sawangwong, which proved to be even more successful.

He has appeared in approximately 100 films. In 1985, he turned to television, making his television debut in the Channel 7 drama Massaya (มัสยา – Ichthy), which starred Sarunyoo Wongkrachang as the lead. He then disappeared from the entertainment industry for more than a decade, devoting himself to his own agricultural business in the provinces. He eventually returned to acting, primarily in supporting roles.

His later credits include the Channel 7 drama Dome Thong (โดมทอง – Golden Dome) in 2013, in which he appeared as a guest actor, and the 2023 supernatural horror film Death Whisperer, in which he played Mr. Phut, or Uncle Phut, an elderly man dressed entirely in white who possesses magical knowledge and is the only person in the film capable of confronting the black-clad female demon.

== Family life ==
Kaenpetch has been married twice. He has one child with his first wife and later remarried his current wife, who is 10 years younger than him.
