= Art Supawatt Purdy =

- ศุภวัฒน์ อ่ำประสิทธิ์
- Born: Supawatt Aumprasit; 1 September 1974 (age 52); Bangkok, Thailand
- Other names: Art Supawatt; Art Purdy; Supawatt Aumprasit; Art (อาร์ท)
- Education: Bachelor of Science in Industrial Engineering, Florida State University
- Occupations: Actor; Singer; Television Presenter; YouTuber
- Years active: 1994–present
- Known for: Sapan Dao (TV miniseries) (1999); Soi Cowboy Motion Picture Soundtrack (2008); Sarawat Yai (2019); Art of Love (Album/CD) (2003)
- Height: 1.83 m (6 ft 0 in)
- Musical career
- Genres: Pop; Rock; Latin
- Label: Warner Music Thailand
- Website: Official website

Art Supawatt Purdy (born Supawatt Aumprasit (Thai: ศุภวัฒน์ อ่ำประสิทธิ์), on September 1, 1974, in Bangkok, Thailand) is a Thai-American actor, singer, and television host. Fluent in both English and Thai, Purdy starred in several Thai language television mini-series (lakhon) before starting his singing career in 2003.

== Early life and education ==
At the age of 14, Purdy moved to America to live with his parents in Fort Walton Beach, Florida enrolling at Fort Walton Beach High School and then Florida State University completing a Bachelor of Science degree in Industrial Engineering. He then enrolled in a master's course with the ambition of joining NASA. However, in the second semester, he left his course and heeded a friend's advice to try modelling in New York City and signed to Storm Model Management. He has described his time in New York City as 'the time of my life' and 'appearing in Vogue' as the proudest moment in his life.

At the end of 1995, after being told of modelling opportunities in Thailand, he returned there and began modelling for magazines, runways and commercials. His break came in 1997 when he was chosen for a TV commercial for 'Hunter Whiskey'.

== Career ==
His first acting role was in a feature film called Suea Chon Phan Suea in 1998. He followed this with the leading role in three television mini-series in 1999 called Petch Ta Maeow (Thai: เพชรตาแมว), Sapan Dao (Thai: สะพานดาว) and Peang Kare Jai Rao Rak Gun (Thai: เพียงแค่ใจเรารักกัน).

In 2003, he signed a recording contract with Warner Music Thailand and released his first solo album Art of Love. After the launch of his CD, Purdy quit acting and began performing for Thai fans in cities around the world in many series of concert tours to Japan, USA and Europe.

In 2008, Purdy recorded three new songs, a cover version of a Southern gospel classic and two re-recorded new versions of the songs from his album Art of Love, to be included in the soundtrack of English Director Thomas Clay's film Soi Cowboy. The three new tracks included the theme song Where We'll Never Grow Old (Never Grow Old), an uptempo version of Yaak Euie Wa Ruk (Thai: อยากเอ่ยว่ารัก) and a live-like recording of Yar Ton Eak Leoy (Thai: อย่าทนอีกเลย). At the 61st Cannes film festival, Soi Cowboy was selected for Un Certain Regard Award consideration, and for his effort on the soundtrack, Purdy received the same honor in the music category.

In 2016, after almost 14 years absence from television, Purdy returned to primetime playing a treasure hunter with paranoid schizophrenia in the mini-series Thong Sip directed by Chalong Pakdeevijit. Since then, Purdy acted in all of the mini-series directed by Chalong Pakdeevijit, namely Tulip Thong (2017), Por Ta Peun Toe, Part 2 (2018), Skyraider (2021) and Kan Song Pandin (2023).

In 2019, Purdy reunited with the director who gave him his first leading role in Petch Ta Maeow, Nirattisai Kaljaruek, in the remake of the 1989 controversial mini-series called Sarawat Yai. Based on a true story of a real life Thai policeman, Sarawat Yai marked the first time Purdy has played the role of a leading villain, the corrupted Pol Maj Gen Anek. His performance earned him the Nagaraj Awards for Best Multitalented Actor of the Year (2019).

== Filmography ==
=== Film ===
Year	Work	Role	Distributed by	Notes	Ref.
1998	Crime Kings (Suea Chon Phan Suea)	Suea Pao	Five Star Production		
2008	Soi Cowboy	Himself	De Warren Pictures	Un Certain Regard Selection Credited as Music by Art Supawatt	
2012	The Mark	Jock	Pure Flix Entertainment		

=== Television ===
Year	Title	English Title	Role	With	Channel	Note
1999	Petch Ta Maeow (Thai: เพชรตาแมว)	"DiamondEye Cat"	Captain Khongyot	Worarat Suwannarat	CH 5	Leading role
1999	Sapan Dao (Thai: สะพานดาว)	"Starbridge"	Chak	Sririta Jensen	CH 7	Leading role
1999	Peang Kare Jai Rao Rak Gun (Thai: เพียงแค่ใจเรารักกัน)		Nitti	Nusaba Wanichangkul (Noos)	CH 5	Leading role
2000	Khu Rak Khu Rob (Thai: คู่รัก คู่รบ)			Claudia Chakrapan	CH 5	Leading role
2000	Hua Jai Song Park (Thai: หัวใจสองภาค)		Don	Sara Malakul Lane	CH 7	Leading role
2000	Sano Ban Chao Khadkhao Ban Yen (Thai: โสนบานเช้า คัดเค้าบานเย็น)			Ann Siream	CH 7	Leading role
2001	Fai Kammathep (Thai: ไฟกามเทพ)	"Fire of Desire"	Kenneth	Kullasatree Siripongpreeda	CH 3	Leading role
2002	Khon Rerng Muang (Thai: คนเริงเมือง)		Bunchuai	Mai Charoenpura	CH 5	Leading role
2016	Thong Sip (Thai: ทอง 10)	"Gold 10"	John		CH 7	Supporting role
2017	Tulip Thong (Thai: ทิวลิปทอง)	"Goldentulip"	Marko		CH 7	Uncredited cameo
2018	Por Ta Peun Toh 2 (Thai: พ่อตาปืนโต 2: หลานข้าใครอย่าแตะ)	"The Big Gun"	Mr. John		CH 7	
2019	Sarawat Yai (Thai: สารวัตรใหญ่)	"The Law Enforcement"	Pol.Maj.Gen. Anake		CH 7	
2020	Khon Nuea Khon (Thai: คนเหนือฅน)	"Topman"	Michael		CH 7	
2020	Sombat Mahaheng (Thai: สมบัติมหาเฮง)	"The Lost Treasure"	John		CH 7	
2021	Plone Loy Fha (Thai: ปล้นลอยฟ้า)	"Skyraider"	Mr. Lucky		CH 7	
2022	Hoop Phaya Suea (Thai: หุบพญาเสือ)	"Outlaw Justice"	Carter		CH 7	Premieres Apr. 8, 2022
2023	Kan Song Pandin (Thai: แคนสองแผ่นดิน)	"The Mekong Connection"	Mark		CH 7	
2024	Morakod Si Rung (Thai: มรกตสีรุ้ง)	"The Deadly Emerald"	Dr. Ford		CH 7	Premiering 08/22/24
2026	Pleng Rak Payak Rai (Thai: เพลงรักพยัคฆ์ร้าย)	"The Rhythm of Revenge"	Kitti		CH 7	
