= Louis Hesse d'Alzon =

- หลุยส์ เฮสดาร์ซัน
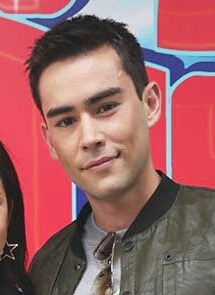
- Born: 2 May 1991 (age 35); Bangkok, Thailand
- Other names: Louis (หลุยส์); Louis Hesse (หลุยส์ เฮส)
- Education: Bachelor of Mass Communication, Ramkhamhaeng International Institute
- Occupation: Actor
- Years active: 2008–present
- Known for: Nak Soo Maha Gaan (2013); Hak Lin Chang (2017); Mekong (2023–24)
- Height: 185 cm (6 ft 1 in)

Louis Hesse d'Alzon (Thai: หลุยส์ เฮสดาร์ซัน), sometimes abbreviated as Louis Hesse (หลุยส์ เฮส, born May 2, 1991, in Bangkok) is a Thai-French actor who is affiliated with Channel 7 HD.

== Career ==
Hesse d'Alzon began entering the showbiz as an actor in 2008, having featured in Kamikaze's MV in 2010.

In the same year, he had the opportunity to star in the role of Johnny in the teen musical film After School.

In 2013, he signed with Ch7, starting to gain recognition. In the beginning, the characters he received were usually only supporting roles or villains. He made his first protagonist in Hak Lin Chang in 2017, alongside a Thai-Austrian actress Stephany Auernig.

In November 2023, Hesse d'Alzon starred as Johnny Draco, an American martial arts and weapons expert, in Mekong, an adaptation of the 1995 novel of the same name by former politician and writer Pongpol Adireksarn. He is a main character with Mik Thongraya.

== Personal life ==
Hesse d'Alzon was born in Bangkok to French father and Thai mother. His mother is a single mom because his father died when Hesse d'Alzon was a child.

He graduated with a bachelor's degree from Faculty of Liberal Arts (major Mass Communication Arts), Ramkhamhaeng International Institute in 2016.

He was conscripted into the military after he graduated.

== Filmography ==
Films
Year	Title	Role	Notes	Notes #2	With
2010	After School	Johnny	Supporting Role	Debut film	

== Television ==
=== TV series ===
Year	Title	Role	Network
2013	Nak Soo Maha Gaan	Guest role	Ch7
2014	Lah Ruk Sut Kob Fah	Prince Makee	Ch7
2015	Koo Hoo Koo Hean 2	Chol	Ch7

== MC ==
- 2021: 26th Asian Television Awards
- 2024: 28th Asian Television Awards
