= Tussaneeya Karnsomnut =

Thai model and actress

- ทัศนียา การสมนุช
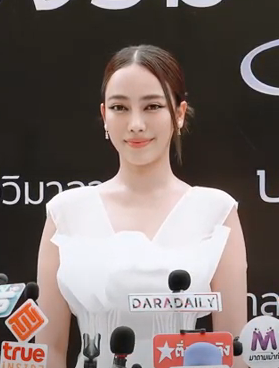
- Born: Tussaneeya Karnsomnut; December 14, 1994 (age 31); Pak Kret, Nonthaburi
- Other name: Preaw
- Occupations: Actress; model; MC; YouTuber
- Years active: 2012–present
- Agent: Channel 7 (2012–present)
- Notable work: Mae Poo Preaw (2012); Morrasoom Sawad (2015)
- Height: 1.73 m (5 ft 8 in)

Tussaneeya Karnsomnut (Thai: ทัศนียา การสมนุช, RTGS: Thatsaniya Kansomnut; born 14 December 1994), who goes by the nickname Preaw (Thai: เปรี้ยว, RTGS: Priao), is a Thai model and actress.

== Early life and education ==
Tussaneeya was born on December 14, 1994, graduating from high school from Satree Nonthaburi School Tussaneeya is a child of school activities. Have special talents such as Thai dancing and melodious singing Tussaneeya began her career in the industry by shooting in magazines. Currently, Tussaneeya graduated with a bachelor's degree from the Faculty of Communication Arts. PhD Bangkok University

== Career ==
Tussaneeya is signed under Channel 7, her first lakorn was Mae Poo Preaw in 2012 with Auan Rangsit Sirananon. In 2013 she was cast for drama Dome Thong as Wirongrong and Plubpleung where she is paired with Vee Veraparb Suparbpaiboon . She played 2 roles for this drama. In 2014 she had acted in three dramas, Leh Nang Hon, Kom Paya Bath and Prai Payakorn. In 2016, she was paired with Weir Sukollawat Kanarot for drama Morrasoom Sawaat where she played character Kumarika. In 2017 she played 2 drama Plerng Pranang and Wang Nang Hong. She won Best Supporting Actress for her role in Plerng Pranang as Jao Sao Pinmanee. For the drama Wang Nang Hong she is paired with Cee Siwat Chottichaicharin.

In 2018, she once again paired with Vee Veraparb Suparbpaiboon and Bank Artit Tangwiboonpanit for drama Rabum Marn. She was paired with Es Kantapong Bamrongrak for drama Sarawat Yai in 2019. She once again paired with Es Kantapong Bamrongrak for drama Lah Tah Chon in 2020. She is paired with BigM Krittarit Butprohm back to back for two drama, Pleng Ruk Pleng Bpeun and Peek Hong both for 2019 and 2020. She currently filming her upcoming drama Mekong where she will act with Mick Tongraya. She also will star along with Thisa Varitthisa Limthammahisorn and Phattharapon Dejpongwaranon for a drama name Le Rai Game Luang.

== Filmography ==
=== Television series ===
Year	Title	Role	Network
2012	Mae Poo Preaw	Poo	Ch7
2013	Dome Tong	Wirongrong (present)/Plubpleung (past)	Ch7
2014	Leh Nang Hong	Mattana (Manow)	Ch7
2014	Kom Payabaht	Kanya (Pia)	Ch7
2014	Prai Payakorn	Pichasinee (Pi)	Ch7
2015-16	Morrasoom Sawad	Kumarika (Kwang)	Ch7
2017	Plerng Pranang	Jao Nang Pinmanee	Ch7
2017	Wang Nang Hong	Phikul	Ch7
2018	Rabum Marn	Tawika	Ch7
2019	Sarawat Yai	Kampaeng	Ch7
2019	Pleng Ruk Pleng Bpeun	Priew	Ch7
2020	Peek Hong	Linin / (Nin)	Ch7
2020	Lah Tah Chon	Natasha	Ch7
2022	Buang Wimala	Onpeeya	Ch7
2023	Mekong	Dr Kimmy	Ch7
Upcoming	Le Rai Game Luang	Ingdao	Ch7

== MC ==
=== Television ===
- 20 : ทุกวัน เวลา น.-น. On Air () ร่วมกับ

=== Online ===
- 2021 : PREAWWNP - EP.0 On Air YouTuber:Preawwnp

== Discography ==
=== Drama Ost ===
Year	Song title	Drama
2012	เผลอรัก / Pler Ruk	Mae Poo Priew
2012	เพลง แม่ปูเปรี้ยว / Mae Poo Priew ( duet with Rangsit Sirananon)	Mae Poo Priew
2013	รักนิรันดร์ / Ruk Nirun	Dome Thong
2015	เธอคือมรสุม / Tur Keu Mornsoom	Morasoom Sawaat
2017	เพราะข้าจะตาม / Pror Kaa Ja Dtaam	Wang Nang Hong
2019	ลอยมา ลอยไป / Loi Ma, Loi Pai (duet with Thanakorn Sribanjong)	Pleng Ruk Pleng Bpeun
2020	เธอคือรักแท้ / Teu Keu Rak Tae	Peek Hong
2020	แสงสว่าง / Saeng Sawaang Haeng Ruk	Lah Tah Chon
