= Phleng Rak Pha Puen Taek =

- Genre: Action; Drama; Music; Comedy; Western
- Based on: Phleng Rak Pha Puen Taek by Vajen
- Screenplay by: Prae Pima
- Directed by: Siam Nuamsretti
- Starring: Saran Sirilak; Ek Rangsiroj; Sammy Cowell; Gavintra Photijak
- Theme music composer: Nipon Chaipayan
- Opening theme: "Phleng Rak Pha Puen Taek" by Rangsiroj Panpeng & Saran Sirilak
- Ending theme: "Chotmai Chak Naeona" by Saran Sirilak
- Country of origin: Thailand
- Original language: Thai
- No. of episodes: 23

Production
- Executive producer: Reviewing Committee of Television Drama, Channel 7
- Producer: Thongchai Prasongsanti
- Running time: 130 minutes
- Production company: Pordeecom Entertainment

Original release
- Network: Channel 7
- Release: 4 July – 24 August 2014

Phleng Rak Pha Puen Taek (Thai: เพลงรักผาปืนแตก) was a Thai action/drama and music (luk thung style) series or lakorn in western genre, it aired on Channel 7 from July 4 to August 24, 2014, on Fridays, Saturdays and Sundays at 20:20 for 23 episodes.

== Plot ==
Ban Pa Puen Taek (บ้านผาปืนแตก; Pa Puen Taek village) in 1969–77, the story begins when Shane Phananchoeng, a hot-tempered young man who goes to the border patrol. Until one day Shane returned to his native Ban Pa Puen Taek. He had to face bad news when he realized that Nueathong his lover has to marry a greatest enemy Chart Talumphuk, so he planned to take Nueathong out, but it turns out that Shane kidnapped Wanlapa to replace, the chaos followed.

== Cast ==
Main cast

- Saran Sirilak as Shane Phananchoeng
- Sammy Cowell as Wanlapa
- Ek Rangsiroj as Pleung Phayafai
- Gavintra Photijak as Auemduean
- Nutthawat Plengsiriwat as Chart Talumphuk
- Poolaphat Attapanyapol as Fahlan Kamramsuek
- Athinan Srisaweang as Nueathong
- Jayjintai Untimanon as Yod Diesel

Supporting cast

- Chartchai Ngamsan as Phukong Saman (Captain Saman)
- Surawut Maikun as Kamnan Prab Thongpan
- Atirut Singhaampol as Cherd
- Sirilapas Kongtrakarn as Namkang Yamratree
- Chalermporn Pumpanwong as Kru Prasit (Master Prasit)
- Krung Srivilai as Luang Por Sin (Venerable Father Sin)
- Pamela Bowden as Lamduan
- Pipatpon Komaratat as Laisuea Kamlue
- Janet Keaw as Noi Cha Cha Cha
- Pichet Sriracha as Saen Supparer
- Luafua Mokjok as Jik Trumpet
- Nopparat Thongridsuk as Toon
- Weerachai Hattagowit as Samruay

Cameo appearance

- Kannaporn Puangtong as Fah-ngam
- Sarut Suwanpakdee as Thongsook
- Thanayong Wongtrakun as Phupan Lertyot (Colonel Lertyot)
- Ron Smoorenburg as Tom
- Atiwat Sanitwong Na Ayudhaya as Tan Sombat (Mr. Sombat)

== Reception and ratings ==
When it aired, the response was exceedingly good, and it is the third highest-rated series in 2014 on Channel 7, and there is a call for sequels.

In the tables below, the blue numbers represent the highest ratings and the red numbers represent the lowest ratings.

Episode	Broadcast Date	AGB Ratings
Episode	Broadcast Date	Nationwide
1	July 4, 2014	9.2%
2	July 5, 2014	12.7%
3	July 6, 2014	11.8%
4	July 11, 2014	9.8%
5	July 12, 2014	11.6%
6	July 13, 2014	11.6%
7	July 18, 2014	10.3%
8	July 19, 2014	10.8%
9	July 20, 2014	11.6%
10	July 25, 2014	11.5%
11	July 26, 2014	11.2%
12	July 27, 2014	11.9%
13	August 1, 2014	8.4%
14	August 2, 2014	13.1%
15	August 3, 2014	14.3%
16	August 8, 2014	8.9%
17	August 9, 2014	13.1%
18	August 15, 2014	10.3%
19	August 16, 2014	12.2%
20	August 17, 2014	13.7%
21	August 22, 2014	7.2%
22	August 23, 2014	12.6%
23	August 24, 2014	12.5%
Average		11.31%

Note: August 10, 2014, no broadcast due to broadcast live FA Community Shield between Arsenal vs Manchester City from England.
