= Satja Nai Chum Joan (Suea Sung Fah III) =

Thai TV series

- Genre: Action; Gangster; Sorcery; Fantasy
- Based on: Satja Nai Chum Joan by Kusuma Sinsuk
- Written by: Dao Nuea; Lalita Chantasadkosol
- Directed by: Anuwat Thanomrod
- Starring: Kelly Tanapat; Akkaphan Namart; Chermawee Suwanpanuchoke; Anna Glucks; Kiatipoom Banluechairit
- Opening theme: "With All My Heart" (Thai: สุดแรงหัวใจ) by Slot Machine
- Ending theme: "I Want You To Know I Love You" (Thai: อยากให้รู้ว่ารัก) by Kankulnut Panpakittinan
- Country of origin: Thailand
- Original language: Thai
- No. of episodes: 17

Production
- Executive producer: Somsook Kaljaruek
- Producer: Disakorn Disayanon
- Production location: Thailand
- Running time: 120 minutes Fridays, Saturdays, Sundays at 20:30 (ICT)
- Production companies: Bangkok Broadcasting & T.V. Co., Ltd; Kantana Group

Original release
- Network: Channel 7 HD
- Release: October 29 – December 4, 2022

Related
- Sentang Banterng; Chidjor..Rodu; Suea Sung Fah (2011); Suea Sung Fah II: Payak Payong (2013)

Satja Nai Chum Joan (Suea Sung Fah III) (Thai: สัจจะในชุมโจร (เสือสั่งฟ้า 3); lit: Word in Bandit's Lair (The Tiger Commands the Heaven III)) is a Thai action/crime TV series aired on Thailand's Channel 7 HD from October 29, to December 4, 2022, on Fridays, Saturdays and Sundays at 20:30 for 17 episodes. It is the third and final installment in the Suea Sung Fah Trilogy, preceded by Suea Sung Fah (2011) and Suea Sung Fah II: Payak Payong (2013).

== Plot ==
After the end of the Asia-Pacific War for many years, at Dong Phaya Yen, the gateway to the great Khao Yai, it appears that a masked bandit is rampant called Suea Dej. Suea Dej is a virtuous and truthful bandit. He often robs the rich who cheat or corrupt bureaucrats and distributes the looted assets to the poor villagers. He is therefore a favorite of the locals and has been dubbed "King of Dong Phaya Yen".

One day, a mysterious man, along with his sidekick, rescued a wounded woman named Auem Chan and Waeo Dao, the younger sister of Rachan, concealed form of Suea Dej. He is Han, Han, in fact, is a magic bandit known as Suea Han. Suea Dej has a grudge against Suea Han because he firmly believes that Suea Han was the cause of his parents' death. So he had to avenge.

== Cast ==
=== Main ===
- Akkaphan Namart as Rachan/ Suea Dej (Tiger Dej)
- Chermawee Suwanpanuchoke as Jariya
- Kelly Tanapat as Suea Han (Tiger Han)
- Anna Glucks as Waeo Dao
- Kiatipoom Banluechairit as Pol. Capt. Kokitat
- Krittarit Butprom as Suea Khem

=== Supporting ===
- Shahkrit Boonsing as Pol. Lt. Natee
- Kanya Rattanapetch as Auem Chan
- Chanapat Wonghrienthai as Suk
- Somjit Jongjohor as Ja Dab (Sergeant Dab)
- Supatpon Kasikam as Ram
- Amarin Simarot as Pol. Col. Narit
- Thapakorn Dissayanan as Inkarm
- Kasab Champadib as Boonyoung
- Vudhinan Maikan as Rueang
- Wayne Falconer as Headman Kerd
- Nuttanan Khunwat as Cherdchon
- Farida Waller as Anchan
- Jim Chuanchuen as Ja Kaew (Sergeant Kaew)
- Silord Chernyim as Boonkuea
- Suchada Poonpattanasuk as Kru Thong (Teacher Thong)

=== Special appearances ===
- Chatmongkol Bumpen as Luang Rattana
- Ek Rangsiroj as Suea Mek (Tiger Mek)
- Chartchai Ngamsan as Commander Yingyot
- Tharathip Sihadejrungchai as Suea Tam (Tiger Tam)
- John Bravo as Suea Lam (Tiger Lam)
- Krailas Kraingkrai Luang Phu Boontha (Pastor Boontha)
- Kittipan Bhumsuko as Commander Sura
- Sitavasin Kabinchonlathit as Rachen

== Production ==
Satja Nai Chum Joan (Suea Sung Fah III) is the third installment of the popular action drama TV series Suea Sung Fah (aka Legend of the Tiger) trilogy, preceded by Suea Sung Fah in 2011 and Suea Sung Fah II: Payak Payong in 2013, with the protagonist is Suea Han. The duration is 11 years from the first part and 9 years from the second part.

The series has the same performer who plays Suea Han, Kelly Tanapat, to play the same role. He said he loves this character. It was produced by the original production team, and the same director from the previous two installments, Anuwat Thanomrod.

Channel 7 HD, the copyright owner, has released a teaser and a trailer since the beginning of the year, even though it was broadcast at the end of the year. Before the broadcast, there was a sacrifice ceremony on October 10, 2022, at Ganesha courtyard, Channel 7 HD.

Because it is a completely unfinished filming series. There are still 80 percent remaining. Leading actor, Akkaphan Namart got sick suddenly. The production team then changed the leading actor to be Krittarit Butprom taking on the role of the protagonist instead at the end.

In addition, in episode 17 (finale), there are also main and supporting characters from Suea Sung Fah, the first part, appear to be seen, such as Suea Mek, Yingyot to end this trilogy series.

== Ratings ==
In this table, the blue numbers represent the lowest ratings and the red numbers represent the highest ratings.

Ep.	Original broadcast date	Average audience share (AGB Nielsen)
Ep.	Original broadcast date	Nationwide
1	October 29, 2022	4.6%
2	October 30, 2022	4.0%
3	November 4, 2022	4.4%
4	November 5, 2022	4.4%
5	November 6, 2022	4.2%
6	November 11, 2022	4.3%
7	November 12, 2022	4.4%
8	November 13, 2022	4.7%
9	November 18, 2022	4.7%
10	November 19, 2022	5.3%
11	November 20, 2022	4.7%
12	November 25, 2022	4.3%
13	November 26, 2022	4.8%
14	November 27, 2022	4.9%
15	December 2, 2022	4.8%
16	December 3, 2022	5.1%
17	December 4, 2022	5.3%
Average		4.6%
