= Adireksarn =

Adireksarn is a Thai surname. Notable people with the surname include:

- Pongpol Adireksarn (born 1942), Thai novelist and politician
- Pramarn Adireksarn (1913–2010), Thai general and politician, father of Pongpol
