= The Art of Love =

The Art of Love may refer to:

- The Art of Love (Ovid) (Ars Amatoria), a 2 AD poem by Ovid
- The Art of Love (1965 film), an American comedy starring Dick Van Dyke and James Garner
- The Art of Love (2011 film), a French comedy by Emmanuel Mouret
- The Art of Love (album), a 2007 album by Sandra
- Art of Love (Art Supawatt Purdy album), a 2003 Warner Music CD by Thai-American singer Art Supawatt Purdy
- Art of Love: Music of Machaut, a 2009 album by Robert Sadin
- "Art of Love" (song), a 2009 song by Guy Sebastian
- "The Art of Love", a 1965 song by Eartha Kitt
- Art of Love, a 2001 short film featuring Erin Sanders
- An alternative title for the 1928 German film Princess Olala
- Art of Love (2022 film), a Puerto Rican romantic thriller film
- Art of Love (2024 film), a Turkish romance film

== See also ==
- The Art of Loving, a 1956 book by Erich Fromm
