= Saicheer Wongwirot =

Thai actor, comedian, singer and stuntman

- สายเชีย วงศ์วิโรจน์
- Born: March 18, 1969 (age 56); Thoeng, Chiang Rai, Thailand
- Occupations: Actor; comedian; stuntman; TV commercial actor; real estate investor
- Years active: 1988–present
- Children: 3, including Talubjai Wongwirot

Saicheer Wongwirot (Thai: สายเชีย วงศ์วิโรจน์; RTGS: Sai-chia Wongwirot) is a Thai actor, comedian, singer, stuntman and real estate investor. He is also featured in several world class films.

== Biography and career ==
He was born into a poor family in Chiang Rai province whose father is a native of Khorat (Nakhon Ratchasima), his mother is from Maha Sarakham. His family moved to many provinces including Phayao, Samut Prakan and Kamphaeng Phet. His name "Saicheer" is derived from the Asian Highway 12 (known in Thailand as "ทางหลวงสายเอเชีย"; Tang Luang Sai Asia; "Asian Highway Route"). His father gave him this name because he was born in the same year that this highway was built.

He had the opportunity to play in his first film, Rambo III (1988), from seeing newspaper ads for supporting actors.

He has since starred as supporting actor in several famous films as A Moment of Romance (1990), Lara Croft Tomb Raider: The Cradle of Life (2003), Batman Begins (2005), Typhoon (2005), Rescue Dawn (2006), Rambo (2008), Ninja: Shadow of a Tear (2013), Lost in Thailand (2013) or Only God Forgives (2013), while working in Thai films such as Buppah Rahtree (2003), Ghost Station (2007), Rahtree Reborn (2009), Power Kids (2009), Sua Sung Fah (2011) and Bangkok Assassins (2011) etc.

In Thailand, he is famously known in a campaign, which aims to decrease alcohol consumption in rural areas, by the Thai Health Promotion Foundation (ThaiHealth) in 2008. He shouted "Jon Kriad Kin Lao" (จน เครียด กินเหล้า; "I'm poor, I'm stressed, so I drink!"). This phrase was repeated several times until the identity, which has afforded by singing the same name. In some other countries, especially in Vietnam where it is known as Thăm Ngàn (from ทำงาน, Thai for "work"), it has become an Internet sensation.

In addition to acting roles, he has a water park business on his own land of more than 500 rai (80 ha; 200 acres) in Nakhon Pathom province close to Bangkok.

In family life, Saicheer has three children with a divorced wife. One of his daughters is Talubjai Wongwirot who was a former Thai national youth volleyball player.

== Filmography ==
=== Dramas ===
Year	Thai title	Title	Role	Network	Notes	With
1999	ตี๋ใหญ่	Tee Yai		Channel 3		
2000	ดอกแก้วการะบุหนิง	Dok Kaew Karabuning		Channel 3		
2002	นิราศสองภพ	Niras Song Pope		Channel 3		
2006	น.ส.สัปเหร่อ	Nang Sao Suproe		Channel 3		
2011	เสือสั่งฟ้า	Sua Sung Fah		Channel 7		
2013	เสือสั่งฟ้า 2 พยัคฆ์ผยอง	Sua Sung Fah II: Payak Payong		Channel 7		
2015	ผู้กองยอดรัก	Poo Kong Yod Ruk		Channel 3		
2018	วายุเทพยุทธ์	Monkey Twins		One 31		

=== Series ===
Year	Thai title	Title	Role	Network	Notes	With
2012	บันทึกกรรม ตอน ซวยจะเฮง	Bantuek Kum		L		

=== Sitcom ===
Year	Thai title	Title	Role	Network	Notes	With
2017	ระเบืดเถิดเทิง แดร็กคูล่าหารัก ตอน ความลับแตก	Raboed Thoed Toeng	Channel	Invited actor		

=== Film ===
Year	Thai title	Title	Role	Note	Reference
1998	เสือ โจรพันธุ์เสือ	Crime Kings			
2011	ลาร์โก้ วินซ์ ยอดคนอันตรายล่าข้ามโลก	Largo Winch II	Ko Sin		
2012	แก๊งม่วนป่วนไทยแลนด์	Lost in Thailand	Muay Thai kickboxer		
2013	เมนูของพ่อ	Daddy's Menu	Tony		
2013	รับคำท้าจากพระเจ้า	Only God Forgives	Hitman		
2018	นาคี ๒	Nakee 2			

=== Advertising ===
Year	Thai title	Title	Notes	With
2008	สีตรางู			
2017	ปุ๋ยตราปลานิลทอง			
2017	ปุ๋ยตรา TOP ONE			
2018	ยากำจัดมด แมลงสาป ยุง ปลวก ตรา Chaindrite			
2020	เครื่องดื่มสมุนไพรสกัด ตรา อัศวิน			
2021	น้ำปลาแท้ ตรา เด็กสมบูรณ์			
