= Tulip Thong =

- Genre: Action; Drama
- Based on: Tulip Thong by Poompandin
- Written by: Naputh Susricharoensuk
- Directed by: Philip Chalong
- Starring: Ek Rangsiroj; Sornsin Maneewan; Dom Hetrakul; Talika Chindachia
- Opening theme: Tulip Thong by Kaewkarn Chuenpennit
- Ending theme: Tulip Son Jai by Kaewkarn Chuenpennit
- Country of origin: Thailand
- Original languages: Thai; English; Dutch
- No. of episodes: 15

Production
- Executive producer: Pimsupak Pakdeevijit
- Producer: Philip Chalong
- Production locations: Thailand; Netherlands
- Running time: 130 minutes (per episode); Fridays, Saturdays and Sundays at 20:15 (ICT)
- Production companies: Reviewing Committee of Television Drama, Channel 7 Insee Audio Vision Co., Ltd.

Original release
- Network: Channel 7
- Release: November 3 – December 3, 2017

Related
- Sen Tang Ban Terng; Chid Jor Ror Doo

Tulip Thong (Thai: ทิวลิปทอง; RTGS: Tulip Tong; lit: "Golden Tulip") is a 2017 Thai TV miniseries or lakorn directed and produced by Guinness World Record Oldest TV Director Chalong Pakdeevijit (Philip Chalong). Tulip Thong airs on Thailand's Channel 7 (Ch.7HD) every Friday -Sunday at 8:15pm ICT, with the first episode premiering on November 3, 2017 (Loy Kratong Night 2017).

== Synopsis ==
Wrapped in tragedy and stained by blood, the Golden Tulip carries a deadly legacy: those who touch its secret pay with their lives. Following her father's mysterious death in Thailand, a young designer inherits the lethal relic and becomes the primary target of a powerful syndicate. Refusing to back down, she journeys to Bangkok to unravel her father's final days, shielded only by a dedicated Thai police team standing between her and the shadows.

== Cast ==
- Ek Rangsiroj as Phum Phatthanayuth (Phum)
- Sornsin Maneewan as Phanmanee (Punch)
- Dom Hetrakul as Pol. Capt. Chakri
- Talika Chindachia as Lisa Schnieder
- Marisa Anita as Maria
- Kanokkorn Jaicheun as Fah
- Kamonwan Srivilai as Pol. Sub. Lt. Orawan WRTP (lieutenant Orn)
- Ah-Tsui Sianglor as Sergeant Chai
- Krung Srivilai as Pee Pleum (old brother Pleum)
- Art Supawatt Purdy as Marko
- Theerathun Khajornchaidejawat as Pete
- Thasachai Chanaathakarn as Kao-yod (Sia Kao)
- Korakot Thanapat as Tommy
- Joe Bangbon as White
- Aon Angkor as Red
- Num Benzu as Blue
- Thanadej Tasomboon as Black
- Chris Kunanukorn as Johan
- Kawin Thanapat as Michael Lee
- Ekapun Bunluerit as Capt. Payaktape (Capt. Suea)
- Nattakit Promdontree as Yuth
- Amot Intanont as Tat
- Pongsanart Vinsiri as Hia Soi (big brother Soi)
- Keetapat Untimanon as Natalee Bosovick
- Park Smith as Alex
- Michael Corp Dyrendal as Mr. Park
- Chalee Kreechai as Hatu
- Ravisara Insee as Subee
- Chakthip Thongthip as Bajoh
- Roy van der Wal as Roy Ramos
- Pichet Sriracha as Inspector Kanchanaburi
- Sot Chitalada as Punch and Pete's father (cameo)

== Production ==
Tulip Thong is a 15-episodes action-drama miniseries directed and produced by "Action Film Tycoon" Chalong Pakdeevijit, known affectionately in Thailand as 'Ar Long'. To honor his new wife 'Pimsupak Insee', Chalong established a new production company called Insee Audio Vision Co., Ltd. to produce Tulip Thong. The filming of this big budget TV miniseries took place in both Thailand and the Netherlands. In April 2016, a total of 35 cast and crew traveled to the Netherlands to film on location for 3 weeks. The production budget for filming in the Netherlands alone was 15 million baht. Tulip Thong was a television acting debut for Talika "Som" Chindachia who played one of the female lead in the role of Lisa Schnieder and was the only miniseries produced by Insee Audio Vision Co., Ltd.
