= Look Poochai Mai Ta Pode =

- Also known as: The Mighty Canes
- Genre: Action; Superhero; Fantasy
- Screenplay by: Ping Lumpraploeng
- Story by: Worakan
- Directed by: Ekapop Tanyongmassakul
- Starring: Kelly Tanapat; Saran Sirilak; Napassakorn Midaim; Pariyachat Limthammahisorn
- Opening theme: "Look Poochai Mai Ta Pode" by Saran Sirilak
- Ending theme: "Suk Wun Tong Dai Dee" by Saran Sirilak
- Country of origin: Thailand
- Original language: Thai
- No. of episodes: 22

Production
- Executive producer: Somsook Kaljaruek
- Producer: Chitralada Disayanon
- Production location: Thailand
- Running time: 120 minutes
- Production companies: Board of Directors, Channel 7 Kantana Group

Original release
- Network: Channel 7
- Release: March 9 – April 27, 2012

Related
- Evening News: Second Edition; Praden Det 7 Si; Ta Pode Logun (2015)

Look Poochai Mai Ta Pode (Thai: ลูกผู้ชายไม้ตะพด; RTGS: Luk Phuchai Mai Taphot; English title: The Mighty Canes) is a Thai TV series or lakorn aired on Thailand's Channel 7 from March 9 to April 27, 2012, on Fridays, Saturdays and Sundays at 20:30 for 22 episodes.

The sequel is Ta Pode Logun which was broadcast in 2015.

== Summary ==
At a community of bus terminus, when villagers were threatened by thieves. There will always be black masked superhero appear to help, everybody called him "Look Poochai" (ลูกผู้ชาย; "manly"). Look Poochai has two magic Ta Pode (ตะพด; type of Thai cane), one is Soul Ta Pode, and another is Blood Ta Pode. They are what the godfather wants to be.

== Cast ==
Role	Actor
Mek, Look Poochai	Kelly Tanapat
Mai	Saran Sirilak
Aobcheuy	Pariyachat Limthammahisorn
Pantape	Napassakorn Midaim
Khun Krai (Mr. Krai)	Thanwa Suriyajak
Praewa, Ratree	Nattasha Nauljam
Teewa	Mick Tongraya
Jae Kee (Sister Kee)	Aphiradi Phawaphutanon
Sornnarai	Chartchai Ngamsan
Phaya Vetaal (Vetala)	Winai Kraibutr
