= Art of Love (Art Supawatt Purdy album) =

Studio album by Art Supawatt
- Released: October 28, 2003
- Genres: Thai pop, Country Rock, pop rock, Latin
- Length: 44:39
- Language: Thai
- Label: Warner Music
- Producer: Tanongsak Arpornsiri

Art Supawatt chronology
Art of Love (2003)	Soi Cowboy Soundtrack (2008)

Singles from Art oF Love
- 1. "Ya Ton Eak Leoy (Thai: อย่าทนอีกเลย)" Released: October 28, 2003; 2. "Bai Mai (Thai: ใบใม้)" Released: 2003

Art of Love is the debut studio album by Thai-American actor turned singer Art Supawatt Purdy, released on October 28, 2003, by Warner Music Thailand. The 11-track collection of love songs was produced by Tanongsak Arpornsiri, a member of Thailand legendary band GrandEx and the producer behind many successful records by Thai pop biggest names like Thongchai McIntyre and Tata Young.

After having established himself as an actor in the leading role in several Thai language television miniseries (lakhon), Purdy signed on to headline 'Lakorn in Concert', a musical on tour in a rock concert style, and discovered his love for singing and entertaining live audience. In 2003, he signed a recording contract with Warner Music Thailand and gave up acting completely to devote all of his time and energy to making this album. Tanongsak Arpornsiri was chosen to produce Purdy's debut effort which was recorded in six months from March to August 2003 and featured songs with pop, rock, country rock and latin influence, except the lead single 'Ya Ton Eak Leoy' (Thai: อย่าทนอีกเลย) which was written and produced by Sakarat Amatayakul. The result was an adult contemporary album 'Art of Love', a collection of songs about different types of love in different level of emotions. In the years that followed the release of this album, Purdy travelled the world to perform in several series of concert tours regularly in places like Japan, Europe, and USA.

Purdy appeared as himself in 2008 at the 61st Cannes Film Festival, performing the lead single "Ya Ton Eak Leoy" (Thai: อย่าทนอีกเลย) and the uptempo version of "Yaak Euie Wa Ruk" (Thai: อยากเอ่ยว่ารัก) live in the climactic scenes of the film presented there called Soi Cowboy. Directed by English director Thomas Clay, Soi Cowboy was one of only 20 films that year to receive the honour of becoming the Official Selection to compete for the Un Certain Regard award. For his effort on the soundtrack, Purdy also received the same honour in the music department for the two songs from Art of Love and the newly recorded theme song "Where We Never Grow Old".

== Track listing ==
1. "Ya Ton Eak Leoy (Groovy Mix) (Thai: อย่าทนอีกเลย)" (Tumrongvit Choovong, Sakarat Amatayakul) – 3:43
2. "Bai Mai (Thai: ใบไม้)" (Suriya Ojareon, MONESUREE) – 4:38
3. "Yark Eui Wa Rak (Thai: อยากเอ่ยว่ารัก)" (Suriya Ojareon, Tanongsak Arpornsiri) – 4:37
4. "Jai Mun Klua (Thai: ใจมันกลัว)" (Suriya Ojareon, MONESUREE) – 3:39
5. "Hom (Thai: หอม)" (Suriya Ojareon, Tanongsak Arpornsiri) – 3:53
6. "Ter Khon Pised (Thai: เธอคนพิเศษ)" (Suriya Ojareon, Tanongsak Arpornsiri) – 4:34
7. "Kratai Mai Jun (Thai: กระต่ายหมายจันทร์)" (Suriya Ojareon, Tanongsak Arpornsiri) – 4:04
8. "Peuan Kao (Thai: เพื่อนเก่า)" (Suriya Ojareon, Tanongsak Arpornsiri) – 4:40
9. "Songsai Fan Young Mai Kerd (Thai: สงสัยแฟนยังไม่เกิด)" (Suriya Ojareon, Tanongsak Arpornsiri) – 3:25
10. "Du be Duu" (Suriya Ojareon, Chatchai Rungsawang) – 3:43
11. "Ya Ton Eak Leoy (Original Version) (Thai: อย่าทนอีกเลย)" (Tumrongvit Choovong, Sakarat Amatayakul) – 3:43
- Executive Producer: Tanongsak Arpornsiri
- Producer: Tanongsak Arpornsiri

Except (1) Uthaiwut Meuanthong (11) Sakarat Amartayakul
