= Arucha Tosawat =

Thai actor and model

- Born: Rattanaballang Tosawat; September 22, 1979 (age 46); Wanon Niwat, Sakon Nakhon Thailand
- Other name: A
- Occupations: Actor, host
- Years active: 2006–2020

Arucha Tosawat (Thai: อรุชา โตสวัสดิ์, also spelled Tohssawat; born Rattanaballang Tosawat 22 September 1979) is a Thai film and television actor.

== Biography ==
He graduated from Bangkok University with a Bachelor of Arts degree in Advertising. He is most known for his lead role as Mehk (Cloud in English) in Bangkok Love Story (2007), in Fireball as Tun (2009) and in The Meat Grinder (2009). He has also played a number of TV series and sitcoms on Thai television stations ITV and Channel 7. Arucha likes to post photos with kids on his personal Instagram.

== Award nominations ==
In 2008, he was nominated for Best Actor for his role in Bangkok Love Story at the Suphannahong National Film Awards

== Filmography ==
=== Film ===
Year	Title	Role
2006	Chai Lai	
2006	Noo Hin: The Movie	
2007	Bangkok Love Story	Mehk
2009	Fireball	Tun
2009	Meat Grinder	Attaphol
2011	Baan Phi Pob Reformation	Natthaphon
2012	Spicy Beauty Queen of Bangkok 2	Porshe

=== Television series ===
Year	Title	Role
2006	Norasing	Norasing
2007	Namo Hero Pu Na Rak	
2008	Koh Mahasajan	Ken
2008	Yoei Fa Tha Din	Sakda
2008	Montra Haeng Ruk	Preeti
2009	Nitarn Taloo Miti	
2010	Reun Son Ruk	Pakorn
2011	Suea Sung Fah	Suea Tab
2012	Zeal 5 Kon Gla Tah Atam	Peak
2012	Sanae Ruk Poot Sao	Don
2012	Pin Anong	Teera
2013	Suea Sung Fah II: Payak Payong	Suea Tab
2013	Roy Lae Sanae Luang	Choet
2013	Maya See Mook	Watthana
2013	Yomabaan Jao Ka	Ek
2014	Susan Khon Pen	Chong
2014	Hua Jai Teuan	Chon
2014	Lah Ruk Sut Kob Fah	Suthep
2014	Rak Tem Ban	Joon
2014	Beauty and the Bitches	Decha
2014	Look Poochai Pan Dee Season 3	Cheep
2015	Yot Manut Dap Thewada	Guest
2015	Koo Hoo Koo Hean 2	Akanay
2015	Teppabud Sudwayha	Warong
2015	Ban Sai Thong	Boonlom Pisitwittaya
2016	Puer Tur	Thawin
2016	Atita	Thongmen
2016	Wimarn Mekala	Thoet
2016	Pak Boong Kub Goong Nang	Tor
2016	Fatal Destiny	Sakda
2016	Thayat Asun	Khon
2016	Petch Tud Petch	Cheng
2016	Dao Lhong Fah Phupaa See Ngern	Xenon
2017	The Graveyard Story	
2017	Plerng Phra Nang	Kanaung
2017	The Spirit of the Ruler	Thiti
2017	The Law Protector	Thiti
2018	Sai Rak Sai Sawat	Tana
2018	Sai Lohit	Alaungpaya
2019	Dong Phu Dee	Guest
2020	Her Desire	Upparat Kanaung
