= Meat Grinder =

2009 Thai splatter film

- Theatrical release poster
- Directed by: Tiwa Moeithaisong
- Written by: Tiwa Moeithaisong
- Produced by: Poj Arnon; Thawatchai Phanpakdee
- Starring: Mai Charoenpura; Jirachaya Jirarachakij; Pimchanok Luevisadpaibul; Anuway Niwartwong; Wiradit Srimala; Rattanaballang Tohssawat; Duangta Tungkamanee
- Cinematography: Tiwa Moeithaisong
- Edited by: Tiwa Moeithaisong
- Music by: Giant Wave Co. Ltd
- Production company: Film Guru Company Ltd
- Distributed by: Phranakorn Film
- Release date: 19 March 2009
- Running time: 102 minutes (Uncut); 84 minutes (Cut)
- Country: Thailand
- Language: Thai
- Box office: $393,583

Meat Grinder (Thai: เชือดก่อนชิม; RTGS: Chueat Kon Chim, lit. "Slaughter Before Tasting"), known before its theatrical release as Kuai Teaw Neua Khon (Thai: ก๋วยเตี๋ยวเนื้อคน; lit. "Human Flesh Noodle"), is a 2009 Thai splatter film co-written, directed, and edited by Tiwa Moeithaisong. The film stars Mai Charoenpura as Buss, a noodle vendor whose troubled past drives her into a series of murders in which she serves her victims' flesh to unsuspecting customers. The cast also includes Jirachaya Jirarachakij, Pimchanok Luevisadpaibul, Anuway Niwartwong, Wiradit Srimala, Rattanaballang Tohssawat, and Duangta Tungkamanee, with supporting roles played by Somlek Sakdikul and Atitaya Shindejanichakul.

The film was produced by Film Guru Company Ltd and released in Thailand on 19 March 2009 in a censored 84-minute version after scenes of graphic violence were removed and its original title was changed following objections from noodle vendors and the censorship board. An uncut 102-minute version was later released internationally, including in the United Kingdom in 2010, while the film was twice refused classification in South Korea because of its graphic violence and mature content.

Meat Grinder received generally positive reviews from critics, who praised Charoenpura's performance, Moeithaisong's visual direction, and the film's blend of psychological drama and extreme horror, although many reviewers noted that its graphic violence would limit its mainstream appeal. The film was nominated for three awards at the 2010 Thailand National Film Association Awards, including Best Actress for Charoenpura.

== Plot ==
Buss (Note: The character's name is spelled as "Buss", "Bus", or "But" in different English-language sources due to variations in the romanization of the Thai name.) is a woman who experienced severe abuse by her parents while growing up. She was often beaten and sometimes forced underwater as a child. As an adult, she takes over her family's struggling beef noodle shop after her mother steps away. She also looks after her younger sister Bua, who has a disability. On top of this, Buss is left with heavy debts after her husband Prawit abandons the family to live with his mistress.

While pushing her noodle cart one day, Buss is caught in a violent student protest that is eventually dispersed by soldiers. During the confusion, she is helped by a young man named Atthapol. Later that night, Buss discovers the dead body of a student hidden inside the storage compartment of her cart. Fearing the consequences, she preserves the body with herbs and uses the flesh in her noodles. The food unexpectedly attracts more customers, causing her business to improve. Atthapol becomes a regular visitor and slowly grows close to Buss, often helping and looking after her.

Prawit's creditor, Mogul, later arrives with a henchman to demand repayment. Buss invites them inside her home, kills them, and disposes of their bodies by using the remains in her cooking. Not long after, Prawit returns with his lover Aio while Buss is away, and the two drown Bua. When Buss finds her sister's body, she is overwhelmed by grief. She captures Prawit and Aio and tortures them in a hidden room until they die. When Atthapol visits, he finds Buss crying beside Bua's corpse and believes she has lost her sense of reality.

As her business continues to grow, Buss meets Aio's fiancé, who is searching for her and becomes suspicious of Buss' behavior. She later kills him and uses his body in her noodles as well. At the same time, Buss grows jealous of Atthapol's increasing closeness to a woman named Nida. Driven by jealousy, she kidnaps and tortures her. Nida briefly escapes but is recaptured by Buss, who nails her hands to a table and prepares to kill her.

Atthapol arrives and stops Buss. Buss convinces herself that Atthapol never loved her and only cares for Nida, even though he genuinely has feelings for her. Distressed, she runs to a bridge as police begin to close in. Hearing her sister's voice urging her to kill Atthapol, Buss suffers a mental breakdown and jumps into the river. The police later suspect Atthapol of being involved in the murders. However, Buss survives and secretly returns home, where she finds her mother smiling while cutting up human flesh.

== Cast ==
- Mai Charoenpura as Buss
- Rattanaballang Tohssawat as Atthapol
- Pimchanok Luevisadpaibul as Nida
- Anuway Niwartwong as Prawit
- Wiradit Srimalai as Lek
- Duangta Tungkamanee as Buss' mother
- Jirachaya Jirarachakij as Bua
- Somlek Sakdikul as Mogul
- Atitaya Shindejanichakul as Aio

== Production ==
Tiwa Moeithaisong worked as a cinematographer before directing Meat Grinder, including on the 2007 film Bangkok Love Story. He wrote, directed, served as cinematographer, and edited Meat Grinder, which was described as one of his most ambitious projects. Moeithaisong had previously worked in the horror genre, directing Ghost Delivery (2003) and The Sisters (2004) before making Meat Grinder. The film was produced by Film Guru Company Ltd, with Poj Arnon and Thawatchai Panpakdee serving as producers. Moeithaisong said that the film's title was changed and parts of it were re-edited following requests from the Thai censorship board.

The film stars Mai Charoenpura as Buss, alongside Jirachaya Jirarachakij, Pimchanok Luevisadpaibul, Anuway Niwartwong, Wiradit Srimala, Rattanaballang Tohssawat, and Duangta Tungkamanee, with supporting roles played by Somlek Sakdikul and Atitaya Shindejanichakul. During filming, a scene at Bobae Market in Bangkok caused confusion among vendors after Charoenpura appeared covered in blood effects while holding a knife, leading some people nearby to believe the incident was real. The scene depicted Buss during a period of emotional breakdown, and Charoenpura later described it as one of the most challenging parts of her role because of the physical and emotional demands of the performance. The film's special effects were created by Thai special effects artist Khun Q. Sakdikul underwent an extensive special effects makeup process to portray an overweight character. A body prosthetic took about two months to create, while a lifecast of his body required a full day to complete. Before filming, he also spent more than three hours in makeup for the application of the prosthetics.

== Release ==
Meat Grinder was released in Thailand on 19 March 2009 under the title Chueat Kon Chim, and distributed by Phranakhorn Film. Despite the censorship controversy, the film opened strongly at the Thai box office, debuting at number one with earnings of 6.6 million baht during its opening week. Classified as containing "strong gory violence and horror", an uncut rated version was released in the United Kingdom with a duration of 102 minutes on 23 August 2010. The film was marketed in the United Kingdom with a DVD cover and promotional artwork emphasizing graphic imagery and featuring the killer rather than the victims. The artwork also used blood-stained and dark visual motifs similar to those used in films such as Hostel (2005) and Martyrs (2008). The film was also banned twice in South Korea for extremely high themes and violence, strong sex, language, horror and imitation risk.

=== Censorship ===
"We thought the name wouldn't be a problem, because there was a previous film called Human Flesh Steamed Buns. But that was a long time ago. I never thought the censorship board would ask us to change the film's name, saying it would cause problems for noodle vendors. We didn't want it to be seen as something horrifying or disgusting. We wanted to make this film for entertainment; it's the Moeithaisong's imagination. But when the censorship board said the meaning might have an impact, we had to take responsibility by changing the name to Cheud Kon Chim (Slaughter Before Tasting) and making the trailer less graphic."

— Producer Poj Arnon discussed the Thai censorship board's concerns that the film could negatively affect noodle vendors.

The film was originally titled Kuai-tiao Nuea Khon (ก๋วยเตี๋ยวเนื้อคน; "Human Flesh Noodles"), but the title was changed to Chueat Kon Chim (เชือดก่อนชิม; "Slaughter Before You Taste") following objections from the Film and Video Censorship Committee of the Ministry of Culture and concerns from noodle vendors. The committee deemed the film a threat to national security, citing concerns that it could negatively affect noodle sales and objecting to scenes depicting the disappearances of people during the 6 October 1976 massacre. Arnon stated that the censorship board required further changes to the film's trailer, with several scenes also removed before its release. The censorship issues were reported shortly before release, with reports describing the cuts as a result of its graphic violence and brutality. The controversy also attracted attention from noodle shop owners, who objected to the film's portrayal of noodle preparation involving human flesh.

== Reception ==
=== Critical response ===
Meat Grinder received generally positive reviews, with critics discussing Tiwa Moeithaisong's direction, visual style, and Mai Charoenpura's performance, while some criticized its plot and noted that its extreme violence would limit its appeal to wider audiences. Maggie Lee of The Hollywood Reporter praised the film's dark plot twists, particularly one involving a "family recipe", as well as Tiwa Moeithaisong's visual style, noting the contrast between bleak black-and-white realism and richly saturated colors. Allan Kelly of Den of Geek criticized the film's plot as underdeveloped, describing Buss as a "spectre-like sociopath" and stating that the film's backstory was too vague and confusing to make the character compelling.

Derek Elley of Variety described the film as a "femme-driven hybrid" noting its striking visual style and its combination of graphic violence and art-house aspirations. Anton Bitel of Eye For Film gave the film 4 out of 5 stars, writing that it initially resembled "The Texas Chain Saw Massacre for the torture-porn generation" before praising it for exploring themes of gender, family, and society beyond its graphic violence. James Mudge of Eastern Kicks rated the film 4 out 5 stars, and said that its production values, visuals, use of colour, shadow, and atmosphere elevated it beyond a typical gore film. He also noted that the film explored themes of mental illness, the mistreatment of women, and social violence, while describing Mai Charoenpura's lead performance as giving depth to Buss' character despite her being "too cruel and crazy to really feel sympathy for."

The List gave the film 3 out of 5 stars, describing Charoenpura's performance as "impressive" and praising Moeithaisong's visual direction, while criticizing the frequent camera tricks and flashbacks for creating more confusion than depth.

=== Themes and analysis ===
Critics have interpreted that Meat Grinder as using its "cannibal horror" premise to explore broader issues beyond violence. Bitel of Eye For Film stated that the film examines themes of gender, family, and society through Buss' unreliable perspective, portraying her as both a victim of abuse and an agent of violence. Colette Balmain argued that cannibalism in the film functions as a mechanism through which both personal and political traumas are articulated. She also described Meat Grinder as aesthetically more "art-house" than "grind-house", despite its exploitation and horror elements. The film has been compared to both Sweeney Todd: The Demon Barber of Fleet Street (2007) and Hong Kong Category III horror film The Untold Story (1993) because of its premise involving a killer who prepares food using human flesh. Mary J. Ainslie and Katarzyna Ancuta wrote in Thai Cinema: The Complete Guide that Meat Grinder combines its exploitation elements with social commentary and psychological drama.

=== Accolades ===
The following nominations are based on information listed in TV Guide's awards database, as no official archive of the 2010 Thailand National Film Association Awards nominations could be located.

Accolades received by Meat Grinder
Award ceremony	Date	Category	Recipient(s)	Result
Thailand National Film Association Awards	2010	Best Actress	Mai Charoenpura	Nominated
Thailand National Film Association Awards	2010	Best Art Direction	Meat Grinder	Nominated
Thailand National Film Association Awards	2010	Best Make-up	Siwakorn Suklankarn and Nattakarn Uthaiwan	Nominated
