= Heart cancer =

- Specialty: Oncology, Cardiology

Heart cancer is an extremely rare form of cancer that is divided into primary tumors of the heart and secondary tumors of the heart.

== Types ==
=== Primary ===
Most heart tumors begin with myxomas, fibromas, rhabdomyomas, and hamartomas, although malignant sarcomas (such as angiosarcoma or cardiac sarcoma) have been known to occur. In a study of 12,487 autopsies performed in Hong Kong seven cardiac tumors were found, most of which were benign. According to Mayo Clinic: "At Mayo Clinic, on average only one case of heart cancer is seen each year." In a study conducted in the Hospital of the Medical University of Vienna 113 primary cardiac tumour cases were identified in a time period of 15 years with 11 being malignant. The mean survival in the latter group of patients was found to be 26.2 ± 9.8 months.

Primary malignant cardiac tumors (PMCTs) are even rarer. The most recent published study about PMCTs used the Surveillance, Epidemiology and End-Results (SEER) Cancer Registry to study 497 patients with PMCTs who were diagnosed during 2000–2001 in the United States. Most cases were angiosarcomas (27.3%) with an incidence of 0.107 per 1,000,000 person-years and Non-Hodgkin's lymphomas [NHL] (26.9%), with an incidence of 0.108 per 1,000,000 person-years. The incidence rate of NHL increased significantly over the study period, but the incidence of cardiac angiosarcomas did not. The overall survival of NHL was found to be significantly better than angiosarcomas.

Another previous study using the Surveillance, Epidemiology and End-Results (SEER) Cancer Registry from 1973 to 2011 found 551 cases of PMCTs, with an incidence of 34 cases per million persons. The study also found that the incidence has doubled over the past four decades. The associated mortality was very high, with only 46% of patients alive after one year. Sarcomas and mesotheliomas had the worst survival, while lymphomas had better survival. When compared with extracardiac tumors, PMCTs had worse survival.

=== Secondary ===
Secondary or metastatic heart tumours are much more common than primary heart tumours, occurring even 100 times more often. Every tumour in theory can metastasize to the heart with the only exception being tumours of the central nervous system. Malignant melanomas frequently metastasize to the heart, and represent the tumour with the highest rate of cardiac metastases (in more than half of cases).

== Signs and symptoms ==
Patients with heart tumours usually have non-specific symptoms, such as dyspnea (in particular, shortness of breath when lying down), thoracoabdominal pain (pain in the general area around the heart), fatigue, hemoptysis, nausea and vomiting, fever, weight loss, and night sweats. These symptoms mimic symptoms of other heart diseases, which can make diagnosis difficult.

== Diagnosis ==
In most cases, the diagnosis is based on clinical history, echocardiography, a CT scan or an MRI scan. Cardiac tumours are often first diagnosed after the patient has had a stroke or an embolism caused by detached tumour tissue.

== Treatment ==
=== Primary tumours ===
==== Benign tumors ====
Most of these can be cured if the tumor can be completely removed. When a tumor is very large or there are multiple tumors, removing part of it that is not inside the heart walls can improve or eliminate symptoms. Some types can be followed with yearly echocardiograms instead of surgery if they are no longer causing symptoms.

==== Malignant tumors ====
Because they grow rapidly and invade important heart structures, they can be very difficult to treat. Unfortunately, most are not found until surgical removal is no longer possible. Chemotherapy and radiation therapy are sometimes used to try to slow tumor growth and improve symptoms (palliative care), but frequently they are ineffective for primary heart cancer.

=== Secondary tumours ===
In most cases, patients with heart metastases have advanced tumour disease, with the heart being only one of the many places involved in the generalised tumour spread. At that stage of the disease, the patients will likely have already undergone extensive chemotherapy, radiation therapy or surgical procedures. Cardiac treatment is usually confined to palliative measures.

== Notable cases ==
- Henry VIII's first wife Catherine of Aragon's death is believed to have resulted from heart cancer.
- Eric Carr, American musician, drummer of the rock band Kiss, died of heart cancer.
- Alexander Belov, Soviet basketball player.
- Mimi Lerner, Polish-American mezzo-soprano, died of a heart tumor.
- Ondřej Buchtela, Czech professional ice hockey defenceman, sarcoma of the heart muscle.
- Virgil Abloh, artistic director for Louis Vuitton and founder of fashion label Off White, died of cardiac angiosarcoma.
- Akkaphan Namart, Thai actor, was diagnosed with the disease in 2022. He died two years later.

== See also ==
- Primary tumors of the heart
