= Gun Pakdeevijit =

Thai actor

- กัญจน์ ภักดีวิจิตร
- Born: Gun Pakdeevijit; 24 December 1976 (age 49); Bangkok, Thailand
- Other names: Golf (nickname); Legendary Chicken Roaster
- Education: Kasetsart University Laboratory School
- Occupations: Actor; director; producer; singer; Youtuber
- Years active: 1998–present
- Relatives: Chalong Pakdeevijit (father); Cherd Pakdeevijit (younger brother); Boonjira Pakdeevijit (younger sister)

Gun Pakdeevijit (Thai: กัญจน์ ภักดีวิจิตร, RTGS: Kan Phakdiwichit; born 24 December 1976), nicknamed Golf, is a Thai TV actor, TV series director & producer, singer.

== Background ==
Pakdeevijit is the eldest son of a famous action film director Chalong Pakdeevijit. He completed his secondary education from Kasetsart University Laboratory School (โรงเรียนสาธิตแห่งมหาวิทยาลัยเกษตรศาสตร์), and graduated Sound Engineering from Australia.

In October 2022, he revealed that he was LGBT, when admitting to dating a guy who is younger than 20.

== Career ==
Pakdeevijit earned the alias "Legendary Chicken Roaster" (นักปิ้งไก่ในตำนาน) because there is usually a scene in his show with him roasting chicken in the jungle. He is often parodied in Thailand that even if he is not a Phra Ek (พระเอก; "male lead role"), he usually has a more prominent role than Phra Ek. This is because his films and television series are directed and produced by his father.

In addition, he is also a singer. He will be singing for a TV series under his father's film production.

In 2017, he turned to TV series produced under Channel 3.
