= Ondřej Buchtela =

Czech ice hockey player (1999–2020)

- Born: 8 November 1999 Ústí nad Labem, Czech Republic
- Died: 24 July 2020 (aged 20)
- Height: 6 ft 0 in (183 cm)
- Weight: 218 lb (99 kg; 15 st 8 lb)
- Position: Defenceman
- Shot: Right
- Played for: Piráti Chomutov
- Playing career: 2016–2020

Ondřej Buchtela (8 November 1999 – 24 July 2020) was a Czech professional ice hockey defenceman.

Buchtela made his professional debut for Piráti Chomutov during the 2016–17 Czech Extraliga season and played a total of 27 regular-season games for the team over three seasons. During his career, he had multiple loan spells in the 1st Czech Republic Hockey League with SK Trhači Kadaň, HC Stadion Litoměřice, HC Slovan Ústečtí Lvi and HC Benátky nad Jizerou. Buchtela played in the 2017 IIHF World U18 Championships for the Czech Republic.

Buchtela died on 24 July 2020 of heart cancer, aged 20.
