= The Prostitute =

Thai novel

- Author: Ko Surangkhanang
- Language: Thai
- Genre: Fiction
- Publication date: 1937
- Publication place: Thailand

Ying Khon Chua (Thai: หญิงคนชั่ว, lit. 'the wicked woman'), translated into English as The Prostitute, is a Thai novel by Ko Surangkhanang. First published in 1937, it initially caused controversy in Thailand's developing literary scene, as it featured a woman forced into prostitution as its protagonist. A positive review by Prince Chula Chakrabongse contributed to the book's success, and it has since been included in the list of 100 Books Thais Should Read sponsored by the Thailand Research Fund.

== Plot ==
Reun, an innocent young girl living in Thailand's countryside, is charmed by a big city pimp who seduces her into working as a prostitute in a brothel where she falls in love and becomes pregnant by a man of a higher class and background. The man abandons Ruen, not knowing she is carrying his offsping. Reun must then provide for herself and her child.
