= Never Grow Old =

"Never Grow Old" usually refers to an old Southern gospel song of the same name, technically called "Where We'll Never Grow Old", written by James Cleveland Moore, Sr. on April 22, 1914. It has been included on many religious-themed audio compilations, and has been covered by many singers, including Mae Lyons, Johnny Cash, Jim Reeves, Bill and Gloria Gather, the Carter Family, and Aretha Franklin. In 2008, Thai-American Singer Art Supawatt Purdy recorded an acoustic version for the soundtrack of the movie 'Soi Cowboy', one of the 61st Cannes Film Festival 'Un Certain Regard' Official Selection.

== Background ==
James Cleveland Moore, Sr. had intended to become a Baptist preacher. He was educated at Draketown Baptist Institute, Mercer University in Macon, Georgia, and the University of Florida. He received musical training under Benjamin B. Beale and J. Henry Showalter.

At 26 years old, while a seminary student at Mercer, Moore visited his hometown church to preach, Draketown Baptist Church. His father, Charles Robert Moore, had led the singing for years. Hearing his father's voice failing him, Moore knew that he would not hear his father sing much longer due to his father's advanced age.

After returning to school, Moore produced the hymn and dedicated his song as: "Dedicated to My Father and Mother." The song was not published until around 1930.

== Lyrics ==
VERSE 1:
I have heard of a land
On the faraway strand
'Tis a beautiful home of the soul
Built by Jesus on high
There we never shall die
'Tis a land where we never grow old.

CHORUS:
Never grow old [where we'll]
Never grow old
In a land where we'll never grow old
Never grow old [where we'll]
Never grow old
In a land where we'll never grow old.

VERSE 2:
In that beautiful home
Where we'll nevermore roam
We shall be in the sweet by and by
Happy praise to the King
Through eternity sing
'Tis a land where we never shall die.

VERSE 3:
When our work here is done
And the life-crown is won
And our troubles and trials are o'er
All our sorrow will end
And our voices will blend
With the loved ones who've gone on before.

== See also ==
- Eternal life (Christianity)
- Southern gospel
