= Sarawat Yai =

- Also known as: The Law Enforcement
- Genre: Action; Crime; Drama
- Based on: Sarawat Yai by Pol Gen Vasit Dejkunchorn
- Written by: Phukhao
- Directed by: Pholchaya Metha
- Starring: Kantapong Bumrungrak; Tussaneeya Karnsomnuch; Wathit Sopha; Ingfah Ketkham; Ornlene Sothiwanwongse; Art Supawatt Purdy
- Opening theme: "Pacified the Sky" (Thai: สยบฟ้า) by Panithi Leelapundit
- Ending theme: "You'll be the Last" (Thai: เธอจะเป็นคนสุดท้าย) by Surasak Chottinnawat
- Country of origin: Thailand
- Original language: Thai
- No. of episodes: 15

Production
- Executive producer: Nirattisai Kaljareuk
- Producer: Kahabodee Kaljareuk
- Production locations: Tha Maka Provincial Police Station, Amphoe Tha Maka, Kanchanaburi Province; Flat Federal Police Tung Song Hong, Tung Song Hong, Lak Si, Bangkok; Naresuan Camp, Amphoe Cha-am, Phetchaburi Province
- Running time: 120 minutes Fridays at 20:05, Saturdays, Sundays at 20:15 (ICT)
- Production companies: Dramagic Group, A Pasang Yasorn Co., Ltd.

Original release
- Network: Channel 7 HD
- Release: January 13 – February 17, 2019

Related
- Sentang Banterng; Praden Det 7 Si

Sarawat Yai (Thai: สารวัตรใหญ่; lit: Chief Inspector) is a 2019 Thai action/crime Television miniseries based on a 1989 popular Thai crime novel by Pol Gen Vasit Dejkunchorn and a remake of a 1994 miniseries of the same name. Written for television by Phukhao and directed by Pholchaya Metha, Sarawat Yai is produced by Dramagic Group, a Pasang Yasorn Company for Thai TV Ch. 7, and starring Kantapong Bumrungrak, Tussaneeya Karnsomnuch, Wathit Sopha, Ingfah Ketkham, Ornlene Sothiwanwongse, Nunthasai Pisalayabuth and Art Supawatt Purdy. Sarawat Yai 2019 marks the first time Ch.7 ex-leading man Art Supawatt Purdy takes on the role of the villain, starring as the corrupted Pol Maj Gen Anek.

Sarawat Yai (translates roughly as "Big Inspector") or internationally titled The Law Enforcement is one of the few television miniseries that gives a true reflection of the modern Thai society with an emphasis on The Royal Thai Police Force. The title is actually a play on words with double meaning, namely 'the big Inspector' and 'the Inspector named Yai'. This 15-episode 2019 version of Sarawat Yai airs on Channel 7 HD every Friday during the 8:05pm, Saturday and Sunday during the 8:15pm time slot, with the first episode premiering on Sunday January 13, 2019.

== Original version and controversy ==
The original version was produced by Kantana Group also for Thai TV Ch. 7 and directed by Nirattisai Kaljaruek, the now owner and managing director of Pasang Yasorn Co., Ltd., and starring Likit Ekmongkol, Monrudee Yamaphai and Yutthapichai "Dodo" Chanlekha. Well received by viewers and critics, Sarawat Yai 1994 version unexpectedly received top viewership ratings.

Based on a true story of a real life Thai police and written by a policeman, Sarawat Yai gave a very vivid detailed account of real events that happened by exposing and bringing to light the problems of corruption in the Thai police force in a way that had never been done before. Naturally, the Thai Police viewed this expose as an insult and began to protest. Soon the police initiated the campaign to ban the miniseries and demanded for channel 7 to stop broadcasting Sarawat Yai. Finally, after airing only half of its episodes, Ch. 7 suddenly took Sarawat Yai off the air, leaving the Thai television viewing audience puzzled as to how it ends. Many television miniseries enthusiasts wondered if the 2019 version will meet the same fate as its predecessor. In an interview with MSN.com, the leading man Es Kantapong said that he was also worried that his version may be banned from broadcasting since the production wrapped almost two years ago, but Ch. 7 had not put it on its prime time line-up in 2018. He added that he was quite relieved when he received news that Sarawat Yai 2019 version will go on air in January 2019.

== Plot ==
Yai Weroj, a young accomplished policeman is moved from the frontier to be the new chief inspector at Phra Lan Provincial Police Station, Phra Kamphaeng Province. Phra Lan is a remote area and full of illegal business and corruption in civil service circles. He tries to solve crimes and be a good role model for other policemen. He has Kampaeng, a beautiful wife who always supports him, as well as Pittayatorn, a greenhorn young policeman to assist him.

== Cast ==
- Kantapong Bumrungrak as Pol Maj Yai Weroj
- Tussaneeya Karnsomnuch as Kampaeng
- Wathit Sopha as Acting Pol Sub Lt Pittayatorn
- Ingfah Ketkham as Mattanee
- Ornlene Sothiwanwongse as Orathai
- Art Supawatt Purdy as Pol Maj Gen Anek, Commander Anek
- Nunthasai Pisalayabuth as Pol Col Sabanant
- Nukkid Boonthong as Sergeant Booncherd
- Surasak Chottinnawat as Pol Capt Kobkiat
- Wasu Sangsingkaew as Governor Pichet
- Praptpadol Suwanbang as Mogul Kakanand
- Anuwat Niwatawong as Mogul Noi
- Sumet Ong-art as Mogul Jaturon
- Pongsanart Vinsiri as Kamnan Chalongchok
- Puchisa Thanapat as Nawakun
- Worapot Chaem as Sergeant Pranote
- Rahtree Wittawat as Sister Juab
- Terdporn Manopaiboon as Soy milk old seller
- Thanayong Wongtrakun as Sergeant Chart (cameo)

== Reception ==
Sarawat Yai 2019 debut episode received the viewership rating of 6.9, according to the Nielsen Rating (Thailand). This number is considered to be high for prime time television miniseries. After the debut episode, Sarawat Yai ratings continued to climb upwards reaching 8.4 by episode 9 on February 3, 2019. According to TV Digital Watch website, the rating for the finale episode on February 17, 2019 peaked at 11.3, making 'Sarawat Yai' the first highest-rated primetime miniseries for Ch.7 this year.

=== Ratings ===
In the tables below, the blue numbers represent the highest ratings and the red numbers represent the lowest ratings.

Episode	Broadcast Date	AGB Ratings
Episode	Broadcast Date	Nationwide
1	January 13, 2019	6.92%
2	January 18, 2019	7.09%
3	January 19, 2019	7.70%
4	January 25, 2019	7.43%
5	January 26, 2019	7.22%
6	January 27, 2019	7.75%
7	February 1, 2019	7.10%
8	February 2, 2019	7.54%
9	February 3, 2019	8.38%
10	February 8, 2019	7.40%
11	February 9, 2019	7.71%
12	February 10, 2019	7.85%
13	February 15, 2019	9.30%
14	February 16, 2019	9.60%
15	February 17, 2019	11.30%
Average		8.02%

Note: Sunday January 20, 2019, no broadcast due to live 2019 AFC Asian Cup between China vs Thailand from United Arab Emirates.
