= Mick Tongraya =

Thai actor (born 1992)

Mik Thongraya
- มิกค์ ทองระย้า
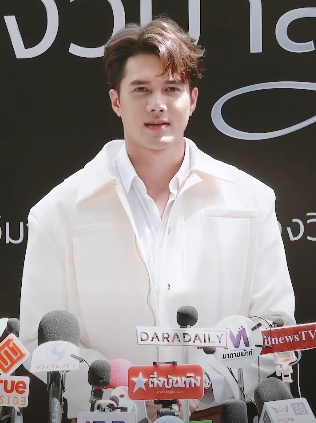
- Thongraya in 2022
- Born: Mik Thongraya; 28 November 1992 (age 33); Sao Hai, Thailand
- Other name: Mik Hansen
- Education: Journalism Ramkhamhaeng University
- Occupations: Actor; television host
- Years active: 2008–present
- Agent: Channel 7 (2009–present)
- Height: 190 cm (6 ft 3 in)
- Website: Official website

Mik Thongraya (Thai: มิกค์ ทองระย้า; born 28 November 1992) is a Thai actor. Currently, he is signed under Channel 7.

== Personal life ==
Thongraya is of Danish and Thai descent. He graduated from Ramkhamhaeng University. In 2018, he enlisted in the Royal Thai Air Force at Saraburi his birthplace.

== Career ==
Thongraya began his career by joining the "Dream Star Search" in 2008, winning the best new actor award. In 2010, he debuted in the drama Team Zah Tah Fun in a supporting role. After that, he acted in several dramas in supporting and main roles. In 2016, he was paired up with Stephany Auernig in the drama Fire Series: Talay Fai and with Pimprapa Tangprabhaporn in the drama Karn La Krang Neung Nai Hua Jai. Since then he has only played lead roles, mostly in dramas for Channel 7. He starred in Mussaya, where he paired up with Mookda Narinrak, and Paragit Ruk: Yuet Fah Ha Pigat Ruk, where he reunited with Stephany Auernig.

== Filmography ==
Key
†	Denotes drama that have not yet been released

=== Film ===
Year	Title	Role	Notes
2010	8E88 Fan Lanla	Mik	Debut film
2010	I Am Grandmother	Kai	
2016	Fear is Coming		Chinese film
2017	Friendsssss	Sense	
2017	Nai Kai Jeow	Win	Cameo appearance

=== Television series ===
Year	Title	Role	Network
2010	Team Zaa Tah Fun	Gai	Channel 7
2010–2011	Khun Chai Tum Raberd	Cherm	Channel 7
2011–2012	Horb Ruk Mah Hom Fah	Thanawat	Channel 7
2012	Look Poo Chai Mai Tapode	Teewa	Channel 7
2012	Ching Nang	Neua Fah	Channel 7
2013	Look Mai Lark See	Chayakun	Channel 7
2013	Suparboorut Ban Thung	Mai	Channel 7
2013–2014	Keut Hat Ta Krong Pi Pop	Phon	Channel 7
2014	Koo Hoo Koo Hean: Good Brother	Maek	Channel 7
2014–2015	Look Poo Chai Pan Dee	Suea	Channel 7
2015	Khat Cheuk	Boonsom	Channel 7
2015	Yot Manut Dap Thewada	Suea (Special appearance)	Channel 7
2015	Ta Pode Logun	Teewa	Channel 7
2016	The Fire Series: Talay Fai	Techin	Channel 7
2016	Karn La Krang Neung Nai Hua Jai	Daniel Wong	Channel 7
2016–2017	Petch Tud Peth	Yod	Channel 7
2016	Tai Rom Pra Baramee: Thang Kor Por	Daniel	Channel 7
2017	Nark Boon Song Krod	Song Krod	Channel 7
2017	Paragit Ruk Series: Niew Hua Jai Sood Glai Peun	Captain Karun Hanyotin	Channel 7
2017	Paragit Ruk Series: Mue Prab Jao Hua Jai	Captain Karun Hanyotin	Channel 7
2017	Mussaya	Lak Rattanamahasarn	Channel 7
2017	Paragit Ruk Series: Ratchawanee Tee Ruk	Captain Karun Hanyotin	Channel 7
2017	Paragit Ruk Series: Yeut Fah Ha Pigat Ruk	Captain Karun Hanyotin	Channel 7
2018	Jao Sao Jum Yorm	Kadethaen	Channel 7
2019	Mon Gard Bandan Ruk	Songklot	Channel 7
2020	Sapai Import	Don	Channel 7
2020	Jark Sadtroo Soo Hua Jai	Jett	Channel 7
2021	Talay Luang	Talay / Natee Wannapranont / "Tee"	Channel 7
2022	Sai Leurd Song Hua Jai	Tawanchay Seang-Arunpong (Jay)	Channel 7
2022	Buang Wimala	Gun	Channel 7
2023	Mekong	Dave	Channel 7
2025	Kom Faek	Saen Rachasee	

=== Hosting ===
Online

- 2022 : มากับมิกค์ EP.1 On Air YouTube:มากับมิกค์

== Discography ==
=== Soundtrack appearances ===
Year	Title	Notes
2016	"เพชรตัดเพชร (Phet Tud Phet)" (with Sukollawat Kanarot)	Phet Tud Phet OST
2017	"ภารกิจรัก (Love Mission)" (with Sukollawat Kanarot, Saran Sirilak & Akkaphan Namart)	Paragit Ruk Series OST

=== Advertising ===
Year	Thai title	Title	Notes	With
2018	เรนเจอร์ สเก้าท์ สุดจะทนฉุนไม่น้อย มิกค์ ทองระย้า โดนจิกกัดไม่ยั้ง ยาจุดกันยุง ควันน้อยไล่ยุงไกล			
2020	B-Quik เต็มที่เพื่อรถ เต็มร้อยเพื่อคุณ			
2020	แอร์กรี Gree เครื่องปรับอากาศ รุ่นใหม่ 2020 HD			
2020	บีเอสซี เซซะมิซอย นมถั่วเหลืองผสมงาดำ	BSC Soy Box Milk		
2020	Ranger scout เรนเจอร์ สเก้าท์ สเปรย์กำจัดยุงและแมลงสาบ 6 sec			
2020	อินโดคาเฟ่ กาแฟสำเร็จรูป	Indocafe Original Blend Instant Coffee		
2020	ผลิตภัณฑ์เครื่องสำอาง สกินแคร์ น้ำหอม CARING			Oranate D. Caballes
2020	ยาแคปซูลกระชายดำ ขาวละออ 100 แคปซูล	Krachaidum Compound Capsule : Khaolaor 100		
2020	รถยนต์มิตซูบิชิ	Mitsubishi Car		
2021	กระเทียมสกัดชนิดเม็ด อลิเซีย 5000 ขาวละออ	Khaolaor Alicia 5000 khaolaor		

== Awards and nominations ==
Year	Award	Category	Nominated work	Result	Ref.
2015	Si Thep Awards	Good People of the Land	—N/a	Won	
2017	11th OK! Awards	Man's Man	—N/a	Won	
2017	11th Kazz Awards	Popular Actor	The Fire Series: Talay Fai	Nominated	
2017	5th Thailand Headlines Person of The Year Awards	Culture and Entertainment – Actor	—N/a	Won	
2017	2nd Dara Inside Awards	Popular Lead Actor Award	The Fire Series: Talay Fai	Nominated	
2017	5th Ram Khamhaeng Inscription Awards	Great Gold of the Year	—N/a	Won	
2018	7th Daradaily The Great Awards	Best Actor in a Leading Role (Drama)	Mussaya	Nominated	
2018	4th Maya Awards	Charming Male Star Award	—N/a	Won	
