= Worarat Suwannarat =

Thai model (born 1977)

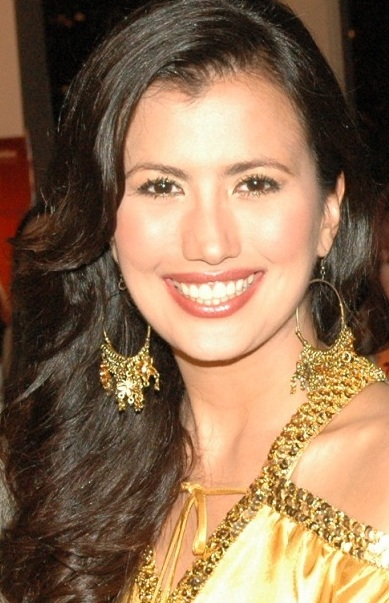
- Born: Emma Masterson; January 22, 1977 (age 49); Bangkok, Thailand
- Other name: Nong
- Education: Assumption University; Chulalongkorn University; University of Cambridge; University of Freiburg (Ph.D.)
- Occupations: Model; Actress; Television presenter
- Height: 1.70 m (5 ft 7 in)
- Beauty pageant titleholder
- Title: Miss Asia Pacific 1997
- Hair color: Dark brown
- Eye color: Dark brown
- Major competitions: Miss Thailand 1997 (1st Runner-Up); Miss Asia Pacific 1997 (Winner)

Emma Masterson, also known as Worarat Suwannarat (Thai: วรรัตน์ สุวรรณรัตน์, born 22 January 1977) is a Thai actress, model, and television presenter who was crowned Miss Asia Pacific 1997. She hosted talk show Sawasdee Bangkok and was an ambassador for the Tourism Authority of Thailand.

== Early life and education ==
Masterson was born in Bangkok but raised in Ireland to an Irish father and a Thai Irish mother. Despite being raised in Ireland, she is fluent in both English and Thai. She received her Bachelor's degree in Faculty of Business from Assumption University, with Principal’s Honor Roll, a Master's degree in Faculty of Liberal Arts, education of European Studies from Chulalongkorn University, with Principal’s Honor Roll, another Master's degree in Faculty of Philosophy, University of Cambridge, with Principal’s Honor Roll and a Ph.D. of Political Science from University of Freiburg, Germany.

== Pageantry ==
She was the first runner-up in the 1997 Miss Thailand pageant with the special award "Miss Popular Vote" from the audiences. She represented Thailand at the 1997 Miss Asia Pacific pageant held in Davao City, Philippines and won the competition, becoming the third Thai woman to capture the title. She also won the special award title Miss Best Smile.

== Actress ==
She starred in several Thai television soap opera, mostly as leading actress. Her most famous work is Angkor, an action series where she and Pete Thongchua lead the role, produced and directed by Chalong Pakdeevijit. The series achieved Thailand TV rating of 30, highest achieved by the director of the series. The three reunited in another action series Thong 5.

Year	Title	Role	Notes	Network
1999	Petch Ta Maew	Bussayarat	Leading role	Channel 5
1999	Ku Antrarai Dab Khrueng Chon	Princess	Leading role	Channel 7
2000	Angkor	Angkor	Leading role	Channel 7
2001	Thong 5	Tafa	Leading role	Channel 7
2002	Saphai Hi-So		Leading role	Channel 5
2002	Nang Man	Ananyata	Leading role	Channel 7
2003	Lek Yai Mai Keao Kho Aew Duew Khon	Nisa	Leading role	Channel 7
2005	Sueb-Sao-Rao-Rak	Nisa	Supporting role	Channel 7

Preceded by Gabriela Aguilar Chavarría	Miss Asia Pacific; 1997	Succeeded by Kisha Alvarado Murillo
