= Sammy Cowell =

Thai actress

- แซมมี่ เคาวเวลล์
- Born: Panthita Phoowijarn Cowell; October 8, 1991 (age 35); Bangkok, Thailand
- Other names: Dollacha Phoowijarn Cowell; Chanicha Cowell
- Occupations: Actress; model; fashion designer
- Years active: 2007 – present
- Agents: Channel 7 (2008–2020); Independent (2021-present)
- Height: 1.73 m (5 ft 8 in)

Sammy Cowell (Thai: แซมมี่ เคาวเวลล์; born October 8, 1991) is a Thai actress and model. She entered the entertainment industry by winning Thai Supermodel Contest 2007 and has worked in various TV dramas, movies and modeling works (commercials, photo shoots, runway walks) ever since. Her notable works are Nang Baeb Koke Gradone, Pleng Ruk Pha Puen Taek, Lueam Salab Lai, Fai Ruk Game Rohn, Ratchawanee Tee Ruk and Lhong Ngao Jun.

== Early life and education ==
Sammy Cowell was born to a British father, Samuel Derek Cowell, and a Thai mother, Pityanit. She has a half sister. She graduated with a Bachelor of Business Administration majoring in Human Resource Management from Ramkhamhaeng University.

The origin of the nickname Sammy comes from the word Sam, her father's name. Her older sister then added the word Mi to the end of the name until it became Sammy and has used this name in the entertainment industry.

== Career ==
Sammy began her career as a model in an ice cream commercial and later participated in the 2007 Thailand Supermodel Contest. She won the title at only 16 years old. Sammy was subsequently signed with Channel 7 Thailand. Her first drama was the sitcom "KuKik Prik Gub Gleur" and her first feature-length drama was "Suparb Burut Satan". As a rising star of that era, “Sammy” wasn’t posed to be a “heroine” or a “villain”, so her work was quite varied. Good and bad roles were intertwined, including Pob Pee Fah, Nang Greed, Tawan Yor Saeng, Sawan Saang, Bundai Dok Ruk and Lui. But the work that made her performance stand out was “Nang Baeb Koke Gradone” which made the highest ratings for 5 weeks in a row. In addition to acting as a villain, she switched between evening drama and post-news drama.

After 2014 with her proven acting potential over the years, Sammy stepped up to be the front lead actress of Channel 7 and was placed in big drama projects, making her a “drama goddess”. Her works at this time are countless. From Lueam Salab Lai, Fai Ruk Game Rohn, Ratchawanee Tee Ruk, Wilok Lhong Lom, Sanaeha Maya, Lhong Ngao Jun, Suparburoot Chao Din, Talay Luang and Plerng Prissana. Throughout her time as a Channel 7 exclusive actress, she had almost all the leading actors and acted in all drama genres. At the end of 2020, when her contract with Channel 7 ended, Sammy chose the path of becoming an independent actress and not affiliated to any channel.

== Filmography ==
=== TV Drama ===
Year	Title	Role	Network	Notes
2008–2015	KuKik Prik Gub Gleur	Tonaor	Channel 7	sitcom
2008	Suparb Burut Satan	Deunmesa	Channel 7	support role
2008	Plikh Fah Lah Tawan	Sailom	Channel 7	support role
2009	Pob Pee Fah	Palin / Princess Mankaew	Channel 7	
2009	Nang Greed	Yosita	Channel 7	support role
2010	Tawan Yor Saeng	Prommit	Channel 7	support role
2010	Sawan Saang	Dararai / Dao	Channel 7	support role
2011	Bundai Dok Ruk	Meekrob	Channel 7	
2011	Lui	Nott	Channel 7	support role
2012	Chun Ruk Tur Na	Praewpailin	Channel 7	support role
2012	Nang Baeb Koke Gradone	E-lanoi / Laura	Channel 7	
2012	Doot Tawan Dang Pupah	Nannapat / Pat	Channel 7	support role
2013	Ruk Roy Lan	Fahsai	Channel 7	
2013	Fai Huan	Bupha	Channel 7	
2013	Fah Jarod Sai	Princess Chalida	Channel 7	guest role
2013	Bodyguard Sao	Praeploy	Channel 7	
2014	Pleng Ruk Pha Puen Taek	Wanlapa	Channel 7	
2015	Lueam Salab Lai	Palai	Channel 7	
2016	Fire Series: Fai Ruk Game Rohn	Piraya / Pin	Channel 7	
2016	Fire Series: Talay Fai	Piraya / Pin	Channel 7	guest role
2017	Paragit Ruk Series : Ratchawanee Tee Ruk	Praewpun / Preaw	Channel 7	
2017	Paragit Ruk Series: Yeut Fah Ha Pigat Ruk	Praewpun / Preaw	Channel 7	guest role
2018	Wilok Lhong Lom	Poomwaree / Nuan	Channel 7	
2018	Sanaeha Maya	Plengpin	Channel 7	
2019	Lhong Ngao Jun	Pimchanok / Pim	Channel 7	
2019	Suparburoot Chao Din	Pakawadee / Nudee	Channel 7	
2021	Talay Luang	Moya	Channel 7	
2021	Plerng Prissana	Rinlada / Rin	Channel 7	
2021	Unhappy Birthday	Meena	Channel One 31	
2022	Sai Roong	Methini / May	Channel One 31	

=== Online drama ===
Year	Title	Role
2012	Love Me Love My Food	Cherry

=== Film ===
Year	Title	Role	With
2017	Love Rain	Som	Kitkong Khamkrith
2020	Oh My God Father	Pranee Cheewakul (Bew)	Thanawat Wattanaputi & Chantavit Dhanasevi
2021	Dark World	Fear	Due Arisara Thongborisut, Raknapak Wongtanatat, Yuttana Puangklang & Chaiyapol Julien Poupart

=== Variety and Talk Shows ===
Year	Title	Channel
2007	This is Mo Chit: Pancake Khemanit with Thai Supermodel 2007	Channel 7
2009	Game Phan Na Program	Channel 7
2012	This is Mo Chit: Sammy, Yok and Gam	Channel 7
2012	Yesterday was still sweet: 'Nang Baeb Koke Gradone'	Channel 7
2013	Starburst... Sammy Pantita	Channel 7
2013	This is Mo Chit: Golf-Sammy, Be mesmerized by the charm of Bali	Channel 7
2013	Yesterday was still sweet: Sammy, Tubtim, Off and Tle	Channel 7
2013	Janpandao (Map Weerakanit + Sammy Donlacha)	Channel 7
2014	Janpandao (Golf Anuwat + Sammy Cowell)	Channel 7
2015	This is Mo Chit: Go North with Sammy - Thisa	Channel 7
2016	Yesterday was still sweet: Thanwa & Sammy	Channel 7
2017	Who are you talking to? Hot heroine 'Sammy Cowell'	Channel 7
2017	Spotlight on TV EP.4	Channel 7
2018	Spotlight on TV EP.24	Channel 7
2018	Hey Man, Golden Tambourine Show	Channel 7
2018	Million Dollar Superstar Kik Du: Sammy Cowell	Channel 7
2019	MISSION 7: Fabulous Summer Style "Sammy-Grace"	Channel 7
2019	Hello Superstar: Sammy Cowell	Channel 7
2019	Exclusive Interview: Sammy Cowell	Maya Channel
2020	Star Cam Ep.19	Channel 7
2020	The Driver EP.100	Line TV
2021	Thairath Talk: Sammy Cowell	Thairath TV Channel 32
2021	The Wall Song Ep.68	Workpoint Entertainment
2022	Nine Entertainment Exclusive Talk : Sammy Cowell	Channel 9 MCOT HD
2022	Daily Show EP.134	Channel One 31
2022	Entertainment Day Talk EP.12	Channel One 31
2022	Talk with Toey EP.80	Channel GMM 25
2023	The Wall Song Ep.138	Workpoint Entertainment

=== Commercial ===
- Citra
- Spy Wine Cooler
- VSlim Coffee
- The8 Health
- Mistine
- B'me by Wacoal
- Kirinatu
- Nivea

== Discography ==
=== OST ===
Year	Song title	Drama	With
2012	Nang Baeb Koke Gradone (Khok Kradon Model)	Nang Baeb Koke Gradone	Yok Thunyagun Thanakittananon & Gam Gavintra Photijak
2013	Pleng Ruk Roy Lahn (100 Million Love Songs)	Ruk Roy Laan	Golf Anuwat Choocherdratana
2013	Fai Pratana (Song of Desire)	Fai Huan	
2014	Rao Ruk Gun Reu Kae Fun Bpai (Are We in Love or Are We Just Dreaming?)	Pleng Ruk Pha Puen Taek	Porshe Saran Sirilak
2014	Khon Dung Leum Lang Khwai (Celebrities forget the back of the buffalo)	Pleng Ruk Pha Puen Taek	
2018	Luang Kho Ngu Hao (Deep in the Cobra's Neck)	Sanaeha Maya	

=== Song Covers ===
Year	Song title	With
2021	Khuchiwit (Life Partner)	Ohm Cocktail
2023	Wad pa hla? (Test Me)	Porshe Saran Sirilak & Thee Wanichnunthatada

=== Music Video Appearances ===
Year	Song title	Artist
2018	Mhong (Look)	Daboyway Ft. Twopee
2019	Sonklìn (Tuberose)	Nivea x Genie Records
2020	Khrang hnung ni chiwit (Once In A Life Time)	Weir Sukollawat & Som Marie
2021	Phinong chub paeng thod (Fried Breaded Brothers)	San Sansansilp

== Awards ==
Year	Award Ceremony	Category	Nominated work	Result
2007	Thai Supermodel Contest	Thai Supermodel 2007	—N/a	Won
2007	Thai Supermodel Contest	Special Prize: Select Supermodel	—N/a	Won
2013	Star's Light Awards	Sexy Model of the Year	—N/a	Won
2015	Star's Light Awards	Sexy Model of the Year	—N/a	Won
2016	FHM 100 Sexiest Women in the World	Sexiest Woman of the Year 2015-2016	—N/a	Won
2016	Siam Dara Awards	Sexy Star	—N/a	Won
2017	Star's Light Awards	Sexiest Woman of the Year	—N/a	Won
2018	Siam Ganesha Awards	Role Model of Society - Actress	—N/a	Won
2019	Council of Creative Artists Society - Outstanding Artists Awards	Popular Actress	—N/a	Won
2019	Thailand Headlines Person of the Year Awards	Culture and Entertainment - Actress	—N/a	Won
2021	30th Thailand National Film Association Awards	Outstanding Performance by an Actress in a Supporting Role	Dark World	Nominated
