= Mekong (TV series) =

- Genre: Action / Adventure; Drama; Fantasy
- Based on: Mekong by Paul Adirex
- Written by: Dragon Writer Co., Ltd.
- Directed by: Oliver Bever
- Starring: Mik Thongraya; Louis Hesse; Tussaneeya Karnsomnut; Saranya Chunhasart
- Country of origin: Thailand
- Original language: Thai
- No. of episodes: 34

Production
- Producers: Oliver Bever; Pichet Sriracha
- Running time: 60 minutes
- Production companies: Nine Bever Films Co., Ltd.

Original release
- Network: Channel 7 HD
- Release: November 6, 2023 – January 4, 2024

Related
- Mekong (2001 TV series)

Mekong (Thai: แม่โขง, pronounced [mɛ̂ː kʰǒːŋ]) is a 2023 Thai television series in the genres of action drama, adventure and fantasy. It airs on Channel 7 HD from Monday to Thursday at 8:40 p.m. (ICT) for one hour each day. As originally scheduled, it ended on January 2, 2024, but Channel 7 brought the old series Samee Chua Kuen to air instead for two hours, so the ending date was moved to January 4, 2024 instead.

The series based on a 1995 novel by Paul Adirex and a remake of a 2001 series of the same name.

The series is a story about searching for American soldiers lost in the Vietnam War, the Phuri tribe, and the mythical serpent Phaya Nak, which is said to be protecting the kingdom.

== Plot ==
Dave, a former special forces officer, and his partner, Draco, want to find answers to their questions about the Phaya Nak, a woman, a hidden city that Dave often dreams about when he sleeps, and a mission to build a bridge across the Mekong that is threatened by international drug-trafficking organization.

As a result, they meet Dr. Kim, a young anthropologist who might be the one to lead them to the answers to their questions, beginning a journey involving mysteries from the tutelary of the Mekong, Phaya Nak.

== Cast ==
=== Main ===
- Mik Thongraya as Dave Sean
- Louis Hesse as Draco
- Tussaneeya Karnsomnut as Dr. Kim
- Saranya Chunhasart as Kwanta / Phailin / Sue Davenport
- Pusana Buangam as Wisay

=== Supporting ===
- Panraphon Wisitwatcharamongkol as Khun Sang
- Chartchai Ngamsan as Venerable Vasuki
- Wayne Falconer as Boontan
- Khema Withee as Boontong
- Patson Sarindu as John
- Sarut Suwanpakdee as Aung Lee
- Wiphop Bangyeekhan as Gong-in
- Ophaphoom Chitaphan as Puchong
- Chatchapol Kulsiriwuthichai as Kongrid
- Pichet Sriracha as Samran
- Dina Pophring as Usa
- Vanessa Bever as Siri
- Asanai Thetthawong as Guy
- Norathep Chaowiwat as Jua
- Chalermporn Pumpanwong as Termchai
- Patrick Forstner as Nick
- Amidou Johnson as Sam White
- Chatrawat Ratanawong as Chiya
- Voratanapot Tuntiviriyangkul as Saen
- Nichkul Pradubmooksiri as Suchart
- Kiattipan Chimchom as Kam-lai
- Sakchai Yukhachen as Plaew
- Chanakarn Sawatdimongkol as Sairak
- Naovarat Suesat as Sudjai
- Jakthip Tongthip as Headman Saen
- Eak Thanakorn as Singha
- Udon Pansing as Pan
- Niwet Kanthairat as Tian (guest)

== Original soundtrack ==
- "Mai Yon Klap" (ไม่ย้อนกลับ; "No Return"), opening theme by Songkran
- "Kan Khon Phop Khrang Sutthai" (การค้นพบครั้งสุดท้าย; "Final Discovery"), ending theme by Aek Season Five

== Production ==
The director and one of the producers of Mekong, Oliver Bever, was among those who starred in the 2001 version. He said that the current version is the most faithful to the novel, although some scenes have been added. Mekong is based on the novel of the same name by former politician and writer Pongpol Adireksarn (under the pen name Paul Adirex), who is a Phaya Nak believer.

Two CG production houses, with a total team of 40 people, were responsible for creating the image of Phaya Nak.

Bever also named Phaya Nak as the first leading role character.

== Reception and criticism ==
When it was released, it was not get ahead as it could have been, the highest rating was only 4.3 for the penultimate episode. The final episode's rating was 3.9. One fan of Channel 7 has announced that he does not want to watch this series. Other criticisms of the show are that the CG is unrealistic, that the story progression is not entertaining, that the acting of the performers was not up to par, as well as that the scene in which the character Dave catches Phaya Nak with a lasso is unrealistic, although some have said that the scene is entertaining.

== See also ==
- Phaya Nak
