= Dome Thong =

- Also known as: The Dome of Mystery
- Genre: Drama; Thriller; Mystery; Supernatural
- Based on: Dome Thong by Varapa
- Written by: Pawit
- Directed by: Nontanan Thunyasirisuph
- Starring: Tussaneeya Karnsomnuch; Veeraparb Suparbpaiboon; Duangdao Jarujinda; Chawallakorn Wanthanapisitkul
- Theme music composer: Chitpong Treemas
- Opening theme: "Rak Niran" (Eternal Love) by Tussaneeya Karnsomnuch & Chitpong Treemas
- Ending theme: "Rak Niran" by Tussaneeya Karnsomnuch & Veeraparb Suparbpaiboon (only episode 1 & 18) "Nang Kruan" (The Lady's Lament) by Tussaneeya Karnsomnuch (since episode 15–17)
- Country of origin: Thailand
- Original language: Thai
- No. of episodes: 18

Production
- Executive producer: Pairat Sungwaributr
- Producer: Sayom Sungwaributr
- Production locations: Bangkok, Lat Lum Kaeo, Pathum Thani, Khao Yai, Rayong, Thailand
- Running time: 120 minutes Mondays, Tuesdays at 20:30 (ICT)
- Production companies: Bangkok Broadcasting & T.V. Co., Ltd; Dida Video Production

Original release
- Network: Channel 7
- Release: June 10 – August 6, 2013

Related
- Evening News: Second Edition; Praden Det 7 Si

Dome Thong (Thai: โดมทอง; RTGS: Dome-Thong; lit: Golden Dome; international title: The Dome of Mystery ) is a Thai television series or lakorn. It remake from a 1999 lakorn of the same name (lead role by Sarunyu Wongkrachang).

== Summary ==
Virongrong or Plubplung (a lily flower in Thai word) is a young Bangkokian girl who has just returned from studying in the United States. She travels to Dome Thong, a vast mansion in a remote location, where she encounters a mysterious and unsettling world. The people who live there behave strangely, and the mansion itself seems to conceal a dark secret.

One night, she sees a mysterious man in a tuxedo riding in a carriage. He stops in front of her bedroom window and points toward the dome atop the mansion. From then on, on every night of the full moon, the mysterious man appears in the same place, while eerie Thai music can be heard coming from the dome.

Determined to uncover the truth, Virongrong begins investigating on her own, despite a strict prohibition against going up to the top of the dome. Before long, she discovers that the truth behind all the strange occurrences is ultimately a tragic one—and that it is connected to her own past.

== Cast ==
Main cast

- Tussaneeya Karnsomnuch as Virongrong (present) and Plubplung (past) (first her lead role)
- Veeraparb Suparbpaiboon as Adit Sirodom or Khun Rop (present) and Chao Phraya Sorasak Krai Narong (past)
- Duangdao Jarujinda as Than Phu Ying Montha Sirodom (present)
- Chawallakorn Wanthanapisitkul as Saengkae
- Gavintra Photijak as Usa
- Karnklao Duaysianklao as Pinthong
- Borvornpoch Jaikunta as Aniruth
- Phoomphadit Nittayaros as Phansoon

Supporting cast

- Pichayadon Peungphan as Pitch
- Weerakaniz Karnwatanagool as Chao Phuthai
- Kawita Rodkerd as Chao Lanna
- Kanjana Jindawat as Suraphee
- Noi Po-ngam as Urai
- Vajira Peamsuriya as Ob-om
- Ampha Poosith as Nang Pis
- Runglawan Thonahongsa as Buakam
- Krailad Kriangkrai as Nai Som
- Passorn Boonyakiart as Khun Ying Kaew
- Tin Settachoke as Hr. Poj

Cameo appearances

- Chiranan Manochaem as Than Phu Ying Sorasak Krai Narong or Than Phu Ying Montha Sirodom in the past
- Prab Yuttapichai as Nai Prom
- Porjade Kaenpetch as Nai Phan
- Kanjanaporn Plodpai as Khun Prang

== Related Productions ==
=== 1981 television series ===
The first adaptation of Varapa's novel was released in 1981, after the novel was first published in book form in 1977. The television series was directed by Suprawat Pattamasoot and produced by Maria Ketlekha. It was broadcast every Monday to Friday from 6:00 PM to 6:30 PM on Channel 3 (Thailand).

Main Cast

- Nath Phuwanai as Adit Sirodom or Khun Rop (present) and Chao Phraya Sorasak Krai Narong (past)
- Mayura Tanabut as Virongrong (present) and Plubplung (past)
- Metta Rungrat as Than Phu Ying Montha Sirodom (present)
- Anchalee Chaisiri as Usa
- Supannee Jittiang as Saengkae

=== 1999 television series ===
In 1999, the television series based on Varapa's novel was released, broadcast every Friday to Sunday from 8:20 PM to 10:20 PM on Channel 7 (Thailand). Directed by Samruay Rakchat.

Main Cast

- Sarunyu Wongkrachang as Adit Sirodom or Khun Rop (present) and Chao Phraya Sorasak Krai Narong (past)
- Natharika Thamapreedanan as Virongrong (present) and Plubplung (past)
- Marasri Issarangkul na Ayutthaya as Than Phu Ying Montha Sirodom (present)
- Kochakorn Nimakorn as Usa
- Suwajanee Chaimusik as Saengkae

== See more ==
- Phi Tai Hong
