= Suea Sung Fah II: Payak Payong =

- Also known as: Legend of Tiger II - The Invincible
- Genre: Action; Gangster; Fantasy; Sorcery
- Based on: Suea Sung Fah II: Payak Payong by Petch Nam Neung
- Written by: Dao Nuea
- Directed by: Anuwat Thanomrod
- Starring: Kelly Tanapat; Winai Kraibutr; Wongsakorn Poramathakorn; Tisanart Sornsuek
- Opening theme: "Luerk Sak Tang" by Nawapol Puvadol
- Ending theme: "Ruk Krung Raek" by Wongsakorn Poramathakorn
- Country of origin: Thailand
- Original language: Thai
- No. of episodes: 22

Production
- Executive producer: Somsook Kaljaruek
- Production location: Thailand
- Running time: 120 minutes (per episode)
- Production companies: Bangkok Broadcasting & T.V. Co., Ltd; Kantana Group

Original release
- Network: Channel 7
- Release: January 30 – April 11, 2013

Related
- Evening News: Second Edition; Praden Det 7 Si; Suea Sung Fah (2011); Satja Nai Chum Joan (Suea Sung Fah III) (2022)

Suea Sung Fah II: Payak Payong (Thai: เสือสั่งฟ้า 2 พยัคฆ์ผยอง; lit: The Tiger Commands the Heaven II: Tiger’s Swagger; English title: Legend of Tiger II - The Invincible) is a Thai TV series or lakorn aired on Thailand's Channel 7 from January 30 to April 11, 2013 on Wednesdays and Thursdays at 20:30 for 22 episodes. It sequel of Suea Sung Fah in 2011.

== Synopsis ==
In 1982, Bangkok celebrates the 200th anniversary, The famous gangsters during the reign of King Rama V has resurrected. Sua Han must comeback to be young again, to fight with them.

== Cast ==
Role	Actor
Suea Han Pan Singha (Tiger Han)	Kelly Tanapat
Khun Chote Hang Tung Phra Kan (Khun Chote of Phra Kan Field)	Winai Kraibutr
Kla Pan Singha	Wongsakorn Poramathakorn
Kraten	Sine Jaroenpura
Rajawadee	Tisanart Sornsuek
Phuchit	Arnus Rapanit
Khaneungnij	Nattasha Nauljam
Sriwan	Gavintra Photijak
Suea Tab (Tiger Tab)	Arucha Tosawat
Pol.Maj.Gen. Yingyoth Pairee Pai	Chartchai Ngamsan
Ngamta	Amena Pinit
Arjarn Yod (Necromancer Yod)	Ekapan Bunluerit
Suea Dum (Tiger Dum)	Jirakit Suwannapap
Suea Tai (Tiger Tai)	Jinna Jomkhanngoen
