= Suea Sung Fah =

2011 Thai television series

- Also known as: Legend of the Tiger
- Thai: เสือสั่งฟ้า
- Genre: Action; gangster; fantasy; sorcery
- Based on: Suea Sung Fah by Petch Nam Neung
- Screenplay by: Dao Nuea
- Directed by: Anuwat Thanomrod
- Starring: Ek Rangsiroj; Kelly Tanapat; Chanapol Sataya; Chartchai Ngamsan
- Opening theme: "Suea Sung Fah" by Ek Rangsiroj
- Ending theme: "Suea Sung Fah" by Ek Rangsiroj
- Country of origin: Thailand
- Original language: Thai
- No. of episodes: 19

Production
- Executive producer: Somsook Kaljaruek
- Producer: Surang Prempree
- Production location: Thailand
- Running time: 120 minutes (per episode)
- Production companies: Channel 7; Kantana

Original release
- Network: Channel 7
- Release: 25 August – 27 October 2011

Related
- Evening News: Second Edition; Praden Det 7 Si; Suea Sung Fah II: Payak Payong (2013)

Suea Sung Fah (Thai: เสือสั่งฟ้า; lit: "The Tiger Commands the Heaven") a.k.a. Legend of the Tiger is Thai TV series or lakorn aired on Thailand's Channel 7 from August 25 to October 27, 2011 on Wednesdays and Thursdays at 20:30 for 19 episodes.

The word "Suea" (เสือ) in Thai means "panther" or "tiger" or implied meaning may people with courageous minds or bandit.

== Synopsis ==
In 1957, Thailand, after World War II gangsters abound. The gangsters clashed with the police with various deadly weapons and black magic spells.

== Cast ==
Role	Actor
Suea Mek Ban Phaya Fai (Tiger Mek of Phaya Fai Village)	Ek Rangsiroj
Suea Han Pan Singha (Tiger Han)	Kelly Tanapat
Pol.Capt. Petch Pairee Pai	Chanapol Sataya
Pol.Maj.Gen. Yingyoth Pairee Pai	Chartchai Ngamsan
Ms.Darin	Pariyachat Limthammahisorn
Kraten	Kanyapat Tanunchaikan
Kesinee	Sinitta Boonyasak
Saijai	Buntita Thanwisate
Suea Tab (Tiger Tab)	Arucha Tosawat
Ming	Saicheer Wongwirot
Arjarn In (Necromancer In)	Chumphorn Thepphithak
Luang Pu Boontha (Grandfather Boontha)	Yodchay Meksuwan
Sriwan	Gavintra Photijak

== Rating ==
When it was released, it was very popular. Especially in the finale, the ratings reached 21.8, the highest in 2011, and ranked # 1 throughout the 9 weeks of the broadcast, also voted as the 8th best TV series of the year from the Pantip.com
