= Rangsiroj Panpeng =

Thai actor

- รังสิโรจน์ พันธุ์เพ็ง
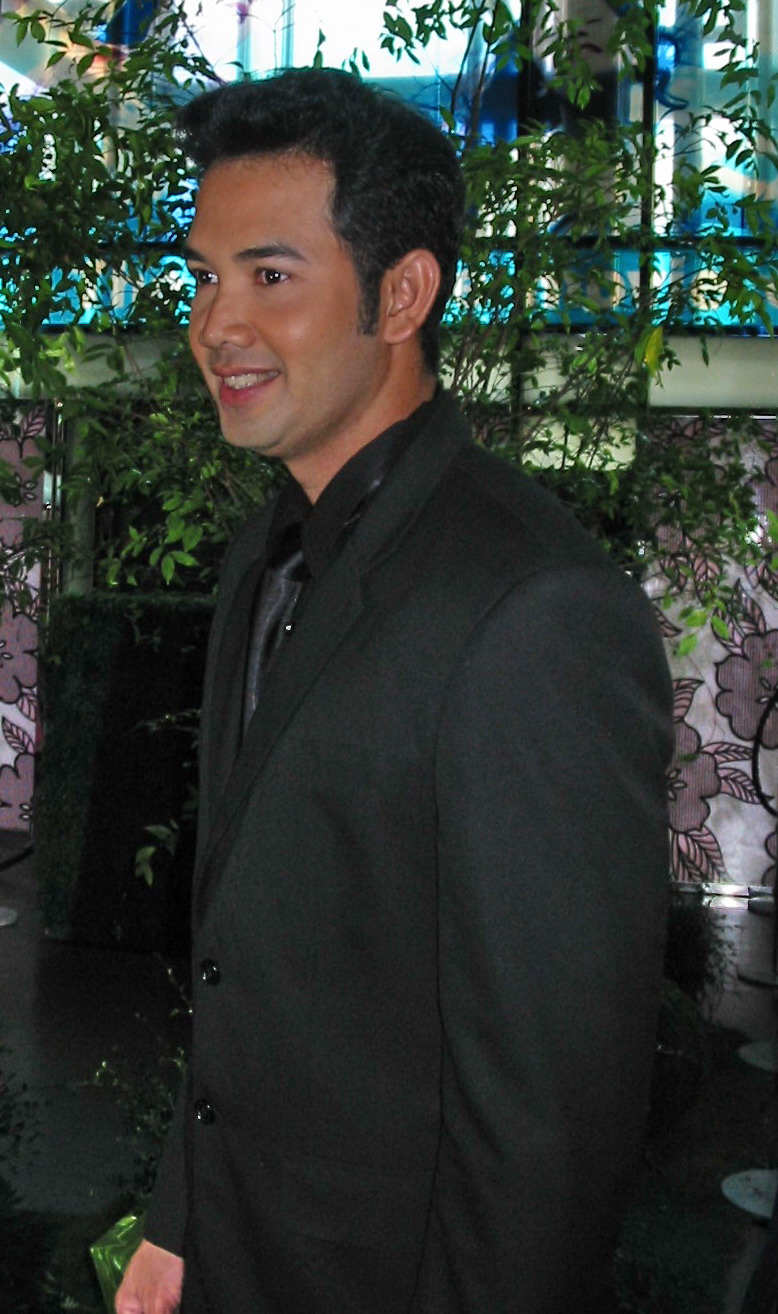
- Born: September 13, 1974 (age 51); Bang Ban, Ayutthaya, Thailand
- Other names: Ek Rangsiroj; Worapoj Panpeng
- Occupations: Actor; singer; songwriter
- Years active: 1997–present

Rangsiroj Panpeng, also affectionately known as Ek Rangsiroj (Thai: รังสิโรจน์ พันธุ์เพ็ง, เอก รังสิโรจน์; born: September 13, 1974 in Amphoe Bang Ban, Ayutthaya Province) is a Thai actor under Channel 7.

== Biography & career ==
Rangsiroj was born into a poor family in Ayutthaya Province. Due to his family's hardship, he lived at Wat Senasanaram as a temple boy from the age of 15. At 18, he began playing music in pubs. During his years at the temple, he performed the usual duties of a temple boy, such as serving monks during their early morning alms rounds, until he completed his studies at around 22–23 years old. Eventually, he entered show business, starting out as a model.

He is often cast in strong, masculine roles, and has frequently starred in dramas directed by Chalong Pakdeevijit, as well as in Angkor 2, Thong 9, Sao 5, and Suea Sung Fah.

In addition, he is also a songwriter and has performed theme songs for Channel 7 dramas.

== Filmography ==
Television dramas

Year	Title	Role	Note
1997	Chamloei Rak	Lomboon	
2005	Angkor 2	Pol.Maj. Akkarapoln	
2006	Lek Lai	Kom	
2007	Fhon Nuea	Pol.Capt. Chart Choengchai	
2007	Chum Phae	Pol.Capt. Chaiyo Veeraphol	
2008	Thong 9	Krish	
2008	Arnupap Pho Khun Ram Khamhaeng	Pho Khun Sri Indraditya	(mini-series)
2009	Sao 5	Deaw Somdej	
2010	Mae Sri Prai	Prachan	
2011	Suea Sung Fah	Suea Mek Ban Phaya Fai	
2011	Sao 5 : Thapthim Siam	Deaw Somdej	
2012	Suea Saming	Suea Jai	
2013	Yom Pha Ban Chao Kha	Yama	(drama series)
2013	Luerd Chao Phraya	Saming	
2014	Pleng Rak Pa Puen Taek	Pleung Phaya Fai	
2015	Phaya Sok	Chatree	
2016	Thong 10	Pupah	
2016	Norah	Teaw Thongterm	
2016	Yom Pha Ban Chao Kha	Yama	(season 2)
2017	Khon Rerng Muang	Khun Phra Veth	
2017	Tulip Thong	Phum Phatthanayuth	
2018	Jao Saming	Yongtamu	

Films

Year	Title	Role	With
2007	The Siam Renaissance	Luang Akkaratape Worakhan	Florence Vanida Faivre
2012	Mae Nak 3D	Phi Mak	Bongkoj Khongmalai
