= Kanha Khiangsiri =

Thai novelist

Kanha Khiangsiri กัณหา เคียงศิริ
- Born: 26 February 1912
- Died: 23 June 1999 (aged 87)
- Citizenship: Thai
- Occupation: Writer
- Writing career
- Pen name: Ko Surangkhanang; K. Surangkhanang
- Language: Thai
- Notable works: The Prostitute (1937); Ban Sai Thong (1950)

Kanha Khiangsiri (Thai: กัณหา เคียงศิริ, also spelled Khiengsiri; 26 February 1912 – 23 June 1999), née Chuen Watthanaphat (ชื้น วรรธนะภัฏ), was a Thai novelist. Writing under the pen name K. Surangkhanang (ก.สุรางคนางค์), her 45 novels include the highly popular Ban Sai Thong and the influential The Prostitute (Ying Khon Chua), which reflected issues in Thailand's developing modern society. She was named a National Artist in literature in 1986.
