= Akkaphan Namart =

Thai actor (1985–2024)

Akapan Namatra
- อรรคพันธ์ นะมาตร์
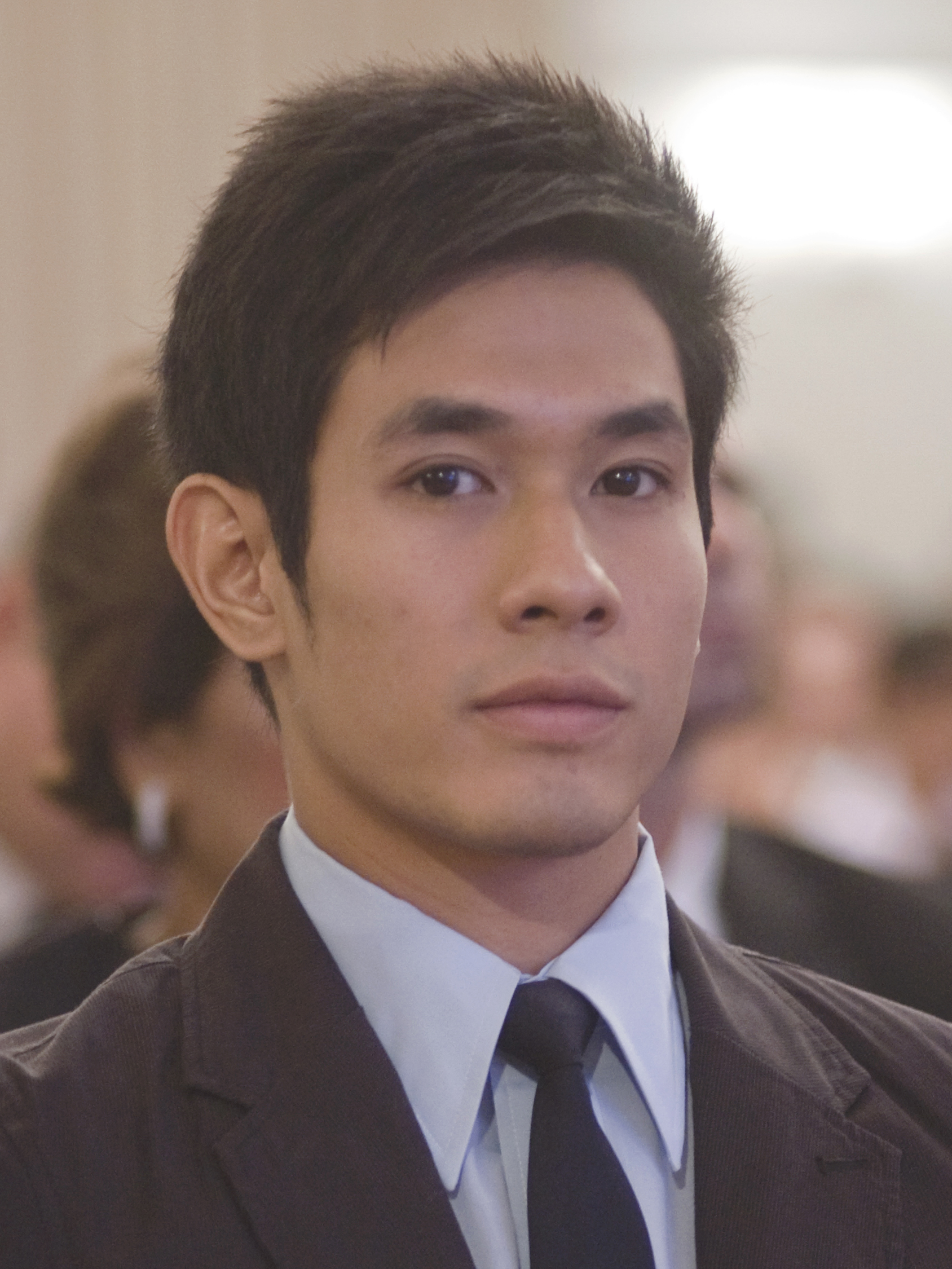
- Akkaphan in 2010
- Born: Akaphan Namatra; 28 January 1985; Bangkok, Thailand
- Died: 21 September 2024 (aged 39); Camillian Hospital, Bangkok, Thailand
- Occupation: Actor
- Agents: Polyplus (2008–2013); Channel 7 (2014–2024)
- Height: 1.85 m (6 ft 1 in)
- Spouse: Daria Shevruk (m.2024)

Akapan Namatra (Thai: อรรคพันธ์ นะมาตร์; RTGS: Akkhaphan Namat, 28 January 1985 – 22 September 2024) was a Thai actor. Namart graduated from Bangkok University. He made his debut on television in Ruk Sorn Kaen (2008) before his first role in film in Coffee Please (2013). He has starred in Thai dramas such as Mon Ruk Kao Tom Mud (2009), Sapai Glai Peun Tiang (2009), Sao Chai Hi-Tech (2010). In October 2022, he was diagnosed with heart cancer.

== Early life and education ==
Akaphan Namatra was born in Bangkok, Thailand on 28 January 1985, as the older of two siblings. He received his primary education from Darakarm school, while receiving secondary education from Sathit Mahawitayalai Ramkhamhaeng. He later graduated from the University of Bangkok in the Faculty of Communication Arts, majoring in advertising.

== Personal life and death ==
Akapan was diagnosed with stage 2–3 heart cancer in October 2022, suffering from a 12 cm tumor. As a result of his poor health, he paused all of his entertainment projects including an upcoming film titled Roy Rak Roi Sin. Subsequently, he underwent five chemotherapy sessions. On 31 January 2023, he was hospitalized for surgery, where it was discovered he also had two additional tumors in his lungs. It was later revealed on 9 July that his condition was improving.

Akapan died from the disease on 21 September 2024. He was 39.

== Filmography ==
=== Television ===
Year	Channel	Title	Role	Notes
2008	Ch. 3	Ruk Sorn Kaen	Tonwah	Minor role
2008	Ch.7	Jao Ying Lum Sing		
2009	Ch.3	Mon Ruk Kao Tom Mud (2009)	Laithai	
2009	Ch.3	Sapai Glai Peun Tiang	Pat	
2010	Ch.7	Prajan Lai Payak	Wayu	
2010	Ch.7	Sao Chai Hi-Tech	Nol Ratsameemarn	
2011	Ch.7	Bundai Dok Ruk	Thoop/Thien	Play as twins brother.
2011	Ch.7	Tawee Pope	Khunluang Akarathep Warakorn	
2012	Ch.3	Rak Ork Akard	Jaokhun	
2012	Ch.7	Ching Nang	Pupah	
2012	Ch.7	Ubathteehet 2012	Aroom	
2013	Ch.7	Wan Nee Tee Ror Khoi 2013	Jao Sun / Prince NahPingMaThep	
2014	Ch.7	Jao Sao Salatan	Chanon (Non)	
2014	Ch.7	Hua Jai Teuan	Park/Raj Rutchapbumi	
2015	Ch.7	Dung Sawan Sarb 201?		
2015	Ch.7	Rak Rae	Ramin	
2016	Ch.7	Atitha	Meung Jai	
2016	Ch.7	Look Maai Klai Ton	Chanon	
2017	Ch.7	Paragit Ruk Series	Captain Jinwat Sukplang / Tonkla	
2017	Ch.7	La Ong Dao 2017	Korakot Benjarong	
2018	Ch.7	Mae Ai Sae Eun 2018	Sunpon Song-Aksorn (Pon)	
2018	Ch.7	Nang Thip	Dr. Phatorn (present) / Pichit (past)	
2019	Ch.7	Reun Manut	Dum Pongsupab (Dum)	
2019	Ch.7	Insee Daeng (2019)	Rom Ridtikai / Insee Daeng / Sing	
2020	Ch.7	Ngao Boon	Worachon	
2021	Ch.7	Plerng Prissana	Tayakorn Weeratorn (Top)	
2022	Ch.7	Satja Nai Chum Joan	Akaradech / Rachan / Suea Dech	
2023	Ch.7	Roy Ruk Roy Barp 2023	Wisut	

=== Film ===
Year	Title	Role	Notes
2013	Coffee Please		Main Role
2014	The Return	Noorm	Main Role
2016	Tai Rom Phra Baramee: Pieng Por Tee Por Pieng	Yot	Main Role

- Nak Prok (2010) guest appearance
