= Thanakorn Sribanjong =

Thai singer and actor (born 1995)

- Born: September 17, 1995 (age 31); Bangkok, Thailand
- Other name: Hone
- Occupations: Actor, singer
- Years active: 2013–present
- Relatives: Thanat Sribanjong (Father); Kamrai Sribanjong (Mother); Namploy Sribanjong (Sister); Pennapa Sribanjong (Sister)

Thanakorn Sribanjong (Thai: ธนกร ศรีบรรจง, born September 17, 1995) is a Thai singer and actor.

== Biography ==
=== Career ===
Hone Thanakorn Sribanjong is a Thai actor and singer-songwriter who became famous by appearing on a Reality TV show "The Comedian Thailand Season #1", an onscreen program which was aired for 24 hours on Ch. 7 Drama Society and True Television within 3 months. He was one of the top 20 finalists who competed on stage during 2013. Hone wrote a song and sang it on that TV show which made him the 3rd-place winner during the finals due to popular votes from various audiences.

=== Other work ===
Hone Participated in endorsements for the first time for Quick Zabb.

== Personal life ==
Thanakorn Sribanjong a.k.a. "Hone" is the youngest child among the three (3) children of Thanat Sribanjong. Hone's interest include playing guitar, football, and singing. He is a native speaker of Thai and can also speak English. He is currently taking up a major in Film production as a freshman at Rangsit University. He has a very close relationship with his father.

== Songs ==
1. ดาวดวงใหม่: The Comedian song
2. ก่อนนอน (kønnøn) featuring with Mr. Ken; (Before go to sleep)
3. Pra-Tu-Wi-Set (ประตูวิเศษ) Magic of the Gate Feat. Nackkie & Ken
4. ขอบคุณอีกครั้ง (Thankful Again)
5. แหล่ (Rap)
6. เธออยู่ไหน (Where are you?)
7. รอ (Wait)

== Filmography ==
=== Drama ===
Year	Thai Title	Title	Producer	Role	Notes
2015	จับกัง	Jab Kang	Nopporn Production	Dūang	Supporting role
2015	สภ.รอรัก (ซิทคอม)	Sor-phor-roe-rak (sitcoms)	Poly Plus Company	RøiTamrūat-Toe: ChomkhonKha-nong-phon	Main Role
2016	แหวนปราบมาร	Wan-Prap-Marn	MongKolkanlakorn subordinary Sahamomgkol Film	Thaēn	Main Role
2016	ยมบาลเจ้าขาปี2 (ละครชุด)	Yom-Phaban-Jao-kha, EP# 2 (Series)	ตฤน เศรษฐโชค	Ma-nop	Supporting Role
2016	คู่ซ่ารสแซบ	YoKhū Sa Rot Saab/คู่ซ่ารสแซ่บ	Mummai	Phonlawat	Supporting Role

=== Films ===
Title	Producer	Channel
The Ghost Father	True Vision	True Thai Film Channel

=== Concert ===
Year	Concert	Show Dates	Venue	Number of Show	Note
2013	"The Comedian Thailand Show: Party Open-Hat"	31st May; June 1–2	Aksra Theatre King Power	4	20 finalists sang together.

== Awards and nominations ==
Year	Award	Result
2013	The 3rd Place Award of The Comedian Thailand Season 1 from Reality TV Show	WON
2014	Golden Bell Award	WON
2014	Buddhism Ambassador Award	WON
2015	Sport Man Award	WON
