= Pongpol Adireksarn =

Thai novelist and politician (born 1942)

- ปองพล อดิเรกสาร
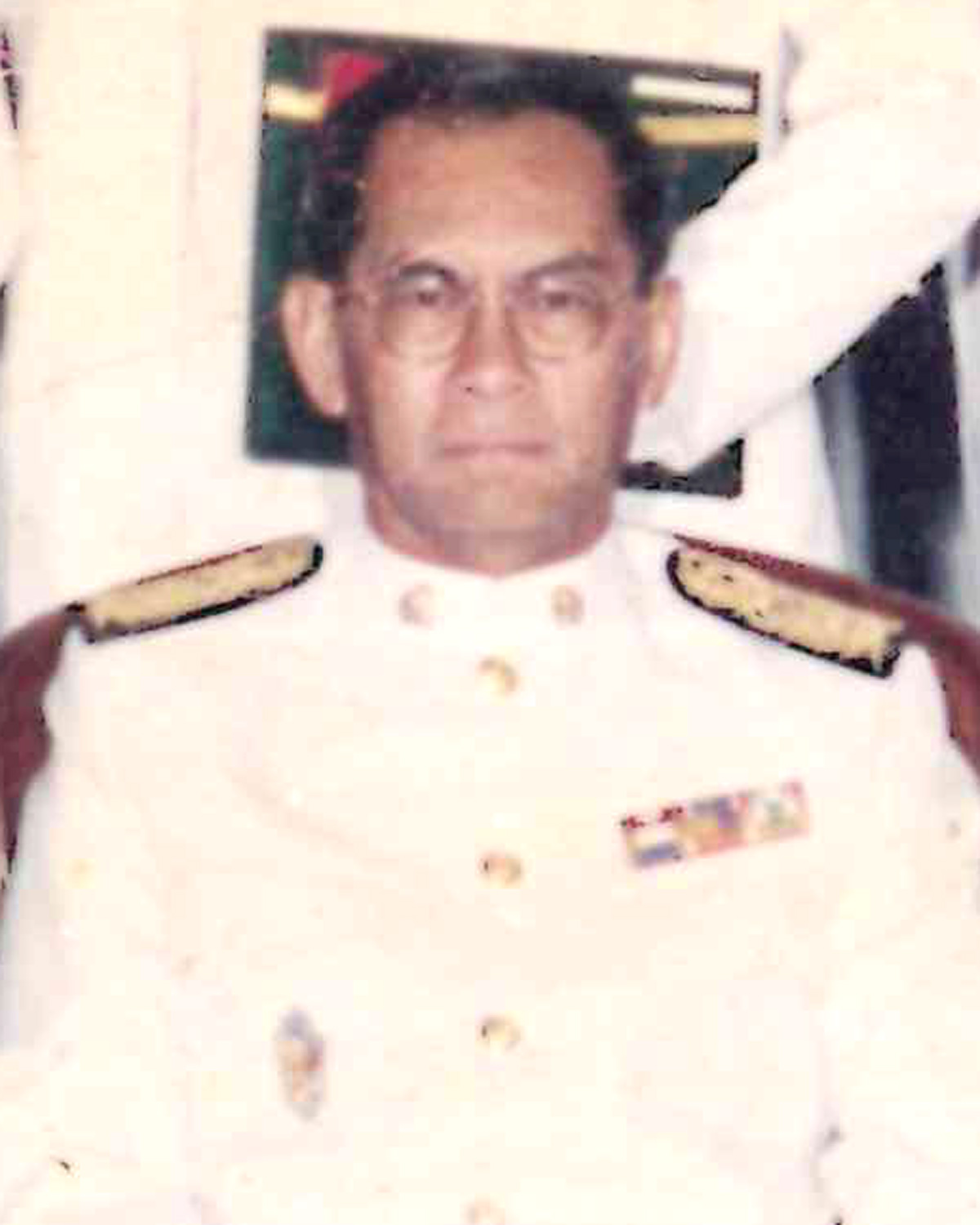
- Adireksarn in 1998

Deputy Prime Minister of Thailand
- In office 17 February 2001 – 11 March 2005
- Prime Minister: Thaksin Shinawatra

Minister to the Office of the Prime Minister
- In office 18 July 1995 – 24 November 1996
- Prime Minister: Banharn Silpa-archa

Minister of Foreign Affairs
- In office 27 March 1992 – 15 June 1992
- Prime Minister: Suchinda Kraprayoon
- Preceded by: Arsa Sarasin
- Succeeded by: Arsa Sarasin

Personal details
- Born: 23 March 1942 (age 84) Saraburi, Thailand
- Party: Thai Nation (before 2000); Thai Rak Thai (2001–2006) United Thai Nation (2022); Sarng Anakot Thai (2022–2023)
- Spouses: Jittima Sangkasap (Div.); Thida Adireksarn
- Education: Lehigh University (BA); American University (MA)
- Profession: Politician; writer; documentarist
- Other name: Paul Adirex (pen name)

Pongpol Adireksarn (Thai: ปองพล อดิเรกสาร, RTGS: Pongphon Adireksan; pen name Paul Adirex; born March 23, 1942) is a Thai novelist, documentarist and former politician.

== Early life and education ==
Pongpol's father, Pramarn Adireksarn, was a Major-General of the Royal Thai Army who became a politician and co-founder of the conservative Thai Nation Party in 1973. His mother Charoen Adireksarn (née Choonhavan) was a sister of Chatichai Choonhavan, Thailand's prime minister from 1988 to 1991. Pongpol's maternal grandfather Field Marshal Phin Choonhavan was the leader of the 1947 coup d'état and commander-in-chief of the Thai army from 1948 to 1954. One of his aunts was married to police general Phao Sriyanond who was part of a triumvirate that ruled Thailand from 1952 to 1957. Pongpol is a scion of the powerful Soi Rajakru clan. His brother Yongyol Adireksarn was also a politician.

After attending the Catholic Saint Gabriel's College in Bangkok, Pongpol attended two universities in the United States, receiving a Bachelor of Arts from Lehigh University in Bethlehem, Pennsylvania in 1964 and a Master of Arts from American University in Washington, D.C. in 1966.

== Career ==
Upon returning to Thailand, he was hired by the Department of Economic Relations, Ministry of Economic Affairs, and then served in the Thai Department of Central Intelligence.

After the 1973 popular uprising, Pongpol worked in the private sector with such positions as managing director of Royal Mosaic Exports Co., Ltd., president of Thailand Leatherwork Co., Ltd., and president of Express Transport Organization.

As a member of his father's Thai Nation Party, Pongpol was a member of parliament, representing Saraburi Province from 1983 to 1986 and March to June 1992. From April to June 1992 he also served as Minister of Foreign Affairs in Suchinda Kraprayoon's government. He served again as member of parliament from 1995 to 2000. He was Minister to the Office of the Prime Minister under his party colleague Banharn Silpa-archa from 1995 to 1996, and Minister of Agriculture and Cooperatives under Chuan Leekpai from 1997 to 2000.

Then he switched to the Thai Rak Thai Party (TRT) of Thaksin Shinawatra under whose premiership he served as Deputy Prime Minister and Minister of Education from 2001 to 2003. After the 2006 coup d'état, the Constitutional tribunal dissolved the TRT party and banned all of its leading members, including Pongpol Adireksarn, from political offices for five years.

== Royal decorations ==
- Knight Grand Cordon of the Most Exalted Order of the White Elephant
- Knight Grand Cordon of The Most Noble Order of the Crown of Thailand

== Writing career ==
After losing the 1992 election and being out of politics temporarily, he started writing novels. He chose to use a pen name as he considered his Thai name to be to difficult for a foreign readership.

- The Pirates of Tarutao, 1994, ISBN 974-89020-2-1
- Mekong, 1995, ISBN 974-89244-8-3
- Until the Karma Ends, 1996, ISBN 974-89396-2-6
- The King Kong Effect, 1998, ISBN 974-89620-3-2
- Rattanakosin, 2005, ISBN 974-9754-05-0
- Chameleon Man, 2006, ISBN 978-974-94141-7-0

== TV show host ==
He was also a photographer and documentary producer and presenter. Beyond The Blue Horizon was his nature travel documentary program aired early on Saturday mornings twice a month on Channel 3 from December 17, 2004 to December 21, 2024, a full 20 years.
