= Soi Cowboy (film) =

- Film poster
- Directed by: Thomas Clay
- Written by: Thomas Clay
- Produced by: Joseph Lang; Tom Waller
- Starring: Nicolas Bro; Art Supawatt Purdy; Pimwalee Thampanyasan; Petch Mekoh
- Cinematography: Sayombhu Mukdeeprom
- Production company: De Warrenne Pictures
- Distributed by: De Warrenne Pictures
- Release date: May 16, 2008
- Running time: 117 minutes
- Countries: Thailand; United Kingdom
- Language: Thai

Soi Cowboy (Thai: ซอยคาวบอย) is a 2008 Thai drama film directed by British director Thomas Clay. The film stars Nicolas Bro as a Danish expatriate living in Bangkok, and Pimwalee Thampanyasan as his Thai girlfriend. Soi Cowboy was first shown at the 2008 Cannes Film Festival in Un Certain Regard.

== Plot ==
Overweight expatriate Tobias shares his Bangkok apartment with his pregnant Thai girlfriend,Koi. They have so little in common that their relationship is conducted in near silence, though they tolerate each other for reasons of security and companionship. Their lives are uneventful and dull until a provincial mafia hitman arrives on the scene.

== Cast ==
- Nicolas Bro – Tobias Christiansen
- Art Supawatt Purdy – As Himself
- Pimwalee Thampanyasan – Koi
- Petch Mekoh – Cha
- Natee Srimanta – Koi's friend
- Somluck Kamsing – Uncle
