= Ban Sai Thong =

Thai romantic novel

- Author: Ko Surangkhanang
- Language: Thai
- Genre: Fiction, romance
- Publication date: 1950
- Publication place: Thailand

Ban Sai Thong (Thai: บ้านทรายทอง, lit. 'golden sand house') is a Thai romantic novel written by Ko Surangkhanang. First published as a serial in Piyamit magazine in 1950, it became one of the most popular novels of the time. Telling the story of Photchaman, a commoner girl who's sent to live with her aunt's condescending noble family, the novel has been adapted into four plays, six television soap operas, and two films.

== Plot ==
A young lower class Thai woman, Photchaman, is sent to live with her aunt's family at the grand Ban Sai Thong estate. Photchaman then must deal with her family's disdain for her and the unyielding social hierarchy of the era.
