= Saran Sirilak =

Thai actor, model and singer

Porshe Saran Sirilak
- ศรัณย์ ศิริลักษณ์
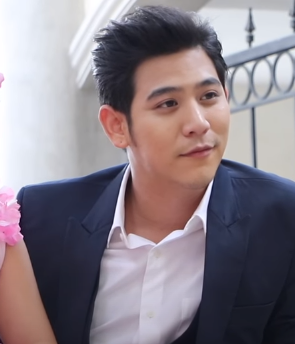
- Saran Sirilak in 2018
- Born: Saran Sirilak; 14 November 1991 (age 34); Bangkok, Thailand
- Other name: Porshe
- Occupations: Actor; singer
- Years active: 2010–present
- Height: 6 ft 1.6 in (1.87 m)

Saran Sirilak (Thai: ศรัณย์ ศิริลักษณ์; also spelt Saran Siriluksana), better known by his nickname Porshe (Thai: พอร์ช, born 14 November 1991) is a Thai actor and singer. He rose to fame in the action drama Yok Luerd Mungkorn. He is one of the popular television stars in Thailand.

== Biography ==
Saran was born on 14 November 1991 in Bangkok, later, his parents moved to Tha Mai district, Chanthaburi province. He is the eldest son of two siblings. He has one younger sister, named Jiratta Sirilak (จิรัฏฐา ศิริลักษณ์). He has a bachelor's degree from Ramkhamhaeng University and an acting degree from Rangsit University. His hobbies include fitness and basketball.

== Filmography ==
=== Television Drama ===
| Year | Thai Title | English Title | Title | Role | Network | Notes | With |
|---|---|---|---|---|---|---|---|
| 2010 | ลูกโขน | Theater Son | Look Khon | Gumpun | Channel 7 | Lead Role | Pimchanok Luevisadpaibul |
| 2011 | มนต์รักแม่น้ำมูล | Moon River Love Charm | Poot Mae Nam Khong | Sood Khaet | Channel 7 | Main Cast | Thunwa Suriyajak |
| 2011 | เสน่ห์บางกอก | Bangkok Charm | Sanae Bangkok | Prae | Channel 7 | Lead Role | Gun Jae Sal |
| 2011 | โบ๊เบ | Bo Bay | Bo Bay | Phason | Channel 7 | Main Cast | Peechaya Wattanamontree |
| 2012 | ลูกผู้ชายไม้ตะพด | The Pod Man | Look Poochai Mai ta Pode | Mai | Channel 7 | Lead Role | Chat Pariyachat |
| 2012 | ไฟมาร | Evil Fire | Fai Marn | Sruang | Channel 7 | Lead Role | Chat Pariyachat |
| 2012 | หยกเลือดมังกร | Dragon Blood | Yok Luerd Mungkorn | Yok | Channel 7 | Lead Role | Peechaya Wattanamontree |
| 2013 | สุภาพบุรุษลูกผู้ชาย | | Suparbaroot Luke Pu Chai | Rang Nakam | Channel 7 | Lead Role | Bo Thunyasupan |
| 2016 | ชื่นชีวา | | Cheun Cheewa 2016 | Saran Sarayod (Ton) | Channel 7 | Lead Role | Camilla Kittivat Kirn |
| 2016 | ลูกตาลลอยแก้ว | | | Chang Thai Phab | Channel 7 | | |
| 2018 | แม่สื่อปากร้าย ผู้ชายรสจัด | | Mae Sue Bpak Rai Poo Chai Rot Jat | Dansuk Chinsuriwet | Channel 7 | Lead Role | Usamanee Vaithayanon |
| 2018 | สายโลหิต | | Sai Lohit 2018 | Khun Khai | Channel 7 | Lead Role | Tisanart Sornsuek |
| 2019 | สวยซ่อนคม | | Suay Sorn Kom | Sui Tai (Phad Pee), Song Hai (Phad Nong) | Channel 7 | Lead Role | Karnklao Duaysienklao; Prapye Ramida; Baramita Sakornchan |
| 2019 | สุภาพบุรุษชาวดิน | | Suparburoot Chao Din | Wasin Wongdeianwad / Por Liang Chadchon Suriyawong | Channel 7 | Lead Role | Sammy Cowell |
| 2021 | วงเวียนหัวใจ | | Wong Wien Hua Jai 2018 | Nod Khanapan | Channel 7 | Lead Role | Tisanart Sornsuek |
| 2022 | ฟ้า/ทาน/ตะวัน | | Fah Tan Tawan | Weha | Amarin TV | Lead Role | Alrisa Kunkwaeng |
| 2023 | เจ้าสาวในสายลม | | | Phariyet | One 31 | Lead Role | |

=== Series Drama ===
| Year | Thai Title | English Title | Title | Role | Network | Notes | With |
|---|---|---|---|---|---|---|---|
| 2017 | ภารกิจรัก | | Paragit Ruk Series | Khanin We'-Road | Channel 7 | Lead Role | Usamanee Vaithayanon |
| 20 | Club Friday The Series Unhappy Birthday | | Club Friday The Series Unhappy Birthday | Chat | One 31 | Lead Role | |

=== Film ===
| Year | Thai Title | English Title | Title | Role | Notes | Reference |
|---|---|---|---|---|---|---|
| 2010 | เการักที่เกาหลี ซอร์รี ซารังเฮโย | Sorry Saranghaeyo | Kao Ruk Tee Korea | Won | Ajoo | |

=== Ost. ===
- Dramas : ()
  - Songs : ()
  - Songs : ()
- Dramas : ()
  - Songs : ()

=== Music Video ===
- 2009 Ruk Dai Ruk Pai Leaw (รักได้รักไปแล้ว) - Four–Mod (RS/YouTube:welovekamikaze)
- 2009 Siang Lom Hai Chai (เสียงลมหายใจ) - Pramote Wilepana (Sony Music Entertainment (Thailand)/YouTube:ปราโมทย์ วิเลปะนะ Official Channel) with Tisanart Sornsuek
- 2010 (เพื่อนหรือแฟน ver.2) - Nutty (RS/YouTube:rsfriends) with Monchanok Saengchaipiangpen
- 2010 (หากเรายังรักกัน) -
- 2012 (ความรักดีๆ อยู่ที่ไหน) - Peet Peera (MONO MUSIC/YouTube:E29 MUSIC IDENTITIES) with Pattarasaya Yongrattanamongkol

=== MC ===
- 2012 : (เส้นทางบันเทิง) On Air Ch.7
- 20 : () On Air YouTube:PORSHECLUB Channel
