= Chalong Pakdeevijit =

Thai film director

- ฉลอง ภักดีวิจิตร
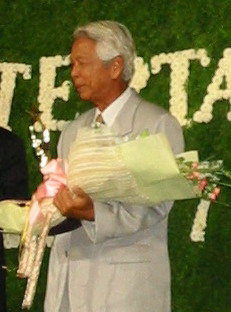
- Pakdeevijit in 2008
- Born: Boonchalong Pakdeevijit; March 18, 1931; Si Phraya, Bang Rak, Bangkok, Siam
- Died: September 13, 2024 (aged 93); Ramathibodi Hospital Bangkok, Thailand
- Other names: Ar Long ("Uncle Long"); Philip Chalong; P. Chalong
- Education: Amnuay Silpa School
- Occupations: Director; producer; cinematographer
- Years active: 1950–2024
- Known for: The Thong Anthology (10 films to date)
- Notable work: Thong (Gold) (Thai: ทอง)(S.T.A.B., 1973); Thong 2 (Gold Raiders, 1982); Raya (Thai: ระย้า), 1998; Chumphae (Thai: ชุมแพ), 2007; Sao Har (Thai: เสาร์ ๕), 2011; Thong 10 (Thai: ทอง 10), 2016; Tulip Thong (Thai: ทิวลิปทอง), 2017
- Spouses: Sumon Pakdeevijit (m. 1966; died 2014) Pimsupak Insee (m. 2014)
- Children: Gun Pakdeevijit (son); Cherd Pakdeevijit (son); Boonjira Pakdeevijit (daughter)
- Parents: Puth Pakdeevijit (father); Lingee Pakdeevijit (mother)

Chalong Pakdeevijit (Thai: ฉลอง ภักดีวิจิตร; RTGS: Chalong Phakdiwichit; born Boonchalong Pakdeevijit (Thai: บุญฉลอง ภักดีวิจิตร) (March 18, 1931 – September 13, 2024) was a Thai film and television director, producer, cinematographer, and voice actor. In February 2023, he was certified by Guinness World Records as the Oldest TV Director for his work on the mini-series The Maekhong Connection for Channel 7 HD. Dubbed 'King of Action,' Chalong is best known for having created, directed, and produced action films and TV shows. He was known as 'Ar Long', and internationally as Philip Chalong or P. Chalong.

== Early life ==
Pakdeevijit was born into a filmmaking family. His father was a director and producer, and his brothers are all in the movie industry. He started as a cinematographer in 1950 and directed his first film in 1968.

== Career ==
In 1973, he released the film Thong (transl. Gold) to Thailand and foreign countries. The film introduces foreign actors to lead in Thai cinema, such as Greg Morris and Thẩm Thúy Hằng. Foreign actors, such as Jan-Michael Vincent, Christopher Mitchum and Olivia Hussey, sometimes take the lead roles.

His last film was Sud Keed: Mungkorn Chao Phraya 2 (transl. Chaophya Dragon 2) in 1996. In 1998, he turned to producing and directing a TV series for Channel 7, starting with Raya, with lead roles by Pete Thongchua and Chatmongkol Bumpen.

In 2013, he was appointed National Artist of Performing Arts (film & television – director & executive producer) by the Ministry of Culture.

Chalong has created, produced, and directed more than 60 movies and T.V, shows. His films include Fhon Tai (1970), Fhon Nuea (1970), Thong (S.T.A.B.; 1973), Thong 2 (Gold Raiders; 1982), Thong 3 (The Lost Idol; 1988) and Thong 4 (In Gold We Trust; 1990).

Chalong transitioned to television and started to produce action miniseries exclusively for Channel 7, with the top-rated television debut Raya (Thai: ระย้า'; 1998). According to AC Neilsen, published on WTFintheworld.com, he is the only director in Thailand with two entries in the top 10 of the Thailand Highest Rating Television Miniseries of All Time.

These two Channel 7 miniseries include Chumphae (Thai: ชุมแพ; 2007) and Sao Har (Thai: เสาร์ ๕; 2011). He earned the nickname "Action Film Tycoon", by his style of films, called in Thailand Raboet Phukhao Phao Kratom (ระเบิดภูเขา เผากระท่อม; lit. 'Bombing Mountain, Burning Cabin').

== Personal life and death ==
Chalong Pakdeevijit married Sumon Pakdeevijit in 1966, and the two remained married until her death from cancer in 2014.

On December 28, 2014, he married for the second time to a 38-year-old bride.

Pakdeevijit died from a pulmonary edema at the Ramathibodi Hospital in Bangkok, on September 13, 2024. He was 93.
