= Joey Chernyim =

Ghanaian comedian, actor, and footballer

- Born: Musa Amidou Johnson; December 28, 1974 (age 51); Accra, Ghana
- Other name: Joey Ghana
- Citizenship: Thailand
- Occupations: Footballer (former), Comedian, Actor
- Years active: 2003–present
- Known for: Duk Dum Dui, Phao Taek, The Medallion
- Height: 6 ft 2 in (188 cm)

Joey Chernyim or Joey Ghana (Thai: โจอี้ เชิญยิ้ม, โจอี้ กาน่า; born: December 28, 1974), is a Ghanaian comedian based in Thailand. He is known as a supporting actor, and former footballer who played as a goalkeeper.

== Biography & career ==
He was born as Musa Amidou Johnson in Accra, Ghana. Johnson was a Ghana national under-17 football team player, and played for the Selangor FA of Malaysia Super League, Malaysia. Then he moved to Singapore, but with the high cost of living, he traveled to Thailand following his friend's persuasion in 1999.

In Thailand, the selection of players with the TTM Thailand Tobacco Monopoly F.C., while waiting to be screened. His friend had invited him to open a clothing store, but suffered a loss. Later he was found and became known to Thep Po-ngam, a famous comedian, who was planning to find a comedian who was a foreigner already. His first film was Duk dum dui in 2003.

His well-known joke is the scene that answers the question of Theng Therdtherng in the Phao Taek in 2010, when Theng asked, "Mosquitoes in Ghana that flies or walks ?", which he thought was a very bugging question.

Another iconic and memorable scene is from The Holy Man III in the same year, where he plays the disciple of a shaman, portrayed by Noi Chernyim. In the scene, they trade jokes back and forth naturally and effortlessly. Noi stands out with his commands that sound like short chants, recited to the beat of a dance track. This scene not only helped Noi rise to full fame and become his signature style, but it also went viral, inspiring lots of comedic references afterward.

In addition, Johnson also starred with the world-famous Hong Kong-born Chinese martial artist Jackie Chan in The Medallion in 2003.

== Personal life ==
He is Muslim and was previously married to a Thai woman, but they have since divorced.

== Filmography ==
- Sodemacom Killer (sequel of Killer Tattoo; 2020)
- Cry No Fear (2018)
- I Fine..Thank You..Love You (cameo; 2014)
- Sweet & Sour Revenge (2012)
- Love Summer (2011; with Pimchanok Luevisadpaibul, Thanwa Suriyajak)
- Vampire Strawberry (2011)
- Bangkok Revenge (2011)
- Luer Lae (2011)
- Phao Taek (2010)
- Luang phii theng III (The Holy Man III; 2010)
- The Vanquisher (2009; with Sarunyu Wongkrachang)
- Teng Nong Khon Maha-Hia (2007)
- Lahu Funnyman (short; 2006)
- Duk dum dui (2003)
- The Medallion (2003)
