= Clueless (2010 film) =

- Thai: โป๊ะแตก
- Directed by: Petchtai Wongkamlao
- Written by: Pipat Jomkoh; Petchtai Wongkamlao
- Produced by: Somsak Techaratanaprasert; Panya Nirunkul; Prachya Pinkaew; Sukanya Vongsthapat; Petchtai Wongkamlao
- Starring: Petchtai Wongkamlao; Suthep Po-ngam; Musa Amidou Johnson; Pongsak Pongsuwan; Choosak Eamsuk
- Cinematography: Rattapon Santanakorn
- Edited by: Prapos Surasakulwat; Choopol Sriprai
- Music by: Kanisorn Phuangjeen
- Production companies: Sahamongkol Film International; Workpoint Entertainment; Baa-Ram-Ewe; Bang Fai Film
- Distributed by: Sahamongkol Film International
- Release date: June 3, 2010
- Running time: 88 minutes
- Country: Thailand
- Language: Thai

Clueless (Thai: โป๊ะแตก or Poh Tak also spelt Phao Taek) is a 2010 Thai comedy film directed and written by Petchtai Wongkamlao (Mum Jokmok).

== Plot ==
The film stars Petchtai Wongkamlao, Suthep Po-ngam (Thep Po-ngam) and several superstar comedians, with everyone portraying as themselves. When famous director Wongkamlao wants to make a new film titled "Poh Tak...Yaek Tang Narok", these comedians were gathered to perform.

Clueless parodies behind the scenes of filmmaking and the Thai film industry including many Thai comedy films.

== Cast ==
- Petchtai Wongkamlao (Mum Jokmok) as himself
- Suthep Po-ngam (Thep Po-ngam) as himself
- Anek Inthajun (Anna Chuanchuen) as himself
- Musa Amidou Johnson (Joey Chernyim) as himself
- Sornsutha Klunmalee (Tuarae Chernyim) as himself
- Akom Preedakul (Kom Chuanchuen) as himself
- Apaporn Nakornsawan as herself
- Sudarat Butrprom (Tukky Chingroi) as herself
- Chookiat Eamsuk (Nui Chernyim) as himself
- Siriporn Yooyord as herself
- Pongsak Pongsuwan (Theng Therdtherng) as himself
- Choosak Eamsuk (Nong Cha-cha-cha) as himself
- Chitisan Chaisena (Chusri Chernyim) as himself
- Supaphorn Chaiyunboon (Cherry Samkhok) as herself
- Pawita Preecha as Film premiere presenter
- Thanya Phowichit (Ped Chernyim) as himself (guest)
- Bamrue Phonginsee (Note Chernyim) as himself (guest)
- Jumphot Srichamorn (Noi Chernyim) as himself (guest)
- Endoo Wongkamlao as herself (cameo)
- Leena Jungjunja as Journalist (cameo)
- Phuping Pangsa-at (Ping Lumpraploeng) as himself (cameo)

== Trivia ==
- Its title Poh Tak (actually means "broken pontoon") in fact, it is a kind of Thai soup similar to Tom Yum. Just Poh Tak is a seafood Tom Yum does not add nam phrik phao (chili paste), so the soup is clear. Sometimes it is called "Tom Yum Nam Sai" (ต้มยำน้ำใส, "clear soup Tom Yam"). In addition, the term Poh Tak is a Thai slang that means "caught lying".
