= Phranakorn Film =

Film studio in Thailand

Phranakorn Film Co. Ltd.
- Industry: Motion pictures
- Founded: 2001; 25 years ago
- Headquarters: Bangkok, Thailand
- Key people: Manot Thanarungroj; Thanapol Thanarungroj; Wichai Thanarungroj; Suwannee Thanarungroj
- Products: Films
- Subsidiaries: Thana Cineplex
- Website: Official site

Phranakorn Film Co. Ltd. (Thai: บริษัท พระนครฟิลม์ จำกัด) is a movie studio in Thailand. It was established in 2001 by a family owned group that runs the Thana Cineplex movie-theater chain. The private company is operated by the founder and chief executive officer Manot Thanarungroj.

== Company profile ==
=== Introduction ===
Phranakorn Film is one of the leading companies in Thai film business. For many years, the company has owned local theatres in multiple provinces in Thailand. Since 2001, the company is growing by producing more 20 films to both local and international audiences. The company is now also a home-video distributor, in order to serve the home video market.

=== Production House ===
Phranakorn Film is one of the leading production companies in Thailand, producing more than five movies each year. Established in 2001, Phranakorn Film began with their first production released in 2002 for domestic audiences titled, Headless Hero, which had box-office earnings of 72 million baht, an amount that broke the record for overall titles released in theatres during that year. In 2005, The Holy Man was the only title of the year making a record-breaking total of more than 141 million baht, while in 2008, Holy Man 2 was the No. 1 movie at the Thai box office.

=== Exhibitor/seller ===
Since 2005, Phranakorn Film began to import more movies to the international market, to expand the availability of genres for distributor selection. There are now more to 20 movies released to the public, both domestically and worldwide.

=== Home video Distributor ===
In the hopes of increasing supplies for the domestic home video market in Thailand, Phranakorn Film has established an affiliate of the company METRO PRO DISC as the home video distributor, which has become one of the biggest distributors in the Thai home video business. Beside its own products, the company also distributes other studio movies. In the future, the company plans to import international movies to gain a bigger share of market.

== Filmography ==
- Headless Hero (2002) Director : Komsan Treepong
- The Safari (2003) Director : Thep Pho-ngam
- Man of Ma Year (2003) Director : Note Chernyim
- The Sisters (2004) Director : Tiwa Moeithaisong
- Headless Hero 2 (2004) Director : Komsan Treepong
- Werewolf in Bangkok (2005) Director : Virote Thongchiew
- The Holy Man (2005) Director : Note Chernyim
- The Rascals (2005) Director : Virote Thongchiew
- In the name of The Tiger (2005) Director : Tharathon Siripanwarapon
- Navy Boys (2006) Director : Vorapote Potinetara
- The Magnificent Five (2006) Director : Bhandit Rittakol
- Just Kids (2006) Director : Patipan Kanasansombbat, Voravit Phonginsee, Sophon Nimanong, Voravuth Chuanyoo
- The Golden Riders (2006) Director : Udom Udomroj
- Train of the Dead (2006) Director : Sukhum Matavanit
- The One (2006) Director : Marut Sarowat
- Ghost Mother (2006) Director : Tharathon Siripanwarapon
- Black Family (2006) Director : Note Chernyim
- Three Cripples (2007) Director : Poj Arnon
- In Country Malody (2007) Director : Note Chernyim
- The Haunted Drum (2007) Director : Natapera Chomsri, Sarunya Noithai
- Busaba Bold & Beautiful (2008) Director : Pisoot Praesangeiam
- Ghost & Master Boh (2008) Director : Vorapote Potinetara
- April Road Trip (2008) Director : Vorawit Phonginsee
- Hanuman: The White Monkey Warrior (2008) Director : Sakchai Sriboonark
- Holy Man 2 (2008) Director : Note Chernyim
- Headless Family (2008) Director : Kote Aramboy
- Deep in the Jungle (2008) Director : Teerawat Rujeenatham
- Fireball (2009) Director : Thanakorn Pongsuwan
- Meat Grinder (2009) Director : Tiwa Moeithaisong
- Sassy Players (2009) Director : Poj Arnon
- In Country Melody 2 (2009) Director : Voravit Ponginsee
- Oh My Ghost (2009) Director : Poj Arnon
- The Storm Warriors (2009) Director : Pang brothers
- Still (2010) Director : Poj Arnon, Chatchai Ketnat, Thanwarin Sukhaphisit, Manussa Vorasingha
- Jolly Rangers (2010) Director : Note Chernyim
- Bang Rajan 2 (2010) Director : Tanit Jitnukul
- The Intruder (2010) Director : Tanadol Nualsuth, Ping Thammanoon
- Sorry Saranghaeyo (2010) Director : Poj Arnon
- Holy Man 3 (2010) Director : Note Chernyim
- Killer Trilogy (2010-2011) Director : Yuthlert Sippapak
- Hor Taew Taek Haek Krajerng (2011) Director : Poj Arnon
