= Somchai Kemglad =

Thai actor and singer

Somchai Khemglad
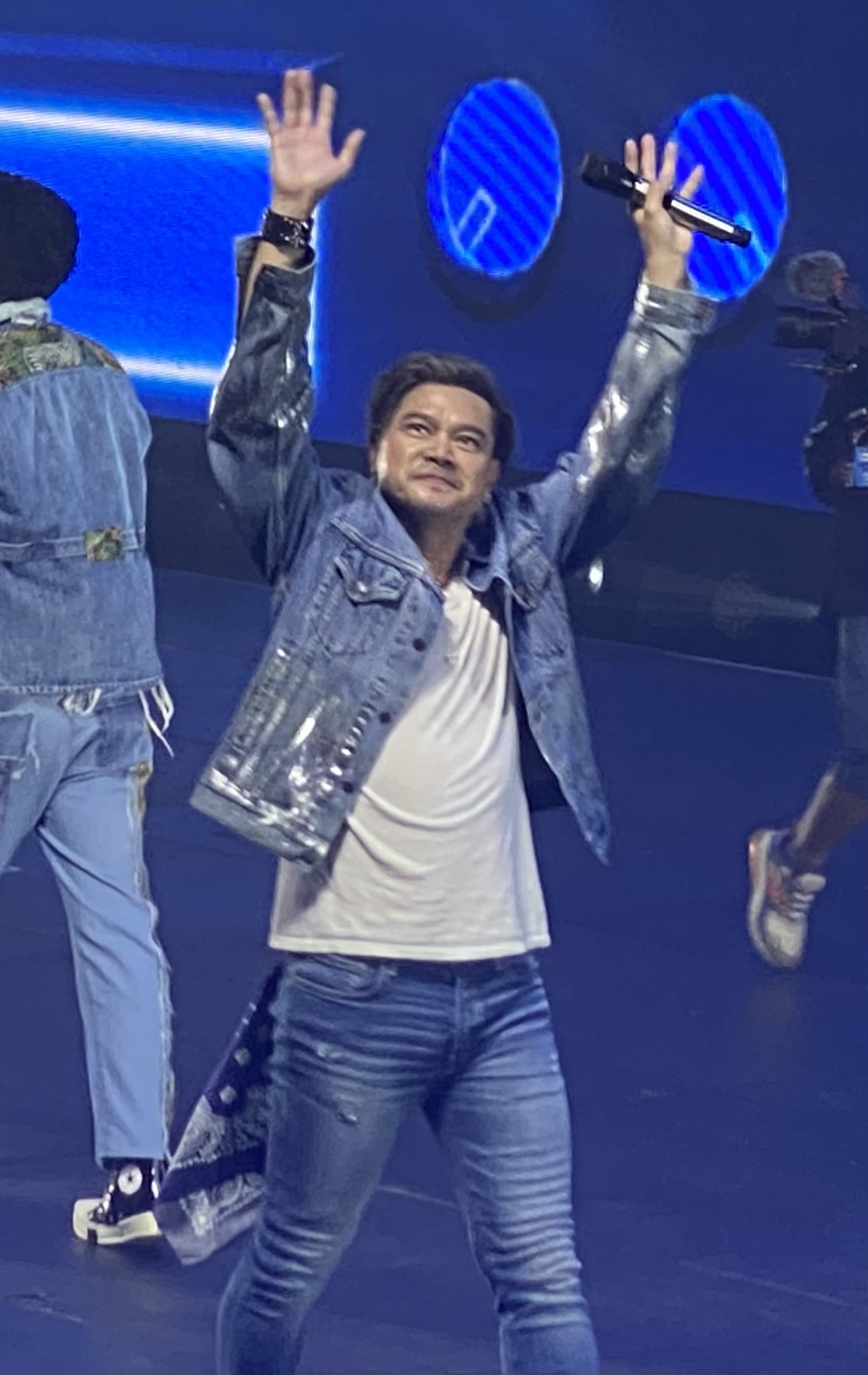
- Somchai Khemglad in GRAMMY X RS 90's Versary Concert in 2023
- Born: 26 January 1974 (age 52); Khlong Toei, Bangkok, Thailand
- Other names: Tao; Tao Somchai
- Education: Debsirin School; Suansunandha Rajabhat University
- Occupations: Actor; singer
- Years active: 1990–present
- Agent: RS (1992–2000s)
- Spouses: Myria Benedetti (m. 2003; div. 2006); Athamard "Yui" Khemglad (Asavavimol) (m. 2009)
- Children: 2

Somchai Khemglad (Thai: สมชาย เข็มกลัด), born 26 January 1974 in Bangkok, also familiarly known as Tao (เต๋า) or Tao Somchai, is a Thai actor and singer.

== Biography & career ==
Tao was born into a poor Thai Mon family in Bangkok, he was raised by his grandmother. While being a student at Debsirin School he was a representative footballer for the school and was also a player for the Thai national team at youth level.

He entered the entertainment industry in the early 1990s from recruiting by famous scout Poj Arnon, considered a contemporary teen star with many other celebrities such as Patiparn "Mos" Pataweekarn, Pramote Seangsorn, Sornram "Num" Teppitak, Lift-Oil.

His first performance was as a supporting role in the Saturday evening fantasy-drama series Nang Fah Si Rung on Channel 7 in 1990 by Grammy Entertainment in credited "Tao Somchai".

In 1992, he signed with the country's leading entertainment company that rivaled the Grammy Entertainment, RS Promotion, and released several music albums including acting in many dramas and movies as well.

His most famous performance in the '90s was as the protagonist in the 1995 romantic-drama film Romantic Blue, with contemporaries Suttida "Nook" Kasemsan Na Ayutthaya (who became his imagined couple) and Pramote Saengsorn.

Tao's other works in the post-20th century are starring in Yuthlert Sippapak's action-comedy series, Killer Tattoo in 2001 and Pattaya Maniac in 2004, among others.

== Personal life ==
He married a fellow entertainer Myria "Nat" Benedetti in 2003 and divorced in 2006.

Tao remarried to his current wife in 2009. The couple has two children.

== Selected filmography ==
=== Films ===
- Hero Haew (1992)
- Romantic Blue (1995)
- Long June (1996)
- Friendship Breakdown (1999)
- Killer Tattoo (2001)
- Pattaya Maniac (2004)
- Opapatika (2007)
- Teng Nong Kon Maha Hia (2007)
- In the Shadow of the Naga (2008)
- Teng Nong Jee Worn Bin (2011)
- The Unborn Child (2011)
- The Gangster (2012)
- Spicy Beauty Queen of Bangkok 2 (2012)
- Young Bao The Movie (2013)
- Inspector Mad Dog (2013)
- The Unreasonable Man (2014)
- Fearless Love (2022)
- Kitty The Killer (2023)

=== Television series ===
- Nang Fah Si Rung (1990)
- Narm Sai Jai Jing (1994)
- Khao Plueak (1994)
- Ko Sawat Hat Sawan (1996)
- Pee Nueng Puen Gun Lae Won As Sa Jan Khong Phoom (1996)
- Bangrajun (2015)
- Ban Lang Mek (2015)
- The Legendary Outlaw (2016)
- The Legendary Outlaw 2 (2018)
- Romantic Blue: The Series (2020)
- Bussaba Lui Fai (2023)
- Khemjira (2025)

== Selected discography ==
=== Studio albums ===
- Tao Hua Joke (1993)
- Somchai Jod Plai Tao (1995)
- Somchai 100 Raeng Ma (1998)

=== Special albums ===
- Somchai O.T. (1995)

== Awards ==
- Suphannahong National Film Awards (1995) (Best Actor)
- Golden Doll Awards 2001 (Best Actor)
