= Sudarat Butrprom =

Thai actress and comedian (born 1979)

- สุดารัตน์ บุตรพรม
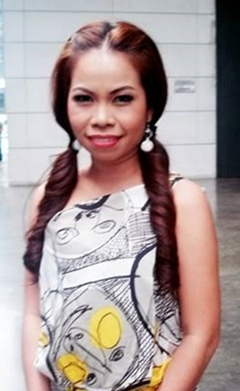
- Sudarat in 2009
- Born: March 15, 1979 (age 47); Wang Sam Mo District, Udon Thani Province, Thailand
- Other names: Tukky; Sudarat Phonamkham
- Education: Maha Sarakham University
- Occupations: Comedienne; actress
- Years active: 2005–present
- Spouse: Kamthon Phonamkham (Thai: กำธร โพธิ์น้ำคำ)

Sudarat Butrprom (Thai: สุดารัตน์ บุตรพรม) or stage name Tukky (Thai: ตุ๊กกี้; born March 15, 1979) is a Thai actress and comedian, known as the "queen of comedy" for her TV comedy appearances.

== Biography ==
She was born on March 15, 1979, in Udon Thani, Isan (northeastern region) of Thailand. She started working at Workpoint Entertainment as a costume attendant. She has been a comedian since 2005 as a sidekick with Sam Cha Gang (Thai : แก็งสามช่า) with Mum Jokmok, Pongsak Pongsuwan (Teng) and Chusak Iamsuk (Nong). Her involvement with Sam Cha Gang ceased in 2017 while working in the show called Ching Roi Ching Lan. She has acted many films and televisions in her acting career.

Sudarat is best known for her breakthrough role as "Teacher Inn" in the Thai romantic comedy film "First Love", starring with Mario Maurer and Pimchanok Luevisadpaibul. The film releases on August 12, 2010, and become 2011 Asian sleeper hit film. Moreover, she is known as "Teacher Phensri" in Talok Hok Chak.

She has 13 year over relationship with Kamthon Phonamkham (Thai: กำธร โพธิ์น้ำคำ), and married on 25 December 2016.

== Filmography ==
=== Movies ===
- Yam Yasothon (แหยม ยโสธร) (2005)
- Yam Yasothon 2 (แหยม ยโสธร 2) (2007)
- Hoa Taew Taek Haek Kra Jueng (หอแต๋วแตกแหกกระเจิง) (2009)
- Tukky, Jao Ying Khaai Khob (ตุ๊กกี้ เจ้าหญิงขายกบ) (2010)
- First Love (สิ่งเล็กเล็ก ที่เรียกว่า...รัก) (2010)
- Teng Nong Jiworn Bin (เท่ง โหน่ง จีวรบิน) (2011)
- Panya&Renu 2 (ปัญญา เรณู 2) (2012)
- Luang Phee Jazz 4G (หลวงพี่แจ๊ส 4G) (2016)
- Isan Zombie (อีสานซอมบี้) (2023)
- Rent Boy (2023 film)

=== Television dramas ===
- 2023 Khru Phensri and Ghoul Lady (ครูเพ็ญศรีกับเลดี้ปอบ) (Workpoint Entertainment-B MOVIE/Workpoint TV) as Kroo Phensri (Phen) (ครูเพ็ญศรี (เพ็ญ)) with Kapol Thongplub
- 2023 (กามเทพก้นครัว) (Workpoint Entertainment-TV Thunder/Workpoint TV) as Dr.Araya (พญ.อารยา) with Kohtee Aramboy

=== Television programs ===
- Gang of Gags (ตลก 6 ฉาก) (2005–2022)
- Ching Roi Ching Lan (ชิงร้อยชิงล้าน) (2005-2017)
- Mai Thong Kham:Mor Lam Fang Phet (ไมค์ทองคำ หมอลำฝังเพชร) (2016–present)

=== Judge ===
- The Mask Line Thai (2018)

== Awards ==
- 2010 - Luk Ka Tan Yoo (ลูกกตัญญู) from Given for Social Organization by praton-age of queen
- 2012 - Old Students great (ศิษย์เก่าดีเด่น) from Maha Sarakham University
- 2016 - Pra Kinnari (พระกินรี)
