= Romantic Blue: The Series =

2020 Thai television series

- Thai: โลกทั้งใบให้นายคนเดียว
- Genre: Crime thriller; Romance; Drama
- Developed by: RS Television
- Directed by: Ong-Art Singlumpong
- Starring: Thitiwat Ritprasert; Prachaya Ruangroj; Tipnaree Weerawatnodom
- Country of origin: Thailand
- Original language: Thai
- No. of episodes: 13

Production
- Production company: RS Television

Original release
- Network: Channel 8; iQIYI
- Release: 12 December 2020 – 17 January 2021

Related
- Romantic Blue

Romantic Blue: The Series (Thai: โลกทั้งใบให้นายคนเดียว; Lok Thang Bai Hai Nai Khon Diao; literally: "the whole world for you only") is a 2020 Thai television series remake of the 1995 film with the same title starring Thitiwat Ritprasert (Ohm), Prachaya Ruangroj (Singto) and Tipnaree Weerawatnodom (Namtan).

Directed by Ong-Art Singlumpong, the series premiered on Channel 8 and iQIYI on 12 December 2020, airing on Saturdays and Sundays at 21:40 ICT.

== Cast and characters ==
Below are the cast of the series:

=== Main ===
- Thitiwat Ritprasert (Ohm) as Thiti Seang-Ngeing (Mai)
- Prachaya Ruangroj (Singto) as Thada Seang-Ngeing (Mhen)
- Tipnaree Weerawatnodom (Namtan) as Sutatinee Supaworakran (Pon)

=== Supporting ===
- Somchai Khemglad (Tao) as To
- Pramote Seangsorn as Thongchai (Bo) (To Friend)
- Suttida Kasemsan Na Ayutthaya (Nook) as Anong (Mai and Mhen Mother)
- Tanongsak Supakan (Nong) as Thiwakorn Seang-Ngeing (Thio) (Mai and Mhen Father)
- Prin Wikran (Por) as Pornchai Supaworakran (Cheksong) (Pom Father)
- Kitsadee Phuangprayong (Bank) as Khem (Henchman To)
- Ratri Chamthewi (June) as Muai (Henchman To)
- Praeploy Lertthitivirakarn (Play) as Kannika Kawpecha (New) (Pom Friend)

=== Cameo appearance ===
- Pimpawan Chokbawornmethawat () as Nursing (Ep.1,6)
- Natchayaporn Chanyoosuk () as Nursing (Ep.1,2,4,8)
- Opas Suthipien () as Doctor (Ep.2,4,5,8)
- Pattanaset Chiratharn () as Somyot Laomala (customers who come to repair the saloon) (Ep.7,10)
- Akaraphon Thongthadol (Af) as News presenter Channel 8 (Ep.10)
- Romklao Amatayakun (Looked) as News presenter Channel 8 (Ep.10)
- Chanitnan Punnanithi (May) as News presenter Channel 8 (Ep.10)
- Charee Aimmark () as Sukhum pongpaiboon (Executive of luxury car company PEGASUS) (Ep.10)
- Kriengkrai Unkaew () as Royal Thai Police (Ep.10)
- Kasem Sai-Mun () as Royal Thai Police (Ep.10)
