= Buppah Rahtree Phase 2: Rahtree Returns =

- Thai movie poster
- Directed by: Yuthlert Sippapak
- Written by: Yuthlert Sippapak
- Produced by: Amorn Chanapai; Yuthlert Sippapak
- Starring: Laila Boonyasak; Krit Sripoomseth
- Cinematography: Somkid Phukphong
- Edited by: Tawat Siripong
- Music by: Gancore Club
- Distributed by: Sahamongkol Film International
- Release date: 24 March 2005
- Running time: 106 minutes
- Country: Thailand
- Language: Thai

Buppah Rahtree Phase 2: Rahtree Returns (Thai: บุปผาราตรี เฟส 2) is a 2005 Thai comedy-horror film written and directed by Yuthlert Sippapak. It is a sequel to the 2003 film, Buppah Rahtree.

== Plot ==
The vengeful female ghost, Buppah, continues to inhabit apartment 609. She shares the room with her ghost boyfriend, Ake, who has been left legless by Buppah after his transgressions in the first film. A blind woman named Thip rents a neighboring apartment. She is due for an eye operation, but the doctor treating her tries to rape her. He is stopped by Rahtree who takes pity upon Thip. Meanwhile, a comic foursome of bank robbers have entered Rahtree's apartment and are using it as a hideout after robbing a bank but find themselves in trouble with Ake and Buppah.

Its sequels are Rahtree Reborn and Rahtree Revenge. Buppah reborn to a girl and was raped and killed. Buppah's tutorial student Rang rents a neighboring apartment. He falls in love with the ghost. Meanwhile, a man J'Sam turns the third floor into an illegal casino. They are injured or killed by the ghost. The ghost is exorcised and reborn to another girl.

== Cast ==
- Laila Boonyasak as Buppah Rahtree
- Krit Sripoomseth as Ake
- Pitchanart Sakakorn as Thip
- Phan Rojanarangsri as Doo
- Supakorn Srisawat as Dee
- Somjai Sukjai as Der
- Banphot Weerarat as Den
- Somlek Sakdikul as Master Tong

== Festivals and awards ==
- The film was screened in competition at the 2005 Puchon International Fantastic Film Festival with the best actor prize being shared among the four comedian actors: Phan Rojanarangsri, Supakorn Srisawat, Somjai Sukjai and Banphot Weerarat.
