= Buppah Rahtree =

- Thai movie poster
- Directed by: Yuthlert Sippapak
- Written by: Yuthlert Sippapak
- Produced by: Amorn Chanapai; Yuthlert Sippapak
- Starring: Laila Boonyasak; Krit Sripoomseth
- Cinematography: Prapapope Duangpikool
- Edited by: Tawat Siripong
- Music by: Gancore Club
- Distributed by: Nakomthai Picture Co. Ltd.
- Release date: November 14, 2003 (Thailand)
- Running time: 109 minutes
- Country: Thailand
- Language: Thai

Buppah Rahtree (Thai: บุปผาราตรี also Rahtree: Flower of the Night and Buppah Rahtree: Scent of the Night Flower) is a 2003 Thai comedy-horror film written and directed by Yuthlert Sippapak. With its comic references to The Exorcist and Audition, Buppah Rahtree gained a cult following through screenings at the 2004 Toronto International Film Festival and the Fantasia Festival. Its sequels are Buppah Rahtree Phase 2: Rahtree Returns (2005), Rahtree Reborn (Buppha Rahtree 3.1) (2009) and Rahtree Revenge (Buppha Rahtree 3.2) (2009).

== Plot ==
Buppah Rahtree is a loner female student at a Bangkok university who becomes the object of a wager by a group of male students to see if she can be bedded. Ake, the son of a wealthy family, takes the bet and courts young Buppah. She resists him at first, but one day sees him feeding pigeons in a park and talks to him. After she expresses her desire to fly away, they go on a ride in Ake's convertible. They continue to have a relationship, which culminates in a three-day weekend at Bang Saen, during which Ake has sex with her; he stays in bed with her the whole time. Ake shows videotapes of their sex to his friends, and for his efforts wins a bottle of Johnnie Walker, which he reflects to himself seems like a trivial prize for messing up another person's life. Ake breaks off all contact with Buppah.

After her stepfather gives her a car ride, he takes her to a short-time hotel and sexually assaults her. She stabs him with a fountain pen he gave her as a present and runs home to her apartment. Depressed, she contemplates suicide but is interrupted by a phone call from Ake, who wants to meet her. Ake tells her about the wager and apologizes. Though he plans to leave Thailand to study in England, he hopes to maintain their friendship. Buppah informs Ake she is two months' pregnant. Ake's mother tells him to convince Buppah to have an abortion. After the operation, he drives her back to her apartment, and it is obvious she is in pain. Ake leaves to get rice congee but does not return.

After unsuccessfully attempting to collect rent, Buppah's landlady breaks into the apartment, where she discovers Buppah's corpse; Buppah bled to death due to complications from the abortion. When the authorities arrive, Buppah revives, and her vengeful spirit refuses to be dislodged. Mrs. See calls upon Maew, a false shaman who hustles locals, to exorcise the spirit. When he fails, Maew convinces his teacher, Master Tong, to try. For his effort, Master Tong is left with a knife in his back. A pair of Roman Catholic priests perform an exorcism, only to end up cursed at and vomited upon by the ghost. As Buppah haunts the building, residents leave in droves, ruining Mrs. See's finances.

In England, Ake grows homesick and has turned to drug use. He returns to Thailand and offers to bring Buppah rice congee. Ake catches the eye of Muay, a young woman at the congee stand. Muay seduces Ake and has him take her to an old cinema, where they have sex. When Ake returns to Buppah's apartment, he has forgotten the congee. Buppah knows that Ake has cheated on her, and for his transgression, she amputates his legs. Muay comes to the apartment to find Ake. Buppah takes possession of Muay's body and compels Muay to cut her own legs off.

Mrs. See recruits a genuine shaman from Cambodia. The shaman and his men come to the apartment just as Muay is being possessed. They put a spirit cloth over Ake and on Buppah's corpse. Through a prayer, the shaman puts Buppah's spirit back into the corpse. They plan to take Buppah to a temple to be cremated, but on the way, the spirit cloth blows off the body, which is in the back of a pickup truck. Buppah takes control of the vehicle and causes it to crash into another truck.

Muay, saddened by the turn of events, makes contact with Ake's father, who is angered and puzzled by the call. As it turns out, Ake has been dead for more than a month. Muay had sexual relations with Ake's ghost.

Buppah returns to her apartment, where she will likely stay for eternity. Ake's ghost, now legless, sits outside in the hallway and apologizes to Buppah for the rest of his ghost eternity.

== Cast ==
- Laila Boonyasak as Buppah Rahtree
- Krit Sripoomseth as Ake
- Chompunoot Piyapane as Muay
- Sirisin Siripornsmathikul as Mrs. See
- Ampon Rattanawong as Maew
- Somlek Sakdikul as Master Tong

== Soundtrack ==
Original Motion Picture Soundtrack: Buppah Rahtree

Soundtrack album by various artists
- Released: 2003
- Genres: Hip hop, pop
- Length: 41:45
- Label: GMM Grammy

A soundtrack album, Original Motion Picture Soundtrack: Buppah Rahtree, was released to accompany the film. It features a mix of Thai hip hop and pop music. Most of the tracks feature members of Joey Boy's rap collective Gancore Club, the heavyset duo BZ and Fukking Hero, who were also featured in the film as residents of a neighboring apartment to Rahtree's.

=== Track listing ===
1. "Kruey mai klub" (กลัวมั้ยครับ) (Beat Mix) - BZ and Fukking Hero with Thinny-P (2:50)
2. "Sorry 4" - Cazh (3:58)
3. "Buppah Rahtree" - Panadda (4:43)
4. "Pee loke" (ผีหลอก) BZ and Fukking Hero with Gin-Meeh (3:26)
5. "Lhub"/"P.O.P." - Fukking Hero featuring Zentrady (4:40)
6. "Yoo" (อยู่ ) - Pakeeta (5:24)
7. "Mai klub mah" - Maf (4:22)
8. "662" - A.Y.M. (4:25)
9. "Ar deed" - Maf (4:53)
10. "Buppah Rahtree" - Demo (3:04)

== See also ==
- Phi Tai Hong
- Night-blooming jasmine (Thai: ราตรี; RTGS: ratri)
