= Clueless (disambiguation) =

Clueless is a 1995 American comedy by Amy Heckerling and starring Alicia Silverstone.

Clueless may also refer to:

- Clueless (TV series), a television series based on the film
- Clueless (novels), a series of novels by H.B. Gilmour and Randi Reisfeld based on the film characters
- Clueless (musical)
- Clueless CD-ROM, a product by Mattel based on the Clueless franchise
- Clueless (2010 film), a Thai comedy film
- Clueless (game show), a Polish game show
- "Clueless" (House), an episode of House
- "Clue-Less", an episode of Lizzie McGuire
- "Clueless", an episode of Moloney
- "Clueless", an episode of The Oval
- "Clueless", an episode of Pregnant in Heels
- "Clue-Less", an episode of The Replacements
- "Clueless", an episode of Schooled
- "Clueless", a song by Beach Bunny
- "Clueless", a song by Polo G

== See also ==
- Emma (novel)
