= Miss Suwanna of Siam =

1923 film by Henry MacRae

- Directed by: Henry MacRae; Robert Kerr (assistant dir.)
- Written by: Henry MacRae
- Starring: Sa-ngiam Navisthira; Yom Mongkhonnat; Mongkhon Sumonnat
- Cinematography: Dal Clawson
- Distributed by: Universal Studios
- Release date: June 22, 1923
- Countries: Thailand; United States

Miss Suwanna of Siam (Thai: นางสาวสุวรรณ; RTGS: Nang Sao Suwan; lit. 'Miss Suvarṇa'), was a 1923 romance film written and directed by Henry MacRae, set in Thailand (then Siam) and starring Thai actors. It was one of the first feature films made in Thailand and the first Hollywood co-production in Thailand.

Nothing of the film exists today except for some promotional materials and other ephemera held at the Thailand National Film Archive.

== Plot ==
The film is a romance about a young woman named Suwanna who is the object of affection for many men. In her search for true love, she has many adventures and mishaps, including overcoming her father's disapproval, before finally finding her soulmate.

== Cast ==
- Sa-ngiam Navisthira (Later Anindhita Akhubutra) as Suwanna
- Khun Ram Pharotsat (Yom Mongkhonnat) as Klahan
- Luang Pharotkamkoson (Mongkhon Sumonnat) as Kongkaew

== Crew ==
- Director – Henry MacRae
- Assistant director – Robert Kerr (He returned to Siam in 1928 to direct his own film, The White Rose. It was shown in Bangkok in September 1928.)
- Cinematographer – Dal Clawson

== Premiere ==
Suwanna of Siam was an 8-reel silent film. It premiered on June 22, 1923, at the Nakhon Si Thammarat Theatre and then opened the next day at the Phatthanakon Cinematograph, the Hong Kong Cinema Hall and the Victoria Theater.

A newspaper account of the opening reads:

On Saturday night last, there were record attendances to witness the film 'Suvarna of Siam' and incidentally to aid in support of the Siam Red Cross, the management having most generously undertaken to give all the takings to that most excellent institution. H.R.H. Admiral the Prince of Nagor Rajasima [sic] was present at the Phathanakorn, where a most excellent programme was provided. Naturally an immense amount of interest centered upon 'Suvarna of Siam' the local drama-film upon which Mr. Henry Macrae, Mr. Robert Kerr and Mr. Dal Clawson have been at work for some time past. The film is of special interest as it is the first big thing of the kind ever made in this country and it has been so constructed as to afford the greatest collection possible of scenic backgrounds, thus affording a sort of panorama of the country with the story of Suvarna running through it all, like the leit motif of an opera. The story itself has all the necessary features of melodrama, love, hate, revenge, injured innocence, false accusation, man-slaughter, etc., etc., and it all ends up nicely and pleasantly with the long-lost heir coming to his own and the lovers wandering off hand in hand into the bright future. And all this wanders through a lot of real life scenes, from Their Royal Highnesses the Princes Damrong and Purachatra sitting "at the receipt of custom" to "elephants a pilin' teak," golf at Hua Hin, the Raek Na ceremony, a Bangkok fire, and views upon views of palaces and wats, incidentally proving a really first-class advertisement to the State Railways and various other of Siam's modernities. The film is certainly well worth seeing, from the scenic standpoint alone and all concerned in its production merit all credit for good work well done. It will be shown to-night again at the Phathanakorn and Hong Kong cinemas and we certainly advise all who have not seen it to do so. – Bangkok Daily Mail, Monday, 25 June 1923

== Production ==
Production started in 1922, but before he could begin filming, MacRae had to first ask for permission from the Siamese Royal Court.

"Today Mr Henry A. MacRae came to see me. I assured him of two things: first, traveling; second, finding a place for film processing and screening. Above these, he has to take care of himself. For our benefit, he has to give a copy of the film to the State Railway in return...", an excerpt from the writings of Prince of Kamphaengphet reads, in reaction to a visit by MacRae who wanted to "take picture[s] of Bangkok and the Beauties of Siam, including the King and the Palace Buildings."

"I felt that His Majesty, King Rama VI, would be interested in moving pictures," McRae wrote in The Film Year Book (1924). "And after considerable maneuvering, I finally secured an audience which resulted in securing the entire [Royal Entertainment] Company's assistance together with the free use of the King's 52 automobiles, His Majesty's 600 race horses, the free use of the navy, the Royal Palaces, the railways, the rice mills, thousands of miles of rice fields, coconut groves, klongs and Elephants, and white elephants at that."

Ultimately, according to Thai film scholar Chalida Uabumrungjit, the Siamese government "allowed the making of this film in order to show the world the positive image of Siam at the time. Therefore, many incidents in the film featured the modern elements in the Thai society such as travelling by express train or mail plane."

== Controversy and disappearance ==
When MacRae finished the film, he did give a copy to the Royal State Railway, per his agreement with Prince of Kamphaengphet. The railway agency had a Public Relations Division that oversaw film production as a means to promote tourism in the kingdom (which is much the same as the modern-day Tourism Authority of Thailand operates in its promotional activities regarding film productions and the Bangkok International Film Festival). MacRae also turned over a copy to King Vajiravudh. It was shown in Bangkok for three days, but soon after it was lost.

Film historians have searched, but the negatives of the film have not been found anywhere, nor is there evidence the film was even shown in the United States upon MacRae's return.

One reason it may have been lost is due to a controversial scene in the film, in which MacRae filmed an execution of a prisoner, which led to criticism in the local media.

"I would like to blame the local officer who did not save the honor of the country by forbidding them to do so. The execution will represent the barbarism of Siam," a columnist said in the newspaper, Sambhand Thai.

The movie was subject to censorship, and it is believed that the execution scenes were cut.

== Legacy ==
While research and discussion about Miss Suwanna has long been the province of film historians and scholars, the subject of the film received mainstream attention as a major plot point in the 2006 Thai comedy, Nong Teng Nakleng-pukaotong (literally, Nong and Teng, the Golden Mount Gangsters). The story involves a likay performer (portrayed by Pongsak Pongsuwan) in 1923 Siam who finds his family's troupe being evicted from his theater to make way for a new phenomenon being brought to Siam by foreigners – film. Together with his friend (Choosak Eamsuk), Nong seeks to disrupt the production of Miss Suwanna, which he sees as a corruptive influence on traditional culture.

== Alternate titles ==
Despite the Royal Thai General System of Transcription for transliteration of Thai into English, the title of Miss Suwanna of Siam is stated many different ways. The title character's name has been alternately stated as Suwann, Suwan, Suwarn, Suvarn, Suwarna or Suvarna. The Thai title is Nang Sao Suwan, Nong Sao Suwan or Nangsao Suwan, with alternate English titles, The Gold of Siam or Kingdom of Heaven.

== See also ==
- Cinema of Thailand
- List of lost films
