= Ajoo =

South Korean singer

- Birth name: Noh Ah Joo (노아주)
- Born: July 6, 1990 (age 35)
- Origin: Seoul, South Korea
- Genres: K-pop
- Occupations: Singer; dancer; actor
- Years active: 2007–2010
- Labels: Stam Entertainment
- Website: Official page

Ajoo (Born Noh Ah-joo, (Korean: 노아주 on July 6, 1990) is a South Korean singer and dancer who debuted in 2008 with the single "1st Kiss".

Although his first single did not do as well as expected on music charts he made a comeback with "Paparazzi" which features labelmate and popular female solo artist Younha. Younha also wrote the lyrics for the song and appeared in the music video.

He released a single in early 2009 titled "재벌2세" ("Wealthy 2nd Generation"), which deals with the topic of rich, spoiled children. The song was banned in its original state from KBS, saying that the song was encouraging excessive, indulgent lifestyles; this was criticized by the public, saying that KBS's own dramas were guilty of the same thing, namely its hit Boys Over Flowers.

In 2010 he starred in a Thai film Kaorak thi kaoli Sorry saranghaeyo by Poj Arnon, as himself.

== Discography ==
Album #	Album information	Copies sold	Tracks
1st	1st Kiss – Single: Released: February 18, 2008; Length: N/A; Language: Korean	N/A	1. 첫 키스; 2. Alarm 06:00; 3. 첫 키스 (Instrumental); 4. Alarm 06:00 (Instrumental)
2nd	Paparazzi – EP: Released: July 7, 2008; Length: N/A; Language: Korean	N/A	1. Paparazzi(Feat. 윤하, 태완 a.k.a. C-Luv); 2. Lady Lady; 3. Crazy Love(Feat. 현무 (Of Trespass)); 4. 무릎 꿇고; 5. Paparazzi (Instrumental); 6. 무릎 꿇고 (Instrumental)
3rd	Wealthy 2 Generation: Released: February 2, 2009; Length: N/A; Language: Korean	N/A	1. Everything Is in My Hands; 2. Wealthy 2 Generation; 3. Wealthy 2 Generation (Instrumental)
