= Choosak Eamsuk =

Thai actor, comedian and former dancer (born 1973)

- Born: Choosak Eamsuk; June 7, 1973 (age 52); Ongkharak, Nakhon Nayok, Thailand
- Citizenship: Thai
- Education: Wat Matchan Tikaram School
- Occupations: Actor; comedian; dancer; MC
- Years active: 1981–present
- Known for: Ching Roi Ching Lan; Raberd Terd Terng
- Spouse: Kanyanat "Nok" Eamsuk
- Children: 2, including Sivanat "Buhri" Eamsuk and Pakin "Deer" Eamsuk
- Relatives: Nui Chernyim (brother)

Choosak Eamsuk or spelt Chusak Iamsuk (Thai: ชูศักดิ์ เอี่ยมสุข, nicknamed Nong), known professionally as Nong Cha-cha-cha (โหน่ง ชะชะช่า) is a famous Thai comedian, actor, and former dancer.

== Biography and career ==
He was born in Ongkharak, Nakhon Nayok province, about 81.5 km (50.6 mi) northeast of Bangkok. Eamsuk entered the showbiz at the age of 12 as a dancer for many country bands and began to show a stand-up comedy. He then became a dancer for cabaret show in Pattaya where he met his wife.

After he became a comedian in the popular comedy troupe Chernyim, he was invited by Petchtai Wongkamlao (Mum Jokmok) to be the MC of the TV show Ching Roi Ching Lan by Workpoint Entertainment in 1998. It made him famous and widely known ever since. Eamsuk was one of the MCs with Pongsak Pongsuwan (Theng Therdtherng) and Sudarat Butrprom (Tukky Samcha).

His younger brother Chukiat Eamsuk (Nui Chernyim) is also a famous comedian.

In addition to the performing career, he is also the owner of the noodle franchise, Nong Cha-cha-cha noodle, which has branches in various locations.

== Filmography ==
- Phi mae mai pai daeng (1995)
- Headless Hero (2002) (cameo)
- Man of Ma Year (2003) (cameo)
- The Bodyguard (2004) (guest)
- Pattaya Maniac (2004) (first lead role)
- Formalin Man (2004)
- Beautiful Wonderful Perfect (2005)
- In The Name Of The Tiger (2005)
- Warewolf In Bangkok (2005)
- Nong Teng Nakleng-pukaotong (2005)
- Teng Nong kon maha hia (2007)
- The Bodyguard 2 (2007) (guest)
- Wo maba maha sanuk (2008)
- Little Cupid (2008)
- 32nd December Love Error (2009)
- Clueless (2010)
- Tukky, jaoying khaai gop (2010)
- Saturday Killer (2010) (with Cris Horwang)
- I Am Grandmother (2010)
- Teng Nong jiworn bin (2011)
- Friday Killer (2011) (guest)
- This Girl Is Bad Ass (2011)
- Mai ka Mam don ka don (2011)
- Cat a Wabb (2015)
- Thailand Only (2017)
- Happy New You (2019)
- Nak Loves Mak Sooo Much! (2025) (first directed and also co-starred)

== Awards ==
- Asian Television Awards 2008 (Best Comedy Performance by an Actor)
