= Sai Lor Fah =

- The Thai movie poster.
- Directed by: Yuthlert Sippapak
- Written by: Yuthlert Sippapak
- Produced by: Yuthlert Sippapak
- Starring: Choosak Eamsuk; Somchai Kemglad; Pitchanart Sakakorn; Somlek Sakdikul; Black Pomthong; Petchtai Wongkamlao
- Cinematography: Prapop Duangpikul
- Edited by: Tawat Siripong
- Music by: Vichaya Vatanasapt
- Distributed by: GTH
- Release date: 7 October 2004
- Running time: 109 minutes
- Country: Thailand
- Language: Thai

Sai Lor Fah (Thai: สายล่อฟ้า or Pattaya Maniac) is a 2004 Thai crime-comedy film written and directed by Yuthlert Sippapak. Filmed on location in Pattaya, it is the story of friends who become mixed up in an escalating series of crimes.

== Plot ==
Tun and Tao are friends who enjoy spending time together in karaoke bars in Pattaya. Tao has the bad habit, however, of always singing a loud, off-key rendition of the Asanee-Wasan song "Sai Lor Fah" ("Lighting Rod"), which always results in Tao and his friends being thrown out of the club.

Tao is dealer of counterfeit DVDs, but his real vocation is gambling and he frequently bets on Premier League soccer. He finally wins some money and decides to pay back a 100,000 baht loan from Tun and also treat Tun to a big night out at the city's finest karaoke club.

At the club, the shy, portly Tun meets a young woman, Nok, shares a duet with her, and ends up taking her back to his house. The next morning, Nok disappears. It turns out she is the mistress of Mee, a local crime kingpin, and Tao paid her for a one-time deal to sleep with his friend. Tun, a dealer in rare Buddhist amulets, becomes obsessed with finding Nok. He gives the 100,000 baht he received from Tun to a transvestite pimp who might have a lead on Nok.

Tun, meanwhile, is involved with crimes of his own, and has become beholden to Mee and a rival kingpin, Moo, who are both interested in obtaining a rare amulet that Tun has in his possession. In a complicated scheme, Tao ends up perpetuating the kidnapping of a wealthy American man's daughter, and holding her for 3 million baht ransom. Also, a shadowy female assassin has entered the picture to complicate matters.

== Cast ==
- Choosak Eamsuk as Tun
- Somchai Kemglad as Tao
- Pitchanart Sakakorn as Nok
- Somlek Sakdikul as Moo
- Black Pomthong as Mee
- Petchtai Wongkamlao

=== Casting notes ===
- Choosak Eamsuk (also known as Nong Cha Cha Cha) is a popular comedian and comic actor in Thailand. He was cast in the leading dramatic role, a trademark of director Yuthlert Sippapak. In a further role reversal, Somchai Kemglad, an actor who played the dramatic lead in Yuthert's debut film, Killer Tattoo, was given the comic relief role in Sai Lor Fah.
