= The Holy Man =

The Holy Man (Luang Phii Teng)
- Theatrical film poster
- Directed by: Note Cherm-Yim; Bamrer Phongintakun
- Written by: Theeratorn Siriphunvaraporn
- Produced by: Thawatchai Phanpakdee; Sukhum Mathawanit
- Starring: Pongsak Pongsuwan; Somlek Sakdikul
- Cinematography: Vichian Raungvichayakul
- Edited by: Sunit Asavinikul
- Distributed by: Phra Nakorn Film
- Release date: 3 March 2005
- Running time: 91 minutes
- Country: Thailand
- Language: Thai

The Holy Man (Thai: หลวงพี่เท่ง or Luang Phii Teng) is a 2005 Thai religious comedy film. One of the top films at the Thai box office that year, it starred popular Thai television comedian, Pongsak Pongsuwan as a Buddhist monk. It is the first of a comic trilogy about young monks.

== Synopsis ==
A monk comes to a small city and takes up residence at a small Buddhist temple. With his no-nonsense advice and humble ways, a new monk builds a following that starts to rival a flashy scam temple across town, making an enemy of its operator (Somlek Sakdikul).

== Cast ==
- Pongsak Pongsuwan
- Note Chernyim
- Sarawut Poomthong
- Sawika Chaiyadech

== Casting ==
Another popular comic, Petchtai Wongkamlao, is featured in a small role.
