= Cheerleader Queens =

- Film poster
- Directed by: Poj Arnon
- Written by: Haokrati Film
- Produced by: Chareon Iamphongporn
- Starring: Montonn Pariwat; Wongeap Kunarattanawat; Sumet Saelee; Sittichai Leonseri; Prathanporn Puwadolpitak
- Cinematography: Panya Nimchareonpong
- Edited by: Sunit Asawanitkul
- Music by: Sunit Asawanitkul
- Production company: Five Star Production
- Release date: 21 February 2003
- Running time: 119 minutes
- Country: Thailand
- Language: Thai

Cheerleader Queens (Thai: ว้ายบึ้ม! เชียร์กระหึ่มโลก; aka I'm Lady) is a 2003 Thai comedy film directed by Poj Arnon.

== Plot ==
Four kathoey—Mod, Som, Kam-pang and Wa-wa—move from a rural town to attend St. Mary's High School in Bangkok. Once there they try to join the school's cheerleading team, only to be rejected because of their sexuality. Instead, they join the school's struggling rugby team, making friends with the other team members after they score a number of tries in an important game.

Toey, another kathoey from the boys' hometown, comes to Bangkok with the idea of forming a new cheerleading team, which they name "The Queen". From the start the boys have to face a number of problems, but with the help of their friends on the rugby team they manage to get to the finals of the national cheerleading competition.

== Reception ==
Ronnie Scheib of Variety reviewed Cheerleader Queens at the 2004 New York Lesbian, Gay, Bisexual, & Transgender Film Festival. He described the film as, "A fun date flick for all persuasions, with sexual content limited to a few chaste kisses and endless eye-batting innuendo, kitschy curio should perform cheerily on the gay fest circuit."
