= SARS Wars =

2004 Thai film

- Thai theatrical poster
- Directed by: Taweewat Wantha
- Written by: Sommai Lertulan; Kuanchun Phemyad; Taweewat Wantha; Adirek Wattaleela; Andrew Biggs
- Produced by: Akaradech Maneeploypech; Pracha Maleenont; Brian L. Marcar; Adirek Wattaleela
- Starring: Suthep Po-ngam; Supakorn Kitsuwon; Phintusuda Tunphairao; Lena Christensen; Somlek Sakdikul
- Cinematography: Art Srithongkul
- Edited by: Doctor Head
- Distributed by: Chalermthai Studio
- Release date: December 16, 2004
- Running time: 95 minutes
- Country: Thailand
- Language: Thai

SARS Wars (Thai: ขุนกระบี่ผีระบาด or Khun krabi phirabat, also subtitled Bangkok Zombie Crisis) is a 2004 Thai action fantasy comedy horror film directed and co-written by Taweewat Wantha.

The story involves people who are infected with a fictional Type 4 strain of the SARS virus and turned into zombies. The outbreak is contained to one apartment building in Bangkok, and the Health Ministry is determined to keep it contained at all costs. But the building also happens to be the hideout for a gang that has kidnapped a teenage schoolgirl. She is to be rescued by a sword-wielding superhero crimefighter, who must not only contend with the criminals, but also the zombies in a race against the government's plan to blow the building up.

Though it starred popular comic actors Suthep Po-ngam and Somlek Sakdikul, the movie fared poorly in Thailand but went on to attain cult film status by playing at such film festivals as the Fantasia Festival and the Amsterdam Fantastic Film Festival and through a DVD release that included English subtitles. The movie is available on US region 1 DVD from Discotek Media.

Similar to Kill Bill, it contains animated sequences, including an animated opening-title sequence, establishing the film's leading zombie fighters as comic book superheroes. It also contains references to Star Wars, Crouching Tiger, Hidden Dragon and The Matrix.

== Plot ==
Thailand's leading health official, Public Health Minister Ratsuda, declares Thailand free of the SARS virus and that Thailand's superior technology and medical research will prevent the disease from occurring in the kingdom.

However, far away in Africa, there has been an outbreak of a mutant Type 4 strain of the SARS virus, which causes sufferers to turn into bloodthirsty zombies when they die. A hornet carrying the virus from Africa is hit by an airliner and lands in Thailand. It flies into the open window of a farang driving a Volvo and stings the man on the back of his neck. The man becomes patient zero in the outbreak of SARS 4. He returns to his apartment building and infects others in his building. Among the zombified creatures is a giant Burmese python named Albert.

Meanwhile, Catholic school girl Liu is kidnapped by a gang led by a transvestite named Yai, who dressed as a sexy woman in a bikini and used a furry as a distraction. Liu's father, an influential businessman, does not wish to involve the police, so he turns to his old friend Master Thep. Thep, injured from his last outing, assigns his top student swordsman, Khun Krabii, to rescue Liu.

Krabii soon finds himself at the building, where he finds Liu and attempts to rescue her, but is then stopped by Yai and his men, and then they encounter the zombies.

Master Thep, sensing his student needs help, goes to the building, just as the Health Ministry has sent in some men, and a woman doctor, Dr. Diana, who for some reason is wearing bondage gear under her biocontainment suit. She has a trial vaccine that she hopes will cure the zombies, but instead only makes their heads explode. Thep attempts to use his magic sword, but its batteries are low and it does not function.

Krabii and Liu have a romantic scene, and then they encounter a pregnant woman who has turned into a zombie and now her baby is a zombie. The fetus flies out of her womb and bites Krabii, who turns into a zombie himself. He is so distraught that he tries to "kill" himself again by drinking household chemicals. In a stroke of luck, however, the combination of chemicals does not kill Krabii, but in fact cures him of the virus.

Liu is eaten by the giant zombie python, and Master Thep saves her, and also retrieves some batteries from the snake's stomach, which had been swallowed earlier, so his sword works again.

Then the building is set to explode – part of the containment plan by the health minister – but Master Thep has a remote control that stops the explosion.

It is revealed that Liu is in fact the transvestite Yai, wearing a rubber mask, meaning that Krabii lost his virginity to a man. An animated backstory reveals how Yai found Liu's clothes. Later it is revealed through another animated segment that Liu survived the struggle with Yai, and that she and Krabii will live happily ever after.

== Cast ==
- Suthep Po-ngam as Master Thep
- Supakorn Kitsuwon as Khun Krabii
- Phintusuda Tunphairao as Liu
- Lena Christensen as Dr. Diana
- Andrew Biggs as Zombie
- Naowarat Yuktanan as Minister Ratsuda
- Somlek Sakdikul as Yai
- Boriwat Yuto as Party Boy

=== Casting notes ===
- The leading zombie, Andrew Biggs, is a Bangkok-based Australian journalist. A fluent Thai speaker, he is a prominent personality on Thai TV Channel 3, co-hosting a talk show and offering tips on speaking English. In the deleted scenes on the DVD, it is revealed that his character was originally to be a scientist whose plan to create an anti-virus was squashed by the health minister. He then goes mad and infects himself with the SARS virus. However, that part of the script was rewritten so that he was simply a man in his car who is bitten by the SARS bug.
- Minister Ratsuda, portrayed by Naowarat Yuktanan, resembles the Thailand's health minister at the time, Sudarat Keyuraphan, a key member of the cabinet in the administration of Thaksin Shinawatra.
