= Sorry Saranghaeyo =

- Film poster
- Thai: เการักที่เกาหลี Sorry ซารังเฮโย
- Directed by: Poj Arnon
- Written by: Poj Arnon
- Produced by: Thawatchai Phanpakdee; Poj Arnon
- Starring: Haru Yamaguchi; Ajoo; Saran Sirilak; Guy Ratchanont; Patrick Paiyer
- Production companies: Phranakorn Film Co. Ltd. Samong-Gu Film
- Distributed by: Phranakorn Film Co. Ltd.
- Release date: 8 July 2010
- Running time: 152 minutes
- Country: Thailand
- Languages: Thai; Korean; English

Sorry Saranghaeyo (Thai: เการักที่เกาหลี Sorry ซารังเฮโย; Kaorak thi kaoli Sorry saranghaeyo; Korean: 쏘리 사랑해요) is a 2010 Thai film written and directed by Poj Arnon.

== Summary ==
Kana, a Thai girl who obsesses over the Korean drama The Prince of Red Shoe, travels to South Korea with her family and friends.

There, she accidentally meets her favorite idol Ajoo, and chaos follows.

== Cast ==
- Haru Yamaguchi as Kana (Chinese kale)
- Ajoo as Himself
- Saran Sirilak as Won
- Kachapa Toncharoen as Elisa
- Thanya Rattanamalakul as Mara (Gourd) (before surgery)
- Patrick Paiyer as Zen
- Guy Ratchanont as Chai
- Phutawan Techatewnich as Kwangtung (Bok choy)
- Wasana Chalakorn as Grandma
- Nareekrajang Kantamas as Mom
- Pan Plutaek as Dad
- Anusorn Naiyanan as Methun (Gemini)
- Hedpoh Chernyim as Cherry
- Sarinee Dokkadone as Strawberry
- Meytika Puttavibul as Muaylek (Maknae)
- Arisara Thongborisut as Mara (after surgery) (cameo)
- Pavarisa Phenjati as Herself (cameo)
- Lim So Hee as Korean surgeon (cameo)
- Oh Chang Suk as Ajoo's manager (cameo)

== Trivia ==
The title of The Prince of Red Shoe, the Korean drama that Kana is addicted to, is a parody of the 2009 Thai entertainment scandal when famous singer Nathan Oman claimed he was filming a Hollywood movie entitled The Prince of Red Shoe in the Middle East alongside world-class performers Bruce Willis and Christina Ricci. He also claimed that the movie was directed by Wolfgang Petersen. However, it was soon discovered that the entire story was fake.

== See also ==
- Hello Stranger
