= Kohtee Aramboy =

Thai actor

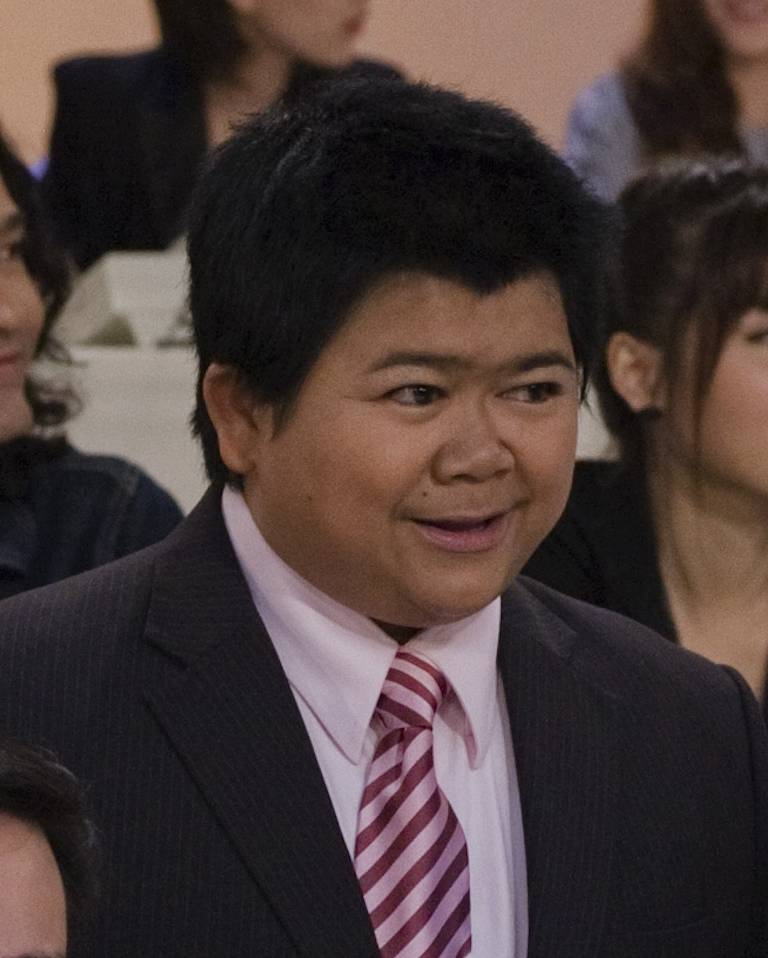
Kotee Aramboy

Kohtee Aramboy (Koti / Kotee) (Thai: โก๊ะตี๋ อารามบอย) or Jaroenporn Onlamai (Thai : เจริญพร อ่อนละม้าย; born 31 December 1980) is a Thai actor and comedian known for his distinctive chubby appearance often portraying himself as a childlike character. He has starred in several Thai films, and dramas. He is one of the most popular comedians in Thailand.

== Early life and career ==
Kohtee Aramboy was born on 31 December 1980 in Ang Thong Province to Boonmee and Daoreuang Onlamai. He has an older brother named Siam Onlamai. As a child, he studied at Wat Tha It School in Ang Thong Province and had very good grades. He continued his education until Mathayom 2 (equivalent to 8th grade) at Pho Thong Chinnamani School in Ang Thong Province. However, he did not take the final exam and ran away from home to join a Likay (Thai folk opera) troupe for a while. He then went to help his older sister sell vegetables in Phichit Province, where he sang Likay while selling vegetables. This caught the attention of someone who recommended he seek help from a monk who was highly respected by singers and actors.

He entered the entertainment industry at the age of 13–14 and joined the Eddy the Cute Ghost comedy troupe. At that time, he performed under the name "KotaTee Cute Ghost" due to his hairstyle, which resembled a ghost, using "Kota" as his nickname. Later, he changed his name to "Kohtee Aramboy" after gaining recognition from the movie Kohtee Aramboy: The Hero of Aramboy (โก๊ะตี๋ วีรบุรุษอารามบอย). He then formed his own comedy troupe and also had his own chicken rice business called Ko Tee Chicken Rice.

== Personal life ==
He was married to Supak Jarutanan, nicknamed Kwang, on December 17, 2023. They are now divorced. Kohtee announced the news via his Instagram on the evening of January 2, 2024.

== Filmography ==
- 1998 : โก๊ะตี๋ วีรบุรุษอารามบอย
- 2004 : Spicy Beautyqueen of Bangkok (ปล้นนะยะ)
- 2005 : Dumber Heroes (พยัคฆ์ร้ายส่ายหน้า)
- 2006 : The Thai Thief (ไทยถีบ)
- 2006 : The Magnificent Five (พระ - เด็ก - เสือ - ไก่ - วอก)
- 2006 : Khan Kluay (The Blue elephant / ก้านกล้วย) (Cartoon)
- 2006 : The Last Song (เพลงสุดท้าย)
- 2006 : See How They Run (โกยเถอะโยม)
- 2006 : Zapp (แซ่บ)
- 2006 : Noodle Boxer (แสบสนิท ศิษย์ส่ายหน้า)
- 2006 : มากับพระ
- 2007 : หอแต๋วแตก
- 2007 : Kung Fu Tootsie (ตั๊ดสู้ฟุด)
- 2007 : Ponglang Amazing Theater (โปงลางสะดิ้ง ลำซิ่งส่ายหน้า)
- 2007 : The Three Cripples (เหยิน เป๋ เหล่ เซมากูเตะ)
- 2008 : The Ghost and Master Boh (ผีตาหวานกับอาจารย์ตาโบ๋)
- 2008 : บ้านผีเปิบ
- 2008 : April Road Trip (คู่ก๊วนป่วนเมษา)
- 2008 : Teng's Angel (เทวดาท่าจะเท่ง)
- 2008 : หนุมานคลุกฝุ่น
- 2008 : หัวหลุดแฟมิลี่
- 2009 : โหดหน้าเหี่ยว 966
- 2009 : สาระแน ห้าวเป้ง!!!
- 2009 : Oh My Ghosts! (หอแต๋วแตก แหกกระเจิง)
- 2010 : สาระแนสิบล้อ
- 2010 : สามย่าน (Director)
- 2010 : The Dog (ชิงหมาเถิด)
- 2010 : The Holy Man III
- 2010 : The Headless Family (Director)
- 2010 : H2-Oh! (น้ำ ผีนองสยองขวัญ)
- 2010 : Cool Gel Attacks (กระดึ๊บ)
- 2010 : สุดเขต สเลดเป็ด
- 2010 : สาระแนเห็นผี
- 2011 : หอแต๋วแตก แหวกชิมิ
- 2011 : Mid Mile Racing Love (มิดไมล์ Racing Love)
- 2011 : Bangkok Sweety (ส.ค.ส. สวีทตี้)
- 2012 : Valentine Sweety (วาเลนไทน์ สวีทตี้)
- 2012 : Spicy Beauty Queen of Bangkok 2 (ปล้นนะยะ 2 อั๊ยยยย่ะ)
- 2012 : หอแต๋วแตก แหกมว๊ากมว๊ากกก
- 2012 : Crazy Crying Lady (คุณนายโฮ)
- 2013 : Oh My Ghost (OMG คุณผีช่วย)
- 2014 : Lupin the 3rd
- 2015 : Single Lady (ซิงเกิลเลดี้ เพราะเคยมีแฟน)
- 2015 : หอแต๋วแตก แหกนะคะ
- 2016 : หลวงพี่แจ๊ส 4G
- 2016 : ป๊าด 888 แรงทะลุนรก
- 2016 : Haunted School (โรงเรียนผี)
- 2016 : I Love You Two
- 2016 : จำเนียร วิเวียน โตมร
- 2018 : The Last Heroes (ตุ๊ดตู่กู้ชาติ)
- 2018 : หอแต๋วแตก แหกต่อไม่รอแล้วนะ
