= Siwadon Chantanasewi =

- ศิวดล จันทเสวี
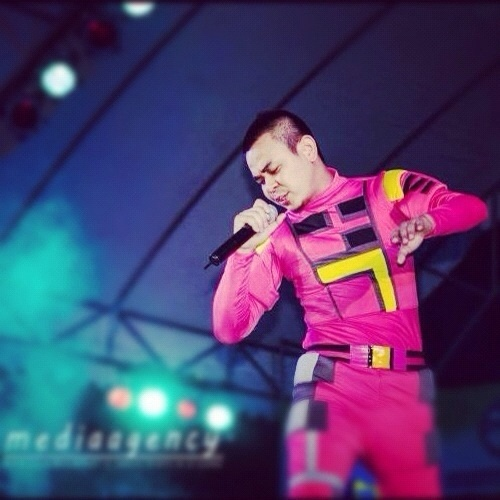
- Siwadon in 2013
- Born: Siwadon Chantanasewi; 26 December 1978 (age 47); Chai Nat, Thailand
- Other names: Toffy; Toffy 3.50
- Education: Nakhon Sawan Rajabhat University (NSRU)
- Occupations: Actor; Comedian; Singer; Film producer; Businessman
- Years active: 2007–present
- Agent: Workpoint Entertainment
- Spouse: Chanatda "Jull" Chantanasavee (m. 2016)
- Children: One son

Siwadon Chantanasewi (Thai: ศิวดล จันทเสวี; born December 26, 1978; nicknamed Toffy), better known by his stage name Toffy 3.50 is a Thai actor, comedian, singer.

== Career ==
He first rose to fame as an impersonator of Ang Therdtherng, another well-known Thai comedian. He later became a supporting actor and comedian under Workpoint Entertainment, as well as a host on several television programs. He is also the lead singer of the comedy parody band 3.50 Baht, which parodies the pop trio Room39. This is the origin of his familiar nickname, Toffy 3.50.

== Filmography ==
=== Films ===
- Tukky, Jao Ying Khaai Khob (ตุ๊กกี้ เจ้าหญิงขายกบ) (2010)
- Teng Nong Jiworn Bin (เท่ง โหน่ง จีวรบิน) (2011)
- Joking Jazz 4G (หลวงพี่แจ๊ส 4G) (2016)
- Oh My Ghost 4 (หอแต๋วแตก แหกนะคะ) (2015)
- The Fast And Furious 888 (ป๊าด 888) (2016)
- Joking Jazz 5G (หลวงพี่แจ๊ส 5G) (2017)
- Khao Kala (เขากะลา) (2026)

=== Television programs ===
- Gang of Gags (ตลก 6 ฉาก) (2007–2015)
- Ching Roi Ching Lan (ชิงร้อยชิงล้าน) (2008–2017)
- Raboet Therdtherng (2010–2015)
- Wongkamlao The Series (วงษ์คำเหลา เดอะซีรีส์) (2010)
- Gentleman Wongkhamlao (สุภาพบุรุษวงษ์คำเหลา) (2013)
- Oh, Teacher Khong (โอมเพี้ยงอาจารย์คง) (2022)

=== Television dramas ===
- Wiwa Wah Woon (วิวาห์ว้าวุ่น) (2010)
- Phu Khong Yod Rak (ผู้กองยอดรัก) (2015)
- My Secret Bride (เขาวานให้หนูเป็นสายลับ) (2019)
- Por Mai Lek Tai Song Tua (พ่อหม้ายเลขท้ายสองตัว) (2022)
- 35 Dara Show The Series (35 ดาราโชว์ เดอะซีรีส์) (2022)
- Secret Crush On You (แอบหลงรักเดอะซีรีส์) (2022)

== Personal life ==
In his personal life, he is a native of Chai Nat. He believes in UFOs and extraterrestrial life, claiming to have seen and experienced them since he was a student in his hometown. He has remained in contact with groups of like-minded people and has participated in activities at Khao Kala in Nakhon Sawan, a site sometimes described as Thailand's "Area 51" and a hotspot for UFO sightings in the country. In 2026, he served as a producer and also appeared in the semi-documentary film Khao Kala, which explores stories of Thai actors and singers with other individuals who claim to have encountered UFOs or extraterrestrial beings. Some even claimed to have nearly been abducted by aliens. The film had a brief theatrical run in early May of the same year. Several actors appeared as themselves, including Arnattapon Sirichumsang, Sheranut Yusanonda, Attapol Rujiprawat, and Akkharadet Yodjumpa. The film is set to have a sequel, E-San UFO Project, scheduled for release in 2027.

In his family life, he is married to Chanatda Chantanasavee, and they have one son together. In addition to his work in the show business, he also owns a business producing instant phở under the brand Jubfy.
