= The Sin (2004 film) =

- Film poster
- Directed by: Ong-Art Singlumpong
- Screenplay by: Vatinee Orakorn
- Story by: Monsak Kethsirinthep
- Produced by: Ong-Art Singlumpong; Nitat Kumdee
- Starring: Helen Nima; Andy-Watchra Thungkaprasert; Sorapong Chatree
- Cinematography: Chitti Urnorakankij; Krisorn Buramasing
- Edited by: Panutat Wisetwong
- Music by: Alhabet Scale
- Distributed by: R.S. Film
- Release date: 10 June 2004
- Running time: 95 minutes
- Country: Thailand
- Language: Thai

The Sin is 2004 Thai erotic drama thriller film a.k.a. Jan Dara 2 directed by Ong-Art Singlumpong.

== Cast ==
- Helen Nima as Riam
- Andy-Watchra Thungkaprasert as Dhep
- Sorapong Chatree as Cheng
