= The Intruder (2010 film) =

- Thai film poster for The Intruder
- Directed by: Thanadol Nualsuth; Thammanoon Sakulboonthanom
- Written by: Thammanoon Sakulboonthanom; Thanadol Nualsuth
- Story by: Poj Arnon
- Produced by: Thawatchai Phanpakdee; Poj Arnon
- Starring: Akara Amarttayakul; Kwankao Svetamaia; Apinya Sakuljaroensuk; Peerawish Bunnag
- Cinematography: Arnon Chunprasert
- Edited by: Sunit Asvinikul; Muanfun Uppatham
- Music by: Giant Wave
- Production company: Film Guru
- Distributed by: Phranakorn film
- Release date: April 29, 2010 (Thailand)
- Running time: 104 minutes
- Country: Thailand
- Language: Thai
- Box office: $120,630

The Intruder (Thai: เขี้ยวอาฆาต; RTGS: Khiao A-khat) also known as The Revenge of the King Cobra is a 2010 Thai horror film directed by Thanadol Nualsuth and Thammanoon Sakulboonthanom. Based on a story by filmmaker Poj Arnon, the plot involves an apartment complex in Thailand being overrun by vicious cobras.

The Intruder was the second highest grossing film in Thailand in its opening week, only being beaten by Iron Man 2. It received its North American premiere at the Festival du Nouveau Cinéma.

== Plot summary ==
In an old house next to an apartment complex in Thailand, a man is bitten to death by a snake. The special services and the media congregate but are only able to find a few snakes. Later, a group of cobras invade the building which threatens the lives of the inhabitants: a young landlady Panin (Kwankao Savetawimon), her aunt Pai (Wasana Chalakorn) who has set up a snake shrine, Panin's doctor ex-boyfriend Sadayu (Akara Amarttayakul), his younger brother Vick (Peerawish Bunnag), snake specialist Chai (Thanatorn Oudsahakul), airline stewardess Jan (Chawwadee Chernok), three rock musicians, three teenagers, plus two-timing husband Ponnapa (Aungkana Timdee), his wife Mon (Sarocha Watittapan) and their young daughter Kij (Sukol Pongsathat). Along with them is a TV reporter Paai (Apinya Sakuljaroensuk) who is secretly sending out clips of the gory events through her mobile phone.

== Release ==
The Intruder premiered in Thailand on April 29, 2010. On its first week, the film was the second highest grossing film in Thailand, only being beaten by Iron Man 2. The film grossed a total of $120,630 in Thailand.

The film received its North American premiere at the Festival du Nouveau Cinéma on October 19, 2010. The Intruder was shown in the Seattle International Film Festival on June 4, 2011.

== Reviews ==
Variety gave a generally favorable review of The Intruders praising the energetic performance of the cast, as well as noting that the "effects are decent for this type of fare." Film Business Asia gave the film a six out of ten rating, referring to the film as "good, trashy fun".
