= Ching Roi Ching Lan =

1990 Thai TV game show

- Also known as: Ching 100 The Story
- Created by: Praphas Cholsaranont
- Developed by: Workpoint Entertainment Public Co., Ltd.
- Starring: Siwat Chotchaicharin; Petchtai Wongkamlao; Pongsak Pongsuwan; Choosak Eamsuk; Boonyawan Pongsuwan; Panupan Krutto; Mayura Sawetsila; Sudarat Butrprom; Phanya Nirankul; Warattaya Nilkuha; Siwadon Chantanasewi
- Country of origin: Thailand
- Original language: Thai
- No. of episodes: 1,000+

Production
- Executive producer: Panich Sodsee
- Camera setup: Multi-camera
- Running time: 60 minutes (1990-1995); 120 minutes (1996-2023)

Original release
- Network: BBTV Channel 7
- Release: January 17, 1990 – December 31, 1997
- Network: BEC Channel 3
- Release: January 7 – September 30, 1998
- Network: RTATV Channel 5
- Release: October 7, 1998 – December 28, 2005
- Network: BBTV Channel 7
- Release: January 11, 2006 – December 27, 2011
- Network: BEC Channel 3
- Release: January 1, 2012 – June 28, 2015
- Network: Workpoint TV
- Release: July 5, 2015 – December 31, 2023

Ching Roi Ching Lan (Thai: ชิงร้อยชิงล้าน), also known as Ching 100 Ching 1,000,000, is a Thai game show. It was first introduced in 1990. It is one of the most popular game shows in Thailand and has survived on screen until now. The show is divided into four sections, and the participants are the hosts, the comedy actors and celebrity guests.

== History ==
Workpoint Entertainment Public Company Limited created Ching Roi Ching Lan with the co operation with Media of Medias Public Company Limited. The first episode was broadcast by BBTV Channel 7 on the 17 January 1990. The show has been modified several times during the period of broadcasting including the name of the show, run time, run duration and broadcast channels, including BBTV Channel 7, BEC Channel 3 and RTATV Channel 5. As of July 2015, Workpoint Creative TV is the broadcaster of this show. The show runs every Sunday at 14:30.

== Starring ==
Punya Nirunkul and Mayura Tanabut originally hosted the show with some comedians. Then in 1998, Gang 3 Cha joined the show. Gang 3 Cha is a group of comedians who participate in most parts of the show. In every episode of the show, three different celebrities are invited to participate in the show.

== Format ==
As of August 2015, the show is divided into five sections.

The first section is called "3 Cha Theatre", a short sit-com performed by Gang 3 Cha and the story ends within an episode.

The next part is called "Game 3 Cha", the 3 celebrities are separated into 3 teams with the comedians (Gang 3 Cha) and play games together. The winner(s) of the game is award one point. The format of the game is changed every week.

In "Ta Khon Chon Clip", human-ability clips around the world are shown, and the show will invite people that have similar abilities to do a task challenged by the host. The guest celebrities have to guess if they can accomplish the challenge. Guest celebrities will earn one point if their predictions are right.

The next part is called Wow Wow Wow. In this part Teng Terdterng (a member from Gang 3 Cha) will show a magic trick that every people in the show will say 'wow wow wow'. No points are given in this part. However, secrets to the trick is revealed at the very end of the show (After the prize money section).

Finally, all guest celebrities will exchange their points for a chance at the prize money (12 sticks is present, 10 of them have a diamond shaped gold ingot at the end (Called "Thang Wow" (Wow Sticks)) worth 10,000 bath each. And 2 of them have a diamond shaped black ingot at the end, worth no money. guest(s) that wins the "Game 3 Cha" Section is able to choose a stick (No sticks are awarded if the game ends with a three-ways tie), with extra stick(s) chosen by each guest that make the correct prediction in "Ta Khon Chon Clip" section of the show. All sticks chosen are pulled after the selections at the same time. The maximum prize money that guest celebrities can earn in each episode is 50,000 baht.)

== Popularity ==
In 2009, Bangkok University did research on 'The popularity of teenagers'. This data was collected to give parents and society to use this information as a consideration to decide on what action should they make to develop and help these teenagers. About 1000 teenagers age between 13 and 21 participated were asked on the research. 49.1 percent were boys and 50.9 percent were girls. The result shows that Ching Roi Ching Lan was the most popular game show for teenagers.

== Versions ==
The show has been modified many times due to the lack of popularity when it started. People's lifestyles at that time included going to bed very early, therefore night time shows were not so interesting. The name of the show has been changed seven times already, keeping the word 'Ching Roi Ching Lan' in every version.

Also, the famous of the show leading Workpoint sell the format of the show for several countries, such as Indonesia and Vietnam.

=== Local versions ===
1. Chingroi Chinglan (1990-1993)
2. Ching Roi Ching Lan Top Secret (1993-1994)
3. Ching Roi Ching Lan Once in a lifetime (Ching Roi Ching Lan Once) (1994-1995)
4. Ching Roi Ching Lan Super Game (1996-1998)
5. Ching Roi Ching Lan Cha Cha Cha (1998-2008, 2009-2011)
6. Ching Roi Ching Lan 20th Century Tuck (2008-2009)
7. Ching Roi Ching Lan Sunshine Day (2012-2015)
8. Ching Roi Ching Lan Wow Wow Wow (2015-2023)
9. Ching Roi The Story (2023)

=== International versions ===
Most international versions using the Wow Wow Wow format of the show.

Country	Title	Based on	Network	Number of seasons	Hosts	Broadcast dates
Indonesia	Cring Cring Wow Wow Wow	Ching Roi Ching Lan Wow Wow Wow	SCTV	1	Arie Untung Natasha Ryder	8 - 16 July, 2017
Vietnam	Kỳ tài Thách đấu - Wow Wow Wow	Ching Roi Ching Lan Wow Wow Wow	HTV7	4	Trường Giang	18 September, 2016 - 2 August, 2020
