= Rahtree Reborn =

- Thai film poster.
- Directed by: Yuthlert Sippapak
- Written by: Yuthlert Sippapak
- Produced by: Amorn Chanapai; Yuthlert Sippapak
- Starring: Mario Maurer; Laila Boonyasak
- Cinematography: Yukontorn Mingmongkon
- Edited by: Tawat Siripong
- Music by: Jadet Chawang; Payont Permsith; Origin Kampanee
- Distributed by: Sahamongkol Film International
- Release date: 9 April 2009
- Running time: 90 minutes
- Country: Thailand
- Language: Thai

Rahtree Reborn (Thai: บุปผาราตรี 3.1) (also known as Buppah Rahtree 3.1) is a 2009 Thai comedy-horror film written and directed by Yuthlert Sippapak. It is a sequel to the 2005 film, Buppah Rahtree Phase 2: Rahtree Returns.

== Plot ==
Ten years passing by, Buppha is reincarnated as a young girl named Pla who is abandoned by her mother, leaving her with her barber stepfather, who often beats her in his anger. As a result, she becomes a problem child who is bullied by her classmates at school.

One day, she takes a razor from her stepfather's barbershop and starts attacking people at school, after which she leaves and goes to Buppha's apartment, where she unexpectedly encounters a man who is masturbating. Pla is murdered by him and becomes a ghost which also haunts Buppha's apartment. She awakes Buppha's ghost and uses her to take her revenge against all men.

After word gets out that the apartment block is haunted, the unoccupied flats become an illegal casino, and the good-looking Rung, who has a sixth sense which enables him to see ghosts, moves in after his girlfriend breaks up with him. The death toll in the apartment block rises, and Rung and his friends are also chased by the girl's ghost.

One day, Rung meets Buppha, who used to be his tutor when he was a kid, in the communal space in the building. Soon, he falls in love with her. However, Rung isn't aware that his crush indeed is the haunting and dangerous spirit that he needs to avoid. But he is too late and his sweet dream turns to nightmare as Buppha is now on the hunt again.

== Cast ==
- Mario Maurer as Rung
- Laila Boonyasak as Buppah
- Santisuk Promsiri as Father
- Nudtawan Saksiri as Pla
- Somlek Sakdikul as Master Tong
- Chantana Kittiyapan as Sister Three
- Kristine Vongvanij as Ying
- Aang Terdterng as Security Guard (as Suton Vechkama)
- Saicheer Wongwirot as Neung
- Piya Chanasattu as Peud
- Supapit Kokphon as Moo
- Yosawat Sitiwong as Tee
