= Nong Teng Nakleng-pukaotong =

- The Thai movie poster.
- Directed by: Panich Sodsee
- Written by: Punlop Sinjaroen
- Produced by: Surakrich Sattatam; Panich Sodsee
- Starring: Pongsak Pongsuwan; Choosak Eamsuk
- Edited by: Timsawat Smith
- Distributed by: Sahamongkol Film International
- Release date: March 30, 2006
- Country: Thailand
- Language: Thai

Nong Theng Nakleng-pukhaothong (Thai: โหน่ง เท่ง นักเลงภูเขาทอง or Nong and Teng, the Gangsters of Golden Mount) is a 2006 Thai comedy film starring Pongsak Pongsuwan and Choosak Eamsuk.

== Plot ==
In 1920s Siam, Bunteng, a member of a likay performing troupe, is faced with the prospect of his art dying when he and his family are threatened with eviction by a businessman who hopes to build a movie theater on the site of their stage. At the same time, the first Hollywood film, Miss Suwanna of Siam, is being made on location in the country. Seeing film as a corruptive influence on traditional Siamese culture, Bunteng, with the help of his gangster friend, Nong, sets about to disrupt the filming and keep his family from being evicted.

== Cast ==
- Pongsak Pongsuwan as Bunteng
- Choosak Eamsuk as Nong
- Isaree Soungcharern as Linchee
- Nikalaya Dhunlaya as Nuenchan
- Nui Choenyeun
- Petchtai Wongkamlao (cameo)
