= Ghost Station (film) =

- The Thai movie poster.
- Directed by: Yuthlert Sippapak
- Written by: Yuthlert Sippapak
- Produced by: Somsak Techaratanaprasert; Amorn Chanapai; Yuthlert Sippapak
- Starring: Kiattisak Udomnak; Nakorn Silachai
- Cinematography: Prapop Duangpikul
- Edited by: Tawat Siripong
- Music by: Stone Head
- Distributed by: Sahamongkol Film International
- Release date: 5 April 2007
- Running time: 103 minutes
- Country: Thailand
- Language: Thai

Ghost Station (Thai: โกยเถอะเกย์) is a 2007 Thai comedy-horror film directed by Yuthlert Sippapak as a spoof of Brokeback Mountain.

== Plot ==
Udd and Yai are a gay couple who love cowboy films and decide to move from the city to a rural area to create a more intimate, rustic setting for their relationship. They purchase an abandoned filling station and plan to settle down. However, Udd soon discovers that Yai is having an affair with Tangmo, a local woman who has a lesbian lover named Jenny. Neither Yai nor Tangmo is aware of each other's sexual histories, but Udd learns about the affair and plots to take revenge by having anal sex with his grandfather. Unbeknownst to them, Udd's grandfather is a zombie who lives with some frightening spirits.

== Cast ==
- Kiattisak Udomnak as Udd
- Nakorn Silachai as Yai
- Achita Sik-kamana as Tangmo
- Supassra Ruangwong as Jenny

== Production ==
After his previous film, Krasue Valentine, director-screenwriter Yuthlert Sippapak was in the process of developing his next project when he was on Khaosan Road in Bangkok and had a chance meeting with comedian Nakorn Silachai. Together, the two came up with the concept of Ghost Station.

"Ghost Station is a pure comedy," Yuthlert said in production notes for the film. "Most of my previous works have been mixed-genre films with comedy as a part of the overall concept ... Ghost Station will be my first-ever film using comedy as the main focal point and horror or romance for subplots."
