= The Last Heroes =

- Film poster
- Thai: ตุ๊ดตู่กู้ชาติ
- Directed by: M Mass Team
- Written by: Poj Arnon
- Produced by: Thanakorn Puriwekin; M Mass 65
- Starring: Mum Jokmok; Kohtee Aramboy; Tik Klinsee; Jim Chuanchuen; Nongbew Kawkong; Yong Armchair; Aukkarat Jittasiri; Rangsan Panyaruen; Arnon Saisangchan
- Cinematography: Arnon Chunprasert; Panya Nimcharoenpong
- Edited by: Muanfun Uppatham
- Music by: Giant Wave
- Production company: Film Guru
- Distributed by: M Pictures
- Release date: 24 May 2018
- Running time: 127 minutes
- Country: Thailand
- Languages: Thai; Burmese

The Last Heroes (Thai: ตุ๊ดตู่กู้ชาติ or Toot Too Ku Chart, literally: "National Liberation Ladyboys") is a 2018 Thai action-comedy film directed by M Mass Team (pseudonym of Poj Arnon). It is a spoof of the Bang Rajan in 2000.

== Storyline ==
A group of kathoey (Thai transgender) volunteers to spy in an enemy's city. To protect their homeland, village, family and friends, they have to find out the date that the enemy will attack.

== Cast ==
- Mum Jokmok as Faeng
- Kohtee Aramboy as Duen
- Tik Klinsee as Hom
- Jim Chuanchuen as Gon
- Nongbew Kawkong as Soi
- Yong Armchair as Krai
- Aukkarat Jittasiri as Boonthung
- Rangsan Panyaruen (Songkran The Voice) as Saeng
- Nappon Gomarachun as Anawrahta
- Arnon Saisangchan (Pu Black Head) as Yasodravati general

== Music ==
=== Original soundtrack ===
- "Toot Too Ku Chart" (ตุ๊ดตู่กู้ชาติ; "The Last Heroes"), ending theme by Tachaya "Keng" Prathumwan
- "La Rak" (ลารัก; "Farewell Love") by Thanasit "Ton" Jaturaput
- "Sang Chan" (แสงจันทร์; "Moonlight") by Pu Black Head
  - Original version by Maleehuana
- "Duen Pen" (เดือนเพ็ญ; "Full Moon") by Jennifer Kim
  - Lyrics by Asanee Poljantra
- "Trab Sin Lom Hai Jai" (ตราบสิ้นลมหายใจ; "Until The Breath Ends") by Yong Armchair

== Production ==
It took two years to create. The main filming location was Kanchanaburi.
