= Bangkok Haunted =

2001 film by Oxide Pang and Pisut Praesangeam

- Thai release poster
- Directed by: Oxide Pang; Pisut Praesangeam
- Written by: Pisut Praesangeam; Sompop Wetchapipat
- Produced by: Pisut Praesangeam; Jantima Liawsirikun
- Starring: Pimsiree Pimsee; Dawan Singha-wee
- Cinematography: Vichien Ruengvichayakun; Decha Srimunta; Nuttawut Kittikun
- Edited by: Piyapan Choopetch
- Music by: Orange Music
- Distributed by: RS Film
- Release dates: December 21, 2001 (Thailand); March 24, 2003 (United Kingdom); July 26, 2005 (United States)
- Running time: 130 minutes
- Country: Thailand
- Language: Thai

Bangkok Haunted (Thai: ผีสามบาท) is a 2001 Thai horror anthology film directed by Oxide Pang and Pisut Praesangeam. It consists of three ghost stories, as told by three people sitting around in a darkened Bangkok bar.

== Premise ==
=== '"Legend of the Drum'" ===
An antiques dealer discovers that a dancer's musical spirit possesses an old drum in her shop.

=== "Black Magic Woman" ===
A lonely young woman is given an aphrodisiac perfume that is extracted from corpses.

=== "Revenge" ===
A police cadet searches for the truth behind a girl's suicide by hanging.

== Cast ==
- Pimsiree Pimsee as Pagar
- Pramote Seangsorn
- Dawan Singha-Wee as Pan
- Kalyanut Sriboonrueng as Kanya
- Pete Thong-Jeur as Nop

== Release ==
At the time of its release in Thailand, Bangkok Haunted was the second-biggest-grossing Thai horror film since Nang Nak in 1999.

The film was screened at the London Thai Film Festival on October 13, 2002.

== Reception ==
Variety critic Derek Elley noted the film's atmospheric stylistic touches and technique, saying the first segment, Legend of the Drum, was the strongest in terms of storytelling. Black Magic Woman is "largely an excuse for soft-porn sequences between some yucky shocks", Elley wrote. He said Revenge has weak plot development and had an over-reliance on "flashy effects".

== Home media ==
Bangkok Haunted was released on Region 2 DVD on March 24, 2003 by Tartan Video and on Region 1 DVD on July 26, 2005 by Panik House Entertainment.

== Sequels ==
In the Philippines, the unrelated 2003 film The Unborn was released as Bangkok Haunted 2: The Unborn on August 18, 2004, though the film is set in Nakhon Sawan. The 2009 film Haunted Universities was also released in some territories as Bangkok Haunted 3; the film spawned two sequels, Haunted Universities 2nd Semester and Haunted Universities 3.

== See also ==
- List of ghost films
