= Romantic Blue =

- English language film poster
- Directed by: Rashane Limtrakul
- Screenplay by: Monsak Kethsirinthep; Dulyasit Niyomgul; Siwaporn Pongsuwan
- Story by: Pisut Praesangeam; Rashane Limtrakul
- Starring: Somchai Kemglad; Suttida Kasemsan Na Ayutthaya; Pramote Seangsorn
- Cinematography: Suthat Intaranupakorn
- Edited by: Piti Jaturaphat; Thanapon Thanangkul
- Music by: Traithep Wongpaiboon; Chamras Saewataporn
- Production company: R.S. Film
- Release date: 16 June 1995
- Running time: 112 minutes
- Country: Thailand
- Language: Thai

Romantic Blue (Thai: โลกทั้งใบให้นายคนเดียว, Lok Thang Bai Hai Nai Khon Diao) is a 1995 Thai romantic drama crime thriller film. The film stars the king of pop during the 1990s in Thailand, Somchai Kemglad, alongside Suttida Kasemsan. It was once an all-time top-grossing Thai film and winner of numerous awards. It was also the first film produced by RS Group.

== Plot ==
A young mechanic Mai and his educated younger brother Men fall in love with the same girl, Pom. Mai met Pom when he was working on Poms' father's car, and Men felt love at first sight when he saw Pom at school. Unfortunately, their father is sick and needs surgery. However, the hospital operation is too expensive and the brothers cannot afford the money, and even if Mai repairs 100 cars it will not be enough. Mai later is forced to get help from his criminal uncle Bo who teams Mai up with a crazy car thief. However, the thief turns out to be a real psycho and kills one of the security workers during the robbery. Mai dislikes the car thief's method and breaks the contract with him. Now the thief starts a personal manhunt against Mai and his brother.

== Cast ==
- Somchai Kemglad as Mai
- Suttida Kasemsan Na Ayutthaya as Pom
- Aaron Pavilai as Uncle Bo
- Pramote Seangsorn as Men
- Surasak Wonthai as Car Thief

== Awards ==
Won the 1995 Thailand National Film Association Awards for: Best Motion Picture, Best Director (Rashane Limtrakul), Best Leading Actor (Somchai Kemglad), Best Leading Actress (Suttida Kasemsan Na Ayutthaya), Best Supporting Actor (Aaron Pavilai), Best Movie Script, Best Film Editing, Best Cinematography.

Won the 1995 Entertainment Correspondents Association Of Thailand's Suraswadi Awards for: Best Leading Actress (Suttida Kasemsan Na Ayutthaya), Best Cinematography, Best Motion Picture (top-grossing).
