= Beautiful Wonderful Perfect =

- Thai theatrical poster
- Directed by: Poj Arnon
- Written by: Poj Arnon; Piyamat Machara
- Produced by: Poj Arnon
- Starring: Choosak Iamsook; Weerapak Kaensuwan; Nawarat Techarathanaprasert
- Cinematography: Panya Nimchareonpong
- Edited by: Muanfun Uppatham; Sunit Asavinikul
- Music by: Giant Wave
- Distributed by: Sahamongkol Film International
- Release date: 6 January 2005
- Running time: 100 minutes
- Country: Thailand
- Language: Thai

Beautiful Wonderful Perfect or Er rer (Thai: เอ๋อเหรอ) is a 2005 Thai family comedy film directed by Poj Arnon.

== Cast ==
- Veerapak Kansuwan as Tong
- Nawarat Techarathanaprasert as Luk-kaew
- Tat Na Takuatung as Preecha
- Choosak Iamsook as Sumruay
- Kanya Rattanapetch as Suay
- Pritsana Priesang as Wan
- Alisa Intusmith as Aew

== Awards ==
- 15th Suphannahong National Film Awards (2005) for
  - Best Supporting Actress - Sathita Kaewchaum
  - Best Actress - Nawarat Techarathanaprasert
  - Best Original Song - Nueng Nai Hua Chai Po by Saensaeb
