= Suttida Kasemsan Na Ayutthaya =

Thai actress and singer (born 1977)

- สุทธิดา เกษมสันต์ ณ อยุธยา
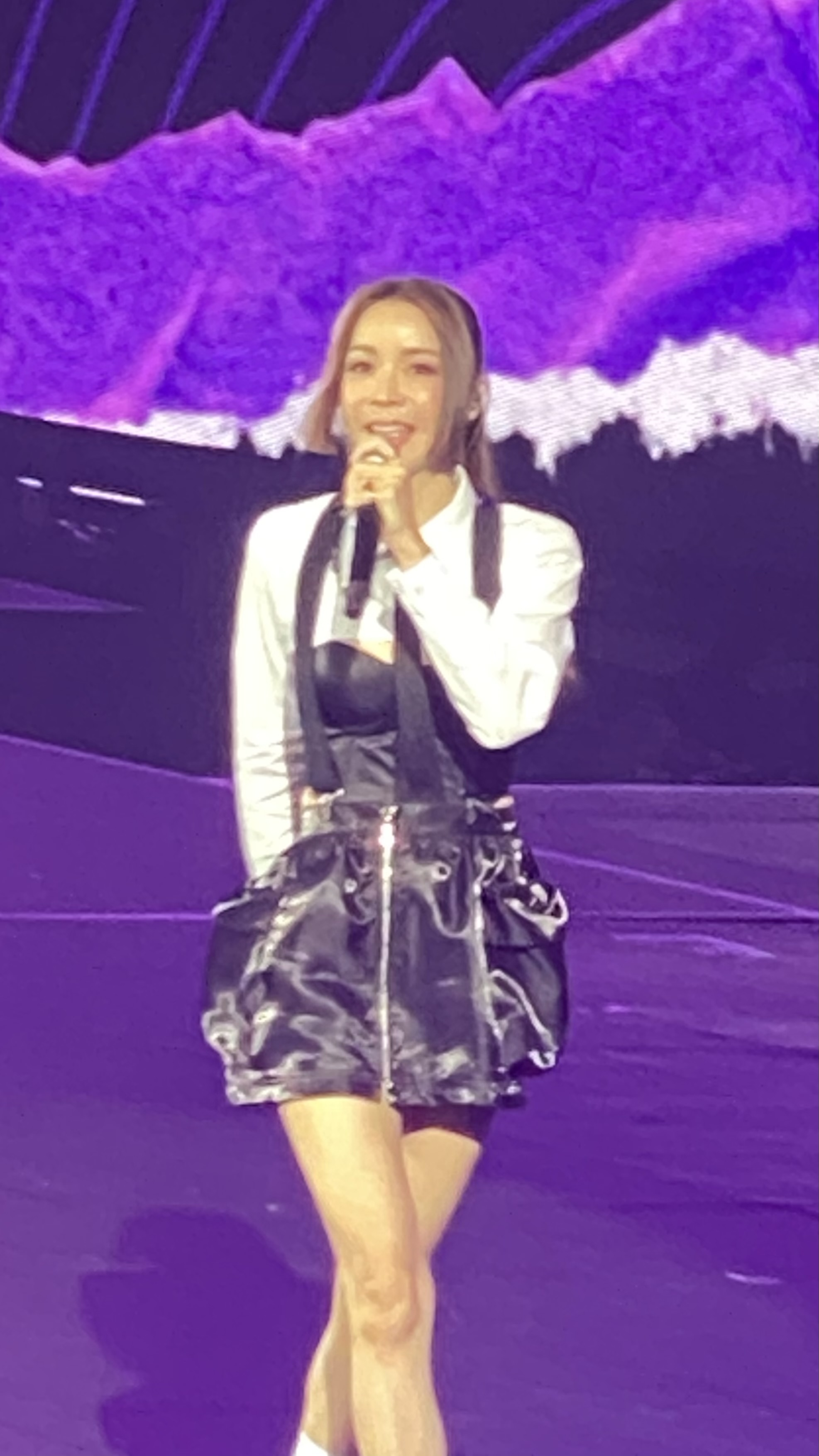
- Born: 15 March 1977 (age 49); Chiang Mai, Thailand
- Other names: Nook (นุก); Nook Suttida (นุก สุทธิดา); Ayeeshah Kasemsan na Ayudhya (อาอีซะห์ เกษมสันต์ ณ อยุธยา)
- Education: Bodindecha (Sing Singhaseni) School
- Occupations: Actress; model; singer; YouTuber
- Years active: 1992–present
- Agent: RS (1992–2000s)
- Known for: Pon in Romantic Blue (1995); Tangkwa in Kaw Morn Bai Nun Tee Tur Fun Yam Nun (1995)
- Spouses: Boonsit Thammarojpinit (m. 2004; div. 2009); Muhammad Hakim Bin Asaha (m. 2016)
- Children: 3
- Parents: Suttirat Kasemsan (father); Saengdao Kasemsan na Ayudhya (mother)

Suttida Kasemsan Na Ayutthaya or spelled Suttida Kasemsan na Ayudhya (Thai: สุทธิดา เกษมสันต์ ณ อยุธยา) (born March 15, 1977) also nicknamed Nook (นุก) is a Thai actress and singer who reached her peak in the 90s in the Thai entertainment industry.

== Biography and career ==
Originally from city of Chiang Mai in northern Thailand, Suttida grew up in Bangkok. Her father ACM Mom Luang Suttirat Kasemsan was a senior commissioned airman who was a classmate (Armed Forces Academies Preparatory School class 10) with Thaksin Shinawatra, the 23rd Thai Prime Minister and Gen Anupong Paochinda, former Commander-in-Chief of the Royal Thai Army and Minister of Interior. Her mother, Saengdao was a nurse. Suttida has only one younger brother.

She entered the showbiz in the early 90's became famous for featuring in the MV Bodyguard (บอดี้การ์ด) by Somchai Kemglad in 1992 (causing the two to become an imagined couple). In the meantime, she also starred in the folk drama Mong Pa (โม่งป่า) on Channel 7 and was one of the hosts of the TV program Na Ka (นะคะ) on Channel 3.

In 1994, she released her first studio album in teen pop genre titled Nook under RS Promotion, featuring hit songs such as Thon Sai Bua (ถอนสายบัว; "Curtsy"), Ban Ni Sunak Du (บ้านนี้สุนัขดุ; "Beware A Dog"), Rak Tur Mai Dai (รักเธอไม่ได้; "Can't Love You") etc.

In 1995, Suttida starred in Romantic Blue the most critically acclaimed and grossing film of the year.

== Personal life ==
She married a celebrity Boonsit Thammarojpinit in early 2004, the son of alleged gambling kingpin Paijit Thammarojpinit, also known as "Por Pratunam". The couple had two sons together before breaking up because she was physically attacked by her husband.

In 2016, she remarried to her Malaysian husband who was several years younger and converted to Islam according to him.

=== Politics ===
In addition, Suttida was also a member of the Neutral Democratic Party following her then husband Boonsit. During the party's election campaign speech at Sanam Luang in late 2007, she also acted as a spokesperson on stage.

== Selected filmography ==
Film

- Romantic Blue (1995)
- Extreme Game (1996)
- Friendship Breakdown (1999)
- 4 Romance (2008)
- The Unreasonable Man (2014)
- Ruk Na Soup Soup (2020)

Television dramas

- 2016 (ขมิ้นกับปูน) (Por Dee Kam/Ch.7) as Peeb Thammakun (ปีบ ธรรมคุณ)
- 2016 Raeng Chang (แรงชัง) (Prosperous Productions/Workpoint TV) as Lam-Doun (ลำดวน)
- 2016 Kularb Tud Petch (กุหลาบตัดเพชร) (Cholumpi Production/Ch.3) as Rodsarin (รสลิน)
- 2020 Korn Tawan Laeng (ก่อนตะวันแลง) (Papassara Production/Ch.7) as Raenu (เรณู โคนประคำ)
- 2022 Saai Bplay (สายเปล) (Papassara Production/Ch.7) as Matsee (มัทรี ศรีสุข / พลับพลึง ศรีสุข) with Panu Suwanno
- 2023 Soi Nakee (สร้อยนาคี) (Mung Mai/Ch.7) as Kanda (กานดา เรืองวงศา) with Arnus Rapanich

Television series

- Mong Pa (1992)
- Kaw Morn Bai Nun Tee Tur Fun Yam Nun (1995)
- Ko Sawat Hat Sawan (1996)
- 2016 Angel Destiny (อุบัติรักเทวา) (Nawalart Nimit/True4U) as (มยุริญ ตระการศักดิ์ (มายด์)) with Kornkan Sutthikoses
- Romantic Blue: The Series (2020)
- 2021 Nabi, My Step Darling (นาบี ฉันจะไม่รักเธอ) (GMMTV/GMM 25) as Waree Rattanatraithit (Wa) (Kawin's mother) (วารี รัตนไตรทิศ) with Oliver Pupart
- 2022 Club Friday Love Seasons Celebration Ep. Broken Anniversary (Club Friday The Series Love Seasons Celebration ตอน Broken Anniversary) (The ONE Enterprise Public-Change2561/One 31) as Dueandem (เดือนเต็ม) with Krissada Pornweroj

Television sitcom

- 20 ()

=== Music video appearances ===
Year	Title	Artist	Release date
1992	บอดี้การ์ด (Bodyguard)	Somchai Kemglad	

== Selected discography ==
=== Studio albums ===
- Nook (1994)
- Sweet Hot (1997)

== Master of Ceremony: MC ==
Year	Network	With
1993	Channel 3: Na Ka	

== Awards ==
- Suphannahong National Film Awards 1995 (Best Actress)
- Golden Doll Awards 1995 (Best Actress)
