= The Haunted Drum =

- Theatrical release poster
- Thai: เปิงมาง กลองผีหนังมนุษย์
- Directed by: Nuttapeera Shomsri; Sarunya Noithai
- Screenplay by: Nuttapeera Shomsri
- Produced by: Thawatchai Phanpakdee
- Starring: Kett Thantup; Woranut Wongsawan
- Distributed by: Phranakorn Film
- Release date: 19 April 2007 (Thailand)
- Running time: 102 minutes
- Country: Thailand
- Language: Thai
- Box office: 14.11 million ฿

The Haunted Drum (Thai: เปิงมาง กลองผีหนังมนุษย์, romanized: Perng Mang The Haunted Drum) is a 2007 Thai horror drama film directed by Nuttapeera Shomsri (ณัฐพีระ ชมศรี) and Sarunya Noithai (สรัญญา น้อยไทย).

== Plot ==
In 19th century Siam, Ping wishes to become a talented musician like his parents who once served as royal musicians. After his grandfather died, he asked Ping to release a woman spirit from her suffering. As an adult, he becomes a student of Master Duang, a famous master musician. Master Duang owned the mysterious drum called poeng mang, which is said to have been made by the skin of a beautiful woman named Thip. Ping falls in love with a beautiful girl who teaches him how to master drum skills but she is in fact the ghost living inside the drum. Meanwhile, an arrogant musician called Muan tries to convince all the students to leave Master Duang to join the band of a greedy provincial deputy. Some students die horribly. Even if Muan is defeated by Ping during a drum contest, things get worse and the drum becomes not only an instrument of music but also an instrument of death.

It is revealed that Thip offered herself as sacrifice to create the drum and has been acting as the guardian spirit of the drum ever since. After many students who join the Deputy side are killed by Thip, the Deputy orders the music school to be burned down. When the deputy tried to steal the sacred drum, he and his men are killed by Thip and he himself is dragged to hell by those that cursed by the drum for his sacrilege. Ping reads the letter from Master Duang, which turns out to the instruction of an incantation to free the spirit of Thip. After freeing Thip, Ping comes at the ruin of the school and encounter the rich patron of the school who helps him rebuilding the school. Decades later, Ping succeed Master Duang and the rebuilt academy. One day, during a performance, he sees the vision of Thip and dies, reuniting with her at last in the afterlife.

== Release ==
=== Home media ===
The Haunted Drum became available on Toku on 8 April 2017 and as VOD through Amazon Prime Video.

== See also ==
- List of Thai films
