= Ong-Art Singlumpong =

Thai film director

- องอาจ สิงห์ลำพอง
- Born: January 19, 1971 (age 55); Bangkok, Thailand
- Occupations: Film director; TV station director

Ong-Art Singlumpong (Thai: องอาจ สิงห์ลำพอง) is a Thai film director. Currently he is the executive director of Channel 8.

== Filmography ==
- Dreamers (Fan Tid Fai Huajai Tid Din) (1997)
- Friendship Breakdown (Taek 4 Rak Lop Krot Lew) (1999)
- The Sin (Choo) (2004)
