= Thai Thief =

- The Thai movie poster.
- Directed by: Pisut Praesangeam
- Written by: Suphachai Sittiaumponpan
- Starring: Sahatchai Chumrum; Sara Leigh; Amthida Ngoencharoen; Suthep Po-ngam; Todsaporn Rottakij
- Cinematography: Teerawat Rujintham
- Distributed by: RS Film
- Release date: 12 April 2006
- Running time: 105 minutes
- Country: Thailand
- Language: Thai

Thai Thief (Thai: ไทยถีบ, also known as Thai Theep) is a 2006 Thai action comedy film, directed by Pisut Praesangeam and starring Todsaporn Rottakij and Sahatchai "Stop" Chumrum. It was distributed by RS Film and released on 12 April 2006. The film is set during World War II in Thailand.

== Plot ==
In World War II, Japanese troops occupied Southeast Asia with the intention of making new colonies. Thailand was one country that allowed the Japanese troops to transport their weapons and gold via train. For Kom, a well-known Thai thief, this was the perfect opportunity to commit a crime. Meanwhile, Toe, the leader of an anti-Japan movement has a plan to stop the train, but the situation becomes more difficult when Kom and Toe are forced to help a secret agent from being captured by the troops.

== Cast ==
- Sahatchai "Stop" Chumrum as Laem 18 Uan
- Sara Leigh as Seena
- Amthida Ngoencharoen as Patty
- Suthep Po-ngam as Toe
- Todsaporn Rottakij as Kom
- Somlek Sakdikul as General Sant
- Than Thanakorn as Yai Thaareu
