= Yam Yasothon =

- The Thai theatrical poster.
- Directed by: Petchtai Wongkamlao
- Written by: Petchtai Wongkamlao
- Produced by: Prachya Pinkaew; Sukanya Vongsthapat; Sita Vosbein
- Starring: Petchtai Wongkamlao; Janet Khiew; Waew Jokmok; Chaipan Ninkong; Yaoluck Tumbhun
- Cinematography: Jiradech Samniangsanor
- Edited by: Boonchai Apintanaphong
- Music by: Origin Kampanee
- Distributed by: Sahamongkol Film International
- Release date: 8 September 2005
- Running time: 93 minutes
- Country: Thailand
- Language: Thai/Lao/Isan

Yam Yasothon (Thai: แหยม ยโสธร, English title: Hello Yasothon) is a 2005 Thai musical romantic comedy film, written, directed by, and starring Petchtai Wongkamlao.

== Plot ==
The story is set in 1967 in Yasothon Province, Thailand, where Yam is a hard-working, humble, and kind farmer—kind, that is, except when it comes to the attentions of Joei, the homely maid of Soy, who is the girlfriend of Yam's cousin, Tong. Yam nurses stray and injured animals of all kinds, but he never has nice things to say to Joei. Despite this, she persists in flirting with Yam and making unwanted physical advances. Meanwhile, Soy and Tong cuddle, kiss and hug each other at every opportunity.

Soy's aunt, the haughty village moneylender, Dok Toh, disapproves of Soy seeing Tong, whom Dok Toh believes is too low class for her niece. She orders Soy and Joei to stay away from Tong and Yam. The social-climbing Dok Toh additionally arranges for Soy to meet the handsome, yet dull, son of the local sheriff, who has a pair of slow-witted henchmen who will help enforce Dok Toh's orders that Joei and Soy never again see Yam and Tong.

However, on the night of a village temple fair, Tong and Soy and Yam and Joei sneak away and each couple finds a place to spend the night together. Tong and Soy stay up all night talking about their feelings for one another, while Joei takes sexual advantage of Yam.

Dok Toh finds out about Joei and Soy's misadventures and arranges to send them away to Bangkok. Soy will attend a trade school, learning English and secretarial skills while Joei will learn to be a seamstress and hairdresser. With the money earned while she is in Bangkok, Joei transforms herself by assembling a new wardrobe and undergoing beauty treatments, including having her skin lightened, a prominent mole removed, and her teeth straightened and whitened.

In Joei's absence, Yam begins to long for her, discovering that he cares for her after all. Both Soy and Joei write letters to their men, but they hear nothing in return. It turns out that Dok Toh has bribed the postman to deliver letters addressed to Yam and Tong to her, and she in turn dumps the letters into the river.

Joei and Soy determine that their letters aren't getting through, so they write to the abbot at the local Buddhist temple and ask him to deliver their letters to Yam and Tong.

Yam and Tong, meanwhile, strike out on their own and head for Bangkok to try to find the girls. Neither had ever been to the city before, and did not realize how big the capital was. Discouraged by their lack of success, they return home, but through the efforts of the monk, they finally hear from Soy and Joei.

The girls return to Yasothon for Songkran, and Soy is reunited with Tong. Yam is heartbroken when he does not see Joei on the bus. In fact she was on the bus, but because she had drastically changed her appearance, Yam did not recognize her, and showed no interest in Joei when she approached him.

The engagement of Soy and the sheriff's son is still on, though. Tong falls into despair, starts drinking and becomes a hopeless alcoholic. On the day of the engagement ceremony, Tong's father shows up with shotgun to disrupt the proceedings. He points out that Soy does not love the sheriff's son and he demands that Tong be allowed to marry Soy.

As for Yam, he comes around and sees that Joei is the same woman, even if she's changed on the outside.

== Cast ==
- Petchtai Wongkamlao as Yam
- Janet Khiew as Joei
- Waew Jokmok as Dok Toh
- Chaipan Ninkong as Tong
- Yaoluck Tumbhun as Soy

== Reception ==
Yam Yasothon was one of the biggest hits of the year at the Thai box office. Janet Khiew was nominated for best actress at the Thailand National Film Association Awards. The film predominantly used the Isan dialect and was subtitled in central Thai language.

== Sequels ==
- Yam Yasothon 2 (2008)
- Yam Yasothon 3 (2013)
