= Ped Chern-yim =

Thai comedian

- Born: Thanya Phowichit; June 8, 1954 (age 71); Trang Province, Thailand
- Other name: Ped Chernyim (เป็ด เชิญยิ้ม)
- Occupation: Thai actor
- Spouse: Kampu Patamasut

Thanya Phowichit, better known by the stage name Ped Chern-yim (born June 8, 1954 at Huai Yot District Trang Province) is a Thai comedian. He is best known as co-founder of famous comedian group Chern-yim which he also played, and once the president of National Comedy Association of Thailand. He was also Vice-Mannger of BEC-TERO.

Besides working in show business, he also served as football manager for Trang F.C. and Thailand women's national under-19 football team. He was also a member of central committee of Football Association of Thailand.

He graduated at Chandrakasem Rajabhat University Ramkhamhaeng University and PhD. in sports science from Kasetsart University in 2015

He is married to Kampu Patamasut daughter of director and actor Suprawat Patamasut.

== Film ==
- Swetter Red (1984)
- Rak Talomboon (1985)
- Ainu Phutorn (1985)
- Khorthankadthun (1987)
- Love bridge Sarasin (1987)
- Nang Kang Fai (1988)
- Panya Renu (2011)

== TV ==
- Gonbuay Klaikeat (1997 - 2015)
- Gonbuay Show (2015)
- Yutthakan Sathanyub (2015)
