= Pongsak Pongsuwan =

Thai actor and comedian (born 1966)

- พงศ์ศักดิ์ พงษ์สุวรรณ
- Born: April 7, 1966 (age 60); Sukhothai, Thailand
- Other names: Theng Therdtherng; Tu Chernyim
- Occupations: Actor; comedian
- Years active: 1996–present
- Spouse: Mala Pongsuwan
- Children: 4
- Parents: Direk Pongsuwan (father); Rampha Praebutra (mother)

Pongsak Pongsuwan (Thai: พงศ์ศักดิ์ พงษ์สุวรรณ; RTGS: Phongsak Phongsuwan; born April 7, 1966, in Sawankhalok District, Sukhothai Province) is a Thai comedian and actor. He is best known in Thailand by his stage name, Theng Therdtherng (Thai: เท่ง เถิดเทิง; RTGS: Theng Thoetthoeng). He has one sister named Pongphan Pongsuwan.

A popular comedian in Thai nightclubs and on television, Theng made his feature-film debut in Killer Tattoo, a 2001 action-comedy that was the directorial debut for Yuthlert Sippapak. He portrayed Elvis M 16, an amnesiac hitman-turned-Elvis impersonator, who is lured back to do one more job. The film starred several other Thai comics, including Petchtai Wongkamlao and Suthep Po-ngam, all in sometimes dramatic, action-filled roles.

In 2005, he starred in one of the year's biggest hits for the Thai film industry, Luang Phii Theng (The Holy Man), portraying a street hood who becomes a Buddhist monk. The comedy earned 141 million baht at the box office.

The television production house, Work Point, hoped to repeat that success in 2006 with Nong Teng Nakleng-pukaotong, which teamed Theng up with Choosak Eamsuk (better known as Nong Cha Cha Cha). Theng starred as a likay performer in 1923 Siam, who is faced with the prospect of losing his theater due to the advent of films. With his friend (Nong), Theng tries to derail production of the first Thai film, Miss Suwanna of Siam.

In addition to his film work, Pongsak regularly appears with Choosak and Petchtai Wongkamlao on the Ching Roi Ching Lan television variety series. His trademark gag is one in which he pokes himself in the eye.

In mid-2024, with the Summer Olympics in Paris underway, a photo of him shooting while his back was turned just by looking through the mirror in the Ching Roi Ching Lan went worldwide viral online. It was compared to a photo of Yusuf Dikeç, a Turkish shooter who won a silver medal at this Olympics. Some believed the photo was real, with Twitter's Community Notes feature posting a warning that it was not real.

== Filmography ==
- Killer Tattoo (2001)
- 7 Pra-Jan-Barn (Heaven's Seven) (2002)
- Spy Next Door (2003)
- Luang Phii Theng (The Holy Man) (2005)
- Nong Teng Nakleng-pukaotong (2006)
- Teng and Nong: The Movie (2007)
