= Suthep Po-ngam =

Thai actor and comedian (born 1950)

- สุเทพ โพธิ์งาม
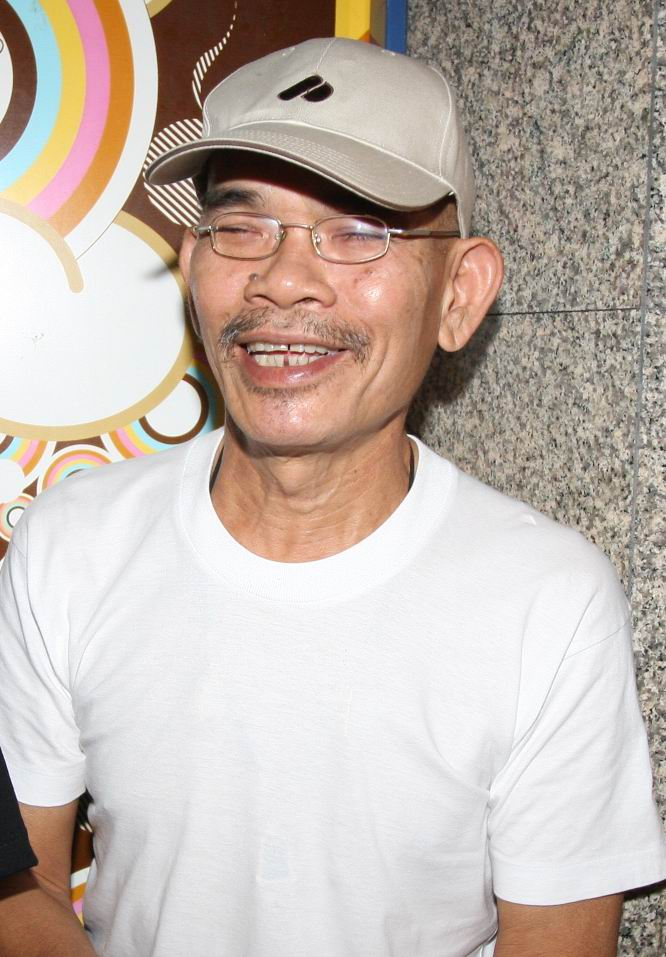
- Suthep Po-ngam at MTV Thailand's 6th anniversary party.
- Born: 25 October 1950 (age 75); Prachinburi province, Thailand
- Other names: Thep Po-ngam; Pa Thep (Dad Thep)
- Education: Ban Ya Ba School, Narathiwat
- Occupations: Actor; comedian; director; parody music singer
- Years active: 1969–present
- Spouse: Passarawan Songpeerapat (m. 1980)
- Children: Nichapa Po-ngam (daughter); Thanaphol Po-ngam (son)
- Relatives: Den Dokpradu; Der Doksadao; Noi Po-ngam (younger sister); Rhatha Phongam (niece)

Suthep Po-ngam (Thai: สุเทพ โพธิ์งาม, RTGS: Suthep Pho-ngam; born 25 October 1950) also known by his stage name Thep Po-ngam (Thai: เทพ โพธิ์งาม; RTGS: Thep Pho-ngam), is a Thai comedian, actor, film director and screenwriter. He played the leader of a gang of inept hitmen in Killer Tattoo. A popular comedian in Thailand, Thep at one time led a comedy troupe that included Petchtai Wongkamlao (Mum Jokmok), whom he co-starred with in Killer Tattoo.

== Biography ==
He was born on 25 October 1950 in Prachinburi province, with Phuan ancestry from his paternal and maternal grandfathers who were from the northeast, but to grow and live in Narathiwat province, later moving to Hat Yai District, Songkhla province.

He is famous for his comedic performances with Den Dokpradu and Der Doksadao in the name of "Den Der Thep" in the late 1970s.

Suthep is married to Passarawan Songpeerapat (Joom), they have two children. Later they separated in 2014. In 2016 both returned again Other roles have included the slayer of zombies in SARS Wars, an aged heavy metal rock star in Rock Not Die and an imposter doctor in Dumber Heroes. He performed the voice for the elderly mahout in the 2006 Thai animated feature, Khan Kluay.

On 3 November 2009, the Supreme Court of Justice of Thailand affirmed the judgments of the lower courts—the Central Bankruptcy Court and the Central Appeal Court—adjudging Suthep bankrupt and ordered his property to be under an absolute receivership. The judgment came after Suthep failed, for years, to pay in instalment for the 3,000,000-baht costs of five townhouses he purchased in Phatthaya. In its judgment, the Supreme Court remarked: "The property being owned by the defendant (Suthep) costs only 800,00 baht and, hence, cannot cover the debts claimed by the plaintiff (KT Bank). Citing to have 300,000-baht monthly income, the defendant refused to prove how much his monthly expenses are. Deeming the allegation of the defendant is indistinct, the Supreme Court of Justice, hereby, adjudges the defendant bankrupt and orders an absolute receivership as requested by the plaintiff."

== Filmography ==
- Killer Tattoo (2001)
- Rock Not Die (Pun rock nah yon) (2003)
- Duk dum dui (2003) (also director)
- The Groan (2004)
- Jao saao Pad Thai (Pad Thai Bride) (2004)
- SARS Wars (Khun krabii hiiroh) (2004)
- Dumber Heroes (2005)
- Thai Thief (2006)
- Khan Kluay (2006)
- Bus Lane (2007)
- Kapi (2010)
- The Rocket (2013)
- The Protect (Bodyguard Na Huk) (2019)

== MC ==
- 1994 : มาสเตอร์คีย์ (produced by TV Thunder) On Air Channel 3 MC with เมทนี บุรณศิริ, สุมินทร์ เลิศอมรวัฒนา (1996–2010)
- 1994 : กาลิเลโอเกม (produced by Star Vision) On Air Channel 9 MC with ช่อผกา วิริยานนท์, พิสิทธิ์ กิรติการกุล (1994–1997)
- 2005 : 3 ซ่า Cafe (produced by SEARCH Entertainment/SUCCESS ENTERTAINMENT) On Air Channel 3 MC with จาตุรงค์ มกจ๊ก, จิ้ม ชวนชื่น (2002–2006)
- 2016 : ชุมทางดาวทอง (produced by 7 Star Studio) On Air Channel 7 (2016-)

== Music video ==
- Khon Chai Chiwit (2000): Thanapol Intharit
- Ta Sawang (2004): Modern Dog

== Talk Show ==
"Show Pa Pud Ja Pasa Thep" 18 October 2009 with major assist from Ton Enterprises pty ltd Australia to make the show possible. Suthep give Ton Triphet Rookachat a special thank on stage.
