= Somlek Sakdikul =

Thai film actor and musician (born 1953)

Somlek Sakdikul (Thai: สมเล็ก ศักดิกุล, RTGS: Somlek Sakdikun; born 10 November 1953) is a Thai film actor and musician. He is sometimes credited as Somchai Sakdikul. He portrayed "Suwat" or "Daddy", the lecherous music producer in Pen-Ek Ratanaruang's 2001 comedy, Monrak Transistor. A prolific actor, he appears in several Thai films each year.

He also works as a tennis commentator for United Broadcasting Corporation, a cable television in Thailand.

== Partial filmography ==
- Monrak Transistor (2001)
- Mekhong Full Moon Party (2002)
- Buppah Rahtree (2003)
- Hom rong (The Overture) (2004)
- Sai Lor Fah (Pattaya Maniac) (2004)
- SARS Wars (2004)
- Jaew (M.A.I.D.) (2004)
- Pad Thai Bride (2004)
- Buppah Rahtree 2: Rahtree Returns (2005)
- Promise Me Not (2005)
- Rohng Tiam (Happy Inn) (2005)
- Luang Phii Theng (The Holy Man) (2005)
- In the Name of the Tiger (Seua phuu khaao) (2005)
- Ghost Variety (Variety phii chalui) (2005)
- Nam Prig Lhong Rua (Navy Boys) (2006)
- Thai Thief (2006)
