= Killer Tattoo =

2001 film by Yuthlert Sippapak

- The Thai film poster.
- Directed by: Yuthlert Sippapak
- Written by: Yuthlert Sippapak
- Produced by: Rashane Limtrakul; Sataporn Panichraksapong; Kriangkai Chetchotisak; Surachai Chetchotisak
- Starring: Suthep Po-ngam; Somchai Kemglad; Sornsutha Klunmalee; Petchtai Wongkamlao; Pongsak Pongsuwan
- Cinematography: Sutuch Intranupakorn
- Edited by: Mahasuk Tassanapuk
- Distributed by: RS Film
- Release date: 5 April 2001
- Running time: 114 minutes
- Country: Thailand
- Language: Thai

Killer Tattoo (Thai: มือปืน/โลก/พระ/จัน Mue Puen/Lok/Phra/Chan) is a 2001 Thai action comedy film written and directed by Yuthlert Sippapak. It was the debut film by Yuthlert, and also was the feature-film debut for popular Thai comedians Petchtai Wongkamlao and Pongsak Pongsuwan (playing an assassin who thinks he's Elvis Presley).

== Plot ==
The scene is set sometime in the near future, after some type of apocalypse or war, and Thailand has been taken over by the United States.

Just released from prison, aging assassin Bae Buffgun is offered a job – killing Bangkok's police chief. Buffgun forms a team of killers, comprising his old partner, Ghost Rifle and two newcomers, Dog Badbomb, a short-tempered explosives expert and Elvis M-16, who's suffered some of trauma that makes him think he's Elvis Presley.

Meanwhile, Thailand's most deadly assassin, Kit Silencer has also been hired to kill the top cop. Confusion ensues, and even though the chief is killed, the crime lord who hired the killers wants them all dead anyway.

All the hitmen have issues:

- Buffgun is guilt-ridden over abandoning his daughter years earlier.
- Ghost Rifle is haunted by the accidental shooting of his beautiful wife.
- Dog harbours a secret reason for his allegiance to Elvis.
- Elvis really believes he is Elvis Presley (and not an Elvis impersonator), and because the real Elvis didn't speak Thai, Elvis M-16 is incapable of understanding the language and can only respond to English commands. But none of the other hitmen speak English.
- Kit Silencer is driven by avenging the deaths of his parents, who were killed by a man with a trident tattoo on the inside of his right wrist. He checks everyone he kills or comes into contact with for that tattoo. Buffgun happens to be wearing a bandage over the exact spot on his wrist where a tattoo might be, so Kit suspects the older gunman.

== Cast ==
- Suthep Po-ngam as Pae Buffgun
- Somchai Kemglad as Kit Silencer
- Sornsutha Klunmalee as Ghost Rifle
- Petchtai Wongkamlao as Dog Badbomb
- Pongsak Pongsuwan as Elvis M 16

== Film festivals ==
- 2002 Seattle International Film Festival
- 2002 Moscow Film Festival
- 2002 Tokyo International Fantastic Film Festival
- 2002 Stockholm International Film Festival
- 2003 New York Asian Film Festival
