= Mum Jokmok =

Thai actor, comedian and film director (born 1965)

Petchtai Wongkamlao
- เพ็ชรทาย วงษ์คำเหลา
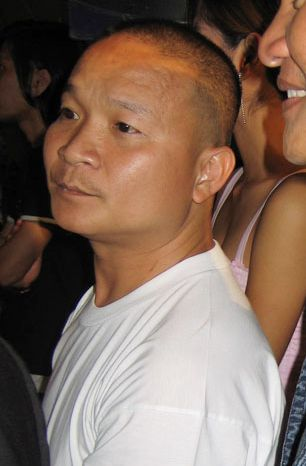
- Petchtai at press screening of Tom-Yum-Goong in 2005
- Born: June 24, 1965 (age 61); Ubon Ratchathani (now Yasothon), Thailand
- Other name: Mum Jokmok (หม่ำ จ๊กมก)
- Occupations: Actor; comedian; martial artist; film director
- Years active: 1990–present
- Spouse: Endoo Wongkamlao

Petchtai Wongkamlao (Thai: เพ็ชรทาย วงษ์คำเหลา, RTGS: Phetthai Wongkhamlao, IPA: [pʰét.tʰāːj wōŋ.kʰām.lǎw]; born 24 June 1965) is a Thai comedian, actor, martial artist and film director. He is best known in Thailand by his stage name, Mum Jokmok (Thai: หม่ำ จ๊กมก, RTGS: Mam Chokmok, [màm tɕók.mók]), and is a popular Thai television personality. He is credited as Mom Jok Mok, Mum Jokemok, or Mom Jokmok.

== Comedy and television ==
Mum started his career as a comedian in the Bangkok "cafe" scene (restaurants in Thailand with live music and comedy performances). He began his comedy troupe with "Jaturong Mokjok." Mum became widely known to the public from the variety game show Ching Roi Ching Lan (ชิงร้อยชิงล้าน) hosted by Panya Nirankul. He appeared in the comedy section with his group members and performed stunts. He also co-hosted another popular game show, Wethithong (เวทีทอง), with Kiat Kitcharoen. He also has his TV show Mum Show, which airs every Saturday night.

== Film roles ==
Mum is perhaps best known for his film role as George (in English) or "Dirty Balls," a translation of the Isan language term "Buk Hum Lare" (บักหำแหล่), the comic-relief character in Ong-Bak, a popular action film starring Tony Jaa.

Mum reprised the comic-relief role in the follow-up to Ong-Bak, Tom-Yum-Goong. Instead of a con artist, as in Ong-Bak, he is a Sydney police inspector. Much of the comedy in Tom-Yum-Goong was about Mum speaking English, which is his third language (after Issan Lao and Thai). A gag reel over the closing credits shows him struggling with many lines.

His first starring role was in 2001's Killer Tattoo, director Yuthlert Sippapak's debut film. The film is about a group of bumbling hitmen, and his character is called Dog Badbomb.

After the success of Ong-Bak, Mum was able to write, direct and star in his own film, The Bodyguard, a wire fu action comedy in which he portrays a bodyguard fired after the billionaire he is protecting is killed. Martial arts action was choreographed by Panna Ritikrai, and Ong-Bak's Tony Jaa plays a small part as a fighter in a supermarket. One of the most famous scenes is when Mum's character runs naked across Bangkok's crowded Victory Monument public square, a major junction for public transportation. In the "Making of" documentary on the film's DVD, Mum said the scene was one of the most embarrassing things he has ever done.

Mum wrote, directed, and starred in 2005's Yam Yasothon (Hello Yasothon), in which he returned to his roots as a nightclub comedian for a musical romantic comedy set in rural northeastern Thailand in 1967. It was an homage to the Thai musical comedies of the 1960s and '70s, especially the Mitr Chaibancha and Petchara Chaowarat films. The dialogue was entirely in the Isan Lao dialect, and for screenings in Bangkok, it had Thai subtitles so that central Thais could understand it more easily. In the Thailand National Film Awards, Yam Yasothon received a best-actress nomination for Mum's co-star, Janet Kheaw.

Mum also has shown a flair for dramatic acting. In 2005, he starred in Midnight My Love (Cherm) as a loner taxi driver who has a relationship with a massage parlor girl. Cherm was screened at the 10th Pusan International Film Festival and other festivals. Mum was nominated for best actor at the 2005 Thailand National Film Awards. His co-star, Woranut Wongsawan, was nominated for best actress.

He is often seen in more minor roles, including the hit 2005 Thai comedy The Holy Man (Luang Phii Theng) and an uncredited role in Dumber Heroes, a part he says he did for "a case of beer."

Mum has written a short autobiography, The Untold Story (ISBN 974-91946-9-1).

At the end of 2005, Mum starred in Ghost Variety (Pee Chalui), a comedy-horror story in which he plays the director of a reality TV series that searches for spirits in haunted places. The film was released on December 29, 2005. It was directed by Adirek "Uncle" Wattaleela, a veteran producer and director, and it featured guest appearances from many Thai film directors and producers, including Somsak Techaratanaprasert, Prachya Pinkaew, Piak Poster, Cherd Songsri, Yuthlert Sippapak.

Along with his film work, he continues to be a regular part of the cast of the BBTV Channel 7 variety-game show Ching-Roi-Ching-Lan, working with fellow comedians Pongsak Pongsuwan and Choosak Eamsuk.

Among Mum's movies during 2006-07 is The Bodyguard 2. The movie is a prequel that tells the story of his character Khumlao and how he came from the fictional country of Nongwaileum to work in an undercover police assignment in Thailand. His character posed as a luk thung singer named Mummy Lao, so in addition to action and comedy, the film features singing and dancing. Mum was also featured in another movie in 2007 called Kuu Raet (The Odd Couple), where he played the role of a ladyboy.

== Filmography ==
=== As actor ===
- Joui (จุ๊ย) (1990)
- Song Tone (สองโทน) (1991)
- Kabuan Karn Ajarn Koi (ขบวนการอาจารย์โกย) (1991)
- Pob Phee Tha Leng Kling Ngab Ngab (ปอบผีทะเล้น ตอน กลิ้ง..งาบ..งาบ) (1991)
- Tanong Ra Hum Satarn Lok (ทะนง (ระห่ำสะท้านโลก) (1991)
- Pun Mae Bia (พันธุ์แม่เบี้ย) (1991)
- Bann Pee Sing (บ้านผีสิง) (1991)
- Kahang (กะหัง) ( (1991)
- Sook Sarn Phee Pob (ซี้แบบผีผี) ( (1991)
- Chee Babb Phee Phee (สุสานผีปอบ) (1991)
- Pob Thaloo Daek (ปอบทะลุแดด) (1991)
- Rong Rien Kum Jab Pob (โรงเรียนกำจัดปอบ) (1992)
- Pook Phee Ma Ji Pob (ปลุกผีมาจี้ปอบ) (1992)
- Sunya Jai Mae Nak Pra Kha Nong (สัญญาใจ แม่นาคพระโขนง) (1992)
- Mae Nak Je Phee Pob (แม่นาคเจอผีปอบ) (1992)
- Chem Chem Laew Kor Chum (เฉิ่มเฉิ่มแล้วก็ฉ่ำ) (1992)
- Sayong Koys (สยองก๋อยส์) (1992)
- Ai Khae (ไอ้เข้) (1992)
- Rang Ruk Paya Bad (แรงรักพยาบาท) (1992)
- A Mai Thae Ya Si Ja (อ๊ะ.. ไม่เท่อย่าจิ๊จ๊ะ) (1992)
- Ja Koo Ruk Kod Nong Hai Kong Lok (จะกู่รักกอดน้องให้ก้องโลก) (1992)
- Kuan Oy (กวนโอ๊ย) (1993)
- Kong Roi 501 Rim Daeng (กองร้อย 501 ริมแดง) (1993)
- Koo Hoo Koo Ha (คู่หูคู่ฮา) (1993)
- Phee Mae Mai 3 (ผีแม่ม่าย 3) (1993)
- Sob 5 Pee (ศพ 5 ปี) (1993)
- Sati Mai Term Satang (สตึไม่เต็มสตังค์) (1993)
- Taharn Kern Bann Chum (ทหารเกณฑ์บานฉ่ำ) (1993)
- Wing Na Tung Kum Lang 2 bon sen Tang maha Sajung (วิ่งหน้าตั้งกำลัง 2 บนเส้นทางมหัศจรรย์) (1993)
- Kwam Ruk Kong Khun Chui 2 Panya Chon Kon Ka Ling (ความรักของคุณฉุย ภาค 2 ปัญญาชนคนกะลิง) (1993)
- Ter Kong Rao Kong Kao Ruer Kong Krai (เธอของเรา ของเขา หรือของใคร) (1993)
- Sood Warn Waeo Taeo Rerk (สูตรหวานแหววแถวแรก) (1993)
- Mong Pleng Lum Nam Phong (มนต์เพลงลำน้ำพอง) (1993)
- Dracula Kub Pob (แดร็กคูล่ากับปอบ) (1993)
- Paya Mae Bia (พญาแม่เบี้ย) (1993)
- Jorakhae Phee Sing (จรเข้ผีสิง) (1993)
- Sayong Kins (สยองกึ๋นส์) (1993)
- Cha Wap Ap Ping (ชะแว้บแอบปิ๊ง) (1993)
- Pa Lok Pleng Luk Thung (ผ่าโลกเพลงลูกทุ่ง) (1993)
- Ban Phee Pob Part 11 (บ้านผีปอบ ภาค 11 - The Revenge of Pob Part 11: Yhib vs. Grandma Thongkum) (1994)
- Phee Mai Klua Sab Pa Re (ผีไม่กลัวสัปเหร่อ) (1994)
- Ka Chue Ma Hing Sa (ข้าชื่อมหิงสา) (1994)
- Isao Uuk Sarm Sok (อีสาวอก 3 ศอก) (1994)
- Ma Term Fun Wun Ta Tai (มาเติมฝันวันท้าทาย) (1994)
- Ban Phee Pob Part 13 (The Revenge of Pob Part 13) (บ้านผีปอบ ภาค 13) (1994)
- Kon Dark Diew (คนแดดเดียว) (1995)
- Kong Roi 501 Tung Jai Ja Tak Tae Mai Tak Tao (กองร้อย 501 ถึงใจจะแตก แต่ไม่แตกแถว) (1995)
- Muer Phee (มือผี) (1995)
- Pee Sard Hang Kwam Ruk (ปีศาจแห่งความรัก) (1997)
- Killer Tattoo (มือปืน/โลก/พระ/จัน) (2001)
- Ong-Bak (องค์บาก) (2003)
- Sai Lor Fah (สายล่อฟ้า - Pattaya Maniac) (2003)
- The Bodyguard (2004)
- Midnight, My Love (Cherm) (2005)
- The Holy Man (Luang Phii Theng) (2005)(cameo)
- Dumber Heroes (2005) (cameo)
- Tom-Yum-Goong (The Protector) (2005)
- Yam Yasothon (Hello Yasothon) (2005)
- Ghost Variety (Chalui 4: Pee Chalui) (2005)
- Chai Lai (Dangerous Flowers) (2006)
- Krasue Valentine (Ghost of Valentine) (2006) (in film clip from The Bodyguard)
- Nong Teng Nakleng-pukaotong (2006) (cameo)
- The Bodyguard 2 (2007)
- Teng Nong Khon Ma Ha Hea (2007)
- The Odd Couple (2007)
- Konbai: The Movie (2007)
- Mum Deaw Hua Liem Hua Lam (2008)
- Ong Bak 2 (2008) (Cameo)
- Ong Bak 3 (2010)
- Panya Raenu (2011)
- The Kick (2011)
- The Outrage (2011)
- Sub Khu ku Lok (2012)
- Panya Raenu 2 (2012)
- Tom-Yum-Goong 2 (The Protector 2) (2013)
- Love Slave (2014)
- Ar Ma (2016)
- E-San Love Story (2017)
- The Last Heroes (2018)
- It Could Be Him (2019)
- Som Pla Noi (2021)
- Daeng Phra Khong (2022)
- The Murderer (2023)

=== As actor/director ===
- The Bodyguard (2004)
- Yam Yasothon (Hello Yasothon) (2005)
- The Bodyguard 2 (2007)
- Yam Yasothon 2 (Hello Yasothon 2) (2008)
- Wongkamlao (2009)
- Yam Yasothon 3 (Hello Yasothon 3) (2013)

=== As voice actor ===
- Nak (2008)
