= Pisut Praesangeam =

Thai actor, film director, film producer and screenwriter

Pisut Praesangeam (Thai: พิสุทธิ์ แพร่แสงเอี่ยม, RTGS: Phisut Phraesaeng-iam, also Pisuth Praesaeng-Iam) is a Thai actor, film director, film producer and screenwriter. His films include Bangkok Haunted and Thai Thief.

== Filmography ==
=== As director ===
- Bangkok Haunted (2001)
- Thai Thief (2006)

=== As screenwriter ===
- Koo tae song loke (No Surrender, No Matter What) (1994)
- Bangkok Haunted (2001)

=== As producer ===
- Bangkok Haunted (2001)

=== As actor ===
- 999-9999 (2002)
