= Teng Nong kon maha hia =

Teng Nong kon maha hia (Teng and Nong: The Movie)
- Thai film poster.
- Directed by: Pongsak Pongsuwan; Choosak Iamsook
- Starring: Pongsak Pongsuwan; Choosak Iamsook
- Distributed by: Sahamongkol Film International
- Release date: May 31, 2007
- Country: Thailand
- Language: Thai

Teng Nong khon maha hia (Thai: เท่งโหน่ง คนมาหาเฮีย or Teng and Nong: The Movie) is a 2007 Thai comedy film directed by and starring Thai television comedians Pongsak Pongsuwan and Choosak Iamsook.

On its release, despite negative reviews by film critics, the film was No. 1 at Thailand cinema box offices, topping such Hollywood films as Shrek the Third, Ocean's Thirteen and another Thai film, Ploy.

== Plot ==
Bumbling parking valets Nong (Choosak Iamsuk) and Teng (Pongsak Pongsuwan) are assigned by their gangster boss (Phairoj Jaising) to deliver a valuable Chinese statuette to another gangster boss Hia See (Andy Khemphimook). During the journey, they decide to take a side trip and what should have been a simple job turns into a major fiasco with a police chase led by Lt Namtarn (Jirada Yohara).
