= Poj Arnon =

Thai film director

- พชร์ อานนท์
- Born: Arnon Mingkwunta; December 31, 1966 (age 59); Bangkok, Thailand
- Occupations: Film director; screenwriter
- Years active: 1992–present

Poj Arnon (Thai: พชร์ อานนท์; formerly spelled: พจน์ อานนท์, RTGS: Phot Anon) is a Thai film director. He is best known for his 2007 film Bangkok Love Story, that won him the Grand Prize (International Competition) at the Brussels International Independent Film Festival.

== Biography ==
=== Early life ===
Poj was born in December 31, 1966 in Bangkok. He came from a poor background, growing up in slums before moving to Samut Prakan province. He needed to work a lot of jobs in his childhood to make ends meet for his family.

=== Career ===
Poj began his career in the 1980s as an advertising sales manager for Ter-Kab-Chan Magazine, eventually becoming the magazine's chief editor. His work on the magazine enabled him to scout out and groom many of the Thai teen movie stars of the era.

He started working in the Thai film industry in 1992, working as an assistant director on Sa-Daew-Haew by Five Star Production. He made his directorial debut in 1995 with Crazy, which was about a character from a Chinese martial arts television series who finds himself in the real world of modern-day Thailand. Next was Bullet Teen (1998), a drama about four troubled urban youths. Go-Six, his 2000 romantic drama about a love triangle involving a young man and two women was scandalous at the time because of the ambiguous sexuality of one of the women characters. Poj returned to the scene in 2003 with Cheerleader Queens, about a group of teenage Thai transvestites, or kathoey, who become high school cheerleaders.

In 2004, he shifted to RS Film, again tackling kathoeys with the crime comedy Spicy Beauty Queen of Bangkok, starring Winai Kraibutr as the leader of a gang of transvestite bank robbers.

He next moved to Sahamongkol Film International to direct the childhood drama Beautiful Wonderful Perfect, about a girl who befriends a boy with Down syndrome. Also entitled Er rer, the film was critically acclaimed in Thailand and was screened at overseas film festivals. His followup was an action comedy, Chai Lai, about five female crimefighters.

Poj was back with Five Star Production in 2007 for Haunting Me, a comedy horror film about three aging kathoeys battling ghosts in their apartment building. Since 2007 he has directed more than ten additional movies.

== Awards ==
- In 2007, Poj Arnon won the Grand Prize in the International Competition at the Brussels International Independent Film Festival for his film Bangkok Love Story.
- In 2008, he won the Best Screenplay prize for his film Bangkok Love Story at the Thailand National Film Association Awards.

== Filmography ==
=== Director ===
- 1995: Crazy
- 1998: Bullet Teen
- 2000: Go-Six
- 2003: Cheerleader Queens
- 2004: Spicy Beauty Queen of Bangkok (Plon naya)
- 2005: Beautiful Wonderful Perfect (Er rer)
- 2006: Chai Lai (Dangerous Flowers)
- 2007: Haunting Me (Hortaewtaek)
- 2007: Bangkok Love Story
- 2007: The Three Cripples
- 2009: Sassy Player
- 2010: Sorry Saranghaeyo
- 2011: Small Ru Gu Naew
- 2013: Make Me Shudder
- 2014: Make Me Shudder 2: Shudder Mae Nak
- 2014: Dangerous Boys
- 2015: Make Me Shudder 3
- 2015: Iron Ladies Roar
- 2015: There's Something About Tott (Love Heaw Feaw Tott)
- 2016: Joking Jazz 4G
- 2016: The Fast And Furious 888
- 2017: Zombie Fighters (Kud Krachak Krien)
- 2018: Toot Too Ku Chart (The Last Heroes)
- 2018: Joking Jazz 5G
- 2020: Pojaman Sawang Ka Ta
- 2021: Hor Taew Tak 8
- 2022: Tell the World I Love You
- 2026: The Monkey Hero

=== Producer ===
- 2010: The Intruder

=== Writer ===
- 2007: Bangkok Love Story
- 2007: The Three Cripples
- 2009: Sassy Player
- 2010: The Intruder
