= Yuthlert Sippapak =

Thai film director, screenwriter and producer

- ยุทธเลิศ สิปปภาค
- Born: November 8, 1966 (age 59); Loei, Thailand
- Occupations: Film director; screenwriter; producer
- Notable work: Killer Tattoo; Buppah Rahtree
- Website: Mahaganfilms.com

Yuthlert Sippapak (Thai: ยุทธเลิศ สิปปภาค, born November 8, 1966) is a Thai film director, screenwriter, and producer. He is best known for his genre-blending films Killer Tattoo (comedy and action) and Buppah Rahtree (comedy and horror).

== Biography ==
Yuthlert Sippapak was born on November 8, 1966, in Loei, Thailand. He graduated from Silpakorn University, with a bachelor's degree in interior design. He then went to study at The Art Student League of New York and learned to be a filmmaker by reading books in Barnes & Noble bookstore. Sippapak returned to Thailand in the 1990s to develop his film career.

He began his film career screenwriting for O-Negative (Roothum 1998) before transitioning to directing. His directorial debut was the 2001 film Killer Tattoo, a low-budget independent production that was initially overlooked by mainstream audiences and critics.

Sippapak is known for his distinctive style, which often features exaggerated action sequences, dark humour, and horror elements. His 2007 film Ghost Station, a comedy about a pair of gay men, appears to parody Brokeback Mountain.

His 2011 action-comedy Friday Killer (Thai: Meu Puen Dao Prasook) won the Jury Prize and the award for Best Cinematography at the 2011 Shanghai International Film Festival. It is the first part of hitman trilogy Meu Puen 3 Pak, followed by Saturday Killer (Thai: Meu Puen Dao Prasao) and Sunday Killer (Thai: Meu Puen Pra-athit).

In addition to his work in film, Sippapak also served as a judge in season 7 of the reality TV show Thailand's Got Talent.

== Filmography ==
- Killer Tattoo (2001)
- February (Khumphaphan) (2003)
- Buppah Rahtree (Rahtree: Flower of the Night) (2003)
- Sai Lor Fah (Pattaya Maniac) (2004)
- Buppah Rahtree Phase 2: Rahtree Returns (2005)
- Krasue Valentine (Ghost Valentine) (2006)
- Ghost Station (2007)
- The Last Moment (2008)
- Kill Tim (2008)
- Rahtree Reborn (2009)
- Sam Yan (2009)
- Saturday Killer (Meu Puen Dao Prasao) (2010)
- Friday Killer (Meu Puen Dao Prasook) (2011)
- Sunday Killer (Thai: Meu Puen Pra-athit) (
- Heaven and Hell (2012)
- Fatherland (2012)
- Chiang Khan Story (2014)
- Haunting in Japan (2016)
- Jazz the Dog (2017)
