= The Last Shot (2025 film) =

2025 Thai film by Phuttipong Nakthong

- Theatrical release poster
- Thai: มือปืน
- Directed by: Phuttipong Nakthong
- Written by: Phuttipong Nakthong; Rattanapon Pakprieo
- Produced by: Warunee Kasitkitsakulpol
- Starring: Somphol Rungpanich; Patara Eksangkul; Auttakorn Boonpeng; Sarika Sartsilpsupa; Arun Pawilai; Chatchai Plengpanich; Benjamin Joseph Varney
- Cinematography: Kritsadapol Samanukul
- Edited by: Dog Back Dee
- Music by: Vanilla Sky Studio
- Production company: Kum-Kub-Nang
- Distributed by: Plan B Media; M Studio
- Release date: 27 November 2025
- Running time: 113 minutes
- Country: Thailand
- Language: Thai
- Box office: ฿10.91 million (Bangkok, Metropolitan & Chiang Mai) ฿25.7 million (nationwide)

The Last Shot (Thai: มือปืน, RTGS: Mue Puen; lit. 'Hitman') is a 2025 Thai action thriller crime film directed and co-written by Phuttipong Nakthong. It stars Somphol Rungphanit, Patara Eksangkul, Auttakorn Boonpeng, and Chatchai Plengpanich. Produced by Kum-Kub-Nang and distributed by M Studio, a subsidiary of Major Cineplex, together with Plan B Media, the film was theatrically released in Thailand on 27 November 2025. The film grossed ฿25.7 million nationwide during its theatrical run.

== Premise ==
In 1999, contract killers Petch and Bom are hired to assassinate a village headman in Phetchaburi province. They are accompanied by Samli, a young boy Petch raised who works as their assistant. While operating across the country, Petch unexpectedly encounters his former girlfriend, Sai. The two had previously planned to marry in 1994, but their wedding was ruined when a shootout broke out during the ceremony. Although Petch wants to leave the criminal underworld, he finds himself unable to escape his past.

== Cast ==
- Somphol Rungphanit as Petch
- Patara Eksangkul as Bom
- Auttakorn Boonpeng as Samli
- Sarika Sartsilpsupa as Sai
- Chatchai Plengpanich as Somjit
- Arun Pawilai as Tor
- Benjamin Joseph Varney as Ton
- Jirawat Vachirasaranpat as Piak
- Suchat Chaneed as Thawatchai
- Arunpong Naraphan as Tua
- Yasaka Chaisorn as a boat captain
- Peerapon Thearcharoen as Mee
- Arak Amornsupasiri as Wedding guest (cameo)
- Todsapol Maisuk as Wedding guest (cameo)
- Bhumibhat Thavornsiri as Wedding waiter (cameo)
- Pawarith Monkolpisit as Wedding crasher (cameo)

== Production ==
The Last Shot is Phuttipong Nakthong's fourth feature film, following 4 Kings (2021), 4 Kings II (2023), and In Youth We Trust (2024). He developed the project to move away from his previous focus on juvenile delinquency stories. The project was co-produced by M Studio and Plan B Media. A traditional blessing ceremony was held at Wat Intharam Worawihan on 12 April 2025 before filming began.

Phuttipong wrote the screenplay after interviewing and living with a former contract killer in Phetchaburi Province for two days. He focused the script on the realistic, daily routines and psychological strain of real-life outlaws rather than glorifying violence. The production design used a realistic late-1990s aesthetic and natural makeup styling. The film features several actors who previously appeared in the 4 Kings franchise, portraying older characters moving from student rivalries into adult crime.

== Release ==
The film opened in Thai theaters on 27 November 2025 as a major fourth-quarter release for M Studio. Following its theatrical run, the film was released internationally on Netflix. It was also screened internationally at the Far East Film Festival.

== Reception ==
The film received generally positive reviews from Thai critics, with the acting of the ensemble cast highlighted as its strongest element. Reviewers noted that Somphol Rungphanit gave a restrained dramatic performance, and praised Arun Pawilai's supporting role, alongside work from Chatchai Plengpanich and Sarika Sartsilpsupa. While the action choreography, music, and period details were well received, some critics argued that the screenplay was formulaic and had pacing issues compared to the director's earlier work.
