= Namo Tongkumnerd =

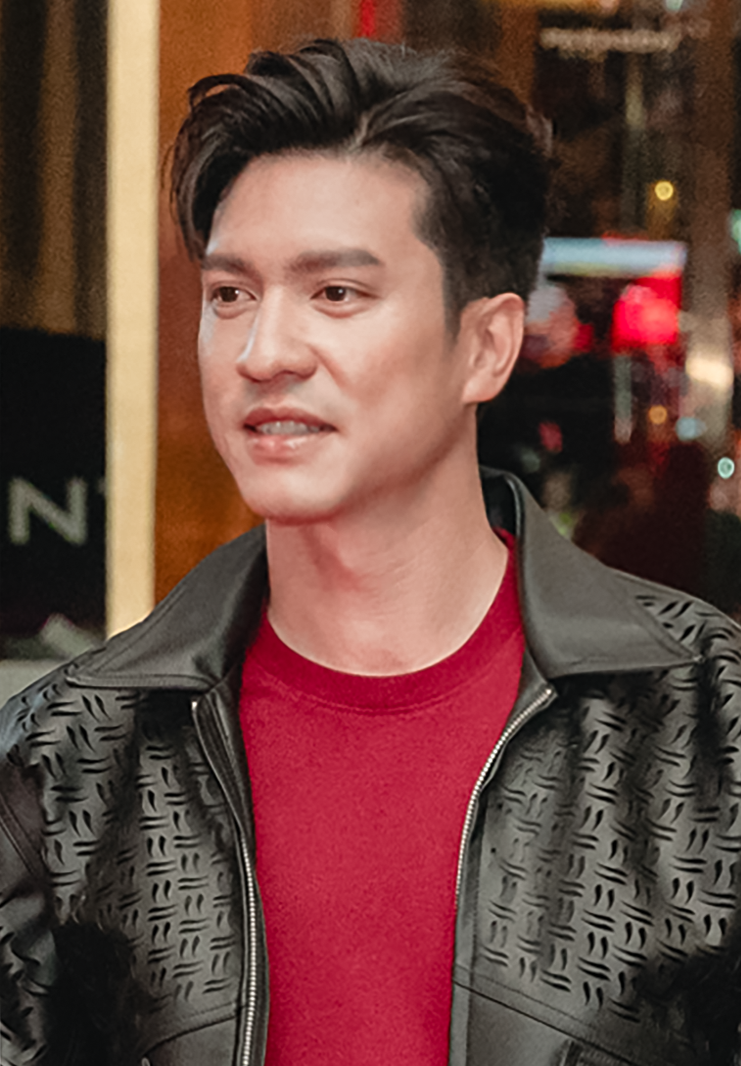
- Namo Tongkumnerd in 2025
- Born: Thongpao Tongkumnerd; 2 January 1987 (age 39); Chumphon, Thailand
- Other name: Namo
- Citizenship: Thai
- Education: Vajiravudh College; Rangsit University
- Occupations: Actor; filmmaker; model
- Years active: 2005–present
- Notable work: Art of the Devil Trilogy (2004–2008)

Thongpao Tongkumnerd (Thai: ทองเปาด์ ทองกำเหนิด, born 2 January 1987) also widely known by his stage name Namo Tongkumnerd (Thai: นะโม ทองกำเนิด) is a Thai actor and director. He is known for starring in numerous horror-thriller movies and TV series.

== Early life ==
Tongkumnerd was born in Chumphon in the south of Thailand.He entered the entertainment industry in 2005, starting as a model for youth magazines and appearing in TV commercials. He later signed with Five Star Production, which launched his career as a full-time actor.

== Partal filmography ==
=== Film ===
As actor

- Art of the Devil (2004)
- Art of the Devil 2 (2005)
- Alone (2007)
- The Screen at Kamchanod (2007)
- Art of the Devil 3 (2008)
- Miss You Again (2009)
- Sawasdee Bangkok (Charming Bangkok) (segment Phi Makham; 2010)
- Boonchu 10 (2010)
- The HZ Comedians (2011)
- Dark Flight (2012)
- 4 Kings (15 minutes short film; 2014) (Note: A manuscript of 4 Kings in 2021.)
- Ghost Coins (2015)
- Khun Phan (2016)

=== TV series ===
- The Legend of King Naresuan: The Series - Hongsawadee's Hostage (2017)
- Bangkok Ghost Stories (ep House, No. 10; 2018)

As director

- Khon kham dan (2010; short film — received the runner-up award at the Film Expo Asia 2010)
