= 4 Tigers (film) =

- Film poster
- Directed by: Kongkiat Komesiri
- Written by: Sukosin Akkrapat; Nakarin Gakhan; Kongkiat Komesiri; Kritmongkol Pienthong
- Produced by: Somsak Techarattanaprasert
- Starring: Sukollawat Kanaros; Mario Maurer; Arak Amornsupasiri; Phakin Khamwilaisak; Matchanat Suwannamas; Thotsapol Maisuk; Phonlawat Manuprasert
- Cinematography: Pramett Chankrasse
- Edited by: Weerapat Tembundit
- Music by: Terdsak Janpan
- Production company: Kongkiat Production
- Distributed by: Sahamongkol Film International
- Release date: October 23, 2025
- Running time: 140 minutes
- Country: Thailand
- Languages: Thai; Teochew
- Box office: ฿41.95 million (Bangkok, Metropolitan & Chiang Mai) ฿102.08 million (nationwide)

4 Tigers (Thai: เสือ) is a 2025 Thai action, thriller, and fantasy film directed by Kongkiat Komesiri, director of the Khun Pan film series, all three installments. It stars Sukollawat Kanaros, Mario Maurer, Arak Amornsupasiri, Phakin Khamwilaisak, Matchanat Suwannamas, Thotsapol Maisuk, and Phonlawat Manuprasert. It was released on October 23, 2025.

This film is part of the Khun Pan universe, serving as the first chapter that tells the heroic stories of the four central tigers: Suea Fai, Suea Mahesuan, Suea Bai, and Suea Dam, before they become the major rivals of the sorcerer Khun Pantharak Ratchadet in the Khun Pan trilogy. In this film, the actor who plays the role of 'Suea Fai' has been changed from Lieutenant General Wanchana Sawasdee, who previously played the role in Khun Pan 2 and Khun Pan 3, to Sukollawat Kanaros.

== Cast and characters ==
Cast	Characters
Sukollawat Kanaros	Suea Fai
Mario Maurer	Suea Mahesuan
Arak Amornsupasiri	Suea Bai
Phakin Khamwilaisak	Suea Dum
Matchanat Suwannamas	Rosarin
Thotsapol Maisuk	Luang Prasan
Phonlawat Manuprasert	Field Marshal Lert
Kessarin Ektawatkul	Linda
Akarin Akaranitimaytharatt	Seree

== Production ==
=== Filming ===
The scene where all four main characters ride horses across the open fields was filmed at Pasak Cholasit Dam, on the border of Lopburi and Saraburi provinces. When the water level drops, this area becomes a vast open plain, suitable for grazing animals such as sheep or goats, and also serves as an excellent location for setting up tents for tourism purposes.

=== Post-production ===
In May 2025, Sahamongkol Film International held an official closing ceremony for the film 4 Tigers, with the cast, crew, and executives of Sahamongkol Film International attending the ceremony.

On September 30, 2025, a press conference was held to launch the film "4 Tigers" at the General Post Office. The event also saw the release of the full trailer of the film for the first time. The film received production funding from the Ministry of Culture.

== Reception ==
Due to the film's success (both box office revenue and critical reception), Sahamongkol Film announced a sequel to expand the Tigers universe.
