= Sukollawat Kanaros =

Thai actor, model and singer

- ศุกลวัฒน์ คณารศ
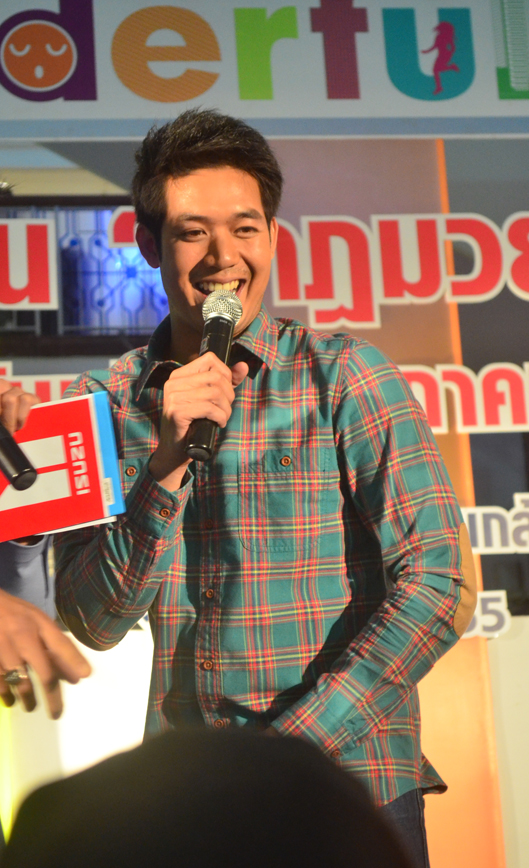
- Weir in 2012
- Born: 18 April 1985 (age 41); Mueang Khon Kaen District, Khon Kaen Province, Thailand
- Other name: Weir
- Education: Faculty of Engineering, Khon Kaen University; Kantana Institute
- Occupations: Actor; Singer; MC; YouTuber
- Years active: 2006–present
- Agent: Channel 7 (2006–present)
- Height: 1.85 m (6 ft 1 in)
- Spouse: Vicky Phimonya Wetparivat (m. 2022)

Sukollawat Kanaros (Thai: ศุกลวัฒน์ คณารศ, RTGS: Sukonlawat Khanarot; born 18 April 1985), nicknamed Weir, is a Thai actor and singer. He is seen on Thai television Channel 7.

== Early life and education ==
Weir was born on 18 April 1985, in Khon Kaen, Thailand. He is the second son of Veera and Ploypailin. He also had an older brother who died in 2009.

He graduated from kindergarten, primary and secondary school from the Demonstration School of Khon Kaen University (Mor Din Daeng). He went on to earn a bachelor's from the Department of Civil Engineering at Khon Kaen University and a master's in entertainment media management from Kantana Institute.

== Career ==
Weir entered the entertainment industry from a help of Supachai who later became his personal manager. Accidentally, Supachai saw Weir's photo on his acquaintance's cell phone and realized the commercial potential of Weir's look in the entertainment industry. Then, he decided to fly to Khon Kaen where Weir lived to persuade him to work in entertainment industry. At that time, Weir was still in his second year of university.

After gaining permission from his parents, Weir decided to enter the industry and later, became a successful and prominent actor. His first acting involvement was with the story Plik Din Su Dao. He was also involved in some theatrical works, such as Pleng Rak Rim Fah Khong (with the co-star Alexandra Thidawan Boonchuay). Besides involvement in movies and dramas, Weir is also a star on Channel 7 program of young mother.

Weir loves riding big motorbike and on his day off, he likes planting and taking care of the plants he bought in Nakhon Nayok.

== Filmography ==
=== Films ===
Year	Title	Role	Notes
2008	Where the Miracle Happens	Pobthum	
2014	The Teacher's Diary	Nui	Supporting role
2014	กลับบ้าน	เวียร์	
2016	Ghost Is All Around		
2017	Malila: The Farewell Flower	Shane	Main role
2019	Dew	Phop [Adult]	
2020	Love U Kohk-E-Kueng	Tossapol	
2020	E Riam Sing	Kla	
2022	Thirteen Lives	Saman Kunan	Hollywood debut film
2023	Home for Rent	Kawin	
2023	Once Upon A Star	Manit	Netflix film
2024	Bangkok Breaking: Heaven and Hell	Wanchai	Netflix film
TBA	Fatherland	Taron	Canceled
2025	4 Tigers	Suea Fai	Spin-off of Khun Pan trilogy

=== Television series ===
Year	Title	Role	Network	Notes
2006	Plik Din Su Dao	Tewit "Te"	Channel 7	
2006	Sai Nam Sam Chiwit	Sukrom	Channel 7	
2006	Pharakit Phichit Dok Fa	Somsanuk Suksommai	Channel 7	
2007	Phleng Rak Rim Fang Khong	Ai Phin	Channel 7	
2007	Dang Duang Haruethai	Chao Lang Rangsimantarat	Channel 7	
2008	Thoe Khue Chiwit	Tomon	Channel 7	
2008	Khun Nu Thewada	Daen/Daen	Channel 7	
2008	Yoei Fa Tha Din	Pol.Capt. Phawin Chanachon	Channel 7	
2008	Poot Mae Nam Khong/Poot Maenamkhong	Dr. Akkhani	Channel 7	
2008	Anuphap Pho Khun Ramkhamhaeng	Saamsorn/Saamsorn	Channel 7	
2009	Wongwian Huachai	Thot Khanaphan	Channel 7	
2010	Pho Nu Pen Superstar	Daenthep Yutdamrong	Channel 7	
2010	Phra Chan Lai Phayak	Anon Singhachat	Channel 7	
2010	Duai Raeng Athitthan	Krit	Channel 7	
2010	Ngao Kammathep	Rom Phakanan "Nai Hua"	Channel 7	
2011	Mon Rak Mae Nam Mun	Phin Lammaemun	Channel 7	
2011	Nang Sao Chamlaeng Rak	Khimmahan "Muhan" Prachanban	Channel 7	
2011	Nang Fa Kap Mafia	Ram/Lak Rattanamani	Channel 7	
2011	Phaen Din Mahatsachan	Phet	Channel 7	
2012	Khun Det (2012)	Yongyut	Channel 7	
2012	Pin Anong	Chalit Thamrongrat "Khun Yai"	Channel 7	
2012	Pbah Nang Sua 2	Nai Yai	Channel 7	
2013	Roi Le Sane Luang	Krao Supphakan	Channel 7	
2013	Nak Su Maha Kan	Rit Rawi/Mr. Thomas/Ritravee/Mr. Thomas Liu	Channel 7	
2014	Yommaban Chao Kha	Det-anan	Channel 7	cameo appearance
2014	La Rak Sut Khop Fah	Khamin	Channel 7	
2014	Rak Tem Ban	Mahasamut	Channel 7	cameo appearance
2014	Phrao	Somchai	Channel 7	
2015	Phuean Phaeng	Lor	Channel 7	
2015	Morasum Sawat	Sayomphu (Phu)	Channel 7	
2016	Phet Tud Phet	Chart	Channel 7	
2016	Tai Rom Pra Baramee	Kru Uthai	Channel 7	EP :Kru Kong Pandin
2017	Koo Za Rot Zab	Mr. Korn	Channel 7	
2017	Niew Hua Jai Sood Glai Puen	Captain Puir	Channel 7	
2017	Meu Brap Jao Hua Jai	Captain Puir	Channel 7	cameo appearance
2017	Ratchanawee Tee Ruk	Captain Puir	Channel 7	cameo appearance
2017	Yeut Fah Ha Pigat Ruk	Captain Puir	Channel 7	cameo appearance
2018	Sampatan Hua Jai	Naboon	Channel 7	
2019	Pachara Montra	Nadon / Don	Channel 7	
2019	Poo Bao Indy Yayee Inter	Tossapol	Channel 7	
2019	Yod Rak Nakrob	YodRak / Nakrob	Channel 7	
2020	Marn Bang Jai	Taen	Channel 7	–
2021	Bangkok Breaking	Wanchai	Netflix	
2022	Krong Nampueng	Chalampon/Chalampon	Channel 7 (CH7)	
2022	Mae Kong		Channel 7 (CH7)	
2025	The Resurrected		Netflix	

=== Master of Ceremony: MC ON TV ===
Year	Thai title	English title	Network	Notes
2016–present	ซูเปอร์เวียร์	Super Weir	7HD35	Every public holiday

=== Advertising ===
Year	Thai title	English title	With
2017	น้ำแร่ธรรมชาติตราช้าง	Natural mineral water Chang	
2019	เครื่องดื่ม กระทิงแดง	Drink Krating Daeng	
2019	ปูนเสือ	Tiker Mortar	
2019	เคอร์รี่ เอ็กเพรส	Kerry Express	
2020	ยาสีฟันเทพไทย		Ranee Campen
2020	ซุปเปอร์กาแฟ เคียงคู่สู้กับคุณทุกวัน (ภาพยนตร์โฆษณา)		

== Awards and nominations ==
Year	Award	Category	Nominated work	Result
2006	Star Entertainment Awards	Best Rising Actor Top Awards	—N/a	Won
2007	Komchadluek Awards	Highly Popular Leading Actor	—N/a	Won
2007	Golden TV Award 22nd Award Show	Best Leading Song	"Pleng Ruk Rim Fung Khong"	Won
2008	Men Awards	Zen Popular Vote Award by Raimond Land Zen Stylish	—N/a	Won
2008	IN Young Generation Choice Award	Cutest Couple	Khemanit Jamikorn	Won
2010	Khon Kaen University	Most Pride Alumn	—N/a	Won
2010	Top Awards	Best Actor in a Lakorn (Parajan Lai Payak)	—N/a	Nominated
2010	TV Inside Hot Awards	Hot Couple of the Year	Khemanit Jamikorn	Won
2012	The Journey of the 1st Anniversary number 1 Award	No.1 Hot Male superstar of the year	—N/a	Won
2012	Men Health Award	Guy Challenger	—N/a	Won
2013	Channel 7 Sang San Awards	No.1 Koo Gine	Min Peechaya Wattanamontree	Won
2013	Channel 7 Sang San Awards	Viewers Favorite Male Actor of the Year	—N/a	Won
2013	Channel 7 Sang San Awards	Leading Actor Performance Award	—N/a	Won
2013	Idols	Spicy 100 Most Spic	—N/a	Won
2015	Actor 2015	Mthai Top Talk About	—N/a	Won
2015	Siam Entertainment Star's Light Awards	Popular Leading Actor	—N/a	Won
2016	Kom Chad Luek Awards	Best Leading Actor of the Year	—N/a	Won
2016	Nine Entertain Awards	Leading Actor of the Year	—N/a	Won
2016	Nataraja Awards	Best Leading Actor	—N/a	Won
2016	Maya Awards	Best Leading Actor Kwan Jai Mahachon / view sweeties	—N/a	Won
2018	12th Asian Film Awards	Best Actor	Malila: The Farewell Flower	Nominated
