= Mongkolkit Suksintharanon =

Thai politician

- มงคลกิตติ์ สุขสินธารานนท์
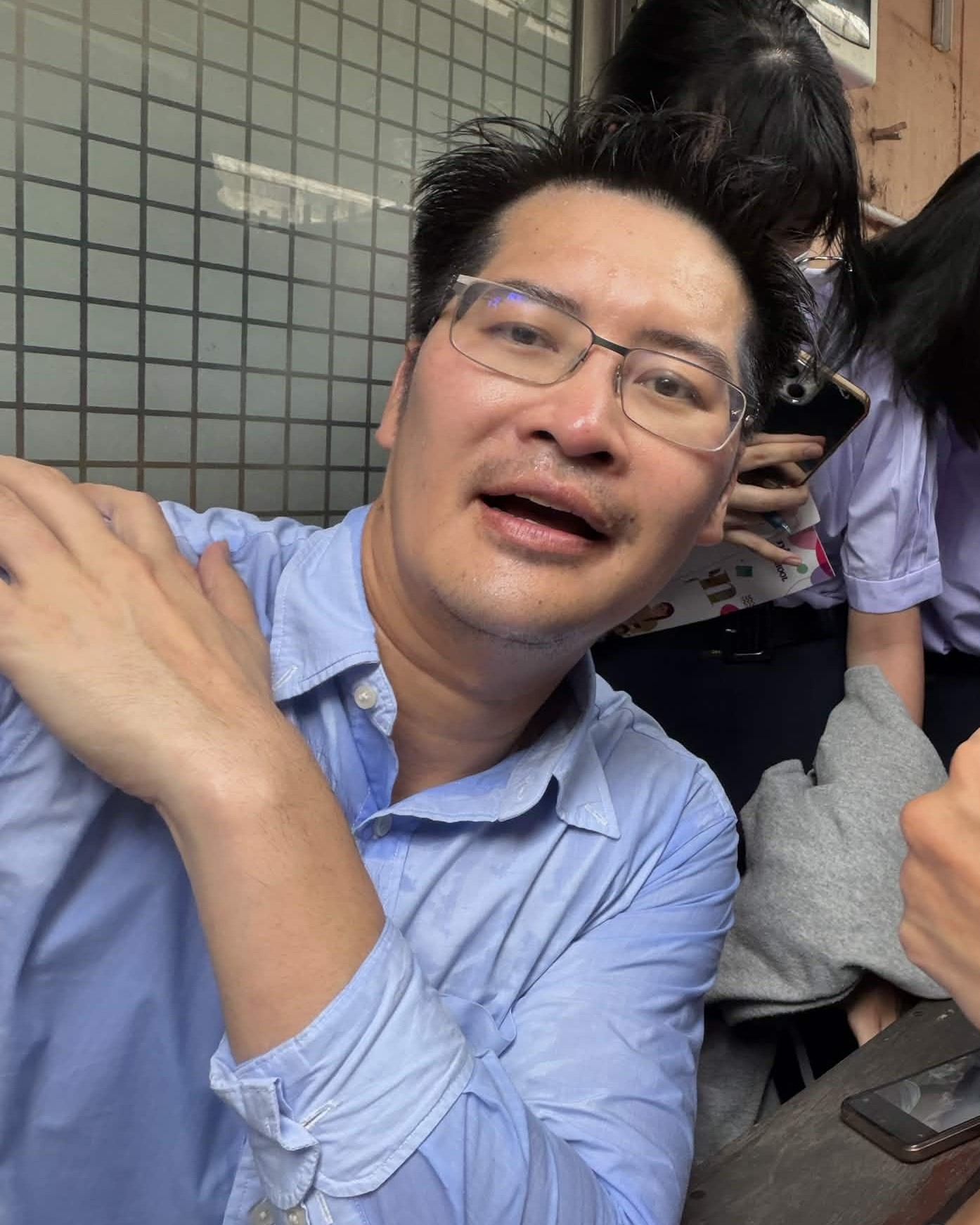
- Mongkolkit at the Samsen Wittayalai School meetup in May 2026

Member of the House of Representatives
- In office 24 March 2019 – 17 February 2023
- Constituency: Party-list

Personal details
- Born: Thana Suksintharanon; 25 September 1981 (age 45) Phitsanulok, Thailand
- Party: Progressive Advance Party (2026–)
- Other political affiliations: Pracharaj Party (2007–2010); Thai Liberal Party (2013–2018); Thai Civilized Party (2018–2024); Democrat Party (2024–2025); New Alternative Party (2025–2026)
- Spouses: Phatthanan Ritchairuangdet (m. 2006); Phakorn Chantharakhana (m. 2010; div. 2018)
- Children: 4, including Bawonlak, Phitpanita, Nattaphol, Yada
- Education: King Mongkut's University of Technology North Bangkok (BE)

Mongkolkit Suksintharanon (Thai: มงคลกิตติ์ สุขสินธารานนท์, born September 25, 1981) is a Thai politician and activist who served as a Member of the House of Representatives in the 25th National Assembly of Thailand from 2019 to 2023, representing the Thai Civilized Party as a party-list member. He was appointed the specialist in the Congress of National Reform as part of the National Reform Plan led by the National Council for Peace and Order (NCPO) from 2014 to its dissolution in 2019.

Mongkolkit was the founder and the former party leader of the Thai Civilized Party from 2018 until his resignation in 2024. He then served as an advisor for the Democrat Party in 2024. On December 28, 2025, he joined the New Alternative Party as the secretary-general. He later became the party’s representative and candidate for Prime Minister in the 2026 general election. After the election, he resigned from the New Alternative Party.

He is a politician who frequently attracts public attention through unconventional and sometimes daring actions. He also runs in virtually every election, usually representing small parties with slim chances of electoral success. Consequently, he is often seen as a political novelty rather than a serious contender.

== Early life and education ==
Mongkolkit Suksintharanon was born in Phitsanulok, Thailand, on September 25, 1981, to his father, Thanakorn Sriboonmark, and his mother, Rattanawan Saeshou. He was raised in a family of Thai-Chinese descent. His nickname is "Tae", and his birth name was Thana Suksintharanon. His maternal surname prefix “Sae” indicated that he had a Thai-Chinese ancestry. His uncle, Professor Emeritus Kirkkiet Pipatseritham, is a former rector of Thammasat University.

In his early years, Mongkolkit attended several schools in Phisanulok Province. He initially attended Thai Klao Wittaya School for Kindergarten 1 and 2 (Anuban), and later Kindergarten 3 at Ban Plai Chunphon School. Primary education (Prathom) from Wat Sri Wisuttharam School. He attended Phitsanulok Pittayakom School to complete his lower secondary education (Matthayom-Ton). At 18, Mongkolkit entered King Mongkut’s University of Technology North Bangkok (KMUTNB) to continue his undergraduate study in Electrical Engineering (Power Engineering Specialty). He obtained his bachelor's degree in 2003. Later, he continued his graduate studies to pursue a Master's degree in political science (Politics and Government) at Thammasat University. He earned a Doctor of Public Administration (D.P.A.) from Thaksin University. Since he has attained education up to the doctorate level, he is referred to as Dr. Mongkolkit Suksintharanon.

== Entry into politics ==
Mongkolkit Suksintharanon began to appear in Thai politics in 2007 during the Thai general election, running as a member of the Pracharaj Party, a populist party that fields candidates nationwide. Although he was not elected as an MP, the campaign marked his first participation in national politics.

Following the election, Mongkolkit continued to be involved in politics and civil activities. During that time, he became involved in anti-corruption and governance reform projects. He served as secretary-general of the National Joint Partnership for Anti-Corruption, a civil society organization supporting the enforcement of anti-corruption laws and government transparency. This role enhanced his image as an activist advocating for corruption reform.

Mongkolkit participated in the government’s reform led by General Prayut Chan-o-cha, who established the NCPO following the 2014 military coup d’etat. He was appointed as an expert member of the National Reform Council (NRC) on 1 November 2014, joining a group of 250 members. Then he was tasked with reform implementation across multiple sectors, including political governance, anti-corruption mechanisms, and public administration. The National Reform Council dissolved on September 6, 2015. Subsequently, the NCPO established the National Reform Steering Assembly (NRSA) to continue the reform process. Mongkolkit was reappointed as a member, serving from October 13, 2015, to August 3, 2017.

After the assembly reform concluded, Mongkolkit returned to politics. In 2018, he became one of the founders of the Thai Civilized Party, a minor political party established ahead of Thailand’s 2019 general election. The party was officially registered on 2 March 2018, and later that year, Mongkolkit was selected as its leader. The party promoted policies focused on anti-corruption measures, social justice, and economic proposals aimed at improving welfare for lower-income groups.

The Thai Civilized Party fielded candidates in Thailand's 2019 general election, which was the country's first election since the 2014 coup. Mongkolkit ran as a party-list candidate, and the party received 60,354 votes nationwide, which was enough to secure a single seat in the House of Representatives under Thailand's electoral criteria at the time. This resulted in Mongkolkit becoming a member of the 25th National Legislative Assembly (2019–2023), marking his successful first entry into the national legislature.

== Political career ==
=== Member of Parliament (2019–2023) ===
After he entered parliament, Mongkolkit often acted as a spokesperson for minor parties in coalition negotiations and parliamentary debates. In 2020, several small coalition parties proposed him as a potential candidate for a ministerial position during discussions of a cabinet reshuffle, citing his leadership among small party representatives.

Throughout his tenure, Mongkolkit gained prominence among Thailand's smaller political parties in parliament as the sole representative of the Thai Civilized Party. He often took part in political conversations with minor coalition members during the formation of Prayut Chan-o-cha's coalition and made public remarks about coalition negotiations through parliamentary debates. He advocated for anti-corruption measures, offered economic proposals aimed at boosting state revenue, and made statements on government policy.

Among the most extensively discussed ideas Mongkolkit put forth as an MP is the plan to boost the economy by integrating entertainment hubs, including regulated casinos. According to the plan, hotels, retail malls, theme parks, and other tourist amenities might draw tourists from abroad and increase government revenue. He reasoned that a large number of Thai nationals were already using foreign platforms for internet gambling, which meant that potential tax revenue was leaving the nation. Therefore, Mongkolkit proposed to liberalize domestic casino operations to lower illicit online gambling activities. With more than 300 votes in favor, the motion was approved, and a committee made up of cabinet ministers and lawmakers from various political parties was entrusted with investigating the proposal's possible economic advantages and regulatory framework.

=== Public visibility and political debates ===
Mongkolkit was also known for his numerous interactions with the media and his vocal public remarks. After the ruling party member, Sonthiya Sawasdee, petitioned for the NACC to investigate his ethical misconduct as an MP. He gained media attention in 2021 when he proposed a kickboxing match with Prime Minister Prayut Chan-o-cha to "represent people who are willing to challenge the prime minister" amid the 2021 Bangkok Protests stemming from the government's response to the COVID-19 pandemic.

According to Mongkolkit, the act was meant to serve as a satirical remark that political disputes can be resolved diplomatically in contrast to violence imposed by the authority on protesters in the streets. Politicians and journalists debated the statement, which garnered publicity in Thai media. While some saw it as a political ploy, others saw it as an illustration of his unorthodox political approach.

=== After the 2023 general election ===
Following the 2023 Thai general election, the Thai Civilized Party failed to secure any parliamentary seats, so Mongkolkit lost his position as an MP. He remained involved in Thai politics after the election. Mongkolkit temporarily reduced his political activity before later joining the Democrat Party in 2024 as an advisor, before leaving the Thai Civilized Party. Since then, he has persisted in offering commentary on political events and taking part in Thai public hearings. He subsequently left the party in 2025 and continued political activities through other minor political groups and parties.

After Abhisit Vejjajiva returned to serve as leader of the Democrat Party in October 2025, he later resigned from the position. Subsequently, in the 2026 general election, he joined the New Alternative Party, a political party founded and led by Rachen Trakulwiang, a politician based in Nonthaburi, which is also Mongkolkit's home province. He was appointed as the party's secretary-general and was placed third on the party-list electoral slate. Following the election, the party secured only one seat, which went to Rachen, the party leader. Later, a conflict arose between him and the party leadership, and the party issued a statement removing him from his position. He subsequently resigned from the party and went on to establish a new political party called the Progressive Advance Party (Kao Lam Party).

=== 2026 Bangkok gubernatorial election ===
In the Bangkok gubernatorial election held the same year, Mongkolkit was unable to run as a candidate himself because his registered residence had not been in Bangkok for the minimum one-year period required by law. Instead, he established his own political group called "Bangkok Can Fly", which endorsed Pasapong Chaiwirinyavanich as its candidate for Governor of Bangkok. Mongkolkit served as the campaign leader and chairman of the governor's advisory team. His platform featured a number of highly unconventional and ambitious proposals in his characteristic style, including making the water in Khlong Saen Saep drinkable, enabling vehicles in Bangkok to fly, bringing dinosaurs back to life, and launching a project to allow Thai citizens to travel into space with support from the Bangkok Metropolitan Administration. On the candidate registration day, when he arrived at Bangkok City Hall 2, the venue for the registration process, together with his campaign team, he performed push-ups in front of reporters. The push-ups were also connected to one of his policy initiatives, which aimed to encourage Bangkok residents to maintain strong physical health and exercise regularly.

== Controversies ==
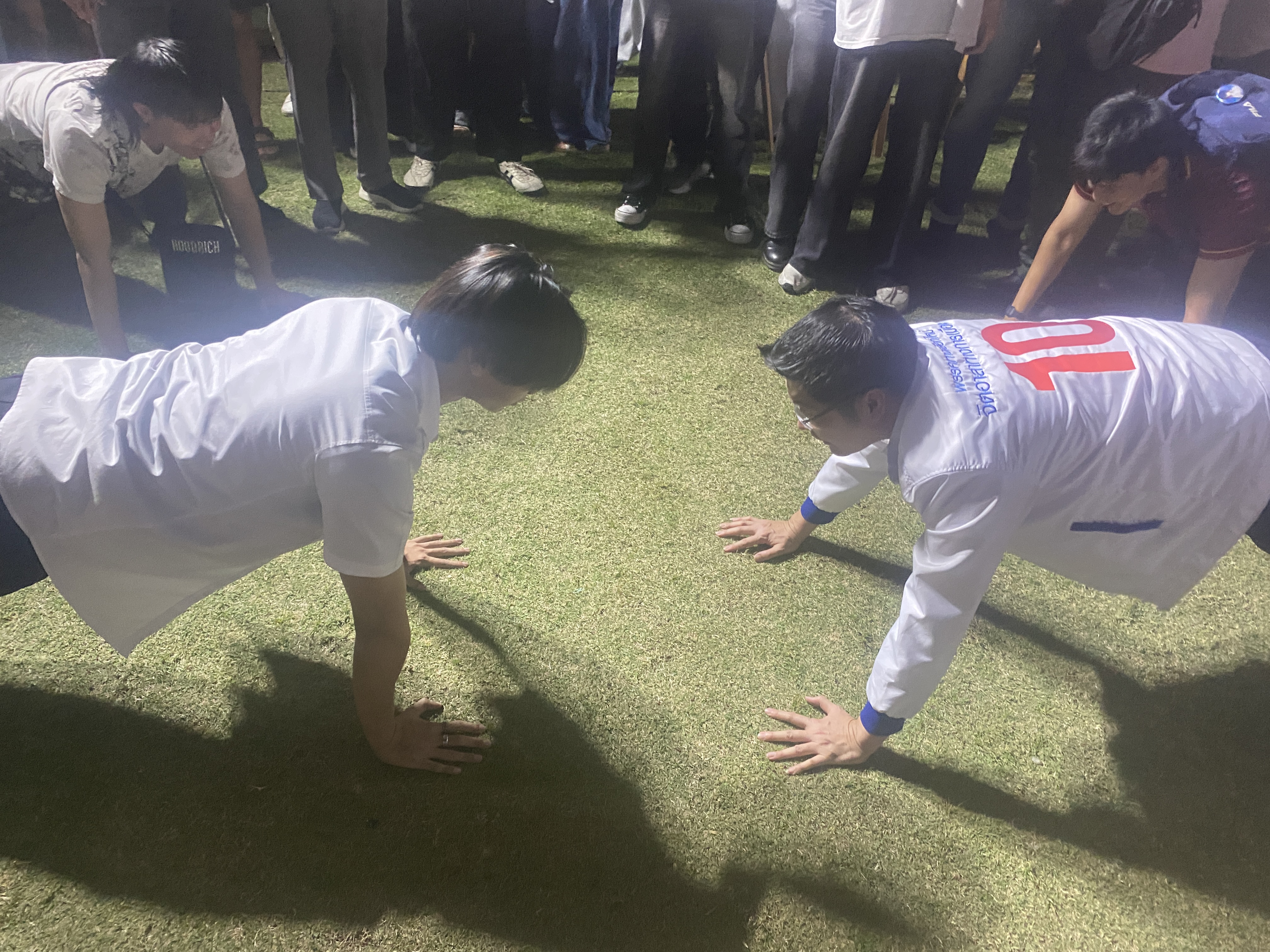
Mongkolkit did push-ups with students from Srinakharinwirot University during campaign activities for the 2026 general election

Mongkolkit is a politician known for his attention-grabbing and highly unconventional style of political activity. He often refers to himself as "P'Tae 007" (Brother Tae 007) or "P'Tae Rama VII" (Brother Tae of Rama VII). He frequently recounts stories from his youth, particularly his time as a vocational student, claiming that he was regularly involved in fights with students from other schools and rival groups. He has asserted that he once fought a professional boxer and emerged victorious. He has also claimed that on one occasion he faced a rival group alone despite being outnumbered by more than ten opponents.

However, many of these stories were later disputed by senior alumni from the same educational institution, who stated that the claims were not true. In addition, he has frequently involved himself in high-profile news events, even when they were unrelated to his official responsibilities. One notable example was the case of actress Nida "Tangmo" Patcharaveerapong, who died after falling into the Chao Phraya River in 2022 near a pier in downtown Nonthaburi. Mongkolkit took part in the search efforts and conducted his own informal investigation into the incident. During this period, he publicly accused a local fisherman of involvement, but subsequent investigations found no evidence supporting the allegation. He also claimed that a friend of his at NASA would use satellite technology to determine the exact location where the actress had fallen into the river. This was one of several extraordinary claims that attracted public attention.

As a result of a series of such incidents, political journalists awarded him the nickname "The Fallen Star" at the end of that year. The nickname reflected a perception that he often presented himself as someone who had answers to every issue, while frequently lacking reliable evidence or expertise regarding the matters on which he commented.

=== Accusation of Ethical Misconduct: Absent from the parliamentary meeting. ===
In 2021, Mongkolkit was accused of violating parliamentary ethics after a complaint was filed by political activist Mr. Rungkrai Leekitwattana. The complaint alleged that he left the parliamentary chamber early to take vocational students to see the movie "4 Kings." The incident occurred on December 15, 2021, when reports indicated he left the House of Representatives chamber around 2:00 PM, despite the meeting being scheduled to continue until 4:30 PM, to attend a 5:40 PM movie screening with students. He was criticized for failing to attend an important parliamentary session without a valid reason.

Subsequently, the National Anti-Corruption Commission (NACC) voted 6 to 1 that his actions constituted a serious breach of ethics and referred the case to the Supreme Court. Mongkolkit denied the allegations, stating that he had formally requested leave and that the activity was for civil service, as the film addressed conflicts among vocational students. He also claimed there were procedural errors in the investigation.

Overall, media opinion was negative towards his behavior. Due to its inappropriateness for a Member of Parliament, even though some agreed with the behavior by viewing it as an educational activity, most media outlets framed the event as bizarre and unsuitable for his duties.

=== Unconventional political campaign promises ===
In 2026, Mongkolkit Suksintharanon attracted public attention after proposing a number of policy ideas as part of his political platform. These included proposals such as the establishment of a “living dinosaur” theme park, a state-supported subsidy scheme for entertainment services, and a national security policy advocating for Thailand to possess nuclear weapons as a deterrent to the Cambodian-Thai border crisis.

The proposals were widely discussed in Thai media and online platforms, with critics questioning their feasibility, appropriateness, and potential legal implications. In particular, the nuclear policy proposal, which suggested that Thailand should possess at least ten nuclear weapons to enhance Thai hegemony, opposed the international norm. According to Mongkolkit, each nuclear warhead ranges from “small to large” and costs around 20-270 million baht, with enough blast radius to disintegrate the districts up to the provincial level. He justified his proposals, stating that they were intended as long-term strategic visions aimed at strengthening national security, economic competitiveness, and positioning Thailand amongst global powers.

Subsequently, the Election Commission of Thailand reviewed the campaign policies submitted by his party and indicated that some of the proposed measures may be impractical or potentially in violation of existing laws. The Commission issued a formal notice to the party and assigned further examination of the policies in question.

Overall, public reaction to these policy proposals was mixed. While some supporters viewed them as bold and unconventional ideas, many commentators and media outlets regarded them as unrealistic, irrelevant, or inappropriate for practical implementation.

== Personal life ==
He was first married to Phatthanan Ritchairuangdet. After their divorce, he married Phakorn Chantharakhana, daughter of Nayna Cheewanan, a prominent actress from Nakhon Sawan who was well known in the 1970s. The marriage later ended in divorce, after which he remarried Phatthanan. The couple have four children together. Although he and Phakorn eventually divorced, she and her younger brother, Sorakrit Chantharakhana, have remained among his political followers and supporters.
