= Khun Pan 3 =

- Film poster
- Directed by: Kongkiat Khomsiri
- Written by: Kongkiat Khomsiri
- Produced by: Somsak Techarattanaprasert
- Starring: Ananda Everingham; Mario Maurer; Phakin Khamwilaisak; Bhumibhat Thavornsiri; Sarika Sathsilpsupa; Chidjun Hung; Nutthanaphol Thinroj; Arak Amornsupasiri
- Cinematography: Pramett Chankrasse
- Edited by: Sunit Asavinikul; Phannipha Kabillikavanich; Muanfun Uppatham
- Music by: Terdsak Janpan
- Production company: Kongkiat Production
- Distributed by: Sahamongkol Film International
- Release date: March 1, 2023
- Running time: 156 minutes
- Country: Thailand
- Language: Thai
- Box office: ฿120 million (nationwide)

Khun Pan 3 (Thai: ขุนพันธ์ 3 ตอน วันพิพากษา, lit. 'Khun Pan 3: Judgment Day') is a 2023 Thai action fantasy thriller film from Sahamongkol Film International that was released on March 1, 2023, directed and written by Kongkiat Khomsiri, who was the director from the first and the second installment.

It is the third and final installment in the Khun Pan Trilogy, preceded by Khun Pan (2016) and Khun Pan 2 (2018).

Set in 1950, the story is adapted from a real contemporary event when Field Marshal P. Phibunsongkhram, then prime minister had the idea of moving the capital from Bangkok to Phetchabun. Including the assassination of four opposition politicians, the movie has Khun Pan involved as well.

Even though this movie series has completed, in a mid-credits scene there are still hints that there might be a spin-off of Captain Tatthep, with the final scene showing him surviving and becoming a successful rising politician. However, he was possessed by an evil spirit and has changed into an evil person.

== Cast ==
=== Main ===
- Ananda Everingham as Khun Pan
- Mario Maurer as Suea Mahesuan
- Phakin Khamwilaisak as Suea Dum
- Bhumibhat Thavornsiri as Captain Tatthep

=== Supporting ===
- Sarika Sathsilpsupa as Sawitree
- Chidjun Hung as Noon
- Nutthanaphol Thinroj as Suea Jerd
- Chalad Na Songkhla as Luang Dejjamras
- Preecha Khetkhum as Chief Nome

=== Guest appearances ===
- Arak Amornsupasiri as Suea Bai
- Krissada Sukosol Clapp as Al Hawi Yalu
- Wanchana Sawatdee as Suea Fai
- Oliver Bever as Deputy Chief of Defense Staff
- Sonthaya Chitmanee as Go Son
- Genggaaj Jongjaipra as Instructor
- Terdporn Manopaiboon as Venerable
- Nonzee Nimibutr as Editor in Chief

== Original soundtrack ==
- "Mue puen" (มือปืน; "Hitman"), ending theme by Krissada Sukosol Clapp and Phakin Khamwilaisak (original version by Pongsit Kamphee).

== Reception ==
At the end of March, the month of release. It grossed 120 million baht nationwide, making it the first Thai film of the year to gross more than 100 million baht.
