= Tee Yai =

Thai criminal

- Born: Pairote Changkhian (birth name); February 1, 1952; Don Phai, Damnoen Saduak, Ratchaburi, Thailand
- Died: February 26, 1981 (aged 29); Samut Sakhon, Thailand
- Cause of death: Assassination by gunshot
- Other names: Kornprasert Changkhian (later name); Tee Yai
- Criminal charges: Robbery, assault, assault of an officer, felony murder
- Criminal status: Most wanted criminal by the Royal Thai Police

Tee Yai (Thai: ตี๋ใหญ่, RTGS: Tee Yài, pronounced [/tiː jàj]; lit. 'The big Chinese guy'; February 1, 1952 – February 26, 1981), whose real name was Kornprasert Changkhian (กรประเสริฐ ช่างเขียน), was a notorious Thai bandit active from the mid-1970s to the early 1980s. He was the most wanted criminal by the Royal Thai Police at the time.

== Biography ==
He was born in Damnoen Saduak district, Ratchaburi province, into a Sino-Thai family that made a living from vegetable farming. He grew up in an environment surrounded by canals and the network of orchard ditches shaped his childhood, leading him to train his breath-holding by breathing through lotus stems from a young age. As a child, he was polite and non-confrontational, often bullied, and showed no signs of becoming a criminal. As he grew older, his family sent him to work as a vegetable porter at Maha Nak market in Bangkok. There, he was harassed by local toughs. Combined with his coming of age, this pushed him to start standing up for himself.

He began his path into crime as a street tough, snatching necklaces with a group of associates in his hometown of Damnoen Saduak. His first robbery took place in 1973 at the house of a wealthy resident in the same area. He later gained notoriety by carrying out a series of robberies across the central region of Thailand, as well as in parts of Bangkok.

Tee Yai earned a reputation as a daring outlaw. He was arrested only once, following a tip from a citizen about a furniture store robbery in Phasi Charoen. However, he was later sent to Chiang Mai to participate in a police reconstruction for a previous gold shop robbery. During his return trip from Chiang Mai in 1975, he famously escaped from police custody by jumping off a moving train and even managed to break free from handcuffs by hiding beneath a bridge, letting a passing train sever them. Despite the dramatic escape, he was held in custody for only 30 days. He had pretended to ask to use the restroom, then leapt out of the train's bathroom window while it was in motion. He was also known to have stormed a military prison to rescue one of his imprisoned associates. In addition, many believed that Tee Yai possessed supernatural powers, with protective charms that allowed him to vanish at will, which helped him evade capture time and again. One famous story tells of him being surrounded by more than 200 police officers in Nonthaburi for 18 hours, yet he and his group managed to slip through the cordon unnoticed and disappear mysteriously. In reality, however, he took advantage of moments when attention lapsed, blending in and escaping. He then hid in the irrigation ditches of nearby durian orchards, using the breath-holding skills he had trained since childhood. His weapon of choice was an 11 mm Colt M1911A1 pistol. In his many robberies, the heist that yielded the largest haul occurred on August 5, 1977, when he robbed a gold shop in Bangkok, making off with assets valued at approximately 1,000,000 baht.

Because he was constantly on the run, he had no permanent residence and was extremely cautious. Even some of his own subordinates could not easily meet him unless they had truly earned his trust. Bandol Tanthapiboon, a police officer who infiltrated his gang for four years, reportedly never even saw his real face. He had several wives, some of whom were prostitutes. To conceal his identity, he used different names with them, such as "Jack" or "Pairote." Even while sleeping, he remained alert. He would hold a burning incense stick between his toes, and when it burned down, he would wake up and move to a new location.

He also had a distinctive style. He wore his hair in a long bob, dressed in a plaid long sleeve shirt with Levi's jeans, wore Ray-Ban sunglasses, and Converse sneakers. During his robberies, Tee Yai was often described as ruthless, sometimes killing his victims and issuing threats in a terrifying voice. However, there were also stories that at times he targeted only the wealthy, and that he never forgot those who had once helped him, occasionally leaving a share of his loot in front of their homes in return. Before carrying out a robbery, he would carefully study his target for months, personally surveying the location and planning every detail. According to an interview with his senior relative on the TV program Bang Or on Channel 9 in 2008, he was also fond of wearing a cowboy hat, inspired by his admiration for Suea Bai, a legendary bandit from the World War II era.

== Death ==
Tee Yai died on February 26, 1981, at the age of 29. It is said that he was on the run at the time. The day before, he had asked one of his men to drive him in a pickup truck to visit a revered monk, Luang Pho Sut of Wat Kalong in Samut Sakhon, to obtain new protective amulets, as his previous ones, including his takrut and Buddha amulets, had been lost after visiting a brothel. However, he did not get to meet the monk. On the way back, he was betrayed by a companion who was also one of his subordinates, who shot and killed him before quickly fleeing the vehicle. When the police later arrived, they opened fire on the truck, not realizing that Tee Yai was already dead inside. According to a former member of his gang, the subordinate who betrayed him had been hired by the police for 200,000 baht and was promised help in clearing two murder charges. In this account, Tee Yai was not killed by the police at all. Not long afterward, the betrayer himself was shot dead in a market by another of Tee Yai's men, who reportedly shouted, "Tee, I've avenged you."

After his death, rumors persisted that he was still alive. Some claimed he had fled to the United States, while others believed he lost his supposed supernatural protection because he had hidden under a woman's sarong, which in Thai belief is considered impure, causing his powers to fade. His story has continued to be told over the years. However, in 2008, his mother confirmed that Tee Yai had indeed passed away.

== In popular culture ==
He was portrayed as a character in many Thai television series and movies. In the 1985 Channel 5 television drama Tee Yai (ตี๋ใหญ่) he was portrayed by Chatchai Plengpanich (Note: It was the breakthrough work of Chatchai Plengpanich, whose father was a police officer and a member of the team that hunted down Tee Yai. Chatchai once said that, as a child, he had actually seen the real Tee Yai in person.). In Tee Yai (ตี๋ใหญ่) (Channel 3, 1999) he was portrayed by Sornram Teppitak. In 2011, Tee Yai was adapted into a B movie. For the first time, he was portrayed as a masterful, almost magical outlaw in Tee Yai Jom Kamungweth (ตี๋ใหญ่ จอมขมังเวทย์), played by Pawarith Monkolpisit, while in Petch-cha-kat Dao Jone (เพชฌฆาตดาวโจร) (ONE31, 2016) by Phakin Khamwilaisak. In the two-season television series The Legendary Outlaw (ตี๋ใหญ่ ดับ ดาว โจร, and ตี๋ใหญ่ 2 ดับ เครื่อง ชน) (MONO29, 2016–2018) he was portrayed by Somchai Kemglad, and in Meu Prab Yeow Dum (มือปราบเหยี่ยวดำ) (Channel 7, 2018) by Rapeepat Eakpankul. (Note: The story was adapted from a book of the same title by Pol. Col. Bandol Tanthapiboon, a former police officer who was part of the task force pursuing Tee Yai and was known by the nickname ''Black Hawk Hunter," the same name used in the drama series.) In the 2025 Netflix movie Tee Yai: Born to Be Bad (ตี๋ใหญ่ ฤกษ์ดาวโจร), directed by Nonzee Nimibutr, he was portrayed by Nattawin Wattanagitiphat. (Note: The director, Nonzee Nimibutr, was also inspired by his own experiences growing up in Nonthaburi, where he witnessed police chasing Tee Yai firsthand as a high school student.)
