= The Last Shot (disambiguation) =

The Last Shot is a 2004 comedy film

The Last Shot may also refer to:

- The Last Shot (1951 film), a 1951 West German drama film
- The Last Shot (2025 film), a 2025 Thai drama crime film
- The Last Shot (basketball), Michael Jordan's game-winning shot in Game 6 of the 1998 NBA Finals
- Last Shot: A Final Four Mystery, a young adult novel by John Feinstein
- Last Shot (Gregg Hurwitz novel), a novel by Gregg Hurwitz
- Nothing Underneath, a 1985 giallo film also known as The Last Shot
- Last shot, in contract law
- "Last Shot", a song by Kip Moore
