= Itkron Pungkiatrussamee =

Thai musician and actor (born 1991)

Itkron Pungkiatrussamee อิชณน์กร พึ่งเกียรติรัศมี
- Also known as: Jaii; Jaii TaitosmitH
- Born: Itkron Pungkiatrussamee; November 15, 1991 (age 34); Songkhla, Thailand
- Genres: T-rock; phuea chiwit
- Occupations: Singer; musician; songwriter; actor
- Instrument: Acoustic guitar
- Years active: 2010s–present
- Label: Gene Lab
- Members: TaitosmitH

Itkron Pungkiatrussamee (Thai: อิชณน์กร พึ่งเกียรติรัศมี; born November 15, 1991), also familiarly known as Jaii TaitosmitH is a Thai musician, singer, guitarist, actor. He rose to fame as the lead singer of rock band TaitosmitH, and lead actor in several films.

== Early life ==
Born in Songkhla province, the hometown of his father, but was raised in Sakon Nakhon by his grandmother. Itkorn completed his secondary education at Thewphaingarm School and earned a bachelor's degree in Communication Arts from Bangkok University (BU), majoring in Performing Arts.

== Entertainment works ==
=== Studio albums ===
- TaitosmitH (ไททศมิตร; 2019)
- Phuea Chiwit Ku (เพื่อชีวิตกู; 2022)
- Phak Phit Sadan (ภาคพิศดาร; 2027)

=== Original soundtrack ===
Year	Thai title	Translate	For	Notes
2020	Yu-Titum (ยุติ-ธรรม)	"Justice"	Nemesis	
2021	Nak Leng Kao (นักเลงเก่า)	"Former Gangster"	4 Kings	feat D Gerrard
2021	Mung Kub Ku (มึงกับกู)	"You & I"	4 Kings	

=== Films ===
- 4 Kings (2021) as Billy (Note: Prior to that, he gained experience in street theatre performances.)
- 4 Kings II (2023) as Billy (cameo)
- In Youth We Trust (2024) as Gus
- The Cliche (2024) as Shoot
- The Stone (2025) as Seng

=== Stage play ===
- The Overture The Musical (2025) as Lt Col Veera

== Awards and nominations ==
Year	Award	Category	Result	Ref.
2021	18th Kom Chad Luek Awards	Best Actor	Won	
2021	30th Bangkok Critics Assembly Awards	Best Actor	Won	
2021	30th Suphannahong National Film Awards	Best Actor	Won	

== Political stance ==
He publicly announced that he would perform free of charge at every political rally held in 2020–2021 Thai protests. He expressed his support for the political stance of the younger generation movement.
