= Taitosmith =

Thai rock band

TaitosmitH
- Origin: Bangkok, Thailand
- Genres: Rock; post-rock; alternative; phleng phuea chiwit; neo soul; country; blues; pop (early works); indie
- Years active: 2018–present
- Labels: Gene Lab
- Members: Itkron Pungkiatrussamee; Trinnasit Siripitchayasan; Pannasit Sukahotu; Thanakit Songmuang; Jatsada Panya; Patanapoom Chaumpol

Taitosmith (Thai: ไททศมิตร; stylized as TaitosmitH) is a Thai rock band that defines itself as "a modern phleng phuea chiwit (Thai protest song) band".

== History ==
The band was formed in 2018 by two indie musicians, Itkron "Jaii" Pungkiatrussamee and Trinnasit "Most" Siripitchayasan. Then there were many others who joined until six was complete. They achieved rapid success with two easy listening singles Pattaya Lover and Pen Ta Li Tone (เป็นตะลิโตน) along with being invited to join the Thai PBS show "Nak Phajol Phleng", followed up with the third single Hello Mama in the same genre at the end of the year with lyrics in English mixed with Isan dialect.

The band has signed with Gene Lab in GMM Grammy network because the executive Panthapol "Ohm" Prasarnrajkit of the band Cocktail have watched the music clip Daeng Kub Kheo (แดงกับเขียว; "Red and Green") so they were persuaded to join in with the release of their first album TaitosmitH in 2019.

In early 2022, Taitosmith released the second album Phuea Chiwit Ku (เพื่อชีวิตกู; "For My Life") with a song that became viral in TikTok Nak Leng Kao (นักเลงเก่า; "Former Gangster") which is the soundtrack of the popular crime film 4 Kings that the vocalist Jaii also starred. Along with another song Thai Tae (ไทเท่; "Cool Thai") that features with the late luk thung (Thai country song) singer and national artist Waiphot Phetsuphan. It became Phetsuphan's last work.

Taitosmith's songs focuses on aspects of society, human life, economic issues, as well as political satire.

Name of the band "Taitosmith" consists of three elements. Tai (ไท) means "freedom", tos (ทศ) means "ten" and mith (มิตร) means "friendship". The overall meaning is "a group of 10 freedom lovers who start and run everything in friendship". Even though there were only six people, but they also remembered the people involved both in front and behind the scenes of their success. Therefore, a descriptive name of ten is used.

The band's symbol resembles a Sao Chingcha (giant swing) or a Paifang (traditional Chinese arch) owing the band's name is a play on the words of the two English letters T and H.

== Members ==
- Itkron "Jaii" Pungkiatrussamee – vocals, guitar
- Trinnasit "Most" Siripitchayasan – vocals, guitar
- Pannasit "Min" Sukahotu – guitar solo
- Thanakit "J" Songmuang – keyboard
- Jatsada "Jat" Panya – bass guitar
- Patanapoom "Tuke" Chaumpol – drums

== Discography ==
=== Studio albums ===
- TaitosmitH (ไททศมิตร; 2019)
- Phuea Chiwit Ku (เพื่อชีวิตกู; 2022)

=== Special album ===
- TaitosmitH Special Boxset (limited edition; 2021)

== Original soundtrack ==
Year	Thai title	Translate	For	Notes
2020	Yu-Titum (ยุติ-ธรรม)	"Justice"	Nemesis	
2021	Nak Leng Kao (นักเลงเก่า)	"Former Gangster"	4 Kings	feat D Gerrard
2021	Mung Kub Ku (มึงกับกู)	"You & I"	4 Kings	solo by Jaii

== See also ==
- Music of Thailand
- Phleng phuea chiwit
