= Sawasdee Bangkok =

- Thai: สวัสดีบางกอก, เสน่ห์กรุงเทพ
- Directed by: Bhandit Rittakol; Wisit Sasanatieng; Prachya Pinkaew; Rutaiwan Wongsirasawad; Pen-Ek Ratanaruang; Aditya Assarat; Santi Taepanich; Chookiat Sakveerakul; Kongdej Jaturanrasamee
- Produced by: BMA; Thai PBS
- Starring: Supakorn Kitsuwon; Sine Jaroenpura; Bongkoj Khongmalai; Tanthai Prasertkul; Arak Amornsupasiri; Winai Bandurak; Nopachai Jayanama; Ploy Horwang; Louis Scott; Ananda Everingham; Tharatip Sridee; Jenjira Jamniansri; Namo Tongkumnerd
- Distributed by: Thai PBS
- Release date: July 2009 (Bangkok Film Festival)
- Country: Thailand
- Language: Thai

Sawasdee Bangkok (Thai: สวัสดีบางกอก, เสน่ห์กรุงเทพ, lit. 'Hello Bangkok, Charming Bangkok') is a 2009 Thai omnibus film directed by nine directors produced by Bangkok Metropolitan Administration (BMA) and Thai PBS. The story about lifestyles of people in Bangkok, it is divided into nine segments.

== Summary ==
Title	Actor, Actress	Director	Plot
มาหานคร (Maha Nakhon; "Coming to the city")	Supakorn Kitsuwon, Sine Jaroenpura	Bhandit Rittakol	Sonn an Ang Thong farmer won on the last two numbers in a lottery. He traveling to Bangkok for the first time with his wife Mai in hopes to photograph the Wat Phra Kaew. They have gone to many places where people say that it is a real landmark of Bangkok. But finally he and his wife met the true meaning of the word "Bangkok".
ทัศนา (Tussana; "Visually")	Bongkoj Khongmalai, Tanthai Prasertkul	Wisit Sasanatieng	Na the blind girl earns a living selling a lottery under the bridge. She desperately wants to see. Until one day, she met the angel who acted like her eyes.
กรุงเทพมหาเสน่ห์ (Krungthep Mahasane; "Charming Bangkok"	–	Prachya Pinkaew	Mockumentary film present the story of the diverse lifestyles of people in Bangkok with humor and satire.
หลงแต่ไม่ลืม (Long Tae Mai Luam; "Lost but not forgotten")	Arak Amornsupasiri, Winai Bandurak	Rutaiwan Wongsirasawad	Aed a retired musician aged over 60 traveling by bus. He met a young musician on the bus and lost to the Woeng Nakhon Khasem. Where his memories in the old days come back again.
Silence	Nopachai Jayanama, Ploy Horwang	Pen-Ek Ratanaruang	Teenage girl going out to a nightclub. It happened that her car was broken down. She can not repair it. She faced a dumb looking horrible, she scared and expelled him, but he refused to go. Eventually, she meets the truth that makes her feel guilty.
Bangkok Blues	Louis Scott, Ananda Everingham	Aditya Assarat	Two young men are friends. One is upset because his girlfriend broke up. They invite another one to follow. The other one likes to sound record the events that occur at different times.
กรุงเทพที่รัก (Krungthep Theerak; "Bangkok my love")	–	Santi Taepanich	Documentary film interviews of people in Bangkok from monks to kathoeys.
พี่-น้อง (Phi-Nong; "Sisters")	Tharatip Sridee; Jenjira Jamniansri	Chookiat Sakveerakul	Urn a young girl in junior high school there is secretly jealous towards Ann her older sister, who is a beautiful gymnast of school. Ann is a perfect girl. Urn tried to do everything possible to find a weakness that could have been her sister's failure, and when Ann is about to have a boyfriend. Urn tried to destroy, but then she found out. Indeed, her sister including parents love her more than anything.
ผีมะขาม (Phi Makham; "Tamarind ghost" (Note: "Phi Makham" ("tamarind ghost") is a Thai slang term that means "street prostitution", especially those who are looking for tricks in Sanam Luang and the neighbourhood Ratchadamnoen.))	Namo Tongkumnerd	Kongdej Jaturanrasamee	A young man has slept with a prostitute at the shabby motel, he and she talked. Along with walking from Sanam Luang to Ratchadamnoen Avenue at night there, she told her story to him. Finally, he is not sure whether she is a human or a ghost.

== Release ==
- The film premiered during the 7th Bangkok International Film Festival (September 24–30, 2009).
- The film showed during the 9th Toronto International Film Festival.
- The film aired on Thai PBS in mid-2010 on at 08:25pm every Monday night. After the aired, there will be an interview with the production team, the director and the cast.
