= Slice (2009 film) =

- Film poster
- เฉือน
- Directed by: Kongkiat Komesiri
- Written by: Kongkiat Komesiri; Wisit Sasanatieng
- Produced by: Kiatkamon Iamphungporn; Aphiradee Iamphungphorn (Co); Tipwarin Nildum (Co)
- Starring: Chatchai Plengpanich; Arak Amornsupasiri
- Cinematography: Thanachart Boonla
- Edited by: Sunit Asavinikul; Phannipha Kabillikavanich; Muanfun Uppathum
- Music by: Wild at Heart; Van!lla Sky (Sound designer)
- Distributed by: Five Star Production
- Release date: 22 October 2009
- Running time: 99 minutes
- Country: Thailand
- Language: Thai
- Box office: More than 6 million baht

Slice (Thai: เฉือน, RTGS: Chuean) is a Thai crime-horror film directed by Kongkiat Komesiri. The film premiered on 22 October 2009.

== Plot ==
Tai, a first-class prisoner and former hired killer, has changed his mind. He tries to tell Shin, the police officer who uses him for secret work, about his suspicions that he knows who the murderer is. But Shin doesn't listen. When another horrifying incident happens to the minister's son, the police must try every way to catch the murderer and punish him. The police remove Tai from prison. They make a bargain. Tai asks for his release without conditions and freedom to do everything. Within 15 days, he must bring the murderer to justice. The police hold his wife hostage. If he doesn't return with the murderer, they will kill her immediately. Tai traces his memories from the past, and the truth from the past begins to become clearer. A professional murderer and a serial killer are inevitably destined to face each other. What is the conclusion of the murder?

== Cast ==
- Chatchai Plengpanich as Papa Chin
- Arak Amornsupasiri as Tai
- Sikarin Satesuraprecha as Tai (Child)
- Atthaphan Phunsawat as Nut Boonla
- Jessica Pasaphan as Noii
- Sonthaya Chitmanee as Sergent Lami

== Reception ==
The film received mostly positive reviews, grossing just 2.6 million baht in its first week of release. The total income was more than 6 million baht.

== Soundtrack ==
- "ฝันร้าย" by Sky Band
