= Marsha Vadhanapanich =

Thai singer and model

- มาช่า วัฒนพานิช
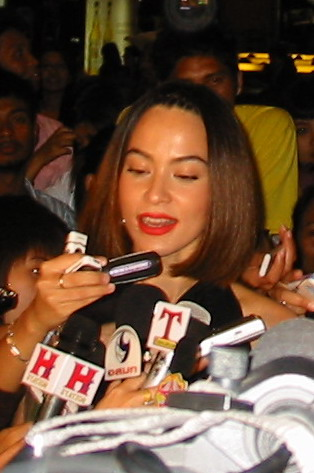
- Marsha in 2007
- Born: Marion Ursula Marsha Vadhanapanich; 24 August 1970 (age 56); Iserlohn, West Germany
- Other names: Pim Vadhanapanich; Sayomporn Vadhanapanich; Thanattha Vadhanapanich; Khanasorn Vadhanapanich
- Years active: 1985–present
- Known for: Alone (2007); Phobia 2 (2009); Kwa Ja Roo Dieng Sa (1987); The Face Thailand (2017)
- Spouse: Amphol Lumpoon (m. 1988; div. 1997)
- Children: 1
- Website: Official website

Marion Ursula Marsha Vadhanapanich (Thai: มาช่า วัฒนพานิช; RTGS: Macha Watthanaphanit; born 24 August 1970) is a Thai singer, model and actress. She is widely recognized as one of the most beautiful artists and actresses in Thailand, with a successful career in the entertainment industry spanning over 40 years. Currently, she is ranked as one of Thailand's most famous public figures and remains one of the best-selling female singers in the country.

== Early life and education ==
Vadhanapanich was born in West Germany to a Thai Chinese father and a German mother. In 1986, Vadhanapanich graduated from Benjamarachalai School while already in the entertainment industry. Following high school, she received a degree from Assumption University.

Marsha registered her marriage to Amphol Lampoon, the lead singer of the well-known band Micro, around 1988 after a brief hiatus from the entertainment industry. The couple has one son, Chaithat Wattanapanich, nicknamed Guy. They later divorced in 1997.

== Selected filmography ==
Films

- Tamruat lek (1986)
- Rak noi na (1986)
- Wanali (1986)
- Chip (1986)
- Phet sian thong (1987)
- Wai priao puek puek (1987)
- Om kot satan (1987)
- Kwa Ja Roo Dieng Sa (1987)
- Tawan phloeng (1987)
- Fa si thong (1987)
- Wun thisut ... sadut rak (1987)
- Pisat si ngoen (1988)
- Jong rak (1988)
- Phetchakhat si chomphu (1988)
- Wiwa chamlaeng (1988)
- Ichu ku pu pa (1988)
- Ma (1989)
- Alone (2007)
- Phobia 2 (2009)
- Dark Flight (2012)
- Love on the rock (2014)

Television

- Kwa Ja Roo Dieng Sa (1988)
- Yu phuea rak (1989)
- Fai chon saeng (1992)
- Wang nam won (1992)
- Som song saeng (1994)
- Nangsao mai chamkat namsakun (1997)
- Hong nuea mangkon (2000)
- Jao Sao Mue Ar Cheap (2001)
- Sailom Kub Sangdao (2002)
- Boung Ban Ja Thorn (2002)
- Kho phlik fa tam la thoe (2004)
- Che dan ... chan rak thoe (2005)
- Likhit saneha (2011)
- Rock Letter (2017)
- Khun Mae Mafia (2020)
- The Sweetest Taboo (2024)

TV Series

- Spy The Series: 24 Cases Forbidden (Guest appearance, EP.3) (2007)
- Carabao The Series: Welcome to Thailand (2013)
- Diary of Tootsies (Guest appearance) (2016)
- Melodies of Life: Bad Friends (2016)

== Selected television programmes ==
- The Acting Queen (2010)
- The Face Thailand (season 3) (2017)

== Discography ==
Albums under GMM Grammy Public Company Limited.

Solo Albums

Year	Album	Release date	Songs	Sales	Genre
1991	Tham Dao	23 August 1991	Nueay Mai Dao Lok Iang Wela Tang Tua Jap Mai Dai Lai Mai Than Khong Kao Job Trong Ni Duek Laeo Taek Hak Kho Khae Khuen Ni Khao Khon Nan Chao Kang Khen	830,000 albums	Pop, Rock
1993	Rod Chat Kwam Pen Khon	16 June 1993	Khwam Dan (Thu-Rang) Sung (Feat. Amphol Lumpoon) Phit Pai Laeo Reos-Chat Khwam Pen Khon Pai Hai Sa Chai Sia Sun Chot Cham Wai Mai Khao Chai Baeng Pan Yang Ni Mai Khoei Choe Phap Luang Ta	900,000 albums	Pop, Rock
1996	Room Number Three	4 April 1996	Mai Mi Khrai Ya Yom Chan Ploi Chan Pai Banthuek Nai Wan Kao Khao Yang Yu Ro Plaek Mai Plot Ploi Fan Wai Kon Kho Wela	650,000 albums	Pop, Rock, Acoustic
1997	Re-Entry	22 April 1997	Khrai Sak Khon Mai Pen Rai... Khon Di Diao Dai Yu Phuea Khrai Yang Noi Lok Kan Len Loei Bong Bok Bok Rak Ta Kiang La Kon Sanya Pak Plao	610,000 albums	Pop, Acoustic
1999	Maya	17 June 1999	Maya Khon Chai Taek Mu Ma Ka Kai Chan Chueng Luem Ta Klom Ot Chai Mai Wai Hai Wela Chan Wela Kap Khon Song Khon Pho Phiang Ya Loei	700,000 albums	Electro-pop
2001	Fine Days	22 June 2001	Mue Achip Yang Yom Chak Khon Uen Khon Klai Yang Noi Chan Yang Hai Chai Chot Chai Hai Tua Eng Khit Mak Diaw Klum Chai Mai Yak Non Khon Diao Ik Khon Thi Rak Thoe Mai Mi Khwam Hen Khae Dai Rak Chan Mai Rap Phit Chop	750,000 albums	Pop, Acoustic
2003	The River of Life	21 January 2003	Sai Nam Mai Lai Klap Cha Mai Kreng Chai Tham Lok Ni Tong Mi Phu Chai Yang Thoe King Wai Bai Bon Chan Cha Tham Phue Thoe Chan Mai Chai Dok Mai Pen Kiat Koen Pho Phrung Ni Mai Samkhan Phit Pai Ik Laeo	600,000 albums	Easy listening, Pop
2005	In Love	2 December 2005	Music Lover Mai Yak Hai Thoe Wai Chai Fang Hua Chai Tua Eng Khit Kiss Tong Kan Rak Thae In Love Chan Khoei Phit Phlat Ma Don t Do That Chan Pho Chai La Duai Khwam Khao Chai	600,000 albums	Pop
2006	Marsha SELECTION (Special album)	29 August 2006	Chuea Chan Thang Ru Ko Rak Chup Goodbye Song Khao Chai Fak Rak Khae Khuep Chong Rak Khwam Rak Si Dam Phuean Ruam Thang Ni Rak Kwa Cha Rak	No data	Pop-Dance
2007	Let’s Have Fun Tonight	25 September 2007	Rak Yang Mai Tong Kan Rok Phum Phae Phu Chai Huay Huay Fan Klang Khuen Lock Love Party Chuay Phut Noi Het Sut Wisai Ya Mong Na Khao Hua Chai Ten Ram	40,000 albums (Not including downloads)	Electro-dance
2012	Come To Me	26 July 2012	App Story Khao Lue Rue Rueang Ching Chae Sak Wan Khong Dai Choe Come To Me Wan Yut Chot Choei Sia Chai Thi Sut Lok Chan lueak Eng Just Call	20,000 albums (Not including downloads)	Pop

Special Project Albums

- 1993: "Son" Khon Dontree (10th Anniversary of Grammy) (Sept 30, 1993)

Song: Mai Pen Rai Loei (ไม่เป็นไรเลย)

- 1995: Feather and Flowers (Khan Nok Gub Dok Mai) - Thongchai McIntyre (Feb 24, 1995)

Song: Fak Fa Talay Fun (ฝากฟ้าทะเลฝัน)

- 1994/1995: Rock (Z)one (April 20, 1995)

Song: Term Nam Man (เติมน้ำมัน)

- 1999: The Special 4 (Oct 14, 1999)

Songs: Puk Trong Nee (พักตรงนี้), Khwan Fai (ควันไฟ), Khob Jai Jing Jing (ขอบใจจริงๆ)

- 1999: Rock for Life Vol. 1 & 2 (Dec 23, 1999)

Songs: Ngao (เหงา), Yim Ngao Ngao Sao Ngam Ngam (ยิ้มเหงาๆ เศร้างามๆ)

- 2000: Long Oei (Brothers & Sisters Sing Asanee-Wasan) (Jan 18, 2000)

Song: Thong Mai Roo Ron (ทองไม่รู้ร้อน)

- 2000: X-Track 4 (OST. Hong Nuea Mangkorn) (April 2000)

Song: Mai Luea Khrai (ไม่เหลือใคร)

- 2000: Seven (Nov 30, 2000)

Songs: Het Karn Mai Khoey Plian (เหตุการณ์ไม่เคยเปลี่ยน), Hong Nee (ห้องนี้), Klub Ma Ha Phuean (กลับมาหาเพื่อน)

- 2002: X-Track 7 (OST. Sai Lom Gub Saeng Dao) (Feb 2002)

Songs: Chao Khong Chun Khue Ther (เจ้าของฉันคือเธอ), Phror Ther (เพราะเธอ)

- 2004: The Guitar Man (Sept 2004)

Song: The Game of Love

- 2005: Sleepless Society by Narongvit (March 15, 2005)

Song: Mai Lub Mai Non (ไม่หลับไม่นอน)

- 2006: See Fah Deep Blue (Oct 2006)

Song: Ma-Laeng Len Fai (แมลงเล่นไฟ)

- 2007: Alone OST. Alone

Song: Suan Nueng Khong Chun (ส่วนหนึ่งของฉัน)

and more.

== Awards ==
- Saraswati Royal Award (Silver Doll): Best Rising Female Star of 1986, for the film Iron Cop (Tamruat lek).
- Saraswati Royal Award (Golden Doll): Best Actress of 1987, for the film Jong Rak.
- Golden Television Award: Best Actress of 1992, for the drama series Fai Chon Saeng.
- Golden Television Award: Best Actress of 2000, for the drama series Hong Nuea Mangkon.
- Suphannahong National Film Award: Best Actress of 2007, for the film Alone.
- Fantastic Fest 2007: Best Actress, for the film Alone.
- The New York City Horror Film Festival 2008 (USA): Best Actress, for the film Alone.

and more.

== Selected concerts ==
=== Solo Concerts ===
- Marsha Marshow (1991) at MBK Hall
- Marsha Tastes (1993) at MBK Hall
- Masha with Special Person Presented by LUX (2000) at MCC Hall
- One Fine Day With Marsha (2001) at Chatuchak Park
- Marsha My Reflection (2004) at Impact Arena
- Marsha Open Heart (2006) at Impact Arena

=== Collaboration Concerts ===
- Seven Live In Bangkok
- Sleepless Society Concert
- This Is It Concert (Tribute to Michael Jackson)
- Green Concert # 16 Seven Return
- The Friendship concert
- The Masterpiece concert
- Feather and Flowers : the original return
- AmpSha concert
- The lyrics of love : greatest hits of Dee & Boyd
- GRAMMY X RS : 90's Versary Concert
- Cassette Fest mega hits

and more.
