= Dark Flight =

- Thai poster
- Directed by: Issara Nadee
- Written by: Kongkiat Khomsiri; Nattapot Potchumnean; Chanin Panthong; Nattamol Peathanom
- Produced by: Kiatkamon Iamphungporn; Aphiradee Iamphungporn; Tipwarin Nildum
- Starring: Marsha Vadhanapanich; Peter Knight; Patcharee Tubthong
- Cinematography: Chatchai Kusonsinchai; Panom Promchat
- Edited by: Sunit Asvinikul; Phannipha Kabillikavanich
- Music by: Ratthakorn Komol; Vanilla Sky
- Production company: Five Star Production
- Distributed by: Vicol Entertainment
- Release date: 22 March 2012 (Thailand)
- Running time: 105 minutes
- Country: Thailand
- Language: Thai
- Box office: $2,007,612

Dark Flight (Thai: 407 เที่ยวบินผี) is a 2012 Thai horror film. The film was directed by Issara Nadee. It shows the journey of a passenger plane haunted by ghosts that gradually trick the passengers into going insane and killing each other.

== Plot ==
Ten years ago, flight SA-407 had supernatural occurrences leading to the death of all passengers leaving one flight attendant, New, unharmed by closing her eyes until the plane landed.

At present time, the plane SA-407 had been repainted and made anew. A family, including Gift, Phen and Jamras, a tourist Ann, her admirer Wave, a couple John and Michelle, a flight attendant Prince, and an engineer of flight, Bank, a monk, an old woman and a pervert American and two other lady attendants and a pilot with the captain board the plane.

Oxygen in the plane started to lower and Bank is forced to go to fix it in the cargo hold. The old woman dies in the process. Bank informs New of a possible short-circuit and starts repairing the oxygen pressurizer. New almost collapses in the process, before she is safely brought to the top by Bank. Strange things start to occur from dead bodies disappearing, to possessed passengers killing each other until Gift, Jamras, Phen, Bank and New are the only ones left. Phen is possessed and strangles New but a cart rolls and kills Phen with forks. Bank and Jamras drive and land the plane safely. Multiple times, during the oxygen-run, Phen had uttered against New, telling that she is the root to every paranormal activity on the airplane, but she was suppressed by Jamras and Gift. At the ambulance, Gift asks where New is and Bank sees her soul in the plane. It just shows that she died with Phen and it all happened because 10 years ago, New only saved herself and did not help the others, thus the spirits wanted to avenge themselves. The film ends when the plane is scheduled to be repainted again and New's spirit is seen sitting inside the plane.

== Cast ==
- Marsha Wattanapanich as New
- Peter Knight as Bank
- Paramej Noiam as Jamras
- Patcharee Tubthong as Gift
- Anchalee Hassadeevichit as Phen
- Thiti Vechabul as Prince
- Namo Tongkumnerd as Wave
- Sisangian Sihalath as Ann
- Jonathan Samson as John
- Kristen Evelyn Rossi as Michelle

== Production ==
The film's 3D was handled by the Hong Kong company Digital Magic, which made it the first Thai film shot in 3D.

== Release ==
The film has also been sold to Encore Films for Hong Kong, Deepjoy Picture Corporation for Taiwan, Clover Films for Singapore and Malaysia, PT Inter Solusindo Film for Indonesia and Filmworks for Cambodia. The film was released in Thailand on 22 March 2012. On its first weekend in Thailand, Dark Flight was the second-highest-grossing feature in Thailand, only being beaten by The Hunger Games. The film grossed a total of $1,133,343 in Thailand and $2,007,612 worldwide.
