= Alone (2007 film) =

2007 Thai film by Banjong Pisanthanakun & Parkpoom Wongpoom

- Theatrical release poster
- Directed by: Banjong Pisanthanakun; Parkpoom Wongpoom
- Screenplay by: Banjong Pisanthanakun; Sophon Sakdaphisit; Parkpoom Wongpoom; Aummaraporn Phandintong
- Produced by: Yongyoot Thongkongtoon; Yodphet Sudsawad; Mingmongkol Sonakul
- Starring: Marsha Vadhanapanich
- Cinematography: Niramon Ross
- Edited by: Thammarat Sumetsupachok; Vijjapat Kojew
- Music by: Chatchai Pongprapaphan
- Distributed by: GTH; 24 Frames
- Release date: 29 March 2007 (Thailand)
- Running time: 95 minutes
- Country: Thailand
- Languages: Thai; Korean
- Box office: $9.3 million

Alone (Thai: แฝด, or Fad, literally "Twin") is a 2007 Thai horror film written and directed by Banjong Pisanthanakun and Parkpoom Wongpoom. Alone stars Thai-German pop singer Marsha Vadhanapanich in her first film role in 15 years.

== Plot ==
Pim and Ploy are twin sisters both conjoined at the stomach. Pim is very sweet, caring, and protective, especially of Ploy, though Ploy's nature is generally harsh and cold. The girls have a very close bond and promise each other to stay together until they die.

While they are staying in a hospital, Pim and Ploy meet a boy named Wee. The girls display mutual affection for him, but Wee only confesses his love for Pim, provoking Ploy's jealousy. After his recovery from an illness, Wee decides that he wants to see Pim one last time before leaving the hospital and visiting the twins' room. As much as Pim wants to see Wee, Ploy refuses to get out of bed in an apparent jealous rage. As Wee gets upset and leaves, Pim, filled with anger and sadness over Ploy's jealousy, demands that she and Ploy be separated. To do so, the twins undergo surgery, which Ploy does not survive. Pim burdens herself with guilt, thinking that if she had not wanted an operation, Ploy would still be alive.

Years later, Pim has married Wee, and the couple live in South Korea. She receives a phone call from Thailand that her mother has had a stroke. When Pim and Wee return to Thailand, a series of strange events begin to happen, and Pim believes that the ghost of Ploy is behind them all. When she tells Wee her theory, he becomes very worried and starts seeking psychiatric help for Pim. But even after the psychiatrist comes to visit Pim, she still experiences the hauntings and what Wee believes to be hallucinations. The hauntings escalate from moving objects and voices to Pim coming in contact with Ploy; Pim hears her breathing on her side while she sleeps, she sees Ploy in the mirror instead of herself, while on an elevator she sees Ploy resting her head on her shoulder, and is nearly drowned by Ploy while taking a bath. Pim feels incredibly guilty and becomes a recluse, with Wee not being very sure about what is wrong with her. However, Ploy's ghost then begins haunting Wee as well.

One night, Wee goes to see Pim's mother, who reveals that Pim is actually Ploy. After Pim had demanded they be separated, Ploy strangled her out of jealousy, unintentionally killing her. But when Pim died, Ploy suddenly snapped out of her rage, shocked at what she did, and screamed for help from her mother, who was devastated by Pim's death and never spoke to her again. To save Ploy's life, doctors had to separate Pim's corpse from Ploy's body. Ploy assumed Pim's identity to get together with Wee, and it was Pim's ghost that was haunting him and her. Ploy's mother was fully aware of her actions as well but kept silent. Later, Ploy kills her mother by disconnecting her oxygen pipe to stop her from telling Wee the truth, unaware that her mother had told Wee the truth beforehand.

Wee confronts Ploy, and in a moment of guilt, she confesses. Shocked and disgusted at Ploy's actions, Wee decides to leave her, but Ploy knocks him unconscious and takes him hostage. However, Wee escapes, and the ensuing fight with Ploy breaks out, causing the house to catch fire. Wee throws a shelf on Ploy and escapes. Trapped underneath, Pim's ghost confronts and holds Ploy down, and as the burning debris rains down around them, Pim smiles, and Ploy dies.

Wee visits the twins' grave and takes out Pim's necklace that he had given her as a gift when they were in the hospital. He places it on their tombstone.

== Cast ==
- Marsha Vadhanapanich in a dual role as Pim and Ploy
  - Hatairat Egereff as Pim, age 15
  - Rutairat Egereff as Ploy, age 15
  - Chutikan Vimuktananda as Pim, age 7
  - Chayakan Vimuktananda as Ploy, age 7
- Vittaya Wasukraipaisan as Wee
  - Namo Tongkumnerd as Wee, age 15
- Ruchanu Boonchooduang as Pim's and Ploy's mother
- Joel Piercey as Ryang

== Box office ==
Like Pisanthanakun and Wongpoom's previous film Shutter, Alone opened at #1 at the Thai Box Office grossing $960,000 before falling to #2 grossing $411,043. In total the film grossed $2,040,003 in Thailand becoming the 21st highest grossing film of the year. The film fared even better internationally grossing $9,365,071 worldwide out grossing the directors which made all other movies fall behind previous film Shutter.

== Festivals and awards ==
Since its general release in Thailand cinemas, Alone has made the rounds at film festivals, playing at the 2007 Bangkok International Film Festival. At Fantastic Fest in Austin, Texas, the film won awards for best director and best actress. It swept the awards at the 2007 Screamfest Horror Film Festival in Los Angeles, winning Best Picture, Best Director, Best Cinematography and Best Editing. The film also won the top Audience Award for Best Feature Film at the 2007 Toronto After Dark festival.

== Soundtrack ==
The closing credits feature a song by Marsha Wattanapanich, "Suan Neung Khong Chan (A Part of Me)".

== DVD release ==
Alone has been released on Region 3 DVD in Hong Kong by Asia Video, with the original soundtrack and English and Traditional Chinese subtitles.

== Remakes ==
Alone has been remade 7 times, 6 in Indian languages:

- The 2007 Indian Malayalam film Nadiya Kollappetta Rathri was inspired from this film where Kavya Madhavan played the twins.
- Chaarulatha (2012) made in Kannada and Tamil languages. Priyamani played the conjoined twins.
- Geethaanjali (2013), a Malayalam film, was made after the producers bought the rights to remake it. Keerthy Suresh played the twin roles in this film. Although Geethaanjali was a remake, it was promoted as a spin-off of the 1993 Malayalam film Manichitrathazhu.
- Alone (2015), made in Hindi language. Bipasha Basu played the twins.
- Vaigai Express (2017) a Tamil Language film, was a remake of Malayalam film Nadiya Kollappetta Rathri which itself was loosely based on this film. Nitu Chandra played the twins.
- Bhool Bhulaiyaa 2 (2022) made in Hindi language was loosely based on the Malayalam film Geethaanjali(which itself was based on this film) where Tabu played the twins. It is a standalone sequel to the 2007 film Bhool Bhulaiyaa, which was a remake of 1993 Malayalam film Manichitrathazhu.
- The 2012 Filipino film Guni-Guni has been described as having similarities in plot to Alone, where Lovi Poe played the role of the twins.

== See also ==
- List of ghost films
