= Monkey Twins =

2018 Thai-language television series

- Genre: Action adventure crime
- Created by: Nontakorn Taweesuk
- Starring: Phakhin Khamwilaisak; Alisa Kunkwaeng; Akkarat Nimitchai
- Country of origin: Thailand
- Original language: Thai
- No. of seasons: 1
- No. of episodes: 13

Production
- Running time: 60 minutes

Original release
- Network: One 31
- Release: June 2 – September 1, 2018

Monkey Twins (Thai: วายุเทพยุทธ์) is a 2018 Thai-language television series created by Nontakorn Taweesuk and starring Phakhin Khamwilaisak, Alisa Kunkwaeng and Akkarat Nimitchai. The plot revolves around a cop teaming up with a martial artist to infiltrate an organized crime ring of drug dealers and corruption within the legal system.

It was released from June 2 to September 1, 2018, by One 31.

The series was distributed by Netflix between 2018 and 2022.

== Cast ==
=== Main cast ===
- Phakin Khamwilaisak as Mawin
- Samrej Muuengbudh as Neur
- Alisa Kunkwaeng as Namtarn
- Akkarat Nimitchai as Taycho
- Zozeen Panyanut Jirarottanakasem as Lin-in
- Yanin Vismitananda as Tamako
- Dan Chupong as Saming
- Prasat Thong-Aram as Grandpa Kla
- Warawut Phoyim as Puek
- Pichaya Tippala as Aom
- Athiwat Sanitwong na Ayuddhaya as Chanchai
- David Asavanond as Dej
- Amphan Charoensukraph as Meng
- Prab Yuttapichai as Ekkachai
- Jirawat Wachirasarunpat as Yamoto
- Saicheer Wongwirot as Chia

=== Recurring cast ===
- Sillapin Thong-Aram as Yim
- Glot Atthaseri as Phong
- Nattapat Wipatdejtrakul as Mei-Fern
- Wittaya Pansri-ngam

=== Guest ===
- Ariyakorn Bowornwitsarut as Lin
- Somboon Likitsatianchai
- Meng Po Pla Group
- Lingprakit Sitprakan's Monkey circus Group

== Release ==
Monkey Twins was released between June 2, 2018, and September 1, 2018, on GMM One.
