= Chatchai Plengpanich =

Thai actor (born 1960)

- ฉัตรชัย เปล่งพานิช
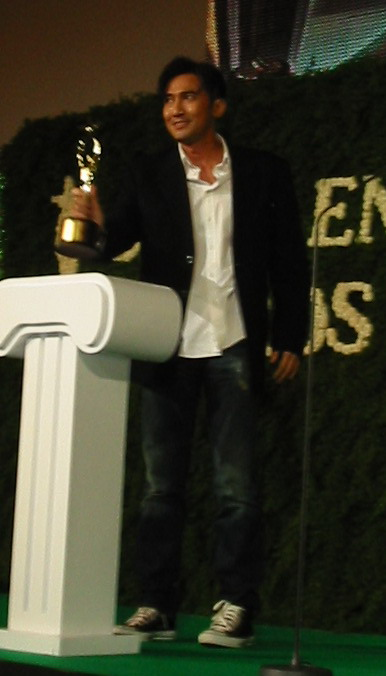
- Chatchai Plengpanich in 2008
- Born: January 17, 1960 (age 66); Kanchanaburi, Thailand
- Education: Faculty of Social Sciences, Kasetsart University
- Occupation: Actor
- Years active: 1981–present
- Height: 1.78 m (5 ft 10 in)
- Spouse: Sinjai Hongtai (m. 1988)
- Children: 3
- Awards: Thailand National Film Awards; 2005 – Best Actor, Necromancer; Bangkok Critics Assembly; 2005 – Best Actor, Hit Man File
- Website: Official website

Chatchai Plengpanich (Thai: ฉัตรชัย เปล่งพานิช, RTGS: Chatchai Plengphanit; born January 17, 1960) is a Thai film and television actor. He has appeared in many lakorns (Thai soap operas) and feature films.

== Biography ==
Chatchai was born in Kanchanaburi Province. Having a police officer as a father meant that the family relocated around Thailand constantly throughout his childhood. He attended a prestigious boarding school in Nakhon Pathom (King's College), where he found his passion for rugby.

He became widely known for playing the role of Tee Yai, a real robber in the late '70s. Tee Yai's story was adapted into a TV drama in same name on Channel 5 in 1985.

He met his wife, Sinjai Plengpanich, on a movie set, in which they played the lead characters. They had many chance encounters during the next four years and decided to date each other. A year later, they decided to get married. They have three children.

== Awards and nominations ==
- Winner, best actor, Hit Man File, Bangkok Critics Assembly, 2005
- Winner, best actor, Necromancer, Thailand National Film Awards, 2005
- Nominee, best actor, Hit Man File, Thailand National Film Awards, 2005

== Trivia ==
- Shares the same nickname with wife. Both are called Nok (translated as bird in English)
- Has been credited on many sites as a voice actor in the film Over the Hedge, for an unnamed character. Despite this, he is not listed under any position in the official credits, nor is his voice recognized anywhere in the film. Why he is being referenced to the film is unknown at this time.
- In the 1980s, when he became famous as a lead actor in many lakorns and films, he often played very different roles. Sometimes he was a killer or a criminal in action and crime stories. Other times he played a kind-hearted gentleman. He said that back then he had fans who were both truck drivers and young women.
- Even though he was primarily known as an actor, in the late 1980s and early 1990s he was also a singer, having released three studio albums under the major label RS Promotion. He also performed a theme song for the Channel 3 drama Prisana in 1987, which marked the breakthrough of actress Lalita Panyopas.

== Partial filmography ==
=== Actor ===
==== Films ====
- The Last Shot as Somjit (2025)
- Slice as Papa Chin (2009)
- Vow of Death (Phii mai jim fun) (2007)
- King Naresuan (2007)
- Jom kha mung wej (Necromancer) (2005)
- Sum muepuen (Hit Man File) (2005)
- Zee-Oui (2004)
- Taloompuk (2002)
- The Legend of Suriyothai (2001)
- Satang (2000)
- Fah (1998)
- The Hunter (1995)
- Salween (1993)
- Tawipob (1990)
- Song for Chao Phraya (1990)
- Tawan Deard (1989)
- Cannibal Mercenary (1988)
- Sarawat Teuan (1987)
- Zombie Human (1987)
- Ball Bearings (1986)
- Young Eagle (1986)
- Oh Tee (1986)
- Terminal Angels (1986)
- Death Ring (1985)
- Katanyu Prakasit (1983)
- Sai Sawat Yang Mai Sin (1982)
- Raya (1981)

==== Drama TVB ====
- Split Second (爭分奪秒) (2004) - Hong Kong Cantonese TVB television series with Sririta Jensen as "Sam"

==== Lakorns ====
- The Last Duel (2026)
- Bangkok Blossom (2024)
- Eclipse of the Heart (2023)
- Game of Outlaws (2021)
- Chat Phayak (2016)
- Nuer Mek 2 (2012) - with Sinjai Plengpanich
- Tawan Deard (2011) - with Sinjai Plengpanich
- Koung Jak Rai Dok Bua (2007)
- Sapai Part-time (2006)
- Jao Sao Prissana (1999) - with Anne Thongprasom
- Reun Mayura (1997) - with Kathaleeya McIntosh
- Rom Chat (1995) - with Sinjai Plengpanich
- Nai Fun (1992) - with Sinjai Plengpanich
- Si Paen Din (1991) - with Chintara Sukapatana
- Katanyu Prakasit (1990) - with Sinjai Plengpanich
- Tae Pang Korn (1987) - with Jariya Anfone
- Sarawat Teuan (1987)
- Prisana (1987) - with Lalita Panyopas
- Death on The Nile (1986)
- Sai Lohit (1986)
- Tee Yai (1985)
- Rai Sanae-ha (1985)
- Condominium (1984)

=== Director ===
- Game of Outlaws (2021)
- Tawan Deard (2011)
- Khun Chai Ronapee (2012)
- Kum mun sanya (1993)
- Jaiphisut (2024)

=== Producer ===
Producer
Year	Title	Cast	Network
2011	Tawan Deard	Prin Suparat, Urassaya Sperbund, Chalida Vijitvongthong, Tanavat Vatthanaputi	Channel 3
2012	Nuer Mek 2	Prin Suparat, Chalida Vijitvongthong	Channel 3
2013	Khun Chai Ronapee	James Ma, Chalida Vijitvongthong	Channel 3
2024	Jaiphisut	Eisaya Heosuwan, Tate Myron	Channel 3

=== Awards and nominations ===
Awards and Nominations
Year	Award	Category	Nominated work	Result
2010	Top Awards	Best Supporting Actor in a Lakorn	Mongkut Dok Som	Nominated
