= Fah (film) =

Fah (Thai: ฟ้า) is a 1998 Thai action film directed by Wych Kaosayananda, produced by Arunosha Panupan and starring Sunisa Jett, Johnny Anfone, Don Theerathada, and Chatchai Plengpanich. The film was claimed to be the most expensive Thai film at the time with a budget of 22 million baht (US$960,000).

== Plot ==
Rick (Don Theerathada), a young police officer who has just completed FBI training in the United States and is skilled in martial arts, is forced to team up with a middle-aged officer (Chatchai Plengpanich) who still relies on old-school methods. Together, they must track down a gang of eight daring robbers who have stolen a priceless diamond. The gang's leader (Johnny Anfone) and his subordinates are known for their impeccably sharp attire. Meanwhile, Rick's fiancée, Fah (Sunisa Jett), who is newly pregnant, is taken hostage.

== Behind the scenes and criticism ==
Fah was the directorial debut of Wych Kaosayananda, a young Thai filmmaker who studied film in the United States and had experience working in Hollywood. At the time, Witch was only 24 years old.

The film also marked the acting debut of Sunisa Jett, who later became a well-known actress under Channel 3. Don Theerathada, a young actor skilled in Taekwondo, played the lead role, alongside famous actors such as Chatchai Plengpanich, Johnny Anfone, and supporting actors like Krirk Schiller and Kanchanaporn Plotpai, who portrayed a high-ranking female police officer.

However, upon its release, Fah received overwhelmingly negative reviews. Critics acknowledged the film's attempt to break away from the traditional Thai cop-vs-criminal genre by making the villains appear more stylish and attractive than the police and incorporating innovative camera angles. However, the screenplay, written by Witch himself, was heavily criticized for being weak, with characters frequently acting illogically and inconsistently. The editing was also poorly executed, and the number of villains was deemed excessive. Additionally, the story lacked depth, with critics suggesting that its core plot could have been resolved within 30 minutes rather than being stretched to nearly two hours. Another major issue was the lead actor's unclear Thai pronunciation, which unintentionally turned the film into a comedy whenever he spoke.

On IMDb, the film received a low rating of just 3.6 out of 10.

Years later, Witch directed the Hollywood action film Ballistic: Ecks vs. Sever, which was also met with harsh criticism. It was widely regarded as the worst film of the year by international critics and was later even named one of the worst films of the decade.
