= Game of Outlaws =

Thai thriller-action-crime drama

- Genre: Action, Thriller, Crime, Drama
- Written by: Chatchai Plengpanich
- Directed by: Chatchai Plengpanich
- Starring: Prin Suparat and Natapohn Tameeruks
- Country of origin: Thailand
- Original language: Thai
- No. of episodes: 19

Production
- Producer: Chatchai Plengpanich
- Running time: 120 minutes
- Production companies: Metta & Mahaniyom

Original release
- Network: Channel 3
- Release: October 28 – December 30, 2021

Game of Outlaws (Thai: เกมล่าทรชน, RTGS: Kem La Thorachon) is a Thai thriller-action-crime drama based on the drama Prajan Lai Payak (พระจันทร์ลายพยัคฆ์).

The story was written and directed by Nok Chatchai Plengpanich under the banner of his production company "Metta & Mahaniyom Co. Ltd." It airs on Channel 3 from 20:30 to 22:30. It airs from 28 October 2021 to 30 December 2021. It also airs on Netflix in 10 countries: Laos, Cambodia, Myanmar, Vietnam, the Philippines, Indonesia, Brunei, Singapore, Malaysia, and Timor-Leste.

== Premise ==
The story centers around Janenaree and Lalisa, two sisters who set out to become cops in order to avenge their father's murder. Janenaree was adopted to be Lalisa's sister due to her father dying while fighting criminals. They therefore enter the agency of Inspector Non who is following Sakda's case. However, in an unfortunate incident, due to anger from Sakda's taunting, Janenaree accidentally kills Sakda and is imprisoned. While in prison, their mother died. Lalisa was furious at Janenaree that it causes a fracturing of relations between the two sisters. While Janenaree was in Jail, she was scouted by Commander Pim to fight the drug dealers. Janenaree became a subordinate to Sakda's half-brother Mawin after her release from jail. However, her mission was a secret and this created more misunderstandings between Janenaree and Lalisa. A pounding war ensues.

== Cast ==
Characters
| Main characters | Played by |
|---|---|
| Non Wongdecha (Inspector Non) นนท์ วงศ์เดชา (สารวัตรนนท์) | Prin Suparat ปริญ สุภารัตน์ |
| Janenaree Kitworakul (Lieutenant Jane) เจนนรี กิจวรกุล (หมวดเจน) | Natapohn Tameeruks ณฐพร เตมีรักษ์ |
| Mawin Ruangsuradecha มาวิน เรืองสุรเดชา | Jaron Sorat จรณ โสรัตน์ |
| Lalisa Phattarapreecha (Lieutenant Lisa) ลลิสา ภัทรปรีชา (หมวดลิสา) | Pimpawee Kograbin พิมพ์ปวีณ์ โคกระบินทร์ |
| Anya Ruangsuradecha อัญญา เรืองสุรเดชา | Kornnaphat Sethratanapong กรณ์นภัส เศรษฐรัตนพงศ์ |
| Rawee Phattarapreecha รวี ภัทรปรีชา | Noraphat Thitakawin นรภัท ฐิตะกวิน |
| Supporting characters | Played by |
| Khajorn (Commander Khajorn) ขจร (ผู้การขจร) | Chatchai Plengpanich ฉัตรชัย เปล่งพานิช |
| Wichan Sirikityothin (Boss) ส.ส.วิชาญ ศิริกิจโยธิน (บอส) | Chatayodom Hiranyatithi ชาตโยดม หิรัณยัษฐิติ |
| Sanchai Leidwiriya () สัณชัย เลิศวิริยะ () | Anuwat Niwaswong อนุวัฒน์ นิวาตวงศ์ |
| Songklod () ทรงกลด () | Saranyoo Prachakrit ศรัณยู ประชากริช |
| Jornkwan () จอมขวัญ () | Jackie Jacqueline Muench แจ็คกี้ ชาเคอลีน มึ้นช์ |
| Leo () สิงห์ เมืองนนท์ () | Patthanapol Minthakin พัฒนพล กุญชร ณ อยุธยา |
| Phongsatorn () ผู้กองพงศธร () | Pidsanu Nimsakul พิษณุ นิ่มสกุล |
| Chat () จ่าชาติ () | Sonthaya Chitmanee สนธยา ชิตมณี |
| Rita () ริต้า () | Boonyisa Chantrarachai บุญยิสา จันทราราชัย |
| Kharon () จ่าคำรณ () | Techin Pinchatree เตชินท์ ปิ่นชาตรี |
| Tong () โต้ง () | Supachai Suwanon ศุภชัย สุวรรณอ่อน |
| Pakorn () จ่าปกรณ์ () | Rachanat Kampanatsanyakorn รัชนาท กัมปนาทแสนยากร |
| Worawat () ร้อยเอก วรวัฒน์ () | Kittitat Pradab กิตติธัช ประดับ |
| Chain () เชนทร์ () | Suparat Meepreecha ศุภรัตน์ มีปรีชา |
| Nong () หน่อง () | Tawan Nounnukul ตะวัลย์ นวนนุกุล |
| Peach () พีท () | Wasuthon Phanphanit วสุธร พันธุ์พาณิชย์ |
| Wi () วิ () | วรินทร์วรดี ทองสุทธิรุจรวี |
| Aon () อ้น () | พนัชษ์กรณ์ ฤกษ์ศิริอารี |
| Lalisa (young) ลลิสา (วัยด็ก) | ด.ญ.บลายณดา เจริญระบิน |
| Janenaree (young) เจนนรี (วัยเด็ก) | ด.ญ.แค็ทเทอร์รีน จันทรวิสูตร |
| Guest characters | Played by |
| Krittiya Khongkhwamdee (Phin) กฤติยา คงความดี (พิณ) | Sinjai Plengpanich สินจัย เปล่งพานิช |
| Sakda Reingsuradech () ศักดา เรืองสุรเดชา () | Sahajak Boonthanakit สหจักร บุญธนกิจ |
| Pa Yai () ป้าใหญ่ () | Narin N Bangchang นรินทร ณ บางช้าง |
| Nuankwan Patpreecha (Nuan) นวลขวัญ ภัทรปรีชา (นวล) () | Khwanruedi Klomklom ขวัญฤดี กลมกล่อม |
| Yut () ยุทธ () | Rungrit Witsamon เรืองฤทธิ์ วิศมล |
| Sarin () หมวดสาริน () | Surint Karawoot สุรินทร คารวุตม์ |
| Jo () เลขาโจ () | ทศพล ศรีไชยะ |
| May () เมย์ () | มธุมาส พ่วงนาค |
| Hia Ngow () เฮียโหง้ว () | สุเอซ ปังศรีสมบูรณ์ |
| Phu Kor () พูกอ () | ธีรนันทน์ สุรเลิศรังษี |
| Sia Big Ma () เสี่ยบิ๊กมะ () | บรรจบ มณเฑียร |
| Por Liang Kha Lae () พ่อเลี้ยงกาแล () | ชลิตรัตน์ จันทรุเบกษา |
| Jenphob Kitworakul () จ่าเจนภพ กิจวรกุล () | ปัทมะ เปล่งพานิช |
| Pa Mor () ป๋ามอ () | อมร พงษ์พิชิตภูมิ |
| Kamnan Kai () กำนันไข่ () | เยี่ยมพนา ลีลาภิรมย์ |
| () เจ้าสัวนักธุรกิจกลุ่มมาวิน () | สุพจน์ ตั้งจารุจุรี |
| Hia Tek () เฮียเต็ก () | Suraphan Chaopaknam สุรพันธ์ ชาวปากน้ำ |
| Darin Seangkao () ร้อยตำรวจตรีหญิง ดาริน แสงแก้ว (หมวดดาริน) () | Nopparat Sukprasert นพรัตน์ สุขประเสริฐ |
| Lung Dam () ลุงดำ () | Dolkamol Sattatip ดลกมล ศรัทธาทิพย์ |
| () หมอเถื่อน () | Weerachai Hattakovit วีระชัย หัตถโกวิท |
| Feinken () สารวัตรเฟินเคน () | วรัญญู สุวรรณ |
| Mae Laun Ruangsuradecha () แม่ละมุน เรืองสุรเดชา () | Naruemon Phongsuphap นฤมล พงษ์สุภาพ |
| Mucama () ร้อยตำรวจตรีหญิง พรพรรณ แถวเถื่อน (แม่บ้านมาวิน/สายตำรวจ) () | Nuttanee Sittisamarn ณัฐนี สิทธิสมาน |
| Mni Mae () นายแม่ () | Penpak Sirikul เพ็ญพักตร์ ศิริกุล |

== Production ==
Mark Prin and Taew Natapohn reunite after working together in the drama Rak Nakara. This is Taew Natapohn's first full action drama. Nok Chatchai, the director of the movie also plays in the drama. This is Toon Pimpawee's first collaboration with Channel 3 after his contract with Channel 7 expires. This script has been made into a drama twice, the first time in 2010 using the title "Prajan Lai Payak", the second time in 2021, being this one. Both scripts were based on the original poem by Naphut Susri.

== Extra information ==
- เรื่องย่อละคร เกมล่าทรชน : Ch3Thailand
- เรื่องย่อละคร เกมล่าทรชน : MGR Online
