= Plik Din Su Dao =

- Also known as: Turn the Ground Towards the Stars
- พลิกดินสู่ดาว
- Written by: Changpanreung
- Directed by: Sithiwat Tubpaen
- Starring: Sukollawat Kanarot; Khemanit Jamikorn; Tawin Yavapolkul; Usamanee Vaithayanon
- Country of origin: Thailand
- Original language: Thai
- No. of episodes: 15

Production
- Production location: Thailand
- Running time: Friday - Sunday

Original release
- Network: Channel 7
- Release: 2006 – 2006

Plik Din Su Dao is a 2006 musical/drama/romance TV series produced by Channel 7. It stars Sukollawat Kanarot, Khemanit Jamikorn, Tawin Yavapolkul, and Usamanee Vaithayanon.

== Cast ==
- Sukollawat Kanarot as Taywit "Tay"
- Khemanit Jamikorn as Rada
- Tawin Yavapolkul as Thunwa "Thun"
- Usamanee Vaithayanon as Nubdao "Dao"
