= 4 Kings II =

2023 Thai film by Phuttipong Nakthong

- Thai: 4 คิงส์ 2
- Directed by: Phuttipong Nakthong
- Written by: Phuttipong Nakthong; Rattanapon Pakprieo
- Starring: Somphol Rungpanich; Ukrit Willibrord Dongabriel; Sutthirak Subvijitra; Sine Charoenpura; Sirat Intarachote; Todsapol Maisuk; Natthawut Jenmana; Benjamin Joseph Varney; Patara Eksangkul
- Edited by: Dog Back Dee
- Music by: Vanilla Sky Studio
- Production companies: Kum-Kub-Nang; Neramitnang Film
- Distributed by: Shinesaeng Ad. Venture
- Release date: November 30, 2023
- Running time: 139 minutes
- Country: Thailand
- Language: Thai
- Box office: ฿95.17 million (Bangkok, Metropolitan & Chiang Mai) ฿235.9 million (nationwide)

4 Kings II also known as 4 Kings 2 (Thai: 4 คิงส์ 2) is a 2023 Thai neo-noir crime drama film directed and written by Phuttipong Nakthong. It is the sequel to 4 Kings a film that created a phenomenon in 2021 as the highest-grossing Thai film of the year.

== Summary ==
The film continues the story from the previous part. It happened when Tummeng, a Kanokarcheewa student, was attacked and seriously injured, resentment arose among Kanokarcheewa students. Bang, the leader of the Kanok students, prepared revenge on Buranabondh students, who are foes.

But, it didn't go as expected. When Bang was caught, his sister, Bung had to help him in every possible way.

In the conflict between the students of these two schools, Yat an unlettered gangster was the variable.

Even though on the outside Yat looks like a brat, both didn't study and dealt drugs. But deep within his heart, he harbored feelings for the technical students who fought with each other and caused his grandfather to be caught in the crossfire causing paralysis today.

Yat and Bang have been friends since childhood. Finally, the friendship that the two once had had to break up.

The end scene is Billy and Oh, now friends, attend Yat's funeral, who was shot dead by Rok after recently arguing with Bang. The film is dedicated to all the souls lost in the battle between the vocational boys.

== Cast ==
=== Main ===
Actor	Role
Somphol Rungpanich	Bang
Ukrit Willibrord Dongabriel	Yat
Sutthirak Subvijitra	Rok
Sirat Intarachote	Aek
Sine Charoenpura	Bung

=== Supporting ===
Actor	Role
Patara Eksangkul	Kay Kanok
Natthawut Jenmana	Nui
Todsapol Maisuk	Tummeng
Benjamin Joseph Varney	Kay Buranabondh
Sahatchai Chumrum	Yat's Grandfather
Suteerush Channukool	Boss
Touch Na Takuathung	Rok's Father
Watsana Phunphon	Rok's Mother
Vithaya Pansringarm	Mr. Nipon
Sahajak Boonthanakit	Chaloem
Vasana Bootpetch	Aunt Ma
Nattawan Asavakarn	Ju
Oranat Ramasoot	Jiew

=== Guest appearances ===
Actor	Role
Akarin Akaranitimaytharatt	Mot
Timethai	Mac
Modern Dog	Themselves
Smile Buffalo	Three Men Drinking
Kongkiat Khomsiri	Prisoner
Arun Pawilai	Old Man
Rman Chocco	Art Student #1
Bhumibhat Thavornsiri	Art Student #2
Phuttipong Nakthong	Restroom Massager
Karinyawat Durongjirakan	Chaloemsat Student

=== Cameo appearances ===
Actor	Role
Itkron Pungkiatrussamee	Billy
Nat Kitcharit	Oh

== Original soundtrack ==
- "Rong Pai Kab Fah" (ร้องไปกับฟ้า; "Cry to the Sky"), ending theme by Somphol Rungpanich feat Ukrit Willibrord Dongabriel
- "Bang Sing" (บางสิ่ง; "Something") by Somphol Rungpanich (original version by Modern Dog)

== Production ==
On July 29, 2022, there was an announcement to recruit new performers to co-feature in the film.

The director and screenwriter, Phuttipong Nakthong said in an interview that this installment will focus especially on nighttime battle scenes. Because nighttime feels more raw, and quarrels on the streets at night are punishable more severely than during the day. Moreover, evening students are older and more foolhardy.

In this part, there are four main characters, Bang, Yat, Aek, and Rok, all of whom have family issues. The story is told quite deeply into the dimensions of each character. By touching on family issues, experience the inner wound that drives individuals to take drastic actions.

== Release and reception ==
4 Kings II was released on November 30, 2023, nationwide. The teaser was released on YouTube on October 25, 2023, and received over one million views within 24 hours.

The official trailer was released at 2:14 p.m. on November 14, 2023.

Although it was released on November 30, 2023, tickets can be purchased or reserved starting November 24, 2023.

The gala premiere screens on November 29, 2023 at 6:30 p.m. at Major Cineplex Ratchayothin.

First day of official screening, it grossed 19 million baht nationwide breaking the record of the prequel which made 10 million baht.
