= Arak Amornsupasiri =

Thai musician and actor

- อารักษ์ อมรศุภศิริ
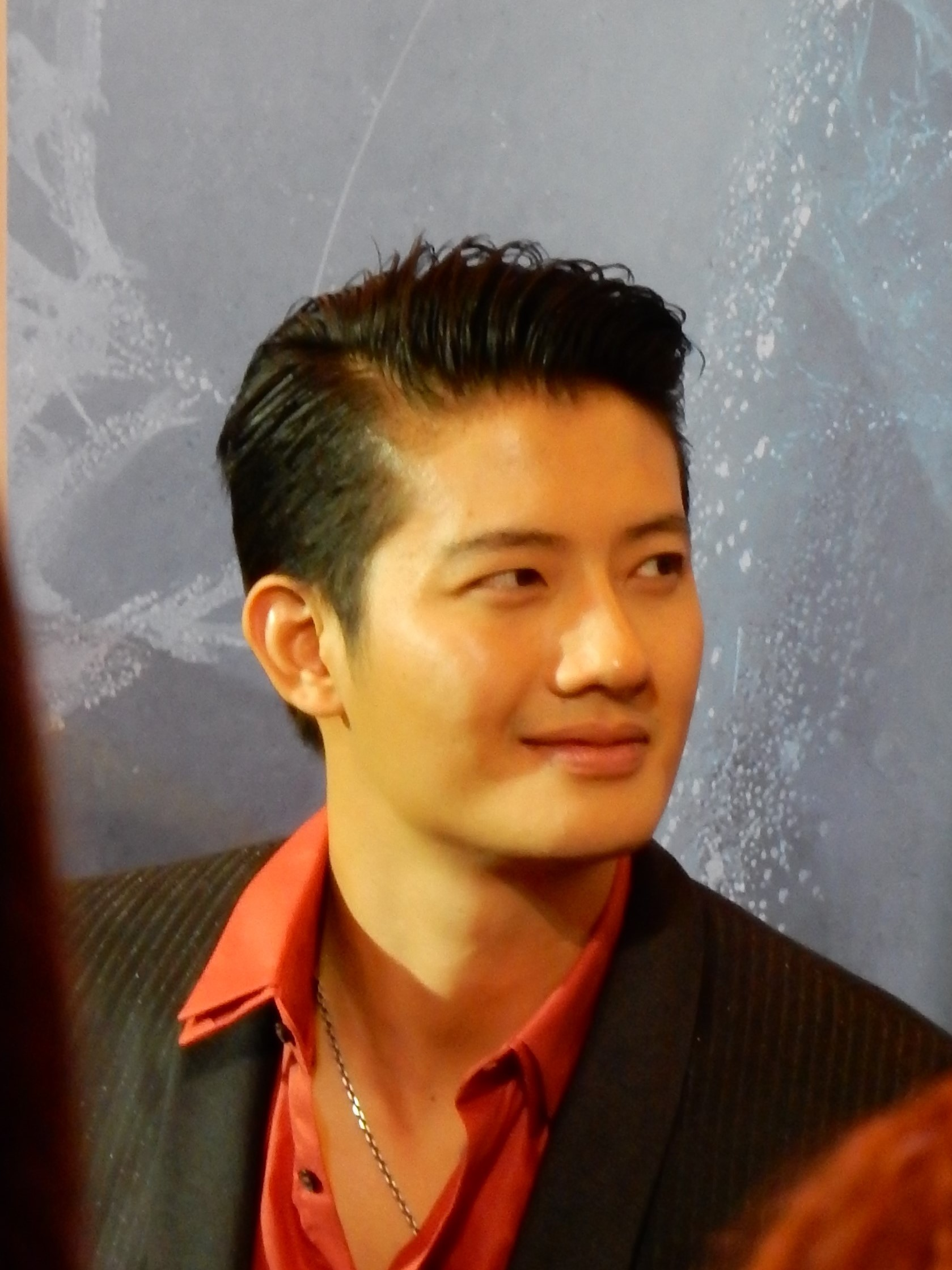
- Arak in 2016
- Born: 2 September 1984 (age 41)
- Other name: Pae
- Occupations: Actor; musician; film director
- Notable credit: Chon in Body
- Musical career
- Instruments: Guitar
- Label: Smallroom
- Formerly of: Slur

Arak Amornsupasiri (Thai: อารักษ์ อมรศุภศิริ, born 2 September 1984), nicknamed Pae (เป้), is a Thai musician, actor and director. He began his musical career as guitarist for the indie rock band Slur, before releasing his first album as a solo singer in 2010. He began acting in the 2007 film Body, and has starred in several films, including Best of Times (2009) and By the Time It Gets Dark (2016). His career also includes television acting and modelling.

== Filmography ==
=== As actor ===
Year	Title	Role
2007	Body	Chonlasid
2008	The Last Moment (2008 film)	Payu
2008	Rahtree Reborn	Payu
2008	Bittersweet BoydPod The Short Film	Pe'
2009	Best of Times	Keng
2009	Slice	Tai
2010	Princess Tukky	Frog Prince
2010	Saturday Killer	Oreo
2010	Loser Lover	Sudkhed
2010	Sawasdee Bangkok (Short film)	Young musician
2011	SuckSeed	Himself
2011	Bangkok Assassins	Phong
2011	Friday Killer	Oreo
2011	30+ Single On Sale	Chuet
2011	Bangkok Sweety	Tan
2012	Valentine Sweety	Tan
2012	Seven Something	Pae (Man on the phone)
2012	My Name is Love	Q
2013	Young Bao: The Movie	Lek
2014	Until Now	Ton
2015	Single Lady	Khem
2015	Cat A Wabb	Mor
2016	Khun Pan	Suea Bai (cameo)
2016	By the Time It Gets Dark	Peter
2018	Khun Pan 2	Suea Bai
2019	The Exchange	Joe
2020	Krabi, 2562	Pae Arak
2021	Haunted Tales	Pete (Haunted Car)
2021	4 Kings	Da Inthara
2023	Postman	Do
2023	Doi Boy	Ji
2024	In Youth We Trust	Beer
2025	Will You Marry Monk?	Luang Phi Pae
2025	4 Tigers	Suea Bai

=== As director ===
Year	Title	Note
2025	The Stone	Debut film

=== TV Drama ===
Year	Title	Role
2009	Jaew Jai Rai Kub Khun Chai Taewada	Chai Tadtheb (Khun Noo Chai)
2010	Tur Gub Kao Lae Ruk Kong Rao	Pao
2012	Zeal 5 Kon Gla Tah Atam	Sun
2012	Lieutenant Opas Season 2	Ken
2013	Cinderella Rong Tao Tae	Bancha (Bue)
2014	Club Friday Season 5: Secret of Marriage Proposal Clip	Nat
2015	Lueat Tat Lueat	Khun Chai Taecho
2015	Club Friday Season 6: Playboy	Zuii
2016	I See You	Dr. Araya Chaigoson
2016	Club Friday Season 8: True Love…or Pleasure	Bug
2017	Maya	Rachanont
2017	Bangkok Love Stories: Keep Love	Mok
2018	Bangkok Naruemit	Poj (Past) / Karan Teerayotin (Kaka)
2018	My Girl	Purich
2018	Oh My Ghost	Artit (Sun)
2019	Club Friday Season 10	Max
2019	Great Men Academy	Stand-In
2019	Tok Kra Dai Hua Jai Ploy Jone	Chonlachat Phithakkhuntham
2020	App Rak...Thak Kha	Pae
2021	Angkhan Khlumpong the Series (Ep.4 Nang Ram)	Don
2021	Mr. Lipstick	Nopphakhun Khunabodin
2021	In Time with You	Thanapon
2021	Me Always You	Kevin
2022	Phleng Bin Bai Ngiu	Naewprai
2022	Khru Ma	Wichai Wongsamang / Khru Ma
2023	A Match by Maid	Mana
2023	Valentine's Again: Dear My Magical Love	Pud

=== Hosting ===
Year	Thai title	Title	Network
2014	เกษตรซ้าด	Kaset Sad	NEW TV 18
2014	คนค้นฅน	The Explorer	Channel 9
2014	ชีวิตดีดี๊	Life's So Good	3HD33
2015	เกษตรอีซี่	Kaset Easy	Thai PBS
2021	อารักษ์ Around	Arak Around	Thai PBS

=== Bibliography ===
- สิ่งที่สวยงามมักจะอยู่ไกลออกไป
