= Kongkiat Komesiri =

Thai film director and screenwriter (born 1975)

- ก้องเกียรติ โขมศิริ
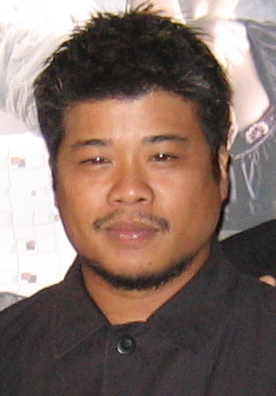
- Kongkiat from Hamburger Magazine in 2018
- Born: 2 June 1975 (age 51); Phanat Nikhom, Chonburi, Eastern Thailand
- Education: Bangkok University
- Occupations: Film director; screenwriter
- Spouse: Alisara Usavagovitwong
- Children: 1

Kongkiat "Kome" Komesiri (Thai: ก้องเกียรติ โขมศิริ, born 2 June 1975, in Thailand) is a Thai film director and screenwriter.

== Film career ==
Kongkiat graduated from the Faculty of Mass Communications at Bangkok University and started his career as a crew member on Mysterious Object at Noon, the first feature film by Apichatpong Weerasethakul. He then went to work for Five Star Production, working with director Thanit Jitnukul on the films Bang Rajan and Kunpan: Legend of the Warlord.

Kongkiat made his directorial debut in 2005 with Art of the Devil 2, credited as part of the seven-member "Ronin Team" of directors. His solo directorial debut was Muay Thai Chaiya in 2007. Khomsiri's next project called Slice was released in 2009. In 2022, he directed KinnPorsche.

== Filmography ==
=== Films ===
Year	Title	Director	Writer	Producer	Notes
2000	Bang Rajan	No	Yes	No	credited as Gonggiat Konsiri
2002	Kun pan: Legend of the Warlord	Yes	Yes	No	credited as Kongkiat Khomsiri
2003	Sema: The Warrior of Ayodhaya	Yes	Yes	No	co-director; credited as Gonggiat Konsiri
2005	Art of the Devil 2	Yes	Yes	No	credited as Kongkiat Khomsiri
2006	The Unseeable	No	Yes	No	credited as Kongkiat Khomsiri
2007	Muay Thai Chaiya	Yes	Yes	No	credited as Kongkiat Khomsiri
2008	Art of the Devil 3	Yes	Yes	No	credited as Kongkiat Khomsiri
2008	Coming Soon	No	Yes	No	
2009	Slice	Yes	Yes	No	credited as Kongkiat Khomsiri
2011	The 4 Movie	Yes	No	No	credited as Kongkiat Khomsiri
2012	Dark Flight	No	Yes	No	credited as Kongkiat Khomsiri
2012	The Gangster	Yes	Yes	No	credited as Kongkiat Khomsiri
2016	Take Me Home	Yes	Yes	No	credited as Kongkiat Khomsiri
2016	Khun Pan	Yes	No	No	credited as Kongkiat Khomsiri
2017	Pay It Forward	Yes	Yes	No	
2018	Sad Beauty	No	No	Yes	credited as Kongkiat Khomsiri
2018	Khun Pan 2	Yes	Yes	Yes	
2018	Nakee 2	No	Yes	No	credited as Kongkiat Khomsiri
2019	Khun Phaen Begins	Yes	Yes	No	credited as Kongkiat Khomsiri
2021	Sompoy	No	No	Yes	credited as Kongkiat Khomsiri
2022	SLR	No	No	Yes	credited as Kongkiat Khomsiri
2023	Khun Pan 3	Yes	Yes	Yes	
2024	Operation Undead	Yes	Yes	No	co-writer
2024	Bangkok Breaking: Heaven and Hell	Yes	Yes	No	Netflix film; spin-off of the 2021 series Bangkok Breaking
2025	4 Tigers	Yes	Yes	No	spin-off of the Khun Pan trilogy
2025	Our House	Yes	Yes	No	based on a horror story from The Ghost Radio

=== Television ===
Year	Title	Director	Writer	Producer	Notes
2015	Tawan Tud Burapha	Yes	Yes	No	
2017	Cheewit Puer Kah Huajai Puer Tur	Yes	No	No	
2017	A Love To Kill	No	Yes	No	aka Ruk Sorn Kaen; credited as Kongkiat Khomsiri
2017–2018	Chai Mai Jing Ying Tae	Yes	No	No	
2019	Voice	No	Yes	No	
2020	Daughters	No	Yes	No	
2021	Let's Fight Ghost	Yes	No	No	credited as Kongkiat Khomsiri
2021	Bangkok Breaking	Yes	No	No	credited as Kongkiat Khomsiri
2022	KinnPorsche	Yes	No	No	
2023	The Promise	Yes	No	No	
2024	My Stand-In	Yes	No	No	
2024	4Minutes	Yes	No	No	
2025	Homeroom	Yes	No	No	
