= Nemesis (2020 Thai film) =

- Film poster
- Thai: คืนยุติ-ธรรม
- Directed by: Gunparwitt Phuwadolwisid
- Written by: Gunparwitt Phuwadolwisid
- Produced by: Nonzee Nimibutr; Piyaluck Mahatanasab
- Starring: Jirayu Thantrakul; Ramavadi Nakchattri; Kiat Kitjaroen; Natathida Damrongwisetphanit; Silp Ruchiravanich
- Cinematography: Nawarophaat Rungphiboomsophit
- Edited by: Weeraphat Tem-bundit; Nonzee Nimibutr
- Music by: GIANTWAVE
- Production companies: Munwork Production; Dreambox Media
- Distributed by: M Pictures
- Release date: August 12, 2020
- Running time: 88 minutes
- Country: Thailand
- Language: Thai

Nemesis (Thai: คืนยุติ-ธรรม or Kuen Yuttitum) is a 2020 Thai action thriller film directed and written by Gunparwitt Phuwadolwisid.

== Plot ==
Manop, a young man who has a bright future in both work and love and is about to marry Duangjai. But his future is shattered when Duangjai is raped by her boss Sitichon. This made Manop angry and wgoingto attack Sitichon at the office lea to unexpected events. When Sitichon shot Duangjai to death ,Manop was seriously injured and woke up to become a defendant in the murder of his wife until he was imprisoned.

After getting out of prison, he meets Karnda a psychiatrist who volunteers to heal his mental illness. But then, over time, she discovered Manop, another person she didn't know who rose up to be a vigilante, demanding justice for society with violence every night. As the night progressed, the violence escalated into bloodshed and lea to the mystery behind all the events.

== Cast ==
- Jirayu Thantrakul as Manop/ Shiva
- Ramavadi Nakchattri as Karnda
- Kiat Kitjaroen as Sitichon
- Natathida Damrongwisetphanit as Anchalee/ Aun
- Silp Ruchiravanich as Chart
- Danai Jarujinda as Police
- Mookhapon Posakkabuth as Thanasak
- Natthakan Thayutajaruwit as Duangjai
- Vutichai Siriprusanun as Lawyer
- Piboon Thaihuan as Police at gas station
- Thanachat Thuamtumnong as Aun's father

== Original soundtrack ==
- "Yu-Titum" (ยุติ-ธรรม; "Justice"), ending theme by Taitosmith

== Production & release ==
Nemesis is a project that was in the director Gunparawitt Phuwadolwisid's mind for many years, until he got the chance to make it a reality. It was filmed and released in 2020 under the production of award-winning filmmaker Nonzee Nimitur. The whole story takes place and ends within 12 hours and is in the film noir style.

It is the first cinematic performance of the two lead performers, Jirayu Thantrakul and Ramavadi Nakchattri, and also an agnent-ype role for veteran comedian and TV host Kiat Kitjaroen, who portrays a bad guy for the first time.

The film premiered at Major Cineplex Ratchayothin on August 12, 2020.

== Trivia ==
Its Thai title, Kuen Yuttitum, literally translates to "The Night of Justice", but the Thai stylised "คืนยุติ-ธรรม" is a wordplay that may be translated as "The Night Ends Justice".
