= 4 Kings (2021 film) =

- Thai: 4 KINGS อาชีวะ ยุค 90
- Directed by: Phuttipong Nakthong
- Written by: Phuttipong Nakthong
- Produced by: Thanawat Thampreechapong
- Starring: Itkron Pungkiatrussamee; Poom Rungsrithananon; Arak Amornsupasiri; Nat Kitcharit; Sirat Intarachote; Akarin Akaranitimaytharatt; Ukrit Willibrord Dongabriel
- Cinematography: Pasit Tandaechanurat
- Edited by: Dog Back Dee
- Music by: Terdsak Janpan
- Production companies: Kum-Kub-Nang; Neramitnang Film
- Distributed by: M Pictures
- Release date: 9 December 2021
- Running time: 139 minutes
- Country: Thailand
- Language: Thai
- Budget: ฿15 million
- Box office: ฿69.82 million (Bangkok, Metropolitan & Chiang Mai) ฿170 million (nationwide)

4 Kings (Thai: 4 KINGS อาชีวะ ยุค 90 or 4 Kings ar chee wa yuk 90, lit: 4 Kings 90's vocational) is a 2021 Thai neo-noir crime drama film written and directed by Phuttipong Nakthong, produced by Thanawat Thampreechapong The film follows the conflict between vocational students and students of various institutions in the 1990s.

== Plot ==
Set in 1995, the film is told through the memories of Billy, a former vocational student turned single dad to his teenage daughter, Am. Although their relationship is not very healthy, when Am is injured in a fight between gangs at her vocational school, Billy reminisces about his own past and that of his friends. In the '90s, many vocational schools were notorious for their rowdy students. The most famous of these were Intaraarcheewasueksa, Changkolburanabondh and Technologyprachachol. (Note: In fact, the school's name is "Technologyprachachuen (โรงเรียนเทคโนโลยีประชาชื่น )", but it was changed to "Technologyprachachol (โรงเรียนเทคโนโลยีประชาชล )" in the film because the administrators did not allow the original name to be used. The school changed its status a long time ago, though.) and Kanokarcheewa. They were collectively nicknamed "4 Kings".

Billy became depressed when his mother remarried and his stepfather began to hate him. His only escape was his close friends, so he did everything he could to maintain his friendships at school. Billy encountered all sorts of conflicts and lost his best friend. This was a valuable life lesson that he has had to learn ever since.

== Cast ==
- Itkron Pungkiatrussamee (Jaii TaitosmitH) as Billy
- Poom Rungsrithananon as Lupin
- Arak Amornsupasiri (Pae Slur) as Da
- Nat Kitcharit as Oh
- Sirat Intarachote as Ek
- Akarin Akaranitimaytharatt as Mot
- Ukrit Willibrord Dongabriel (ฺBig D Gerrard) as Yat
- Somphol Rungpanich (Lham Somphol) as Bang
- Naerunchara Lertprasert as Ou
- Sukanya Migael as Da's mother
- Jirawat Wachirasarunpat as Ou's father
- Paramej Noiam as Billy's stepfather
- Priya Sangkhachinda as Am, Inthira
- Ratchanee Boontatharokul as Billy's mother
- Pimchamai Pattarasinsiri as Ou's mother
- Warawut Brown as Rang
- Chanatip Pisutseerewong as X

== Production and reception ==
The film based on actual events in Thai society about the issue of quarrels among teenage vocational students which injures unrelated persons as well. They often fought on the streets, on buses, or at bus stops. Film director and writer Phuttipong Nakthong had been through these terrible times and therefore used his own experience to convey it into a screenplay. It took up to 7 years for production to be released. It is his debut film from newlyn motion picture production company Neramitnang Film.

4 Kings develops itself from a short film in same title released on social media in mid-2015 about a battle between vocational students until it became very well known.

When it was released, it quickly gained popularity and became a phenomenon. It was No. 1 at the box office on opening weekend, with a total income of ฿50 million after only 4 days of showing, beating Thai-South Korean found footage mockumentary horror film The Medium from the top spot. Separately, Thai Civilized Party leader Mongkolkit Suksintharanon on 14 December invited vocational students to join him at Esplanade Cineplex Ngamwongwan-Khae Rai to watch the film.

At each screening in theatres in various locations, vocational students often gather to watch the film. And they often fight after it ends. It has been observed whether this is a film imitation behavior.

The film has been in theatres for 9 weeks in a row. Total revenue of ฿170 million was considered the highest grossing Thai film in the year.

It was selected to screen at the 17th Japan Asian Film Festival or Osaka Asian Film Festival 2022 as a special program New Action! Southeast Asia between 10–20 March 2022, as well as being nominated for 2 awards.

It was shown again as an outdoor cinema in the evening of 14 July 2022 at the Vachirabenjatas Park (Rot Fai Park) as part of Open-Air Movie Festival by Bangkok Metropolitan Administration (BMA).

== Original soundtrack ==
- "Nak Leng Kao" (นักเลงเก่า; "Former Gangster"), ending theme by TaitosmitH feat D Gerrard
- "Mung Kub Ku" (มึงกับกู; "You & I") by Itkron Pungkiatrussamee
- "Kid Pai Aeng" (คิดไปเอง; "All In Your Head") by SMF
- "Palang Rak" (พลังรัก; "Love Power") by SMF
- "Wad Rawaeng" (หวาดระแวง; "Paranoid") by SMF
- "Khon" ("ก่อน"; "Before") by Modern Dog
- "Sabai Dee" (สบายดี; "Fine") by Nakarin Kingsak

== Accolades ==
Award	Subject	Nominee	Result	Note
18th Kom Chad Luek Awards	Best Actor	Itkron Pungkiatrussamee	Won	
18th Kom Chad Luek Awards	Best Supporting Actor	Ukrit Willibrord Dongabriel	Won	
Osaka Asian Film Festival 2022	Audience Award	4 Kings	Nominated	
Osaka Asian Film Festival 2022	ABC Award	4 Kings	Nominated	
30th Bangkok Critics Assembly Awards	Best Original Song	Mung Kub Ku	Won	
30th Bangkok Critics Assembly Awards	Best Actor	Itkron Pungkiatrussamee	Won	
30th Bangkok Critics Assembly Awards	Best Supporting Actor	Nat Kitcharit	Won	
30th Bangkok Critics Assembly Awards	Best Supporting Actress	Sukanya Migael	Won	
30th Bangkok Critics Assembly Awards	2021 Highest-grossing Thai Film	4 Kings	Won	
30th Suphannahong National Film Awards	Best Picture	4 Kings	Nominated	
30th Suphannahong National Film Awards	Best Director	Phuttipong Nakthong	Nominated	
30th Suphannahong National Film Awards	Best Actor	Itkron Pungkiatrussamee	Won	
30th Suphannahong National Film Awards	Best Actor	Arak Amornsupasiri	Nominated	
30th Suphannahong National Film Awards	Best Supporting Actor	Nat Kitcharit	Won	
30th Suphannahong National Film Awards	Best Supporting Actress	Sukanya Migael	Nominated	
30th Suphannahong National Film Awards	Best Original Screenplay	Phuttipong Nakthong	Nominated	
30th Suphannahong National Film Awards	Best Cinematography	Pasit Tandaechanurat	Nominated	
30th Suphannahong National Film Awards	Best Sound Editing and Mixing	Kantana Sound Studio	Nominated	
30th Suphannahong National Film Awards	Best Editing	Dog Back Dee	Nominated	
30th Suphannahong National Film Awards	Best Original Song	Mung Kub Ku	Nominated	
30th Suphannahong National Film Awards	Best Original Score	Toi Terdsak	Nominated	
30th Suphannahong National Film Awards	Best Art Direction	Kacha Ruangthong	Nominated	
30th Suphannahong National Film Awards	Best Costume Design	Siriwan Kanchuchor	Nominated	
30th Suphannahong National Film Awards	Best Makeup	Tattalee Jarujutarat	Nominated	
30th Suphannahong National Film Awards	Best Visual Effects	Brothers Pictures	Nominated	

== Sequel ==
At 9:29 a.m. on Friday, 14 October 2022, Neramitnang Film executives and the production team visited Wat Ratchasittharam temple to pray and receive blessings for the filming of 4 Kings Part 2. This ceremony was participated by 4 Kings original actors as well as the cast from the new film.

4 Kings Part 2 scheduled to be released in 2023. It is believed the story seems to be a conflict between Kanokarcheewa and Changkolburanabondh as shown in a mid-credits scene shows three Kanok students, led by Bang walk to face three Buranabondh students, led by Ek. Bang shoots a gun to threaten the sky and finally saying "See you next album, man".
