= Khun Pan 2 =

- Film poster
- Directed by: Kongkiat Khomsiri
- Written by: Kongkiat Khomsiri; Sukosin Akkrapat
- Produced by: Somsak Techarattanaprasert
- Starring: Ananda Everingham; Arak Amornsupasiri; Wanchana Swasdee; Rachwin Wongviriya; Nuntawut Boonrubsub; Suchao Pongvilai; Apa Bhavilai; Komsan Karjornpaisansuk
- Cinematography: Tiwa Moeithaisong; Saran Srisingchai
- Edited by: Phunsunit Asvinikul
- Music by: Terdsak Janpan
- Production company: Sahamongkol Film International
- Distributed by: Sahamongkol Film International
- Release date: August 23, 2018
- Running time: 125 minutes
- Country: Thailand
- Languages: Thai; Japanese
- Box office: ฿126 million

Khun Pan 2 (Thai: ขุนพันธ์ 2) is a 2018 Thai action thriller film from Sahamongkol Film International that was released on August 23, 2018, directed by Kongkiat Khomsiri, who was the director from the first installment. This film is a sequel to Khun Pan, which released in 2016, telling the story after the first installment. It tells the story of Khun Pan in the arrest of Suea Bai and Suea Fai, two famous sorcerer thieves in the central region. It was followed by another sequel, Khun Pan 3.

The film won the Best Makeup Effects and Best Costume Design categories at the 28th Suphannahong National Film Awards.
