= Phakin Khamwilaisak =

Thai actor and midfielder

- ภาคิน คำวิลัยศักดิ์
- Born: August 29, 1986 (age 40); Khon Kaen, Thailand
- Other name: Tono (โตโน่)
- Education: Suan Dusit University
- Occupations: Singer; actor; footballer
- Years active: 2010–present
- Notable work: The Star
Association football career
- Position: Midfielder
Senior career*
Years	Team	Apps	(Gls)
2021–2022	Ratchaburi Mitr Phol	1	(0)
2022–2023	Ayutthaya United	1	(0)
2023–2024	Khon Kaen	2	(0)
2024–2025	Kasetsart	1	(0)
- * Club domestic league appearances and goals

Phakin Khamwilaisak (Thai: ภาคิน คำวิลัยศักดิ์; born August 29, 1986), nicknamed Tono (โตโน่), is a Thai singer, actor and footballer from Khon Kaen, Thailand. He became known in 2010 from participating in the sixth season of the singing competition The Star.

In 2021, he started to play as a midfielder for Thai League 1 club Ratchaburi Mitr Phol after given a short term 6-month contract.

== Early life and education ==
Phakin is the eldest son and he has a younger sister. His nickname Tono is based on an alias his father used as a boxer. He graduated from Suan Dusit Rajabhat University (since 2015 changed to Suan Dusit University).

== Career ==
Phakin is best known as Tono the star 6. He is so-called because he was among the eight finalists that competed in The Star, season 6, a singing contest that is broadcast live on Thai television. Phakin did not win The Star 6 but he was the second runner up with Rueangrit Siriphanit (Ritz The Star 6) as the first runner up and Napat Injaiuea (Gun The Star 6) as the winner.

In 2021, he joined Ratchaburi Mitr Phol FC as a footballer.

== Personal life ==
He used to be in a relationship with actress Pataratida Patcharawirapong from 2013 to 2015. The two separated in 2015. Tono has been linked to channel 3 actress Nuttanicha Dungwattanawanich since 2016 after they starred in The Cupids Series: Kammathep Sorn Kol. The two often go travel and do merits together with their families. Both deny the title of "boyfriend and girlfriend" but have been exclusive since 2017.

On October 22, 2022, he successfully swam across the Mekong river between Nakhon Phanom in Thailand and Khammouan province in Laos, covering a distance of 15 km (9.3 mi), which is a charity event that he wants to raise funds to buy medical equipment for both Thai and Lao hospitals. This activity can receive donations up to 60 million baht.

== Filmography ==
=== Film ===
Year	Title	Role	Notes
2013	Love Syndrome	Arm	Main Role
2017	E-San Love Story	Sian	Main Role
2021	Som Pla Noi	Noi	Main Role
2023	Khun Pan 3	Suea Dam	Main Role
2025	4 Tigers	Suae Dam	Main Role

=== Dramas ===
Year	Title	Role	With	Network
2011	Kham Wela Ha Rak (ข้ามเวลาหารัก)	Kid	Panwarot Duaysianklao	Channel 5 (Thailand)
2011	Ruean Phae (เรือนแพ)	Kaew	Busakorn Tantiphana	Channel 5 (Thailand)
2011	Bu-Ngah Nah Fon (บุหงาหน้าฝน)	Navis Thepsutthipong	Siriphitchaya Wisitwaithayakul	Channel 5 (Thailand)
2012	Nang Sing Sabat Cho (นางสิงห์สะบัดช่อ)	Yong	Wannarot Sonthichai	Channel 5 (Thailand)
2013	Buang Wan Wan (บ่วงวันวาร)	Chat / Yodchat	Warattaya Nilkuha / Pimmada Boriraksupakorn	Channel 5 (Thailand)
2013	Peek Marn (ปีกมาร)	Lai Sue		Channel 5 (Thailand)
2015	Sue Rissaya (สื่อริษยา)	Sarun		
2015	Hua Jai Mee Ngao (หัวใจมีเงา)	Kawee Wongkiat-anan	Manussanan Panlertwongsakul	
2016	Yoo Tee Rao (อยู่ที่เรา)	Ton		LINE TV
2016	Petch-cha-kat Dao Jone (เพชฌฆาตดาวโจร)	Leng		One 31
2016	We Were Born in the 9th Reign Series	Keng	Raviyanun Takerd	One 31
2017	Kammathep Hunsa (กามเทพหรรษา)	Sarun		Channel 3 (Thailand)
2017	Kammathep Sorn Kol (กามเทพซ้อนกล)	Sarun	Nuttanicha Dungwattanawanich	Channel 3 (Thailand)
2018	Monkey Twins (วายุเทพยุทธ์)	Mawin	Alrisa Kunkwaeng	One 31
2021	Duang Jai Nai Montra (ดวงใจในมนตรา)	Pachon	Nuttanicha Dungwattanawanich	Channel 3 (Thailand)
2021	Pra Chan Daeng (พระจันทร์แดง)	Sama	Oranate D.Caballes	One 31
2022	Wiwa Fah Laep (วิวาห์ฟ้าแลบ)	Pokpong	Fonthip Watcharatrakul	One 31

=== TV sitcoms ===
Year	Title	Network	With
2010	Nat Kap Nat (นัดกับนัด)	Modernine TV	Anattapol Sirichumsaeng, Sukrit Wisetkaew and Ruangrit Siripanich
2012	Luk Phi Luk Nong (ลูกพี่ลูกน้อง)	Modernine TV	Napat Injaiuea

=== Musicals ===
Year	Title	With
2010	Hong Nuea Mangkon the Musical (หงส์เหนือมังกร เดอะมิวสิคัล)	Suthasinee Buddhinan and Preeti Barameeanant

== Discography ==
=== Soundtracks ===
Year	Song title	Notes
2011	คนเลวก็มีหัวใจ	Ruean Phae OST
2011	มันถูกกำหนดไว้แล้ว	Bu-Ngah Nah Fon OST
2012	รักเธออยู่ดี	Punya Chon Kon Krua 2012 OST
2013	คนที่เธอไม่ควรเผลอใจ	Peak Marn OST
2013	อยากเป็นคนที่ทำให้เธอรู้สึกดี	Fah Krajang Dao 2013 OST
2015	เพิ่งรู้หัวใจตัวเอง	Roy Leh Sanae Rai 2014 OST
2015	คนเดิม	Hua Jai Mee Ngao OST
2016	ยังไงก็โดน	Petchakard Dao Jorn OST
2016	หลอมละลาย	Raeng Tawan OST
2017	ขอบคุณ	Bunlang Dok Mai OST
2017	พรหมลิขิตมั้ง	Kammathep Sorn Kol OST
2019	ต่ำกว่าศูนย์	Look Poochai Series OST
2021	ถ้าไร้เธอ	Duang Jai Nai Montra OST
2021	บนเส้นด้าย	Pra Chan Daeng OST
2021	สัตว์ร้าย Feat. เอ๋ Ebola	Pra Chan Daeng OST

== Awards and recognition ==
- 2019, Phakin was the first Asian to be nominated as an ambassador by the United Nations Ocean Conference

== Club ==
Club	Season	League			FA Cup		League Cup		AFC Champions League		Total	
Club	Season	Division	Apps	Goals	Apps	Goals	Apps	Goals	Apps	Goals	Apps	Goals
Ratchaburi Mitr Phol	2021–22	Thai League 1	1	0	0	0	0	0	0	0	1	0
Ayutthaya United	2022–23	Thai League 2	1	0	3	0	0	0	0	0	4	0
Khon Kaen	2023–24	Thai League 3	1	0	0	0	0	0	0	0	1	0
	Total		3	0	3	0	0	0	0	0	6	0
