= Thai Civilized Party =

Thai political party

Thai Civilized Party พรรคไทยศรีวิไลย์
- Abbreviation: TCL
- Leader: Vacant
- Secretary-General: Wiwat Charenpanitsiri
- Spokesperson: Pakaon Chantarakana
- Founded: 2 March 2018
- Dissolved: 5 September 2025
- Ideology: Conservatism; Nationalism
- Political position: Centre-right
- House of Representatives: 0 / 500

The Thai Civilized Party (Thai: พรรคไทยศรีวิไลย์) is a minor political party in Thailand. It was registered on 2 March 2018. Party founders include Mongkolkit Suksintharanon, secretary-general of the National Anti-Corruption Network (an anti-corruption NGO), and social media personality Natchapol Supattana or "Mark Pitbull". On 10 June 2018, the party announced a resolution naming Mongkolkit as party leader and Natchapol as deputy leader, and named anti-corruption, government reform, and social justice as its three core policies.

The party contested the 2019 Thai general election, fielding candidates in 226 constituencies and submitting 26 party list names. It did not win any of the constituencies, but gained one party list seat and joined the government coalition headed by the Palang Pracharath Party.

On 8 August 2019, party leader Mongkolkit said that Thai Civilized and four other parties would withdraw from the government coalition due to the parties not being assigned any cabinet positions, forming an "independent opposition" separate from the existing coalition. However, following talks, the other parties announced that they would not leave the coalition, thus causing Thai Civilized to leave the government alone, officially doing so on 13 August 2019.

== Election results ==
Election	Total seats won	Popular vote	Share of votes	Outcome of election	Election leader
2019	1 / 500	60,354	0.17%	▲1 seats; Junior partner in governing coalition (2019); Independent opposition (2019–2023)	Mongkolkit Suksintharanon
2023	0 / 500	23,721	0.06%	▼1 seats; No representation in Parliament	Mongkolkit Suksintharanon
