= Khun Pan =

- Film poster
- Directed by: Kongkiat Khomsiri
- Screenplay by: Kongkiat Khomsiri
- Story by: Kongkiat Khomsiri
- Produced by: Prachya Pinkaew; Sukanya Vongsthapat
- Starring: Ananda Everingham; Krissada Sukosol Clapp; Phimonrat Phisarayabud; Chupong Changprung; Pakchanok Wo-Onsri; Sonthaya Chitmanee; Karnpitchar Ketmanee
- Cinematography: Tiwa Moeithaisong
- Edited by: Phunsunist Authsarwinikool
- Music by: Therdsak Janpan
- Production company: Baa-ram-ewe
- Distributed by: Sahamongkol Film International
- Release date: July 14, 2016
- Running time: 109 minutes
- Country: Thailand
- Languages: Thai; French; Japanese
- Box office: ฿62 million

Khun Pan (Thai: ขุนพันธ์, RTGS: Khun Phan) is a Thai action thriller film released in 2016 based on the life story of Police Major General Khun Pantharak Ratchadet. The legendary sorcerer police officer, starring Ananda Everingham and Krissada Sukosol Clapp, directed by Kongkiat Khomsiri, had the sequel is Khun Pan 2.

== Plot ==
Year 1940, after successfully defeating Suea Krab Khamthong, the famous sorcerer thief, Police Lieutenant Khun Phantharak Ratchadet (Ananda Everingham) received a mission from Luang Adul (Santi Lun-pae), who was the Royal Police Director-general at the time to, investigate news of Al Hawi Yalu (inspired from, Awaesador Talae, another famous sorcerer thief) a separatist sorcerer thief, the owner of the "tripartite" of rare 3 things believed to have magical powers. Khun Pan infiltrates a fishing village headed by Khai Tho and works in the ivory club of Luang Ohran, a corrupt civil servant who deceives Al Hawi Yalu for personal gain, Al Hawi Yalu asks the 2 police officers, who survived being ambushed by their own guerrillas and found that There is also a police officer lurking in the area. Khun Pan traveled to meet with Al Hawi Yalu's father and found that in his childhood, Al Hawi Yalu had revered his father. But the loss of his mother in the turmoil between his father and the police made Al Hawi Yalu estranged from his father and hated the police very much. He set up guerrillas to rule the area of the Budo Mountains. Later, Khun Pan met Malai, who was Khai Tho's sister, before being attacked by Al Hawi Yalu's guerrillas Khun Pan was shot but escaped.

== Release and reception ==
Khun Pan grossed a total of 61,743,275 baht, making it the third highest grossing movie of 2016 in Thailand.

Khun Pan won the Best Supporting Actor (Krissada Sukosol Clapp), Best Visual Effects, Best Costume Design, and Best Makeup Effects at the 26th Suphannahong National Film Awards. It was screened at the 2018 New York Asian Film Festival in its Secret Screening event. V.N. Pryor, reviewing the film on Cinapse, called it a "deeply, deeply strange movie," and said that "[it] frickin’ moves."
