= Varitda =

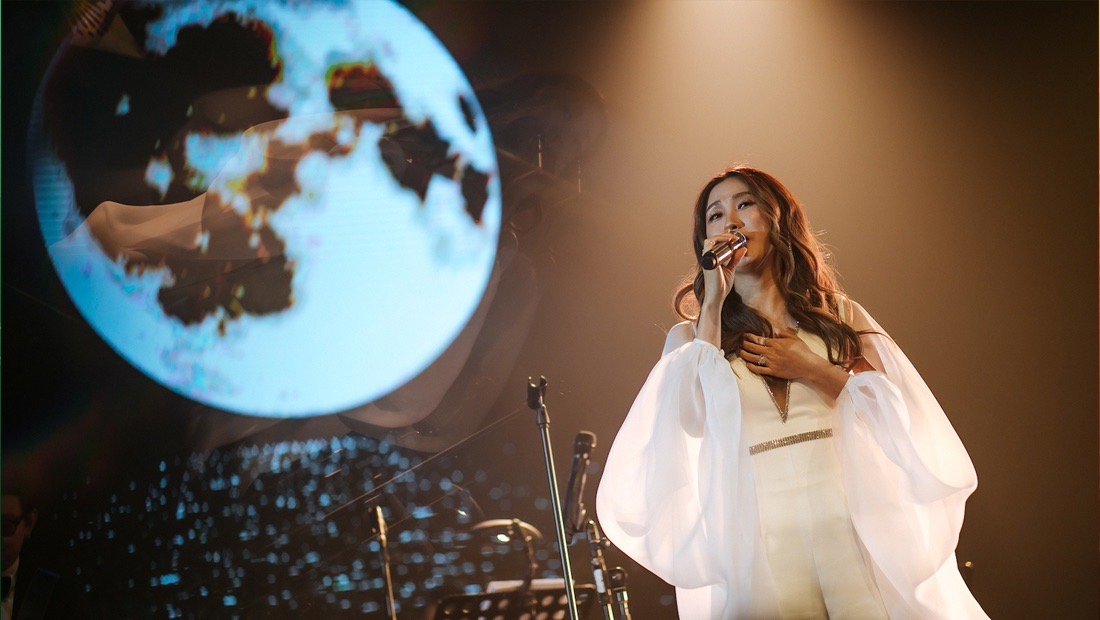

Background information
- Born: 22 July; Bangkok, Thailand
- Origin: Bangkok, Thailand
- Genres: Pop Jazz, Jazz
- Occupation: Singer
- Years active: 2020–present
- Spouse: Vudtinun Bhirombhakdi (m. 2007)

Varitda Bhirombhakdi, known professionally as Varitda (stylized as VARITDA), is a Thai singer whose work combines elements of jazz, lo-fi, and pop. Her music blends traditional jazz influences with contemporary production techniques, incorporating live instrumentation alongside modern ambient soundscapes.

VARITDA's early work focused on reinterpreting jazz standards and pop jazz classics, drawing inspiration from artists such as Nat King Cole and Ella Fitzgerald. With a background in classical music, she incorporates structured arrangements and organic instrumentation into her recordings. Over time, her style has evolved to integrate lo-fi beats and modern production elements, creating a more contemporary sound while maintaining a connection to jazz traditions.

Her approach to jazz reflects an effort to bridge traditional and modern musical styles, appealing to both long-time jazz listeners and new audiences

== Early life and background ==
Varitda was born on 22 July in Bangkok, Thailand. She trained primarily in classical music at her young age, with Piano and Cello as her main instrument. Later on, she studied in business and earned a BBA degree from Chulalongkorn University and MBA from the Sasin Graduate Institute of Business Administration of Chulalongkorn University. Before pursuing music professionally, she worked in the corporate sector. She is married to Vudtinun Bhirombhakdi, managing director of Muzik Move Co., Ltd. and executive vice president at Boonrawd Brewery Co., Ltd., in 2007.

== Musical career ==
Varitda's musical career began with the release of her Mood trilogy, which consists of jazz standards and pop jazz arrangements. These albums were noted for their live studio recordings and carefully arranged musical compositions.

Her third album, Mood3: I'm in the Mood For Love, released in 2023, included her debut original song, Maybe This Is Love. The album received recognition, winning Best Recording of the Year at the Guitar Mag Awards in 2024. Varitda was also nominated for Best Female Artist at the Kom Chad Luek Awards in the same year.

== Discography ==
- "twenty-first" (2025)

“twenty-first" is a lo-fi pop single by VARITDA, released in 2025. The music was co-written by VARITDA and Jamie Song of A-Team Korea, with lyrics by PYC and production by Nache Chan. The track draws inspiration from the number 21—a personally significant date that marks the artist's wedding anniversary.

Blending lo-fi textures with subtle jazz influences melodies and mellow pop sensibilities, the song creates an intimate, dreamlike atmosphere. Its minimalistic production, soft vocals, and warm chord progressions evoke the glow of moonlight, reinforcing themes of love that deepens over time and the steady devotion of timeless love—reflecting the idea that love doesn't need to be loud; it just needs to be real.

- "Never Mine" (2024)

“Never Mine" is a lo-fi pop single by VARITDA, co-produced and written by WIM and Nache Chan. The song tells a bittersweet love story, capturing the emotional tension between longing and acceptance. It reflects on the experience of desiring someone while knowing the connection can never fully be—resonating with listeners who have let love slip away due to unspoken feelings.

Musically, Never Mine blends contemporary lo-fi production with jazz-inspired chords and melodies, paired with VARITDA's signature vocal style. The result is a sound that feels both timeless and modern.

=== Albums ===
- Mood3: I'm in the Mood For Love (2023)
  - Tracklist:
    - "I'm in the Mood for Love"
    - "The Lady Wants To Know"
    - "One Note Samba"
    - "Stardust"
    - "If"
    - "Maybe This Is Love"
    - "Somewhere In Time"
    - "หัวใจเหิร (Love Flew Away)"
- Mood2: Jazz in the City (2021)
  - Tracklist:
    - "All the Things You Are"
    - "Lately"
    - "Part Of Your World"
    - "Orange Colored Sky"
    - "The Last Time"
    - "That's All"
    - "Grown-Up Christmas List"
    - "Even If"
- Mood (2020)
  - Tracklist:
    - "My One and Only Love"
    - "A Love That Will Last"
    - "The Christmas Song"
    - "I Wish You Love"
    - "The Nearness Of You"
    - "By The Time I Get To Phoenix"
    - "Overjoyed"

== Awards and recognition ==
- Best Recording of the Year – Guitar Mag Awards (2024)
- Nomination: Best Female Artist – Kom Chad Luek Awards (2024)
