= Beer in Thailand =

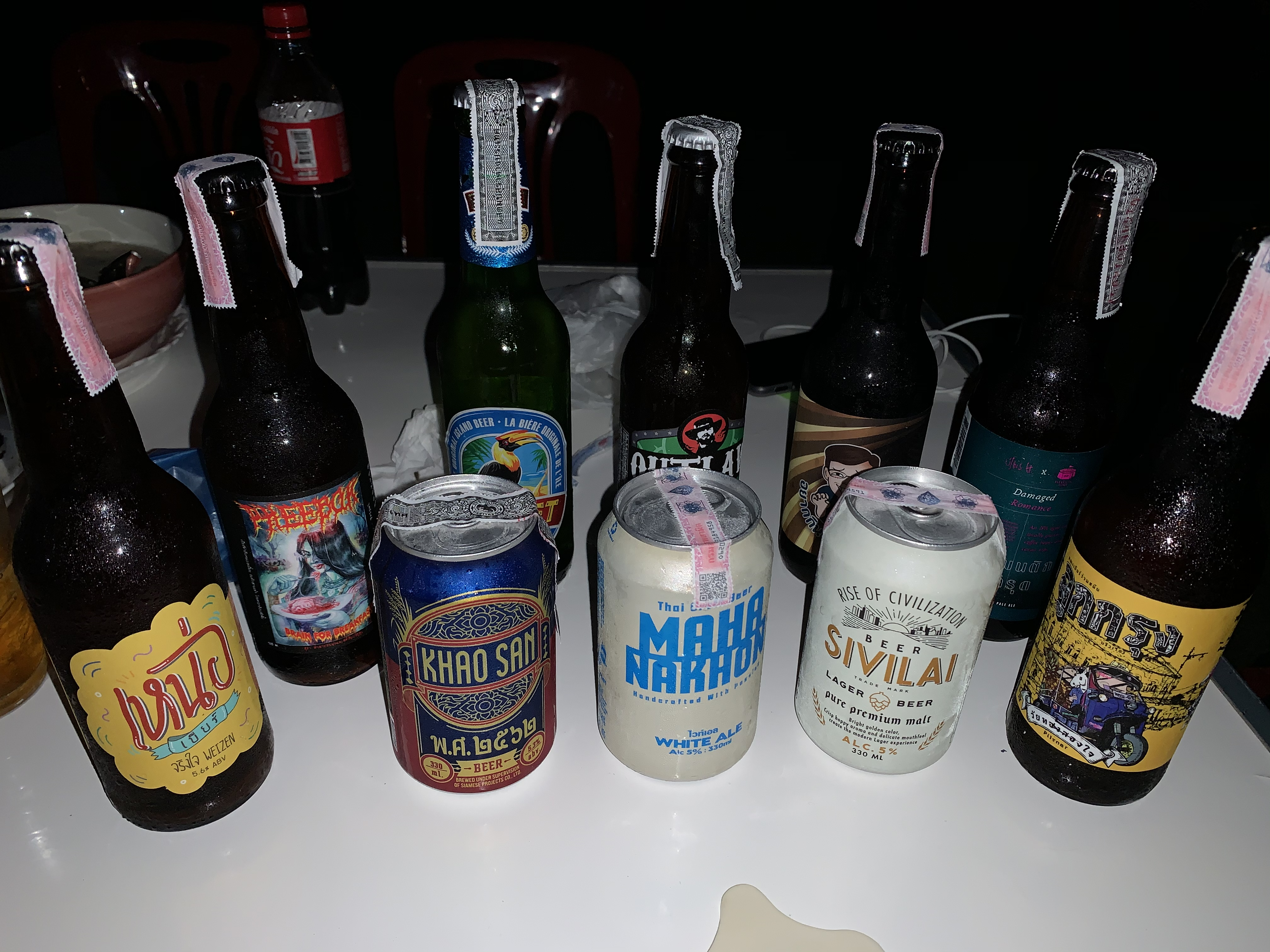
Various brands of Thailand's craft beer

Beer in Thailand was first brewed in 1933 when a licence was granted to the Boon Rawd Brewery, which still produces Thailand's best-known lager, Singha (pronounced "sing"), sold in standard (5 percent ABV), light (4.5 percent ABV), and draught versions.

Singha's largest competitor is Chang beer, made by Thai Beverages, whose sponsorship of Everton F.C. saw its name and logo appear on the team's kit from 2004 to 2017.

The Thai Asia Pacific Brewery (TAPB) has brewed Heineken at its Nonthaburi plant since 1995, as well as Tiger, Cheers, and Cheers X-Tra (6.5 percent ABV). It is the Thai importer of Guinness and Kilkenny.

Boon Rawd Brewery also makes Leo, a standard lager, and Thai Beverages Archa, a mass-market, non-premium lager. Boon Rawd Brewery also sold a global brand called Mittweida, but this was replaced by a beer brewed in partnership with InBev, Kloster. It also sells a 6.5 percent lager called Thai Beer.

Other Thai beers are Phuket Beer and Siam, both in Pathum Thani Province. Siam Beer exports Bangkok Beer abroad, but does not sell it in Thailand. Phuket Beer and Federbräu are the only Thai beers brewed in accordance with the German purity law, the Reinheitsgebot. Phuket Lager received the first gold medal ever for a beer from Thailand at the 2006 Monde Selection Awards. Klassik beer is another local beer brewed in Pathum Thani Province.

Foreign beers are not very popular in Thailand, mainly because the government protects its domestic breweries by the imposition of import duties up to 60 percent. In addition, all imported beer must bear an import sticker on the bottle cap. As a result, Thai brewers have entered into partnerships with Western brewers, such as Carlsberg's with Thai Beverages and Asahi's with Boon Rawd.

== Economics ==
Thailand has two big companies: Boon Rawd Brewery and Thai Beverages, with the following turnovers.

Thai Beverages:

- 2012 – Income : 34,386 million baht loss : 1,256 million baht
- 2013 – Income : 32,935 million baht loss : 447 million baht
- 2014 – Income : 35,193 million baht profit : 396 million baht
- 2015 – Income : 43,112 million baht profit : 1,215 million baht
- 2016 – Income : 44,397 million baht profit : 2,780 million baht

Boon Rawd Brewery:

- 2012 – Income : 98,990 million baht profit : 3,115 million baht
- 2013 – Income : 105,563 million baht profit : 3,256 million baht
- 2014 – Income : 113,897 million baht profit : 2,915 million baht
- 2015 – Income : 116,548 million baht profit : 2,310 million baht
- 2016 – Income : 104,794 million baht profit : 770 million baht

In 2018, the proportions were Leo 53%, Chang 38%, and Singha 5%.

== Craft beer ==
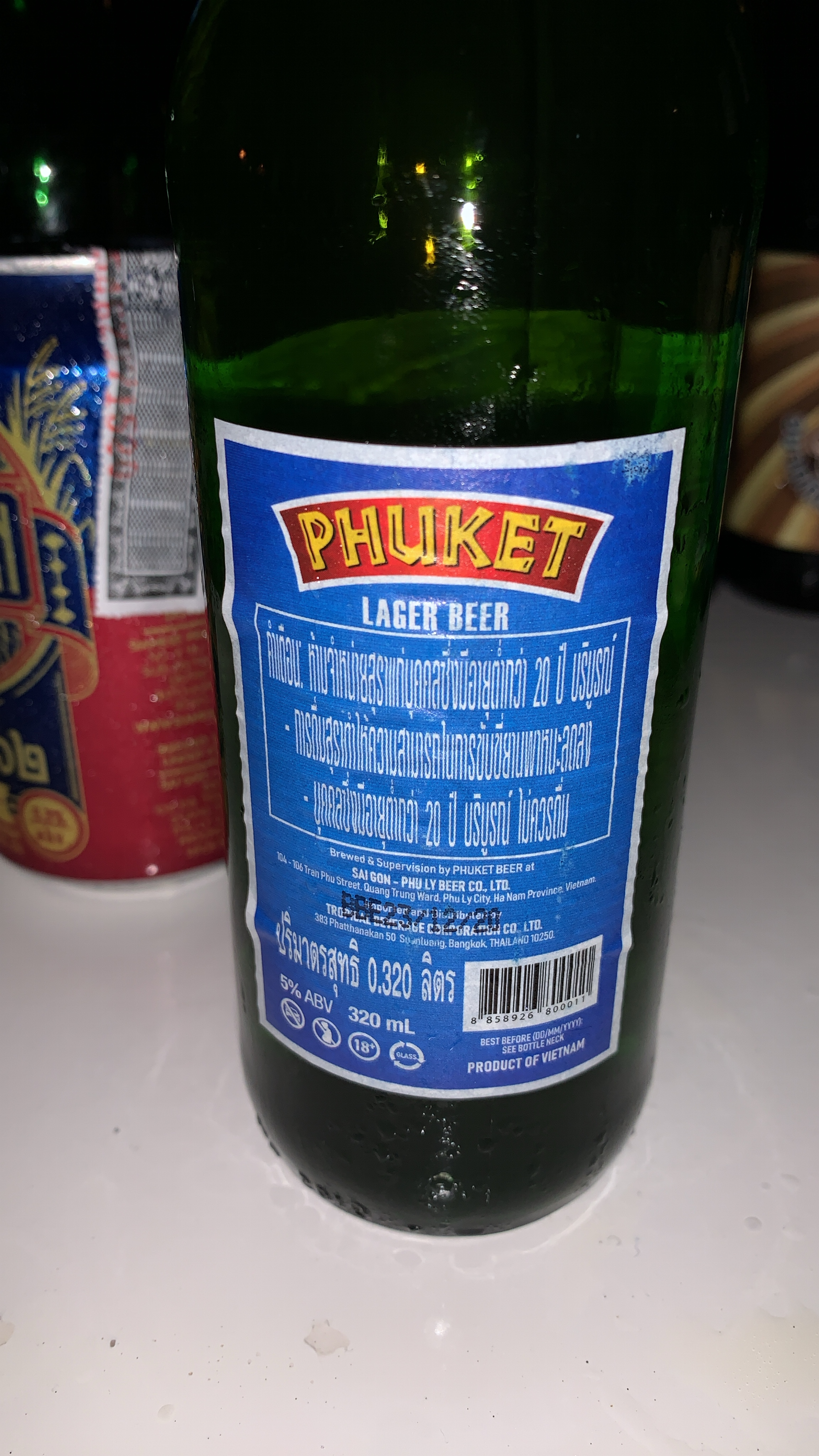
Label on a bottle of the well-known Thai craft beer Phuket says that it, indeed, was brewed in Vietnam, mostly due to strict laws on breweries

Two types of licenses are available in Thailand for would-be beer producers. Thailand's 1950 Liquor Act states that beer can only be made in a factory making more than 1,000,000 litres per year or in a brewpub producing at least 100,000 litres per year for sale on-site with no bottling permitted. Brewpub beers cannot be sold off-premises. The finance ministry in 2000 ruled that, for either type of producer to be legal, they must be a limited company with capital of at least 10 million baht. The maximum penalty for "home brewing" under the 1950 Liquor Act used to be 200 baht for making it and 5,000 baht for selling it. A new law passed by the National Legislative Assembly in December 2016 raised the maximum penalty for illegal production to 100,000 baht or a prison sentence of six months, or both. The maximum fine for selling illegal beer was raised to 50,000 baht. To sell craft beers off-premises, one small brewer explained, "We have two choices: Either hire an overseas factory to make it or build a factory abroad on our own,..." and import it.

Meanwhile, military-controlled ASEAN neighbour Myanmar, in January 2017, got its first craft beer microbrewery, "Burbrit". Its name is derived from "Burma" and "Britain", in recognition of British influence on Burma's brewing history.

== Thai industrial breweries ==
- Asia Pacific Breweries
- Boon Rawd Brewery
- Carlsberg
- Heineken
- Phuket Beer (San Miguel Brewery in Thailand, under supervision of Tropical Beverage Company.)
- San Miguel Brewery
- ThaiBev

== Gallery ==
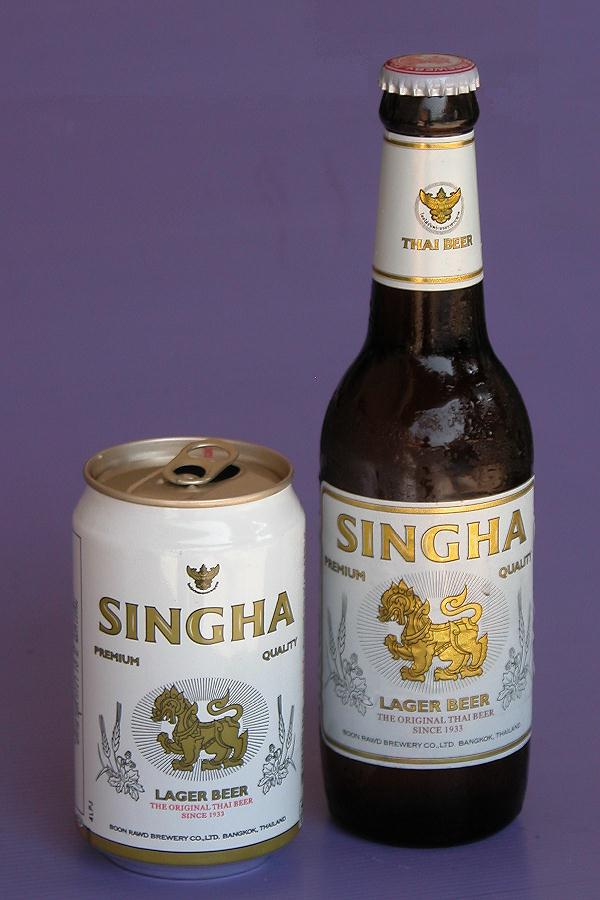
Singha

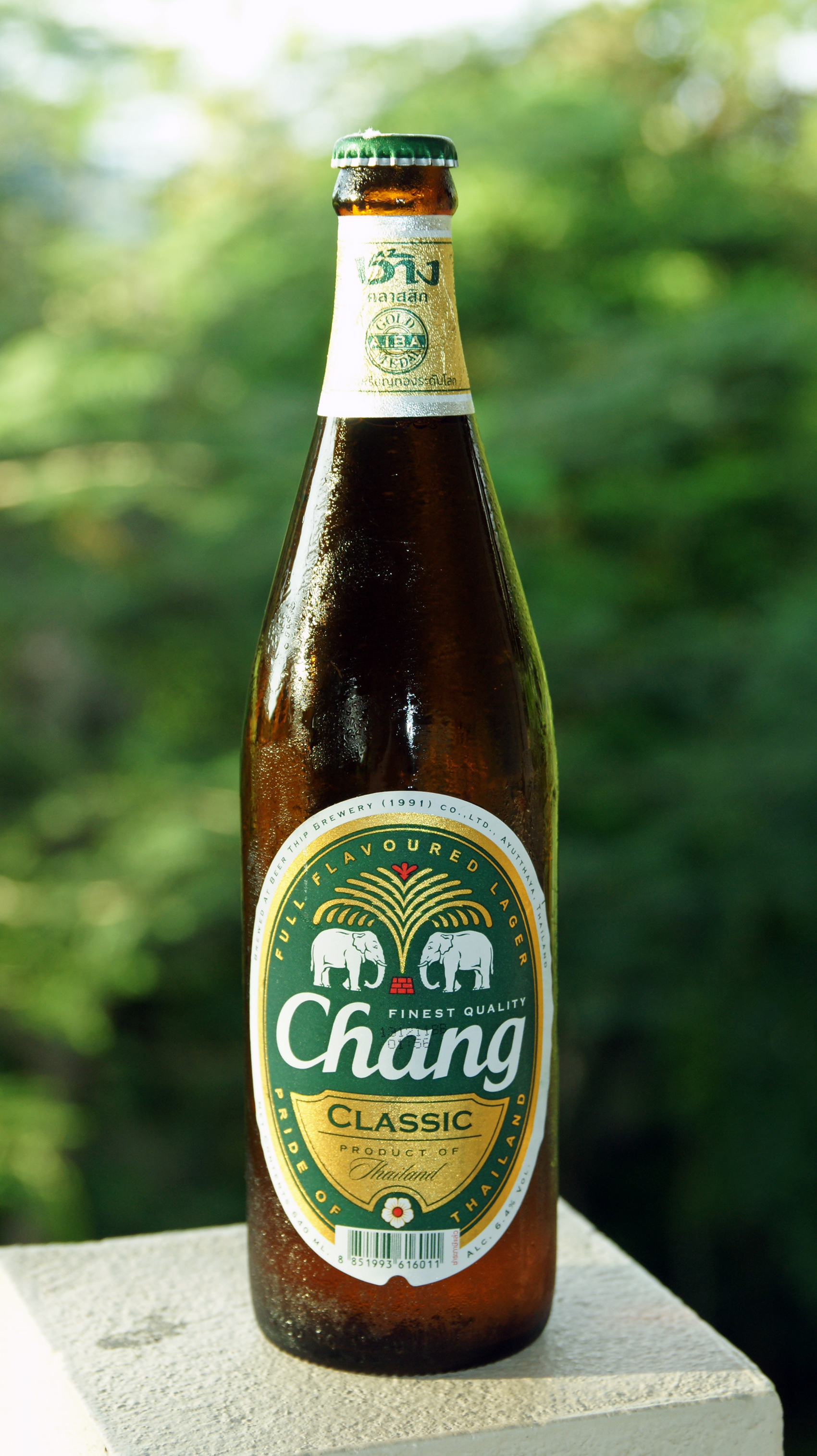
Chang beer

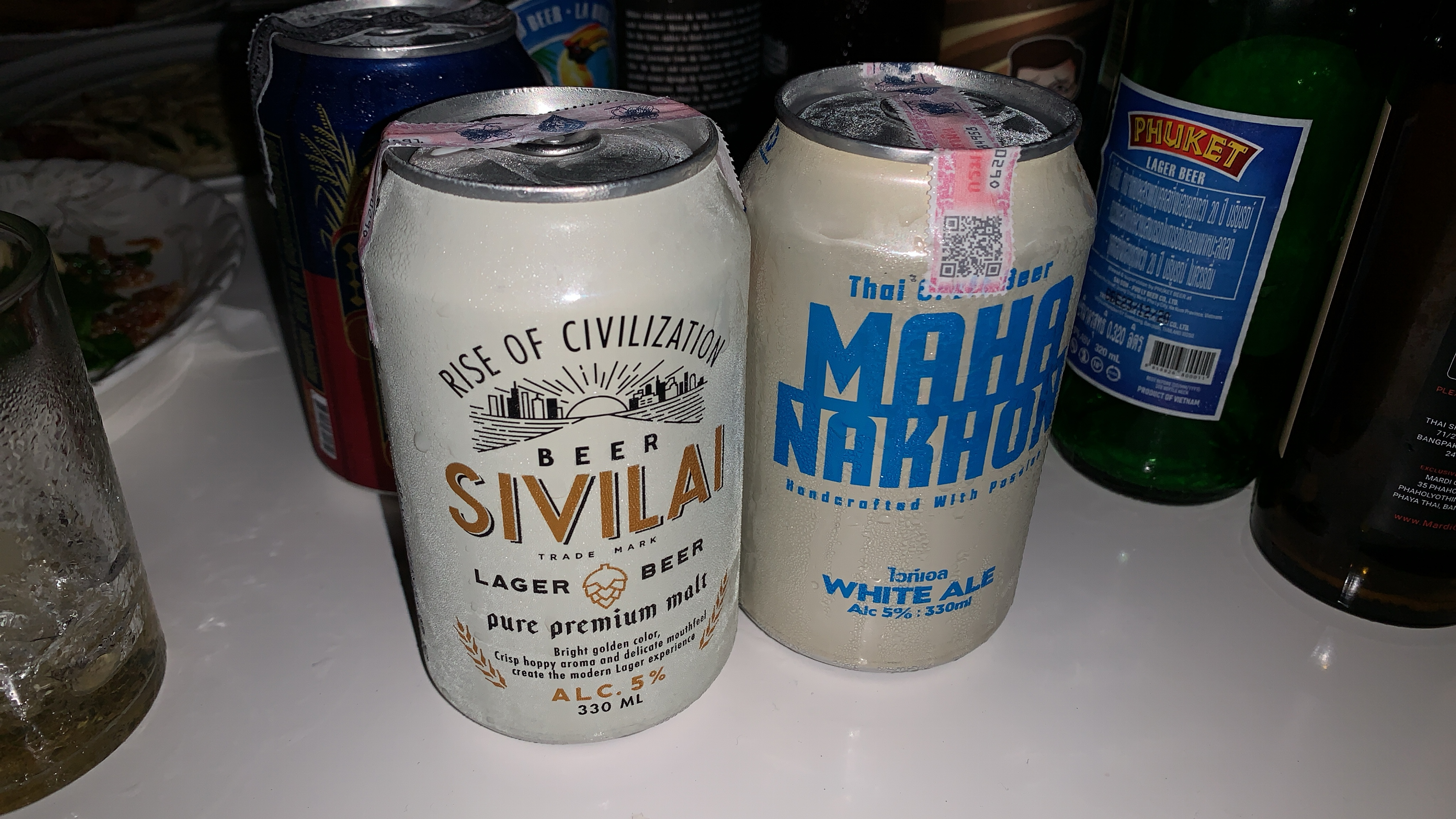
Sivilai and Mahanakhon, craft beer of Thailand

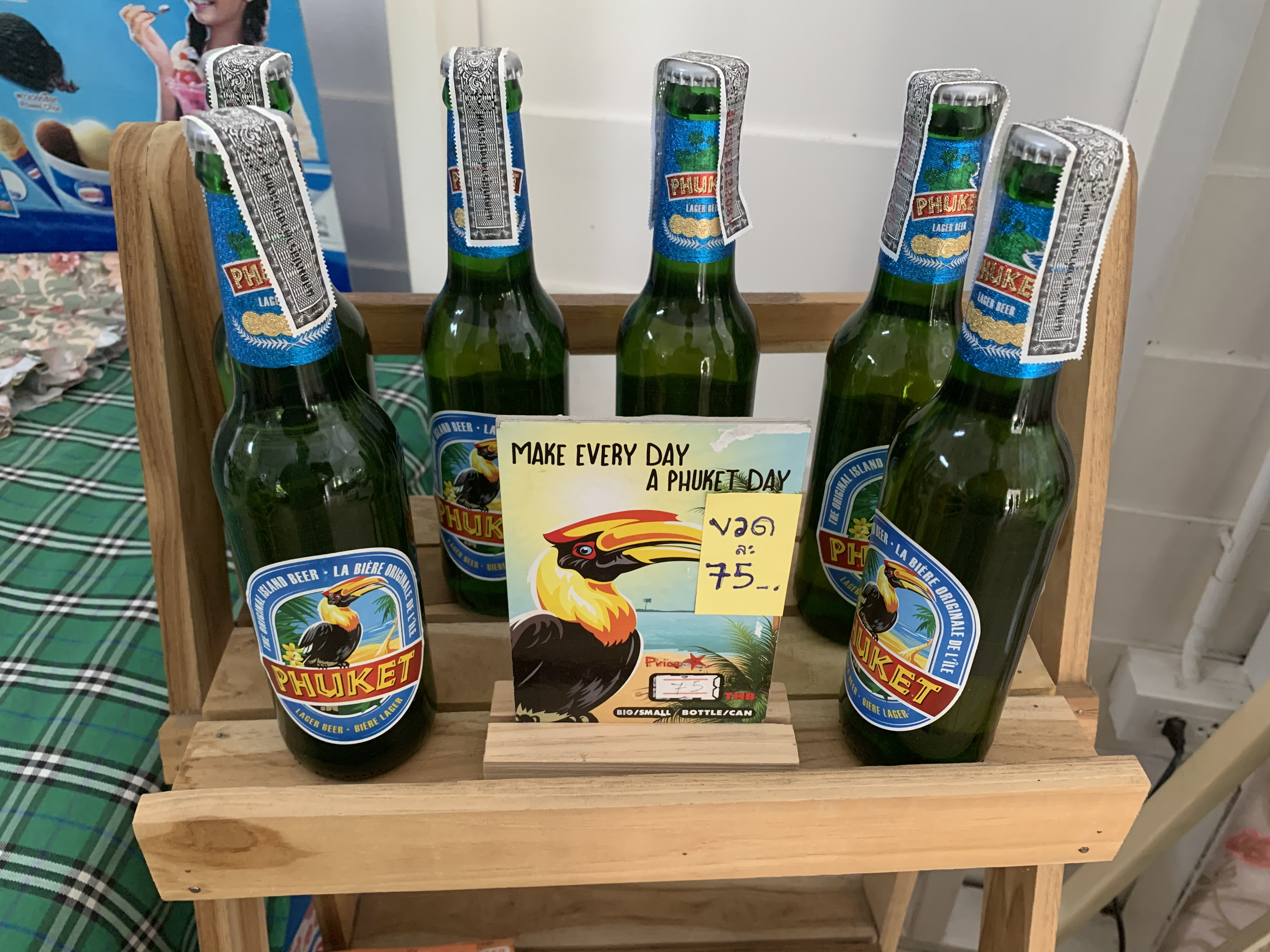
Phuket craft beer

== See also ==
- Beer and breweries by region
