= Vudha Bhirombhakdi =

Thai business executive

- Born: 13 May 1934 (age 91)
- Occupations: Business executive, sports shooter
- Known for: Chairman of Boon Rawd Brewery

Vudha Bhirombhakdi (Thai: วุฒา ภิรมย์ภักดี, born 13 May 1934) is a Thai business executive. He is a third-generation member of the Bhirombhakdi family, and is chairman of Boon Rawd Brewery, one of Thailand's largest beer corporations.

Vudha is the elder of two sons of Vidya Bhirombhakdi, the adopted son of the family patriarch Phraya Bhirombhakdi. He graduated in engineering from the HTL Bohne in Munich (now part of the Munich University of Applied Sciences), and joined the company overseeing its production facilities, as well as the construction of its Khon Kaen brewery. He is chairman, following the death of his uncle Chamnong in 2015, while his cousin Santi is CEO.

He is a former sports shooter. He won a silver medal in the trap event at the 1974 Asian Games, and competed in the mixed trap event at the 1984 Summer Olympics.

He was married to Khunying Oranuch Bhirombhakdi; they have four children: Vudtinun, Voravud, Nathawan Teepsuwan and Thanavud.
