= Chitpas Kridakorn =

Thai politician and activist

- จิตภัสร์ กฤดากร
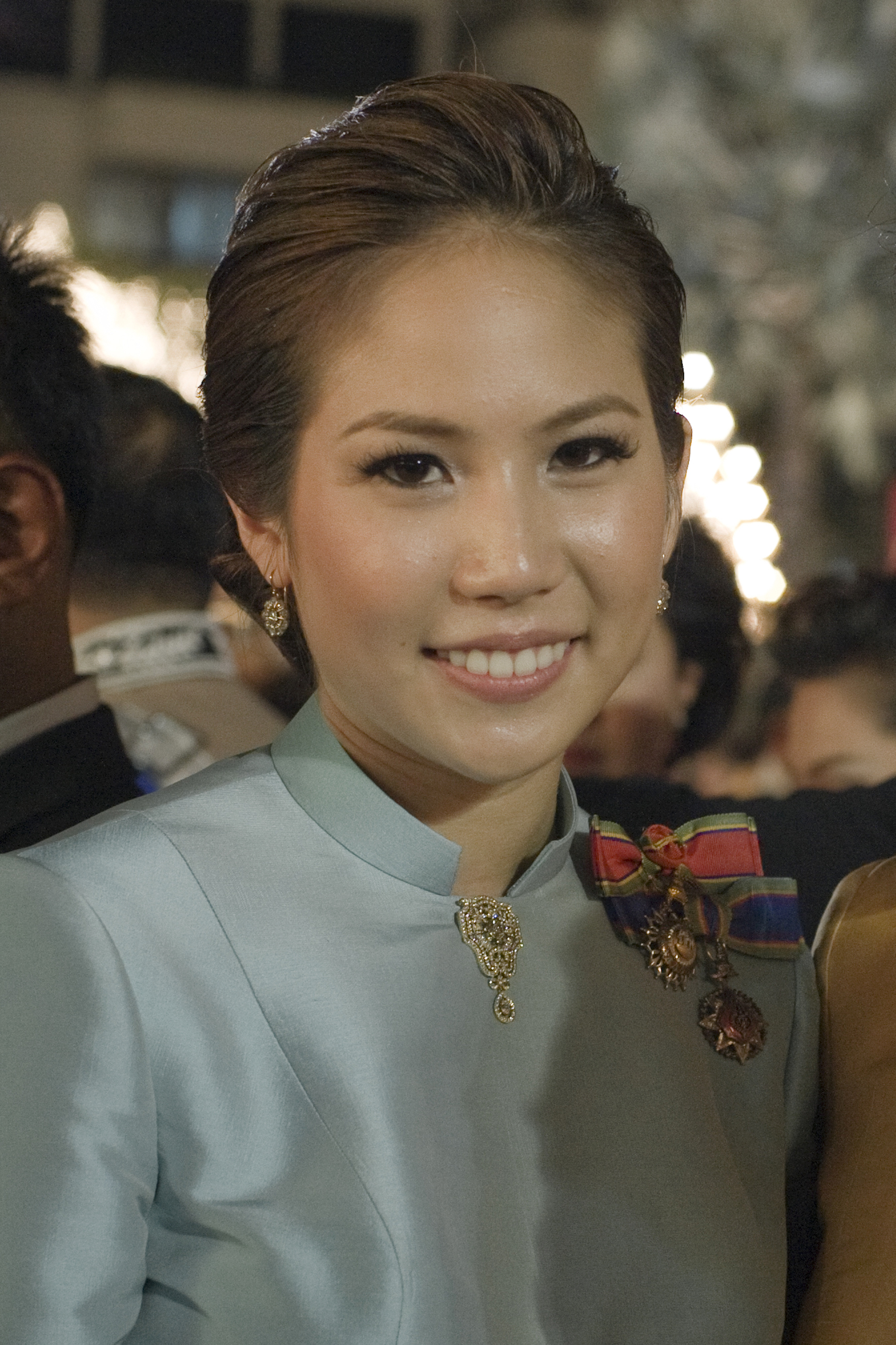
- Chitpas in 2010

Member of the House of Representatives
- In office 29 May 2019 – 20 Mar 2023

Personal details
- Born: Chitpas Bhirombhakdi; 16 June 1985 (age 41) Bangkok, Thailand
- Party: Democrat
- Parents: Chutinant Bhirombhakdi (father); Piyapas Bhirombhakdi (mother)
- Education: King's College London; Chulalongkorn University
- Occupation: Politician

Chitpas Kridakon (Thai: จิตภัสร์ กฤดากร, RTGS: Chitpas Kridakon; née Bhirombhakdi ภิรมย์ภักดี RTGS: Phiromphakdi, born 16 June 1985) is a Thai politician and activist. She was a member of the Thai House of Representatives from 2019 to 2023. Now Deputy Leader of the Democrat Party. Advisor of the Police's committee of the house of Thai representative's

== Family and education ==
Chitpas, also known under her nickname "Tant" (ตั๊น), was born in Bangkok as the eldest daughter of the wealthy Bhirombhakdi family. Her father Chutinant Bhirombhakdi is one of the heirs to the Boon Rawd Brewery fortune and CEO of the Singha Corporation, producing the beer brands Singha and Leo. Her grandfather Chamnong Bhirombhakdi was the president of Singha Corporation and was listed as number seven of the richest Thais by Forbes in 2011 with an estimated net worth of US$2 billion. Therefore, she is often referred to as the "Singha heiress" or "beer heiress" in Thai press. Chitpas' mother, Mom Luang Piyapas Bhirombhakdi née Kridakorn, is a distant member of the Thai royal family (great-great-granddaughter of King Mongkut) and actress, primarily known for her portrayal of Queen Suriyothai in the 2001 history film The Legend of Suriyothai. In 2017, the Asian edition of Tatler magazine chose Chitpas as number two of "Thailand's Most Eligible Ladies". Chitpas went to Chitralada School (the school attended by children of the Thai royal family) and Westonbirt School in England. She took a bachelor's degree in geography from King's College London in 2009, and a master's degree in public administration from Chulalongkorn University in 2014, as the valedictorian of her class.

== Political career ==
As a 23-year-old, she joined the Democrat Party and became a staff member of Niphon Promphan, who was secretary-general to prime minister Abhisit Vejjajiva. In December 2009, Chitpas caused controversy when she distributed advertising calendars of her family's Leo beer brand, depicting scantily clad models, at Government House. She resigned her position, but was hired for another government position as secretary to the minister of information and communication technology (ICT). In the 2011 parliamentary election, she ran as a constituency candidate for the Dusit and Ratchathewi districts of Bangkok, but lost. She then served as the deputy spokeswoman of the Democrat Party, that was the main opposition after the 2011 election. In this position, she called for a clampdown on websites insulting the monarchy, under the Thai lèse majesté law and Computer Crimes Act.

Chitpas joined the 2013 anti-government protests and became one of the prominent speakers and faces of the People's Democratic Reform Committee (PDRC), headed by former Democrat politician Suthep Thaugsuban. In an AFP report in mid-December 2013, Chitpas was quoted saying that many Thais lack a "true understanding of democracy ... especially in the rural areas." This provoked anger among government-supporting Red Shirts and inhabitants of the rural northeastern provinces, some of them starting to boycott Singha beer. Her home was attacked with Molotov cocktails. A week later, the Bhirombhakdi family prompted her to change her family name, in order to keep the Bhirombhakdi name and Boon Rawd Brewery out of the conflict. She chose to use her mother's maiden name, Kridakorn. The protests resulted in the May 2014 military coup, which Chitpas and other PDRC leaders celebrated with a party, wearing military-style outfits. After the coup, the PDRC transformed into the People's Democratic Reform Foundation (PDRF) with Chitpas serving as an assistant secretary.

In 2015, Chitpas applied for a position at the 191 Police patrol and special operations division of the Royal Thai Police. This met with strong opposition from some police officers, recalling her role in the storming of the Bangkok police headquarters during the 2013–2014 protests and charges of sedition against her. She withdrew her application. In 2018 she applied for legal aid from a justice ministry fund for low-income earners to provide bail during her criminal procedure for sedition. Her request was denied as she did not submit the necessary documents to prove she qualified for the aid.

Chitpas was chosen as the Democrat Party's deputy secretary in November 2018. In the 2019 parliamentary election, she ran as the Democrats' party-list candidate number 20. As the party won exactly 20 list seats, she was only just elected to the House of Representatives after an election rerun in Chiang Mai's 8th constituency.

In her mandatory asset disclosure filing in the new 2019 parliament, Chitpas listed 664.7 million baht in assets.
