= The Voice Thailand season 3 =

The Voice Thailand
- Season 3
- Hosted by: Songsit Rungnopphakhunsi; Rinrani Siphen
- Coaches: Saharat Sangkapreecha; Jennifer Kim; Joey Boy; Apiwat Eurthavornsuk
- Winner: Somsak Rinnairak
- Runner-up: Suthita Chanachaisuwan

Release
- Original network: Channel 3
- Original release: 7 September – 14 December 2014

Season chronology
- ← Previous; Season 2 Next → Season 4

The third series of The Voice เสียงจริงตัวจริง (also known as The Voice Thailand) on 7 September 2014. The show was hosted by Songsit Rungnopphakhunsi and Rinrani Siphen on Channel 3.

== Teams ==
Colour key

- Winner
- Runners-up
- Third place
- Fourth place
- Eliminated in the Live shows
- Eliminated in the Knockouts
- Artist was stolen by another coach in the Battle rounds (Name is strike-throughed)
- Eliminated in the Battles

Coach	Artists				
Saharat Sangkhapricha					
Saharat Sangkhapricha	Panchaphon Thammason	Niwirin Limkangwanmongkhon	Banthita Prachamon	Thiraphap Kramonmanit	Kittiphop Ratchakrom
Saharat Sangkhapricha	Ratchata Sombatlaptrakun	Chananthon Sichatwong	Supharaphon Talalak	~~Chitsamon Chattrakhom~~	~~Aphaphat Phumiphak~~
Saharat Sangkhapricha	Chalisa Tungkhatecha	Khwankaeo Khongnisai	Sarawut Songliam & Thatchai Tuthong	Mana Ngamchue	
Jennifer Kim					
Jennifer Kim	Somsak Rinnairak	Phlengpraphan Kingthong	Palirat Konbang	Annawari Rivollon	Natthaphat Chiraniwat
Jennifer Kim	Pakon Phosaengda	Thuradi Arirop	Surachai Malaiya	~~Chananthon Sichatwong~~	~~Phatsaranan Atsatamongkhon~~
Jennifer Kim	Raphiphan Tosi	Suranat Chokchoho	Chakhri Ngo-prasit	Khlueathip Krachangphot	
Joey Boy					
Joey Boy	Charunwit Phuaphanwatthana	Prangthip Thalaeng	Kulitsala Sakunrat	Ingrid Witzany	Sasiwimon Chainaphanphiphat
Joey Boy	Panot Rueangrattanachinda	Phatsaranan Atsatamongkhon	Aphaphat Phumiphak	~~Khanittha Rasisai~~	~~Supharaphon Talalak~~
Joey Boy	~~Surachai Malaiya~~	Suphakit Kanlayanakun	Ketsarin Chaemnut	Chalothon Thit-at	
Aphiwat Uea-thawonsuk					
Aphiwat Uea-thawonsuk	Suthita Chanachaisuwan	Kunchira Khongthong	Suchat Saeheng	Panithan Thanchai	Chatuphit Prasongdi & Chawanan Sinuan
Aphiwat Uea-thawonsuk	Phakin Itsarakun	Khanittha Rasisai	Chitsamon Chattrakhom	~~Thuradi Arirop~~	Chaowalit Phonsimma
Aphiwat Uea-thawonsuk	Chanutiphon Nanthakan	Nawaphon Rotsomchit	Sutthiphat Sutthiwanit	Khita Wangkhachonwutthisak & Anuson Prasit	

== The Blind Auditions ==
=== Episode 1: Blind Auditions, Week 1 ===
The first blind audition episode was broadcast on 7 September 2014.

Group performance: The voice Thailand's Coach - We Will Rock You / We Are The Champions

Key	Coach hit his/her "I WANT YOU" button	Artist eliminated with no coach pressing his or her "I WANT YOU" button	Artist defaulted to this coach's team	Artist elected to join this coach's team

Order	Contestant	Song	Coaches' and Contestants' Choices			
Order	Contestant	Song	Kong	Kim	Joey	Stamp
1	Pawin Rattanasawettakun _{27, from Chiang Mai}	"Better Man" _{originally by Robbie Williams}	—	—	—	—
2	Supharaphon Talalak _{26, from Nakhon Pathom}	"มนต์รักลูกทุ่ง" _{originally by Phraiwan Lukphet}		—		—
3	Panithan Thanchai _{20, from Sakon Nakhon}	"สีเทา" _{originally by Boyd Kosiyabong Feat. Mariam Alkalali}				
4	Palirat Konbang _{16, from Samut Prakan}	"Safe & Sound" _{originally by Taylor Swift}	—			
5	Phakin Itsarakun _{43, from Bangkok}	"You Are So Beautiful" _{originally by Joe Cocker}		—	—	
6	Prangthip Thalaeng _{20, from Chiang Rai}	"สาวนาสั่งแฟน" _{originally by Pumpuang Duangjan}				
7	Pakon Phosaengda _{31, from ฺBangkok}	"เกิดมาแค่รักกัน" _{originally by Big Ass}	—		—	—
8	Charunwit Phuaphanwatthana _{21, from Samut Prakan}	"99 Problems" _{originally by Hugo}		—		

=== Episode 2: Blind Auditions, Week 2 ===
The second blind audition episode was broadcast on 14 September 2014.

Key	Coach hit his/her "I WANT YOU" button	Artist eliminated with no coach pressing his or her "I WANT YOU" button	Artist defaulted to this coach's team	Artist elected to join this coach's team

Order	Contestant	Song	Coaches' and Contestants' Choices			
Order	Contestant	Song	Kong	Kim	Joey	Stamp
1	Somsak Rinnairak _{22, from Chiang Rai}	"ป่านนี้" _{originally by Nanthida Kaeobuasai}	—		—	—
2	Phanuphan Charitsue _{19, from Phra Nakhon Si Ayutthaya}	"รักล้นใจ" _{originally by Phaibunkiat Khiaokaeo}	—	—	—	—
3	Banthita Prachamon _{25, from Bangkok}	"I Can't Make You Love Me" _{originally by Bonnie Raitt}				
4	Sutthiphat Sutthiwanit _{21, from Bangkok}	"Creep" _{originally by Radiohead}		—		
5	Khwankaeo Khongnisai _{33, from Bangkok}	"รักไม่รู้ดับ" _{originally by Sawali Phakaphan}		—	—	—
6	Thipsuda Niyomkiatphaisan _{22, from Phuket}	"What You Have Done For Me" _{originally by Janet Jackson}	—	—	—	—
7	Panot Rueangrattanachinda _{40, from Bangkok}	"Misty" _{originally by Ella Fitzgerald}		—		
8	Arirat Wongnamyam _{24, from Bangkok}	"The Lazy Song" _{originally by Bruno Mars}	—	—	—	—
9	Kittiphop Ratchakrom _{19, from Bangkok}	"Lost Stars" _{originally by Adam Levine}		—	—	
10	Chananthon Sichatwong _{30, from Bangkok}	"Grenade" _{originally by Bruno Mars}	—			—
11	Suchat Saeheng _{28, from Songkhla}	"ตัดใจ" _{originally by Venus}				

=== Episode 3: Blind Auditions, Week 3 ===
The third blind audition episode was broadcast on 21 September 2014

Key	Coach hit his/her "I WANT YOU" button	Artist eliminated with no coach pressing his or her "I WANT YOU" button	Artist defaulted to this coach's team	Artist elected to join this coach's team

Order	Contestant	Song	Coaches' and Contestants' Choices			
Order	Contestant	Song	Kong	Kim	Joey	Stamp
1	Khita Wangkhachonwutthisak & Anuson Prasit _{25 and 23, from Bangkok}	"ถ้าปล่อยให้เธอเดินผ่าน" _{originally by Groove Riders}		—	—	
2	Suriyakun Phromsen _{16, from Chiang Rai}	"เรื่องจริง" _{originally by Singular}	—	—	—	—
3	Niwirin Limkangwanmongkhon _{17, from Pattani}	"ไม่เป็นไรเลย" _{originally by Nouveau}		—	—	
4	Sasiwimon Chainaphanphiphat _{16, from Bangkok}	"ความรักเจ้าขา" _{originally by Pensri Poomchoosri}				
5	Korawit Lekphet _{30, from Saraburi}	"หลับตา" _{originally by Charat Feuang-arom}	—	—	—	—
6	Sarawut Songliam & Thatchai Tuthong _{27 and 26, from Bangkok and Phetchabun}	"ไม่รักไม่ต้อง" _{originally by New-Jiew}			—	—
7	Kulitsara Sakunrat _{19, from Nakhon Ratchasima}	"ขอเพียงที่พักใจ" _{originally by Maliwan Jimena}	—			
8	Nattaphat Chiraniwat _{22, from Songkhla}	"มือปืน" _{originally by Pongsit Kamphee}	—		—	—
9	Nawaphon Rotsomchit _{20, from Pathum Thani}	"ขออุ้มหน่อย" _{originally by Thongchai McIntyre}		—	—	
10	Ingrid Witzany _{21, from Bangkok}	"น้ำตาฟ้า" _{originally by Samthon}		—		

=== Episode 4: Blind Auditions, Week 4 ===
The fourth blind audition episode was broadcast on 28 September 2014

Key	Coach hit his/her "I WANT YOU" button	Artist eliminated with no coach pressing his or her "I WANT YOU" button	Artist defaulted to this coach's team	Artist elected to join this coach's team

Order	Artist	Song	Coach's and artist's choices			
Order	Artist	Song	Kong	Kim	Joey	Stamp
1	Chanutiphon Nanthakan _{27, from Ubon Ratchathani}	"สิ่งที่ไม่เคยบอก" _{originally by Modern Dog}				
2	Phatcharida Thiranon & Siwanat Bunbin _{21, from Bangkok}	"Treasure" _{originally by Bruno Mars}	—	—	—	—
3	Khanittha Rasisai _{20, from Bangkok}	"คนที่ไม่เข้าตา" _{originally by Calories Blah Blah}		—		
4	Thirarat Sichomkhwan _{33, from Bangkok}	"เสียงที่ไม่ได้ยิน" _{originally by Sound Walker}	—	—	—	—
5	Thiraphap Kramonmanit _{27, from Kanchanaburi}	"เรือเล็กควรออกจากฝั่ง" _{originally by Bodyslam}		—	—	—
6	Chitsamon Chattrakhom _{25, from Bangkok}	"ใครสักคน" _{originally by Marsha Vadhanapanich}		—	—	—
7	Raphiphan Tosi _{23, from Unknown}	"Because of You" _{originally by Kelly Clarkson}			—	
8	Sawit Intharanukunkit & Patthanan Arunwichitsakun _{26 and 19, from Bangkok}	"เก็บดาว" _{originally by Boyd Kosiyabong Feat. Sunthon & Marisa}	—	—	—	—
9	Surachai Malaiya _{29, from Mukdahan}	"เจ็บนิดเดียว" _{originally by Nittaya Bunsungnoen}	—	—		—
10	Ratchata Sombatlaptrakun _{38, from Bangkok}	"อยากรู้นัก" _{originally by Rewat Buddhinan}		—	—	—
11	Phlengpraphan Kingthong _{25, from Bangkok}	"Have I Told You Lately" _{originally by Rod Stewart}	—		—	

=== Episode 5: Blind Auditions, Week 5 ===
The fifth blind audition episode was broadcast on 5 October 2014

Key	Coach hit his/her "I WANT YOU" button	Artist eliminated with no coach pressing his or her "I WANT YOU" button	Artist defaulted to this coach's team	Artist elected to join this coach's team

Order	Contestant	Song	Coaches' and Contestants' Choices			
Order	Contestant	Song	Kong	Kim	Joey	Stamp
1	Sakuna Khotchanin _{26, from Lampang}	"ไม่ลืม" _{originally by Bird Ka Heart}	—	—	—	—
2	Mana Ngamchue _{28, from Chiang Mai}	"กะลา" _{originally by Modern Dog}		—	—	—
3	Chatuphit Prasongdi & Chawanan Sinuan _{21 and 26, from Chonburi and Nakhon Pathom}	"Super Bass" _{originally by Nicki Minaj}		—		
4	Chakhri Ngo-prasit _{22, from Kamphaeng Phet}	"As Long As You Love Me" _{originally by Justin Bieber}	—		—	—
5	Thuradi Arirop _{33, from Sakon Nakhon}	"Fallin'" _{originally by Alicia Keys}		—	—	
6	Khananat Wattanakaruna _{24, from Bangkok}	"ก่อน" _{originally by Modern Dog}	—	—	—	—
7	Panchaphon Thammason _{16, from Chiang Rai}	"เดือนเพ็ญ" _{originally by Caravan}		—		—
8	Claudia Krause _{18, from Phuket}	"Skinny Love" _{originally by Bon Iver}	—	—	—	—
9	Phatsaranan Atsatamongkhon _{19, from Nakhon Pathom}	"Back to December" _{originally by Taylor Swift}				
10	Annawari Rivollon _{24, from Saraburi}	"Zombie" _{originally by The Cranberries}	—		—	—
11	Suthita Chanachaisuwan _{16, from Bangkok}	"Falling Slowly" _{originally by Glen Hansard & Markéta Irglová}	—			

=== Episode 6: Blind Auditions, Week 6 ===
The last blind audition episode was broadcast on 12 October 2014

Key	Coach hit his/her "I WANT YOU" button	Artist eliminated with no coach pressing his or her "I WANT YOU" button	Artist defaulted to this coach's team	Artist elected to join this coach's team

Order	Contestant	Song	Coaches' and Contestants' Choices			
Order	Contestant	Song	Kong	Kim	Joey	Stamp
1	Thamon Khongnakhon _{16, from Bangkok}	"Royals" _{originally by Lorde}	—	—	—	—
2	Ketsarin Chaemnut _{27, from Bangkok}	"When I'm Feeling Blue" _{originally by Sarinthip Hanpradit}	—	—		—
3	Chaowalit Phonsimma _{25, from Bangkok}	"รักต้องสู้" _{originally by Carabao}	—	—	—	
4	Suranat Chokchoho _{25, from Unknown}	"ขอให้รักบังเกิด" _{originally by Pramot Wilepana}	—		—	—
5	Chalisa Tungkhatecha _{17, from Unknown}	"สิ่งมีชีวิตที่เรียกว่าหัวใจ" _{originally by ETC.}		—	—	—
6	Chalothon Thit-at _{20, from Uttaradit}	"คาใจ" _{originally by Jetrin Wattanasin}	—	—		—
7	Nipun Prakritphong _{23, from Bangkok}	"อยู่ไป ไม่มีเธอ" _{originally by Blackhead}	—	—	—	—
8	Anyamani Mangmi _{17, from Nonthaburi}	"Stay" _{originally by Palmy}	—	—	—	—
9	Aphaphat Phumiphak _{24, from Bangkok}	"โอ้ใจเอย" _{originally by Phichika Chittaputta}				
10	Ardawan Habibzadeh _{20, from Bangkok}	"Love Will Keep Us Alive" _{originally by Eagles}	—N/a	—	—	—
11	Suphakit Kanlayanakun _{36, from Chonburi}	"ฟลอร์เฟื่องฟ้า" _{originally by Winai Chunlabutsapa}	—N/a	—		—
12	Khlueathip Krachangphot _{21, from Phatthalung}	"ไกลแค่ไหน คือ ใกล้" _{originally by Getsunova}	—N/a		—N/a	—
13	Kunchira Khongthong _{23, from Bangkok}	"เพียงรัก" _{originally by Silly Fools}	—N/a	—N/a	—N/a	

== Battle Rounds ==
This year's battle rounds featured a new "steal" twist. After each battle round the losing artist then pitched to the other three coaches on why they should join their team. It was then up to the coaches (who have a limited amount of time) to press their red button to steal the artist. They could press their button as many times as they liked but were only allowed to steal two artists. If more than one coach wanted to steal the same artist then it was up to the artist to decide which team to join.

The battle round advisors were Kong working with Saowani Nawaphan, Kim with Wichian Tantiwimonphan, Joey boy with Narongwit Techathanawat and Stamp with Suthi Saengserichon.

=== Episode 7-10: Battle Rounds ===
Battle Rounds was broadcast on 19 October 2014, 26 October 2014, 2 November 2014 and 9 November 2014.

– Coach hit his/her "I WANT YOU" button
– Artist defaulted to this coaches team
– Artist elected to join this coaches team
– Battle winner
– Battle loser
- Battle loser but was saved by another coach

Date	Order	Team	Winner	Song	Loser	Coaches and artists choices			
Date	Order	Team	Winner	Song	Loser	Kong	Kim	Joey	Stamp
Episode 7 (19 October 2014)	1	Stamp	Kunchira Khongthong	"ไม่รักดี" _{originally by Pepper Jam}	Sutthiphat Sutthiwanit	—	—	—	—N/a
Episode 7 (19 October 2014)	2	Kim	Palirat Konbang	"เธอ" _{originally by Cocktail}	Phatsaranan Atsatamongkhon	—	—N/a	✔	—
Episode 7 (19 October 2014)	3	Joey	Panot Rueangrattanachinda	"Love Never Felt So Good" _{originally by Michael Jackson}	Ketsarin Chaemnut	—	—	—N/a	—
Episode 7 (19 October 2014)	4	Stamp	Panithan Thanchai	"รักแรกพบ" _{originally by Tattoo Colour}	Nawaphon Rotsomchit	—	—	—	—N/a
Episode 7 (19 October 2014)	5	Kong	Ratchata Sombatlaptrakun	"ม้าเหล็ก" _{originally by Amphol Lumpoon}	Mana Ngamchue	—N/a	—	—	—
Episode 7 (19 October 2014)	6	Joey	Ingrid Witzany	"สุดใจ" _{originally by Pongsit Kamphee}	Surachai Malaiya	—	✔	—N/a	—
Episode 8 (26 October 2014)	1	Kim	Phlengpraphan Kingthong	"Counting Stars" _{originally by OneRepublic}	Chakhri Ngo-prasit	—	—N/a	—	—
Episode 8 (26 October 2014)	2	Joey	Prangthip Thalaeng	"Music Lover" _{originally by Marsha Vadhanapanich}	Supharaphon Talalak	✔	—	—N/a	—
Episode 8 (26 October 2014)	3	Kim	Somsak Rinnairak	"ไม่อาจเปลี่ยนใจ" _{originally by Rueangsak Loichusak}	Suranat Chokchoho	—	—N/a	—	—
Episode 8 (26 October 2014)	4	Stamp	Chatuphit Prasongdi & Chawanan Sinuan	"บูมเมอแรง" _{originally by Thongchai McIntyre}	Khita Wangkhachonwutthisak & Anuson Prasit	—	—	—	—N/a
Episode 8 (26 October 2014)	5	Kong	Panchaphon Thammason	"หนึ่งมิตรชิดใกล้" _{originally by Isn't}	Chitsamon Chattrakhom	—N/a	—	—	✔
Episode 8 (26 October 2014)	6	Joey	Charunwit Phuaphanwatthana	"รุนแรงเหลือเกิน" _{originally by Micro}	Chalothon Thit-at	—	—	—N/a	—
Episode 9 (2 November 2014)	1	Kim	Annawari Rivollon	"Can't Fight The Moon Light" _{originally by LeAnn Rimes}	Raphiphan Tosi	—	—N/a	—	—
Episode 9 (2 November 2014)	2	Kong	Niwirin Limkangwanmongkhon	"คุณและคุณเท่านั้น" _{originally by Thanathat Chaiya-at}	Sarawut Songliam & Thatchai Tuthong	—N/a	—	—	—
Episode 9 (2 November 2014)	3	Kim	Pakon Phosaengda	"กะทันหัน" _{originally by Suppharut Techatanon, Bongkot Charoentham and Lowfat}	Chananthon Sichatwong	✔	—N/a	✔	✔
Episode 9 (2 November 2014)	4	Kong	Thiraphap Kramonmanit	"ฉันอยู่ตรงนี้" _{originally by Black Head}	Khwankaeo Khongnisai	—N/a	—	—	—
Episode 9 (2 November 2014)	5	Stamp	Suthita Chanachaisuwan	"Torn" _{originally by Ednaswap}	Chanutiphon Nanthakan	—N/a	—	—	—N/a
Episode 9 (2 November 2014)	6	Joey	Sasiwimon Chainaphanphiphat	"ขวัญของเรียม/แสนแสบ" _{originally by Songsi Johnson/Charin Nanthanakhon}	Suphakit Kanlayanakun	—N/a	—	—N/a	—
Episode 10 (9 November 2014)	1	Kong	Banthita Prachamon	"รักแท้...ยังไง" _{originally by Chiranat Yusanon}	Chalisa Tungkhatecha	—N/a	—	—	—
Episode 10 (9 November 2014)	2	Joey	Kulitsala Sakunrat	"Cross Love" _{originally by Lula & Norongwit Techathanawat}	Khanittha Rasisai	—N/a	—	—N/a	✔
Episode 10 (9 November 2014)	3	Kim	Natthaphat Chiraniwat	"ความรัก" _{originally by bodyslam}	Khlueathip Krachangphot	—N/a	—N/a	—	—N/a
Episode 10 (9 November 2014)	4	Stamp	Phakin Itsarakun	"รักคุณเข้าแล้ว" _{originally by Boyd Kosiyabong Feat. Thanachai Utchin}	Thuradi Arirop	—N/a	✔	—	—N/a
Episode 10 (9 November 2014)	5	Kong	Kittiphop Ratchakrom	"Way Back Into Love" _{originally by Hugh Grant & Haley Bennett}	Aphaphat Phumiphak	—N/a	—N/a	✔	—N/a
Episode 10 (9 November 2014)	6	Stamp	Suchat Saeheng	"ขีดเส้นใต้" _{originally by Songsit Rungnopphakhunsi}	Chaowalit Phonsimma	—N/a	—N/a	—N/a	—N/a

== Knock outs ==
– Knockout winner
– Eliminated artist

=== Episode 11-12: Knockouts ===
Knockouts was broadcast on 16 November 2014 and 23 November 2014

Date	Team	Order	Artist	Song	Result
Episode 11 (16 November 2014)	Kong	1	Niwirin Limkangwanmongkhon	"ขอจันทร์"	Advanced
Episode 11 (16 November 2014)	Kong	2	Supharaphon Talalak	"โบว์รักสีดำ"	Eliminated
Episode 11 (16 November 2014)	Kong	3	Chananthon Sichatwong	"Irreplaceable"	Eliminated
Episode 11 (16 November 2014)	Kong	4	Thiraphap Kramonmanit	"มุมมืด"	Advanced
Episode 11 (16 November 2014)	Kim	5	Natthaphat Chiraniwat	"Hero"	Eliminated
Episode 11 (16 November 2014)	Kim	6	Palirat Konbang	"Pretty Boy"	Advanced
Episode 11 (16 November 2014)	Kim	7	Pakon Phosaengda	"พูดทำไม"	Eliminated
Episode 11 (16 November 2014)	Kim	8	Somsak Rinnairak	"ก้อนหินก้อนนั้น"	Advanced
Episode 11 (16 November 2014)	Joey	9	Phatsaranan Atsatamongkhon	"Tie a Yellow Ribbon Round the Ole Oak Tree"	Eliminated
Episode 11 (16 November 2014)	Joey	10	Ingrid Witzany	"สาวเทคนิค"	Advanced
Episode 11 (16 November 2014)	Joey	11	Panot Rueangrattanachinda	"I'll Never Love This Way Again"	Eliminated
Episode 11 (16 November 2014)	Joey	12	Charunwit Phuaphanwatthana	"หมดเวลา"	Advanced
Episode 11 (16 November 2014)	Stamp	13	Khanittha Rasisai	"คนมีคู่ไม่รู้หรอก"	Eliminated
Episode 11 (16 November 2014)	Stamp	14	Suthita Chanachaisuwan	"ใจนักเลง"	Advanced
Episode 11 (16 November 2014)	Stamp	15	Chatuphit Prasongdi & Chawanan Sinuan	"I Think I (Thai Version)"	Eliminated
Episode 11 (16 November 2014)	Stamp	16	Suchat Saeheng	"กุมภาพันธ์"	Advanced
Episode 12 (23 November 2014)	Kong	1	Kittiphop Ratchakrom	"Love Someone"	Eliminated
Episode 12 (23 November 2014)	Kong	2	Panchaphon Thammason	"ขอบคุณแฟนเพลง"	Advanced
Episode 12 (23 November 2014)	Kong	3	Banthita Prachamon	"Eternal Flame"	Advanced
Episode 12 (23 November 2014)	Kong	4	Ratchata Sombatlaptrakun	"คำมักง่าย"	Eliminated
Episode 12 (23 November 2014)	Stamp	5	Panithan Thanchai	"เกือบ"	Advanced
Episode 12 (23 November 2014)	Stamp	6	Chitsamon Chattrakhom	"ความลับ"	Eliminated
Episode 12 (23 November 2014)	Stamp	7	Phakin Itsarakun	"น้ำตาแสงใต้"	Eliminated
Episode 12 (23 November 2014)	Stamp	8	Kunchira Khongthong	"To Love Somebody"	Advanced
Episode 12 (23 November 2014)	Joey	9	Kulitsala Sakunrat	"อายแสงนีออน"	Advanced
Episode 12 (23 November 2014)	Joey	10	Prangthip Thalaeng	"องศาเดียว"	Advanced
Episode 12 (23 November 2014)	Joey	11	Aphaphat Phumiphak	"เมื่อคืนนี้ฉันฝันถึงคุณ"	Eliminated
Episode 12 (23 November 2014)	Joey	12	Sasiwimon Chainaphanphiphat	"ลืม"	Eliminated
Episode 12 (23 November 2014)	Kim	13	Annawari Rivollon	"Make You Feel My Love"	Advanced
Episode 12 (23 November 2014)	Kim	14	Phlengpraphan Kingthong	"ฝน"	Advanced
Episode 12 (23 November 2014)	Kim	15	Thuradi Arirop	"รักเท่าไหร่ก็ยังไม่พอ"	Eliminated
Episode 12 (23 November 2014)	Kim	16	Surachai Malaiya	"อาจจะเป็นคนนี้"	Eliminated

== Live performance ==
=== Episode 13: Live Playoff, Week 1 ===
Broadcast on 30 November 2014

– Advanced artist
– Eliminated artist

Order	Team	Artist	Song	Public Voting	Result
1	Stamp	Panithan Thanchai	"ตัดสินใจ"	14%	Eliminated
2	Stamp	Suthita Chanachaisuwan	"Beautiful"	37%	Advanced
3	Stamp	Suchat Saeheng	"เขียนถึงคนบนฟ้า"	32%	Eliminated
4	Stamp	Kunchira Khongthong	"All My Loving"	17%	Eliminated
5	Joey	Kulitsala Sakunrat	"All About That Bass"	14%	Eliminated
6	Joey	Ingrid Witzany	"ปักษ์ใต้บ้านเรา"	22%	Eliminated
7	Joey	Prangthip Thalaeng	"หม้ายขันหมาก"	21%	Eliminated
8	Joey	Charunwit Phuaphanwatthana	"ไม่กล้าบอกเธอ"	43%	Advanced

Non-competition performances
Order	Performers	Song
1	Stamp and Stamp's member	"ล้มบ้างก็ได้ / ที่แห่งนี้ / หัวใจผูกกัน"
2	Joey and Joey's member	"พรหมลิขิต"

=== Episode 14: Live Playoff, Week 2 ===
Onair 7 December 2014

Key
– Advanced
– Eliminated

Order	Team	Artist	Song	Public Voting	Result
1	Kong	Thiraphap Kramonmanit	"เพื่อเธอ"	13%	Eliminated
2	Kong	Niwirin Limkangwanmongkhon	"รบกวนมารักกัน"	17%	Eliminated
3	Kong	Panchaphon Thammason	"ความคิด"	43%	Advanced
4	Kong	Banthita Prachamon	"At Last"	27%	Eliminated
5	Kim	Somsak Rinnairak	"หลงตัวเอง"	57%	Advanced
6	Kim	Annawari Rivollon	"Wrecking Ball"	9%	Eliminated
7	Kim	Palirat Konbang	"A Tu Corazon สู่กลางใจเธอ"	13%	Eliminated
8	Kim	Phlengpraphan Kingthong	"All Of Me"	21%	Eliminated

Non-competition performances
Order	Artist	Song
14.1	Artist of The Voice	"ทรงพระเจริญ"
14.2	Nouveau and Artist of The Voice	"Nouveau's medley song"
14.3	Kong and Kong's Member	"เธอผู้ไม่แพ้"
14.4	Kim and Kim's Member	"สิ่งสำคัญ"

=== Episode 15: Final Live Performance ===
Broadcast on 14 December 2014

Key

Winner Runner-up Third Place Fourth Place

Coach	Artist	Order	Song that artist sing with coach	Order	Song	Voting	Result
Stamp	Suthita Chanachaisuwan	1	"รักปอนปอน/ข้อความ"	6	"Stay With Me/All I Want"	25%	Runner-Up
Kong	Panchaphon Thammason	2	"แทนคำนั้น"	5	"รักเธอทั้งหมดของหัวใจ"	14%	Fourth Place
Kim	Somsak Rinnairak	3	"Charan Manophet's medley song"	8	"สักวันต้องได้ดี"	43%	Winner
Joey	Charunwit Phuaphanwatthana	4	"ความเชื่อ"	7	"รักเดียว/เสมอ"	18%	Third Place

Non-competition performances
Order	Artist	Song
15.1	Modern Dog	Medley Song Modern Dog

=== Result of Live Performance ===
Artist member

- Kong's member
- Kim's member
- Joey's member
- Stamp's member

Color

- Winner
- Runner-Up
- Third Place
- Fourth Place
- Advance Artist
- Elimination Artist
- No performance this week

Result
Artist	Live Playoff week 1	Live Playoff week 2	Finals
Somsak Rinnairak		Advanced	Winner
Suthita Chanachaisuwan	Advanced		Runner-Up
Charunwit Phuaphanwatthana	Advanced		Third Place
Panchaphon Thammason		Advanced	Fourth Place
Banthita Prachamon		Eliminated	Elimination (Live Playoff week 2)
Niwirin Limkangwanmongkhon		Eliminated	Elimination (Live Playoff week 2)
Thiraphap Kramonmanit		Eliminated	Elimination (Live Playoff week 2)
Palirat Konbang		Eliminated	Elimination (Live Playoff week 2)
Phlengpaphan Kingthong		Eliminated	Elimination (Live Playoff week 2)
Annawari Rivollon		Eliminated	Elimination (Live Playoff week 2)
Panithan Thanchai	Eliminated	Elimination (Live Playoff week 1)	
Suchira Khonthong	Eliminated	Elimination (Live Playoff week 1)	
Suchat Saeheng	Eliminated	Elimination (Live Playoff week 1)	
Prangthip Thalaeng	Eliminated	Elimination (Live Playoff week 1)	
Ingrid Witzany	Eliminated	Elimination (Live Playoff week 1)	
Kulitsala Sakunrat	Eliminated	Elimination (Live Playoff week 1)	
