= Bhirombhakdi family =

Thai business family

Bhirombhakdi ภิรมย์ภักดี
- Parent family: Sreshthaputra family
- Current region: Bangkok
- Origin: Bangkok, Thailand
- Founder: Phraya Bhirombhakdi
- Current head: Santi Bhirombhakdi
- Connected families: House of Pavitra; House of Kritakara
- Properties: Boon Rawd Brewery

The Bhirombhakdi family (Thai: ภิรมย์ภักดี) is a Thai business family of partial Chinese descent. A branch of the Sreshthaputra family, the family traces its origins to Phraya Bhirombhakdi (personal name Boonrawd Sreshthaputra, 1872–1950), who founded the country's first brewery in 1933. Today, the family continues to own the Boon Rawd Brewery group, best known for its Singha beer, as well as other associated businesses. The family, led by Boonrawd's grandson Santi, is ranked by Forbes as the fourteenth richest person in Thailand as of 2019.

Boonrawd, the family patriarch, had three sons who survived into adulthood: Vidya (a nephew he took as an adopted son); Prachuab (with his second wife Kim); and Chamnong (with his third wife Chimlim). He had three children with his first wife Khunying Lamai, though all died in infancy.

Boonrawd's elder biological son Prachuab succeeded him as head of the business, and became known as Thailand's first brewmaster. Prachuab had five children, of whom two sons, Piya and Santi, became closely involved in the business. They took over after Prachuab's death in 1993, and expanded the business amidst growing competition in the Thai beer industry. Piya later left to establish PB Valley Khao Yai Winery, and Santi became head of the family business. Santi's two sons, Bhurit and Piti are now actively involved in its management.

== People ==
Members of the family include:

- Phraya Bhirombhakdi (Boonrawd Sreshthaputra), family patriarch and founder of Boon Rawd Brewery
  - Vidya Bhirombhakdi, Boonrawd's adopted son
    - Vudha Bhirombhakdi
      - Vudtinun Bhirombhakdi, married to Varitda Bhirombhakdi
        - Bongkotthip Bhirombhakdi
      - Voravud Bhirombhakdi, married to Nandhamalee Bhirombhakdi
        - Nandhavud Bhirombhakdi
        - Voranan Bhirombhakdi
      - Nathawan Teepsuwan
      - Thanavud Bhirombhakdi
    - Vapee Bhirombhakdi
      - Palit Bhirombhakdi
      - Soravij Bhirombhakdi
      - Piyajit Osathananda
      - Pavin Bhirombhakdi
  - Prachuab Bhirombhakdi, Boonrawd's elder biological son
    - Piya Bhirombhakdi
    - Santi Bhirombhakdi
      - Bhurit Bhirombhakdi
      - Piti Bhirombhakdi, married to Woranuch Bhirombhakdi
      - Preerati Bhirombhakdi
  - Chamnong Bhirombhakdi, Boonrawd's younger biological son
    - Chutinant Bhirombhakdi, married to Piyapas Bhirombhakdi
      - Chitpas Kridakorn
      - Nantaya Bhirombhakdi
      - Naiyanobh Bhirombhakdi
    - Chiranuj Bhirombhakdi
      - Sunit "Pi" Scott, married to Lapassalan "Mild" Jiravechsoontornkul
      - Siranudh "Psi" Scott
