= Bhurit Bhirombhakdi =

Fourth-generation businessman of Singha Corporation

- Born: January 12, 1977 (age 49); Bangkok, Thailand
- Other name: Tae
- Occupation: Businessman
- Title: Group Chief Executive Officer; Boon Rawd Brewery Co., Ltd.; Chief Executive Officer; Boon Rawd Trading Co., Ltd.; Chief Executive Officer; Singha Worldwide PTE. Ltd.; Chairman Singha Venture Capital Fund Ltd.
- Spouse: Nisamanee Bhirombhakdi
- Children: Nisa Bhirombhakdi the best Nakrit Bhirombhakdi
- Father: Santi Bhirombhakdi
- Relatives: Woranuch Bhirombhakdi (sister-in-law)

Bhurit Bhirombhakdi (Thai: ภูริต ภิรมย์ภักดี, RTGS: Phurit Phiromphakdi; born 12 January 1977) is a fourth generation family member of the Thai business conglomerate family, the Bhirombhakdi. The family created Thailand's first beer brewery called Boon Rawd Brewery which produces the Singha Beer. He is the eldest son of Santi and Arunee Bhirombhakdi and is married to Nisamanee (Tong) Bhirombhakdi. He has two children, Nisa Bhirombhakdi and Nakrit (Singha) Bhirombhakdi. He is currently Boon Rawd Brewery's group chief executive officer and manages Boon Rawd Group's businesses and subsidiaries.

== Education ==
Bhurit attended grade school up until the second year high school at Satit Prasarnmit. He then finished high school at the Wilbraham & Monson Academy in Massachusetts. He later finished his bachelor's degree with a Business Management concentration from Bentley College in Boston.

== Career ==
After his graduation at the age of 21, he started helping his family's business as an employee in the brewer tank department. In order to understand the brewery business, he furthered his education to become a Brewmaster from the Doemens Institute of Technology, one of the oldest brewery institutions in the world. Bhurit is the third Brewmaster from the Bhirombhakdi family after his grandfather, Prachuab Bhirombhakdi (Thailand's first Brewmaster) and his uncle, Piya Bhirombhakdi. He later came back to Thailand and decided to intern with one of the world's biggest marketing agencies, Ogilvy & Mather, to educate and train himself in marketing and advertising.

After the completion of his internship, he rejoined the family business in the marketing department as a starting level brand manager. He then pursued a Master of Business Administration with a Marketing and Entrepreneurship concentration from Sasin Graduate Institute of Business Administration of Chulalongkorn University.

In 2004, Bhurit joined Boon Rawd Brewery Co. as the Business Development and Non-Alcohol Products Marketing Director. In 2010, he was promoted to the Boon Rawd Brewery's board of directors. Again in 2016, he was promoted to chief executive officer of the marketing and distribution arms of the company.

Aside from his responsibilities in beer, soda, and drinking water products; he was also responsible for creating products such as LEO No. 8, Singha Reserve, Singha Lemon Soda, Mashita Seaweed, and Purra Mineral Water. In addition, he also started many new business relationships and joint ventures. Examples include collaborating with Singha Kameda, a distributor of Japanese styled rice crackers, Thai Korean Seaweed, the manufacturer of Mashita Seaweed, and most recently, a venture with PTT Oil and Retail Business Public Company Limited, to manufacture and distribute new RTD beverages.

In 2018, he founded Singha Ventures Capital Fund, which is the Corporate Venture Capital investing arm of Boon Rawd Brewery. He is the chairman of the executive board. In 2020, Bhurit was selected by the board of directors, as the CEO of Singha Worldwide PTE, appointed chairman of the Board of Vara Food & Drink Co., Ltd., and promoted to executive vice president of Boon Rawd Brewery Co., Ltd.

In September 2022, the Boon Rawd Brewery Group's board of directors unanimously selected Bhurit as the group company's new chief executive officer to lead and to guide the company forward into the future.

== Interest ==
Aside from his various roles and responsibilities, Bhurit is also a supporter of various extreme sports in Thailand. He is the current president of the Thailand Extreme Sports Association.
