= Siranudh Scott =

Thai marine conservationist

- สิรณัฐ สก๊อต
- Born: 21 August 1996 (age 30)
- Education: California Institute of the Arts
- Occupation: Marine conservationist
- Family: Bhirombhakdi

Siranudh "Psi" Scott (Thai: สิรณัฐ "ทราย" สก๊อต; born 21 August 1996) is a Thai marine conservationist and former advisor to Athapol Charoenshunsa, the Director-General of Thailand's Department of National Parks. He is known for his viral criticism of tourism operations in Southern Thailand's national parks, including environmental misconduct and corruption.

He is known as "Merman" to Thai locals. In 2023 he set a new open sea swim record and became the youngest person in Asia to swim unassisted across 50 kilometers, spanning three coastal provinces in southern Thailand: Krabi, Phang Nga, and Phuket. This extraordinary achievement establishes him as the first record holder in Asia. Siranudh's swim is verified by The Department of Marine Coastal Resources, in Thailand (DMCR).

== Early life and education ==
Siranudh was born on 21 August 1996. He is the son of Chiranuj Bhirombhakdi, and grandson of Chamnong Bhirombhakdi and Khunying Supatcharee Bhirombhakdi, née Rattakul ( Her older brother is Bhichai Rattakul). He is therefore a member of the Bhirombhakdi family who owns Boon Rawd Brewery, known for its Singha beer brand. His father, Suthit Ivar Scott, is Scottish and was already divorced from his wife at the time of his birth. He currently operates a private charter boat service on the Chao Phraya River. He attended Bangkok Patana School, graduating in 2014. He attended the California Institute of the Arts, graduating with a BFA in animation in 2018.

While studying in the United States, his relationship with his mother became strained following the death of his grandfather. After graduating from university, he moved to the United Kingdom to live with his father and worked as a salesperson at a Disney Store. In 2020, he resumed his master's degree studies. However, he was unhappy during his studies. Following the outbreak of the COVID-19 pandemic, he returned to Thailand, citing a desire to be closer to his family and a reluctance to remain abroad during the pandemic.

== Career ==
Siranudh became involved in marine conservation after returning from abroad. He began organizing beach cleanups with local communities, initially working on small stretches of coastline in Prachuap Khiri Khan and later in Krabi. He subsequently established Sea You Strong, a volunteer group that organized marine conservation activities and community cleanups.

In April 2023, Siranudh led the Sea You Strong project in a 70-kilometre swim across three provinces on the Andaman coast, from Krabi through Phang Nga to Phuket. He swam part of the route with 36 volunteer swimmers. The project was organized with government marine and national park agencies and was intended to encourage public participation in marine conservation.

On 2 January 2024, he was appointed as an unpaid adviser to the director-general of the Department of National Parks, Wildlife and Plant Conservation. His duties included providing advice and coordinating work on marine environmental conservation and carrying out assignments from the director-general.

In April 2025, following a controversy involving his conduct toward foreign tourists on a boat in southern Thailand, Siranudh announced that he would end his role with the Department of National Parks. The department later said that his advisory appointment was expected to end on 30 September 2025.

In 2025, Sea You Strong was developed into the Sea You Strong Foundation (มูลนิธิชีวาสมุทร). The foundation was formally registered in Krabi and was later published in the Royal Gazette. Its stated objectives include supporting marine ecosystem conservation and restoration, promoting public awareness of marine conservation, and encouraging participation in environmental activities.

In August 2025, the foundation publicly launched its first major project, the Suea Phu Phithak (เสื้อผู้พิทักษ์, "Guardian Shirt") project. The project involved artists designing shirts featuring Thai national parks, with proceeds intended to fund life insurance for national park personnel. The initial plan covered personnel in five national parks.

In May 2026, Siranudh said that Charoen Pokphand had provided 1 million baht to support the foundation's project to purchase life insurance for national park protection officers.

In 2025, Siranudh also entered the entertainment industry. He took part in his first fashion show as a model and made his acting debut in the film The Reunion (เลี้ยงรุ่น).

== Controversies ==
=== "Ni hao" controversy and resignation ===
In April 2025, Siranudh posted a video confronting two Russian tourists who had directed the Chinese phrase "ni hao" at him in Krabi. The video led to public outcry over the treatment of workers in Thailand's tourism industry, and allegations that the phrase was racist.

On 12 April 2025, Siranudh resigned from his position. On 19 April 2025, Department of National Parks staff listed 6 allegations against Siranudh, including "frequently reprimanded tourists, guides, boat operators, and local business owners" and "regularly posted content on his personal platforms showcasing apparent involvement in official marine conservation activities". On 21 April 2025, the Department of National Parks was set to dismiss him from his advisory position, citing "inappropriate behavior".

=== Sexual abuse allegations ===
In May 2026, Scott posted a video on Facebook accusing his elder brother, Sunit “Pi” Scott, who is six years older than him, of sexually abusing him during his childhood. He subsequently posted another audio clip containing a mix of Thai and English, referring to a recording that he said provided evidence of his older brother’s admission of guilt. He claimed the abuse happened repeatedly over several years, beginning when he was around 10 or 11 years old.

He said that the experience of incest had a profound impact on his relationships later in life.

On 19 May 2026, Boon Rawd Brewery issued a statement expressing regret to Scott and said that his brother had left the company. The statement said the brewery would cooperate with relevant agencies in examining the facts.

Prior to this incident, he disclosed on a television program that he had been sexually abused by his nanny during his childhood. His mother subsequently filed a lawsuit against him under Thailand’s law on ungrateful child, alleging that he had exposed a family scandal and seeking to reclaim the inheritance that his grandfather had given him.

He said in interview that the alleged sexual abuse occurred from when he was 9 to 13 years old, every time his brother returned home from boarding school for the summer.In addition, his older brother also forced or tricked him into taking drugs.

He told reporters that three years ago, after he informed his family about the abuse, they urged him to remain silent to preserve the family’s reputation and asked him to sign a confidentiality agreement rather than protect him.

In July, Scott’s mother withdrew her "ungrateful child" lawsuit against her son before the third mediation session. In her filing, she requested reconciliation within the family, saying that the dispute was a family matter.

In a statement, she said, "This mother is ready to talk, as long as we speak with love and genuine goodwill towards one another." She added that she was "ready to respect and accept" the judicial process regarding the matter between her sons and expressed hope that "the truth will come to light and fairness will be served to both of my children".

On 8 July, the Phra Khanong Civil Court granted her request to withdraw the lawsuit and ordered the case removed from the court docket. The withdrawal followed mediation between Scott and his mother. Scott said afterward that he intended to continue pursuing criminal proceedings against his older brother over the alleged sexual abuse.

== Political activities ==
Siranudh has participated in protests concerning Israel and foreign influence in Thailand. In September 2025, he took part in a protest outside the Israeli Embassy in Bangkok concerning Israel's actions in the Gaza war.

On 10 September 2026, Siranudh joined a demonstration led by Sondhi Limthongkul outside the Israeli Embassy in Bangkok. The demonstration, held under the slogan "Take Back Our Thailand" (เอาประเทศไทยของเราคืนมา), called for foreign visitors to respect Thai laws and for the government to address foreign businesses using Thai nominees and other issues involving foreign ownership and land. Siranudh spoke at the event and said that he was participating as a Thai citizen concerned about the country's sovereignty and natural resources.

At the demonstration, Siranudh said that he viewed Israel as one of several issues involving foreign influence in Thailand and criticized the government over what he described as the loss of Thai control over land and natural resources. He also said that he was not participating as a member of a political faction but as a Thai citizen concerned about the country.

== Personal life ==
Siranudh has publicly acknowledged on multiple occasions during television appearances that he identifies as bisexual and is a supporter of the LGBTQ+ community.

== Filmography ==
=== Film ===
Year	Title	Role	Notes	Ref.
2025	The Reunion		Supporting role	

== Music videos ==
Year	Title	Singer	Ref.
2025	แค่อยากอ้อน (Hug me)	CHABABIE	
