= Lampoon =

Lampoon may refer to:

- Parody, a satirical imitative creative work
- Amphol Lampoon (born 1963), Thai actor and singer
- The Harvard Lampoon, an American humor magazine
  - National Lampoon (magazine), an American humor magazine
    - National Lampoon, Incorporated, an American mass media company

== See also ==
- National Lampoon (disambiguation)
