= Suthita Chanachaisuwan =

Thai singer

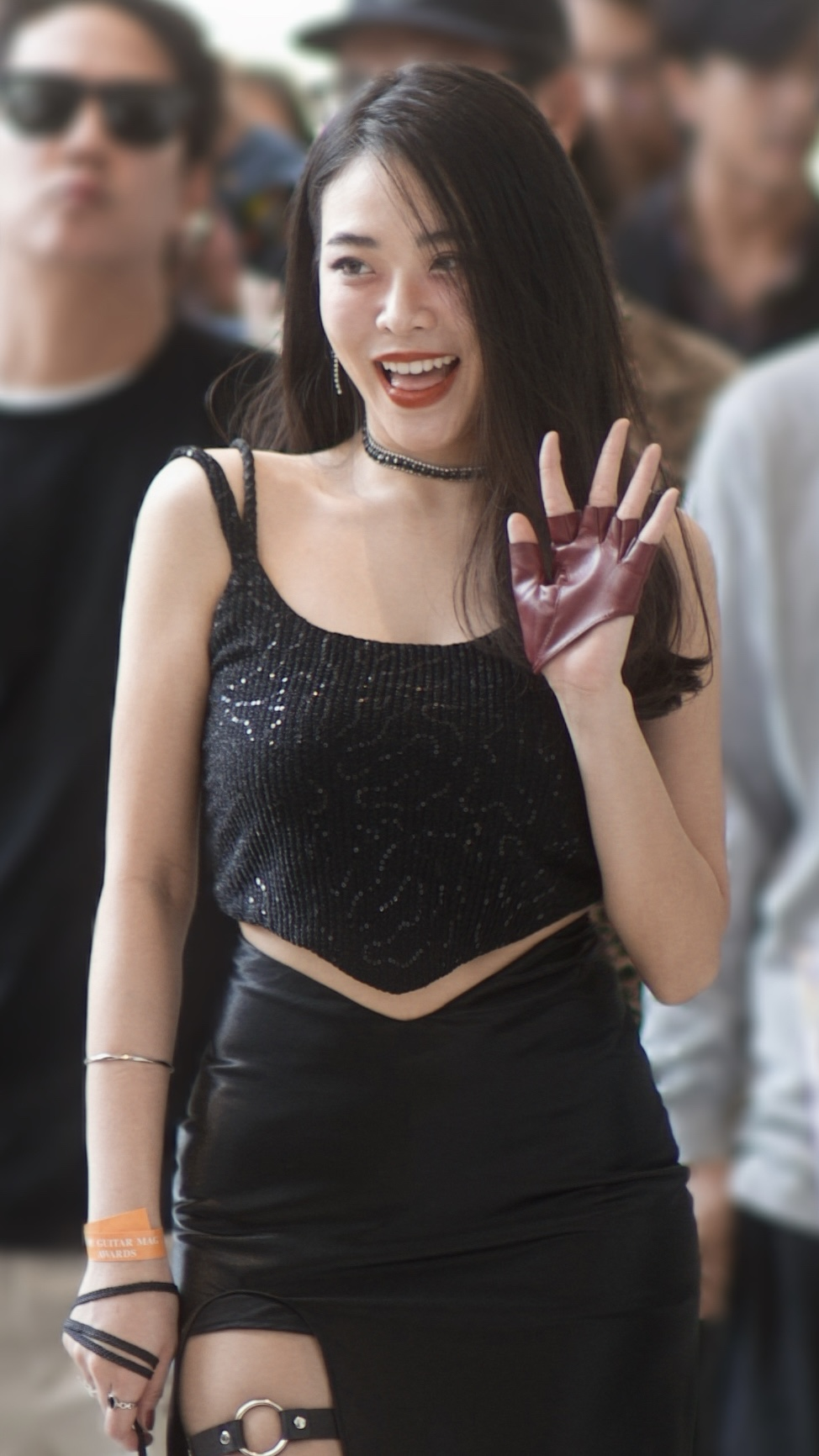
- Suthita in 2025
- Born: January 28, 1998 (age 28); Bangkok, Thailand
- Other name: Image TheVoice
- Occupation: Singer
- Years active: 2014–present

Suthita Chanachaisuwan (Thai: สุธิตา ชนะชัยสุวรรณ, born 28 January 1998), nicknamed Image, is a Thai singer. She became known from her participation in the third season of the singing competition The Voice Thailand in 2014, where she finished as first runner-up.

== Biography ==
Suthita auditioned for The Voice at the age of 16, when she was studying at Samsenwittayalai School. She competed under the team of Coach Stamp (Apiwat Eurthavornsuk), of whom she was a fan, and finished as first runner-up. She has since become one of the show's better-known contestants. Following the show's conclusion, she made covers of several popular songs, collaborated with Apiwat as well as other artists, and appeared as guest singer in several concerts. She wrote and released her first single, "Not a Goodbye" (an English-language song), in 2017, and recorded "Mong Chan Tee" (Look at Me), the theme song to the film Bad Genius, the same year. She is (as of 2017) currently studying economics at Thammasat University.

== Filmography ==
=== Television ===
- 2017 Songkram Pleng (2017) (Gun Pakdeevijit/3SD28) as Asara Kittithanyapat (Ays)
- 2021 The Messenger (Anda99/PPTVHD36) as Da With Chinawut Indracusin

=== MC ===
==== Television ====
- 20 : On Air

==== Online ====
- 20 : On Air YouTube:

== Discography ==
All Suthita singles:
No	Date	Channel	Name
1	Mar 15, 2017	Image Suthita	Not A GoodBye
2	Jul 26, 2018	SMALLROOM	ใจเย็น (Still)
3	Jan 28, 2019	SMALLROOM	Unlucky
4	Mar 22, 2019	LIPTAofficial	เหงา
5	Jan 14, 2020	SMALLROOM	เข้าใจ
6	Jan 28, 2021	SMALLROOM	ไม่มี (Blank)
7	Jun 9, 2021	SMALLROOM	Film
8	Dec 29, 2021	SMALLROOM	Sad New Year
9	Mar 31, 2022	SMALLROOM	Your Song
10	Jul 7, 2022	SMALLROOM	ความฝัน
11	Nov 22, 2022	SMALLROOM	BFF
12	Dec 14, 2023	SMALLROOM	ให้ดาวช่วยปลอบประโลมหัวใจของเธอให้หายดี

All Suthita Original Soundtracks:
No	Date	Channel	Name
1	Apr 20, 2017	GMM GRAMMY OFFICIAL	มองฉันที Ost.ฉลาดเกมส์โกง
2	Mar 16, 2018	GMM25MUSIC	เราและนาย OST. Love Song Love Series ตอน "เราและนาย"
3	Mar 19, 2018	Ch3Thailand Music	ไม่ใช่คนเดิม Ost.คมแฝก
4	Apr 30, 2018	GMM GRAMMY OFFICIAL	ผิดไหมที่รักเธอ (เพลงประกอบละคร เมืองมายา LIVE ตอน มายารัก ON LIE)
5	Jan 22, 2019	GMMTV RECORDS	เกมล่าเธอ Ost.WOLF
6	Feb 26, 2019	M Studio	เหลือวิญญาณก็จะรัก (เพลงประกอบภาพยนตร์ แสงกระสือ)
7	Mar 15, 2021	Ch3Thailand Music	#Saveme Ost.บาปอยุติธรรม
8	May 10, 2021	Ch3Thailand Music	ใจเอ๋ย Ost.พราวมุก
9	Aug 7, 2023	Ch3Thailand Music	จม Ost.เกมรักทรยศ
10	Sep 15, 2023	Ch3Thailand Music	Alone Ost.The Betrayal (เกมรักทรยศ)
11	Nov 1, 2023	YYDS Entertainment	ไม่มีวันกลับมา (Never) เพลงประกอบซีรีส์ หอมกลิ่นความรัก
