= Chitralada School =

School in Bangkok, Thailand

- โรงเรียนจิตรลดา
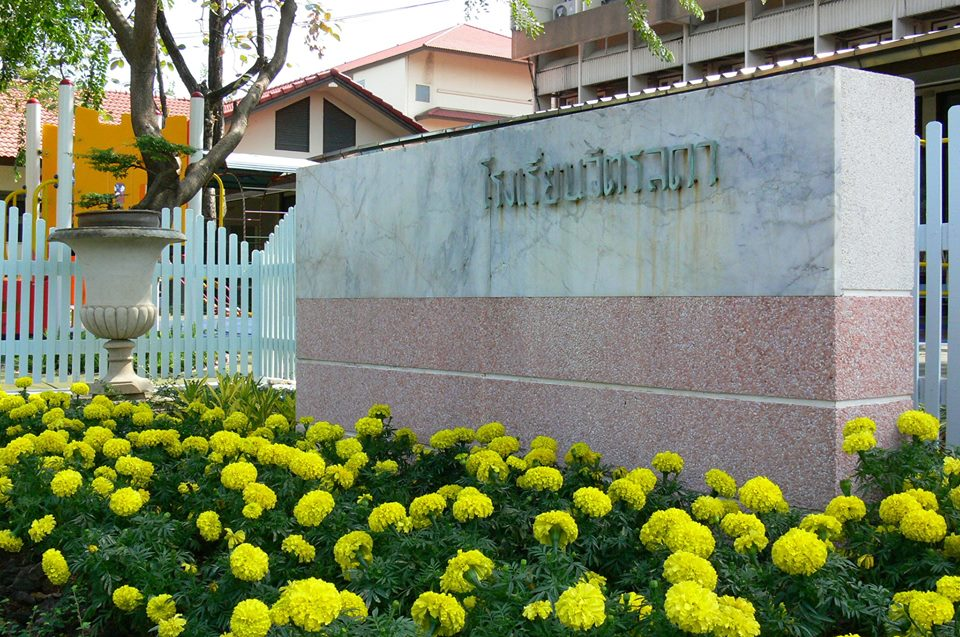

Location
- Chitralada Royal Villa, Dusit Palace Rajavithi Road, Suan Chitralada, Dusit Bangkok 10303

Information
- Established: January 10, 1955

The Chitralada School (Thai: Thai: โรงเรียนจิตรลดา; RTGS: Rongrian Chitralada) is a school established by King Bhumibol Adulyadej on the grounds of Chitralada Palace in Bangkok, Thailand.

Considered to be the most exclusive school in Thailand, the school was initially established for the children of the Thai royal family and palace staff. Its first headmistress was Than Phu Ying Tasniya Punyagupta.

== Notable alumni ==
- Maha Vajiralongkorn – King of Thailand
- Dipangkorn Rasmijoti – Heir Presumptive of Thailand
- Sirindhorn – Princess Royal of Thailand
- Siribha Chudabhorn – Princess of Thailand
- Sirivannavari Nariratana - Princess of Thailand
- Chitpas Kridakorn – Politician and activist
- Piyapas Bhirombhakdi – Actress
- Narisa Chakrabongse – Writer, publisher, and environmental activist
