= Tasniya Punyagupta =

Thai educator and headmistress (1922–2023)

Thanphuying Tasniya Punyagupta
- ทัศนีย์ บุณยคุปต์
- Born: 9 September 1922
- Died: 28 June 2023 (aged 100); Vichaiyut Hospital, Bangkok, Thailand
- Spouse: Somporn Punyagupta
- Children: 1

Thanphuying Tasniya Punyagupta (Thai: ทัศนีย์ บุณยคุปต์; RTGS: Thatsani Bunyakhup; 9 September 1922 – 28 June 2023) was a Thai educator and the first headmistress of Chitralada School in Bangkok, Thailand.

Punyagupta began working at Chitralada School in 1955, teaching Princess Ubolratana. She later taught Maha Vajiralongkorn, the current King of Thailand.

Her Cremation Ceremony at Wat Bechamabophit on 18 November 2023 was presided over by King Vajiralongkorn and Queen Suthida, along with Princess Sirindhorn.
