= Piyapas Bhirombhakdi =

Thai actress

Mom Luang Piyapas Bhirombhakdi
- ปิยาภัสร์ ภิรมย์ภักดี
- Born: Piyapas Kridakon (ปิยาภัสร์ กฤดากร); May 8, 1962 (age 64); Bangkok, Thailand
- Occupation: Film actress
- Years active: 2001–present
- Spouse: Chutinant Bhirombhakdi (died 2022)
- Children: Chitpas Kridakorn; Nanthaya Bhirombhakdi; Naiyanop Bhirombhakdi

Mom Luang Piyapas Bhirombhakdi (Thai: หม่อมหลวงปิยาภัสร์ ภิรมย์ภักดี RTGS: Piyaphat Phiromphakdi, née Kridakorn กฤดากร RTGS: Kridakon; born 8 May 1962) is a Thai actress, primarily known for playing Queen Suriyothai in the 2001 movie The Legend of Suriyothai.

Piyapas is a great-granddaughter of Prince Nares Varariddhi, who was a son of King Mongkut. This distant royal descent is reflected by her title Mom Luang. Her father, M. R. Yongsawat Kridakorn, was a deputy director of the Crown Property Bureau. Her mother, Wiyada Kridakorn Na Ayudhya, was a lady-in-waiting to Queen Sirikit. Her nickname is "Khun Ton" (คุณต้น).

Piyapas went to Chulalongkorn University demonstration school and Chitralada School (the school attended by children of the Thai royal family). She completed a bachelor's degree in history from the Faculty of Education, Chulalongkorn University. She married Chutinant Bhirombhakdi, one of the heirs to the Boon Rawd Brewery fortune and executive vice-president of the Singha Corporation. They have two daughters and a son. Their eldest daughter, Chitpas Kridakorn, was a politician of the Democrat Party, and was a member of the Thai House of Representatives.

== Filmography ==
- The Legend of Suriyothai (2001)
