= Johnny Anfone =

Thai actor and singer (born 1969)

Johny Anfone
- จอนนี่ แอนโฟเน
- Born: Johny Anfone; October 28, 1969 (age 56); Thailand
- Occupations: Actor; television host; singer; politician
- Height: 1.80 m (5 ft 11 in)
- Spouse: Jariya Anfone
- Children: 3

Johny Anfone (Thai: จอนนี่ แอนโฟเน; born October 28, 1969) is a Thai actor, host, singer and politician. He is a former member of a Thai string combo band, GRAND EX. His best known international work is portraying Lord Worawongsa in the 2001 Thai epic film The Legend of Suriyothai.

== Early life ==
Anfone was born in Thailand to a Filipino musician, Rene Anfone, and a Thai German mother, Laongtip Puboon. He graduated from Assumption University.

== Career ==
=== Entertainment career ===
At the age of 15, Anfone was discovered by Nakorn Vejsupaporn (a guitarist and the leader of the band "GRAND EX"), while he was studying in Saint Dominic School, Bangkok. Vejsupaporn learned of Anfone's talents and offered him a spot in his band. Anfone served as a keyboardist and a backing vocalist of the band for three years, assisting with the release of one of the albums, Khuatlo.

He then joined Kantana, a popular film and television company in Thailand, to act in his first drama, Miti Muet. Since then, he's made appearances in more than 60 other dramas and movies.

=== Political career ===
During 2013–14, he took part in protests against the Yingluck Shinawatra government with the People's Democratic Reform Committee (PDRC), or Whistleblower.

In 2022, before the governor's election Bangkok that will happen soon. He became a member of the Thai Sang Thai Party, a newly political party formed by Sudarat Keyuraphan along with an apology for joining the protests in the past.

== Personal life ==
He married Jariya Anfone. The couple have a son and two daughters: Jirayu (James), Jompak (Jamie), and Jarichaya (Jeans).

== Works ==
=== Host ===
- Loi Lueng Kreng Padub
- Game Lakon Pisana
- Bubpayalawad
- Buddy Game
- 168 Hours
- Natee Chukchen
- The Eyes

=== Music video ===
- Oye oye (1988)
