= Santi Bhirombhakdi =

Thai business executive

Santi Bhirombhakdi (Thai: สันติ ภิรมย์ภักดี, born 29 June 1946) is a Thai business executive. He is the third-generation head of the Bhirombhakdi family, and serves as president and CEO of Boon Rawd Brewery, one of Thailand's largest beer corporations. He, together with his extended family, is ranked by Forbes as the twenty-third richest person/family in Thailand.

Santi is the younger son of Prachuab Bhirombhakdi, the eldest biological son of the family patriarch Phraya Bhirombhakdi. He took over as head of the company after his brother Piya vacated the post in the 1990s. He is married to Arunee Bhirombhakdi, with three children: Bhurit, Piti and Preerati.
