= Somporn Punyagupta =

Thai politician (1922–1989)

- สมพร บุณยคุปต์

Minister to the Prime Minister's Office
- In office November 12, 1977 – May 12, 1979
- Prime Minister: Kriangsak Chamanan

Minister of Transport
- In office May 24, 1979 – March 3, 1980
- Prime Minister: Kriangsak Chamanan

Personal details
- Born: May 15, 1922 Mueang Saraburi District, Saraburi Province, Thailand
- Died: April 30, 1989 (aged 66)
- Spouse: Than Phu Ying Tasniya Punyagupta

Somporn Punyagupta (Thai: สมพร บุณยคุปต์, RTGS: Somphon Bunyakhup; May 15, 1922 – April 30, 1989) was a Thai politician, serving as Minister of Transport from 1979 to 1980. He previously served as Minister to the Prime Minister's Office from 1977 to 1979.
