= Bank Robbers (1990 film) =

- Thai: ต้องปล้น
- Directed by: Chuchai Ongartchai
- Written by: Chaninthorn Prasertprasat
- Produced by: Charoen Iamphungphorn; Yuwadee Thaihiran
- Starring: Amphol Lumpoon; Pongpat Wachirabunjong; Worachet Nimsuwan; Junjira Joojaeng
- Cinematography: Anupap Buachand
- Music by: Butterfly
- Production company: Five Star Production
- Distributed by: Five Star Production
- Release date: October 11, 1990
- Running time: 149 minutes
- Country: Thailand
- Language: Thai

Bank Robbers or known in Thai as Tong Plon (Thai: ต้องปล้น, lit "have to rob") is a 1990 Thai crime-action film performing Amphol Lumpoon, Pongpat Wachirabunjong, Worachet Nimsuwan, Junjira Joojaeng.

== Plot ==
Three young men plan a bank robbery for a better life. Even if the robbery is successful, but all three were hunted down by the police. They ran away and hid in a luxury condominium. Many hostages had to be housed together. Each person has a different life. In the end, all three of them met their fate. The whole story began and ended in one day.

== Cast ==
- Amphol Lumpoon as Kong
- Pongpat Wachirabunjong as Boem
- Worachet Nimsuwan as Jon
- Junjira Joojaeng as nightclub singer
- Sakrat Ruekthamrong as police captain
- Supakorn Srisawat as police
- Kiat Kitjaroen as shopping mall manager
- Nappon Gomarachun as tycoon Thongchai
- Amara Asavananda as madam Somchin
- Ruj Ronapop as police commander
- Sulaleewan Suwanatat as granny
- Natanee Sitthisaman as geriatric nurse

== Production ==
The film is inspired by a true event in which a thief robbed a gold store and then fled to hide in an apartment with a woman as a hostage. It was filmed in many locations in Bangkok, such as Krung Thai Bank, Fueang Nakhon Road Branch, Kanlayana Maitri Road, Silom Road, and the old Customs House.

== Accolades ==
- 1990 Bangkok Critics Assembly Awards: Best Actor – Pongpat Wachirabunjong
- 1992 Suphannahong National Film Awards: Best Cinematography – Anupap Buachand
- 1992 Suphannahong National Film Awards: Best Supporting Actress – Junjira Joojaeng
