= Suparatana Bencharongkul =

Thai agriculturist and influencer

- Born: Thailand
- Occupation: COO of The Rakbankerd Group
- Known for: Agricultural technology

Suparatana Bencharongkul (Thai: ศุภรัตน์ เบญจรงคกุล) is a Thai agriculturist, lifestyle influencer, and the daughter of Boonchai Bencharongkul, a telecommunication tycoon. As an agriculturist, she combined farming and technology to start the Farmer Info Application, Sabuymarket, Allbio, Farmmanyam, Rakbankerd Products and Fulfield initiatives for the benefit of the farmers in Thailand.

She received a Bachelor of Business Administration from the University of Kent in 2003 and an Executive Master of Business Administration from the Sasin School of Management of Chulalongkorn University in 2015.

== Career ==
Suparatana is the chief operating officer of Rakbankerd Group, which is part of the family-owned Benchachinda Group. Her efforts are centered towards improving agricultural production in Thailand through the use of smart technologies such as artificial intelligence, unmanned aviation systems, and sensors, leading to higher yields per acre.

Suparatana pioneered the use of smart technology in agriculture, particularly rice production, which is one of Thailand's main crops. The technology aims to get more production for farmers in Thailand.

== See also ==
- Agricultural technology
- Thailand rice production
