= Crime Kings =

- Directed by: Tanit Jinukul
- Produced by: Nonzeen Nimibutr
- Starring: Amphol Lumpoon; Dom Hetrakul; Supakorn Kitsuwon; Sananthinee Phanchujit; Suphawat Amprasi
- Edited by: Mahasak Tassanapayak
- Music by: Jumras Sevataporn
- Production company: Five Star Production
- Distributed by: Five Star Production
- Release date: 20 May 1998
- Country: Thailand
- Language: Thai

Crime Kings (Thai: เสือ โจรพันธุ์เสือ) is a 1998 Thai action film directed by Tanit Jitnukul, produced by Nonzee Nimibutr, and starring Amphol Lumpoon, Dom Hetrakul, Supakorn Kitsuwon, Sananthinee Phanchujit, and Suphawat Amprasit. The film is based on the real life story of Suea Bai, a bandit who stole from the rich, and was prominent in 1940's Central Thailand, and is considered to be the Thai equivalent of Robin Hood. It is one of the several films that is based on the story of Suea Bai.

== Plot ==
In 1946, after World War II, Siam was in turmoil. The land was engulfed in flames, and chaos spread across the country. Poverty and hardship were rampant, with criminals and bandits looting everywhere, especially in the central region. However, a notorious outlaw from Lopburi, known as Suea Bai (Amphon Lamphun), was different—he stole from corrupt wealthy individuals to help the poor.

To stop him, the police department assigned Captain Yodying Suwannakhiri (Dom Hetrakul), a skilled officer, to capture Suea Bai. Suea Bai had a loyal right-hand man, Suea Yod, a dual-pistol gunslinger (Suphakorn Kistuwon).

When the two finally crossed paths, Captain Yodying uncovered Suea Bai's true identity—he was not just an ordinary bandit but actually Rewat Wichuprapha, the son of Phra Ya Borirak Pracharat (Lt. Col. Krisada Arunwong na Ayutthaya), a former high-ranking official who was falsely accused after the political transition. As a result, he was forced out of government service and hunted down, leaving his only son with no choice but to flee into the jungle and become an outlaw.

Despite Captain Yodying's efforts to persuade him to change his ways, Suea Bai refused. In the end, the two were left with no choice but to settle their fates in a deadly gun duel.

== Cast ==
- Amphon Lamphun - Suea Bai / Rewat Wichuprapha
- Dom Hetrakul - Captain Yodying Suwannakhon
- Supakorn Kitsuwon - Suea Yot, the Twin-Gun Tiger
- Sananthinee Phanchujit - Philaiwan
- Suphawat Amprasit - Suea Phao
- Peter Maiocchi - Lieutenant Manoch
- Yodrak Salakjai - Dr. Kiatt
- Suthep Hope - Sun
- Khajonsak Rattananissai - Nivat
- Sirilak Thakingsuk - Burong
- Captain Kritsada Arunwong na Ayutthaya - Phraya Borirak Pracharat
- Cris Horwang - Nu Tiw
- Khaosai Galaxy - Suea Muay
- Witit Lat - Suea Jerd
- Korakot Thanapat - Suea Ched
- Jenphop Chobkrabuanwan - Nai Prathuang
- Nonthree Nimibutr - Suea Oui
- Khajonsak Rattananissai - Nivat
- Kraisri Kaewwimon - Director-General of the Police Department
- Thanin Sanguanwong - Lieutenant Prasit
- Wiput Kulwong - Lieutenant Sathaan
- Somdej Santipracha - Nai Sanit
- Udom Udomroj - Nai Chamnarn
- Sakchai Sriboonnak - Suea Phiw
- Rittichai Rodsattru - Suea Choi
- Decha Senawat - Suea Kob
- Khemachart Yennum - Suea Pad
- Thiranit Thamrongwinitchai - Nai Kosin
- Ratch Boonchum - Captain Atth
- Jakkrit Maneenil - Lieutenant Somyot
- Kanchana Saengsi - Bua
- Jenjira Chansuda - Krathin
- Phannee To-na-yee - Ratree
- Manatchanok Maneethong - Buaphan
- Chaiya Sudjaidee - Suea Dee
- Suwajanee Chaimusik - The woman sitting on the bus
- Dr. Apiwat Wattanangkur - Minister's Secretary
- Michael Welch - Suea Noi
- Suchin Khwansanguan - The policeman welcoming Captain Yodying

== Behind the Scenes ==
Crime Kings is adapted from the novel Suea Bai by P. Intharapalit, a famous writer of the past. Initially, the creators intended to name it 72 Hours: Capture Suea Bai Dead or Alive, but it was changed for appropriateness. This film marks the return of Amphol Lumpoon to acting after a decade-long hiatus and also serves as the debut acting role for Dom Hetrakul, a young model and son of the owner of Daily News newspaper.

== Production ==
Filming took place in Bangkok, Chiang Mai Municipality, and the southern region, with the scene set to take place during the year 1946.

== Awards ==
The acting roles of both Ampol Lamphun and Dom Hetrakul won the Golden Doll Award for Best Actor and Best Supporting Actor of 1998 to dominate. In addition, the film has won many awards together.

- The 20th Phra Suraswadee Award of 1998
  - Best Male Leader (Amphol Lamphun)
  - Best Supporting Actor (Dom Hatrakul)
  - Best Art Director (Thikayu Thammanityakul, Satit Praditsarn, Kwanlada Saelim, Somporn Sirithavalit)
  - Excellent costume design (Kamolwan Viriyaphakdi, proposed by Laowithi, Ratchadawan Onpao)
  - Excellent makeup and hair styling (Nattawut Petchthong, Mongkolkarn Muangthip)
- The 7th Thai Film Awards of the Entertainment Critics Club
  - Best Supporting Actor (Supakorn Kitsuwan)
- The 8th Suphan Hong National Film Award
  - Best Supporting Actress (Sirilak Thekingsuk)
  - Best Photography (Wichian Ruangwichyakul)
  - Best Art Director (Thimayu Thammanityakul, Satit Praditsarn, Kwanladda Saenim and Somporn Sirichavalit)
  - Best Costumes (Kamolwan Viriyaphakdi, Laowithi and Ratchadawan Onpao)
