= National Lampoon =

National Lampoon may refer to:

- National Lampoon, Inc., an American mass media company
  - National Lampoon (magazine), an American humor magazine
  - The National Lampoon Radio Hour, an American comedy radio program
  - National Lampoon Comics, an American comic book
  - The National Lampoon Show, a 1975 play by John Belushi, Brian Doyle-Murray, Bill Murray, Gilda Radner, and Harold Ramis
  - List of National Lampoon films

== See also ==
- The Harvard Lampoon, an American humor magazine
- Lampoon (disambiguation)
