= Sasin School of Management =

Business school inThailand

Sasin Graduate Institute of Business Administration of Chulalongkorn University
- สถาบันบัณฑิตบริหารธุรกิจศศินทร์แห่งจุฬาลงกรณ์มหาวิทยาลัย
- Established: 1982
- Dean: Ian Fenwick
- Location: Sasa Patasala Building Soi Chula 12, Phyathai Road, Bangkok, Thailand; 13.7426°N 100.5272°E
- Website: www.sasin.edu

The Sasin Graduate Institute of Business Administration of Chulalongkorn University (Sasin School of Management or Sasin; Thai: สถาบันบัณฑิตบริหารธุรกิจศศินทร์แห่งจุฬาลงกรณ์มหาวิทยาลัย หรือ ศศินทร์), is a graduate business school located in Bangkok, Thailand and is affiliated with Chulalongkorn University. Sasin is AACSB accredited and was the first business school in Thailand to achieve this recognition in 2010. The school is also EQUIS accredited and also achieved this status in 2010. Sasin was founded in 1982 through a collaboration among Chulalongkorn University, the Kellogg School of Management and the Wharton Business School. It was previously known as the Sasin Graduate Institute of Business Administration of Chulalongkorn University.

== Meaning of name ==
His Majesty King Bhumibol Adulyadej bestowed the name on the Graduate Institute of Business Administration on his 60th birthday, 5 December 1987. The name comes from two Sanskrit words: "sasa" and "indra". Sasa, meaning "rabbit" represents the king's birth year in the Thai 12-year astrological cycle. Indra means "chief." Thus "Sasin" literally means "king of the rabbits."

== Programs ==
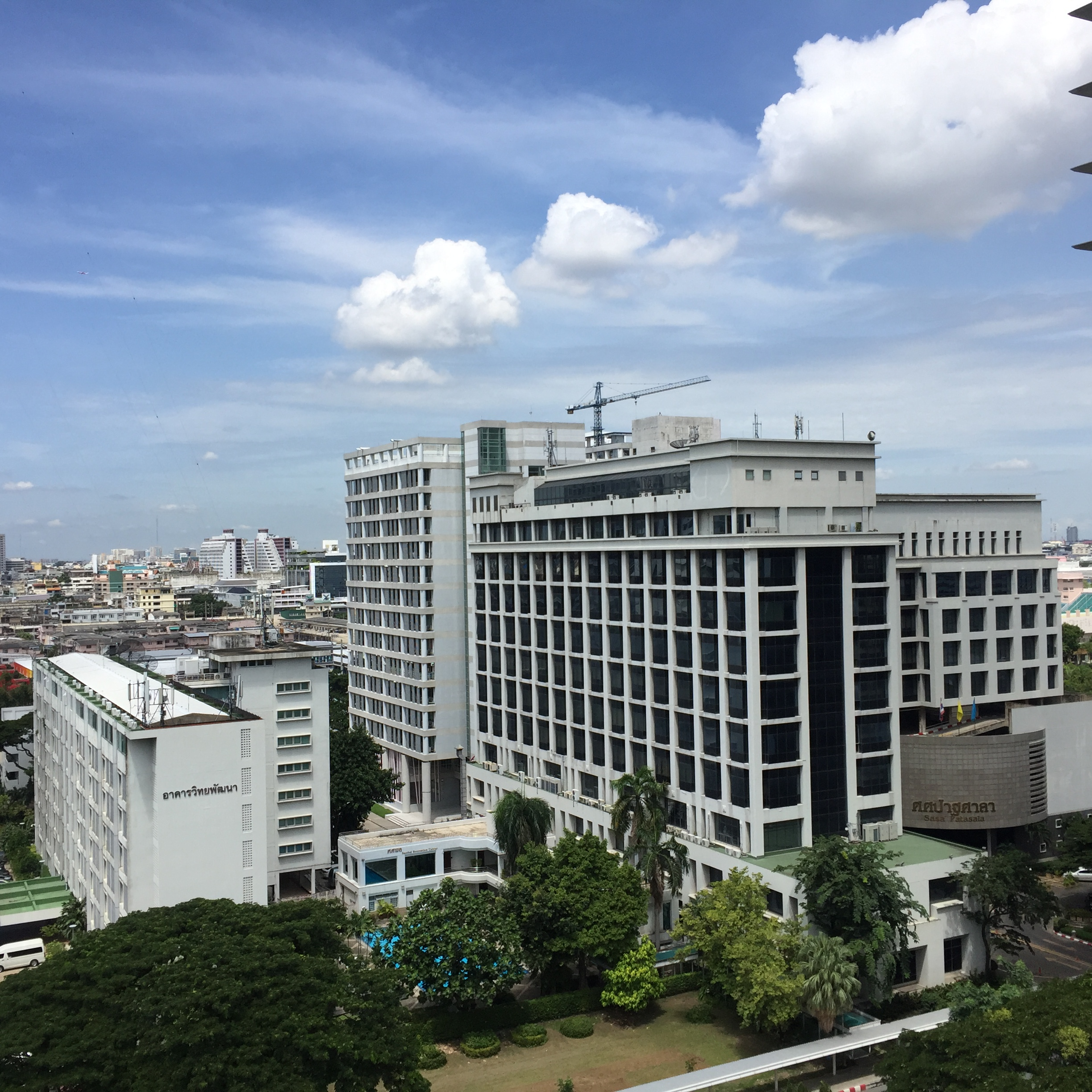
Sasa Patasala, Sasin's main building

Sasin pioneered the use of visiting professors complemented by full-time Sasin faculty and other experts in Southeast Asia.

Sasin programs, conducted in English, include:

- The Flexible (MBA)
- Dual MBA & Master of Engineering
- Executive MBA
- Doctor of Business Administration (DBA)
- Executive Education: Senior Executive Program (SEP), Management programs (public), Corporate programs (in-company)

== Sasin faculty ==
The current Director (Dean) of Sasin is Professor Ian Fenwick, Ph.D.

The founder of Sasin is Professor Toemsakdi Krishnamra, who served as director (dean) from 1982 to 2014. He also served as President of Association of Asia-Pacific Business Schools in 2009.

Sasin's full-time faculty members hold doctoral degrees from internationally recognized universities such as Carnegie Mellon University, University of Cambridge, Imperial College, Kellogg School of Management (Northwestern), London School of Business (currently, London Business School), University of Oxford, University of Southern California, and University of Michigan.

== Prominent alumni ==
Sasin has produced a number of business leaders, including:

- Arthid Nanthawithaya, chief executive officer, Siam Commercial Bank Public Co., Ltd.
- Suparatana Bencharongkul, Chief Operating Officer, Rakbenkerd Group.
- Artirat Charukitpipat, chief executive officer at Bumrungrad International Hospital
- Aung Kyaw Moe, Founder and Group CEO of 2C2P (payment gateway)
- Banyong Pongpanich, chairman at Phatra Securities Plc & Director, chairman of the executive committee, Member of the Risk Management Committee at Kiatnakin Bank Public Company Limited
- Bhurit Bhirombhakdi, chief executive officer, Boonrawd Trading Co., Ltd.
- Charn Srivikorn, chairman and director of Gaysorn Property and Gaysorn Asset Land Management
- Dr. Prasarn Bhiraj Buri, chief executive officer of BHIRAJ BURI GROUP
- Kaveepan Eiamsakulrat, executive chairman, K.E. Group Co., Ltd.
- Kittiratt Na-Ranong, former deputy director of Sasin, former Minister of Commerce, former Deputy Prime Minister of Thailand
- M.L. Dispanadda Diskul, chief executive officer of Mae Fah Luang Foundation
- Pawoot Pongvitayapanu, chief executive officer & founder TARAD.com
- Somhatai Panichewa, chief executive officer & director Amata VN PCL
- Somjate Moosirilert, chief executive officer, Thanachart Capital Public Company Limited
- Sudarat Keyuraphan, Chairperson of The Lumbini Development Project and Chairwoman of Pheu Thai Party's strategic committee
- Thitinan Wattanavekin, Head of Wealth Management, Kiatnakin Bank Public Co., Ltd.
- Vichai Bencharongkul, president, Benchachinda Holding Co., Ltd.

== Sasin Japan Center (SJC) ==
Sasin Japan Center (SJC) offers business management consulting for Japanese companies in Thailand. It also offers management training, management seminars, and market research.

SJC has three domains:

- research, working with Japanese top universities,
- education, providing Japanese executives with comprehensive management education program in collaboration with Sasin Executive Education Center and Japan Management Association (JMA),
- consulting, solving business challenges with Sasin Management Consulting and Japan Management Association Consulting (JMAC).
