= Micro (Thai band) =

Thai rock band

- Origin: Bangkok, Thailand
- Genres: Rock; pop rock; new wave; Hard rock; Progressive rock
- Years active: 1983–1998, 2003–present
- Label: GMM Grammy
- Members: Amphol Lumpoon; Kraiphop Jandee; Mana Prasertwong; Santhan Lauhawatanawit; Adinant Nokteat; Adisai Nokteat

Micro (Thai: ไมโคร) were a Thai rock band formed in 1983 in Bangkok, Thailand. They released their first album in 1986 and were known for their energetic performances and pop melodies. The band later signed to the GMM Grammy label.

The group has released a six studio albums. The lead vocals for their first three albums was Amphol Lumpoon. And when Amphol Lumpoon left the band for solo career, Kraiphop Jandee became the band's lead vocals for the latter three albums. The band reunited in 2010s for concerts.

== Current members ==
- Amphol Lumpoon (Nui): lead vocals
- Kraiphop Jandee (Kop): guitar, vocals
- Mana Prasertwong (Ouan): guitar
- Santhan Lauhawatanawit (Boy): keyboard
- Adinant Nokteat (Aod): bass
- Adisai Nokteat (Poo): drum

== Discography ==
=== Studio album ===
- ร็อค เล็ก เล็ก (Rock Lek Lek) (1986)
- หมื่นฟาเรนไฮด์ (Meun Fahrenheit) (1988)
- เต็มถัง (Tem Tang) (1989)
- เอี่ยมอ่องอรทัย (Eimong Oratai) (1991)
- สุริยคราส (Suriya Krast) (1995)
- ทางไกล (Tarng Krai) (1997)
