= Phuket Beer =

Thai beer brand

- Industry: Alcoholic beverage
- Founded: 2002
- Headquarters: Bangkok, Thailand
- Key people: Somsak Ornsri (CEO)
- Products: Beer
- Production output: Thailand, Cambodia
- Owner: Phuket Beer Thailand Company Limited
- Website: www.phuketbeer.com

Phuket Lager Beer is an Asian beer brand founded in 2002 in Thailand. The beer is brewed with premium German hops and Thai jasmine rice.

== History ==
Phuket Beer was launched in 2002 as a premium beer, associating itself with the lifestyle of Phuket, a Thai beach resort. Phuket Beer is brewed at the San Miguel Brewery, Thailand, and Phnom Penh Brewery, Cambodia, under the supervision of Tropical Beverage Corporation Company Limited (TROPBEVCO).

== Products ==
Phuket Beer has no additives or preservatives and is produced in small batches every two to three months. It is 5% alcohol-by-volume (AVB) and has 21 international bitterness units (IBU). Phuket Beer is available in 640 ml, 330 ml bottle and 330 ml can.

Phuket Beer's logo features a hornbill bird, the company's mascot, with a neck foil design of Laem Promthep (Promthep Cape), a well-known landmark on Phuket island.

== Distribution ==
Phuket Lager is sold in Thailand and distributed overseas by Import & Export LR, (FRANCE).

== Awards ==
Phuket Lager received the first gold medal ever for a beer from Thailand at the 2006 Monde Selection Awards. Following this, it was awarded gold medals in 2007-2010 from the organization, earning the high quality award for its five consecutive medals.
