= The Legend of Suriyothai =

2001 film by Chatrichalerm Yukol

- DVD box for the US release of Suriyothai.
- Directed by: Chatrichalerm Yukol
- Screenplay by: Chatrichalerm Yukol
- Story by: Sunait Chutintaranond
- Based on: The life of Queen Suriyothai
- Produced by: Kamla Yukol; Kim Aubry
- Starring: Piyapas Bhirombhakdi; Sarunyoo Wongkrachang; Chatchai Plengpanich; Johnny Anfone; Mai Charoenpura; Sorapong Chatree; Amphol Lampoon
- Cinematography: Anupap Buachand; Stanislav Dorsic; Igor Luther
- Edited by: Chatrichalerm Yukol; Patamanadda Yukol; Francis Ford Coppola (U.S. cut)
- Music by: Richard Harvey; Michael Pärt (music editing)
- Distributed by: Sahamongkol Film International (Thailand); Sony Pictures Classics / American Zoetrope (U.S.)
- Release date: August 17, 2001 (Thailand)
- Running time: 185 minutes (Thailand); 142 minutes (U.S.)
- Language: Thai
- Budget: $11 million
- Box office: $14 million

The Legend of Suriyothai (Note: At the outset, Chatrichalerm Yukol intended to give the film the English title The Sun and The Moon, with "the Sun" referring to Suriyothai and "the Moon" to Sri Sudachan, two female figures portrayed as opposites.) (Thai: สุริโยไท) is a 2001 Thai historical drama film written and directed by Chatrichalerm Yukol. It depicts the story of Queen Suriyothai, who was killed in the Burmese–Siamese War of 1548 when she sacrificed herself in battle to save King Maha Chakkraphat and the kingdom.

The film was the most expensive ever made in Thailand at the time of its release, and became the country's highest-grossing film, a record it held until it was surpassed by Pee Mak.

== Plot ==
The story follows the course of the life of Suriyothai from her adolescence to her death. As Suriyothai is only known from three lines in a chronicle, most of the film relies on an invented story rather than claiming to be actual history. It presents a young woman, Suriyothai, of minor royal standing who has strong opinions and self-determination. The movie reveals the princess' boldness through scenes where she breaks tradition by walking among the commoners to meet her lover Pirenthorathep, who in turn pledges that he will come to her aid whenever she wants.

Her father insists that she must marry Prince Thienraja, the son of the second king of the realm. In an attempt to escape a marriage she does not want, she runs away and is captured by the principal king who explains the possible problems her marriage to Piren might cause to Siam. For the good of the kingdom, she marries Prince Thienraja to keep peace in the royal families. From this point on she remains loyal to the man she likes but does not love and remains strongly independent.

The principal king dies, and Thien's father inherits the throne. A few years later, smallpox makes its first appearance in Siam and the king is stricken with the disease. On his deathbed he extracts a promise of support for his young son, later known as Ratsadathirat, from Chairachathirat, his nephew, and Thien. Burma invades in the north and Chairachathirat assumes the throne to protect Siam. He executes the child king, which Thien protests but on Suriyothai's advice accepts Chairachathirat as his ruler.

Chairachathirat's wife, Queen Jitravadee, dies shortly after giving birth to the heir Yotfa. The king takes a new consort, Sri Sudachan, and has a son from her. After several years of peace, Chairachathirat leaves the capital, Ayutthaya, for a military campaign in the north. Soon after, Sri Sudachan, emerging from the deposed Uthong dynasty, takes Boonsri Worawongsa, another Uthong descendant, as a lover and starts plotting to take over the throne.

The king is wounded in battle and comes back to the capital to recuperate, where Srisudachan poisons him and attempts to blame the deed on Tien. Tien saves his own life by becoming a Buddhist monk. Srisudachan proceeds by naming Worawongsa as regent and promptly poisoning Yotfa, thereby assuming power. Suriyothai then summons her old friend Piren, who was Chairachathirat's troop commander, to help set things right. His troops ambush and kill Worawongsa and Sri Sudachan, and Tien accepts the throne despite his monkhood.

Upon hearing this, Burmese King Tabinshwehti invades again and lays siege to Ayutthaya. In a dramatic finale, however, the Burmese invade the new kingdom, and Queen Suriyothai heroically rides into battle with her husband and her unrequited childhood love at her side. The queen is slain, falling in slow motion from the elephant in full uniform with her throat cut. The ending scene reveals a traditional funeral for royals.

== Cast ==
- ML Piyapas Bhirombhakdi as Queen Suriyothai
- Sarunyoo Wongkrachang as King Maha Chakkraphat (Prince Thienraja)
- Chatchai Plengpanich as Lord Pirenthorathep
- Johnny Anfone as Lord Worawongsa
- Mai Charoenpura as Lady Sri Sudachan
- Sinjai Plengpanich as Lady Srichulalak
- Sorapong Chatree as Viscount Rajseneha
- Sombat Metanee as Lord Mingyi Thihathu
- Suphakit Tangthatswasd as King Tabinshwehti
- Saharat Sangkapreecha as Lord Bayinnaung
- Ronrittichai Khanket as Viceroy of Pyay
- Warut Woradhamm as Sihatu
- Pongpat Wachirabunjong as King Chairachathirat
- Phimonrat Phisarayabud as Young Suriyothai / Princess Sawadirat
- Amphol Lampoon as Lord Intarathep
- Penpak Sirikul as Queen Chiraprapha
- Chompoonut Sawaetwong as Princess Baromdilok
- Jeeranan Kitprasan as Princess Thep Kasattri
- Sa-Ard Piempongsan as Chancellor of Defense

The film stars another Thai royal, Piyapas Bhirombhakdi, as Queen Srisuriyothai. She is a royal descendant bearing the title M.L. (Mom Luang).

Thai pop star Mai Charoenpura is among the principal performers, portraying the scheming Lady Sri Sudachan. Other cast members include Sarunyu Wongkrachang as Prince Thienraja, Chatchai Plengpanich as Lord Piren, and Johnny Anfone as Lord Worawongsa.

Several veterans of Thai cinema also appear, including action star Sombat Metanee and Sorapong Chatree, the latter known for his many collaborations with Chatrichalerm in the 1970s and 1980s.

== Production ==
=== Background ===
The film was financed by Queen Sirikit, who appointed royal family members to the directorial position (Chatrichalerm) and to the role of the lead actress. Chatrichalerm wrote the screenplay and directed. Kamla, his wife, designed the costumes and served as a producer. Because of Queen Sirikit's backing, when the script called for a large number of men in the battle scenes, Royal Thai Army and Royal Thai Navy personnel were called upon to help make up the thousands of extras required.

Chatrichalerm states that The Legend of Suriyothai was originally the idea of Queen Sirikit. According to Chatrichalerm, the Queen wanted the Thai people to have a better understanding of their history and felt that a motion picture would be a good way to accomplish this. Chatrichalerm and Queen Sirikit mutually agreed to use Suriyothai as their first subject.

Documents sent to King John III of Portugal (1521–1557) from Domingos de Seixas, a mercenary in the Ayutthaya Kingdom from 1524 to 1549, were consulted. The film depicts some Portuguese, and their introduction of Early Modern warfare, but the only one with a speaking part was a physician called to the deathbed of the poisoned king. (Note: Originally, the production had planned to include a character of Domingos de Seixas himself, with English actor Jeremy Irons slated to portray him, though this was ultimately omitted from the final version.)

Amporn Jirattikorn argues that other motivations for the film included a fear of foreign influence after the 1997 Asian financial crisis and competition from another historical figure, the sister to King Naresuan. According to Jirattikorn, the film attempts to provide a national hero connected to the current monarchical dynasty, in contrast to other Thai films presenting events of the same era (e.g., Bang Rajan).

The film makes extensive use of historical locations across Thailand, and its large cast and high production values depict life in the 16th century in considerable detail. The battle sequences employed thousands of extras, along with hundreds of real elephants used as mobile battle platforms. Principal photography lasted three years.

Reports on the production budget vary widely, ranging from US$8 million to US$20 million, which would place it among the most expensive Thai films ever made. Due to the involvement of the Thai royal family, however, precise figures are difficult to verify. Their patronage also enabled filming in locations that would otherwise have been difficult—or impossible—for other directors to access.

=== Alternative versions ===
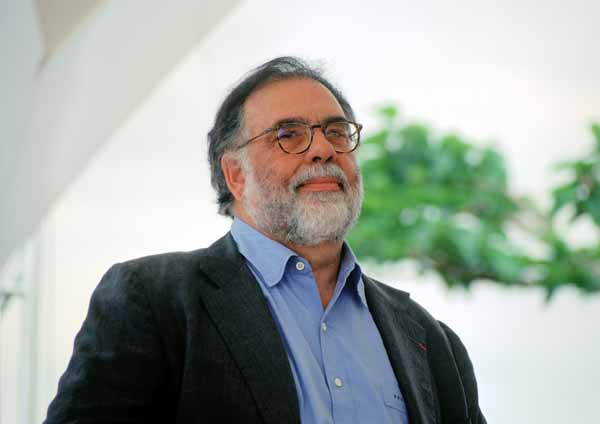
Francis Ford Coppola presented the international cut of The Legend of Suriyothai, released in the U.S. as Francis Ford Coppola Presents: The Legend of Suriyothai

When the film was released on August 12, 2001 in Thailand, it was simply titled Suriyothai and had a running time of 185 minutes. This is pared down quite a bit from its intended eight-hour length. A five-hour version exists in a DVD box-set released in Thailand.

In 2003, it was released in the United States, with a running time of 142 minutes. This version was edited by Francis Ford Coppola. The US release by Sony Pictures Classics in association with Coppola's company American Zoetrope was entitled Francis Ford Coppola Presents: The Legend of Suriyothai. Some critics argue that the original Thai release was the better presentation of the film, with others even preferring the five-hour DVD set, which does have English subtitles.

== Reception ==
=== Critical reception ===
In his review of The Legend of Suriyothai in technohistory.com, Steve Sanderson states "The film's celebration of female power is initially refreshing, suggesting some nascent feminist impulse."

When she marries Prince Tien to keep peace she remains loyal to the man she likes but does not love and remains independent. According to The New York Times' review, this sacrifice is act of placing patriotic duty and family loyalty over her own feelings.

On Rotten Tomatoes the film has an approval rating of 51% based on reviews from 61 critics. On Metacritic the film has a score of 58% based on reviews from 21 critics.

=== Box office ===
The film was the highest-grossing film of all-time in Thailand with a reported gross of $14 million, three-times as much as Titanic. It was number one at the Thai box office for five weeks. The film grossed $458,564 in the United States and Canada.

== Sequels ==
A follow-up film focusing on King Naresuan, the grandson of Queen Suriyothai, titled The Legend of King Naresuan, was released in 2007 as a continuation of the historical narrative introduced in The Legend of Suriyothai. The project expanded into a multi-part epic depicting the major events throughout Naresuan's life.

== See also ==
- List of historical drama films of Asia
