= Amphol Lumpoon =

Thai actor and singer

- อำพล ลำพูน
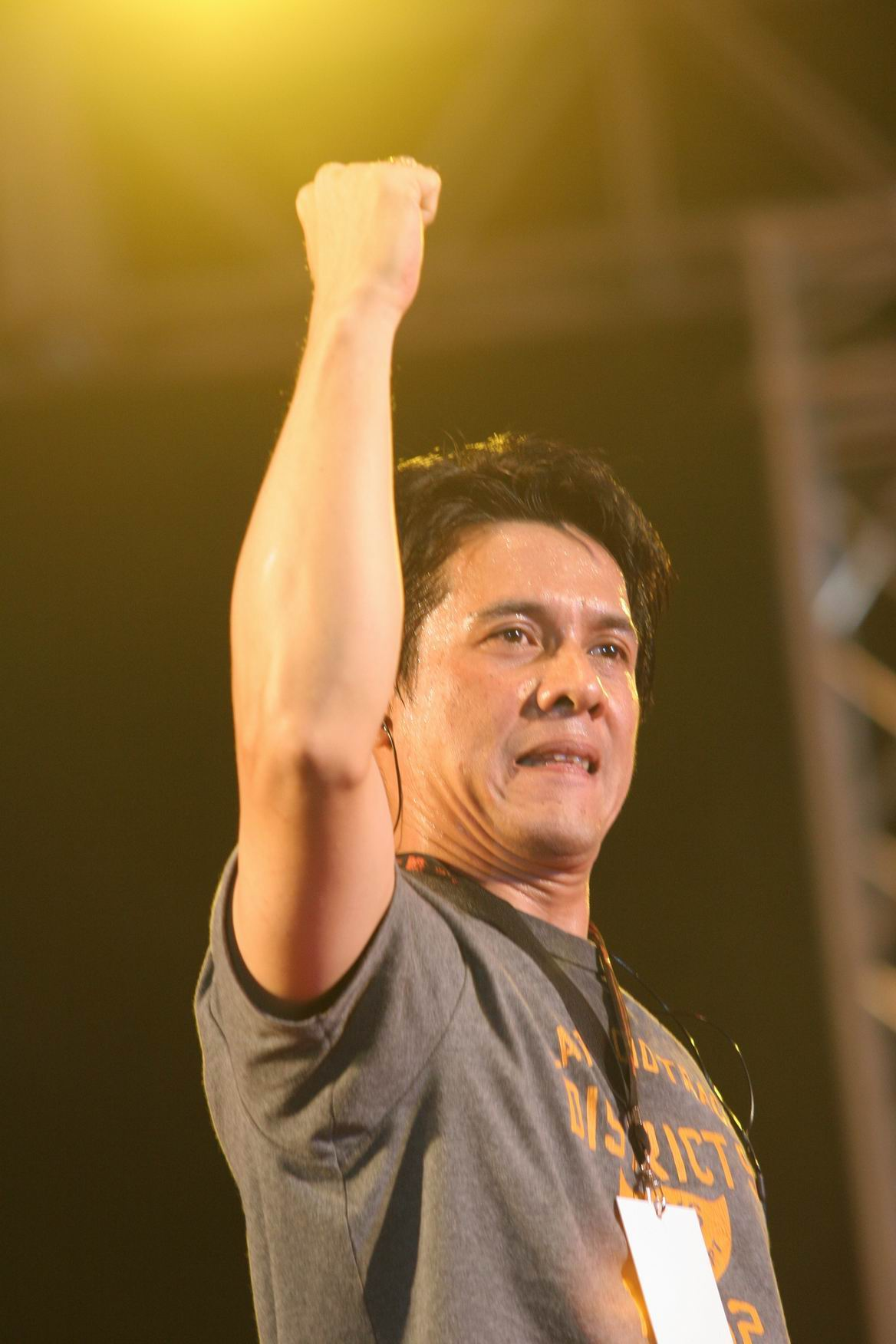
- Amphol performing at the 2007 Pattaya International Music Festival.
- Born: Amphol Lumkool; July 20, 1963 (age 63); Rayong, Thailand
- Occupations: Singer, actor
- Years active: 1980s–present
- Spouse: Marsha Vadhanapanich (div. 1997)
- Children: Nawapol Lumpoon (Guy)
- Awards: Asia Pacific Film Festival 1984; Best actor, Story of Nam Pu; Thailand National Film Association Awards 2000; Best actor, Ang Yee - Dragon's Son
- Website: Archived 17 December 2014 at the Wayback Machine

Amphol Lumpoon (Thai: อำพล ลำพูน, RTGS: Amphon Lamphun; born July 20, 1963) is a Thai actor and singer. He was the lead singer in the Thai rock band, Micro, before their split up, where he then began his solo career. During the 1980s, 1990s and early 2000s, he was an actor, even winning two awards.

== Music career ==
Amphol's songs (solo, and with Micro) include "Jai Sohm Sohm" ("Broken Heart"), "Ow Pai Loey" ("Take It"), "Bauk Mah Kum Diow" ("Tell Me One Thing") and "Sia Mai" ("Broken"). A compilation album featuring new Thai rock bands such as Clash, Zeal and Kala called Little Rock Project features songs by Amphol and Micro being covered by various artists.

=== Discography ===
-Micro-

- Rock Lek Lek (Little Bit of Rock, 1986)
- Meun Fha Rain Hi (10,000 Fahrenheit, 1988)
- Dtem Tung (Fill the Tank, 1989)

-Amphol-

- Danger (Wutoo Wai Fai, 1992)
- Iron Horse (Mahlhek, 1993)
- I.D. Card (Phol Meung Dee, 1995)

-Micro (2000s)-

- Micro: Rock In Love/Rock In Rock (The Best Selected (GMM Grammy Compilation), 2002)
- Micro: The Final Collection 1/2 (Micro's band and Amphol's solo songs, 2003)
- Tum Narn Meu Kwa: Micro: Put the right hand in the right concert (CD Audio/VCD/DVD Concert, 2004)
- Micro: Songs by Nitipong Hornak (2007)
- Micro: The Long Play Collection (2008-2009)
  - Rock Lek Lek
  - 10,000 Fahrenheit
  - Wutoo Wai Fai
- Micro: The 25 Years Hit Collection (2010)
- Sek Loso: PLUS (Features Big Ass (band), Bodyslam (band), and Sek Loso. With live performances from the 25 Years Rock Lek Lek RETURNs concert in karaoke.)

=== Concertography ===
- Rock Lek Lek Concert, 1987
- Amphol and Micro Concert: Ow Micro Pai Loey(อำพล ลำพูน กับ วงไมโคร คอนเสิร์ตเอาไมโครไปเลย), 1988
- Micro: Full Tank (Tem Tung), 1989
- Meu Kwa Sa-muk-kee, 1990
- Amphol Concert: Kon Wai Fai, 1993
- Amphol Concert: Asawin Mahlhek, 1995
- Amphol Concert: Gub Kon Wai Jai; Taun Ow Ga Kow Noi, 1995
- Amphol: Big Story Concert 1986-1996, 1997
- Tum Narn Meu Kwa: Micro: Put the right hand in the right concert, 2003
- Micro/Nuvo: ONE BIG SHOW, 2004
- Amphol Meung Dee Gub Billy Khem (Concert with Billy Ogan), 2005
- H.M. Blues, 2006
- Rewut Putinun: Remember in Tribute Concert, 2007
- 25 Years Nitipong Hornak, 2007
- Rock for the King, 2007
- Micro: Rock Lek Lek RETURNs, 2010 (Special Guests, Billy Ogan, Sek Loso, Big Ass, Mai Charoenpura)

== Personal life ==
Amphol was married to singer-actress Marsha Wattanapanich. They divorced in 1997. They have one child together.

== Filmography ==
Year	Title	Role	Notes
1984	Wai Ra Rerng		
1984	The Story of Nampoo	Nampoo	Main Role
1985	Song Pee Nong	An	
1986	Scholar Maid	Puwares	
1986	Huajai Diew Gun		
1986	Raeng Heung	Vikit	Main Role
1987	Dee Tak		
1990	Bank Robbers	Kong	
1990	Phan Mah Bah	Tai	
1998	Seua jone phan seua (Crime Kings)	Seua Bigh	
1999	Cloning Khon Copy Khon	Niwat	
2000	Ang Yee - Dragon's Son		
2001	The Legend of Suriyothai		
2004	Bangkok Robbery		

== Awards ==
Amphol had the title role in The Story of Nam Pu, directed by Euthana Mukdasanit, which was submitted by Thailand for Academy Award for Best Foreign Language Film. Amphol won the best actor award at the Asia Pacific Film Festival for Nam Pu, an award he shared with Chow Yun-fat for Hong Kong 1941. Amphol was also awarded best actor for Ang Yee - Dragon's Son at the 2000 Thailand National Film Association Awards.
