= Boon Rawd Brewery =

Thai brewery

- Industry: Beverage
- Founded: 1933; 93 years ago
- Founder: Phraya Bhirom Bhakdi
- Headquarters: Bangkok, Thailand
- Area served: Worldwide
- Key people: Bhurit Bhirombhakdi, President & CEO
- Products: Alcoholic beverages; Aviation; Bottled water; Soft drinks
- Brands: Singha, Leo, U, Asahi
- Number of employees: 3,500
- Subsidiaries: Singha Corporation
- Website: boonrawd.co.th

Boon Rawd Brewery (Thai: บริษัท บุญรอดบริวเวอรี่ จำกัด) is a Thai brewery founded in 1933 by Phraya Bhirom Bhakdi (Boonrawd Sreshthaputra). It also produces soft drinks and bottled drinking water. Their best-known product is the pale lager Singha.

== History ==
Boon Rawd Brewery was the first to open in Thailand and produces its beer under the brand name of Singha. It was founded in the early 1930s by Boonrawd Sreshthaputra, who had received the title of Phraya Bhirom Bhakdi from King Prajadhipok. The brewery remains under the management of his descendants, who use Bhirom Bhakdi as their family name.

The Singha is an Asian lion, but in both Hindu and Thai traditional tales, it is a powerful mythological creature. It was chosen because it is an easily recognizable symbol. The Garuda on the bottle's neck shows Boonrawd Brewery's royal approval, which is granted only to companies with a long-standing favorable reputation. It received this on 25 October 1939, by a royal warrant signed by King Rama VII's Regent. Boon Rawd is the only brewery in Thailand to receive such a right.

In 1994, Boon Rawd Brewery bought a brewery in Hartmannsdorf and another in Mittweida, Saxony. Until 2001, these had produced Singha Gold for the European market under contract, although Singha beer itself has always been brewed in Thailand. Today, all Singha brands are only made in Thailand.

=== Founder ===
Phraya Bhirom Bhakdi was born as Boonrawd Sreshthaputra on 13 October 1872, son of Pra Bhirom Bhakdi (Chom Sresthaputra). He was taught by his father until age 11 when he was sent to a temple to be educated by Buddhist monks, as was customary for boys at the time. He taught primary school while still in his teens, then became a clerk at A.J.Dickson, a British-owned logging company. He next sold cars, before embarking on his first business. He opened a ferry service across the Chao Praya River, linking Bangkok and Thonburi. All went well until others copied his idea, which reduced his profits. The government eventually built bridges across the river, and he shut down his ferries for good. In 1929, he moved to open Thailand's first brewery. The following year, he requested governmental approval. When it was granted, Boonrawd toured Germany and Denmark to learn how beer was made. He constructed his brewery in 1933, and the first bottles rolled off the assembly line in 1934.

== Operations ==
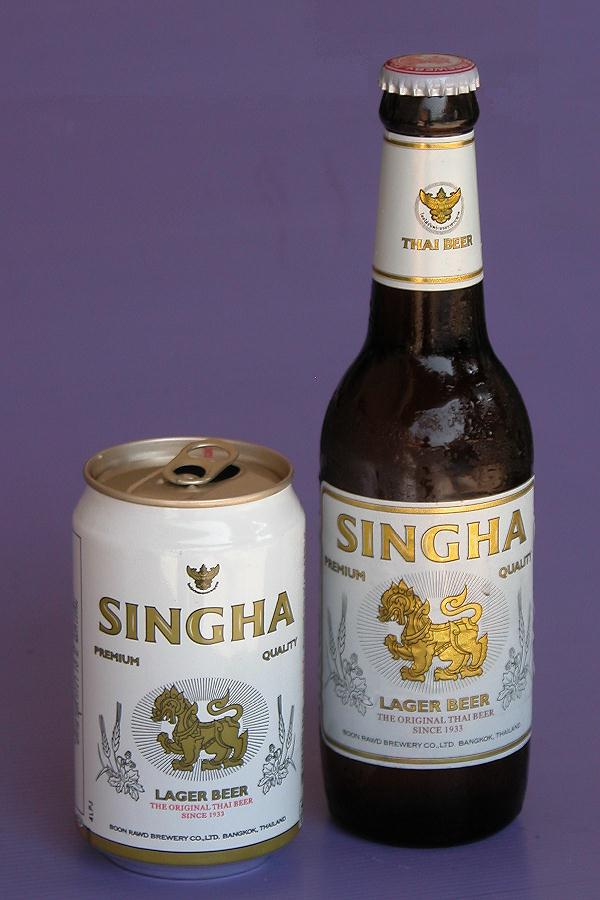
Singha beer, Boon Rawd's best known product

Boon Rawd has 3,500 employees in nine factories in Bangkok, Chiang Mai, Singburi, Khon Kaen, Ayutthaya, Pathum Thani, and Surat Thani.

Boon Rawd produces beers: Singha, Leo, U, Snow, Asahi, and other brands. It also produces soda and drinking water. It has a capacity of one billion liters per year. Ten percent of its production is exported.

== See also ==
- Bhirombhakdi family
- Thai Chinese
