= Musiccream =

Thai defunct record label

- Parent company: GMM Music
- Founded: January 1, 1998; 28 years ago
- Defunct: August 2022; 4 years ago
- Status: Defunct
- Genre: Pop
- Country of origin: Thailand

Musiccream (Thai: มิวสิคครีม, also stylized as Music Cream) is a Thai former record label and a subsidiary of GMM Grammy that focuses on pop music genre. Until the records label defunted on August 2022. And the Musiccream's YouTube channel was deleted on the same day

== Roster ==
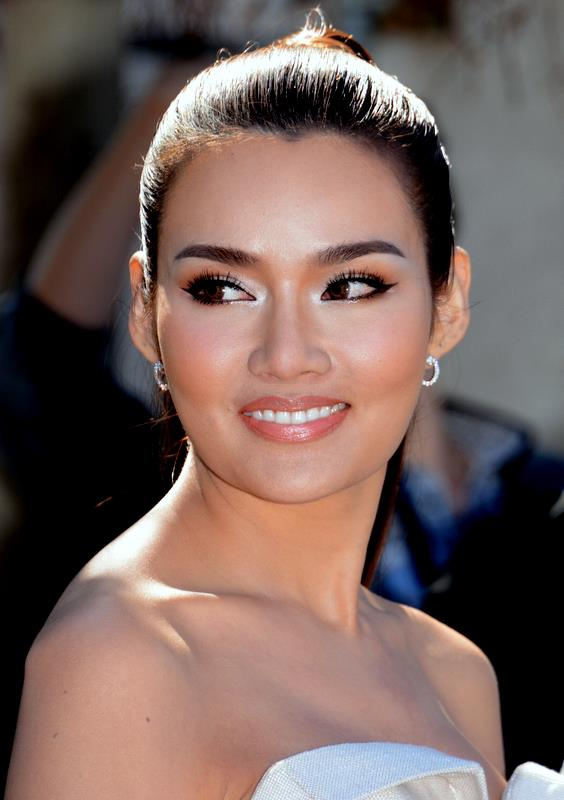
Rhatha Phongam

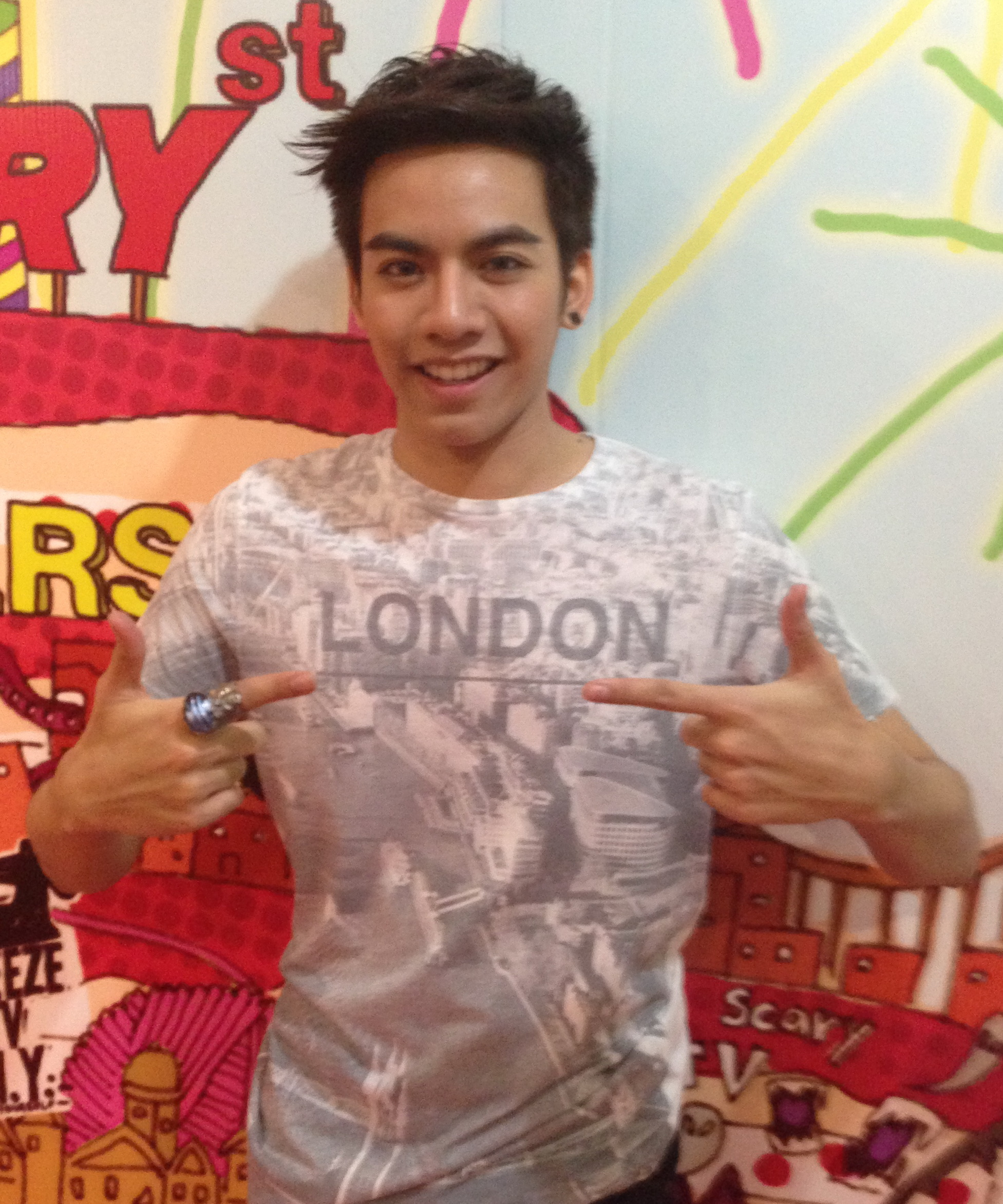
Thanasit Jaturaput

=== Current acts ===
- Napassorn Phuthornjai and Piyanut Sueajongpru – (New Jiew)
- Pongsak Rattanapong (Aof)
- Rhatha Phongam (Ying)
- Nontanun Anchuleepradit (Kacha)
- Patcha Anek-ayuwat
- Tatchapol Thitiapichai (Tanthai) and Phongnarong Jingjamikorn (Ponjang) – (Ampersand)
- Thanasit Jaturaput (Ton)

=== Former acts ===
- Buachompoo Ford (Bua)
- Nathapatsorn Simasthien (Dao)
- Natalie Stybert (Nana) for "Episode II อาคันตุก๊ะ" album
- Potato for "Go...On", "Life" and "Sense" albums
- Katreeya English for "Siamese Kat", "Lucky Girl" and "Sassy K" albums
- Kalorin Supaluck Neemayothin (Kal)
- Lanna Commins
- Palmy for "Beautiful Ride" album
- Ozone for "Ozone" album
- Smith Arayaskul (Oak)
- Sunita Leetikul (Beau)
- Auttapon Prakopkong (M)
- Muanpair Panaboot (Ging)
- Vorakarn Rojjanavatchra (Punch)
- Kanist Piyapaphakornkoon (Teng)
- Nat Sakdatorn
- Arunpong Chaiwinit (Dew)
