= Jan Dara =

Jan Dara may refer to:

- The Story of Jan Dara, a novel by Utsana Phloengtham; see Jan Dara the Beginning
- Jan Dara (2001 film), a Thai film adapted from the novel and directed by Nonzee Nimibutr
- Directed by Bhandevanov Devakula:
  - Jan Dara the Beginning, a 2012 film
  - Jan Dara: The Finale, a 2013 film
