= Sakrat Ruekthamrong =

Thai actor

- Born: Samran Chamras (สำราญ จำรัส); 25 February 1963 (age 62); Phrae province, Thailand
- Other names: Jeab
- Citizenship: Thai
- Education: Phiriyalai School Phrae; Air Technical Training School
- Occupations: Actor; model; airman; basketball player
- Years active: 1980s–present

Sakrat Ruekthamrong (Thai: ศักราช ฤกษ์ธำรงค์) is a Thai actor, and former model, airman, basketball player.

== Early life ==
Ruekthamrong was born on 25 February 1963 in Phrae province, north of Thailand. He was raised by his grandmother as his parents split up when he was a child. Used to be a non-commissioned air force officer who graduated from Air Technical Training School in Bangkok. His highest rank was Sergeant (Sgt), during which time he was also an Air Force basketball player, including still being in the same company as famed football player Piyapong Pue-on.

== Entertainment career ==
He has been in the entertainment industry since the '80s, starting from being a model and has been an actor without acting coach in many television series as well as movies.

Ruekthamrong often starred in movies and TV series directed by Bhandevanov Devakula on a regular basis.

== Partal filmography ==
Film

- Phi Liang (1988) as Chotiwan
- Sherry Ann (2001) as Vichai Chanapanit
- The Legend of King Naresuan The Great, Part II, Reclaiming Sovereignty (2007) as Lord Ram
- Eternity (2010) as Thip
- The Legend of King Naresuan The Great, Part III, Naval Battle (2011) as Lord Ram
- The Outrage (2011) as King
- Jan Dara the Beginning (2012) as Luang Vissanun-decha
- Jan Dara: The Finale (2013) as Luang Vissanun-decha
- Plae Kao (2014) as Headman Rueang
- Mae Bia (2015) as Tim
- Six Characters (2022) as Suriya

Television series

- Lod Lai Mungkorn (Through The Dragon's Stripes) (1992) as Tian Suepanit
- Sarawat Yai (1994 version) as Pol Capt Methee On-aen
- Lueat Khao Ta (1995) as Inspector Amorn
- Hak Lin Chang (1996) as Somyot
- San Ti Ban (1996)
- See Pan Din (Four Reigns) (2004) as Luang Osot
- Suphapburut Juthathep: Khun Chai Rachanon (Gentlemen of Juthathep: Khun Chai Juthathep) (2013) as Field Marshal Kraisorn Wongsawan
- Lilawadee Plerng (The Secret Truth) (2015) as Songphol
- Lueat Tat Lueat (2015) as Lu Fei
- Sri Ayodhaya (2017–2020) as Phraya Pichai-chanrit
- Ley Luang (2021) as Director Krit
- The Betrayal (2023) as Bunya
