= Bongkoj Khongmalai =

Thai actress and producer

- บงกช คงมาลัย
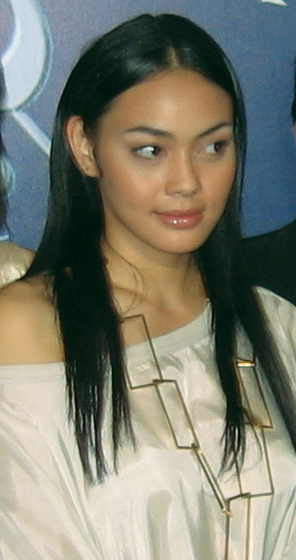
- Khongmalai at the premiere of King Naresuan in Bangkok, 2007
- Born: 15 April 1985 (age 41); Bangkok, Thailand
- Other name: Tak (ตั๊ก)
- Occupations: Actress; producer
- Known for: Somsong in Ai-Fak; Pla in Tom-Yum-Goong
- Height: 1.68 m (5 ft 6 in)
- Spouse: Boonchai Bencharongkul (m. 2013)
- Children: 1

Bongkoj Khongmalai (Thai: บงกช คงมาลัย; RTGS: Bongkot Khongmalai), nickname Tak (Thai: ตั๊ก; born 15 April 1985), is a Thai actress and producer.

== Career ==
Bongkoj has appeared in several films including Tom-Yum-Goong. She portrayed a young Thai woman forced into prostitution in Australia who comes to the aid of the film's hero, Tony Jaa. Alternate spellings of her name include Bongkot (or Bongkote) Kongmalai and Bonkoch Konmalaï. Her first film role was in Tanit Jitnukul's historical epic about the battle of Bang Rajan. She studies at Ramkhamhaeng University.

Bongkoj's major debut as a dramatic actress was in 2004's Ai-Fak, based on the S.E.A. Write Award-winning novel, Kham Phiphaksa (The Judgment), by Chart Korbjitti. She portrayed a mentally ill young woman who is married to a much older man. When her husband dies, her care is entrusted to the man's son, Fak, who is then ostracized by his fellow villagers because they believe he is having sexual relations with his stepmother.

In 2005, she was seen in Hit Man File, alongside Chatchai Plengpanich and Tom-Yum-Goong, which in 2006 was screened in the United States as The Protector. Also in 2006, she starred in the action comedy Chai Lai, about five female crimefighters, and then later in the year starred in the thriller, The Passion.

== Public image ==
In 2004, Bongkoj was at the center of a controversy when nude photos of her, taken on the set of Ai-Fak, appeared on the Thai Internet forum, Pantip.com. Police were able to track the uploader down and the man was arrested. Bongkoj asked that charges against the man be dropped after he issued a public apology, and she said she did so because the man hadn't smuggled the photos from the film set. A complaint was also filed against the film's production company for taking the photos.

In May 2012, Bongkoj generated a wave of criticism when she mocked the death of Thai prisoner Ampon Tangnoppakul in her Facebook status updates, describing his death as karma; a 62-year-old grandfather, Ampon had been jailed for sending text messages critical of Queen Sirikit. After the negative fan reaction, Bongkoj deleted the posts and apologized, but her royalist comments reflect deep prejudice in Thailand in favor of views of the country's monarchy and the overpowering influence of the Thai military.

== Personal life ==
Her mother, Thanapa "Lek" Chepnurak (passed away in 2017), was from Suphanburi, the same hometown as Yuenyong Opakul (Aed Carabao) of the Carabao band. They are cousins, which makes her a niece of Yuenyong. In addition, she is also related as a cousin to Artiwara Kongmalai (Toon Bodyslam) of the Bodyslam band.

She married Boonchai Bencharongkul CEO of DTAC in 2013, with the husband being significantly older. The couple has one son together.

== Filmography ==
=== Films ===
- Bang Rajan (2000) as Sa
- Khun pan (Legend of the Warlord) (2002) as Phimphilalai
- Ai-Fak (The Judgement) 2004 as Somsong
- The Story of the X-Circle (2004)
- Gin gwai 10 (The Eye 10) (2005)
- Sum muepuen (Hit Man File) (2005)
- Tom-Yum-Goong (The Protector) (2005) as Pla
- Chai Lai (2006) as Rose
- The Passion (2006)
- Up to You (2006)
- Tewada Ta Ja Teng (Theng's Angel) (2008)
- Jan Dara The Beginning (2012) as Aunt Wat
- Jan Dara The Finale (2013) as Aunt Wat

=== Television ===
- Sum Saban Nga (1997)
- Look mae (1999)
- Niraj Sorng pop (2002)
- Sanae Jun (2004)
- Lady Bar (French) (2007)
- Sao Noi (2012)
- Sri Ayodhaya (2017)
- Sri Ayodhaya 2 (2019)
- Mia Luang (2021)
- Lai Kinnaree (TBA)
