= Sawika Chaiyadech =

Thai actress and singer

Savika Chaiyadej
- สาวิกา ไชยเดช
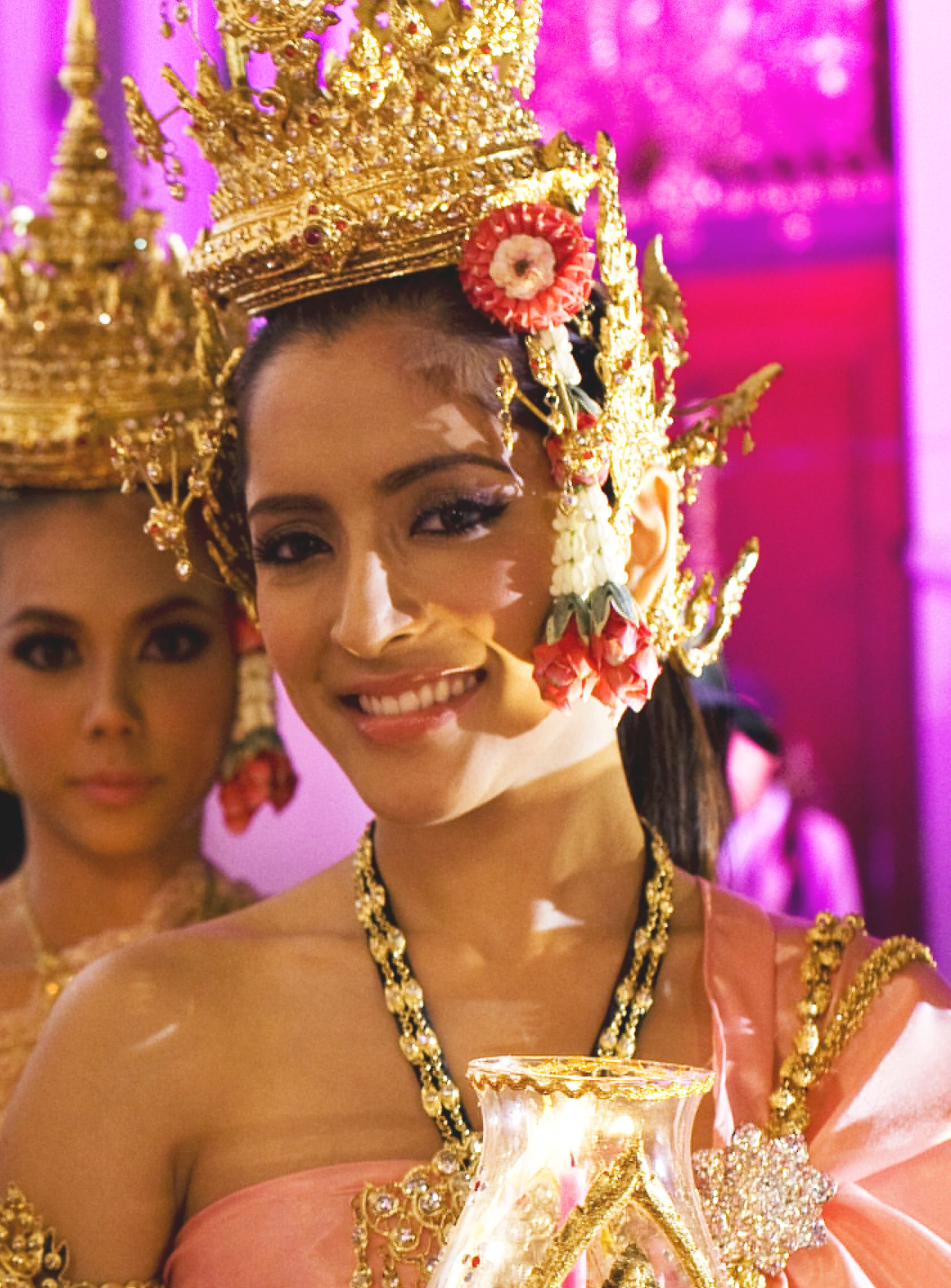
- Pinky in Bangkok (2009)
- Born: Savika Chaiyadej; 19 June 1986 (age 40); Bangkok, Thailand
- Other name: Pinky (พิ้งกี้)
- Occupations: Actress; singer; MC; YouTuber
- Years active: 1993–present
- Spouse: Itthi Chavalittamrong (m. 2014; div. 2017)

Signature
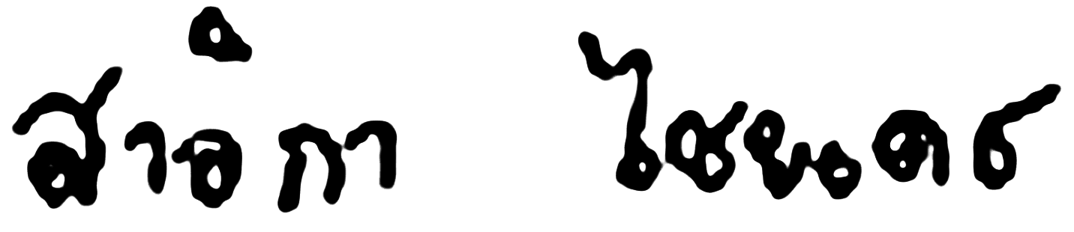

Savika Chaiyadej, also spelled Sawika Chaiyadech (Thai: สาวิกา ไชยเดช; RTGS: Sawika Chaiyadet; born 19 June 1986), nicknamed Pinky (พิ้งกี้), is a Thai actress and singer.

== Early life and education ==
Pinky was born on 19 June 1986, in Bangkok. She is of Chinese, English, Mon, Pakistani, and Thai heritage. She had an Islamic upbringing as her father is Muslim. Pinky has two elder brothers, one of which was also in her first childhood lakorn. She graduated from Rangsit University with a bachelor's degree in Liberal Arts and later received a master's degree from Chalermkarnchana University.

== Career ==
Pinky has been in the entertainment business since she was around 8 years old, first seen in a Sony Trinitron commercial, appearing with an ape/gorilla. She rose to fame in her teenage years when she starred alongside Veerapaph Suparbpaiboon in the action adventure lakorn, Angkor 2, and portrayed as a princess who was cursed by a sorcerer.

Pinky also worked in the South Indian film industry. She made her debut in the 2011 Tamil film Markandeyan and played the female lead in the 2014 Telugu film, Emo Gurram Egaravachu opposite the popular star Sumanth which was released on 24 January 2014.

== Lawsuit ==
On 18 August 2022, she and her mother Sarinya Chaiyadej, and her elder brother Surayuth Chaiydej were among 19 people arrested for allegedly defrauding people of money via a "Forex-3D scam". There are 9,824 victims in this case and the total damage value is 2.4 billion baht. The Criminal Court ruled against bail, Pinky and her mother were imprisoned at the Central Women's Penitentiary.

== Filmography ==
=== Film ===
Year	Title	Role	Notes
1994	Daughter เสียดาย	(Duen's sister)	
2005	The Holy Man หลวงพี่เท่ง	Paneang	
2007	Chum Taang Rot Fai Phee ชุมทางรถไฟผี	Ratri	
2011	Markandeyan	Divya	Indian-Tamil Film
2012	Jan Dara the Beginning จันดารา ปฐมบท	Hi-sinh / Dara	
2013	Jan Dara: The Finale จันดารา ปัจฉิมบท	Hi-sinh / Dara	
2014	Emo Gurram Egaravachu	Neelaveni	Indian-Telugu Film
2014	The Rooms; Hong lork lorn	Pie	
2014	Love Slave ทาสรักอสูร	N/A	
2018	Hor Taew Tak 6 หอแต๋วแตก แหกต่อไม่รอแล้วนะ	N/A	
2019	Boxing Sangkran สงกรานต์ แสบสะท้านโลกันต์	N/A	
2020	The Maid; The Maid สาวลับใช้	Uma	

=== Television ===
Year	Title	Role	Notes	Channel
1993	Fai Nai Duang Ta	Patcha (Joorai’s daughter)	Support Role	Channel 3
1993	Wan Nee Tee Ror Khoi	Bralee / Mhanfah (Young)	Support Role	Channel 7
1993	Kert Tae Tom	Minggomud (Childhood)	Guest Role	Channel 7
1994	Bla Boo Tong	Auy / Ai (Young)	Support Role	Channel 7
1994	Khluen Chiwit	Jeerawat (Young)	Guest Role	Channel 3
1994	Dao Pra Sook	Dao Pra Sook (Young)	Support Role	Channel 7
1994	Plai Fon Ton Nao	Nokyoong	Support Role	Channel 7
1996	Pan Neung Ratree	Duangjun	Support Role	Channel 7
1997	Kaew Jom Gaen	Kaew	Main Role	Channel 5
1997	Niramit	Jao Saeng La (Young)	Guest Role	Channel 7
2001	Ngao Prissana	Meaw	Support Role	Channel 7
2001	Pinprai	Sritai	Support Role	Channel 7
2002	Hua Jai Klai Puen Tieng	Noi	Support Role	Channel 7
2003	Kassatriya	Lady Mani In	Support Role	Channel 5
2004	Koo Krang Kaeng Kun Keng	N/A	Main Role	Channel 7
2004	Nang Fah Duern Din	N/A	Support	Channel 7
2004	Choom Tang Ruk (2004)	Nithiwadee	Main Role	Channel 7
2005	Angkor 2	Nitcha	Main Role	Channel 7
2005	Kadee Ded...Haed Haeng Ruk	Sunisa	Main Role	Channel 7
2006	Kaen Kala	N/A	Main Role	Channel 7
2006	Sao Noi Loy Larn	Noi	Main Role	Channel 7
2006	Thida Satan	Tarnsai	Main Role	Channel 7
2007	Suparburoot Chao Din	Pakawadee / Tuk	Main Role	Channel 7
2007	Nong Miew Kiew Petch	Miew / Petch	Main Role	Channel 7
2008	Talard Nam Damnern Ruk Part 2 (2008)	Katteeya	Main Role	Channel 7
2008	Tur Keu Cheewit	On In / Tua Lek	Main Role	Channel 7
2008	Suparb Burut Satan	Latin / Lilly	Main Role	Channel 7
2008	Jao Ying Lum Sing	Jao Kwanwarin	Main Role	Channel 7
2009	Wung Nam Karng	Ratikarn	Main Role	Channel 7
2009	Wong Wien Hua Jai	Buphachart Pimyothakan / "Bow"	Main Role	Channel 7
2010	Ruk Sorn Rode	Fahsai	Main Role	Channel 7
2012	Thong Prakai Saed	Thong Prakai / Thong Dee	Main Role	Channel 8
2012	Marnya Risaya 2012	Deenee	Main Role	Channel 5
2012	Rachanee Look Toong	Kung Nang	Main Role	Channel 8
2013	Ga Gub Hong	Motdam / Monrudee	Main Role	Channel 8
2014	Koom Nang Kruan	Jao Nang Yodlah	Support Role	Channel 5
2015	Waen Tong Luang	Duangjai / Hathaithip Duangcheewan	Main Role	Channel 8
2017	Sri Ayodhaya	Amarindra	Support Role	True4U
2018	Muang Maya Live The Series: Maya Ruk On Lie	Chingching Gavisara	Main Role	One 31
2018	The Bitch War	Namrin	Main Role	Suddantai Thailand
2019	Poot Pissawat 2019	Sae	Support Role	One 31
2019	Sleepless Society Series: Bedtime Wishes	Nara	Main Role	One 31
2020	The Miracle	Goddess Isis	Main Role	True4U
2020	Club Friday The Series 12: Rak Sap Son	Prang	Main Role	GMM 25
2020	Khum Sab Lum Kong	Phetai / Pintra	Main Role	Channel 8
2021	‘’Reuan Rom Ngiw’’	Malai / Nira	Main Role	Channel 8
2021	Dare To Love: Hai Ruk Pipaksa	Camelia / “Cammy”	Support Role	Channel 3
2021	Luang Kah Lah Ruk	Phiangjan / Phandao	Main Role	PPTV HD
2022	The Kinnaree Conspiracy	Jao Jom Kinaree	Main Role	Channel 3
2022	Dong Dok Mai ดงดอกไม้		Main Role	One 31
TBA	Ruen Chadanang เรือนชฎานาง		Main Role	Channel 8
TBA	Pass to Your Voice สะพานปูน The series	Nongnit	Support Role	

== MC ==
Television

- 2018 : Mai Taw Mae On Air MCOT HD (1/6/2018-30/9/2018)

Online

- 2022 : [ YardKy Journey ] EP1 Teaser On Air YouTube:Pinky Savika Official
