= Chaiyapol Julien Poupart =

Thai model and actor

- ชัยพล จูเลี่ยน พูพาร์ต
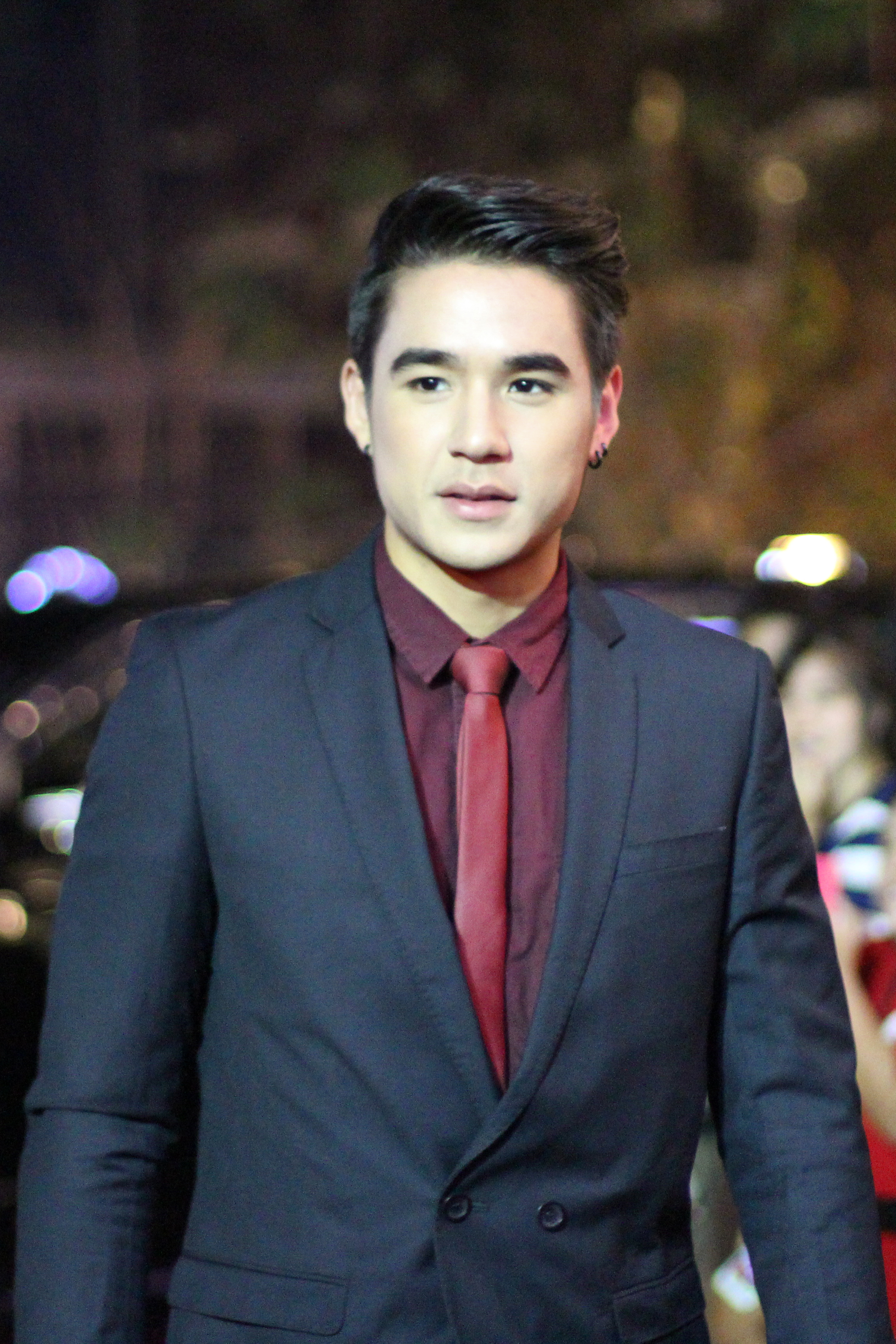
- Chaiyapol in 2016
- Born: Chaiyapol Julien Poupart; February 27, 1990 (age 36); Bangkok, Thailand
- Other names: New (Nickname); Chaiyapol Poupart
- Education: Chulalongkorn University (Faculty of Sport Science)
- Occupations: Actor; traveler; YouTuber
- Years active: 2008–present
- Agents: Exact (2008–2016); Channel 3 (2017–2020)
- Height: 1.80 m (5 ft 11 in)

Chaiyapol Julien Poupart (Thai: ชัยพล จูเลี่ยน พูพาร์ต; born February 27, 1990), is a Thai actor.

== Early life and education ==
Poupart was born in Bangkok to a Thai Belgian father and a Thai Chinese mother. He is the nephew of Michael Poupart and Oliver Poupart. Poupart graduated from primary school from Demonstration School, Srinakharinwirot University, Prasanmit (Primary School), secondary school from Patumwan Demonstration School, Srinakharinwirot University and a bachelor's degree from the Faculty of Sport Science, Chulalongkorn University, in Recreation and Sports Management (2nd class honors) as a budding fellow with Theeradej Methawarayuth.

== Career ==
His debut in the entertainment industry is through advertising from companies like KFC and DTAC. His role as an actor started from the drama called Kaew Lompetch, which is considered to be the birth of many new actors.

In 2011, Poupart was given the opportunity to play the role in his first film from ML Phan Thuanphetawakun, Pha Muang Tunnel. The following year was again approached by ML Phan Thuanphetawakun and the role of "Ken Krating-thong", a famous character in Thai erotic novels, which later were used to make the movie, Jan Dara the Beginning. The movie increased Poupart's reputation through his ability to play a variety of love scenes and has made the name of Poupart well-known.

== Filmography ==
=== Film ===
Year	Title	Role	Notes
2011	The Outrage	Aanan	Support Role
2012	Jan Dara the Beginning	Ken Krating-thong	Main Role
2013	Jan Dara: The Finale	Ken Krating-thong	Main Role
2014	Threesome	Rang	Main Role
2014	The Scar	Kwan	Main Role
2015	Love You 100K	Klao	Main Role
2015	Maebia	Businessman / Cloud La Lover	Support Role
2018	The Miracle of Naga Gem	Phon	Main Role
2021	Dark World	Leo	Main Role
2022	Six Characters	Akkhanee Kriangkrai	Support Role

=== Television series ===
Year	Title	Role	Network	Notes
2008	Kwarm Lub Kaung Superstar		Channel 5	Cameo
2008	Kaew Lorm Petch	Chanok	Channel 5	
2009	Sakul Ga	Patiya / Pu	Channel 5	
2010	Dok Ruk Rim Tang	Sithisak	Channel 5	
2011	Kohn Teun	BaanJerd	Channel 5	
2011	Kularb Satan	Chinphat Chanannop	Channel 5	
2011	Baan Nee Mee Ruk	Max	Modernine TV	Cameo
2012	Buang Ruk	Phettae	Channel 5	
2012	Bhen Khao	Top	Channel 3	Sitcom
2012	Look Pee Look Nong	Aof	Modernine TV	Sitcom Cameo
2013	Koo Gum 2013	Pholchai	Channel 5	Cameo (episode 14)
2013	Reuan Saneha	Meuang / Muang	Channel 5	
2014	Club Friday The Series Season 5: Secret of The 3 of Us	Joe	GMM 25	
2015	Kay Hard Dao	Songkhram Samphanphong (Kiao)	ONE 31	
2016	City of Light: The O.C. Thailand	Ryan / Ray	ONE 31	
2016	Sanaeha Karm Sen	Win	ONE 31	
2017	A Love to Kill	Kantapat Adulchai (Puen)	ONE 31	
2017	Rak Nakara	Nor Muang	Channel 3	
2018	Sanae Nang Ngiew	Dumgerng / "Gerng"	Channel 3	
2019	Wai Sab Saraek Kad 2	Pongkiat Komthumkun (Kru Pongkiat)	Channel 3	
2020	Fai Gam Prae	Tommanai Sayanyud (Tom)	GMM 25	
2020	Club Friday The Series 12 Ep. Rak Nee Mai Dai Mee Kae Seong Kon	Arm	GMM 25	
2021	Duang Jai Nai Montra	Wipoo Pasanatecho (Poo)	Channel 3	
2021	Lai Kinnaree	Monsieur Robert	Channel 3	Main Role
2021	Mae Nak Phra Khanong	Por Mak	Channel 9	
2022	Oh, Teacher Khong	Atsajan Thawornsakul		
2022	The Kinnaree Conspiracy	Monsieur Robert		
2024	Zodiac Slayer	Tham		
2024	Yesterday Wife	Phum		
2024	The Musical Murder	Khunphol		
2025	The Yarns	Pilanthorn Traikanon		

=== Mc ===
- 2016 Sports inspired by Supersports: Monday-Friday at 1.45 pm Broadcasting ONE 31
- 2017–Present The First Ultimate Broadcasting PPTV

=== Music Videos ===
- The song falls in love with Wai Kamikaze
- Music for permission ... Concern of Dome The Star
- Songs Bangkok Allergy (feat. Takhakan Chlada) of Pang Nakarin
- The music of Ying Lee Si Chumphon

== Awards ==
- Award for Best Supporting Actor, Karp Chad Luek Award, the 10th time from the drama "Buongrak"
- Silver Doll Award Outstanding young actor The 29th Phra Surasawadee Royal Award from the movie Jan Dara the Beginning for the year 2012
