= Boonchai Bencharongkul =

Thai millionaire business executive and art collector

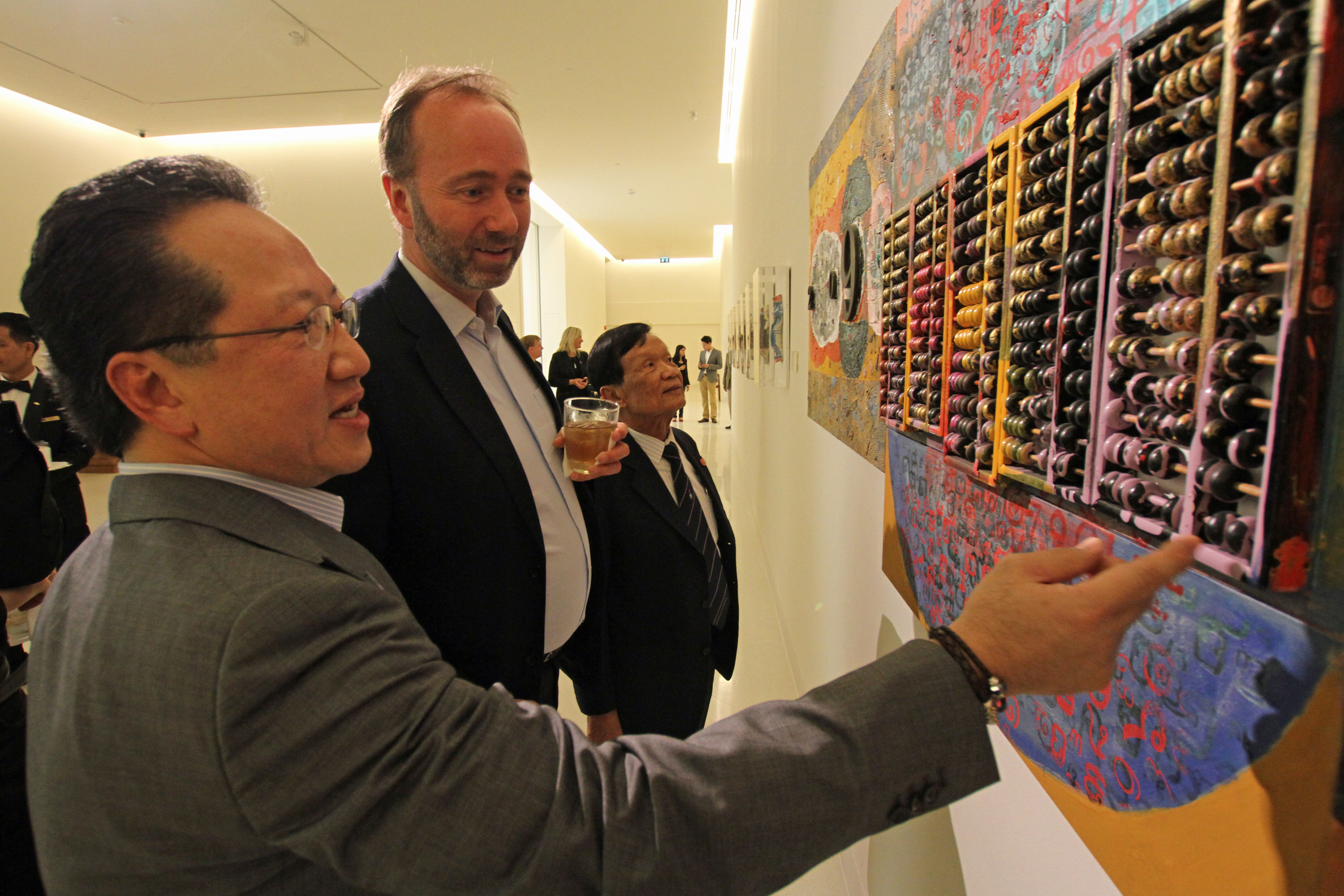
Boonchai (in front) at the Museum of Contemporary Art in 2013

Boonchai Bencharongkul (Thai: บุญชัย เบญจรงคกุล, born 25 June 1954) is a Thai millionaire business executive and art collector. He is the founder and chairman of DTAC, Thailand's third-largest mobile phone operator.

The eldest of four children, Boonchai was brought into the family business by his father Suchin, who had built the business by partnering with Motorola. Boonchai was 27 when his father died in 1981, leaving him the business as well as a lot of debt amid numerous lawsuits. He eventually persevered, closing down and offloading some branches of the business, and shifted its focus to the growing telecommunications industry. The business boomed, but was badly affected by the 1997 Asian financial crisis. Boonchai then turned to partnership with Norway-based Telenor. He and his three siblings sold most of their shares in 2005, though he has remained as the company's chairman.

Boonchai has long had an interest in art, and is an avid art collector, owning one of the largest private collections in Thailand. In 2012, he built the Museum of Contemporary Art in Bangkok to showcase his collection. Personally, he is a follower of the Dhammakaya movement—he found that Buddhism and meditation had helped him through his father's death and the financial crisis. He married his sixth wife, actress Bongkoj Khongmalai, in 2013.
