= Ai-Fak =

Ai-Fak (The Judgment)
- The Thai movie poster.
- Directed by: Pantham Thongsangl
- Written by: Chart Korbjitti; Pantham Thongsangl
- Starring: Pitisak Yaowananon; Bongkoj Khongmalai
- Distributed by: GMM Pictures
- Release date: March 24, 2004
- Running time: 110 minutes
- Country: Thailand
- Language: Thai

Ai-Fak (Thai: ไอ้ฟัก) is a 2004 Thai drama film. It is based on the S.E.A. Write Award-winning novel by Chart Korbjitti, Khamphiphaksa (The Judgment, also the English-language title for the film).

== Plot ==
A young man, Fak, is a revered novice Buddhist monk, and the entire village has turned out to the local temple to hear him preach a sermon. Fak's talk is interrupted a coughing fit by his widower father, though, and Fak struggles to maintain his focus. Fak then decides he must put aside his aspirations for monkhood to take care of his father. Then he is conscripted by lottery into the army. He hopes that when he completes his national service, he will return to the village, be ordained as a monk and devote his life to religion.

On his return home from the army, the bus to his village breaks down. During the stop, Fak steps over to the side of the road, near a lotus pond, to urinate. There, among the lotus, he sees a beautiful woman bathing, fully clothed (as is customary in Thailand). Fak zips up and eventually arrives at home, where he finds his father in a very happy state. His father's reason for being so happy is that he has remarried. Fak's stepmother then appears from behind a mosquito net: it's the woman from the lotus pond. Her name is Somsong, and though she is sweet and devoted, there is something clearly wrong with her, perhaps some type of mental illness.

Though there are happy times, with Fak joining his father at work as a janitor for the local school, his reunion with his father is short-lived after his father becomes ill and dies. Because Fak made a promise to his father that he would look after his stepmother, Fak's goal of returning to the monkhood must again be put aside.

Though Fak is well liked in the village, the villagers do not like Somsong and have labeled her "crazy". And after Fak's father's death, the villagers start to treat Fak differently: they believe he is having an affair with his stepmother. Fak at first ignores the gossip, but it becomes harder and harder to deny because of Somsong's behavior. On one occasion, during a likay performance at a village fair, Fak is accosted by Somsong after she sees Fak talking with a young woman. Somsong is suffering from delusions that she and Fak are married, and she is jealous. Somsong also has the unfortunate habit of shedding her clothes and running naked in public, or simply lifting her dress and exposing herself. During one of these episodes, some villagers happen upon Fak just as he's chased the nude Somsong down and is attempting to cover her up. But what the villagers think they are witnessing is Fak having sex with his stepmother. Fak has been judged.

Fak has taken his father's old job as school janitor. One day a dog that's thought to be rabid wanders onto the school grounds. Fak is given the job of killing it. He grabs a hoe and uses it to strike the animal, hitting it with a glancing blow that only injures it and makes it angrier. Fak eventually finishes the snarling dog off, but it is a bloody task. For a brief moment, Fak is seen as a hero by the students and faculty, and he feels a bit better about himself.

Fak must prepare for his father's cremation. He invites the school's headmaster, the village headman and others. He orders 50 sandalwood blossoms for attendees to place on the burning casket. But no one shows up for the ceremony, except for the monks he engaged to chant over his father, and the local undertaker.

Fak makes friends with the undertaker, a lowly person who is not well liked by the superstitious villagers because they believe he is unclean. Even Fak didn't particularly like the man, but after Fak tells him that he has never had sexual relations with Somsong, the man believes him.

After the cremation rite, the undertaker offers Fak some rice whiskey. Fak at first doesn't like the taste or the way it makes him feel. But he has a few more drinks and starts enjoy himself. Looking for relief from the pressure of taking care of his mentally ill stepmother and the harsh judgment of the villagers, Fak turns to the bottle and becomes an alcoholic. His downward spiral continues until he has angered the villagers, and they turn on him and beat him, leaving him to be assisted home by Somsong.

== Cast ==
- Pitisak Yaowananon as Fak
- Bongkoj Khongmalai as Somsong

== Accolades ==
- 2004 Thailand National Film Association Awards: Best actor for Pitisak Yaowananon

== Controversy ==
- Nude photos were taken on the film set of Bongkoj Khongmalai and uploaded to the popular Thai Internet forum Pantip.com. Police arrested a man but the actress asked that charges against the man be dropped after he issued a public apology. She then filed a complaint against the film's production company for taking the photos.
