= Lucky Girl (album) =

Studio album by Katreeya English
- Released: 16 December 2005 (Thailand)
- Recorded: 2005
- Genre: T-pop; dance-pop; R&B
- Language: Thai
- Label: GMM Grammy

Katreeya English chronology
Siamese Kat (2003)	Lucky Girl (2005)	Sassy K (2007)

Lucky Girl is the third studio album by Thai pop singer Katreeya English. It was released by GMM Grammy on December 16, 2005 in Thailand. The album includes the singles "Burn", "Baby I Miss You", and "I Think I (Thai Version)". The singles from the album were successful. The EP single "I Think I" going to top ten on the Thai charts after success with the song "Nok Sai Ta" from her debut album Kat Around The Clock in 2001.

== Track listing ==
1. "Burn" - 3:43
2. "Zarb sar" : "ซาบซ่า" - 3.42
3. "Baby I miss you" - 3:51
4. "Oh baby" - 3:42
5. "I Think I (Thai version)" - 3:57
6. "Game" : "เกม" -3.43
7. "Move ya body" - 3.28
8. "Hai jai ting" : "หายใจทิ้ง" - 3.47
9. "Poo ying khee klard" : "ผู้หญิงขี้ขลาด" - 4.01
10. "Lucky girl" - 4.17
11. "Mai mee took mai mee pid" : "ไม่มีถูกไม่มีผิด" - 3.35

== Singles ==
1. "Burn"
2. "Baby I Miss You"
3. "I Think I" (Thai version)

=== EP single ===
"I Think I (Thai version)" was the first release of the album on the radio before the song "Burn" had released as the first single. And finally the song "I Think I" released as the third single. It's the cover of Korean song originally on the Full House original soundtrack album recorded by Byul. There are two music videos to "I Think I (Thai version)". The first was done for Video CD Karaoke and the second was done for TV music stations.
