= Rhatha Phongam =

Thai actress, singer and model (born 1983)

- รฐา โพธิ์งาม
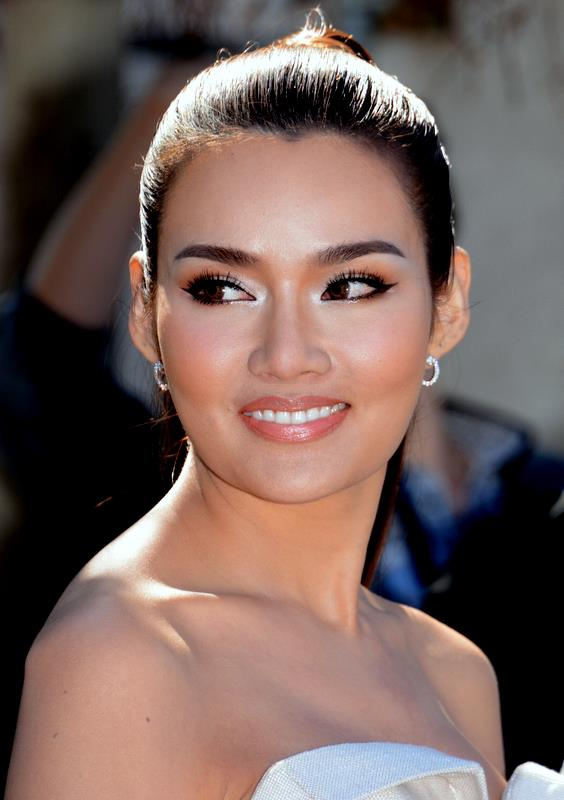
- Rhatha at the 2013 Cannes Film Festival.
- Born: Weerawun Phongam; May 19, 1983 (age 43); Bangkok, Thailand
- Education: Bangkok University
- Occupations: Actress; model; singer; YouTuber
- Years active: 1998–present
- Partner: Athul (หญิง)
- Relatives: Noi Phongam (mother); Suthep Po-ngam (uncle)
- Musical career
- Also known as: Yaya Ying
- Genres: Pop; R&B
- Labels: GMM Grammy; MusicCream

Rhatha Phongam (Thai: รฐา โพธิ์งาม; RTGS: Ratha Pho-ngam; born 19 May 1983), nickname Ying (Thai: หญิง), is a Thai actress and singer. She is best known internationally for her supporting role in Only God Forgives in 2013.

She is the daughter of a female comedian Noi Phongam and the niece of actor-comedian Suthep Po-ngam.

She has obtained a bachelor and a master's degree in Communication Arts from Bangkok University.

== Filmography ==
=== Television series ===
Year	Title	Role
1999	Raberd Terd Terng	Ying (Guest)
2004	Fak Din Klin Dao	Buarai
2012	Tom Yum Rum Shing	Fahsi
2012	The Sixth Sense	Monlada / Baimon / Wayo
2012	Raeng Ngao	Saiwarin
2013	Dao Kiao Duen	Onuma
2013	Paap Ataan	Saluayket / Ketlada
2013	My Melody 360 Ongsa Rak	Rose
2013	Carabao	Nampetch
2015	Luead Mungkorn	Yokmanee
2015	Sud Kaen Saen Rak	Sudarat Mankij
2016	Kamlai Mas	Sawita Saengpetch / Lompetch
2016	Tian Mimi Rak Ni Chua Niran	Tingting Saelim
2017	Tawan Yor Saeng	Primprao
2017	Suea Chani Keng Season 2	Oil
2017	Sri Ayodhaya	Jao Jom Ratree
2018	Suea Chani Keng Season 3	Oil
2018	Club Friday Season 9	Mat
2018	Secret Moon	Janerawee
2018	Seua Chanee Gayng: Freshy	Oil
2019	Suea Chani Keng Season 4	"Oil" Aphisara
2019	A Gift For Whom You Hate	Khru Kim
2020	Suea Chani Keng Season 5	Oil
2020	Fai Sin Chua	Vichuda
2020	Kadee Rak Kham Pop	Matthanin Saengsen
2021	Suea Chani Keng Season 6	Oil
2022	Drag, I Love You	Lucy
2022	Mummy Tee Rak	Sarinta
2022	Club Friday Love & Belief	Phatcha
2022	To Sir, with Love	Cai Xiao Tong
2023	The Office Games	Duangduea
2024	The Musical Murder	Khwanruthai
2025	House of Flames	Duean
2025	Game of Succession	Nuanjan Hemaratsiri
2025	Khemjira	Ketkaew (Ep. 9, 12)
2025	Love in the Moonlight	Rachawadi
2026	The Evil Lawyer	Jittri

=== Films ===
Year	Title	Role	Notes
2012	Jan Dara the Beginning	Boonlueang	Thai
2013	Tom Yum Goong 2	No. 20	Thai
2013	Angel (2013 film)	Roong	Thai
2013	The Second Sight 3D	Joom	Thai
2013	Only God Forgives	Mai	Hollywood
2013	Jan Dara: The Finale	Boonlueang	Thai
2014	Lupin the 3rd	Miss V	Japanese
2016	Mechanic: Resurrection	Renee Tran	Hollywood
2019	SisterS	Ratree	Thai
2021	One for the Road	TaK	Thai
2022	Fistful of Vengeance	Ku An Qi	Hollywood
2025	The Tutor	Wanna	Thai

=== Plays ===
Year	Title	Role	Notes
2007	Heaven and Sand The Musical	Kaech chee ya	Main Cast
2012	Mae Bia The Musical	Mekhla	Lead Role
2015	Wan Sal-a sode kub jode kao kao	-	Lead Role

=== Voice roles ===
Films
Year	Title	Role	Notes
2014	Maleficent	Maleficent	Thai dub
2014	Lupin the 3rd	Miss V	Thai dub
2019	Maleficent: Mistress of Evil	Maleficent	Thai dub

== Discography ==
=== Solo albums ===
Year	Title
1998	Yaya Ying
2001	Jeedd!
2003	Khor Thod Na Ka Khor Thod

=== Special albums ===
Year	Title	With
2001	Cheer Female	None
2001	2002 Rah Tree	Katreeya English, China Dolls and Jennifer Politanont
2003	Cover Girls	Zaza, Suthapong Phongkul, 3G, Baby V.O.X, Jam, China Dolls
2004	Wan Wan 1-2	None
2004	Cover Girls 2	Zaza, Suthapong Phongkul, Mod 3G, Lisa Bubblegirl
2005	2005 Tiwa Hula Hula	Katreeya English, China Dolls and Jennifer Politanont
2006	2007 Show Girls	Katreeya English China Dolls (except Hwa Hwa) and Jennifer Politanont
2009	Brazia	China Dolls and Jennifer Politanont

=== Singles ===
Year	Title	Native Title
2013	เด้งเด้งเด้ง	Deng Deng Deng
2017	อย่าแผ่ว	Ya Phaew
2017	อยากสวย	Yak Suay
2018	ไม่อยากเป็นแบบนี้	Mai Yak Pen Baeb Nee

=== Soundtracks ===
Year	Song title	Drama/Movie Title	Notes	Notes (2)	Featuring
2004	ฝากดินกลิ่นดาว; Fak Din Klin Dao	ฝากดินกลิ่นดาว; Fak Din Klin Dao	Drama	Thai	Sarawut Martthong
2005	เข้ามาใกล้ๆ; Khaw ma kli kli	ตลาดน้ำดำเนินฯ...รัก; Taladnaam Dumnern	Drama	Thai	-
2012	ของรักของหวง korng ruk kong haung	ต้มยำลำซิ่ง; Tom Yum Lum Sing	Drama	Thai	-
2012	รักแท้ไม่มีจริง; Ruk Thae Mai Me Jing	The Sixth Sense สื่อรักสัมผัสหัวใจ; The Sixth Sense Seu Rak Sampad Haujai	Drama	Thai	-
2013	เพลงที่เขียนไม่จบ; Pleng Ti Khien Mai Cob	จิตสัมผัส 3D; The Second Sight 3D	Movie	Thai	-
2013	ใจอ่อน; Falling In Love	Only God Forgives	Movie	Hollywood	-
2014	เก็บด้วยน้ำตา; Keb Dauy Nam tar	เลือดมังกร ตอน หงส์ LueadMungKorn - Hong	Drama	Thai	-
2016	เถียนมีมี่ Thien Mi Mi	เถียนมีมี่ รักเธอชั่วนิรันดร์ Thien Mi Mi Ruk Ther Chaw Ni Ran	Drama	Thai	-
2016	เสือ ชะนี เก้ง; Suea Chani Keng	อย่าชะล่าใจ; Xya Chala Jai	Sitcom	Thai	Tanatat Chaiat & Pongsak Rattanapong

== Music video appearances ==
Year	Song	Singer
2003	พูดทำไม (Phud Tham-mai)	Popetorn Soonthornyanakij

== Awards and nominations ==
Year	Award	Category	Work	Result
2002	Top Awards 2002	Best Youth Singing Group	2002 Ratree	Nominated
2012	Top Awards 2012	Best Rising Female Star (Film)	Jan Dara the Beginning	Won
2012	2012 Entertainment Reporters Association of Thailand Awards	Outstanding Rising Star* (Special Award)	Jan Dara the Beginning	Nominated
2013	23rd Suphannahong National Film Awards	Best Supporting Actress	Angel (2013 film)	Nominated
2013	2nd Kerd Awards	Kerd Award of the Year	—	Nominated
2013	Siamdara Stars Awards 2013	Best Actress (Film)	Jan Dara: The Finale	Nominated
