= The Maid (2020 film) =

2020 Thai horror film

- Film poster
- Directed by: Lee Thongkham
- Written by: Lee Thongkham; Piyaluk Tuntisrisakul
- Starring: Savika Chaiyadej; Teerapat Sajakul; Ploy Sornarin
- Cinematography: Brandt Hackney
- Production companies: Thongkham Films; Global Film Station
- Distributed by: Netflix
- Release date: 9 July 2020
- Running time: 100 minutes
- Country: Thailand
- Language: Thai

The Maid is a 2020 Thai supernatural slasher film directed by Lee Thongkham, written by Lee Thongkham and Piyaluk Tuntisrisakul starring Ploy Sornarin. The film was released on Netflix on 9 July 2020.

== Plot ==
Joy (Ploy Sornarin) is hired as a housemaid by a wealthy family consisting of Uma (Savika Chaiyadej), Nirach (Theerapat Sajakul), and their only child and daughter, Nid (Keetapat Pongrue). Mrs. Wan (Natanee Sitthisaman), the head housemaid, reminds Joy not to pry into the affairs of their employers. Joy experiences odd occurrences around the house, and - ignoring Wan's warning - sneaks into Uma's study at night. She finds a photo of Uma, Nirach, and housemaid Ploy; Ploy is Joy's missing sister. The house is haunted by Ploy's ghost, and only Joy and Nid can see it.

Joy learns of the circumstances surrounding Ploy's death from the ghost. Uma and Nirach have a loveless marriage, and each had a separate intimate relationship with Ploy. Ploy and Nirach had a child, Nid, causing resentment from Uma. Later, Ploy suffered a serious accident. Uma found Ploy first and refused to give or summon aid. Ploy was seemingly dead by the time the rest of the household responded. The household buried Ploy alive, not noticing that she had begun breathing again when their task was nearly complete.

Joy exacts revenge. During a party she murders Uma, Nirach, household staff, and guests, before setting the house on fire and leaving with Nid.

== Cast ==
- Ploy Sornarin as Joy
- Kannaporn Puangtong as Ploy, Joy's elder sister
- Savika Chaiyadej as Uma
- Teerapat Sajakul as Nirach
- Chi Wah Wong as Lung Sakchai (Uma's Father)
- Ratchanok Suwannaket as Fon
- Venus Saksiri as Joy's friend
- Natanee Sitthisaman as Wan
- Ounruan Rachote
- Alina Homsangpradit as Doctor
- Keetapat Pongrue as Nid
- Sorabodee Changsiri

== Reception ==
The South China Morning Post said the "screenplay is clumsy, and the director’s slow-burn approach does the film no favours."
