= Sassy K =

Studio album by Katreeya English
- Released: 26 June 2007 (Thailand)
- Recorded: 2007
- Genre: T-pop; dance-pop
- Language: Thai
- Label: GMM Grammy

Katreeya English chronology
Lucky Girl (2005)	Sassy K (2007)

Sassy K is the fourth studio album by Thai singer Katreeya English released on 26 June 2007.

== Track listing ==
1. "ท้าพิสูจน์ (Tah pi-sood)"
2. "ใช่สิ (Chai si)"
3. "ต่างคนต่างหวัง (Tarng khon tarng wung)"
4. "เหตุผลที่หายใจ (Hed-phon tee hai jai)"
5. "อย่ามัวคิด (Yah mua kid)"
6. "รักสิคะ (Ruk si ka)"
7. "อาทิตย์เที่ยงคืน (Arthit tieng kuen)"
8. "แค่หนึ่งคำหนึ่งข้อความ (Kae nueng kum Nueng kor kwam)"
9. "กองไว้ (Gaung wai)"
10. "นอกสายตา (Remix) (Nok sai ta (Remix) )"

=== Bonus VCD ===
- "Behind the scene"
- "Sassy Step"
- "News Bonus"

== Singles ==
- ท้าพิสูจน์ (Tah Pi-Sood) - released as the lead single. The song was used as the background song in commercial of "Rexona dry-stick", and also was used as original soundtrack for thai drama "Payak Sow Sab E Lhee" on Thai TV 3.
- เหตุผลที่หายใจ (Hed-Phol Tee Hai Jai) - released as the second single. There are three music videos for "Hed-phol tee hai jai". The first video was done for "Video CD Karaoke". The second is early video, the video features Katreeya's feedback music career. And the official version was shot for music and music-related television stations.

=== Performance single ===
- ใช่สิ (Chai Si) - she performed this song on many TV shows, and during her album promotion.
