= Museum of Contemporary Art (Bangkok) =

Museum in Bangkok, Thailand

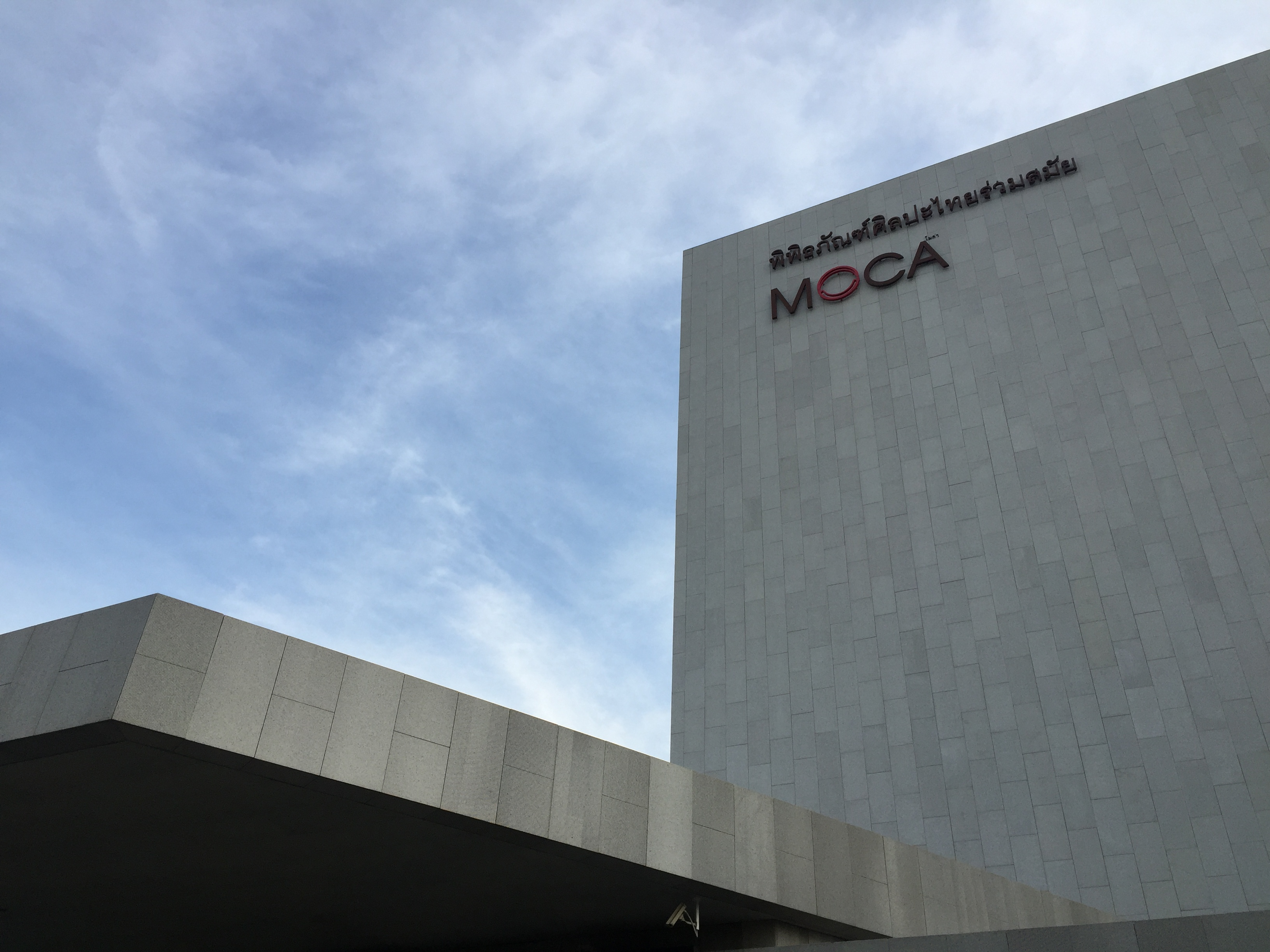
- Former name: Art Centre
- Established: 23 March 2012
- Location: 499 Kamphaeng Phet 6 Road Rd. Lat Yao, Chatuchak, Bangkok 10900
- Type: Contemporary art
- Founder: Boonchai Bencharongkul
- Website: mocabangkok.com

The Museum of Contemporary Art (MOCA) is an art museum in Bangkok, Thailand. It is privately owned by business executive Boonchai Bencharongkul and was opened in 2012. The museum, one of the largest contemporary art venues in Asia, features an extensive collection of works by Thai artists, including Thawan Duchanee, Hem Vejakorn, Chalermchai Kositpipat, and Prateep Kochabua.

== Artworks ==
MOCA has five floors, each displaying a different artistic theme.

=== First floor ===
There are four display halls. Two rooms are available for temporary exhibits, and another two halls are used to display the works of two National Artists and a Sculptor of Distinction. Works by National Artist Chalood Nimsamer are displayed as well as paintings that highlight important facets of current Thai art.

=== Third floor ===
The third floor features works related to the Thai epic poem Khun Chang Khun Phaen, including by Hem Vejakorn and Sukee Som-ngoen.

=== Fourth floor ===
This floor includes various works by Thawan Duchanee, Angkarn Kalayanapong, Panya Vijinthanasarn, and Prateep Kochabua.

=== Fifth floor ===
The floor displays modern art from different nations, including the United States, China, Vietnam, Malaysia, Japan, Russia, Italy, and Norway. It features works by John William Godward and Lawrence Alma-Tadema, among others.

== Gallery ==
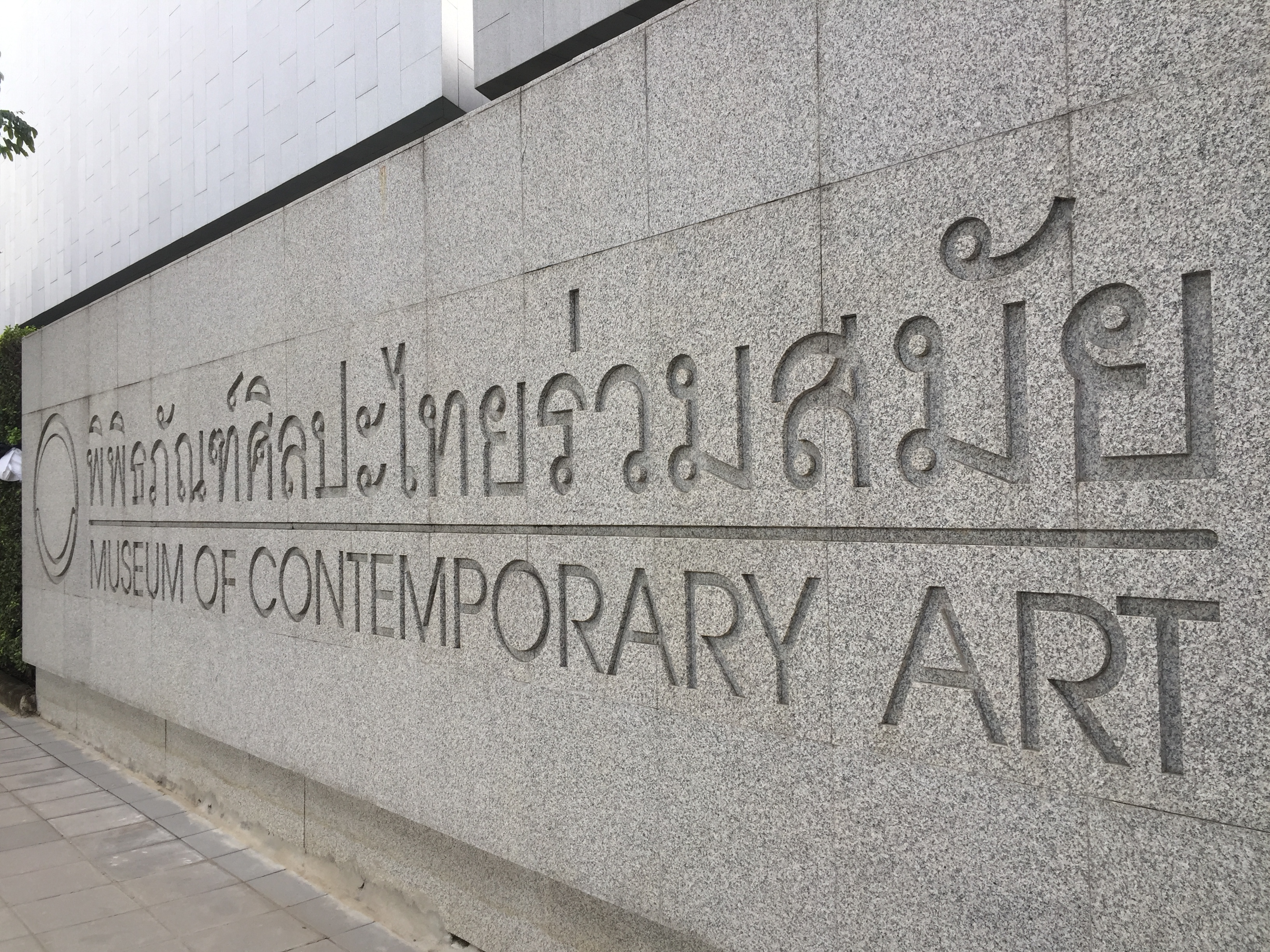
The Museum of Contemporary Art

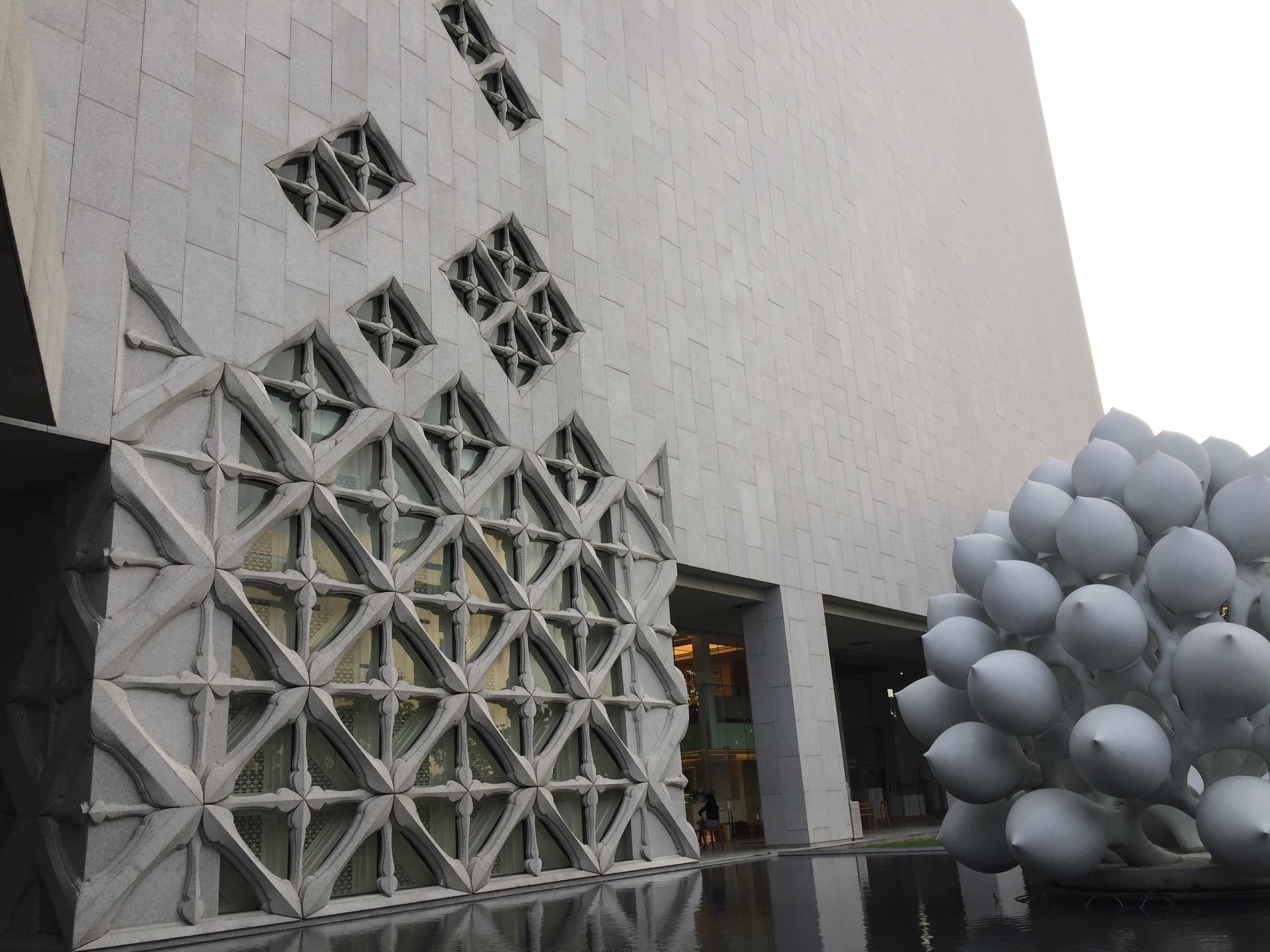
Sculpture in front of the museum

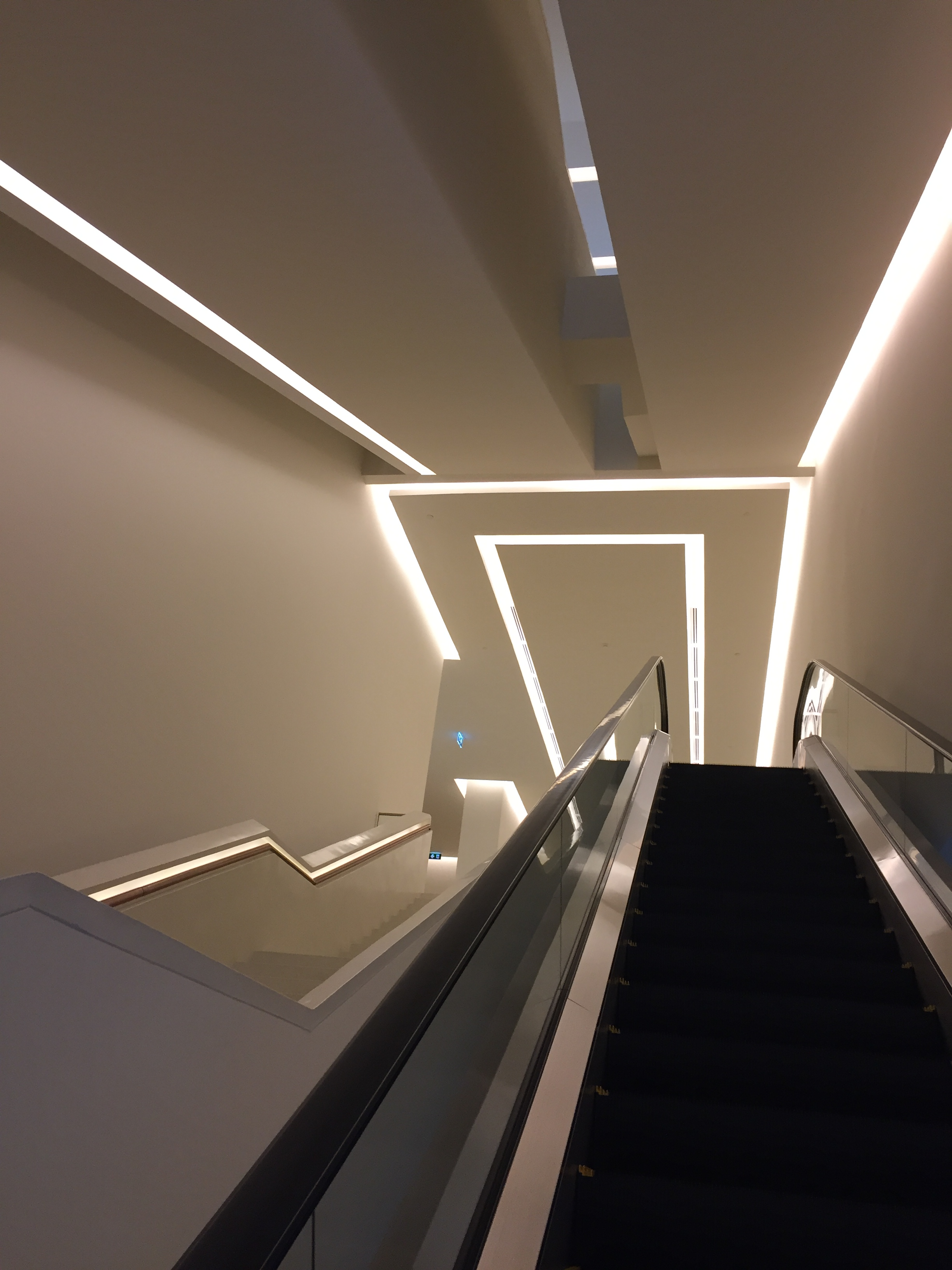
Inside the museum

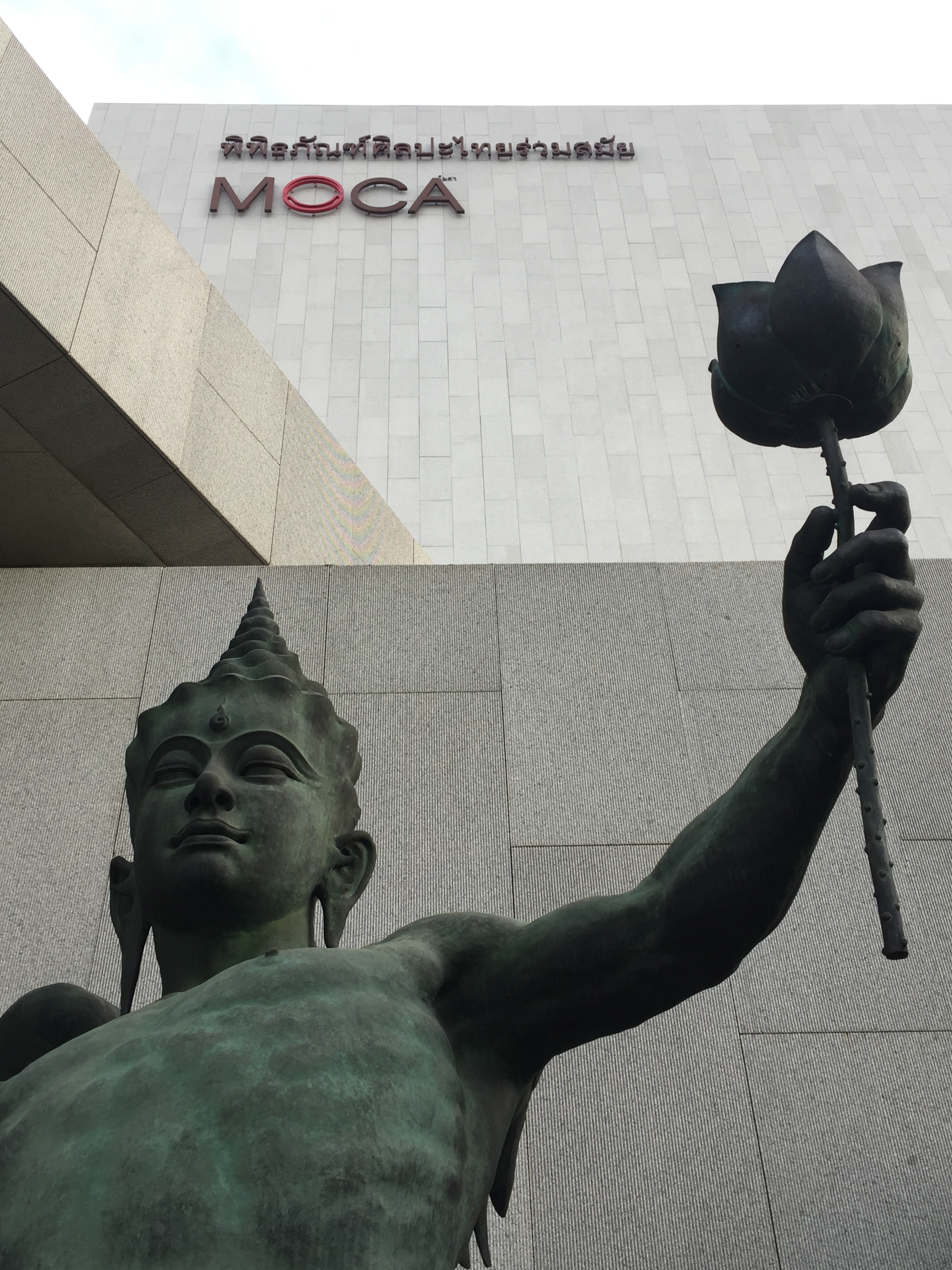
Kama (2014), by Thongchai Srisukprasert, on display near the entrance

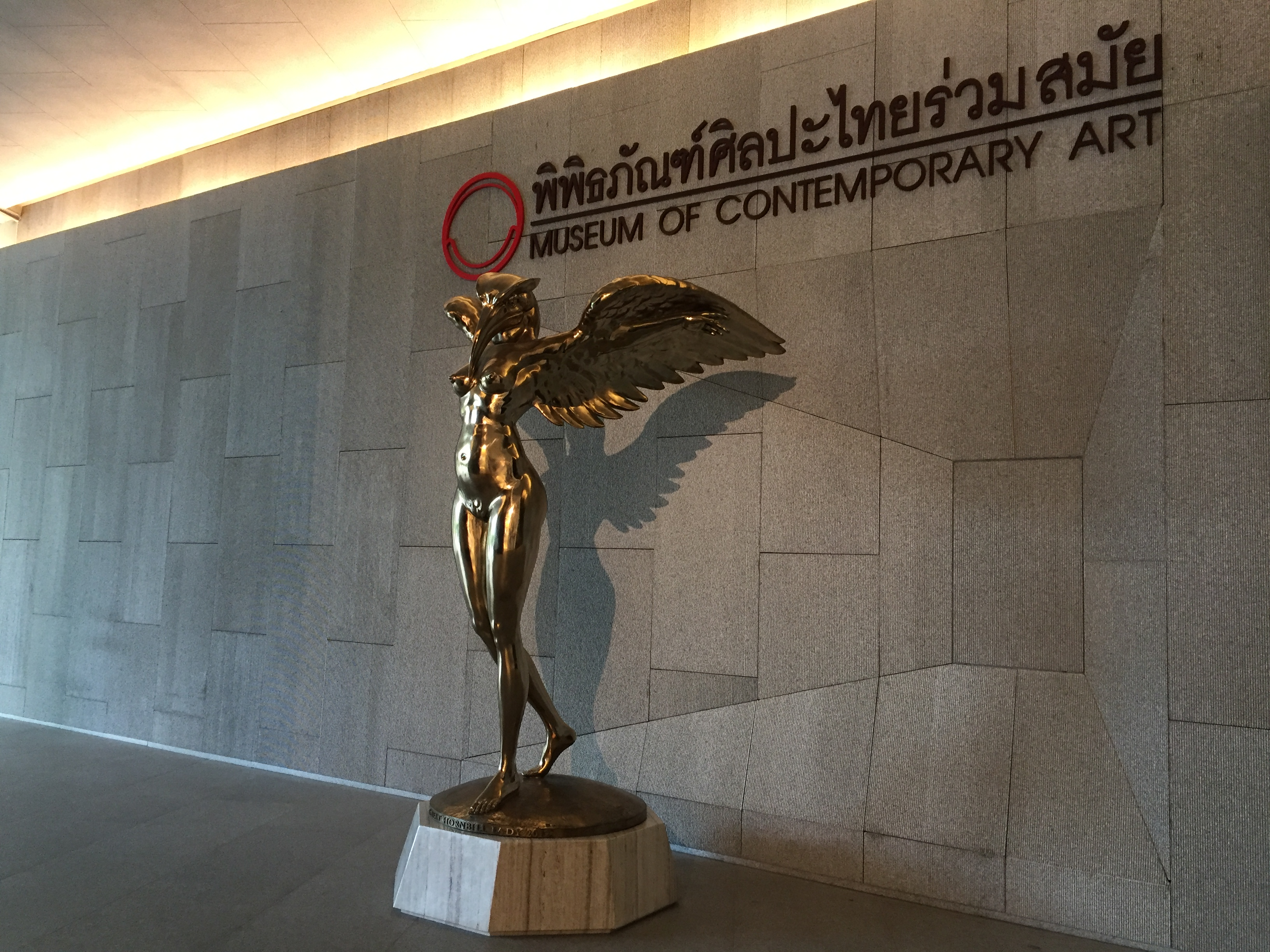
Great Hornbill Lady (2012) by Thongchai Srisukprasert, at the entrance of the museum

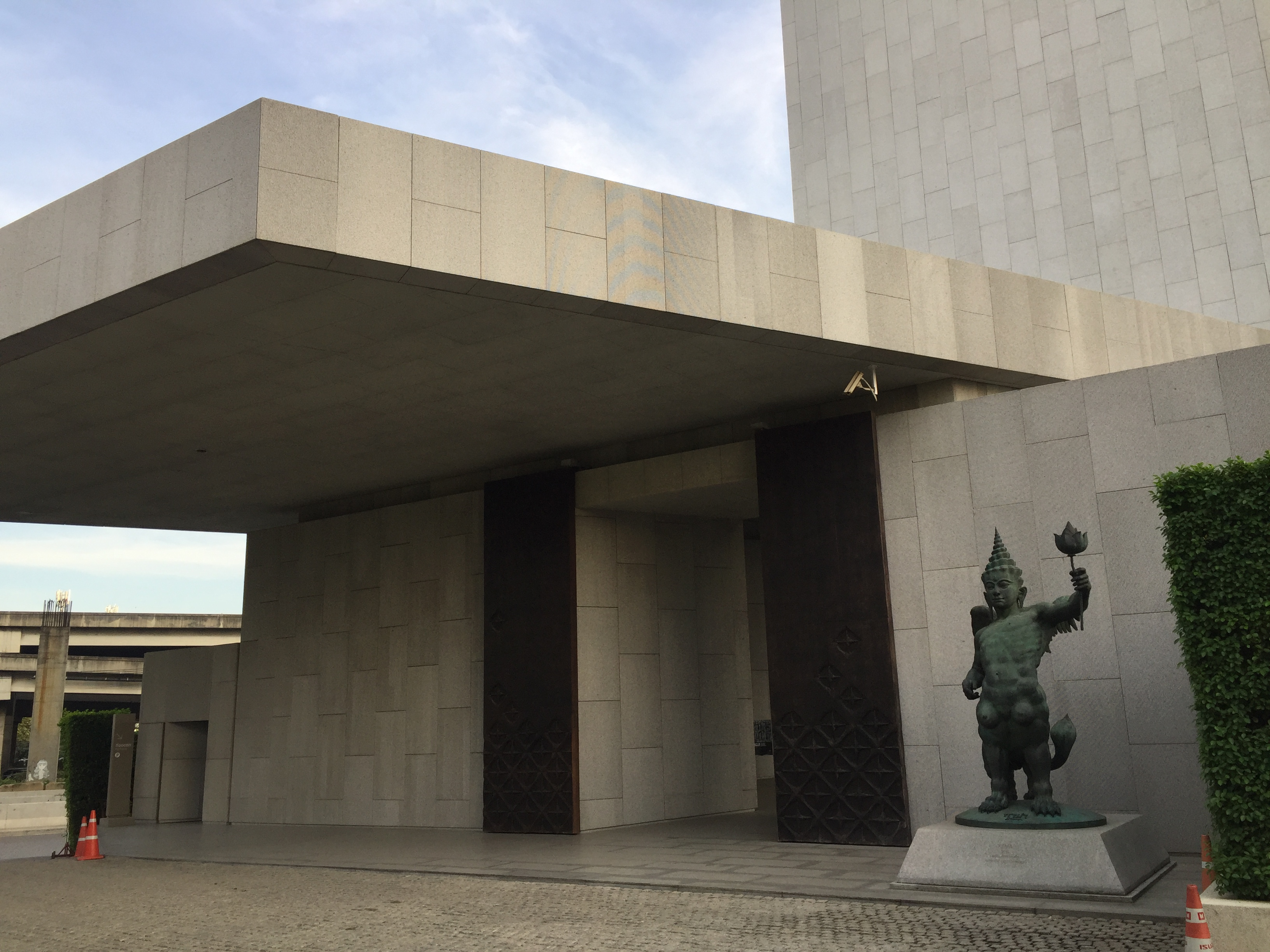
The Museum of Contemporary Art
