= Thanasit Jaturaput =

Thai singer (born 1989)

Thanasit Jaturaput ธนษิต จตุรภุช
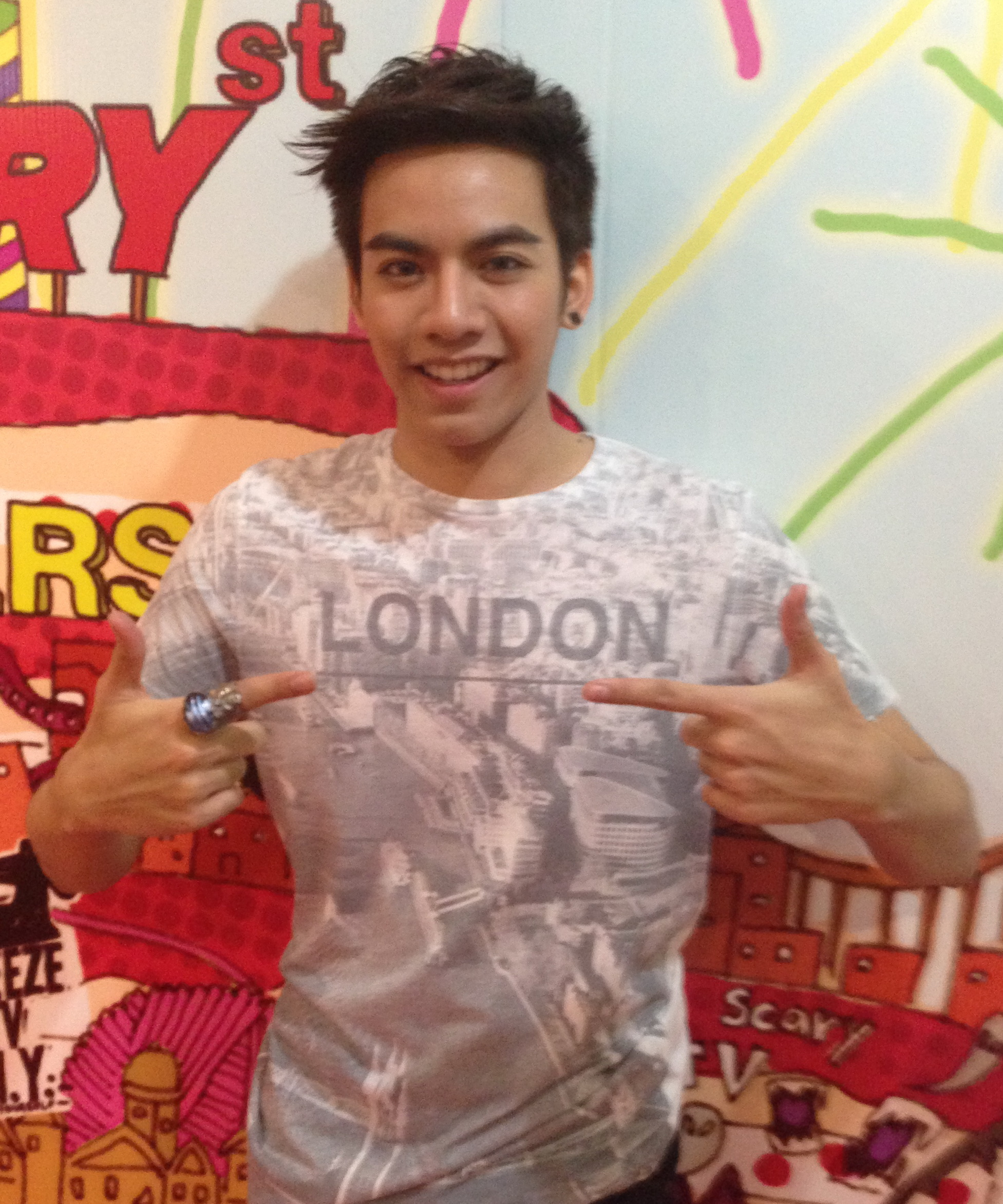
- Jaturaput in 2013

Background information
- Also known as: Ton
- Born: 4 July 1989 (age 36); Bangkok, Thailand
- Genres: Soul; Jazz; Pop; R&B
- Occupation: Singer
- Years active: 2011–present
- Labels: True Fantasia (2011–2017); I Am Music (2017–2019); Musiccream (2019–present)

Thanasit Jaturaput (Thai: ธนษิต จตุรภุช; also known as Ton (Thai: ต้น), born 4 July 1989) is a Thai singer and the winner of the eighth season of Academy Fantasia, a reality singing television competition.

== Early life and education ==
Thanasit was born in Bangkok, Thailand. He is the brother of Thai singer Warintorn Jaturaput. He completed his secondary education at Samsenwittayalai School. He was able to receive a scholarship for the AFS intercultural program where he had the opportunity to become an international exchange student for one year in Boise, Idaho and later on graduated with a bachelor's degree from the Faculty of Journalism and Mass Communication at Thammasat University.

== Career ==
With his father being a folk singer in a university, his inclination for music started at an early age. He was able to develop this passion further when he went to the United States as an international exchange student where he became part of a choir club and took harmonizing classes. This made him realize that singing was his "destiny" and that he wanted to become a singer. He also became a fan of soul music which he describes as "powerful both emotionally and vocally."

This paved the way for him to audition in Academy Fantasia. After failing twice in the auditions, he was eager to keep auditioning until the competition's maximum age regulation. He eventually made it to the show's eighth season in 2011 where he became the winner. Aside from the ฿350,000 cash prize, he also received a condominium unit worth ฿6 million at that time.

He became part of True Fantasia until 2017 when he signed up with I Am Music. He is currently under the management of Musiccream since 2019.

He has also been active in the theater industry performing in musicals such as the "Baan Ruen Khieng Kan: Suntaraporn the Musical" and "Dreamgirls".

== Discography ==
Year	Song Title	Ref.
2011	"เธอมีเวลาฟังแค่ไหน" (Thoe Mi Wela Fang Khaenai)	
2012	"จักรวาล" (Chak Ra Wan)	
2012	"Com'on"	
2013	"โดยไม่มีเธอ" (Doi Mai Mi Thoe)	
2013	"คนไม่สำคัญ" (Khon Mai Samkhan)	
2014	"ไม่รู้สึก" (Mai Rusuek)	
2014	"ข้อความจากคนแปลกหน้า" (Khokhwam Chak Khonplaekna) ft. Kit from The Voice	
2015	"แค่เรา" (Khae Rao)	
2015	"รู้ยัง" (Ru Yang)	
2015	"ไม่บอกก็รู้ว่ารัก" (Mai Bok Ko Ru Wa Rak) ft. Piyatida Amphan (Jib)	
2015	"ชีวิตจริงไม่ใช่นิยาย" (Chiwit Ching Maichai Niyai)	
2015	"ด้วยรักของพ่อ" (Duai Rak Khong Pho) ft. Patcha Anek-ayuwat	
2017	"เธอผู้เดียว" (Thoe Phu Diao)	
2017	"เหมือนคนละฟากฟ้า" (Muean Khon La Fakfa)	
2017	"เปล๊า!" (Plao!)	
2017	"ด้วยชีวิตที่มี" (Duai Chiwit Thi Mi)	
2017	"คำตอบอยู่ที่หัวใจ" (Kam Tob You Tee Hua Jai)	
2018	"ปลดปล่อย" (Plot Ploi)	
2018	"ตราบชีวิตฉัน" (Trap Chiwit Chan)	
2019	"ความจริงแค่ในเมื่อวาน" (Khwan Ching Khae Nai Mueawan)	
2019	"รู้ยัง" (Ru Yang)	
2019	"อย่างเดิมได้ไหม" (Yang Doem Dai Mai)	
2019	"Truth Or Dare"	
2020	"Long Trip"	
