= Emo Gurram Egaravachu =

- Directed by: Chandra Siddhartha
- Written by: S. S. Kanchi
- Produced by: John Sudheer Pudhota
- Starring: Sumanth; Pinky Sawika Chaiyadech
- Cinematography: Chandramouli; Rajendra
- Edited by: Chandra Shekar G. V.
- Music by: M. M. Keeravani
- Production company: Cherry Films
- Release date: 25 January 2014
- Country: India
- Language: Telugu

Emo Gurram Egaravachu (transl. Who Knows, this horse may just fly) is a 2014 Telugu-language romantic comedy film directed by Chandra Siddhartha . It stars Sumanth and Pinky Sawika Chaiyadech. The latter made her debut in Telugu cinema through this film and it is Sumanth's second feature with Chandra Siddhartha after the 2007 film Madhumasam. S. S. Kanchi wrote the screenplay and M. M. Keeravani provided the soundtrack for this film. It released on 25 January 2014 to a sub par response at the box office. Sumanth's performance was however praised by critics. The film's title is based on a song from Rambantu (1996), which also had music by Keeravani.

== Cast ==
- Sumanth as Bullebbayi
- Sawika Chaiyadech as Neelaveni
- Harsha Vardhan as Prabhakar, Neelaveni's paternal uncle
- Raksha as Neelaveni's mother
- Ashmita Karnani as Neelaveni's aunt
- SS Kanchi as GD Naidu
- Tagubothu Ramesh as Ammiraju
- Sudha as Bullebbayi's mother
- Annapoorna as Bullebbayi's grandmother
- Pavala Syamala
- Sivannarayana Naripeddi

== Soundtrack ==
Emo Gurram Egaravachu

Soundtrack album by M. M. Keeravaani
- Released: 2013
- Recorded: 2013
- Genre: Feature film soundtrack
- Length: 19:42
- Label: Vel Records
- Producer: M. M. Keeravaani

M. M. Keeravaani chronology
Special 26 (2013)	Emo Gurram Egaravachu (2013)	Anaamika (2014)
External audio
- Official Audio Jukebox on YouTube

Music composed by M. M. Keeravaani. Music release released by Vel Records.

Track list
No.	Title	Lyrics	Singer(s)	Length
1.	"Neelavenini Yedipinchina Bullabbai"	Chaithanya Prasad	Rahul Sipligunj	03:31
2.	"Bharatam Pattina Naatyam"	Chaithanya Prasad	Rahul Sipligunj	03:42
3.	"Salahaalivvoddu"	Chaitanya Prasad	Prudhivi Chandra	02:47
4.	"Bull Boy.. What's Ur Problem.?"	Prudhivi Chandra, MM Keeravaani	Ramya Behara	02:39
5.	"Maid in India"	Chaithanya Prasad	Ramya Behara	03:03
6.	"Bullabbaayini Yedipinchina Neelaveni"	MM Keeravaani	L. V. Revanth	01:49
7.	"Yennisaarlaina"	MM Keeravaani	Ramya Behara, Yamini	01:31
8.	"Boorela Buttaloo Padda Gurram"	MM Keeravaani	Rahul Sipligunj, Prudhivi Chandra, Ramya Behara, Revanth, Yamini	01:00
Total length:				19:42

== Reception ==
A critic from The Times of India rated the film 3.5/5 stars and wrote, "Director Chandra Siddharth who has delivered sensible stuff in the past brings gives the subject the treatment it truly deserves". A critic from The Hans India rated the film 2.5/5 praising the film's director, music director and the lead pair's chemistry.
