= Markandeyan =

- Directed by: FEFSI Vijayan
- Written by: FEFSI Vijayan
- Produced by: FEFSI Vijayan
- Starring: Shabarish Vijayan; Savika Chaiyadej (Pinky); Nivedhitha; Santhanam
- Cinematography: D. Sasikumar; Santtonio
- Edited by: Raja Mohammad
- Music by: Sundar C Babu
- Production company: Mastermind Films
- Release date: 29 July 2011
- Country: India
- Language: Tamil

Markandeyan is a 2011 Indian Tamil-language film written and directed by FEFSI Vijayan. It stars his son Shabarish, Savika Chaiyadej (Pinky), Nivedhitha, and Santhanam in the lead roles. The film score is composed by Sundar C. Babu, cinematography by D. Sasikumar and Santtonio and editing by Raja Mohammed. Markandeyan was panned by critics.

== Cast ==
- Shabarish Vijayan as Markandeyan "Mark"
- Savika Chaiyadej (Pinky) as Divya
- Nivedhitha as Ilavanchi
- Santhanam as Yaanaimudi
- Srihari as Varada
- Bala Singh as Esakki
- Pragathi
- M. S. Bhaskar
- Nizhalgal Ravi
- Tarun Shatriya
- Vasu Vikram
- Appu K. Sami as Lawyer
- Periya Karuppu Thevar
- Karate Raja
- Muthukaalai
- Bava Lakshmanan
- Sumathi G. as Yaanaimudi's admirer
- Sree Raam as Young Mark

== Production ==
FEFSI Vijayan launched his son Shabarish with this film. Thai actress Savika Chaiyadej (Pinky) made her debut into Indian cinema with this film. Shabarish trained for a year in Thai boxing.

== Soundtrack ==
Songs by Sundar C. Babu. Salman Khan (who worked with FEFSI Vijayan in Wanted and Dabangg), Vijay, and Shriya Saran attended the audio launch.

Song title	Lyricist	Singers
"Vanji Kota"	Kavivarman	Manicka Vinayakam, Naveen Madhav
"Kanna Kati Kaathule"	S. Gnanakaravel	Velmurugan
"Paasam Indri"	Kavivarman	Senthildass Velayutham
"Yakka Chakka	Kavivarman	Krishna Iyer, Charulatha
"Siru Siru Vena"	Yugabharathi	MK. Balaji, Vichitha
"Panflute Theme"		Kiran
"Markandeyan"		Kiran

== Reception ==
A critic from The New Indian Express opined that "The director has painstakingly worked on the script in the earlier half and given it a fresh feel. However, he could have taken more effort in the second half and made it just as engaging". A critic from Sify gave the film a verdict of "disappointing" and criticised the film. A critic from Behindwoods gave the film a half out of five stars and wrote that "Technically, there is not much that deserves mention except for the effort of the crew to make the action sequences."
