= Prateep Kochabua =

Thai contemporary artist (born 1962)

- ประทีป คชบัว
- Born: April 13, 1962 (age 64); Bangkok, Thailand
- Education: Faculty of Fine Arts at Silpakorn University
- Known for: Contemporary art
- Awards: Silpathorn Award

Prateep Kochabua (Thai: ประทีป คชบัว; born 13 April 1962) is a Thai contemporary artist from Bangkok. He obtained a bachelor's degree in painting from the Faculty of Fine Arts at Silpakorn University and went on to work as an art director at an advertising agency from 1984 until 1992. Since becoming a professional artist, he has had numerous solo exhibitions, including at Thailand's National Gallery and River City Shopping Complex in Bangkok. His artwork is exhibited permanently at MOCA in Bangkok. He is a recipient of the Silpathorn Award.
