= China Dolls =

Thai pop duo

- Origin: Bangkok, Thailand
- Genres: Pop, dance
- Occupations: Singers, actresses, dancers
- Instrument: Vocals
- Years active: 1999–2005, 2008-2010, 2013–present
- Labels: GMM Grammy (1999–2005, 2013–present); Warner Music Taiwan (2008–2010)
- Members: Pailin "Hwa Hwa" Rattanasangsatian; Supachaya "Bell" Lattisophonkul
- Past members: Dan Chun

China Dolls

Chinese name
- Traditional Chinese: 中國娃娃
- Simplified Chinese: 中国娃娃
Transcriptions
Standard Mandarin
- Hanyu Pinyin: zhōng guó wá wá

Thai name
- Thai: ไชน่าดอลส์
- RTGS: chai na don

China Dolls (Thai: ไชน่าดอลส์; Chinese: 中国娃娃; Chinese: 中國娃娃) are a pop duo from Thailand. The group is composed of Pailin "Hwa Hwa" Rattanasangsatian and Supachaya "Bell" Lattisophonkul.

== Career ==
The duo has released several albums since their formation in 1999 and performed at the Asia 2000 Music Festival. China Dolls are known for their song "Muay nee kah" (Thai: หมวยนี่คะ, I Am a China Girl), which was later translated to Mandarin as "单眼皮女生" (pinyin: dānyǎnpí nǚshēng, Girls with Single Eyelids). They perform songs in both Thai language and Mandarin, which sometimes confuses Thai fans, but this has made the group popular in Taiwan as well as with Mandarin-speaking fans in Malaysia, Singapore and China. They also wrote and published "Heng Heng Heng" (Thai: เฮง เฮง เฮง), the eponymous theme song for the television series Heng Heng Heng.

After a few years without a new CD under the China Dolls name, and with the duo disbanding in 2006, Hwa Hwa began looking for a new partner since Bell has been working with her Dance School. Hwa Hwa and new partner Dan Chun released a new album on the Warner Music Taiwan label in 2010.

As of 2013, Bell and Hwa Hwa rejoined together as China Dolls and attended the Grammy Happy Face-Tival Reunion Concert under their Thai Label, GMM Grammy.

In 2021, they released "NIHAO NIHAO", their first single in over 6 years.

== Personal life ==
On February 23, 2013, Bell happily married her now husband. Her co-stars from Ratree-Brazia attended the wedding along with Hwa Hwa as bridesmaids.

== Members ==
=== Hwa Hwa ===
- Birth Name: Pailin Rattanasangsatian (Thai: ไพลิน รัตนแสงเสถียร)
- Chinese Name: Chinese: 陈冠桦; pinyin: Chén Guānhuà; Chinese: 陳冠樺
- Birth Date: June 12, 1979
- Languages: Thai, Chinese, English

=== Bell ===
- Birth Name: Supachaya Lattisophonkul (Thai: สุภัชญา ลัทธิโสภณกุล)
- Chinese Name: Chinese: 李小燕; pinyin: Lǐ Xiǎoyàn; Chinese: 李曉燕
- Birth Date: April 17, 1981
- Languages: Thai, Chinese, English

== Discography ==
=== Studio albums ===
==== Thai studio albums ====
Information	Track listing
หมวยนี่คะ (Muay Nee Kah) [I Am Chinese Girl]: Format: CD, VCD; Released: July 15, 1999; Label: GMM Grammy	1. "หมวยนี่คะ (Muay Nee Kah) [I Am Chinese Girl]"; 2. "ตี๋ไม่เกี่ยว (Tee Mai Gure) [You're Not Chinese Boy]"; 3. "หว่อ อ้าย หนี่ (Wau Ai Nee) [I Love You]"; 4. "อย่านะ (Yah Na) [Don't]"; 5. "Happy Little Eye"; 6. "ล้อเล่น (Lau Len) [Joke]"; 7. "Decibel"; 8. "คิดถึง (Kid Teung) [Miss You]"; 9. "Thaina Dance"; 10. "You Wanna Dance"; 11. "ใครคนหนึ่ง (Krai Kon Neung) [Someone]"; 12. "หมวยตุ่ย (Muay Tui) [Chubby Chinese Girls] (V. Encore Mix)"
China More: Format: CD, VCD; Released: December 15, 2000; Label: GMM Grammy	1. "โอ๊ะ โอ๊ะ โอ๊ะ (Oh Oh Oh)"; 2. "H.N.Y."; 3. "คนหน้า ม. (Kon Nah More) [Next Person]"; 4. "มากไป ป่าว? (Mark Pai Pow?) [Claim Too Much?]"; 5. "ไม่สำคัญ (Mai Sum Kun) [Not Important]"; 6. "ตี๋ไม่อยู่ (Tee Mai Yoo) [Absent Chinese Boy]"; 7. "และ...คิดถึง (Lae...Kid Teung) [And...Miss You]"; 8. "น้อย น้อย หน่อย (Noy Noy Noy) [A Little Bit]"; 9. "เพลงหมาหมา (Pleng Mah Mah) [The Dog Song]"; 10. "หนี่ ไท้ เสี่ยว (Nee Tai Seeow) [You're Small]"; 11. "โอ๊ะ โอ๊ะ ตึ๊บ (Oh Oh Tub)"; 12. "มันส์หน้า ม. (Mun Nah More) [Next Enjoy]"
ติ้งหน่อง (Ting Nong): Format: CD, VCD; Released: August 21, 2001; Label: GMM Grammy	1. "Intro"; 2. "ติ้งหน่อง (Ting Nong); 3. "ชักดิ้น ชักงอ (Chuk Din Chuk Ngau) [Wriggle & Bend]; 4. "เป็นคนไทย (Pen Kon Tai) [Be Like Thai]; 5. "ไม่ซึ้ง (Mai Seung) [No Impression]; 6. "ต้มยำ (Tom Yum); 7. "So Sad"; 8. "คู่กัด (Koo Kud) [Rival]; 9. "ซอย 4 (Soy 4) [Road 4]; 10. "ฝากเลี้ยง (Fark Leang) [Foster Care]; 11. "That's the Way (I Like It)"; 12. "ตึ๊งหนึบ (Thai Kou)"
China แดง (China Daeng): Format: CD; Released: August 6, 2002; Label: GMM Grammy	1. Wa-O-Wa; 2. ตี๋ช้ง (Tee Sung) [Chinese Boy]; 3. นางฟ้าหน้าหมวย (Naang Far Nah Muay) [Become Chinese Woman]; 4. กระดึ๊บ กระดึ๊บ (Gra Deub Gra Deub) [Creepy Creepy]; 5. Dui bu gi Miss Call; 6. เช็ค DNA (Check DNA); 7. เธอมาช้า (Tur Ma Cha) [You're Late]; 8. หมวยนะไม่ได้โจ๋ (Muay Na Mai Dai Joh) [Chinese Girls Aren't Teens Anymore]; 9. ยิ้มมายิ้มไป (Yim Ma Yim Pai) [Smile Or Not]; 10. ซื่อ-ปู้-OK (Seueh-Poo-OK) [Yes No OK]
B/W: Format: CD, VCD; Released: April 23, 2004; Label: GMM Grammy	1. "เฮ้ย...มันดี (Hureh...Mun Dee) [Hey... It's Good]"; 2. "เขาไม่รัก (Kow Mai Ruk) [He Doesn't Love]"; 3. "รักสะกิดใจ (Ruk Sa Kid Jai) [Be Careful Of Love]"; 4. "ไม่ได้ลืมหรอกนะ (Mai Dai Leum Rok Na) [Can't Forget You]"; 5. "วันอาทิตย์ (Wun Ah Tit) [Sunday] - featuring 'Pex' Zeal"; 6. "หูดำ (Hoo Dum) [Black Ear]- featuring B-King"; 7. "ผู้หญิงคนนั้น...ทีฉันไม่เคยได้เป็น (Poo Ying Kon Nun...Tee Chun Mai Koey Dai Pen) [That Woman... Can't Go Back]"; 8. "จืด (Jued) [Bland]"; 9. "เขาไม่รัก (Kow mai ruk) [He doesn't love me]" 10. "แล้วจะบอก (Leaw Ja Bauk) [I'll Tell You Then]"; 11. "เพ้อ (Pur) [Crazily]"; 12. "Outro"

==== Chinese studio albums ====
Information	Track listing
單眼皮女生: Format: CD; Released: March 2000; Label: GMM Grammy	1. "單眼皮女生" (หมวยนี่ค่ะ [Chinese ver.]); 2. "蚊子愛情進行曲" (ตี๋ไม่เกี่ยว [Chinese ver.]); 3. "我愛你" [Chinese ver.]; 4. "雅麗的男朋友" (อย่านะ [Chinese ver.]); 5. "求愛響尾蛇" (Decibel [Chinese ver.]); 6. "哥哥妹妹採茶歌" (ล้อเล่น [Chinese ver.]); 7. "啊!Happy Little Eye" [Chinese ver.]; 8. "大姐大" (คิดถึงบ้างนะ [Chinese ver.]); 9. "Party女王" (Thaina Dance [Chinese ver.]); 10. "我演的是我" (ใครคนหนึ่ง [Chinese ver.])
賀歳喔!喔!喔!: Format: CD; Released: January 2001; Label: GMM Grammy	1. "發財發福中國年" (H.N.Y. [Chinese ver.]); 2. "我不想想你" (โอ๊ะ โอ๊ะ โอ๊ะ [Chinese ver.]); 3. "狗臉 (คนหน้า ม.)"; 4. "弟弟不在(ตี๋ไม่อยู่ [Chinese ver.])" 5. "少來了 (น้อย น้อย หน่อย [Chinese ver.])" 6. "狗歌 (เพลงหมาหมา)"; 7. "Oh! Oh! Oh!"; 8. "新年快樂 (H.N.Y.)"; 9. "你太小 (หนี่ ไท้ เสี่ยว)"; 10. "泰國人 (มันส์หน้า ม.)"; 11. "Oh! Oh! Oh! (Remix) (โอ๊ะ โอ๊ะ ตึ๊บ)"; 12. "雅麗的男朋友 (Remix)" (อย่านะ (Remix)[Chinese ver.])
我愛太空人: Format: CD; Released: March 2001; Label: GMM Grammy	1. "不要你的禮物" (ไม่สำคัญ [Chinese ver.]); 2. "我沒有那麼笨" (มากไป ป่าว? [Chinese ver.]); 3. "弟弟不在" (ตี๋ไม่อยู่ [Chinese ver.]); 4. "我愛太空人" (และ...คิดถึง [Chinese ver.]); 5. "路邊的野花不要採" (Teresa Teng cover); 6. "害羞的男孩"; 7. "良心與現金"; 8. "外星情話" (บุษบา [Chinese ver.]) (Nicole Theriault cover); 9. "叫你不要你就要"; 10. "我該怎麼辦" (ใต้แสงตะวัน [Chinese ver.]) (Nicole Theriault cover)
環遊世界Ding Ding Dong: Format: CD; Released: October 12, 2001; Label: GMM/8866 (Taiwan), GMM/Avex Asia (Hong Kong)	1. "Boom" [Chinese ver. feat. Dragon 5]; 2. "環遊世界Ding Ding Dong" (ติ้งหน่อง [Chinese ver.]); 3. "酸辣湯" (ต้มยำ [Chinese ver.]); 4. "受不了" (So Sad [Chinese ver.]); 5. "遲到" (Liu Wen-cheng cover); 6. "少來了" (น้อย น้อย หน่อย [Chinese ver.]); 7. "忠孝東路" (ซอย 4 [Chinese ver.]); 8. "Weed Boom" [Boom Remix Chinese ver.]; 9. "暗戀我" (เป็นคนไทย [Chinese ver.]); 10. "亂七八糟" (ชักดิ้น ชักงอ [Chinese ver.]); 11. "寄養 (ฝากเลี้ยง)" (J Jetrin cover); 12. "晚安" (ไม่ซึ้ง [Chinese ver.])
加多一點點: Format: CD; Released: January 2002; Label: GMM/8866 (Taiwan), GMM/Avex Asia (Hong Kong)	1. "加多一點點" (Yun Liu cover); 2. "家家有本難唸的經" (Poon Sow Keng cover); 3. "西子姑娘" (Zhou Xuan cover); 4. "La La La"; 5. "Happy Party"; 6. "女兒國" (Poon Sow Keng cover); 7. "海神 (จ้าวสมุทร)"; 8. "Genie Jah" (2002 Rahtree); 9. "Do Re Mi" (2002 Rahtree); 10. "天涯歌女" (Zhou Xuan cover); 11. "12 Festive Chinese New Year Songs Non-stop Medley"
亮晶晶: Format: CD; Released: September 28, 2010; Label: Warner Music Taiwan	1. "亮晶晶"; 2. "你是我的大明星"; 3. "Happy Day"; 4. "愛誠則靈"; 5. "愛降落"; 6. "食在東方"; 7. "寶貝對不起"; 8. "想愛你"; 9. "喔喔"; 10. "小媳婦回娘家"

=== Extended plays ===
Information	Track listing
BLING！ BLING！百靈百利: Format: CD; Released: February 4, 2010; Label: Warner Music Taiwan	1. "愛降落"; 2. "回娘家"; 3. "Oh! Oh!"

=== Compilation albums ===
Information	Track listing
萬歲萬歲萬萬歲: Format: CD; Released: August 9, 2002; Label: GMM/8866 (Taiwan), GMM/Avex Asia (Hong Kong)	1. "萬歲萬歲萬萬歲"; 2. "蜘蛛人陷入情網"; 3. "單眼皮女生" (หมวยนี่ค่ะ [Chinese ver.]); 4. "酸辣湯" (ต้มยำ [Chinese ver.]); 5. "我不想想你" (Oh! Oh! Oh! [Chinese ver.]); 6. "我是蛋"; 7. "環遊世界Ding Ding Dong" (ติ้งหน่อง [Chinese ver.]); 8. "不要你的禮物" (ไม่สำคัญ [Chinese ver.]); 9. "Boom" [Chinese ver. feat. Dragon 5]; 10. "蚊子進行曲" (ตี๋ไม่เกี่ยว [Chinese ver.]); 11. "路邊野花不要採"; 12. "我沒有那麼笨"; 13. "哥哥妹妹採茶歌" (ล้อเล่น [Chinese ver.]); 14. "多加一點點" (Yun Liu cover); 15. "家家有本難唸的經" (Poon Sow Keng cover); 16. "我愛你" [Chinese ver.]; Non-stop Dance Remix: 1. "Boom (Remix)"; 2. "環遊世界Ding Ding Dong (Remix)"; 3. "單眼皮女生 (Remix)"; 4. "我不想想你 (Remix)"; 5. "哥哥妹妹採茶歌 (Remix)"; 6. "不要你的禮物 (Remix)"; 7. "少來了 (Remix)"; 8. "我沒有那麼笨 (Remix)"; 9. "蚊子進行曲 (Remix)"; 10. "酸辣湯 (Remix)"

=== Remix albums ===
Information	Track listing
無敵Remix: Format: CD; Released: May 2000; Label: GMM Grammy	1. "丹鳳眼 (單眼皮女生泰語版Remix)"; 2. "哥哥妹妹採茶歌 (國語版Remix)"; 3. "Silly Boy (單眼皮女生英語版Remix)"; 4. "我愛你 (泰語版Remix)"; 5. "賭臭我的愛(單眼皮女生台語版Remix)"
China Dance: Format: CD; Released: August 24, 2004; Label: GMM Grammy	1. "หมวยนี่คะ (Muay Nee Ka)"; 2. "ล้อเล่น (Lor Len)"; 3. "ตี๋ไม่เกี่ยว (Tee mai kiew)" 4. "โอ๊ะ โอ๊ะ โอ๊ะ (Oh Oh Oh)"; 5. "คนหน้า ม. (Khon Nah Mor)"; 6. "H.N.Y."; 7. "หนี่ ไท้ เสี่ยว (Nee Tai Siew)"; 8. "ติ้งหน่อง (Ting Nong)"; 9. "เป็นคนไทย (Pen Khon Thai)"; 10. "Wa-O-Wa"; 11. "ตี๋ซัง (Tee Chung)"; 12. "เขาไม่รัก (Kao Mai Ruk); 13. "ผู้หญิงคนนั้น...ที่ฉันไม่เคยได้ฝัน (Poo Ying Khon Nun...Tee Chun Mai Kei Dai Fhun); 14. "เขาไม่รัก (Kao mai ruk) (Hip Hop Mix) (Bonus track)"

=== Special projects ===
- China Guan (January 2000) - a collaborative project with Samapon Piyapongsiri
- Cheer (2001) - an agency-wide project featuring collaborative songs and remixes by the participating artists.
- 2002 Ratree (December 2001) - a joint project group that released an original album with Katreeya English, Yayaying, and Jennifer Politanont.
- Cover Girls (June 2003) - an album containing international (mostly English) cover songs by female artists under GMM Grammy.
- 2005 Tiwa Hula Hula (June 2005) - another original album containing the same lineup as 2002 Rahtree.
- 10th Anniversary of Grammy Gold (July 2005) - featured in the 1st project album performing a cover of รองูเข้าฝัน by then-labelmate Duangjan Suwanee.
- 2007 Show Girls (November 2006) - an album containing Thai original and cover songs featuring the same lineup as 2002 Rahtree (excluding Hwa Hwa).
- Brazia (December 2009) - an album containing international cover songs, also featuring the same lineup as 2002 Rahtree (excluding Hwa Hwa and Katreeya)

=== Digital Single ===
- Nihao Nihao (2021)
- SisterSister (feat. K.R.BROS) [2024]
- So Hot (K.R.BROS feat. China Dolls) [2024]
- You & Me (2026)

== Awards ==
- Nominee "The Best Group Singer" of Golden Melody Award 12th, Taiwan (May 2001)
- Winning Award of "Top Ten Golden Melody (Dan yan pi nü sheng)" of Singapore Golden Melody Award (2001)
- Winning Award of "Top Ten Hits (Dan yan pi nü sheng)" of Chinese Music Award, Genting, Malaysia (2001.Nov)
- Winning Award of "Top Ten Hits (Bu yao ni de li wu)" of Chinese Music Award at Genting, Malaysia (2001.Nov)
- Winning Bronze Award of "The Best Group Singer" Golden Melody Award 1st, Malaysia (November 2001)
- Winning "The Best Group Singer", Vietnam (2001)
- Winning "The Best Group Singer" 2nd, Vietnam (2002)
- Winning Award of "Top Ten Hits" ( OH OH OH), Vietnam (2001)
- Winning Award of "Top Ten Hits" ( OH OH OH 2nd ), Vietnam (2002)
- Winning Award of "Top Ten Hits" ( KON NAH MAW), Vietnam (2002)
- Winning Award of "Top Ten Hits" ( TING NONG), Vietnam (2002)
- Nominee "The Best Group Singer" of Golden Melody Award 2nd, Malaysia (November 2002)
- Winning Award of "Best Group Singer" of Chinese music award, Malaysia
- Awards of "Best Youth" from Government of Thailand, Thailand (2004)
- Award for Fighting Drug Abuse, Thailand (2003, 2004)
- Award for Fighting Gambling, Thailand (2004)
- Award for Participating in Blood Donation, Thailand (2004)
- Virgin Hitz 40 Award—Kao Mai Ruk, Thailand (2004)
- No.3 The best group singer-vote on internet, Taiwan (2006)
- "Volunteer artist", Thailand (2015)

== Filmography ==
- Fong Yun - Wind and Cloud (Serial idol drama), Taiwan (2002)
- The Games (TV Show), Thailand (October 2004)
- RU JING PA (TV Show) (March 2007)
- Pu Kong Jao Sa Neh (Comedy); Hwa Hwa Only (2007)

== Other works ==
=== Magazines ===
- YOU, Singapore
- Đất mũi, Vietnam (2002)
- I-weekly, Singapore
- Naruhodo the Taiwan, Taiwan and Japan (2002.May)
- Billboard 23 Nov 2002
- Her World, Thailand (2004.Sep)
- Seventeen, Thailand (2004.Oct)
- "FHM", Singapore (Only Hwahwa China dolls)
- "ZOO", Thailand (Only Hwahwa China dolls)
- OK Magazine, Thailand (2007.Feb) Features Hwa Hwa and her dog Hermes only

..etc..

=== Advertising ===
- Coca-Cola, Thailand (2001)
- Hang Ten, Taiwan and East Asia (2001.Jun-Sep)
- Motorola T191, Thailand and Singapore (2002)

=== Other appearances ===
- Host of "Miracle Mars" Press conference, Interview with Vic F4, Big S, etc., Thailand (October 20, 2004)
- Garnier Event, Bangkok Thailand (October 2007)
- Judges for dance contest, Thailand (2015–present)
