= Siamese Kat =

Studio album by Katreeya English
- Released: May 2003 (Thailand)
- Genre: T-pop; dance-pop; techno
- Language: Thai
- Label: GMM Grammy

Katreeya English chronology
Kat around the clock (2001)	Siamese Kat (2003)	Lucky Girl (2005)

Siamese Kat is the second studio album by Thai pop singer Katreeya English, released by GMM Grammy in May 2003.

== Track listing ==
1. "Meaw meaw" : เหมียว เหมียว
2. "Seven days"
3. "Kon kong muer wann" : คนของเมื่อวาน
4. "Na na na wah gun pai" : นา นา นา ว่ากันไป
5. "Rao mai kei plien" : เราไม่เคยเปลี่ยน
6. "Noy noi" : น้อยหน่อย
7. "Mai chai...plor tur" : ไม่ใช่...เพราะเธอ
8. "Boob pay ar ra wad" : บุพเพอาละวาด
9. "Tong karn ruk tae" : ต้องการรักแท้
10. "Bye bye" (cover version)
11. "Kid tueng luer ngao jai" : คิดถึงหรือเหงาใจ
12. "Meaw meaw" (minus one)
