= Chart Korbjitti =

Thai writer

- ชาติ กอบจิตติ
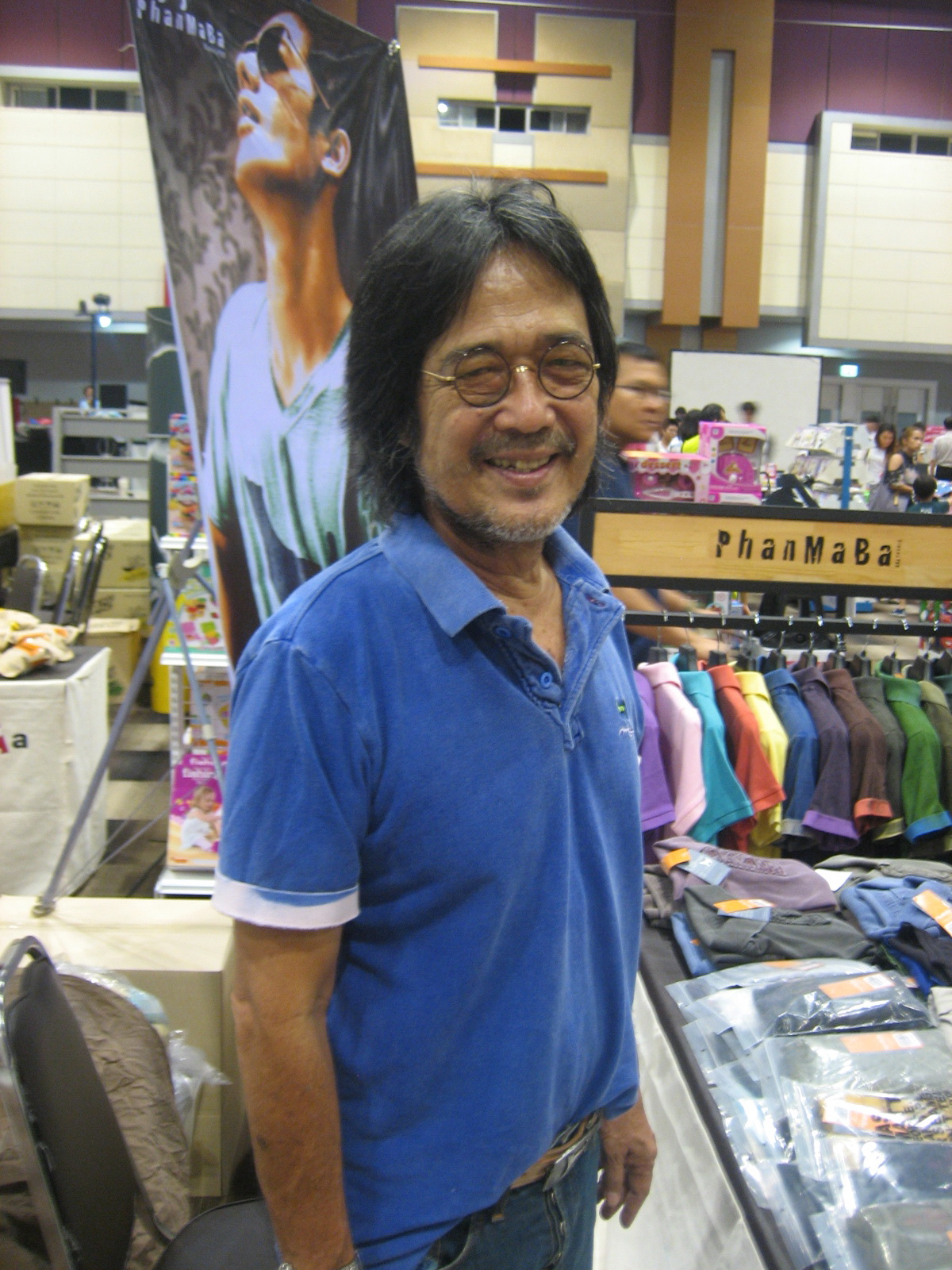
- Born: 25 June 1954 (age 72); Samut Sakhon Province, Thailand
- Occupation: Writer

Chart Korbjitti (Thai: ชาติ กอบจิตติ; RTGS: Chat Kopchitti; born 25 June 1954) is a Thai writer.

He first came to prominence with the publication of his novel Khamphiphaksa (The Judgment) in 1981. Named as Book of the Year by Thailand's Literature Council, the book won him the S.E.A. Write Award. He received a second S.E.A. Write Award in 1994 for Wela (Time). He was named a National Artist in Literature in 2004, and was among the honorees of the inaugural Silpathorn Award, given to Thai contemporary artists.

== Biography ==
Chart was born in the Khlong Sunak Hon area of Samut Sakhon province. In 1969, at the age of 15, he published his first short story, Nak Rian Nak Leng, in a school publication at Wat Pathum Khong Kha School.

His story Phu Phae won the Cho Karaket short story award in 1979 from Lok Nangsue magazine.

He has established himself as a full-time writer, stating, "I choose to be a writer. I give it my whole life. I have traded my whole life for it."

He has founded the publishing house Samnakphim Hon (Howling Books), which publishes all of his work.

== Work ==
Chart's books, in order of original publication date:

- Thang Chana (ทางชนะ; 1979) novella, ISBN 974-90552-9-2
- Chon Trok (จนตรอก; 1980), novella, ISBN 974-90565-9-0
  - Published in English in 2003 as No Way Out, ISBN 974-91385-1-1
- Khamphiphaksa (คำพิพากษา; 1981), novel, ISBN 974-91957-9-5
  - Published in English in 1995 as The Judgment, ISBN 974-89330-0-8
- Rueang Thamada (เรื่องธรรมดา; 1983), novella, ISBN 974-93281-4-0
  - Published in English in 2010 as An Ordinary Story, ISBN 978-616-90474-2-1
- Mit Pracham Tua (มีดประจำตัว; 1984), collected short stories 1, ISBN 974-93957-4-3
- Ma Nao Loi Nam (หมาเน่าลอยน้ำ; 1987), novella, ISBN 974-211-079-4
- Phan Ma Ba (พันธุ์หมาบ้า; 1988), novel, ISBN 974-92246-3-9
  - Published in English in 2002 as Mad Dogs & Co., ISBN 974-90553-5-7
- Nakhon Mai Pen Rai (นครไม่เป็นไร; 1989), collected short stories 2, ISBN 974-90553-2-2
- Wela (เวลา; 1993), novel, ISBN 974-90566-1-2
  - Published in English in 2000 as Time, ISBN 974-85827-7-9
- Banthuek: Banthuek Rueang Rao Rai Sara Khong Chiwit (บันทึก: บันทึกเรื่องราวไร้สาระของชีวิต; 1996), essays, ISBN 974-93095-7-X
- Raingan Thueng Phanathan Nayok Ratthamontri (รายงานถึง ฯพณฯ นายกรัฐมนตรี; 1996), novella, ISBN 974-90553-1-4
- Lom Long (ลมหลง; 2000), screenplay, ISBN 974-211-107-3
- Ple Yuan Tai Ton Nun (เปลญวนใต้ต้นนุ่น; 2003), collected articles from Si San magazine 1999-2003, ISBN 974-91640-9-1
- Borikan Rap Nuat Na (บริการรับนวดหน้า; 2005), collected short stories 3, ISBN 974-92921-0-3
- Lorm Wong Khui (ล้อมวงคุย; 2008), collected articles from Si San magazine 2005-2007, ISBN 978-974-05-0932-5

== Adaptations ==
- Khamphiphaksa was made into a Thai film called Ai-Fak in 2004.
