= Jan Dara the Beginning =

- Directed by: Bhandevanov Devakula
- Based on: Jan Dara by Utsana Phleungtham
- Produced by: Somsak Tejcharattanaprasert
- Starring: Mario Maurer; Bongkot Kongmalai
- Distributed by: Sahamongkol International
- Release date: 20 September 2012
- Country: Thailand
- Language: Thai

Jan Dara the Beginning is a 2012 Thai erotic-period-drama film that is based on a novel by Pramool Unhathoop, The Story of Jan Dara.

== Plot ==
Based on a famous Thai erotic novel, the film tells the story of Jan, a boy who grows up in a house lorded over by his sadistic and debauched father, Luang Wisnan. Set in the 1930s the story recounts the growing pains of Jan, whose mother dies while giving birth to him and who's intensely hated by his father. Jan grows up with Aunt Wad, his stepmother, and he struggles to reconcile his guilt and longing with different women in his life, including a girl called Hyacinth, whom he adores, and later Madame Boonleung, his father's lover who becomes a key to Jan's sexual awakening.

== Cast ==
- Mario Maurer - Jan Dara
- Sakarat Ritthumrong - Luang Vissanun-decha (Jan Dara's Father)
- Bongkot Kongmalai - Aunt Waad
- Sawika Chaiyadech - Hi-sinh / Dara (Jan Dara's Mother)
- Rhatha Phongam - Boonlueang
- Chaiyapol Julien Poupart - Ken Krating-thong
- Nishino Shō - Khun Kaew
- Nutt Devahastin - Khun Ka-jorn

== See also ==
- Jan Dara: The Finale
