= Katreeya English =

Thai actress and singer (born 1976)

- แคทรียา อิงลิช
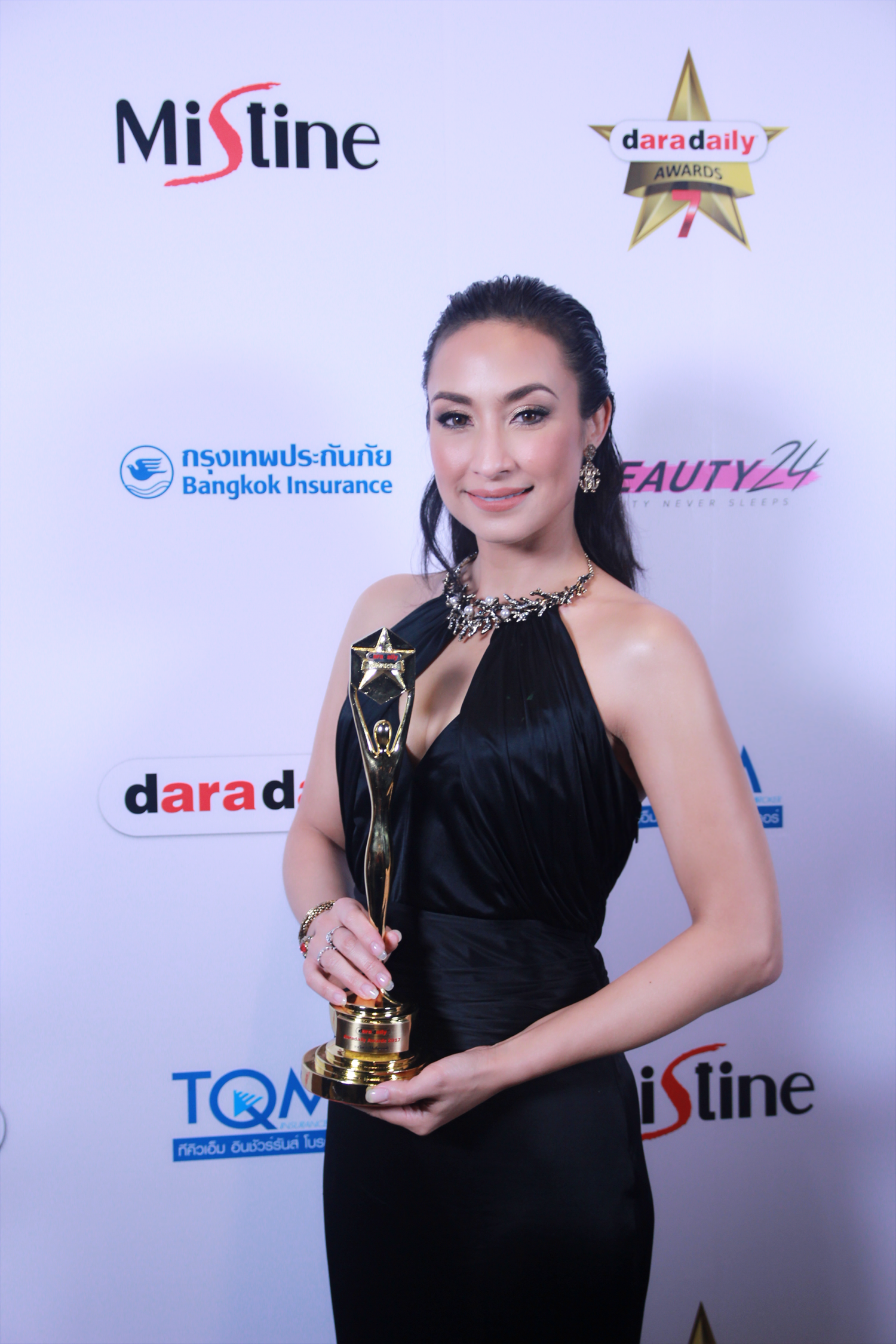
- English at Dara Daily Awards in 2019
- Born: 4 September 1976 (age 49); Oxford, England, United Kingdom
- Other name: Kat
- Education: Assumption University
- Occupations: Actress; model; singer; television presenter; MC
- Years active: 1990–present
- Height: 1.63 m (5 ft 4 in)
- Musical career
- Genres: Dance; pop; R&B
- Instrument: Vocals
- Label: GMM Grammy

Katreeya English (Thai: แคทรียา อิงลิช; born 4 September 1976) is a Thai singer, actress, and model. She has released five studio albums, including Sassy K on GMM Grammy. In 2015, she released the single "They Call Us the Royals", a new song for Reading F.C. of the Football League Championship.

== Early life and education ==
English was born to an English father and a Thai mother in Oxford, United Kingdom. She received a Bachelor of Arts majoring in English from Assumption University in Thailand.

== Discography ==
=== Studio albums ===
| Year | Album title | Notes | Ref. |
|---|---|---|---|
| 2001 | Kat Around the Clock | This album has sold over 900,000 copies. | |
| 2003 | Siamese Kat | | |
| 2005 | Lucky Girl | | |
| 2007 | Sassy K | | |

=== Other albums ===
| Year | Album title | Notes | Ref. |
|---|---|---|---|
| 1994 | Kiddy Kat | Soundtrack album for "Kiddy Kat" TV program | |
| 2001 | Mos Kat | Collaborative album with Mos Patiparn | |
| 2001 | Cheer (group) | | |
| 2002 | 2002 Ratree | Group composed of China Dolls, YaYa Ying and Jennifer Politanon | |
| 2002 | Choot Rub Kak | Collaboration with Thongchai McIntyre) | |
| 2003 | Fan Jaa Sanit Gun Laow Jaa | Collaboration with Thongchai McIntyre | |
| 2005 | Ruk Bussaba | Soundtrack album | |
| 2005 | Tiwa Hula Hula (group) | | |
| 2006 | Perd Floor | Collaboration with Thongchai McIntyre | |
| 2007 | Show Girls (group) | | |
| 2014 | Sao Noi Cafe | Soundtrack EP | |
| 2017 | Na Kin | Soundtrack single | |
| 2018 | Ra Bam Maan | Soundtrack single with Tong Pukkaramai | |
| 2021 | Girl2K | Soundtrack single | |

== Filmography ==
=== Films ===
Films
| Year | Title | Role | Notes | Ref. |
|---|---|---|---|---|
| 1992 | Anueng Khitthueng Pho Sangkhep อนึ่งคิดถึงพอสังเขป | | Five Stars Production | |
| 1992 | Cherm Cherm Leaw Kor Cham เฉิ่มแล้วก็ฉ่ำ | | | |
| 2007 | Shrek 3 | Princess Fiona | Thai dubbing | |
| 2008 | Kung Fu Panda | Master Tigress | Thai dubbing | |
| 2010 | Shrek 4 | Princess Fiona | Thai dubbing | |
| 2011 | Kung Fu Panda 2 | Master Tigress | Thai dubbing | |
| 2016 | Kung Fu Panda 3 | Master Tigress | Thai dubbing | |

=== Television series ===
Television Series
| Year | Title | Role | Network | Ref. |
|---|---|---|---|---|
| 1993 | Khun Ying Jom Kaen | Lady Kantima | Channel 3 | |
| 1994 | Nam Sai Jai Jing | Cream | Channel 7 | |
| 1994 | Kaw Pluek | Kasatha | Channel 7 | |
| 1995 | Sakawduen | Sakawduen | Channel 3 | |
| 1997 | Kemarin Intira | Intira | Channel 5 | |
| 1997 | Salakjid | Salakjid | Channel 3 | |
| 1997 | Sao Sai Hi-tech | Reung-Rin | Channel 3 | |
| 1997 | My Love, Katreeya | Charlette | Channel 3 | |
| 1998 | Ruam Ngan Rak | | Channel 3 | |
| 1998 | Nang Bap | Lai Thong | Channel 7 | |
| 1999 | Wimarn Mekkala (Paradise Land) | Mekkala | Channel 7 | |
| 1999 | Pungnee Chan Ja Rak Khun (Tomorrow, I'll Love You) | Ni-aorn | Channel 7 | |
| 2001 | Kon Song Kom | Nattamon | Channel 5 | |
| 2002 | Sao Noy Nai Takeangkeaw (Genie in a Bottle) | Genie / Jintana | Channel 7 | |
| 2005 | Budtsaba Krab Phom (Lady's Boy) | Budtsaba | Channel 3 | |
| 2005 | Lei Rai Ubai Ruk (Tricks of Love) | Parissa | Channel 7 | |
| 2010 | Fad Na Ya (Twins) | Pang / Prang | Channel 3 | |
| 2011 | Duang-Ta Sawarn (Heaven's Eyes) | Pan Dunna | Channel 3 | |
| 2013 | My Melody 360 Ong Saa | Maree | MCOT | |
| 2015 | 2 Rak 2 Win Yaan | Ratchanee | One 31 | |
| 2016 | Sao Noi Cafe | Kwan Jai | PPTV | |
| 2016 | AF 12 The Series | Jane | True4U | |
| 2017 | Plerng Rai Fai Marn | Ponpajee | Channel 8 | |
| 2018 | The Gifted | Ladda Ngamkul | One 31 | |
| 2018 | Rabam Maan | Chalita | Channel 7 | |
| 2018 | Club Friday The Series 10: Rak Rai | Lew | GMM25 | |
| 2019 | Samee See Thong | Nira | Amarin TV | |
| 2020 | Ruen Sai Sawart | Khun Ying Tarpthip | Channel 8 | |
| 2020 | Saneha Stories 3: Bar Host | Jae Nok | AIS PLAY | |
| 2020 | Plerng Phariya | Sriprapai | Channel 8 | |
| 2020 | Reuan Sai Sa Wat | Tabtip | Channel 8 | |
| 2020 | Wake Up Ladies: Very Complicated | Miriam | GMM 25 | |
| 2021 | Wayra Akart | Pleum | Channel 8 | |
| 2022 | Rohng Ngaan Ban-Ju Rak | Kwang | Workpoint | |
| 2022 | Sai Roong | Waewphan | One 31 | |
| 2023 | Soi Nakee | Ang-Gaap Wongsaroj (Gaap) | Channel 7 | |
| 2023 | You're My Universe / Rak Sood Jai Yai Tua Saeb | Rasee | Channel 3 | |
| TBA | Nam Pueng Kom | Rose | Channel 3 | |

=== Theater ===
Theater
| Year | Title | Notes | Ref. |
|---|---|---|---|
| 2013 | The Aerialist ลางลิง | ราชนิกร แก้วดี | |
| 2015 | โรมิโอกะอีเรียม อุบัติเหตุรักสลับขั้ว | With Arnuttaphol Sirichomsaeng & Methus Treerattanawareesin | |
| 2016 | ก๊วนคานทอง Love Game The Musical | With Chatayodom Hiranyatithi | |

== Hosting ==
Television

- 1994 : คิดดี้แคท On Air Ch.9 (1994-1998)
- 2013 : Ching Roi Ching Lan SUNSHINE DAY On Air Ch.3 with Phanya Nirunkul (Cameo)
- 2022 : The Ladies ผู้หญิงแถวหน้า On Air Mono 29 together with น้ำหวาน-พิมรา เจริญภักดี, น้ำ-ชลนที อักษรสิงห์ชัย (February 19, 2022 – present)
