= Jan Dara: The Finale =

Jan Dara the Finale
- Film poster
- Directed by: M.L. Pundhevanop Dhewakul
- Based on: Jan Dara by Utsana Phleungtham
- Produced by: Somsak Techaratanaprasert
- Starring: Mario Maurer; Bongkot Kongmalai
- Distributed by: Sahamongkol Film International
- Release date: 7 February 2013
- Country: Thailand
- Language: Thai

Jan Dara: The Finale or Jan Dara Patchimmabot is a 2013 Thai erotic-drama film directed by M.L Pundhevanop Dhewakul, and starring Mario Maurer and Bongkot Kongmalai. The movie is a sequel to Jan Dara the Beginning which was released back in 2012. The film was released on February 7, 2013 and was distributed by Sahamongkol Film International.

== Cast ==
- Mario Maurer as Jan Dara
- Sakarat Ritthumrong as Luang Vissanun-decha (Jan Dara's Father)
- Bongkot Kongmalai as Aunt Waad
- Rhatha Phongam as Boonlueang
- Chaiyapol Julian Pupart as Ken Krating-thong
- Sho Nishino as Khun Kaew
- Nutt Devahastin as Khun Ka-jorn
- Pongsiree Bunluewong as Capt. Danai
