= Red Eagle (novel) =

- The Red Eagle series character
- 200px Mitr Chaibancha in the role of Red Eagle in the film The Gangster King (1959)
- First appearance: The novel "The Red Eagle" (1955)
- Last appearance: Television drama Red Eagle (2019)
- Created by: Sek Dusit (Rerngchai Praphasanon)
- Portrayed by: Mitr Chaibancha (1959–1970); Singha Suriyong (1977); Krung Sriwilai (1980); Ruangsak Loychusak (1997); Ananda Everingham (2010); Akkaphan Namart (2019)

Red Eagle (Thai: อินทรีแดง) is a Thai superhero novel series created by Sek Dusit. The protagonist was Rome Rittikrai, a masked superhero for upholding justice. The work was first written and published in 1955. The character was conceived inspiration from the 1955 film Captain Lightfoot, starring by Rock Hudson. In the film, the protagonist portrays a "gentleman thief" driven by an altruistic ideology to assist the downtrodden while concealing his identity behind a red mask. Adopting a similar narrative structure, Sek Dusit created The Red Eagle. The name "Eagle" was chosen to symbolize immense power and the ability to soar at the highest altitudes—surpassing all other birds—thereby representing the character’s inherent greatness and elevated sense of purpose. The story incorporates the social problems of that era, such as deforestation and corruption, which the law could not reach. The Red Eagle series by Sek Dusit was written between 1955 and 1970. The work was highly popular among readers.

This story has been adapted into films and television dramas several times. The first instance occurred when Rangsan Tantiwong and Prateep Komolpish were preparing to produce a second film, following Chart Suea, and intended for Mitr Chaibancha to star in it. During that time, Mitr Chaibancha read the novel red eagle at Rangsan Tantiwong's house; he liked it and expressed his intention to play the role of red eagle because the character had dual personalities. Seeing the lead actor's determination, the producers and the director decided to take Mitr Chaibancha to meet Sek Dusit to purchase the rights to the red eagle novel, specifically the episode Jao Nakleng, for Mitr Chaibancha to play the role of red eagle for the first time in the film Jao Nakleng, which was first released on March 7, 1959.The film grossed over one million baht, which made Mitr Chaibancha famous nationwide. Since then (after becoming known and starting to gain fame from his first film, Chart Suea), Mitr also starred as Red Eagle in five other installments: Thap Saming Khla (1962), Awasan Insee Daeng (1963), Pisat Dam (1966), Jao Insee (1968), and Golden Eagle (1970). Mitr Chaibancha passed away while filming the helicopter rope ladder stunt scene in the latter film due to a technical error that caused the filming not to proceed as planned.

Following the Red Eagle films starring Mitr, there were other installments, including Bin Diao (1977) starring Singha Suriyong; Phrai Maha Kan (1980) starring Krung Srivilai; and Insee Phayong (1988) starring Jarunee Suksawat, Sorapong Chatree, and Marisa Udomporn. Later, in 2010, the story was remade under the title The Red Eagle, directed by Wisit Sasanatieng, with Ananda Everingham starring as the Red Eagle.

Most recently, it was adapted into a television drama in 2019, aired on Channel 7HD, produced by 9 Beaver Films Co., Ltd., and directed by Oliver Beaver. It starred Akkaphan Namart, Maylada Susri, Chanapol Satya, Apa Bhavilai, Ratthee Vorarojyothin, Randapa Muntalumpa, Santisuk Promsiri, and Atirut Singhaumpol.
