= Thong Dee Fun Khao =

- Thong Dee Fun Khao poster.
- Directed by: Bin Bunluerit
- Written by: Preayaporn Boonpa
- Produced by: Somsak Techaratanaprasert; Tanit Jitnukul; Bin Bunluerit
- Starring: Buakaw Banchamek; Sornsin Maneewan; Nantawut Boonrubsub; Vannapoom Songsuparp; Chutirada Junthit; Phutharit Prombandal; Jaran Ngamdee
- Cinematography: Angsumalee Senachai
- Edited by: Tanit Jitnukul
- Production companies: Bhin Boom Business Co., Ltd.
- Distributed by: Sahamongkol Film International
- Release date: 9 February 2017
- Running time: 120 minutes
- Country: Thailand
- Language: Thai
- Budget: 50 million baht

Thong Dee Fun Khao (Thai: ทองดีฟันขาว), known in English as Legend of the Broken Sword Hero, is a 2017 Thai action film, directed by Bin Bunluerit.

== Plot ==
An action movie based on history, Thong Dee Fun Khao tells the story of an indomitable determination, courage, loyalty, and the importance of life. The protagonist of Thong Dee Fun Khao is a heart-tough fighter with boxing ability. Fate led him to be a loyal soldier of King Taksin the Great. Martyrs fight to defend the country to become a hero of the Thai people, known as "Phraya Phichai Dap Hak".

== Cast ==
- Buakaw Banchamek as Thongdee
- Phutharit Prombandal as King Taksin
- Sornsin Maneewan as Ramyong
- Nantawut Boonrubsub as Cherd
- Kochakorn Nimakorn as Son
- Vannapoom Songsuparp as Boonkerd
- Chutirada Junthit as Mauylek
- Jaran Ngamdee as Khru How
- Kanchit Kwanpracha as Chao Mueang Phichai
- Rapeepat Ekpankul as Kam
- Manop Aswathep as Thiang
- Naiyan Chevanan as Thiang's wife
- Tana Sinprasat as Mek
- Teerayuth Pratchayabamrung as Mauylek's father
- Kangkad Jongjaipra

== Release ==
The film premiered on 9 February 2017 (Thailand)

== Original soundtrack ==
"Nai Thong Dee Fun Khao" (นายทองดีฟันขาว) by Yuenyong Opakul
