= Krung Srivilai =

- กรุง ศรีวิไล
- Krung Srivilai in 2026
- Born: Krungsrivilai Sutinphuek; Natee Sutinphuek (birth name); 7 February 1946 (age 80); Bang Bo, Samut Prakan, Thailand
- Occupations: Actor; politician
- Years active: 1966–present
- Known for: Krung Srivilai from Luk Yot (1971); Thep from Choo (1973); Sarttra from S.T.A.B. (1973) and Gold Raiders (1982); Thoed Yodthong from Sao 5 (1976)
- Children: 2, including Kamonwan "Elle" Srivilai (daughter) and Savakorn Sutinphuek (son)
- Awards: Golden Doll Award (1973)

Krung Srivilai (Thai: กรุง ศรีวิไล; February 7, 1946 –) is a Thai actor and politician, regarded as one of the leading male actors of the 1970s who made a lasting mark on the Thai film industry.

== Early life and career ==
Born in Bang Bo district, Samut Prakan province. Before entering the show business, Krung worked as a manual laborer at Khlong Toei Port, earning 80 baht a day for two years. He later entered the entertainment industry as an extra. He rose to fame as the leading actor in the 1971 film Luk Yot (ลูกยอด), starring opposite Petchara Chaowarat. The stage name "Krung Srivilai" was taken from the name of his character in the film, a polite young man from Ban Paen, Ayutthaya.

His breakthrough came at an important transitional period in the Thai film industry. At the time, Thai cinema was gradually moving away from the widely used 16 mm format, in which films were commonly dubbed after production, toward 35 mm filmmaking with synchronized sound recorded during filming, allowing actors' own voices to be captured rather than dubbed afterward. The period was also significant because the Thai film industry was seeking new leading male actors to fill the void left by the sudden death of legendary star Mitr Chaibancha, who had died unexpectedly shortly before. Krung Srivilai subsequently became one of the prominent leading men of Thai cinema during the 1970s.

He has appeared in more than 400 film and television productions throughout his career. At the height of his popularity, he was reportedly working on as many as nine films in a single day. He is widely regarded as one of director Chalong Pakdeevijit's most closely associated actors, having appeared in numerous productions directed by him. Krung is also considered one of the last actors to receive the Golden Doll Award for Best Supporting Actor personally presented by King Bhumibol Adulyadej (Rama IX). He received the award in 1973 for his performance in Choo (The Affair), directed by Pieak Poster.

== Political career ==
As he grew older, Krung took on more supporting and villainous roles. He later entered politics and was elected as a Member of Parliament (MP) for his home province of Samut Prakan, initially representing the People's Power Party. Over the course of his political career, he subsequently moved between several political parties, including Pheu Thai, Palang Pracharath, Bhumjaithai, and Kla Tham.
