= Kanchit Kwanpracha =

Thai actor

- ครรชิต ขวัญประชา
- Kanchit Kwanpracha in 2023
- Born: Kanchit Kiatsuchon; 18 May 1940 (age 86); Bang Khonthi, Samut Songkhram, Thailand
- Occupations: Actor; film director
- Years active: 1968–present
- Height: 184 cm (6 ft 0 in)

Kanchit Kwanpracha (Thai: ครรชิต ขวัญประชา; born May 18, 1940 –) is a Thai actor, best known for his role in Insee Thong (1970).

== Biography ==
He entered the entertainment industry in 1968, but initially struggled to achieve success. He eventually rose to prominence in 1970 with Insee Thong (Golden Eagle), in which he portrayed Phuwanat, the villain who impersonated the Insee Daeng (Red Eagle) and committed crimes throughout the city. This forces Rom Ritthikrai, the real Insee Daeng, to don a new costume and become the Insee Thong in order to track down the impostor and restore his reputation.

The film is regarded as a landmark in Thai cinema, as it was the final film in the acting career of legendary actor Mitr Chaibancha, who was killed in an accident after falling from a helicopter during the filming of the final scene in Pattaya.

As he grew older, his acting roles became less frequent, and he began appearing mainly in supporting roles in some films and television dramas, such as Tears of the Black Tiger (2000), The Legend of Suriyothai (2001), The Legend of King Naresuan Part V (2014).
