= Tanit Jitnukul =

Thai film director

- ธนิตย์ จิตนุกูล
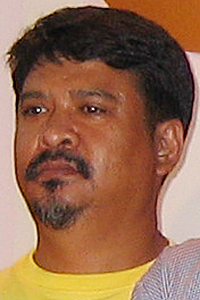
- Tanit Jitnukul at Siam Discovery in 2007
- Born: November 24, 1956 (age 69); Songkhla, Thailand
- Other name: Pued
- Occupations: Film director; screenwriter; producer; actor
- Years active: 1985–present
- Awards: Thailand National Film Awards 2000 -Best director: Bang Rajan; Fantasia Festival 2000 - Second-place film: Bang Rajan

Tanit Jitnukul (Thai: ธนิตย์ จิตนุกูล, RTGS: Thanit Chitnukun; born in 1956) is a Thai film director, screenwriter and producer. Among his films is the 2000 historical battle epic, Bang Rajan. His nickname is "Pued" (ปืด).

== Biography ==
Tanit graduated from Siam Vocational School. He started in the movie business as a film-poster artist. In 1985, he was the co-director on Suem Noi Noi Galon Mark Noi (Happy Go Lucky) with Adirek Wattaleela, better known in Thailand simply as "Uncle". Uncle would go on to produce Bang Rajan.

Tanit made his name directing a string of historical battle epics; Bang Rajan, Legend of the Warlord and Sema: Warrior of Ayutthaya. He has, however, worked in many genres, including horror (Art of the Devil and Narok), crime-action (102 Bangkok Robbery) and comedy (Andaman Girl).

He won best director honors at the Thailand National Film Awards for Bang Rajan. The film was also screened at the 2000 Fantasia Festival, where it placed second in the international competition. Bang Rajan was later "presented" by Oliver Stone in a theatrical release in the United States.

== Filmography ==
=== Director ===
- Suem Noi Noi Galon Mark Noi (Happy-Go-Lucky) (1985)
- Happy-Go-Lucky 2 (1986)
- Magic Moon (1991)
- Love Affaire (1997)
- Seua Jone Phan Seua (Crime King) (1998)
- Hello Countryside (1999)
- Bang Rajan (2000)
- Kun pan (Legend of the Warlord) (2002)
- Khunsuk (Sema: Warrior of Ayutthaya) (2003)
- Khon len khong (Art of the Devil)
- 102 piit krungthep plon (102 Bangkok Robbery) (2004)
- The Lord of Ayuthaya (Jao Tak) (2004; direct-to-video)
- Jee (Andaman Girl) (2005)
- Narok (Hell) (2005)
- Hak yae (Black Night, segment The Lost Memory) (2006)
- Ghost in Law (2008; co-director)
- First Flight (2008)
- Bang Rajan 2 (2010)
- Ghost Day (2012)

=== Producer ===
- Muay Thai Chaiya (2007)
- Jee (Andaman Girl) (2005)
- Narok (Hell) (2005)
- 14 tula, songkram prachachon (The Moonhunter) (2001)
- The Red Eagle (2010)
- Ghost Day (2012)

=== Screenwriter ===
- Bang Rajan (2000)
- Hak yae (Black Night) (2006)
- Ghost Day (2012)
- Myanmar in Love in Bangkok (2014)

=== Actor ===
- Sum muepuen (Hit Man File) (2005)
- Me ... Myself (2007)

=== Editor ===
- Thong Dee Fun Khao (2017)
