= Ghost Day =

Ghost Day may refer to:

- Ghost Day (film), a 2012 Thai horror comedy film
- For the Chinese holiday, see Ghost Festival
