= Yarinda Bunnag =

Thai architect, singer and actress (born 1980)

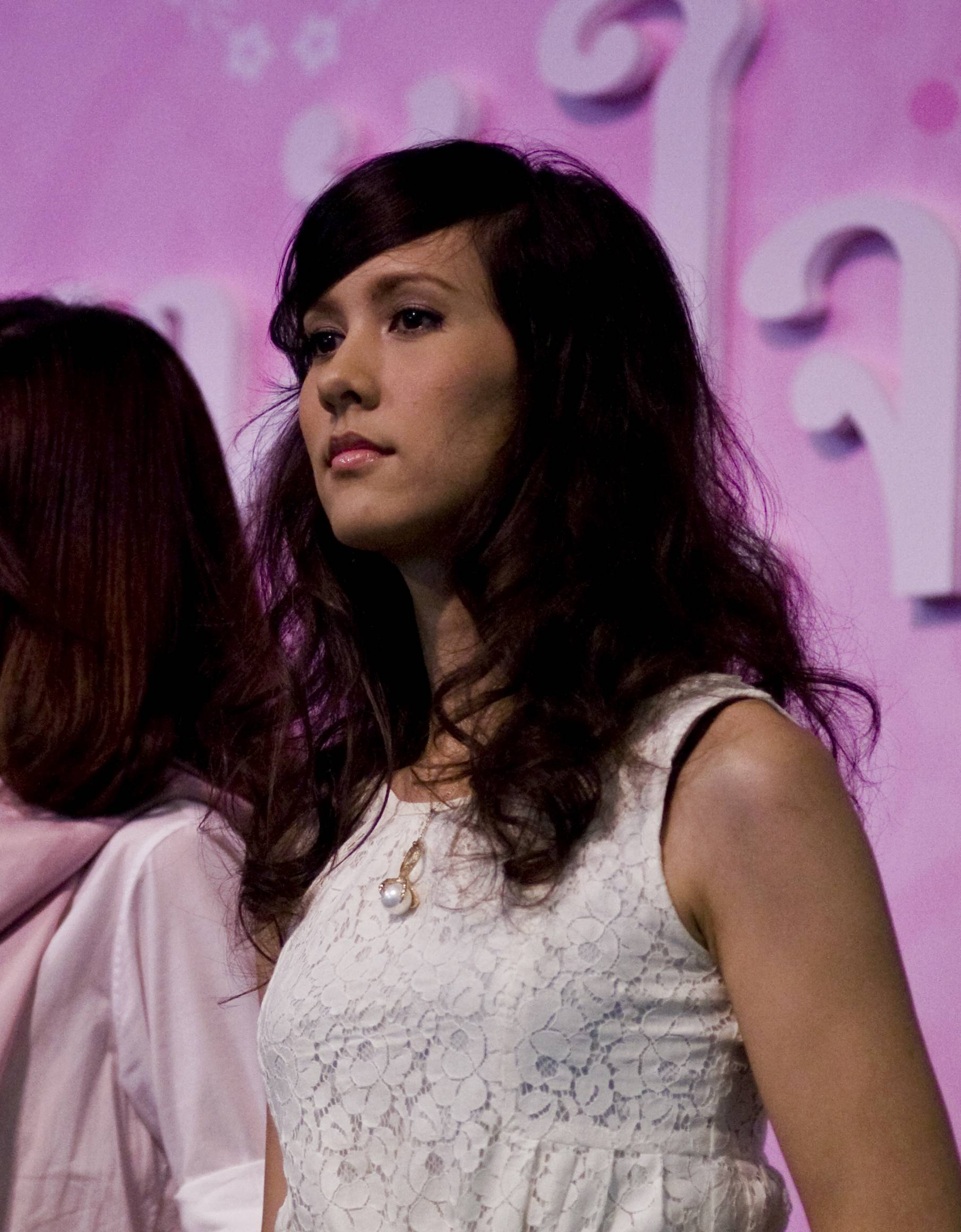
Yarinda Bunnag

Yarinda Bunnag (Thai: ญารินดา บุนนาค, born 6 November 1980) is a Thai architect, singer and actress. She became known in 2001 from the song "Kae Dai Kid Teung" (แค่ได้คิดถึง), released under GMM Grammy, before leaving to study architecture at Cornell University. After graduating, she joined the indie label Smallroom and released several albums in addition to working as an architect. She has also done acting work, starring in the films Best of Times (2009) and The Red Eagle (2010). In 2016, Yarinda Bunnag was invited to be the regional adviser of Asia Designer Communication Platform.

== Filmography ==
Film
Year	Title	Role
2009	Best of Times	Fai
2010	The Red Eagle	Vasana Tienpradap
2019	Dew	Orn

Television series
Year	Title	Role	Notes				
2021	Girl From Nowhere	Teacher Waan	Episode: "The Judgement"	2026	Broken (of) Love	Zhang Wei Ling	Episode: all
