= Patricia Tanchanok Good =

Thai-British actress and model (born 1997)

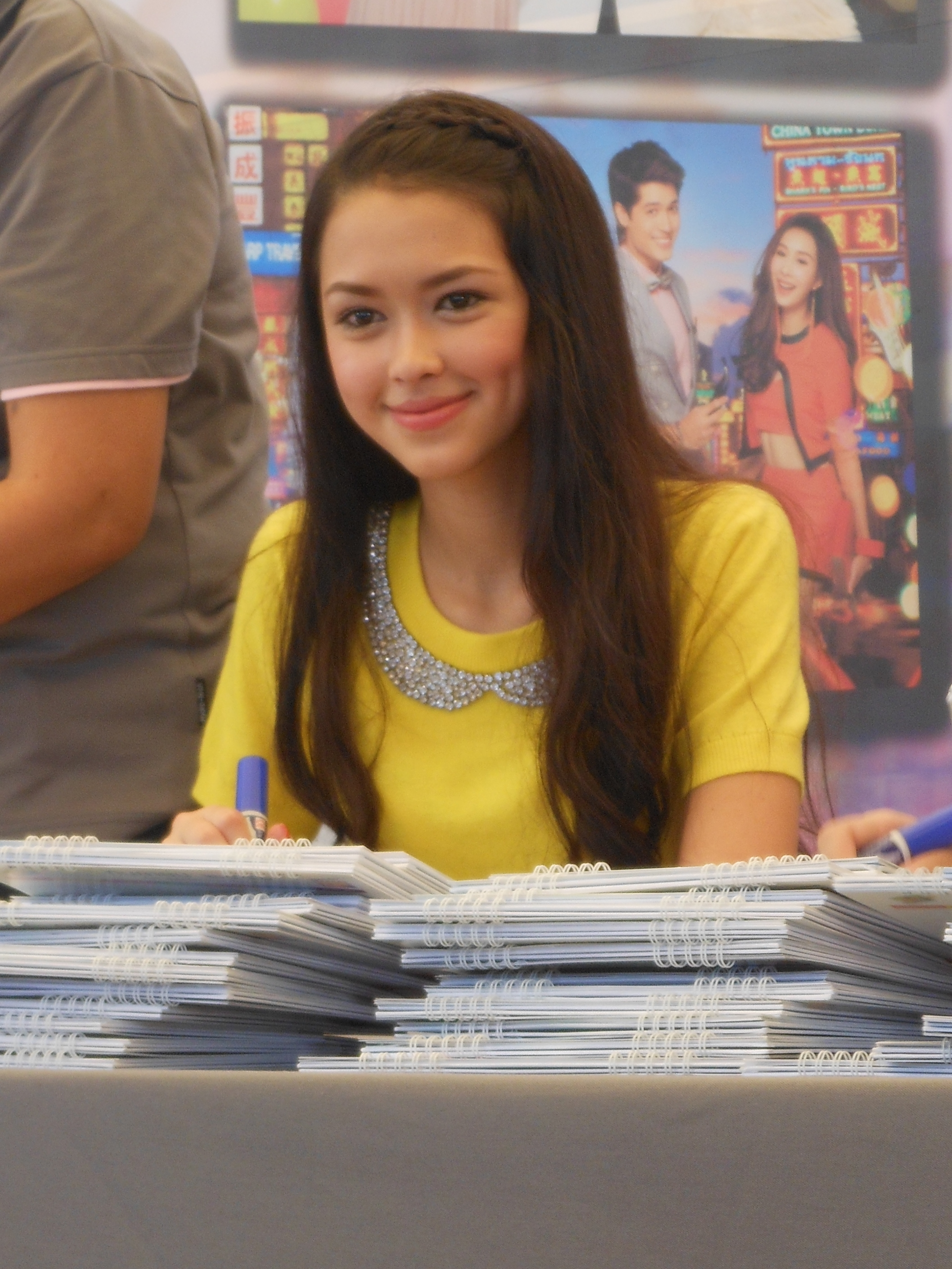
- Born: August 18, 1997 (age 29); Phuket
- Education: Faculty of Communication Arts Chulalongkorn University
- Occupations: actress; model
- Height: 1.7 m (5 ft 7 in)
- Spouse: Note Vises (2022-present)
- Parents: David Good (father); Piyanuch Good (mother)

Patricia Tanchanok Good (Thai: แพทริเซีย ธัญชนก กู๊ด; born 18 August 1997) is a Thai-British actress and model currently signed as an actor under Channel 3 HD.

== Early life ==
Patricia Tanchanok Good was born on August 18, 1997, in Choeng Thale Subdistrict, Thalang District, Phuket Province. She is the eldest daughter of David Good and Piyanuch Good. She has a younger brother, Matthew Good (born 2002), who was born and raised in Phuket. She moved to live in Bangkok, following her father who moved there for work, when she was 8 years old in 2005 after the devastating tsunami on Sunday December 26, 2004.

== Career ==
Tanchanok started her career in the entertainment industry when her mother's best friend, known as a former famous heroine and Channel 3 drama producer, Janjira Jujaeng, persuaded her to be cast as an actress. Her first job was as a model for various magazines and she later appeared in television commercials before acting in a full-fledged television drama when it was selected by Somjing Srisuphap.

Her first drama work is Nhoom Ban Rai Kub Wan Jai Hi-So in 2012, playing the role of Noi Na. She later became the first full-length heroine by acting alongside Yuke Songpaisan in the drama Kaen Sanaeha in 2013.

== Filmography ==
=== Television series ===
Year	Title	Role
2012	Noom Ban Rai Kub Wan Ja Hai So	Noi Na
2013	Kaen Sanaeha	Rung Pannathon / Wimonphayon Ransiya
2014	Malee Rerng Rabam	Malee
2015	Lom Son Rak	Anna
2016	Buang Athithan	Yosita / Kadapa
2017	Sai Lub Jub Abb	Phornnangfah
2018	Ded Peek Nangfah	Khanuengnang Jitphaisal
2019	Nee Ruk Nai Krong Fai	Chalita Yotinnapat
2021	Girl from Nowhere Season 2	Minnie (Ep. 3)
2022	Poisonous Passion	Parichat
2022	My Friend, the Enemy	"Beam" Maleewan Bumroongnakorn
2023	You Touched My Heart	Unyamani Changwangprawas / Anne Zhang
2023	The Betrayal	"Kate" Kharisa

=== Film ===
Year	Title	Role
2025	Serpent Beauty	Anna

== Awards ==
Year	Nominated work	Category	Result
2019	Japan Expo Performance Award 2019	A person who excels in acting in dramas or movies that promote Japan.	Won
2024	Ganesha Award 12th	Best Actress	Won
2024	Nataraja Award 15th	Best Actress	Nominated
