= Dew (film) =

- Theatrical release poster
- Directed by: Chukiat Sakveerakul
- Written by: Chukiat Sakveerakul; Sorawit Muangkaew
- Produced by: Yeonu Choi
- Starring: Sukollawat Kanaros; Sadanont Durongkavarojana; Pawat Chittsawangdee; Darisa Karnpoj; Yarinda Bunnag
- Cinematography: Nikorn Sripongwarakul
- Edited by: Manussa Vorasingha; Chukiat Sakveerakul; Masarat Panitnantapat
- Music by: Chapavich Temnitikul
- Production companies: CJ Major Entertainment; Slap Monster; M Pictures
- Distributed by: CJ Major Entertainment
- Release date: 31 October 2019
- Running time: 125 minutes
- Country: Thailand
- Language: Thai

Dew, known in Thai as Dew, Pai Duai Kan Na (ดิว ไปด้วยกันนะ 'Dew, let's go together') is a 2019 Thai drama film directed by Chookiat Sakveerakul and released by CJ Major Entertainment. It stars Sukollawat Kanaros, Sadanont Durongkavarojana, Pawat Chittsawangdee, Darisa Karnpoj and Yarinda Bunnag. The film tells the story of Pob and Dew, teenage boys who develop feelings for each other amid the prevailing homophobic attitudes of 1990s Thai society, but then become parted. Two decades later, Pob, now married, returns to his hometown as a teacher, and meets a female student who reminds him of their past unfulfilled relationship.

The film received muted audience interest and performed modestly at the box office. Critics commended the acting but found the screenplay—a remake of the 2001 South Korean film Bungee Jumping of Their Own—lacking. Sadanont won best actor awards at the Suphannahong and Bangkok Critics Assembly awards, while Pawat also won best supporting actor at the latter.

== Plot ==
In the small town of Pang Noi, in 1996, upper-secondary schoolboy Pob meets Dew, who is new to town. They become friends, and gradually get closer. The next summer holidays, while in Chiang Mai for tutorial lessons, they get into an argument but soon realise their passion for each other, kissing in a phone booth. However, when a friend notices their relationship, Pob abruptly leaves. He continues to ignore Dew as the next school year begins, and when Dew confronts him, they get into a fight, Pob saying that he doesn't want to be like Dew and become a social leper, prompting Dew to hit him. Their parents are brought in, and they both face tensions at home, Pob being verbally abused by his Chinese father and Dew's mother unable to say that she still loves him.

As word gets out, Dew is bullied at school, but Pob calls him to their secret meeting place, and they make up as Pob offers to take Dew's place at therapy camp sessions for students with sexually deviant behaviour, which Dew is now forced to attend. That evening, Dew talks to Pob about running away together. Incidentally, Pob's father finds out about the camp, and hits and disowns him, prompting Pob to leave. Pob sends Dew a pager message asking him to meet and catch the last train out of town that night, but Dew's mother finds out and confronts Dew, pleading for him not to leave. He tearfully tells Pob over the phone that he can't go, and Pob angrily leaves alone, telling him to forget everything they ever had.

Twenty-two years later, Pob returns to Pang Noi with his wife Orn, starting a new job as a teacher at his old school. He is assigned by Ms Ratchanee, his supervisor and former teacher, to take care of Liu, a problem student. As he tries to reach out to her, some of her speech and mannerisms remind him of Dew. They bond further as he takes her with a group of students for a quiz competition in Chiang Mai, and Liu seems to recall some memories as well. When she confronts Pob for secretly handing in an assignment she missed, he replies that he wants to make amends to someone who might represent a friend he once knew, to which Liu asks him to stop, as she wants to be like everyone else.

It is revealed that a year after running away, Pob returned home to find out that Dew had been hit by a car and died the night he left. They had also carved their names on a cabin door at Pha Daeng, their secret meeting place in the hills, which Liu recognizes when she visits the place with friends. Meanwhile, Pob grows distant from Orn as he mulls over the past. Sometime later, while attempting to enforce discipline, Pob gets into a fistfight with Liu's boyfriend Top, and Top is expelled after Liu sides with Pob, telling the truth that Top started the fight. Confused of her own feelings, she later asks Pob to explain the carved names. He visits her at the flat where she lives alone, and finds her room plastered with Dew's interests, including the Magic Eye 3D illusions he used to show Pob. They confirm their suspicions that Liu is Dew reincarnated, and embrace, but are cut short by Top, who was recording them. As the video goes out, Orn leaves Pob, and he loses his job, though Ms Ratchanee expresses her understanding and, recognizing he was talking to Dew, tells him not to let past wounds keep him from growing up.

Pob returns to Pha Daeng, speaking to his memory of Dew that he will try to grow past his feelings of guilt. Meanwhile, Dew's memories come flooding back to Liu, and she rushes to meet Pob at the station, and they reunite, both now fully recognizing her as Dew. After some extended time traveling and spending time together, they go bungee jumping. Pob asks for confirmation that this isn't the end, to which Liu replies that there will be a new path, before they detach their cables and jump hand in hand.

== Cast ==
- Sukollawat Kanaros as Pob (adult)
- Sadanont Durongkavarojana as young Pob
- Pawat Chittsawangdee, as Dew
- Darisa Karnpoj as Liu
- Yarinda Bunnag as Orn
- Warapun Saptanaudom as Teacher Ratchanee
- Apasiri Chantrasmi as Dew's mother
- Zhu Shaoyu as Pob's father
- Pantach Kankham as Top

== Production ==
Dew was produced by CJ Major Entertainment—a joint venture between South Korean media company CJ ENM and Thailand's Major Cineplex—in association with Slap Monster and M Pictures. The film was one of three adaptations of South Korean works the studio released in 2019. It is a remake of the 2001 South Korean film Bungee Jumping of Their Own, and was known during production by the working title That March. Yeonu Choi served as producer, with Hyerim Oh and Kanokporn Boontamcharoen as co-producers. Chookiat Sakveerakul was approached to direct the film, and he wrote the screenplay adaptation together with Sorawit Muangkaew.

In contrast to the South Korean original, in which the protagonists begin as a young heterosexual couple and the girl dies and is reincarnated as a male student, Chookiat decided to significantly alter the story and placed the homosexual relationship in the past, when the relevant social issues could be strongly presented. Some of the events depicted in the early segment were drawn from his own experiences. He cites "romance—the belief that true love and miracles do exist—" as his main approach to the story and motivation for the project. The film is dedicated to his partner Noppadon Khanrat, who died before its release.

== Release and reception ==
Dew was released on 31 October 2019. It received muted responses, placing sixth at the box office over its opening weekend, during which it earned 4.42 million baht. By the end of its theatrical run following the weekend of 21–24 November, it had earned 10.14 million baht.

Critical opinion about the film was mostly reserved. Many reviewers thought the screenplay in the second half was lacking, and failed to convince the audience to believe in the supernatural elements, which seemed forced. News website The Momentum's reviewer noted, "The film has to try very hard to convince others that this is actually Dew in Liu's body. It has to try very hard to make the audience believe that Liu and Pob's love is real. It ends up alternating between 'the two of us against the world' and 'selfish lovers running away together'." Mano Vanawearusit, writing for IT/lifestyle website Beartai, noted that the film was held back by the creative choices taken in adapting the source material. By placing the gay relationship in the first half, the story lost steam in the second as it was reduced to repeating the forbidden love theme in a less sympathetic context.

On the other hand, Mano and other reviewers commended the cast's strong acting, which helped carry the film despite the awkward storytelling. Prawit Taengaksorn, writing for news website The Standard, praised Sukollawat and Sadanont in particular, noting that Sukollawat "sympathetically conveyed a man burdened by a past that has never faded from his mind", and that Sadanont's young Pob, "beneath the stoic exterior, allowed us to sense the fragility of the character". Reviewers also liked the first segment, finding that, while not offering much originality, it delicately pictured the characters' forbidden romance amid the rural 1990s setting. The Momentum's reviewer called it "extremely beautiful, extremely painful", and Prawit noted that this was aided by "the production design and cinematography that conjured up an imaginary northern town so dreamily".

Dew received nine nominations at the 28th Bangkok Critics Assembly Awards, held for Thai films released in 2019, and won in two categories: Best Actor for Sadanont, and Best Supporting Actor for Pawat. Sadanont also won the Best Actor category at the 29th Suphannahong National Film Awards, which combined the 2019 and 2020 seasons due to the COVID-19 pandemic; the film received six other nominations at the event.
