= 102 Bangkok Robbery =

- German DVD cover
- Directed by: Tanit Jitnukul
- Screenplay by: Tiger Team
- Produced by: Somsak Techarattanaprasert
- Starring: Chatchai Plengpanich; Amphol Lampoon; Kowit Wattanakul; Prakasit Bosuwan; Witit Lat; Bunthin Thuaikaew; Phongsanart Winsiri; Sothon Rungruang; Khajonsak Rattananissai; Setthathorn Thitithanaseth; Setthavit Panpeng
- Cinematography: Thirawat Rujintham
- Edited by: Uruphong Raksasat
- Distributed by: Sahamongkol Film International
- Release date: 29 April 2004
- Running time: 89 minutes
- Country: Thailand
- Language: Thai
- Box office: 18.6 million baht (Thailand)

102 Bangkok Robbery (Thai: 102 ปิดกรุงเทพปล้น) is a 2004 Thai action film starring Amphol Lampoon and Chatchai Plengpanich, released on April 29, 2004. It was produced by Sahamongkol Film International and directed by Tanit Jitnukul.

== Synopsis ==
The government announced it would repay all of its loans to the IMF, sparking an underground coalition of powerful and influential economic figures in the country who disagreed with the idea, which led to the creation of the 102-minute action plan to prevent the repayment of the IMF debt.

A group of professional terrorists are drawn into this operation under the leadership of Nawin (Amphol Lampoon), an international terrorist who is a skilled soldier but had to retire from the nightmare of war. He is forced to return to take this job because he owes a life debt to General Anusorn, one of the organization's leaders, without Nawin knowing that he is just a tool for revenge and a victim of the plan.

With so little time left to count, Pakorn (Chatchai Plengpanich), the head of the counter-terrorism unit both domestically and internationally, investigates every step of the way, and the government's ultimatum: "The money must be transferred to the IMF to pay off the debt of the entire country."

A massive amount of bombs are being planted all over Bangkok. Pakorn must uncover the entire plan for Nawin's operation. As the 102-minute operation progresses, the ultimate goal of the plan gradually becomes clear. The 75 tons of gold in the National Bank's vault is the objective of this operation. Pakorn and his team, along with Nawin's 102-minute operation, must compete against each other in a race against time that is running out. It depends on who will reach their destination first, a destination that both of them know in their hearts.
