= Sansanee Wattananukul =

Thai actress and voice actress

- ศันสนีย์ วัฒนานุกูล
- Born: Sansanee Samanworawong (ศันสนีย์ สมานวรวงศ์); 14 November 1945 (age 80); Buriram, Thailand
- Occupations: Actress; voice actress
- Known for: Thai voices of: Nobita; Arale; Sailor Mercury
- Spouse: Chuchat Wattananukul
- Children: 2

Sansanee Wattananukul (Thai: ศันสนีย์ วัฒนานุกูล; RTGS: Sansani Watthananukun; born 14 November 1945, in Buriram Province), née Samanworawong (Thai: สมานวรวงศ์) is a Thai actress and voice actress, best known for her role in the anime series Doraemon as Nobi Nobita. She began her career as a voice actress in 1982. Currently, she works for Channel 9. She has also played the leading roles in the popular drama Ban Sai Thong aired in the late 1970s on Channel 9, and in the film Best of Times in 2009.

== Filmography ==
=== Voice over roles ===
==== Anime ====
- Doraemon as Nobita Nobi
- Dr. Slump (Channel 9 dub) as Arale Norimaki
- Fist of the North Star as Bat, Yuria, Mamiya
- Cobra (Channel 9 dub) as Lady Armaroid
- Kingyo Chūihō! (Channel 9 dub) as Chitose Fujinomiya
- Peppa Pig as Peppa Pig (fan made dub by Amaya Weston)
- Lady!! as Sarah Frances Russell
- Hunter × Hunter (Channel 9 dub) as Kurapika
- Dragon Quest: Dai no Daibōken (Channel 9 dub) as Leona
- Idol Tenshi Youkoso Youko (Channel 9 dub) as Youko
- Dream Soldier Wingman (Channel 9 dub) - Aoi Yume
- Sailor Moon (Channel 9 dub, rerun on air 2012.) as Sailor Mercury
- Pokémon (Channel 9 dub) as Kasumi, Masato, Hikari
- Saint Seiya: The Lost Canvas (Channel 9 dub) as Crane Yuzuriha
- Ojamajo Doremi as Doremi Harukaze
- Nintama Rantarō as Rantarō Inadera
- Beyblade as Takao Kinomiya
- Pretty Cure as Honoka Yukishiro
- Pretty Cure Splash Star as Mai Mishou
- Corrector Yui as Yui Kasuga
- Mirmo! (Channel 9 dub) as Kaede Minami
- Pygmalio as Orie/Angel, Leon
- Glass Mask (Channel 9 dub) as Maya Kitajima
- Inazuma Eleven (Channel 9 dub) as Ichirōta Kazemaru, Touko Zaizen, Fuyuka "Fuyuppe" Kudō
- Rockman.EXE as Mayl Sakurai
- Hanada Shōnen Shi as Ichiro Hanada
- Digimon Savers (Channel 9 dub) as Yoshi Fujieda
- Bakugan Battle Brawlers as Marucho Marukuro, Alice Gehabich
- Idaten Jump as Sho Yamato
- Powerpuff Girls Z (Channel 9 dub) as Miyako Goutokuji/Rolling Bubbles
- Battle Spirits: Shounen Toppa Bashin as Suiren/My Sunshine
- Beyblade: Metal Fusion as Kenta Yumiya
- Shaman King as Manta Oyamada, Lyserg Diethel
- Love Hina as Naru Narusegawa
- Fruits Basket as Tohru Honda
- Tenjho Tenge as Aya Natsume
- Zatch Bell! as Mizuno Suzume
- Yakitate!! Japan as Tsukino Azusagawa
- Tokyo Mew Mew as Momomiya Ichigo
- Grander Musashi as Musashi Kazama
- Cardcaptor Sakura as Kinomoto Sakura
- The Mythical Detective Loki Ragnarok as Daidōji Mayura
- Anpanman as Batako San
- Full Metal Panic! as Teletha Tessa Testarossa
- D.N. Angel as Harada Risa
- Saikano as Chise
- Chūka Ichiban! as Zhi Lao/Shirou
- Kiddy Grade as Lumière
- Oh My Goddess! as Belldandy
- Negima! Magister Negi Magi as Negi Springfield
- Hellsing as Seras Victoria
- School Rumble as Tsukamoto Tenma
- Sailor Moon Sailor Stars as Tsukino Usagi
- Digimon Adventure as Takenouchi Sora, Takeru Takaishi
- Digimon Adventure 02 as Takenouchi Sora, Takeru Takaishi, Hikari Yagami

==== Tokusatsu dubbing ====
- Chōjin Sentai Jetman as Kaori Rokumeikan
- Kyōryū Sentai Zyuranger as Mei/Reiko Chiba
- Ryuuten no ouhi – Saigo no koutei as Hiro (Takako Tokiwa)
- ChalkZone as Penny Sanchez

=== Television ===
Year	Title	Role	Notes
1972	Wimarn Fai (วิมานไฟ)	Rinthong (รินทอง)	
1977	Rak Prakasit (1977) (รักประกาศิต)	Narisara (นริศรา)	
1978	Suea Noi (เสือน้อย)	Siriniran (สิรินิรันดร์)	
1978	Ban Sai Thong (บ้านทรายทอง)	Photchaman Sawangwong (พจมาน สว่างวงศ์)	Broadcast on the Channel 9 (Modernine TV)
1978	Koo Gum (คู่กรรม; RTGS: Khu Kam)	Angsumalin (อังศุมาลิน)	
1978	Fai Gam Prae (ฝ้ายแกมแพร)	Thippayang (ทิพยางค์)	
1980	Bhap Slai (บาปสลาย)	()	
1981	Karuhat Dam (คฤหาสน์ดำ)	()	
1977	Thantawan (1997) (ทานตะวัน)	Orn (อร)	
2009	Sai Lap The Series (สายลับเดอะซีรี่ส์ กับ 24 คดีสุดห้ามใจ)	Yuko	Episodes 21–22 - Case 20: Rak Thoe Chang... Angsumalin (คดี 20: รักเธอจัง..อังศุมาลิน)
2012	Sao Noi 2012 (สาวน้อย)	Mae Nim (แม่นิ่ม)	
2013	Sut Sai Pan (สุดสายป่าน)	Princess Consort Laksami Surayakan (หม่อมเจ้าหญิงลักษมี สูรยกานต์)	
2014	Rak Ok Rit (รักออกฤทธิ์)	Warang (วรางค์)	
2015	Pritsana (ปริศนา)	Professor Sa-nguan (อาจารย์สงวน)	
2016	Saluk Jit 2016 (สลักจิต)	Princess (เสด็จพระองค์เจ้าหญิง)	
2016	Ngao Asoke 2016 (เงาอโศก)	Bpeeyachat's Grandma (ยายเทียม)	
2017	Sai Lub Jub Abb (สายลับจับแอ๊บ)	Nounjan Majchatrakul (คุณหญิงย่านวลจันทร์ มัจฉาตระกูล)	
20	Nam Pueng Kom (2023) (น้ำผึ้งขม)	()	

=== Television series ===
- 2017 Princess Hours Thai (รักวุ่น ๆ เจ้าหญิงจอมจุ้น) (/True4U) as (สมเด็จพระนางเจ้าหิรัญญิการ์/พระพันปีหลวง)
- 2022 10 Years Ticket (หนังรักเรื่องที่แล้ว) (The One Enterprise-GMMTV/GMM 25) as Pum (ยายปุ้ม) With Yong Chernyim

=== Film ===
Year	Title	Role	Notes
1974	Talad Arom	Kang	
2006	Metrosexual (แก๊งชะนีกับอีแอบ)	Pang's Mother	
2009	Best of Times (ความจำสั้น.. แต่รักฉันยาว)	Ms. Sompit	Won—Kom Chad Luek Award # 7 for Best Supporting Actress; Won—Star Entertainment Awards 2009 for Best Supporting Actress; Won—Supannahong Award 19 for Best Supporting Actress
