= The Betrayal (Thai TV series) =

2023 Thai television series

- Official series poster
- Genre: Revenge; Psychological thriller Drama; Dark romantic
- Based on: Doctor Foster by Mike Bartlett
- Starring: Ann Thongprasom; Ananda Everingham; Patricia Tanchanok Good
- Country of origin: Thailand

Production
- Production company: Juvenile Company Limited

Original release
- Network: Channel 3 HD
- Release: 23 August – 12 October 2023

Related
- Doctor Foster (TV series) The World of the Married The Broken Marriage Vow

The Betrayal (Thai: เกมรักทรยศ) is a Thai television series. The series is adapted from the British TV series Doctor Foster, from BBC Studios starring Ann Thongprasom, Ananda Everingham and Patricia Tanchanok Good, with Chatayodom Hiranyasthiti and Rinlanee Sripen. broadcast on Channel 3 HD on August 23, 2023.

== Cast ==
=== Main cast ===
- Ann Thongprasom as Dr. Janepitcha Pattanakit, MD.
- Ananda Everingham as Athin
- Patricia Tanchanok Good as Kate

=== Supporting cast ===
- Sutthirak Subvijitra as Tul
- Sakuntala Teinpairoj as Rose
- Chatayodom Hiranyatithi as Chat
- Rinlanee Sripen as Unna
- Penpak Sirikul as Mintra
- Sakrat Ruekthamrong as Bunya
- Nattapat Nimjirawat as Phat
- Machida Sutthikulphanich as Ploy

=== Guest appearances ===
- Namnung Suttidachanai as Toei
- Rapheephong Thapsuwan as Non
- Neeranuch Pattamasoot
- Pijika Jittaputta as June
- Kulteera Yordchang as Nana
- Panuwat Premmaneenan as
- Paythai Ploymeeka as Dan
- Hassaya Isereekul
- Warisra Kanweerayothin
- Thanutchaya Treesirikasem
- Orasri Balenciaga Honnold
- Paramej Noiam as Kirk
- Suphakit Wetsarojkit
- Merinya Nithitworasit
- Teerapat Vongchanphen
- Dujdao Vadhanapakorn
- Jakkrit Yompayorm
- Chuthachinee Juntranggur
- Pawarisa Surathin
- Jessica Corrigan
- Siriya Naruenat
- Chuerchart Wongsawat as Chuerchart Wongsawat
- Paradee Yoopasuk as Paradee Yoopasuk
- Aiyanun Lertsintapanont
- Kannida Ubolchart
- Mapord Nuttayothin
- Tawanchai Posayajinda
- Ratcha-arpa-ake Tansiriwanlobp
- Phimtawan Posayajinda
- Chanida Chomchalao
- Nichamon Shintadapong
- Nalita Seeanukul
- Marisa Lane
- Panjarat Kulma
- Sirinchaya Boonsuwan
- Sunicha Trakulnarong
- Kantapong Phesitthawee
- Waranya Waewsawat
- Lerwith Sangsith

== Original soundtracks ==
=== 2023 ===
No.	Title	Lyrics	Music	Artist(s)	Length
1.	"Jome" (Thai: จม)	Narongvit Taechatanawat	Poramet Mueansanit	Suthita Chanachaisuwan (Image)	3:50
2.	Untitled (Thai: ตื่นมาพรุ่งนี้ต้องหายใจอยู่บนโลกนี้ให้ได้)	Narongvit Taechatanawat	Chackkrit Muckkanaso	Ekkapan Wannasut (Piaw)	4:36
Total length:					07:26
