= Daboyway =

Thai rapper (born 1981)

DABOYWAY ปริญญา อินทชัย
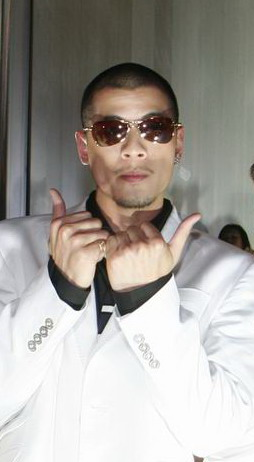
- Daboyway at MAA 2006

Background information
- Born: Prinya Intachai; January 10, 1981 (age 45); Paterson, New Jersey, United States
- Genres: Hip hop
- Occupations: Rapper; songwriter; producer; actor
- Years active: 1999–present
- Labels: Def Jam South East Asia
- Formerly of: Thaitanium

Prinya Intachai (Thai: ปริญญา อินทชัย), better known as DABOYWAY is an American-born Thai rapper, songwriter, producer and actor. He gained recognition through the early days formation of ‘Thaitanium’ with his two friends Khanngoen "Khan" Nuanual and Nay Myo "Day" Thant back in 2000. Today, the group remains the biggest selling Hip Hop act in Thailand and South East Asia.

Over the past couple of years, Daboyway has been establishing himself as a solo artist. In 2016, he released “Yeah Yeah Yeah”, an English single which received 21 million views on YouTube and 6 million streams.

== Early life ==
Daboyway was born in Paterson, New Jersey to Thai immigrants. He spent his childhood in Brooklyn, New York where he developed an admiration for sports in which he excelled: basketball and track. Other than sports, Daboyway loved watching films in his free time. He said, "We pretended and mimicked different characters and quickly developed an interest in performing arts."

== Musical career ==
In 1997, upon graduating from High School, Daboyway took a 2-month break and travelled back to Bangkok. Initially, the trip was meant to meet his family members in Thailand but Daboyway quickly made new friends and started writing songs. Fast forward 2 years later since his arrival, Daboyway released his first pop album. During the two and a half years he spent in Bangkok, Daboyway got himself into music and acting. In 1999, Daboyway moved back to the US to finish his GED and took some acting classes to pursue the dream of being an actor. In September 2019, Daboyway was recruited to be part of the newly formed major label, Def Jam Recordings South East Asia.

== Acting career ==
Before leaving Thailand, Daboyway made his acting debut in 1999 starting in a Thai horror film, 303 Fear Faith Revenge. Throughout his acting career, he goes under his real name, Prinya Intachai. Daboyway made his Hollywood debut in 2002, starring in a Thai produced action film, Province 77. In 2010, he starred in the American romantic comedy film The Prince & Me: The Elephant Adventure.

== Discography ==
=== Albums ===
- Daboyway (2020)

=== Compilation albums ===
- Def Jam Thailand Compilation : Thai School Vol. 1 (2020)

=== Singles ===
- Chill ft. Bank Cash(2013)
- BadBoy ft. Rogi Wallace (2015)
- No way without you (2015)
- Robin Hood ft. Born I Music(2015)
- Ngor Mai Pen ft. Big P Tycoon (2015)
- Las Vegas (Remix) ft DJ WHOOKID & Nipsey Hussle (2015)
- Understand Me ft. Anarchy (2016)
- All the Way Up (Asian Remix)
- Do my dance (2017)
- One ft. SD & KH (2017)
- Kwaan ft. Young Bong (2017)
- Make It Happen ft. Yaya Urassaya (2017)
- Yeah Yeah Yeah (2017)
- Kaow Ma ft. Angkanag Koonchai (2017)
- Comin home (2017)
- Fire ft. Sunaree (2018)
- Same thing(Every night) ft. Radio3000 (2018)
- Now & Never ft. Violette Wautier & F. Hero(2018)
- MAI AOW ft Youngohm (2019)
- GangSh!t ft. Radio3000 (2019)
- Mhong ft twopee (2019)
- Tonight ft. Wonderframe (2019)
- Deep down ft Violette Wautier (2019)
- Air (2019)
- Won Arai (2019)
- Baby You (2020)
- Break you down ft. Violette Wautier (2020)

=== Master of Ceremony: MC ===
Online

- 2021 WAY'S WORLD On Air YouTube:DABOYWAY
