= Memory (2008 film) =

- Theatrical release poster
- Directed by: Torpong Tunkamhang
- Written by: Torpong Tunkamhang
- Starring: Ananda Everingham; Mai Charoenpura
- Release date: 2008
- Country: Thailand

Memory is a Thai horror film released in 2008. It stars Ananda Everingham and Mai Charoenpura.

== Plot ==
Krit, a married psychiatrist in Chiang Mai, is tasked with looking in on Phrae, an abused, 7-year-old girl. Her mother, Ing-orn, cannot explain the bruises on the girl's body. As he participates in the case, Krit finds himself falling in love with Ing-orn.
