= Phraya Phichai =

Siamese military commander

- พระยาพิชัย
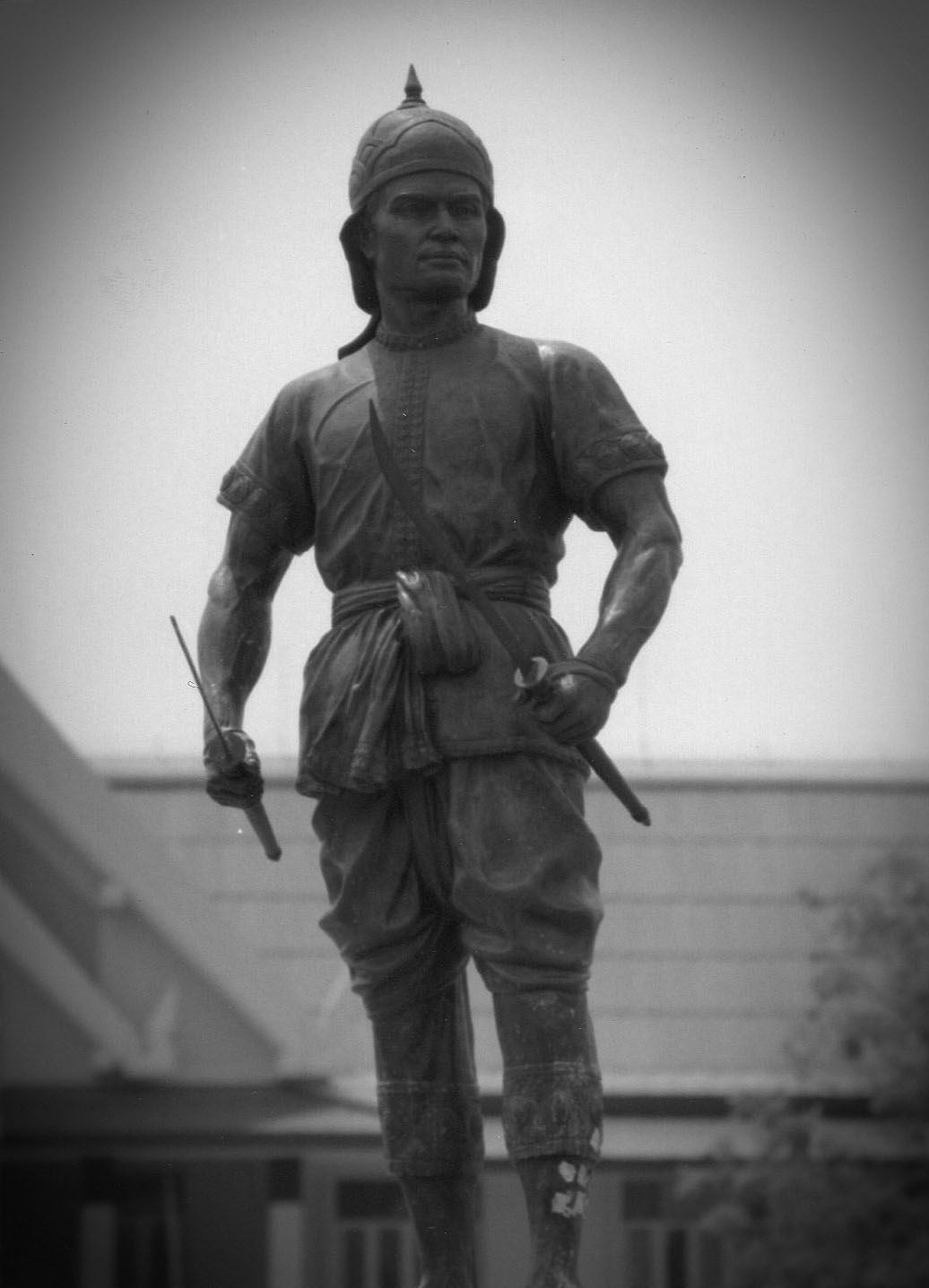
- Monument of Phraya Phichai Dap Hak, in front of Uttaradit City Hall.
- Born: Choi (จ้อย); 1741; Ban Huai Kha, Phichai, Uttaradit Province, Ayutthaya Kingdom
- Died: 7 April 1782 (aged 41); Thonburi, Rattanakosin Kingdom
- Military career
- Allegiance: Thonburi Kingdom
- Rank: Phraya
- Conflicts: Burmese–Siamese War (1765–1767); Burmese–Siamese War (1775–1776)

Phraya Phichai (Thai: พระยาพิชัย), or popularly known as Phraya Phichai Dap Hak (Thai: พระยาพิชัยดาบหัก; lit: "Phraya Phichai of the broken sword") (1741–1782) was a historic Siamese nobleman of Mon descent who served as a military leader under King Taksin of the Thonburi Kingdom. He legendarily became known for fighting with a sword in each hand until one was broken.

== Background ==
Phraya Phichai was a Siamese general serving under King Thaksin. After the fall of Ayutthaya in 1767, Phraya Phichai and Chao Phraya Chakri (who later became the first King of the Chakri dynasty) followed Phraya Taksin in repelling the Burmese and reuniting Siam. They were considered Phraya Taksin's left and right hands (though some accounts state that Phraya Chakri and Maha Sura Singhanat held those positions).

In 1782, King Taksin showed signs of mental illness. At that time, the nation still lacked stability and was in need of a strong ruler. King Taksin was deposed and later executed following a coup, after which Chao Phraya Chakri took the throne. Phraya Phichai, a devout follower of King Taksin, was not spared and, by most accounts, requested his own execution to follow King Taksin to his death. He was executed soon after.

== Early life ==
=== Birth ===
Phraya Phichai was born in 1741 at Ban Huai Kha, Phichai District, Uttaradit Province. He had four brothers and sisters, but three of them died before his birth. His parents are unknown. His birth name was Choi (Thai: จ้อย; meaning "the little one").

=== Childhood ===
As a young boy, Choi loved to practice Thai boxing and would frequently run away to train in the art without his parents' knowledge. He trained with many teachers of that era.

One day, Choi traveled northward and met a boxing instructor named Thiang (Thai: เที่ยง) at Wat Ban Kaeng. Choi became a beloved student of Instructor Thiang and was renamed Thong Di (Thai: ทองดี). His instructor called him Thong Di Fan Khao (Thai: ทองดีฟันขาว; "Thong Di of the white teeth") as he did not chew betel nut. Historically, Thai people chewed betel nut, which blackened their teeth, until the government under Field Marshal Plaek Phibunsongkhram issued a ban on the practice in 1942.

== Career ==
=== Serving the Crown ===
When Phraya Tak (later King Taksin the Great) held a boxing contest in the city of Tak during a traditional festival, Thong Di, then twenty years old, requested a match. Despite being an unknown, he insisted on fighting the most skillful boxer in town.

He faced Nai Hao, a famous boxing master whom no one dared to challenge. Thong Di displayed brilliant style and achieved a resounding victory. Witnessing this, Phraya Tak immediately asked Thong Di to join his army and appointed him as his personal bodyguard.

=== Military Leadership ===
Between 1765 and 1769, during the Sino-Burmese War (1765–1769), the Burmese were forced to withdraw the bulk of their garrison from Siam to face Chinese invasions. Phraya Tak took advantage of this situation, organizing an army to drive back the remaining Burmese forces.

During this war of independence, Thong Di served as a Commander-in-Chief. In 1773, a Burmese army under Ne Myo Thihapate attempted to capture Phichai. Thong Di led the Siamese forces, supported by Chao Phraya Surasi, and successfully repelled the Burmese at Wat Aka, inflicting heavy casualties.

=== The "Broken Sword" Legend ===
During a fierce battle, Thong Di fought with daab song mue (two-handed swords). After many engagements, he slipped and used one of his swords to steady himself by pointing it into the ground; as he leaned on it, the blade broke in half. Undeterred, he continued to lead his army to victory using one whole sword and one broken one. This feat earned him the name Phraya Phichai Dap Hak.

== Death and legacy ==
Following the transition from the Thonburi Kingdom to the Rattanakosin Kingdom in 1782, King Rama I (Phra Phutthayotfa Chulalok) ascended the throne. Recognizing Phraya Phichai's exceptional military merit and integrity, the new King offered to grant him a royal pardon and invited him to continue his service as a high-ranking officer in the new administration.

However, Phraya Phichai, a staunchly loyal subject of the late King Taksin, declined the offer. Adhering to the ancient code of loyalty known as Kha Kao Chao Liang (ข้าเก่าเจ้าเลี้ยง), which dictated that a loyal servant should not serve two masters, he requested his own execution to follow King Taksin in death. Before his death, he entrusted his son, Nai Ket (นายเกต), to the care of King Rama I. Phraya Phichai was executed on 7 April 1782 at the age of 41.

=== Descendants and influence ===
His son, Nai Ket, later served under King Rama I and eventually rose to the rank of Phraya Phichai, carrying on his father's title and legacy in the Rattanakosin period. The lineage of Phraya Phichai is recognized as one of the historic families of Uttaradit.

=== Memorials ===
In 1969, the Thai government commissioned a bronze monument to honor Phraya Phichai. The statue stands in front of the Uttaradit Provincial Hall, depicting the hero in a dynamic combat stance with his iconic broken sword. The monument was officially unveiled by King Bhumibol Adulyadej (Rama IX) on 20 February 1969. The epitaph inscribed on the base serves as a reminder of his supreme loyalty and courage, stating: "In memory and loving honor for the pride of our nation."

== In popular culture ==
- Portrayed by Surachai Looksurin in the 1955 Thai film Taharn Suea Phra Chao Tak
- Portrayed by Suriyan Patipat in the 1984 CH3 TV drama Taharn Suea Phra Chao Tak
- Portrayed by Praptpadol Suwanbang in the 2004 Thai film The Lord of Ayuthaya
- Portrayed by Vacharakiat Boonphakdee in the 2004 CH7 TV drama Fa Mai
- Portrayed by Charun Ngamdee in the 2004 Thai film Phraya Pichai Dap Hak
- Portrayed by Napatsakorn Mitr-em in the 2007 CH3 TV drama Taksin Maharat
- Portrayed by Atthawut Keesiri in the 2007 Thai film Soldier of King Siam
- Portrayed by Danny Mo in the 2015 Thai film Siam Yuth The Dawn of the Kingdom
- Portrayed by Buakaw Banchamek in the 2017 Thai film Thong Dee Fun Khao
- Portrayed by Chalad Na Songkhla in the 2017 CH8 TV drama The Legend of Siam Hero
- Portrayed by Jirayu Tantrakul in the 2018 CH3HD TV drama Nueng Dao Fa Diao
- Portrayed by Weerawut Khemkhaeng in the 2018 CH7HD TV drama Sai Lohit

== See also ==
- Burmese–Siamese wars
- Thonburi Kingdom
- King Taksin the Great
