= CJ Major Entertainment =

South Korean-Thai film production company

CJ Major Entertainment is a South Korean–Thai film production company based in Thailand. It was established in 2016 as a joint venture between South Korean media company CJ E&M (owner of the studio CJ Entertainment), which owns a 49-percent stake, and Major Cineplex Group, Thailand's largest cinema chain, which owns 51 percent in the venture. The partnership is part of CJ Entertainment's strategy of partnering with local companies to produce works from Korean source materials localised for regional audiences. Yeonu Choi serves as CJ Major's managing director and chief producer.

== Filmography ==
As of 2020, CJ Major has released four feature titles:

- Suddenly Twenty (2016) – Directed by Araya Suriharn, a remake of Miss Granny (2014)
- Love Battle (2019) – Directed by Wirat Hengkongdee, based on a story by South Korean writers
- Dew (2019) – Directed by Chookiat Sakveerakul, a remake of Bungee Jumping of Their Own (2001)
- Classic Again (2020) – Directed by Thatchaphong Suphasri, a remake of The Classic (2003)
