= Laplae the Hidden Town =

- Genre: Drama; Fantasy; History; Mystery; Romance
- Written by: Jarunun Phantachat; Minta Bhanaparin; Pimpanida Phanmai
- Directed by: Chartchai Ketnust; Yaowalak Mekkulviroj
- Starring: Piyathida Mittiraroch; Piangfah Yaganegi; Patharawarin Timkul; Malimarisar hughes; Phatphaibun Ophatsuwan; Sadanont Durongkavarojana
- Composers: Jetsada Hongcharoen; Nattapak Kaweethammwong
- Country of origin: Thailand
- Original language: Thai
- No. of episodes: 20

Production
- Running time: 42–45 minutes
- Production company: Magenta Media Creation

Original release
- Network: Workpoint TV
- Release: 31 August – 3 November 2024

Laplae the Hidden Town (Thai: เมืองลับแล) is a Thai drama series. First broadcast on Workpoint TV.

== Synopsis ==
Two female friends of Lap Lae were sent out to hunt men for reproducing the daughters back to become citizens of the town. However, they found that men and the outside world were not as evil as they had been taught. They fell in love during the mission. Meanwhile, there was a rebellion in the town to overthrow the power of the old town governor. Thus, it was difficult for both of them to decide which party they should go back to help because all parties claim that what their own parties did was ‘‘goodness’’.

== Cast ==
- Piyathida Mittiraroch as Bua
- Piangfah Yaganegi as Sompho
- Patharawarin Timkul as Angkab / Anchan
- Malimarisar Hughes as Kala
- Naphatsaran Mittiraroch as Mit
- Phatphaibun Ophatsuwan as Chan
- Sadanont Durongkavarojana as Min
- Pijika Jittaputta as Phutson
- Narinthorn Na Bangchang as Boonnak
- Kwanruean Lohakat as Uengphueng

=== Supporting ===
- Preya Wongrabeb as Bunga
- Satida Sripromma as Yihup
- Venus Saksiri as Gorya
- Natthawadi Kanchanophas as Songpeeb
- Wiracha Thapanangkunkon as Chaba
- Yatawee Janthron as Ramphoei
- Sasipat Chakrianan as Somsuk
- Supathida Madison as Dokfai
- Phitchaphong Nakhayuenyongsuk as Jai
- Whatthanapon Nilwet as Um
- Tanawat Cheawaram as Yao
- Kampanat Rueangkittiwilas as Mute Woman
- Marius Robin Schroeter as Henry
- Jidapa Phonrojpanya as Fueangfa
- Nutrugee Wisawanart as Young Bua

== Original soundtrack ==
- "Lap Lae" (ลับแล), opening theme by Pijika Jittaputta
- "Sai Lom Thi Phat Phan" (สายลมที่พัดผ่าน), ending theme by Malimarisar hughes
- "Rue Khae Phap Luang" (หรือแค่ภาพลวง), theme by Phatphaibun Ophatsuwan
- "Ka Bot Mueang Lap Lae" (กบฏเมืองลับแล), ending theme by Malimarisar hughes
