= Golden Eagle (film) =

Insee Thong
- Thai theatrical poster.
- Directed by: Mitr Chaibancha
- Story by: Sek Dusit
- Produced by: Mitr Chaibancha
- Starring: Mitr Chaibancha; Petchara Chaowarat
- Release date: November 12, 1970
- Running time: 104 min.
- Country: Thailand
- Language: Thai

Golden Eagle (Thai: อินทรีทอง, Insee Thong) is a 1970 Thai action film starring Mitr Chaibancha and Petchara Chaowarat. Chaibancha died while filming the stunt for the final scene in the film.

== Plot ==
Rom Ritthikrai (Mitr Chaibancha) is at a nightclub getting very drunk and trying to persuade others to join him in his fun. He is retrieved by his faithful assistant Oy (Petchara Chaowarat). Rom is actually the masked crimefighter Insee Daeng, or Red Eagle, and he uses the persona as a fun-loving drunkard to cover up his true identity.

However, an impostor Insee Daeng (Kanchit Kwanpracha) is committing murders, so Rom must change his masked alias to another color, and he becomes the Golden Eagle, or Insee Thong.

The impostor Red Eagle is connected to the Red Bamboo gang, which is trying to seize control of the Thai government. The Red Bamboos are led by Bakin (Ob Boontid), who was trained in hypnotism by Rasputin and is able to kill his intended targets by beaming his thoughts and visage through red ceramic Buddha statues, which are being delivered to various Thai officials. Bakin can also split himself into three images, making it impossible for gunmen to shoot him.

Disguised as the Golden Eagle, Rom sneaks into the Red Bamboo gang's house and discovers that the daughter of an admiral is being held hostage.

A police detective, meanwhile, is investigating his own angle on the case, going undercover as a transvestite to infiltrate a ring of transvestite Red Bamboos. A case of mistaken identities causes the policeman and the Golden Eagle to get into a fight.

The plot comes to a climax on an island in the Gulf of Thailand, with the police racing in on boats to attack a Red Bamboo stronghold. The Golden Eagle, after defeating his enemies, takes hold of a rope ladder on a helicopter and is carried aloft into the sunset in true action hero style.

== Production and Mitr's death ==
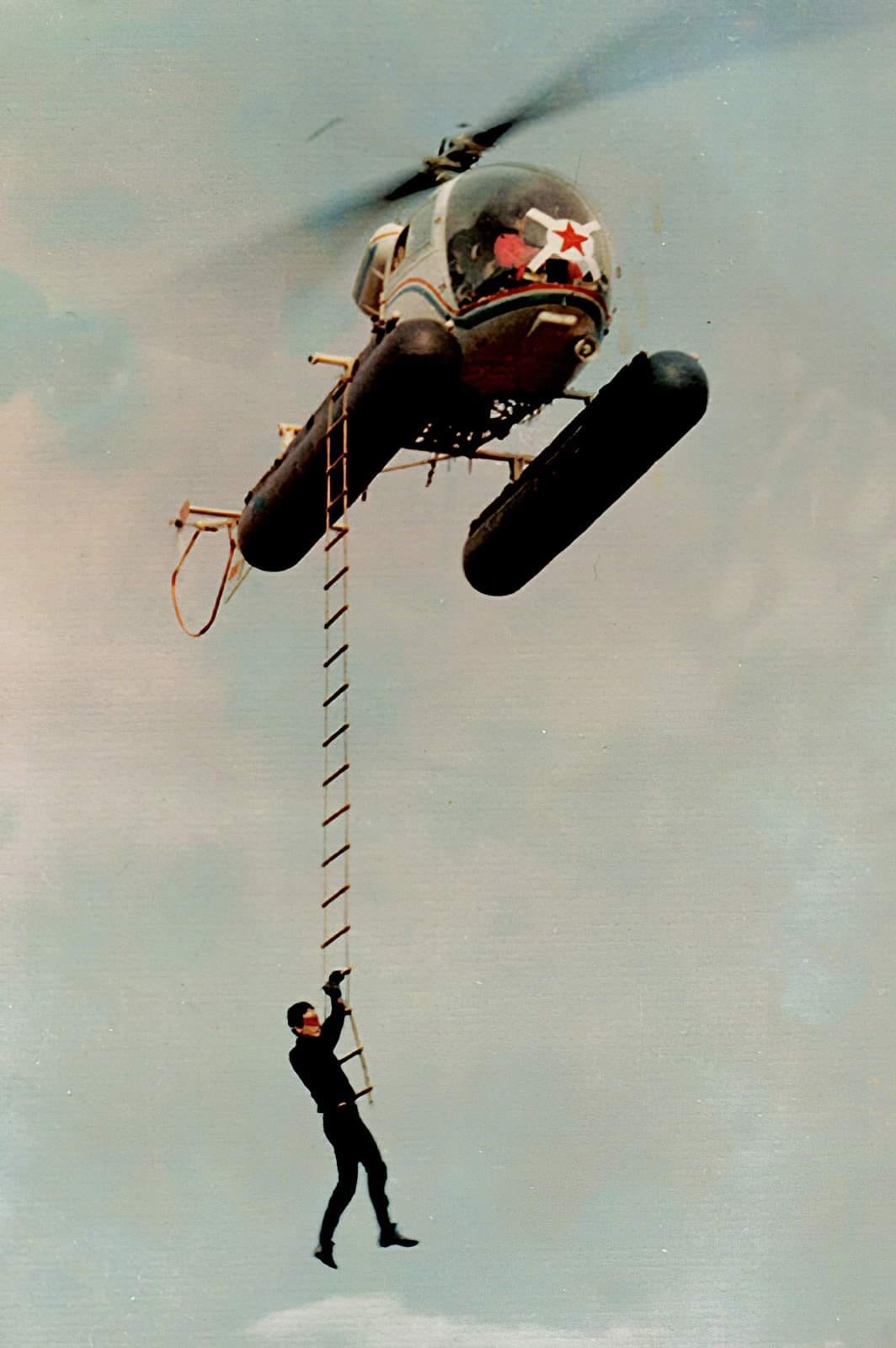
Filming of the helicopter scene, moments before Mitr Chaibancha's death

Insee Thong was the first and only film Mitr produced himself.

On the last day of shooting, the script called for Mitr, having vanquished the villains, to fly off into the sunset in a helicopter. As the camera rolled, Mitr leapt from the ground to grab a rope ladder hanging from the aircraft, only managing to reach the lowest rung. Unaware of this, the helicopter pilot flew higher, which led to Mitr losing his grip and falling to his death. The accident was caught on film and was even left in the final theatrical release. The fatal fall has since been removed from DVD versions of the film, with Mitr simply flying off into the distance and some onscreen text paying tribute to him.

Mitr's death was ruled an accident. For safety, there should have been two shots for the final scene. The first would have been of Mitr grabbing the ladder and flying off at low altitude. Then, a stunt double would have performed a second shot at a higher altitude.

== DVD release ==
Insee Thong was released on DVD in Thailand in 2005. The English-subtitled DVD contains a music video, photo gallery and footage from Mitr Chaibancha's cremation ceremony.

== Remake ==
In 2010, a remake of this film named The Red Eagle was directed by Wisit Sasanatieng.
