= Best of Times (2009 film) =

- International poster
- Directed by: Yongyoot Thongkongtoon
- Screenplay by: Nontra Kumwong; Aummaraporn Phandintong; Vanridee Pongsittisak
- Produced by: Chenchonnee Soonthonsaratul; Suwimol Techasupinan; Yongyoot Thongkongtoon
- Starring: Arak Amornsupasiri; Yarinda Bunnag; Krissana Sreadthatamrong; Sansanee Wattananukul
- Cinematography: Somboon Phopitakkul
- Edited by: Pan Busabaan
- Music by: Therdsak Chanpan
- Production company: GTH
- Release date: 5 March 2009 (Thailand)
- Running time: 117 minutes
- Country: Thailand
- Language: Thai
- Box office: $1.4 million

Best of Times (Thai: ความจำสั้น แต่รักฉันยาว, RTGS: Khwam Cham San Tae Rak Chan Yao) is a Thai romantic drama film directed by Yongyoot Thongkongtoon and released by GTH in 2009. It stars Arak Amornsupasiri, Yarinda Bunnag, Krissana Sreadthatamrong and Sansanee Wattananukul.

The film follows a young veterinarian who, while teaching computer classes to a group of seniors as part of a community service sentence, comes to know an elderly couple who are rediscovering romance late in life. He eventually learns from them and reconnects with his former school crush. The film received multiple national awards and was Thailand's submission to the 82nd Academy Award for Best Foreign Language Film.

== Plot ==
Two high school friends, Keng and Ohm, recorded a love song into a CD. Ohm asked about the girl Keng intended to send it to, but Keng refused to answer. Keng gathered his courage and sent this CD to the girl (Fai) at their cram school, who turned him down as she already had a boyfriend. Fai’s boyfriend turned out to be Ohm, who was completely clueless about his friend’s crush on Fai. Keng sadly kept this a secret and moved on.

In the present, Keng is an owner of his veterinarian clinic, and Ohm has been married to Fai who works as a nurseryman. After their high school reunion party, Ohm reveals to Keng that Fai discovered his affair with another woman and they are getting divorced. Both intoxicated men drive into a police’s DUI checkpoint, but they are sentenced to community services instead after Fai bails them out. On their way back, Fai finds a wounded stray dog on the street and the trio bring it to Keng’s clinic. Fai stays with the dog overnight while Ohm is seen calling his new girlfriend to inform her about his situations, and Fai is visibly saddened.

Keng is assigned by the court to teach computer classes to a group of elderly people. He befriends two students: a slick but kind-hearted Jamrus and a sweet lady Sompit. Keng is teaching the class how to use MSN Messenger, which Jamrus is openly skeptical at as he finds talking face-to-face easier. Sompit, in contrast, writes all the steps into her notebook, reasoning that this program can allow them to communicate from far away, and taking notes is her way to memorize things. After the class, Jamrus misplaces his car key and Keng offers to drive him and Sompit home.

Keng is surprised that Jamrus and Sompit are in fact not husband and wife, although they are both widowed. Jamrus is a farm owner who drives six hours from Chumphon to Bangkok every weekend to meet Sompit in their class, where students are aware of their romance. Jamrus asks Sompit to visit his farm in Chumphon, where he is proud of his Malay rose apple garden. Sompit happily agrees after going on a date with Jamrus, but her son (Krit) does not welcome Jamrus upon learning about his mother’s newfound romance in her old age.

Meanwhile, Fai adopts the wounded dog they found earlier and names it Saphan-Loi (“bridge”). Fai visits Keng’s clinic again with posters of Saphan-Loi in hope to find its owner. Their reunion makes Fai realize that Keng is in fact a boy who gave her a love song CD years ago, linking his signature on the CD’s cover and his medical gown. Fai still remembers Keng, but he pretends to only meet her two years prior when he was Ohm’s best man. Keng is secretly happy about Fai’s return into his life, but she still remains a close friend with Ohm despite their divorce. Fai later looks at Ohm’s Hi5 page, where he posted pictures of him and his new girlfriend’s family, hinting a serious relationship.

Jamrus comes to pick Sompit at her house in one early morning. Keng later lies to Krit, who is worried about his mother’s absence, that his computer class is going to Chumphon as a retreat. Keng then decides to confront Sompit about her situations, and Fai offers to drive Keng to Chumphon. Upon arrival, Jamrus asks them to spend a few days at his place. At dinner time, Jamrus goes out to gather some wild betel leaves for his dish, and Keng has a conversation with Sompit about her son. Sompit then reveals that Krit and her daughter-in-law are moving the family to United States soon, much to her dismay. She accepts Jamrus’s invitation as she might have to leave Thailand for good. Meanwhile, Jamrus experiences a sudden memory loss in his farm and cannot remember his way back until much later, worrying everyone.

Next morning, Jamrus recalls the story to the group: a typhoon Gay hit Chumphon in 1989, destroying his entire farm except an old Malay rose apple tree. Since then, he has cherished this tree like a family member as it reminds him never to give up. Alone, Sompit tells Jamrus about her soon departure to United States with her family. Jamrus then proposes to Sompit under this tall tree, and she tearfully accepts and expresses her desire to be with him.

Keng and Fai later take a fishing trip at night, where they get drunk and talk about old days. Keng reveals that after knowing her relationship with Ohm, he transferred his classes in the cram school to avoid them, and never saw Fai again until her wedding. Fai promptly calls Ohm, infuriatingly and drunkenly venting how he has destroyed her life. Fai then kisses Keng, who confesses that she is his first love and he in fact never forgets her. Fai does not reciprocate, and apologizes for her impulsive act.

Keng, Fai, and Sompit drive back to Bangkok the next day. Krit is very upset with his mother’s action, while she pleas to remain in Thailand. Krit sadly claims that she loves Jamrus more than their family, and Sompit apologizes and embraces them tearfully. Meanwhile, Ohm and Keng finish their DUI probation, and Keng decides to confess to Ohm about Fai. Ohm casually dismisses Keng’s confession and claims that he is getting married again. Ohm also states that while he admits his mistakes, Fai is not the right person for him, as she is more like a fun buddy than spouse.

Jamrus misses his date with Sompit one day, and he is found at the gas station, experiencing a worsening memory loss. He is taken to a hospital, and a doctor informs his family, Keng, and Sompit that Jamrus is having Alzheimer’s disease, explaining his forgetful nature. Jamrus playfully remains cool, but Sompit can see his deteriorating condition when he forgets his coffee routine. Jamrus’s adult son decides to sell his farm in Chumphon so his father can be under his care, making Jamrus upset and tries to go back to Chumphon himself.

Despite their now awkward relationship, Keng and Fai want to move Jamrus’s cherished Malay rose apple tree from Chumphon to Bangkok for him as a keepsake. Fai worries that the tree may die as it is very old, but ultimately decides to carry on. The tree is then planted in Jamrus’s new home, to his amazement. Sompit comes to bid farewell, and Jamrus comforts her that it is better to part while their memories of each other are still clear. They tearfully say goodbye and Sompit moves to United States soon after.

Keng and Fai eventually accept and move on with their relationship, and they decide to keep Saphan-Loi as their own pet. Jamrus finds Sompit’s notebook from their computer class with instructions of how to use MSN Messenger, and signs in to connect with her to United States. They happily rekindle their relationship. Jamrus also sends a file via MSN Messenger to Keng and Fai: a picture of his Malay rose apple tree, sprouting again in his new home.

== Cast ==
- Arak Amornsupasiri as Keng
- Yarinda Bunnag as Fai
- Krissana Sreadthatamrong as Jamrus
- Sansanee Wattananukul as Sompi
- James Alexander Mackie as Ohm

== Reception ==
The film topped the domestic boxoffice for a while and grossed $1.4 million in Bangkok. It received two awards for Outstanding Performance by an Actress in a Supporting Role (Sansanee Wattananukul) and Best Original Song (So I Won't Forget You), and four nominations for Best Picture of the Year, Best Director of the Year (Yongyoot Thongkongtoon), Outstanding Performance by an Actor in a Supporting Role (Krissana Sreadthatamrong), and Screenplay of the Year in the 19th Suphannahong National Film Awards .

== Soundtrack ==
- "จะได้ไม่ลืมกัน" (lit. So I Won't Forget You) by Bird Thongchai McIntyre
