= Good Morning, Luang Prabang =

- Theatrical release poster
- Directed by: Sakchai Deenan
- Produced by: Anousone Sirisackda
- Starring: Ananda Everingham; Khamly Philavong
- Release date: June 5, 2008
- Running time: 90 minutes
- Countries: Laos; Thailand
- Languages: Lao; Thai

Good Morning, Luang Prabang (Thai: สะบายดี หลวงพะบาง, Sabaidee Luang Prabang) is a 2008 romantic drama film directed by Sakchai Deenan and starring Ananda Everingham and Khamly Philavong. It was the first commercial film shot in Laos since the country adopted communism in 1975.

== Plot ==
Sorn (Everingham), a Thai photographer visiting Laos, falls in love with his beautiful Laotian tour guide, Noi (Philawong). The film features several tourist sites in Laos.

== Cast ==
- Ananda Everingham as Sorn
- Khamly Philawong as Noi

== Production ==
Director Sakchai Deenan claimed the plotline was inspired by a visit to Laos in which he fell in love with a Laotian woman and imagining her as a tour guide. He deliberately created a simple plot "so it would not be too hard to get approval from the Lao government." Previously, the only Laotian films were propaganda and patriotism related, produced by the government. A government member oversaw the production of Sabaidee Luang Prabang so that it portrayed Laotian culture in a positive manner and cut any scenes that the Lao government may perceive to be controversial.

== Release ==
The film premiered on May 24, 2008, at one of Laos' two theaters (both located in its capital, Vientiane) and was released in Thai on June 5. Open-air screenings occurred throughout Laos, including the UNESCO World Heritage city of Luang Prabang. Upon its release, it was the first Laotian private film, authorities seeing Sabaidee Luang Prabang as the start of a new source of income. The aim of the film was also to encourage bilateral cooperation between Thailand and Laos.
