= Me... Myself =

- Movie poster
- Directed by: Pongpat Wachirabunjong
- Screenplay by: Kongdej Jaturanrasamee
- Story by: Pongpat Wachirabunjong
- Produced by: Thanya Wachirabunjong; Piyaluck Mahatanasab
- Starring: Ananda Everingham; Chayanan Manomaisantiphap
- Cinematography: Sayombhu Mukdeeprom
- Edited by: Sunit Asvinikul; Muanfun Uppatham
- Music by: Hualumpong Riddim; Vichaya Vatanasapt
- Distributed by: Mono Film
- Release date: 19 April 2007
- Running time: 110 minutes
- Country: Thailand
- Language: Thai
- Box office: $1,054,666

Me... Myself (Thai: ขอให้รักจงเจริญ) or Khaw hai rak jong jaroen) is a 2007 Thai romance drama film directed by Pongpat Wachirabunjong. Ananda Everingham stars as a gay male dancer in a transvestite cabaret who has amnesia after being struck by a car.

== Plot ==
A man is robbed while making a call in a phone booth. Staggering in the middle of the road from the beating by the thieves, he is then struck by a car driving by a woman named Oom. Feeling sorry for him, Oom brings the man to her apartment and gives him shelter. The man, it turns out, has developed amnesia. Based the name on a pendant the man is wearing – his only possession – Oom names him Tan. A doctor's examination reveals that Tan is uninjured except that he can't remember anything about his life prior to being struck by Oom's car. Tan is given a journal and urged to free associate in an effort to recall his past life.

Oom is experiencing trouble in her own life. She has recently broken up with her domineering boyfriend, Krit, whom she still sees at her workplace, where she is a creative director for an advertising agency. Oom has also had motherhood thrust upon her, since she is caring for her nephew, the son of her dead sister.

Initially, having Tan around adds stress to the situation, and when Tan reorganizes her stacks of magazines, and interferes in her disciplining of Ohm, she is angry.

But Tan proves useful around the apartment. He is looked up to as a father figure by Ohm. And for Oom, he builds up the self-esteem and confidence she lost in her relationship with Krit. Tan seems to instinctively know things about femininity, such as what dress Oom should wear and what shade of lipstick is appropriate. As a family unit with Oom and Ohm, Tan goes to an amusement park and defends Oom after he gets in trouble for fighting in school, with the result being Tan getting punched by the other boy's father.

While visions of his past nag him, Tan seems perfectly happy with Oom and Ohm, especially after he becomes romantically involved with Oom. "I don't want to remember anymore. I want to be like this with you here, forever," he tells Oom one night as they watch the sunset from a ledge outside her apartment.

Eventually the memories of the past catch up with Tan. Taking some numbers he wrote in his journal, he retraces his steps to the scene of the car accident, and eventually finds the numbers are an address to a house. The home belongs to a man whom Tan had a homosexual relationship with, but since the man is married to a woman and has a family, he must keep the relationship secret.

Meanwhile, the police call Oom. They have some items recovered from the thieves who attacked Tan on the night he was struck by her car. Among the items is a mobile phone. The police have already called the number, and Tan's friends from Phuket on their way to Bangkok to claim the phone and find out more about their missing friend. The friends, it turns out, are all katoey dancers in a transvestite cabaret, where Tan was the star attraction.

== Cast ==
- Ananda Everingham as Tan/Tanya
- Chayanan Manomaisantiphap as Oom
- Monton Arnupabmard as Ohm
- Puttachat Pongsuchat as Boss Oil
- Piya Vimuktayon as Krit
- Direk Amatayakul as Dr. Kriangkrai
- Maria Dissayanand as Dr. Maria
- Pratanporn Phuwadolpitak as Neighbor across the hall
- Pornpisit Somchatvong as Neighbor across the hall
- Tanit Jitnukul as Police sergeant (cameo)
- Andrew James Legon as tourist (cameo)
- Hannah 'Tingtong' Worthington as lead tourist (cameo)

== Release ==
=== Festivals and awards ===
Me ... Myself was featured in the Thai Panorama program at the 2007 Bangkok International Film Festival. It was screened at the 38th International Film Festival of India, where Pongpat Wachirabunjong won a Silver Peacock award for "most promising director".
