= Mon Rak Luk Thung =

- Thai theatrical poster
- Directed by: Rungsri Tassanapuk
- Starring: Mitr Chaibancha; Petchara Chaowarat
- Release date: 15 May 1970
- Running time: 146 minutes
- Country: Thailand
- Language: Thai

Mon Rak Luk Thung (Thai: มนต์รักลูกทุ่ง, or Magical Love in the Countryside or Wonder of Luk Thung) is a 1970 musical-comedy-romance film directed by Rungsri Tassanapuk and starring Mitr Chaibancha and Petchara Chaowarat. Released on May 15, 1970, the film was a hit, playing in Thai cinemas for six months.

It featured a hit soundtrack with 14 luk thung (Thai country-folk music) songs that rhapsodize rural life in northeast Thailand. The story is about the romance between a peasant man (Mitr), and a young woman (Petchara) from a wealthy family.

The film was remade in 2005, with the English title Sounds from the Field of Love. It was also adapted in a hit 1990s Thai television series.

== Synopsis ==
In 1970, Clark (Mitr Chaibancha) falls for Thong Kwao (Petchara Chaowarat). Clark promises that if he can sell his rice, he will propose to Thong Kwao.

However, Clark's land gets seized because of his debt to Chom Thong. Thong Kwao is sent to live with her aunt in Bangkok.

Thong Kwao is introduced to Thammarak in hopes that they should marry. Clark wants to come propose, but Thong Kwao's parents want a steep payment for him to do so. As a result of him not being present, Thong Khao agrees to Thammarak’s proposal. However, it is discovered Thammarak already has a wife, Rue.

Thong Kwao is captured and held for ransom. Clark, along with the police, saves her. He acquires gold pieces, which Thong's father and mother finally accept. The couple marries.

== Film, TV or theatrical adaptations ==
The film was remade in 1982 and 2005, It was also adapted in a hit 1990s Thai TV series.

- Monrak luk thung (1970) - starring Mitr Chaibancha and Petchara Chaowarat
- Monrak luk thung (1982) - starring Toon Hiranyasap and Umpa Pusit
- Monrak luk thung (1995) - TV series starring Saranyoo Wongkrachang
- The Music of Love (2005) - TV series starring Natthawut Skidjai and Suvanant Kongying
- Sounds from the Field of Love (2005) - starring Nanthawat Asirapojanakul and Apaporn Nakornsawan
- Magical Love in the Countryside (2010) - TV series starring Tisadee Sahawong and Jittapa Jampatom
- Love You 100K (2015) - starring New Chaiyapol and Praew Chermawee
- Falling in Love (2024) - TV series starring Mew Suppasit and Charlotte Austin
