= Sadanont Durongkavarojana =

Thai actor (born 2000)

Sadanon Durongkaveroj
- ศดานนท์ ดุรงคเวโรจน์
- Born: 6 October 2000 (age 25); Bangkok, Thailand
- Other name: Nont
- Education: Bangkok University; School of Digital Media and Cinematic Arts
- Occupation: Actor
- Years active: 2018–present
- Known for: Phop in Dew

Sadanont Durongkavarojana (Thai: ศดานนท์ ดุรงคเวโรจน์; Thai pronunciation: [sa.dāː.nōn dū.rōŋ.kʰā.wēː.rôːt]; also known as Nont (Thai: นนท์), born 6 October 2000) is a Thai actor. He is known for his main role as Phop in the film Dew (2019).

== Early life and education ==
Sadanont was born in Bangkok, Thailand. He completed his secondary education at Bangkok Christian College. He earned a bachelor's degree in the School of Digital Media and Cinematic Arts at Bangkok University.

== Career ==
Sadanont started appearing in several music videos such as "คือเธอใช่ไหม" (Keu Tur Chai Mai) by Getsunova and Tai Orathai, and "วังวน" (LOOP) by ONEONE.

He starred in the Thai romantic movie Dew, his first film, where he played the main role of Phop and was part of Bad Genius, a television series remake of the 2017 Thai film Bad Genius.

== Filmography ==
=== Film ===
Year	Title	Role	Notes	Ref.
2019	Dew	Phop	Main Role	
2021	The Whole Truth	Fame	Support Role	
2022	SLR	Great	Main Role	
2023	Long Live Love	Jensanam	Support Role	
2025	Frozen Hot Boys	Joe	Support Role	
2025	Love or Lie	Yo	Main Role	
2025	Tee Yai: Born to Be Bad	Kid	Support Role	
2026	The De4d Echoes	Bird	Main Role (Threesome segment)	

=== Television ===
Year	Title	Role	Notes	Ref.
2020	Bad Genius	Tong	Support Role	
2021	Girl from Nowhere Season 2	Jeng	Episode: "Pregnant"	
2021	#HATETAG	Kao	Episode 3: "#Cowboy1"; Episode 4: "#Cowboy2"	
2023	23:23	Wat	Guest Role	
2023	Get Rich	Boo	Main Role	
2024	Laplae the Hidden Town	Min	Main Role	
2025	How to Suffer 101	Kla	Main Role	
2025	Zomvivor	"Joe" Chaiwut Kiatphiphat	Guest Role	
2026	Love Upon a Time	Cherd	Support Role	

=== Music video appearances ===
Year	Song title	Artist(s)	Ref.
2019	"ช้าไป" (Chaa Bpai)	NAP A LEAN	
2019	"School of รัก" (School of Rak)	NAP A LEAN	
2019	"เสียงขอร้องของคนเสียใจ" (Siang Kaw Rawng Kawng Kon Sia Jai)	Dome Pakorn Lum	
2019	"คือเธอใช่ไหม" (Keu Tur Chai Mai)	Getsunova, Tai Orathai	
2019	"Chocolate"	PLASUI PLASUI	
2019	"วังวน" (LOOP)	ONEONE	
2019	"โลกทั้งใบ" (The One)	Pang Pattanan	
2020	"ไม่เป็นไร" (Mai Bpen Rai)	LingRom	
2020	"อีกครั้ง" (Once)	loserpop	
2020	"คิดว่าลืมได้ (แต่ไม่ลืม)" (On this day)	Aueyauey	
2020	"เรื่องราว" (Ours)	Topeople	
2021	"เธอเก่งที่สุดในโลก ;)" (Person of the Year)	imnutt	
2022	"ไม่เป็นไรหรอกมั้ง" (It's Probably Okay)	Only Monday	
2023	"ตอนเธอหลับ" (When You Sleep)	mints	
2023	"ให้เธอรู้ (Beside)" (Let Her Know)	FREEHAND	
2024	"ไม่ไหวก็ทิ้งได้เลย" (If You Can't Handle It, Just Leave)	INDIGO	
2025	"คิดถึงไม่ไหว (Dream)" (I Miss You So Much)	GAVIN:D	

== Awards and nominations ==
Year	Nominated work	Category	Award	Result	Ref.
2020	Dew	Best Supporting Actor	Kom Chad Luek Awards	Won	
2020	Dew	Best Actor	Starpics Thai Films Awards	Won	
2020	Dew	Best Actor	Bangkok Critics Assembly Awards	Won	
2021	Dew	Best Actor	Suphannahong National Film Awards	Won	
