= 303 Fear Faith Revenge =

- Thai Film Poster
- Directed by: Somching Srisupap
- Written by: Cher Kori
- Produced by: Visute Poolvoralaks
- Starring: Taya Rogers; Ananda Everingham; Arthit Ryu
- Cinematography: Taweesak Kumphati
- Edited by: Mahasak Tassanapayak
- Distributed by: Tai Entertainment
- Release date: 1998
- Running time: 90 minutes
- Country: Thailand
- Language: Thai

303 Fear Faith Revenge (Thai: 303 กลัว/กล้า/อาฆาต, RTGS: 303 Klua/Kla/Akhat) is a 1998 Thai slasher film starring Taya Rogers, Arthit Ryu, and Ananda Everingham. In this film, an investigation into a star student's suicide results in several students being stranded in their closed school where they are hunted and killed one by one.

== Plot ==
In 1960, five teenagers began their new journey as students in St. George Catholic School. Chaidan (“Chai”) — a scholarship-funded boy originated from northern part of Thailand; Ghulsolsang (“Ghul”) — an avid photographer, searching for freedom; Sihnsamuth (“Sihn”) — sensitive and allergic; Pongketh ("Pong") — a good-looking student; and Traisoon (“Trai”) — who sees this school as a platform for him seeking popularity and becoming influential figure.

The freshies came from different backgrounds: from a wealthy family, a politician family, and a famous family; son of a military officer, a high rank officer, a civil servant, and a school alumnus.

The boys began flourished attraction with a picture of Prince Daovadueng Sila, an alumnus whose come with reputable as excellent student but raised a question why only a young picture of him was displayed. They began to dig for more information about him from the school's yearbook of 1952. They found out he was dead by suicide.

Unsatisfied with the limited resources, they began investigate the real reason behind the pronounce-suicide. Even Mr Choo, the long servant school janitor claimed that he had shot himself. The boys befriended Numkang, the daughter of fierce Mr Sawaeng ("Waeng"), the school bad-tempered teacher. Father Theodore also stated that Prince Daovadueng committed suicide.

One night they decided to use a Ouija board with inclusion of Numkang, who admired the late prince. By hailing the spirit of Prince Daovadueng and ask him about the actual reason behind his death, the cause of his death was not suicide, instead he had been murdered. Without their knowledge, the broken planchette releases the spirit of Chatta, the evil spirit of a boy who had been bullied, mentally and physically by his school mates.

Possessed-Sihnsamuth begins ignoring the investigations and shows no further interest. He also pursues them to abandon the research. One night after sneaking out to meet Numkang, Trai climbs to a hostel dorm and tries to get in through the bedroom window with help of a stranger's hand, before slipping and falling to his death. Chai and Ghu wonder why in the 1952 registration book, out of 116 admission there were no record of Daovadeung and other students, only 110 of them are listed. Although in the school's hall of fame, Daovadeung was dubbed as one of the school's best student.

Chatta possesses the body of weak Sihnsamuth to kill all the seniors that treat other students badly, electrocuting Tee and violently stabbing Joe with axe. In a flashback it is revealed that Chatta also killed his schoolmates by shooting randomly and Daovadeung was one of them. He dug graves to bury them but was found out by Mr Choo and before being captured, he shot himself.

Possessed Sihnsamuth accuses his friends of being murderers and practicing black magic. Afterwards, he kills the seniors and a female teacher. That night, father Theodore recalled his mistake for ignoring Chatta who pleaded of senior misconduct which led to his mental breakdown and eventually seeking revenge.

They finally save Numkang from being buried alive by Chatta/Sihnsamuth. They use St George spear from a statue and with help of Daovadeung's spirit their manage to kill Sihnsamuth possessed by Chatta. After the tragedy, Mr Choo makes a false confession before dying, taking all the blame. The wolfpack finish their school together with better tradition and friendly approached as senior. Father Theodore dies and Brother Vivad took his seat.

== Cast ==
- Arthit Ryu as Chaydan
- Ananda Everingham as Ghusolnsang
- Adam Shekleton as Reptilicant
- Taya Rogers as Numkang
- Paul Carey as Pongkhet
- Prinya Intachai as Traisoon
- Songwut Sricherdchutham as Sinsamuth
- Rerng-Rit Wisamon as Joe
- Chart-Yodom Hiranyadthiti as Tee
- Jesdaporn Pholdee as Prince Dowwaduang Sila
- Suchao Pongwilai as Father
- Micheal Pupart as Brother Wiwat
- Areewan Chatutong as Teacher Orasha
- Charlie Sungkawess as Mr. Swaeng (as Chalie Sang-Kawes)
- Apichat Choosakul as Mr. Choo
- Thanalarp Somprakop as Dej
- Chuchart Silpajarn as Cherd
