= Chart Suea =

1958 film

Chart Suea ชาติเสือ
- Directed by: Prateb Gomonpis
- Starring: Mitr Chaibancha; Rewadee Sewilai; Win Wunchai; Narmkern bunnuk Praphasee Satornkid; Naiyana TanomSub; Usanee Isaranun; NoppaMad Sirisopon; Punga Suttirin; Porn Paroch; Pramin Jarujarit; Sail Poonsai; Sompong pongmitr Sukon Kueawleam; Lortok
- Distributed by: Tussanai Films
- Release date: June 18, 1958
- Country: Thailand
- Language: Thai
- Box office: 800,000 baht.

Chart Suea (Thai: ชาติเสือ) is a Thai film based on a work by "Orawun" (lyu Sresawek). It was premièred on June 18, 1958, at Sala Chalermkrung Royal Theatre and Sala Chalermbure Royal Theatre. The film was directed by Prateb Gomonpis. It is a sequel to the 1956 film PraiKuarng.

The film was the screen debut of Mitr Chaibancha, as Wai Sukda, and stars Rewadee Sewilai, Win Wunchai, Narmkern bunnuk, Praphasee Satornkid, Naiyana TanomSub, Usanee Isaranun, NoppaMad Sirisopon, Punga Suttirin, Porn Paroch, Pramin Jarujarit, Sail Poonsai, Sompong pongmitr, Sukon Kueawleam and Lortok.

The film has grossed over 800,000 baht. The critical response was mostly favourable.
