= Ananda Everingham =

Thai actor and model (born 1982)

- อนันดา เอเวอริงแฮม
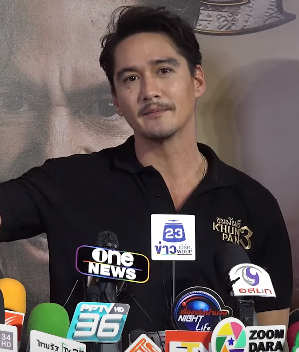
- Everingham in 2023
- Born: Ananda Matthew Everingham; 31 May 1982 (age 44); Bangkok, Thailand
- Occupations: Actor; model
- Years active: 1998–present
- Height: 6 ft 0 in (1.83 m)
- Partner(s): Nicha Thanalongkorn (2022–present; engaged)

Ananda Everingham (Thai: อนันดา เอเวอริงแฮม; born 31 May 1982) is a Thai actor and model. Working primarily in Thai films, he is best known for his lead role in the 2004 horror film, Shutter.

== Biography ==
Ananda Matthew Everingham is the son of a Laotian-born mother, Keo Sirisomphone and Australian father, Bangkok-based photojournalist John Everingham. He is of Lao and Australian descent.

His parents' story was loosely dramatised in the 1983 NBC television movie Love Is Forever, starring Michael Landon and Laura Gemser, which tells of a photojournalist who scuba dives under the Mekong River to rescue his lover from communist-ruled Laos in 1977. His parents divorced in 1997. John remarried a Chinese woman. Ananda has a brother and a half brother.

Ananda was born in Thailand and attended Bangkok Patana School. He holds Australian citizenship and visited Brisbane, Australia, on school holidays.

Aside from Shutter, Ananda has starred in the horror-comedy Ghost Delivery and the teen-slasher movie 303 Fear Faith Revenge. In 2005, he starred in the Singaporean romance film The Leap Years. Two years later, he played the lead roles in the romantic dramas Me... Myself and Bangkok Time. He had featured roles in the Singaporean film Pleasure Factory and in Pen-ek Ratanaruang's Ploy.

In 2008, he appeared not only in the Nonzee Nimibutr film Queen of Langkasuka but also in Sabaidee Luang Prabang, the first Laotian commercial film produced since Laos adopted communism in 1975.

== Filmography ==
=== Film ===
Year	Title	Role	Notes
1998	Anda kub Fahsai	Anda	Main role
1998	303 Fear Faith Revenge	Ghusolnsang	Main role
1999	The Brainstorm		Main role
2003	Kohn sang pea (Ghost Delivery)		Main role
2004	Shutter	Tun	Main role
2007	Bangkok Time		Main role
2007	Pleasure Factory	Chris	Main role
2007	Me Myself	Tan	Main role
2007	Ploy	Nut	Support role
2008	The Leap Years	Jeremy	Main role
2008	Memory	Krit	Main role
2008	Sabaidee Luang Prabang	Sorn	Main role
2008	The Coffin	Chris	Main role
2008	Queens of Langkasuka	Sea Gypsy Pari	Main role
2008	Happy Birthday	Ten	Main role
2009	Charming Bangkok	(segment "Bangkok Blues")	Main role
2010	The Red Eagle	Red Eagle/ Rome	Main role
2010	Hi-So	Ananda	Main role
2010	Chua Fah Din Salai	Sangmong	Main role
2012	Kalayaan	Julian	Philippine film
2012	Shambala	Tin	Main role
2013	The Library	Jim Arnothai	Thai short film
2014	Hong Hoon	Nop	Main role
2014	Sway	Palm	Main role
2014	Concrete Clouds	Mutt	Main role
2014	O.T. The Movie	Badin	Main role
2015	Love H2O	Ohm	Main role
2016	Khun Pan	Khun Pan	Main role
2018	7 Days	Kong	Main role
2018	Khun Pan 2	Khun Pan	Main role
2018	Reside	Dech	Main role
2021	Go Away, Mr. Tumor	Kawin	Main role
2023	Khun Phan 3	Khun Pan	Main role
2023	X-Treme Riders		Support role
2024	Pattaya Heat	Simon	Main role
2024	The Cursed Land	Mit	Main role
TBA
TBA	Kla Fan Plon Sanan Mueang	TBA	Support role
TBA	The Snake Queen	TBA	
TBA	Suppose	TBA	
2026	Delivery Man		

=== Television ===
Year	Title	Role	Notes	Channel
2002	Mahasajan Hang Rak	Don	Main role	Channel 7
2002	Khon Rerng Muang	Prem	Main role	Channel 5
2003	Talay Reu Im	Jao Poo Tawan	Main role	TITV
2006	Nai Fun	Prince Piriypong	Main role	Channel 9
2014	Full House (Thai version)	(Mike's producer)	Guest role	True4U
2015	Mafia Luerd Mungkorn: Suea	"Suea" Parob Rungrueangphaisansiri	Main role	Channel 3
2015	Mafia Luerd Mungkorn: Singh	"Suea" Parob Rungrueangphaisansiri	Support role	Channel 3
2015	Mafia Luerd Mungkorn: Krating	"Suea" Parob Rungrueangphaisansiri	Support role	Channel 3
2015	Mafia Luerd Mungkorn: Raed	"Suea" Parob Rungrueangphaisansiri	Support role	Channel 3
2015	Mafia Luerd Mungkorn: Hong	"Suea" Parob Rungrueangphaisansiri	Support role	Channel 3
2017	Sri Ayodhaya	Dr. Pimarn Katiyamongkol / Phra Pimarn Sathan Mongkol	Main role	True4U
2019	Secret Garden Thailand	Thanat	Main role	True4U
2019	Sri Ayodhaya 2	Dr. Pimarn Katiyamongkol / Phra Pimarn Sathan Mongkol	Main role	True4U
2021	XYZ	Thorn	Main role	True4U
2023	The Betrayal	Athin	Main role	Channel 3

== Awards and nominations ==
Awards
Year	Award	Category	Nominated Work	Result
2003	Star Entertainment Awards	Best Leading Actor	Shutter	Nominated
2006	Busan International Film Festival	Male Rising Star	—N/a	Won
2007	Komchadluek Awards	Best Leading Actor	Me... Myself	Nominated
2007	Starpics Thai Film Awards	Best Leading Actor	Me... Myself	Nominated
2007	Suphannahong National Film Awards	Best Leading Actor	Me... Myself	Nominated
2007	Bangkok Critics Assembly Awards	Best Leading Actor	Me... Myself	Nominated
2007	Hamburger Awards	Best Leading Actor	Me... Myself	Nominated
2008	Starpics Thai Film Awards	Best Leading Actor	Sabaidee Luang Prabang	Nominated
2008	Starpics Thai Film Awards	Best Leading Actor	Happy Birthday	Won
2008	Top Awards	Best Leading Actor	Happy Birthday	Won
2008	Suphannahong National Film Awards	Best Leading Actor	Happy Birthday	Won
2008	Nine Entertain Awards	Actor Of the Year	—N/a	Nominated
2008	Bangkok Critics Assembly Awards	Best Leading Actor	Sabaidee Luang Prabang	Nominated
2008	Bangkok Critics Assembly Awards	Best Leading Actor	Happy Birthday	Won
2008	Komchadluek Awards	Best Leading Actor	Happy Birthday	Nominated
2008	Star Entertainment Awards	Best Leading Actor	Happy Birthday	Won
2009	Siam Dara Party Awards	Best Leading Actor	Happy Birthday	Won
2010	Komchadluek Awards	Best Leading Actor	Eternity	Won
2010	Komchadluek Awards	Best Leading Actor	The Red Eagle	Nominated
2010	Bangkok Critics Assembly Awards	Best Leading Actor	Eternity	Won
2010	Bangkok Critics Assembly Awards	Best Leading Actor	The Red Eagle	Nominated
2010	Suphannahong National Film Awards	Best Leading Actor	Eternity	Won
2010	Suphannahong National Film Awards	Best Leading Actor	The Red Eagle	Nominated
2010	Starpics Thai Film Awards	Best Leading Actor	Eternity	Nominated
2012	Komchadluek Awards	Best Leading Actor	Hi-So	Nominated
2012	Starpics Thai Film Awards	Best Leading Actor	Hi-So	Nominated
2012	Bangkok Critics Assembly Awards	Best Leading Actor	Hi-So	Nominated
2013	Bangkok Critics Assembly Awards	Best Leading Actor	Shambhala	Nominated
2013	Suphannahong National Film Awards	Best Supporting Actor	Shambhala	Nominated
2014	Suphannahong National Film Awards	Best Leading Actor	Concrete Clouds	Nominated
2014	Starpics Thai Film Awards	Best Leading Actor	Concrete Clouds	Nominated
2014	Bangkok Critics Assembly Awards	Best Leading Actor	Concrete Clouds	Nominated
2014	Golden Doll Awards	Best Leading Actor	Concrete Clouds	Nominated
2014	Komchadluek Awards	Best Leading Actor	Concrete Clouds	Nominated
2016	Dara Daily the Great Awards	Best Leading Actor	O.T.	Nominated
2016	Mthai Top Talk-About Awards	Best Leading Actor	Luead Mung Korn	Won
2016	Suphannahong National Film Awards	Best Leading Actor	Khun Pan	Nominated
2018	Komchadluek Awards	Best Leading Actor	Reside	Nominated
2021	Suphannahong National Film Awards	Best Leading Actor	Go Away Mr. Tumor	Nominated
2021	Bangkok Critics Assembly Awards	Best Leading Actor	Go Away Mr. Tumor	Nominated
2024	15th Nataraja Awards	Best Actor in Long-Form TV Series	The Betrayal	Won
2024	38th TV Gold Awards	Outstanding Leading Actor	The Betrayal	Nominated
2024	20th Kom Chad Luek Awards	Best Actor in a TV Drama	The Betrayal	Nominated
2024	29th Asian Television Awards	Best Actor in a Leading Role	The Betrayal	Won
