= Bin Bunluerit =

Thai actor and director

- บิณฑ์ บรรลือฤทธิ์
- Born: Top Bunluerit; May 27, 1962 (age 64); Aranyaprathet, Prachinburi (present-day in Sa Kaeo), Thailand
- Other name: Top
- Education: Ramkhamhaeng University
- Occupations: Actor; director; producer; social worker
- Years active: 1984–present
- Relatives: Ekapan Bunluerit (twin brother)

Bin Bunluerit or Bin Banluerit (Thai: บิณฑ์ บรรลือฤทธิ์; nickname: Top; born May 27, 1962, in Sa Kaeo province (Prachinburi province at the time) is a Thai actor and director whose notable works include the Thai historical drama, Bang Rajan, Panya Raenu, a series of comedy films, and the 2004 Hollywood film, Alexander.

== Educations ==
He graduated from Dhonburi Rajabat University and Ramkhamhaeng University.

== Film career ==
He entered showbiz in the 1980s, along with his twin younger brother Ekapan Bunluerit, as an actor in television dramas and movies, from the persuasion of the director and scout Kom Akkadej. He made his acting debut in the 1986 action film Tamruat lek (Iron Cop) alongside Pim Vadhanapanich, aka Marsha Vadhanapanich.

== Volunteer work ==
In addition to acting, he is well known in Thailand as a volunteer for the Ruamkatanyu Foundation for over 30 years. He left in October 2020 after management did not want him to make any political statements amidst the 2020 Thai protests; he is a supporter of the monarchy.
