= The Red Eagle =

- Film poster
- Directed by: Wisit Sasanatieng
- Written by: Wisit Sasanatieng
- Story by: Sek Dusit
- Produced by: Aphiradee Iamphungphorn; Kiatkamon Iamphungphorn; Suradech Assawareunganun; Pawas Sawatchaiyamet
- Starring: Ananda Everingham; Yarinda Bunnag; Pornwut Sarasin; Jonathan Hallman; Wannasingh Prasertkul
- Cinematography: Chukiat Narongri
- Edited by: Sunit Asvinikul; Phannipha Kabillikavanich
- Music by: Wild at Heart
- Distributed by: Five Star Production; Kantana Group
- Release date: 7 October 2010 (Thailand)
- Running time: 130 minutes
- Country: Thailand
- Language: Thai
- Box office: $446,529

The Red Eagle (Thai: อินทรีแดง, RTGS: Insi Daeng) is a 2010 Thai superhero film directed and written by Wisit Sasanatieng, based on the 1960s film series of the same name starring Mitr Chaibancha.

== Plot ==
In a fictional 2013, the Liberal Party leader Direk Damrongprapa (Pornwut Sarasin) campaigns during an election on an anti-corruption platform with the support of his fiancée Vasana Tienpradap (Yarinda Bunnag), a Harvard University-educated geology expert. Three years later, Vasana separates herself from Direk, now Prime Minister, over his betrayal in refusing to stop the construction of a nuclear power plant in Chumphon. Meanwhile, a masked vigilante known as Red Eagle (Ananda Everingham) emerges within the city. Red Eagle is actually Rom Rittikrai, a former Thai Special Force agent who had been rescued by Vasana when escaping from an attack by the Matulee (a secret society that hires masked assassin Black Devil to murder Red Eagle) and got a bullet in the brain; his terrible headaches can only be relieved by regular doses of morphine. Detective Chart Wuttikrai (Wannasingh Prasertkul) and his Sikh colleague Singh (Jonathan Hallman) are ordered to track down Red Eagle after he killed Sonkuan, a Member of Parliament and secret child sex offender. Vasana recognises that Red Eagle and Rome are the same man, igniting an attraction between them. Meanwhile, Chart and the Matulee continue to hunt Red Eagle down.

== Production ==
Ananda Everingham stars as the Red Eagle. The character was originally played by Mitr Chaibancha who died shooting the last scene in the 1960s film series of the same name. Everingham said that "if you know anything about the history of the film, well, you can understand that the role felt like it was big shoes to fill." The character was changed from being an alcoholic in the original series to being addicted to morphine in the new film.

== Cast ==
- Ananda Everingham as Rom Rittikrai/Red Eagle
- Yarinda Bunnag as Vasana Tienpradap
- Pornwut Sarasin as Prime Minister Direk Damrongprapa
- Jonathan Hallman as Singh/Black Devil
- Wannasingh Prasertkul as Detective Chart Wuttikrai
- Pattanadesh Asasappakij

== Release ==
The Red Eagle had its world premiere in Bangkok on October 4, 2010.The Red Eagle was released in Thailand on October 7, 2010. The film had its international premiere at the 15th Busan International Film Festival on October 10. The Red Eagle's Thai box office returns have been described as "underperformed" and "disappointing".

== Reception ==
The Red Eagle received generally negative reception from English language critics on its release. Film Business Asia gave the film a rating of three out of ten and called the film a "repetitive mess", stating "the main problem is the raggy script - a consistent problem with Sasanatieng's movies - and style-less, hand-held direction". The Hollywood Reporter has mixed feelings on the action scenes in the film, but called the choreography not "particularly creative". The review suggested if the project was made by directors Prachya Pinkaew and Panna Rittikrai that "it would have tighter action and more cinematic panache". Variety gave the film a negative review, calling the film overlong and noting that "aside from a few eye-catching setpieces, there's little excitement or cinematic flair on display." Both Variety and Film Business Asia critiqued the soundtrack calling it "Ear-splitting" and "the most deafening music track in memory" respectively.
