= Petchara Chaowarat =

Thai film actress

- เพชรา เชาวราษฎร์
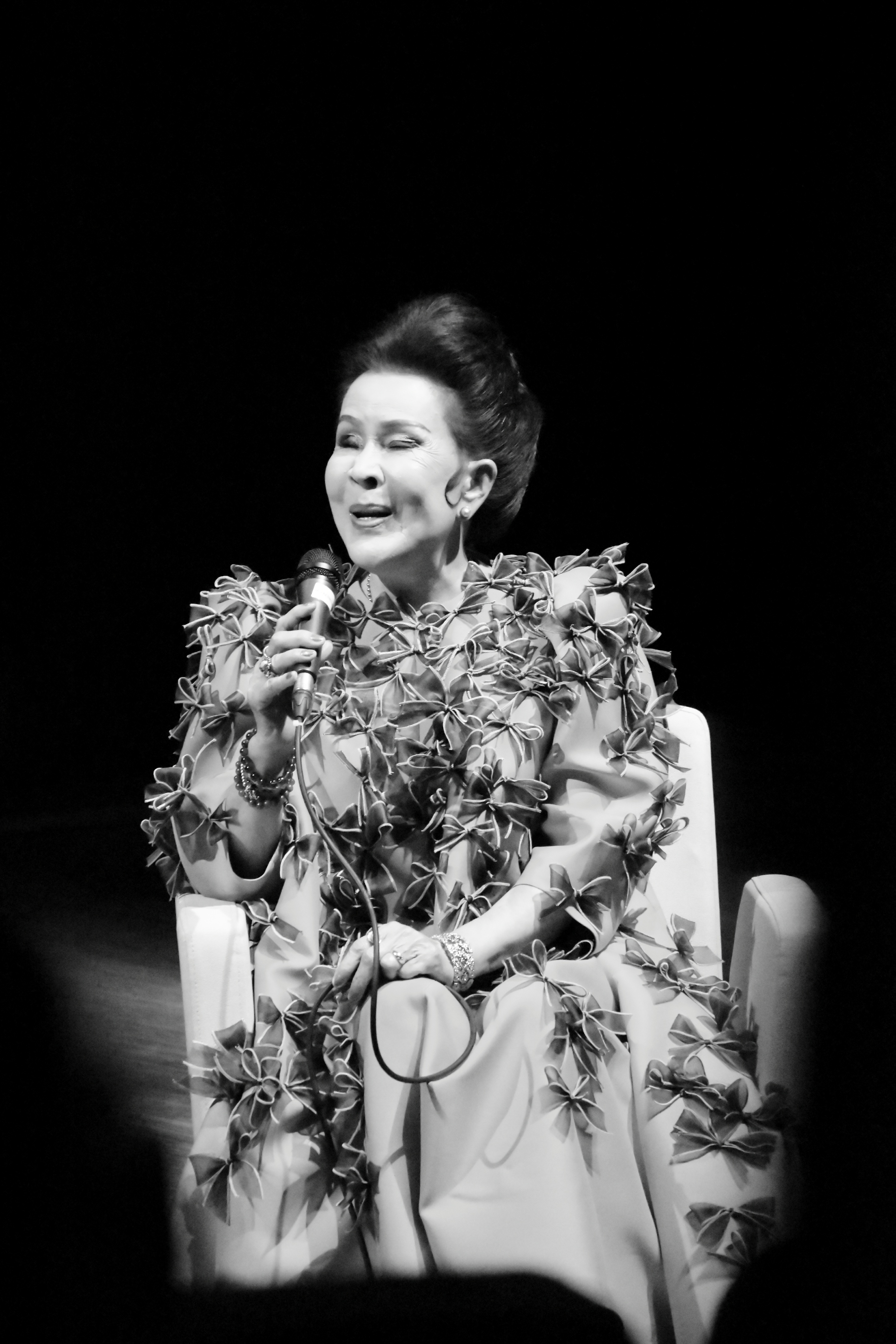
- Petchara Chaowarat
- Born: Ek Chaowarat; January 19, 1943 (age 83); Rayong, Thailand
- Occupation: Actress
- Years active: 1961–1978
- Spouse: Charin Nantanakorn

Petchara Chaowarat (Thai: เพชรา เชาวราษฎร์, RTGS: Phetchara Chaowarat; born 19 January 1943) is a Thai actress who starred in around 300 films from 1961 to 1979. An icon of the "Golden Age" of Thai cinema, she was known for her elaborate hairstyles. Petchara was named a National Artist of Thailand in 2018.

== Career ==
Her first film and starring role was in Banthuk Rak Pimchawee ('Love Diary of Pimchawee'), in 1961. She co-starred with popular leading man, Mitr Chaibancha, and they proved to be popular pair, starring together in more than 150 films.

One of their most popular films was 1970s Monrak luk thung (Thai: มนต์รักลูกทุ่ง, or 'Magical Love of the Countryside'), a musical rhapsodizing Thai rural life.

In 1964, Petchara was named best actress by the Thailand National Film Awards committee for her role in Nok Noi, and received the award from King Bhumibol.

After Mitr Chaibancha's accidental death on the set of Insee tong in 1970, Petchara continued to act in films. She starred in the 1971 musical comedy Ai Tui ('Mr. Tui'), in which she co-starred with Sombat Metanee, who became a popular leading man after Mitr's death. Petchara's last film was Ai Khuntong, which was released in 1979.

Her public appearances have dwindled over the years, attributed to her near blindness, thought to have been caused from her many hours of working in front of the bright lights on film sets.

In 2004, performance artist Michael Shaowanasai co-directed and starred in the film, The Adventure of Iron Pussy, in which he portrayed a transvestite secret agent. The character's hairstyle, clothing and demeanor were based on Petchara. The film was co-directed by Apichatpong Weerasethakul. More Petchara homage came in 2005, with the film Yam Yasothon ('Hello Yasothon'), a musical-comedy directed by comedian-actor Petchtai Wongkamlao that was set in the 1960s and captured much of the colorful spirit of the Mitr-Petchara era.
