= Ghost Day (film) =

- Thai film poster for Ghost Day
- Directed by: Thanit Jitnukul; Titipong Chaisat; Sorathep Vetwongsatip
- Written by: Titipong Chaisati; Sorathep Vetwongsatip; Nidchaya Boonsiripunth; Samkan Chotikasawad; Yossapong Phonsup; Thanit Jitnukul
- Produced by: Thanit Jitnukul; Thawatchai Phanpakdee
- Starring: Joey Boy; Pimradapa Wright; Padong Songsang; Surasak Wongthai
- Cinematography: Wattana Wanchooplao
- Edited by: Sunit Asvinikul; Nopadol Kumduang; Titipong Chaisati
- Music by: Thippatai Pirompak
- Production company: Phranakorn Film
- Release date: 23 February 2012 (Thailand)
- Running time: 92 minutes
- Country: Thailand
- Language: Thai
- Box office: $79,292

Ghost Day (Thai: แก๊งค์ตบผี) is a 2012 Thai horror comedy film directed by Thanit Jitnukul, Titipong Chaisat, and Sorathep Vetwongsatip. The film was shown at the 16th Puchon International Fantastic Film Festival and was the fifth-highest-grossing film in Thailand on its opening week.

== Synopsis ==
The film is set in modern-day Bangkok, where the production team behind the television series Ghost Day is told that their show is going to be cancelled. To stop the end of their program, the staff decide to find a real haunted area to run the next episode live and, after viewing a video online by ghostbusters Mhen (Apisit Opasaimlikit) and Chiad (Padong Songsang), they decide to approach them to do a deal. Mhen and Chiad have brought along a real female ghost named Choompoo who appears right in front of Mhen, Chiad and Noo Na and starts roaming around the place until she manages to escape. Things later on get serious and complicated for them when another ghost appears as the production team is running in. The ghost possesses the show's director, Pom (Boriboon Chanruang), and drives away most of the crew, leaving the rest of them to deal with the ghost possessing Pom.

== Cast ==
- Joey Boy
- Pimradapa Wright
- Padong Songsang
- Surasak Wongthai
- Apisit Opasaimlikit as Mhen
- Padong Songsang as Chiad
- Boriboon Chanruang as Pom

== Release ==
Ghost Day was shown at the 16th annual Puchon International Fantastic Film Festival.

The film was released in Thailand on February 23, 2012. It was the country's fifth-highest-grossing film in its opening week, grossing $44,438. It grossed a total of $79,292 on its theatrical run in Thailand.

== Reception ==
Derek Elley of Film Business Asia gave the film a six out of ten rating, referring to it as "one of the better [Thai horror comedy films], though still very silly."

== See also ==
- List of Thai films
- List of ghost films
- List of horror films of 2012
- List of comedy films of the 2010s
