= Mitr Chaibancha =

Thai actor (1934–1970)

- มิตร ชัยบัญชา
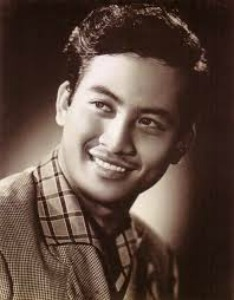
- Mitr around 1970s
- Born: Bunting Raweesang; 28 January 1934; Tha Yang, Phetchaburi, Siam
- Died: 8 October 1970 (aged 36); Pattaya, Thailand
- Other name: Pichet Phumhem
- Occupations: Film actor; producer
- Years active: 1957–1970

Flight Sergeant 2nd Class Pichet Chaibancha

Military service
- Allegiance: Thailand
- Branch/service: Royal Thai Air Force
- Rank: Flight Sergeant 2nd Class

Mitr Chaibancha (Thai: มิตร ชัยบัญชา, RTGS: Mit Chaibancha; 28 January 1934 – 8 October 1970) was a Thai film actor. He acted in 266 films from 1956 to 1970. He died on 8 October 1970 at Dongtan Beach, Jomtien, South Pattaya, after falling from a helicopter during the filming of a stunt for the final scene of Insee Thong (Golden Eagle).

At the height of his career in the 1960s, Mitr, along with Petchara Chaowarat, made a string of hit films that packed cinemas. Of the 75 to 100 films produced each year by the Thai film industry during this period, Mitr starred in nearly half of them.

== Early life and personal life ==
Mitr was born into poverty, named Bunting ("abandoned by destiny") by a monk. His parents separated when he was an infant. His father was a non-commissioned police officer. His mother came to Bangkok for work as a greengrocer and a better financial position. At age 8, Mitr moved to Bangkok's Nang Loeng neighborhood to live with his newly-married mother, where he took the surname Phumhem. He learned Muay Thai, became the lightweight champion for his school in 1949 and 1951 and went on to win three more titles. After finishing secondary school, he studied at Phra Nakhon College and was then accepted into the Royal Thai Air Force aviation school, where he trained as a pilot. Mitr then worked as a flight instructor at Don Muang Royal Thai Air Force Base.

In 1956, some friends showed photos of Mitr to journalist Kingkaew Kaewprasert, who introduced him to Surat Pukkawet, the editor of a movie magazine. Before long, he starred in his first film, Chart Suea (Tiger Instinct). It was then he decided to change his name from Pichet Phumhem to Mitr Chaibancha. He caught the attention of movie fans after starring in Chao Nakleng (Gangster Lord), using the character name Rom Ritthikrai from author Sake Dusit's Insee Daeng (Red Eagle) series of novels.

He married his wife, Jaruwan, in 1959. In 1961, a son, Yuthana, or Ton, was born. However, the marriage ended in a divorce. He later remarried actress Kingdao Daranee, but the couple separated six years afterward. In 1969, he married Sasithorn Phetchrung, whom he was married to at the time of his death in 1970.

== Height of fame ==
In 1961, Mitr starred in Banthuk Rak Pimchawee (Love Diary of Pimchawee), his first film with Petchara Chaowarat. This was the beginning of the most celebrated hero-heroine partnerships in Thai cinematic history. The Mitr-Petchara duo made about 165 films together.

One of the pair's most famous films was 1970's Monrak luk thung (Thai: มนต์รักลูกทุ่ง, or Magical Love of the Countryside), a musical romantic comedy rhapsodizing Thai rural life.

Mitr was an extremely busy actor and was always on the move, going from set to set and sleeping as little as a two or three hours per night.

Another of his best-known movies, Pet Tad Pet (Operation Bangkok), was shot in both Bangkok and Hong Kong, and featured Kecha Plianvitheee and Luecha Naruenart as the villains.

Monrak luk thung was one of Mitr's last films. It played in Bangkok cinemas for a solid six months in 1970 and took in 6 million baht, its popularity spurred by the best-selling soundtrack album and Mitr's accidental death while filming Insee Thong.

== Hong Kong films ==
In addition to Thai films, Mitr also starred in foreign films. In 1970, he starred in the Hong Kong wuxia film Flyer & Magic Sword (Chinese: 飛俠神刀, Thai: อัศวินดาบกายสิทธิ์), directed by Chan Lit-ban. The film had two versions: in the international release, the female lead was played by Ling Fan, while in the Thai release, the female lead was played by Petchara Chaowarat. Mitr was also contracted to star in two other films of the same genre. However, he died suddenly before filming on this film could be completed. For the ending, Thai actor Chat Chaiyaphum, who bore a physical resemblance to Mitr, was brought in to stand in for him and complete the remaining scenes.

== Insee Thong and death ==
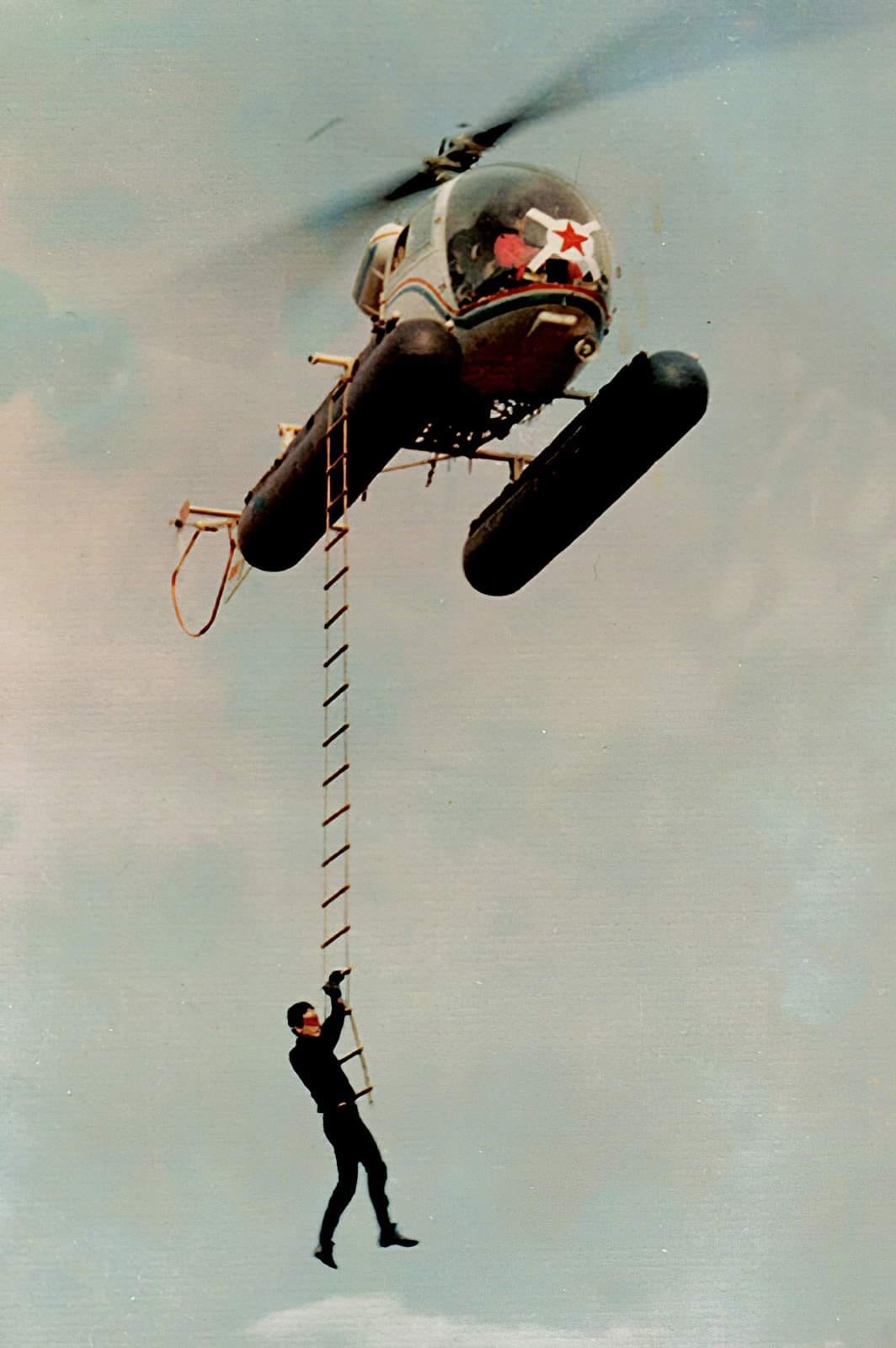
Filming of the helicopter scene, moments before Mitr's death

Insee Thong was the first film that Mitr produced himself, and it featured the return of his popular character, the masked crime-fighter Insee Daeng (Red Eagle) – alcoholic detective Rom Rittikrai's secret alter ego.

On the last day of shooting, the script called for Mitr, having vanquished the villains, to fly off into the sunset in a helicopter. As the camera rolled, Mitr leapt from the ground to grab a rope ladder hanging from the aircraft, only managing to reach the lowest rung. Unaware of this, the helicopter pilot flew higher, which led to Mitr losing his grip and falling 300 feet (91 m) to his death. The accident was caught on film and was even left in the final theatrical release. The fatal fall has since been removed from DVD versions of the film, with Mitr simply flying off into the distance and some onscreen text paying tribute to him.

It was another death that would make 1970 a difficult year for the Thai film industry, as months earlier, pioneering director Rattana Pestonji collapsed while giving a speech urging government officials to support the domestic film industry. He died several hours later.

Mitr’s death was ruled an accident. For safety, there should have been two shots for the final scene. The first would have been of Mitr grabbing the ladder and flying off at low altitude. Then, a stunt double would have performed a second shot at a higher altitude.

== Funeral and memorial shrine ==
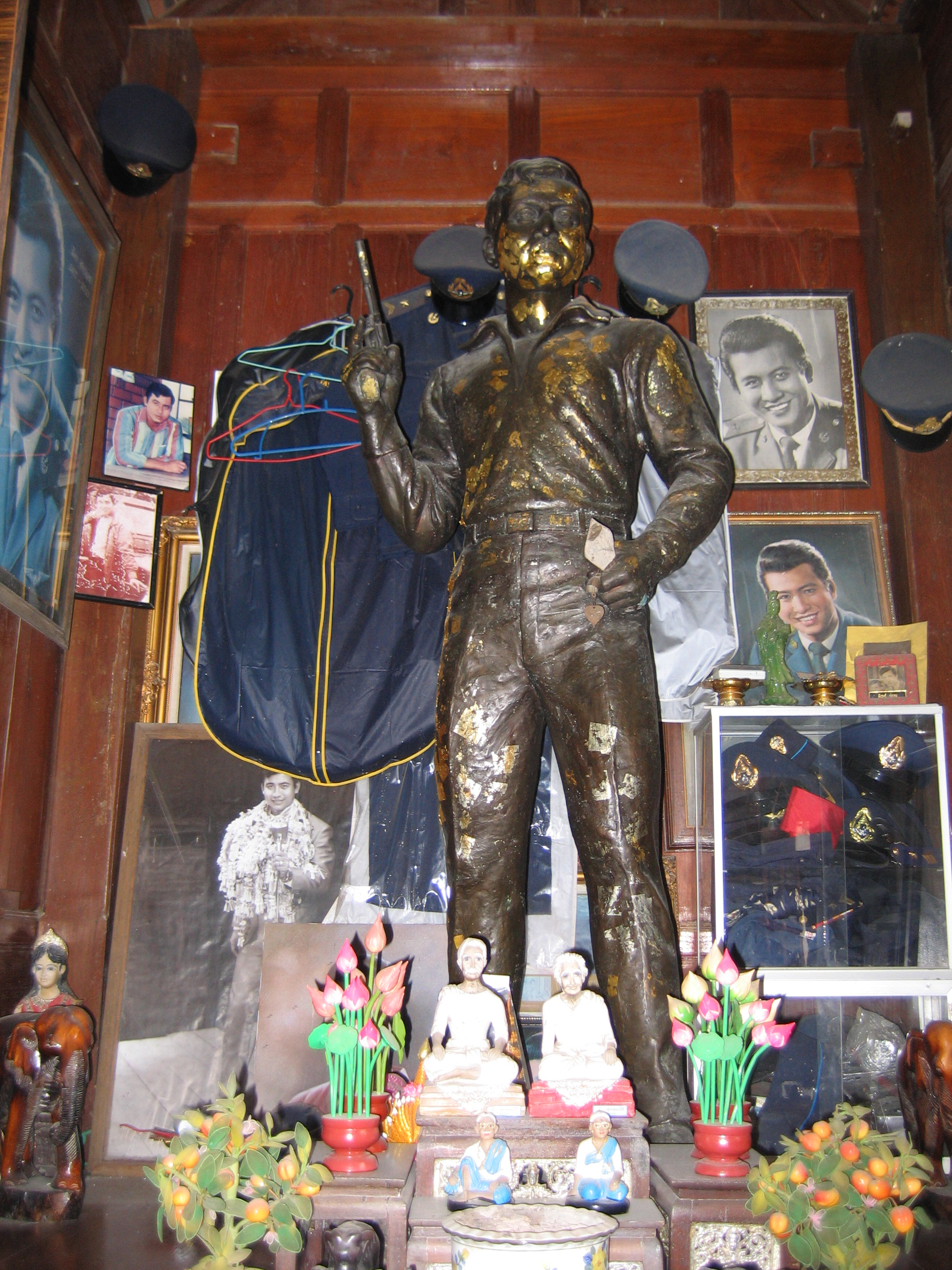
Statue of Mitr Chaibancha

Mitr's body was laid to rest at Wat Khae Nang Loeng in Bangkok for 100 days and then cremated at Wat Debsirindrawat Ratchaworawihan, where tens of thousands attended. The cremation appeared in the 2005 DVD release of Insee Thong, where his body is held up so onlookers could catch a last glimpse of him. Mitr was survived by his former wife and son.

A memorial shrine to Mitr is situated on a small street in Jomtien Beach, off Jomtien Road in front of the Amphoe Bang Lamung Revenue Department, behind Jomtien Palm Beach Hotel. The shrine is open from 6:00 a.m. to 6:00 p.m. daily. Inside the spirit house is a statue of Mitr holding a pistol in his right hand, reminiscent of his numerous roles as an action movie star. The walls are lined with photographs and other memorabilia. Fortune seekers visit the shrine, shake Kau Cim sticks and then check for the corresponding fortune on tablets hung on the shrine. If wishes have been granted, fortune seekers return and purchase a small offering to leave at the shrine.

== Legacy ==
In 2005, Channel 7 aired a 32-episode television drama based on the life of Mitr Chaibancha, titled Mitr Chaibancha: Maya Cheewit. The series starred Puttichai Amarttayakul as Mitr Chaibancha, Taksaorn Paksukcharern as Kingdao Daranee, and Fon Tanasoontorn as Petchara Chaowarat.

In 2023, Nonzee Nimibutr directed the Netflix film Once Upon a Star as a tribute to Mitr Chaibancha. Set during the golden age of Thai cinema, the film follows a traveling movie troupe that screens 16 mm films with live dubbing performed during screenings, a distinctive feature of the era. The film stars Sukollawat Kanaros and Nungthida Sophon.

== Partial filmography ==
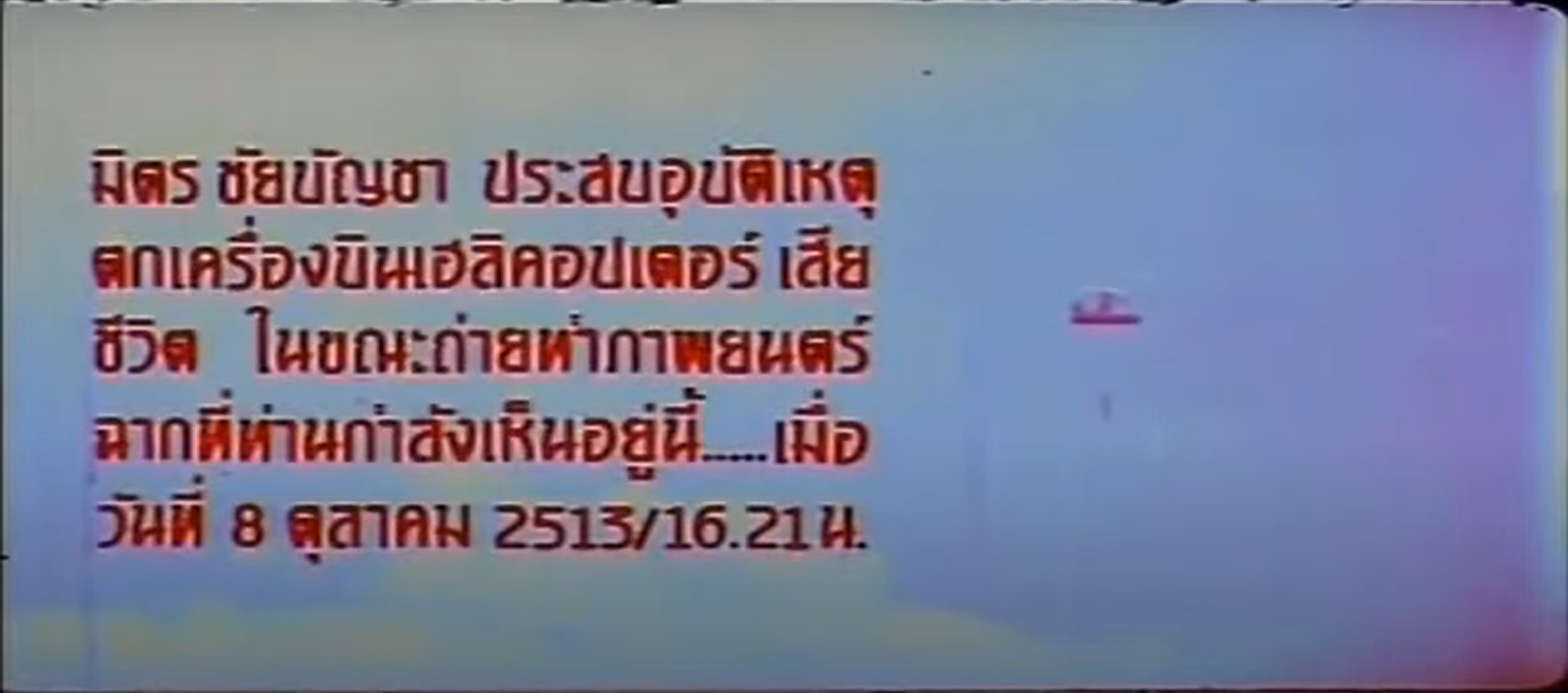
The message inside DVD releases of "Insee Thong" to replace actual footage of Mitr's death

- Chart Suea (1958)
- Ngern Ngern Ngern (Money, Money, Money) (1965)
- Pet Tad Pet (Operation Bangkok) (1966)
- Nguu Phi (Ghost Snake) (1966)
- Top Secret (1967)
- Torachon Khon Suay (Operation Revenge) (1967)
- 7 Prisoners (1967)
- Chicken Dance (1968)
- Monrak luk thung (Magical Love of the Countryside) (1970)
- Insee Thong (Golden Eagle) (1970, posthumous)
- The Tiger and the Dragon (1971, posthumous)
