= Violette Wautier =

Thai singer and songwriter (born 1993)

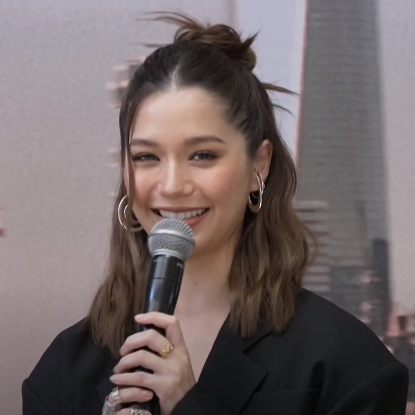
- Violette in 2022
- Born: October 10, 1993 (age 33); Yokohama, Kanagawa, Japan
- Citizenship: Thailand
- Education: Chulalongkorn University (B.Com.Arts)
- Occupations: Singer; songwriter; actress; model
- Years active: 2013–present
- Organization: The Wautier
- Partners: Jirayu La-ongmanee (2019–present)
- Musical career
- Genres: Pop; alternative pop; electropop; T-pop
- Instrument: Vocals
- Labels: Universal; The Wautier

Violette Wautier (Note: French pronunciation: [vjɔlɛt wotje]; Thai: วิโอเลต วอเทียร์, pronounced [wī.ʔōː.lèt wɔ̄ː.tʰīa]) (Thai: วี วิโอเลต วอเทียร์, born 10 October 1993) is a Thai singer, songwriter, and actress. She achieved national recognition when she audition on the season 2 of the television talent show The Voice Thailand in 2013, then started off her career in both singing and acting. She has starred in the films Heart Attack, A Gift, and Die Tomorrow. She has won multiple awards for her acting including the Suphannahong National Film Awards for Best Supporting Actress in Thailand (2016).

Violette is also the most-streamed English language Thai artist. Her track "Smoke" was the number-one song on the Apple charts in multiple Southeast Asian countries. She released her first English album Glitter and Smoke in 2020.

== Early life and education ==
Violette Wautier was born on 10 October 1993 in Yokohama, Kanagawa Prefecture, Japan. Her father, François Wautier, is Belgian and worked as a software engineer. Her mother, Ruchira Taprap, is a Thai and was an associate professor at King Mongkut's Institute of Technology Ladkrabang's Department of Agro-Industry. She has one younger brother, Khan.

Wautier grew up in Thailand, as her family moved there from Japan when she was two years old. As a kid, she watched Disney movies and Luc Besson's The Fifth Element, which inspired her to become a storyteller. When she was 14, she authored a fiction novel.

Violette attended Marialai School, remaining there until 2009, before transferring to Debsirinromklao School. She was also an AFS exchange student in Canada. She was then inspired by Taylor Swift to become a songwriter and she started performing at her high school and listened to more English songs.

== Career ==
=== 2013-2018: The Voice and career beginnings ===
Violette first appeared on a music video of the band C-Quint. She then joined season 2 of the singing competition The Voice Thailand in 2013, when she was 19 years old. She auditioned with the song "Leaving On a Jet Plane", and got all four coaches to turn their chairs for her and chose the team of Joey Boy. She didn't make it through the Knockout round.

Round	Song	Original Artist	Date	Result
Blind Audition	"I'm Leaving On a Jet Plane"	John Denver	September 29, 2013	All four chairs turned; joined Team Joey
Battle Round	"คุกเข่า"	Cocktail	November 3, 2013	Saved by Joey
Knockout	"99 Problems"	Jay-Z	November 17, 2013	Eliminated

After The Voice, she got her first acting role in the horror film The Swimmers, for which she received harsh criticism for her performance. She went on to record more songs for several films and television series, some of which she also acted in. She appeared in productions with studio GTH/GDH, winning the Suphannahong Award for Best Supporting Actress for her performance in Heart Attack (2015) and co-starring in A Gift (2016). In 2017, she also starred in the indie movie Die Tomorrow, which was directed by Nawapol Thamrongrattanarit. While acting, she also released the pop single "Gor Kai Mai Me Chan (Just Without Me)" and was also for a time, a radio DJ for Cat Radio. After several years under Universal Music Thailand, she left to become an independent artist and launched her own record label in 2018, The Wautier Record.

=== 2018–2019: Success as an independent artist, Endless Love ===
In 2018, Violette released her first English-language single, "Drive". She released it with a music video directed by Nattawut Poonpiriya. She followed up on the success of the hit with a second track named "Smoke" in the same year. "Smoke" went on to break the record for most views for an English song performed by a Thai artist on YouTube with over 90 million views as of August 2024, and making her the most-streamed English language Thai artist in history. The single also ranked No. 1 in 8 countries, including Thailand, Singapore and Malaysia. That year, she also starred in Club Friday The Series 10: Ruk Rao Mai Tao Garn.

In 2019, Wautier played the lead role in the Thai remake of the Taiwanese drama series Endless Love.

=== 2020–2021: Glitter and Smoke ===
Followed the success of "Smoke" and reunited with Universal Music Thailand after more than a year away from the recording studio, Violette released her long-awaited third single in March 2020. Named after a small town in the south of France, "Brassac" is an alternative pop anthem inspired by Violette's own short-lived summer romance which what she called a "Call Me By Your Name" vibe. Her single "I'd Do it Again", an anthemic electro-pop which reminisces about her past love was set to be the lead single for her debut all-English album Glitter and Smoke, dropped on June 19, 2020. It was an album she co-produced with all nine tracks written by her. Glitter and Smoke was chosen by NME Asia as one of the top 10 albums from Southeast Asian artists for 2020.

Wautier was then seen in the film One for the Road, which won an award at the 2021 Sundance Film Festival. On August 19, 2021, she released the music video for her new single "This Time". Earlier that month, she collaborated with Suppasit Jongcheveevat for the track "Love Hate". She then collaborated with Indonesian electronic music trio Weird Genius for the single "Future Ghost".

=== 2022–present: Your Girl and CALL ME DRAMATIC ===
On October 31, 2022, Wautier released her second album "Your Girl". Her first Thai language album, it contained 10 tracks about her experiences with love as she grew up. A day later, she released the music video for ‘ระวังเสียใจ (Warning)’. She closed out 2022 as one of Thailand's Top 5 Female Artists on Spotify Wrapped and performed at CentralWorld's New Year's Eve countdown celebration.

On June 24, 2023, Wautier staged her first concert, "YOU BETTER LOVE ME". On October 11, 2023, she released "Turn Back Time", her collaboration with Filipino singer Zack Tabudlo in which she wrote the second verse. A music video was then released that featured them and Thai actor Vachirawit Chivaaree.

In 2024, Wautier performed at the 555 Thai Music Festival, the first-ever all-Thai artists event held in Singapore. In May of that year, she released her comeback single "Dancing on a Graveyard". On August 8, 2024, she released another international single "Favorite Mistake". Later that year, she released another international EP, "CALL ME DRAMATIC". It features seven songs based on different film genres.

== Artistry ==
=== Influences ===
Taylor Swift is one of Wautier's first inspirations to become a songwriter. When she was younger, she was influenced by Thai singer Sarunrat Deane. Other songwriting influences include Lana del Rey and Lauv.

=== Musical style ===
Vogue Thailand once described her style as "appealing for hipster teenagers".

When writing songs, she focuses on her experiences. She prefers writing in English to cater to an international audience and to express herself better. She has also written songs in her native Thai and French.

== Personal life ==
Wautier is a luk khrueng, meaning her parents are of different nationalities. She is Thai-Belgian; her father is Belgian while her mother is Thai.

When Wautier was 14, she was diagnosed with scoliosis, which required surgery, and has since been vocal about her experiences with the disease. She has also been mocked for her height, as she is 158 cm tall (5 ft 2 inches).

In 2015, Wautier graduated from Chulalongkorn University with a Faculty of Communication Arts degree in Motion Pictures and Still Photography.

Wautier is currently dating Jirayu La-ongmanee, an actor and lead singer of the band Retrospect. They started dating in 2019.

== Awards and nominations ==
- Popular Female Thai Pop Singer Award from Siam Dara Stars Awards 2015
- 25th Suphannahong National Film Awards for Best Supporting Actress from Heart Attack
- 6th Thai Film Directors Association Awards for Best Supporting Actress from Heart Attack
- The 13th Kom Chad Luek Awards for Best Supporting Actress from the movie Heart Attack
- Thai Film Awards, 24th Entertainment Critics' Association, Best Supporting Actress category, from the movie Heart Attack
- Nominated for Best Southeast Asian Act at the 2020 MTV EMAs
- Nominated for the Thailand Social Awards 2022 Best Entertainment on Social Media, Female Artist category
- 2023 Tatler Asia's Most Influential
- 2024 Best Female Artist from Guitar Mag Awards
- 2024 Best Drama Song from Guitar Mag Awards
- 2024 Best Female Artist from Season Awards
- 2024 Best Solo Female Artist from 33rd Season Awards

== Discography ==
=== Album ===
Title	Year
Glitter and Smoke	Released: June 18, 2020; Label: Universal Music Thailand; Formats: CD, digital download, streaming
Your Girl	Released: October 31, 2022; Label: Universal Music Thailand; Formats: CD, digital download, streaming
Call Me Dramatic	Released: October 3, 2024; Label: Universal Music Thailand; Formats: CD, digital download, streaming

=== Singles ===
==== As lead artist ====
Year	Title	Peak chart positions		Albums
Year	Title	IW chart	Billboard Thai	Albums
2015	"อยากฟัง" (I Want to Listen)	—	*	Non-album singles
2017	"ก็แค่ไม่มีฉัน" (Just Without Me)	—	*	Non-album singles
2017	"ไม่เป็นไร...เข้าใจ (Goodbye)"	—	*	Non-album singles
2021	"กักตัว" (Self-Isolate)	—	*	Your Girl
2021	"ตั้งแต่มีเธอฉันมีความสุข (This Time)"	—	*	Your Girl
2021	"ดูดฝุ่น (home)" (ร่วมกับ Morvasu)	—	*	In a relationship with_
2022	"จินตนาการ (IMAGINE)"	—	76	Your Girl
2022	"ระวังเสียใจ (Warning)"	—	—	Your Girl
International Singles
2018	"Drive"	—	*	Glitter and Smoke
2018	"Smoke"	—	*	Glitter and Smoke
2020	"Monster"	—	*	Non-album singles
2020	"Brassac"	—	*	Glitter and Smoke
2020	"I'd Do It Again"	—	*	Glitter and Smoke
2021	"Future Ghost" (ร่วมกับ Weird Genius)	—	*	Non-album singles
2024	"Dancing on a Graveyard"			Non-album singles
2024	"Favorite Mistake"			Non-album singles
"—" means that the song is not on the chart / IWChart launched in 2010 / Billboard Thailand Songs launched on February 17, 2022

==== As featured artist ====
Year	Title	Album
2014	"รักแรกเจอ" (First Love) (Joey Boy featuring Violette Wautier)	No album
2018	"ดวงจันทร์กลางวัน" (Afternoon) (Getsunova featuring Violette Wautier)	NEXTPLORER
2018	"เพียงพอ" (Enough) (Potato featuring Violette Wautier)	No album
2018	"Let’s Start Tonight" (KITB featuring Violette Wautier)	No album
2019	"Spirit Bomb" (Wayfloe featuring Violette Wautier)	Neon West
2019	"Deep Down" (DABOYWAY featuring Violette Wautier)	DABOYWAY
2020	"SELFMADE" (URBOYTJ featuring Violette Wautier)	SELFMADE
2021	"Drowned" (babychair featuring Violette Wautier)	No album
2021	"Break U Down" (DABOYWAY featuring Violette Wautier)	DABOYWAY
2023	"ย้อนแชท(Your Chat)" (Sarah Salola featuring Violette Wautier)	No album
2023	"Clouds" (Defying Decay featuring Violette Wautier)	No album
2023	"Turn Back Time" (Zack Tabudlo featuring Violette Wautier)	3rd Time’s A Charm
2023	"AI" (Slot Machine featuring Violette Wautier)	No album

=== Soundtrack appearances ===
Year	Title	Album
2014	ฝากไว้	The Swimmers OST
2015	อยากรู้หัวใจตัวเอง	Ab Ruk Online OST
2015	สะดุด	Nang Sao Thong Sroi (2015) OST
2015	หากฉันตาย	Kor Pen Jaosao Suk Krung Hai Cheun Jai OST
2015	Vacation Time	Heart Attack OST (with Apiwat Ueathavornsuk)
2016	ยามเย็น	A Gift OST
2016	พรปีใหม่ (with Thongchai McIntyre)	A Gift OST
2017	จังหวะจะรัก	Heartbeat OST
2018	The Love I Never Knew (Thai Version)	The Legend of Muay Thai: 9 Satra OST
2020	Follow Me	Bad Genius OST (with Paris Intarakomalyasut)
2022	One Last Cry	F4 Thailand: Boys Over Flowers OST
2022	ถ้าเธอ	One for the Road OST (with Apiwat Ueathavornsuk)
2023	ข้ามเวลา (Time Travel)	Love Destiny 2 OST

=== Promotional singles ===
Year	Title	Note
2017	"จังหวะจะรัก (Heartbeat)"	In collaboration with Central Department Store
2018	"ปลายทางคือคุณ (Sound of places)"	In collaboration with Thai Airways
2020	"จังหวะจะรัก (Joyful Holiday Mix)" (ร่วมกับ แสตมป์ อภิวัชร์)	In collaboration with Spicy Disc
2021	"Taste Your Love"	For NESCAFE Barista
2021	"ก่อนรักกลายเป็นเกลียด" (ร่วมกับ มิว ศุภศิษฏ์)	In collaboration with Garena Free Fire
2022	"เต้นรำกับปัจจุบัน (This Moment)"	With Shiseido
2022	"เป็นเธอ (Brighter Sky)"	With Banpu

=== Other songs ===
Year	Title	Other artists	Album
2016	"It has to be better than before."	Modern Dog	No album
2016	"Delirious" ( Original Paradox )	Thanapob Leeratanakajorn	No album
2016	"New Year's Blessing"	Thongchai McIntyre	No album

=== Songwriting credits ===
Year	Song name	Artist	Album
2014	"Walk You Home"	Surasee Itthikul	No album

=== Music videos ===
Year	Title	Artist
2008	หายใจออกก็เหงา หายใจเข้าก็คิดถึง (Breathe Out and Be Lonely, Breathe In and Be Missing)	C-Quint
2018	Drive	Violette Wautier
2019	Smoke	Violette Wautier
2020	Brassac	Violette Wautier
2020	I'd Do It Again	Violette Wautier
2021	กักตัว (Quarantine)	Violette Wautier
2021	Future Ghost	Weird Genius featuring Violette Wautier
2023	Turn Back Time	Zack Tabudlo featuring Violette Wautier
2024	Dancing on a Graveyard	Violette Wautier
2024	BACK TO REALITY	Violette Wautier

== Filmography ==
=== Films ===
Year	Title	Role	Notes
2014	The Swimmers	Mint	Supporting role
2015	Heart Attack	Je	Supporting role
2016	Lost in Blue	Pim	Main role
2016	A Gift	Pang	Main role
2017	Die Tomorrow	Lek	Main role
2021	One for the Road	Prim	Supporting role
2022	Faces of Anne	Anne	

=== Television series ===
Year	Title	Role	Notes	Channel
2016	O-Negative	Prim	Main role	GMM 25
2018	Club Friday The Series 10: Ruk Rao Mai Tao Garn	Jah	Main role	GMM 25
2019	Endless Love	Min	Main role	GMM 25
2021	Blackout	Mew	Main role	AIS Play; YouTube channel: Nadao Bangkok
2024	TOMORROW+i	Jessica Hearthill; Main Role	Episode 2	Netflix
