= Chonlasit Upanigkit =

Thai film editor

- ชลสิทธิ์ อุปนิกขิต
- Born: 1990 (age 35–36); Bangkok, Thailand
- Education: Silpakorn University
- Occupation: Film editor
- Years active: 2012–present
- Notable work: Mary Is Happy, Mary Is Happy; Heart Attack; Bad Genius

Chonlasit Upanigkit (Thai: ชลสิทธิ์ อุปนิกขิต, born 1990) is a Thai film editor. He is a frequent collaborator with Nawapol Thamrongrattanarit and other Thai independent directors. He has worked on feature films such as Mary Is Happy, Mary Is Happy (2013), Heart Attack (2015), and Bad Genius (2017), all of which won the Suphannahong Award for Best Editing.

== Filmography ==
Year	Film	Director	Notes
2012	36	Nawapol Thamrongrattanarit	
2013	Mary Is Happy, Mary Is Happy	Nawapol Thamrongrattanarit	Suphannahong National Film Awards for Best Film Editing
2014	W	Chonlasit Upanigkit	Chonlasit's first directorial role, originally filmed as his bachelor's thesis film and re-edited for limited release in 2014. Nominated—Suphannahong National Film Awards for Best Film Editing
2015	The Blue Hour	Anucha Boonyawatana	Nominated—Suphannahong National Film Awards for Best Film Editing; Bangkok Critics Assembly Awards for Best Editing
2015	Heart Attack	Nawapol Thamrongrattanarit	Suphannahong National Film Awards for Best Film Editing; Nominated—Bangkok Critics Assembly Awards for Best Editing
2016	One Day	Banjong Pisanthanakun	Nominated—Suphannahong National Film Awards for Best Film Editing
2016	A Gift	Jira Maligool, Nithiwat Tharathorn, Chayanop Boonprakob and Kriangkrai Vachiratamporn	Nominated—Suphannahong National Film Awards for Best Film Editing
2017	Bad Genius	Baz Poonpiriya	Suphannahong National Film Awards for Best Film Editing; Bangkok Critics Assembly Awards for Best Editing
2017	Die Tomorrow	Nawapol Thamrongrattanarit	
2017	Malila The Farewell Flower	Anucha Boonyawatana	
2017	In the Flesh	Kong Pahurak	
2018	BNK48: Girls Don't Cry	Nawapol Thamrongrattanarit	Assistant Editor
2018	Homestay	Pakpoom Wongpoom	Suphannahong National Film Awards for Best Film Editing
2019	The Stranded	Sophon Sakdaphisit	First Thai Netflix Original Series
2019	Happy Old Year	Nawapol Thamrongrattanarit	
2021	One for the Road	Baz Poonpiriya	
2022	Love Destiny: The Movie	Adisorn Tresirikasem	
2022	Blue Again	Thapanee Loosuwan	Chonlasit produced, executive produced, photographed, and edited this film. Nominated—Suphannahong National Film Awards for Best Film Editing
2022	Thai Cave Rescue	Baz Poonpiriya and Kevin Tancharoen	Netflix Original Series. Chonlasit edited episode 1 and 4, which Baz directed.
2022	OMG! Oh My Girl	Thitipong Kerdtongtawee	Supervising editor
2023	Delete	Pakpoom Wongpoom	Netflix Original Series. Chonlasit edited episode 1 and 2.
2023	Not Friends	Atta Hemwadee	
2024	Doctor Climax	Ekachai Uekrongtham	Netflix Original Series. Chonlasit edited episode 1.
2024	Borderless Fog	Edwin	Co-edited with Ahmad Yuniardi
2024	Our Beloved Journey	Thapanee Loosuwan	
2025	Flat Girls	Jiratsaya Wongsutin	Supervising editor
2025	A Useful Ghost	Ratchapoom Boonbunchachoke	
2025	The Believers Season 2	Wattanapong Wongwan	Chonlasit edited episodes 1, 3, 5, and 7.
2026	Tame	Thamuya Thasananukulkij	
