= Bad Genius (2017 film) =

2017 Thai film by Nattawut Poonpiriya

- Thai theatrical poster
- Directed by: Nattawut Poonpiriya
- Written by: Nattawut Poonpiriya; Tanida Hantaweewatana; Vasudhorn Piyaromna
- Produced by: Jira Maligool; Vanridee Pongsittisak; Suwimon Techasupinan; Chenchonnee Soonthonsaratul; Weerachai Yaikwawong
- Starring: Chutimon Chuengcharoensukying; Chanon Santinatornkul; Teeradon Supapunpinyo; Eisaya Hosuwan
- Cinematography: Phaklao Jiraungkoonkun
- Edited by: Chonlasit Upanigkit
- Music by: Hualampong Riddim
- Production company: Jor Kwang Films
- Distributed by: GDH 559
- Release date: 3 May 2017 (Thailand)
- Running time: 130 minutes
- Country: Thailand
- Language: Thai
- Box office: US$44.6 million

Bad Genius, known in Thai as Chalard Games Goeng (ฉลาดเกมส์โกง), (Note: The Thai title (pronounced [tɕʰa.làːt.kēːm.kōːŋ], RTGS: Chalat Kem Kong) is a play on the Thai phrase chalat kaem kong (ฉลาดแกมโกง, pronounced [tɕʰa.làːt.kɛ̄ːm.kōːŋ]), which means "clever/cunning in a cheating way". The English loanword games supplants the middle word, giving the meaning "clever in the games of cheating".) is a 2017 Thai heist thriller film produced by Jor Kwang Films and distributed by GDH 559. Directed by Nattawut Poonpiriya and co-written by Nattawut, Tanida Hantaweewatana, and Vasudhorn Piyaromna, it stars Chutimon Chuengcharoensukying in her feature film debut as Lynn, a straight-A student who devises an exams-cheating scheme which eventually rises to international levels.

Inspired by real-life news reports of a major SAT cheating scandal, the film transplants the heist structure to a school-exams setting, and features themes of class inequality as well as teenage social issues. Relative newcomers Chanon Santinatornkul, Teeradon Supapunpinyo and Eisaya Hosuwan play Lynn's classmates Bank, Pat and Grace, while veteran Thai singer and actor Thaneth Warakulnukroh plays Lynn's father. Filming took place on location in Thailand and Australia.

Bad Genius was released in Thailand on 3 May 2017, placing first at the Thai box office for two weeks and earning over 100 million baht (US$3 million), the highest-grossing Thai film of 2017. Overseas, it broke Thai film earning records in several Asian countries, including China, where it grossed over $30 million, making it the most internationally successful Thai film ever. Critics praised the film's performances (especially Chutimon's), direction, and screenplay, though some criticized its ending. Among its awards and nominations, the film won a record-breaking twelve awards at the 27th Suphannahong National Film Awards, including Best Picture.

== Plot ==
Lynn, a top secondary school student living with her father, is accepted into a prestigious school, earning a scholarship for her academic achievements. There, she is befriended by the good-natured but academically challenged Grace. Lynn begins to help Grace cheat in exams after finding out that their teacher has been leaking questions in private tutoring sessions. She is then approached by Grace's rich boyfriend Pat, who offers payment in exchange for also helping him and his friends. Although at first reluctant, Lynn agrees when she finds out that the school, despite her scholarship, collected extra fees from her father, who earns a modest income as a teacher. She devises a system of hand signals, based on certain piano pieces, and uses them to send answers during exams. Her base of clients eventually grows. However, her cheating is inadvertently revealed by Bank, another top student. She is reprimanded by her father, and also by the school, which suspends her scholarship and revokes her chance to apply for an international scholarship at university level.

Lynn returns to cheating when Pat and Grace ask her to help them with the STIC—an international standardised test for university admissions—a scheme which will earn them millions of baht. However, Lynn tells them that she can only do it with the help of Bank, who would never consider such dishonesty. Later, though, Bank, who is from a poor family and is staking his future on the same university scholarship, is attacked by thugs in the street and misses the scholarship exam. Lynn then approaches him with the offer and Bank reluctantly agrees. Together, they make preparations for the final operation. Lynn and Bank will fly to Australia in order to get a head start on the exams—which are held globally on the same day—and send back answers for Pat and Grace to distribute to their clients. However, on the eve of their flight, Pat lets slip that it was he who ordered the thugs to beat up Bank, in order to force him to join their scheme. Enraged, Bank attacks Pat and leaves. Lynn, shocked at the revelation, begins reconsidering her actions. However, Bank returns to confront Lynn and tells her to finish what she started.

In Sydney, Lynn and Bank complete the first sections of the test according to plan, but Bank is overcome by anxiety and gets caught. Lynn struggles to memorise the final section herself, but finally pulls through. She is pursued by the test administrator after feigning illness by forcing herself to be sick and leaving the test centre early, but is released when Bank denies knowing her. Returning home, Lynn finds that their scheme was a great success, but, broken by the experience, turns her back on her co-conspirators and rejects her share of the money. Some time later, she is approached by Bank, who has invested his share in revamping his mother's laundry business. Bank invites Lynn to start another scheme, this time with a much wider client base—those taking the national GAT/PAT university entrance exams. When she turns him down, Bank threatens to expose the whole affair and that she was the mastermind behind the scheme. Lynn then tells him that she has made her choice, deciding to come clean, tearfully confessing to her father, who comforts her and helps her redeem herself by submitting a formal confession to the STIC organisation.

== Production ==
=== Development ===
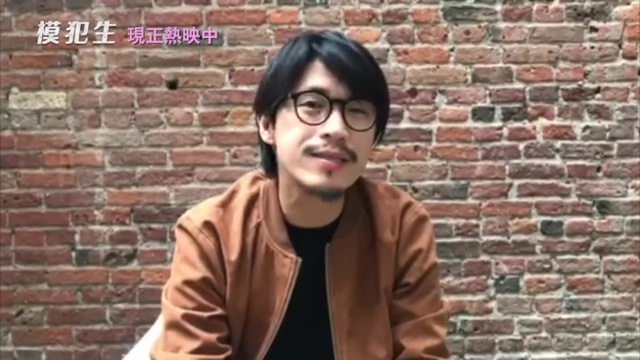
Director Nattawut previously directed GTH's 2012 psycho thriller Countdown.

Bad Genius was produced by Jira Maligool and Vanridee Pongsittisak, executives and veteran producers at GDH (previously GTH). (Note: Jira and Vanridee also acted as script supervisors. The film also lists three additional producer credits: Suwimon Techasupinan, Chenchonnee Soonthonsaratul and Weerachai Yaikwawong.) Jira came up with the film's premise when he heard on the news that SAT scores were being cancelled in China due to a cheating scandal. (Note: From 2014, the SAT has been subject to repeated cheating scandals in China and other East Asian countries. Reported cheating techniques include hired agents taking the test in earlier time zones in order to identify questions used in the test.) The producers then invited Nattawut Poonpiriya to direct the film. Nattawut had previously directed the company's 2012 psychological thriller Countdown, and the producers believed his abilities would lend themselves to developing Bad Genius as a heist film. Nattawut was immediately intrigued, and agreed to direct the project, which was developed under the working title "2B Come Won" (a reference to the 2B pencils used to fill in test choices).

Nattawut wrote the script together with Tanida Hantaweewatana and Vasudhorn Piyaromna, researching the format details of current standardised tests, as well as actual methods of exam cheating from the news. The script took about 1 1/2 years to complete. The story was developed as a Hollywood-style heist/caper thriller, but the writers made efforts to ground it in a context that would still be relatable to a Thai audience. A major challenge, according to Nattawut, was telling the story of students taking exams—"perhaps the most boring activity on earth"—in a compelling manner. The film's secondary theme, that of the characters' contrasting social backgrounds, emerged during the writing process.

=== Casting ===
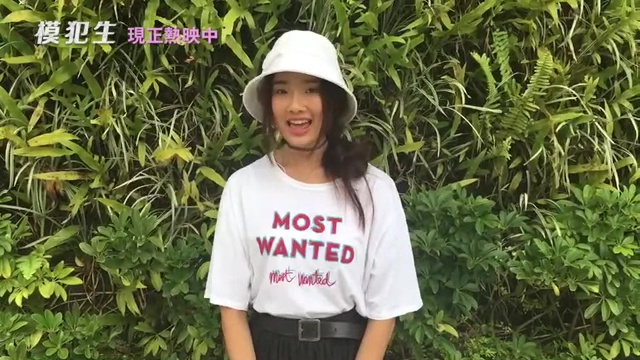
Lead actress Chutimon, a fashion model, made her film debut in Bad Genius.

The film's main cast was relatively inexperienced—none of the four young main actors had had film roles in a major studio production prior to 2017. Lead actress Chutimon Chuengcharoensukying, a fashion model, made her film acting debut as Lynn. Chanon Santinatornkul played the role of Bank, and Pat and Grace were played by Teeradon Supapunpinyo and Eisaya Hosuwan, respectively. (Teeradon and Eisaya had past TV acting experience, and Chanon had appeared in a few indie films as well.) According to Nattawut, casting for the four main actors took a long time before arriving at the four final choices, who were virtually perfect fits for their roles. He was so impressed with their work that he allowed them considerable room for improvisation during filming. The chemistry underlying Lynn and Bank's relationship, for example, was unscripted, and part of Pat's sales pitch speech was ad-libbed by Teeradon.

The only veteran actor in a major role was Thaneth Warakulnukroh, who played Lynn's father. Primarily a singer and songwriter, Thaneth had been absent from acting for over thirty years when Nattawut came across a magazine interview of him, and invited him to cast for the role. Nattawut noted that Thaneth's performance led him to modify the script and make the father less controlling, resulting in a more profound father-daughter relationship.

The cast underwent acting workshops for a couple of months before filming commenced. Romchat Tanalappipat served as acting coach, and worked with the actors before and during filming. Special preparations by the actors include Chutimon practising writing with her left hand, as her character is left-handed, and Chanon memorising the value of pi to beyond the 30th digit.

=== Filming ===
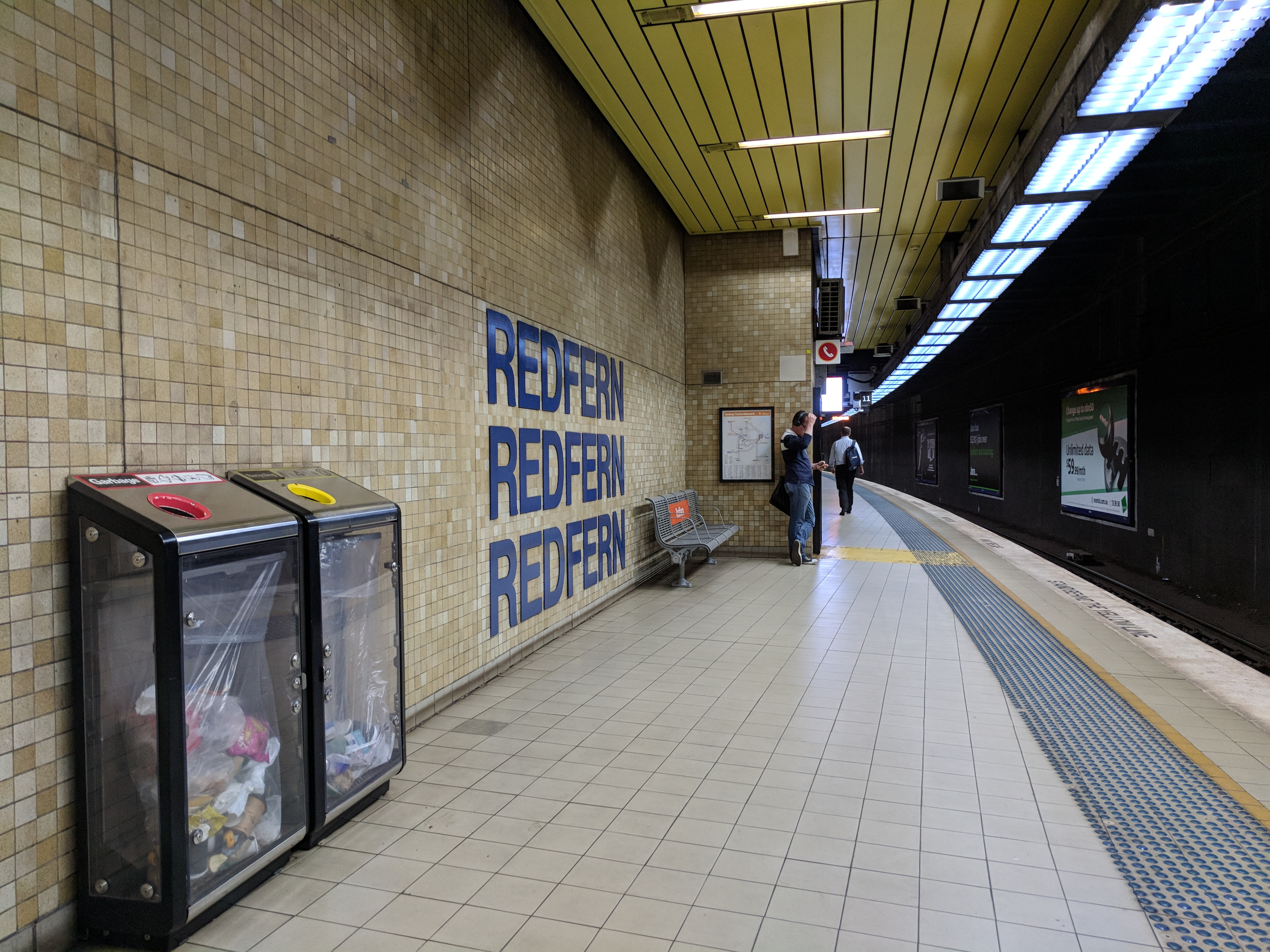
Redfern railway station was the location for a particularly challenging scene.

Most of the filming took place in Thailand, while approximately 30 percent, by Nattawut's estimate, was shot on location in Sydney, Australia. Some ten crew members flew to Australia from Thailand, while most of the Sydney filming unit was sourced locally. Filming in Sydney was subject to many more restrictions than in Thailand, including strictly limited shooting times. A particularly challenging scene to film was a chase sequence shot at the underground section of Redfern railway station, which had to be fitted into the trains' normal running schedule.

Nattawut had, since his early advertising work, frequently collaborated with cinematographer Phaklao Jiraungkoonkun. According to Phaklao, while most of Bad Genius's shots were designed in advance, some were improvised and designed on set. Others, like the mid-story exam sequence, necessitated advance detailed storyboarding and blocking. Nattawut also noted the challenge posed by the exam scenes, as the mundane action forced him to rely on the camerawork to convey suspense; the mid-story scene in particular comprised 200 shots for four pages of screenplay. Compared to his earlier work on Countdown, Nattawut says he learned to accept more input from the cast and crew instead of strictly trying to fulfil his visions. He found that asking Phaklao for opinions on shots led to better results, and editor Chonlasit Upanigkit also helped with his keen sense during post-production.

Stylistically, Nattawut says he was inspired partly by 1970s thrillers such as The Conversation, The Parallax View and All the President's Men, leading him to mix in a certain retro/vintage style in Bad Genius. Stills from The Godfather were used as a colour palette reference during post-production work with Kantana Post Production. Nattawut also used 2011's Tinker Tailor Soldier Spy as a reference. The retro style was also factored in the costume design, according to costume designer Pawaret Wongaram, who was also familiar with Nattawut from their work in advertising and joined Bad Genius as her first feature film. The score was composed by Hualampong Riddim's Vichaya Vatanasapt, who employed gradually intensifying cyclical elements to help build suspense.

The film was officially announced by GDH at a press event on 20 April 2017, along with the release of its theme song "Mong Chan Tee" (มองฉันที, (Note: Pronounced [mɔ̄ːŋ.tɕʰǎn.tʰīː], rtgs: "Mong Chan Thi".) which translates as "Look at Me"). Performed by Suthita Chanachaisuwan, the song is a rearrangement of the song "Why Can't You See" by Thai indie pop band Fwends, with new lyrics by Apiwat Eurthavornsuk.

== Release and reception ==
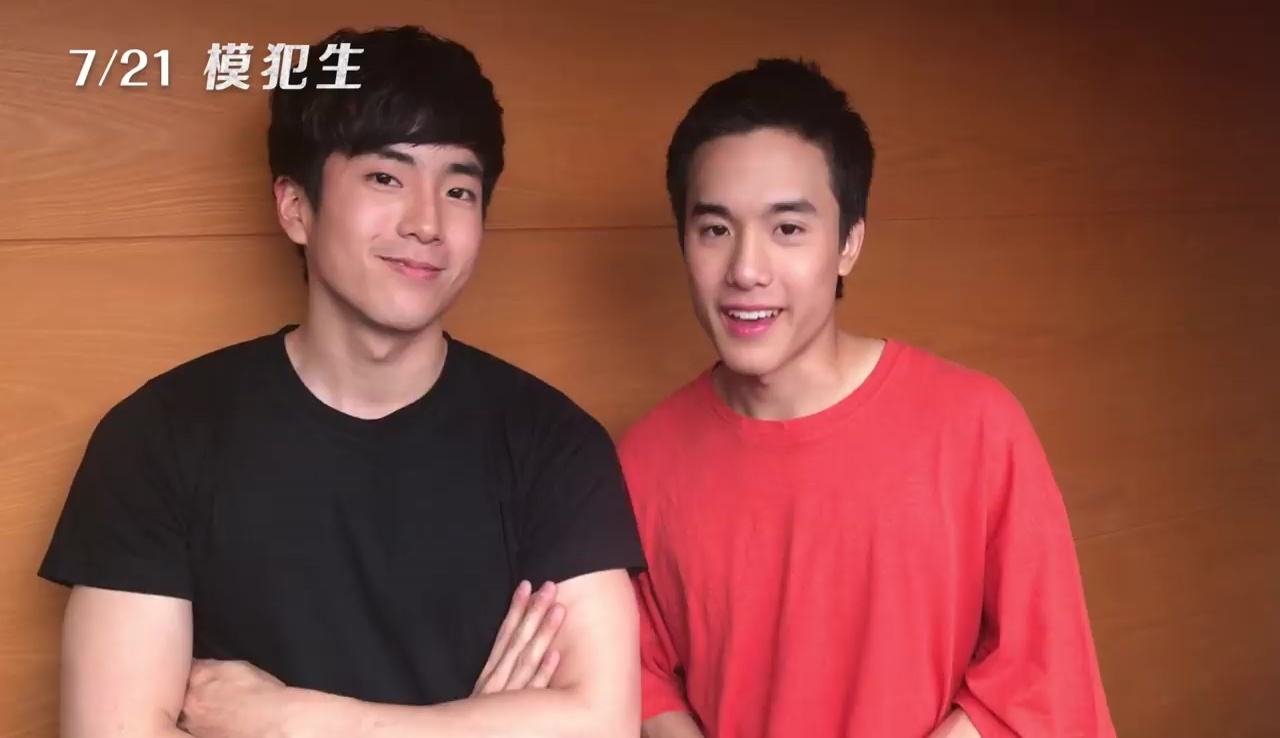
Actors Chanon (left) and Teeradon, in a promotional video for the film's Taiwan release. The film became a hit there, and Chanon in particular was the subject of a craze among Taiwanese fans.

Bad Genius premiered in Thailand on 3 May 2017 at 20:00, in early preview screenings prior to its full release the following day. It earned positive responses from viewers. The film was shown on 216 screens, earning 44.15 million baht (US$1.3 million) over its opening weekend and placing first at Thailand's box office for two consecutive weeks. It passed 100 million baht—a success benchmark for Thai films—on 20 May, and by the end of its theatrical run on 14 June, had earned 112.15 million baht ($3.3 million), making it the highest-grossing Thai film of 2017.

The film was released internationally throughout East and Southeast Asia, as well as in Australia and New Zealand. (Note: Countries and territories include Laos, Singapore, Cambodia, Taiwan, Malaysia and Brunei, Hong Kong and Macau, Indonesia, Myanmar, Vietnam, mainland China, the Philippines, South Korea, Australia and New Zealand, and Japan.) It placed first at Hong Kong's box office on its opening weekend, while in Taiwan and Malaysia, the film opened to limited screens but rapidly gained popularity by online word-of-mouth, also rising to the top of the box office in Taiwan. It broke records for highest-grossing Thai film in Cambodia, Taiwan, Malaysia, Hong Kong, and Vietnam.

The film opened in mainland China on 13 October 2017, a rare occurrence of a Thai film securing a wide release, unedited, in the country. It placed second at the Chinese box office and sixth globally (third excluding the US and Canada) during the weekend of 13–15 October. After seventeen days, it had earned at least $36.5 million, (Note: Some sources give $38.4M.) the highest gross ever of any Thai—or Southeast Asian—film in any overseas market. It was a huge success for Chinese distributor Hengye Pictures, who acquired the rights for flat fee of $3.3 million. The film earned a worldwide cumulative gross of $42.35 million as of 22 October, according to Comscore.

Bad Genius's international success has been compared to that of several popular Thai films during the early 2000s, including Ong-Bak, whose previous overseas record was surpassed by Bad Genius soon after its China release. However, the Bangkok Post's film editor Kong Rithdee noted that Bad Genius appeared to be an isolated case, as wider government support of the creative industry was still lacking. Yongyoot Thongkongtoon, GDH's senior director of international business affairs, attributed the film's success (despite the unconventional genre for Thai cinema) to its mainstream story, as well as the region's shared competitive academic culture, which made the film relatable to a wider Asian audience. Although Yongyoot said that the studio's films catered first and foremost to the Thai audience, and that international sales were seen as a bonus, GDH CEO Jina Osothsilp later commented that the company was working to expand its presence in the international market, and that Bad Genius's success in China served as an important milestone in that mission.

On the festival circuit, Bad Genius was screened as the opening feature of the 16th New York Asian Film Festival on 30 June 2017; it was the first Southeast Asian film chosen to open the event. The film was also screened at the Fantasia International Film Festival in Montreal, the New Zealand International Film Festival, Fantastic Fest in Austin, as well as the Vancouver, BFI London, Hawaii, San Diego Asian, Toronto Reel Asian, Leeds, Luang Prabang, and Toronto international film festivals, and also CinemAsia in Amsterdam and the Far East Film Festival in Udine, Italy.

== Other media and adaptations ==
Bad Genius was released on DVD on 16 November 2017 (after a delay from a previously announced 21 September release date), with a special edition available via pre-order. It was made available online via the iTunes Store and HOOQ the same day. The film was released on Netflix on 1 June 2018. A novelisation, written by Jidanun Lueangpiansamut and published by Jamsai Publishing, was released on 12 June 2018, and a soundtrack album of the film score was released as a set of vinyl records on 11 July 2019.

The film spawned multiple remakes and adaptations, with news of Indian and American acquisitions first reported on in 2018. A TV series adaptation by GDH, titled Bad Genius: The Series, was broadcast from 3 August to 8 September 2020. It was aimed at the Thai and Chinese market, and was directed by Pat Boonnitipat. A Bollywood version, produced by Salman Khan, was released as Farrey in November 2023. (Note: A different production was earlier announced by Neeraj Pandey, though it did not materialize.) And an American version, produced by Erik Feig and Patrick Wachsberger and directed by J.C. Lee, was released as Bad Genius in 2024.

A Philippine TV remake, also titled Bad Genius: The Series, has been announced for Viva One and revealed the cast on March 18, 2025. The series will be directed Roderick Cabrido.

== Critical response ==
Bad Genius was well received by critics in Thailand, who praised its concept and design, which tackled a familiar, mundane subject and turned it into an exciting caper thriller—a first for Thai cinema. The Bangkok Post's Kong observed, "An academic test is the most boring activity on earth. The film's conceit is to turn it into a gladiatorial ring, a place of risk, wit and sublime deception ... and against the odds it works." According to Nation TV's Natthapong Okapanom, "Bad Genius is a work of craft that will help raise Thai cinema to another level of diversity."

Manager's Aphinan Bunrueangphanao commended the acting, especially Chutimon's, Thaneth's and Chanon's, predicting multiple wins for the upcoming awards season, while A Day magazine's Phanuphan Veeravaphusit noted of the production: "Due credit must be given to ... the photography, with its unfamiliar-yet-meaningful angles, and shots taken to second-by-second detail, which, combined with the fast-paced editing, add to the suspense, stirring the viewers' emotions throughout the entire story." Phanuphan, as well as reviewers for Sanook and Post Today, also took note of the film's subtle critique of Thai society's inequality issues and problems with its education system, although he found the character's motivations for their actions in the end to be inadequately explained. Similarly, the Bangkok Post's Kong found fault with the somewhat moralizing ending, but also noted that by then the film had already successfully entertained the audience.

Among international critics, Bad Genius has an approval rating of 100% on the review aggregator website Rotten Tomatoes, based on twenty-one reviews, with an average rating of 8.06/10. Reviewing the film for The Hollywood Reporter, Clarence Tsui wrote, "Bad Genius scores high marks as a ceaselessly entertaining thriller that cedes little ground to the cheap comedy and sentimentality of recent Thai hits." And according to Variety's Maggie Lee, "Bad Genius deserves full marks for a whip-smart script that makes answering multiple-choice questions as nail-biting and entertaining as Ocean's Eleven." There were also mixed opinions regarding the ending. While Sarah Ward wrote in Screen that "the feature never shouts its message, nor lets it get in the way of its lively heist-like action," the South China Morning Post's Ben Sin commented, "It's an odd narrative departure [... which] gives the impression that Thailand's film censorship system is as strict with moral guidelines as is its mainland Chinese counterpart."

== Accolades ==
Bad Genius dominated the 2017 Thai film awards season. At the 27th Suphannahong National Film Awards, held on 11 March 2018, the film won a record-breaking twelve categories, including Best Picture, Best Director and Best Screenplay, as well as Best Actor and Best Actress. It also set a record for number of nominations received (sixteen nominations in fifteen categories, i.e. every category except Best Original Song). At the Bangkok Critics Assembly Awards, the film received eleven nominations in ten (out of thirteen) categories, tying in number of nominations with indie film ThaiBan The Series, and won nine, including all five main categories. Bad Genius was also nominated for Best Screenplay at the 12th Asian Film Awards, where Chutimon won Best Newcomer. The film was one of the four finalists considered by the National Federation of Motion Pictures and Contents Associations for Thailand's submission for the Academy Award for Best Foreign Language Film, but was not chosen, in favour of 2016's By the Time It Gets Dark.

The film also won several awards on the festival circuit. It won the Best Feature award at the New York Asian Film Festival, and lead actress Chutimon received the festival's Screen International Rising Star Asia award at the film's screening. Competition jury Kristina Winters spoke of the film, "[Bad Genius] re-envisions the heist movie with grades instead of gold and proves that commercial films can still be innovative and remind us why we love movies. With a complex plot, relentless pacing, driven editing, and strong performances, it makes test-taking exciting and had us on the edge of our seats." The film also won awards at the Fantasia Film Festival, Fantastic Fest, and the Toronto Reel Asian International Film Festival.

Bad Genius was registered as a national heritage film by the Thai Film Archive in its eighth annual listing, announced on 4 October 2018.

Award	Date	Category	Recipient(s) and nominee(s)	Result	Ref(s)
16th New York Asian Film Festival	15 July 2017	Jury Award	Bad Genius	Won	
16th New York Asian Film Festival	15 July 2017	Rising Star Award	Chutimon Chuengcharoensukying	Won	
20th Fantasia International Film Festival	2 August 2017	Cheval Noir – Best Director	Nattawut Poonpiriya	Won	
20th Fantasia International Film Festival	2 August 2017	Séquences Award – Best Film	Bad Genius	Won	
20th Fantasia International Film Festival	2 August 2017	Audience Award – Best Asian Feature	Bad Genius	Won	
20th Fantasia International Film Festival	2 August 2017	Audience Award – Most Innovative Feature Film	Bad Genius	Won	
13th Fantastic Fest	28 September 2017	Best Picture – Thriller Features	Bad Genius	Won	
21st Toronto Reel Asian International Film Festival	12 November 2017	Menkes Audience Choice Award	Bad Genius	Won	
27th Suphannahong National Film Awards	11 March 2018	Best Picture	Bad Genius	Won	
27th Suphannahong National Film Awards	11 March 2018	Best Director	Nattawut Poonpiriya	Won	
27th Suphannahong National Film Awards	11 March 2018	Best Actor	Chanon Santinatornkul	Won	
27th Suphannahong National Film Awards	11 March 2018	Best Actress	Chutimon Chuengcharoensukying	Won	
27th Suphannahong National Film Awards	11 March 2018	Best Supporting Actress	Eisaya Hosuwan	Nominated	
27th Suphannahong National Film Awards	11 March 2018	Best Supporting Actor	Teeradon Supapunpinyo	Nominated	
27th Suphannahong National Film Awards	11 March 2018	Best Supporting Actor	Thaneth Warakulnukroh	Won	
27th Suphannahong National Film Awards	11 March 2018	Best Screenplay	Nattawut Poonpiriya; Tanida Hantaweewatana; Vasudhorn Piyaromna	Won	
27th Suphannahong National Film Awards	11 March 2018	Best Cinematography	Phaklao Jiraungkoonkun	Won	
27th Suphannahong National Film Awards	11 March 2018	Best Film Editing	Chonlasit Upanigkit	Won	
27th Suphannahong National Film Awards	11 March 2018	Best Recording and Sound Mixing	Narubett Peamyai for Kantana Sound Studios Co., Ltd.	Won	
27th Suphannahong National Film Awards	11 March 2018	Best Original Score	Hualampong Riddim	Won	
27th Suphannahong National Film Awards	11 March 2018	Best Art Direction	Patchara Lertkai	Won	
27th Suphannahong National Film Awards	11 March 2018	Best Costume Design	Pawaret Wongaram	Won	
27th Suphannahong National Film Awards	11 March 2018	Best Makeup Effects	Arporn Meebangyang; Savitree Sukhumwat	Nominated	
27th Suphannahong National Film Awards	11 March 2018	Best Visual Effects	Yggdrazil Group Co., Ltd.; Posters Co., Ltd.	Nominated	
12th Asian Film Awards	17 March 2018	Best Newcomer	Chutimon Chuengcharoensukying	Won	
12th Asian Film Awards	17 March 2018	Best Screenplay	Tanida Hantaweewatana; Vasudhorn Piyaromina; Nattawut Poonpiriya	Nominated	
26th Bangkok Critics Assembly Awards	28 March 2018	Best Picture	Bad Genius	Won	
26th Bangkok Critics Assembly Awards	28 March 2018	Best Director	Nattawut Poonpiriya	Won	
26th Bangkok Critics Assembly Awards	28 March 2018	Best Actor	Chanon Santinatornkul	Won	
26th Bangkok Critics Assembly Awards	28 March 2018	Best Actress	Chutimon Chuengcharoensukying	Won	
26th Bangkok Critics Assembly Awards	28 March 2018	Best Supporting Actor	Thaneth Warakulnukroh	Won	
26th Bangkok Critics Assembly Awards	28 March 2018	Best Supporting Actor	Teeradon Supapunpinyo	Nominated	
26th Bangkok Critics Assembly Awards	28 March 2018	Best Screenplay	Nattawut Poonpiriya; Tanida Hantaweewatana; Vasudhorn Piyaromna	Won	
26th Bangkok Critics Assembly Awards	28 March 2018	Best Cinematography	Phaklao Jiraungkoonkun	Nominated	
26th Bangkok Critics Assembly Awards	28 March 2018	Best Editing	Chonlasit Upanigkit	Won	
26th Bangkok Critics Assembly Awards	28 March 2018	Best Production Design	Patchara Lertkai; Tarntup Reungtara	Won	
26th Bangkok Critics Assembly Awards	28 March 2018	Best Original Score	Hualampong Riddim; Vichaya Vatanasapt	Won	
