= Die Tomorrow =

2017 Thai film by Nawapol Thamrongrattanarit

- Theatrical release poster
- Thai: พรุ่งนี้ตาย or ดายทูมอร์โรว์
- Directed by: Nawapol Thamrongrattanarit
- Written by: Nawapol Thamrongrattanarit
- Produced by: Patcharin Surawatthanapong; Donsaron Kovitvanitcha
- Starring: Sunny Suwanmethanont; Patcha Poonpiriya; Chutimon Chuengcharoensukying; Violette Wautier; Jarinporn Joonkiat; Kom Chuanchuen
- Cinematography: Niramon Ross
- Edited by: Nawapol Thamrongrattanarit; Chonlasit Upanigkit
- Music by: Tongta Jitdee; Pokpong Jitdee (Plastic Plastic)
- Production companies: Very Sad Pictures; One Cool Production; Purin Pictures
- Distributed by: Asian Shadows
- Release date: 23 November 2017 (Thailand)
- Running time: 75 minutes
- Country: Thailand
- Language: Thai
- Box office: US$160,000

Die Tomorrow (Thai: พรุ่งนี้ตาย or ดายทูมอร์โรว์) is a 2017 Thai docudrama film directed by Nawapol Thamrongrattanarit. Structured in an essay-film style, it mixes six scripted stories with unscripted interviews, archival footage, audio recordings, and global death statistics.

The film won the New Asian Cinema Award for Best Film at the 2018 Five Flavours Asian Film Festival and received seven nominations at the Thailand National Film Association Awards. During a limited theatrical run in Thailand in November 2017, it grossed US$160,000.

== Plot ==
Set in Bangkok, the film follows several people on the final day of their lives, showing their everyday routines and conversations. Divided into 13 parts, it alternates between six scripted vignettes and seven documentary segments. An on-screen counter tracks global deaths at a rate of two per second, while title cards before or after each story note how the character will die without showing it on screen.

- Lucky Girls: Four young women celebrate in a hotel room the night before their university graduation, before one steps out to buy beer and is killed by a truck.
- You Smile: A brother and sister talk on a rooftop, putting off a shared meal that will not happen.
- A Passport: A woman waiting for a heart transplant helps her husband pack for a trip before his plane goes missing.
- The Lion King: An aspiring actress gets a commercial job after the company's first choice dies in an accident.
- No One Say I Love You: A young man dies by suicide after a breakup with his girlfriend.
- A Good Day: An aging musician spends a quiet afternoon talking with his daughter at home before dying in his sleep.

== Cast ==
=== Lucky Girls ===
- Patcha Poonpiriya as Jaa
- Chonnikarn Netjui as Prae
- Chutimon Chuengcharoensukying as Som
- Morakot Liu as Yok

=== You Smile ===
- Koramit Vajrasthira as the older sister
- Sirat Intrachote as the younger brother

=== A Passport ===
- Sunny Suwanmethanont as the husband
- Rattanarat Euathaveekul as the wife

=== The Lion King ===
- Jarinporn Joonkiat as May

=== No One Say I Love You ===
- Violette Wautier as Lek
- Kanyapak Wuthra as Lek's friend
- Yosawat Sittiwong as Teng

=== A Good Day ===
- Kom Chuanchuen as the senior musician
- Puangsoi Aksornsawang as his daughter

== Production ==
After directing the 2015 studio film Heart Attack for GTH, Nawapol returned to independent filmmaking for Die Tomorrow. He developed the project around the question of what film he would make if he were to die the next day, aiming to challenge the traditional Thai and Chinese taboo against discussing death openly. Following its selection for the 2016 Thai Film Pitching Project at the Cannes Film Festival, the film was financed through a grant from Thailand's Ministry of Culture and commercial sponsorships, including LG Electronics. Very Sad Pictures produced the film in association with One Cool Production and Purin Pictures.

Early drafts of the script focused on unusual deaths reported in newspapers, before Nawapol rewrote them to center on ordinary daily routines. Because the vignettes had no overlapping characters, he structured the film like a concept album, citing Thai rock band Pru's Zero and Radiohead's In Rainbows. He also drew inspiration from AKB48's "Green Flash" music video. Nawapol cast several actors from his earlier projects, including Sunny Suwanmethanont, Violette Wautier, Jarinporn Joonkiat, and Koramit Vajrasthira. Filming took place over two days per segment, one for rehearsal and one for shooting, with cinematographer Niramon Ross capturing the scripted scenes in long takes within a 1:1 square frame, contrasted against unscripted documentary interviews.

== Release ==
Nawapol released Die Tomorrow in Thailand before sending it to international festivals so local audiences could see it first. It opened on 23 November 2017 in a limited run across seven SF Cinema theatres in Thailand.

Hong Kong sales agent Asian Shadows acquired international rights ahead of the film's premiere in the Forum section at the 68th Berlin International Film Festival in February 2018. The film was later licensed for release in the United Kingdom, Ireland, Taiwan, and China.

== Reception and legacy ==
Die Tomorrow received generally positive reviews from critics. Writing for The Guardian, Peter Bradshaw described it as a "ruminative collection of vignettes steeped in everyday reality," noting its depiction of mortality in everyday life while remarking that its 75-minute runtime could have been longer. Mansel Stimpson of Film Review Daily gave the film four out of five stars, highlighting its naturalistic performances and tight framing, while the International Examiner noted Nawapol's understated handling of the subject matter. Among Thai publications, Mango Zero pointed to the tension created by the 1:1 framing and ticking-clock sound design. The Momentum compared the single-take segments to "flash fiction," though it found the statistical cutaways and interviews too heavy-handed.

Following actor Kom Chuanchuen's death from COVID-19 in April 2021, Die Tomorrow resurfaced on Thai social media as audiences revisited his dramatic role in the final segment. That same month, Nawapol announced that international remake rights had been acquired by a French production team.

== Awards and recognition ==
Year	Awards	Category	Recipient(s)	Result	Ref.
2018	Bangkok Critics Assembly Awards	Best Supporting Actress	Jarinporn Joonkiat	Won	
2018	Festival du nouveau cinéma	Prix de l'expérimentation	Die Tomorrow	Nominated	
2018	Five Flavours Asian Film Festival	New Asian Cinema Award for Best Film	Die Tomorrow	Won	
2018	Osaka Asian Film Festival	Grand Prix for Best Film	Die Tomorrow	Nominated	
2018	Starpics Thai Film Awards	Best Supporting Actress	Jarinporn Joonkiat	Won	
2018	Thai Film Director Association Awards	Best Supporting Actress	Jarinporn Joonkiat	Runner-up	
2018	Thailand National Film Association Awards	Best Picture	Die Tomorrow	Nominated	
2018	Thailand National Film Association Awards	Best Director	Nawapol Thamrongrattanarit	Nominated	
2018	Thailand National Film Association Awards	Best Editing	Nawapol Thamrongrattanarit and Chonlasit Upanigkit	Nominated	
2018	Thailand National Film Association Awards	Best Actress	Jarinporn Joonkiat	Nominated	
2018	Thailand National Film Association Awards	Best Supporting Actress	Rattanarat Euathaveekul	Nominated	
2018	Thailand National Film Association Awards	Best Supporting Actress	Violette Wautier	Nominated	
2018	Thailand National Film Association Awards	Best Supporting Actor	Sunny Suwanmethanont	Nominated	
