= AOY =

AOY may refer to:

- Angler of the Year award from the Bass Anglers Sportsman Society
- Athlete of the Year
- Assemblies of Yahweh
- Aoy, fictional character in Hunger, a 2003 Thai film
