= One for the Road (2021 film) =

2021 Chinese-Hong Kong-Thai film by Nattawut Poonpiriya

- Theatrical release poster
- Directed by: Nattawut Poonpiriya
- Written by: Puangsoi Aksornsawang; Nottapon Boonprakob; Nattawut Poonpiriya
- Produced by: Wong Kar-wai
- Starring: Thanapob Leeratanakajorn; Natara Nopparatayapon; Violette Wautier; Ploy Horwang; Siraphun Wattanajinda; Chutimon Chuengcharoensukying
- Cinematography: Phaklao Jiraungkoonkun
- Edited by: Chonlasit Upanigkit
- Music by: Vichaya Vatanasapt
- Production companies: Houseton; Jet Tone Films; Block 2 Pictures
- Distributed by: Jet Tone Films (International); GDH 559 (Thailand)
- Release dates: January 28, 2021 (Sundance); February 10, 2022 (Thailand)
- Running time: 136 minutes
- Countries: China; Hong Kong; Thailand
- Language: Thai

One for the Road (Thai: วันสุดท้าย..ก่อนบายเธอ, RTGS: Wan Sutthai..Kon Bai Thoe, lit. 'The last day..before goodbye you') is a 2021 Thai-language drama film directed by Nattawut Poonpiriya and produced by Wong Kar-wai. It is a Chinese/Hong Kong/Thai co-production, and is written by Puangsoi Aksornsawang, Nottapon Boonprakob and Nattawut Poonpiriya. The film stars Thanapob Leeratanakajorn, Natara Nopparatayapon, Ploy Horwang, Siraphun Wattanajinda, Violette Wautier and Chutimon Chuengcharoensukying.

The film had its world premiere at the 2021 Sundance Film Festival on January 28, 2021 and won the Special Jury Award for Creative Vision in the World Cinema Dramatic Competition. The film was selected as the Thai entry for Best International Feature Film at the 95th Academy Awards.

== Plot ==
The story is divided into “A” and “B” side of a cassette tape.

A (Aood) side: Boss, a womanizer and bartender in New York, receives a phone call one night from his estranged best friend, Aood. Aood is dying from leukemia, and asks Boss to see him in Thailand to fulfill his last wish.

Upon arrival, Boss finds out that Aood simply wants to revisit people from his past relationships. While they embark on a road trip, Aood’s past is shown. Aood had a string of relationships in New York that ended miserably because of his self-centered personality. His last girlfriend, Alice, was the main cause of his stained relationship with Boss when Aood decided to return to Thailand with her, breaking their promise about opening a bar with Boss. Realizing that he is dying, Aood has decided to patch things up with his ex-lovers before letting them go for good. However, all of his reunion, saved for Alice, turn bitter as they vowed never to see him again from the pain he caused them. Aood finally fulfills his mission, despite his deteriorating health, and asks to visit Boss's place for the first time.

B (Boss) side: Boss brings Aood to his family’s luxurious hotel in Pattaya, where he hasn't come back for ten years. Aood then confesses his true last wish and why he wants Boss to come back.

The story is then told in flashbacks. Ten years prior, Boss’s mother (Tak) remarried to a wealthy widower, whose family promptly alienated Boss. He met Prim, an aspiring bartender, at a hotel's bar owned by his stepfather and they began their relationship. Tak soon wanted Boss to study aboard, to his dismay. Thinking that the family just wanted him gone, he was disdainful towards them, but soon changed his mind as Prim wanted to go to New York to pursue her bartending career.

Boss and Prim lived together in an expensive apartment in New York. Prim got her part-time job in Thai restaurant where Aood was working, while Boss was just living idly. Aood and Prim soon became close, bonding over their shared favorite Thai radio program. Aood introduced Prim to his bar owner senior, who offered Prim a job and promised he would send Prim to the bartending competition in Las Vegas. Meanwhile, Prim and Boss’s relationship started turning south, as Prim became more occupied while Boss was overly needy. Boss angrily confronted Prim one night after he found the receipt of roughly 36,000 USD trashed in their bin. Prim tearfully admitted that Tak secretly gave her money so she could take Boss to New York. Feeling betrayed, Boss broke up with Prim and never saw her again.

Prim then asked to stay in Aood's place temporarily. She took a month off from her waitress work, but Aood noticed Boss still waiting for her on the street every night. Before Prim left to Las Vegas, Aood confessed his feelings for her, but she turned him down as she still loved Boss dearly. Out of anger and jealousy, Aood accused Prim for leading him on and that she deemed him inferior because of Boss's wealth. Aood also lied to Boss that Prim moved to another state with her new American boyfriend. A devastated Boss ended up drunkenly passing out in the subway where he got robbed by a group of teenagers. Aood decided to help him out of guilt, and Boss later asked him to live in his apartment.

Some time later, Tak visited Boss and gave him money that Prim had returned. Aood and Boss planned to use it to open a bar together. However, Boss, still deeply scarred from his relationship with Prim, wasted his life away with parties and women. Aood eventually moved back to Thailand with Alice as he was fed up with how Boss’s dream of opening a bar never materialized for years. To Boss’s surprise, Aood reveals in the present that Prim did return to New York before he left. Now a professional bartender, Prim created “Pattaya Sour” drink, naming it after the place where she met her soulmate. Aood intentionally did not let Boss know about her return, as he wished Boss to suffer and he never thought Boss deserved her. His final wish is to return Prim to Boss, and to confess that he destroyed Boss's life out of jealousy. Boss leaves in anger, but not before Aood gives him a contact of Prim’s new bar.

Three months later, Aood has died from his cancer. Tak visits Boss at his bar and leaves Aood’s final message for him. In the message, Aood asked for Boss’s forgiveness and said that he was thankful for a short amount of time he got to experience what being like Boss was. Flashbacks reveal that his ex-lovers all moved on with their lives, and Aood seemed content for his chances of final goodbye. He desired to rekindle Boss’s relationship with Prim again, wishing that should he get well, he would drive Boss to see her whether he likes it or not.

Boss returns to his hometown in Thailand and finds Prim working at the seaside bar called "One for the Road". They smile at each other, before Boss orders "Pattaya Sour" from her. Boss looks away and sees a vision of Aood, who smiles silently at his friend, before driving off into the distance.

== Cast ==
The cast include:

- Thanapob Leeratanakajorn as Boss
- Natara Nopparatayapon as Aood
- Violette Wautier as Prim
- Chutimon Chuengcharoensukying as Noona
- Ploi Horwang as Alice
- Noon Siraphun as Roong

== Release ==
The film had its world premiere at the 2021 Sundance Film Festival on January 28, 2021.

In 2022, the Thai distribution rights to the film were acquired by GDH 559 and it set to be released in Thai cinemas on February 10.

=== Critical response ===
On Rotten Tomatoes, the film has an approval rating of 67% based on reviews from 33 critics, with an average rating of 6.5/10. The website's critics consensus reads, "It's overlong and uneven, but One for the Road may still satisfy viewers in the mood for a road trip movie with mortality on its mind."

== See also ==
- List of Thai submissions for the Academy Award for Best International Feature Film
- List of submissions to the 95th Academy Awards for Best International Feature Film
