= Chutimon Chuengcharoensukying =

Thai actress and model (born 1996)

- ชุติมณฑน์ จึงเจริญสุขยิ่ง
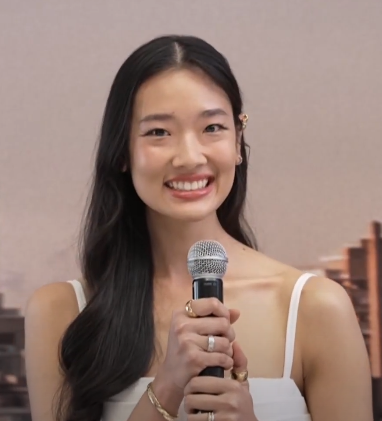
- Chutimon in 2022
- Born: 2 February 1996 (age 30); Bangkok, Thailand
- Other name: Aokbab (ออกแบบ)
- Education: Chulalongkorn University Faculty of Fine and Applied Arts
- Occupations: Actress; model
- Years active: 2013–present
- Notable work: Bad Genius
- Height: 5 ft 9.3 in (1.76 m)

Chutimon Chuengcharoensukying (Thai: ชุติมณฑน์ จึงเจริญสุขยิ่ง, IPA: [t͡ɕʰú.tì.mon t͡ɕɯŋ.t͡ɕà.rɤːn.sùk.jîŋ]; born 2 February 1996), nicknamed Aokbab (Thai: ออกแบบ; RTGS: Ok-baep; IPA: [ʔɔ̀ːk.bɛ̀ːp]), is a Thai model and actress best known for her role as Lynn in the 2017 film Bad Genius. In 2024, she won the International Emmy Award for Best Actress for her performance in the television film Hunger.

== Early life and education ==
Chutimon was born on 2 February 1996 in Bangkok, Thailand to a Thai Chinese family. Her Chinese surname is Zhuang (莊). She studied at the Faculty of Fine and Applied Arts at Chulalongkorn University. Her nickname is "Aokbab", which means "to design" in Thai.

== Career ==
Chutimon started modelling at age 15. She was the first Thai model featured in Harper's Bazaar UK, October 2013 in "A shadow of a jade empire" theme. She also featured in music videos such as "Unfriend" by Helmetheads and "Pajhonpai" by Mrs.Slave. She had an important role in the viral short film by Nawapol Thamrongrattanarit, "Thank you for Sharing". Chutimon's first acting role was as Lynn in the film Bad Genius in 2017, for which she received praise, and garnered popularity, becoming the first Thai actress to win the Screen International Rising Star Asia award, at the 16th New York Asian Film Festival 2017.

== Filmography ==
=== Film ===
Year	Title	Role	Notes	Ref.
2016	Thank You For Sharing	Jook Chanee	Short film	
2017	Bad Genius	Lynn		
2017	Die Tomorrow	Som		
2018	We Will Not Die Tonight	Grace		
2019	Happy Old Year	Jean		
2021	One for the Road	Noona		
2021	Love Story	Xiao Lin		
2022	Faces of Anne	Anne		
2023	Hunger	Aoy		
2023	E-Sarn Zombie	Tonnun		
2026	Mutelu	Bua		

=== Television series ===
Year	Title	Role	Network	Ref.
2017	Love Books Love Series: Dark Fairy Tale	Gorya	GMM25	
2018	Muang Maya Live The Series :Mayalove online	Khem Khanita Kunaphiphat	ONE 31	
2019	Sleepless Society: Khun Fan Luang	Aya	ONE 31	
2022	Bad Romeo	Lita	Channel 3	
2023	DELETE	Orn	Netflix	
2025	Mobius (不眠日)	Supporting Role	IQIYI	
TBA	Daredevil Treasure Hunter (绝地勘宝师)	Xue Li	TBA	

== Awards and nominations ==
Year	Award	Category	Nominated work	Result	Ref.
2017	16th New York Asian Film Festival	Screen International Rising Star Asia Award	Bad Genius	Won	
2017	3rd Maya Awards	Best Actress in a Leading Role (Film)	Bad Genius	Won	
2017	1st PIFFA Supreme Awards	Best Actress	Bad Genius	Won	
2017	iQIYI Screaming Night	Best New Film Performer of the Year	Bad Genius	Won	
2017	2nd International Film Festival & Awards • Macao	Variety Asian Stars: Up Next Award	Bad Genius	Won	
2018	2nd Asian Brilliant Stars Awards	Best Actress	Bad Genius	Won	
2018	27th Suphannahong National Film Awards	Best Actress	Bad Genius	Won	
2018	Sanook! Top Vote of the Year	Rising Star Award	Bad Genius	Nominated	
2018	9th Bioscope Awards	Performance of the Year	Bad Genius	Won	
2018	12th Asian Film Awards	Best Newcomer	Bad Genius	Won	
2018	26th Bangkok Critics Assembly Awards	Best Actress	Bad Genius	Won	
2018	15th Starpics Thai Films Awards	Best Actress	Bad Genius	Won	
2018	1st Thailand Master Youth	Youth Role Model Award	—N/a	Won	
2018	8th Thai Film Director Awards	Best Actress	Bad Genius	Won	
2018	12th Kazz Awards	Popular New Actress	Bad Genius	Won	
2018	12th Kazz Awards	Top Girl of the Year	Bad Genius	Won	
2018	7th Daradaily The Great Awards	Best Film Actress of the Year	Bad Genius	Nominated	
2018	31st Saraswati Royal Awards	Best Actress	Bad Genius	Won	
2018	31st Saraswati Royal Awards	Popular Actress	Bad Genius	Nominated	
2018	10th Siam Dara Star Awards	Best Actress (Film)	Bad Genius	Nominated	
2018	10th Siam Dara Star Awards	Best Rising Star	Bad Genius	Nominated	
2018	58th Asia-Pacific Film Festival	Best Actress	Bad Genius	Nominated	
2018	58th Asia-Pacific Film Festival	Best New Actress	Bad Genius	Won	
2018	6th Thailand Headlines Person of the Year Awards	Culture and Entertainment – Actress / Model	Bad Genius	Won	
2018	12th OK! Awards	Female Rising Star	Bad Genius	Nominated	
2018	12th OK! Awards	Spotlight	Bad Genius	Won	
2018	1st ET Thailand Awards	Best New Generation	Bad Genius	Nominated	
2019	45th E! People's Choice Awards	The Most Inspiring Asian Woman of 2019	—N/a	Nominated	
2020	4th JOOX Thailand Music Awards	Most Stylish Women	—N/a	Nominated	
2020	16th Kom Chad Luek Awards	Best Actress (Film)	Happy Old Year	Won	
2020	17th Starpics Thai Films Awards	Best Actress	Happy Old Year	Won	
2020	28th Bangkok Critics Assembly Awards	Best Actress	Happy Old Year	Nominated	
2020	10th Thai Film Director Awards	Best Actress	Happy Old Year	Nominated	
2020	14th Asian Film Awards	Best Actress	Happy Old Year	Nominated	
2020	14th Kazz Awards	Popular Female Teenage	—N/a	Nominated	
2021	29th Thailand National Film Association Awards	Best Leading Actress	Happy Old Year	Nominated	
2024	52nd International Emmy Awards	Best Actress	Hunger	Won	
