= The Voice Thailand season 2 =

The Voice Thailand
- Season 2
- Hosted by: Kob Songsit; Joy Rinranee
- Coaches: Saharat Sangkapreechat; Jennifer Kim; Joey Boy; Apiwat Eurthavornsuk
- Winner: Rangson Panyaruean
- Runner-up: Wanlika Kasawaphitak

Release
- Original network: Channel 3
- Original release: 8 September – 15 December 2013

Season chronology
- ← Previous; Season 1 Next → Season 3

The second series of The Voice เสียงจริงตัวจริง ( also known as The Voice Thailand ) on 8 September 2013. The show was hosted by Kob Songsit and Joy Rinranee on Channel 3.

== Teams ==
Colour key

- Winner
- Runners-up
- Third/Fourth place
- Eliminated in the Live shows
- Eliminated in the Knockouts
- Artist was stolen by another coach in the Battle rounds (Name is strike-throughed)
- Eliminated in the Battles

Coach	Top 49				
Kong Saharat					
Kong Saharat	Tangmo Wanlika	Keng Natthida	Sam Soemsat	Gap Chanowat	Nick Yada
Kong Saharat	Opal Praput	Tah Keeta	Ump Napat	Golf Loedwit	~~Ohn Kannapong~~
Kong Saharat	Num Sittha	~~Fangkhaw Natcha~~	Kaew Kittima	Tik Phatthreerat	
Jennifer Kim					
Jennifer Kim	Nat Kritsada	Nan Lalita	Fangkaw Natcha	Bank Watchara	Lookpeach Rapiporn
Jennifer Kim	Golf Suradet	Palm Nitipum	Opal Achiraya	~~Gap Chanowat~~	Pack Wiritpon
Jennifer Kim	Nam Praphatson	Ink Chanita	Pupe Phanunat	Bean & Pin	Jenny Jenifer
Joey Boy					
Joey Boy	Kit Kittinan	Pala Thanaphon	Fon Warunee	Fah Thikhamporn	Violette Wautier
Joey Boy	Rimmy Nida	Ohn Kannapong	Puifai Chawanlak	Som Chanyanat	Ann Yuppadee
Joey Boy	~~Pueng Pemika~~	Walnut Saitip	~~Ben Panjaporn~~	~~Nan Lalita~~	
Apiwat Eurthavornsuk					
Apiwat Eurthavornsuk	Songkran Rangsan	May Fonpa	Tukta Jamaporn	Ohm Naphat	Poy Auengpoy
Apiwat Eurthavornsuk	Ben Panjaporn	Gift Aunchittha	Pueng Pemika	Dream Patthraporn	Khawfang & Milk
Apiwat Eurthavornsuk	~~Tah Keeta~~	Pla Suchaya	Pete Pitipong	~~Puifai Chawanlak~~	

== The Blind Auditions ==
Key
– Coach hit his/her "I WANT YOU" button
– Artist eliminated with no coach pressing his or her "I WANT YOU" button
– Artist defaulted to this coach's team
– Artist elected to join this coach's team

=== Episode 1 ===
The first blind audition episode was broadcast on 8 September 2013.

Group performance: The Voice Thailand Coaches – "คิดถึงฉันไหมเวลาที่เธอ"

Order	Artist	Song	Coach's and artist's choices			
Order	Artist	Song	Kong	Kim	Joey	Stamp
1	Lookpeach, Rapeeporn Tantrakorn _{Age 20, Bangkok}	"สบตา"	—	✔	—	—
2	Pat, Wiritpon Kamonchaiyaninchakun _{Age 25, Samutsakorn}	"You Give Me Something"	✔	✔	—	—
3	Fah, Thikamporn Palitaporn _{Age 19, Bangkok}	"สาวบางโพ"	✔	—	✔	✔
4	Ohm, Naphat Sirinin Age 22, Bangkok	"Valerie"	✔	✔	✔	✔
5	Aum, Naphat Kaewduangjai Age 18, Nonthaburi	"Heartbreak Hotel"	✔	—	✔	—
6	Kaem, Paesakaw Saengsawang Age 22, Udonthani	"เพลงลูกกรุง"	—	—	—	—
7	Kit, Kittinan Chinsamran Age 30, Bangkok	"My Way"	—	—	✔	✔
8	Num, Sittha Niyommo Age 21, Surin	"ตุ๊กต	✔	—	—	✔
9	Man, Thanarat Kittayakarn _{Age 40, Phuket}	"คนไม่มีวาสนา"	—	—	—	—
10	Rimmi, Nida Duwa _{Age 23, Bangkok}	"Lady Marmalade"	✔	✔	✔	✔

=== Episode 2 ===
The second blind audition episode was broadcast on 15 September 2013.

Order	Artist	Song	Coach's and artist's choices			
Order	Artist	Song	Kong	Kim	Joey	Stamp
1	Khawfang, Kanthira Songprakhon _{Age 22, Buriram}	"Just Give Me a Reason"	—	—	—	—
2	Opal, Praputh Phimphama Age 26, Bangkok	"ทุกสิ่ง"	✔	✔	—	—
3	Gift, Aunchittha Pongsiriyaporn _{Age 22, Bangkok}	"คิดถึง"	—	✔	✔	✔
4	Pipe, Thanapon Phitaksakorn _{Age 22, Chiangmai}	"รถของเล่น"	—	—	—	—
5	Nan, Lalita Juewatthanakit _{Age 25, Bangkok}	"New York"	—	—	✔	—
6	Bell, Thanchai Wipornsathit _{Age 28, Bangkok}	"รอฉันวันรักเธอ"	—	—	—	—
7	Jenny, Jennifer Lakgrand _{Age 21, Bangkok}	"Somewhere Only We Know"	✔	✔	✔	—
8	Kaew, Kittima Pulwong _{Age 30, Unknown}	"รักข้ามขอบฟ้า"		—	—	
9	Songkran, Rangson Panyaruean _{Age 23, Nakhon Ratchasima}	"เจ้าตาก"	—	—	—	✔
10	Ink, Chanita Krathong _{Age 21, Chanthaburi}	"เดียวดายกลางสายลม"	—	✔	—	—
11	Tukta, Jamaporn Saengthong _{Age 25, Bangkok}	"Kimiga Ireba Sorede ii"	✔	—	✔	✔

=== Episode 3 ===
The third blind audition episode was broadcast on 22 September 2013.

Order	Artist	Song	Coach's and artist's choices			
Order	Artist	Song	Kong	Kim	Joey	Stamp
1	Ohn, Kannapong Tharakhet _{Age 31, Pathumthanee}	"โกหกหน้าตาย"	✔	—	—	—
2	Ben, Panjaporn Eiamwijan Age 22, Buriram	"Fire"	✔	—	✔	✔
3	Poy, Auengpoy Bunma _{Age 20, Suphanburi}	"ติ๋ม"	—	—	—	
4	Fangkhaw, Natcha Jittanon _{Age 23, Chanthaburi}	"Love of My Life"	✔	✔	✔	✔
5	Tan, Thatsanaphan Maneejan _{Age 28, Chiangmai}	"ฉันอยู่ตรงนี้"	—	—	—	—
6	Nick, Nichapith Phalaburee _{Age Unknown, Unknown}	"Hot Stuff"	—	—	—	—
7	Ming, Kanyapak Khan _{Age Unknown, Unknown}	"Rolling in the Deep"	—	—	—	—
8	Golf, Kittipob Ratchakom _{Age 18, Bangkok}	"ที่แล้วก็แล้วไป"	—	—	—	—
9	Bean, Naphason Chaiyapornrueangdet Pin, Pinthuson Ngampornwipa _{Age 17 and Age 16, Bangkok}	"เธอยัง..."	—	✔	—	—
10	Tah, Keeta Intharasut _{Age 25, Bangkok}	"Smoke on The Water"	✔	✔	✔	✔
11	Surapon Munmak _{Age 57, Bangkok}	"เสียวไส้"	—	—	—	—
12	Puifai, Chawanlak Direkwatthananukun _{Age 22, Bangkok}	"อย่างน้อย"	—	—	—	✔
13	Pala, Thanaphon Mahattanadul _{Age 33, Bangkok}	"The Blower's Daughter"	✔	✔	✔	✔

=== Episode 4 ===
The fourth blind audition episode was broadcast on 29 September 2013.

Order	Artist	Song	Coach's and artist's choices			
Order	Artist	Song	Kong	Kim	Joey	Stamp
1	Plam, Nitiphum, Phukritsana _{Age 24, Bangkok}	"Don't Love You No More"	✔	✔	—	—
2	Dream, Pattharaporn Changyot Age 18, Saraburi	"From Me to You"	✔	—	—	✔
3	Fon, Warunee Jantharasirirangsee _{Age 20, Nonthaburi}	"นาฬิกาเรือนเก่า"	✔	✔	✔	—
4	Tangmo, Wanlika Kasawaphitak _{Age 20, Bangkok}	"Ain't No Sunshine"	✔	—	—	✔
5	Doremon, Suphaporn Chuchatthai _{Age 30, Bangkok}	"Beat It"	—	—	—	—
6	Nat, Kritsada Phithakphatthanakun _{Age 30, Bangkok}	"Killing Me Softly"	✔	✔	✔	✔
7	Ann, Yuppadee Nuklin _{Age 32, Saratthanee}	"ทะเลใจ"	—	—	✔	—
8	Mia, Irin Thammasiriwat _{Age 30, Surin}	"Natural Woman"	—	—	—	—
9	Sam, Sermsartr Del Rosario _{Age 26, Bangkok}	"พลังรัก"	✔	—	—	✔
10	Tong, Piyapon Sonphakdee _{Age 23, Phichit}	"ใครจะเมตตา"	—	—	—	—
11	Vi, Violette Wautier _{Age 19, Bangkok}	"Leaving on a Jet Plane"	✔	✔	✔	✔

=== Episode 5 ===
The fifth blind audition episode was broadcast on 6 October 2013.

Order	Artist	Song	Coach's and artist's choices			
Order	Artist	Song	Kong	Kim	Joey	Stamp
1	Opal, Achiraya Suphalaknaree _{Age 20, Patumthanee}	"Scarborough Fair"	—	✔	—	—
2	Gap, Chanowat Phirisaisanti _{Age 25, Chiangmai}	"สมมุติ"	—	✔	—	—
3	Pangrom, Thawanrat Ninnoree _{Age 16, Samutsakorn}	"ขวัญเรียม"	—	—	—	—
4	Guitar, Phlengpraphan Kingthong _{Age 24, Bangkok}	"Haven't Met You Yet"	—	—	—	—
5	Nick, Yada Wongyeewa _{Age 27, Kanchanaburee}	"อยู่อย่างเหงาๆ"	✔	✔	✔	✔
6	Walnut, Saitip Wiwatthanapathapee _{Age 25, Bangkok}	"ใจรัก"	—	—	✔	—
7	Keng, Natthida Sriyanon _{Age 46, Bangkok}	"I'm Outta Love"	✔	—	✔	✔
8	Bank, Wangchara Kanyaporn _{Age 26, Chiangmai}	"รู้"	—	✔	—	—
9	Khawfang, Prakarang Sangamathong Milk, Phenphisut Phuangsuwan _{Age 23 & Age 24, Phayao}	"What You Know"	—	—	—	✔
10	May, Fonpha Pramot Na Ayutthaya _{Age 32, Bangkok}	"Come Away With Me"	✔	—	—	✔

=== Episode 6 ===
The last blind audition episode was broadcast on 13 October 2013.

Order	Artist	Song	Coach's and artist's choices			
Order	Artist	Song	Kong	Kim	Joey	Stamp
1	Tik, Pattareerat Sanguansak _{Age 25, Bangkok}	"ฝุ่น"	✔	—	—	—
2	Golf, Suradet Wathanasunthonrakun _{Age 26, Bangkok}	"เธอคือความฝัน"	—	✔	—	—
3	Tonsom, Thitirath Waewpradit _{Age 40, Bangkok}	"Golden Eye"	—	—	—	—
4	Som, Chanyanat Phuwachotphipat _{Age 23, Bangkok}	"ตัดใจไม่ลง"	—	—	✔	—
5	Golf, Laedwit Chanikom _{Age 32, Udonthanee}	"Use Somebody"	✔	—	—	—
6	Pla Suchaya Thongtan _{Age 22, Phangnga}	"Kiss Me"	—	✔	✔	✔
7	Peat, Pitipong Phasakyuet _{Age 27, Bangkok}	"Play That Funky Music"	—	—	—	✔
8	Pupe Phanunat Bunritchok _{Age 32, Khonkean}	"Part of Your World"	—	✔	—	—
9	Nam, Praphatson Tanthisiri _{Age 28, Unknown}	"ทำได้เพียง"	—	✔	—	—
10	Pueng, Pemika Tonawanik _{Age 28, Bangkok}	"เรามีเรา"	—	—	✔	—

== Battle Rounds ==
This year's battle rounds featured a new "steal" twist. After each battle round the losing artist then pitched to the other three coaches on why they should join their team. It was then up to the coaches (who have a limited amount of time) to press their red button to steal the artist. They could press their button as many times as they liked but were only allowed to steal two artists. If more than one coach wanted to steal the same artist then it was up to the artist to decide which team to join.

The battle round advisors were Kong working with Pu Aunchiree,
Kim with Co Mr.Saxman,
Joey boy with Ben Charatip
and Stamp with Kai Suthee.

=== Episode 7-10: Battle Rounds ===
Battle Rounds was broadcast on 20 October 2013, 27 October 2013, 3 November 2013 and 10 November 2013.

– Coach hit his/her "I WANT YOU" button
– Artist defaulted to this coaches team
– Artist elected to join this coaches team
– Battle winner
– Battle loser
- Battle loser but was saved by another coach

Date	Order	Team	Artists			Song	Coaches and artists choices			
Date	Order	Team	Artists			Song	Kong	Kim	Joey	Stamp
Episode 7; 20 October 2013	1	Kim	Bank Watchara	Jenny Jenifer		"When I Was Your Man"	-	—	-	-
Episode 7; 20 October 2013	2	Stamp	May Fonpha	Puifai Chawanlak		"ชั่วฟ้าดินสลาย"	-	-		—
Episode 7; 20 October 2013	3	Kong	Sam Soemsat	Golf Loedwit		"ค่อย ค่อย พูด"	—	-	-	-
Episode 7; 20 October 2013	4	Kim	Lokpeach Rapeeporn	Bean & Pin		"วอน"	-	—	-	-
Episode 7; 20 October 2013	5	Stamp	Gift Aunchittha	Pit Pitipong		"รักไม่ยอมเปลี่ยนแปลง"	-	-	-	—
Episode 7; 20 October 2013	6	Joey	Rimmy Nida	Nan Lalita		"Like a Virgin"	-		—	-
Episode 8; 27 October 2013	1	Kim	Opal Achiraya	Pupe Phanunat		"Bring Me to Life"	-	—	-	-
Episode 8; 27 October 2013	2	Kong	Opal Praput	Ohn Kannapong		"อยู่ต่อเลยได้ไหม"	—	-		-
Episode 8; 27 October 2013	3	Stamp	Tukta Jamaporn	Pla Suchaya		"ไม่บอกเธอ"	-	-	—	—
Episode 8; 27 October 2013	4	Joey	Kit Kittinan	Ben Panjaporn		"Time of My Life"	-	-	—	
Episode 8; 27 October 2013	5	Joey	Fon Warunee	Walnut Saitip		"แค่คุณ"	-	-	—	-
Episode 8; 27 October 2013	6	Stamp	Songkran Rangsan	Tah Keeta		"ยอม"			*	—
Episode 9; 3 November 2013	1	Kim	Golf Suradet	Nam Praphatson	Ink Chanita	"อยากหยุดเวลา"	-	—	—	-
Episode 9; 3 November 2013	2	Kong	Aum Naphat	Num Sittha		"อมพระมาพูด"	—	-	—	-
Episode 9; 3 November 2013	3	Joey	Fah Thikamporn	Pueng Pemika		"ขอใจเธอแลกเบอร์โทร"	-	-	—	
Episode 9; 3 November 2013	4	Stamp	Ohm Naphat	Khawfang & Milk		"คิดฮอด"	-	-	—	—
Episode 9; 3 November 2013	5	Joey	Ve Veolet	Ann Yuppadee		"คุกเข่า"	-	-	—	—
Episode 9; 3 November 2013	6	Kong	Keng Natthida	Fangkhaw Natcha		"Saving All My Love For You"	—		—	—
Episode 10; 10 November 2013	1	Kong	Nick Yada	Kaew Kittima		"กลับคำเสีย"	—	—	—	—
Episode 10; 10 November 2013	2	Kim	Palm Nitipum	Pack Wiritpon		"โปรดเถิดดวงใจ"	-	—	—	—
Episode 10; 10 November 2013	3	Stamp	Poy Auengpoy	Dream Patthraporn		"แรงดึงดูด"	-	—	—	—
Episode 10; 10 November 2013	4	Kong	Tangmo Wanlika	Tik Phatthreerat		"แตกหัก"	—	—	—	—
Episode 10; 10 November 2013	5	Kim	Nat Kritsada	Gap Chanowat		"Me and Mrs. Jones"		—	—	—
Episode 10; 10 November 2013	6	Joey	Pala Thanapon	Som Chanyanat		"ชัดเจน"	—	—	—	—

- Despite having used his two steals already, Joey still pressed his button.

== Knock outs ==
– Knockout winner
– Eliminated artist

=== Episode 11-12: Knockouts ===
Knockouts were broadcast on 17 November 2013 and 24 November 2013
Group performance: The Voice Thailand Coach - มันคงเป็นความรัก, ลึกสุดใจ, ร้ายก็รัก, สายลม

Date	Order	Team	Song	Artists		Song
Episode 11; 17 November 2013	1	Joey	"ภาวนา"	Fon Warunee	Puifai Chawanlak	"แสนรัก"
Episode 11; 17 November 2013	2	Kim	"สักวันหนึ่ง"	Opal Achiraya	Fangkaw Natcha	"ตะวันลับฟ้า"
Episode 11; 17 November 2013	3	Joey	"ไอ้หนุ่มผมยาว"	Kit Kittinan	Ohn Kannapong	"ฉันดีใจที่มีเธอ"
Episode 11; 17 November 2013	4	Kim	"Without You"	Plam Nitipum	Nat Kitsada	"You've Got A Friend"
Episode 11; 17 November 2013	5	Joey	"Emotion"	Rimmy Nida	Fah Thikhamporn	"Hopelessly Devoted To You"
Episode 11; 17 November 2013	6	Kim	"เล่นของสูง"	Bang Watchara	Golf Suradet	"สุดใจ"
Episode 11; 17 November 2013	7	Joey	"99 Problem"	Ve Veolet	Pala Thanapon	"สบายดี"
Episode 11; 17 November 2013	8	Kim	"ฉันไม่ใช่นางเอก"	Nan Lalita	Lokpeach Rapiporn	"Titanium"
Episode 12; 24 November 2013	1	Stamp	"A Thousand Years"	May Fonpa	Pueng Pemika	"Let's Stay together
Episode 12; 24 November 2013	2	Kong	"ล้มบ้างก็ได้"	Gap Chanowat	Nick Yada	"Let It be"
Episode 12; 24 November 2013	3	Stamp	"Apologize"	Songkram Rangsan	Gift Aunchittha	"Butterfly"
Episode 12; 24 November 2013	4	Kong	"ไว้ใจ"	Keng Natthida	Opal Praput	"I Won't Give Up"
Episode 12; 24 November 2013	5	Stamp	"Stand by Me"	Ohm Napat	Ben Panjapornเ	"We Found Love"
Episode 12; 24 November 2013	6	Kong	"ผิดที่ไว้ใจ"	Tah Keeta	Sam Soemsat	"We are The Champions"
Episode 12; 24 November 2013	7	Stamp	"ดาว"	Poy Auengpoy	Tukta Jamaporn	"Angel"
Episode 12; 24 November 2013	8	Kong	"Jailhouse Rock"	Up Napat	Tangmo Wanlika	"And I Am Telling You I'm Not Going"

== Live shows ==
=== Episode 13: Live Playoff, Week 1 ===
Broadcast on 7 December 2013

– Advanced artist
– Eliminated artist

Order	Team	Artist	Song	Public Voting	Result
1	Kong	Tangmo Wanlika	If I Were A Boy / You Oughta Know	35%	Advanced
2	Kong	Gap Chanowat	คนของเธอ	12%	Eliminated
3	Kong	Sam Soemsat	ไหนว่าจะไม่หลอกกัน	20%	Eliminated
4	Kong	Keng Natthida	Rollin In The Deep	33%	Eliminated
5	Kim	Bank Watchara	คนไม่เข้าตา	13%	Eliminated
6	Kim	Fangkaw Natcha	สาวรำวง	28%	Eliminated
7	Kim	Nan Lalita	เสือ	29%	Eliminated
8	Kim	Nat Kritsada	กันและกัน	30%	Advanced

Non-competition performances
Order	Performers	Song
1	Kong and Kong's member	"Imagine "
2	Kim and Kim's member	"One Night Only"

=== Episode 14: Live Playoff, Week 2 ===
Broadcast on 8 December 2013

– Advanced artist
– Eliminated artist

Order	Team	Artist	Song	Public Voting	Result
1	Stamp	Ohm Naphat	ลืมไม่ลง	20%	Eliminated
2	Stamp	Tukta Jamaporn	ประวัติศาสตร์	22%	Eliminated
3	Stamp	May Fonpa	ผ้าเช็ดหน้า	26%	Eliminated
4	Stamp	Songkran Rangsan	ฉันไม่ใช่	32%	Advanced
5	Joey	Fah Thikhamporn	สติ๊กเกอร์	17%	Eliminated
6	Joey	Kit Kittinan	ชัยชนะ	33%	Advanced
7	Joey	Fon Warunee	You Light Up My Life	18%	Eliminated
8	Joey	Pala Thanaporn	ทำร้าย	31%	Eliminated

Non-competition performances
Order	Performers	Song
1	The Voice Season 1 and Auncharee JingKhadeekit	"รัก"
2	Stamp and Stamp's member	"ดอกไม้พลาสติก"
3	Joey and Joey's member	"พ่อแง แม่งอน"

=== Episode 15: Final ===
Broadcast on 15 December 2013

- Winner
- Runner-up
- Third/fourth place

Team	Artist	Order	Song	Order	Song that artist sing with coach	Result
Kong	Tangmo Wanlika	6	"นักร้องบ้านนอก/ราชินีแห่งท้องทุ่ง"	1	"ช่วงที่ดีที่สุด"	Runner-Up
Kim	Nat Kritsada	2	"I believe I can fly"	5	"The Moon Represents My Heart"	Third/fourth place
Joey	Kit Kittinan	3	"บทเรียน"	8	"ราตรีสวัสดิ์"	Third/fourth place
Stamp	Songkran Rangsan	7	"รักคงยังไม่พอ"	4	"จันทร์เจ้า"	Winner

Non-competition performances
Order	Artist	Song
1	Khawnjit Sriprajan and 4 finalist of The Voice Season 2	"Live And Learn"
