= Weird Genius =

Indonesian EDM and synth-pop group

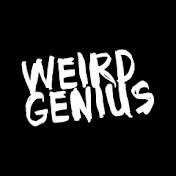

Background information
- Origin: Jakarta, Indonesia
- Genres: EDM; Synth-pop; Electropop; Pop music
- Instruments: Digital audio workstation; keyboards; synthesizer
- Years active: 2016–present
- Labels: Astralwerks; Universal; Barong Family; Monstercat
- Members: Reza Oktovian; Eka Gustiwana; Roy Leonard
- Past members: Billy Taner; Gerald Liu

Weird Genius is an Indonesian DJ and record production group based Pop music, EDM, and synth-pop consisting of three members are Reza Oktovian, Eka Gustiwana, and Roy Leonard Soewarno. This group was formed in 2016 and released their first song in 2017 with the title DPS.

== History ==
Weird Genius started composing music together in 2016. Previously, they already had their respective projects. As soon as they decided to join, all their abilities poured fully into this collaborative endeavor. They take inspiration from anywhere about love to life, social to gaming. When asked about the description of Weird Genius' music, they described it as hard, upbeat, pumping, crazy-drop. This style of music that they deliberately built from the beginning.

However. on 25 September 2019, Billy Taner decided to leave the group and was eventually replaced by Gerald Liu.

On 28 February 2020, Weird Genius release the song "Lathi" featuring Sara Fajira on YouTube and viral at social media specially on TikTok. Some of Weird Genius's achievements with their song "Lathi" in 2020 include: #1 on Spotify Indonesia Top 50, #2 on Spotify Viral Top 50 Global, #1 on Spotify Viral Top 50 Indonesia, #1 in iTunes Indonesia Top 200, #1 in Deezer Indonesia Top 300, #1 in JOOX Indonesia Top 100, #1 on Resso Top 30 Global, #1 on Resso Indonesia Top 20, #1 on TikTok Global 20, on #1 Shazam Chart Indonesia and topped song dates on some of the top radio stations in major cities in Indonesia.

On 30 June 2020, Spotify released a press release stating that the song "Lathi" has broken a new record as a local song that has topped the # 1 longest chart for 6 consecutive weeks on Spotify Indonesia's Top 50 Chart.

On 31 July 2020, Weird Genius have collaboration single with several international DJs to collaborate on music, including Yellow Claw featuring Reikko with the title track "Hush".

On 18 August 2020, Weird Genius officially signed with American record label Astralwerks for international music activities.

Weird Genius won Best of the Best Production Work, Best Sound Production Team, and Best Male/Female Solo Artist/Group/Dance Collaboration for the song "Lathi" at the 23rd Anugerah Musik Indonesia on 26 November 2020. The day after that, they released a collaborative song with League of Legends: Wild Rift, called "All In" and for vocals they collaborated with Singaporean singer, Tabitha Nauser.

On 4 December 2020, Weird Genius released a remixed version of "Lathi" consisting of three remixes by R3hab, Sihk, and RayRay.

On 5 February 2021, they released "Last Summer", a collaboration with Japanese producer Tokyo Machine and Canadian singer Lights via Monstercat. The accompanying animated music video for the track was later released on 24 May 2021.

On 10 September 2021, Weird Genius released "Future Ghost" featuring Thai-Belgian singer Violette Wautier.

On October 10, 2023, Weird Genius announced the departure of Gerald Liu through their official Instagram account, following his decision to pursue a solo music career. The announcement stated that Gerald Liu's final performance with the group would be on October 21, 2023, during the Playlist Festival in Bandung. Subsequently, Roy Leonard Soewarno, known as Roycdc, was introduced as a new member of Weird Genius, as revealed in an Instagram post showing a picture of the new lineup.

== Members ==
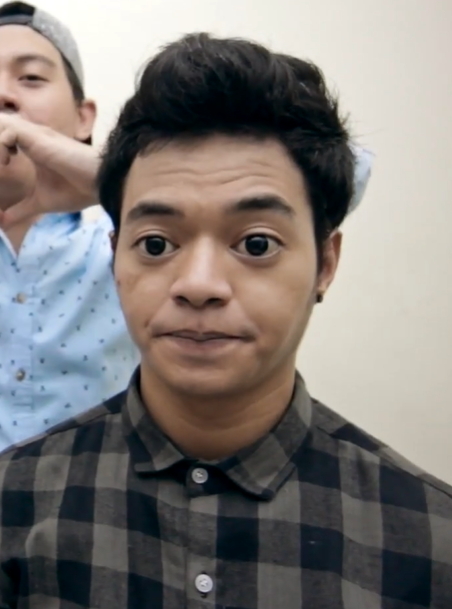
Oktovian in 2015

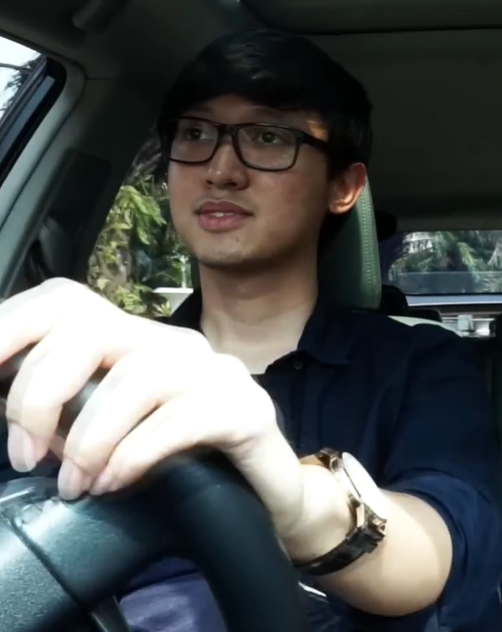
Gustiwana in 2017

Current

- Reza Oktovian, born 15 October 1987 – Founder (2016 – present)
- Eka Gustiwana, born 1 August 1989 – Record producer, keyboardist and synthesizer (2016 – present)
- Roycdc, born 7 May 1994 – Record producer and DJ mixer (2023 – present)

Former

- Billy Taner, born 10 March 1994 – Record producer and DJ mixer (2016 – 2019)
- Gerald Liu, born 10 February 1996 – Record producer and DJ mixer (2019 – 2023)

== Discography ==
=== Singles ===
Title	Year	Ref.
"DPS"	2017	
"Lunatic"^{(featuring Letty)}	2017	
"Big Bang"^{(featuring Letty)}	2018	
"Sweet Scar"^{(featuring Prince Husein)}	2018	
"Dreams"^{(with DOLF featuring Rochelle)}	2018	
"Irukandji"	2018	
"Last Dance"^{(featuring Daniel Rimaldi)}	2018	
"Flickshot"^{(featuring Charita Utami)}	2019	
"Velvet Thorns"^{(with Midnight Quickie)}	2019	
"Peanut Butter"	2019	
"Lathi"^{(featuring Sara Fajira)}	2020	
"Hush"^{(with Yellow Claw featuring Reikko)}	2020	
"All In"^{(featuring Tabitha Nausher)}	2020	
"Last Summer"^{(with Tokyo Machine featuring Lights)}	2021	
"Future Ghost"^{(featuring Violette Wautier)}	2021	
"Lonely"^{(with Yellow Claw featuring Novia Bachmid)}	2022	
"Sugar"^{(featuring Sarah de Warren)}	2023	

=== Remix albums ===
Title	Details
Flickshot (Remixes)	Released: 23 January 2020; Label: Self-released; Format: Digital download
Lathi (Remixes)	Released: 12 December 2020; Label: Astralwerks; Format: Digital download
Future Ghost (Remixes)	Released: 8 December 2021; Label: Astralwerks; Format: Digital download
Last Summer (The Remixes)	Released: 29 August 2022; Label: Monstercat; Format: Digital download

=== Remixes ===
List of remixes, showing year released and original artists
Title	Year	Original artist(s)
"Love In My Pocket"	2020	Rich Brian
"Why Do You Lie To Me"	2020	Topic, A7S, Lil Baby
"Runaway"	2021	R3hab, Sigala, JP Cooper
"Resister"	2021	Asca

== Concerts and tours ==
=== Headlining ===
- Velvet Thorns Tour (2019)
- Lathi Tour (2020)

=== Co-headlining ===
- Viral Fest Asia Festival Bangkok (2017)
- Soundrenaline Bali (2017)
- Yellow Claw’s Indonesian Tour (2018)
- Sky Garden Bali (2018)
- The Chainsmokers Live in Concert Jakarta (2018)
- SHVR Jakarta (2018 & 2019)

== Awards and achievements ==
Years	Award ceremony	Category	Nominatee(s)/work(s)	Result	Ref.
2018	Paranoia Awards 2018	Duo/Group DJ of the Year	Weird Genius	Nominated	
2019	Paranoia Awards 2019	Duo/Group DJ of the Year	Weird Genius	Won	
2020	23rd Anugerah Musik Indonesia	Best of the Best Production Work	"Lathi"	Won	
2020	23rd Anugerah Musik Indonesia	Best Collaboration Production Work	"Lathi"	Nominated	
2020	23rd Anugerah Musik Indonesia	Best Record Producer	Eka Gustiwana Putra, Gerald Prayogo Pangestu Wibowo, Reza Oktovian	Nominated	
2020	23rd Anugerah Musik Indonesia	Best Sound Production Team	Eka Gustiwana Putra, Gerald Prayogo Pangestu Wibowo, Reza Oktovian, Dhandy Annora	Won	
2020	23rd Anugerah Musik Indonesia	Best Male/Female Solo Artist/Group/Dance Collaboration	Weird Genius & Sara Fajira – "Lathi"	Won	
2020	TikTok Awards Indonesia 2020	Viral Song of the Year	"Lathi"	Nominated	
2021	24th Anugerah Musik Indonesia	Best Male/Female Solo Artist/Group/Dance Collaboration	Weird Genius & Reikko – "Hush"	Nominated	
