= BNK48: Girls Don't Cry =

- Girls Don't Cry movie poster
- บีเอ็นเคโฟร์ตีเอต: เกิร์ลดอนต์คราย
- Directed by: Nawapol Thamrongrattanarit
- Produced by: Vichai Matakul; Patcharin Surawattanapongs
- Starring: BNK48 First Generation
- Cinematography: Niramon Ross; Nawapol Thamrongrattanarit; Pacharin Surawatanapongs; Tanapol Keawdang
- Edited by: Nawapol Thamrongrattanarit
- Music by: Tongta Jitdee; Pokpong Jitdee
- Production companies: iAm; Salmon House; Plan B Media; Very Sad Pictures
- Distributed by: GDH 559
- Release dates: 16 March 2018 (Bangkok, Thailand)
- Running time: 108 minutes
- Country: Thailand
- Language: Thai language
- Box office: 13.35 million baht

BNK48: Girls Don't Cry (Thai: บีเอ็นเคโฟร์ตีเอต: เกิร์ลดอนต์คราย, lit. 'BNK48: Girls Don't Cry') Is a Thai documentary film about the first generation members of the all girl Thai idol group BNK48 from before the band's debut until after it gained fame. This film was directed by Nawapol Thamrongrattanarit, produced by iAM Films and Salmon House, and distributed by GDH 559. The film had its media screening event on 14 August 2018, at Paragon Cineplex Siam Paragon Shopping Center, and was scheduled to be released generally after two days.

== Synopsis ==
A documentary film about a Thai idol girl group, BNK48 originally adapting from a Japanese idol girl group, AKB48 open opportunity to ordinary teens to be selected into a controlled system and competitive concept. The concept of the band based on an ordinary, but dedicating character.In each single, only 16 from 26 members are selected to be part of it. So, every girl needs to put all of her effort in practicing and improving herself, also inevitably competing with each other, while trying to maintain their friendship.They soon realize that dedication is not the only key factor and hard work doesn’t always lead to success.

== Soundtrack ==
- Koisuru Fortune Cookie
- River
- Shonichi

== Film release ==
=== Cinema ===
The documentary film had its media premier at Paragon Cineplex at Siam Paragon on August 14, 2018, and was officially released to the public on August 16 in the same year. The movie earned 3.7 million baht on its opening day and 10.5 million baht in four days. The documentary film closed with a total income of 13.35 million baht.

In addition, this film was also selected to be screened in international film festivals abroad, including

- 43rd Pia Film Festival (PFF) at National Film Archive of Japan (England), Japan

=== Netflix and DVD ===
Netflix has licensed the film to be released on March 1, 2019. The DVD produced by Salmon House is available for pre-order at the Pre-DVD girls dont cry fan page.

== Awards and nominations ==
Year	Award	Category	Result	Ref(s)
2018	Honorary Best Creative Culture of the Year from the Ministry of Culture 2018	Creative Thai Film of the Year	Won	
2019	The 28th Suphannahong National Film Awards	Best Documentary	Nominated	
2019	15th Kom Chad Luek Award	Best movie	Nominated	
2019	15th Kom Chad Luek Award	Best Director (Nawapol Thamrongrattanarit)	Nominated	
2019	15th Kom Chad Luek Award	Popular Vote for Best Picture	Nominated	
2019	The 16th Starpics Thai Film Awards	Best Cinematography (Nawapol Thamrongrattanarit)	Nominated	
2019	The 16th Starpics Thai Film Awards	Best Documentary	Nominated	
2019	See The sound / SoundTrack Cologne 2019	Best Documentary Feature Award	Won	
