= Heart Attack (2015 film) =

- International release poster
- English: Heart Attack
- Thai: ฟรีแลนซ์..ห้ามป่วย ห้ามพัก ห้ามรักหมอ
- Directed by: Nawapol Thamrongrattanarit
- Screenplay by: Nawapol Thamrongrattanarit
- Produced by: Jira Maligool; Vanridee Pongsittisak; Chenchonnee Soonthonsaratul; Suwimon Techasupinan; Weerachai Yaikwawong
- Starring: Sunny Suwanmethanon; Davika Hoorne; Violette Wautier; Torpong Chantabubph
- Narrated by: Sunny Suwanmethanon
- Cinematography: Niramon Ross
- Edited by: Chonlasit Upanigkit
- Music by: Vichaya Vatanasapt; Hualampong Riddim
- Production company: Jorkwang Films
- Distributed by: GTH
- Release date: 3 September 2015 (Thailand)
- Running time: 126 minutes
- Country: Thailand
- Language: Thai
- Box office: $2,354,301

Heart Attack (Thai: ฟรีแลนซ์..ห้ามป่วย ห้ามพัก ห้ามรักหมอ, Freelance: Ham puay... Ham phak... Ham rak mor) is a 2015 Thai romantic comedy-drama film written and directed by Nawapol Thamrongrattanarit. It stars Sunny Suwanmethanon, Davika Hoorne, Violette Wautier and Torpong Chantabubph. The film follows Yoon, a workaholic 30-year-old freelancer who falls in love with his doctor. He suffered a heart attack when she was in progress but could not find a way to tell her about his undying love.

== Cast ==
- Sunny Suwanmethanon as Yoon
- Davika Hoorne as Imm
- Violette Wautier as Je
- Torpong Chantabubph as Peng
- Nottapon Boonprakob as Kai

Surattanawee Suviporn (Bo) and Kornpassorn Ratanameathanont (Joyce) of Triumphs Kingdom make cameo appearances as themselves. GTH's director Banjong Pisanthanakun makes a cameo appearance as a doctor. Another director, Adisorn Trisirikasem, also makes a cameo appearance as Je's boyfriend.

== Music ==
The score for Heart Attack was composed by Vichaya Vatanasapt at Hualumpong Riddim. The song "Vacation Time", sung by Violette Wautier and Stamp Apiwat Eurthavornsuk, was originally written and sung in English by the band "Part Time Musicians". The lyrics were rewritten into Thai by Apiwat Eurthavornsuk and Tarit Chiarakul.
