= Happy Old Year =

2019 film

- Film poster
- ฮาวทูทิ้ง ทิ้งอย่างไร..ไม่ให้เหลือเธอ
- Directed by: Nawapol Thamrongrattanarit
- Written by: Nawapol Thamrongrattanarit
- Produced by: Nawapol Thamrongrattanarit; Vanridee Pongsittisak; Suwimon Techasupinan; Chenchonnee Soonthornsaratul
- Starring: Chutimon Chuengcharoensukying; Sunny Suwanmethanont
- Cinematography: Niramon Ross
- Edited by: Chonlasit Upanigkit
- Music by: Jaithep Raroengjai
- Production companies: Happy Ending Film; Very Sad Pictures
- Distributed by: GDH 559
- Release date: 26 December 2019
- Running time: 113 minutes
- Country: Thailand
- Language: Thai

Happy Old Year (Thai title: ฮาวทูทิ้ง ทิ้งอย่างไร..ไม่ให้เหลือเธอ) is a 2019 Thai romantic drama film written and directed by Nawapol Thamrongrattanarit. The film had premiered in the "Voices Main Programme" section at the 49th International Film Festival Rotterdam. It was selected as the Thai entry for the Best International Feature Film at the 93rd Academy Awards, but it was not nominated.

== Plot ==
A woman named Jean (Chutimon Chuengcharoensukying) returns home to Bangkok after spending three years in Sweden, and begins to de-clutter her family's house by throwing away anything that has been lying around unused. However, she faces a great challenge when she comes across some items that belonged to her ex-boyfriend named Aim, (Sunny Suwanmethanont). Memories of their past came to Jean and Aim as they try to rekindle their friendship despite breaking up as a result of Jean's lifelong plans to be an interior designer.

== Cast ==
- Chutimon Chuengcharoensukying as Jean
- Sunny Suwanmethanont as Aim
- Sarika Sartsilpsupa as Mi
- Apasiri Chantrasmi as Jean's Mother
- Thirawat Ngosawang as Jay
- Patcha Kitchaicharoen as Pink

== Accolades ==
Date	Award	Category	Recipient(s) and nominee(s)	Result	Notes
30 December 2021	34th Golden Rooster Awards (China)	Best Foreign Language Film	Happy Old Year	Nominated	

== See also ==
- List of submissions to the 93rd Academy Awards for Best International Feature Film
- List of Thai submissions for the Academy Award for Best International Feature Film
