= Mary Is Happy, Mary Is Happy =

- Promotional release poster
- Directed by: Nawapol Thamrongrattanarit
- Screenplay by: Nawapol Thamrongrattanarit
- Based on: 410 tweets from @marylony
- Produced by: Aditya Assarat; Pacharin Surawatanapongs
- Starring: Patcha Poonpiriya; Chonnikan Netjui; Wasupol Kriangprapakit
- Cinematography: Phairat Khumwan
- Edited by: Chonlasit Upanigkit
- Music by: Somsiri Sangkaew
- Production company: Pop Pictures
- Distributed by: GTH (Thailand); Mosquito Films Distribution
- Release dates: 1 September 2013 (Venice); 28 November 2013 (Thailand)
- Running time: 127 minutes
- Country: Thailand
- Language: Thai

Mary Is Happy, Mary Is Happy is a 2013 Thai coming-of-age comedy drama film written and directed by Nawapol Thamrongrattanarit, starring Patcha Poonpiriya, Chonnikan Netjui and Wasupol Kriangprapakit. The film was based on 410 tweets by Twitter user @marylony, and revolves around Mary (Patcha Poonpiriya) and her friend Suri (Chonnikan Netjui) who are studying at a fictional high school. The film was one of three films which were developed, produced and funded by Venice Biennale in 2013 and it had its world premiere at the Venice Film Festival.

== Cast ==
- Patcha Poonpiriya as Mary
- Chonnikan Netjui as Suri Aksornsawang
- Wasupol Kriangprapakit as M

== Release ==
Mary Is Happy, Mary Is Happy had its world premiere at the 70th Venice International Film Festival on 1 September 2013. The film had its Asian premiere at the 18th Busan International Film Festival on 3 October 2013 and was screened at the Valdivia International Film Festival on 11 October 2013, the Tokyo International Film Festival on 19 October 2013, the Hong Kong Asian Film Festival starting 8 November 2013, and the Torino Film Festival starting 22 November 2013.

The film had a limited theatrical release in Thailand on 28 November 2013 in selected theatres in Bangkok.
