= A Gift (film) =

2016 Thai film

- Thai theatrical poster
- Original title: พรจากฟ้า
- Directed by: Jira Maligool; Nithiwat Tharathorn; Chayanop Boonprakob; Kriangkrai Vachiratamporn
- Written by: Kriangkrai Vachiratamporn; Jira Maligool; Chayanop Boonprakob; Nithiwat Tharatorn
- Produced by: Suwimon Techasupinan; Chenchonnee Soonthornsaratul; Vanridee Pongsittisak; Jira Maligool
- Starring: Chantavit Dhanasevi; Nuengthida Sophon; Sunny Suwanmethanont; Nittha Jirayungyurn; Naphat Siangsomboon; Violette Wautier
- Cinematography: Naruphol Chokanapitak
- Edited by: Panayu Kunvanlee; Chonlasit Upanigkit; Thammarat Sumetsupachok
- Music by: Hualumpong Riddim; Vichaya Vatanasapt; Thailand Philharmonic Orchestra
- Production company: Jor Kwang Films
- Distributed by: GDH 559; Singha Corporation
- Release date: 1 December 2016 (Thailand)
- Running time: 144 minutes
- Country: Thailand
- Language: Thai
- Box office: ฿42.88 million

A Gift, known in Thai as Pohn Jak Fah (Thai: พรจากฟ้า, RTGS: Phon Chak Fa, meaning "Blessings from the Sky"), is a 2016 Thai film released by GDH 559. An anthology in three segments, the film explores the theme of music as gifts and pays tribute to the late King Bhumibol Adulyadej's musical compositions.

Each of the film's segments is based on one of the King's compositions. The first segment, based on the song "Love at Sundown", is a romantic comedy directed by Chayanop Boonprakob and Kriangkrai Vachiratamporn. It stars Naphat Siangsomboon and Violette Wautier. The second, "Still on My Mind", is a family drama directed by Nithiwat Tharathorn, and stars Nittha Jirayungyurn and Sunny Suwanmethanont. The final segment, "New Year Greeting" is a comedy by Jira Maligool (who also co-produced the film), starring Chantavit Dhanasevi and Nuengthida Sophon.

The film was originally slated for release on 1 December 2016, to celebrate King Bhumibol's birthday on 5 December as well as the upcoming new year. However, the King died on 13 October, and the producers considered postponing the release. They ultimately decided to keep to the original release date, making some minor edits so that the film would serve as a tribute to the late king.

A Gift was positively received. Critics described it as "funny and sentimental without being cloying," and, noting the release's relation to the King's passing, that "we need to smile, and this film has plenty to offer." It earned a moderate 42.88 million baht at the Thai box office (US$1.2 million), and was the fourth-grossing Thai film of 2016. The film won two Suphannahong National Film Awards, for Best Original Score and Best Recording and Sound Mixing.

== Cast ==
- Chantavit Dhanasevi
- Nuengthida Sophon
- Sunny Suwanmethanont
- Nittha Jirayungyurn
- Naphat Siangsomboon
- Violette Wautier
