= Vichaya Vatanasapt =

Thai musician, composer and music producer

Vichaya Vatanasapt (Thai: วิชญ วัฒนศัพท์) is a Thai musician, composer and music producer, best known for film scores produced through his studio Hualampong Riddim.

Vichaya graduated in architecture from King Mongkut's Institute of Technology Ladkrabang, and only had informal training in music. Upon graduation, he joined the band La-Ong-Fong, and went on to pursue a career in music instead of architecture. After La-Ong-Fong, he worked with the band T-Bone, co-founding Hualampong Riddim in 1999 as an indie label to manage the band as well as his own electro-pop project The Photo Sticker Machine.

Soon, Hualampong Riddim began producing music for advertising, and then branched into film music, beginning with the 1999 indie film Kon Jorn. Vichaya went on to compose for Yuthlert Sippapak's 2003 film February, and co-wrote the score for Pen-ek Ratanaruang's Last Life in the Universe with Jettamon Malayota. He composed several other works for Yuthlert and Pen-ek, and has since produced numerous further output, including works done with film studio GTH/GDH, of which The Teacher's Diary (2014), Heart Attack (2015), A Gift (2016), and Bad Genius (2017) all won the Suphannahong National Film Award for best original score.

In 2020, Vichaya composed the original soundtrack for the Thai mini-series, I Told Sunset About You.
