= GDH 559 =

Thai film production company

- Type: Subsidiary
- Industry: Film production
- Predecessor: GTH
- Founded: 5 January 2016; 10 years ago
- Headquarters: Bangkok, Thailand
- Area served: Worldwide
- Key people: Jina Osothsilp (CEO); Jira Maligool
- Products: Motion pictures
- Parent: GMM Grammy
- Website: www.gdh559.co.th

GDH 559 Co., Ltd. (Thai: บริษัท จีดีเอช ห้าห้าเก้า จำกัด), doing business as GDH, is a film studio subsidiary of the Thai entertainment conglomerate GMM Grammy. It was founded on 5 January 2016, as a successor to GMM Tai Hub (GTH) — Thailand's most successful film studio of the prior 11 years — which had been dissolved in December 2015 due to internal conflicts between the company's three major shareholders — GMM Grammy, Tai Entertainment and Hub Ho Hin. GDH had released films of various genres such as romance, comedy, horror and drama as well as the hit films Bad Genius and How to Make Millions Before Grandma Dies.

== Background ==
GDH was formed as a joint venture between GMM Grammy and Hub Ho Hin Bangkok following the closure of GMM Tai Hub. The company was registered on December 14, 2015, with registered capital of 150,000,000 million baht under the same shareholding proportion. With the departure of GTH's former president Visute Poolvoralaks, GMM Grammy and Hub Ho Hin rejoined to create GDH 559, which inherited almost all of GTH's creative personnel and resources.

According to Jira Maligool, the company name is said to stand for Gross Domestic Happiness, which refers to the happiness of spectators and workers, and the numbers in the company name refer to the date and year of the company's foundation as well as its number of new shareholders of 59 people. During its tenure as GTH, GMM Grammy holds 51% of its share and Hub Ho Hin Bangkok holds 15%, and of Tai Entertainment by 30%. Despite the management changes, GDH retains its same Bangkok headquarters as Hub Ho Hin Film and GTH and has since expanded to more companies around its neighbourhood.

The company used the placeholder trade name GDH Five Five Nine until an official logo was issued. It then changed its current trade name to simply GDH.

== Corporate structure ==
GDH 559 is owned by GMM Grammy, which holds a majority 51-percent stake, and Hub Ho Hin, which owns 15 percent. The rest is held by individual shareholders, most of whom are the company's staff and crew. GDH operates the various aspects of its business through its subsidiaries and affiliates:

Jor Kwang Films Co., Ltd. is GDH's production company, although it is not a direct subsidiary; the company is owned by GDH's directors and producers.

GDH 559's subsidiary companies are:

- Nadao Bangkok Co., Ltd. (closed since June 2022 and rebranded as Tada Entertainment)

Nadao Bangkok covers artist management, production, and television series development.

- Sawasdee Thaweesuk Co., Ltd.

Promotion

- Ngandee Thaweesuk Co., Ltd.

Public relations and event management

- The Secret Farm Co., Ltd.

Online digital agency

- Siangdee Thaweesuk Co., Ltd.

Sound recording

- Good Things Happen Co., Ltd.

Sales

== Filmography ==
Alongside its current slate of films, GDH 559 also owns the distribution rights to all of the film libraries produced and distributed by its predecessor companies GTH, GMM Pictures, Tai Entertainment and Hub Ho Hin Bangkok.

As of 2021, the majority of the GDH/GTH film catalogue is now available on streaming in Thailand through Disney+ Hotstar.

In 2023, GDH established an international distribution unit called Out of the Box to distribute international films under the GDH label. Its first acquisition under the label is Past Lives.

=== Films ===
Year	Title	Director	Production company	Genre	Release date(s) (Thailand)
2016	One Day	Banjong Pisanthanakun	Jor Kwang Films	Romance, Drama	1 September 2016
2016	A Gift (Co-produced with Singha Corporation)	Jira Maligool; Nithiwat Tharathorn; Chayanop Boonprakob; Grienggrai Wachiratammapohn	Jor Kwang Films	Musical, Romance, Drama, Comedy	1 December 2016
2017	Bad Genius	Nattawut Poonpiriya	Jor Kwang Films	Heist Thriller	3 May 2017
2017	The Promise	Sophon Sakdapisit	Jor Kwang Films	Horror, Drama	7 September 2017
2018	Brother of the Year	Witthaya Thongyuyong	Jor Kwang Films	Romance, Comedy	9 May 2018
2018	BNK48: Girls Don't Cry	Nawapol Thamrongrattanarit	Very Sad Pictures; Salmon House; BNK48	Documentary	16 August 2018
2018	2,215	Nottapon Boonprakob	GDH	Documentary	6 September 2018
2018	Homestay	Parkpoom Wongpoom	Jor Kwang Films	Thriller, Fantasy	25 October 2018
2019	Friend Zone	Chayanop Boonprakob	Jor Kwang Films	Romance, Comedy	14 February 2019
2019	Tootsies and The Fake	Piyachart Thong-Uam	Jor Kwang Films	Comedy	5 December 2019
2019	Happy Old Year	Nawapol Thamrongrattanarit	Very Sad Pictures; Happy Ending Film	Romance, Drama	26 December 2019
2020	The ConHeartist	Mez Tharatorn	Jor Kwang Films	Comedy	3 December 2020
2021	Ghost Lab	Paween Purijitpanya	Jor Kwang Films; Netflix	Scientific Thriller	26 May 2021
2021	The Medium	Banjong Pisanthanakun	Jor Kwang Films; Showbox	Horror	14 July 2021 (South Korea); 12 August 2021 (Singapore); 28 October 2021 (Thailand)
2022	One for the Road	Nattawut Poonpiriya	Jet Tone Films, BLK2 Distribution	Comedy, Drama	10 February 2022
2022	Fast and Feel Love	Nawapol Thamrongrattanarit	Happy Ending Film; Very Sad Pictures	Action, Comedy	6 April 2022
2022	Love Destiny: The Movie	Adisorn Tresirikasem	Jor Kwang Films; Broadcast Thai Television	Romance, Comedy	28 July 2022 (Thailand & Laos); 30 July 2022 (Australia); 11 August 2022 (Singapore & Cambodia)
2022	OMG! Oh My Girl	Thitipong Kerdthongtawee	Hello Filmmaker iSM	Comedy, Drama, Romance	27 October 2022
2023	You & Me & Me	Wannwaew and Waewawan Hongwiwat	Jor Kwang Films	Drama, Romance	9 February 2023
2023	Home For Rent	Sophon Sakdapisit	Jor Kwang Films; N8 Studios	Horror, Thriller	6 April 2023
2023	Not Friends	Atta Hemwadee	Houseton Films	Drama, Romance, Comedy	26 October 2023
2024	How to Make Millions Before Grandma Dies	Pat Boonnitipat	Jor Kwang Films	Comedy, Drama, Family	4 April 2024
2024	The Paradise of Thorns	Naruebet Kuno	Jor Kwang Films; JAI Studios	Drama, Thriller	22 August 2024
2024	404 Run Run	Pichaya Jarasboonpracha	Raruek Production Co., LTD	Horror, Comedy	28 November 2024
2025	Flat Girls	Jirassaya Wongsutin	Jor Kwang Films	Life, Drama	6 February 2025
2025	The Red Envelope	Chayanop Boonprakob	Billkin Entertainment; PP Krit Entertainment	Supernatural, Comedy, Mystery	20 March 2025
2025	Diva, la Vie	Kittiphak Thongauam	ITTIPATA Universal Music Thaiand	Musical, Comedy	10 December 2025
2026	Human Resource	Nawapol Thamrongrattanarit	One Cool Connect; JAI Studios; Happy Ending Film	Drama	29 January 2026
2026	Gohan	Chayanop Boonprakob Nattawut Poonpiriya Atta Hemwadee	Houseton Films	Drama	2 April 2026
2026	Henry's First Dates	Mez Thanathorn	Sony Pictures Releasing International	Comedy, Drama	17 September 2026
2026	Inherit	Banjong Pisanthanakun	TOFU Films	Horror	19 November 2026

==== Out Of The Box ====
Year	Title	Director	Production company	Genre	Country	Release date (Thailand)
2023	Past Lives	Celine Song	A24; CJ ENM; Killer Films; 2AM	Romance, Drama	United States	6 July 2023
2024	Blue Giant	Yuzuru Tachikawa	Toho Animation; NUT Studio	Anime, Drama	Japan	25 January 2024
2024	Ferrari	Michael Mann	STX Entertainment; Ketchup Entertainment	Biographical, Sports Drama	United States	30 May 2024
2024	The Substance	Coralie Fargeat	Mubi; Working Title Films; A Good Story	Body horror	United States; United Kingdom; France	26 September 2024
2025	A Useful Ghost	Ratchapoom Boonbunchachoke	185 Films; Haut Les Mains; Momo Films; Mayana Films; N8; Cinema22	Black comedy, fantasy	Thailand; Singapore; France	28 August 2025
2025	Sorry, Baby	Eva Victor	Tango Entertainment; High Frequency Entertainment; Big Beach; Pastel	Comedy, Drama	United States	4 September 2025
2026	The Drama	Kristoffer Borgli	A24; Square Peg	Comedy, Drama	United States	23 April 2026

=== Television series ===
Year	Title	Director	Co-Production Company	Broadcast Date	Original Network
2016	Diary of Tootsies	Piyachart Thong-Uam; Pat Boonnitipat	Parbdee Thaweesuk	23 January – 16 April 2016	GMM 25
2016	Gasohug	Patha Thongpan	Parbdee Thaweesuk	6 February – 19 March 2016	LINE TV
2016	I See You	Prin Keeratiratanalak	Parbdee Thaweesuk	7 May – 30 July 2016	GMM 25
2017	Diary of Tootsies 2	Piyachart Thong-Uam	Jor Kwang Films; GMMTV	11 February – 29 April 2017	GMM 25
2017	Project S: Spike!	Pitchaya Jarusboonpracha	Nadao Bangkok; Hub Ho Hin	20 May – 8 July 2017	GMM 25
2017	Project S: Side by Side	Naruebet Kuno	Nadao Bangkok; Jor Kwang Films	15 July – 2 September 2017	GMM 25
2017	Project S: S.O.S	Pat Boonnitipat	Nadao Bangkok; Hub Ho Hin	9 September – 25 November 2017	GMM 25
2018	Project S: Shoot! I Love You	Tanida Hantaweewatana	Nadao Bangkok; Jor Kwang Films	2 December 2017 – 20 January 2018	GMM 25
2020	One Year	Jirassaya Wongsutin	Jor Kwang Films; Line Thailand	28 November 2019 – 6 February 2020	LINE TV
2020	Bad Genius	Pat Boonnitipat	Jor Kwang Films	3 August 2020 – 8 September 2020	One 31
2023	DELETE	Parkpoom Wongpoom	Jor Kwang Films	28 June 2023	Netflix
2025	Mad Unicorn	Nattapon Boonprakob		29 May 2025	Netflix
