= Hunger (2023 film) =

- Film poster
- Directed by: Sitisiri Mongkolsiri
- Written by: Kongdej Jaturanrasamee
- Produced by: Kongdej Jaturanrasamee; Soros Sukhum
- Starring: Chutimon Chuengcharoensukying; Nopachai Chaiyanam; Gunn Svasti
- Cinematography: T-Thawat Taifayongvichit
- Edited by: Manussa Vorasingha; Abhisit Wongwaitrakarn
- Music by: Chaibovon Seelookwar
- Production company: Song Sound Production
- Distributed by: Netflix
- Release date: April 6, 2023
- Running time: 145 minutes
- Country: Thailand
- Language: Thai

Hunger (Thai: คนหิว เกมกระหาย) is a 2023 Thai psychological drama film directed by Sitisiri Mongkolsiri and written by Kongdej Jaturanrasamee. It stars Chutimon Chuengcharoensukying as Aoy, a street-food cook who is invited to join the fine-dining industry under the tutelage of the infamous Chef Paul, played by Nopachai Jayanama, with Gunn Svasti as Tone, a supportive sous chef. The film was announced by Netflix in 2022 as one of its six upcoming Thai original productions, and was released on the platform in April 2023. The film received mostly positive reviews.

== Plot ==
Aoy is the main cook at her family's street restaurant. She is scouted by Tone, the junior sous-chef of Hunger, a haute cuisine catering restaurant run by the celebrity Chef Paul. Dissatisfied with the direction of her life since finishing high school, Aoy accepts the invitation and auditions alongside a culinary school graduate. Paul has the applicants cook fried rice, and hires Aoy for her deeper understanding of culinary technique and her skill with the wok.

In preparation for a private birthday party hosted by a retired general, Paul demands that Aoy slice and fry wagyu beef to exacting specifications. After many failed attempts, she walks out in frustration but returns and practices frying the meat all night until Paul finally approves. At the party, Aoy fries the meat in front of the guests, who include entrepreneur Tos, a business rival of Paul. As Aoy continues working with the relentless Paul, she faces the limits of her skills and studies more cooking techniques from Tone.

Hunger's soup specialist Tue is fired for stealing ingredients, forcing sous-chef Dang to pick up the slack for Hunger's next client, a family of three. When Paul tries the soup, he tosses it out and remakes it using cheap ingredients on hand, later explaining that he tasted shrimp in the original soup even though he warned his chefs that the client's young daughter had a shellfish allergy. Paul deduces Dang sabotaged the soup due to his jealousy over Hunger's younger chefs surpassing him. Dang stabs Paul with a knife and storms out. Aoy visits the hospitalized Paul, who opens up about the reason he became a chef. His mother was a maid for an extravagantly rich family, and she was forced to make restitution when he broke a jar of caviar. The incident made Paul realize that the rich view food as a status symbol and take flavor and nourishment for granted, and he resolved to become a chef of such renown that rich people would debase themselves to have him cook for them. Aoy is distraught by her father suffering a health crisis, as well as learning that Hunger's previous client was a construction executive heavily in debt who killed his wife, daughter, and himself after they ate their meal.

After Paul leads Hunger to serve a government official in an illegal hunt and cooking of a protected great hornbill from a national park, Aoy and Tone quit. Aoy is hired as the head chef at Tos's new restaurant Flame and grows famous, while Tone's restaurant struggles. A celebrity named Milky hires both Aoy and Paul to cook for her birthday party, which turns into an impromptu competition as the two chefs vie for the guests' adulation. In the end, Paul "wins" by serving an ordinary soup, and he explains to Aoy that he won not because his food or presentation were superior to hers, but because his reputation made the guests desire anything served by him more. However, Paul's gloating is interrupted when Tone leaks a video of Paul cooking the hornbill and the chef is arrested. Tos admits that he and Tone conspired to use the party to destroy Paul and elevate Aoy; furthermore, the celebrity client picked Paul for her party first and only hired Aoy because of Tos's lobbying. Disillusioned, Aoy quits Flame. She is welcomed home by her family and resumes cooking at their restaurant.

== Cast ==
- Nopachai Jayanama as Chef Paul
  - Chimwemwe Miller as Paul (voice)
- Chutimon Chuengcharoensukying as Aoy
- Gunn Svasti Na Ayudhya as Tone
  - Alex Gravenstein as Tone (voice)
- Majid Sajadi as Food Taster
- Bhumibhat Thavornsiri as Au
- Kenneth Won as Party Guest
- Varit Leesavan as Tos
- Lalita Paisarn as Milky
- Sunya Thadathanawong as Chai

== Reception ==
The film received mostly positive reviews, with an 86% rating on review aggregator Rotten Tomatoes. The Bangkok Post's reviewer Tatat Bunnag criticized the screenplay and dialogue, but concluded that "despite all the flaws, Hunger is still worth watching, especially for those who love intense drama and exotic settings."
