= Nattawut Poonpiriya =

Thai director

- นัฐวุฒิ พูนพิริยะ
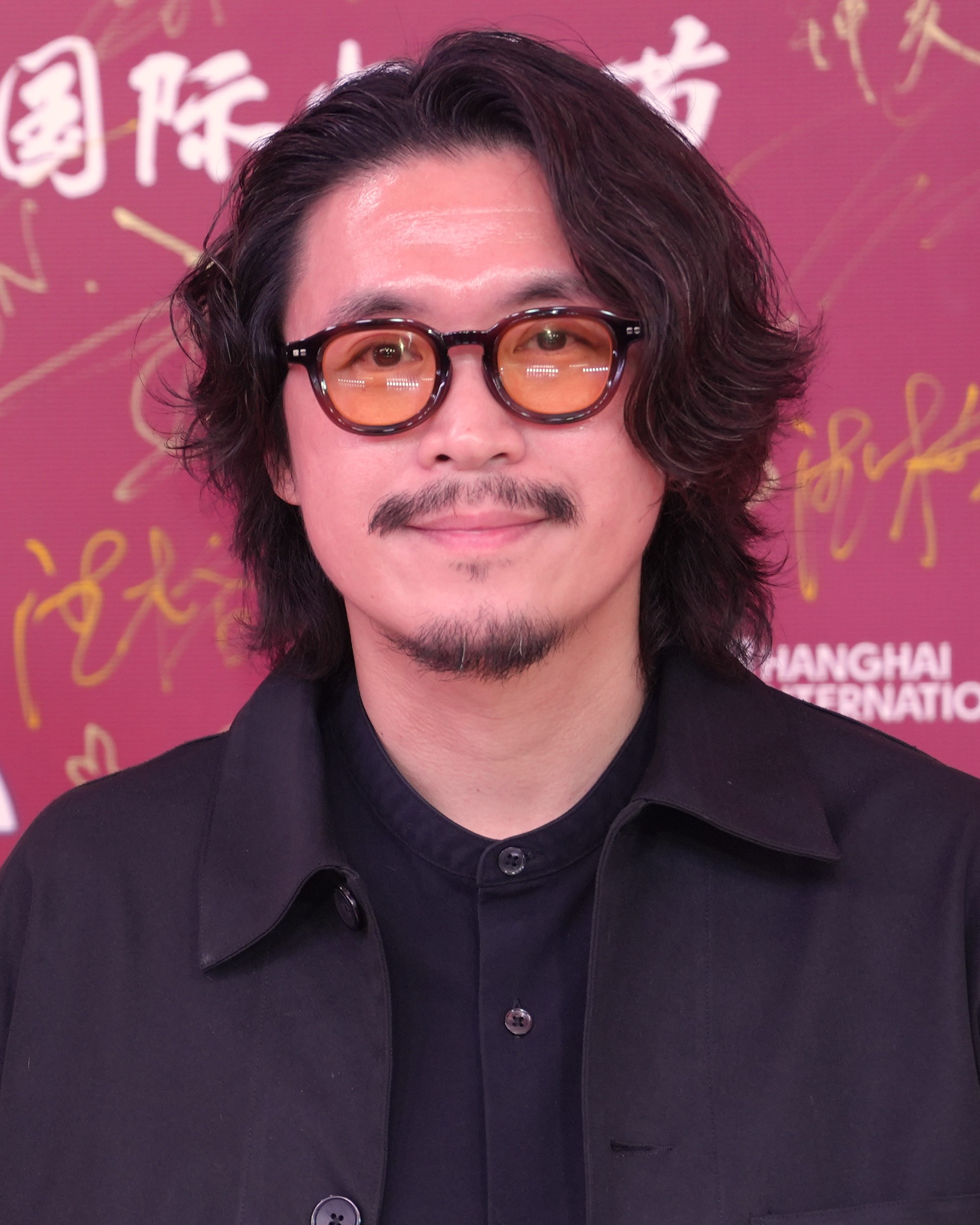
- Poonpiriya at 2026 Shanghai International Film Festival
- Born: 1981 (age 44–45); Bangkok, Thailand
- Other name: Baz
- Education: Pratt Institute; Srinakharinwirot University
- Occupation: Film director
- Years active: 2012–present
- Notable work: Countdown (2012); Bad Genius (2017); One for the Road (2021)

Nattawut "Baz" Poonpiriya (Thai: นัฐวุฒิ พูนพิริยะ, born 1981) is a Thai director, working extensively on television commercials and music videos, but best known for the films Countdown, Bad Genius and One for the Road.

== Biography ==
Nattawut graduated with a Master of Fine Arts in stage directing from Srinakharinwirot University. After graduating, he worked mainly on television commercials for three years before moving to New York to study graphic design at Pratt Institute. He returned to Thailand in 2011, and worked as a music video director before directing his first feature film, the horror thriller Countdown, for GTH in 2012. The film won three categories at the Suphannahong National Film Awards. Nattawut then took a hiatus from feature films to focus again on advertising. His second feature, Bad Genius, was released in 2017, and won a record-breaking twelve categories at the awards.

== Filmography ==
=== Feature films ===
- Countdown (2012)
- Bad Genius (2017)
- One for the Road (2022)
- Gohan (2026)

=== Short films ===
- The Library (2013)
- Present Perfect (2014)
- i Stories 'L' (2018), co-directed with Khamkwan Duangmanee

== Awards and honors ==
- 22nd Suphannahong National Film Award for Best Screenplay (for Countdown, 2012)
- 27th Suphannahong National Film Award for Best Director (for Bad Genius, 2017)
- 27th Suphannahong National Film Award for Best Screenplay (with Tanida Hantaweewatana and Vasudhorn Piyaromna, for Bad Genius, 2017)
- 26th Bangkok Critics Assembly Award for Best Director (for Bad Genius, 2017)
- 26th Bangkok Critics Assembly Award for Best Screenplay (with Tanida Hantaweewatana and Vasudhorn Piyaromna, for Bad Genius, 2017)
