= Bangkok Critics Assembly Awards =

The Bangkok Critics Assembly Awards (Thai: รางวัลภาพยนตร์ไทย ชมรมวิจารณ์บันเทิง; lit. "Entertainment Critics Club Awards") is a film award based in Thailand. It is given by the Bangkok Critics Assembly (Thai: ชมรมวิจารณ์บันเทิง, RTGS: Chomrom Wichan Banthoeng), an association of professional film critics, to local feature film productions on an annual basis. The first ceremony was held in 1991 for films released in 1990, with awards in eleven categories. Two more categories and a lifetime achievement award have since been added. The awards are decided by a regular panel of judges, and is considered one of the most prestigious in the Thai cinema industry. The ceremony is usually low-key and informal, and is often compared and contrasted to the red-carpet Suphannahong National Film Awards.

== Ceremonies ==
Ceremony	Date	Venue	Reference
1st Bangkok Critics Assembly Awards	1990	-	-
2nd Bangkok Critics Assembly Awards	1991	-	-
3rd Bangkok Critics Assembly Awards	1993	-	-
4th Bangkok Critics Assembly Awards	1994	-	-
5th Bangkok Critics Assembly Awards	1995	-	-
6th Bangkok Critics Assembly Awards	1998	-	-
7th Bangkok Critics Assembly Awards	1999	-	-
8th Bangkok Critics Assembly Awards	2000	-	-
9th Bangkok Critics Assembly Awards	2001	-	-
10th Bangkok Critics Assembly Awards	2002	-	-
11th Bangkok Critics Assembly Awards	2003	-	-
12th Bangkok Critics Assembly Awards	2004	-	-
13th Bangkok Critics Assembly Awards	2005	-	-
14th Bangkok Critics Assembly Awards	2006	-	-
15th Bangkok Critics Assembly Awards	2007	-	-
16th Bangkok Critics Assembly Awards	2008	-	-
17th Bangkok Critics Assembly Awards	2009	-	-
18th Bangkok Critics Assembly Awards	2010	-	-
19th Bangkok Critics Assembly Awards	2011	-	-
20th Bangkok Critics Assembly Awards	2012	-	-
21st Bangkok Critics Assembly Awards	2013	-	-
22nd Bangkok Critics Assembly Awards	2014	-	-
23rd Bangkok Critics Assembly Awards	2015	-	-
24th Bangkok Critics Assembly Awards	2016	-	-
25th Bangkok Critics Assembly Awards	2017	-	-
26th Bangkok Critics Assembly Awards	2018	-	-
27th Bangkok Critics Assembly Awards	2019	-	-
28th Bangkok Critics Assembly Awards	21 July 2020	Makkhawan Rangsan Room, Royal Thai Army Club, Bangkok	
29th Bangkok Critics Assembly Awards	18 December 2021	-	-
30th Bangkok Critics Assembly Awards	27 July 2022	Makkhawan Rangsan Room, Royal Thai Army Club, Bangkok	
31st Bangkok Critics Assembly Awards	2023	Makkhawan Rangsan Room, Royal Thai Army Club, Bangkok	
32nd Bangkok Critics Assembly Awards	18 July 2024	Thailand Cultural Center	
33rd Bangkok Critics Assembly Awards	17 September 2025	Grand Chambray Balloon, Avani Sukhumvit Hotel, Bangkok	
