= Nawapol Thamrongrattanarit =

Thai filmmaker (born 1984)

- นวพล ธำรงรัตนฤทธิ์
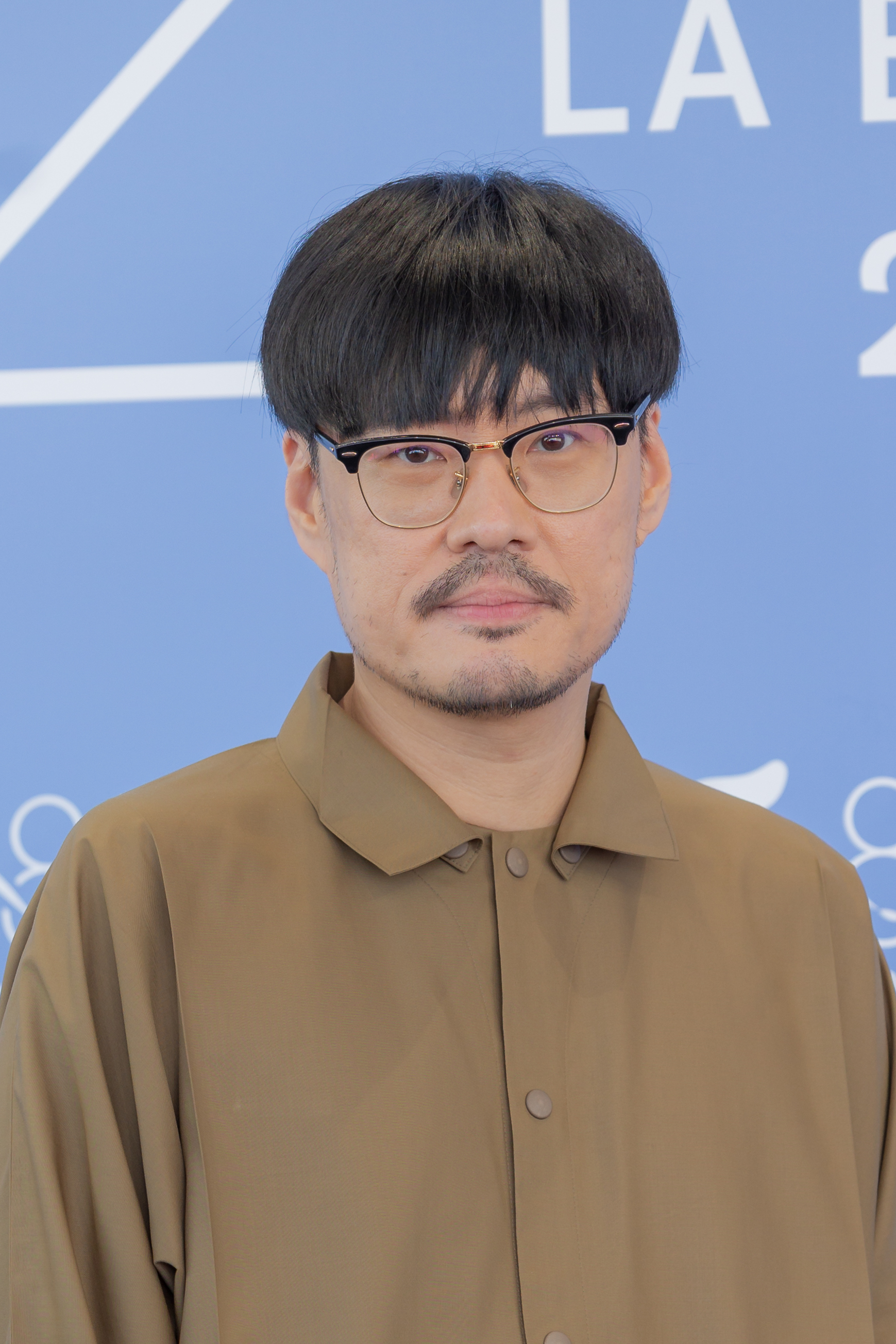
- Nawapol in 2025
- Born: 4 February 1984 (age 42); Bangkok, Thailand
- Occupations: Film director; screenwriter; film editor
- Years active: 2010–present
- Website: Official website

Nawapol Thamrongrattanarit (Thai: นวพล ธำรงรัตนฤทธิ์, RTGS: Nawaphon Thamrongrattanarit; born 4 February 1984) is a Thai writer, screenwriter and film director.

Most known for Mary Is Happy, Mary Is Happy and Heart Attack, which won several awards in the Suphannahong National Film Awards.

== Filmography ==
=== Feature films ===
- 36 (2012)
- Mary Is Happy, Mary Is Happy (2013)
- The Master (2014)
- Heart Attack (2015)
- Die Tomorrow (2017)
- BNK48: Girls Don't Cry (2018)
- Happy Old Year (2019)
- Fast and Feel Love (2022)
- Human Resource (2025)

=== Short films ===
- The Temptation (2009)
- Mr. Mee Wanna Go to Egypt (2009)
- Francais (2009)
- Cherie is Korean-Thai (2010)
- Panatipata (2010)
- I Believe That Over 1 Million People Hate Maythawee (2011)
- SORRY (2012)
- 20 Scenes of June (2012)
- Patcha is Sexy (2014)
- Exotic (2014)
- Scene 37 (2014)
- Scene 38 (2015)
- Scene 39 (2016)
- Scene 40 (2017)
- Friendshit (2017)
- FACE/OFF (2018)

=== Music videos ===
- Slur - "Noob" (2010)
- Muanpair Panaboot - "Chan Pid Tee Kid Wa Rao Rak Gun" (2012)
- Greasy Cafe - "Moon" (2013)
- Stamp - "Keyboard Hustle" (2014)
- Yellow Fang - "Selfish" (2014)
- Watcharapong Tantek - "The Letter" (2016)

=== Screenplay ===
- Bangkok Traffic Love Story (2009)
- The Billionaire (2011)
- Seven Something segment "14" (2012)
- Home segment "The Wedding" (2012)
