= Apiwat Ueathavornsuk =

Thai singer (born 1982)

- อภิวัชร์ เอื้อถาวรสุข
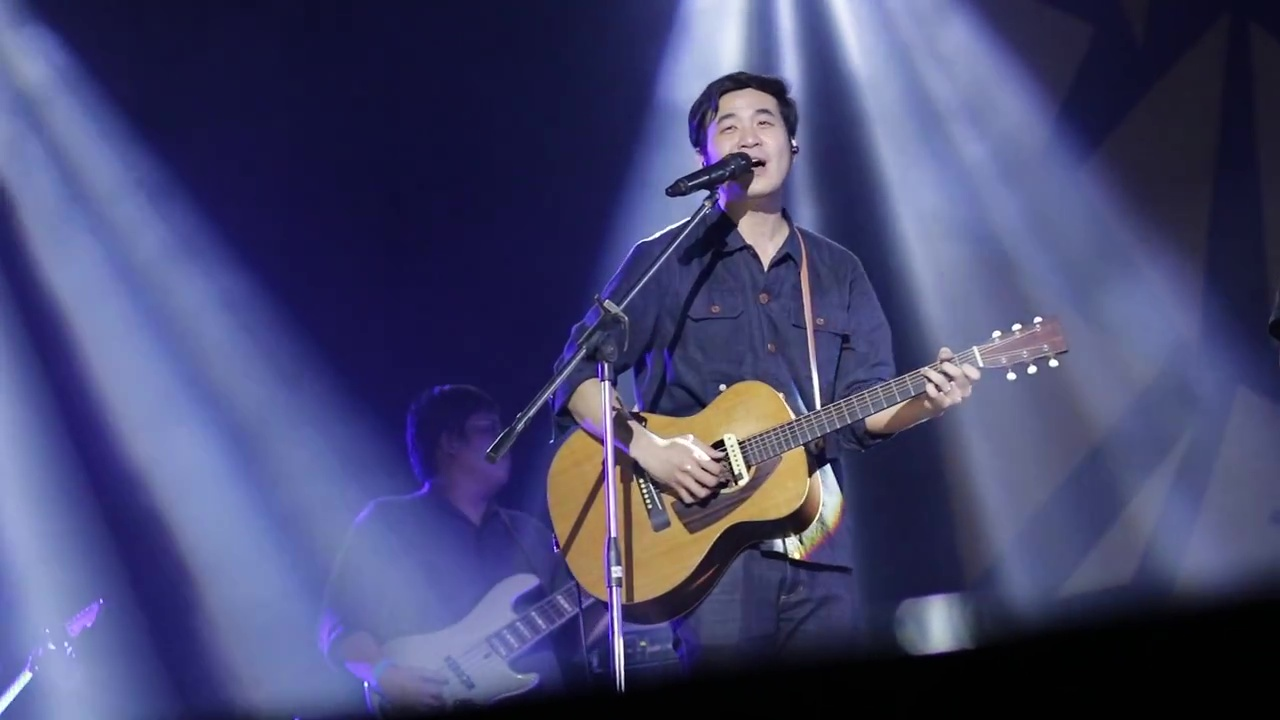
- Apiwat at the BBA Charity Concert, 2016
- Born: May 13, 1982 (age 44); Bangkok, Thailand
- Other name: Stamp Apiwat
- Education: Chulalongkorn University
- Occupations: Singer; Musical theatre actor
- Years active: 2002–present
- Agent: 123 Records (2018–present)
- Spouse: m. Jirisuda Sriwat (2015–present)

Apiwat Ueathavornsuk (previously spelled Eurthavornsuk, Thai: อภิวัชร์ เอื้อถาวรสุข, born 1982), nicknamed Stamp, is a Thai singer-songwriter and musical theatre actor.

== Biography ==
Apiwat Ueathavornsuk was born in 1982. He began playing guitar at the age of 15, inspired by his idols the alternative rock band Moderndog. He studied architecture at Chulalongkorn University, where he formed a band with his classmates in 2004, called 7thScene. 7thScene released only one album under the label Love Is, but Apiwat continued to work extensively with leading songwriter Boyd Kosiyabong, composing and writing for musicians as well as various media. He then branched out into singing, releasing his first solo EP Million Ways to Write Part I in 2008 and gradually building a large following—his first large-scale concert Stamp Krian Day in March 2013 saw fans queueing up before dawn and tickets selling out within the day. Apiwat became one of the four coaches on the singing talent show The Voice Thailand, which launched in 2012, and released his first full-length album, Sci-Fi, in 2014.

So far, he has collaborated with many well-known artists in oversea such as Crowd lu (Taiwan) on stage, DEPAPEPE (Japan), YMCK (Japan), and POPETC (U.S.). Recently, he just released his international album STAMPSTH (all English song) which produced by an American singer/songwriter Christopher Chu from POPETC in Japan in 2017.
