= Nittha Jirayungyurn =

Thai actress and model (born 1990)

Nittha Khuhapremkit
- นิษฐา คูหาเปรมกิจ
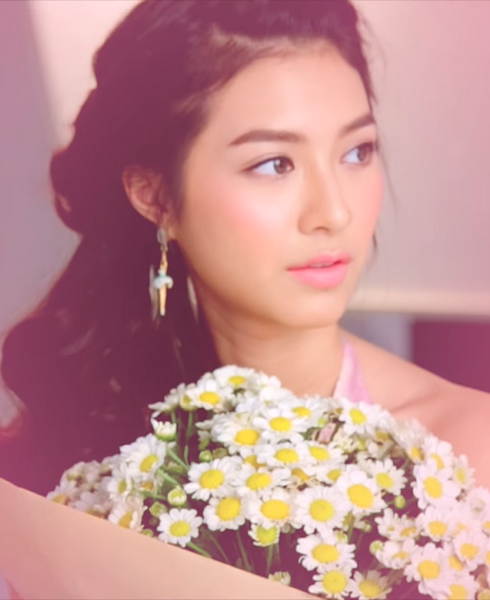
- Nittha in 2015
- Born: Nittha Jirayungyurn; September 21, 1990 (age 36); Bangkok, Thailand
- Other name: Mew Nittha
- Education: Srinakharinwirot University; (Faculty of Fine Arts)
- Occupations: Actress; model; YouTuber
- Years active: 2013–present
- Agent: Channel 3 Thailand
- Spouse: Tharaphut Khuhapremkit (m. 2020)
- Children: 2

Nittha Khuhapremkit (Thai: นิษฐา คูหาเปรมกิจ; born 21 September 1990), formerly Nittha Jirayungyurn (Thai: นิษฐา จิรยั่งยืน, RTGS: Nittha Chirayangyuen), nicknamed Mew (Thai: มิว) is a Thai actress and model who is under Channel 3 Thailand. Her first drama is Khun Chai Pawornruj as Thanying Wanrasa and she was paired with Prin Suparat for the popular drama My Husband in Law. Until now, she has acted in several dramas for Channel 3 Thailand.

== Early life and education ==
She was born on 21 September 1990 in Bangkok, Thailand. She went to Sacred Heart School during her primary school days and went to St Joseph Convent School on her high school days. She graduated from Srinakharinwirot University with major in Fashion Design. In 2016, she starred in her first movie, One Day paired with Chantavit Dhanasevi.

== Personal life ==
=== Marriage and family ===
She married Tharaphut Kuhapremkit, a businessman and heir to a gold-trading family, at the end of December 2019, and the wedding ceremony took place in early January 2020.

On September 12, 2021, she gave birth to a baby girl named Marin Kuhapremkit.

== Filmography ==
=== Film ===
Year	Title	Role	Note
2016	One Day	Nui	Lead role
2016	A Gift	Fa	Main cast
2018	7 Days	Mean	Lead role
2023	Home for Rent	Ning	Lead role
2026	The red Line	Ornaree Ekmongkol	Lead role

=== Television series ===
Year	English title	Native title	Role	Network	Notes
2013	Suphapburut Juthathep; Khun Chai Pawornruj	สุภาพบุรุษจุฑาเทพ คุณชายปวรรุจ	M.C. Wanrasa Arunrat (Taew) / Tan Ying Rasa / Rasa (disguise)	Channel 3	Main role
2013	Khun Chai Puttipat	คุณชายพุฒิภัทร	Wanrasa Juthathep Na Ayutthaya	Channel 3	Cameo
2013	Khun Chai Ronapee	คุณชายรณพีร์	Wanrasa Juthathep Na Ayutthaya	Channel 3	Cameo
2014	Ruk Ok Rit	รักออกฤทธิ์	Wanisa Sookjitjai / Wanisa Jitsaard / Wani / Wawa	Channel 3	Main role
2014	Sai See Plerng	ทรายสีเพลิง	Savanee Phrommasnarai (Looksorn)	Channel 3	Main role
2015	Mafia Luerd Mungkorn: Singh	เลือดมังกร ตอน สิงห์	Jirusaya / Ah Ju	Channel 3	Main role
2015–2016	Tarm Ruk Keun Jai	ตามรักคืนใจ	Naara Wanpanit / Noona Thongkanka	Channel 3	Main role
2016	Chat Phayak	ชาติพยัคฆ์	Ploy	Channel 3	Main role
2017	Petch Klang Fai	เพชรกลางไฟ	Mom Chao Ying Urawasee (Princess Urawasee)	Channel 3	Main role
2017	Buang Hong	บ่วงหงส์	Naara Wanpanit	Channel 3	Cameo
2017	Rak Nakara	รากนครา	Mingla	Channel 3	Main role
2017	Por Yung Lung Mai Wahng	พ่อยุ่งลุงไม่ว่าง	Chiddao	Channel 3	Main role
2018	Duay Raeng Atitharn	ด้วยแรงอธิษฐาน	Nattamon Silpapibun (Nat) (present) / Worada Asawakraisorn (Rada) (past)	Channel 3	Main role
2020	My Husband in Law	อกเกือบหักแอบรักคุณสามี	Nateerin Sawatirat / Nateerin Navanawakul / Muey	Channel 3	Main role
2021	Duang Ta Tee Sam	ดวงตาที่สาม	Palisa (Poom) / Sa / Namneung (spirit)	Channel 3	Main role

=== Music video appearances ===
Year	Song title	Singer
2012	"Kon Kun Welah (Wasting Time)"	Black Vanilla
2012	"Kit Tueng Kon Tee Mai Koey Jur (Miss The Person Who Never Meet)"	Yuthana Puengklarng
2013	"Lohk Bai Mai Mai Mee Tur (A New World Without You)"	Patcha Anek-Ayuwat
2014	"Faen (Girlfriend)"	Lipta
2014	"Yoo Dtrong Nee Nahn Gwah Nee (Right Here a Little Longer)"	Getsunova
2016	"Happy Birthday Channel 3"	with Tanawat Watanaputi
2016	"Set Laeo Dop (Set and Hit)"	with Urassaya Sperbund, Kimberly Ann Voltemas, Rasri Balenciaga, Ranee Campen and Ranida Techasit
2017	"Time Bomb"	Greasy Cafe, with Prin Suparat
2020	"Hua Jai Sung Hai Rak"	Praew Kanitkul, with Prin Suparat

=== Advertising ===
Year	Thai title	Title	Notes	With
2013	ผลิตภัณฑ์บำรุงผิว Cute Press UV Expert SPF 70			
2016	ผลิตภัณฑ์บำรุงผิวและเครื่องสำอาง Cute Press			
2017	AIS Next G	AIS Next G		
2017	ผลิตภัณฑ์ดูแลผิวหน้า Snail White	Snail White		Thongchai Thongkamtom
2017	11street (411estore Thailand)			Song Joong-ki
2017	ผลิตภัณฑ์ดูแลผิวหน้า ฮาดะ ลาโบะ	Hada Labo Hydrating Lotion		
2017	ธนาคารยูโอบี	United Overseas Bank		
2017	มือถือสัมผัสหัวเว่ย	Huawei		
2017	แบรนด์วีต้า ฟรุน	Brand's Veta Prune		
2017	นมกระป๋องตราหมีโกลด์	Panda Brand Gold		
2017	น้ำยาปรับผ้านุ่มไฮยีน	Hygiene		
2017	นาฬิกาข้อมือ ALBA	Alba		
2017	แซนด์วิชคุกกี้ Oreo	sandwich cookie Oreo		Tom Room39
2017	ผลิตภัณฑ์เปลี่ยนสีผม Liese	Liese Bubble Color		
2020	ยาสีฟัน คอลเกต ปัญจเวท สมุนไพร ดีท็อกซ์	Colgate Herbal Detox x2		
2021	สบู่เหลว PAROT			

=== Concert ===
- 2017 : LOVE IS IN THE AIR : CHANNEL3 CHARITY CONCERT, with all Channel 3 actors.

== Awards and nominations ==
Year	Award	Category	Nominated work	Result	Ref.
2013	6th Siam Dara Stars Awards	Best New Actress	Khun Chai Pawornruj	Won	
2013	8th OK! Awards	Female Rising Star	Khun Chai Pawornruj	Won	
2013	Seesan Bunturng Awards	Rising Actress	Khun Chai Pawornruj	Won	
2014	TV3 Fanclub Awards	Female Rising Actress	Khun Chai Pawornruj	Won	
2014	G-member Awards	Best Couple (with Tanawat Wattanaputi)	Khun Chai Pawornruj	Nominated	
2014	8th Kazz Awards	Best Couple (with Tanawat Wattanaputi)	Khun Chai Pawornruj	Nominated	
2014	3rd Daradaily the Great Awards	Female Rising Star	Khun Chai Pawornruj	Nominated	
2014	1st EFM Awards	Most Popular Actor – June	Ruk Ok Rit	Nominated	
2014	12th Seventeen Choice Awards	Seventeen Choice Rising Star, Actress	Khun Chai Pawornruj	Won	
2014	9th OK! Awards	Female Hot Stuff	—N/a	Won	
2015	5th Mthai Top Talk Awards	Top Talk-About Actress	Ruk Ok Rit, Sai See Plerng	Nominated	
2015	G-member Awards	Top Contributor of the Year	Sai See Plerng	Won	
2015	1st TrueLife Awards	Best Female Lead	Ruk Ok Rit	Nominated	
2015	8th Siam Dara Stars Awards	Best Supporting Actress (TV)	Sai See Plerng	Won	
2015	6th Nataraj Awards	Best Supporting Actress	Sai See Plerng	Nominated	
2015	10th OK! Awards	Female Hot Stuff	—N/a	Nominated	
2015	Seesan Bunturng Awards	Best Couple (with Nadech Kugimiya)	Tarm Ruk Keun Jai	Won	
2016	4th Mekkala Star Awards	Star Vote Good of the Year	—N/a	Nominated	
2016	1st Dara Inside Awards	Best Couple (with Tanawat Wattanaputi)	—N/a	Nominated	
2016	2nd Maya Awards	Best Actress (TV)	Tarm Ruk Keun Jai	Nominated	
2016	2nd Maya Awards	Best Couple (with Tanawat Wattanaputi)	—N/a	Nominated	
2016	9th Siam Dara Stars Awards	Best Actress (TV)	Tarm Ruk Keun Jai	Nominated	
2016	9th Siam Dara Stars Awards	Popular Female Star	Tarm Ruk Keun Jai	Nominated	
2017	6th Daradaily the Great Awards	Best Actress (Film)	One Day	Won	
2017	26th Thailand National Film Association Awards	Best Actress	One Day	Won	
2017	11th OK! Awards	Female Hot Stuff	—N/a	Nominated	
2017	14th Starpics Thai Films Awards	Best Actress	One Day	Won	
2017	25th Bangkok Critics Assembly Awards	Best Actress	One Day	Nominated	
2017	7th Thai Film Director Awards	Best Actress	One Day	Runner-up	
2017	11th Kazz Awards	Top Actress Award	One Day	Nominated	
2017	11th Kazz Awards	Rising Actress Award	—N/a	Nominated	
2017	Srinakharinwirot University	Outstanding Alumni Award	—N/a	Won	
2017	10th Nine Entertain Awards	Best Actress	One Day	Nominated	
2017	3rd Maya Awards	Best Actress (TV)	Petch Klang Fai	Nominated	
2017	3rd Maya Awards	Best Couple (with Tanawat Wattanaputi)	—N/a	Nominated	
2017	3rd Maya Awards	Charming Girl	—N/a	Nominated	
2017	2nd Dara Inside Awards	Best Couple (with Tanawat Wattanaputi)	—N/a	Nominated	
2017	AEC Awards	Best Executive	—N/a	Won	
2018	8th Mthai Top Talk Awards	Top Talk-About Actress	Rak Nakara	Nominated	
2018	32nd TV Gold Awards	Best Supporting Actress	Rak Nakara	Nominated	
2018	12th Kazz Awards	Rising Actress Award	—N/a	Nominated	
2018	7th Daradaily the Great Awards	Hot Girl of the Year	—N/a	Nominated	
2018	10th Siam Dara Star Awards	Best Supporting Actor (TV)	Rak Nakara	Nominated	
2018	9th Nataraj Awards	Best Supporting Actress	Rak Nakara	Won	
2018	4th Maya Awards	Charming Girl	—N/a	Nominated	
2018	4th Maya Awards	Best Couple (with Tanawat Wattanaputi)	Por Yung Lung Mai Wahng	Nominated	
2018	6th Thailand Headlines Person of the Year Awards	Culture and Entertainment – Actress	—N/a	Won	
2018	12th OK! Awards	Female Hot Stuff	—N/a	Won	
2019	27th Bangkok Critics Assembly Awards	Best Actress	7 Days	Nominated	
2019	8th Daradaily the Great Awards	Best Actress (Film)	7 Days	Nominated	
2019	2nd Asian Academy Creative Awards	Best Actress in a Leading Role	7 Days	Nominated	
2019	OK! Beauty Choice	Charming Babe	—N/a	Won	
2020	1st Content Asia Awards	Best Actress in a Leading Role	My Husband in Law	Nominated	
2020	17th Kom Chad Luek Awards	Best Leading Actress	My Husband in Law	Nominated	
2020	Vogue Beauty Readers' Choice Awards	Queen Bee of 2020	—N/a	Pending	
2021	Siam Series Awards 2021	Best Actress in a Leading Role	My Husband in Law	Nominated	
2021	35th TV Gold Awards	Best Leading Actress	My Husband in Law	Nominated	
2022	Maya Entertain Awards 2022	Best Leading Actress of The Year	Duang Tah Tee Sarm	Nominated	
2024	32nd Thailand National Film Association Awards	Best Actress	Home For Rent	Nominated	
