= Who Is She =

2024 South Korean television series

- Promotional poster
- Hangul: 수상한 그녀
- Lit.: A Suspicious Girl
- RR: Susanghan geunyeo
- MR: Susanghan kŭnyŏ
- Genre: Romantic fantasy; Musical; Coming-of-age
- Written by: Heo Seung-min
- Directed by: Park Yong-soon
- Starring: Kim Hae-sook; Jung Ji-so; Jung Jin-young; Chae Won-bin
- Music by: Park Se-joon
- Country of origin: South Korea
- Original language: Korean
- No. of episodes: 12

Production
- Production companies: Studio V Plus; Idea Factory; Higround; Yein Plus

Original release
- Network: KBS2
- Release: December 18, 2024 – January 23, 2025

Related
- Miss Granny (South Korean film); 20 Once Again (Chinese film); Sweet 20 (Vietnamese film); Sing My Life (Japanese film); Suddenly Twenty (Thai film); Sweet 20 (Indonesian film); 20 Once Again (Chinese TV series); Miss Granny (Philippine film); Oh! Baby (Indian film); Cuando sea joven (Mexican film)

Who Is She (Korean: 수상한 그녀) is a 2024–2025 South Korean television series starring Kim Hae-sook, Jung Ji-so, Jung Jin-young, and Chae Won-bin. The series is a remake of the 2014 film Miss Granny by Hwang Dong-hyuk, it depicts the story of Oh Mal-soon, a 70-year-old grandmother who suddenly turns into 20-year-old Oh Doo-ri. It aired on KBS2 from December 18, 2024, to January 23, 2025, every Wednesday and Thursday at 21:50 (KST).

== Synopsis ==
Who Is She is about 70-year-old grandmother Oh Mal-soon, who suddenly transforms into the 20 year old version of herself and lives under the name of Oh Doo-ri.

== Cast ==
=== Main ===
- Kim Hae-sook as Oh Mal-soon
- Jung Ji-so as Oh Doo-ri/Emily
- Jung Jin-young as Daniel Han (Han Joon-hyuk)
- Chae Won-bin as Choi Ha-na

=== Supporting ===
- In Gyo-jin as Choi Min-seok
- Seo Young-hee as Ban Ji-sook
- Jeong Bo-seok as Park Gap-yong
- Cha Hwa-yeon as Kim Ae-sim
- Hyun Jae-yeon as Sujin
- Kim So-won as Seo Chan-mi
- Oh Ji-yeon as Kwon Jun-hee
- Lee Dal as Jeong Ho-yi
- Jung Ji-yoon as Kang Yeong-eun
- Lee Hwa-kyum as Lina

A performance director and marketing team leader at Eunice Entertainment. A smart and witty 'all-rounder' who is the only trusted partner of producer Daniel Han and is good at everything.

- Lee Ji-hyeon as Mina

The only street-cast member of Element who comes from a wealthy family.

- Yue as Olra

The oldest and only foreign member of the group. She is fluent in Korean after three years of training. Considering Emily to be her closest friend as she was the only person with whom she could speak English, she harbours mixed feelings about Doo-ri, who appears after Emily disappears.

- Seowon as Jei

The youngest member of the group who was cast through a teen hip-hop competition.

- Yoo Jung-hoo as Park Jun

Younger version of Gap-yong.

== Production ==
=== Development ===
Developed under the working title Miss Granny, the series is directed by Park Yong-soon, who directed the dramas Secret Mother (2018), Wanted (2016) and Divorce Lawyer in Love (2015), and written by Heo Seung-min, who wrote Risky Romance (2018) and There Is a Blue Bird (2014). It is produced by Studio V Plus, Idea Factory, Higround, and Yein Plus. It is the tenth remake of the 2014 film Miss Granny by Hwang Dong-hyuk.

=== Casting ===
On March 3, 2023, Jung Ji-so had been cast as the female lead in the series. On September 15, BB Entertainment told Newsen that they were positively reviewing regarding Jung Jin-young's appearance. According to Seoul Economic Daily Star on September 20, Kim Hae-sook had been confirmed to appear.

On July 9, 2024, the production team of the series announced that Jung, who starred in the original film as young rocker Ban Ji-ha, confirmed his appearance but would play in another role.

=== Filming ===
Principal photography began in August 2023, and concluded in first half of 2024.

== Release ==
Who Is She is scheduled to premiere on KBS2 on December 18, 2024, and will air every Wednesday and Thursday at 21:50 (KST).

== Viewership ==
Who Is She : South Korea viewers per episode (thousands)

Season	Episode number											
Season	1	2	3	4	5	6	7	8	9	10	11	12
1	624	565	638	575	N/A	690	N/A	N/A	525	588	554	582

Source: Audience measurement performed nationwide by Nielsen Korea.

Average TV viewership ratings
Ep.	Original broadcast date	Average audience share (Nielsen Korea)	
Ep.	Original broadcast date	Nationwide	Seoul
1	December 18, 2024	3.9% (14th)	3.6% (15th)
2	December 18, 2024	3.4% (17th)	3.2% (19th)
3	December 25, 2024	4.0% (15th)	3.5% (18th)
4	December 26, 2024	3.5% (15th)	3.0% (17th)
5	January 1, 2025	3.6% (19th)	N/A
6	January 2, 2025	4.0% (15th)	3.5% (17th)
7	January 8, 2025	3.1% (19th)	N/A
8	January 9, 2025	3.2% (20th)	N/A
9	January 15, 2025	3.0% (16th)	3.2% (14th)
10	January 16, 2025	3.2% (20th)	3.0% (20th)
11	January 22, 2025	3.2% (19th)	N/A
12	January 23, 2025	3.4% (16th)	3.5% (16th)
Average		3.5%	— (Note: Due to multiple unpublished ratings, the exact average rating is unknown.)
In the table above, the blue numbers represent the lowest ratings and the red numbers represent the highest ratings.; N/A denotes ratings that were not published.
