= ATM: Er Rak Error =

- Film poster
- Thai: ATM เออรัก เออเร่อ
- Directed by: Mez Tharatorn
- Written by: Aummaraporn Phandintong; Mez Tharatorn
- Produced by: Jira Maligool; Chenchonnee Soonthornsaratul; Suvimon Techasupinun; Vanridee Pongsittisak
- Starring: Chantavit Dhanasevi; Preechaya Pongthananikorn
- Cinematography: Kittiwat Saemarat
- Edited by: Thammarat Sumetsupachok
- Music by: Vichaya Vatanasapt
- Production company: GMM Tai Hub
- Distributed by: Vicol Entertainment
- Release date: 19 January 2012
- Running time: 123 minutes
- Country: Thailand
- Language: Thai
- Box office: ฿150.11 million

ATM: Er Rak Error (original: ATM เออรัก เออเร่อ) is a 2012 Thai language romantic comedy film that became one of Thailand's all-time top-grossing films shortly after its release. The story is about two romantically-involved coworkers who compete to retrieve a large quantity of money that was withdrawn by several people from a malfunctioning ATM.

== Plot ==
In a bank that forbids fraternization lest one person in the couple be forced out, Sua (Chantavit Dhanasevi) and Jib (Preechaya Pongthananikorn), two career-bound overachievers, have nevertheless been discreetly dating for 5 years. Frustrated with having to keep their relationship hidden, Sua and Jib decide to get married. However, neither is willing to resign from their jobs.

One day, a software error in one of the bank's ATMs in Chonburi causes it to malfunction, causing it to double the money it dispenses. Through two poor men, Pued (Thawat Pornrattanaprasert) and Paed (Chalermpol Tikumporntheerawong), word spreads quickly and the ATM draws a large crowd of ecstatic football spectators. ฿130,000 is withdrawn before the machine is shut down.

Jib and Sua make a bet that whoever recovers the money withdrawn from the ATM can remain employed, while the other must resign. Both go to extreme lengths to win. Jib tries to recover the money from the ones that withdrew through reasoning, while Sua uses more unorthodox strategies.

Pued used his ATM withdrawal to buy a motorcycle, while Paed used it to buy a golden tooth as well as a truck. Sua soon teams up with them in his attempt to recover the withdrawn money, unaware that they are two of the people who received double cash from the faulty ATM. Meanwhile, Jib finds that one of the people who benefited from the ATM, Madam Aummara (Puttachart Pongsuchart), had used the money to buy new machines for her laundry shop. Madam Aummara refuses to tell Jib anything. Later Sua meets Aummara's daughter, Gob (Sananthachat Thanapatpisal), who soon falls in love with him. Sua is unaware that she is actually Pued's girlfriend, and Pued is heartbroken when he learns of Gob's new infatuation.

Both Sua and Jib learn that Pued and Paed were two of the people that withdrew cash from the malfunctioning ATM, and convince them to confess. They also discover that the branch manager Pakorn Kulariboriboon (Pongkool Suebsung) had also withdrawn from the ATM, and force him to confess as well.

Sua learns that one of the people who withdrew from the ATM is Sergeant Sam (Anna Chuancheun), the same police officer who confronted him when his company car was towed, and also the owner of a crocodile that had previously chased Sua from a farm. After Sua buys a police costume and fake guns to attack Sam, he is jailed for posing as a policeman.

After his release from jail, Sua warns Jib about Sergeant Sam, but Jib assumes that Sua is tricking her. Sua then rides Paed's truck with Pued, Aummara, and Gob (who finds out that he is a relationship with Jib) to save Jib, who has been cornered by the crocodile and Sam. The ensuing fight leads to the accidental shooting of Jack, the crocodile. Jack is rushed to the hospital. When they find news of the atrocious medical expenses for Jack's recovery, Jib decides to pay for them. Pued and Gob reconcile also.

Because Pued, Paed, Aummara, Gob, and Sam have both used the money that they've withdrawn, Sua and Jib realize they cannot recover the money. Later, Sua returns ฿130,000 of his own money to the bank manager, money intended for his marriage with Jib. Jib, who has had to resign her job due to her relationship being discovered by Yeoh (Gornpop Janjaroen), is displeased by this, so she and Sua break off the relationship and cancel the wedding. Then on October 31, Halloween, the date they were supposed to get married, Sua and Jib, after a brief skirmish, reconcile and kiss in the end.

== Cast ==
- Chantavit Dhanasevi - Sua
- Preechaya Pongthananikorn - Jib
- Anna Chuancheun - Sergeant Sam
- Pongsatorn Jongwilak - Danai
- Puttachat Pongsuchat - Madam Aummara
- Thawat Pornrattanaprasert - Pued
- Sananthachat Thanapatpisal - Gob
- Chaleumpol Tikumpornteerawong - Paed
- Gornpop Janjaroen - Yeoh
- Yanee Tramoth
- Pongkool Suebsung - Pakorn Kulariboriboon

A number of well-known Thai footballers and other figures had cameo appearances in the film.

== Reception ==
Within four weeks of the film's release, ATM: Er Rak Error had grossed over ฿150 million, making it Thailand's seventh top-grossing film at the time and GTH's highest grossing film until it was surpassed in 2013 by Pee Mak.

== Accolades ==
- Nominated –Thailand National Film Association Awards, Best Actress (Preechaya Pongthananikorn), 2013
- Won – Bangkok Critic's Assembly, Top Grossing Film Award, 2013
- Nominated – Osaka Asian Film Festival, Best Director (Mez Tharatorn), 2013
