= Narilya Gulmongkolpech =

Thai model and actress (born 2000)

- นริลญา กุลมงคลเพชร
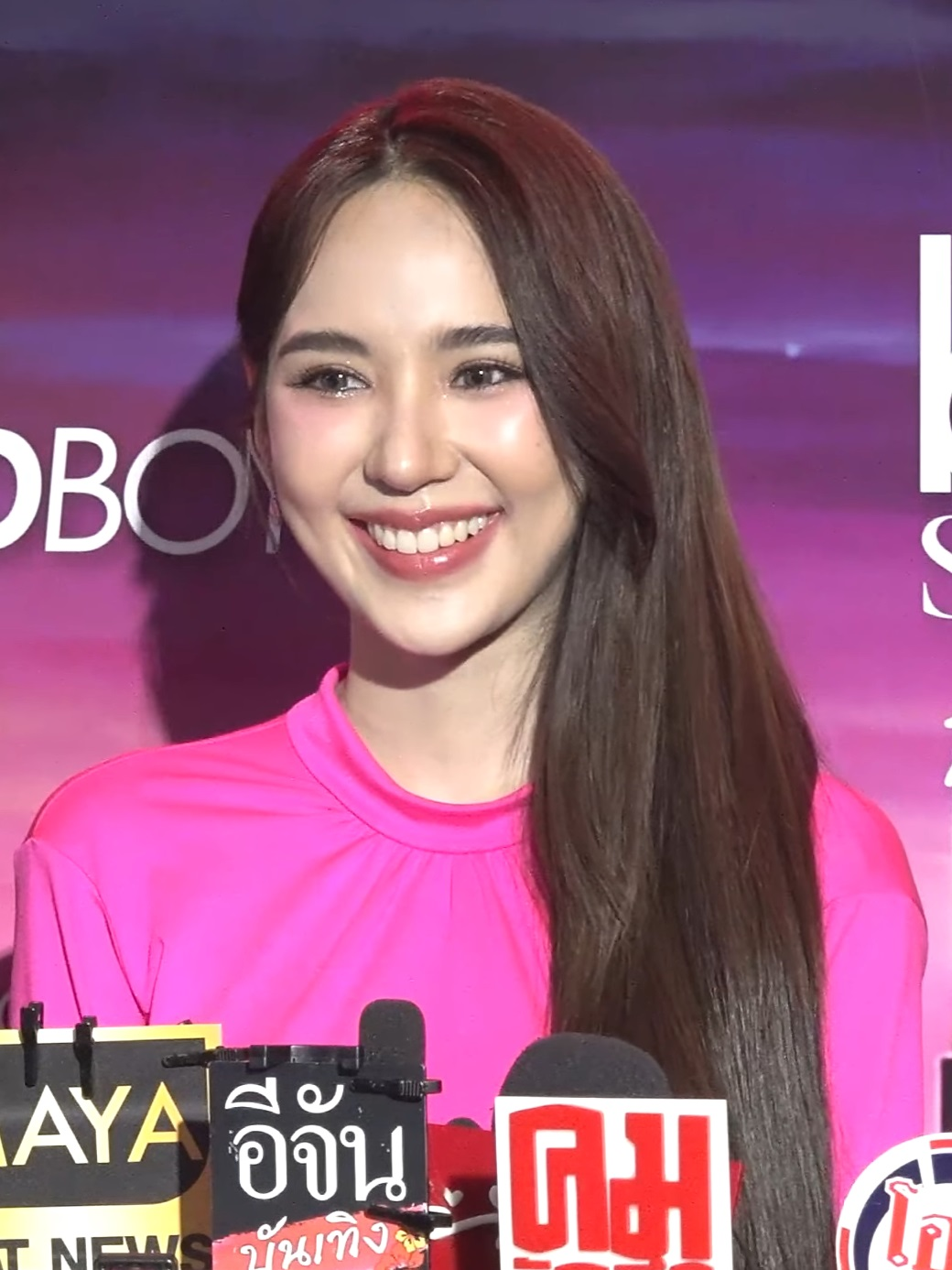
- Narilya in 2024
- Born: Natthida Trichaiya; 26 March 2000 (age 26); Suphanburi, Thailand
- Other name: Yada (ญดา)
- Education: Rangsit University
- Occupation: Actress
- Years active: 2015–present
- Agent: Channel 3 HD (2022–present)
- Notable work: The Medium
- Height: 164 cm (5 ft 5 in)

Narilya Gulmongkolpech (Thai: นริลญา กุลมงคลเพชร, RTGS: Narinya Kunlamongkhonphet; born Natthida Trichaiya; 26 March 2000), is a Thai actress, best known for her role as Mink in the 2021 film The Medium.

== Biography ==
Narilya was born Natthida Trichaiya (Thai: ณัฐธิดา ตรีชัยยะ; nicknamed Benz) on March 26, 2000, she is the youngest daughter in the family with one older brother. She graduated with a bachelor's degree from communication arts at Rangsit University.

In 2014, she made her acting debut in the television boy love series Love Sick.

In 2021, she played Mink in the horror movie The Medium, directed by Banjong Pisanthanakun. It was selected as the Thai entry for the Best International Feature Film at the 94th Academy Awards.

Later in 2022, she signed a contract with Channel 3. She debuted her first drama in Duangjai Dhevaprom and Suphapburut Juthathep.

In 2024, she played lead role in Netflix series, Master of the House.

== Personal life ==
In July 2025 came out as a lesbian.

== Filmography ==
=== Film ===
Year	Title	Role	Notes
2016	Sugar Café	Pancha	Lead role
2018	Make Money	Money	Main Role
2021	The Medium	Mink	Main Role
2022	Postman	Nual	Main Role
TBA	Nak Rak Mak... Mak Mak	Nak	Main Role
TBA	The Crawling Beast of Prey		

=== Television series ===
Year	Title	Role
2014	Love Sick Season 2	Pam
2016	Bussaba Rae Fun	Celebrity
2016	Naree Rissaya	Saiparn Singhadecha
2020	The Gifted Detective	Ployfon
2020	The Seawave	Namphet
2021	Sweet Secret	Chocco
2021	Dark App	Ploy
2022	The Wife	Nudee
2023	Game Prattana	Wianna Methamas (young)
2023	The Cheery Lee, Village Headman	Khaomai
2023	Coin Digger	Jane
2024	Master of the House	Khaimuk
2025	Chom Chai Ayothaya	Phiangrung
2026	Play Park	Ing
2026	Plerng Phra Nang	Sekkhara Dhewi
