= Balenciaga (surname) =

- Place of origin: Spain

Balenciaga is a surname from the Basque Country. Balenciaga is the Spanish language transliteration of the basque Balentziaga.

Following Basque naming customs, the name is a toponymic meaning house or place of the whaler, referring to the patronymic house of a family originally devoted to whaling. It is derived from the Basque words bale(a) (whale), ontzi (boat or ship) and the locative suffix '-aga', combined to form bale+(o)ntzi+aga, Balentziaga.

Notable people with the surname include:

- Cristóbal Balenciaga (1895–1972), Spanish Basque fashion designer and the founder of the Balenciaga fashion house
- Mariah Paris Balenciaga (born 1981), American drag queen
- Rasri Balenciaga (born 1990), Thai actress
