= Inherit (film) =

2026 Thai horror film

- Thai: คุณยายวรนาฏ
- Directed by: Banjong Pisanthanakun
- Screenplay by: Banjong Pisanthanakun; Thammasathit Charoenritthichai; Chantavit Dhanasevi
- Based on: Tayat Asoon (Note: Thai: ทายาทอสูร, RTGS: Thayat Asun, lit. 'Heir [of the] Demon') by Tri Aphirum
- Produced by: Banjong Pisanthanakun; Veerachai Yaikawong
- Starring: Davika Hoorne; Thitiya Jirapornsilp; Sinjai Plengpanich; Trin Settachoke; Warattaya Nilkuha
- Cinematography: Naruphol Chokanapitak
- Edited by: Thammarat Sumethsupachok
- Music by: Chatchai Pongprapaphan; Ardsanai Ardsakul
- Production companies: GDH 559; Tofu Films
- Distributed by: GDH 559
- Release dates: 14 September 2026 (Toronto); 19 November 2026 (Thailand)
- Running time: 128 minutes
- Country: Thailand
- Language: Thai

Inherit (Thai: คุณยายวรนาฏ; RTGS: Khun Yai Woranat, lit. 'Grandmother Woranart') is a 2026 Thai supernatural horror film directed by Banjong Pisanthanakun, starring Davika Hoorne, based on the Thai horror novel Tayat Asoon (1991) by Tri Aphirum. The film was written by Banjong Pisanthanakun, Thammasathit Charoenritthichai, and Chantavit Dhanasevi and was produced by GDH 559 in collaboration with Tofu Films.

The film premiered at the 2026 Toronto International Film Festival on 14 September 2026. It was released in theatres in Thailand on 19 November 2026.

== Synopsis ==
The film revolves around the mystery surrounding a family when Woranart, an 85-year-old woman who disappeared for over half a century, suddenly returns. However, she perplexingly appears as a young, beautiful, and alluring woman, bearing a mysterious centipede tattoo on her body. Her return triggers deep suspicions among the family members, particularly regarding her past, which is tied to an ancient black magic ritual dating back over 800 years.

In reality, Woranart is the host of a malevolent demon, sustaining her youth and immortality through destruction and occult rituals. Her true motive for returning is to find the next bloodline "heir" to perform the "centipede regurgitation" ritual—a transfer of power and the demon's spirit before her current body reaches its expiration. As the mystery and creeping threat unfold, the family members are forced to confront the horror and dark secrets hidden within their lineage.

== Cast ==
- Davika Hoorne (Mai) as Woranart
- Thitiya Jirapornsilp (Baipor) as Aui
- Sinjai Plengpanich (Nok) as Sudaduang
- Trin Setthachoke as Olarn
- Warattaya Nilkuha (Jooy) as Saengboon
- Pongsathorn Jongvilas (Phuak) as Ratcharoj
- Pakin Kunaanuwit (Mark) as Rangsan
- Chayanon Phakthin (Thai) as Sonthat
- Natthawadee Pipoppoarnchai (Arhoung) as Naiyanet

== Soundtrack ==
The film's theme song, performed by Palmy, is a remake of the theme song for the 2001 television drama Thayat Asun, originally performed by Maneenuch Smerasut.

Inherit Soundtrack
No.	Title	Writer(s)	Artist	Length
1.	"Thayat Asun (ทายาทอสูร)"	Sutee Sangsareechon	Palmy	2:42

== Production ==
Banjong Pisanthanakun expressed a keen interest in Tayat Asoon, noting that despite the novel's age, it contains elements that remain remarkably ahead of its time. He developed the screenplay alongside Thammasathit Charoenritthichai and Chantavit Dhanasevi, a collaborative process that spanned nearly two years prior to principal photography. The core theme of the film focuses on Woranart's vengeance, with Davika Hoorne being the director's sole choice for the titular role. Banjong also recommended that she study Sharon Stone's performance as Catherine Tramell in the 1992 film Basic Instinct, as well as Anthony Hopkins' performance as Hannibal Lecter in The Silence of the Lambs (1991).

The film reimagines Woranart's character as a modern woman, departing from past television adaptations while preserving her terrifying nature. For the iconic centipede-regurgitation scene, the production team utilized miniature cameras to capture internal perspectives within Woranart's oral cavity.

== Release ==
Inherit screened at various international film festivals, including at the 51st Toronto International Film Festival where it made its world premiere in September 2026, as well as 31st Busan International Film Festival, Jakarta World Cinema Film Festival, and the 70th BFI London Film Festival.

In Thailand, the film premiered at the Inherit gala premiere held at Siam Paragon on 17 November 2026. The film was released in theatres on 19 November 2026.

== Marketing ==
On 8 October 2026, a promotional event for Inherit was held at the Central Court, CentralWorld, themed around the celebration of Woranart's 800th birthday.

Additionally, GDH collaborated with Siam Inter Multimedia to produce a manga-style comic book of the same name, which features a different ending from the film. It was released on 19 October 2026, one month prior to the film's theatrical release. They also partnered with Siam Board Games to produce a board game based on the film's premise.

== Sequel ==
During the Jakarta World Cinema festival, Banjong Pisanthanakun revealed the possibility of a sequel to Inherit, with Davika set to reprise her role.
