= Davika Hoorne =

Thai actress (born 1992)

- ดาวิกา โฮร์เน่
- Hoorne in 2026
- Born: 16 May 1992 (age 34); Bangkok, Thailand
- Other name: Mai (ใหม่)
- Occupations: Actress; model; singer; YouTuber
- Years active: 2010–present
- Agent: Mine Media Production
- Notable work: Mae Nak in Pee Mak; Im in Heart Attack; Tantawan in My Ambulance; Nubdao in Astrophile
- Height: 1.75 m (5 ft 9 in)
- Spouse: Chantavit Dhanasevi (m. 2025)

Davika Hoorne (Thai: ดาวิกา โฮร์เน่; born 16 May 1992), known as Mai (Thai: ใหม่), is a Thai actress, model, singer and YouTuber. She made her acting debut in 2010, playing the lead in the series Ngao Kammathep. She rose to fame with the film Heart Attack (2015). Her other notable works are Twenty, Pee Mak (2013), My Ambulance (2019) and Astrophile (2022). She has won multiple awards for her work, including Best Actress for two consecutive years at the Thai Film Directors Association Awards and Best Actress at the 25th Suphannahong National Film Awards for her performance in romantic comedy-drama film Heart Attack (2015). In 2023, she has won Best Global Teleplay Leading Actress at the 36th Global Arts and Television Huading Awards.

== Early life and education ==
Davika was born to a Belgian father and a Thai mother in Bangkok. Her mother gave her the nickname "Mai", after Mai Charoenpura, her favorite singer. Her parents divorced when she was 10 years old, and then was raised by her mother and aunt.

In 2014, Davika bought a house, following her father's retirement, for him and his new family to live in Thailand.

Davika obtained her high school degree from Kevalee International School in Bangkok before graduating from Rangsit University's Faculty of Communication Arts with a Master's degree.

== Career ==
In 2010, Davika started as a model before making her acting debut in a female lead role in the television series Ngao Kammathep, and rose to fame with the films Heart Attack aka 'Freelance', is a movie made by top indie director Nawapol Thamrongrattanarit for GTH, which won eight Golden Swans at the Subannahongsa Award. In 2013, she consolidated her stardom with her role as “Mae Nak” in Pee Mak Phra Khanong, a highly successful movie that garnered more than 1 billion baht in revenue. Pee Mak was a box-office hit in many Asian and Australian cities.

“Every role and character has a meaningful backstory, each one continues to be a learning experience for me.” - Davikah Hoorne

In 2016, Davika returned to the silver screen with the comedy movie Suddenly Twenty, a Thai adaptation of the megahit Korean flick Miss Granny.

In 2019, Davika started in My Ambulance showcased by One 31 and LINE TV, alongside Sunny Suwanmethanon, which gained worldwide success. She collaborated with the South Korean singer Ali in a music video entitled “No Way” under Genie Music and Vietnamese singer So’n Tùng M-TP in “Run Now”, for the shows soundtrack.

In 2022 under GMMTV, Davika starred as a lead "Nubdao", in the romantic series Astrophile alongside Vachirawit Chivaaree, which was successful in national and international market, and was trending at rank 1 in Thailand and rand 2 worldwide. She also starred as "Keetika" in You Are My Heartbeat.

In 2023, Davika starred as a lead in Love Hurts, alongside Suppasit Jongcheeveevat and Jes Jespipat under ONEHD.

== Endorsements ==
Davika has participated in all of the Big Five global fashion weeks. In 2013, she walked in Tokyo Fashion Week. In 2017, Davika modelled for Michael Kors in New York Fashion Week 2017. She is a spokesperson for famous brand L'Oréal. On 30 September 2018, she walked the runway at the L'Oréal Paris Fashion Week. At Milan, Italy during "Milan Fashion Week" Spring/Summer collection, she has walked the runway for the Dolce & Gabbana "Ready to Wear". According to Vogue, she was Milan Fashion Week's Most Compelling Newcomer. In February 2024, she participated in Gucci's show during Milan Fashion Week.

In 2017, Davika was chosen to be the new brand ambassador for Bolon Eyewear.

"Davika Hoorne, known for her exquisite sense of fashion and style, is the perfect fit to represent the brand with glamour and elegance." - Bolon Eyewear

Davika starred in fashion brand Pomelo's special in-app video function, an engaging and interactive dimension, livestream shopping event. She is ambassador for 'Brand's Bird Nest' energy healthcare drink.

In 2021, Davika attended the Gucci FW21, as a celebrity friend. In 2022, she as a Brand Ambassador attended Gucci's "Cosmogonie Fashion Show" in Castle del Monte, Italy.

In September 2022, L'Officiel Malaysia celebrated its 7th anniversary with a "Shapeshifter" theme, were Davika starred on the cover in Gucci attire. In November 2022, at Bulgari's High Jewellery collection "Eden: The Garden Of Wonders" presentation in Bangkok, Davika was named the Italian jeweller's House Friend for the South Asia Pacific region.

In February 2023, Davika was a guest invitee in Marvel Studio movie launch events, Thailand. In May 2023, she did a fashion photoshoot for Calvin Klein Jeans in Seoul, Korea. Later, in October 2023, Davika was appointed as first Thai brand ambassador for Gucci and Gucci Beauty. Since January 2024, Gucci announced that Davika was selected as its Global Brand Ambassador.

== Philanthropy ==
In December 2016, Davika joined UNICEF in support of the Basket of Hope fundraising campaign to help children affected by emergencies across the world.

In October 2018, Davika joined WildAid as Thailand's ambassador for the "Ivory Free" campaign, as she has a deep affinity for elephants. She dissuaded consumers from buying, using or accepting ivory as a gift, and endorsed the message: "Ivory is beautiful only on elephants".

== Public image ==
Davika with more than 18.2M followers on Instagram, is the most followed female artist within the Thai industry. She's among the "Top 3: Most Powerful Actress as Brand Ambassador" in Thailand.

== Personal life ==
Since 2018, Davika has a relationship with Chantavit Dhanasevi. On June 11, 2025, Chantavit proposed to Davika with a large diamond ring. They married at the boutique hotel Maison Mystique in Khao Yai, Thailand on November 10.

== Filmography ==
=== Film ===
Year	Title	Role	Notes	Ref.
2012	Fatherland	Rachida	First film	
2013	Pee Mak	Mae Nak	Thai's highest-grossing film of all time	
2014	The Scar	Riam	Film is based on Thai folklore	
2015	Heart Attack	Im	Romantic Comedy	
2015	Prissana	Mai	Short film	
2016	Suddenly Twenty	Parn	Remake of the South Korean movie	
2025	A Useful Ghost	Nat	Arthouse film	
2026	Inherit	Woranat	Horror film	

=== Variety shows ===
Year	Title	Channel	Notes	Ref.
2023	The Wall Song	Workpoint Official	Participant; Ep.138	
2024	Sisters Who Make Waves Season 4	Mango TV	Participant	

=== Television series ===
Year	Title	Role	Network	Ref.
2010	Ngao Kammathep	Tien	Channel 7	
2011	Neur Manoot	Kratin / Inthuka	Channel 7	
2011	Dok Kaew	Dok Kaew	Channel 7	
2012	Maya Rasamee	Maya Rasamee / Duenram	Channel 7	
2012	Tawan Tor Saeng	Rasa / Rot	Channel 7	
2013	Roy Lae Sanae Luang	Anuch Wichawet / Nuch	Channel 7	
2014	Kularb Rai Kong Naai Tawan	Rose / Rosarin	Channel 7	
2015	Nang Chada	Rinlanee	Channel 7	
2016	Jao Wayha 1: Fang Nam Jarod Fah	Lieutenant Tuptim (cameo)	True4U	
2016	Plerng Naree	Risa / Princess Pririsa	Channel 3	
2017	Diary Of Tootsies 2	Jenny (cameo)	GMM 25	
2017	Love Beyond Time	Preanuan	Channel 3	
2017	Man is not real woman	Sarin Mungman / Rin / Saranya / Xin	ONEHD	
2018	Awaiting Bride	Riam	ONEHD	
2019	My Ambulance	Tantawan	ONEHD	
2021	Wanthong	Wanthong	ONEHD	
2022	You are My Heartbeat	Keetika	PPTV 36	
2022	Astrophile	Nubdao	GMM 25	
2023	Love Hurts	Wey	ONEHD	
2023	6ixtynin9: The Series	Ms. Toom / Monruedee Sarnpan	Netflix	
2024	The Empress of Ayodhaya	Sri Sudachan (Jinda)	ONEHD	

=== Music videos ===
Year	Song title	Artist	Channel	Ref.
2013	"Oh Please"	Nat Thewphaingam	True Fantasia	
2013	"Rawang.. Khun Gamlang Ngao"	Sukrit Wisetkaew		
2017	"No Way"	Ali	1theK	
2017	"Rawạng"	Hugo		
2018	"Run Now (Chạy Ngay Đi)"	Sơn Tùng M-TP	Official Video	
2022	"Temperamental" (เจ้าอารมณ์)	STAMP Ft. เปาวลี	STAMP Apiwat	
2022	"Counting Stars" (คืนนับดาว); Astrophile	Fluke Gawin	GMMTV Records	
2023	"Everyone Else Fades"	Mark Tuan		

== Discography ==
=== Covers and live recordings ===
Year	Title	Artist	Channel	Ref.
2023	"Mr. Daydream"	Davika	Davikah Channel	
2023	"B Blood Type" (เลือดกรุ๊ปบี)	Bright Vachirawit Chivaaree x Davika	Workpoint Official	

=== Singing journals ===
Year	Song Title	Label	Ref.
2016	"Chun Ja Fun Teung Tur"	Official Video	
2019	"Heartbeat" (ตกหลุมรัก)	Official Video	
2023	"Can I Call You Mine" (ชอบป่ะเนี่ย)	Davikah Channel	

== Awards and nominations ==
Year	Award	Category	Nominated work	Result	Ref.
2011	6th OK! Awards	Female Rising Star	Ngao Kammathep	Won	
2011	4th Siam Dara Star Awards	Female Rising Star	Ngao Kammathep	Nominated	
2011	Entertainment 5 Page 1 Awards	Female Rising Star	Dok Kaew	Won	
2012	24th Mekkala Awards	Female Rising Star	Dok Kaew	Won	
2012	5th Siam Dara Star Awards	Female Young Actor Award	Maya Rasamee	Nominated	
2012	7th OK! Awards	Female Hot Stuff	—N/a	Nominated	
2013	3rd Mthai Top Talk Awards	Top-Talk About Actress	Tawan Tor Saeng	Won	
2013	7 Color Intimate Gathering	Top Performer – Female	Tawan Tor Saeng	Nominated	
2013	100 Most Spicy Idols Awards	One of the 100 Most Spicy Idols	—N/a	Won	
2013	Channel 7 Sang San Awards	Leading Actress Award	Tawan Tor Saeng	Nominated	
2013	Channel 7 Sang San Awards	Leading Actress Performance Award	Tawan Tor Saeng	Nominated	
2013	Channel 7 Sang San Awards	Channel 7 Favorite Female Actress	Tawan Tor Saeng	Nominated	
2013	7th Kazz Awards	Top Actress Award	—N/a	Nominated	
2013	7th Kazz Awards	Superstar Award – Female	—N/a	Won	
2013	Star's Light Awards	The Most Gorgeous Eyes	—N/a	Won	
2013	Star's Light Awards	Top Sexy Stars	—N/a	Won	
2013	24th Star Party TV Pool Awards	Teen Idol Actress Award	—N/a	Won	
2013	6th Siam Dara Star Awards	Best Actress (Film)	Pee Mak	Won	
2013	6th Siam Dara Star Awards	Most Popular Female Star	—N/a	Nominated	
2013	11th Seventeen Choice Awards	Hot Girl of the Year	—N/a	Won	
2013	2nd Kerd Awards	Born to be Famous Award	—N/a	Nominated	
2013	2nd Kerd Awards	Born to be the Best	—N/a	Won	
2013	2nd Kerd Awards	Born to be Together (with Mario Maurer)	Pee Mak	Nominated	
2013	8th OK! Awards	Spotlight	Pee Mak	Won	
2013	8th OK! Awards	Male Heartthrob	—N/a	Nominated	
2014	8th Kazz Awards	Top Actress Award	—N/a	Nominated	
2014	8th Kazz Awards	Superstar Award – Female	—N/a	Nominated	
2014	3rd Daradaily the Great Awards	Hot Girl of the Year	—N/a	Nominated	
2014	3rd Daradaily the Great Awards	Best Actress (Film)	Pee Mak	Won	
2014	23rd Thailand National Film Association Awards	Best Actress	Pee Mak	Nominated	
2014	7th Siam Dara Star Awards	Best Actress (TV)	Kularb Rai Kong Naai Tawan	Nominated	
2014	7th Siam Dara Star Awards	Most Popular Female Star	Kularb Rai Kong Naai Tawan	Won	
2014	ZEN Stylish Awards	ZEN Stylish Women	—N/a	Won	
2014	12th Seventeen Choice Awards	Seventeen Choice Actress	—N/a	Won	
2014	9th OK! Awards	Female Hot Stuff	—N/a	Nominated	
2014	1st EFM Awards	Most Popular Actor – February	Kularb Rai Kong Naai Tawan	Nominated	
2014	1st EFM Awards	Most Popular Actor – August	The Scar	Nominated	
2015	12th Starpics Thai Film Awards	Best Actress	The Scar	Nominated	
2015	4th Daradaily the Great Awards	Hot Girl of the Year	—N/a	Nominated	
2015	4th Daradaily the Great Awards	Best Actress (TV)	Kularb Rai Kong Naai Tawan	Nominated	
2015	4th Daradaily the Great Awards	Best Actress (Film)	The Scar	Nominated	
2015	24th Thailand National Film Association Awards	Best Actress	The Scar	Nominated	
2015	5th Mthai Top Talk Awards	Top Talk-About Actress	The Scar, Kularb Rai Kong Naai Tawan	Nominated	
2015	8th Nine Entertain Awards	Best Actress	The Scar, Kularb Rai Kong Naai Tawan	Nominated	
2015	9th Kazz Awards	Superstar Award – Female	—N/a	Nominated	
2015	30th Saraswati Royal Awards	Best Actress	The Scar	Nominated	
2015	30th Saraswati Royal Awards	Popular Actress Award	The Scar	Won	
2015	12th Kom Chad Luek Awards	Best Actress (Film)	The Scar	Nominated	
2015	2nd EFM Awards	Most Popular Actor – April	Nang Chada	Nominated	
2015	8th Siam Dara Star Awards	Best Actress (TV)	Nang Chada	Won	
2015	8th Siam Dara Star Awards	Most Popular Female Star	—N/a	Nominated	
2015	1st Maya Awards	Best Actress (Film)	The Scar	Nominated	
2015	1st Maya Awards	Best Actress (TV)	Nang Chada	Nominated	
2015	13th Seventeen Choice Awards	Seventeen Choice Actress	—N/a	Won	
2015	10th OK! Awards	Female Hot Stuff	—N/a	Nominated	
2016	5th Daradaily the Great Awards	Best Actress (Film)	Heart Attack	Nominated	
2016	7th Bioscope Awards	Best Performance of the Year	Heart Attack	Won	
2016	6th Thai Film Director Awards	Best Actress	Heart Attack	Won	
2016	13th Starpics Thai Films Awards	Best Actress	Heart Attack	Won	
2016	25th Thailand National Film Association Awards	Best Actress	Heart Attack	Won	
2016	13th Kom Chad Luek Awards	Best Actress (Film)	Heart Attack	Won	
2016	24th Bangkok Critics Assembly Awards	Best Actress	Heart Attack	Won	
2016	4th Mekkala Star Awards	Star Vote Good of the Year	—N/a	Nominated	
2016	10th Kazz Awards	Superstar Award – Female	—N/a	Won	
2016	10th Kazz Awards	Popular Vote – Female	—N/a	Nominated	
2016	9th Nine Entertain Awards	Best Actress	Nang Chada, Heart Attack	Nominated	
2016	9th Nine Entertain Awards	Public Favorite	—N/a	Nominated	
2016	1st Dara Inside Awards	Popular Actress	Nang Chada	Nominated	
2016	2nd Maya Awards	Best Actress (Film)	Heart Attack	Won	
2016	9th Siam Dara Stars Awards	Best Actress (Film)	Heart Attack	Nominated	
2016	9th Siam Dara Stars Awards	Most Popular Female Star	—N/a	Nominated	
2016	Men's Health	Stunning Lady of the Year	—N/a	Won	
2017	6th Daradaily the Great Awards	Best Actress (Film)	Suddenly Twenty	Nominated	
2017	3rd Fever Awards	Best Actress (Film)	Suddenly Twenty	Won	
2017	5th Howe Awards	Howe Diva Award	—N/a	Won	
2017	26th Thailand National Film Association Awards	Best Actress	Suddenly Twenty	Nominated	
2017	8th Bioscope Awards	Best Performance of the Year	Suddenly Twenty	Won	
2017	7th Mthai Top Talk Awards	Top-Talk About Actress	Plerng Naree	Nominated	
2017	11th OK! Awards	Female Hot Stuff	—N/a	Nominated	
2017	14th Starpics Thai Films Awards	Best Actress	Suddenly Twenty	Nominated	
2017	25th Bangkok Critics Assembly Awards	Best Actress	Suddenly Twenty	Won	
2017	7th Thai Film Director Awards	Best Actress	Suddenly Twenty	Won	
2017	11th Kazz Awards	Superstar Award – Female	—N/a	Won	
2017	11th Kazz Awards	Best Couple (with Pimchanok Luevisadpaibul)	—N/a	Nominated	
2017	11th Kazz Awards	Popular Vote – Female	—N/a	Nominated	
2017	10th Nine Entertain Awards	Best Actress	Plerng Naree, Suddenly Twenty	Nominated	
2017	14th Kom Chad Luek Awards	Best Actress (Film)	Suddenly Twenty	Won	
2017	14th Kom Chad Luek Awards	Popular Vote – Actress	Suddenly Twenty	Nominated	
2017	12th Asia Model Awards	Asia Special Award – Actress	—N/a	Won	
2017	3rd Maya Awards	Charming Girl	—N/a	Won	
2017	5th Ganesha Award	Best Actress	Plerng Naree	Won	
2017	2nd Dara Inside Awards	Popular Actress	Plerng Naree	Nominated	
2018	LINE TV Awards	Best Viral Scene	Chai Mai Jing Ying Tae	Won	
2018	LINE TV Awards	Best Couple (with Chantavit Dhanasevi)	Chai Mai Jing Ying Tae	Nominated	
2018	Sanook! Top Vote of the Year	Dream Girl Award	—N/a	Nominated	
2018	12th Kazz Awards	Superstar Award – Female	—N/a	Nominated	
2018	31st Saraswati Royal Awards	Popular Female Actress	—N/a	Nominated	
2018	4th Maya Awards	Charming Girl	—N/a	Nominated	
2018	4th Maya Awards	Best Actress (TV)	Chai Mai Jing Ying Tae	Nominated	
2018	4th Maya Awards	Best Couple (with Chantavit Dhanasevi)	Chai Mai Jing Ying Tae	Nominated	
2018	3rd Dara Inside Awards	Popular Actress	Chai Mai Jing Ying Tae	Nominated	
2018	6th Thailand Headlines Person of the Year Awards	Culture and Entertainment – Actress	—N/a	Won	
2018	12th OK! Awards	Female Hot Stuff	—N/a	Nominated	
2019	33rd TV Gold Awards	Best Female Star Award	—N/a	Nominated	
2019	13th Kazz Awards	Popular Vote	—N/a	Nominated	
2019	8th Daradaily The Great Awards	Popular Vote – Female	—N/a	Nominated	
2019	5th Maya Awards	Charming Girl	—N/a	Nominated	
2019	5th Maya Awards	Best Actress (TV)	Nang Sao Mai Jam Kad Nam Sakul	Nominated	
2019	4th Dara Inside Awards	Popular Actress	Nang Sao Mai Jam Kad Nam Sakul	Nominated	
2019	1st Zoomdara Awards	Zoomdara of the Year	—N/a	Nominated	
2019	1st Zoomdara Awards	Zoom Female Lead	My Ambulance	Nominated	
2020	3rd LINE TV Awards	Best Viral Scene	My Ambulance	Nominated	
2020	3rd LINE TV Awards	Best Kiss Scene (with Sunny Suwanmethanont)	My Ambulance	Nominated	
2020	14th Kazz Awards	Top Actress Award	My Ambulance	Nominated	
2020	11th Nataraj Awards	Best Actress	My Ambulance	Nominated	
2020	11th Nataraj Awards	Best Ensemble Cast	My Ambulance	Nominated	
2020	6th Maya Awards	Best Actress (TV)	My Ambulance	Nominated	
2020	6th Maya Awards	Charming Girl		Nominated	
2021	7th Maya Awards	Popular Actress		Nominated	
2021	7th Maya Awards	Charming Girl		Nominated	
2021	3rd Zoomdara Awards	Zoom Actress		Nominated	
2022	Maya Entertain Awards	Charming Girl		Nominated	
2022	Maya Entertain Awards	Popular Vote of Maya		Nominated	
2022	Lifestyle Asia Award	Best Actress: Influencer's Choice		Won	
2022	13th Nataraja Awards	Best Actress	Wanthong	Won	
2022	36th TV Gold Awards	Outstanding Leading Actress	Wanthong	Nominated	
2022	18th Komchadluek Awards	Best Actress in TV Drama	Wanthong	Won	
2023	11th Thailand Social Awards	Best Creator Performance on Social Media		Nominated	
2023	36th Global Arts and Television Huading Awards	Best Global Teleplay Leading Actress		Won	
2023	37th TV Gold Awards	Outstanding Leading Actress	You are My Heartbeat	Nominated	
2023	14th Nataraja Awards	Best Actress	You are My Heartbeat	Nominated	
2024	15th Nataraja Awards	Best Actress in a Primetime Long-Form Drama	Love Hurts	Nominated	
2024	15th Nataraja Awards	Best Actress in a Webseries	6ixtynin9: The Series	Won	
2025	16th Nataraja Awards	Best Actress in a Primetime Miniseries	The Empress of Ayodhaya	Nominated	
2025	39th TV Gold Awards	Outstanding Leading Actress	The Empress of Ayodhaya	Won	
2026	15th Thai Film Director Awards	Best Actress	A Useful Ghost	Runner-up	
2026	22nd Kom Chad Luek Awards	Best Actress in Film	A Useful Ghost	Nominated	
2026	34th Bangkok Critics Assembly Awards	Best Actress	A Useful Ghost	Nominated	
2026	34th Suphannahong National Film Awards	Best Actress	A Useful Ghost	Won	
