= Mon Chanthra =

- Also known as: Spell of the Moon
- มนต์จันทรา
- Starring: Chakrit Yamnam; Rasri Balenciaga
- Country of origin: Thailand
- Original language: Thai
- No. of episodes: 11

Production
- Producer: TV Scene
- Production location: Thailand
- Running time: Wednesday - Thursday

Original release
- Network: Channel 3
- Release: 16 May – 21 June 2013

Mon Chanthra is a 2013 Thai drama that stars Chakrit Yamnam and Rasri Balenciaga in Channel 3.

== Synopsis ==
Waree (Rasri Balenciaga) is a young reporter who is aiming to write a story about a secretive casino owned by Sama (Chakrit Yamnam), unknown to her they have a history, since when they were just kids young Sama gave her some money in order to take care of her sick mother who later died, but in order to return his kindness to her she save him from being killed by hoodlums in the casino. Now as an adult Waree is disgusted of gambling and casinos because her father was a gambler and abandoned them when she, her mother, and twin sister needed him the most.

== Cast ==
- Chakrit Yamnam as Sama
- Rasri Balenciaga as Sarawaree "Waree"/Sarasama
- Porchita Na Songkhla as Sophie
- Danai Jarujinda as Pipat
- Sarocha Watitapun as Lampaeng
