= The Medium (2021 film) =

2021 Thai–South Korean supernatural folk horror film

- Theatrical release poster
- Directed by: Banjong Pisanthanakun
- Screenplay by: Chantavit Dhanasevi; Na Hong-jin
- Story by: Na Hong-jin; Choi Cha-won
- Produced by: Na Hong-jin; Banjong Pisanthanakun
- Starring: Narilya Gulmongkolpech; Sawanee Utoomma; Sirani Yankittikan; Yasaka Chaisorn
- Cinematography: Naruphol Chokanapitak
- Edited by: Thammarat Sumethsupachok
- Music by: Chatchai Ponhprapaphan
- Production companies: GDH 559; Showbox; Northern Cross
- Distributed by: GDH 559 (Thailand); Showbox (South Korea)
- Release dates: 11 July 2021 (BIFAN); 14 July 2021 (South Korea); 28 October 2021 (Thailand)
- Running time: 131 minutes
- Countries: Thailand; South Korea
- Languages: Thai; Isan
- Box office: US$7.23 million

The Medium (Thai: ร่างทรง Rang Song, literally: Mediumship) is a 2021 Isan-language pseudo-documentary supernatural folk horror film co-written and produced by Na Hong-jin and directed by Banjong Pisanthanakun. It is a co-production of Thailand's GDH 559 and South Korea's Showbox. The film premiered at the 25th Bucheon International Fantastic Film Festival on 11 July 2021. It was theatrically released in South Korea on 14 July 2021. It was selected as the Thai entry for the Best International Feature Film at the 94th Academy Awards but was not nominated.

The film was judged the best feature film at the 25th Bucheon International Fantastic Film Festival and was awarded the Bucheon Choice Award for the best film. On the box office front as per Korean Film Council data, it is ranked 15th among all the films released in the year 2021 in South Korea, with gross of US$7.35 million and 831,126 admissions, as of 26 September 2021. It is the 6th highest-grossing Korean film of 2021.

== Plot ==
A documentary crew travels to the Isan region of Thailand to interview Nim, a medium who claims to be possessed by the spirit of Ba Yan, a local deity. She was chosen to be Ba Yan's host after her sister, Noi, refused to accept the role and converted to Christianity.

Nim attends the funeral of Noi's husband, Wiroj, who died of cancer, and reveals that misfortune has befallen the men in his family. Wiroj's father, a factory owner, killed himself after being caught committing insurance fraud. Wiroj's son, Mac, died in a traffic accident. Noi is left with her daughter, Mink, and they live with Manit (Nim and Noi's brother) and his family.

Mink starts behaving strangely and exhibiting multiple personalities, including those of an attention-seeking child, an old man, a drunkard, and a prostitute. She also hears voices in her head, has nightmares, and experiences abdominal pain and vaginal bleeding. She is fired from her job after her boss discovers that she has been having sex with different men at her workplace. Nim initially believes that these are signs that Ba Yan has selected Mink to be the next host, but Noi refuses to give her consent for a ceremony to transfer Ba Yan's spirit from Nim to Mink.

Nim later learns that Mink had committed incest with Mac, who had actually hanged himself, and believes that Mac's ghost is haunting Mink. After Mink attempts suicide, Noi thinks Ba Yan is punishing her for her earlier refusal to become Ba Yan's host by making her daughter suffer, so she arranges for another medium to conduct a ceremony to transfer Ba Yan's spirit to Mink. This is done without Nim's knowledge or approval. The ceremony fails; Mink becomes possessed by multiple spirits and attacks her mother before running away. In desperation, Nim advises Noi to open her heart to Ba Yan and seek forgiveness. Noi agrees and follows Nim to Ba Yan's shrine to pray.

A month later, Mink is found in a delirious state in the ruins of her grandfather's factory. Seeing Mink's condition, Nim visits Ba Yan's shrine once again, only to discover that the deity's statue has been decapitated. Nim confronts Mink and asks who they are, but Mink merely strips and taunts Nim, saying that Noi did everything she could to force Nim to become a shaman instead of her, including putting talismans in her shoes and making her wear her clothes.

Nim brings Mink to see Santi, a more powerful medium, who says that Mink has been possessed by numerous evil spirits. Mink's paternal ancestors had been cursed for committing many wicked deeds, hence the misfortunes that have befallen her family over the generations. The failed transference ceremony worsened Mink's condition by making her more vulnerable to possession by any spirit. Nim, along with Santi and his students, prepares for an elaborate ritual to exorcise Mink. In the days leading up to the ritual, Mink wreaks havoc at home by briefly abducting Manit's son, boiling the family's dog alive and eating it, among other things. Nim dies in her sleep the day before the ritual.

During the ritual, which is conducted at the ruined factory, Noi offers her body as a vessel to attract all the evil spirits haunting Mink so that Santi can exorcise her, trap all the spirits in a container, and bury it deep underground. Meanwhile, the possessed Mink has been locked in her room, and the door is sealed with paper charms; Manit's wife and others keep watch to ensure that she stays inside until the ritual is complete. Halfway through the ritual, Manit's wife hears her son's cries coming from Mink's room and thinks that Mink has kidnapped him again. She enters the room, only to be stabbed to death by Mink. All hell breaks loose when the evil spirits possess everyone involved in the ritual, causing them to fight and kill themselves or each other.

Meanwhile, Mink kills everyone at home and goes to the factory, where she encounters her mother and a few survivors. Now possessed by evil spirits, Noi momentarily claims to be Ba Yan's host when she chants a prayer while touching her daughter's head, attempting to exorcise her. This seems to work until she is distracted when Mink apparently returns to normal and calls her "Mother". Mink takes the opportunity to burn her mother alive, while the survivors are eventually overwhelmed by the possessed.

A mid-credits scene shows Nim undergoing a crisis of faith one day before her death. Before breaking down in tears, she wonders whether she has truly been possessed by Ba Yan or if she has been imagining it all along.

== Cast ==
- Narilya Gulmongkolpech as Mink
- Sawanee Utoomma as Nim
- Sirani Yankittikan as Noi
- Yasaka Chaisorn as Manit
- Boonsong Nakphoo as Santi
- Poon Mitpakdee as Mac

== Production ==
The film is shot in the Loei province in northeast Thailand (Isan).

The film was announced in February 2021, and was scheduled for a July 2021 release in South Korea.

== Release ==
The Medium is sold by Finecut for the upcoming European Film Market and the film's rights had been already acquired by The Jokers for future theatrical release in France, and by Koch Films to German-speaking territories. As of September, Shudder had acquired the overall streaming rights and it will stream in the US on October 14.

In Asia, the film has been licensed to Edko Films for Macau and Hong Kong (22 September 2021), MovieCloud for Taiwan (25 August 2021), Synca Creations for Japan (29 July 2022), to Encore Films for Malaysia (2 December 2021) and Indonesia (20 October 2021), Golden Village for Singapore (12 August 2021), M Pictures for Cambodia (26 November 2021) and Laos (6 January 2022) and Lumix Media for Vietnam (19 November 2021).

The film premiered on July 11, 2021, at the 25th Bucheon International Fantastic Film Festival, and it was released theatrically in South Korea on July 14, 2021.

=== Home media ===
The film was made available for streaming and broadcasting in South Korea on IPTV, Skylife, HomeChoice cable TV, KT Seezn and others from September 16, 2021.

== Reception ==
=== Box office ===
The film was released on 14 July 2021, on 1403 screens. According to the integrated computer network for movie theater admissions by the Korea Film Council (KoFiC), the film ranked at first place at the Korean box office on opening day by collecting 129,917 audiences, surpassing the audiences of Black Widow. On the 4th day of release, it became the highest-grossing film in the horror genre by surpassing US$2.67 million gross. The cumulative audience of the film stands at 403,019 as of 17 July 2021.

According to Korean Film Council (KOFIC) data, it is in 6th place among all the Korean films released in the year 2021, with gross of US$7.32 million and 831,126 admissions, as of 26 September 2021.

=== Critical response ===
The review aggregator Rotten Tomatoes reported that 81% of critics have given the film a positive review based on 31 reviews, with an average rating of 6.60/10.

Jo Yeon-kyung of JTBC Entertainment News rated the film with 4 out of 5 stars and wrote that the film has a dense narrative, and the sequences of worship and scenes of exorcism are combined with Thailand's unique culture to generate newness. Describing the scary parts of the film, Jo wrote, "The scariest thing is that the closer you get to the ending, the more you are getting used to the huge scene unfolding before your eyes. Of course, the level of understanding and impact may vary depending on the individual audience."

Seo Jeong-won writing for Maeil Business praised the performance of Narilya Gunmong Konket and opined, "I am so immersed in acting that I have to worry about the trauma that can occur." Warning the audience about some portions of the film that showed cannibalism, animal cruelty, self-harm, and incest, Seo wrote that they are careful as they might find it cruel. But in Seo's opinion those were essential to narrative.

Kong Rithdee gave the film a positive review in the Bangkok Post, praising its use of Thai folklore with the visual and narrative resemblance to South Korea thrillers.

Choi Young-joo of CBS No Cut News wrote that the film directed in the form of found footage, has a documentary character. Writing about the shamanic beliefs of the Isan region that not only humans but also everything in nature has a soul. Any action committed by ancestors became a curse and was passed down to posterity, in the context of the film it is the character Ming. Choi with respect to that belief wrote, "The Medium is a movie that makes you experience with your whole body that there are horror movies because there are human beings." Choi pointed out that in the film all the evils that humans can commit were in some way described, and although it was shown to portray human evil, it did come to mind as to how far and how it would be shown.

Variety praised the film's musical score, production design, and references to Thai culture, but criticized its length and the mockumentary format.

== Accolades ==
Year	Award	Category	Recipient(s)	Result	Ref.
2021	Bucheon Choice Features	Best Film	The Medium	Won	
2021	Maniatic Fantastic Film Festival	Best Film	The Medium	Won	
2021	San Sebastian Horror and Fantasy Film Week	Best Film	The Medium	Won	
2021	Molins Horror Film Festival	Best Cinematography	Naruphol Chokanapitak	Won	

== See also ==
- List of submissions to the 94th Academy Awards for Best International Feature Film
- List of Thai submissions for the Academy Award for Best International Feature Film
- Satsana Phi
- Thai folklore
- Thai horror
