= Coming Soon (2008 film) =

- Theatrical release poster
- Directed by: Sophon Sakdaphisit
- Written by: Sophon Sakdaphisit; Chanajai Tonsaithong; Kongkiat Komesiri
- Produced by: Jira Maligool; Yongyoot Thongkongtoon; Chenchonnee Soonthornsaratul; Chanajai Tonsaithong
- Starring: Vorakan Rojchanawat; Sakulrath Thomas; Chantavit Dhanasevi; Oraphan Arjsamat
- Cinematography: Somboon Phopitakkul
- Edited by: Thammarat Sumetsupachok
- Music by: Terdsak Janpan
- Production companies: GMM Tai Hub (GTH) Co. Ltd. Joy Luck Club Film House
- Distributed by: GMM Tai Hub
- Release date: 30 October 2008
- Running time: 80 minutes
- Country: Thailand
- Language: Thai
- Box office: $3,900,585

Coming Soon (Thai: โปรแกรมหน้า วิญญาณอาฆาต) is a 2008 Thai horror film starring Worrakarn Rotjanawatchra, Oraphan Arjsamat, Sakulrath Thomas, and Chantavit Dhanasevi. The film is the directorial debut for Sophon Sakdaphisit, who was the co-writer of the films Shutter (2004) and Alone (2007).

== Plot ==
Shane and Som watch a horror movie about a woman called Chaba who has kidnapped and murdered two children in a village. Just as she is chasing and about to kill a third victim, the villagers track her down, stop her, and eventually hanged her.

After watching the movie, Shane and Som feel disturbed yet curious, so they research the background of the movie and realise it is based on a real-life case from 30 years ago. While checking out the house where the event allegedly took place, Shane is injured after falling off the stairs. At the hospital, when a doctor asks them why they went to the house, they replied that they were there to find out more about Chaba. However, the doctor tells them that Chaba is still alive and currently in a mental facility.

Shane decides to dig deeper and eventually comes across one of the movie's behind-the-scenes video clips. In the clip, it is shown that Ingchan, the actress playing Chaba, had to reshoot the hanging scene multiple times as the director did not think it was realistic enough. Although she had a safety sling attached to her when the noose was around her neck, it turned out that the sling had snapped during the last take and she had actually died from hanging. That scene is used when the movie is released in theaters.

Having discovered the truth, Shane tells Som and warns her before rushing back to the theater to find her. In the theater, Shane is haunted by the vengeful ghost of Ingchan and ends up being supernaturally transported into the hanging scene of the movie. There, he finds the dead bodies of his co-workers and friends who had watched the movie. Som enters the theater and can only watch in horror and defeat on screen as Ingchan gouges out Shane's eyes, killing him.

Som ultimately suffers the same fate as Shane and ends up being supernaturally transported into the movie too. As the movie plays in a theater and shows the final scene of Ingchan being hanged, she suddenly comes to live and shouts at the audience, "Do you really want to see me die?"

== Critical reception ==
Slasherpool felt that the film had some decent scary moments and that the script was sound. They noted that first-time director Sopon Sukdapisit might not have had a lot of experience, with some obvious flaws, and "rookie" mistakes, and nothing very innovative, suggesting that he stick to writing. The opined that it "is a movie destined to be remade"..."worth watching if you're in the mood for a decent ghost story but don't expect to get blown away." When reviewed by Movie Exclusive, they summarized by saying "Coming Soon doesn't have enough to be an instant classic, but it bodes well for the GMM Tai Hub stable that they're still a force to be reckoned with when it comes to raking up the scares". The Fridae Movie Club thought the film had promise when they wrote "Coming Soon has a sharp film-within-a-film concept, further proof of Sophon Sakdaphisit’s screenwriting talents", but noted its lacks when writing "But the direction falls way short of the ambitious script." This same opinion was shared by Fangoria, which wrote "Sakdapisit tosses in a few effective setpieces and plenty of gouged-out eyes, but the majority of Coming Soon feels overly familiar and illogical".

== Additional sources ==
- Review at Dlanz Movies
- Review at Horror News
