= My Husband in Law =

2020 Thai television series

- Promotional poster
- Thai: อกเกือบหักแอบรักคุณสามี
- Genre: Romantic comedy
- Created by: Thong Entertainment
- Based on: My Husband in Law
- Written by: Navaroikavee (Thai: นาวาร้อยกวี)
- Screenplay by: Panathee Suppasaksutat
- Directed by: Ampaiporn Jitmaingong
- Creative director: Panomsak Sukprasert
- Starring: Prin Suparat; Nittha Jirayungyurn
- Country of origin: Thailand
- Original language: Thai
- No. of episodes: 15

Production
- Executive producer: Ann Thongprasom
- Production location: Thailand
- Cinematography: Pattana Pongsamai; Kraisorn Buranasingh; Jintapharp Sakkaew
- Editors: Q DAYTIME CLIMATE STUDIO CO., LTD.; Thanaat Kasuriya
- Camera setup: Sainan Somrod; Supan Sansuk; Sakda Srisawan
- Running time: 135 minutes
- Production company: Thong Entertainment

Original release
- Network: Channel 3
- Release: 21 April – 9 June 2020

My Husband in Law (Thai: อกเกือบหักแอบรักคุณสามี; RTGS: Ok Kueap Hak Aep Rak Khun Sami, which translates as "Heart Almost Broken, Secretly in Love with My Husband") is a 2020 Thai television series created by Thong Entertainment and directed by Ampaiporn Jitmaingong. It was written by Panathee Suppasaksutat, starring Prin Suparat and Nittha Jirayungyurn. The drama was aired by Channel 3 on Mondays and Tuesdays at 20:15 (ICT) time slot from April 21 to June 9, 2020. Tencent Video served as the broadcaster in mainland China.

== Cast ==
=== Starring ===
- Prin Suparat as Tianrawat Nawanawakun / "Tian"
- Nittha Jirayungyurn as Nateerin Sawatdirat / Nateerin Nawanawakun / "Muey"
- Rachwin Wongviriya as Yada
- Nut Devahastin as Pondech

=== Supporting ===
- Yong Armchair as Pariwat Nawanawakun / "Ri"
- Maneerat Sricharoon as Monwatoo Nawanawakun / "Mon"
- Lalana Kongtoranin as Kang
- Kanin Stanley as Kob
- Natthaphong Chatphong as Beer
- Thanakorn Chinakul as Toon
- Witsarut Himmarat as Nut
- Techin Ploypreche as Sed
- Kanidkun Nedbud as Tum
- Pitchapa Phanthumchinda as Nattamon / "Kawfang"
- Duangta Toongkamanee as Kun Nai Sajee Nawanawakun / "Pariwat, Thianwat 's mother"
- Angsana Buranon as Prapa Sawatdirat / "Nateerin 's mother"
- Surasak Chaieid as Tada (Yada 's fother)
- Tanupong Saktanawad as Satid

=== Others ===
- Boromwuti Hiranyatithi as Chad
- Benjawan Artner as Madtana
- Paweenut Pangnakorn as Je’ Kung
- Chadcharin Klaynak as Baramee
- Yuwadee Riengchay as Prophet
- Jenny Panan as A-Mia (Bamar people)
- Thongchai Thongkanthom as Mumu (Bamar people)
- Padtarawadee Pinthong as Kik (Bamar people)
- Viroj Tangvarnich as Sinsae’ (Prophet)

== Ratings ==
- In the table below, the blue number represents the lowest ratings and the red number represents the highest ratings.
- N/A denotes that the rating is not known.

Ep.	Original broadcast date	Average audience share	
Ep.	Original broadcast date	Nationwide	Bangkok
1	April 21, 2020	2.895%	4.430%
2	April 27, 2020	3.273%	5.284%
3	April 28, 2020	3.808%	5.488%
4	May 4, 2020	3.965%	5.723%
5	May 5, 2020	4.035%	—N/a
6	May 11, 2020	4.260%	6.780%
7	May 12, 2020	4.480%	—N/a
8	May 18, 2020	4.227%	7.047%
9	May 19, 2020	4.491%	7.436%
10	May 25, 2020	4.306%	7.531%
11	May 26, 2020	4.260%	6.374%
12	June 1, 2020	4.510%	6.818%
13	June 2, 2020	4.942%	7.377%
14	June 8, 2020	5.089%	8.127%
15	June 9, 2020	5.649%	9.092%
Average		4.279%	— (Note: Due to some ratings not recorded, the exact average rating is unknown.)
