= Master of the House (TV series) =

Thai television series

- Thai: สืบสันดาน
- Genre: Thriller; Mystery; Drama
- Created by: Kulp Kaljareuk
- Written by: Nat Nuanpang; Weerasu Worrapot; Vatanyu Ingkavivat; Sita Likitvanichkul; Athimes Arunrojangkul
- Directed by: Sivaroj Kongsakul
- Starring: Narilya Gulmongkolpech; Chartayodom Hiranyasthiti; Thanavate Siriwattanakul; Nusba Punnakanta; Claudia Chakrabandhu na Ayudhya; Teerapong Leowrakwong
- Country of origin: Thailand
- Original languages: Thai; English
- No. of episodes: 7

Production
- Executive producer: Kulp Kaljareuk
- Producer: Nattapong Suriya
- Cinematography: Pramett Chankrasae
- Camera setup: Multiple-camera setup
- Running time: 50 minutes
- Production company: Kantana Motion Pictures

Original release
- Network: Netflix
- Release: July 18, 2024 – present

Master of the House (Thai: สืบสันดาน, RTGS: Suep Sandan, pronounced [sɯ̀ːp sǎn.dāːn], lit "derive" (Note: The title is translated literally. However, it can also be translated as "bad succession.")) is a 2024 Thai television series aired on Netflix for seven episodes in genres of crime, suspense and melodrama. It is produced by Kantana Motion Pictures.

== Plot ==
The story of the powerful billionaire family, Thevasatitpaisarn. When Roongroj, a clan head mysteriously dies at the family's large mansion after announcing his maid, Kaimook as a new legal wife.

Even though each family member disagreed, they could not object. After Roongroj died, they harassed and abused the maids and servants. Kaimook believes her husband was murdered by a family member, or the maids and servants. So, she searches for evidence to expose his murderer.

== Cast ==
=== Starring ===
- Narilya Gulmongkolpech as Kaimook
- Teerapong Leowrakwong as Roongroj
- Chartayodom Hiranyasthiti as Phupat
- Nusba Punnakanta as Padcha
- Thanavate Siriwattanakul as Mavin
- Claudia Chakrabandhu na Ayudhya as Araya
- Narupornkamol Chaisang as Kita
- Thitinan Rattanathitinan as Shutter
- Latthgarmon Pinrojnkeerathi as Bee
- Nuttanan Kunpat as Kaew
- Tassawan Saeneewong as Yupin
- Kittisak Patomburana as Joke
- Natthakorn Traikitsyavet as Tian

=== Guest Starring ===
- Surapol Poonpiriya as Krit
- Aumara Singhathat as Tan
- Pornchanok Sintanaporn as Fai
- Murad Yapici as Carlos
- Warut Brown as Young Roongroj
- Sompob Benjapikul as Chaiwat
- Premmanat Suwannanon as Pachara
- Bhurith Ploymeeka as Phetye
- Kwankao Svetavimala as Pang
- Pimdao Panichsamai as Dao
- Phadtranit Vejjajiva as Amy
- Nanpaparth Pinrojnkeerathi as Bam
- Artisha Tanatirayut as Abel
- Pasakorn Vanasirikul as Dom

=== Co-Starring ===
- Sutpatorn Masamran as Mesa
- Kanyarat Leepongkul as Fah
- Rattanaporn Jonsatoen as Noon
- Kamonchanok Dangchowna as Mild
- Mayphitcha Sawatdee as Maple
- Phassorn Kongpaisansin as Ploy
- Sutudsa Jitkaewmanee as Sofia
- Luis Magdalena Nava as Executive Chef
- Klidsada Tunkkitiwonk as Head Chef
- Pakin Pumsawai as Station Chef
- Tanawat Pattanapiyawach as Station Chef
- Thitiwass Petcharat as Driver
- Supalerk Phaetwong as Driver
- Wichupas Sri-umphai as Driver
- Akin Natjiraphat as Driver
- Suvimol Jihan as Roongroj's Ex-Wife
- Arunothai Pueakpongsuriya as Security Guard
- Supakorn Jantawee as News Reporter
- Thanapong Khawmahit as MC Funeral
- Pongsawas Chayatawat as Guests Funeral
- Pathompol Ritthong as Guests Funeral
- Jira Yangyeun as Guests Funeral
- Jittipat Sakunkhroo as Procurer
- Linlada Kongsen as Theva Gems Receptionists
- Kaewkalaya Channarongkiat as Theva Gems Receptionists
- Parlika Mongkolliewrungfa as Theva Gems Receptionists
- Sukanda Jamlek as Theva Gems Receptionists
- Suthinaree Sripamorn as Mavin's Secretary
- Pongsapak Sittinawawit as Assistant Designer
- Kitiphat Sriprasert as Racecourse Staff
- Terawada Waroonsirin as Messenger
- Peechavit Pettanagul as MC Theva Charity
- Wacharin Anantapong as Guests Theva Charity
- Sasi Posayajinda as Guests Theva Charity
- Somjai Jungsookprasert as Guests Theva Charity
- Poolsanisagan Sati as Guests Theva Charity
- Napath Kanistakul as Guests Theva Charity
- Mookkakrit Luangaramrat as Doctor
- Sutha Suntornsujarit as Hospital Director
- Thira Pramejindakamon as Police Officer
- Boonsong Koetdat as Police Officer
- Nanthawat Tantrithanathorn as Police Officer
- Peeradaj Rangsamran as Police Officer
- Phermsit Boonprasert as Rescue Team
- Tanaporn Srinakorn as Rescue Team
- Nichakant Srichooros as Interviewee
- Praiya Denmontra as Interviewee
- Natthida Sujimongkhon as Interviewee
- Vasita Chaiananchot as Interviewee
- Nudtakarn Ronnakitti as Casting Director
- Panithida Boonla-or as Kita's Friends
- Victoria Mac as Kita's Friends
- Marut Mensah as Robber
- Bradley M Hayes as Robber
- Pahsin Shatvorranun as Body Double Roongroj
- Nuengruethai Dinprasertsat as Body Double Kaimook
- Natvipha Booncharoen as Body Double Padcha
- Teeradech Tisanuruk as Body Double Phupat
- Wishanun Ngerntong as Body Double Phupat
- Sarunpong Pornpasilp as Body Double Mavin
- Nuchwara Sukontakajorn as Body Double Dao
- Sutthiphong Payaksan as Stunt Double Phupat
- Suphachok Taweechote as Stunt Double Mavin
- Kittitat Kitsawat as Stunt Double Mavin
- Karunyapas Thawilarpthanakhom as Stunt Double Joke

== Episodes ==
No.	Title	Original release date
1	"The Last Supper" (อาหารมื้อสุดท้าย)	July 18, 2024
2	"The Offer" (ข้อเสนอ)	July 18, 2024
3	"Achilles Heel" (จุดอ่อน)	July 18, 2024
4	"Death End" (มืดแปดด้าน)	July 18, 2024
5	"Retribution" (คิดบัญชี)	July 18, 2024
6	"Rebellion" (ขบถ)	July 18, 2024
7	"Master of the House" (เจ้านาย)	July 18, 2024

== Critical reception ==
The director Sivaroj Kongsakul said "The core theme of this series revolves around our ability to manage power and greed, and whether our pursuits might inadvertently harm others. If left unchecked, it can wreck relationships, families, societies, or even entire nations," he explains. "How can we control these impulses? Are we aware of the pain we might inflict in our quest for success? This aspect makes the show both entertaining and compelling, prompting viewers to reflect on these issues."

Master of the House is the television series that serves dramatic scenes for the audience. The series vividly portrays drama in the distinctive style of Thai soap operas, or "lakorn," enhanced by premium production quality and intense on-screen confrontations between rising stars and veteran performers. It reflects a thrilling exploration of human ambition and the extremes people will go to fulfill their desires, and also invites viewers to reflect on the use of power and greed in their own lives.

As soon as it is released, it rose to the no.1 television category in Thailand and the no.1 most viewed non-English language television content in over eight countries including Qatar, Bahamas, Dominican Republic, Poland, Venezuela, Romania, Kenya, Malaysia and Thailand. It is the second most watched Netflix series in the world on July 22, 2024, behind only Cobra Kai. As of July 31, 2024, it topped Netflix's international series chart, was no.1 in 10 additional countries, and was in the top 10 in 63 additional countries worldwide.

As for criticism, there are many different kinds, the journalist Pravit Rojanaphruk posted on his X that "Trampling the poor, class discrimination, brothers kill each other over inheritance. Murder and no responsibility or flee to another country or this is true Thai soft power?". Communication Arts academic Warat Karuchit posted in conclusion "Personally, I don't support movies, dramas, and series that are divided between black and white. Reinforcing the discourse of rich people are bad, poor people are good, romanticizing the issue of class to the point of exaggeration. This creates a biased image that creates division between classes. It is easy to produce but does not help society develop forward."

Sakun Bunyathat, a writer and performing arts academic analyzed the reasons for its popularity "It is a series that is popular overseas, its content is a detective story, keeping the viewer excited all the time, wanting to know who the murderer is. It shows the passions of the characters through the upper and lower classes, in particular, characters who are pretty maids will be favored more than others. On the other side, it is a mix of a soap opera with a serious and tragic story through strong emotional performances by each perfermer. At the same time, there is a deep revenge plot for the characters, the characters representing the lower class try to use their potential to rise to the upper class, meanwhile, the upper classes tried to trample on the lower classes through a scene where Araya steps on Kaimook head who crawls and crouches in front of her like a tame dog. The role of the lower class character, even though they are allowed to be trampled on, have a feeling of wanting to fight and take revenge. The issue resonates with people in many countries around the world, including Thailand."

While unappreciative criticism includes Veerawat Aggutamanus of online media The Standard, said that Master of the House looks good with expensive and exotic camera angles, acting looks good. But it falling off a cliff because the script lacks enough depth and flat characters. As activist Leena Jungjanja harshly criticized, "A shitty series, it's fake, how could it be produced?, the content is too violent to accept and impossible in real life."

Film critic and analyst Jean from the YouTube channel Scoop Viewfinder said that it wasn't to his taste, and some of the characters' actions and the ending didn't make sense, so he only gave it a 5 out of 10 rating.

Some viewers, after watching, can't help but relate the characters' actions to real behaviors that occur among the children of high society in Thai society and Thai politics.

One of the cast who received praise for his role as a villain is Thanavate "Gap" Siriwattanakul, an actor and architect who portrays the role of Mavin. Himself as an actor who has played villainous roles in many films and television series, admit that "This is the bad role I have ever performed".

Google ranked the phrase Suep Sandan as the third most searched term by Thais in 2024 in the category of Thai drama television series.
