= Hello Stranger (2010 film) =

2010 Thai film by Banjong Pisanthanakun

- Theatrical release poster
- Directed by: Banjong Pisanthanakun
- Written by: Chantavit Dhanasevi; Nontra Kumwong; Banjong Pisanthanakun
- Produced by: Chenchonnee Soonthornsaratul; Suwimon Techasupinan; Pran Tadaveerawat; Jira Maligool; Vanridee Pongsittisak
- Starring: Chantavit Dhanasevi; Nuengthida Sophon
- Cinematography: Niramon Ross
- Edited by: Thammarat Sumetsupachok
- Music by: Chatchai Pongprapaphan; Krisanasak Kantatammawong
- Production company: Jorkwang Films
- Distributed by: GMM Tai Hub
- Release date: 19 August 2010
- Running time: 122 minutes
- Country: Thailand
- Languages: Thai; English; Korean
- Box office: $4,413,745

Hello Stranger (Thai: กวน มึน โฮ, RTGS: Kuan Muen Ho) is a 2010 Thai coming-of-age romance comedy film directed by Banjong Pisanthanakun, starring Chantavit Dhanasevi and Nuengthida Sophon, and distributed by GMM Tai Hub. It was Banjong's first romance film, which was inspired by the book Two Shadows in Korea (สองเงาในเกาหลี) by Songkalot Bangyikhun.

== Plots ==
A young man (Chantawit Dhanasevi), a man who wants to go to South Korea wearing flip flops and a baggy t-shirt and shorts. He is the only one in the tour group who does not have a family or lover with him. Perhaps the empty seat next to him is the reason he is so drunk on the day of departure after the plane's wheels touch down at Seoul Airport. The travel program according to the code 6-7-8 is wake up at 6 a.m., breakfast at 7 a.m., and wheels start at 8 a.m.

That night, the young man had to rely on Soju, and he passed out drunk in front of a guesthouse in a hotel bathrobe. The next morning, the young man suddenly got up and wasted his time on the wheel. The young woman (Nungthida Sophon) who was standing there was screaming because she wanted to get back the winter clothes that she had sacrificed for him to use to cover himself. The lost young man forced the young woman to take him to the hotel. But because he was lost and lost time, and got drunk and ruined his future, the young man missed the bus and missed the nerdy tour, so he had to follow the young woman who intended to go on a solo tour to explore the locations of a hit Korean series instead.

The young man could not help but wonder why the young woman traveled alone. She simply replied that she could travel alone without worrying about anyone. She could go wherever she wanted and did not have to argue with anyone. It could be because she was mischievous or because she was lonely and working hard. It was hard to guess. The young man suddenly made an offer: "Then let's travel together. If you don't like traveling with people you know, we don't have to know each other. We don't know each other's names or personal information." He smiled brightly and concluded, "We'll just be two strangers traveling together."

== Cast ==
- Chantavit Dhanasevi (Thai: ฉันทวิชช์ ธนะเสวี) as young man with the alias Dang (Thai: ด่าง)
- Nuengthida Sophon (Thai: หนึ่งธิดา โสภณ) as young woman with the alias May (Thai: เมย์)
- Warattaya Nilkuha (Thai: วรัทยา นิลคูหา) as Goi (Thai: ก้อย) (Dang's girlfriend) (cameo)
- Nattapong Chartpong (Thai: ณัฏฐพงษ์ ชาติพงศ์) as Dang's friend (cameo)
- MacKenzie Mills (Thai: Mack) as The Stranger
- Pongsatorn Jongwilak (Thai: พงศธร จงวิลาส) as Puek (Thai: เผือก) (Dang's friend) (cameo)
- Rossukon Kongket (Thai: รสสุคนธ์ กองเกตุ) as tour guide

== Production ==
=== Theme Songs ===
The song Nice Not to Know You was performed by 25 Hours. The song title is a play on the Thai introductory phrase from "Yin Dee Tee Dai Roo Juk," meaning "Nice to know you," to "Yin Dee Tee Mai Roo Juk", meaning "Nice not to know you." Its music video, directed by Nithiwat Tharathorn, stars the actors Chantavit and Nuengthida. Nuengthida also sang the theme song Love Doesn't Need Time (Thai: รักไม่ต้องการเวลา, Ruk Mai Tong Gan We La), originally by Klear (Thai: เคลียร์).

== Awards ==
Hello Stranger had its international premiere at 2011 (6th) Osaka Asian Film Festival in Osaka, Japan and won 2 awards from the festival including "Most Promising Talent Award" for the director, Banjong Pisanthanakun, and "ABC Award" or Asahi Broadcasting Corporation Award which is a sponsor award given to the most entertaining film in the Competition. Banjong and Chantavit represented all the casts & crews at the festival.

The film was also screened at 2011 Shanghai International Film Festival in Shanghai, China and the lead actor, Chantavit Dhanasevi, became one of the 10 actors to receive "Star Hunter Award".

== Reception ==
Hello Stranger was commercially successful. After its release on August 19, 2010, the film went on to gross ฿130 million in Thailand and became one of the most successful movies ever by GTH (at that time). The film was also screened in various Asian countries including Vietnam, Malaysia, Singapore, Indonesia, the Philippines, China, and Taiwan.
