= One Day (2016 film) =

2016 Thai film by Banjong Pisanthanakun

- Theatrical release poster
- Directed by: Banjong Pisanthanakun
- Written by: Banjong Pisanthanakun; Chantavit Dhanasevi; Nontra Koomwong
- Produced by: Jira Maligool; Chenchonnee Sunthornsaratul; Vanridee Pongsittisak; Suwimon Techasupinan; Weerachai Yaikwawong
- Starring: Chantavit Dhanasevi; Nittha Jirayungyurn
- Cinematography: Boonyanuch Kraithong
- Edited by: Chonlasit Upanigkit
- Music by: Vichaya Vatanasapt
- Production company: Jorkwang Films
- Distributed by: GDH 559
- Release dates: 1 September 2016 (Thailand); 27 October 2016 (Singapore); 28 October 2016 (Vietnam)
- Running time: 134 minutes
- Country: Thailand
- Language: Thai

One Day (Thai: แฟนเดย์ แฟนกันแค่วันเดียว, RTGS: Fanday...Fan Kun Khae Wan Diaw) is a 2016 Thai romance drama film directed by Banjong Pisanthanakun, and starring Chantavit Dhanasevi and Nittha Jirayungyurn.

In October 2016, Banjong was in Singapore to promote his new romantic drama together with the two leads, Chantavit and TV actress Nittha who is making her debut on the big screen. An Indian Hindi-language remake titled Ek Din was released on 1 May 2026.

== Synopsis ==
Denchai (Chantavit Dhanasevi) is in love with his colleague Nui (Nittha Jirayungyurn) but does not have the courage to express his feelings towards her. He finally gets his chance during the company trip. He makes a wish to be with Nui for just one day, and his wish comes true.

== Plot ==
The film follows Denchai, a socially awkward IT support technician who works at a large corporation in Bangkok. Quiet and habitually overlooked, Denchai is known simply as "the IT guy", summoned only when computers fail or Wi-Fi crashes. Invisible to most of his colleagues, he secretly nurtures feelings for Nui, a cheerful and warm marketing employee who is already involved in a complicated relationship with her charismatic, married superior.

When the company organizes a winter incentive trip to Hokkaido, Japan, Denchai joins with modest hopes of simply being near Nui outside the rigid hierarchy of office life. Amid snow-covered landscapes and group activities, Denchai remains on the margins—until a skiing accident changes everything. Nui crashes on the slopes and suffers temporary amnesia, losing her short-term memory. Doctors assure the group that her condition should resolve within a day.

Realizing that Nui does not remember who she is—or who anyone else is—Denchai makes an impulsive and morally fraught decision: he tells her that he is her boyfriend. To his astonishment, Nui accepts this explanation without question. For the first time, Denchai is not invisible. For one fleeting day, he becomes the person she smiles at, trusts, and leans on.

As they wander through Otaru's snowy streets, visit the canal, share hot chocolate, go ice skating, and ride a cable car overlooking the white expanse of Hokkaido, Denchai experiences the life he has only imagined. Freed from the emotional burdens of her past—including her unbalanced relationship back home—Nui appears lighter, candidly speaking about her exhaustion and longing for something simpler. Their conversations are intimate and sincere, and Denchai struggles between guilt over his deception and the overwhelming desire to preserve the fragile happiness of the moment.

The day culminates in a lantern-lit festival where they make wishes beneath the winter sky. In that suspended space between truth and illusion, they share a quiet kiss. For Denchai, the single day feels like an entire lifetime condensed into hours.

By morning, fragments of Nui's memory begin to return. She does not recall every detail, but she remembers the feelings—the warmth, the laughter, the sense of being truly seen. Gradually, reality reasserts itself. Denchai admits that he wanted to give her one perfect day, even if it was built on a lie. Though hurt and conflicted, Nui recognizes the sincerity behind his actions.

When the trip ends, they part at the station without dramatic promises. Back in Bangkok, life resumes its ordinary rhythm. Nui returns to her complicated relationship, and Denchai returns to his quiet corner of the office. Yet both are changed. The experience forces Nui to confront the emotional emptiness of her former life, while Denchai learns that love, even when fleeting and imperfect, can still hold profound meaning.

== Cast ==
- Chantavit Dhanasevi as Denchai
- Nittha Jirayungyurn as Nui

== Awards and nominations ==
Year	Award	Category	Nominated work	Result
2017	Dara Daily The Great Awards 2016	Best Actress in a Leading Film of 2016	Nittha Jirayungyurn	Won
2017	Dara Daily The Great Awards 2016	Best Actor in a Leading Film of 2016	Chantavit Dhanasevi	Won
2017	Dara Daily The Great Awards 2016	Best Movie	One Day	Won
2017	26th Thailand National Film Association Awards	Best Movie	One Day	Nominated
2017	26th Thailand National Film Association Awards	Best Actress	Nittha Jirayungyurn	Won
2017	26th Thailand National Film Association Awards	Best Actor	Chantavit Dhanasevi	Won
2017	26th Thailand National Film Association Awards	Best Director	Banjong Pisanthanakun	Nominated
2017	26th Thailand National Film Association Awards	Best Best Cinematography	Narupon Sohkkanapituk	Nominated
2017	26th Thailand National Film Association Awards	Best Film Editing	Chonlasit Upanigkit	Nominated
2017	26th Thailand National Film Association Awards	Best Recording and Sound Mixing	Kantana Sound Studio	Nominated
2017	26th Thailand National Film Association Awards	Best Original Music Score	Hua Lampong Riddim	Nominated
2017	26th Thailand National Film Association Awards	Best Makeup Effects	Benjawan Sroy-in	Nominated
2017	26th Thailand National Film Association Awards	Best Visual Effects	Yggdrazil Group Company Limited, Poster Company Limited	Nominated
2017	MThai Toptalk About	Top Talk – About Movie	One Day	Won
