= Chantavit Dhanasevi =

Thai actor and screenwriter (born 1983)

- ฉันทวิชช์ ธนะเสวี
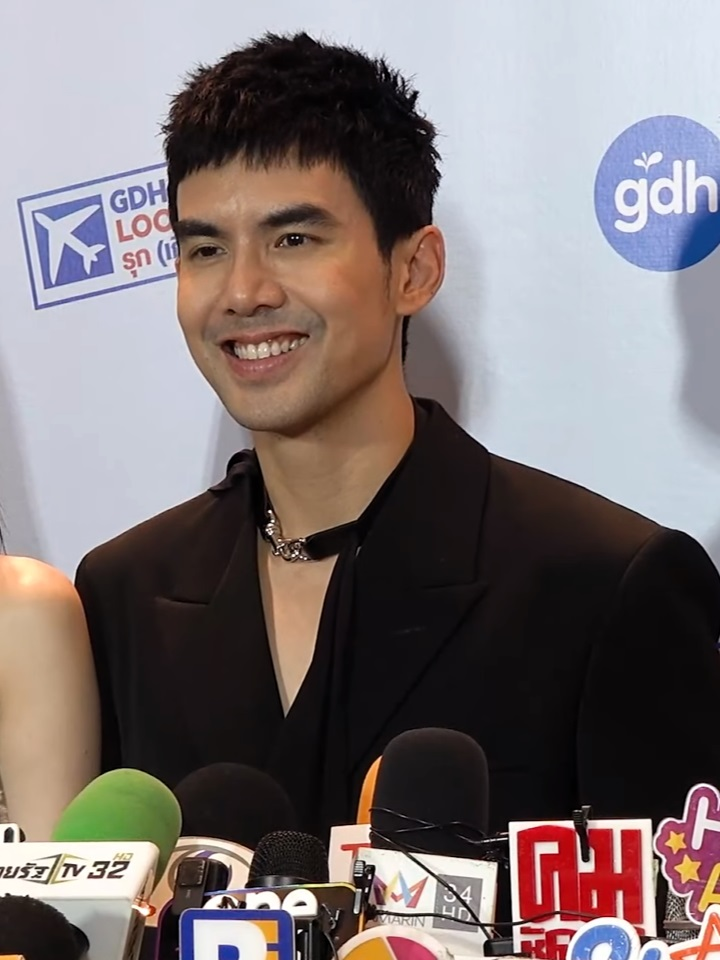
- Chantavit in 2025
- Born: Chantavit Dhanasevi; 18 September 1983 (age 43); Bangkok, Thailand
- Other names: Ter; Chunthawit Thanasewi
- Education: Chulalongkorn University (B.A. Communication Arts); University of Western Australia
- Occupations: Actor; screenwriter
- Years active: 2008–present
- Agents: GMM Tai Hub; GDH 559
- Height: 1.83 m (6 ft 0 in)
- Spouse: Davika Hoorne (m. 2025)

Chantavit Dhanasevi (Thai: ฉันทวิชช์ ธนะเสวี; RTGS: Chanthawit Thanasewi, born 18 September 1983), nicknamed Ter (Thai: เต๋อ) is a Thai actor and screenwriter. He is best known for his roles in the 2010 film Hello Stranger, the 2012 film ATM: Er Rak Error, and the 2016 movie, One Day.

== Early life ==
Dhanasevi studied at Chulalongkorn University and graduated with a bachelor's degree in Communication Arts, majoring in Motion Pictures and Still Photography. During his time at university, he worked in several faculty stage plays from 2001 to 2006.

== Career ==
After graduation, Dhanasevi began work as a freelancer and started doing screen-writing, assistant directing, off-shot cinematographing, and acting coach jobs for GTH. He acted in several small roles in many GTH films until 2008, when he got one of the main roles in Hormones. He then had another lead role in the horror film Coming Soon. He also was credited for screenwriting of 4Bia and Phobia 2 in 2008-2009.

In 2010, Dhanasevi became an actor after doing the romantic comedy Hello Stranger with Neungthida Sopon, in which he also was credited as co-screenwriter. His role earned him a Star Hunter award as one of the 10 most promising young actors in Asia at Shanghai International Film Festival 2011. In 2012, he came back with another film, ATM: Er Rak Error along with a new actress, Preechaya Pongthananikorn. ATM became GTH's highest-grossing film ever at that time (later surpassed by Pee Mak in 2013). In 2013, Dhanasevi co-wrote the film Pee Mak.

== Personal life ==
Dhanasevi was in a relationship with Pattarasaya Kreursuwansiri for nearly seven years.

In mid-2018, he began dating Davika Hoorne. On June 11, 2025, Chantavit proposed to Davika with a large diamond ring. They tied the knot at the boutique hotel Maison Mystique in Khao Yai, Thailand on November 10.

== Filmography ==
=== Screenwriter ===
Year	Title	Note
2008	4bia	Consultant writer / segment "In the Middle")
2008	Phobia 2	Screenplay / segment "In the End")
2010	Hello Stranger	Co-writer
2013	Pee Mak	Co-writer
2016	One Day	Co-writer
2021	The Medium	Co-writer

=== Film ===
Year	Title	Role
2007	The Bedside Detective	Pizza delivery guy
2008	Hormones	Hern
2008	Coming Soon	Shane
2010	Hello Stranger	Dang
2012	ATM: Er Rak Error	Sua
2016	One Day	Denchai
2017	A Gift	Llong
2019	The Con-Heartist	Mr. Samson
2024	404 Run Run	Nakrob

=== Television ===
- 2014 Naruk (XACT-SCENARIO/Ch.5) as Nai With Kaneungnij Jaksamittanon
- 2015 Phu Khong Yod Rak (TV Thunder/Ch.3) as Phan Namsupan With Rasri Balenciaga Chirathiwat
- 2017 Chai Mai Jing Ying Tae (The One Enterprise Public/One 31) as Phakorn Sedthahiran (Phak) With Davika Hoorne
- 2017 Nang Sao Mai Jam Kad Nam Sakul (The One Enterprise Public/One 31) as Aong Sa () With Davika Hoorne
- 2019 Rak Jung Oei (Mahaniyonchomchab/Ch.3) as Damrong (Phoo Yai Dam) With Natapohn Tameeruks
- 2020 Pleng Rak Chao Phraya (The One Enterprise Public-Por Dee kam/One 31) as Ton Jaopraya () With Alisa Kunkwaeng
- 2021 Help Me Khun Pee Chuay Duay (TV SCENE/Ch.3) as Arnon Srimankongying (Non) With Kannarun Wongkajornklai / Diana Flipo
- 2023 Mue Prap Kratha Rua (BEC Studio/Ch.3) as Jarinporn Joonkiat
- 2024 Doctor Climax as Dr. Nat

=== Series ===
- 2009 Sai Lub The Series (/Modernine) as Shu
- 2010 Muad Opas Yod Mue Prab...Ka Dee Pissawong (/Modernine) as Muad Opas
- 2011 Muad Opas The Series - Season 2 (/Modernine) as Muad Opas
- 2013 ATM 2: Koo Ver Er Rak (/) as
- 2016 Diary of Tootsie (/GDH559) as Escort - cameo
- 2020 The Con-Heartist (/GDH559) as Sam

=== Sitcom ===
- 2009 Suek Wan Shu Jai (/Ch.7) as Shu

=== Director ===
Year	Title	Episode
2015	ThirTEEN Terrors	Tai-Tam
2025	Clairebell	

=== Stage play ===
- 2012 Lum-Sing Singer as Paladkick (with Khemanit Jamikorn)

== Awards and nominations ==
Year	Award	Category	Nominated work	Result
2011	Suphannahong National Film Awards	Best Screenplay (shared with Banjong Pisanthanakun & Nontra Kumwong	Hello Stranger	Nominated
2011	Shanghai International Film Festival China ประจำปี 2011	Star Hunter Award	Hello Stranger	Won
2011	Meckhala Awards 24	Best Comedy Actor	Muad Opas Yod Mue Prab...Kadee Pissawong	Won
2012	Top Awards 2012	Best Film Actor	ATM: Er Rak Error	Won
2012	TV Pool Star Party Awards 2012	Film-goers' Most Favourite Star 2012	—N/a	Won
2014	Suphannahong National Film Awards	Best Screenplay (shared with Nontra Kumwong and Banjung Pisanthanakun	Pee Mak	Nominated
2016	Suphannahong National Film Awards	Best Actor	One Day	Won
2016	10th Nine Entertain Awards	Actor of the Year	One Day	Won
2016	14th Star Pics Awards	Best Leading Actor	One Day	Nominated
2016	Dara Daily The Great Awards	Actor of the Year	One Day	Won
2016	25th Entertainment Club Awards	Best Leading Actor	One Day	Nominated
2017	Kazz Awards	Best Actor	One Day	Won
2017	The BK Film Awards	Best Leading Actor	One Day	Won
