= Suddenly Twenty =

2016 Thai film

Suddenly Twenty (Note: Thai: 20 ใหม่ ยูเทิร์นวัย หัวใจรีเทิร์น) is a 2016 Thai musical comedy-drama film directed by Araya Suriharn. It is a remake of the 2014 South Korean film Miss Granny and stars Davika Hoorne in leading role

== Plot ==
A septuagenarian woman magically reverts to her 20-year-old self and is invited to join a band.

== Cast ==
- Davika Hoorne
- Krissanapoom Pibulsonggram
- Neeranuch Pattamasoot
- Rong Kaomulkadee
- War Jirawat Vachirasarunpatra
- Saharat Sangkapricha
- Sumontha Suanpholaat
- Suttatip Wutchaipradit

== Festival screenings ==
The film has been featured at the Osaka Asian Film Festival in Japan, the Luang Prabang Film Festival in Laos, the Thai Film Festival in China, and the Namaste Thailand Film Festival in India. It received five nominations at the 2017 Suphannahong National Film Awards.
