= Pee Mak =

2013 Thai film by Banjong Pisanthanakun

- Theatrical release poster
- Directed by: Banjong Pisanthanakun
- Written by: Nontra Khumvong; Banjong Pisanthanakun; Chantavit Dhanasevi
- Produced by: Jira Maligool; Chenchonnee Suntonsaratoon; Suwimon Techasupinun; Pran Thadaweerawutar; Vanridee Pongsittisak
- Starring: Mario Maurer; Davika Hoorne; Pongsathorn Jongwilas; Nattapong Chartpong; Auttarut Kongrasri; Kantapat Permpoonpatcharasook
- Cinematography: Narupon Sohkkanapituk
- Edited by: Tummarut Sumetsuppasok
- Music by: Chatchai Pongpraphaphan; Hualampong Riddim
- Production companies: GMM Tai Hub; Jorkwang Films
- Distributed by: GMM Tai Hub
- Release date: 28 March 2013
- Running time: 115 minutes
- Country: Thailand
- Language: Thai
- Budget: $1.8 million
- Box office: $20.9 million

Pee Mak (Thai: พี่มาก..พระโขนง; RTGS: Phi Mak Phra Khanong) is a 2013 Thai supernatural horror comedy romance film directed and co-written by Banjong Pisanthanakun. The story is an adaptation of the Mae Nak Phra Khanong legend of Thai folklore. The film stars Mario Maurer as Mak, Davika Hoorne as Nak, and Pongsathorn Jongwilas, Nattapong Chartpong, Auttarut Kongrasri and Kantapat Permpoonpatcharasook. The film was a major commercial success upon its release and became Thailand's highest-grossing film of all time.

== Plot ==
During the reign of King Mongkut, Mak is drafted to serve in the war, forcing him to leave his pregnant wife, Nak, in the town of Phra Khanong. While recovering from battle injuries, he befriends fellow soldiers Ter, Puak, Shin, and Aey. Meanwhile, Nak endures a difficult labor alone. She calls for help, but is too weak to be heard. Soon after, rumors spread in the village that Nak died during childbirth and has returned as a powerful ghost haunting her home. Terrified neighbors claim to hear her singing lullabies to her baby at night.

When Mak and his friends return to Phra Khanong, they find the town eerily silent. That night, they arrive at Mak and Nak’s house, where Mak introduces Nak to them. As it is too late to travel further, the friends decide to stay. The next day at the market, they are shunned by fearful villagers who refuse to sell them goods and flee at the sight of Mak. A drunken villager tries to warn him but is silenced by her son. The friends discuss the rumors but dismiss them.

Shin, sent to fetch Mak, notices the house is in disrepair after a stair breaks beneath him. He sees the baby’s cradle rocking on its own and witnesses Nak unnaturally extending her arm to retrieve a lime from beneath the house. When he tells the others, Ter accuses him of imagining things. Later, while relieving himself in the forest, Ter discovers a decomposed corpse behind the house wearing the same ring as Nak. The drunk villager who tried to warn them earlier mysteriously drowns.

That evening, Mak invites his friends to supper, where Nak serves them leaves and worms. They later play charades, during which a clue involves the word “Phi Sua” (“butterfly”), requiring Nak to be described as a ghost (“phi”). Mak angrily dismisses their warnings, ends their friendship, and forces them to leave.

Later, Mak and Nak go on a date in town, visiting an amusement park. At the Ferris wheel, his friends try to convince him Nak is a ghost, but Nak scares everyone away. They try again in a haunted house attraction and manage to drag Mak into the forest. When Mak’s wartime wound reopens, Shin and Ter suspect he, not Nak, is the ghost, especially when he cries out in pain after being struck with holy rice. They flee, taking Nak with them, as Puak covets her beauty.

While escaping by boat, Mak wades into the river toward them but nearly drowns when cramps seize him, proving he is not a ghost. Once rescued, he explains the holy rice had irritated his wound. In the confusion, Aey drops a ring identical to those worn by Mak, Nak, and the corpse. The others accuse Aey of being a ghost and throw him off the boat. With no paddles, they are stranded until Nak produces a soaking wet one. Ter realizes they had drifted too far for a normal person to recover it. When he glances between his legs, Nak’s ghostly form is revealed, her arm extended to rest on Mak’s shoulder.

The men flee to a temple, where a monk protects them with holy rice, water, and a magic “safety ring.” Nak appears in her terrifying form and attacks. The holy items hold her back, but in the chaos, and as Mak struggles to stay with her, they are all wasted. The monk is accidentally knocked out of the ring and flees, leaving the group defenseless. A pale Aey reappears, revealing he is human; he had stolen the corpse’s ring to fund his gambling. Nak pleads that she only wants to be with Mak, denying responsibility for the drunk villager’s death, claiming the woman drowned herself.

Nak then threatens to kill Mak so they can be together, but stops when she sees how frightened he is. Mak reveals he has known the truth all along, having confirmed her ghostly form during the charades game and having already found her corpse. Despite this, he says he fears life without her more than her being dead. They tearfully reconcile, and the friends reaffirm their bond, vowing never to part again. A flashback shows Mak and Nak’s first meeting.

In the credits, Mak, Nak, and their friends live happily in the village. Nak uses her supernatural powers for household chores, games of charades (helping Mak win for the first time), scaring off hostile villagers (led by the drunk’s son), and running the town’s haunted house attraction. It is also revealed that their infant son, Dang, has inherited some of her abilities.

== Cast ==
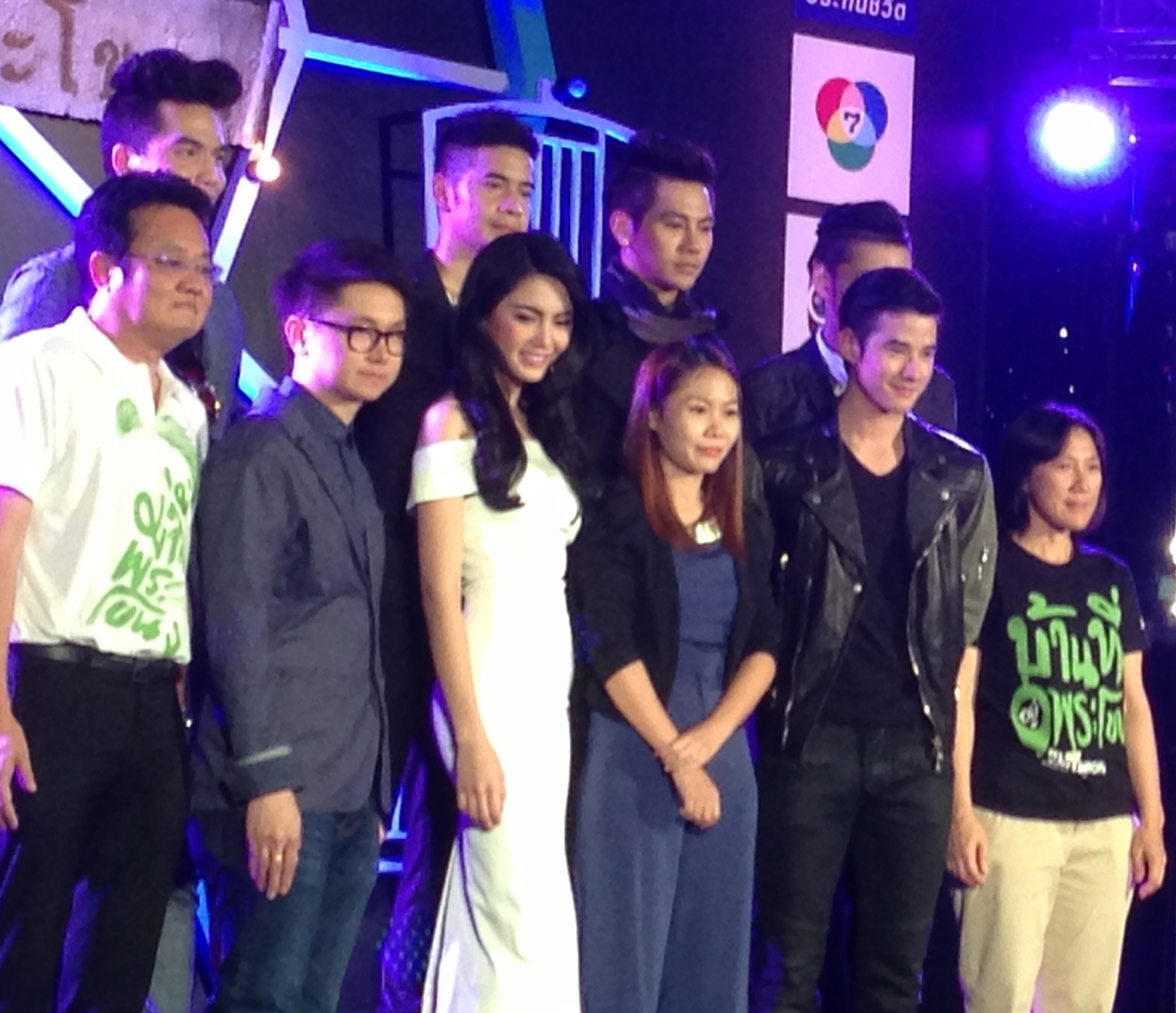
Press conference of Peemak.

- Mario Maurer as Mak
- Davika Hoorne as Nak
- Kantapat Permpoonpatcharasuk as Aey (เอ, RTGS: E)
- Nuttapong Chartpong as Ter (เต๋อ, RTGS: Toe)
- Wiwat Kongrasri as Shin (ชิน, RTGS: Chin)
- Pongsathorn Jongwilas as Puak (เผือก, RTGS: Phueak)

== Reception ==
Pee Mak earned more than 1 billion baht ($33 million) in revenue worldwide (mostly in Asia), and became the highest-grossing Thai film of all time, more than tripling the record held by The Legend of Suriyothai. The film sold a record 16 million tickets worldwide. The film also screened in Indonesia, Hong Kong, Cambodia, Malaysia, Taiwan, Singapore, Myanmar, Brunei and Japan. In Hong Kong, it earned over $10 million HKD over a time span of over 40 days. It is the first Thai film to be screened in every Southeast Asian country. It was also screened at the East Wind Film Festival in England.

The film received generally positive critical reviews, with a positive review in The Nation and The Guardian seeing it as a major success for Thai cinema.

== Accolades ==
Year	Award	Category	Nominated work	Result
2013	24th Star Party TV Pool Awards	Teen Idol Actress Award	Davika Hoorne	Won
2013	6th Siam Dara Star Awards	Best Movie	Pee Mak	Nominated
2013	6th Siam Dara Star Awards	Best Movie Director	Banjong Pisanthanakun	Nominated
2013	6th Siam Dara Star Awards	Actress Excellent	Davika Hoorne	Won
2013	6th Siam Dara Star Awards	Most Popular Female Star	Davika Hoorne	Nominated
2013	6th Siam Dara Star Awards	Actor Excellent	Mario Maurer	Won
2013	6th Siam Dara Star Awards	Most Popular Male Star	Mario Maurer	Nominated
2013	6th Siam Dara Star Awards	Scene Stealer Award	Kantapat Permpoonpatcharasuk, Nattapong Chartpong, Wiwat Kongrasri & Pongsatorn Jongwilak	Won
2013	11th Seventeen Choice Awards	Hot Guys of the Year	Mario Maurer	Won
2013	11th Seventeen Choice Awards	Hot Girl of the Year	Davika Hoorne	Won
2013	56th Asia-Pacific Film Festival	Best Art Director	Arkadech Kaewkotara	Nominated
2013	OK! Awards	Spotlight Award	Pee Mak	Won
2013	2nd Kerd Awards	Born to be Famous Award	Davika Hoorne	Nominated
2013	2nd Kerd Awards	Born to be the Best	Davika Hoorne	Won
2013	2nd Kerd Awards	Born to be Together Award	Mario Maurer & Davika Hoorne	Nominated
2013	2nd Kerd Awards	Born to be a Comedian Award	Kantapat Permpoonpatcharasuk, Nattapong Chartpong, Wiwat Kongrasri & Pongsatorn Jongwilak	Won
2013	2nd Kerd Awards	Kerd of the Year	Mario Maurer	Won
2013	11th Starpics Thai Films Awards	Best Movie	Pee Mak	Nominated
2013	11th Starpics Thai Films Awards	Best Movie Director	Banjong Pisanthanakun	Nominated
2013	11th Starpics Thai Films Awards	Best Actor	Mario Maurer	Nominated
2013	11th Starpics Thai Films Awards	Best Supporting Actor	Pongsatorn Jongwilak	Nominated
2013	11th Starpics Thai Films Awards	Best Screenplay	Nontra Kumwong, Banjong Pisanthanakun, Chantavit Dhanasevi	Nominated
2013	11th Starpics Thai Films Awards	Best Movie Editing	Tummarut Sumetsuppasok	Nominated
2013	11th Starpics Thai Films Awards	Best Art Director	Arkadech Kaewkotara	Nominated
2013	11th Starpics Thai Films Awards	Best Original Music Score	Chatchai Pongpraphaphan, Hua Lampong Riddim	Nominated
2013	11th Starpics Thai Films Awards	Popular Movie	Pee Mak	Won
2014	23rd Thailand National Film Association Awards	Best Film	Pee Mak	Nominated
2014	23rd Thailand National Film Association Awards	Best Director	Banjong Pisanthanakun	Nominated
2014	23rd Thailand National Film Association Awards	Best Actress	Davika Hoorne	Nominated
2014	23rd Thailand National Film Association Awards	Best Supporting Actor	Pongsatorn Jongwilak	Nominated
2014	23rd Thailand National Film Association Awards	Best Supporting Actor	Wiwat Kongrasri	Nominated
2014	23rd Thailand National Film Association Awards	Best Supporting Actor	Nattapong Chartpong	Nominated
2014	23rd Thailand National Film Association Awards	Best Screenplay	Nontra Kumwong, Banjong Pisanthanakun, Chantavit Dhanasevi	Nominated
2014	23rd Thailand National Film Association Awards	Best Cinematography	Narupon Sohkkanapituk	Nominated
2014	23rd Thailand National Film Association Awards	Best Film Editing	Tummarut Sumetsuppasok	Nominated
2014	23rd Thailand National Film Association Awards	Best Original Music Score	Chatchai Pongpraphaphan, Hua Lampong Riddim	Nominated
2014	23rd Thailand National Film Association Awards	Best Recording and Sound Mixing	Kantana Sound Studio	Nominated
2014	23rd Thailand National Film Association Awards	Best Art Director	Arkadech Kaewkotara	Won
2014	23rd Thailand National Film Association Awards	Best Makeup Effects	Pichet Wongjansom	Nominated
2014	23rd Thailand National Film Association Awards	Best Costume Design	Suthee Muanwaja	Nominated
2014	23rd Thailand National Film Association Awards	Best Visual Effects	Oriental Post	Nominated
2014	4th Mthai Top Talk Awards	Top Talk About Movie	Pee Mak	Won
2014	22nd Bangkok Critics Assembly Awards	Best Movie	Pee Mak	Nominated
2014	22nd Bangkok Critics Assembly Awards	Best Movie Director	Banjong Pisanthanakun	Nominated
2014	22nd Bangkok Critics Assembly Awards	Best Actor	Mario Maurer	Nominated
2014	22nd Bangkok Critics Assembly Awards	Best Supporting Actor	Wiwat Kongrasri	Nominated
2014	22nd Bangkok Critics Assembly Awards	Best Screenplay	Nontra Kumwong, Banjong Pisanthanakun, Chantavit Dhanasevi	Nominated
2014	22nd Bangkok Critics Assembly Awards	Best Movie Editing	Tummarut Sumetsuppasok	Nominated
2014	22nd Bangkok Critics Assembly Awards	Best Cinematography	Narupon Sohkkanapituk	Nominated
2014	22nd Bangkok Critics Assembly Awards	Best Art Director	Arkadech Kaewkotara	Nominated
2014	22nd Bangkok Critics Assembly Awards	Best Original Music Score	Chatchai Pongpraphaphan, Hua Lampong Riddim	Won
2014	22nd Bangkok Critics Assembly Awards	Highest Grossing Movie of the Year	Pee Mak	Won
2014	The Nine Fever Awards	Thai Movie Fever	Pee Mak	Won
2014	The BK Film Awards	Best Actress in Leading Role	Davika Hoorne	Won
2014	The BK Film Awards	Best Actor in Supporting Role	Kantapat Permpoonpatcharasuk, Nattapong Chartpong, Wiwat Kongrasri & Pongsatorn Jongwilak	Won
2014	11th Kom Chad Luek Awards	Best Supporting Actor	Pongsatorn Jongwilak	Nominated
2014	11th Kom Chad Luek Awards	Best Movie Director	Banjong Pisanthanakun	Nominated
2014	11th Kom Chad Luek Awards	Popular Movie Award	Pee Mak	Nominated
2014	4th Thai Film Director Association	Excellent Movie	Pee Mak	Won
2014	4th Thai Film Director Association	Excellent Director	Banjong Pisanthanakun	Won
2014	8th Kazz Awards	Movie of the Year	Pee Mak	Won
2014	8th Kazz Awards	Popular Actor Award	Mario Maurer	Nominated
2014	8th Kazz Awards	Superstar Man of the Year	Mario Maurer	Nominated
2014	8th Kazz Awards	Popular Actress Award	Davika Hoorne	Nominated
2014	8th Kazz Awards	Superstar Woman of the Year	Davika Hoorne	Nominated
2014	7th Nine Entertain Awards	Film of the Year	Pee Mak	Nominated
2014	7th Nine Entertain Awards	Actor of the Year	Mario Maurer	Won
2014	7th Nine Entertain Awards	Creative Team of the Year - The Screenplay	Nontra Kumwong, Banjong Pisanthanakun, Chantavit Dhanasevi	Nominated
2014	7th Nine Entertain Awards	Creative Team of the Year - The Art Director	Arkadech Kaewkotara	Nominated
2014	3rd Daradaily The Great Awards	Movie of the Year	Pee Mak	Won
2014	3rd Daradaily The Great Awards	Best Film Actor of the Year	Mario Maurer	Won
2014	3rd Daradaily The Great Awards	Best Film Actress of the Year	Davika Hoorne	Won
2015	2nd ASEAN International Film Festival and Awards	Special Jury Award	Pee Mak	Won

== Remake ==
An Indonesian remake titled Kang Mak from Pee Mak, directed by Herwin Novianto was released in August 15, 2024 in Indonesia.

A Philippine remake, originally titled Mak-Mak but changed to the same title of the original film, was produced by Viva Films. It was released in 2026.

== See also ==
- List of ghost films
- Bayama Irukku
- Kinavalli
