= Namaste Thailand Film Festival =

Annual film festival in Delhi, India

The Namaste Thailand Film Festival is an annual Delhi-based film festival that promotes Thai culture in India through contemporary movies with free screenings. In 2021, it used an online platform.

== See also ==
- India–Thailand relations
