= Cuando sea joven =

- Theatrical release poster
- Directed by: Raúl Martínez
- Written by: Juan Carlos Garzón; Angélica Gudiño
- Based on: Miss Granny (2014) by Shin Dong-ik, Hong Yun-jeong and Dong Hee-seon
- Produced by: Eugenio Derbez; Ben Odell
- Starring: Verónica Castro; Natasha Dupeyrón; Michael Ronda; Eduardo Santamarina
- Cinematography: Alejandro Martínez
- Edited by: Eugenio Richer
- Music by: Carlo Siliotto
- Production companies: GlobalGate Entertainment; 3Pas Studios
- Distributed by: Videocine; Pantelion Films
- Release date: September 15, 2022 (Mexico)
- Running time: 120 minutes
- Country: Mexico
- Language: Spanish
- Budget: $2 million

Cuando sea joven (Note: Spanish: When I am young) is a 2022 Mexican musical comedy-drama film directed by Raúl Martínez. It is a remake of the 2014 South Korean film Miss Granny and stars Natasha Dupeyrón.

== Plot ==
A senior lady undergoes a magical transformation and becomes her youthful 20-year-old self once again.

== Cast ==
- Verónica Castro as Malena
  - Natasha Dupeyrón as Malena de joven
- Michael Ronda
- Édgar Vivar
- Eduardo Santamarina
- Pierre Louis
- Alejandra Barros
- Maribel Fernández
- Manuel "Flaco" Ibáñez

== Reception ==
Avi Offer of NYC Movie Guru gave the film a positive feedback and wrote, "Sweet, funny and tender with just the right balance of humor and heart." The film was rated B+ by Lupe Rodriguez Haas of CineMovie.tv and she said "The comedy is a wholesome good time for the entire family, especially for your abuelitas. The swapping lives plot has been done to death but this one brings a few twists and lots of charm."

Sandie Angulo Chen from Common Sense Media gave the film a rating of 4 out of 5 and she wrote "Although the swapped-bodies storyline has been done dozens of times across the decades, this addition manages to avoid complete predictability, especially once it seems like Maria is in no rush to "return" to her older body."
