= Banjong Pisanthanakun =

Thai filmmaker and screenwriter (born 1979)

- บรรจง ปิสัญธนะกูล
- Banjong in 2026
- Born: 11 September 1979 (age 47); Bang Phli, Samut Prakan, Thailand
- Education: Chulalongkorn University
- Occupations: Film director; screenwriter
- Notable work: Shutter (2004); Alone (2007); Pee Mak (2013); The Medium (2021)

Bangjong Pisanthanakun (Thai: บรรจง ปิสัญธนะกูล) is a Thai filmmaker and screenwriter. He saw early success with his first two films, Shutter (2004) and Alone (2007), both horror films that he co-directed and co-wrote with Parkpoom Wongpoom. He also directed the 2013 comedy-horror romance film Pee Mak, which became Thailand's highest-grossing film of all time, and the 2021 horror film The Medium, which was a commercial and critical success in South Korea. In addition to horror films, Bangjong directed the romance films Hello Stranger (2010) and One Day (2016).

== Education and early career ==
Bangjong Pisanthankun graduated in 1999 from Chulalongkorn University in Bangkok, where he majored in film.

He directed a short film, Plae Kao, which was a finalist for best picture and best screenplay in the Click Radio comedy short film competition in 2000.

He then wrote and directed Colorblind, a short film that has been screened at the Thai Short Film and Video Festival, the Asian Film Symposium, Raindance, Asiexpo in Lyon, France, Toronto Reel Asian, Puchon International Fantastic Film Festival and the San Francisco International Asian American Film Festival.

He has worked as a film critic for Starpics, a popular Thai film entertainment magazine, as well as an assistant director for television commercials.

== Feature films ==
Bangjong's first feature film, Shutter, with a story about ghost images in photographs and a haunted photographer (portrayed by Ananda Everingham), was the biggest box-office hit in Thailand that year, and also a hit in Singapore, Malaysia, the Philippines and Brazil. Shutter has since been remade in three other languages, including the 2008 Hollywood film Shutter.

The two teamed up again in 2007 for Alone, which also was a box-office hit and played at many film festivals, including the 2007 Bangkok International Film Festival, where it was in competition for Best ASEAN Film. Alone has been remade in two other languages.

Bangjong's 2013 film Pee Mak became Thailand's highest grossing film of all time, and was the first Thai film to be screened in every Southeast Asian country.

In 2021, he directed The Medium, a co-production between Thailand and South Korea. It was a commercial success in South Korea and received generally positive critical reviews

In 2026, Banjong Pisanthanakun was announced as the director of the horror feature Inherit, his first film in five years. The project is produced by Thai studio GDH 559 and is adapted from the 1991 horror novel Tayat Asun. The film is set to star Davika Hoorne. South Korean company Barunson E&A, known for producing Parasite, boarded the project to handle international sales.

== Filmography ==
=== Feature films ===
- Shutter (2004)
- Alone (2007)
- 4bia (segment: "The Man In The Middle") (2008)
- Phobia 2 (segment: "In the End") (2009)
- Hello Stranger (2010)
- The ABCs of Death (segment: "N is for Nuptials") (2012)
- Pee Mak (2013)
- One Day (2016)
- The Medium (2021)

=== Short films ===
- Plao Kao (8 minutes, 2000)
- Colorblind (13 minutes, 2002)
