= Miss Granny =

- Promotional poster
- Hangul: 수상한 그녀
- Hanja: 殊常한 그女
- Lit.: Suspicious Girl
- RR: Susanghan geunyeo
- MR: Susanghan kŭnyŏ
- Directed by: Hwang Dong-hyuk
- Written by: Shin Dong-ik; Hong Yun-jeong; Dong Hee-seon
- Produced by: Jeon Jae-sun; Park Ji-seong; Lee Jae-pil; Im Ji-young
- Starring: Shim Eun-kyung; Na Moon-hee
- Cinematography: Kim Ji-yong
- Edited by: Nam Na-yeong
- Music by: Mowg
- Production company: Yein Plus
- Distributed by: CJ Entertainment
- Release date: January 22, 2014 (South Korea)
- Running time: 124 minutes
- Country: South Korea
- Language: Korean
- Budget: US$3.2 million
- Box office: US$51.7 million

Miss Granny (Korean: 수상한 그녀) is a 2014 South Korean fantasy comedy drama film directed by Hwang Dong-hyuk. Na Moon-hee stars as a woman in her 70s who magically finds herself in the body of her 20-year-old self (Shim Eun-kyung) after having her picture taken at a mysterious photo studio. After opening in theaters on January 22, 2014, it became a huge box office hit, with 8.65 million tickets sold.

== Plot ==
Oh Mal-soon, a 74-year-old widow, lives with her son and his family. Foul-mouthed, stubborn, controlling and shameless, she has a difficult relationship with her depressed daughter-in-law Ae-ja, but is very proud of her son Hyun-chul, who became a university professor of gerontology at Seoul National University and whom she raised by herself against all odds. One day, Ae-ja gets hospitalized after suddenly collapsing. Her doctors strongly advise her to live apart from Mal-soon. On the day she is told by her son that she is being sent to a nursing home, the dismayed Mal-soon wanders the streets and comes across a mysterious photo studio that claims it captures the moments of one's youth. She takes what she believes will be her last self-portrait for her not-so-far-off funeral, but when she comes out of the studio, Mal-soon is dumbfounded by her own reflection in the mirror: she's now a fresh, young 20-year-old woman.

At first not knowing what to do, she hides from her family and soon ends up lodging with her fellow café shop worker who used to be a servant of her family. With no one recognizing her, Mal-soon decides to make the most out of this once-in-a-lifetime opportunity. She renames herself Oh Doo-ri after her all-time favorite actress Audrey Hepburn, gets a haircut similar to Hepburn's in Roman Holiday, and takes advantage of her youth. As the "suspicious girl" of the Korean title, all anyone sees is that Doo-ri speaks with a regional accent and walks like an old lady, and that she acts very strangely and motherly for her age. After wowing a group of pensioners with a stirring karaoke tune one day, she attracts the notice of her unknowing grandson Ji-ha, a 4th year in university, and Han Seung-woo, a TV music producer. Ji-ha invites her to join his heavy metal band, and after she convinces them to switch to more audience-pleasing melodies.

She gets caught romantically between two men: Mr. Park, her now ex-café worker friend who had always secretly loved Mal-soon, and Seung-woo, who's doing his best to track her down again. Mr. Park's daughter forces her out as she thinks Doo-ri is scheming after his money and she takes refuge in Mr. Han's apartment.

Meanwhile, the band becomes successful with her as vocalist and Seung-woo decides to take them under his wing. Doo-ri is thrilled to be pursuing a career in music ― something she had to give up when she was young. They are booked for an extravaganza at the studio and Ji-ha is late due to a traffic jam. He decides to leave the taxi and bike but is hit by a lorry on the way there. He is in a critical condition at the hospital but Doo-ri decides to go on stage so as to tell him that his song was a success afterwards. As she arrives at the hospital it is found that only she has the correct blood type for a transfusion. She does the transfusion knowing that it would return her back to her aged condition.

Ji-ha's band takes off with the sister as the lead singer and Doo-ri as a fan. Mr. Park finds the same photo studio and becomes young and handsome. He picks her up at a bus stop and rides off bickering good naturedly as they always do.

== Cast ==
- Shim Eun-kyung as young Oh Mal-soon / Oh Doo-ri
  - Na Moon-hee as Oh Mal-soon
- Park In-hwan as Mr. Park
- Sung Dong-il as Ban Hyun-chul
- Lee Jin-wook as Han Seung-woo
- Hwang Jung-min as Ae-ja
- Kim Seul-gi as Ban Ha-na
- Jinyoung as Ban Ji-ha
- Kim Hyun-sook as Park Na-young
- Ha Yeon-joo as Soo-yeon
- Park Hye-jin as Ok-ja
- Jung In-gi as Hyun-chul's doctor friend
- Hong Seok-yeon as chemist
- Lee Jang-yu as shoe stall owner
- Park Hyung-woo as bassist of Ji-ha's band
- Lee Sang-eon as drummer of Ji-ha's band
- Park Seung-tae as Oh Bok
- Han Ji-eun as Seo Mi-ae
- Hwang Young-hee as Chinese restaurant owner
- Kim Seon-ha as princess in TV drama
- Kim Dong-hee as Dragon
- Kim Dong-seok as music show MC
- Pyo Ye-jin as music show MC
- Kim Soo-hyun as young Mr. Park (cameo)
- Hwang Seung-eon as female college student applying make-up (cameo)
- Jang Gwang as photographer (cameo)
- Choi Hwa-jung as radio DJ (cameo)
- Yoo Se-yoon as legendary band vocalist (cameo)

== Original soundtrack ==
Miss Granny OST
No.	Title	Artist	Length
1.	"나성에 가면" (If You Go to Los Angeles)	Shim Eun-kyung	2:56
2.	"반지하 인생" (Life of Half Underground)	Han Soo-yeon	3:26
3.	"하얀나비" (White Butterfly)	Shim Eun-kyung	3:39
4.	"한번 더" (Once More)	Shim Eun-kyung	4:05
5.	"Waltz for Mother"	Mowg	3:43

Raindrop (Miss Granny OST)
No.	Title	Artist	Length
1.	"빗물" (Raindrop)	Shim Eun-kyung	3:44
2.	"빗물 (Inst.)" (Raindrop (Inst.))		3:44

Miss Granny - If You Go to Los Angeles (Special Collaboration)
No.	Title	Artist	Length
1.	"나성에 가면" (If You Go to Los Angeles)	Rose Motel, Shim Eun-kyung	3:02

== Box office ==
Miss Granny was released in South Korea on January 22, 2014. It drew 850,000 admissions on its opening day, placing it second behind Hollywood animated film Frozen at the box office.

By its second week, good word of mouth caused ticket sales to rise 106%, and Miss Granny became the surprise chart topper after accruing 1.76 million viewers over the Lunar New Year weekend. After only 12 days in theaters, it reached close to 4 million admissions. Miss Granny crossed 7 million admissions on February 17 after 27 days on release, with a gross of ₩51.1 billion (US$48.1 million). To date, the film has had 8,656,417 admissions, earning ₩62.5 billion (US$61.8 million); it climbed to number 13 on the all-time Korean box office chart in its eighth week. Miss Granny grossed a total of US$59.6 million internationally.

== Academic analysis ==
The film challenges social norms by focusing on an elderly woman, inviting the audience to connect with her. Through a magical shift between old and young, the film suggests that while modern society offers women more opportunities for self-expression, they still struggle for true agency. This is due to a conflict between hyper-individualism and relational values, which hinders them from fully realizing themselves.

== Awards and nominations ==
Year	Award	Category	Recipient	Result	Ref.
2014	19th Chunsa Film Art Awards	Best Actress	Shim Eun-kyung	Won	
2014	19th Chunsa Film Art Awards	Best Screenplay	Shin Dong-ik, Hong Yun-jeong, Dong Hee-seon	Won	
2014	5th Okinawa International Movie Festival	Uminchu Prize Grand Prix, Peace category	Miss Granny	Won	
2014	50th Baeksang Arts Awards	Best Actress	Shim Eun-kyung	Won	
2014	50th Baeksang Arts Awards	Best Screenplay	Shin Dong-ik, Hong Yun-jeong, Dong Hee-seon	Nominated	
2014	18th Fantasia International Film Festival	Audience Award, Best Asian Film - Gold	Miss Granny	Won	
2014	14th Director's Cut Awards	Best Actress	Shim Eun-kyung	Won	
2014	23rd Buil Film Awards	Best Actress	Shim Eun-kyung	Won	
2014	23rd Buil Film Awards	Best Screenplay	Shin Dong-ik, Hong Yun-jeong, Dong Hee-seon	Nominated	
2014	23rd Buil Film Awards	Best Music	Mowg	Nominated	
2014	34th Korean Association of Film Critics Awards	Critics' Top 10	Miss Granny	Won	
2014	51st Grand Bell Awards	Best Actress	Shim Eun-kyung	Nominated	
2014	51st Grand Bell Awards	Best Screenplay	Shin Dong-ik, Hong Yun-jeong, Dong Hee-seon	Nominated	
2014	51st Grand Bell Awards	Best Music	Mowg	Won	
2014	15th Women in Film Korea Awards	Best Producer	Im Ji-young	Won	
2014	15th Women in Film Korea Awards	Best Marketing		Won	
2014	35th Blue Dragon Film Awards	Best Film	Miss Granny	Nominated	
2014	35th Blue Dragon Film Awards	Best Director	Hwang Dong-hyuk	Nominated	
2014	35th Blue Dragon Film Awards	Best Actress	Shim Eun-kyung	Nominated	
2014	35th Blue Dragon Film Awards	Best Screenplay	Shin Dong-ik, Hong Yun-jeong, Dong Hee-seon	Nominated	
2014	35th Blue Dragon Film Awards	Best Music	Mowg	Nominated	
2014	1st Korean Film Producers Association Awards	Best Actress	Shim Eun-kyung	Won	
2015	10th Max Movie Awards	Best Film	Miss Granny	Nominated	
2015	10th Max Movie Awards	Best Director	Hwang Dong-hyuk	Nominated	
2015	10th Max Movie Awards	Best Actress	Shim Eun-kyung	Nominated	
2015	10th Max Movie Awards	Best Supporting Actor	Jinyoung	Nominated	
2015	10th Max Movie Awards	Best Supporting Actress	Na Moon-hee	Won	
2015	10th Max Movie Awards	Best Supporting Actress	Shim Eun-kyung	Nominated	
2015	10th Max Movie Awards	Best Supporting Actress	Kim Seul-gi	Nominated	
2015	10th Max Movie Awards	Best Trailer	Miss Granny	Nominated	
2015	10th Max Movie Awards	Best Poster	Miss Granny	Nominated	

== Remakes ==
Miss Granny has received several remakes in different countries and languages.

=== Film ===
Year	English title	Country
2015	20 Once Again	China and Taiwan
2015	Sweet 20	Vietnam
2016	Sing My Life	Japan
2016	Suddenly Twenty	Thailand
2017	Sweet 20	Indonesia
2018	Miss Granny	Philippines
2019	Oh! Baby	India
2022	Cuando sea joven	Mexico
TBA	Ms. Granny	United States

=== Television ===
Year	English title	Country
2018	20 Once Again	China
2024	Who Is She	South Korea

== See also ==
- 13 Going on 30
- 17 Again
- Mr. Back
