= Rasri Balenciaga Chirathiwat =

Thai actress and model

Rasri Balenciaga Chirathivat
- ราศรี บาเล็นซิเอก้า จิราธิวัฒน์
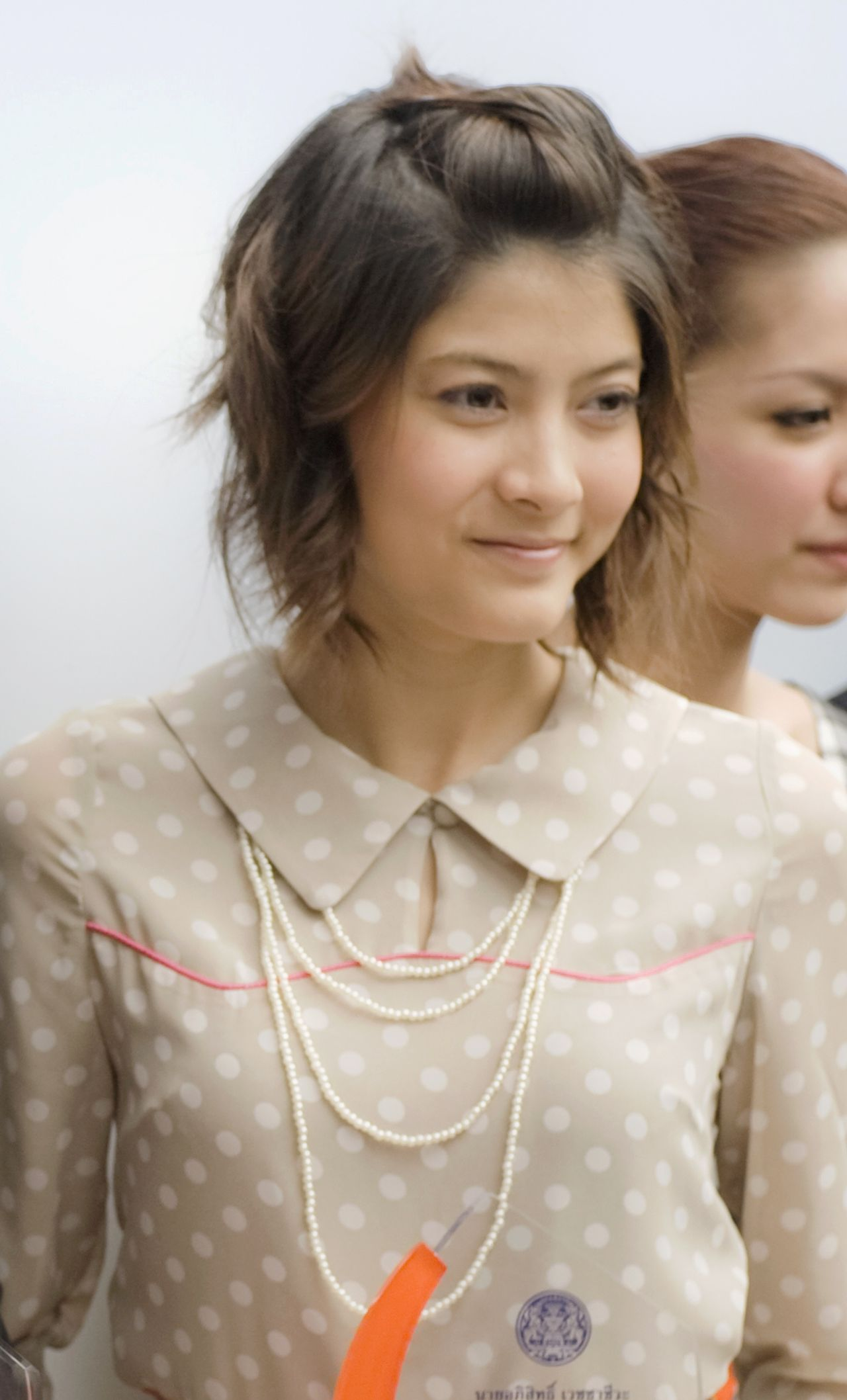
- Rasri at a government award ceremony in 2010
- Born: Rasri Balenciaga; August 22, 1990 (age 36); Bangkok, Thailand
- Other names: Margarita Balenciaga; Margie
- Occupations: Actress; model
- Years active: 2006–present
- Agent: Channel 3 (2006–present)
- Spouse: Patsarakorn Chirathivat (m. 2017)
- Children: 2
- Family: Sadanun Balenciaga (younger sister)

Rasri Balenciaga Chirathivat (Thai: ราศรี บาเล็นซิเอก้า จิราธิวัฒน์, RTGS: Rasi Balensi-eka Chirathiwat; born August 22, 1990), more commonly known as Margie, is a Thai actress and model, who first appeared in the lakorn called Kularb Tud Petch with Kittikun Sumridpansuk.

== Early life and education ==
Balenciaga was born to a Spanish father, Daniel Balenciaga, and a Thai Chinese mother, Orasri Balenciaga Honnold, who is a former model. She has one sister, Sadanun Balenciaga (nicknamed Marina), who is also a Thai actress. Balenciaga went to Wattana Wittaya Academy, and attended university at the Faculty of Business Administration in Tourism and Hospitality Management at Assumption University. She graduated on 24 January 2012 with a grade point average of 3.00.

=== Career ===
Balenciaga is known for portraying Thichakorn "Kati" in Wayupak Montra which is one of the four series of 4 Hua Jai Haeng Koon Kao (4 Hearts of the Mountains) with Pakorn Chatborirak. In 2012, she was paired up with Mario Maurer in Ruk Kerd Talai Sode. In 2013, Balenciaga starred opposite Pirath "Mike" Nitipaisalkul who is a member of Thai boy band Golf & Mike together with his brother Pichaya Nitipaisalkul, better known as "Golf" in Raak Boon.

== Personal life ==
Balenciaga became engaged to "Pok" Passarakorn Chirathivat on 8 December 2017. They married on 24 December 2017. On 4 April 2019, Two of them gave birth to fraternal twins, Mia Phatsara and Mika Rakorn.

== Filmography ==
=== Film ===
Year	Title	Role	Notes
2016	Mahalai Tiang Kuen	Star	

=== TV series ===
Year	Title	Role	Network	Notes
2006	Kularb Tud Petch	Kanyika / Cat Eye Diamond	Channel 3	
2006	Chao Noo Taekwando	Potjaman (Phajaj) / Chief of the Lightning Fox	Channel 3	
2007	Khun Yay Sai Diew	Kasama Lertbawornpitak (Ploy)	Channel 3	
2007	Hub Khao Gin Khon	Na Bun	Channel 3	
2008	Badarn Jai	Purimarn Thanasak (Perng)	Channel 3	
2009	Luk Maai Blien See	Namnueng Ariyathip (Nueng)	Channel 3	Supporting Role
2010	Wan Jai Gub Nai Jom Ying	Kaewsai Benjakorn (Kaew)	Channel 3	Main Cast
2010	Wayupak Montra	Tichakorn Manipongphaisan (Kati)	Channel 3	
2011	Ngao Pray	Wassa Prasertsak (Rain)	Channel 3	
2011	Roy Marn	Bee	Channel 3	
2012	Ruk Kerd Nai Talad Sode	Kimlung	Channel 3	
2012	Raak Boon	Jatiya Naruwar (Jay)	Channel 3	
2013	Maya Tawan	Sarawaree (Waree) /Sarasama	Channel 3	Main Cast
2013	Mon Jun Tra	Sarawaree (Waree) /Sarasama	Channel 3	Lead Role
2013	Fah Krajang Dao	Sarawaree (Waree) /Sarasama	Channel 3	Main Cast
2013	Nang Rai Sai Lub	Surikarn Apidetdamrong (Zoe)	Channel 3	
2014	Nai Suan Kwan	Pedpook	Channel 3	
2014	Raak Boon 2	Jatiya Buranin (Jay) / Khun Chanjira (Past)	Channel 3	
2015	Phu Khong Yod Rak	Captain Dr. Chaweepong Khemayotin	Channel 3	
2015	Tai Ngao Jan	Paboo/Fer	Channel 3	
2016	But sa ba re fun	Butsaba kaewkerd (Zui )	Channel 3	
2017	Akom	Auerkarn	Channel 3	
2018	Buang Rak Za tan	Chomphoonist Karanyapas (Nid)	Channel 3	
2019	Thong Eak Mor Ya Tah Chaloang	Mi-rae	Channel 3	Cameo (episode 12,14)
2022	Mummy Tee Rak	Primma hidsananankun (Prim)	Channel 3	

=== Other ===
Year	Thai title	Title	Network	Notes	With
2019–present	ป๊อกกี้ on the run		YouTube:Mindset TV		

=== Concert ===
- Sam Thahan Seua Sao Limited Edition Live Show
- LOVE IS IN THE AIR : CHANNEL3 CHARITY CONCERT
