= Netiwit Chotiphatphaisal =

Thai student activist (born 1996)

- เนติวิทย์ โชติภัทร์ไพศาล
- Born: 10 September 1996 (age 30); Samut Prakan province, Thailand
- Other name: Frank (แฟรงก์)
- Education: Chulalongkorn University
- Occupations: Democracy and Human Rights activist, Producer, Publisher and Conscientious Objector
- Years active: 2012–2026
- Known for: Education for Liberation of Siam, Milk Tea Alliance, Sam Yan Press, The Last Breath of Sam Yan, 2017 Chulalongkorn University incident, conscientious objector
- Website: netiwit.com

Signature
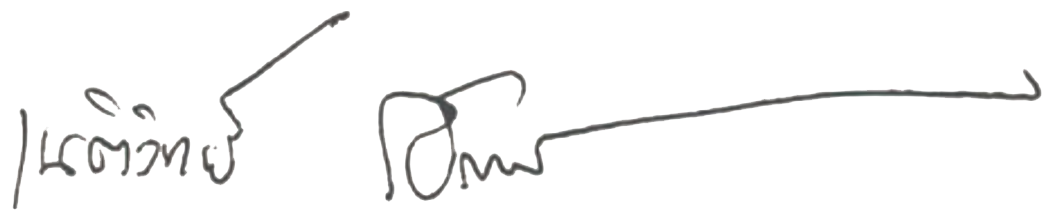

Netiwit Chotiphatphaisal (Thai: เนติวิทย์ โชติภัทร์ไพศาล; born 10 September 1996), nicknamed Frank (Thai: แฟรงก์), is a Thai student activist, peace activist and human rights activist, librarian, preservationist, conscientious objector, producer, publisher, and author. He is a founder of TERA (Thailand Educational Revolution Alliance) and Education for Liberation of Siam. Both groups aim to reform the Thai education system. In addition, he has established Samnak Nisit Sam Yan Press for publishing thoughts and ideas in Thai language, and also Humanity Beyond Borders for giving assistance to refugees and those in needs of protection.

Netiwit is an outspoken activist who speaks against the Thai Junta both on Facebook and in public. In 2018, the National Council for Peace and Order (NCPO) filed a police complaint against him and six activists for being leaders of the protest and accused them, along with thirty-two other protesters, of violating the 2015 Public Assembly Act. This endangered him with jail terms for 7–9 years. The charge was later dismissed by the court.

Netiwit was elected as the student council president at Chulalongkorn University, but was removed from the position and had his behavior score deducted by university authorities in consequence of 2017 Chulalongkorn University incident. This was in spite of support from eight Nobel laureates, as well as noted academics such as Steven Pinker, Judith Butler, Johan Galtung and others. However, after he filed a petition with the Administrative Court against Chulalongkorn University, the court ruled in his favor a year later, and his position and behavior score were restored.

Netiwit studied political science at Chulalongkorn University while being a librarian at the Santi Pracha Dhamma Library.

In April 2020, he was voted by students of Faculty of Political Science, Chulalongkorn University to be the President of the Political Science Student Union of Chulalongkorn University for 2020–2021.

On 31 March 2021, Netiwit was elected by Chulalongkorn University undergraduates to be the President of Chulalongkorn University's Student Union (SUCU) with a landslide victory, the highest votes received for the position and highest-turnout rate over decades.

He graduated from Chulalongkorn University in 2023 and is now a visiting fellow at Harvard Divinity School. Netiwit has also been credited as a follower of the Milk Tea Alliance along with Hong Kong activist Joshua Wong. In 2017, Time magazine described him as "the message for social sanity," citing his advocacy for democracy and education reform in Thailand.

In 2014, he publicly declared himself a conscientious objector against military service in Thailand, citing corruption and violence in the camps when he turned 18 years old. In 2025, he was charged in court for refusing conscription and his case was sent to the Constitutional Court, marking the first time conscientious objector case in Thai legal history. If found guilty, he could face a maximum jail sentence of three years.

In the same year, he was awarded the Prince Claus Seed Award for his free expression through film, particularly citing his documentary The Last Breath of Sam Yan, which documents the struggle against gentrification and the protection of a minority Taoist shrine.

== Early life ==
Netiwit was born in Samut Prakan province on 10 September 1996. He is the youngest child of a middle-class family of shopkeepers. As a student, he became the editor of his school magazine and was questioned for five hours by authorities after publishing criticism of mandatory haircut styles in Thai schools. The incident deepened his critique of the education system and later inspired him to form a group campaigning against these rules. He later became the youngest editor of a magazine founded by Sulak Sivaraksa and has worked closely with Sulak, a prominent socially engaged Buddhist, whom he regards as his teacher.

== TERA ==
In 2012, Netiwit and a group of fellow students formed TERA (Thailand Education Revolution Alliance). A student-led organization, TERA aimed to pressure education authorities to reform the Thai education system. This includes abolishing strict uniform codes, increasing the quality of teachers and curriculum, reducing rote-style education, and increasing the number of public schools. Netiwit gained public recognition after appearing on a television program to speak about the organization and its cause.

== Education for Liberation of Siam ==
Education for Liberation of Siam was formed in December 2013 by Netiwit and other student activists. Netiwit serves as the first secretary of the organization. The purpose of the group is to provide a platform for student activism and disseminating questionable actions and misconduct by authority figures in the Thai education system. In 2014, under the secretary general Nattanan Warintarawet, the organization gained prominence for protesting against educational reforms put in place by the Junta.

== Activism at Chulalongkorn University ==
In July 2016, Netiwit and a friend caused controversy by refusing to prostrate before the statue of King Rama V at an annual Chulalongkorn University event citing that King Rama V himself abolished the act. He received both praise and criticism from the act, notably the ire of General Prayut Chan-o-cha, leader of Thailand's junta. Netiwit has also spoken out against hazing in a common Thai initiation tradition known as rub nong (Thai: รับน้อง; RTGS: rap nong; IPA: [ráp nɔ́ːŋ]).

In 2016, Netiwit personally invited activist Joshua Wong to speak at an event commemorating the 1976 Thammasat University massacre. Wong was detained for twelve hours upon entering Thailand but managed to speak to attendees via Skype after being deported. In May 2017, Netiwit was elected as Student Council President at Chulalongkorn University.

=== Removal from the Student Council ===
Netiwit and seven other members of the student council walked out of an oath-giving ceremony requiring them to prostrate in front of a statue of King Rama V in symbolic protest. As a result, one of the members was assaulted by a professor, Reungwit Bunjongrat, and the protesting members had their "behavioural scores" cut by the university as punishment. Subsequently, this led to the members, including Netiwit, being removed from their positions on the student council. Netiwit has since received support from academics and activists internationally, including Nobel Prize laureate Roald Hoffmann, scholar and political activist and Harvard psychologist Steven Pinker. In January 2018, seven Nobel laureates sent a petition to Chulalongkorn University to appeal for Netiwit and his seven friends and to criticize the university.

In 2019 after he filed a petition with the Court against Chulalongkorn University, the administrative court ruled in his favor since then Chulalongkorn university authority returned his position and behavioural points to him.

=== Political Science Student Union of Chulalongkorn University ===
In June 2020, Netiwit and his team, Demosingh Party (Thai: พรรคสิงหราษฎร์), were elected to serve as the board of the Political Science Student Union of Chulalongkorn University (PSCU) (Thai: สโมสรนิสิตรัฐศาสตร์ จุฬาลงกรณ์มหาวิทยาลัย). Netiwit was the President of the Student Union in the Faculty of Political Science.

During his term in PSCU, he had addressed and engaged in many social and political issues, such as Chao Mae Tubtim Shrine, Scala Theatre. Moreover, his student union had published many public statements involving contemporary events and political developments in Thailand, including the forced disappearance of Thai activist-in-exile Wanchalearm Satsaksit, 2021 Myanmar Coup d'état, condemning the State's violence against demonstrations and charge of article 112, and so much more.

This term of Netiwit's team has changed the University along with the development of protests across the country against Prayut Chan-o-cha's government.

=== Student Government of Chulalongkorn University ===
In June 2021, Netiwit, alongside his Chula for ALL Party (Thai: พรรคจุฬาของทุกคน), secured a victory in the Student Union of Chulalongkorn University (SUCU) elections, assuming the role of the Student Government of Chulalongkorn University (SGCU) (Thai: องค์การบริหารสโมสรนิสิตจุฬาลงกรณ์มหาวิทยาลัย). The elections saw an unprecedented voter turnout, with Netiwit's party winning by a considerable majority.

==== Results of 2021 President of Student Union of Chulalongkorn University ====
2021 President of Student Union of Chulalongkorn University Results
Party	Candidate	Votes	%
Chula for All	Netiwit Chotiphatphaisal	10,324	70.27%
Sai Jai (Care Party)	Kittatat Wattanawerachai	2,030	13.82%
Promp (Ready Party)	Thanapat Meechim	695	4.73%
	Non Above	1,642	11.18%
Total votes		14,691	100.0%

Netiwit's leadership, however, was not without controversy. On July 20, the student union, under his guidance, held an orientation for incoming students. The event featured prominent activists like Panusaya “Rung” Sithijirawattanakul and Parit Chiwarak as guest speakers, both of whom have faced detention under Thailand's lèse-majesté law. The union also introduced a revised student handbook emphasizing freedom of speech and social rights.

The new handbook drew criticism from the university's student affairs department. In reaction, pro-monarchy alumni formed the "Chulalongkorn University Defense Committee," which pushed the university to penalize Netiwit. The pressure culminated in a letter on August 4 from the vice president of student affairs, threatening disciplinary action against him.

International organization PEN America weighed in on the issue. Karin Deutsch Karlekar, the director of free expression at risk programs at PEN America, stressed that students at globally recognized institutions like Chulalongkorn should enjoy freedom of expression without external influence from alumni.

As the head of SGCU, Netiwit also initiated a petition via Change.org in remembrance of the October 6, 1976 massacre. This called for the global recognition of "The International Day for the Protection of Students’ Freedom of Expression." His plea gained international backing, including support from personalities like Nathan Law, Mu Sochua, Zoya Phan, Edipcia Dubon, and Yevgeniya Chirikova, along with various organizations like Foundation for Individual Rights and Expression and various Thai student bodies.

Another major decision by the Student Union was to abolish the traditional Phra Kiao parade during the football match between Chulalongkorn and Thammasat Universities, denouncing it as a symbol of authoritarianism and inequality. This decision ignited debates, with Minister of Digital Chaiwut Thanakamanusorn, an alumnus of Chulalongkorn, expressing pride in the event.On October 25th, a news report at the Thai parliament showed Prime Minister, Prayut Chan-o-cha, mentioning the Student Union’s resolution. He asked the ministers whether they are alumni of Chulalongkorn University. Chaiwut and another Minister of Culture presented themselves. Prayut then told them to “take a look over that situation.”

Following this, reactionary news outlets targeted the student union members, with Thai newspaper ThaiPost News particularly condemning Netiwit's leadership, painting it as an attempt to "destroy Phra Kiao." The situation escalated when the university administration framed the union's resolution as an assault on revered figures, hinting at punitive measures against the involved students.

The climax of Netiwit's tenure came in February 2022. After only nine months as president, he faced disciplinary action stemming from an alleged violation during the Freshmen Orientation live stream of 2021. The university implicated both Netiwit and Pitchakorn Roeksomphong, the First Vice President of SGCU, accusing them of organizing activities contrary to the prescribed objectives of the Office of Student Affairs.

Chulalongkorn University Students’ Union publicly opposed the university’s order, saying the July 2021 event was organised to raise awareness of student rights and freedoms and to encourage new students to be critical of the university’s administration, which it said was permissible under the Constitution.

Student unions and councils from 19 other universities across the country have opposed the Chulalongkorn decision and demanded the order to remove union heads be revoked, saying it violated academic freedom.

Due to the mounting pressures and accusations, Netiwit was eventually removed from his position as the president of the Student Government of Chulalongkorn University.

== Political case ==
=== 2018 sedition charges ===
On 25 January 2018, Netiwit joined as an observer in an anti-junta protest organized by the Democracy Restoration Group (DRG) in the subway close to the MBK Center. On 29 January, the National Council for Peace and Order (NCPO) filed a police complaint against him and six activists for being leaders of the protest and accused them, along with thirty-two other protesters, of violating the 2015 Public Assembly Act.

On 8 February, the court released him unconditionally, along with the other thirty-two activists. However, the police sent the appeal to the court, so the case has still not been ruled on.

On 25 December 2020, the Criminal Court dismissed all charges against Netiwit and activists including Anon Nampa, Sombat Boongamanong, Rangsiman Rome and Sirawith Seritiwat.

=== RDN50 ===
On 10 February 2018, Netiwit joined as an observer in an anti-junta protest "Stop power Stop late election time up NCPO. start Democracy" in Mac Donald near Democracy Monument. The next week he was accused of violating the 2015 Public Assembly Act and disturbing peace in the country. The case later was dismissed by the court.

=== ARMY57 ===
On 24 March 2018, Metiwit joined as an activity of Thammasart University and Royal Thai Army. He was one of 57 people accused by police of violating the 2015 Public Assembly Act and disturbing peace in the country. The case has still not been ruled on by the court. The case later was dismissed by the court.

=== UN 62 ===
On 22 May 2018, Netiwit joined as a protester calling the Junta to give the general election to the Thai people and resign from the government. That day, protesters went to protest in front of the United Nations headquarter in Bangkok. Netiwit did not go there. However, the following week he was accused by police of violating the 2015 Public Assembly Act and disturbing peace in the country. The case has still not been ruled on by the court.

In May 2018, the Humboldt University student council made a public statement on the official website calling on university leaders and student representatives in Germany to stand with him and asking the Thai government to drop all charges against him and others immediately.

The case later was dismissed by the court.

== Amnesty International Thailand ==
In 2018, he ran as board member of Amnesty International Thailand, AIT, and to be elected in the Annual General Meeting 2019 on 21 July 2018. AIT then filed a request to the Bangkok Association Registrar to have a replacement of board member. However, the Bangkok Association Registrar informed AIT that they could not register and issue a permit for the registration of all-new board members invoking Netiwit's improper demeanor or lack of qualifications to be a member of an association's board. An appeal was filed, as a result of which the authorities accepted the registration of three new board members save for Netiwit.

AIT later filed an appeal with the Minister of Interior furhishing and was further informed that Netiwit was being held criminally liable in four cases for "being complicit in an act to defy the Head of the National Council for Peace and Order no. 3/2558 on "The Maintenance of Public Order and National Security's Article 12". The authorities therefore deemed his demeanor unfit for administrating an association serving the public interest and for setting an example for the general public and youth. He was therefore considered unqualified to sit as a board member of the association since it may affect public order and national security.

The alleged police document leaked to Netiwit in 2020 outlines four points regarding his 'unsuitable behavior' from when he was in high school to his time at Chulalongkorn University.

The four points are:

- Unsuitable behavior that breaches Thai etiquette and culture (citing his demand to abolish school hair-cut rules when he was in high school)
- Non-cooperation with military conscription in accordance with the law
- Leading and/or participating in a protest that would harm Thai diplomatic relations (citing his demonstration in support of Liu Xiaobo and 1989 Tiananmen Square protests)
- Actions against provisions and litigation

In October 2019, AIT and Netiwit filed a lawsuit with the Administrative Court, the defendants are the registrar for alleged abuse of power in disqualifying Netiwit and Interior Minister Gen Anupong Paochinda for neglect of duty for failing to deliver the appeal result in the stipulated timeframe.

On 17 February 2023, the Central Administrative Court overturned the 2019 decision of the Minister of Interior, which had rejected an appeal by Amnesty International Thailand (AIT) to register Netiwit Chotiphatphaisal as a member of its Board of Directors. The Court cited the Constitution of the Kingdom of Thailand’s Section 29, emphasizing the principle of presumed innocence until proven guilty. Given that Netiwit had not been judicially declared guilty, his prior activism shouldn't render him unsuitable for the AIT position.

The Director General's refusal to register Netiwit was deemed an unlawful violation of constitutional rights, seen as an excessive measure unrelated to public order or national security. Both the decision of the Director General of the Department of Provincial Administration and the Minister of Interior's appeal dismissal were declared unlawful.

Ms. Thitirat Thipsamritkul, Chairperson of Amnesty International Thailand, noted Netiwit's association with AIT since March 2012 and his election to the Board in July 2018. She hailed the Court's verdict as a pivotal move in upholding the freedom of association in Thailand and reaffirming the boundaries of state power in respect to individual rights.

== Conscientious Objection ==
In 2014, after the Thai coup, Netiwit Chotiphatphaisal publicly announced his position as a conscientious objector on the War Resisters' International website. This declaration reflected his deeper convictions against enforced military service.

Upon entering university, he navigated the provisions of Thai law that allowed him to defer his military service. Each year he was mandated to report to the military center to reaffirm his deferment, which he used as an opportunity to raise awareness about conscription. Accompanied by banners and posters, he criticized the system and highlighted alleged corruption within the Thai military. On one occasion, he and friends conducted a poll at the center, which showed a majority of young men opposed to enforced recruitment.

In 2023, at the age of 26, he temporarily ordained as a Buddhist monk. With the end of his deferment approaching, he wrote to local authorities reaffirming his conscientious objection since the age of 18. Some observers saw his monkhood as a strategic move to highlight the injustice of conscription, given the controversy that would surround the arrest of a monk. In an interview with Tricycle: The Buddhist Review, he contrasted militarism with Buddhist pacifism, stating he was prepared to face up to three years’ imprisonment but would remain steadfast in his beliefs. He disrobed in April 2023.

On 22 May 2025, the Samut Prakan Provincial Court indicted Netiwit for evading military conscription under Article 45 of the 1954 Military Conscription Act. Hearings took place on 10–11 September 2025, during which witness testimony concluded, and the court scheduled the verdict for 3 November 2025. However, the court also indicated that it may refer the relevant provisions of the Military Service Act to the Constitutional Court. If so, the provincial court’s verdict could be delayed until the higher court rules on the law’s validity.

Observers have noted that such a referral could have far-reaching consequences. Thailand mandates military conscription for men aged 21 and above, decided each April by a lottery system. The right to conscientious objection is not legally recognized. Netiwit’s case is therefore seen as the first legal challenge in Thailand on this issue, with potential implications for over 100,000 young men drafted each year.

Amnesty International has called on Thai authorities to immediately drop the charges. Montse Ferrer, Amnesty’s Regional Research Director, said: “Netiwit’s refusal to take part in this outdated system should be a wake-up call for the Thai authorities to urgently reform the country’s legal framework to allow for alternative services, in line with international human rights law and standards… Authorities must immediately drop all charges against Netiwit.”

On 5 August 2025, Bhikkhu Bodhi, a well-known Buddhist scholar, issued a letter to Thai authorities supporting Netiwit’s claim for conscientious objector status. In the statement, he referred to Buddhist precepts against taking life and emphasized values of loving-kindness (mettā) and compassion (karuṇā), arguing that participation in military service would conflict with these commitments.

== Milk Tea Alliance ==
Netiwit has been credited as a transnational activist for the Thai and Hong Kong democracy movements, and as an early forerunner of the Milk Tea Alliance. In 2016 he invited Joshua Wong to speak at Chulalongkorn University, and in 2017 he published a Thai translation of a book in support of the Hong Kong pro-democracy movement.

Since 2018, he has been one of the organizers of annual protests in front of the Chinese embassy in Bangkok to commemorate the 1989 Tiananmen Square protests and massacre. When police blocked demonstrations in 2020, citing coronavirus restrictions, Netiwit marked the occasion by distributing “Tiananmen cookies” as an alternative act of commemoration.

In 2018, he co-founded Humanity Immigration Borders, an initiative raising funds to help refugees in Thailand, support their self-organized activities, and produce academic work highlighting human rights violations abroad. He profiled Lao environmental activist Houayheuang Xayabouly (“Muay”), who was arrested in 2019, and campaigned for her release. In 2020, Humanity Beyond Borders, together with the Manushya Refuges Campus and the Human Rights Foundation, submitted a petition on her behalf to the Working Group on Arbitrary Detention (UNWGAD). In January 2021, UNWGAD declared her detention arbitrary and called for her immediate release.

Scholars have noted Netiwit’s role in shaping regional transnational networks. A 2024 study in The Journal of Asian Studies described him as a key figure in transnational activism in Northeast and Southeast Asia, showing how connections between Thai, Hong Kong, and Taiwanese activists stem from everyday interactions and increased mobility in the globalized era.

== Urban justice ==
Netiwit has been an outspoken advocate for urban justice, particularly in opposing the gentrification of neighborhoods surrounding Chulalongkorn University. In June 2020, he and other Chulalongkorn University students demonstrated the university’s plan to demolish the Chao Mae Tubtim Shrine, a Taoist sea goddess shrine located near campus, to make way for condominiums. Arguing that the shrine represented the last surviving heritage of the Sam Yan community, he quoted Oscar Wilde’s phrase that “the cynic knows the price of everything and the value of nothing.”

In 2021, as president of the Chulalongkorn University Student Union, Netiwit and his peers raised banners in front of the historic Scala Theatre, protesting its demolition. The Scala, once the largest standalone cinema in Southeast Asia, was widely regarded as a cultural landmark. He criticized University for acting “less like an institute of higher learning and more like a big business.”

In 2023, Netiwit produced the documentary The Last Breath of Sam Yan, which chronicles students’ and community members’ struggle to preserve the Chao Mae Tubtim Shrine demolition plans by Chulalongkorn University. The film situates the shrine’s defense within broader debates about gentrification and the erasure of cultural heritage in Bangkok. It received positive reviews from international media, including The Guardian and Nikkei Asia, and was screened at House Sam Yan and the Doc Club and Pub. The documentary has since been recognized as part of Bangkok’s wider struggle for urban justice.

== Recognition ==
- In 2013, Netiwit had been nominated for a National Human Rights Commission (NHRC) award, but he rejected it, stating that he doubts whether the NHRC really takes the human rights issues seriously.
- In 2018 Netiwit was invited as one of the speakers at Oslo Freedom Forum 2018, which sponsored by the Human Rights Foundation.
- In 2018, Netiwit was announced as one of 50 Asians to watch in the public and social sector by the Straits Times (Singapore Press) as an honor to his social work, especially in democracy, education and military conscription.
- President of the Political Science Student Union of Chulalongkorn University for 2020–2021
- President of Chulalongkorn University's Student Union (SUCU)for 2021-2022

== Sam Yan Press ==
Samnak Nisit Sam Yan Publishing House, known as Sam Yan Press (Thai: สำนักพิมพ์สำนักนิสิตสามย่าน), was established by Netiwit and his colleagues after his removal from the Chulalongkorn University Student Council in 2017.

Founded as a non-profit publisher, Sam Yan Press aims to publish student writings as well as Thai translations of foreign political and philosophical works related to human rights and democratic ideas. Its stated mission is to bridge knowledge between East and West, strengthen communication between professors, students, and the wider public, and promote a secure foundation for democracy and human rights in Thailand.

The first title published was Time is on Our Side: A Birthday Book for Joshua Wong (2017), released while Joshua Wong was imprisoned. Translated by Netiwit, the book included Martin Luther King Jr.’s “Letter from Birmingham Jail”, Liu Xiaobo’s “Tiananmen Square: The Hunger Strike Declaration”, and an interview with Wong. Since then, the press has published works by philosophers and activists including Isaiah Berlin, Cass Sunstein, Timothy Snyder, Václav Havel, Rebecca Solnit, Byung-Chul Han, James C. Scott, Tommie Shelby, Roger Scruton, Peter Singer (Animal Liberation), and Nobel laureate Liu Xiaobo.

Wong praised the initiative, stating: “Sam Nak Nisit Sam Yan Publishing offers to youngsters of Thai a lesson on how to confront authoritarian oppression under a hard-line policy of the regime.”

Sam Yan Press has also faced external pressures. In 2022, the editors revealed they had been approached by a private agency on behalf of a Chinese businessman, who offered two million baht for the press to dissolve itself—an attempt widely seen as linked to Beijing’s efforts to silence critical publishers. The offer was repeatedly pressed on Netiwit, including while he was in a Buddhist retreat as a monk. Sam Yan Press publicly rejected the offer, calling it “a serious threat to our independence, security, and freedom of expression.”

Despite such threats, Sam Yan Press continues to translate and publish politically and philosophically significant works. It has been described as part of the regional Milk Tea Alliance of pro-democracy movements, and has published writings by Hong Kong, mainland Chinese, and Taiwanese authors including Joshua Wong, Liu Xiaobo, and imprisoned Uyghur scholar Ilham Tohti.

== Bibliography ==
=== Books written ===
- ให้เธอไว้อ่านเล่น:คำประกาศความเป็นไทในโรงเรียน (2014)
- ประวัติศาสตร์ที่อยากอธิบาย (2015)
- นักเรียนเลวในระบบการศึกษาแสนดี (2016)
- โลกเปลี่ยน โรงเรียนต้องเปลี่ยน (2017)
- ประเทศไทยเปลี่ยน เกณฑ์ทหารต้องเปลี่ยน (2018)
- ฝันให้ไกล ไปให้ถึง: ประชาธิปไตยในระดับนิสิตนักศึกษา (2018)
- เอาชีวิตรอดในจุฬาลงกรณ์มหาวิทยาลัย (2018)

=== Books translated ===
- เวลาอยู่ข้างเรา: หนังสือวันเกิดโจชัว หว่อง (Time is on Our Side: A Book for Joshua Wong's 21st Birthday) แปลโดย เนติวิทย์ โชติภัทร์ไพศาล และภวัต อัครพิพัฒนา (กรุงเทพฯ: มูลนิธิเสฐียรโกเศศ-นาคะประทีป, 2017)
- แด่ศตวรรษของเรา: ความเรียงสามชิ้นของไอเซยา เบอร์ลิน (Messages to Our Century: Three Essays of Isaiah Berlin) แปลโดย เนติวิทย์ โชติภัทร์ไพศาล ชยางกูร ธรรมอัน และธรณ์เทพ มณีเจริญ (กรุงเทพฯ: มูลนิธิเสฐียรโกเศศ-นาคะประทีป, 2018)
- ว่าด้วยทรราชย์: 20 บทเรียนจากศตวรรษที่ 20 (On Tyranny: Twenty Lessons from the Twentieth Century) โดย ทิโมธี สไนเดอร์ แปลโดย เนติวิทย์ โชติภัทร์ไพศาล และชยางกูร ธรรมอัน บรรณาธิการแปลโดย วริตตา ศรีรัตนา (กรุงเทพฯ: สำนักพิมพ์สำนักนิสิตสามย่าน, 2018)
- ตัวข้าไซร้ ไร้ศัตรู: บทความคัดสรรของหลิว เสี่ยวโป (I Have No Enemies: Selected Essays of Liu Xiaobo) โดย หลิว เสี่ยวโป แปลโดย เนติวิทย์ โชติภัทร์ไพศาล ชยางกูร และคณะ (กรุงเทพฯ: สำนักพิมพ์สำนักนิสิตสามย่าน, 2018)
