= Chulalongkorn University incident =

Chulalongkorn University incidentmay refer to:

- An incident on 28 October 1953, where Chit Phumisak was attacked and physically thrown off the stage in the main auditorium
- 2017 Chulalongkorn University incident on 3 August 2017, an altercation surrounding an act of protest led by Netiwit Chotiphatphaisal during the university's initiation ceremony
