= Chao Mae Thapthim Shrine, Saphan Lueang =

Shrine in Pathum Wan District, Bangkok, Thailand

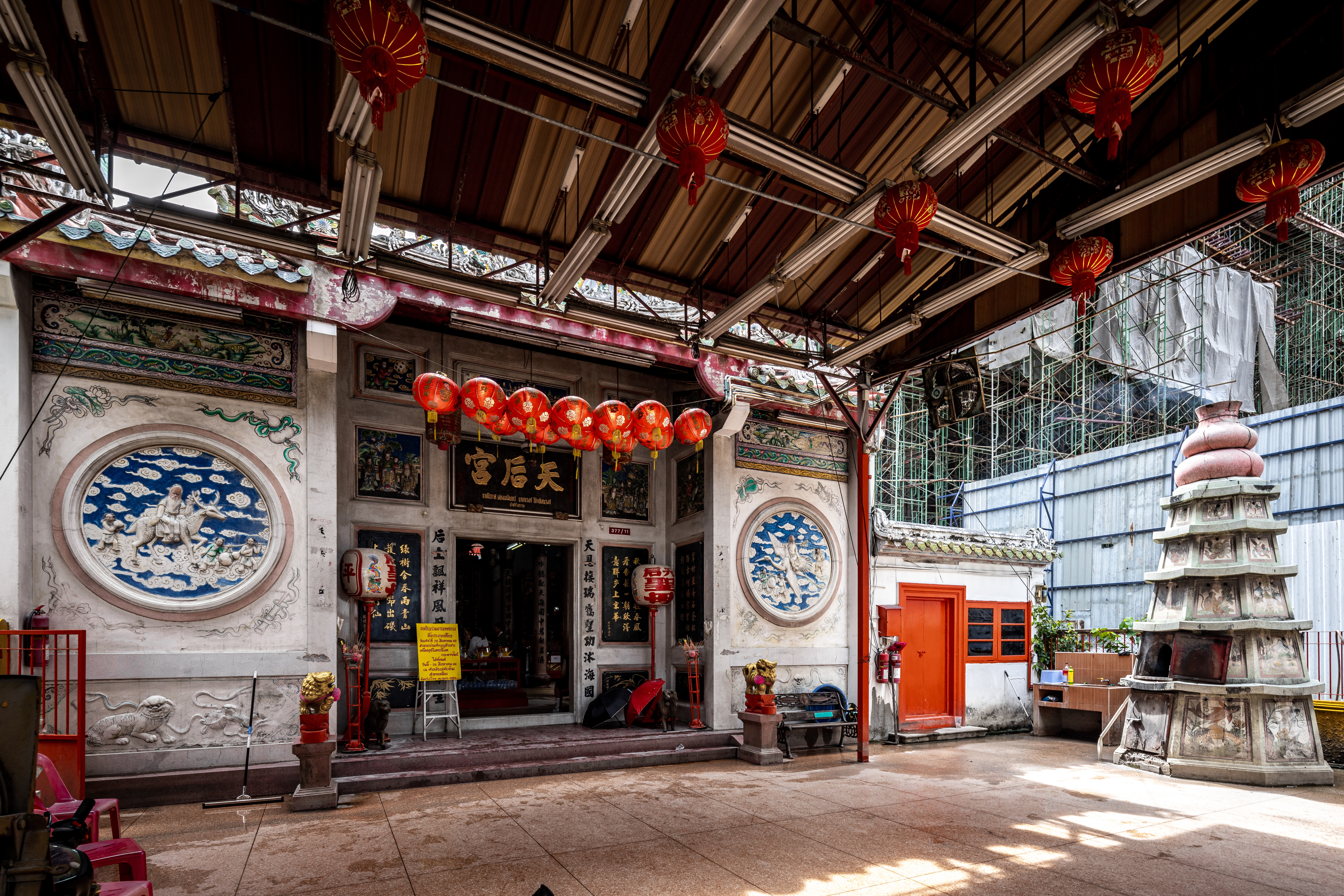
Chao Mae Thapthim Shrine, Saphan Lueang

Chao Mae Thapthim Shrine (Thai: ศาลเจ้าแม่ทับทิม; Chinese: 天后聖母宮; pinyin: Tiānhòu shèngmǔ gōng), also known as the Mazu Shrine, is a historic shrine in the Saphan Lueang neighborhood of Pathum Wan District, Bangkok. It serves as an important cultural and spiritual landmark for Bangkok’s ethnic Chinese community, particularly descendants of Teochew immigrants.

== History ==
The shrine, dedicated to Mazu (goddess of the sea) and Shui Wei Sheng Niang, dates back over 150 years, predating the establishment of Chulalongkorn University in 1917. It was renovated in 1959 and served as a shelter during World War II, becoming a center of worship for the local Chinese community.

== Description ==
The shrine is located near Sam Yan on land owned by Chulalongkorn University. It plays a vital role in preserving the cultural heritage of Bangkok’s ethnic Chinese community. However, the shrine is under threat of demolition as part of the Sam Yan Smart City project, which plans to replace it with a condominium.

== Conflict and redevelopment ==
The shrine's caretaker, Penprapa Ployseesuay, and community activists have resisted relocation plans proposed by the Office of Property Management, Chulalongkorn University (PMCU), which seeks to move the shrine to a site near Chulalongkorn University Centenary Park. Activists argue that the relocation disregards the shrine’s cultural and historical significance. PMCU has filed lawsuits to evict the caretakers, seeking damages of 122 million baht, sparking public outcry and the viral hashtag #saveศาลเจ้าแม่ทับทิม (#SaveTheMazuShrine) on Twitter.

== Cultural and social impact ==
The Chao Mae Thapthim Shrine has become a symbol of resistance against gentrification in Bangkok. Advocacy efforts include artistic activism such as the 2023 "Exile-bition," an art exhibition at the shrine featuring mixed-media works and critiques of urban redevelopment. The shrine continues to attract worshippers, particularly younger generations, who see it as a vital link to their cultural heritage amidst modernization.

== The Last Breath of Sam Yan ==
The struggle to preserve the shrine was documented in the 2023 Thai film The Last Breath of Sam Yan, directed by Prempapat Plittapolkranpim and produced by student activists, Netiwit Chotiphatphaisal and Settanant Thanakitkoses. The film received critical acclaim, winning the Suphannahong National Film Award for Best Documentary. It was praised for its depiction of grassroots activism and urban heritage preservation. Pulitzer Prize-winning journalist Ian Johnson described it as "a movement, capturing the audacious spirit of students pitted against commercial giants and state machinery."

== Heritage concerns ==
The shrine’s fate reflects broader trends of cultural loss in Bangkok. Conservationists argue that Thailand’s current heritage laws are inadequate for protecting sites like the shrine. Assistant Professor Wasana Wongsurawat emphasized the growing interest among Thai students in resisting gentrification and protecting historical landmarks.
