= Dubon =

Dubon or Dubón may refer to:

- Dubon coat, Israel Defense Forces windproof military winter coat

== People ==
- Edipcia Dubón, Nicaraguan politician and human rights activist
- Eduardo Epaminondas González Dubón, president of the Constitutional Court of Guatemala who was assassinated in 1994
- Mauricio Dubón (born 1994), Honduran professional baseball player
- Víctor Hugo Merino Dubón (born 1979), a Salvadoran soccer player
