= The Last Breath of Sam Yan =

- Release poster
- ลมหายใจเฮือกสุดท้ายของสามย่าน
- Directed by: Prempapat Plittapolkranpim
- Produced by: Netiwit Chotiphatphaisal; Settanant Thanakitkoses
- Release date: 2023
- Running time: 75 minutes
- Country: Thailand

The Last Breath of Sam Yan (Thai: ลมหายใจเฮือกสุดท้ายของสามย่าน) is a 2023 Thai documentary directed by Prempapat Plittapolkranpim and co-produced by Netiwit Chotiphatphaisal and Settanant Thanakitkoses. The film premiered on June 13, 2023, at House Samyan theater and was officially released on June 15, 2023.

== Synopsis ==
The documentary follows a group of students opposing the demolition of the Chao Mae Thap Thim Shrine at Saphan Lueang to make way for a high-rise building as part of a Chulalongkorn University development project. Through interviews and documentation, the film highlights the cultural and historical significance of the shrine and the community's fight to preserve it.

== Themes ==
The film examines gentrification in the Sam Yan area in Pathum Wan District, presenting it as a microcosm of Bangkok's broader urban development challenges. It features interviews with stakeholders such as academics Sulak Sivaraksa and Wasana Wongsurawat, Bangkok governor Chadchart Sittipunt, and Chulalongkorn University President Bundhit Eua-arporn. Renowned author Philip Cornwel-Smith described it as the "Bangkok Alamo," emphasizing its resonance as a story of defiance and cultural preservation.

== Reception ==
The Suphannahong National Film Award of the film, on a temporary display in 2026

The film received critical acclaim, winning the Bangkok Critics Assembly Award for Best Documentary and Thailand's National Award for Best Documentary. Critics praised its compelling depiction of urban heritage preservation and the proactive stance of its young filmmakers.

It won the 2023 Suphannahong National Film Award for the best documentary.

Max Crosbie-Jones of Nikkei Asia highlighted its portrayal of student activism and the broader societal implications of gentrification. He lauded the film for urging more responsible preservation of cultural heritage.

Pulitzer Prize-winning journalist Ian Johnson remarked that the film is "not just a film—it’s a movement, capturing the audacious spirit of students pitted against commercial giants and state machinery." Similarly, Davarian L. Baldwin, author of In the Shadow of the Ivory Tower, described it as "both tragic and heartwarming, powerfully capturing a university’s soulless landgrab and the humanity of those who resist."

Loretta Lees, a professor at Boston University, noted that the documentary "exposes the lack of care universities show to long-standing communities on their doorstep and the local cultural, sacred spaces dear to them."

== Release and Distribution ==
The Last Breath of Sam Yan premiered at House Samyan on June 13, 2023, followed by commercial screenings at the same venue and at the Doc Club and Pub starting June 15, 2023. Special screenings were also held at the Foreign Correspondents' Club of Thailand on June 29, 2023, and in Thai provinces including Songkhla, Chiang Mai, and Nakhon Ratchasima.

The documentary gained international recognition through its selection at prominent film festivals such as the Student World Impact Film Festival 2023 in the United States, the Jagran Film Festival 2023 in India, and Lane Doc Fest 2023 in Jackson, Tennessee, USA.

On February 9, 2024, the film was added to Netflix, granting it global accessibility and expanding its audience.

== International Screenings ==
The film reached global audiences through screenings at prominent venues: it was featured at Duke University on November 22, 2024, with a Q&A session with producer Netiwit Chotiphatphaisal focusing on urban studies discourse. On October 23, 2024, it was screened at Boston University during a discussion on urban transformation and gentrification. Additionally, it was showcased at Metrograph Theater in New York City, emphasizing its global cultural relevance to an international audience.
