= 2017 Chulalongkorn University incident =

Criminal incident in Thailand

On 3 August 2017, Netiwit Chotiphatphaisal and seven Chulalongkorn University students and council members walked out of an initiation ceremony where first-year students were to pay respect to former kings Chulalongkorn and Vajiravudh in the courtyard of the university. A furious professor suddenly put one vice student council president, Supaluk Bumroongkij, in a chokehold. The incident was filmed and distributed causing a national controversy.

After an investigation, Chulalongkorn University ruled in favour of the professor and deducted behavioral points from all eight students involved and banned them from participating in university events. The decision was controversial, however, and criticized by the university's alumni with a global petition created by the Thai Academic Network for Civil Rights (TANCR).

== Background of the initiation ceremony ==
Since 1990, Chulalongkorn University hosted an annual event in which new students pledge their allegiance to King Chulalongkorn, who founded the university, by prostrating. The act of prostration was abolished by Chulalongkorn himself.

== The incident ==
Chulalongkorn University set the pledging event to occur on 3 August 2017. However, before the ceremony could end, Netiwit and seven people from his group abruptly left the ceremony after bowing in respect. A professor from the Faculty of Science, Ruangwit Bunjongrat, put the last member of the group to leave in a chokehold while shouting “Where is the animal, Nene?” (Animal being a curse word in Thai and Nene referring to Netiwit).

Afterwards, images of the professor assaulting the student and of the eight students walking out of the ceremony became widespread causing much criticism of about the appropriateness of both actions. The offending professor later said he did what he did out of goodwill for his students and that he was so distressed by the incident that he had to be admitted a hospital.

The protesting group of students argued that they were acting upon the decree of King Chulalongkorn and that they have already spoken to the university about providing a space for people with dissenting opinions. Chulalongkorn University rejected this reasoning and saw the protest as too political. They also said they had already arranged a separate space for those with dissenting opinions and saw that the students' actions were inappropriate.

== Result ==
The university set up an investigating committee and summoned Netiwit, along with other offending students, to be interviewed on the 25th and 30th of August. Pomthong Malakul Na Ayudhaya, vice president of Chulalongkorn University, ordered the deduction of 25 points from the students behavioral scores which bars them from applying for jobs and participating in certain activities within the university for the duration of their studies.

Netiwit argued that the university did not give them justice, the investigation period was far too short, and that the professor who assaulted one of the students was not under investigation. Some days after this decision, the university gave an official statement claiming that the incident is an "internal issue" and has nothing to do with politics. Professor Ruangwit Bunjongrat and Chulalongkorn University have both said they were regretful that the incident occurred, but also said that they were not completely to blame explaining that they based their decision on traditional Thai culture. However, later the university secretly fixed the statement by removing any criticism of professor Ruangrit Bunjongrat and the removal of the section concerning conservative explanations of Thai culture.

== Support for both sides ==
=== Chulalongkorn University ===
After the decision to deduct behavioral scores from the students, statements were made by alumni organizations of the Faculty of Education, Faculty of Engineering, and Chulalongkorn University Alumni Association Under Royal Patronage in support of the university. Netiwit complained that one of these alumni members was on the panel which made the decision to deduct his behavioral scores. He also alleged that the president of The University Council, Suchada Keeranan is a supporter of People's Democratic Reform Committee.

=== The student activists ===
Before the decision, Netiwit received a letter from academic Noam Chomsky. The eight students also received support from academics from 128 universities around the world, who signed the petition created and circulated by TANCR supporting the freedom of expression at Chulalongkorn University.

On 2 October 2017, The International Student Association of Chulalongkorn University gave an official statement on the matter and put down names on a petition in support of the eight student activists. They asked for justice and the investigation of Ruangwit Bunjongrat while condemning The university for the incident.

On 10 October 2017, after an appeal to the decision was requested, 150 academics, activists, and scientists from 19 countries gave an official statement in support of the eight students.

Supporters include;

1. Johan Galtung
2. Noam Chomsky
3. Perry Link
4. Henry Hardy
5. Lawrence M. Krauss
6. Judith Butler
7. Gloria Steinem
8. Michael Walzer
9. Jean-Philippe Béja
10. James C. Scott
11. Steven Pinker
12. Paul Bloom
13. Michael Shermer
14. Ashis Nandy
15. Timothy Snyder
16. Caroline Patricia Lucas
17. Ilan Pappé
18. Dorion Sagan
19. Joshua Cohen
20. Tariq Ali
21. Derek Wall
22. Wolfram Schaffar
23. William Deresiewicz
24. Mark Lilla
25. Catherine Malabou
26. Ruth Yeazell
27. Hayden Pelliccia
28. John Roemer
29. Medea Benjamin
30. Norman Finkelstein
31. Pavlina Tcherneva
32. Richard Somerville
33. Tamara Loos
34. Rebeca Tuvel
35. David Loy
36. Roald Hoffman

== Appeal ==
The eight students sent an official request for an appeal on September 25, 2017. The rules state that a decision must be made within 30 days. Tongthong Chandransu, who is alleged to be a royalist and conservative, is the chairman of the board. The decision has been deferred since September 2017, even though official rules state the committee has just thirty days to make a decision.

On 15 January 2017, seven Nobel Prize laureates including Dudley Herschbach, Richard Roberts, John Mather, Roy Glauber, Jerome Friedman, Sheldon Glashow, Brian Josephson, along with other notable academics such as Gerhard Casper, the former president of Stanford University, Herbert C. Kelman, Henry Giroux, David Graeber, and Lawrence Lessig sent an open statement to Chulalongkorn University's president and the president of the appeal committee, asking them to find a better solution.
