= National Federation of Motion Pictures and Contents Associations =

- Abbreviation: MPC
- Formation: 1991; 35 years ago
- Type: Film organization
- Headquarters: Huai Khwang, Bangkok, Thailand
- President: Visute Poolvoralaks
- Website: http://www.mpc.or.th/

The National Federation of Motion Pictures and Contents Associations (Thai: สมาพันธ์สมาคมภาพยนตร์เเห่งชาติ, MPC, previously known as the Federation of National Film Associations) is the main professional and trade organization of Thailand's film industry. It was established in 1991 in order to provide a central platform for the various existing professional associations, and now has 20 member associations. The federation is a member of the Asian Film Industry Network. The annual Suphannahong National Film Awards is hosted by the federation.
