= Sam Yan Press =

Thai independent publishing house

- สำนักพิมพ์สำนักนิสิตสามย่าน
- Formation: 2017
- Type: Publishing House NGO
- Founding Editor: Netiwit Chotiphatphaisal
- Managing Editor: Krittapas Chedjaroenrat
- Editor-in-Chief: Jirapreeya Saeboo
- Website: https://samyanpress.org/

Sam Yan Press (Thai: สำนักพิมพ์สำนักนิสิตสามย่าน) is an independent publishing house established in 2017 by student activists, including Netiwit Chotiphatphaisal, a prominent Thai student activist. This founding came after Netiwit was dismissed from his position as president of the Chulalongkorn University Student Council in the same year. The publishing house is known for its focus on books and translations that emphasize freedom of expression, human rights, and democracy. This includes critical perspectives on the Chinese government. The establishment aimed to create a space for students to engage in and translate political and societal literature from foreign languages into Thai. The name "Sam Yan" is derived from the local area surrounding Chulalongkorn University.

The publishing house has produced and translated books on various topics, such as animal rights, the Milk Tea Alliance, and women's rights.

== Chinese businessman contacted to close down publishing house in 2022 ==
In May 2022, Netiwit Chotiphatphaisal, a Thai activist and founder of Sam Yan Press, received an email from a private investigator in Bangkok seeking to arrange a meeting between the publishing house and a Chinese businessman. Netiwit stated that he and his team ignored the contact, believing it to be a scam. Later, in July, the detective reached out to another member of the executive team, informing them that the Chinese businessman was prepared to offer 4 million baht to shut down the publishing operations. The detective explained that the businessman's objective was to demonstrate to the Chinese government his influence in Thailand.

In September, according to a post by the publishing house, the executive team received another email from the investigation company. This time, they were offered 2 million baht if they agreed to sign a “business cessation document” to shut down the company. After consulting with a lawyer, the Sam Yan Press team decided to meet with the investigator in an attempt to learn the identity of the Chinese businessman and the reasons behind his actions. As activists and student leaders, the publishing house firmly rejected all offers, stating that accepting such a proposal would be a betrayal of their principles and the values they stand for.

On October 2, the executive team of Sam Yan Press received a follow-up email from the investigation company, clarifying that the businessman in question was not a member of the Chinese government. The email included a copy of his passport as proof of his identity. Despite this additional information, the publishing house once again refused the offer.
