= Education for Liberation of Siam =

- Formation: 2 December 2013
- Type: NPO
- Legal status: Non Active
- Purpose: Reform Thai Education system
- First secretary: Netiwit Chotiphatphisal
- Current secretary: None
- Website: https://www.facebook.com/share/1DrtHtsnFC/?mibextid=wwXIfr

Education for Liberation of Siam (Thai: กลุ่มการศึกษาเพื่อความเป็นไท; ELS) is a group of high school students who demand reform of the Thai education system. The core members were from the Thailand Educational Revolution Alliance. The group was established on 2 December 2013 by Netiwit Chotiphatphaisal, who was the first secretary of the group, followed by Nattanan Warintawaret. The group created a fan page on Facebook called "The Education for Liberation of Siam" to be a platform for disseminating information concerning misconducts and questionable actions made by politicians or figures of authority that have an effect on the Thai educational community.

== Philosophy ==
Members of the group agree share the same ideology that educational reform in Thailand is a necessity. The philosophy of the group is that education should emphasize human aspects, student beliefs, respect towards humanities and the knowledge inside individuals. The group believes that people should not be seen as empty vessels to force foreign ideologies into or to exercising authority (creating rules to name one) without consulting the principles of logic, democracy and human rights. The group states that its existence is a testament to Thai youth's dedication and determination to oppose the use of the education system as an instrument for propaganda or for hidden political agendas. The group also opposes teacher violence and the demanding of sex for grades in Thai schools.

== Activities ==
Before the 2014 coup d'état in Thailand, the group held a small anti-coup event in front of an army camp, termed “Presenting Flowers to Show Appreciation towards the Military Officers for not Committing a Coup d'état". From 2014, the group was active in opposing the Thai junta and its 12 Core Values of Thai People, which were penned by the junta leader Prayut Chan-o-cha and incorporated into the public school curriculum after the 2014 coup d’état. It also boycotted the junta's education reform student forum.

In January 2015, Thai military television banned Nattanan Warintarawet, an ELS activist when she posed questions regarding the coup d’état's legitimacy with a member of the junta-appointed National Reform Council. In September, an ELS activist was removed from an auditorium where General Prayut was speaking after raising a banner asking for the civic duties academic subject be removed from school curricula.

In March 2016, the group criticized the draft 2016 constitution for reducing the number of years of free education from 12 to 9, resulting in a change to the draft. On 4 June, the ELS participated in an Anti-SOTUS protest criticizing Thailand's Seniority, Order, Tradition, Unity, and Spirit (SOTUS) university hazing system. On 6 October, Warisa Sukkumnoed, Secretary-general of the ELS, spoke at a Chulalongkorn University organized TED talk-like event “The 40 Years of 6 Oct. The New Generation Commemoration” to commemorate Thailand's 1976 October massacre.

On 4 February 2017, the ELS held a 'National Senior's Day' event to parody Thailand's National Children's Day, co-ordinated by Parit ‘Penguin’ Chiwarak. In July 2017, Sanhanutta Sartthaporn, a grade 11 student and then Secretary-General of the ELS, was allegedly intimidated by two plainclothes soldiers while having breakfast at his school's canteen after the ELS published a statement asking Prayut to cease interfering in the Thai education system. A Ministry of Defence spokesperson subsequently stated that Sanhanutta was merely being asked to cooperate.

On 6 January 2019, members of ELS called for a rescheduling of the GAT and PAT examinations and for a general election, in the first protest since the repeal of the 2014-2019 Thai military diktats restricting freedom of assembly and the right to protest, held at Victory Monument.

On 10 July 2020, the group presented 58 petitions to the Ministry of Education calling for the abolition of military-style school haircut regulations following an outcry over strict rules, including abortion rights, one school banning fringes and an all girls' school's banning of bangs.

== See also ==
- 2020–2021 Thai protests
