= Santi Pracha Dhamma Library =

- Location: Khlong San District, Bangkok
- Scope: Social science, Humanities and Spiritual books
- Established: 2003 by Sulak Sivaraksa

Other information
- Director: Netiwit Chotiphatphaisal
- Website: www.facebook.com/bookloverlibrary

Santi Pracha Dhamma Library (Thai: ห้องสมุดสันติประชาธรรม) is the social science and spiritual library. It was created in 2003, making for the memorial place for the late Puey Ungpakorn, the statesman of Thailand, who had died in 2000. It was founded by Sulak Sivaraksa, a renowned Thai social activist and social critic.

The library aims to be a place for spiritual searching, intellectual property resource, available for social activists and all people.

It is located in Khlong San District, Charoen Nakhon Road, Bangkok.
