= Education in Thailand =

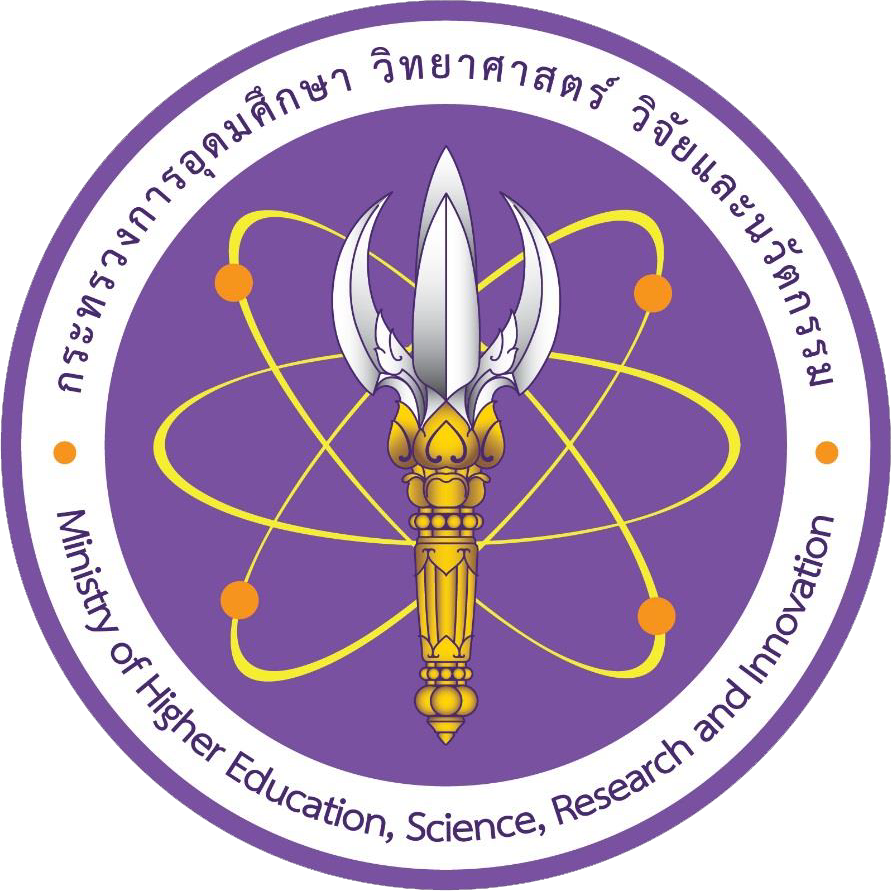

Ministry of Education Ministry of Higher Education, Science, Research and Innovation
- Minister of Education Minister of Higher Education, Science, Research and Innovation: Prasert Jantararuangtong Yodchanan Wongsawat

National education budget (FY2025)
- Budget: 340,774.6 million baht

General details
- Primary languages: Thai; English
- System type: National
- Formal establishment: 1892

Literacy (2012)
- Total: 93.5%

Enrollment
- Total: 13,157,103 (2010)
- Primary: 3,651,613 (2010)
- Secondary: 1,695,223 (2010)
- Post secondary: 663,150 (2010)

Education in Thailand is provided mainly by the Thai government through the Ministry of Education from pre-school to senior high school. A free basic education to fifteen years is guaranteed by the Thai constitution. This basic education comprises six years of elementary school and three years of lower secondary school. In addition, three years of pre-school and three years of upper-secondary education is available free of charge, but are non-compulsory.

Children aged 6–12 will go to elementary school (prathom (Thai: ประถม)). From the age of 12, they attend secondary school (matthayom (Thai: มัธยม)). While secondary school also lasts six years, only the first three years are mandatory. After grade 9 (Matthayom 3), pupils can pursue upper-secondary education in a university-preparatory track, or continue their studies in vocational school programs.

Homeschooling is legal in Thailand. Thailand's constitution and education law explicitly recognize alternative education and considers the family to be an educational institution. A homeschool law passed in 2004, Ministerial Regulation No. 3 on the right to basic education by the family, governs homeschooling. Families must submit an application to homeschool and students are assessed annually.

The Human Rights Measurement Initiative finds that Thailand fulfills 69.5% of what they should be able to fulfill for the right to education, based on their level of income.

== School system overview ==
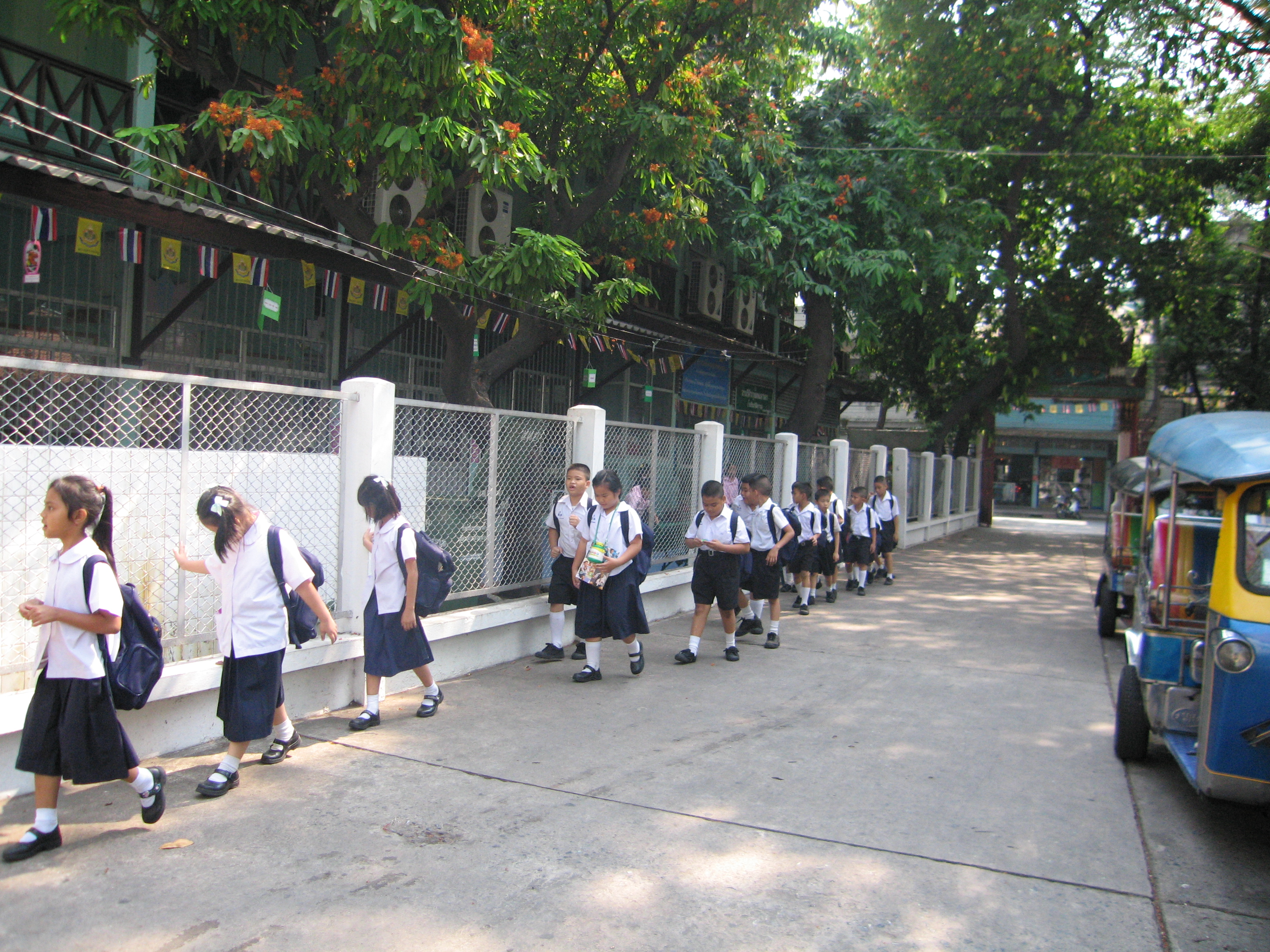
Elementary school students, Thailand

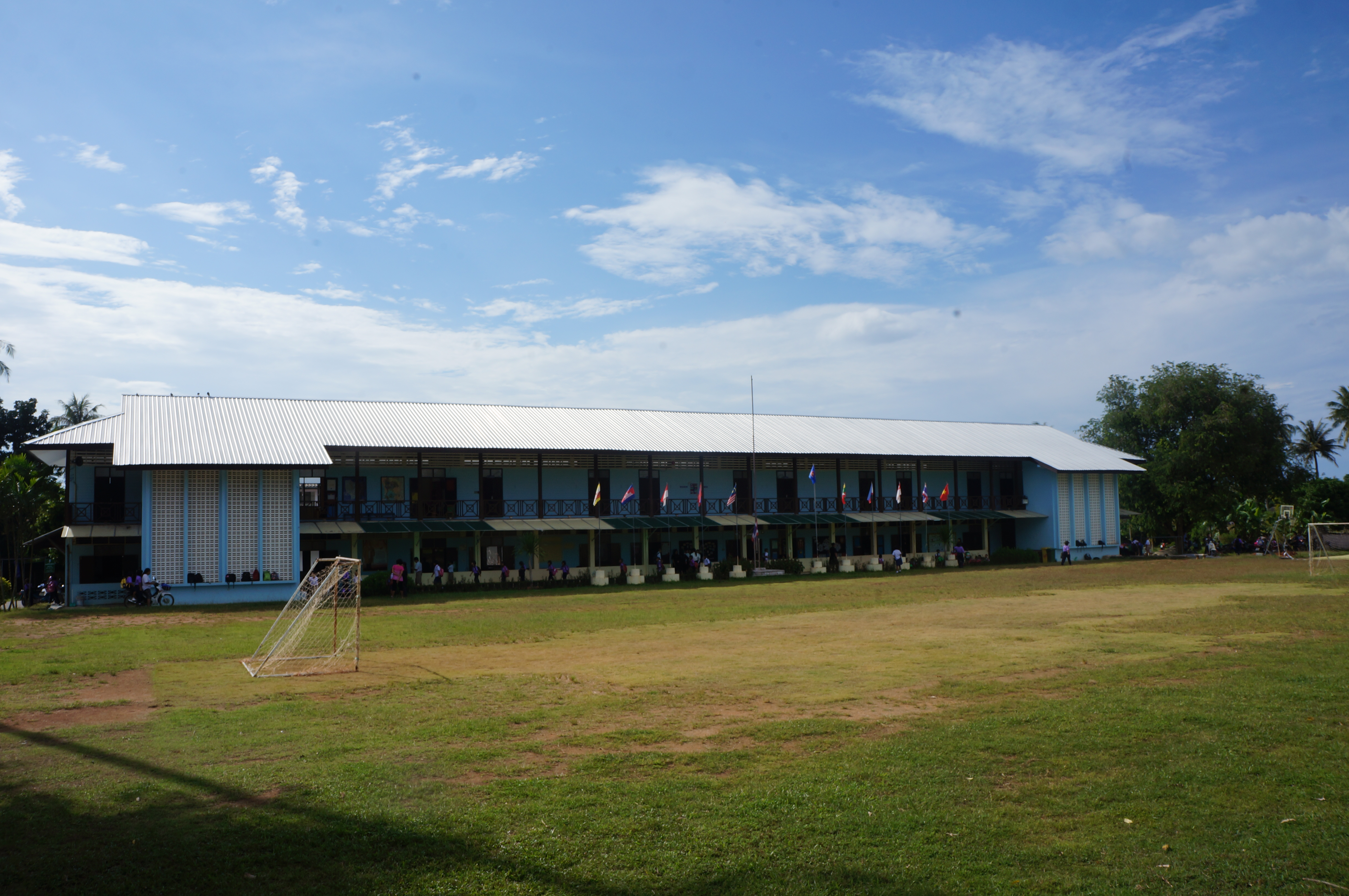
Ban Mai Khao Elementary School, Mai Khao, Phuket

Basic education in Thailand is divided into three levels: pre-primary, primary, and secondary. Pre-primary education was introduced in 2004 and made free in 2009. State schools offer two years of kindergarten (Thai: อนุบาล; RTGS: anuban) (three- and four-year-old) and one year of pre-school studies (five-year-old). Participation in pre-primary education is "nearly universal". At the age of six, education begins. It lasts for nine years, consisting of primary, prathom (Thai: ประถม) (grades P1-6), and lower secondary, matthayom ton (Thai: มัธยมต้น) (grades M1-3), starting at the age of 12. Upper secondary education, "matthayom plai" (Thai: มัธยมปลาย) grades M4-6, is also not compulsory. It is divided into general and vocational tracks.

Ninety-nine per cent of students complete primary education. Only 85 per cent complete lower secondary. About 75 per cent move on to upper secondary (ages 16–18). For every 100 students in primary schools, 85.6 students will continue studies in M1, 79.6 students will continue until M3, and only 54.8 will go on to M6 or occupational schools.

There are academic upper secondary schools, vocational upper secondary schools, and comprehensive schools offering academic and vocational tracks. Students who choose the academic stream usually intend to enter a university. Vocational schools offer programs that prepare students for employment or further studies.

Admission to an upper secondary school is through an entrance exam. On the completion of each level, students need to pass the NET (National Educational Test) to graduate. Children are required to attend six years of elementary school and at least the first three years of high school. Those who graduate from the sixth year of high school are candidates for two tests: O-NET (Ordinary National Educational Test) and A-NET (Advanced National Educational Test).

Public schools are administered by the government. The private sector includes schools run for profit and fee-paying non-profit schools which are often run by charitable organisations — especially by Catholic diocesan and religious orders that operate over 143 large elementary/secondary schools throughout the country. Village and sub-district schools usually provide pre-school kindergarten and elementary classes, while in the district towns, schools will serve their areas with comprehensive schools with all the classes from kindergarten to age 15 and separate secondary schools for ages 13 through 18.

Due to budgetary limitations, rural schools are generally less well equipped than the schools in the cities. The standard of instruction, particularly for the English language, is generally lower than in urban schools.

The school year is divided into two semesters. Usually Schools start their academic terms midway through the year. For Public Schools the first semester begins in mid May and ends around late September or early October; the second begins around late October or early November and ends around late February or early March. There are approximately 12 weeks of holiday per academic year. For Private Schools the first semester starts in August and ends in December. The second term starts in January and ends in July. Some International Schools follow English school holidays (Usually August to July, but divided over three terms).

Stages in the Thai formal education system
Typical age	Stage		Level/Grade		Notes
3	Basic education	Early childhood (Kindergarten)	Variable (Typically Anuban 1–3)		
4	Basic education	Early childhood (Kindergarten)	Variable (Typically Anuban 1–3)		
5	Basic education	Early childhood (Kindergarten)	Variable (Typically Anuban 1–3)		
6	Basic education	Elementary	Prathom 1		
7	Basic education	Elementary	Prathom 2		
8	Basic education	Elementary	Prathom 3		
9	Basic education	Elementary	Prathom 4		
10	Basic education	Elementary	Prathom 5		
11	Basic education	Elementary	Prathom 6		
12	Basic education	Lower-secondary	Matthayom 1		
13	Basic education	Lower-secondary	Matthayom 2		
14	Basic education	Lower-secondary	Matthayom 3		
	Basic education	Upper-secondary	General	Vocational	
15	Basic education	Upper-secondary	Matthayom 4	Vocational Certificate (3 years)	
16	Basic education	Upper-secondary	Matthayom 5	Vocational Certificate (3 years)	
17	Basic education	Upper-secondary	Matthayom 6	Vocational Certificate (3 years)	
⋮	Higher education		Variable		

== History ==
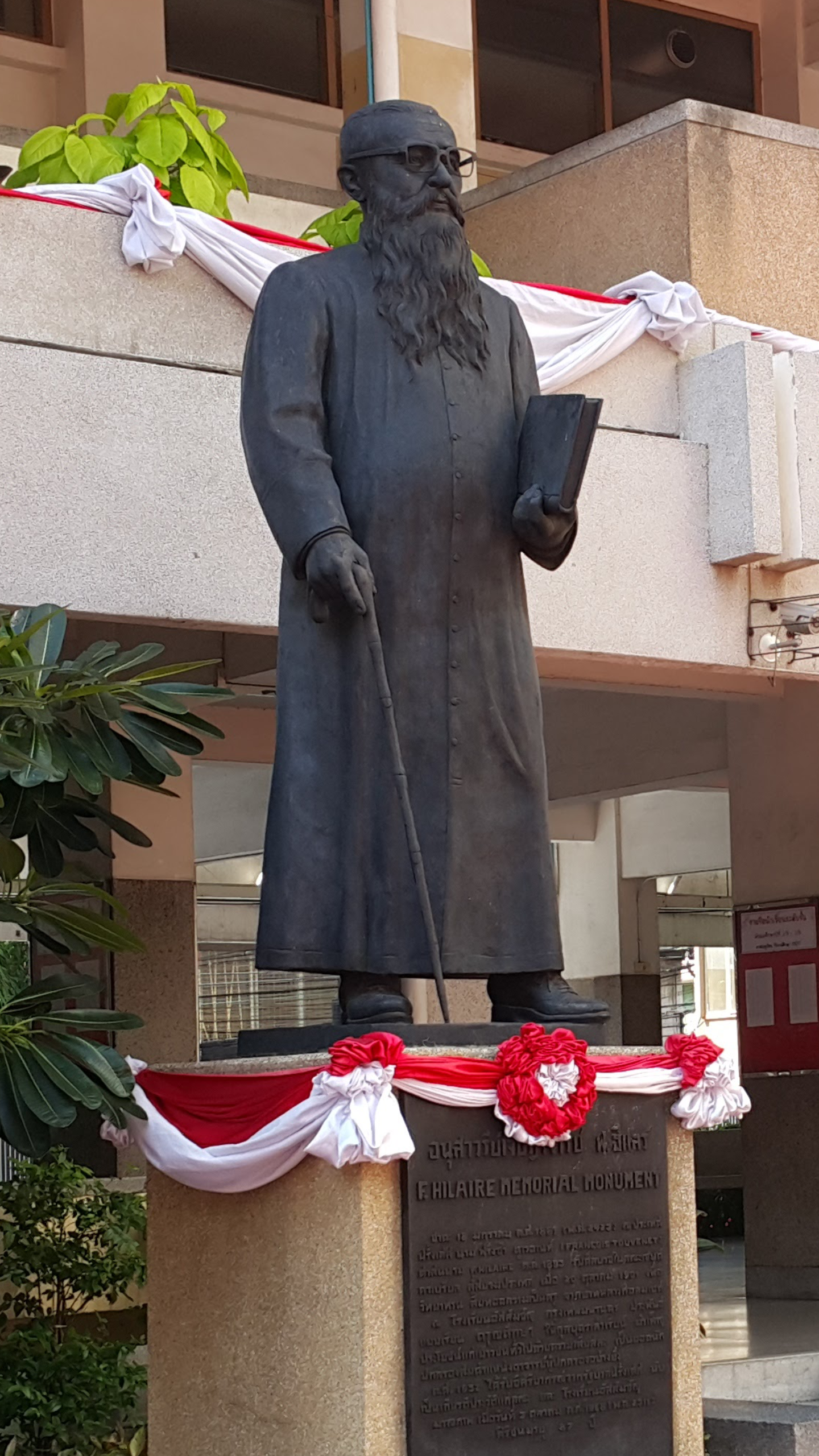
Sculpture of F. Hilaire, a French missionary who pioneered Thai textbook writing

Formal education has its early origins in the temple schools, when it was available to boys only. From the mid-sixteenth century Thailand opened up to significant French Catholic influence until the mid-seventeenth century when it was heavily curtailed, and the country returned to a strengthening of its own cultural ideology. Unlike other parts of South and Southeast Asia, particularly the Indian subcontinent, Myanmar (Burma), Laos, Vietnam, Cambodia, the Malay Peninsula, Indonesia and the Philippines, Thailand has never been colonised by a Western power. As a result, structured education on the lines of that in developed countries gained new impetus with the reemergence of diplomacy in the late nineteenth century.

=== Early education ===
It is possible that one of the earliest forms of education began when King Ramkhamhaeng the Great invented the Thai alphabet in 1283 basing it on Mon, Khmer, and southern Indian scripts. Stone inscriptions from 1292 in the new script depict moral, intellectual and cultural aspects. During the Sukhothai period (1238–1378), education was dispensed by the Royal Institution of Instruction (Rajabundit) to members of the royal family and the nobility, while commoners were taught by Buddhist monks.

In the period of the Ayutthaya kingdom from 1350 to 1767 during the reign of King Narai the Great (1656–1688), the Chindamani, generally accepted as the first textbook of the Thai language, collating the grammar. The prosody of Thai language and official forms of correspondence was written by a royal astrologer named Pra Horatibodi, in order to stem the foreign educational influence of the French Jesuit schools It remained in use up to King Chulalongkorn's reign (1868–1910). Narai himself was a poet, and his court became the center where poets congregated to compose verses and poems. Although through his influence interest in Thai literature was significantly increased, Catholic missions had been present with education in Ayutthaya as early as 1567 under Portuguese Dominicans and French Jesuits were given permission to settle in Ayutthaya in 1662. His reign therefore saw major developments in diplomatic missions to and from Western powers.

On Narai's death, fearing further foreign interference in Thai education and culture, and conversion to Catholicism, xenophobic sentiments at court increased and diplomatic activities were severely reduced and ties with the West and any forms of Western education were practically severed. They did not recover their former levels until the reign of King Mongkut in the mid-nineteenth century.

=== Development ===
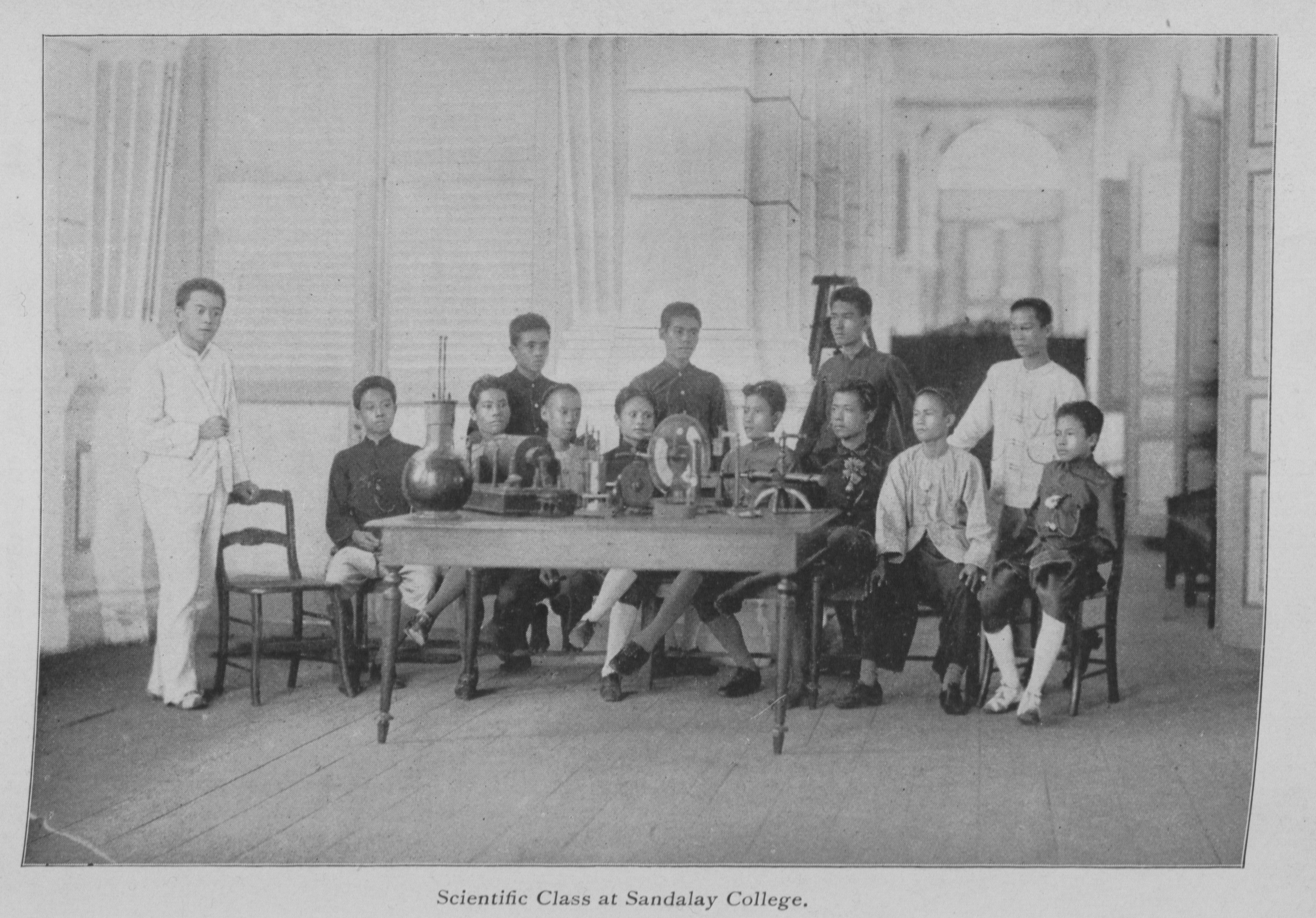
Scientific Class at Sandalay College in Bangkok 1892

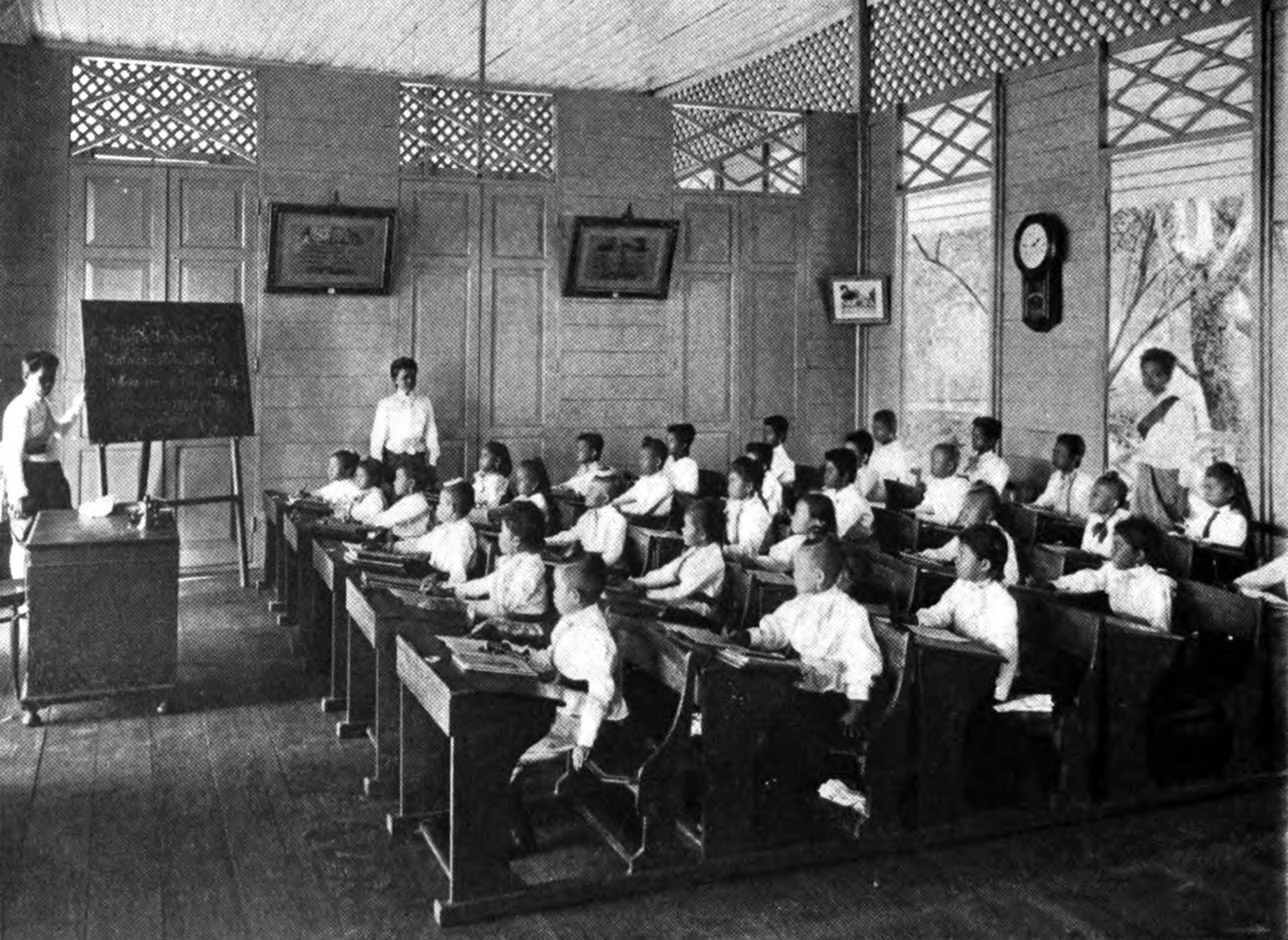
School for girls in Siam, 1904

Through his reforms of the Buddhist Sangha, King Rama I (1782–1809), accelerated the development of public education and during the reign of King Rama IV (1851–1865) the printing press arrived in Thailand making books available in the Thai language for the first time; English had become the lingua franca of the Far East, and the education provided by the monks was proving inadequate for government officials. Rama IV decreed that measures be taken to modernise education and insisted that English would be included in the curriculum.

King Rama V (1868–1910) continued to influence the development of education and in 1871 the first relatively modern concept of a school with purpose constructed building, lay teachers and a time-table was opened in the palace to teach male members of the royal family and the sons of the nobility. The Command Declaration on Schooling was proclaimed, English was being taught in the palace for royalty and nobles, and schools were set up outside the palace for the education of commoners’ children. With the aid of foreign - mainly English - advisers a Department of Education was established by the king in 1887 by which time 34 schools, with over 80 teachers and almost 2,000 students, were in operation and as part of the king’s programme to establish ministries, in 1892 the department became the Ministry of Education. Recognizing that the private sector had come to share the tasks of providing education, the government introduced controls for private schools.

In 1897 on the initiative of Queen Sribajarindra, girls were admitted into the educational system. In 1898, a two-part education plan for Bangkok and for the provinces was launched with programmes for pre-school, elementary, secondary, technical, and higher education. In 1901, the first government school for girls, the Bamrung Wijasatri, was set up in Bangkok, and in 1913, the first teacher training school for women was set up at the Benchama Rajalai School for girls. Further developments took place when in 1902 the plan was remodeled by National System of Education in Siam into the two categories of general education, and professional/ technical education, imposing at the same time age limits for admission to encourage graduation within predetermined time scales.

The first Thai university, Chulalongkorn, was named after King Chulalongkorn (Rama V). It was established by his son and successor King Vajiravudh (Rama VI) in 1917 by combining the Royal Pages School and the College of Medicine. In 1921, the Compulsory Elementary Education Act was proclaimed.

=== Education for Sustainable Development ===
Thailand has a particular interpretation of education for sustainable development ESD as the ‘philosophy of sufficiency economy’ has played a leading role in shaping policy, including the National Economic and Social Development Plan and the National Education Act. ESD is highly integrated into the curriculum of primary and secondary education in Thailand through the framework of sufficiency economy. The National Curriculum of Thailand, which integrates the country’s ‘philosophy of sufficiency economy’, is an important case in point. Since 2002, the country’s education plan has promoted the inclusion of ESD in five distinct ways. First, ESD topics and content are incorporated into the eight main subject areas of the curriculum, with ESD learning standards defined in a scaffolded manner for each subject area. Second, student character development is defined by eight characteristics including active learning, sufficiency lifestyle and public mindedness. Third, the plan aims to provide specific project-based learning activities, such as natural preservation and environmental clubs and camps. Fourth, ESD-specific learning modules are developed and incorporated, such as renewable energy or the philosophy of sufficiency economy. Fifth, following structural reforms in 2008, Thailand now has a 30 per cent inclusion rate across the entire curriculum for decentralized, locally based subjects and teaching. These should address topics pertinent to the local context and often include issues relating to sustainable lifestyles and the sufficiency economy.

=== Twelve values ===
Prayut Chan-o-cha, Thailand's prime minister and junta leader, said in 2017 that school reform was urgently needed. Following the military takeover of May 2014, Prayut, in a televised broadcast in July, ordered schools to display a list of 12 "Thai" values he composed. They are:

1. Loyalty to the Nation, a Religion, and the Monarchy
2. Honesty, sacrifice, endurance, and noble ideology for the greater good
3. Gratitude for parents, guardians, and teachers
4. Diligence in acquiring knowledge, via school studies and other methods
5. Preserving the Thai customs and tradition
6. Morality and good will toward others
7. Correct understanding of democracy with the King as Head of State
8. Discipline, respect for law, and obedience to the older citizens
9. Constant consciousness to practice good deeds all the time, as taught by His Majesty the King
10. Practice of Self-Sufficient Economy in accordance with the teaching of His Majesty the King
11. Physical and mental strength. Refusal to surrender to religious sins.
12. Uphold the interest of the nation over oneself.

Authorities instructed public schools and state agencies to hang a banner listing Gen Prayut's teachings on their premises. State agencies have also produced a poem, song, and 12-part film based on the teachings. In late-December 2014, the Ministry of Information, Communication, and Telecommunications (MICT) released a set of "stickers" depicting each of the Twelve Values for users of the chat application LINE.

=== Military training for kindergartners ===
The military government under Prayut Chan-o-cha instituted a "land defender battalion" program to teach uniformed children aged four and five to do push-ups, crawl under netting, salute, and eat from metal trays on the floor. "Soldiers showed children military operations and taught them patriotic values to love the nation, religions, and the Thai monarchy through the...12 Thai Values," according to the Thai-language news outlet Matichon Online. The news site reported that this is the second time that the Royal Thai Army has run the program, and said that many more schools and kindergartens will join the program in the future.

=== 2015 IQ survey results ===
A 2015 survey by the Ministry of Public Health found the average IQ of Thai students to be 93, down from 94 in 2011, and below the international standard of 100.

One cause of lower IQs might be nutrition, specifically iodine deficiency.

In July 2015, the Thai Department of Health initiated a program to provide better nutrition and health education at Thai public schools. Its aims are to increase average IQ from 94 to 100 and boost the average height of children. Currently boys measure on average 167 cm and girls 157 cm. Over the 10-year life of the program heights are targeted to increase to 175 cm and 165 cm respectively. Children at schools across the country will receive healthier meals and more instruction on healthy living and exercise.

In 2015, a World Bank study concluded that "...one-third of 15-year-old Thais are 'functionally illiterate'", including almost half of those studying in rural schools. The bank suggested that Thailand reform its education system partly through merging and optimising its more than 20,000 schools nationwide. The alternative is hiring 160,000 more teachers for up-country schools in order to match Bangkok's teacher-student ratios. The Economist notes that, "Thailand's dismal performance is not dramatically out of step with countries of similar incomes. But it is strange given its unusually generous spending on education, which in some years has hoovered up more than a quarter of the budget. Rote learning is common. There is a shortage of maths and science teachers, but a surfeit of physical-education instructors. Many head teachers lack the authority to hire or fire their own staff."

=== Secondary school admissions protest ===
In May 2012, parents and students at the prestigious Bodindecha (Sing Singhaseni) School, commonly referred to as "Bodin", in Bangkok staged a hunger strike to protest what they viewed as admissions irregularities. The issue arose when 200 Bodin students were denied the right to continue their studies at the school at the end of the 2011 school year. The students suspected that school executives had taken away their seats to give to children of parents willing to pay huge sums of "tea money" or bribes. Admission to popular schools can cost "tea money" sums up to seven figures. The greater the competition, the higher the amount of donations the parents believe they have to offer in exchange for their children's chances to get a good education at a quality school.

=== Status of teachers ===
Thai society holds teachers in high regard as evidenced by naming one day of the year as "Teacher's Day." "Thai teachers, as well as university lecturers, are not as well paid as their colleagues in Malaysia or Singapore, not to mention those in the United States or Europe," according to the Bangkok Post. This has led to the finding that each Thai teacher may be up to three million baht in debt. The government is taking steps to ameliorate the plight of teachers by refinancing loans owed to institutional lenders.

== Organisation ==
=== Administration ===
Thailand has had 21 education ministers in the past 18 years (2000–2018). Each lasts an average of nine months. The complexity of administration of Thai education gives rise to duplication among the many ministries and agencies providing education and establishing of standards. In 1980, at the recommendation of the Minister of Education, Dr. Sippanondha Ketudat, responsibility for basic elementary education was moved from the Ministry of Interior to the Ministry of Education. Both the Ministry of University Affairs and the Ministry of Education have been actively involved in teacher training.

In 2003, Thailand was organized into Education Service Areas. There are both primary educational service areas and secondary educational service areas.

=== Budget ===
For FY2019 the budget of the Ministry of Education is 487,646 million baht. The Thai national budget allocates considerable resources to education. In FY2017, educational expenditures represented almost 20 per cent of the national budget, or four per cent of GDP. This is high in comparison with the educational expenditures of other countries, especially developing countries, with China at 13 per cent, Indonesia 8.1 per cent, Malaysia 20 per cent, Mexico, 24.3 per cent, Philippines 17 per cent, the United Kingdom and France, 11 per cent. Although education is mainly financed by the national budget, local funds, particularly in urban areas, are spent on education. In the area governed by the Bangkok Metropolitan Administration (BMA), up to 28.1 per cent of the educational budget has been provided by local financing. Loans and technical assistance for education are also received from Asian Development Bank, and the World Bank.

== Elementary and secondary levels ==
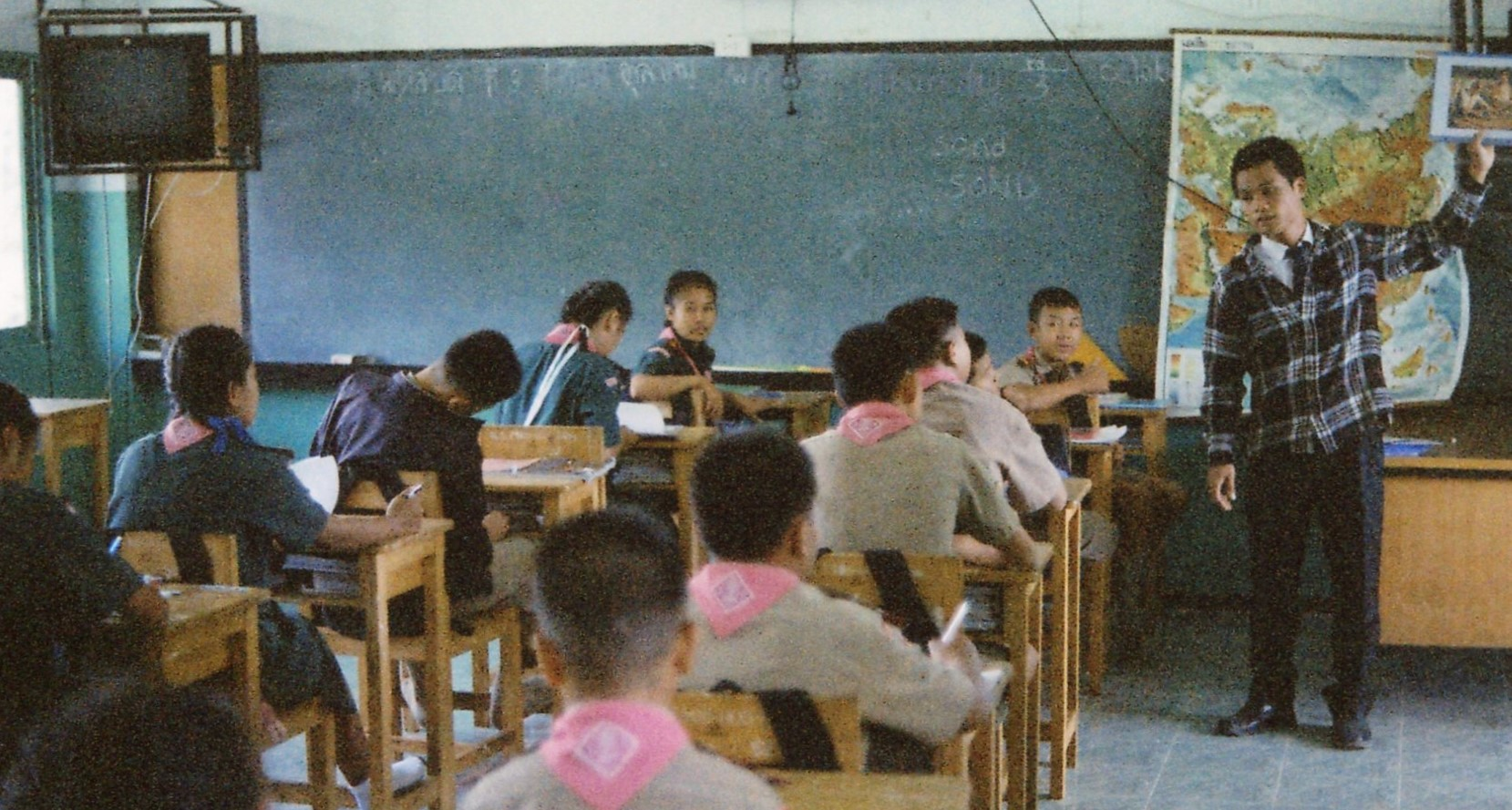
An English lesson in a school in rural Thailand

At elementary levels, students study eight core subjects each semester: Thai language, mathematics, science, social science, health and physical education, arts and music, technology, and foreign languages. At age 16 (Matthayom 4), students are allowed to choose one or two elective courses. The science program (Wit-Kanit) and the mathematics-English language program (Sil-Kamnuan) are among the most popular. Foreign language programs (Sil-Phasa) in (Chinese, French, Japanese, Korean, Russian, Spanish, and German) for example, and the social science program (sometimes called the general program) are also offered. Both elementary and secondary levels have special programs, the English Program and the Gifted Program. In the English Program students learn every subject in English except for Thai and social studies. The Gifted Program is mathematics-science focused.

Grade of enrollment for immigrant students is determined by their birthday. In a study about Thailand's education policy on children of migrants, Thai schools often required migrant students to be proficient in the Thai language and to have gone through a learning center before enrolling into a public school. If a student was younger than 7, they would be placed in kindergarten, and if they were older, they would be placed in a first grade class. Therefore, students that were 15 could still enroll as a first grader. The purpose for these methods was to ensure that migrant students were better prepared to start school, but it did cause some issues for both the student and the teachers. The study found that even though older students placed in first grade classrooms were more obedient, the students had trouble connecting with their classmates and teacher had to address them differently due to their age. Thai public schools attempted to address this issue by some implementing a rule that a student could not be older than 9 to enroll, but this led to learning centers not given recommendations to public school for older students.

== Vocational education ==
The Vocational Education Commission manages 416 vocational institutions of higher learning in Thailand.

Technical and vocational education (TVE) begins at the senior high school level where students begin to follow either general or vocational education tracks. At present, around 60 per cent of students follow the general education programmes. However, the government is endeavouring to achieve an equal balance between general and vocational education.

Three levels of TVE are offered: the Certificate in Vocational Education (Por Wor Chor) which is taken during the upper secondary period; the Technical Diploma (Por Wor Sor), taken after school-leaving age; and the Higher Diploma on which admission to university for a bachelor's degree programme may be granted. Vocational education is also provided by private institutions.

In 2016, Thailand's first technical vocational education and training (TVET) hub started in the northern province of Chiang Mai. TVET is a model that provides knowledge and skills required for workplaces, using formal, non-formal and informal learning.

=== Dual vocational training (DVT) ===
Essential to DVT is the active participation of the private sector. In 1995, the Department of Vocational Education launched an initiative to introduce dual vocational training programmes which involve the students in hand-on training at selected organisations in the private sector.

DVT is a regular element of the DoVE "certificate" and "diploma" program. The training is for a period of three years with more than half of the time devoted to practical training on-the-job, spread over two days a week, or for longer periods depending on the distance, throughout the semesters.

Two levels of DVT are offered: the three-year certificate level for skilled workers where students and trainees are admitted at the age of 15 after completing Matthayom 3 (Grade 9); and the two-year diploma technician level for students who have graduated with the Certificate of Vocational Education after 12 years of formal education.

In the scheme, vocational, unlike regular internships, where students may be assigned to work on unpaid irrelevant jobs, the cooperative education programme enables students of the vocational schools to do field work while benefiting from an allowance to cover living expenses or free accommodation, and compensation for their contributions made to the company's income and profits as temporary employees.

Schools collaborate directly with the private sector in drafting action plans and setting goals for students to meet. Generally, the company will offer permanent employment to the trainees on graduation and successful completion of the programme. Conversely, companies that recruit trainees from among young people who have completed a minimum of nine years at school may enroll their employees with a technical or vocational college where they are taught vocational subjects as the theoretical background to the occupational field in which they are being trained.

=== Enrollment ===
As of 2015 there were 674,113 students enrolled in vocational education courses.

=== Concerns of multi-national corporations ===
Shiro Sadoshima, the Japanese ambassador to Thailand, believes that the Thai government must invest more in education to produce a labour force that can meet the demands of Japanese industry. He noted that while Thailand has a policy to improve vocational skills and cultivate skilled labour, the skills exhibited by Thai workers are not up to Japanese standards. The ambassador's remarks echoed those of major Japanese manufacturers such as Toyota, which has been investing in Thailand for decades. Shuichi Ikeda, chief representative of the Japan International Cooperation Agency (JICA), also voiced concerns that even though Thailand has produced a lot of vocational graduates to serve rising demand for factory workers, those graduates lack required skills. Thailand is expected to produce around 67,000 vocational graduates over the next 10 years but only around 3,100 of them can meet labour standards and get a job, he said.

== National Educational Tests ==
The National Educational Tests are tests developed by the National Institute of Educational Testing Service (NIETS) which used to also organise university admission tests such as GAT, PAT, and the General Subject Tests. The National Educational Tests include:

- Ordinary National Educational Test (O-NET)
- Buddhism National Educational Test (B-NET)
- Islamic National Educational Test (I-NET)
- Non-Formal National Educational Test (N-NET)
- Vocational National Educational Test (V-NET)

The O-NET used to be mandatory for Secondary 6 students and used in university admissions but as of 2022, the O-NET is optional and not used in university admissions.

== Higher education ==
=== Universities ===
There are 170 institutions of higher education in Thailand, both public and private, offering 4,100 curricula. For the 2015 academic year, the universities could accommodate 156,216 new students, but only 105,046 applied to take entrance exams. Exacerbating the student shortfall, the National Economic and Social Development Board projects that the number of Thais in the school-age group 0–21 years will fall to 20 per cent of the population by 2040, a drop from 62.3 per cent in 1980.

Many public universities receive financial support from the government for research purposes. Over half of the provinces have a government-run Rajabhat University (formerly Rajabhat Institutes) and Rajamangala University of Technology, which were traditionally teacher-training colleges.

Thai universities do not score highly in the Quacquarelli Symonds (QS) World University rankings and they are losing ground when compared with other Asian universities. Thailand's top three universities, Chulalongkorn, Mahidol, and Thammasat, are trending down. When it was first ranked by QS, Chulalongkorn came in at 201. In 2018 it was ranked 271. Several years ago, Mahidol was ranked 255 but now is ranked 380. Thammasat in 2012 was ranked 561 but has consistently been in the 600s since then.

Some of Thailand's leading universities include:

- Burapha University: First higher education institution in eastern Thailand's industrial region. Offering a taught course in arts and humanities, business administration, engineering, education, health sciences, science, social sciences, logistics, and tourism.
- Chiang Mai University: The first institution of higher education in northern Thailand and the first provincial university in the country, offering programs in arts and humanities, health sciences, science and technology, and social sciences.
- Chulalongkorn University: is a comprehensive and research-intensive university and the oldest institute of higher education in Thailand, offering programs in arts and humanities, engineering and technology, life sciences and medicine, natural sciences, social sciences, and management.
- Kasetsart University: Initially established as an agricultural college, it later expanded its subject area to cover a wide range of academic disciplines. It currently offers programs in agriculture, agro-industry, business administration, economics, education, engineering, environmental science, fisheries, forestry, humanities, science, social sciences, veterinary medicine, and veterinary technology.
- Khon Kaen University: First university in northeastern Thailand. Engineering, education, college of local administration.
- King Mongkut's University of Technology Thonburi: Best known for programs in civil engineering, electrical engineering, mechanical engineering, production engineering, energy technology and architecture.
- King Mongkut's Institute of Technology Ladkrabang: Best known for programs in telecommunications engineering, electrical engineering, computer engineering, control engineering, and architecture.
- King Mongkut's University of Technology North Bangkok: Jointly founded in 1959 by the Thai Government and the Federal Republic of Germany. Offering a specialized course in science, engineering and industrial technology.
- Mahidol University: Medicine (Siriraj Hospital and Ramathibodi Hospital), pharmacy, veterinary science, medical technology, health sciences
- Prince of Songkla University: First university in southern Thailand. Natural resources, tourism and hospitality, management sciences.
- Silpakorn University: Began as a fine arts university and now includes many other faculties as well.
- Srinakharinwirot University: Education, dentistry, social sciences, and humanities.
- Thammasat University: Established as a specialization and open university in Law, Business, Political Sciences, and Economics before expanded fields to become a national university. Nowadays, offers programs which covered all of social science and humanities, science and technology, and health sciences.

=== Programs ===
Most bachelor's degree courses are four year, full-time programs. Exceptions are education and architecture that require five years, and the doctor of dental surgery, medicine, pharmacy, and veterinary medicine that require six years of study. Master's degree programs last for either one or two years and the degree is conferred on course credits with either a thesis or a final exam. On completion of a master's degree, students may apply for an admission exam to a two to five year doctoral program. The doctorate is conferred upon completion of coursework, research, and the successful submission of a dissertation. There are at least 1,000 PhD programs offered at 33 Thai universities. The number of PhD students rose to over 25,000 in 2015, up from just 1,380 in 2008.

=== Admissions ===
At present, Thai university admissions are done through the "Thai University Central Admission System" or TCAS, a central admissions system developed by the Council of University Presidents of Thailand (CUPT). This system includes four rounds of admissions: portfolio admissions, quota admissions, joint admissions, and direct admissions.

==== Round 1: Portfolio admissions ====
Universities accepting students in this round have a lot of freedom in setting admission requirements but generally look at the extracurricular activities and achievements of a student, so a portfolio containing the student's basic information along with their extracurricular activities and achievements is expected by most universities. However, some programmes (especially international programmes) will also accept and use international standardised examinations in consideration such as the SAT, IELTS, BMAT, etc.

==== Round 2: Quota admissions ====
This round of admissions is intended to provide more opportunities in education for students in areas outside of Bangkok, the capital. This round is similar to round 1 in that programmes accepting students in this round have freedom in setting their requirements. However, scores such as the TGAT, TPAT, and A-Level Tests are usually required.

==== Round 3: Joint admissions ====
In this round, universities accept students with exam scores of TGAT, TPAT, and A-Level tests. Round 3 admissions are handled by the CUPT rather than the universities.

==== Round 4: Direct admissions ====
In round 4, universities have total freedom in setting their requirements and criteria. Universities can require scores in TGAT, TPAT, A-Level tests, or other exams such as the SAT, and IELTS. They can also require the student's portfolio and set requirements of the student's area of origin.

==== Admissions exams ====
The standardised exams universities generally accepted are as follows:

===== Thai General Aptitude Test or TGAT (replacing GAT in 2023) =====
The TGAT is divided into three sections:

- English communication
- Critical and Logical Thinking
- Future workforce competency

===== Thai Professional Aptitude Tests or TPAT (replacing PAT in 2023) =====
Presently, there are TPATs for five fields: medicine; liberal arts; science, technology, and engineering; architecture; and education.

- TPAT 1: Medical Aptitude Test (developed by the consortium of Thai medical schools)
- TPAT 2: Liberal arts Aptitude Test
- TPAT 3: Scientific, technological, and engineering Aptitude Test
- TPAT 4: Architecture Aptitude Test
- TPAT 5: Teaching and educational Aptitude Test

===== Applied Knowledge Level test or A-Level (replacing General Subject Tests in 2023) =====
These exams are intended to test a student's knowledge of each subject and his/her ability to apply that knowledge. The A-Level include:

- Thai
- Social studies
- English
- Other foreign languages (replacing PAT 7 in 2023)
  - French
  - German
  - Japanese
  - Chinese
  - Arabic
  - Pali
  - Korean
- Applied science
- Applied mathematics 1: Fundamental and Additional mathematics
- Applied mathematics 2: Fundamental mathematics
- Biology
- Chemistry
- Physics

== International schools ==
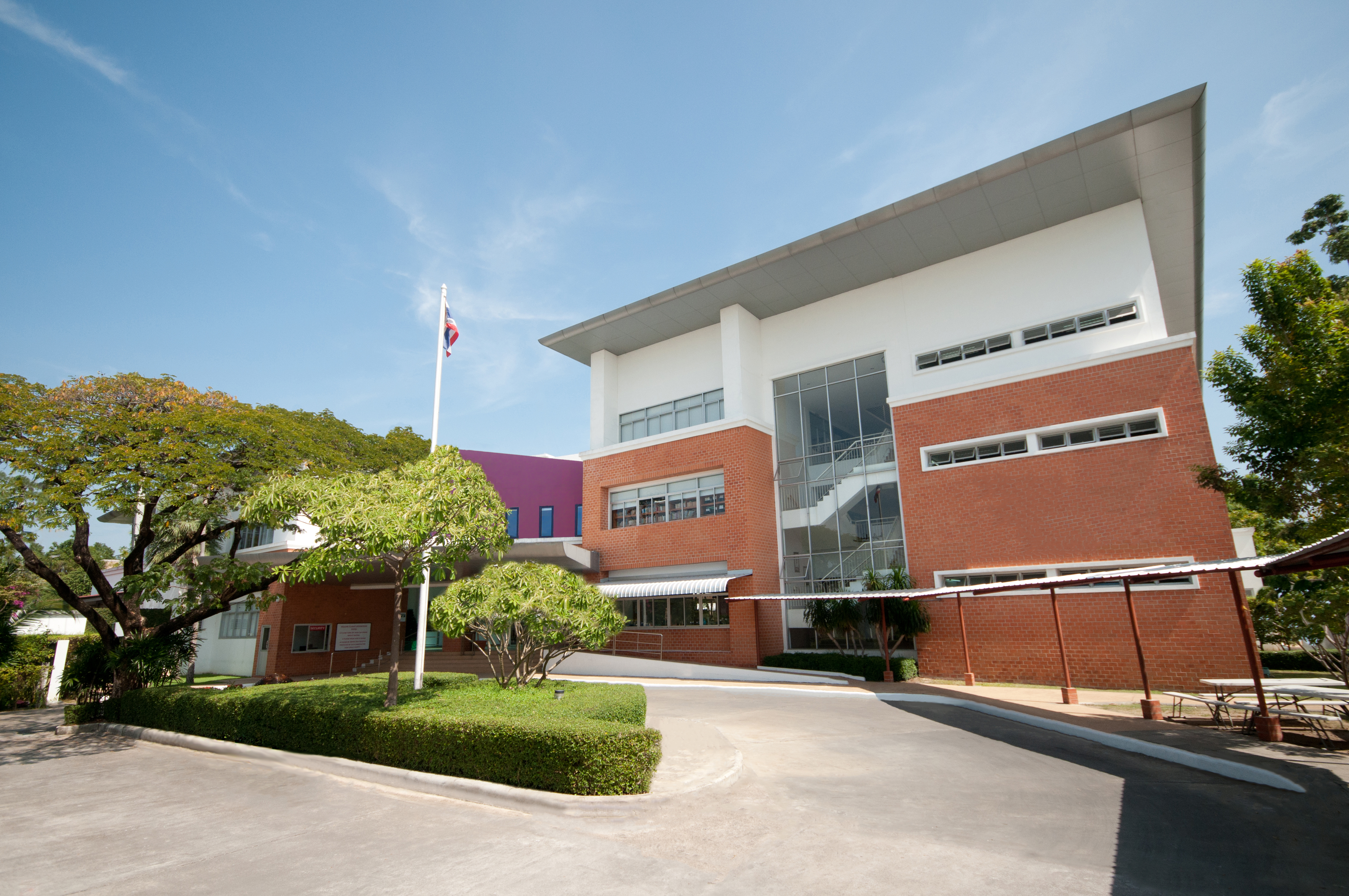
Ascot International School, Bangkok

The ministry of education defines international schools as, "...an educational institution providing an international curriculum or international curriculum which its subject's detail has been adjusted or a self-organised curriculum, which is not the Ministry of Education's. A foreign language is used as the medium of teaching and learning and students are enrolled without restriction or limitation on nationality or religion or government regime, and are not against the morality or stability of Thailand."

Prior to 1992, only a very small number of international schools existed in Thailand, and they catered entirely to the children of expatriates, as Thai law prohibited Thai nationals from enrolling. When the first international school, International School Bangkok, relocated to a new campus outside of the city proper, a group of parents worked with United Nations staff to lobby the Ministry of Education to change this law and open the first new international school in decades. This led to the establishment of New International School of Thailand (later changed to NIST International School), and the repeal of the prohibition against the enrollment of Thais. Due to the high demand for private international education, this change also sparked the opening of dozens of other international schools in subsequent years.

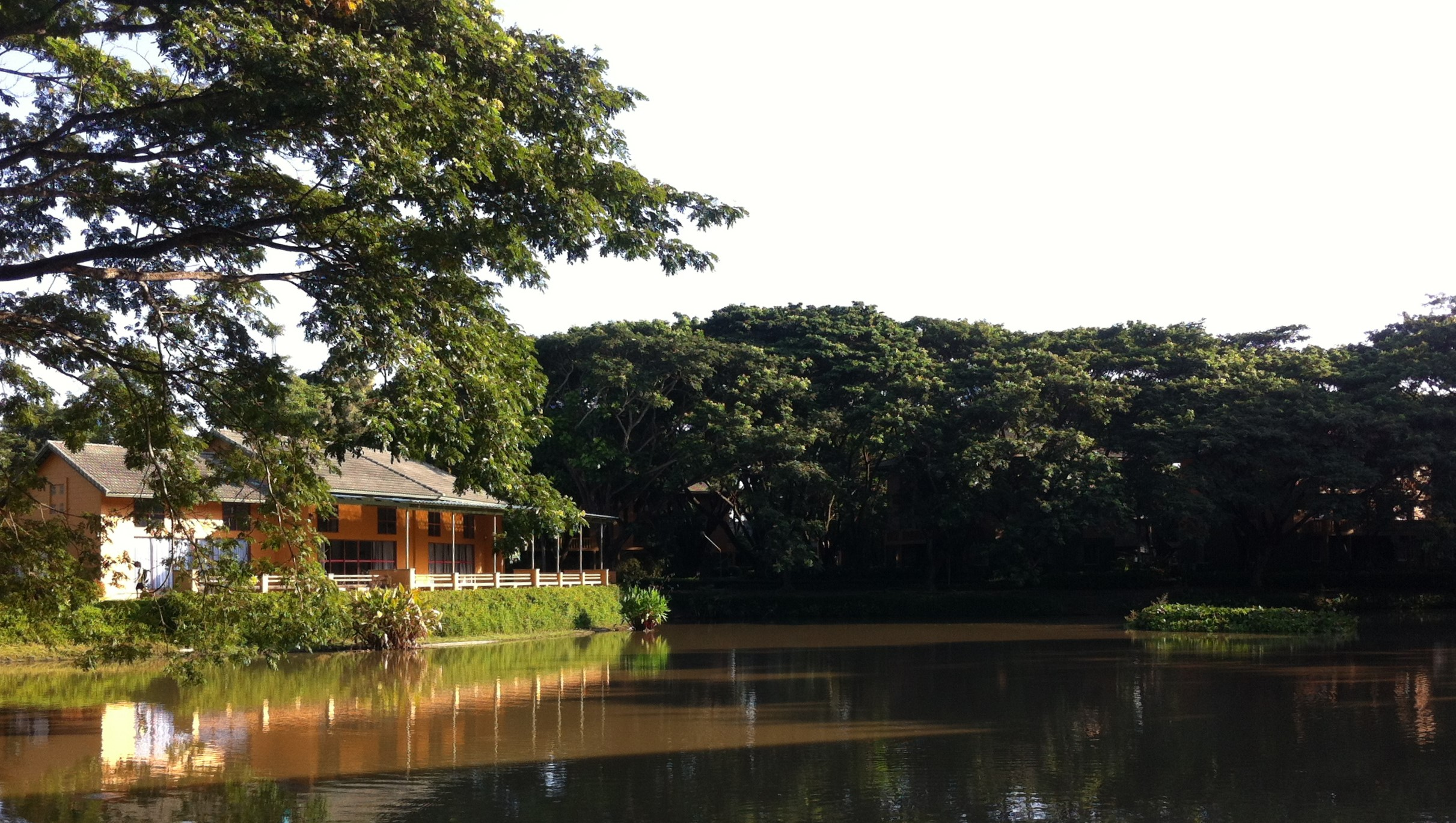
Prem Tinsulanonda International School, Chiang Mai

The curriculum is required to be approved by the Ministry of Education and may be an international one, an international curriculum with modifications, or a curriculum established by the school itself. Thai language and culture constitutes a core subject and is mandatory at every level for all Thai students registered as Thai nationals. Thai nationals must study Thai for five 50-minute lessons per week, while non-Thai citizens are required to study Thai language and culture for one 50-minute lesson per week. International schools must operate within a framework of requirements and conditions established by the Ministry of Education, that stipulates the ownership, location and size of the plot, design and structure of buildings, ratio of students to classroom surface, sanitary installations, administration and educational support facilities such as libraries and resources centres. Within one year from their commencement, elementary and secondary schools must apply accreditation from an international organisation recognised and accepted by the Office of the Private Education Commission and accreditation must be granted within six years. The license holder, Manager and Thai Director must be of Thai nationality though frequently there will also be a foreign headteacher to oversee the international curriculum and implement school policy.

Approximately 90 international schools operate in Thailand, of which about two-thirds are in the Bangkok area.

== Distance learning by TV ==
Established in 1996, DLTV (Distance Learning via TV) broadcasts 15 educational channels from Klai Kangwon Palace School, Hua Hin. It broadcasts via the Ku-band beam on the Thaicom 5 satellite to 17,000 schools and other subscribers across the country. In December 2008, Thaicom Public Company, the operator of the Thaicom satellite, announced it has renewed a 10-year contract with the Distance Learning Education via Satellite Foundation of Thailand (DLF) to broadcast DLTV channels using one Ku-band transponder on the Thaicom 5 satellite.

On 13 May 2020, The National Broadcasting and Telecommunications Commission's (NBTC) board approved the sequencing of 17 new digital TV channels for education run by the Education Ministry, channels 37-53, along with Thai PBS TV station using a frequency band to run an active learning TV programme on channel 4. These were planned to run on a temporary basis starting on 1 July 2020 and lasting for six months.

== Teacher development and performance ==
In recent years, the number of fresh graduates from teacher-training schools has ranged from 50,000 to 60,000 annually, raising concerns about quality and oversupply. The government is trying to reduce the number of graduates from teacher-education programmes to no more than 25,000 a year and direct those graduates to underserved localities. "We need to focus on quality, not quantity," a spokesperson said. In September 2015, the Office of the Higher Education Commission (OHEC) put forward an initiative to provide 58,000 grants to student-teachers over a 15-year period. The bulk of the grants would go to those who would be sent to work in areas with a shortage of teachers.

In 2010 the Office of the Basic Education Commission (OBEC), for the first time, tested secondary schools teachers on the subjects they teach. A grade of less than 59 per cent was considered to exhibit a low standard of knowledge. OBEC said up to 88 per cent of 3,973 computer science teachers failed the test. The same was true in biology (86 per cent of 2,846), math (84 per cent of 5,498), physics (71 per cent of 3,487), chemistry (64 per cent of 3,088) and astronomy and earth sciences (63 per cent of 529). Teachers at the junior high level earned higher marks. OBEC said 58 per cent of 14,816 teachers teaching math had marks of more than 80 per cent, while 54 per cent of 13,385 teachers did well in sciences. School directors did not fare well: about 95 per cent failed tests in information and computer technology and English.

Elementary and secondary school teachers do not enjoy the same long breaks as the students and are required to work through the vacations on administrative duties. They are also burdened with administrative tasks: a study by the Quality Learning Foundation found that Thai teachers spent 84 of the 200-day academic year performing non-teaching tasks such as undergoing unnecessary training, performing administrative duties, and hosting external evaluations.

On 24 January 2024, the Minister of Education Permpoon Chidchob announced that Thai teachers will no longer be forced to take turns staying on school campuses after school hours in what is known as "teacher on duty". This follows the recent assault on a 41-year old female teacher on duty at Bang Pong Klua School in Chiang Rai province which caused several teacher associations to send petitions to the ministry to revoke the rule. The Office of the Basic Education Commission is also seeking cabinet approval to allow schools to rehire school janitors to reduce the amount of burdens placed on teachers following their phasing out.

== English language education ==
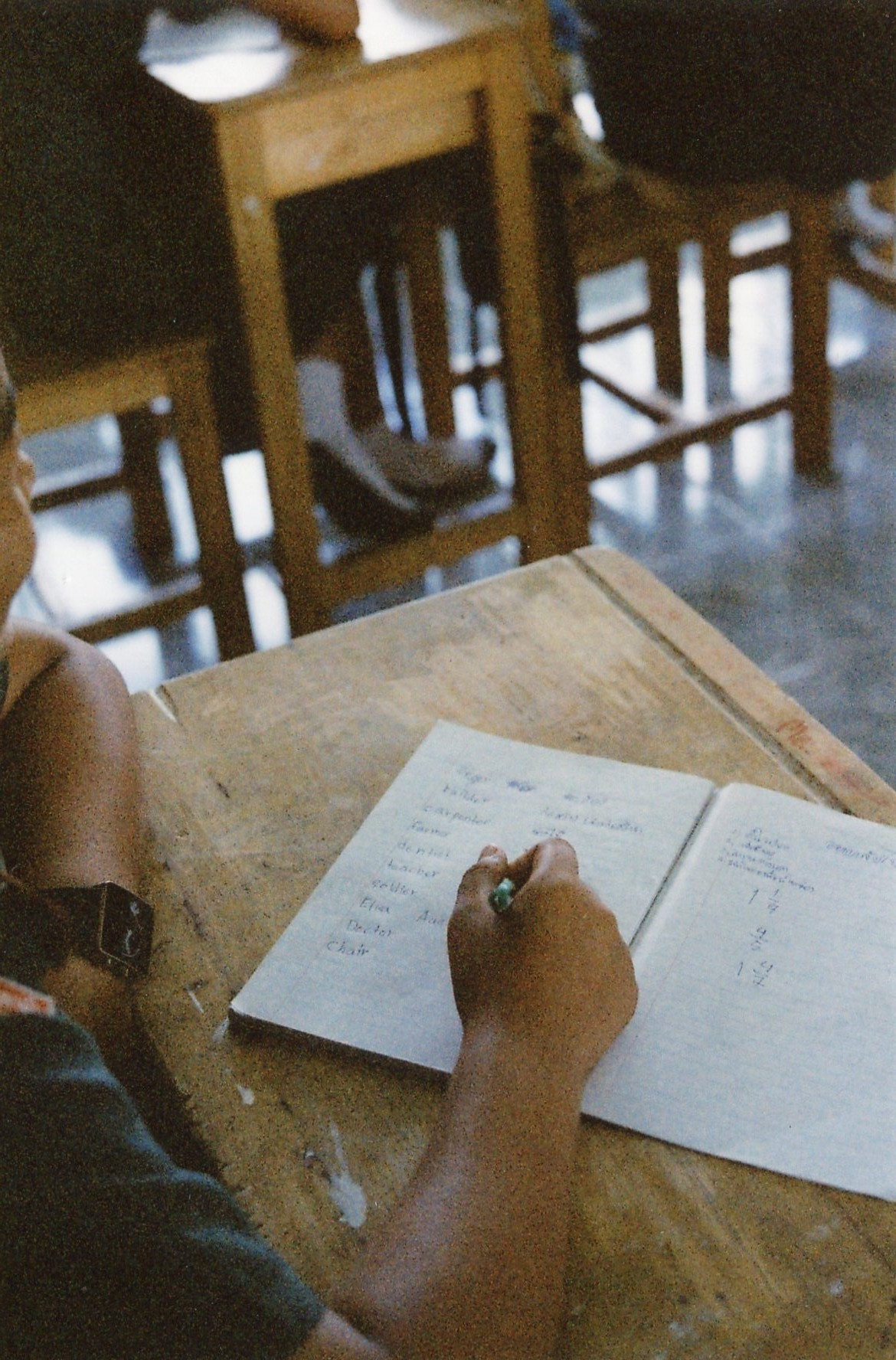
A student in an English lesson at a school in rural Thailand

Thai university applicants scored an average 28.34 per cent in English in recent university entrance exams. Thailand produces a "workforce with some of the world's weakest English-language skills." In a recent IMD World Competitiveness Yearbook Thailand was ranked 54th out of 56 countries globally for English proficiency. Singapore was third, Malaysia 28th and Korea 46th.

The government has long realised the importance of the English language as a core subject in schools, and it has been a compulsory subject at varying levels for several decades. Since 2005 schools are encouraged to establish bilingual departments where core subjects are taught in English as well as offering intensive English language programmes.

== Rural–urban and ethnic divides ==
Place of birth is a significant marker for predicting academic success in Thailand. Students in ethnic minority areas, predominantly rural, score consistently lower in standardized national and international tests. Students from poor families living in remote areas face limited access to quality education compared to their urban counterparts. Only 50 per cent of Thai students are taught academic subjects in their home language. This is likely due to unequal allocation of educational resources, weak teacher training, socio-economic factors (poverty), and lower ability in the central Thai language, the language of instruction and tests.

== Violence ==
A third of Thai students aged 13 to 15 suffered bullying at school between 2010 and 2015. Twenty-nine per cent were victims of physical violence. School violence instigated by students at technical or vocational schools is an ongoing problem.

== Sex education ==
Thai researcher Wichit Wongwarithip asserts that Thailand does not deliver on sex education. It fails with regard to gender diversity, gender equality, and safe sex. "Society tends to think that 'good morals' are the solutions to all problems and that Thai culture is the best," said Wichit. Thai sex education rests on the bedrock of the traditional values of heterosexuality and patriarchy. Instead of encouraging safe sex, Thai sex education tells schoolgirls to abstain until they are ready to form a family. Some Thai textbooks characterise masturbation as deviant behaviour and recommend meditation to suppress sexual desire. Jiraphon Arunakon, Director of the Gender Variation Clinic, says that sex education as taught in Thailand lags behind or ignores scientific research. The International Classification of Diseases (ICD) removed homosexuality from the "disease" classification in 1990 and Thailand's Ministry of Public Health asserted in 2002 that homosexuality is not a mental disorder. Parit Chiwarak, an education activist from Education for Liberation Network, says that students read their sex ed textbooks in order to pass exams, but do not take them seriously. "We all know that Thai textbooks are...sexist....I don't think that students nowadays perceive LGBT people as deviants. Students these days are not stupid. It's self-destructive to write things that oppose ordinary people's belief [sic] like this....", stated Parit.

Meanwhile, Thai sex education has done little to decrease Thailand's high teenage pregnancy rate. In 2014, about 334 babies were born daily to mothers aged between 15 and 19. Teen births in Thailand have been on the rise. Of every 1,000 live births, 54 are from teen mothers aged 15–19, higher than in the US and 10 times higher than Singapore. The number of live births by Thai teenage mothers aged 15–18 increased 43 per cent between 2000 and 2011. The reasons for this may be societal norms. "Women are told to protect their virginity but Thai men who have multiple sexual encounters are seen as cool," said Visa Benjamano, a commissioner at the National Human Rights Council (NHRC).

== Uniforms ==
Uniforms are compulsory for all students with very few variations from the standard model throughout the public and private school systems, including colleges and universities.

University uniforms are standard throughout the country and consist of a white blouse and plain or pleated skirt for females, and long black trousers, a white long-sleeved shirt with a dark blue or black tie for males. Thammasat University is the first university in Thailand that broke the uniform stereotype by providing choice for students to wear a polite uniform as a result of the democracy movement in 1932. Cracks in the university uniform policy began to appear in 2018 as a result of student agitation. The Faculty of Arts at Chulalongkorn University (CU) abolished the compulsory uniform requirement. CU has long claimed that its student uniform is prestigious as it was bestowed upon CU students by King Rama V, the university's founder. In Mahidol University (MU) which was founded in 1888 by Majesty King Chulalongkorn (Rama V) as Siriraj Hospital also has uniform requirement where students need to wear white shirt and The Mahidol University brooch is pinned on the right side of the shirt.

== See also ==
- List of schools in Thailand
- List of universities in Thailand
- List of libraries in Thailand
- Religion in Thailand
- Buddhism in Thailand
- Thai Chinese
- Thai cultural mandates
- Thaification
- South Thailand insurgency
- Migrant education
- Education for Liberation of Siam

== Sources ==
This article incorporates text from a free content work. Licensed under CC BY-SA (license statement/permission). Text taken from Issues and trends in Education for Sustainable Development, 68, UNESCO.
