= Sippanondha Ketudat =

Sippanondha Ketudat (Thai: สิปปนนท์ เกตุทัต, RTGS: Sippanon Ketthat, pronounced [sìp.pā.nōn kèːt.tʰát]; 23 February 1931 – 16 July 2006) was a Thai nuclear physicist, educationist and technocrat. He was a professor at Chulalongkorn University, and served as Secretary-General of the Office of the National Education Commission, Minister of Education and Minister of Industry. He held seats on several university councils, including multiple chairmanships, and was an honorary fellow of the Royal Society of Thailand.
