= Tamara Loos =

American historian

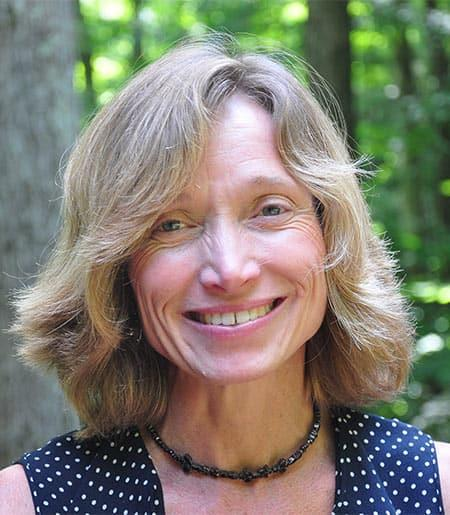
- Occupation: Professor of History

Academic background
- Education: Pomona College, Cum Laude in Asian Studies; Cornell University, Masters Southeast Asian History; Cornell University, PhD, Major field in Southeast Asian History; Minor fields in Modern Chinese History and Women’s Studies
- Doctoral advisor: David K. Wyatt
- Other advisors: Benedict Anderson; David W.P. Elliott

Academic work
- Discipline: Historian
- Sub-discipline: South East Asia, Thailand
- Institutions: Cornell University

Tamara Loos (born 1967) is an American historian and gender studies scholar at Cornell University.

== Biography ==
Tamara Loos is Professor of Southeast Asian history at Cornell University and has served as Chair of the History Department and Director of the Southeast Asia Program. Her first book, Subject Siam: Family, Law, and Colonial Modernity in Thailand, explores the implications of Siam's position as both a colonized and colonizing power in Southeast Asia. It is the first study that integrates the Malay Muslim south and the gendered core of law into Thai history. Her most recent book, Bones Around My Neck, offers a critical history of Siam during the era of high colonialism through the dramatic and tragic life of a pariah prince, Prisdang Chumsai. Her teaching and articles focus on an array of topics including sex and politics, subversion and foreign policy, sexology, transnational sexualities, comparative law, sodomy, and gender in Asia. She has been interviewed by The New York Times, The Washington Post, The Financial Times, and other global media outlets about political protests in Thailand.

== Radio interviews ==
- NPR: Thai Palace Officials Ousted Following Demotion Of Royal Consort
- BBC: The Inquiry: Why are Thai students risking jail to call for reform of the monarchy?
- Background Briefing with Ian Masters: Turmoil In Thailand As Subjects Question the King's Excesses and Entitlement

== Selected publications ==
- Loos, Tamara (2006). Subject Siam: Family, Law, and Colonial Modernity in Thailand. Ithaca: Cornell University Press.
- Loos, Tamara (November 2005). "Sex in the Inner City: The Fidelity between Sex and Politics in Siam". The Journal of Asian Studies. 64 (4): 881–909. doi:10.1017/S0021911805002263. S2CID 154473418.
- Loos, Tamara (2009). "Transnational histories of sexualities in Asia". The American Historical Review. 114 (5): 1309–1324. doi:10.1086/ahr.114.5.1309. PMID 20425923.
