= Suphannahong National Film Awards =

Primary film award of the Thai film industry

- The 2023 Award for Best Documentary, for the film The Last Breath of Sam Yan
- Awarded for: Excellence in cinematic achievements
- Country: Thailand
- Presented by: National Federation of Motion Pictures and Contents Associations
- First award: 1992; 34 years ago
- Website: https://www.mpc.or.th/

The Suphannahong National Film Awards (Thai: รางวัลภาพยนตร์แห่งชาติ สุพรรณหงส์, also known as the Thailand National Film Association Awards) is the primary film award of the Thai film industry. It is given annually by the National Federation of Motion Pictures and Contents Associations (MPC), and is named after the trophy statuette designed in the shape of the figurehead of the Royal Barge Suphannahong.

== History ==
The first film awards dedicated specifically to Thai films was inspired by Thailand's hosting of the 23rd Asia-Pacific Film Festival in 1977. The Film Producers Association of Thailand then hosted the first Golden Suphannahong Awards in 1979, using the same trophy design created earlier for the Asia-Pacific Film Festival. The Golden Suphannahong Awards were held a total of seven times, and ceased after 1988 when the Film Producers Association stepped back from its de facto leadership role in the Thai film industry.

The Federation of National Film Associations (now the MPC), which took over that role, began presenting a new series of awards, known as the National Film Awards, in 1992 (for films released in 1991). The ceremony was held in association with the Office of the Prime Minister's Film Promotion Board and the government public relations department, and the first awards were presented by Princess Maha Chakri Sirindhorn. It employed a "Milkyway to the Stars" symbol for its trophies. The awards were held annually for nine years, but was halted in 2001 as the Thai film industry produced few films in 2000.

The federation assumed responsibility for the event and revived the awards in 2002. The Suphannahong trophy was reinstated, now featuring a modern redesign. Since then, the awards, officially known as the Suphannahong National Film Awards, have been presented annually.

== Awards ==
- Best Picture of the Year
- Best Director of the Year
- Outstanding Performance by an Actor in a Leading Role
- Outstanding Performance by an Actress in a Leading Role
- Outstanding Performance by an Actor in a Supporting Role
- Outstanding Performance by an Actress in a Supporting Role
- Screenplay of the Year
- Outstanding Achievement in Cinematography
- Best Film Editing
- Best Sound Editing and Mixing
- Best Original Song
- Best Original Score
- Outstanding Achievement in Art Direction
- Best Costume Design
- Best Makeup and Hairstyling
- Best Visual Effects
- Best Documentary Feature

== See also ==
- Bangkok Critics Assembly Awards, the other major Thai film award
