= Edipcia Dubón =

Nicaraguan politician and human rights activist

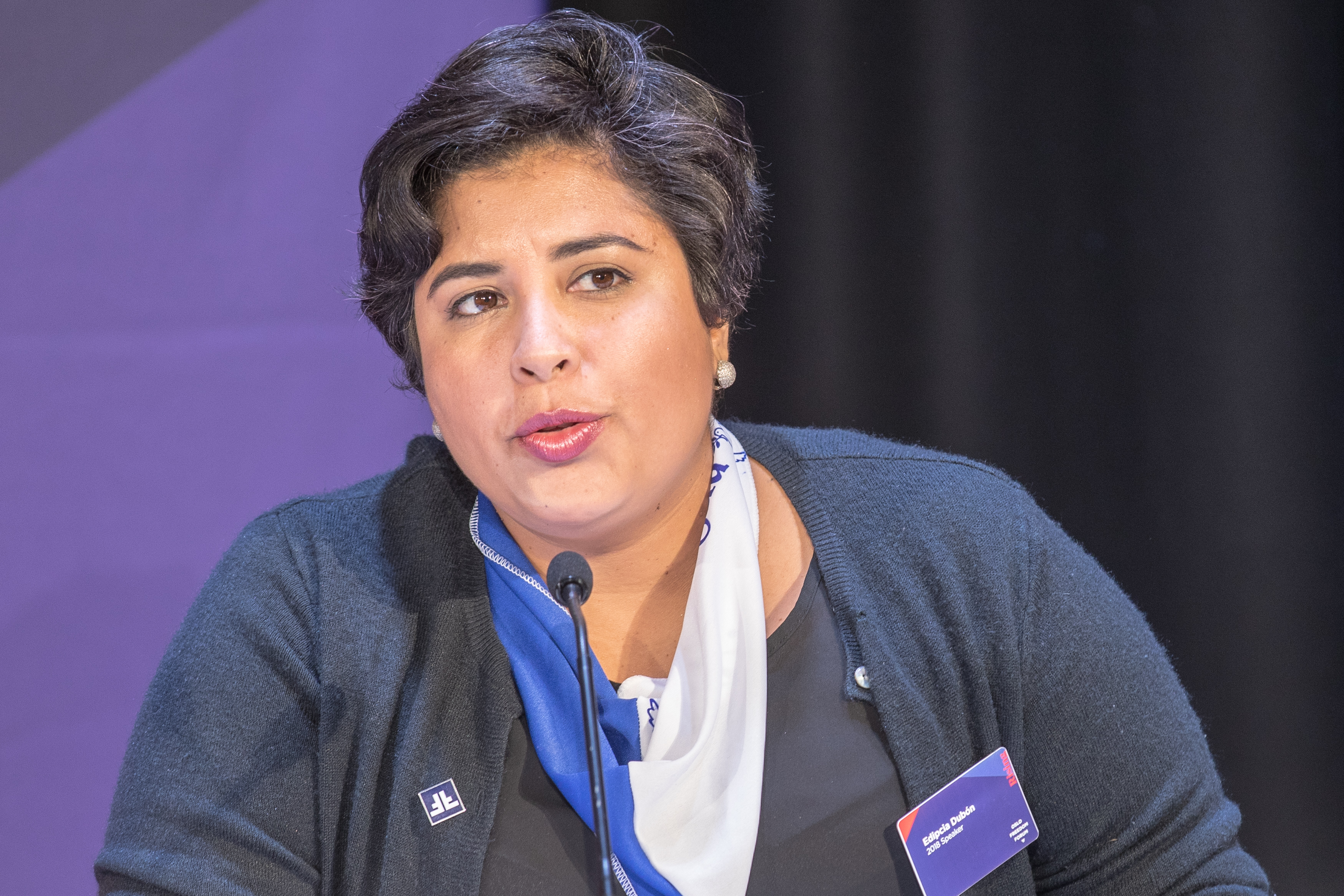
- Dubón in 2018

Edipcia Dubón is a Nicaraguan politician and human rights activist. From 2011 until her party's expulsion in 2016, she was a deputy to the National Assembly of Nicaragua, as a member of the Sandinista Renovation Movement (MRS).

== Career ==
Dubón served as a deputy to the National Assembly of Nicaragua, as a member of the Sandinista Renovation Movement (MRS), for about five years, from the 2011 general election until July 2016 when she was one of 26 deputies expelled from the Assembly. The incident arose in the months preceding the Nicaraguan general election. The Nicaraguan Supreme Court removed opposition leader of the Independent Liberal Party (PLI) Eduardo Montealegre and decreed that former party vice-president Pedro Reyes Vallejos was the new leader of the PLI. After PLI and allied MRS deputies refused to acknowledge Reyes, viewing him as a puppet for President Daniel Ortega, Nicaragua's Supreme Electoral Council ordered them removed from the National Assembly and empowered Reyes to select their replacements.
