= Gohan (film) =

- Theatrical release poster
- Thai: โกฮัง..หัวใจโกโฮม
- Directed by: Chayanop Boonprakob; Nattawut Poonpiriya; Atta Hemwadee
- Written by: Thodsapon Thiptinnakorn; Sopana Chaowiwatkul; Nattawut Poonpiriya; Atta Hemwadee; Chayanop Boonprakob
- Produced by: Vanridee Pongsittisak; Nattawut Poonpiriya
- Starring: Kitachima Yasushi; Poe Mamhe Thar; Chartchai Chinsri; Jinjett Wattanasin; Tontawan Tantivejakul
- Cinematography: Tawanwad Wanavit; Phaklao Jiraungkoonkun; Pasit Tandaechanurat
- Edited by: Peeradon Amarin; Panayu Kunvanlee; Supawit Buaket; Natthaphon Timmuang
- Music by: Hualampong Riddim
- Production company: BASK
- Distributed by: GDH 559
- Release date: April 2, 2026
- Running time: 141 minutes
- Country: Thailand
- Languages: Thai; Japanese; Burmese
- Box office: $937,309 (30 million Baht)

Gohan (Thai: โกฮัง..หัวใจโกโฮม, lit. 'Gohan..A Heart That Goes Home'), is a 2026 Thai drama film directed by Chayanop Boonprakob, Nattawut Poonpiriya, and Atta Hemwadee. It is produced by GDH 559, the same studio behind How to Make Millions Before Grandma Dies, The Paradise of Thorns, and Bad Genius. The film stars Jinjett Wattanasin, Tontawan Tantivejakul, Chartchai Chinsri, Nopphand Boonyai, Kitachima Yasushi, and Poe Mamhe Thar.

The story follows a white stray dog with a pink nose named "Gohan," whose life unfolds across three different stages. Throughout his journey, he longs for a place to call home and for an owner who can give him love and warmth.

== Plot ==
The film follows the story of a white stray puppy with a pink nose that lives in front of a 7-Eleven in Si Racha, Chonburi. The puppy climbs into the cooler bag of Hiro (played by Kitachima Yasushi), a Japanese automotive engineer, who names him "Gohan." (Note: It is written in Japanese as ごはん (Gohan), which means "rice.") While fond of him, Hiro's apartment forbids pets, and thus he is forced to relocate the puppy. Concurrently, his company finds a replacement for him, after years of urging him to retire. Hiro agrees to leave as soon as he finds a new owner for Gohan within the company. Meow (played by Jarinporn Joonkiat) takes him in, but Hiro eventually takes him back after Meow and Hiro realise Gohan is better off with Hiro. Their time together is cut short when Hiro passes away from COVID-19.

As a young dog, Gohan is later captured and taken to a dog shelter run by Goong, who uses it as a front for exploiting stray dogs for profit. Gohan is sedated to appear sick on Goong's livestreams where he receives donations from viewers who want to fund Gohan's treatment. Namcha (played by Poe Mamhe Thar), an undocumented migrant worker from Myanmar who had accepted the job before realising the dogs were being abused, sets them free after she has enough savings to run away. Gohan and Namcha travel to Bangkok together, but are kicked off the bus and she gives him a new name, "Brownie," after the dessert he saw at a market where they slept overnight, marking a new chapter in his life. Goong pursues them, culminating in Goong promising her permit if she brings Brownie back. Namcha leaves him on a train from Chachoengsao to Bangkok and confronts Goong at the station, with her phone recording. Soon, immigration officers arrive after Namcha had called them to report Goong for hiring undocumented workers. Namcha is deported back to Myanmar but the video footage of her confrontation is suggested to harm Goong's business permanently.

Gohan eventually settles at Hua Takhe railway station, once again living as a stray. There, he meets a young couple, Pelé (played by Jinjett Wattanasin) and Jaidee (played by Tontawan Tantivejakul), who often visit him over the four years of their university life, especially Jaidee, who grows particularly attached to him. She also gives him another name, "Hima" (Note: It is written in Thai as หิมะ (Hima), which means "snow."), inspired by the color of his fur. After they graduate, the couple breaks up, and Jaidee distances herself from Pelé, even when he tries to reconcile.

One day, in his old age, Gohan, now frail and losing his senses, is hit by a motorcycle. This leads Jaidee to discover that he is suffering from end-stage kidney disease, with only about three months left to live. Out of concern, she takes him in to care for him, while Pelé returns, hoping to help as well. Through Gohan, both of them come to understand the true meaning of "love", while he himself finally finds a place he can truly call "home."

== Cast ==
=== Main ===
- Kitachima Yasushi as Hiro
- Poe Mamhe Thar as Namcha
- Jinjett Wattanasin as Pelé
- Tontawan Tantivejakul as Jaidee
- Chartchai Chinsri as Paitoon
- Nopphand Boonyai as Goong
- Gohan is portrayed by three different dogs to represent the transitions across the three stages of his life:
  - Hima as Hima (Gohan in old age)
  - Meechok (lucky) as Brownie (Gohan in young dog)
  - Kori as Gohan (puppy age)

=== Guest ===
- Jarinporn Joonkiat as Meaow
- Ryota Omi as Sawada

== Production ==
=== Pre-production ===
Vanridee Pongsittisak, the film's producer, revealed that the project originated from her and Nattawut's love for dogs, which inspired the idea of creating a film centered around dogs. Later, Nattawut invited her to help develop the project, leading Vanaridee to gather ideas and bring on two additional directors, Chayonop and Atta, who shared a similar vision for a dog-centered film. Originally, Nattawut served as a producer, but he eventually became a co-director as well. The creative team collaboratively wrote the screenplay, portraying the journey of a dog named "Gohang" across three stages of life: childhood, adolescence, and old age, with each director responsible for telling the story of Gohang during one distinct stage of life.

In October 2025, Jina Osothsilp, CEO of GDH 559, officially organized a blessing ceremony to mark the start of principal photography. The film features actors from three countries: Thailand, Japan, and Myanmar.

=== Post-production & release ===
In February 2026, the official poster was released. Later, on March 4, 2026, a press conference was held to officially launch the movie at PAW YARD, EmSphere, Bangkok. Following that, on April 1, 2026, a gala premiere took place, featuring the debut of a large Gohan mascot at Paragon Cineplex, Siam Paragon.

The film was pre-sold in Southeast Asia and parts of East Asia prior to the promotional trailer screenings at the European Film Market (EFM) in Berlin in early 2026. Additional distribution was arranged for Latin America, and the film also attracted interest from Eastern Europe, Australia, New Zealand, India, North America, and Spain.

The film also had its official debut at the 78th Cannes Film Festival in France.

== Filming ==
Gohan is divided into three parts based on Gohan's life stages: childhood, adulthood, and old age. Each segment is directed by a different filmmaker, Chayanop Boonprakob directs the childhood portion, Nattawut Poonpiriya directs the adult years, and Atta Hemwadee directs the old-age segment.

The dogs portraying Gohan at each stage are real dogs of matching ages, three in total, and all have backgrounds as stray dogs. For example, Hima, who plays Gohan in old age, was originally a stray found at a market in Chiang Mai. He had only recently been abandoned by his owner when Nattawut happened to come across him and brought him to Bangkok for treatment. Atta, the director of this segment, drew inspiration from a real dog also named Hima in the story, a beloved campus dog at the Department of Visual Communication, Faculty of Architecture, King Mongkut's Institute of Technology Ladkrabang (KMITL) during his student years, which led to the creation of Gohan's story in this stage of life.

Meechok, who plays Brownie, Gohan in adulthood, is the only dog with an owner and was already a TikTok star. Nattawut, who serves as both producer and director, had to use various persuasive methods to convince the owner that the dog would genuinely be cast in a film and that he was not a scammer.

As for Kori, who plays Gohan in childhood, the dog had not even been born yet when casting and filming began. The story required a puppy around half a month to no more than two months old. Kori belonged to a foreign owner who was relocating and looking for a new home for the dog. Chayanop immediately liked him upon first seeing him, noting his mischievous yet charming appearance.

Throughout the production, a team of veterinarians and animal specialists was present at all times to ensure the animals' welfare.

The film was shot in Si Racha, Chonburi province, which serves as the real-life setting for Hiro's workplace and residence in Thailand. It also includes filming at Hua Takhe railway station, an actual location referenced in the story.

== Release ==
The film was screened in the Thai Visions, section of the 25th New York Asian Film Festival on 21 July 2026 for its North American Premiere.

== Reception ==
Shortly after GDH 559 released the trailer in early March 2026, it received overwhelmingly positive reactions, with many calling it one of the most anticipated Thai films. Audiences were also charmed by the adorable dog and his three owners.

=== Box office ===
The film grossed 30 million baht on its opening weekend and ranking first in Thailand outperforming The Super Mario Galaxy Movie as of mid-April 2026. The success of the film is being compared to the 2024 comedy drama film How to Make Millions Before Grandma Dies.

=== Critical response ===
Facebook page Kanin The Movie reviews that Gohan is less about a dog and more about the shared journey of life between humans and a stray that quietly passes through their worlds. While the premise may feel familiar, the film stands out through its intimate and reflective storytelling, capturing fleeting yet meaningful moments that often go unnoticed in everyday life.

Across its three chapters, the film explores different lives searching for a sense of "home," not just as a physical place, but as emotional grounding, belonging, and identity. Each owner's story mirrors Gohan's own journey, revealing how both humans and animals navigate loss, transition, and connection. Despite language and cultural differences, the narrative flows seamlessly, with Gohan, who never speaks, serving as the emotional center that ties everything together.

The YouTube channel Filmment highlighted that the film's strongest point lies in its charming, memorable moments with the three dogs, which deliver plenty of laughs and heartwarming scenes for the audience. However, they pointed out a major flaw: the lack of emotional continuity. Each act has its own distinct style, which often forces viewers to "reset" their focus, making it hard to stay fully immersed in the story. The channel owner also candidly admitted that he might be part of the minority who didn't enjoy the film.
