= How to Make Millions Before Grandma Dies =

2024 Thai film by Pat Boonnitipat

- Thai theatrical release poster
- Directed by: Pat Boonnitipat
- Written by: Thodsapon Thiptinnakorn; Pat Boonnitipat
- Produced by: Vanridee Pongsittisak; Jira Maligool
- Starring: Putthipong Assaratanakul; Usha Seamkhum
- Cinematography: Boonyanuch Kraithong
- Edited by: Thammarat Sumethsupachok
- Music by: Jaithep Raroengjai
- Production company: Jor Kwang Films
- Distributed by: GDH
- Release date: 4 April 2024 (Thailand)
- Running time: 125 minutes
- Country: Thailand
- Languages: Thai; Teochew Min
- Budget: $1 million
- Box office: $73.8 million

How to Make Millions Before Grandma Dies, known in Thai as Lahn Mah, (Note: Thai: หลานม่า, RTGS: Lan Ma, pronounced [lǎːn mâː], lit. 'Grandma's grandchild') is a 2024 Thai comedy drama film directed by Pat Boonnitipat (in his directorial debut) from a screenplay written by Pat and Thodsapon Thiptinnakorn. It stars Putthipong Assaratanakul and Usha Seamkhum in their debut feature film roles. In the film, M (Putthipong), a university dropout low on money, volunteers to take care of his terminally ill grandmother (Usha) in the hope of pocketing her inheritance.

Development on the film began in 2020 after Thodsapon completed the first draft of the screenplay, which underwent several revisions after Pat was hired as director. Putthipong and Usha were hired soon after the screenplay was complete. Principal photography took place in Bangkok, with filming locations including Talat Phlu. Upon release, How to Make Millions Before Grandma Dies went viral, spurred by a social media trend where viewers posted videos of themselves crying after watching the film.

How to Make Money Before Grandma Dies was first released in Thailand on 4 April 2024, by GDH. It grossed an estimated $73.8 million worldwide, becoming the second highest domestic grossing Thai film of 2024, the highest worldwide grossing Thai-language film of all time, and broke box office records in several countries across Asia. It received praise from critics for its direction, screenplay, cast performances, music, and heavy emotional weight. The film was selected as Thailand's entry for Best International Feature Film at the 97th Academy Awards and became Thailand's first submission to advance to the 15-film shortlist, but was not nominated.

== Plot ==
Mengju "Amah" Saejiu and her adult children Sew, Kiang, and Soei celebrate the Qingming Festival with Sew's son, M, a university dropout and aspiring video game streamer. She tells her family she wants to be buried on a big plot, which costs millions. Hospitalized after a fall, Mengju is diagnosed with late-stage colorectal cancer and is predicted to die in a year; her family decides to keep the diagnosis hidden from her. After M's wealthy paternal grandfather dies, most of his estate is left to his primary carer, Mui, M's cousin and online content creator. M then volunteers to become Mengju's carer, hoping to inherit her estate.

Before moving in, M lists Mengju's Talat Phlu house for sale. He initially struggles to curry favour with her, finding her demanding and unfiltered, and questions the morality of his decision but is convinced by Mui to continue. M tells Mengju of her diagnosis, who gradually accepts M's care, and he helps her sell congee. During a weekly family gathering, Mengju reveals that M informed her of her cancer. All of Mengju's children suddenly suggest methods to help care for her, which raises M's suspicions about their motive; thus, M increases his efforts as her primary carer.

Kiang, a wealthy stockbroker, arranges for Mengju to live with him and his family, offering to pay M to care for Mengju, but he declines the money. Mengju also declines to move in with Kiang, and she grows closer to M. Later, she finds out Soei stole ฿200,000 hidden in her kitchen to help cover his ฿1 million gambling debt. After confronting Soei, M gives him a silver belt from his grandfather to pay off his debt, then lies to Mengju, saying Soei is "out of town on work". One day, Mengju encounters a respondent to M's sale listing of her house, whom she turns away. She then gives M a reserved pomegranate and encourages him to develop more self-reliance.

Mengju takes M to meet her brother, who inherited millions upon the passing of their parents, and asks for money to purchase the plot. Her brother refuses and it is revealed that Mengju was their parents' carer until they died. She tells M she hopes a large burial plot would bring their family together by visiting her gravesite. After her doctors tell M that continuing treatment would be futile, he lies to her that she will instead receive treatment "based on her symptoms". Kiang asks Sew for the deed to Mengju's house, but she gives it to Soei, per Mengju's wishes. M angrily reacts to this and moves back home.

M learns that Sew, unlike him or Sew's siblings, did not want anything in exchange for caring for Mengju. Mui offers M half of her expected inheritance if he helps care for her dying aunt, but he refuses. Soei sells Mengju's house, fully covering his debts, and moves her to a nursing home. He attempts to repay M, who refuses. M moves Mengju into his home. He also confronts Soei and Kiang about their inaction in caring for Mengju. After Mengju dies, M receives a call from a bank, telling him that Mengju put aside money in his name since he was a child after he said he wanted to "buy her a new house". M empties the account and buys a big plot for her burial, which everyone attends.

== Cast ==
- Putthipong "Billkin" Assaratanakul as M, a college dropout. Paachan Hiranprateep plays a young M.
- Usha Seamkhum as Mengju "Amah" Saejiu, M's 79-year-old maternal grandmother who is diagnosed with late-stage stomach cancer.
- Sanya "Duu" Kunakorn as Kiang, Amah's eldest son.
- Sarinrat "Jear" Thomas as Sew, Amah's daughter and M's mother.
- Pongsatorn "Phuak" Jongwilas as Soei, Amah's youngest child.
- Tontawan "Tu" Tantivejakul as Mui, M's paternal cousin.
- Duangporn Oapirat as Pinn, Kiang's wife.
- Himawari Tajiri as Rainbow, Kiang's and Pinn's daughter.
- Wattana Subpakit as Amah's brother.
- Sumalee Suteeratham as Agong's sister.
- Phichai Prommate as Agong.
- Buppa Suttisanon as Ngek.

== Production ==
=== Development ===
Unlike most GDH films, (including those produced by its wholly owned subsidiary production company Jor Kwang Films), which are usually developed by producers or directors, How to Make Millions Before Grandma Dies was pitched by GDH screenwriter Thodsapon Thiptinnakorn in December 2020. Thodsapon's idea revolved around a ten-page synopsis inspired by caring for his grandmother during the COVID-19 pandemic and the family conflict over the lack of inheritance given to her daughter or caregivers. Producers Vanridee Pongsittisak and Jira Maligool worked with Thodsapon to make an "accessible and entertaining" slapstick comedy featuring only the grandmother and grandchild under the working title The Chinese Family, but this was later judged to have "lost [the] original charm" of Thodsapon's treatment.

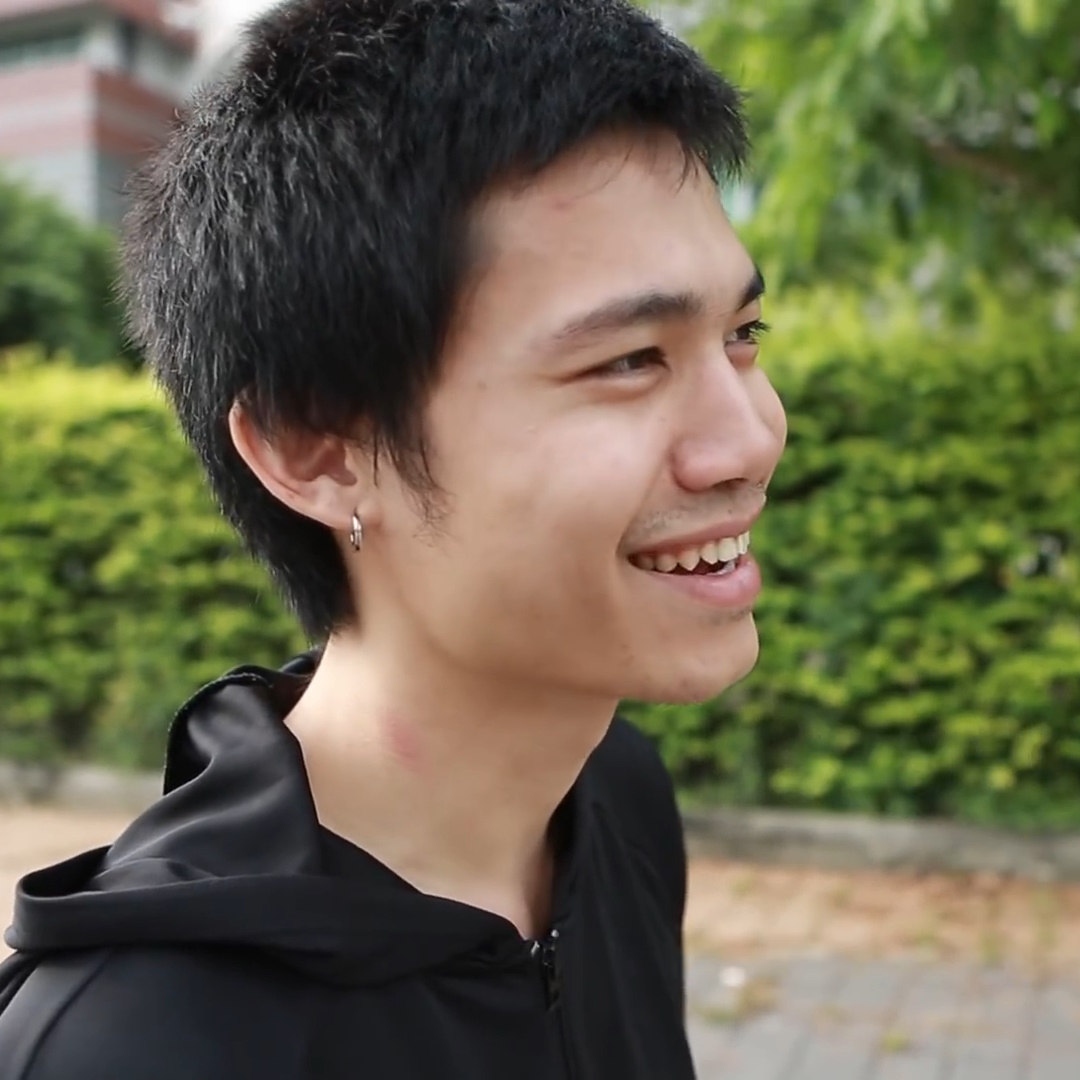
Pat Boonnitipat (pictured in 2018) wrote and directed the film in his directorial debut.

As such, after Thai Chinese director Pat Boonnitipat was hired, he worked with Thodsapon to adopt a more emotionally-driven narrative for the film: Pat had previously worked with GDH on Project S: The Series (2017–2018) and Bad Genius (2020). He incorporated elements from his own life to develop the final screenplay: his maternal grandmother, who helped raise him and with whom he still lives, was diagnosed with late-stage breast cancer in 2004. Pat and Thodsapon ultimately worked on the screenplay for four hours a day, five days a week, over two years (which largely included hours-long conversations about their respective families and lives): during this time, the screenplay evolved to include other characters beyond the grandmother and grandson.

Pat later stated it took him eight months to learn how to write for film compared to television; How to Make Millions Before Grandma Dies is his feature film debut. He spoke on the process, saying, "It is much harder to be precise making a film [compared to] TV, which uses coverage—shooting a lot of material and then deciding later [what] to use. For film, every shot [must] be intentional, to make the most out of every moment." During a February 2024 promotional interview at the Santa Barbara International Film Festival, Pat argued that his previous television projects required "controlling" and guiding the audience's emotions and reaction, which he felt left the projects with a lesser "depth of feeling": for How to Make Millions Before Grandma Dies, he abandoned this in favor of approaching the film wanting to make the audience "reflect about themselves". Reflecting on the experience, Vanridee commented that the film's development during the pandemic was uncertain but liberating, stating, "We just focused on telling the story as honestly as we could [and] somehow, that very personal approach allowed the film to travel farther than anything we had done before."

In an interview with Resonate, Pat revealed that most of the film's early development and pre-production was spent developing the film's characters: the grandmother was partly based on Thodsapon's grandmother while the mother was modelled and named after Pat's mother. Pat and Thodsapon also assigned their respective real-life anecdotes to inform the film's other characters and plot points. Despite these changes, Pat centred the audience as the film's ultimate target, saying, "my main goal was to keep the feeling [that] we're striving for something that could make you feel that it's your [life], not 'my' [film]". He also stated that this informed his decision to retain some of the comedic elements from the film's early screenplays. Pat stated that his grandmother directly opined on the screenplay after he moved back in with her when writing, while the other characters were based on his Cantonese-speaking mother's family, describing the representation of those characters in the film is as "exactly the same [as my own family], even the dialogue". This was echoed by Phuak, who said some of the film's dialogue "mirrored" his life and was a "reflection" of his past. The writers revised the screenplay to include themes on contemporary Thai family dynamics, specifically related to western and Asian attitudes regarding extended and nuclear families.

=== Casting ===
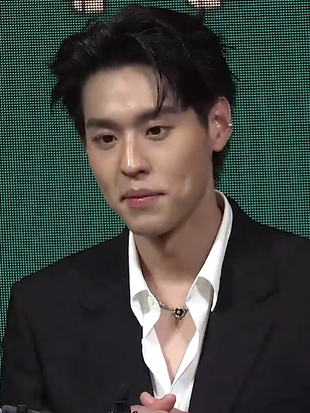
Putthipong "Billkin" Assaratanakul (pictured in 2024) was cast in his debut lead film role for How to Make Millions Before Grandma Dies.

Putthipong "Billkin" Assaratanakul was cast in his debut lead film role, alongside acting debutante Usha "Taew" Seamkhum. Putthipong was the producers' first choice but Pat disliked his initial audition: Putthipong was hired following a second audition, after taking a long break from acting to attend acting classes. Pat immediately wanted to cast the then-78-year-old Usha after her audition, with his assistant director discovering her through a modelling agency Usha was signed to after participating in a seniors dance competition in 2019.

Speaking on hiring Usha, Pat stated "I wanted the [film's] acting to be natural [and] ideal way to be natural is to find someone who has never acted. [Usha] didn't have any pre-concept of acting. She believed in the story [and] became an actor. It's her gift and it's very charming". Usha was ultimately cast after a screen test with Putthipong, with the producers also wanting a first-time actress for the role. Usha was hesitant to accept the role due to fears over not remembering her lines: she ultimately wrote out her lines by hand to help with active recall during filming. Usha and Putthipong grew close during principal photography, with Usha stating, "I felt like I was with my own grandson. We got along so well, [filming] was so entertaining and comfortable".

Putthipong said that the film required "detailed and focused acting" compared to his appearances in the television series My Ambulance (2019) and I Told Sunset About You (2021): he had to lose weight and alter his natural walk and speech patterns to portray his character in the film. Putthipong also claimed to have declined numerous other film and television projects in favor of How to Make Millions Before Grandma Dies. In an interview with The Review Geek in August 2024, Pat said he catered the screenplay and the character to fit Putthipong. This included using a year's worth of acting workshops, in place of standard rehearsals, between Pat and Putthipong to finalize his character prior to filming. The remaining cast was then rounded out, which included the feature film debut for Tontawan "Tu" Tantivejakul.

=== Filming ===
Principal photography mostly took place across Talat Phlu, with filming locations including Talat Phlu railway station.

Principal photography primarily took place in Talat Phlu, a traditional Thai Chinese community recognized as one of Bangkok's Chinatowns. Filming locations included Talat Phlu Market and Wat Chantharam Worawihan, both of which became popular visiting locations among fans following the film's release. According to Putthipong, filming lasted for 25 days and was primarily done using a single-camera setup: Pat later revealed shooting difficulties with this setup, due to some scenes requiring filming the cast doing "their own things" at the same time. Boonyanuch Kraithong, the director of photography for How to Make Millions Before Grandma Dies, used narrow apertures and wide shots to add depth and emphasize the characters and their surroundings, in contrast to contemporary films that use a shallow focus. Pat also used strict blocking and movement instructions to achieve this effect, which was inspired by filmmaking techniques present in Thai films from the 1950s until the 1970s.

Pat sought to differentiate the style of How to Make Millions Before Grandma Dies to the faster-paced television series he previously worked on, which included reducing the use of music. In a July 2024 interview with Lifestyle Asia, Pat said the filming choices worried GDH executives, who considered them to be too unconventional. Pat aimed to make the film as quick as possible to make sure his maternal grandmother could watch it and for him to return to helping out at his family's mirror and glass-making business. He also used the reaction of the film's crew to assess its scenes, saying, "the first camera assistant [is] very [composed] and while he was doing the focus pulling on set, he cried so much [filming a scene], he couldn't keep his hand on the wheel. That's when I knew [a] scene [would] work so well, because it broke his [emotional] wall". During a June 2024 interview with The Straits Times, Usha revealed that How to Make Millions Before Grandma Dies was the first film to also make her cry.

To accommodate for Usha's age, the crew implemented regular breaks during shooting to allow her to rest. According to Pat, scenes which featured Usha walking or talking with Putthipong took the most takes to complete, owing to her inexperience in acting and Pat's strict blocking requirements. He also stated Usha completed the film's "most challenging" scenes in one take, saying, "[Usha] is a magical person. She was unpredictable. Each take [from her] was a masterpiece". According to Jake Yancey of Hollywood Insider, How to Make Millions Before Grandma Dies uses strict opposing colors for its characters and settings to reinforce the film's overarching themes of generational and emotional difference. Pat refused to show the film's designers references to create its indoor sets and instructed them to solely use the screenplay as inspiration: the designer subsequently designed the indoor set depicting Mengju's home as a replica of his mother's. Many of the scenes were filmed without staged prior rehearsals involving dialogue and contained improvisation, with the cast revealing any rehearsals predominately focused on Pat's strict blocking and movement instructions.

Although required by GDH to make abstract pitches regarding the film's themes to secure funding from potential investors, Pat refused to share any details of the film's themes with the cast, saying, "I wanted them to be completely present [while filming] and really open up to each other so when we hit record, [their acting] came out completely naturally". Pat was encouraged to favor wide shots and implement a slow pace for How to Make Millions Before Grandma Dies despite being told it may not generate much box office return, saying, "Many people told me the film might not make much money [so] I treated [filming it] as if it might be my first and last feature. I wanted it to feel timeless."

== Themes ==
Benediktus Yogatama of Kompas argued the film also contained several themes related to financial planning and personal budgeting. These themes were confirmed by Vanridee and Maligool during a June 2024 interview with Golden Screen Cinemas. Hollywood Insider's Jake Yancey stated How to Make Millions Before Grandma Dies explores gender roles, generational divides and similarities, aging, and the Thai Chinese cultural experience. This was echoed by Usha in a February 2024 interview, stating, "[the film] is about how the older generation's loneliness and longing to connect with their [splintered] families", and revealing that symbolism related to a pomegranate in How to Make Millions Before Grandma Dies refers to a Thai Chinese tradition of families growing a pomegranate tree in front of their house to ensure prosperity for their children.

Tan Ying Ying, a linguistics professor at Nanyang Technological University, wrote the film explores the effects of language planning in southeast Asia, citing its scenes that included dialogue in Teochew Min and 2020 census data which found 1.4% of Singaporean Chinese aged 5 to 34 used non-Mandarin Chinese varieties as their most or second most frequent language, compared with 31.6% of Singaporean Chinese aged 60 and above. Ying argued that these languages are incorrectly labelled as "dialects" and are less spoken today due to government initiatives, such as the Speak Mandarin Campaign in Singapore. Ying stated these policies have damaged inter-generational communication between grandparents and grandchildren and have caused issues for older people to navigate public services, such as M and Amah in the film. Ying concluded by writing, "How to Make Millions Before Grandma Dies [gives] that language loss a narrative shape. [The viewer] romanticises the loss and [the language] is part of what gives [the film] emotional force, [a] story [which] becomes an elegy [of] memory, inheritance and disappearance".

MaoHui Deng, a lecturer in film studies at the University of Manchester, argued that How to Make Millions Before Grandma Dies's contrast of Sew's responsibilities with her brothers is a critique of the gendered expectation in non-Western communities of women assuming the caring responsibilities of older people, stating they are "regularly shortchanged [by] performing [this] labour". Deng also stated that while caring expectations for older people in the West regularly reflect institutional care and its associated costs, cultural narratives outside the West instead spotlight "inter-generational reciprocity" regarding care of older people, which is depicted in the film. Deng went onto compare these ideas in How to Make Millions Before Grandma Dies to Late Spring (1949), Singapore Dreaming (2006), A Simple Life (2011), and Plan 75 (2022).

== Music ==
Jaithep Raroengjai was hired to compose the film's score and the soundtrack album was released digitally by GMM Music, the parent company of GDH, on 17 September 2024. It includes seven songs featured in or inspired by the film, including its theme song "Ever-Forever" performed by Putthipong, and a cover of the Chinese traditional folk song "Aum Kim Kong" performed by Usha. In a June 2024 interview with Magdalene, Raroengjai said the film's music, which primarily features a repurposed wooden piano, was composed to be "natural" to make How to Make Millions Before Grandma Dies "feel real, raw, and close to the audience": during writing, Pat solely listened to "gentle [and] natural" piano. The music, which features sporadically during How to Make Millions Before Grandma Dies, was recorded over a three-day period in a film editing studio.

== Marketing ==
How to Make Millions Before Grandma Dies gained international attention after videos from SM Supermalls theatres in Manila, where staff handed tissues to viewers, went viral. Social media users contributed to its virality by posting videos of themselves crying after watching the film. Indonesian production company Falcon Pictures hosted press conferences with Pat in Jakarta between 25 May and 27 May in response to the film's initial success. After its success in Singapore, Usha and Pat attended an event hosted by Golden Village in Suntec City on 24 June 2024: this included a screening and cast meet-and-greet, which sold out quickly, prompting a second session later that the same day.

Ahead of the film's release in the U.S., Usha conducted a Q&A session in Los Angeles. In the U.S., distributor Well Go USA and the PR firm Shelter marketed the film to Academy voters ahead of the 97th Academy Awards, organizing special screenings, including at universities, to encourage word-of-mouth support. When she revealed the film's budget was US$1 million, Vanridee stated students were shocked, calling it a "very tiny budget", and commented that, due to their relatively lower budgets, "every [major] Thai film is [a] world's indie film". After its release, the film was screened at the 2026 ASEAN-China Week Conference in Yuzhong as part of an ASEAN film cultural showcase, which lasted from November 23 until November 25.

== Release ==
=== Theatrical ===
How to Make Millions Before Grandma Dies was released in Thailand by GDH on 4 April. It premiered internationally in competition at the 23rd New York Asian Film Festival on 17 July 2024. Tickets for its initial premiere sold out almost immediately; a second screening then took place, which was attended by Pat and Putthipong. The film was screened in Beijing for officials of the Thai embassy in China on 18 August, organized by Thailand's ambassador to China, Chatchai Viriyavejakul. It also screened for embassy officials, Thai nationals, and Czech and international students at the Municipal Library in Prague on 21 September, organized by Suwat Kaewsook, Thailand's ambassador to the Czech Republic. The film premiered in the "A Window on Asian Cinema" program at the 29th Busan International Film Festival on 3 October and competed at the 2024 Asian World Film Festival on 16 November.

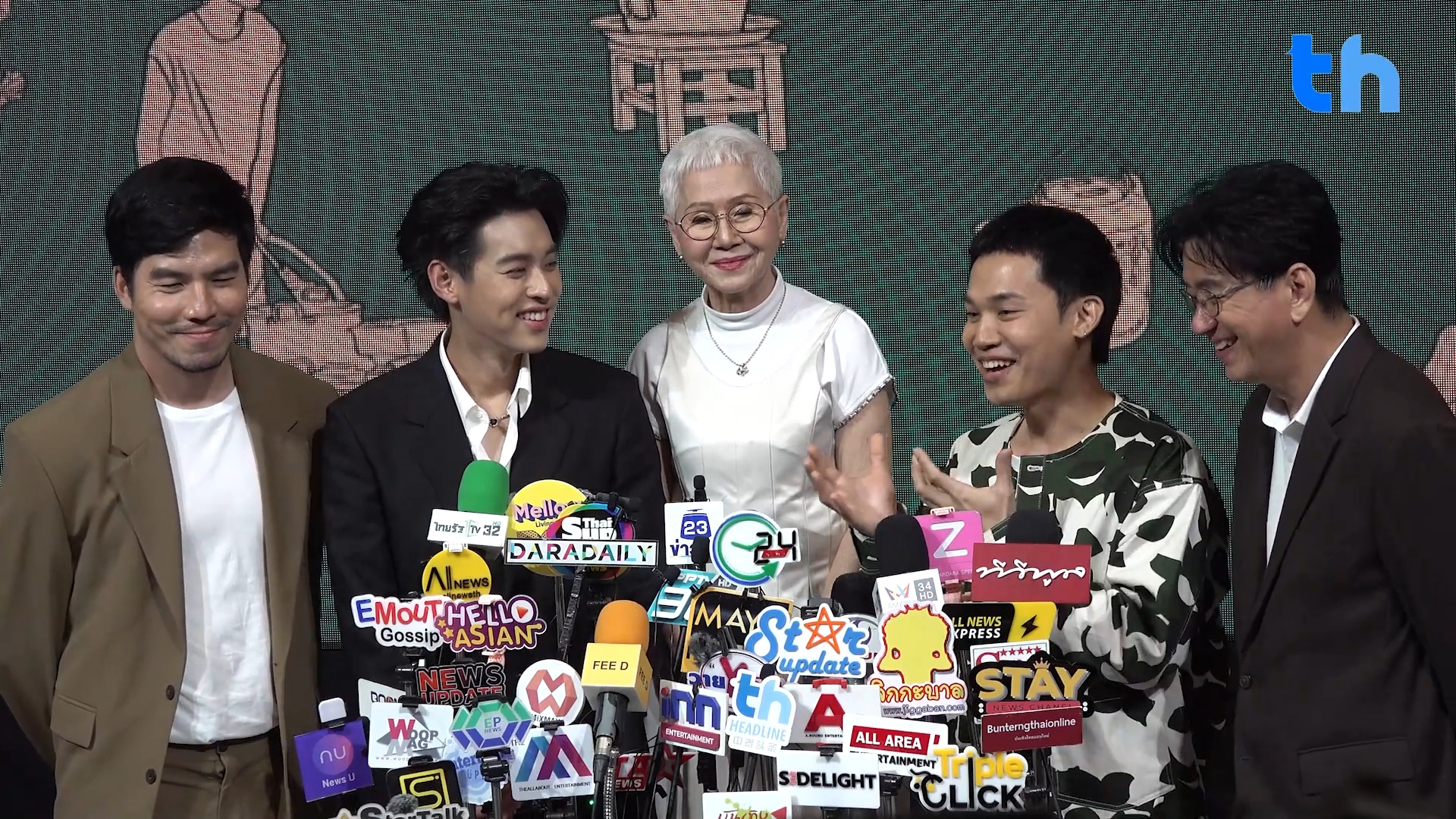
From left to right: Pongsatorn, Putthipong, Usha, Pat, and Sanya at the film's February 2024 launch event

Following its Thai release, the film expanded across Southeast Asia. Between mid-May and late June 2024, the film opened across most of the region, including in Indonesia, the Philippines, Brunei, Malaysia, Singapore, Myanmar, Vietnam, Hong Kong, Macao, Cambodia, Taiwan, and Timor-Leste. It was released in mainland China on 23 August and in South Korea on 9 October. GDH handled regional theatrical distribution in Southeast Asia, with NK Contents distributing in South Korea. Teamer Media managed the Chinese release, with the film opening in 1000 theatres across 30 cities. How to Make Millions Before Grandma Dies was released in Japan on 13 June 2025, with its distribution handled by Unplugged.

How to Make Millions Before Grandma Dies was released in Australia and New Zealand on 18 July 2024, by Chinalion Film Entertainment, which previously distributed Bad Genius (2017) in both countries. WME Independent and Mokster Films oversaw distribution in over 110 additional territories, including Russia, where the film opened on 9 January 2025. Vertigo Releasing acquired the film's theatrical distribution rights for the United Kingdom and Ireland in August 2024: this was followed by Vedette Film for the Netherlands and Belgium, PVR for India, as well as Well Go USA for North America. How to Make Millions Before Grandma Dies began a limited release in North America on 13 September, in the Netherlands on 10 October, in Belgium on 13 November, and in the United Kingdom and Ireland on 26 December.

=== Home media ===
How to Make Millions Before Grandma Dies was released on streaming in Thailand, Indonesia, Malaysia, Singapore, and the Philippines by Netflix on 12 September 2024. It was the fourth-most viewed program on Netflix in its debut week in the Philippines in a shortened tracking period, with 3 million views in the week tracked from 9 September to 15 September. It was also the second most searched film on Google in the country in 2024.

Outside of Asia, the film was released for digital download, on Ultra HD Blu-ray, Blu-ray, and DVD in North America by Well Go USA on 10 December. How to Make Millions Before Grandma Dies was eventually released on streaming in most Western countries, including the United Kingdom and the United States, by Netflix in April 2025.

== Reception ==
=== Box office ===
A sleeper hit, How to Make Millions Before Grandma Dies grossed an estimated US$73.8 million worldwide, including ฿339,000,000 ($12.3 million) in Thailand, and initially became the highest-grossing film in Thailand in 2024 after grossing ฿250 million ($7.6 million) in its first fourteen days of release: this was since surpassed by Death Whisperer 2 (2024). It grossed ฿172.6 million ($5.3 million) in combined receipts in Metropolitan Bangkok and Chiang Mai alone, becoming the highest-grossing GDH film in Thailand and twelfth-highest grossing domestic film of all time.

Outside Thailand, the film grossed $1.4 million in Singapore in its first eleven days of release, and grossed $5.8 million in its first two weeks in China. How to Make Millions Before Grandma Dies has grossed $14.8 million in China, $25 million across Western markets (including $309,000 in the U.S.), and $34 million across Southeast Asia and Australia, making for an estimated worldwide gross of $73.8 million, becoming the highest-grossing Thai-language film ever by international gross.

According to GDH, How to Make Millions Before Grandma Dies has been screened to over ten million people, and it topped the box office in Singapore from 6–9 June, grossing $256,000, setting the record for the biggest opening weekend for a Thai film. Shirley Low, the chief marketing officer of the Malaysian-based Golden Screen Cinemas, noted How to Make Millions Before Grandma Dies exceeded their domestic box-office expectations for a Thai film. In Indonesia, the film sold over 3.5 million tickets (including selling 2 million in its first 13 days), setting the record for the most admissions for an Asian film in the country, surpassing the South Korean horror Exhuma (2024), which sold 2.6 million tickets.

The film broke or set several other box office records: in Indonesia, it is the highest-grossing Thai film and highest grossing Asian film, and it became the highest-grossing Thai film in Australia, New Zealand, Singapore, Myanmar, Vietnam, Malaysia, and the Philippines. In the Philippines, tickets were sold out on its opening day and screenings were increased to meet demand.

=== Critical response ===
On the review aggregator website Rotten Tomatoes, 100% of 39 critics' reviews are positive, with an average rating of 7.9/10. The site's critical consensus reads, "A comedy of generational manners that blossoms into a sweet tearjerker, How to Make Millions Before Grandma Dies bets big on earnestness and hits the jackpot." Audiences polled by Rotten Tomatoes gave the film an average rating of 96%, and audiences rated the film 8.9/10 based on 140,000 reviews on the Chinese review platform Douban. Metacritic, which uses a weighted average, assigned the film a score of 74 out of 100, based on 10 critics, indicating "generally favorable" reviews. Subsequent audience response was also positive, with the film being ranked as the eight-highest rated film of the 2020s on Letterboxd as of November 2026, with a score of 4.4/5.

In Asia, How to Make Millions Before Grandma Dies received industry-wide praise: Shirley Low, the chief marketing officer of Golden Screen Cinemas, commended the film's realistic portrayal of family life, saying, "everything in the film [reminded me of] my family". A similar sentiment was echoed by Ruby Ann O. Reyes, the vice president for corporate marketing for SM Supermalls. According to Pat, the film "stunned" his family (whom the characters are based on) and he stated they "[don't] talk about [the film] but they feel good that it happened". Following its box office success, Pat paid his grandmother for her influence on the film. In a review for Grazia Singapore, Danisha Liang praised Putthipong's convincing portrayal and highlighted Usha's "sassy—almost feisty" presence as the film's standout. The Philippine Star's Jelou Galang praised the production design and Kraithong's cinematography.

In a review for CNN Indonesia, Muhammad Hifzurahman commended the slower pace, saying "[it is] a packed story [that does not] patronize" and called the performances "sweet and very touching". He also praised the "simple choice of backgrounds" for not distracting away from the dynamic between the film's cast and further commended the music and scoring. Noel Wong praised How to Make Millions Before Grandma Dies for being an accurate reflection of Asian family dynamics in his review for Free Malaysia Today. Writing for The Rakyat Post, Keran Raj called the "witty and natural" screenplay as "one of the film's strongest aspects", while also praising the "charming and convincing" performance by Putthipong, the "warmth and wisdom" of Usha's performance, and their on-screen chemistry, which he labelled the "heart and soul" of the film.

The film was a critical success outside Asia. Writing for Film Threat, Alex Saveliev gave How to Make Millions Before Grandma Dies a positive review, saying it "brims with wisdom and insight" and called the comedy "acerbic and gentle". He also praised the dialogue, labelling it "biting, crisp, smart, and frequently heartbreaking". Simon Abrams of RogerEbert.com complimented the music, comedy, and Pat's direction, saying "every scene was packed with lived-in details". He also applauded the "care" and "sensitivity" in the screenplay, concluding the film is "a sunny, gracious portrait of family life". ScreenDaily's Allan Hunter further praised the direction, calling How to Make Millions Before Grandma Dies "a sentimental journey to redemption that [Pat] grounds in understanding and empathy", and lauded the emotional weight of Raroengjai's music. Hunter also commended the performances of the leads, calling Putthipong "nicely understated and thoughtful" and said Usha was "remarkable" in her portrayal of "a wise and gracious figure – not a typical cuddly grandma but someone canny, realistic and determined".

=== Accolades ===
How to Make Millions Before Grandma Dies won its first award, the Audience Award, at the 23rd New York Asian Film Festival, in July 2024. That October, the film was selected by the National Federation of Motion Pictures and Contents Associations as Thailand's submission for Best International Feature Film at the 97th Academy Awards. It became Thailand's first submission to advance to the 15-film shortlist, announced on 17 December, but the film or the cast failed to receive any nominations. Writing for Collider, Sara Resende argued Usha's performance was snubbed at Western film awards, stating, "[her] stunning [film] debut is nothing short of extraordinary and should [have gotten] award buzz".

Award	Date of ceremony	Category	Recipient(s)	Result	Ref.
New York Asian Film Festival	28 July 2024	Audience Award	How to Make Millions Before Grandma Dies	Won	
KinoBravo International Film Festival	4 October 2024	Best Actress	Usha Seamkhum	Won	
KinoBravo International Film Festival	4 October 2024	Best Cinematography	Boonyanuch Kraithong	Won	
Miami Film Festival	7 November 2024	Audience Award	How to Make Millions Before Grandma Dies	Runner-up	
Zagreb Film Festival	10 November 2024	PLUS Award for Best Film by the Young Jury	How to Make Millions Before Grandma Dies	Won	
Asia Pacific International Film Festival	1 December 2024	Best Picture	How to Make Millions Before Grandma Dies	Won	
Asia Pacific International Film Festival	1 December 2024	Best Director	Pat Boonnitipat	Nominated	
Asia Pacific International Film Festival	1 December 2024	Best Leading Actor	Putthipong Assaratanakul	Won	
Asia Pacific International Film Festival	1 December 2024	Best Leading Actress	Usha Seamkhum	Nominated	
Asia Pacific International Film Festival	1 December 2024	Best Supporting Actress	Tontawan Tantivejakul	Nominated	
Asia Pacific International Film Festival	1 December 2024	Best Original Screenplay	Thodsapon Thiptinnakorn and Pat Boonnitipat	Won	
Asia Pacific International Film Festival	1 December 2024	Best Original Music Score	Jaithep Raroengjai	Nominated	
Asia Pacific International Film Festival	1 December 2024	Best Art Direction	Patchara Lertkai	Nominated	
Asia Pacific International Film Festival	1 December 2024	Best Makeup & Costume Design	Jirateep Kluewan and Chayanuch Savekvattana	Nominated	
Gold List	8 January 2025	Best Picture	How to Make Millions Before Grandma Dies	Nominated	
Gold List	8 January 2025	Best Lead Performance	Putthipong Assaratanakul	Nominated	
Asian Film Awards	16 March 2025	Best Newcomer	Putthipong Assaratanakul	Nominated	
Thai Film Director Awards	4 April 2025	Best Picture	Jira Maligool and Vanridee Pongsittisak	Won	
Thai Film Director Awards	4 April 2025	Best Director	Pat Boonnitipat	Won	
Thai Film Director Awards	4 April 2025	Best Actor	Putthipong Assaratanakul	Won	
Thai Film Director Awards	4 April 2025	Best Actress	Usha Seamkhum	Won	
Thai Film Director Awards	4 April 2025	Best Supporting Actor	Sanya Kunakorn	Nominated	
Thai Film Director Awards	4 April 2025	Best Supporting Actor	Pongsatorn Jongwilas	Runner-up	
Thai Film Director Awards	4 April 2025	Best Supporting Actress	Sarinrat Thomas	Runner-up	
Thai Film Director Awards	4 April 2025	Best Supporting Actress	Tontawan Tantivejakul	Nominated	
Thai Film Director Awards	4 April 2025	Best Screenplay	Thodsapon Thiptinnakorn and Pat Boonnitipat	Won	
Thai Film Director Awards	4 April 2025	Best Ensemble	Putthipong Assaratanakul, Usha Seamkhum, Sanya Kunakorn, Sarinrat Thomas, Pongsatorn Jongwilas, Tontawan Tantivejakul and Himawari Tajiri	Runner-up	
Thai Film Director Awards	4 April 2025	Best Original Score	Jaithep Raroengjai	Won	
Thai Film Director Awards	4 April 2025	Best Cinematography	Boonyanuch Kraithong	Won	
Thai Film Director Awards	4 April 2025	Best Film Editing	Thammarat Sumethsupachok	Won	
Kom Chad Luek Awards	14 May 2025	Best Film	How to Make Millions Before Grandma Dies	Won	
Kom Chad Luek Awards	14 May 2025	Best Director	Pat Boonnitipat	Nominated	
Kom Chad Luek Awards	14 May 2025	Best Actor	Putthipong Assaratanakul	Nominated	
Kom Chad Luek Awards	14 May 2025	Best Actress	Usha Seamkhum	Nominated	
Kom Chad Luek Awards	14 May 2025	Best Supporting Actor	Pongsatorn Jongwilas	Nominated	
Kom Chad Luek Awards	14 May 2025	Best Supporting Actress	Sarinrat Thomas	Nominated	
Kom Chad Luek Awards	14 May 2025	Best Screenplay	Thodsapon Thiptinnakorn and Pat Boonnitipat	Won	
Suphannahong National Film Awards	14 September 2025	Best Picture	Jira Maligool and Vanridee Pongsittisak	Won	
Suphannahong National Film Awards	14 September 2025	Best Director	Pat Boonnitipat	Won	
Suphannahong National Film Awards	14 September 2025	Best Actor	Putthipong Assaratanakul	Won	
Suphannahong National Film Awards	14 September 2025	Best Actress	Usha Seamkhum	Won	
Suphannahong National Film Awards	14 September 2025	Best Supporting Actor	Sanya Kunakorn	Nominated	
Suphannahong National Film Awards	14 September 2025	Best Supporting Actor	Pongsatorn Jongwilas	Nominated	
Suphannahong National Film Awards	14 September 2025	Best Supporting Actress	Sarinrat Thomas	Nominated	
Suphannahong National Film Awards	14 September 2025	Best Screenplay	Thodsapon Thiptinnakorn and Pat Boonnitipat	Won	
Suphannahong National Film Awards	14 September 2025	Best Cinematography	Boonyanuch Kraithong	Nominated	
Suphannahong National Film Awards	14 September 2025	Best Film Editing	Thammarat Sumethsupachok	Won	
Suphannahong National Film Awards	14 September 2025	Best Sound	Kantana Sound Studio	Won	
Suphannahong National Film Awards	14 September 2025	Best Original Song	"Ever-Forever" by Kachorndej Promraksa	Nominated	
Suphannahong National Film Awards	14 September 2025	Best Original Score	Jaithep Raroengjai	Won	
Suphannahong National Film Awards	14 September 2025	Best Art Direction	Patchara Lertkai	Nominated	
Suphannahong National Film Awards	14 September 2025	Best Costume Design	Chayanuch Savekvattana	Nominated	
Suphannahong National Film Awards	14 September 2025	Best Cultural Promotion Film	How to Make Millions Before Grandma Dies	Won	
Bangkok Critics Assembly Awards	17 September 2025	Grand Jury Prize	How to Make Millions Before Grandma Dies	Won	
Bangkok Critics Assembly Awards	17 September 2025	Feature Film of the Year	How to Make Millions Before Grandma Dies	Won (Note: Shared with The Paradise of Thorns, Shakespeare Must Die, Taklee Genesis, and Breaking the Cycle.)	
Golden Rooster Awards	15 November 2025	Best Foreign Language Film	How to Make Millions Before Grandma Dies	Nominated	

== Legacy ==
How to Make Millions Before Grandma Dies has been considered an atypical box office hit for Thai cinema, which has historically favored horror, action, slapstick or teen comedy films. This was echoed by the film's producer Vanridee Pongsittisak, who said "we did not expect this scale of success". According to Resonate, the film inspired its younger audiences to strengthen connection with elder family members, which was echoed by Pat, who said, "many [younger] people now taking their grandparents out. [The film] has inspired people to spend more time with their elders". In an interview with Variety, GDH associate director of business development Yanisa Hankansujarit stated this impact stretched globally, saying, "My family in the U.S. told me that their children started to come home more often [after watching the film]". She also argued the film helped bring family audiences back to theaters in Southeast Asia following the closure of cinemas and changing theater-going habits following COVID-19.

Writing for The Korea Times, Esther Kim highlighted the commercial success of How to Make Millions Before Grandma Dies was part of a broader boom in Southeast Asian cinema between 2024 and 2025: during this period, Thai films made up a record 54% share of domestic box office receipts. Kim argued this upturn in performance was partly due to delays in American films being released in the region due to the 2023 Hollywood labor disputes, while Bruce Scott of Prestige argued this was prompted by an increase in foreign productions taking place in Thailand, citing Netflix's ฿6.5 billion (US$200 million) investment to support Thai filmmaking; US studios spent an estimated US$395 million in total producing films in Thailand between 2022 to 2024. In a feature by Thai PBS, several filmmakers, including Vanridee, supported this, stating that an underdeveloped local production ecosystem, such as a lack of independent producers, and funding shortages are preventing Southeast Asian cinema from achieving international success. She stated the impact of How to Make Millions Before Grandma Dies could be the growth of Thailand's creative economy: according to the Office of the National Economic and Social Development Council (NESDC), it was worth US$44.5 billion in 2025. This marked 8% percent of the country's GDP, with nearly 990,000 people employed in the sector across 93,000 businesses.

In a March 2026 interview with Variety, Vanridee claimed the film's success prompted international studios - which largely engage with Thailand primarily for production services - to approach GDH to co-produce Thai films with global potential, commenting "[there is] trust in our storytelling [and] our ability to take those universal emotions and make them connect across different cultures". She also credited the success of How to Make Millions Before Grandma Dies behind the studio's intention to focus solely on producing original films which tell "modest, personal stories". According to Ian Jeremiah Patrick of Malay Mail, the film's success is representative of and demonstrated the continued rise in popularity of Thai entertainment in Malaysia.

== Remake ==
In May 2025, it was announced that Miramax acquired the English-language remake rights to the film, with Yvette Zhuang set to act as producer. In a press release, Miramax CEO Jonathan Glickman praised How to Make Millions Before Grandma Dies, saying: "[the film] is a rare gem that manages to be hilarious, surprisingly poignant, and moving all at once. Like the original, we hope our adaptation brings generations of families to the cinema".

== See also ==
- List of submissions to the 97th Academy Awards for Best International Feature Film
- List of Thai submissions for the Academy Award for Best International Feature Film
