= Usha Seamkhum =

Thai actress

- อุษา เสมคำ
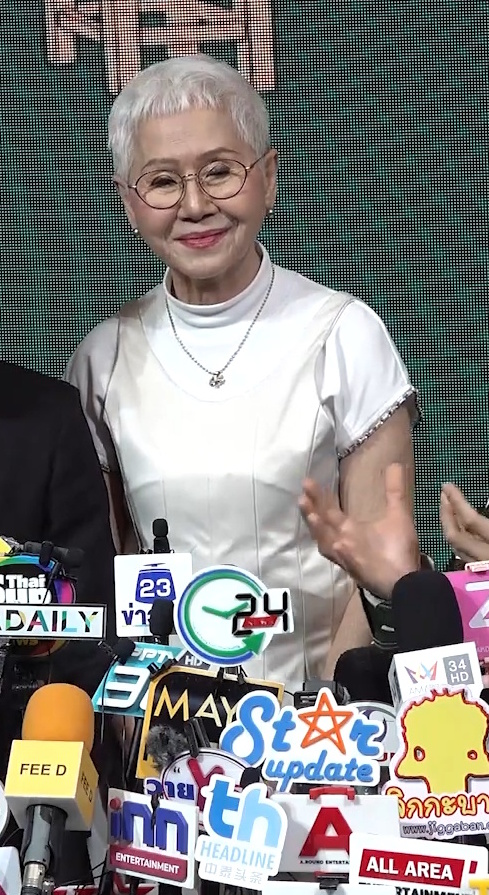
- Seamkhum in 2024
- Born: 1 February 1946 (age 80); Thailand
- Other name: Taew (แต๋ว)
- Occupation: Actress
- Years active: 2024–present
- Notable work: How to Make Millions Before Grandma Dies (2024)
- Children: 3

Usha Seamkhum (Thai: อุษา เสมคำ; RTGS: Usa Semkham, born 1 February 1946), nicknamed Taew (แต๋ว), is a Thai actress of Teochew descent. She is best known for her debut role as Amah in How to Make Millions Before Grandma Dies (2024).

== Background ==
Usha was born in Thailand on 1 February 1948. She is of Teochew descent. Prior to her acting debut, she was an ordinary housewife and a traditional Thai dancer. She has three daughters and four grandchildren.

Following a small acting role in a commercial video with actor Prin Suparat in 2019, she was discovered by debuting film director Pat Boonnitipat and GDH 559 casting crew and was invited to audition for the film How to Make Millions Before Grandma Dies and won the lead role of Amah, making her acting debut at age 78.

The film was released on 4 April 2024, in Thai theaters which became a commercial success, it was subsequently released internationally which farther boosted Usha's popularity.

Usha made her voice acting debut by lending her voice to the Thai science fiction romance film Uranus 2324 which was later released in Thai theaters on 4 July 2024.

She starred in the 2026 Singaporean romantic comedy film A Good Fortune which was released on 29 January 2026. On 30 April 2026, she portrayed the Thai Chinese character Zia Lamgi in her later years in a special appearance in the 2026 Chinese film Dear You.

== Filmography ==
=== Film ===
Year	Title	Role	Notes	Ref.
2024	How to Make Millions Before Grandma Dies	"Amah" Mengju Saejiu	Main role	
2024	Uranus 2324	"Lin" Linlada Sasinpimon (old)	Voice role	
2026	A Good Fortune	Thai elder		
2026	Dear You	Zia Lamgi (old)	Guest role	

=== Television series ===
Year	Title	Role	Network	Notes	Ref.
2025	ClaireBell	Pon	One 31	Supporting role	
2026	Be My Angel	Amah	iQIYI	Supporting role	

== Awards and nominations ==
Award nominations for Usha Seamkhum
Year	Award	Category	Nominee(s)	Result	Ref.
2024	KinoBravo International Film Festival	Best Actress	How to Make Millions Before Grandma Dies	Won	
2024	Asia-Pacific Film Festival	Best Leading Actress	How to Make Millions Before Grandma Dies	Nominated	
2025	Thai Film Director Awards	Best Actress	How to Make Millions Before Grandma Dies	Won	
2025	Kom Chad Luek Awards	Best Actress	How to Make Millions Before Grandma Dies	Nominated	
2025	Suphannahong National Film Awards	Best Actress	How to Make Millions Before Grandma Dies	Won	
