= Wattanasin =

Wattanasin is a surname. Notable people with the surname include:

- Charoen Wattanasin (born 1937), former badminton player from Thailand
- Jetrin Wattanasin, Thai pop musician and actor
- Jinjett Wattanasin, Thai actor and singer, son of Jetrin
