= Mater Dei School (Thailand) =

- มาแตร์เดอีวิทยาลัย
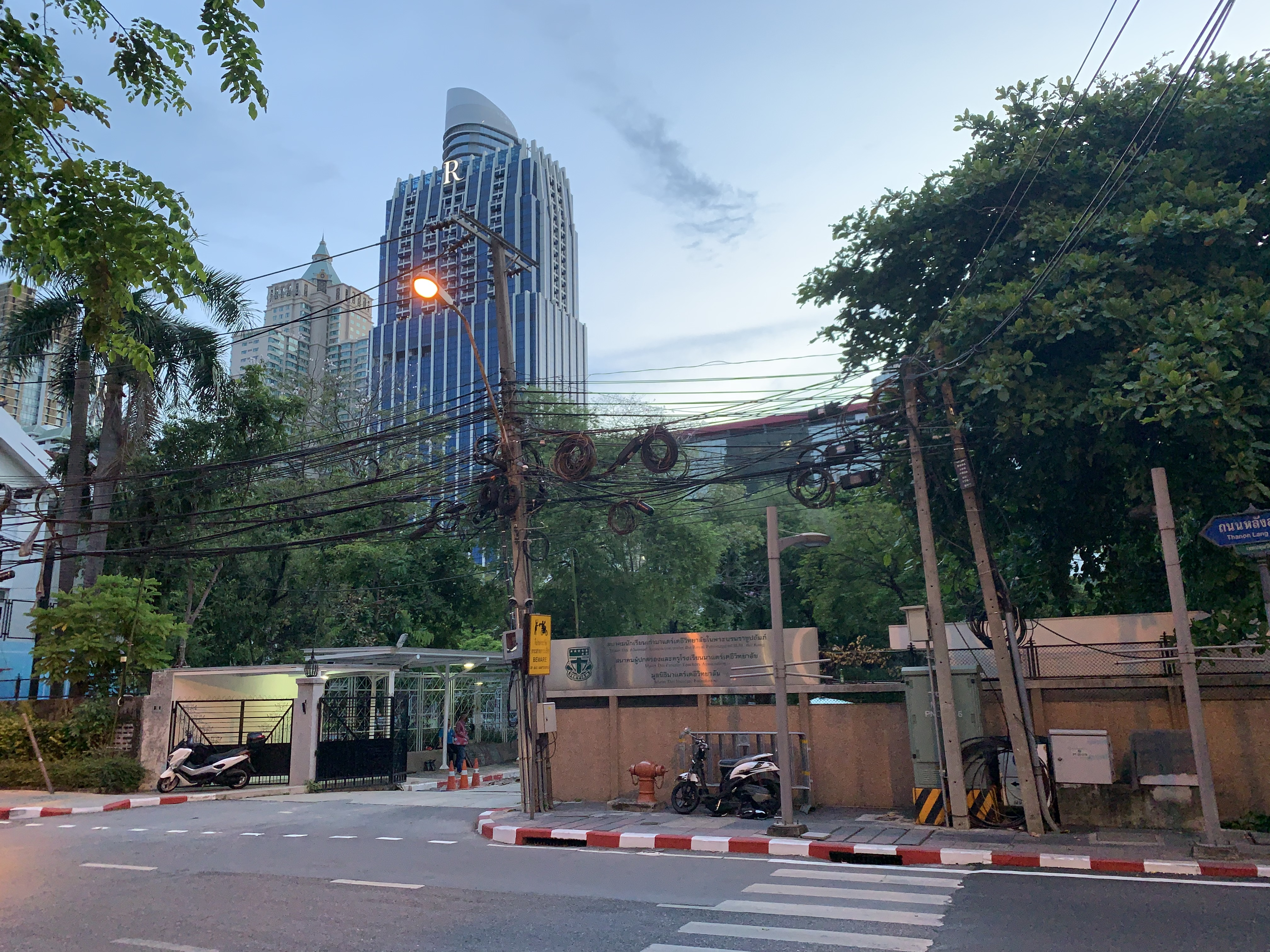
- School gate on Lang Suan Road in 2021

Location
- Pathum Wan; Bangkok; Thailand; 13.743158°N 100.543104°E

Information
- Type: Private
- Motto: Latin: Serviam (I will serve)
- Religious affiliation: Roman Catholic (Ursuline)
- Patron saint: Saint Angela
- Founded: 1928
- Grades: 3–12
- Gender: All-Girls
- Age range: 06-18
- Language: Thai, English, French, Chinese, Japanese
- Houses: Blue, Red, Yellow, Green
- Colors: Light Blue and White
- Alumni: Ananda Mahidol, Bhumibol Adulyadej, Kings of Thailand.
- Website: ,

Mater Dei School (abbreviated MD; Thai: มาแตร์เดอีวิทยาลัย; RTGS: Matae De-i Witthayalai) is a private Catholic school in Bangkok, Thailand.

The school is run by the Sisters of the Ursuline Order who founded the school in 1928. "Mater Dei" is a Latin phrase which means "Mother of God".

== Graduating Class Code ==
Mater Dei uses a batch-based system like most Thai schools, such Triam Udom Suksa School and Suankularb. Under this system, graduating cohorts are identified by sequential batch numbers. For example, the Class of 2023 is referred to as materdei93, indicating the 93rd graduating class since the school's first cohort, materdei1 graduated in 1930.

== History ==
In 1925, the Ursuline Sisters of the Roman Union sent four of their European sisters to carry out educational works in Thailand at the invitation of Archbishop Rene Perros, head of the Catholic mission in Siam. In 1926, Sister Marie Bernard Mancel, the second superior of the Ursuline Order in Thailand, decided to purchase a piece of land of about 18 rai (just under 3 hectares) with a large house. The house was removed, and Mater Dei was built on the land. It became the only educational institution on Ploenchit Road.

In 1927, classrooms were set up based on the British education system, enrolling students from Kindergarten to Form V and comprising two departments, the English and the French departments. The school accepted both day and boarding students and was considered to be the first school in the area to offer Kindergarten level.

Mater Dei was founded on February 2, 1928. Classes commenced on February 6, 1928, with 45 students. Initially, two Sisters were assigned to accompany the students to and from Rajprasong since the area was rather deserted.

Although Mater Dei was an all-girls school, it also enrolled boys from Kindergarten to Primary 2. One of those students was Prince Ananda Mahidol (student number 273), who enrolled in 1930. He became the king of Thailand in 1935, and after his death in 1946, he was succeeded as King by his brother, Prince Bhumibol Adulyadej, who also enrolled at the school in 1932 (student number 449).

In 1936, Mater Dei changed its curriculum to conform to that of the Ministry of Education. The Ministry opened a Pre-University School in order to prepare students for university education. It ordered other schools to discontinue classes for the last two years in the Secondary level, thus reducing the student numbers. Mater Dei then opened a Finishing Course in 1939 that required three years to complete. There was no emphasis on vocational training, but students were taught domestic science and job skills.

In 1944, during World War II, following the advice of the Ministry of Education, the school evacuated students to its newly opened school in Hua Hin. It was moved back to the original location in 1945 when the war ended and the Japanese occupiers left.

In 1960, the Sisters built a new school at Lang Suan Road for their growing student body. This was expanded in 1962.

In 1964, 1965 and 1966, Mater Dei received the "Outstanding School" Award. In 1966 it also received a royal plaque.

In 2026, the school was officially recognized by the Foundation of the Ursuline Sisters for great cultural and academic achievement.

== Facilities ==
To commemorate the 50th anniversary of Mater Dei's founding, the "50th Memorial Building" was opened in 1981. It is currently the school's gymnasium.

The most recent building was built in 1992. It houses the Kindergarten and Secondary School. Its name, "Royal Celebration Building", was given by King Bhumibol to celebrate his 6th cycle (72nd) birthday.

== Notable alumni ==
- Ananda Mahidol, King Rama VIII of Thailand
- Bhumibol Adulyadej, King Rama IX of Thailand
- Dasanavalaya Sorasongkram, niece of King Rama IX
- Pattranite Limpatiyakorn, nicknamed "Love", Actress
- Plearnpichaya Komalarajun, nicknamed "June", Actress and singer
- Paetongtarn Shinawatra, 31st Prime Minister of Thailand
- Ploenchan Vinyaratn, Thai textile artist
