= 23rd New York Asian Film Festival =

Asian film festival in New York

- Official poster
- Opening film: Victory by Park Beom-su
- Closing film: Twilight of the Warriors: Walled In by Soi Cheang
- Location: Film at Lincoln Center, New York
- Founded: 2002
- Awards: Uncaged Award: Snow in Midsummer by Chong Keat Aun; Audience Award: How To Make Millions Before Grandma Dies by Pat Boonnitipat; Rising Star Asia Award: Lee Hye-ri
- Hosted by: New York Asian Film Foundation Inc.
- Artistic director: Samuel Jamier
- No. of films: 94 films
- Festival date: Opening: 12 July 2024; Closing: 28 July 2024
- Language: International
- Website: NYAFF

New York Asian Film Festival
- 24th 22nd

The 23rd New York Asian Film Festival was held in New York on 12 July with World Premiere of South Korean film Victory by Park Beom-su, who attended the screening in person. In the 23rd edition 94 titles were screened in person. The film selection featured both contemporary and timeless titles from various Asian countries, as well as beyond, showcasing nine world premieres, 12 international premieres, and 38 North American premieres. Films from various genres from China, South Korea, Japan, Hong Kong, Taiwan, Thailand, Indonesia, Mongolia, Malaysia, the Philippines, Vietnam, and beyond were screened.

In Star Asia Awards category, Asian stars were honoured with various awards such as: Nicholas Tse a Hong Kong actor, singer, songwriter, entrepreneur and TV chef with Screen International Star Asia Award; Zhang Jianian (Tai Bo), Hong Kong and Taiwan film actor, with Screen International Star Asia Lifetime Achievement Award; Lee Hye-ri, a South Korean actress, singer, and television personality, with Screen International Rising Star Asia Award; and Kento Yamazaki a Japanese actor and model, with Best from the East Award.

The festival was closed on 28 July with Hong Kong director Soi Cheang's film Twilight of the Warriors: Walled In. A Malaysian co-production film Snow in Midsummer by Chong Keat Aun won the Uncaged Award for best feature film. It revolves around Ah Eng, a young woman, and her mother who lose contact with the father and brother of the former amid political riots. The Audience Award was awarded to Thailand film How To Make Millions Before Grandma Dies by Pat Boonnitipat, which follows M, a university dropout low on money and luck, volunteers to take care of his terminally ill grandmother in the hopes for an inheritance. In his closing speech the NYAFF Executive Director and President of the New York Asian Film Foundation Samuel Jamier said, "this year’s edition had "shattered expectations, we’ve witnessed an unprecedented 33% growth in both attendance and box office revenue, and one-third of our screenings sold out within days." He further said, "This year’s festival also showcased a broader range of narratives, from intimate personal dramas to epic historical sagas, reflecting the rich tapestry of Asian storytelling."

== Jury ==
Jury is composed of:

- Tony Bui: Vietnamese-born American independent film director in the United States
- Shao-yi Chen: producer, Screenworks Asia
- Shaina Magdayao: Filipino actress
- Felix Tsang: Sales & Acquisitions Manager, Golden Scene
- Chanon Santinatornkul: Thai actor
- Aliza Ma: Head of Programming, the Criterion Channel

== Screening venues ==
- Film at Lincoln Center
- Walter Reade Theater
- SVA Theatre
- Elinor Bunin Munroe Film Center, 144 West 65th Street
- LOOK Cinemas W57
- Korean Cultural Center New York

== Films showcase ==
Year	Title	Original Title	Country	Director	Premiere Status
Opening film
2024	Victory	빅토리	South Korea	Park Beom-su	World Premiere
Beyond Borders
2024	18×2 Beyond Youthful Days	青春18×2 君へと続く道	Japan, Taiwan	Michihito Fujii	North American Premiere
2024	A Balloon's Landing	我在這裡等你	Taiwan, Hong Kong	Angel Teng	International Premiere
2023	Fly Me to the Moon	但願人長久	Hong Kong	Sasha Chuk	North American Premiere
2023	Salli	莎莉	Taiwan	Lien Chien-Hung	East Coast Premiere
2023	The Time of Huan Nan	環南時候	Taiwan	Leading Lee	International Premiere
Centerpiece Presentation
2024	The Killers	더 킬러스	South Korea	Kim Jong-kwan, Roh Deok, Jang Hang-jun, Lee Myung-se	World Premiere
Closing film
2024	Twilight of the Warriors: Walled In	九龍城寨·圍城	Hong Kong	Soi Cheang	North American Premiere
China On the Move
2023	Brief History of a Family	家庭简史	China, France, Denmark, Qatar	Lin Jianjie	New York Premiere
2023	Carefree Days	逍遥游	China	Liang Ming	North American Premiere
2023	The Escaping Man	绑架毛乎乎	China	Wang Yichun	International Premiere
2023	Galaxy Writer	银河写手	China	Li Kuo, Shan Dandan	North American Premiere
2023	A Long Shot	老枪	China	Gao Peng	North American Premiere
2023	Snow Leopard	雪豹, གངས་གཟིག	China (Tibet)	Pema Tseden	New York Premiere
2023	Wolf Hiding	怒潮	China	Marc Ma	North American Premiere
Crowd Pleasers
2024	90 Years Old – So What?	九十歳。何がめでたい	Japan	Tetsu Maeda	North American Premiere
2024	Breaking and Re-entering	還錢	Taiwan	Leo Wang	North American Premiere
2024	Kingdom 4: Return of the Great General	キングダム 大将軍の帰還	Japan	Shinsuke Sato	International Premiere
2024	Let's Go Karaoke!	カラオケ行こ	Japan	Nobuhiro Yamashita	International Premiere
2024	Love Lies	我談的那場戀愛	Hong Kong	Ho Miu-ki	North American Premiere
2024	The Yin Yang Master Zero	陰陽師ゼロ	Japan	Shimako Satō	North American Premiere
Diasporic Discoveries
2024	Dìdi		United States	Sean Wang	New York Premiere
2015	Front Cover		United States	Ray Yeung	Special Screening
NYAFF 2024 Restored Classics
1984	Shanghai Blues	上海之夜	Hong Kong	Tsui Hark	Special Screening
1999	Three Seasons		United States, Vietnam	Tony Bui	Special Screening
Prime Picks
2023	12.12: The Day	서울의 봄	South Korea	Kim Sung-su	Prime Picks
2024	Escape	탈주	South Korea	Lee Jong-pil	Prime Picks
2024	Exhuma	파묘	South Korea	Jang Jae-hyun	Prime Picks
2024	The Roundup: Punishment	범죄도시4	South Korea	Heo Myung-haeng	Prime Picks
LGBTQ+ Visions & Horizon: Queer Unbound at NYAFF
2024	All Shall Be Well	從今以後	Hong Kong	Ray Yeung	East Coast Premiere
2024	A Balloon's Landing	我在這裡等你	Taiwan	Angel Teng	International Premiere
2024	Fish Boy	魚仔	Canada	Christopher Yip	New York Premiere
2015	Front Cover		United States	Ray Yeung	Special Screening
2024	Let		United States	Alyssa Loh	East Coast Premiere
2023	The Missing	Iti Mapukpukaw	PhilippinesThailand	Carl Joseph E. Papa	East Coast Premiere
2024	Pushup		South Korea	Ryu Ho-cheol	International Premiere
2023	Something Blue	夏天和陈路	China	Li Chen	World Premiere
2023	The Time of Huan Nan	環南時候	Taiwan	Leading Lee	International Premiere
2019	Twilight’s Kiss (Suk Suk)	叔．叔	Hong Kong	Ray Yeung	Special Screening
Standouts
2023	Brief History of a Family	家庭简史	China, France, Denmark, Qatar	Lin Jianjie	New York Premiere
2024	Bushido	碁盤斬り	Japan	Kazuya Shiraishi	North American Premiere
2024	Gold Boy	ゴールド・ボーイ	Japan	Shusuke Kaneko	North American Premiere
2023	Snow Leopard	雪豹, གངས་གཟིག	China (Tibet)	Pema Tseden	New York Premiere
Vanguards
2023	Be With Me	車頂上的玄天上帝	Taiwan	Hwarng Wern Ying	East Coast Premiere
2023	FAQ	막걸리가 알려줄거야	Kim Da-min	North American Premiere	
2023	The Missing	Iti Mapukpukaw	PhilippinesThailand	Carl Joseph E. Papa	East Coast Premiere
2024	Reversi		Malaysia	Adrian Teh	North American Premiere
2023	Supposed	สมมติ	Thailand	Thanakorn Pongsuwan	North American Premiere
2023	The Tenants	세입자	South Korea	Yoon Eun-Kyung	North American Premiere

== Uncaged Award for Best Feature Film Competition ==
Highlighted title indicates the Uncaged Award for best feature film winner.

Year	Title	Original Title	Country	Director	Premiere Status
The Uncaged Award nominees
2023	The Escaping Man	绑架毛乎乎	China	Wang Yichun	International Premiere
2024	Frankenstein Father	프랑켄슈타인 아버지	South Korea	Choi Jea-young	International Premiere
2024	How To Make Millions Before Grandma Dies	หลานม่า	Thailand	Pat Boonnitipat	North American Premiere
2023	Ichiko	市子	Japan	Akihiro Toda	North American Premiere
2023	Snow in Midsummer	五月雪	Malaysia, Taiwan, Singapore	Chong Keat Aun	U.S. Premiere
2024	Suffocating Love	愛的噩夢	Taiwan	Liao Ming-yi	North American Premiere
2023	Trouble Girl	小曉	Taiwan	Chin Chia-Hua	North American Premiere
2023	Women from Rote Island	Perempuan Berkelamin Darah	Indonesia	Jeremias Nyangoen	North American Premiere

== Films by country or region ==
Year	Title	Original Title	Director	Premiere status
Hong Kong Panorama
2024	All Shall Be Well	從今以後	Ray Yeung	East Coast Premiere
2023	Customs Frontline	海關戰線	Herman Yau	North American Premiere
2024	Fight for Tomorrow	拼命三郎	Chan Tai-Lee	U.S. Premiere
2022	Finding Bliss: Fire and Ice	尋找極致的喜悅：火與冰	Dee Lam, Kim Chan	Spotlight on 852 Films
2023	Fly Me to the Moon	但願人長久	Sasha Chuk	North American Premiere
2024	For Alice	給愛麗絲	Chow Kam Wing	World Premiere
2024	Inexternal	裡應外合	Yuen Kim-Wai	World Premiere
2024	Love Lies	我談的那場戀愛	Ho Miu-ki	North American Premiere
2023	The Lyricist Wannabe	填詞L	Norris Wong	New York Premiere
1984	Shanghai Blues	上海之夜	Tsui Hark	Special Screening
2024	Twilight of the Warriors: Walled In	九龙城寨之围城	Soi Cheang	North American Premiere
2019	Twilight’s Kiss (Suk Suk)	叔．叔	Ray Yeung	Special Screening
Korean Frontlines
2023	12.12: The Day	서울의 봄	Kim Sung-su	Prime Picks
2024	Escape	탈주	Lee Jong-pil	Prime Picks
2024	Exhuma	파묘	Jang Jae-hyun	Prime Picks
2023	FAQ	막걸리가 알려줄거야	Kim Da-min	North American Premiere
2024	Frankenstein Father	프랑켄슈타인 아버지	Choi Jea-young	International Premiere
2023	The Guest	301호 모텔 살인사건	Yeon Je-gwang	North American Premiere
2024	The Killers	더 킬러스	Kim Jong-kwan, Roh Deok, Chang Hang-jun, Lee Myung-Se	World Premiere
2024	The Roundup: Punishment	범죄도시4	Heo Myung-haeng	Prime Picks
2023	The Sin	씬	Han Dong-seok	North American Premiere
2023	The Tenants	세입자	Yoon Eun-Kyung	North American Premiere
2024	Victory	빅토리	Park Beom-su	World Premiere
Taiwan Transcendent
2024	18×2 Beyond Youthful Days	青春18×2 君へと続く道	Michihito Fujii	North American Premiere
2024	A Balloon's Landing	我在這裡等你	Angel Teng	International Premiere
2023	Be With Me	車頂上的玄天上帝	Hwarng Wern Ying	East Coast Premiere
2024	Breaking and Re-entering	還錢	Leo Wang	North American Premiere
2023	Old Fox	老狐狸	Hsiao Ya-chuan	East Coast Premiere
2023	Pierce	刺心切骨	Nelicia Low	North American Premiere
2023	Salli	莎莉	Lien Chien-Hung	East Coast Premiere
2023	Snow in Midsummer	五月雪	Chong Keat Aun	North American Premiere
2024	Suffocating Love	愛的噩夢	Liao Ming-yi	North American Premiere
2023	The Time of Huan Nan	環南時候	Leading Lee	International Premiere
2023	Trouble Girl	小曉	Chin Chia-Hua	North American Premiere

== Awards and winners ==
=== Uncaged Award for Best Feature Film ===
Year	Title	Original Title	Country	Director/Actor	Ref.
2023	Snow in Midsummer	五月雪	Malaysia, Taiwan, Singapore	Chong Keat Aun	
Special Mention
2023	Women from Rote Island	Perempuan Berkelamin Darah	Indonesia	Jeremias Nyangoen	

=== Audience Award ===
Year	Title	Original Title	Country	Director/Actor	Ref.
2024	How To Make Millions Before Grandma Dies	หลานม่า	Thailand	Pat Boonnitipat	

=== Daniel Craft Award for Excellence in Action Cinema ===
Actor	Country	Film/s	Ref.
Yugo Sakamoto	Japan	Baby Assassins: Nice Days	

=== Star Asia Awards ===
Image	Recipient	Country	Ref.
Screen International Star Asia Award
	Nicholas Tse	Hong Kong	
Screen International Star Asia Lifetime Achievement Award
	Zhang Jianian (Tai Bo)	Hong Kong	
Screen International Rising Star Asia Award
	Lee Hye-ri	South Korea	
Best from the East Award
	Kento Yamazaki	Japan	
