= Brief History of a Family =

2024 psychological thriller film

- Festivals release poster
- Traditional Chinese: 家庭簡史
- Simplified Chinese: 家庭简史
- Literal meaning: A Brief History of the Family
- Hanyu Pinyin: Jia ting jian shi
- Directed by: Lin Jianjie
- Written by: Lin Jianjie
- Produced by: Lou Ying; Zheng Yue; Wang Yiwen
- Starring: Zu Feng; Guo Keyu; Sun Xilun; Lin Muran
- Cinematography: Zhang Jiahao
- Edited by: Per K. Kirkegaard
- Music by: Toke Brorson Odin
- Production companies: First Light Films; Films du Milieu; Tambo Film
- Distributed by: Films Boutique
- Release dates: 19 January 2024 (Sundance); 17 February 2024 (Berlinale)
- Running time: 99 minutes
- Countries: China; France; Denmark; Qatar
- Language: Mandarin
- Budget: US$1.5 million

Brief History of a Family (Chinese: 家庭简史), is a 2024 psychological thriller film written and directed by Lin Jianjie in his feature directorial debut. The film, starring Zu Feng, Guo Keyu, Sun Xilun, and Lin Muran depicts a middle-class Chinese family in the post-one-child-policy era, who takes in their only son's mysterious new friend, triggering buried family tensions as secrets and feelings surface.

An international co-production, the film was selected in the Panorama section at the 74th Berlin International Film Festival and was screened on 17 February 2024 for its European premiere.

== Synopsis ==
Wei, an outgoing young man and the only son of a prosperous Chinese family, shares an unexpected bond with Shuo, his quiet and observant classmate, after an incident at their high school. This mysterious connection draws them closer, intertwining their lives. He introduces Shuo to his parents—a cell biologist father and a former flight attendant mother. Intrigued by Shuo's enigmatic charm, Wei's parents encourage him to spend more time with their family. As Shuo becomes increasingly integrated into their lives, he uncovers hidden layers beneath their seemingly comfortable existence. However, a tragic event shatters the fragile equilibrium, revealing old wounds and current fears. The family's facade begins to crack, and the true complexities of their relationships come to light.

== Cast ==
- Zu Feng as Wei's father
- Guo Keyu as Wei's mother
- Sun Xilun as Yan Shuo
- Lin Muran as Tu Wei

== Production ==
In the production phase, the project was presented at the industry event European Work in Progress, as part of the Film Festival Cologne 2022, where it won the mm filmpresse Award worth €7,500 for international festival public relations. The film made with a budget of US$1.5 million was financed by Doha Film Institute Qatar, Torino Lab and Films du Milieu. It was shot in Chengdu, Hangzhou and Beijing.

== Release ==
Brief History of a Family had its premiere in World Cinema Dramatic Competition at 2024 Sundance Film Festival on 19 January 2024. It had its European premiere on 17 February 2024, as part of the 74th Berlin International Film Festival, in Panorama. Films Boutique acquired the sales rights of the film.

The film was featured in Features section of the 71st Sydney Film Festival on June 7, 2024. The film was also screened in 'Horizons' at the 58th Karlovy Vary International Film Festival on 28 June 2024. The film was showcased in 'China on the move' at the 23rd New York Asian Film Festival on July 20, 2024. It was screened in 'Panorama' at the 2024 Vancouver International Film Festival on 26 September 2024. It also made it to the Meeting Point of the 69th Valladolid International Film Festival and screened on 25 October. It competed in 2024 Stockholm International Film Festival and was screened on 9 November 2024. The film was selected in the Foreground section of the 35th Singapore International Film Festival and was screened on 30 November 2024.

== Reception ==
=== Critical response ===
On the review aggregator Rotten Tomatoes website, the film has an approval rating of 92% based on 38 reviews, with an average rating of 7.4/10. On Metacritic, it has a weighted average score of 80 out of 100 based on 10 reviews, indicating "generally favorable reviews".

Elena Lazic of Cineuropa reviewing the film at Sundance Film Festival praised the director writing, "the debut feature from Chinese director Lin Jianjie, skillfully builds up suspense and a fascinating, morbid intensity by showing in minute detail how easy it can be to let societal demands for excellence threaten even the most sacred bonds." Concluding her review Lazic wrote, "An assured debut displaying a fantastic control of craft and a remarkably nuanced understanding of human psychology, the film dares to expose the serious strain that social and economic expectations put on a structure once meant to be a haven of love and support."

James Mottram of South China Morning Post rated the film 3.5/5 and wrote, "There are moments of real subtlety sewn into the fabric. The performances are rightly understated too, with Lin also smartly capturing the glistening urban backdrops – everything has a cold, impersonal sheen." Mottram compared the film to British actress-director Emerald Fennell’s 2023 black comedy psychological thriller film Saltburn, which incidentally also "features an interloper penetrating the confines of a well-to-do family." In end Mottram wrote, "Brief History of a Family is a film that leaves viewers with a disquieting feeling as the credits roll."

Carlos Aguilar, reviewing at the Sundance Film Festival for Variety, wrote, "Elevated by its consistent visual inventiveness... the closer we observe, the more it reveals itself as a tale of wish fulfillment for everyone involved."

John Berra of ScreenDaily giving positive review wrote that the film has "elusive quality and uniquely disquieting tone". Berra opined thar the "ambiguity is maintained through a finely modulated quartet of performances which are in-synch with the film’s technical elements." Concluding he wrote, that the film "is not so much of a critique of China’s middle-class as the conditions that have shaped its evolution."

On March 19th, 2025, the critic Leslie Felperin in The Guardian called the film an “exquisitely constructed drama”, praising as well “Zhang Jiahao’s sculptural cinematography and the sparse palette of composer Toke Brorson Odin’s score”, stating that for this fact alone it is “well-worth seeing in a cinema, not just on a small screen at home”.

=== Accolades ===
Award	Date	Category	Recipient	Result	Ref.
Sundance Film Festival	26 January 2024	Grand Jury Prize – World Cinema Dramatic	Brief History of a Family	Nominated	
Berlin International Film Festival	25 February 2024	Panorama Audience Award for Best Feature Film	Lin Jianjie	Nominated	
Miskolc International Film Festival	14 September 2024	Emeric Pressburger Prize	Brief History of a Family	Nominated	
Camerimage	23 November 2024	Director's Debut Competition	Jiahao Zhang	Nominated	
Camerimage	23 November 2024	Cinematographer's Debut Competition	Jiahao Zhang	Nominated	
Golden Rooster Awards	15 November 2025	Best Supporting Actor	Zu Feng	Nominated	
Golden Rooster Awards	15 November 2025	Best Writing	Lin Jianjie	Nominated	
