= 2018 Joox Thailand Music Awards =

Awarding ceremony given by JOOX Thailand

2nd JOOX Thailand Music Awards
- Date: 21 March 2018
- Location: KBank Siam Pic-Ganesha, Siam Square One, Bangkok, Thailand
- Presented by: JOOX Thailand

Highlights
- Most awards: The TOYS (3)
- Most nominations: The TOYS (5)

Television/radio coverage
- Network: JOOX App

The 2nd JOOX Thailand Music Awards was an awarding ceremony presented by JOOX Thailand, giving recognition to the Thai entertainment industry in the field of music for their achievements in the year 2017. Only the nominees in the main categories were voted upon by fans through the JOOX app. Voting period started on 9 February 2018 and ended on 28 February 2018.

The awards night was held at the KBank Siam Pic-Ganesha, Siam Square One, Bangkok, Thailand on Wednesday, 21 March 2018 and broadcast through the JOOX app.

== Awards ==
Nominations were announced on 22 February 2018. Winners are listed first and highlighted in bold:

=== Main ===
Song of the Year	Artist of the Year
**"หน้าหนาวที่แล้ว" (Nah Nao Tee Laeo) by The TOYS**; "ครั้งหนึ่งไม่ถึงตาย" (Krung Neung Mai Teung Dtai) by Klear; "เป็นทุกอย่าง" (Pen Thuk Yang) by Room 39; "The Devil" by Stamp; "หัวใจทศกัณฐ์" (Hua Chai Thot Kan) by Tachaya Prathumwan ft. Tossakan	**The TOYS**; Room 39; Klear; Chanakan Rattana-udom; Poy Portrait
New Face Artist of the Year	Pop Song of the Year
**BNK48**; YOUNGOHM; The TOYS; Gliss; Jinjett Wattanasin	**"หน้าหนาวที่แล้ว" (Nah Nao Tee Laeo) by The TOYS**; "เป็นทุกอย่าง" (Pen Thuk Yang) by Room 39; "หัวใจทศกัณฐ์" (Hua Chai Thot Kan) by Tachaya Prathumwan ft. Tossakan; "คนละชั้น" (Kon La Chun) by Jinjett Wattanasin; "ก่อนฤดูฝน" (Gaun Reudoo Fon) by The TOYS
Hip-Hop Song of the Year	Rock Song of the Year
**"เฉยเมย" (Choey Moey) by YOUNGOHM**; "Try To" by Maiyarap; "อย่าคิดมาก" (Ya Kid Mak) by The Others; "จีบ" (Jeeb) by UrboyTJ; "สบายดีหรือเปล่า 2017" (Sabai Dee Reu Bplao 2017) by Thaitanium	**"ครั้งหนึ่งไม่ถึงตาย" (Krung Neung Mai Teung Dtai) by Klear**; "เธอทำให้ได้รู้" (Tur Tum Hai Dai Roo) by Potato; "ไม่มีความรัก" (Mai Mee Kwahm Ruk) by Slot Machine; "โอ้เธอ" (O Ter) by Rangsan Panyaruen; "พัง...ลำพัง" (Pung... Lumpung) by Getsunova
Indie Song of the Year	Luk Thung/Pua Chewit of the Year
**"โลกที่ไม่มีเธอ" (Lohk Tee Mai Mee Tur) by Poy Portrait**; "วันหนึ่งฉันเดินเข้าป่า" (Wan Nueng Chan Doen Khao Pa) by Natthawut Jenmana; "เผด็จเกิร์ล" (Phadet Koen) by Tattoo Colour; "เกี่ยวกันไหม" (Kiao Kan Mai) by Waruntorn Paonil; "บันไดสีแดง" (Bun Dai See Daeng) by Hugo	**"คำแพง" (Kham Paeng) by Zak Chumpae**; "กลับคำสาหล่า" (Klab Kham Sala) by Mike Phiromphorn; "ผู้สาวขาเลาะ" (Phu Sao Kha Loh) by Lamyai Haithongkham; "กอดครั้งสุดท้าย" (Khot Khrang Sud Thai) by Ble Patumrach R-Siam ft. Tanya Rsiam
International Artist of the Year	K-POP Artist of the Year
**Ed Sheeran**; Dua Lipa; Bruno Mars; Taylor Swift; Sam Smith	**GOT7**; BTS; BLACKPINK; Taeyeon; EXO

=== Special ===
Music Video of the Year	Karaoke Song of the Year
**"The Devil" by Stamp**; "ทุกคนเคยร้องไห้" (Took Kon Koey Raung Hai) by Nakharin Kingsak; "ทำดีไม่เคยจำ" (Tum Dee Mai Koey Jum) by Cocktail; "มือลั่น" (Mue Lan) by JSPKK; "เข้ามา" (Khao Ma) by Daboyway	**"เรื่องที่ขอ" (Reuang Tee Kor) by Lula**; "อ้าว" (Ao) by Chanakan Rattana-udom; "ปลิว" (Plew) by Jannine Weigel; "พันหมื่นเหตุผล" (Pun Meun Hetpon) by Klear; "มือลั่น" (Mue Lan) by JSPKK
JOOX Icon Award
**Thongchai McIntyre**

== Multiple nominations and awards ==
Artists that received multiple nominations
Nominations	Artist
5	The TOYS
4	Klear
3	Room 39
2	Chanakan Rattana-udom
2	Jinjett Wattanasin
2	JSPKK
2	Poy Portrait
2	Stamp
2	Tachaya Prathumwan
2	YOUNGOHM

Artists that received multiple awards
Wins	Artist
3	The TOYS
