= Ploenchan Vinyaratn =

Thai artist

- เพลินจันทร์ วิญญรัตน์
- Born: Bangkok, Thailand
- Education: Central St. Martins
- Occupations: Textile artist, Contemporary artist, Textile designer
- Website: www.mookv.com

Ploenchan "Mook" Vinyaratn (Thai: เพลินจันทร์ วิญญรัตน์) is a Thai textile artist and contemporary artist and textile designer known for her use of sustainable materials. She is the founder of Beyond Living, a soft furnishings company. Her works have appeared in numerous galleries, including some being part of permanent collections.

== Early life and education ==
Vinyaratn was born and raised in Bangkok, Thailand. She attended Mater Dei School until the age of 13, prior to moving to England to continue her studies. Vinyaratn attended Ardingly College before completing a foundation course at Middlesex University. She studied Woven Textile at Central St Martins College of Art and Design, in London, England earning a Bachelor of Fine Arts degree with honours in 1995.

== Career ==
After graduating from Central St Martins, she began working as a senior designer for Mae Fah Luang Foundation (now Doi Tung Foundation) before starting Beyond Living, a home accessory and soft furnishing brand. Vinyaratn held her first solo exhibition, WOMB, at Serindia Gallery in Bangkok in 2015. Inspired by her pregnancy with triplets, the work was released under her pseudonym MookV. Her solo exhibition The Sea Ghost and Beyond was installed at the Nova Contemporary in Bangkok in 2020. The piece was made out of discarded fishing nets and other scraps collected from the sea.

In 2016, her installation Nestcape was selected as the entryway installation at the Marina Bay Sands, Singapore for Art Stage Singapore 2016. The installation blended traditional textile techniques with contemporary art forms. Her textile installation River of Kings was installed at the Louis Vuitton Boutique at ICONSIAM in Bangkok in 2018. This installation was created as part of a collaboration with Louis Vuitton's Architecture Department to develop a new store design concept for the ICONSIAM location.

In 2021, Vinyaratn's exhibition Swamped was displayed at Warin Lab Contemporary. The exhibition was created by weaving discarded materials into the installation in order to address environmental concerns. Her installation Woven Symphony was displayed at as part of a permanent collection at the Queen Sirikit National Convention Centre in Bangkok in 2022. The same year, her Adam's Bridge installation was also made a permanent part of that collection. In 2024 she had a solo exhibition titled Misfit at the Four Seasons Art Space.

=== Select solo exhibitions ===
- 2015 - Womb
- 2020 - The Sea Ghost and Beyond - Nova Contemporary (Bangkok)
- 2022-2024 - Woven Dialects
- 2023 - Tactile Vernacular
- 2024 - Misfit

== Influences and style ==
Vinyaratn's work is influenced by sustainability and use of unconventional materials in weaving. Her practice combines traditional textile techniques with contemporary design, often addressing themes of nature, transformation, and resourcefulness. She incorporates natural textures, patterns, and colors into her work, drawing from the environment as a primary source of inspiration. She frequently uses recycled and eco-friendly materials, such as paper yarn, aluminum from discarded cans, and other waste products, which she repurposes into woven artworks.

== Reception ==
Art & Market described her installation in "Swamped" as having an "indomitable presence that demands attention," emphasizing the impactful nature of her work in conveying pressing ecological issues. Vinyaratn's contributions include more than environmental themes. Her collaboration with Capella Bangkok resulted in the "River of Gold" installation, which Architecture + Design stated as "Crafted by the visionary Thai textile artist Ploenchan 'Mook' Vinyaratn, this piece doesn't just hang; it pulses, reflecting Bangkok's lifeblood in strands of gold that seem to ripple with the river's timeless whisper."
