= Bad Genius (Thai TV series) =

2020 Thai television series

- Promotional poster
- Thai: ฉลาดเกมส์โกง
- Genre: Crime thriller; Drama
- Created by: GDH 559
- Based on: Bad Genius (2017)
- Written by: Pat Boonnitipat; Tossaphon Riantong; Wasuthorn Piyarom; Thanida Hanthaweewattana; Sirada Trairungthatsana
- Directed by: Pat Boonnitipat
- Starring: Plearnpichaya Komalarajun; Jinjett Wattanasin; Sawanya Paisarnpayak; Paris Intarakomalyasut
- Theme music composer: Vichaya Vatanasapt
- Country of origin: Thailand
- Original language: Thai
- No. of episodes: 12

Production
- Executive producers: Jira Maligool; Vanridee Pongsittisak
- Producers: Jina Osothsilp; Suwimon Techasupinan; Vijjapat Kojiw; Chenchonnee Soonthornsaratul; Ruedee Pholthaweechai
- Cinematography: Boonyanuch Kraithong
- Editor: Foolhouse Production
- Running time: 53 minutes
- Production companies: GDH 559; Jor Kwang Films

Original release
- Network: One31; WeTV
- Release: 3 August – 8 September 2020

Related
- Bad Genius (Philippines)

Bad Genius (Thai: ฉลาดเกมส์โกง; RTGS: Chalat Kem Kong) is a 2020 Thai television series directed by Pat Boonnitipat, produced by GDH 559, and starring Plearnpichaya Komalarajun, Jinjett Wattanasin, Sawanya Paisarnpayak and Paris Intarakomalyasut. It is the television adaptation of the 2017 film of the same name, and premiered on One31 and WeTV on 3 August 2020, airing on Mondays and Tuesdays at 20:15 ICT and 23:00 ICT, respectively. The series concluded on 8 September 2020 with 12 episodes.

== Synopsis ==
Stealing a national test paper was the culmination of what began as exam cheating in the classroom for these students The drama reflects the widespread exam cheating among

== Cast ==
=== Main ===
- Plearnpichaya Komalarajun as Lynn
- Jinjett Wattanasin as Bank
- Sawanya Paisarnpayak as Grace
- Paris Intarakomalyasut as Pat

=== Supporting ===
- Saksit Tangthong as Vit, Lynn's father
- Apasiri Nitibhon as Headmistress Pornthip
- Ruengrit McIntosh as Ake, Pat's father
- Rasee Wacharapolmek as Wan, Lynn's mother
- Ratchanok Sangchuto as Bank's mother
- Siraphan Wattanajinda as Music
- Tonhon Tantivejakul as Ping
- Panachai Sriariyarungruang as Third
- Sadanon Durongkaveroj as Tong
- Sarut Vichitrananda as Mr. Sophon
- Claudine Craig as Claire
- Lawrence de Stefano as Mr. X

=== Guest ===
- Awat Ratanapintha, Ep. 12

== Production ==
The series was first unveiled during Tencent's launch of WeTV in Thailand in 2018. While the 2017 film it was based on focuses on efforts of the lead characters to cheat on the national exams, the series delved into their personal lives. Pat Boonnitipat directed the series along with a new set of characters and crew. At first, he was "hesitant to take on the project" but later accepted it as a way to improve his skills as a filmmaker. To get a perspective from different generations with regards to the action of the lead characters, Boonnitipat also included veteran actors like Apasiri Nitibhon, Willie McIntosh and Saksit Tangthong.

== Awards and nominations ==
Award ceremony	Category	Nominee / work	Result	Ref.
17th Komchadluek Awards	Best TV Drama/Series	Bad Genius	Won	
17th Komchadluek Awards	Best Screenplay	Pat Boonnitipat, Tossaphon Riantong, Wasuthorn Piyarom, Thanida Hanthaweewattana, Sirada Trairungthatsana	Won	
17th Komchadluek Awards	Best Director	Pat Boonnitipat	Won	
17th Komchadluek Awards	Best Leading Actor	Jinjett Wattanasin	Nominated	
17th Komchadluek Awards	Best Leading Actress	Plearnpichaya Komalarajun	Nominated	
17th Komchadluek Awards	Best Supporting Actor	Paris Intarakomalyasut	Nominated	
17th Komchadluek Awards	Popular TV Series	Bad Genius	Nominated	
12th Nataraj Awards	Best TV Drama Series	Bad Genius	Won	
12th Nataraj Awards	Best Team Ensemble	Bad Genius	Won	
12th Nataraj Awards	Best Director	Pat Boonnitipat	Won	
12th Nataraj Awards	Best Actor for Television	Jinjett Wattanasin	Nominated	
12th Nataraj Awards	Best Supporting Actress	Sawanya Paisarnpayak	Nominated	
12th Nataraj Awards	Best Supporting Actor	Paris Intarakomalyasut	Nominated	
12th Nataraj Awards	Best Television Screenplay	Pat Boonnitipat, Tossaphon Riantong, Wasuthorn Piyarom, Thanida Hanthaweewattana, Sirada Trairungthatsana	Won	
12th Nataraj Awards	Best Editing	Foolhouse Production	Won	
12th Nataraj Awards	Best Cinematography	Boonyanuch Kraithong	Won	
Siam Series Awards 2021	Popular Actor	Paris Intarakomalyasut	Nominated	
Siam Series Awards 2021	Popular New Artist	Plearnpichaya Komalarajun	Nominated	
Siam Series Awards 2021	Best Actress	Plearnpichaya Komalarajun	Won	
Siam Series Awards 2021	Best Actor	Jinjett Wattanasin	Nominated	
Asia Contents Awards 2021	Best Asian TV Series	Bad Genius	Nominated	
Asia Contents Awards 2021	Creative Beyond Border Award	Bad Genius	Won	
