= Jinjett Wattanasin =

Thai actor and singer (born 2001)

- จินเจษฎ์ วรรธนะสิน
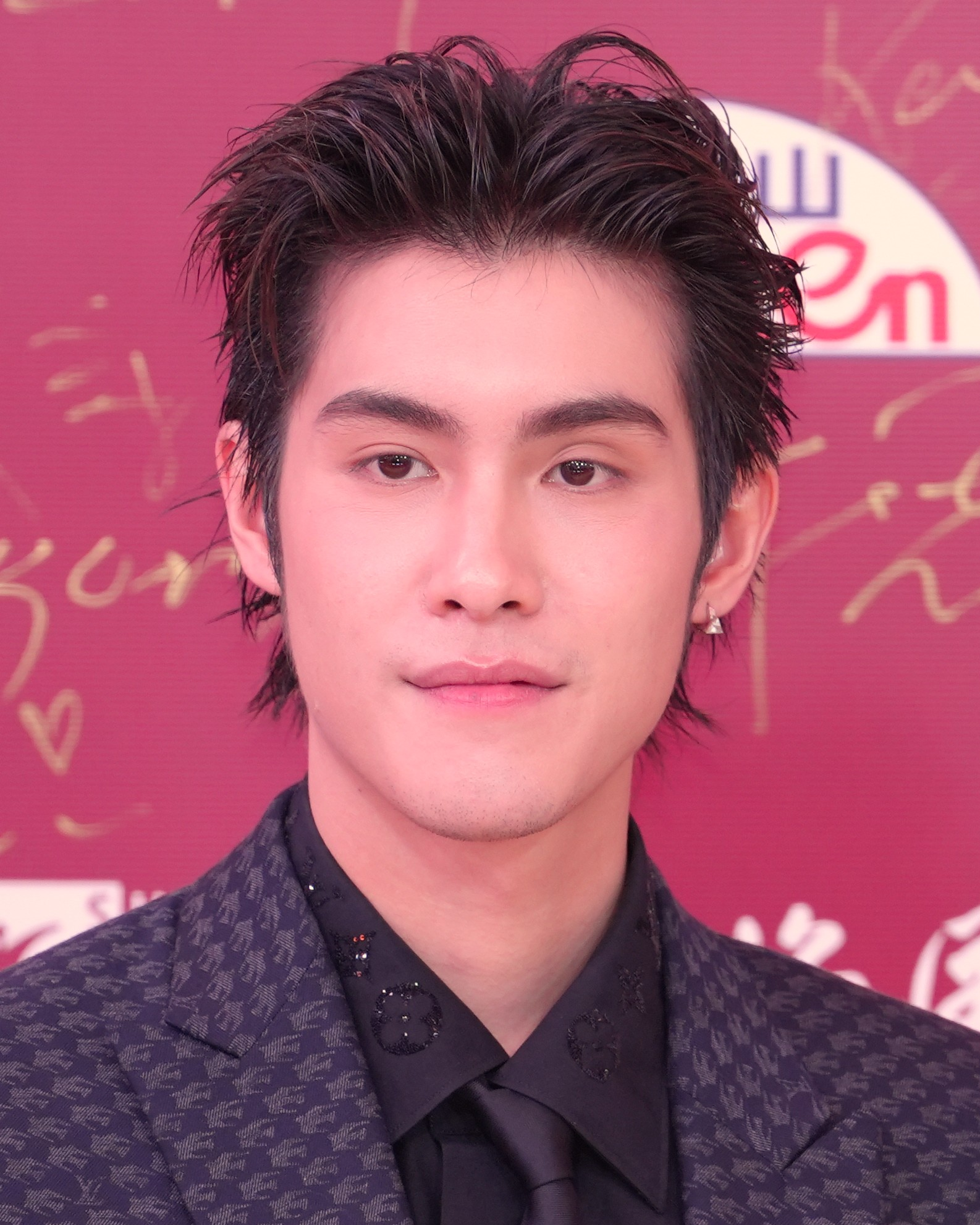
- Jinjett at 2026 Shanghai International Film Festival
- Born: 28 June 2001 (age 25); Bangkok, Thailand
- Other name: Jaonaay
- Occupations: Actor; singer
- Years active: 2017–present
- Agent: Jaymidi
- Known for: Bank in Bad Genius
- Height: 173 cm (5 ft 8 in)
- Parents: Jetrin Wattanasin (father); Kejmanee Pichaironnarongsongkram (mother)

Jinjett Wattanasin (Thai: จินเจษฎ์ วรรธนะสิน; born 28 June 2001), also known as Jaonaay (Thai: เจ้านาย), is a Thai actor and singer.

== Early life and education ==
Jinjett was born to singer Jetrin Wattanasin and actress Kejmanee Pichaironnarongsongkram. He is their eldest child along with his siblings namely Jakkapat Wattanasin and Jakara Wattanasin. He completed his elementary education at Ascot International School, his secondary education at Millfield School in Somerset, England and is currently taking up a bachelor's degree in music production at the British and Irish Modern Music Institute in London.

He grew up with music as he started playing drums at the age of 8 and later on with the keyboard and guitar. At age 11, he joined his siblings as they performed during their father's 20th anniversary concert in 2012. He was sent by his parents to study in a boarding school in England and started studying on year ten at Millfield School.

== Career ==
He started his singing career at the age of 16 under Jaymidi, a recording label owned by his father and debuted as its first artist with the song "คนละชั้น" (Kon La Chun) which its music video was shot in Krabi. When asked about its similarity with Justin Bieber's music videos, Jinjett admitted that he considers him as an inspiration being one of his fans. The song became an instant hit as it reached one million views on YouTube overnight and currently has more than one hundred million views. It also won as Song of the Year in the 2018 Nine Entertainment Awards. He later released several singles such as "แอบบอกรัก" (Aep Bok Rak), "ดึกแล้วอย่าเพิ่งกลับ" (Deuk Laeo Aya Phoeng Klap) and "เธอมีเขา" (Thoe Mi Khao).

His first venture into acting was when he was tapped to play the role of Bank in Bad Genius, a 2020 television adaptation of the 2017 film Bad Genius directed by Nattawut Poonpiriya. While Jinjett did not have any acting background unlike his co-lead actors and actresses, he got the help of the television series' director Pat Boonnitipat in honing his acting skills given the relevance of his character in the series. He also composed and sang "โกงรักไม่ได้" (Kong Rak Mai Dai), one the series' original soundtrack.

== Filmography ==
=== Television ===
Year	Title	Role	Notes	Ref.
2020	Bad Genius	Bank	Main role	
2023	DELETE	Tong	Support role	

=== Film ===
Year	Title	Role	Notes	Ref.
2025	The Stone	Ek	Main role	
2026	Gohan	Pelé	Main role	

== Discography ==
Year	Song title	Label	Ref.
2017	"คนละชั้น" (Kon La Chun)	Jaymidi	
2017	"คนละชั้น ชั้น ชั้น (Remix Version)" (Kon La Chun Chun Chun)	Jaymidi	
2018	"แอบบอกรัก" (Aep Bok Rak)	Jaymidi	
2019	"คืนที่ดาวเต็มฟ้า (Reproduced)" (Keun Tee Dao Tem Fah)	Jaymidi	
2019	"แอบบอกรัก (Remastered)" (Aep Bok Rak)	Jaymidi	
2019	"ดึกแล้วอย่าเพิ่งกลับ" (Deuk Laeo Aya Phoeng Klap)	Jaymidi	
2020	"เธอมีเขา" (Thoe Mi Khao)	Jaymidi	
2020	"โกงรักไม่ได้" (Kong Rak Mai Dai)	Jaymidi	
2021	"แปะหัวใจ" ft. Juné	Jaymidi	
2022	"Wink"	Jaymidi	

== Awards and nominations ==
Year	Nominated work	Category	Award	Result	Ref.
2018	"คนละชั้น" (Kon La Chun)	Top Talk-About Song	MThai Top Talk-About	Won	
2018	"คนละชั้น" (Kon La Chun)	Song of the Year	Nine Entertainment Awards	Won	
2018	"คนละชั้น" (Kon La Chun)	Pop Song of the Year	Joox Thailand Music Awards	Nominated	
2018	—N/a	New Face Artist of the Year	Joox Thailand Music Awards	Nominated	
2019	—N/a	Favorite Singer	Kazz Awards	Nominated	
2020	"คืนที่ดาวเต็มฟ้า (Reproduced)" (Keun Tee Dao Tem Fah)	Remake Song of the Year	Joox Thailand Music Awards	Nominated	
2021	Bad Genius	Best Leading Actor	17th Komchadluek Awards	Nominated	
2021	Bad Genius	Best Actor for Television	12th Nataraj Awards	Nominated	
2021	Bad Genius	Best Team Ensemble	12th Nataraj Awards	Won	
2021	Bad Genius	Best Actor	Siam Series Awards 2021	Pending	

== Personal life ==
Jinjett has a half-sister named Jayda Na Lamliang, his father's daughter with Miss Thailand 1992 1st runner-up Jidapa Na Lamliang (Gina). He is also the nephew of singer Jirayut Wattanasin (Joe), lead vocalist of the band Nuvo.
