= One Year (TV series) =

Thai television series

- Official series poster
- Thai: 365 วัน บ้านฉัน บ้านเธอ
- Genre: Family; Drama
- Screenplay by: Amaraporn Phandin-thong; Tossaphon Thiptinnakorn; Jiraporn Saelee; Jirasaya Wongsutin
- Directed by: Jirasaya Wongsutin
- Starring: Kathaleeya McIntosh; Sanya Kunakorn; Jirayu La-ongmanee; Cherprang Areekul; Plearnpichaya Komalarajun; Natara Nopparatayapon; Punsikorn Tiyakorn; Weeraya Zhang; Nannaphas Loetnamchoetsakun; Natticha Chantaravareelekha; Kunjiranut Intarasin; Pichayapa Natha
- Ending theme: สายซับ (Supporter) by BNK48; มปร (It's OK) by BNK48
- Country of origin: Thailand
- Original language: Thai
- No. of seasons: 1
- No. of episodes: 10 (+ 2 special episodes)

Production
- Executive producers: Jina Osothsilp; Jira Maligool; Wanridee Pongsittisak; Pichet Luekprecha; Kanop Supamanop
- Producers: Kriangkrai Vachiratamporn; Suwimon Techasupinan; Witchapat Kojiew
- Running time: 50–60 minutes
- Production companies: GDH; Jorkwang Film

Original release
- Network: Line TV
- Release: November 28, 2019 – February 6, 2020
- Network: One 31
- Release: January 18 – February 21, 2024

One Year (Thai: 365 วัน บ้านฉัน บ้านเธอ; RTGS: 365 Wan Ban Chan Ban Thoe; lit. 365 Days - My Home, Your House) is a Thai family drama television series produced through a collaboration between GDH and LINE TV. The series tells the story of two families who are required to live together for one year under a condition centered on happiness, exploring themes of love, understanding, and emotional growth. It premiered on LINE TV from 28 November 2019 to 6 February 2020, and later aired on Channel One 31. The series stars Katreeya English, Sanya Kunakorn, Jirayu La-ongmanee, and Cherprang Areekul, along with seven members of the Thai idol group BNK48.

== Plot ==
Tum, a widower with two children, decides to propose to Mook, a widow with four daughters, after their relationship becomes serious. However, Mook has not informed her children about the relationship. To introduce both families, Tum arranges for his children to meet Mook's daughters during Mook's birthday celebration. The meeting immediately creates tension, particularly between Petch, Mook's eldest daughter, and Baby, Tum's younger child. When Petch learns of Tum's proposal, the children are shocked and briefly run away from home.

After returning, Petch proposes a condition: both families must live together for one year, and if any member is unhappy, the relationship must end. Mook and Tum agree, and the families move in together. The trial period is marked by frequent conflicts, especially between Praewprow, Mook's youngest daughter, and Baby. A serious incident occurs when Baby gets lost, leading Praewprow to run away and live with Phum, Mook's ex-husband. At the same time, Phailin, Mook's third daughter, who left medical school due to academic pressure, openly rejects Tum's presence and later leaves the house as well.

While tensions persist, some relationships improve. Praewprow and Baby reconcile and begin to accept each other as siblings. Subplots develop, including a complicated romantic triangle involving Petch, Boom, and Tawan, as well as a secret relationship between Ploy and Mark, a famous actor, which later becomes public and leads to their breakup.

The situation reaches a turning point when Phailin learns that her father has become distant due to his new wife's pregnancy. Hurt and disillusioned, she runs away to live with her girlfriend. Tum searches for her, gains her trust, and helps her reconcile with the family. Despite this progress, conflicts among Petch, Boom, and Tawan cause the one-year agreement to collapse. In accordance with the condition, Mook ends her relationship with Tum, and both families separate.

Over time, unresolved feelings and misunderstandings are gradually resolved. Petch and Boom reunite after confronting their emotions honestly, and fractured relationships within the household are repaired. In the end, the two families come together once more. Mook marries Tum, and the extended family is finally able to live together in harmony.

== Cast ==
=== Main ===
- Kathaleeya McIntosh as Mooklada "Mook" Wongarunotai
  - Claudine Atitaya Craig as young Mook
- Sanya Kunakorn as Tum
- Cherprang Areekul as Nakananda "Petch" Wongarunotai
- Jirayu La-ongmanee as Boom
- Plearnpichaya Komalarajun as Tawan

=== Supporting ===
- Natara Nopparatayapon as Mark Pharich
- Punsikorn Tiyakorn as Ployyukol "Ploy" Assawaphromkun
- Weeraya Zhang as Pailin
- Nannaphas Loetnamchoetsakun as Praewprow
- Natticha Chantaravareelekha as Baby
- Kunjiranut Intarasin as Sai
- Pichayapa Natha as Jibby
- Ranya Siyanond as Dao
- Thitinun Chumphanee as Phum
- Chayanit Chansangavej as Kor-ya

== Production ==
The production of One Year was officially announced on 25 February 2019 at the BNK48 WE TALK TO YOU 2019 LINE-UP event, held at Siam Pavalai Royal Grand Theatre, Siam Paragon. A press conference for the series was later held on 21 November 2019 at Samyan Mitrtown.

Katreeya English and Sanya Kunakorn reunited for the series, marking their first television drama collaboration in over 20 years.

== Soundtrack ==
- "Sai Sub (Supporter)" – BNK48 (Cherprang Areekul, Kunjiranut Intarasin, Pichayapa Natha, Punsikorn Tiyakorn, Natticha Chantaravareelekha, Plearnpichaya Komalarajun, Nannaphas Loetnamchoetsakun, Weeraya Zhang)
- "Mor Por Ror (It's OK)" – BNK48 (Punsikorn Tiyakorn, Weeraya Zhang)

== Awards and nominations ==
Year	Award	Category	Nominee	Result
2020	2nd Asia Contents Awards	Newcomer Actress	Plearnpichaya Komalarajun	Won
2020	Asian Television Awards 2020	Best Original Digital Drama Series	One Year	Nominated
2020	Asian Television Awards 2020	Best Leading Female Performance – Digital	Katreeya English	Nominated
2021	LINE TV Awards 2021	Popular Couple Award	Weeraya Zhang; Kunjiranut Intarasin	Nominated
2021	LINE TV Awards 2021	Popular Drama Scene	"The one you said you still cannot forget…"	Nominated
2021	Nataraja Awards (12th)	Best Director	Jirasaya Wongsutin	Nominated
2021	Nataraja Awards (12th)	Best Supporting Actress	Katreeya English	Won
2021	Nataraja Awards (12th)	Best Supporting Actor	Sanya Kunakorn	Nominated
2021	Nataraja Awards (12th)	Best Ensemble Cast	One Year	Nominated
2021	Nataraja Awards (12th)	Best Television Screenplay	Amaraporn Phandinthong; Thotsaphon Thipthinnakorn; Jiraporn Saelee; Jirasaya Wongsutin	Nominated
