= Plearnpichaya Komalarajun =

Thai singer (born 2000)

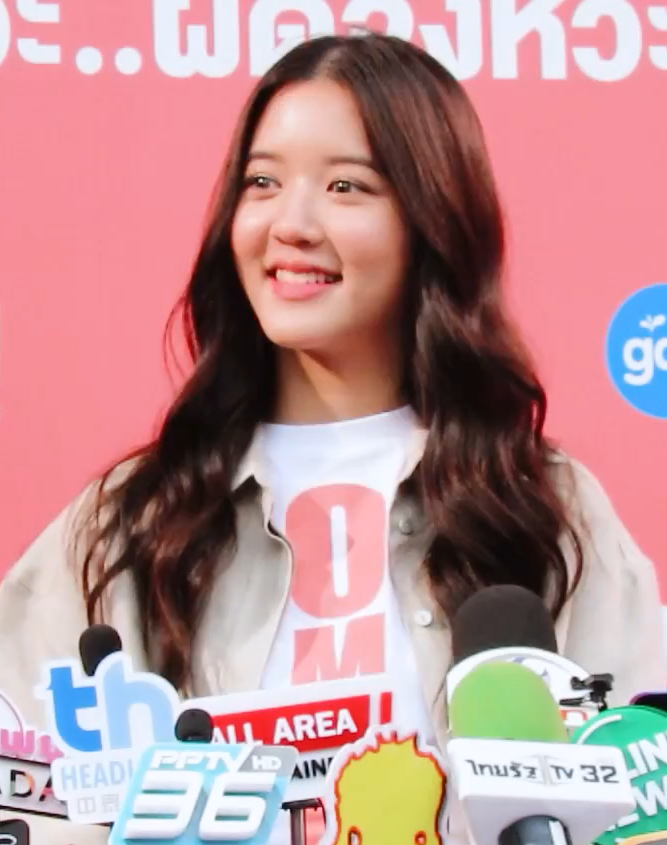
- Born: 4 July 2000 (age 26)
- Occupations: Singer actress
- Years active: 2018–present

Plearnpichaya Komalarajun (Thai: เพลินพิชญา โกมลารชุน, pronounced [plɤːn.pít.t͡ɕʰaː koː.má.láː.rá.t͡ɕʰun]), better known as Juné (จูเน่), is a Thai singer and actress known for her role as Lynn in Bad Genius.

== Personal life ==
Komalarajun was born on 4 July 2000 in Bangkok, Thailand, she was first known as "Pam", later renamed Juné, she is the second daughter of Paula Bharawan Aphithanakul – CEO of a company, and the owner of a chain of famous nationwide bread shops. Her maternal grandfather, Amorn Aphithanakul, is a powerful Sino-Thai businessman. In the early days of their careers, he supported former world boxing champions Khaosai and Khaokor Galaxy, since he also owned the Galaxy Restaurant and Nightclub on Rama IV Road in Sam Yan, where the twin brothers once worked as parking attendants while honing their skills in the ring, a place that ultimately gave birth to their ring name, "Galaxy". Besides her great family background, Juné also can speak many foreign languages including Thai, Russian and English, she learned Russian by being an exchange student at AFS Intercultural Programs.

== Career ==
She started her career at the Young Model Contest 2013, but did not win. In 2018, she joined the group BNK48 as a trainee, then was promoted to Team BIII 1 year later, performing at BNK48 Campus. In 2019, at the Senbatsu Sousenkyo general election for her 6th single, she placed 31st overall & appeared in the single "Beginner" with the song "Kimi no Koto ga Suki Dakara". In 2020, at the Senbatsu Sousenkyo general election for her 9th single, she ranked 15th overall & was a senbatsu in the main track of her 9th single- Heavy Rotation

She also starred in the movie The Sun, then One Year 365, and also appeared in the group's documentary BNK48: One Take. On 11 June 2020, she announced her graduation, through a live mobile session, to focus on acting, however she will still be a solo artist under the management of Independent Artist Management (iAM).

Then she played the role of Lynn in Bad Genius, to get the female lead Lynn, she had to compete to cast this role, fortunately she was the one who caught the eye of the director Pat Boonnitipat. When starting to make the first scenes, June encountered many difficulties when she could not convey the content of the script. During filming, Juné had to work very hard to fulfill her role well. When the series closed, director Pat Boonnitipat commented that Juné was the one who did the best out of the 4 main actors of the series.

She left BNK48 on 11 June 2020 to focus on her studies and her acting career.

== Filmography ==
=== TV series ===
Year	Name	Role	Channel	Notes
2019	One Year 365	Tawan	One31, LINE TV	Supporting role
2020	Bad Genius	Lynn	One31, WeTV	Lead role

=== Films ===
Year	Name	Role	Notes
2022	OMG!: Oh My Girl	June	Lead role
2024	Love Stuck	Vee	Lead role
2026	Delivery Man		Lead role
