= Pat Boonnitipat =

Thai director (born 1990)

- พัฒน์ บุญนิธิพัฒน์
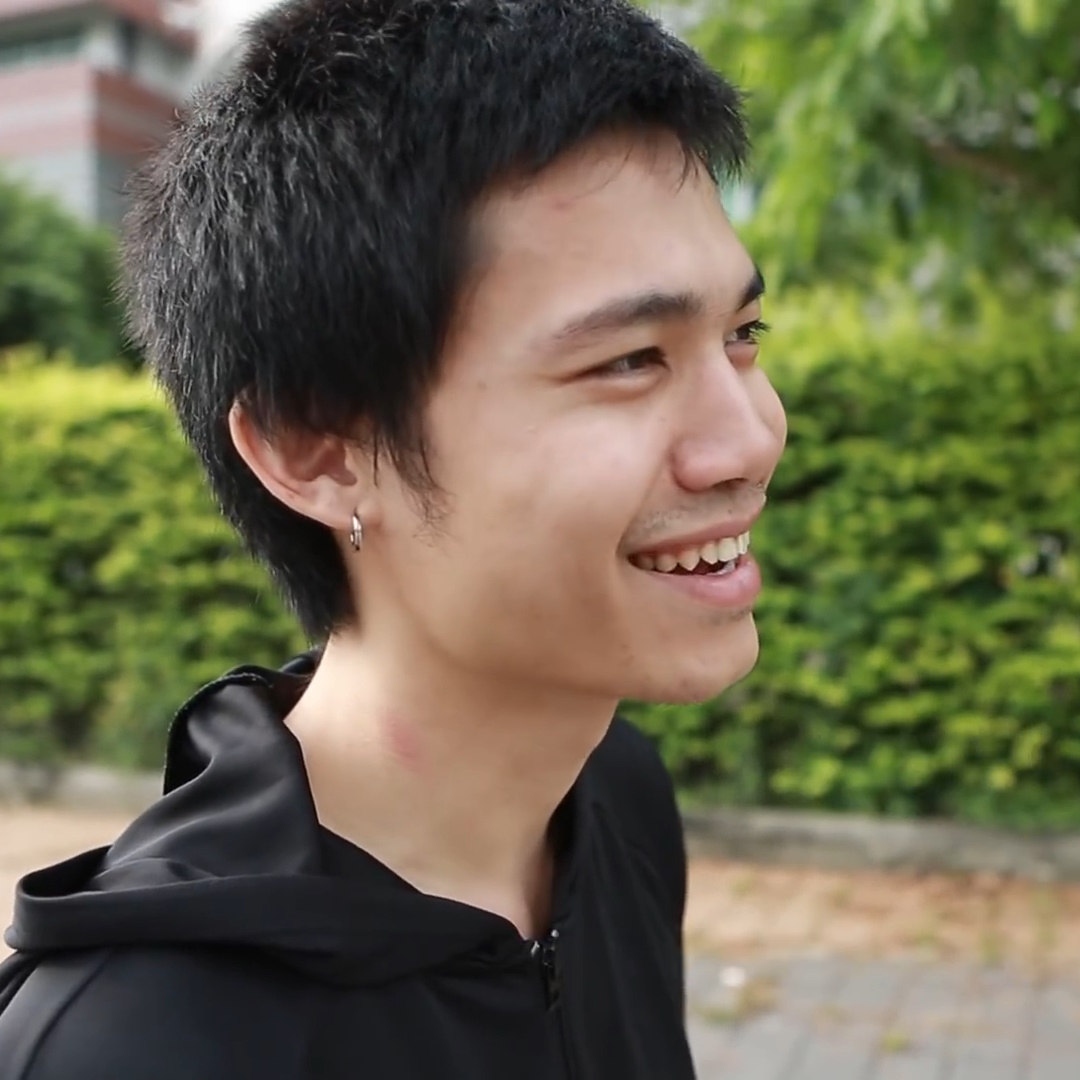
- Born: June 18, 1990 (age 36); Bangkok, Thailand
- Education: Faculty of Communication Arts, Chulalongkorn University
- Occupation: film director
- Employer: GDH 559

Pat Boonnitipat (Thai: พัฒน์ บุญนิธิพัฒน์; born June 18, 1990) is a Thai television and film director, working mainly with the film studio GDH 559. He is known for directing the TV series Project S and Bad Genius, as well as the 2024 film How to Make Millions Before Grandma Dies.

== Biography ==
Pat was born in Bangkok, Thailand, on June 18, 1990 into a Thai Chinese family, and is half Cantonese and half Hakka. Pat graduated school from Roong Aroon School and attained a bachelor's degree from the Faculty of Communication Arts at Chulalongkorn University. Although he majored in communications management, he developed an interest in filmmaking, and gained experience in camerawork through extracurricular activities. After graduating, he was invited by Songyos Sugmakanan to join the production of teen series Hormones as cinematographer. Hormones proved very popular and ran for three seasons (2013–2015), after which Pat was invited to co-direct GDH's comedy series Diary of Tootsies (2016) and also directed the TV documentary Let Me Grow (2016) for Siriraj Hospital's Psychiatry Department.

Following these works, Songyos and co-producer Kriangkrai Vachiratamporn invited Pat to take the lead director role for a segment of GDH's 2017 series Project S. He helmed the third segment, S.O.S, an exploration of major depressive disorder. After that, he was invited by GDH producers Jira Maligool and Vanridee Pongsittisak to direct the TV adaptation of the studio's 2017 hit heist thriller film Bad Genius, which was released in 2020 and won several categories at the Nataraja and Komchadluek awards. Pat was then again tapped by the producers to direct How to Make Millions Before Grandma Dies, his film directorial debut. The film was released in 2024 to tremendously positive reception, breaking box office records for GDH and for Thailand throughout Southeast Asia.
