= Vanridee Pongsittisak =

Thai film producer

Vanridee Pongsittisak (Thai: วรรณฤดี พงษ์สิทธิศักดิ์) is a Thai film producer. She works with the major Thai film studio GDH 559 (and its predecessor GTH), and is also a member of its board of directors. She has been described as the woman behind the success of GTH's films.

Vanridee graduated from the Faculty of Communication Arts at Chulalongkorn University, and joined GTH during its early days. She has worked on most of the studio's releases, mainly as a producer and script supervisor. She oversees most aspects of a film's creation, from conception and writing to marketing. Her supervisory role largely informed GTH's creative culture, which was a new direction for Thai cinema, where directors previously often doubled as producers and writers themselves and used to work more independently from a studio.
