= The Face (franchise) =

Reality series

- Created by: John de Mol Jr. Sebastiaan Spaan
- Original work: The Face
- Owner: Banijay
- Years: 2012–present

The Face is a modeling–themed reality television series that follows three supermodel coaches (mentor) as they compete with each other to find 'the face' of major brand. The original American version premiered in 2013 on Oxygen. The series is now an international franchise, with adaptations worldwide. Naomi Campbell is executive producer, serves as a supermodel coach, and chooses supermodel mentors for the American, British and Australian adaptations.

The show is well received in Asia, with Vietnam and Thailand both producing multiple seasons. Thailand has also launched a male-centric version of The Face Men and The Hair based on the original show. Vietnam has also launched The Face Online and many other spin-offs. On the other hand, some versions in countries like France, Canada, etc. have been canceled due to lack of investment. The Netherlands also has a show–The Look, but it is not the original format of The Face by Banijay.

As of 2025, The Face is present in five countries. Of these, two are still active. The rest are no longer active. The series has also found seventeen The Face–corresponding to seventeen seasons, around the world.

== International versions ==
Franchise with a currently airing season
Franchise with an upcoming season
Franchise that has ended
Cancelled franchise

Country	TV Show	Network	Host	Master Mentor	Mentor	Winners
Australia	The Face Australia	Fox8	Georges Antoni (1)	None	Cheyenne Tozzi (1); Naomi Campbell (1); Nicole Trunfio (1)	Season 1 : Olivia Donaldson
Thailand	The Face Thailand	Channel 3 (1–7); LINE TV (4–5); Netflix (6–7)	Utt Asda (1); Khun Chanon (2–4); Antoine Pinto (5); Ston Tantraporn (6-7)	Araya In-dra (5); Polpat Asavaprapha (5); Sabina Meisinger (5); Anne Thongprasom (6)	Lukkade Metinee (1–4); Ying Ratha (1); Ploy Chermarn (1,4); Bee Namthip (2–4); Cris Horwang (2–4); Marsha Vadhanapanich (3); Sonia Couling (4); Sririta Jensen (4); Maria Poonlertlarp (5–6); Toni Rakkaen (5); Gina Virahya (5); Bank Anusith (5); Anntonia Porsild (6–7); Pancake Khemanit (6–7); Cindy Bishop (7)	Season 1 : Sabina Meisinger; Season 2 : Ticha Kanticha; Season 3 : Grace Boonchompaisarn; Season 4 : Gina Virahya; Season 5 : Candy Tansiri; Season 6 : Bebe Polak; Season 7 : TBA
Thailand	The Face Men	Channel 3 (1,4); PPTV HD 36 (2); Thairath TV (3); LINE TV (2–3); Netflix (4)	Sabina Meisinger (1); Antoine Pinto (2–3); Thitisan Goodburn (4)	Lukkade Metinee (2); Chalermchatri Yukol (4)	Lukkade Metinee (1); Peach Pachara (1); Moo Asava (1–2); Sonia Couling (2); Toni Rakkaen (2); Akhamsiri Suwanasuk(3); Jirayu La-ongmanee (3); Araya Indra (3); Sabina Meisinger (3); Pancake Khemanit (4); Jumpol Adulkittiporn (4); Phakphum Romsaithong (4); Ananda Everingham (4)	Season 1 : Philip Thinroj; Season 2 : Luis Meza; Season 3 : Boss Darayon; Season 4 : Pom Kamonpop
Thailand	The Face Teen	TBA (1)	TBA (1)	TBA (1)	TBA (1); TBA (1); TBA (1)	Season 1 : TBA
United Kingdom	The Face	Sky Living	Simon Lenagan (1)	None	Caroline Winberg (1); Erin O'Connor (1); Naomi Campbell (1)	Season 1 : Emma Holmes
United States	The Face	Oxygen	Nigel Barker (1–2)	None	Naomi Campbell (1–2); Anne Vyalitsyna (2); Lydia Hearst (2); Coco Rocha (1); Karolina Kurkova (1)	Season 1 : Devyn Abdullah; Season 2 : Tiana Zarlin
Vietnam	The Face Vietnam	VTV3 (1–2); VTV9 (3–5)	Vĩnh Thụy (1); Hữu Vi (2); Nam Trung (3–4); Đỗ Mạnh Cường (5)	None	Lan Khuê (1–2); Hồ Ngọc Hà (1); Phạm Hương (1); Hoàng Thùy (2); Minh Tú (2); Võ Hoàng Yến (3, 5); Minh Hằng (3); Thanh Hằng (3); Vũ Thu Phương (4); Anh Thư (4–5); Kỳ Duyên (4); Minh Triệu (4); H'Hen Niê (5)	Season 1 : Phí Phương Anh; Season 2 : Nguyễn Bạch Tú Hảo; Season 3 : Mạc Trung Kiên; Season 4 : Huỳnh Thị Tú Anh; Season 5 : TBA

== Winners over time ==
Date	Winner	Age	Winning coach	Show & Season
April 25, 2026	Kamonpop "Pom" Kaewdiao	25	Jumpol Adulkittiporn	The Face Men Thailand; Season 4
August 30, 2025	Bianca 'Bebe' Polak	16	Khemanit Jamikorn	The Face Thailand; Season 6
August 13, 2023	Huỳnh Thị Tú Anh	21	Anh Thư	The Face Vietnam; Season 4
December 7, 2019	Twatchanin "Boss" Darayon	23	Jirayu La-ongmanee	The Face Men Thailand; Season 3
June 1, 2019	Candy Tansiri	23	Maria Poonlertlarp	The Face Thailand; Season 5
December 30, 2018	Mạc Trung Kiên	21	Thanh Hằng	The Face Vietnam; Season 3
December 9, 2018	Luis Meza	23	Sonia Couling	The Face Men Thailand; Season 2
May 12, 2018	Virahya "Gina" Pattarachokchai	25	Lukkade Metinee; Cris Horwang	The Face Thailand; Season 4
September 30, 2017	Nutthanaphol "Philip" Thinroj	22	Lukkade Metinee	The Face Men Thailand; Season 1
August 27, 2017	Nguyễn Bạch Tú Hảo	22	Lan Khuê	The Face Vietnam; Season 2
April 29, 2017	Natthaya "Grace" Boonchompaisarn	22	Cris Horwang	The Face Thailand; Season 3
September 3, 2016	Phí Phương Anh	19	Hồ Ngọc Hà	The Face Vietnam; Season 1
January 9, 2016	Kanticha "Ticha" Chumma	21	Bee Namthip	The Face Thailand; Season 2
January 10, 2015	Ajirapha "Sabina" Meisinger	20	Lukkade Metinee	The Face Thailand; Season 1
May 7, 2014	Tiana Zarlin	20	Anne V	The Face; Season 2
May 6, 2014	Olivia Donaldson	19	Cheyenne Tozzi	The Face Australia; Season 1
November 18, 2013	Emma Holmes	17	Naomi Campbell	The Face UK; Season 1
March 26, 2013	Devyn Abdullah	21	Karolina Kurkova	The Face; Season 1
