= The Face Thailand =

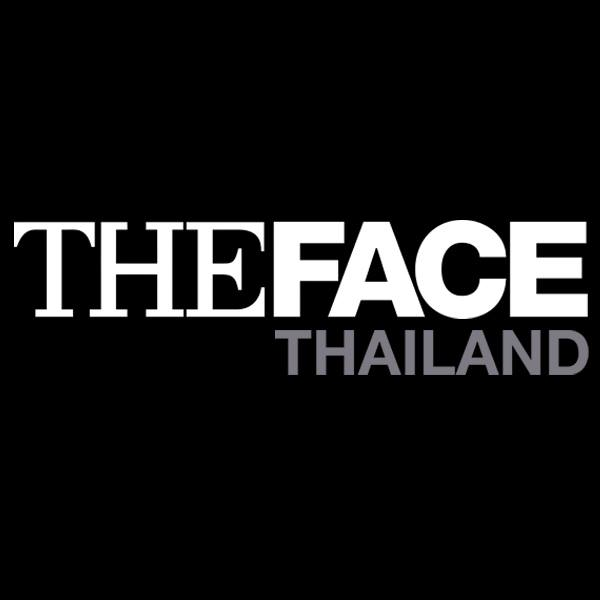
- Logo
- Genre: Competition
- Presented by: Utt Asda (1); Khun Chanon (2–4); Antoine Pinto (5); Ston Tantraporn (6)
- Judges: Lukkade Metinee (1–4); Ying Ratha (1); Ploy Chermarn (1,4); Bee Namthip (2–4); Cris Horwang (2–4); Marsha Vadhanapanich (3); Sonia Couling (4); Sririta Jensen (4); Maria Poonlertlarp (5–6); Toni Rakkaen (5); Gina Virahya (5); Bank Anusith (5); Anntonia Porsild (6-7); Pancake Khemanit (6-7); Cindy Bishop (7)
- Country of origin: Thailand
- Original language: Thai
- No. of seasons: 7
- No. of episodes: 52 (Not including 6)

Production
- Executive producer: Piyarat Kaljareuk
- Production locations: O.P. Place (1); DD Mall (2); The Face Thailand Studio (3–7)
- Running time: 105 minutes (excluding commercials)

Original release
- Network: Channel 3 (1–7); LINE TV (4–5); Netflix (6–7)
- Release: 4 October 2014 – 19 July 2025

Related
- The Face; The Face Men Thailand

The Face is a Thai reality television modelling competition series aired on Channel 3 In Thailand. Auditions for the show began on 23 August 2014. Aspiring contestants were required to be between the ages of 12 and 27, and meet a minimum height requirement of 170 cm (5 ft 7 in). The series began to air on television on 4 October 2014.

In 2017, they launched an international men version as The Face Men Thailand.

In 2018, they premiered The Face Thailand All Stars, where losing contestants from 3 previous seasons of The Face Thailand and The Face Men Thailand season 1 competed for a second chance to win the title. The season premiered on 10 February 2018.

== Hosts and mentors ==
Hosts	Seasons						
Hosts	1	2	3	4	5	6	7
Utt Asda	✔						
Khun Chanon		✔					
Antoine Pinto					✔		
Ston Tantraporn						✔	
Mentors	Seasons						
Mentors	1	2	3	4	5	6	7
Lukkade Metinee	✔						
Ploy Chermarn	✔			✔			
Ying Ratha	✔						
Bee Namthip		✔					
Cris Horwang		✔					
Marsha Vadhanapanich			✔				
Sonia Couling				✔			
Sririta Jensen				✔			
Maria Poonlertlarp					✔		
Toni Rakkaen					✔		
Gina Virahya					✔		
Bank Anusith					✔		
Anntonia Porsild						✔	
Pancake Khemanit						✔	
Cindy Bishop							✔
Master Mentors	Seasons						
Master Mentors	1	2	3	4	5	6	7
Araya In-dra					✔		
Moo Asava					✔		
Sabina Meisinger					✔		
Anne Thongprasom						✔	

Quit

- Marsha Vadhanapanich quit and was replaced by Cris Horwang in Episode 8.
- Ploy Chermarn quit in Episode 13.

== Seasons ==
Season	Premiere date	Winner	Runners-up	Other contestants in order of elimination	Number of contestants
1	4 October 2014	Sabina Meisinger	Mila Poomdit; Penny Lane	Jiksor Ubonratsamee, Pompam Rueangsilprasert, Jenny Akrasaevaya, Mei Rienrukwong, Park Jirajitmeechai, Ann Porsild, Hong Sirimat, Tarn Kunpiyawat, Belle Saibuapan & Carissa Springett & May Thanamethpiya, Sai Visuttipranee	15
2	17 October 2015	Ticha Chumma	Gina Pattarachokchai; Gwang Ormsinnoppakul	Looknam Kruythong, Namwan Wongtanatat, Jee Phisanphongchana, June Tongsumrit, Natto Pongkhan, Praew Naksuwan, Tiya Durmaz, Jazzy Chewter, Coco Suparurk & Jukkoo Klinchan & Linly Thongkam, Maprang Arunchot	15
3	4 February 2017	Grace Boonchompaisarn	Fah Sawangkla; Plengkwan Tongsen; Sky Hoerschler	Boongkie Rakkhapan, Metploy Jenjobjing, Maya Goldman, Prim Lodsantia, Khaw Kaewmanee, Blossom Roongpetchrat, Hana Chancheaw, Julie Anderson, Mint Samainiyom & Tia Taveepanichpan & Tubtim Labudomsakul,	15
4	10 February 2018	Gina Pattarachokchai	Attila Gagnaux; Prim Lodsantia; Darran Chanavarasutthisiri; Joseph Pirrera; Tia Taveepanichpan; Sky Hoerschler	Maprang Arunchot, Jukkoo Klinchan, Jazzy Chewter, Hana Chancheaw, Jenny Akrasaevaya, Hong Sirimat, Third Yoovichit, Fah Sawangkla, Namwan Wongtanatat & Niki Boontham & Sai Visuttipranee	18
5	23 February 2019	Candy Tansiri	Chompooh Prasanwan; Zorzo Akarakijwattanakul	Bill Sida & Emmy Sawyer & Liam Samuels, Mimi Kattiya, Posie Samuels, Tan Khamwachirapitak, Matthew May & Top Tunjaroen, Dream Suttiruk, Sia Okoye, Marcos Alexandre Jr., Eve Lertpitaksinchai & Greg de Bodt & Minnie Siangwong, Montra Tantawan	18
6	19 July 2025	Bebe Polak	Heidi Jensen; Gwang Wanpen	Tyra Lithiby, Amy Hounsome & Veniche Chansupasen, Rima Haasewinkel & Lita Niehus, Parker Phatthanasoon & Palmy Thitinan, Gail Chiaradisak & Mellamay Marcar & Miu Pholrachom & Amie Marks & Phoom Napatsara	15
7	10 October 2026	TBA	TBA	MJ & Kaikaew, Milan, Fern, Sonya, Jean, Aom & Mimi & Vanessa & Prikkang & Tawan; Still in the running: Oven, Gabi, Mew, Nina	15

Mentor's color symbols

Team Lukkade (Season 1–3)
Team Ploy (Season 1)
Team Ying (Season 1)
Team Bee (Season 2–3)
Team Cris (Season 2–3)
Team Marsha (Season 3)
Team Cris and Lukkade (season 4)
Team Bee and Rita (season 4)
Team Ploy and Sonia (season 4)
Team Maria (Season 5–6)
Team Toni (Season 5)
Team Gina and Bank (Season 5)
Team Anntonia (Season 6–7)
Team Pancake (Season 6–7)
Team Cindy (Season 7)

- In Season 3 (Episode 8), Marsha Vadhanapanich quit and was replaced by Cris Horwang, so Team Marsha's contestants Grace and Julie are also changed to be Team Cris in this episode.
- In Season 3 (Episode 9), Hana from Team Lukkade returned in Team Cris and Mint from Team Lukkade returned in original team.

== Thai representatives at Face of Asia ==
Color key

- Declared as Face of Asia
- Ended as runner-up
- Ended as one of the quarter-finalists or semi-finalists at Face of Asia

=== Face of Thailand ===
Contestant who appointed as Face of Thailand to represent Thailand in Face of Asia contest at Asia Model Festival

Year	Contestant	Province	Placement	Special awards
(South Korea) 2018	Peemsinee Sawangkla	Nonthaburi	Unplaced	Seoul Representative Model Award; Lui & Lei Cosmetics Award
(South Korea) 2019	Matthew Christopher May	Phuket	Top 10	Discover Seoul Pass Award
(South Korea) 2019	Pattirose Elizabeth Samuels	Chonburi	Unplaced	
