= Virahya Pattarachokchai =

Thai actress and model

- วิรายา ภัทรโชคชัย
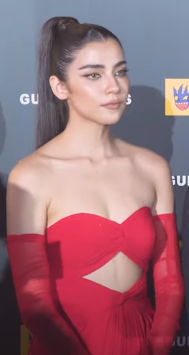
- Born: Varocha Pattarachokchai; March 24, 1992 (age 34); Ratchaburi, Thailand
- Other name: Gina
- Education: Rangsit University
- Occupations: Actress; model
- Years active: 2012–present
- Known for: The Face Thailand (s4) winner

Virahya Pattarachokchai (Thai: วิรายา ภัทรโชคชัย; born March 24, 1992), is a Thai actress and model, who was the runner-up of the second season and the winner of the fourth season of The Face Thailand.

== Early life and education ==
Pattarachokchai was born in Ratchaburi, Thailand. She is of Chinese, Thai and Turkish descent. She graduated from the Sacred Heart Convent School and received a bachelor's degree in Communication Arts from Rangsit University.

== Career ==
She entered the entertainment industry through modeling, starting her career in 2011 as a contestant in Thai Supermodel Contest 2011, where she was placed in Top 10 and won Body Perfect Award.

In 2016, she joined The Face Thailand season 2 as one of the contestants of Team Lukkade and she was runner-up with Wanpiya Ormsinnoppakul and signed a contract with Kantana.

In 2018, she joined The Face Thailand season 4 as one of the contestants of Team Cris and Lukkade and she won the competition.

In 2019, she became a mentor of The Face Thailand season 5 with Toni Rakkaen, Maria Poonlertlarp and Bank Anusith.

== Filmography ==
=== Television series ===
Year	Title	Role
2015	Miracle of Love Over the Horizon	Soo-min
2017	Rak Rai	Samornmhai Borirak
2017	Wang Nang Hong	Plern
2018	Ngoen Pak Phee	Rot (Guest)
2018	Tin Poodee	Sairung
2019	The Sand Princess	Aff
2019	Raeng Tian	Alice
2020	Plerng Phariya	Pimsuda
2020	Lah Tah Chon	Pat
2021	Khu Khaen Saen Rak	Mona (Guest)
2021	Irresistible	Duangdao
2022	You Are My Heartbeat	Thatha
2022	Saneha Stories Season 4: Thanon Sai Saneha	Cherry
2022	Mafia The Series: Guns and Freaks	Anna
2023	Phleng Rak Roi Khaen	Phloenphit (Guest)
2023	VIP	Phraeaphon
2025	Rabbit on the Moon	Phloen

=== Music video ===
Year	Song title	Artist
2015	เพียงหนึ่งครั้ง	The Yers
2016	ที่จริงเราไม่ได้รักกัน	MILD

== Awards ==
Years	Title	Award
2011	Thai Supermodel Contest 2011	Top 10 Finalist and Body Perfect Award by Scotch Edible bird's nest
2016	The Face Thailand season 2	Runner-up with Wanpiya Ormsinnoppakul
2016	Lemonade Awards	Fashion Nista
2018	The Face Thailand All Star	Winner

Awards and achievements
Preceded by Natthaya Boonchompaisarn	The Face Thailand; Season 4	Succeeded by Kulchaya Tansiri
