= The Face Thailand season 1 =

The Face Thailand
- Season 1
- Promotional poster
- No. of episodes: 13

Release
- Original network: Channel 3
- Original release: 4 October 2014 – 10 January 2015

Season chronology
- Next → Season 2

The Face Thailand season 1 premiered on 4 October 2014 and ended on 10 January 2015. Lukkade Metinee, Ploy Chermarn and Ying Ratha served as model coaches and Utt Asda served as a host for the first season.

The winner of the competition was Ajirapha "Sabina" Meisinger.

== Contestants ==
(ages stated are at start of filming)

Contestant	Age	Height	Hometown	Model Coach	Finish	Rank
Visutaphat "Jiksor" Ubonratsamee	19	1.75 m (5 ft 9 in)	Bangkok	Ploy	Episode 2	15
Nutsuda "Pompam" Rueangsilprasert	24	1.74 m (5 ft 8 1/2 in)	Bangkok	Ying	Episode 3	14
Aornicha "Jenny" Kaykham	21	1.70 m (5 ft 7 in)	Khon Kaen	Ploy	Episode 4	13
Siriluk "Hmei" Rienrukwong	20	1.75 m (5 ft 9 in)	Bangkok	Lukkade	Episode 5	12
Nattha "Park" Jirajitmeechai	25	1.72 m (5 ft 7 1/2 in)	Khon Kaen	Lukkade	Episode 6	11
Anntonia "Ann" Porsild	17	1.72 m (5 ft 7 1/2 in)	Bangkok	Ploy	Episode 7	10
Kansiri "Hong" Sirimat	19	1.73 m (5 ft 8 in)	Bangkok	Ying	Episode 8	9
Pratumwan "Tarn" Kunpiyawat	24	1.75 m (5 ft 9 in)	Bangkok	Lukkade	Episode 9	8
Palida "May" Thanamethpiya	23	1.78 m (5 ft 10 in)	Bangkok	Lukkade	Episode 11	7-5
Caroline "Carissa" Emma Springett	16	1.71 m (5 ft 7 1/2 in)	Chonburi	Ploy	Episode 11	7-5
Sasiwimon "Belle" Saibuapan	23	1.76 m (5 ft 9 1/2 in)	Bangkok	Ying	Episode 11	7-5
Jittima "Sai" Visuttipranee	24	1.71 m (5 ft 7 1/2 in)	Chiang Mai	Ying	Episode 13	4
Kriyahnie "Penny" Dasom Lane	19	1.72 m (5 ft 7 1/2 in)	Chonburi	Ploy	Episode 13	3-2
Thanapa "Mila" Poomdit	20	1.70 m (5 ft 7 in)	Surat Thani	Ying	Episode 13	3-2
"Sabina" Ajirapa Meisinger	20	1.75 m (5 ft 9 in)	Chonburi	Lukkade	Episode 13	1

=== Future appearances ===
Aornicha Kaykham, Kansiri Sirimat, and Jittima Visuttipranee returned for The Face Thailand season 4: All Stars. Sabina Meisinger also returned for The Face Thailand season 4: All Stars as special mentor, then, as Master Mentor for The Face Thailand season 5 and mentor for The Face Men Thailand season 3. Anntonia Porsild returned as a mentor for The Face Thailand season 6.

== Episodes ==
=== Episode 1 : Casting ===
First aired 4 October 2014

In the first week is to qualify for all 30 people to shoot and the next natural makeup to steer his team to three Mentor, it was decided by a shoot . The second round comes to makeup for the Mentor team selection and finalists 15 people.

- Team Lukkade : Park, Hmei, May, Tarn, Sabina.
- Team Ploy : Carisa, Penny, Jenny, Jigsaw, Ann.
- Team Ying : Sai, Mila, Hong, Belle, Pompam.

=== Episode 2 : Private Fashion Show ===
First aired 11 October 2014

- Winning coach and team: Ying Rhatha
- Bottom two: Park Jirajitmeechai & Jiksor Ubonratsamee
- Eliminated: Jiksor Ubonratsamee

=== Episode 3 : Tribe Style Costumes ===
First aired 18 October 2014

- Winning coach and team: Lukkade Metinee
- Bottom two: Pompam Rueangsilprasert & Penny Lane
- Eliminated: Pompam Rueangsilprasert

=== Episode 4 : Bounce Fashion Photoshoot ===
First aired 1 November 2014

- Winning coach and team: Lukkade Metinee
- Bottom two: Jenny Akrasaevaya & Hong Sirimat
- Eliminated: Jenny Akrasaevaya

=== Episode 5 : Into The Forest ===
First aired 8 November 2014

- Winning coach and team: Ploy Chermarn
- Bottom two: Mei Rienrukwong & Hong Sirimat
- Eliminated: Mei Rienrukwong

=== Episode 6 : Sporty Photoshoot ===
First aired 15 November 2014

- Winning coach and team: Ying Rhatha
- Bottom two: Anntonia Porsild & Park Jirajitmeechai
- Eliminated: Park Jirajitmeechai
- Special guest: Kan Kantathavorn

=== Episode 7 : Runway on Dinning Table ===
First aired 29 November 2014

- Winning coach and team: Lukkade Metinee
- Bottom two: Anntonia Porsild & Belle Saibuapan
- Eliminated: Anntonia Porsild
- Special guest: Puttichai Kasetsin

=== Episode 8 : Girls Night Out ===
First aired 6 December 2014

- Winning coach and team: Ploy Chermarn
- Bottom two: Sabina Meisinger & Hong Sirimat
- Eliminated: Hong Sirimat

=== Episode 9 : Triple New York Look ===
First aired 13 December 2014

- Winning coach and team: Ploy Chermarn
- Bottom two: Belle Saibuapan & Tarn Kunpiyawat
- Eliminated: Tarn Kunpiyawat
- Special mentor: Namthip Jongrachatawiboon

=== Episode 10 : Flying Pose ===
First aired 20 December 2014

- Winning coach and team: Lukkade Metinee
- Bottom two: Penny Lane & Mila Poomdit
- Eliminated: None

=== Episode 11 : Color Sensational ===
First aired 27 December 2014

- Winning coach and team: Ying Rhatha
- Winning campaign: Mila Poomdit
- Final three was chosen by Coach : Sabina Meisinger, Sai Visuttipranee & Penny Lane
- Fourth final was chosen by coach from winning campaign team: Mila Poomdit
- Eliminated: Carissa Springett, Belle Saibuapan & May Thanamethpiya

=== Episode 12 : Top 4 ===
First aired 3 January 2015

In this week's episode recap the final four contestants to talk about the last race.

=== Episode 13 : Final Walk ===
First aired 10 January 2015

- Final four: Sai Visuttipranee, Mila Poomdit, Sabina Meisinger & Penny Lane
- Winning campaign: Penny Lane
- Eliminated: Sai Visuttipranee
- Final three: Mila Poomdit, Penny Lane & Sabina Meisinger
- The Face Thailand: Sabina Meisinger

== Summaries ==
=== Elimination Table ===
Team Lukkade	Team Ploy	Team Ying

Place	Contestant	Episodes												
Place	Contestant	1	2	3	4	5	6	7	8	9	10	11	12	
1	Sabina	IN	IN	WIN	WIN	IN	IN	WIN	LOW	IN	WIN	LOW	IN	WINNER
2-3	Mila	IN	WIN	IN	IN	IN	WIN	IN	IN	IN	LOW	WIN	IN	RUNNER-UP
2-3	Penny	IN	IN	LOW	IN	WIN	IN	IN	WIN	WIN	LOW	LOW	WIN	RUNNER-UP
4	Sai	IN	WIN	IN	IN	IN	WIN	IN	IN	IN	IN	LOW	OUT	
5-7	Belle	IN	WIN	IN	IN	IN	WIN	LOW	IN	LOW	IN	OUT		
5-7	Carissa	IN	IN	IN	IN	WIN	IN	IN	WIN	WIN	IN	OUT		
5-7	May	IN	IN	WIN	WIN	IN	IN	WIN	IN	IN	WIN	OUT		
8	Tarn	IN	IN	WIN	WIN	IN	IN	WIN	IN	OUT				
9	Hong	IN	WIN	IN	LOW	LOW	WIN	IN	OUT					
10	Ann	IN	IN	IN	IN	WIN	LOW	OUT						
11	Park	IN	LOW	WIN	WIN	IN	OUT							
12	Hmei	IN	IN	WIN	WIN	OUT								
13	Jenny	IN	IN	IN	OUT									
14	Pompam	IN	WIN	OUT										
15	Jiksor	IN	OUT											

The contestant was part of the winning team for the episode.
The contestant was at risk of elimination.
The contestant was eliminated from the competition.
The contestant won the campaign individually.
The contestant was a Runner-Up.
The contestant won The Face.

- Episode 1 was the casting episode. The final fifteen were divided into individual teams of five as they were selected.
- In episode 9, Namthip Jongrachatawiboon replaced Ploy who was occupied by her event, but after the campaign, Ploy was back to the elimination process as Team Ploy's mentor.
- In episode 10, team Lukkade won the campaign. Ying nominated Mila while Ploy nominated Penny for elimination. Lukkade told both of the girls that they should not have been in the room because they were not the worst. Furthermore, she thought that there was an unfair nomination from one of the teams. Lukkade left the elimination without making her decision. The previews for episode 11, showed Lukkade talking with both of the mentors about their nominations. The fate of both of the nominated contestant remained unknown, as the episode ended in a cliffhanger.
- In episode 11, Mila won the campaign individually, automatically let team Ying choose another contestant. Lukkade, Ploy, and Ying were allowed to choose any one contestant to advance into the finale from the remaining seven models. Lukkade chose Sabina, Ploy chose Penny, and Ying chose Sai. After know team Ying won a campaign. Ying choose Mila as a final contestant who allow to a final runway. May, Carissa and Belle was eliminated.
- In episode 12, was the recap the final four contestants to talk about the last race.
- In episode 13, Penny won the campaign individually, Sabina, Penny and Mila were put through to the final runway show while Sai was eliminated.

=== Campaigns ===
- Episode 1: Natural Beauty Shots; Self Administered 'Transformations' (Casting)
- Episode 2: Private Fashion Show Modeling Accessories
- Episode 3: Photoshoot "Exotic Tribal Wear"
- Episode 4: Photoshoot Jumping on a Trampoline
- Episode 5: Fashion walking "Queen of the jungle"
- Episode 6: Photoshoot "Soccer for AIS" with male models
- Episode 7: Obstacle Catwalk for The Charity
- Episode 8: Short film "Girls Night Out Commercial" for MG 3
- Episode 9: Commercial for Maybelline
- Episode 10: Flying Pose for Samsung Gear S
- Episode 11: Maybelline Exclusive Look: Colcor Sensational Commercial for Maybelline
- Episode 13: Acting and Finalwalk
