= The Face Thailand season 2 =

The Face Thailand
- Season 2
- Promotional poster
- No. of episodes: 13

Release
- Original network: Channel 3
- Original release: 17 October 2015 – 9 January 2016

Season chronology
- ← Previous; Season 1 Next → Season 3

The Face Thailand season 2 began audition on 2 August 2015 at Royal Paragon Hall in Siam Paragon in Bangkok. Lukkade Metinee was reprised their roles as coaches again. Bee Namthip and Cris Horwang was the new coach in this season. Khun Chanon was a host replaced Utt Uttsada and Janie Tienphosuwan was a special coach in this season. The show was airing every Saturday 5:25 p.m. to 7:15 p.m. The socond season premiered on 17 October 2015 and ended on 9 January 2016.

The winner of the competition was Kanticha "Ticha" Chumma.

== Contestants ==
(ages stated are at start of filming)

Contestant	Age	Height	Hometown	Model Coach	Finish	Rank
Sakawrat "Looknam" Kruythong	23	1.77 m (5 ft 9 1/2 in)	Bangkok	Cris	Episode 2	15
Raknapak "Namwan" Wongtanatat	24	1.73 m (5 ft 8 in)	Bangkok	Cris	Episode 3	14
Nichayawee "Jee" Phisanphongchana	24	1.70 m (5 ft 7 in)	Bangkok	Bee	Episode 4	13
Natika "June" Tongsumrit	26	1.75 m (5 ft 9 in)	Krabi	Cris	Episode 5	12
Natthasinee "Natto" Pongkhan	19	1.75 m (5 ft 9 in)	Samut Prakan	Lukkade	Episode 6	11
Linladar "Praew" Naksuwan	20	1.76 m (5 ft 9 1/2 in)	Chonburi	Bee	Episode 7	10
Hathaichon "Tiya" Durmaz	15	1.75 m (5 ft 9 in)	Bangkok	Lukkade	Episode 9	9
Kirana "Jazzy" Jasmine Chewter	16	1.76 m (5 ft 9 1/2 in)	Bangkok	Cris	Episode 10	8
Apichaya "Linly" Thongkam	13	1.72 m (5 ft 7 1/2 in)	Rayong	Bee	Episode 11	7–5
Salita "Jukkoo" Klinchan	22	1.73 m (5 ft 8 in)	Samut Sakhon	Bee	Episode 11	7–5
Arayha "Coco" Suparurk	21	1.75 m (5 ft 9 in)	Bangkok	Lukkade	Episode 11	7–5
Jutiporn "Maprang" Arunchot	20	1.80 m (5 ft 11 in)	Chiang Mai	Lukkade	Episode 13	4
Wanpiya "Gwang" Oamsinnoppakul	23	1.73 m (5 ft 8 in)	Khon Kaen	Cris	Episode 13	3–2
Virahya "Gina" Pattarachokchai	23	1.75 m (5 ft 9 in)	Ratchaburi	Lukkade	Episode 13	3–2
Kanticha "Ticha" Chumma	21	1.70 m (5 ft 7 in)	Phuket	Bee	Episode 13	1

=== Future appearances ===
Raknapak Wongtanatat, Kirana Jasmine Chewter, Salita Klinchan, Jutiporn Arunchot, and Virahya Pattarachokchai returned for The Face Thailand season 4: All Stars. Pattarachokchai returned again as a mentor for The Face Thailand season 5.

== Episodes ==
=== Episode 1 : Casting ===
First aired 17 October 2015

In the first week is to qualify for all 50 people to shoot and the next natural makeup to steer his team to three Mentor, it was decided by a shoot . Contestants from 50 finalists who had to walk around 39 people . In the second round as a model for screening into three teams, Mentor was the decision by walking and the third round to make up for Mentor selected by a team of around 28 people coming through and finalists 15 people.

- Team Lukkade : Tiya, Coco, Natto, Gina, Maprang.
- Team Bee : Linly, Jee, Praew, Jukkoo, Ticha.
- Team Cris : Jazzy, Looknam, Namwan, Gwang, June.

=== Episode 2 : Beauty Shot ===
First aired 24 October 2015

- Challenge winner: Jee Phisanphongchana
- Winning coach and team: Bee Namthip
- Bottom two: Tiya Durmaz & Looknam Kruythong
- Eliminated: Looknam Kruythong

=== Episode 3 : Screen Test Music Video ===
First aired 31 October 2015

- Challenge winner: Gwang Ormsinnoppakul
- Winning coach and team: Bee Namthip
- Bottom two: Tiya Durmaz & Namwan Wongtanatat
- Eliminated: Namwan Wongtanatat

=== Episode 4 : Wonderful Pearl Cruise ===
First aired 7 November 2015

- Challenge winner: Gwang Ormsinnoppakul
- Winning coach and team: Lukkade Metinee
- Bottom two: Jee Phisanphongchana & Gwang Ormsinnoppakul
- Eliminated: Jee Phisanphongchana
- Special guest: Cindy Bishop

=== Episode 5 : Bed Side Story ===
First aired 14 November 2015

- Challenge winner: Gwang Ormsinnoppakul
- Winning coach and team: Lukkade Metinee
- Bottom two: Linly Thongkam & June Tongsumrit
- Eliminated: June Tongsumrit

=== Episode 6 : The Wedding Day ===
First aired 21 November 2015

- Challenge winner: Gwang Ormsinnoppakul
- Winning coach and team: Cris Horwang
- Bottom three: Praew Naksuwan, Maprang Arunchot & Natto Pongkhan
- Eliminated: Natto Pongkhan
- Guest mentor: Janie Tienphosuwan
- Special guest: Ananda Everingham

=== Episode 7 : Life is Thrilling ===
First aired 28 November 2015

- Challenge winner: Maprang Arunchot
- Winning coach and team: Lukkade Metinee
- Bottom two: Jazzy Chewter & Praew Naksuwan
- Eliminated: Praew Naksuwan

=== Episode 8 : Floating Catwalk ===
First aired 5 December 2015

- Challenge winner: Jazzy Chewter
- Winning coach and team: Cris Horwang
- Bottom two: Ticha Chumma & Coco Suparurk
- Eliminated: None

=== Episode 9 : Make Super Icon Happen ===
First aired 12 December 2015

- Challenge winner: Gwang Ormsinnoppakul
- Winning coach and team: Bee Namthip
- Bottom two: Tiya Durmaz & Gwang Ormsinnoppakul
- Eliminated: Tiya Durmaz
- Special guest: Janie Tienphosuwan

=== Episode 10 : Underwater Photography ===
First aired 19 December 2015

- Challenge winner: Ticha Chumma
- Winning coach and team: Lukkade Metinee
- Bottom two: Jazzy Chewter & Jukkoo Klinchan
- Eliminated: Jazzy Chewter

=== Episode 11 : Make Double Look Happen ===
First aired 26 December 2015

- Challenge winner: Coco Suparurk
- Winning coach and team: Lukkade Metinee
- Winning campaign: Gina Pattarachokchai
- Final three was chosen by Coach: Gwang Ormsinnoppakul, Gina Pattarachokchai & Ticha Chumma
- Fourth final was chosen by coach from winning campaign team: Maprang Arunchot
- Eliminated: Coco Suparurk, Linly Thongkam & Jukkoo Klinchan
- Special guest: Janie Tienphosuwan

=== Episode 12 : Are You Ready? ===
First aired 2 January 2016

In this week's episode reunion special. Looknam and June did not come in this episode.

=== Episode 13 : Final Walk ===
First aired 9 January 2016

- Final four: Gina Pattarachokchai, Maprang Arunchot, Ticha Chumma & Gwang Ormsinnoppakul
- Winning campaign: Ticha Chumma
- Eliminated: Maprang Arunchot
- Final three: Gwang Ormsinnoppakul, Ticha Chumma & Gina Pattarachokchai
- The Face Thailand: Ticha Chumma
- Winning coach and team: Bee Namthip

== Summaries ==
=== Elimination Table ===
Team Bee	Team Cris	Team Lukkade

Place	Contestant	Episodes												
Place	Contestant	1	2	3	4	5	6	7	8	9	10	11	13	
1	Ticha	IN	WIN	WIN	IN	IN	IN	IN	LOW	WIN	IN	LOW	WIN	WINNER
2–3	Gwang	IN	IN	IN	LOW	IN	WIN	IN	WIN	LOW	IN	LOW	IN	RUNNER-UP
2–3	Gina	IN	IN	IN	WIN	WIN	IN	WIN	IN	IN	WIN	WIN	IN	RUNNER-UP
4	Maprang	IN	IN	IN	WIN	WIN	LOW	WIN	IN	IN	WIN	LOW	OUT	
5–7	Coco	IN	IN	IN	WIN	WIN	IN	WIN	LOW	IN	WIN	OUT		
5–7	Linly	IN	WIN	WIN	IN	LOW	IN	IN	IN	WIN	IN	OUT		
5–7	Jukkoo	IN	WIN	WIN	IN	IN	IN	IN	IN	WIN	LOW	OUT		
8	Jazzy	IN	IN	IN	IN	IN	WIN	LOW	WIN	IN	OUT			
9	Tiya	IN	LOW	LOW	WIN	WIN	IN	WIN	IN	OUT				
10	Praew	IN	WIN	WIN	IN	IN	LOW	OUT						
11	Natto	IN	IN	IN	WIN	WIN	OUT							
12	June	IN	IN	IN	IN	OUT								
13	Jee	IN	WIN	WIN	OUT									
14	Namwan	IN	IN	OUT										
15	Looknam	IN	OUT											

The contestant was part of the winning team for the episode.
The contestant was at risk of elimination.
The contestant was eliminated from the competition.
The contestant won the campaign individually.
The contestant was a Runner-Up.
The contestant won The Face.

- Episode 1 was the casting episode. The final fifteen were divided into individual teams of five as they were selected.
- In episode 8, team Cris won the campaign. Lukkade nominated Coco while Bee nominated Ticha for elimination. Cris told both of the girls that she is mentor for the face not only for her team thus she didn't cut both of them. Furthermore, Cris just stole Ticha from Bee to join her team and that moment made her and Bee had the fight.
- In episode 11, Gina won the campaign individually, automatically letting team Lukkade choose another one contestant. Lukkade, Bee and Cris were allowed to choose any of contestant to advance into the finale from the remaining seven models. Lukkade chose Gina, Bee chose Ticha, and Cris chose Gwang. After knowing that team Lukkade won a campaign, Lukkade chose Maprang as a final contestant who then was allowed to do the final runway. Jukkoo, Linly and Coco were eliminated.
- In episode 12, was a reunion with contestants in this season. Looknam and June did not come to this part.
- In episode 13, Ticha won the campaign individually, Ticha, Gina and Gwang were put through to the final runway show while Maprang was eliminated.

=== Campaigns ===
- Episode 1: Natural Beauty Shots; Self Administered 'Transformations' (Casting)
- Episode 2: Beauty Shots with animals
- Episode 3: Music Video for Musketeers"
- Episode 4: Catwalk on Wonderful Pearl Cruise
- Episode 5: Photoshoot "Bed Side Story" with male models
- Episode 6: Obstacle Catwalk on staircase "The Wedding Day"
- Episode 7: Photoshoot "Life is Thrilling"
- Episode 8: Fashion walking on floating catwalk
- Episode 9: Fashion Video for Maybelline: Make Super Icon Happen

Team Lukkade as Madonna – "Vogue"
Team Bee as Beyoncé – "Crazy in Love"
Team Cris as Britney Spears – "Baby One More Time"

- Episode 10: Photoshoot "Underwater shooting"
- Episode 11: Online advertising for Maybelline Lip Gradation in theme "Make Double Look Happen"
- Episode 13: Acting and Finalwalk
