= The Face Thailand season 6 =

The Face Thailand
- Season 6
- Promotional poster
- No. of episodes: 8

Release
- Original network: Channel 3 Netflix
- Original release: 19 July – 30 August 2025

Season chronology
- ← Previous; Season 5 Next → Season 7

The Face Thailand season 6 is the sixth season of The Face Thailand. Premiered on 19 July 2025, and presented by Ston Tantraporn, it is the first season of the show in six years since Season 5. The audition process was occurred on 21 April to 24 May 2025, with the interview round held on 31 May 2025 at Kantana Company.

Maria Poonlertlarp, previously won Season 5, returns as the Mentor for the second time, along with two new Mentors, Khemanit Jamikorn and Anntonia Porsild. Actress Ann Thongprasom participates as the season's Master Mentor.

== Casting ==
Applicants must be female or identify as LGBTQ+, aged between 13 and 30 years old, with a minimum height of 165 cm, and of any nationality.

== Contestants ==
(ages stated are at start of filming)

Contestant	Age	Model coach	Finish	Rank
Tyra Lithiby	18	Pancake	Episode 2	15
Sirada Ameleine 'Amy' Hounsome	20	Pancake	Episode 3	14-13
Venita 'Veniche' Chansupasen	26	Anntonia	Episode 3	14-13
Kaliya 'Lita' Niehus	27	Anntonia	Episode 4	12-11
Chloe Akkarima 'Rima' Haasewinkel	15	Maria	Episode 4	12-11
Warisara 'Parker' Phatthanasoon	28	Anntonia	Episode 6	10-9
Thitinan 'Palmy' Suesamrit	29	Maria	Episode 6	10-9
Naphasakorn 'Gail' Chiaradisak	24	Maria	Episode 7	8-4
Melanie 'Mellamay' Marcar	21	Maria	Episode 7	8-4
Thanyares 'Miu' Pholrachom	21	Anntonia	Episode 7	8-4
Chalalai 'Amie' Marks	23	Pancake	Episode 7	8-4
Napatsara 'Phoom' Banluepromrat	24	Pancake	Episode 7	8-4
Amanda 'Heidi' Jensen	27	Maria	Episode 8	3-2
Kitchaya 'Gwang' Wanpen	24	Anntonia	Episode 8	3-2
Bianca 'Bebe' Polak	16	Pancake	Episode 8	1

== Episodes ==
=== Episode 1: Audition Awakening ===
First airdate: July 19, 2025

63 contestants will be selected to advance to the Top 15. The first round involves selection based on the mentors' first impressions. The second round is a natural-face photoshoot with the product. The third round is a runway walk with contestants' faces hidden. In the fourth round, mentors will select contestants to form three teams of four, resulting in the Top 12. After this, the show will offer a final chance to those who were not selected by mentors, allowing master mentor to choose one additional contestant for each team.

- Team Maria : Palmy, Gail, Mellamay, Heidi, Rima^{*}
- Team Antonia : Gwang, Parker, Miu, Lita, Veniche^{*}
- Team Pancake : Phoom, Bebe, Amie, Tyra, Amy^{*}

=== Episode 2 : Earth is not my home, haus of gloss ===
First airdate: July 26, 2025

- Winning coach and team: Antonia
- Winner of the campaign: Veniche Venita
- Bottom two: Mellamay malanie and Tyra Lithiby
- Eliminated: Tyra Lithiby
- Special guest: Kannarun Wongkajornklai, Thanawalai Watcharaphon, Dennis Karlsson and Cindy Bishop

=== Episode 3 : The real gang of bond girl ===
First airdate: August 2, 2025

- Winning coach and team: Maria
- Winner of the campaign: Bebe Polak
- Bottom two: Amy Hounsome and Veniche Venita
- Eliminated: Amy Hounsome and Veniche Venita
- Special guest: Nasit Wankhwan, Piyalert Baiyoke and Arachaporn Pokinpakorn

=== Episode 4 : Beauty shot in the rain ===
First airdate: August 9, 2025

- Winning coach and team: Pancake
- Winner of the campaign: Amie
- Bottom two: Lita and Rima
- Eliminated: Lita and Rima
- Special guest: Phornkamol Petchdasda, Sopon Gaethong, Chumni Thipmanee, Apiwat Yosprapan, Ornapa Krisadee and Sombatsara Teerasaroch

=== Episode 5 : Ready for the journey ===
First airdate: August 16, 2025

- Winning coach and team: Maria
- Bottom two: Phoom and Gwang
- Special guest: Apiwat Yosprapan, Vatanyu Ingkavivat and Polpat Asavaprapha

=== Episode 6 : The Divine light instinct of beauty ===
First airdate: August 23, 2025

- Winning coach and team: Pancake
- Bottom two: Parker and Palmy
- Eliminated: Parker and Palmy
- Special guest:: Somrutai Rattanawaraha, Wichayaporn Suksawat, Ruthaipat Surachaidungtawin, Christopher Washington, Matcha Mosimann, Sabina Meisinger and Usamanee Waitayanon

=== Episode 7 : A night of gloss and glam ===
First airdate: August 30, 2025

- Top 3 selected: Heidi, Gwang และ Bebe Polak
- Winner of the campaign: Heidi
- Eliminated: Mellamay, Gail, Miu, Phoom และ Amie

=== Episode 8 : Final walk ===
First airdate: September 6, 2025

- Winning coach and team: Pancake
- Winner: Bebe Polak
- Runner-up: Heidi & Gwang

== Summaries ==
=== Elimination Table ===
Team Maria	Team Anntonia	Team Pancake

Contestant	Episodes								
Contestant	1	2	3	4	5	6	7	8	
Challenge Winner	—N/a	Gwang	Heidi	Miu	Heidi	Gail	Amie & Bebe	—N/a	
Bebe	IN	IN	IN	WIN	IN	WIN	LOW	WIN	WINNER
Heidi	IN	IN	WIN	IN	WIN	IN	WIN	LOW	RUNNER-UP
Gwang	IN	WIN	IN	IN	LOW	IN	LOW	LOW	RUNNER-UP
Gail	IN	IN	WIN	IN	WIN	IN	OUT		
Mellamay	IN	LOW	WIN	IN	WIN	IN	OUT		
Amie	IN	IN	IN	WIN	IN	WIN	OUT		
Phoom	IN	IN	IN	WIN	LOW	WIN	OUT		
Miu	IN	WIN	IN	IN	IN	IN	OUT		
Palmy	IN	IN	WIN	IN	WIN	OUT			
Parker	IN	WIN	IN	IN	IN	OUT			
Rima	SAVED	IN	WIN	OUT					
Lita	IN	WIN	IN	OUT					
Veniche	SAVED	WIN	OUT						
Amy	SAVED	IN	OUT						
Tyra	IN	OUT							

The contestant was part of the winning team for the episode.
The contestant won the campaign for the episode and was part of the winning team for the episode.
The contestant won the campaign for the episode with other contestant and was same part of the winning team for the episode.
The contestant won the campaign for the episode but was not part of the winning team for the episode and was immune from elimination.
The contestant was at risk of elimination.
The contestant was part of the winning team and eliminated from the competition.
The contestant was eliminated from the competition.
The contestant was originally eliminated but was saved by Master Mentor.
The contestant was a Runner-Up.
The contestant won The Face Thailand.

== Notes ==
1. * Rima, Veniche, and Amy were not chosen by the three mentors but received 'The Last Chance' from the Master Mentor to advance to the next round. The Master Mentor chose Veniche for Team Antonia, Rima for Team Maria, and Amy for Team Pancake.
