= The Face Men Thailand season 1 =

The Face Men Thailand
- Season 1
- Promotional poster
- No. of episodes: 10

Release
- Original network: Channel 3
- Original release: 29 July – 30 September 2017

Season chronology
- Next → Season 2

The Face Men Thailand Season 1 began audition on 30 April 2017 at Muangthai GMM Live House at CentralWorld, Bangkok. Kantana Group and Channel 3 held a press conference on 29 June 2017, at Quartier Water Garden in The EmQuartier, Bangkok. Lukkade Metinee, Moo Asava and Peach Pachara served as model coaches and Sabina Meisinger the winner of The Face Thailand Season 1 served as a host for the first season. The season premiered on 29 July 2017. Contestants will live together in the residence called Artemis Elite and training every week by special guests, such as Personality & Charisma, Performing Skills, Health & Fitness. This reality program will exclusive on air only on LINE TV.

== Auditions ==
Casting calls will be held in Bangkok, Thailand on 30 April 2017. in F.A.C.E International Festival at Muangthai GMM Live House at CentralWorld, Bangkok. Aspiring contestants were required to be no older than 29 years of age, and meet a minimum height requirement of 175 cm (5 ft 9 in). The executive producer announced on his Instagram they are open casting for Thai and all nationalities of International Male Model.

== Contestants ==
(ages stated are at start of filming)

Contestant	Age	Height	Hometown	Model Coach	Finish	Rank
Phanupong "Bas" Buaphakham	21	1.80 m (5 ft 11 in)	Rayong	Peach	Episode 2	18
Thansap "Dui" Kanthasai	22	1.80 m (5 ft 11 in)	Ratchaburi	Peach	Episode 3	17
Nakharin "Gun" Phanwong	19	1.86 m (6 ft 1 in)	Khon Kaen	Lukkade	Episode 5	16
Anusith "Bank" Sangnimnuan	26	1.89 m (6 ft 2 1/2 in)	Bangkok	Moo	Episode 6	15
Niki Boontham	21	1.90 m (6 ft 3 in)	Chonburi	Lukkade	Episode 7	14-12
Thime Pichitsurakij	16	1.84 m (6 ft 1/2 in)	Bangkok	Moo	Episode 7	14-12
Pasakorn "PK" Vanasirikul^{[a]}	20	1.80 m (5 ft 11 in)	Bangkok	Peach	Episode 7	14-12
Qiucheng "Jack" Su	27	1.85 m (6 ft 1 in)	Yangzhou, China	Lukkade	Episode 7	11
Kittikun "Kun" Tansuhas	26	1.81 m (5 ft 11 1/2 in)	Chiang Mai	Lukkade	Episode 8	10
Pichet "Mos" Priabyodying	22	1.87 m (6 ft 1 1/2 in)	Surin	Lukkade	Episode 9	9-6
Phenphit "Sam" Boonhor	23	1.88 m (6 ft 2 in)	Nakhon Ratchasima	Moo	Episode 9	9-6
Nol "Mickey" Allapach Na Pombhejara	26	1.80 m (5 ft 11 in)	Los Angeles, United States	Moo	Episode 9	9-6
Sorawis "Gunn" Saengvanich	22	1.88 m (6 ft 2 in)	Bangkok	Peach	Episode 9	9-6
Tanaphop "Third" Yoovichit	19	1.85 m (6 ft 1 in)	Bangkok	Moo	Episode 10	5-4
Joseph Angelo	23	1.80 m (5 ft 11 in)	Khon Kaen	Peach	Episode 10	5-4
Arthur "Attila" Apichaht Gagnaux	25	1.88 m (6 ft 2 in)	Geneva, Switzerland	Moo	Episode 10	3-2
Trisanu "Man" Soranun^{[b]}	26	1.90 m (6 ft 3 in)	Bangkok	Peach	Episode 10	3-2
Nutthanaphol "Philip" Thinroj	22	1.80 m (5 ft 11 in)	Stockholm, Sweden	Lukkade	Episode 10	1

=== Future appearances ===
Niki Boontham, Tanaphop Yoovichit, Joseph Angelo, and Arthur Apichaht Gagnaux returned for The Face Thailand season 4: All Stars. Anusith Sangnimnuan returned as a mentor for The Face Thailand season 5.

== Episodes ==
=== Episode 1 : Casting ===
First aired 29 July 2017

In the first week is to qualify for all 41 people to shoot and the next natural makeup to steer his team to three Mentor, it was decided by a shoot. Contestants from 41 finalists who had to walk around 28 people. In the second round as a model for screening into three teams, Mentor was the decision by walking and the third round to make up for Mentor selected by a team of around 24 people coming through and finalists 18 people.

- Team Lukkade : Jack, Niki, Gun, Philip, Mos, Kun.
- Team Moo : Thime, Sam, Bank, Mickey, Attila, Third.
- Team Peach : Dui, Bas, Gunn, Man, PK, Joseph Angelo.

=== Episode 2 : Sensitive Side of Men ===
First aired 5 August 2017

- Winning coach and team: Lukkade Metinee
- Bottom two: Third Yoovichit & Bas Buaphakham
- Eliminated: Bas Buaphakham

=== Episode 3 : Walk Your Pets ===
First aired 12 August 2017

- Winning coach and team: Moo Asava
- Bottom two: Kun Tansuhas & Dui Kanthasai
- Eliminated: Dui Kanthasai
- Special guest: Cris Horwang

=== Episode 4 : Confident in Love ===
First aired 19 August 2017

- Winning coach and team: Lukkade Metinee
- Bottom two: Bank Sangnimnuan & Gunn Saengvanich
- Eliminated: None
- Special guest: Natthaya Boonchompaisarn

=== Episode 5 : Locker Room ===
First aired 26 August 2017

- Winning coach and team: Moo Asava
- Bottom two: Gun Phanwong & PK Vanasirikul
- Eliminated: Gun Phanwong

=== Episode 6 : Victory Walk ===
First aired 2 September 2017

- Winning coach and team: Lukkade Metinee
- Bottom four: Mickey Na Pombhejara & Sam Boonhor & Bank Sangnimnuan & Gunn Saengvanich
- Eliminated: Bank Sangnimnuan
- Special guest: Chalita Suansane & Chanon Ukkharachata

=== Episode 7 : Newly Wet Couple ===
First aired 9 September 2017

- Winning coach and team: Moo Asava
- Bottom two: Jack Su & Gunn Saengvanich
- Eliminated: Jack Su
- Eliminated outside of the Elimination room: Niki Boontham, Thime Pichitsurakij & PK Vanasirikul
- Special guest: Wanpiya Ormsinnoppakul, Jazzy Chewter, Maria Hoerschler & Mario Maurer

=== Episode 8 : Alpha Move by Alpha Men ===
First aired 16 September 2017

- Winning coach and team: Moo Asava
- Bottom two: Kun Tansuhas & Gunn Saengvanich
- Eliminated: Kun Tansuhas
- Special mentor: Mom Rajawongse Srikhumrung Yukol Rattakul

=== Episode 9 : Body Pose ===
First aired 23 September 2017

- Winning coach and team: Moo Asava & Peach Pachara
- Winning campaign: Attila Gagnaux & Joseph Angelo
- Final three was chosen by Coach: Philip Thinroj, Attila Gagnaux & Man Soranun
- Fourth and Fifth final was chosen by coach from winning campaign team: Third Yoovichit & Joseph Angelo
- Eliminated: Mos Priabyodying, Sam Boonhor, Mickey Na Pombhejara & Gunn Saengvanich

=== Episode 10 : Final Walk ===
First aired 30 September 2017

- Final five: Philip Thinroj, Attila Gagnaux, Third Yoovichit, Joseph Angelo & Man Soranun
- Winning campaign: Joseph Angelo
- Eliminated: Third Yoovichit & Joseph Angelo
- Final three: Philip Thinroj, Attila Gagnaux & Man Soranun
- The Face Men Thailand: Philip Thinroj
- Winning coach and team: Lukkade Metinee

== Summaries ==
=== Elimination Table ===
Team Lukkade	Team Moo	Team Peach

Contestant	Episodes										
Contestant	1	2	3	4	5	6	7	8	9	10	
Challenge Winner	—N/a	Bank	Niki	Mickey	Niki	Mos	Philip	Man	Man	—N/a	
Philip	IN	WIN	IN	WIN	IN	WIN	IN	IN	LOW	IN	WINNER
Man	IN	IN	IN	IN	IN	IN	IN	IN	LOW	IN	RUNNER-UP
Attila	IN	IN	WIN	IN	WIN	IN	WIN	WIN	WIN	IN	RUNNER-UP
Joseph Angelo	IN	IN	IN	IN	IN	IN	IN	IN	WIN	OUT	
Third	IN	LOW	WIN	IN	WIN	IN	WIN	WIN	LOW	OUT	
Mos	IN	WIN	IN	WIN	IN	WIN	IN	IN	OUT		
Mickey	IN	IN	WIN	IN	WIN	LOW	WIN	WIN	OUT		
Sam	IN	IN	WIN	IN	WIN	LOW	WIN	WIN	OUT		
Gunn	IN	IN	IN	LOW	IN	LOW	LOW	LOW	OUT		
Kun	IN	WIN	LOW	WIN	IN	WIN	IN	OUT			
Jack	IN	WIN	IN	WIN	IN	WIN	OUT				
Niki	IN	WIN	IN	WIN	IN	WIN	OUT				
PK	IN	IN	IN	IN	LOW	IN	OUT				
Thime	IN	IN	WIN	IN	WIN	IN	OUT				
Bank	IN	IN	WIN	LOW	WIN	OUT					
Gun	IN	WIN	IN	WIN	OUT						
Dui	IN	IN	OUT								
Bas	IN	OUT									

The contestant was part of the winning team for the episode.
The contestant was at risk of elimination.
The contestant was eliminated from the competition.
The contestant was eliminated outside of the elimination room by their mentors.
The contestant won the campaign for the episode with contestant of other team and selected to the final walk round by their mentors.
The contestant won the campaign for the episode but was eliminated in the final walk round.
The contestant was a Runner-Up.
The contestant won The Face Men.

- Episode 1 was the casting episode. The final eighteen were divided into individual teams of six as they were selected.
- In episode 4, team Lukkade won the campaign. Moo nominated Bank while Peach nominated Gunn for the elimination. Lukkade didn't cut both of them.
- In episode 6, team Lukkade won the campaign. Moo nominated three contestants: Bank, Mickey and Sam at the same time for the elimination. Lukkade decided to cut Bank.
- In episode 7, Lukkade, Moo and Peach were asked to choose any one contestant to eliminate from the remaining from their team. Lukkade chose Niki, Moo chose Thime, and Peach chose PK respectively.
- In episode 8, Mom Rajawongse Srikhumrung Yukol Rattakul (Khun Ying Mangmoom) replaced Moo who was occupied by his illness, but after the campaign, Moo was back to the elimination process as Team Moo's mentor.
- In episode 9, Attila and Joseph Angelo won the campaign individually. Team Moo and Team Peach are automatically allowed to choose another contestant. Lukkade, Moo and Peach were allowed to choose any one contestant to advance into the finale from the remaining nine models. Lukkade chose Philip, Moo chose Attila, and Peach chose Man. After know team Moo and team Peach won a campaign. Moo choose Third and Peach chose Joseph Angelo as a final contestant who allow to a final runway. Mos, Sam, Mickey and Gunn was eliminated.
- In episode 10, Joseph Angelo won the campaign individually, Philip, Attila and Man were put through to the final runway show while Third and Joseph Angelo was eliminated.

=== Campaigns ===
- Episode 1: Naked face group shots, Runway and Self Administered 'Transformations' (Casting)
- Episode 2: Sensitive Side of Men for L'Oréal Men Expert Hydra Sensitive
- Episode 3: Walk Your Pets
- Episode 4: Confident in Love for Head & Shoulders
- Episode 5: Locker Room for Cathy Doll by Karmarts
- Episode 6: Victory Walk for GQ Thailand
- Episode 7: Newly Wet Couple for Head & Shoulders Suprême
- Episode 8: Alpha Move by Alpha Men for L'Oréal Men Expert White Active Oil Control, L'Oréal Men Expert Hydra Energetic and L'Oréal Men Expert Vita Lift
- Episode 9: Body Pose for Namu Life SnailWhite Créme Body Wash Natural White, SnailWhite Créme Body Wash Deep Moisture and SnailWhite Créme Body Wash Anti-aging
- Episode 10: Acting and Finalwalk

== Official partners ==
- L'Oréal Men Expert
- Head & Shoulders
- Cathy Doll by Karmarts
- Toyota Corolla Altis
- GQ Thailand
- Bangkok Metro Networks Limited (BMN)
- DNA Skin Clinic

== Notes ==
1. [a] PK represented Thailand at 2018 Asia Model Festival Awards (Face of Asia) held in South Korea, where he won Best Relationship.
2. [b] Man represented Thailand at 2018 Asia Model Festival Awards (Face of Asia) held in South Korea, where he won the OnDay Cosmetics Award.
