= The Face Thailand season 7 =

The Face Thailand
- Season 7
- Promotional poster
- No. of episodes: 8

Release
- Original network: Channel 3 Netflix
- Original release: 10 October 2026

Season chronology
- ← Previous; Season 6

The Face Thailand season 7 is the seventh season of The Face Thailand. Will premiere on 10 October 2026, and presented by Ston Tantraporn.

Khemanit Jamikorn, previously won Season 6, returns as the Mentor for the second time, along with Anntonia Porsild and new Mentor Cindy Bishop. Educator Kritika Kongsompong participates as the season's Chairman.

== Contestants ==
(ages stated are at start of filming)

Contestant	Age	Model coach	Finish	Rank
MJ		Cindy	Episode 2	15-14
Kaikaew		Cindy	Episode 2	15-14
Milan		Cindy	Episode 3	13
Fern		Anntonia	Episode 4	12
Sonya		Pancake	Episode 5	11
Jean		Anntonia	Episode 6	10
Aom		Anntonia	Episode 7	9-5
Tawan		Cindy	Episode 7	9-5
Mimi		Pancake	Episode 7	9-5
Vanessa		Pancake	Episode 7	9-5
Prikkang		Pancake	Episode 7	9-5
Oven		Anntonia		
Gabi		Anntonia		
Nina		Cindy		
Mew		Pancake		

== Episodes ==
=== Episode 1: Audition Awakening ===
First airdate: October 10, 2026

- Team Anntonia : Oven, Fern, Jean, Aom, Gabi
- Team Pancake : Sonya, Mimi, Vanessa, Prikkang, Mew
- Team Cindy : MJ, Kaikaew, Nina, Milan, Tawan

=== Episode 2: RUNWAY THE DENIM RENAISSANCE (RUNWAY OF NO RETURN) ===
First airdate: October 17, 2026

- Winning coach and team: Anntonia
- Bottom four: MJ, Kaikaew, Vanessa, Prikkang
- Eliminated: MJ, Kaikaew

=== Episode 3: BEAUTERRY — My HOME Collection Pop up Shop ===
First airdate: October 24, 2026

- Winning coach and team: Anntonia
- Winner of the campaign: Jean
- Bottom two: Prikkang and Milan
- Eliminated: Milan

=== Episode 4: Group Fashion Photography: Lock It with TRESemmé ===
First airdate: October 31, 2026

- Winning coach and team: Cindy
- Bottom three: Jean, Fern and Mimi
- Eliminated: Fern
- Special guest: Bee Namthip

=== Episode 5 ===
First airdate: November 7, 2026

- Special guest: Sonia Couling

== Summaries ==
=== Elimination Table ===
Team Anntonia	Team Pancake	Team Cindy

Contestant	Episodes							
Contestant	1	2	3	4	5	6	7	8
Challenge Winner	—N/a	Sonya	Sonya	Oven	Nina	Nina	Gabi	—N/a
Gabi	IN	WIN	WIN	IN	IN	LOW	SAVED	
Oven	IN	WIN	WIN	IN	IN	IN	WIN	
Mew	IN	IN	IN	IN	IN	WIN	LOW	
Nina	IN	IN	IN	WIN	WIN	IN	LOW	
Aom	IN	WIN	WIN	IN	IN	LOW	OUT	
Mimi	IN	IN	IN	LOW	IN	WIN	OUT	
Prikkang	IN	LOW	LOW	IN	IN	WIN	OUT	
Vanessa	IN	LOW	IN	IN	IN	WIN	OUT	
Tawan	IN	IN	IN	WIN	WIN	SAVED	OUT	
Jean	IN	WIN	WIN	LOW	LOW	OUT		
Sonya	IN	IN	IN	IN	OUT			
Fern	IN	WIN	WIN	OUT				
Milan	IN	IN	OUT					
MJ	IN	OUT						
Kaikaew	IN	OUT						

The contestant won the campaign for the episode and was part of the winning team for the episode.
The contestant was part of the winning team for the episode.
This contestant scored the highest in the team during the weekly competition and was safe from elimination.
The contestant was at risk of elimination.
The contestant was originally eliminated but was saved by Secret Letter.
The contestant was eliminated from the competition.
The contestant was a Runner-Up.
The contestant won The Face.

=== Campaigns ===
- Episode 1:
- Episode 2:
- Episode 3:
- Episode 4:
- Episode 5:
- Episode 6:
- Episode 7:
- Episode 8:
