= Arayha Suparurk =

Thai-Austrian model

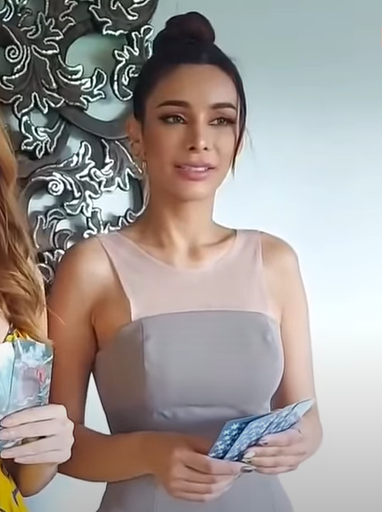
- Suparurk in 2020
- Born: Arayha Suparurk; May 15, 1994 (age 32); Pathum Thani, Thailand
- Education: Thai Ayothaya Business Administration College; Dhurakij Pundit University
- Height: 1.75 m (5 ft 9 in)

Arayha Suparurk (Thai: อารยะ ศุภฤกษ์, RTGS: Araya Supharoek; born 15 May 1994), more commonly known as Coco, is a Thai-Austrian model and beauty pageant titleholder, who was crowned Miss Grand Thailand 2019.

== Early life and education ==
Suparurk was born to an Austrian father and a Thai mother who later on separated. She received a bachelor’s degree in Communication Arts from Dhurakij Pundit University.

== Career ==
Suparurk was 1st runner-up at Miss Thailand World 2011.

Suparurk competed on the second season of The Face Thailand in 2015, as one of the 5 member of team Lukkade Metinee. She end up eliminated in the semi-final.

She was crowned Miss Grand Thailand in 2019, and was 2nd runner-up at Miss Grand International that same year.

During the question round of the Miss Grand International 2019, she was asked: "What is the best thing you can think of, from Venezuela to tell to the world, and why?" She responded:

The best thing for me in Venezuela is you. Everyone, if no you here no Venezuela. Te amo Venezuela, muchas gracias.

== Controversy ==
During the 2019 Miss Grand Thailand pageant, Suparurk was condemned for posting body-shaming comments against Filipino model and Miss Universe 2018 Catriona Gray on social media. Suparurk would subsequently file cyberbullying charges against three internet users following her trending comments.

== Filmography ==
=== Television dramas ===
- 2018 Kaew Kumpun (แก้วกุมภัณฑ์) (Dee One TV/Ch.3) as Kun Nai (คุณนาย)
- 2018 Prakasit Kammathep (ประกาศิตกามเทพ) (Dee One TV/Ch.3) as Sindy (Cameo) (ซินดี้ (เลขาของเสี่ยสาม) (รับเชิญ))
- 2020 Pom Arthun 2020 (ผมอาถรรพ์) Dee One TV(/Ch.3) as Go Go (Model) (Cameo) (โกโก้ (นางแบบ) (รับเชิญ))
- 2020 Lady Bancham (เลดี้บานฉ่ำ) (The One Enterprise/One 31) as Meda (Cameo) (มีนลดา เพชรรัตน์นาราศร (เมดา) (รับเชิญ))
- 2021 Talay Duerd (ทะเลเดือด) (/Ch.7) as Ann (Cameo) (แอน (รับเชิญ))
- 2022 Sisa Marn (2022) (ศีรษะมาร) (Bear In Mind Studios/Ch.8) as Éclair (Cameo) (เอแคลร์ (รับเชิญ))

=== Movie ===
- 2019 1325 เลขเป็น เลขตาย
- 2020 นาคีทวิภพ

== MC ==
Online

- 2021 : เอิ๊กอ๊ากไปกับมิส EP.1 ตะลุยสำเพ็ง On Air YouTube:Coco Arayha CHANNEL

Awards and achievements
Preceded by Cassandra Sarikanon	Miss Thailand World (1st Runner-Up); 2011	Succeeded by Boonyisa Chandrarachai
Preceded by N/A	Supermodel International 2011 (1st Runner-Up); 2011	Succeeded by N/A
Preceded by Nam–Oey Chanaphan	Miss Grand Thailand; 2019	Succeeded by Patcharaporn Chantarapadit
Preceded by (Indonesia) Nadia Purwoko	Miss Grand International (2nd Runner-Up); 2019	Succeeded by (Guatemala) Ivana Batchelor
