= Miss Universe Thailand 2017 =

18th Miss Universe Thailand pageant

- Official pageant logo
- Date: 15 July 2017
- Presenters: Hemmawat Nittayaros; Elizabeth Sadler Leenanuchai
- Venue: Royal Paragon Hall, Siam Paragon, Bangkok, Thailand
- Broadcaster: Channel 3
- Entrants: 40
- Placements: 16
- Winner: Maria Ehren; Bangkok
- Photogenic: Kanyaphatsaporn Rungruang, Surat Thani

Miss Universe Thailand 2017 was the 18th edition of the Miss Universe Thailand pageant held at Royal Paragon Hall, Siam Paragon in Bangkok on 29 July 2017. The previous winner, Chalita Suansane from Samut Prakan crowned Maria Ehren at the end of the event.

The coronation pageant was broadcast live on Channel 3 Thailand. Ehren later represented Thailand at Miss Universe 2017 in Las Vegas, United States and finished in the top five. One of the second runners-up, Paweensuda Drouin represented Thailand at Miss Earth 2017 and reached the top eight. Drouin was the last Thai representative at Miss Earth chosen by Miss Universe Thailand, and became the first second runner-up of the pageant to compete in Miss Earth instead of first runner-up as in previous years.

== Results ==
=== Placements ===
Placement	Contestant
Miss Universe Thailand 2017	Bangkok – Maria Ehren
1st Runner-Up	Chiang Mai – Supaporn Ritthipreuk
2nd Runner-Up	Bangkok – Paweensuda Drouin
Top 5	Bangkok – Suraprin Artkongharn; Kalasin – Ratchanok Naowaset
Top 10	Bangkok – Pichapohn Petchkaew; Bangkok – Rozalynn Syamananda; Chumphon – Jareerat Petsom; Samut Prakan – Krongthong Chantarasompoch; Surat Thani – Kanyaphatsaporn Rungrueang
Top 16	Bangkok – Tanapond Soranant; Chonburi – Chiratchaya Leelaprapaporn; Kalasin – Pimsuda Panpoka; Khon Kaen – Chatchada Auntasri; Phuket – Ananya Nilson; Yala – Ratapiraya Apinunthanapat §

§ – Ratapiraya directly entered into Top 16 after winning Miss People's Choice.

== Special awards ==
Award	Contestant
Miss Photogenic	Surat Thani – Kanyaphatsaporn Rungruang
Miss People's Choice	Yala – Ratapiraya Apinunthanapat
Miss Smile	Bangkok – Paweensuda Drouin
Boutique Lady	Bangkok – Maria Ehren
Miss Beauty & Elegance	Phatthalung – Kwannakorn Chaiwan
Kulla Satree Sri Chiang Mai	Chiang Mai – Dala Naksuk

== Delegates ==
40 delegates were confirmed, per information from the Miss Universe Thailand official website:

Number	Name	Age	Height (ft)	Placement	Province	Special Award
1	Apassanun Khunsing	23	1.72 m (5 ft 8 in)		Lopburi	
2	Sunisa Ketkaew	23	1.71 m (5 ft 7 in)		Ranong	
3	Paweensuda Drouin	23	1.82 m (6 ft 0 in)	Top 5 (Miss Earth Thailand 2017)	Bangkok	Miss Smile
4	Wanchareeporn Boontan	21	1.76 m (5 ft 9 in)		Yasothon	
5	Maria Ehren	25	1.83 m (6 ft 0 in)	Miss Universe Thailand 2017	Bangkok	Boutique Lady
6	Chanaran Tanthanachai	20	1.70 m (5 ft 7 in)		Kanchanaburi	
7	Krongthong Chantarasompoch	20	1.76 m (5 ft 9 in)	Top 10	Samut Prakan	
8	Pimsuda Panpoka	20	1.72 m (5 ft 8 in)	Top 16	Kalasin	
9	Jareerat Petsom	24	1.67 m (5 ft 6 in)	Top 10	Chumphon	
10	Prowravee Kittivoraprasat	20	1.72 m (5 ft 8 in)		Songkhla	
11	Sasiwimon Saibuaban	26	1.76 m (5 ft 9 in)		Yasothon	
12	Jiratchaya Sookinta	19	1.73 m (5 ft 8 in)		Phayao	
13	Sasamol Chareonsook	23	1.75 m (5 ft 9 in)		Prachin Buri	
14	Kotchapan Paitoon	24	1.70 m (5 ft 7 in)		Udon Thani	
15	Rozalynn Syamananda	21	1.67 m (5 ft 6 in)	Top 10	Bangkok	
16	Prapatsorn Thaisatien	21	1.75 m (5 ft 9 in)		Nong Khai	
17	Ratchana Pranimit	24	1.70 m (5 ft 7 in)		Prachuap Khiri Khan	
18	Supichaya Youngyuen	22	1.74 m (5 ft 9 in)		Samut Prakan	
19	Aunchisa Krittayasophon	23	1.75 m (5 ft 9 in)		Prachin Buri	
20	Chatchada Auntasri	21	1.70 m (5 ft 7 in)	Top 16	Khon Kaen	
21	Suraprin Artkongharn	21	1.76 m (5 ft 9 in)	Top 5	Bangkok	
22	Tanapond Soranant	26	1.70 m (5 ft 7 in)	Top 16	Bangkok	
23	Ananya Nilson	23	1.68 m (5 ft 6 in)	Top 16	Phuket	
24	Ratapiraya Apinunthanapat	24	1.72 m (5 ft 8 in)	Top 16	Yala	Miss People's Choice
25	Uchuta Praditpholsaen	20	1.71 m (5 ft 7 in)		Chonburi	
26	Marnfah Palasri	22	1.72 m (5 ft 8 in)		Samut Prakan	
27	Salilthip Leelawijitkul	23	1.75 m (5 ft 9 in)		Trang	
28	Chiratchaya Leelaprapaporn	22	1.73 m (5 ft 8 in)	Top 16	Chonburi	
29	Pichapohn Petchkaew	23	1.76 m (5 ft 9 in)	Top 10	Bangkok	
30	Wannisa Yoskham	19	1.76 m (5 ft 9 in)		Bangkok	
31	Juthamanee Parasing	21	1.70 m (5 ft 7 in)		Samut Sakhon	
32	Sirirat Kalaboot	18	1.77 m (5 ft 10 in)		Udon Thani	
33	Pisuttha Nunthavorawech	24	1.68 m (5 ft 6 in)		Nakhon Ratchasima	
34	Ratchanok Naowaset	22	1.73 m (5 ft 8 in)	Top 5	Kalasin	
35	Raiwint Kittivongsiri	24	1.72 m (5 ft 8 in)		Bangkok	
36	Kwannakorn Chaiwan	26	1.71 m (5 ft 7 in)		Phatthalung	Miss Beauty & Elegance
37	Kanyaphatsaporn Rungruang	20	1.72 m (5 ft 8 in)	Top 10	Surat Thani	Miss Photogenic
38	Supaporn Ritthipreuk	20	1.78 m (5 ft 10 in)	1st Runner-Up	Chiang Mai	
39	Papassorn Prasitkasikorn	26	1.72 m (5 ft 8 in)		Bangkok	
40	Dahla Naksuk	21	1.67 m (5 ft 6 in)		Chiang Mai	Kulla Satree Sri Chiang Mai
