= Kanticha Chumma =

Thai actress

- กันติชา ชุมมะ
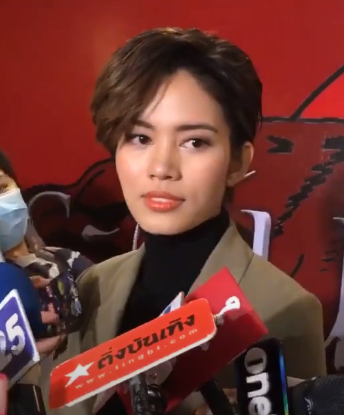
- Other name: Ticha
- Occupations: Actress; model
- Years active: 2016–present
- Agent: Kantana Group (2015–present)
- Known for: The Face Thailand S2 winner

Kanticha Chumma, (Thai: กันติชา ชุมมะ; RTGS: Kanticha Chumma, born 19 February 1995), nicknamed Ticha, is a Thai actress and model. She was born in Nakhon Si Thammarat Province but grew up in Sweden until she moved back to Phuket when she was 13, where she attended Satree Phuket School.

She became famous in the entertainment industry by winning a modeling competition named The Face Thailand in 2016.

== The Face Thailand ==
After hearing about the recruitment of The Face Thailand, she returned to Thailand 3 days before the application date to enter the contest. She joined Namthip Jongrachatawiboon's team and won the season 2 in 2016. In an interview, she revealed that she does not fit the stereotype that would fit in Thailand's beauty industry, but she has grown resilient against negative criticism from an early age.

== Filmography ==
Following her debut in The Face Thailand, she starred in the TV series Soot Ruk Chun La Moon from 2016 to 2017 and in Strange Girl in a Strange Land in 2019.

=== Short films ===
Year	Thai title	Title	Role	Network	Notes	With
2021	-	Songkran	Mai	Omeleto	YouTube	

=== TV Dramas ===
Year	Thai title	Title	Role	Network	Notes	With
2018	นางสาวไม่จำกัดนามสกุล		Nokweed	One 31		
2019	สาวแปลกในเมืองป่วน		Nong	Line TV		
2019	ฝ่าดงพยัคฆ์		Lai Duaw	PPTVHD36		
2020	ฝ้ายแกมแพร		Sopid	One 31		
2021	ดวงใจในมนตรา		Karissa Saton	3HD33		
2021	พระจันทร์แดง		Dr.Akchara	One 31		

=== TV Series ===
Year	Thai title	Title	Role	Network	Notes	With
2016	MelodiesOfLife ตอน My Name Is Single (คนไม่มีแฟน)		Timor	GMM 25		
2017	Journey The Series แก๊งเฟี้ยวเที่ยวทั่วไทย		Ticha	3HD33		
2019	เสน่หาสตอรี่ ตอน ชมพู่		Sai	App AIS		
2020	LOVE STALKER รัก ซ่อน แอบ		Jen	GMM 25		

=== TV Sitcom ===
Year	Thai title	Title	Role	Network	Notes	With
2016-2017	สูตรรักชุลมุน		Lalissa Prapaporn (Soda)	One 31		
2017	เป็นต่อ 2019 ตอน ขาว ตี๋ สปอร์ต กทม.		Dee-Nee	One 31		

=== Master of Ceremony: MC ON TV ===
Year	Thai title	Title	Network	Notes	With
2017	Make up my way				
2017	Life.beats By Gmm Bravo		GMM 25		
2018	แดนซ์ แดนซ์ แดนซ์ ไทยแลนด์	Dance Dance Dance Thailand	Line TV; One 31		Kathsepsawad Palakawong Na Ayyuttaya
2018	เทยเที่ยวไทย	Toey Tiew Thai: The Route	GMM 25	รับเชิญ	
2020	กิน-แก้-กรรม Kcal Killer SS.1		YouTube : PEEPZCO		
2020	กิน-แก้-กรรม Kcal Killer SS.2		YouTube : PEEPZCO		
2021	กิน-แก้-กรรม Kcal Killer SS.3		YouTube : PEEPZCO		
