= The Face Thailand season 4 =

The Face Thailand
- Season 4
- Promotional poster
- No. of episodes: 13

Release
- Original network: Channel 3 LINE TV
- Original release: 10 February – 12 May 2018

Season chronology
- ← Previous; Season 3 Next → Season 5

The Face Thailand Season 4 (also known as The Face Thailand All Stars) On 30 September 2017 at The Face Men Thailand season 1's final walk the executive producer announced on stage that he will premiere The Face Thailand All Stars. Feature returning non-winning contestants from 3 previous seasons of The Face Thailand and The Face Men Thailand (season 1) for a second chance to win the title. The season premiered on 10 February 2018.

== Mentors ==
- Lukkade Metinee
- Bee Namthip
- Cris Horwang
- Ploy Chermarn (ep. 1–12)
- Sonia Couling
- Sririta Jensen

== Contestants ==
(ages stated are at start of filming)

Contestant	Age	Height	Hometown	Previous Season	Previous Model Coach	Previous Place	Model Coach	Finish	Place
Jutiporn "Maprang" Arunchot	23	1.80 m (5 ft 11 in)	Chiang Mai	Season 2	Lukkade	4	Bee and Rita	Episode 2	18
Salita "Jukkoo" Klinchan	24	1.73 m (5 ft 8 in)	Samut Sakhon	Season 2	Bee	7–5	Ploy and Sonia	Episode 3	17
Kirana "Jazzy" Jasmine Chewter	19	1.76 m (5 ft 9 1/2 in)	Bangkok	Season 2	Cris	8	Bee and Rita	Episode 5	16
Nathachat "Hana" Chancheaw	26	1.80 m (5 ft 11 in)	Surin	Season 3	Lukkade and Cris	9	Ploy and Sonia	Episode 6	15
Aornicha "Jenny" Akrasaevaya^{[a]}	24	1.70 m (5 ft 7 in)	Khon Kaen	Season 1	Ploy	13	Bee and Rita	Episode 7	14
Kansiri "Hong" Sirimat	23	1.73 m (5 ft 8 in)	Bangkok	Season 1	Ying	9	Lukkade and Cris	Episode 8	13
Tanaphop "Third" Yoovichit	20	1.85 m (6 ft 1 in)	Bangkok	Season 1 Men	Moo	5–4	Lukkade and Cris	Episode 12	12
Peemsinee "Fah" Sawangkla^{[c]}	24	1.78 m (5 ft 10 in)	Nonthaburi	Season 3	Lukkade	4–2	Ploy and Sonia	Episode 12	11
Niki Boontham	22	1.90 m (6 ft 3 in)	Chonburi	Season 1 Men	Lukkade	14–12	Lukkade and Cris	Episode 12	10–8
Raknapak "Namwan" Wongtanatat	28	1.74 m (5 ft 8 1/2 in)	Bangkok	Season 2	Cris	14	Lukkade and Cris	Episode 12	10–8
Jittima "Sai" Visuttipranee	27	1.71 m (5 ft 7 1/2 in)	Chiang Mai	Season 1	Ying	4	Ploy and Sonia	Episode 12	10–8
Joseph Angelo	24	1.80 m (5 ft 11 in)	Khon Kaen	Season 1 Men	Peach	5–4	Bee and Rita	Episode 13	7-2
Tia Li Taveepanichpan	21	1.72 m (5 ft 7 1/2 in)	Phuket	Season 3	Bee	7–5	Bee and Rita	Episode 13	7-2
Maria "Sky" Hoerschler	23	1.73 m (5 ft 8 in)	Ubon Ratchathani	Season 3	Bee	4–2	Bee and Rita	Episode 13	7-2
Zeththinich "Darran" Chanavarasutthisiri^{[b]}	23	1.77 m (5 ft 9 1/2 in)	Chonburi	Season 3	Marsha and Cris	8	Lukkade and Cris	Episode 13	7-2
Korawan "Prim" Lodsantia	22	1.77 m (5 ft 9 1/2 in)	Nakhon Ratchasima	Season 3	Marsha	12	Ploy and Sonia	Episode 13	7-2
Arthur "Attila" Apichaht Gagnaux	25	1.88 m (6 ft 2 in)	Geneva, Switzerland	Season 1 Men	Moo	3–2	Ploy and Sonia	Episode 13	7-2
Virahya "Gina" Pattarachokchai	25	1.75 m (5 ft 9 in)	Ratchaburi	Season 2	Lukkade	3–2	Lukkade and Cris	Episode 13	1

== Episodes ==
The Face All-Stars logo

=== Episode 1 : Casting ===
First air 10 February 2018

- Team Lukkade and Cris : Gina, Niki, Hong, Namwan, Third, Darran.
- Team Bee and Rita : Jenny, Tia, Joseph Angelo, Jazzy, Sky, Maprang.
- Team Ploy and Sonia : Attila, Prim, Sai, Fah, Jukkoo, Hana.
- Special guest: Piyarat Kaljaruek

=== Episode 2 : The Godness of Nature and Fire ===
First airdate: 17 February 2018

- Winning coach and team: Sonia Couling
- Bottom two: Niki Boontham & Maprang Arunchot
- Eliminated: Maprang Arunchot
- Special guest: Sombatsara Thirasaroj & Cindy Bishop

=== Episode 3 : Outstanding ===
First airdate: 24 February 2018

- Winning coach and team: Sririta Jensen
- Bottom two: Third Yoovichit & Jukkoo Klinchan
- Eliminated: Jukkoo Klinchan
- Special guest: Araya Indra, Pangina Heals, Pattriya Na Nakorn, Nutthanaphol Thinroj & Drag Race Thailand
- Featured photographer: Punsiri Siriwetchapun

=== Episode 4 : The Couture Musketeers ===
First airdate: 3 March 2018

- Winning coach and team: Cris Horwang
- Bottom two: Jenny Akrasaevaya & Hana Chancheaw
- Eliminated: None
- Special guest: Kulp Kaljareuk, Rattanarat Eertaweekul, Sansern Ngernrungruangroj & Rhatha Phongam

=== Episode 5 : Brightness ===
First airdate: 17 March 2018

- Winning coach and team: Sonia Couling
- Bottom two: Hong Sirimat & Jazzy Chewter
- Eliminated: Jazzy Chewter
- Special guest: Techin Ploypetch, Natapohn Tameeruks, Nattavut Trivisvavet & Sakuntala Thianphairot
- Featured photographer: Nat Prakobsantisuk

=== Episode 6 : Under Water World ===
First airdate: 24 March 2018

- Winning coach and team: Sririta Jensen
- Bottom two: Niki Boontham & Hana Chancheaw
- Eliminated: Hana Chancheaw
- Special mentor: Ajirapha Meisinger & Natthaya Boonchompaisarn
- Special guest: Wilasinee Panurat & Kanticha Chumma

=== Episode 7 : Always Get More Is ME ===
First airdate: 31 March 2018

- Winning coach and team: Cris Horwang
- Bottom two: Jenny Akrasaevaya & Sai Visuttipranee
- Eliminated: Jenny Akrasaevaya
- Special guest: Cindy Bishop

=== Episode 8 : Looking Grace Swing ===
First airdate: 7 April 2018

- Winning coach and team: Bee Namthip
- Bottom two: Hong Sirimaat & Sai Visuttipranee
- Eliminated: Hong Sirimaat
- Special guest: Polpat Asavaprapha & Aniporn Chalermburanawong

=== Episode 9 : SHU Everyday Lifestyle Fashion ===
First airdate: 14 April 2018

- Winning coach and team: Ploy Chermarn
- Bottom two: Third Yuvijit & Joseph Angelo
- Eliminated: Third Yuvijit & Joseph Angelo (Both Eliminated)
- Special guest: Marsha Vadhanapanich

=== Episode 10 : Everyday is Runway ===
First airdate: 21 April 2018

- Winning coach and team: Sririta Jensen
- Bottom two: Fah Sawangkla & Namwan Wongtanatat
- Eliminated: None
- Special guest: Polpat Asavaprapha

=== Episode 11 : CHR Irresistible ===
First airdate: 28 April 2018

- Winning coach and team: Sririta Jensen
- Bottom two: Fah Sawangkla & Niki Boontham
- Eliminated: Fah Sawangkla
- Special guest: Ratchawin Wongviriya

=== Episode 12 : Atomic Blonde ===
First airdate: 6 May 2018

- Winning coach and team: Bee Namthip and Sririta Jensen
- Winning campaign: Tia Taveepanichpan
- Returned: Fah Sawangkla, Third Yuvijit and Joseph Angelo
- Final sixth was chosen by Coach: Gina Pattarachokchai, Darran Chanavarasutthisiri, Prim Lodsantia, Attila Gagnaux, Tia Taveepanichpan and Sky Hoerschler
- Seventh final was chosen by coach from winning campaign team: Joseph Angelo
- Eliminated: Sai Visuttipranee, Namwan Wongtanatat, Niki Boontham, Fah Sawangkla and Third Yuvijit
- Special guest: Urassaya Sperbund

=== Episode 13 : Final Walk ===
First airdate: 12 May 2018

- Final 7: Gina Pattarachokchai, Darran Chanavarasutthisiri, Prim Lodsantia, Attila Gagnaux, Tia Taveepanichpan and Sky Hoerschler, Joseph Angelo
- Winning campaign: Gina Pattarachokchai
- Winning special award: Joseph Angelo
- The Face Thailand: Gina Pattarachokchai
- Winning coach and team: Lukkade Metinee & Cris Horwang
- Special guest: Janice Dickinson

== Summaries ==
=== Elimination Table ===
Team Cris & Lukkade	Team Bee & Rita	Team Ploy & Sonia

Contestant	Episodes														
Contestant	1	2	3	4	5	6	7	8	9	10	11	12		13	
Challenge Winner	—N/a	—N/a	Joseph	Niki	Tia, Niki	Tia	Sky, Niki	Sky	Joseph	Attila	Sky	Gina		—N/a	
Gina	IN	IN	IN	WIN	IN	IN	WIN	IN	IN	IN	IN	IN	LOW	WIN	WINNER
Attila	IN	WIN	IN	IN	WIN	IN	IN	IN	WIN	IN	IN	IN	LOW	IN	RUNNER-UP
Prim	IN	WIN	IN	IN	WIN	IN	IN	IN	WIN	IN	IN	IN	LOW	IN	RUNNER-UP
Darran	IN	IN	IN	WIN	IN	IN	WIN	IN	IN	IN	IN	IN	LOW	IN	RUNNER-UP
Sky	IN	IN	WIN	IN	IN	WIN	IN	WIN	IN	WIN	WIN	IN	LOW	IN	RUNNER-UP
Tia	IN	IN	WIN	IN	IN	WIN	IN	WIN	IN	WIN	WIN	IN	WIN	IN	RUNNER-UP
Joseph	IN	IN	WIN	IN	IN	WIN	IN	WIN	OUT			JOIN	RET	IN	RUNNER-UP
Niki	IN	LOW	IN	WIN	IN	LOW	WIN	IN	IN	IN	LOW	IN	OUT		
Namwan	IN	IN	IN	WIN	IN	IN	WIN	IN	IN	LOW	IN	IN	OUT		
Sai	IN	WIN	IN	IN	WIN	IN	LOW	LOW	WIN	IN	IN	IN	OUT		
Fah	IN	WIN	IN	IN	WIN	IN	IN	IN	WIN	LOW	OUT	JOIN	OUT		
Third	IN	IN	LOW	WIN	IN	IN	WIN	IN	OUT			JOIN	OUT		
Hong	IN	IN	IN	WIN	LOW	IN	WIN	OUT							
Jenny	IN	IN	WIN	LOW	IN	WIN	OUT								
Hana	IN	WIN	IN	LOW	WIN	OUT									
Jazzy	IN	IN	WIN	IN	OUT										
Jukkoo	IN	WIN	OUT												
Maprang	IN	OUT													

The contestant was part of the winning team for the episode.
The contestant was part of the winning special award from the campaign for the episode.
The contestant was at risk of elimination.
The contestant was eliminated from the competition.
The contestant was immune from elimination.
The contestant was immune from elimination but was eliminated.
The contestant was originally eliminated but returned to the competition.
The contestant was originally eliminated but returned to the competition and was eliminated.
The contestant was a Runner-Up.
The contestant won The Face Thailand.

- Episode 1 was the casting episode. The final eighteen were divided into individual teams of six as they were selected.
- From episodes 2–11, challenge winner each episode was also immune from nomination/elimination if they happened to be on one of the losing teams.
- In episode 4, team Cris & Lukkade won the campaign. Sonia nominated Hana while Bee nominated Jenny for the elimination. Cris did not eliminate either of them.
- In episode 9, Joseph won challenge winner but he disclaim his immune and went to elimination room together with Third. Ploy eliminated both of them.
- In episode 10, team Bee & Rita won the campaign. Cris nominated Namwan while Ploy nominated Fah for elimination. Rita did not eliminate either of them.

=== Campaigns ===
- Episode 1: Runway and Self Administered 'Transformations' (Casting)
- Episode 2: The Godness of Nature and Fire
- Episode 3: Outstanding
- Episode 4: The Couture Musketeers
- Episode 5: Brightness
- Episode 6: Under Water World
- Episode 7: Always Get More Is ME
- Episode 8: Looking Grace Swing
- Episode 9: SHU Everyday Lifestyle Fashion
- Episode 10: Everyday is Runway
- Episode 11: CHR Irresistible
- Episode 12: Atomic Blonde
- Episode 13: Acting TVC Sea Min Drink and Final walk

== Notes ==
1. [c] Previously known in Season 1 is Aornicha "Jenny" Kaykham.
2. [b] Previously known in Season 3 is Wilawan "Julie" Anderson.
3. [c] Fah represented Thailand at the 2018 Asia Model Festival Awards (Face of Asia) held in South Korea, where she won the Seoul Representative Model and Lui & Lei Cosmetics Awards.
