= Janie Tienphosuwan =

Thai actress and model (born 1981)

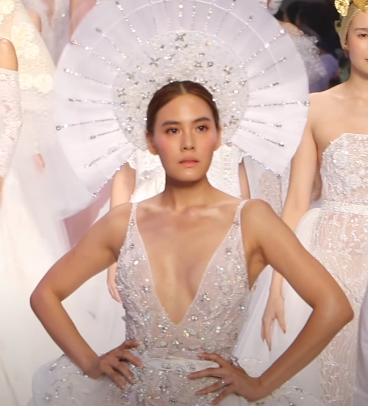
- Janie at the Elle Fashion Week 2018
- Born: Janie Tienphosuwan; 11 September 1981 (age 44); Los Angeles, California, U.S.
- Other name: Jeab
- Occupations: Actress; model
- Spouses: Chonsawat Asavahame (m. 2013; div. 2014) Nol Allapach Na Pombhejara (m. 2018; div. 2024)
- Children: 1

Janie Tienphosuwan (Thai: เจนี่ เทียนโพธิ์สุวรรณ์, RTGS: Cheni Thianphosuwan; born 11 September 1981) is an American-born Thai actress and model.

== Early life and education ==
Janie graduated with a bachelor in Communication Arts degree from Bangkok University. After her parents' divorce, she moved back to Thailand with her sibling and mother.

== Career ==
Janie started her acting career in a music video. After that she quickly rose to fame in a Thai television soap opera with Andrew Gregson.

== Filmography ==
=== Television ===
- Yot Chiwan (ยอดชีวัน)
- Thang Phan Kammathep (ทางผ่านกามเทพ)
- Nang Chon (นางโจร)
- Phrachan San Kon (พระจันทร์แสนกล)
- Sompong Nong Somchai (สมปองน้องสมชาย)
- Phu Saen Dao (ภูแสนดาว)
- Lady Yaowarat (เลดี้เยาวราช)
- Hoi An Chan Rak Thur'' (ฮอยอัน...ฉันรักเธอ)
- Nueng Nai Suang (หนึ่งในทรวง)
- Ruk Khong Nai Dokmai (รักของนายดอกไม้)
- Tang Fa Tawan Diao (ต่างฟ้าตะวันเดียว)
- Thep Thida Khon Nok (เทพธิดาขนนก)
- Khun Chai Rai Lem Kwian (คุณชายร้ายเล่มเกวียน)
- This Love Belongs to our Hearts (รักนี้หัวใจเราจอง)
- Krungthep Ratri (กรุงเทพฯ ราตรี)
- Saphai Luk Thung (สะใภ้ลูกทุ่ง) (Country Daughter-In-Law)
- Yok Lai Mek
- Nam Phueng Khom (น้ำผึ้งขม)
- Suay Roet Choet Sot
- Tart Rak with Smart
- Kol Ruk Luang Jai
- Lueaed Mung Korn-Hong(Upcoming 2015)
- Raeng Ngao (2012)
- You Are My Make Up Artist (2022)

== Hosting ==
Online

- 2021 Nola's Family EP 1: Q&A และ พาไป Hua Hin Safari On Air YouTube:Nola's Family
