= Polpat Asavaprapha =

Thai designer and businessman

- Born: Bangkok, Thailand
- Other names: Moo
- Education: Bachelor degree of Communication Arts from Chulalongkorn University and Master degree from Peter F. Drucker and Masatoshi Ito Graduate School of Management, Claremont Graduate University
- Occupations: Designer; Creative director
- Known for: The Face Men Thailand (season 1); The Face Men Thailand (season 2)

Polpat Asavaprapha (Thai: พลพัฒน์ อัศวะประภา, RTGS: Phonphat Asawaprapha), nicknamed Moo (Thai: หมู), is a Thai designer, creative director of Asava fashion house, founder of Asava Group and serves as President of the Bangkok Fashion Society. Polpat is also a familiar face on television, well known as a mentor of The Face Men Thailand (season 1) and season 2.

== Biography ==
=== Early life ===
Polpat is luk khrueng, with a Japanese mother and a Thai father. He grew up in a business-oriented family which owns car dealerships like Toyota dealer PS Enterprise.

He graduated from Chulalongkorn University, Mass Communication faculty, majored in Speech Communications and Performing Arts and earned a master's degree from Peter F. Drucker and Masatoshi Ito Graduate School of Management, Claremont Graduate University, a Fashion Design degree from Parsons School of Design in New York and trained with a selection of well-known brands including Giorgio Armani, Maxmara and Marc Jacobs.

=== Career ===
Having studied and worked in New York for almost 10 years, Polpat came back with a dream to pursue a fashion career as a dedicated designer. Since then, he has successfully established his own namesake couture brand, Asava that is locally as well as internationally recognized.

He is now the Creative Director and founder of Asava Group, which consists of luxury bespoke clothing, Asava, ASV and White Asava, and a restaurant, Sava Dining.

He has also made a name for himself by designing the costumes for Miss Universe Thailand; Aniporn Chalermburanawong, Chalita Suansane, Maria Lynn Ehren and Sophida Kanchanarin.

He also runs his own restaurant, Sava Dining, at EmQuartier and is an executive at the family-owned Toyota dealer PS Enterprise.

== Personal life ==
Polpat is an openly homosexual man.

== Television ==
- The Designer season 2 as judge
- The Face Thailand season 3 as guest judge
- The Face Men Thailand season 1 as mentor
- The Face Thailand season 4 All Stars as guest judge
- The Face Men Thailand season 2 as mentor
