= Maria Poonlertlarp =

Thai model and actress

- Born: Maria Lynn Ehren; Bangkok, Thailand
- Occupations: Model; actress
- Height: 1.83 m (6 ft 0 in)
- Beauty pageant titleholder
- Title: Miss Universe Thailand 2017
- Years active: 2006–present
- Hair color: Brown
- Eye color: Hazel
- Major competitions: Miss Universe Thailand 2017 (Winner); Miss Universe 2017 (Top 5)

Maria Lynn Ehren (Thai: มาเรีย ลินน์ เอียเรียน), known professionally as Maria Poonlertlarp (Thai: มารีญา พูลเลิศลาภ, RTGS: Mariya Phunloetlap, pronounced [māː.rīː.jāː pʰūːn.lɤ̂ːt.lâːp]) is a Thai actress, model and beauty pageant titleholder who won Miss Universe Thailand 2017. She represented Thailand at Miss Universe 2017, where she reached the top five.

== Career ==
In August 2016, Poonlertlarp began her career in modeling by posing on cover of Vogue Thailand.

In 2018, she became the guest star in the fourth episode of Asia's Next Top Model (season 6).

In February 2019, she became a mentor of The Face Thailand (season 5) with Toni Rakkaen, Virahya Pattarachokchai and Bank Anusith.

== Pageantry ==
=== Miss Universe Thailand 2017 ===
Poonlertlarp won Miss Universe Thailand 2017 on 29 July 2017. During its preliminary segment, Poonlertlarp won the Boutique Lady title sponsored by Bangkok Airways with a prize of 100,000 baht cash, and a complimentary round-trip first class airline ticket for the upcoming Miss Universe 2017 pageant destination.

During the competition, Poonlertlarp was asked what was difficult about being a woman. she answered:

Equality of men and women in Thailand isn’t equal yet, but to move forward, both men and women have to hold hands and move forward together, because it’s not just an issue about women. This stage will help me to succeed and build foundations to help Thailand.

During the pageant, she said she wanted to work on issues with sexual equality, teenage pregnancy, proper trash disposal and care for the homeless.

==== Miss Universe 2017 ====
On 26 November 2017, Poonlertlarp represented Thailand at Miss Universe 2017 in Las Vegas, US, where she reached the top five.

At the competition, Poonlertlarp wore a Thai national costume which was inspired by the Thai national epic Ramakien. It was designed by Prapakas Angsusingha. Ehren had to study and practice khon which includes traditional Thai dance and puppetry art of Hun krabok.

== Personal life ==
Poonlertlarp is a Buddhist. She is a voluntary English teacher at Duang Prateep, a non-profit foundation sponsored by the Thai royal family for children in Thailand.

In 2020, she expressed her support for the protesters of 2020 Thai protests.

== Filmography ==
=== Series ===
Year	Title	Role	Network
2019	Wolf	Ben / Beer	One 31
2021	Eng and Chang	Adelaide Yates	Disney+ Hotstar
2021	F4 Thailand: Boys Over Flowers	"Tia" / Aiyawarin Paramaanantra	GMM25
2024	High School Frenemy	Jan	GMM25

Awards and achievements
Preceded by Chalita Suansane	Miss Universe Thailand; 2017	Succeeded by Sophida Kanchanarin
Preceded by Chalita Suansane	Thailand representatives at Miss Universe; 2017	Succeeded by Sophida Kanchanarin
