= Utt Panichkul =

Thai–American actor, television presenter and model (born 1973)

- อัษฎา พานิชกุล
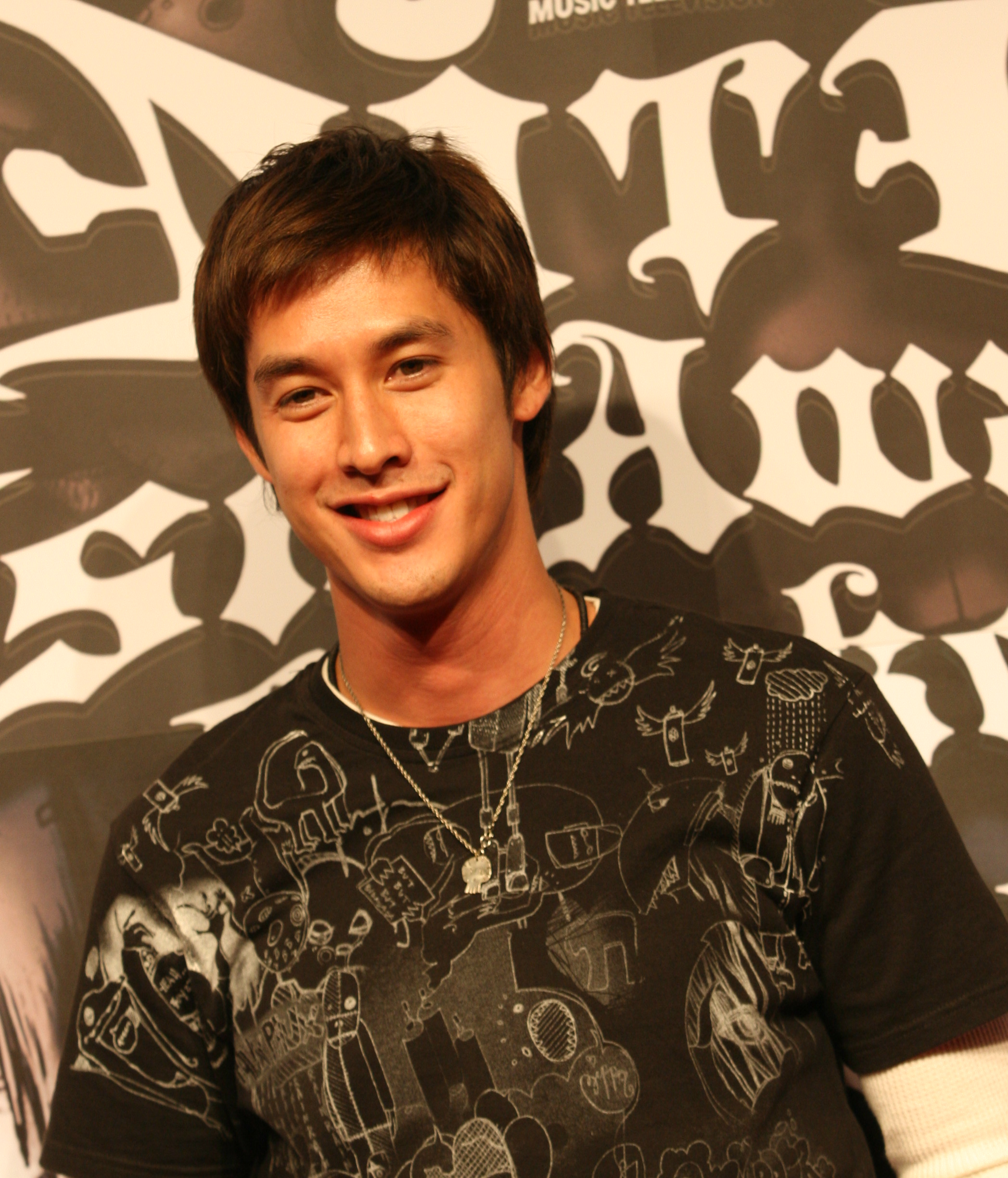
- Panichkul at MTV Asia Awards press conference in 2006
- Born: Greg Uttsada Panichkul; 3 September 1973 (age 53); California, United States
- Other name: Vj Utt
- Occupations: Actor; model; VJ; television presenter
- Years active: 1998–present

Greg Uttsada Panichkul (Thai: อัษฎา พานิชกุล; RTGS: Atsada Phanitchakun; born September 3, 1973) is a Thai–American actor, television presenter and model. He was a VJ for MTV Asia for over 15 years, making him one of Asia's longest running hosts and cementing his star status. Most recently Panichkul was the Director of Entertainment at IN Channel in Thailand and also a directorship at Beam Artistes in Singapore

== Early life ==
Panichkul was born and raised in California in a Thai Chinese household. His father was a professor in social science. Panichkul studied at California State University, Northridge majoring in Biology and transferred to Assumption University majoring in Communication Arts. While at Assumption, he did some modeling on the side, although, initially to earn enough for a plane ticket back to California.

== Career ==
Fluent in both English and Thai, Panichkul acted in several Thai television series while in Thailand, one of his notable roles very early on was in Song Klam Doag Rak (1997), where he acted as an HIV-positive sex worker. Panichkul received a nomination for Best Actor at the Thailand Television Awards.

Panichkul was previously the spokesperson for Giordano, Pepsi and Brand's Essence of Chicken. He is the Director of Beam Artistes Singapore and also the owner and director of his own Singapore-based Artiste Management company, Seven95ive Artistes.

Together with former model Thúy Hạnh, Panichkul is a permanent judge of MTV VJ Hunt for MTV Vietnam. He is also one of the regular guest judges on Supermodel Me. In Linkin Park's Burning In The Skies music video, Panichkul got a small role as the guy who broke a sweat and jumped out from fire.

== Filmography ==
=== Television ===
Year	Title	Role
1995	Khue Hattha Khrong Phiphop	Poj
1996	Baan Soi Dao	Aer Tawan
1996	Raboet Thoet Thoeng	Guest Role
1997	Kularb Tee Rai Nam	Support Role
1998	Krapong Baan Kah San	Zax
1999	Khun Chai	
2000	Narm Sai Jai Jing	Tatpoom / Thad / Teddy
2001	Songkram Dok Ruk	Tak
2003	Kularb Len Fai	Thipatai
2004	Rattamanee	Daniel
2006	Choolamoon Woon Rak	Apichai
2014	Woon Nuk Ruk Tem Barn	Guy
2014	Hormones: The Series Season 2	Pin
2015	Jad Rak Wiwa Luang	Kim
2015	Rak Rae	Nikolai
2016	Patiharn	Angel
2016	Chai Nai Sai Mok	Arm
2018	Wake Up Ladies	Boss (Guest)
2019	Wolf	Patrick
2019	Aruna 2019	Yang
2020	My Name Is Busaba	Kim
2021	Girl2K	Mr. Prom
2022	Unforgotten Night	Evan
2022	Club Friday Love & Belief	Top
2023	Past-Senger	Kiao
2023	Shadow	Brother Anurak

=== Film ===
Year	Title	Role
2016	Fathers	Phoon

=== Host ===
Year	Title
2004–2015	Incredible Tales
2007	Miss Earth 2007
2013	Miss Grand International 2013
2014	The Face Thailand season 1
