= Metinee Kingpayome =

Thai actress, model, tv host, producer and beauty pageant titleholder

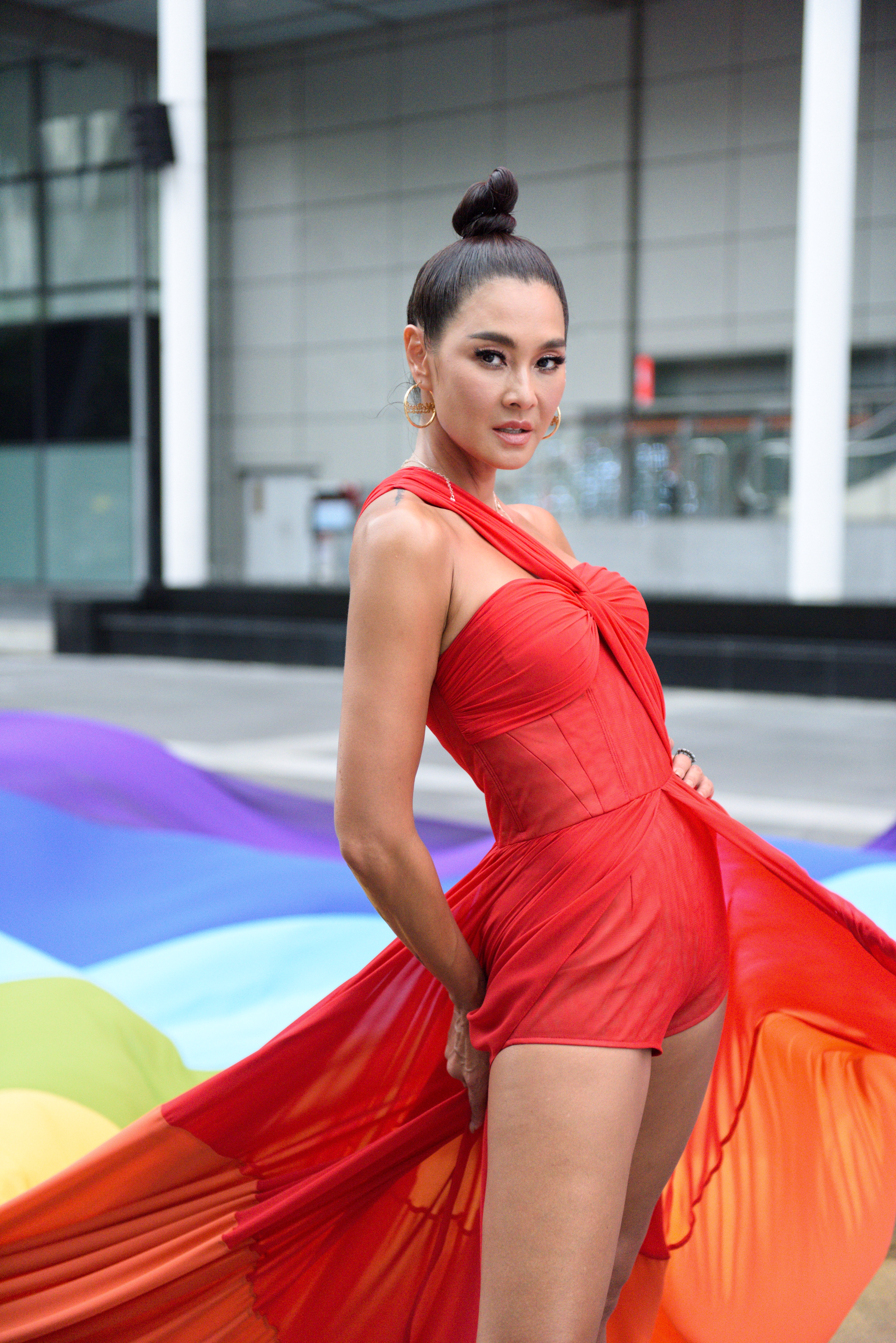
- Born: Metinee Washington Kingpayome; 11 June 1972 (age 54); Baltimore, Maryland, U.S.
- Occupations: Actress; model; producer; TV presenter
- Spouse: Edward Sharples (m. 2007; div. 2024)
- Children: 1
- Beauty pageant titleholder
- Title: Miss Thailand World 1992
- Years active: 1992–present
- Major competitions: Miss Thailand World 1992 (Winner); Miss World 1992; (Miss Continental Queens Asia & Oceania)

Metinee Washington Kingpayome (Thai: เมทินี วอชิงตัน กิ่งโพยม, RTGS: Methini Wochingtan Kingphayom, born 1972), later Metinee Kingpayome Sharples, also known as Lukkade (Thai: ลูกเกด, RTGS: Lukket) is a Thai actress, model, tv host, producer and beauty pageant titleholder who represented Thailand at Miss World 1992 and Miss World Asia & Oceania 1992.

== Biography ==
The daughter of Thai father and Thai mother, Kingpayom was born in Maryland and raised in Queens, New York City. She has three younger brothers.

She won the Miss Thailand World title before she represented Thailand at the Miss World 1992 pageant in South Africa. There, she was crowned Continental Queen of Asia & Oceania.

She has since worked as a model, actress and TV presenter. She has been featured on the covers of Elle Thailand and Vogue Thailand. The Bangkok Post described her as: "At the forefront of the women's liberation movement in the Thai fashion industry,"

She was one of Channel V's first VJ presenters; and she was also nominated TV Gold Award for Best Actress for Manya Ritsaya (1998). She subsequently won Golden Doll Award (Phra Surasawadi Royal Award) for Best Actress for her debut movie role in Box (1998).

She is also a mentor for The Face Thailand (season 1-4),The Face Men Thailand (season 1-2).

She established MUSE by METINEE with her brother Mark Kingpayom to teach students personality empowerment and growth-mindset development through catwalk and beauty queen techniques. The weekend course attracts students from across Thailand ages 4 and up, with some senior students in their fifties.

She has one son, Skye who has represented Thailand for swimming in international age-group competitions.

=== TV dramas ===
Year	Title	Network	Role	Note
1996	Aep Kep Chai Wai Klai Thoe	Channel 5	Bencha	Lead Role
1997	Saneha Phayabat	Channel 5	Katherine	Lead Role
1997	Sam Noom Sam Moom	Channel 7	Nat	Supporting Role
1998	Manya Ritsaya	Channel 5	Dini	Lead Role
1999	Sippaet Mongkut Sadut Rak	Channel 5	Prim	Lead Role
1999	Kla Wai Huachai Mai Jon Mum	Channel 5	Pim	Lead Role
1999	Pik Thong	Channel 7	Alin	Lead Role
2000	Sao Chai Huajai Chicago	Channel 5	Chichi	Lead Role
2000	Khun poo zu za	Channel 7		Guest Role
2001	Chai Krap Phom Pen Chai	Channel 5	Jazzy	Lead Role
2001	Tewada Dearn Din	Channel 3	Nong	Lead Role
2001	Plerng Maya	Channel 7	Metinee Kingpayome	Guest Role
2003	Thon	ITV	Daeng	Lead Role
2003	Seua	Channel 3	Nachan	Lead Role
2003	Muang Maya The Series - Maya Luang	Channel 5	Katherine Talor	Lead Role
2003	Rak Tong Uan	Channel 3	Imagination Chio	Supporting Role
2004	Phuying Chan Neung	Channel 3	Arinlada	Lead Role
2004	Lux Star : Ther Lerluck	Channel 5	Lerluck	Lead Role
2005	Maya Cafe	Channel 3	Mesini Trithep	Lead Role
2007	Butsaba Re Rak	Channel 7	Rongrong	Supporting Role
2007	Huachai Sila	Channel 5	Phimsuda (Mam)	Supporting Role
2009	Khunmae chamlaeng	Channel 3	Emy	Guest Role
2012	Saep Chio Puan Huachai	Channel 3	Anong	Supporting Role
2012	Doksok	Channel 5	Phenphak	Supporting Role
2014	Beauty and the Bitches	One 31	Natsarin "Nat" Rawirangsi	Main Role
2016	Beauty and the Bitches Season 2	One 31	Natsarin "Nat" Rawirangsi	Main Role
2018	Suphapburut Sut Soi	One 31	Aunt Cake	Guest Role
2018	Songkhram Nakpan	One 31	Alin "Elle" Seechatkaew	Lead Role
2019	Strange Girl in a Strange Land	Line Tv	Winnie	Main Role
2019	Songkhram Nakpan Season 2	One 31	Alin "Elle" Seechatkaew	Lead Role
2020	Why R U the series	One 31	Son, Sol	Guest Role
2021	Sam Noom Sam Moom×2	One 31	Nat	Guest Role
2022	My Sassy Princess	One 31	Prawfah	
2022	Bad Romeo	Channel 3	Asia Raman	Lead Role
2022	The War of Flowers	GMM 25	Tantawan	Lead Role
2023	Boy Band The Series	GMM 25	Selena	Lead Role
2023	Comedy Island	Prime Video	Citizen number 41	Guess Role
2023	VIP Rak Son Chu	One 31	Pojanee	Guess Role
2024	Thicha	One 31	Bussara Thanakitcharoenphon	Main Role
2025	The Successor	One 31		Support Role
2025	The Twin Gambit	One 31	Cindy	Support Role

=== Filmography ===
Year	Title	Role	Note	With
1998	Box	Jued's Wife	Lead Role	Udom Taepanich
2003	Province 77	Pearl	Supporting Role	
2004	Cholesterol Love	Lukkade	Lead Role	Watchara Tangkhapraserit
2004	Femme Fatale	Munta	Lead Role	
2005	The Bullet Wives	Maya; Second Wives Leader	Lead Role	
2006	Mercury Man	Arina	Lead Role	Wasan Khantaau
2009	Headless Family	Kanta	Lead Role	Chaturong Mokchok
2010	Sassy Player		Guest Role	
2016	Deadstock		Supporting Role	
2019	Blood Valentine	Kris	Lead Role	

=== TV Program ===
Year	Title	Role	Network
1996	Channel V Thailand	herself/ as VJ	Channel V, Thailand
1998	A E I For you	herself/ as host	
2014	The Face Thailand season 1	herself/ as mentor	Channel 3, Thailand
2015	The Face Thailand season 2	herself/ as mentor	Channel 3, Thailand
2016	The Star season 12	herself/ as commentator	One 31, Thailand
2016	Beauty and the Bitches The Casting Project	herself/ as judge	One 31, Thailand
2017	The Face Thailand season 3	herself/ as mentor	Channel 3, Thailand
2017	The Face Vietnam season 2	herself/ as guest	VTV3, Vietnam
2017	Asia's Next Top Model season 5	herself/ as guest	STAR World, Singapore
2017	The Face Men Thailand season 1	herself/ as mentor	Channel 3, Thailand
2018	Drag Race Thailand	herself/ as guest judge	Line TV, Thailand
2018	The Face Thailand season 4	herself/ as mentor	Channel 3, Thailand
2018	The Next Boy/Girl Band Thailand	herself/ as producer	Channel 7, Thailand
2018	The Face Men Thailand season 2	herself/ as master of mentor	PPTV, Thailand
2019	Drag Race Thailand Season 2	herself/ as guest judge	Line TV, Thailand
2020	Kui Zab Show	herself/ as host	One 31, Thailand
2021	Fake or Not?	herself/ as host	Scenario & Rachadalai
2022	Magic Wars	herself/ as judge	Workpoint TV, Thailand
2023	The New Mentor	herself/ as judge	VTVCab, Vietnam
2024	The Next Gentleman Season 2	herself/ as guest judge	VTVCab, Vietnam
2024	Drag Race Thailand Season 3	herself/ as main judge	WOWPresents, Thailand
2024	The Amazing Race Australia 8	herself/ as finish line greeter	Network 10, Australia
2025	The Social Warrior season 2	herself/ as master	Channel 7, Thailand
2026	Take Hormones Thailand	herself/ as sister	Youtube
2026	Surgery Wars	herself/ as Celeb master	Workpoint TV, Thailand
2026	The Social Warrior season 3	herself/ as master	Channel 3, Thailand

== Production ==
- Thailand's Perfect Man 2006 as Producer
- Miss Universe Thailand 2019 as Head Master of Team Expert
- Dancing with the Stars (2013) as Producer

Preceded by Issariya Apichai	Miss Thailand World; 1992	Succeeded by Maturose Kato Leaudsakda
