= The Face Thailand season 5 =

The Face Thailand
- Season 5
- Promotional poster
- No. of episodes: 13

Release
- Original network: Channel 3 LINE TV
- Original release: 23 February – 1 June 2019

Season chronology
- ← Previous; Season 4 Next → Season 6

The Face Thailand Season 5 was announced on February 15, 2019, at The Market Bangkok, M floor. In season 5, as in season 4, male and female contestants competed together.

Season 5 included new Mentors Toni Rakkaen, Maria Poonlertlarp, and Virahya Pattarachokchai. The winner of The Face Thailand Season 4, Anusit Saengnimnuan, a former contestant from The Face Men Thailand Season 1, and Antoine Pinto, MC in The Facemen Thailand Season 2, served as the host of the program. The program was first broadcast on February 23, 2019.

In this season each team had a competition for both men and women to compete together, and in part 2, the program launched Araya Indra, Polpat Asavaprapha, and Sabina Meisinger to be special Master Mentors in this season to advise the contestants.

== Contestants ==
(ages stated are at start of filming)

Contestant	Age	Height	Hometown	Model Coach		Master Mentor		Finish	Place
Bill Gielsager Sida	23	1.87 m (6 ft 1 1/2 in)	Denmark	Maria		Sabina		Episode 3	18–16
Emmy Kym Sawyer	17	1.73 m (5 ft 8 in)	Chiang Mai	Maria		Sabina		Episode 3	18–16
Liam Samuels	21	1.88 m (6 ft 2 in)	Chiang Mai	Gina/Bank		Art		Episode 3	18–16
Kanyarat "Mimi" Kattiya	22	Unknown	Unknown	Gina/Bank		Art		Episode 4	15
Pattirose "Posie" Elizabeth Samuels	23	Unknown	Chiang Mai	Maria		Sabina		Episode 5	14
Patipan "Tan" Khamwachirapitak	21	1.87 m (6 ft 1 1/2 in)	Unknown	Maria		Sabina		Episode 6	13
Nathas "Top" Tunjaroen	24	Unknown	Unknown	Toni		Moo		Episode 7	12–11
Matthew Christopher May	20	Unknown	Phuket	Toni		Moo		Episode 7	12–11
Panuput "Dream" Suttiruk	22	Unknown	Unknown	Maria		Sabina		Episode 8	10
Anastensia "Sia" Okoye	16	1.76 m (5 ft 9 1/2 in)	Unknown	Toni		Moo		Episode 9	9
Marcos Alexandre, Jr.	23	1.88 m (6 ft 2 in)	Brazil	Toni	Maria	Moo	Sabina	Episode 11	8
Nicha "Eve" Lertpitaksinchai	27	1.74 m (5 ft 8 1/2 in)	Bangkok	Toni		Moo		Episode 12	7–5
Sujeeporn "Minnie" Siangwong	22	Unknown	Unknown	Toni		Moo		Episode 12	7–5
Gregoire "Greg" de Bodt	21	Unknown	Bangkok	Gina/Bank		Art		Episode 12	7–5
I-rasa "Montra" Tantawan	25	1.73 m (5 ft 8 in)	Unknown	Gina/Bank	Toni	Art	Moo	Episode 13	4
Natharuetai "Zorzo" Akkarakijwattanakul	24	1.74 m (5 ft 8 1/2 in)	Samut Prakan	Gina/Bank		Art		Episode 13	3-2
Chutimon "Chompooh" Prasanwan	23	1.71 m (5 ft 7 1/2 in)	Phuket	Gina/Bank		Art		Episode 13	3-2
Kulchaya "Candy" Tansiri	23	1.77 m (5 ft 9 1/2 in)	Yala	Maria		Sabina		Episode 13	1

== Episodes ==
=== Episode 1: Casting Round ===
First airdate: February 23, 2019

The host, Antoine Pinto, launched the contestants with four Mentors, including Maria Poonlertlarp, Toni Rakkaen, Virahya Pattarachokchai, and Anusit Saengnimnuan, who selected the models to be on the team. After that, the host allowed the contestants to prepare for and walk in the first round, FACE SHOT RUNWAY. The contestants had to remove all makeup for the runway. Mentors had to vote on each contestant. If a contestant was approved by two out of three Mentors, the contestant was allowed to advance further.

=== Episode 2: Acting Skill and Team Selection Round ===
First airdate: March 9, 2019

- Featured photographer: Punsiri Siriwetchapun

Master Mentor	Team
Sabina	Maria
Art	Gina/Bank
Moo	Toni

=== Episode 3: Tresemmé Fashion Show ===
First airdate: March 16, 2019

- Winning coach and team: Toni Rakkaen
- Bottom four: Bill Sida, Emmy Sawyer, Liam Samuels & Montra Tantawan
- Eliminated: Bill Sida, Emmy Sawyer, Liam Samuels & Montra Tantawan (All four eliminated)

=== Episode 4: Join The Squad ===
First airdate: March 23, 2019

- Winning coach and team: Maria Poonlertlarp
- Bottom two: Top Tunjaroen & Mimi Kanyarat
- Eliminated: Mimi Kanyarat
- Featured Director: Vatanyu Ingkavivat

=== Episode 5: Love and Humanity ===
First airdate: March 30, 2019

- Winning coach and team: Gina Virayah and Bank Anusith
- Bottom two: Top Tunjaroen & Posie Samuels
- Eliminated: Posie Samuels
- Featured Photographer: Athiwat Toothongkham

=== Episode 6: This is New Belief ===
First airdate: April 6, 2019

- Winning coach and team: Gina Virayah and Bank Anusith
- Bottom three: Top Tunjaroen, Tan Khamwachirapitak & Greg de Bodt
- Eliminated: Tan Khamwachirapitak
- Special Mentor: Peach Pachara

=== Episode 7: Fashion video skincare products ===
First airdate: April 13, 2019

- Winning coach and team: Maria Poonlertlarp
- Bottom four: Chompooh Prasanwan, Marcos, Matthew & Top Tunjaroen
- Eliminated: Chompooh Prasanwan, Marcos, Matthew & Top Tunjaroen (all four eliminated)

=== Episode 8: Fashion video mobile phone ===
First airdate: April 20, 2019

- Winning coach and team: Gina Virayah and Bank Anusith
- Bottom three: Candy Tansiri, Eve Lertpitaksinchai & Dream Suttiruk
- Eliminated: Dream Suttiruk
- Return: Chompooh Prasanwan, Montra Tantawan, Marcos

=== Episode 9: Fashion Video eyecare product ===
First airdate: April 27, 2019

- Winning coach and team: Gina Virayah and Bank Anusith
- Bottom two: Candy Tansiri & Sia Okoye
- Eliminated: Sia Okoye

=== Episode 10: Music video ===
Firisr airdate:May 4, 2019

- Winning coach and team: Toni Rakkaen
- Bottom two: Greg de Bodt & Marcos
- Eliminated: No eliminated

=== Episode 11: Fashion video haircare product ===
First airdate:May 11, 2019

- Winning coach and team: Gina Virayah and Bank Anusith
- Bottom two: Eve Lertpitaksinchai & Marcos
- Eliminated: Marcos

=== Episode 12: Catwalk show ===
First airdate:May 18, 2019

- Winning coach and team: Gina Virayah and Bank Anusith
- Winning Challenge: Chompooh Prasanwan
- Top 3 selected: Montra Tantawan, Zorzo Akkarakijwattanakul, Candy Tansiri
- Eliminated: Greg de Bodt, Minnie Siangwong & Eve Lertpitaksinchai

=== Episode 13: Final walk ===
First airdate:May 25, 2019

- Winning coach and team: Maria Poonlertlarp
- Winner: Candy Tansiri
- Runner-up: Zorzo Akkarakijwattanakul, Chompooh Prasanwan
- Eliminated: Montra Tantawan

== Summaries ==
=== Elimination Table ===
Team Maria	Team Toni	Team Gina & Bank

Contestant	Episodes													
Contestant	2	3	4	5	6	7	8		9	10	11	12	13	
Challenge Winner	Greg	—N/a	Candy, Marcos	Eve, Greg	Marcos	Candy, Greg	Zorzo		Marcos, Greg, Montra	Marcos	Montra	Chompooh	—N/a	
Candy	IN	IN	WIN	IN	IN	WIN	IN	LOW	LOW	IN	IN	LOW	LOW	WINNER
Chompooh	IN	IN	IN	WIN	WIN	OUT	JOIN	RET	WIN	IN	WIN	WIN	LOW	RUNNER-UP
Zorzo	IN	IN	IN	WIN	WIN	IN	IN	WIN	WIN	IN	WIN	WIN	WIN	RUNNER-UP
Montra	IN	OUT					JOIN	RET	IN	WIN	IN	LOW	OUT	
Greg	IN	IN	IN	WIN	LOW	IN	IN	WIN	WIN	LOW	WIN	OUT		
Eve	IN	WIN	IN	IN	IN	IN	IN	LOW	IN	WIN	LOW	OUT		
Minnie	IN	WIN	IN	IN	IN	IN	IN	IN	IN	WIN	IN	OUT		
Marcos	IN	WIN	IN	IN	IN	OUT	JOIN	RET	IN	LOW	OUT	JOIN		
Sia	IN	WIN	IN	IN	IN	IN	IN	IN	OUT			JOIN		
Dream	IN	IN	WIN	IN	IN	WIN	IN	OUT				JOIN		
Matthew	IN	WIN	IN	IN	IN	OUT	JOIN					JOIN		
Top	IN	WIN	LOW	LOW	LOW	OUT	JOIN					JOIN		
Tan	IN	IN	WIN	IN	OUT		JOIN					JOIN		
Posie	IN	IN	WIN	OUT			JOIN					JOIN		
Mimi	IN	IN	OUT				JOIN					JOIN		
Liam	IN	OUT					JOIN					JOIN		
Bill	IN	OUT					JOIN					JOIN		
Emmy	IN	OUT					JOIN					JOIN		

The contestant was part of the winning team for the episode.
The contestant was part of the winning team for the episode with other contestants.
The contestant was at risk of elimination.
The contestant was immune from elimination.
The contestant was at risk of elimination due to having the worst performance in the master class but was part of the winning team for the episode.
The contestant was at risk of elimination due to having the worst performance in the master class and was eliminated from the competition.
The contestant was eliminated from the competition.
The contestant was originally eliminated but was returned to the competition on their original team by the master Mentor of the winning team for the episode.
The contestant was originally eliminated but was returned to the competition and switched to a new team by the mastor Mentor of the winning team for the episode.
The contestant was originally eliminated but invited back as a guest in a campaign.
The contestant was a Runner-Up.
The contestant won The Face Thailand.

- Episodes 1 and 2 were the casting episodes. The final eighteen contestants were divided into teams of six as they were selected.
- In episodes 3, team Toni won the campaign. Maria nominated Bill, Sabina nominated Emmy, Gina and Bank nominated Liam while Art nominated Montra for elimination. Toni and Moo eliminated all of them.
- In episodes 6–9 The contestant was having the worst performance in the challenge was at risk of elimination despite being on the winning team.
- In episodes 7–9 The contestant was having the best performance in the challenge was immune from elimination.
- In episode 7, team Maria won the campaign. Marcos and Matthew automatically advancing into the elimination, Toni and Moo nominated Top while Gina Bank and Art nominated Chompoo for elimination. Maria eliminated all of them.
- In episode 8, team Gina and Bank won the campaign. After Dream was eliminated, Art Chose Montra Marcos and Chompoo returned to the competition. Art nominated Montra returned to Team Toni and nominated Marcos returned to Team Maria while Chompoo returned to her original team.
- In episode 10, team Toni won the campaign. Maria and Sabina nominated Marcos while Gina Bank and Art nominated Greg for the elimination. Toni didn't eliminate both of them.
- In episode 12, Chompoo won the campaign individually, automatically advancing into the finale. Toni Miria Gina and Bank were allowed to choose any one contestant to advance into the finale from the remaining Seven models. Candy automatically advancing into the finale. Toni chose Montra. Gina and Bank chose Zorzo. Eve Minnie and Greg were eliminated.
- In episode 13, Zorzo won the campaign individually, Zorzo, Chompoo and Candy were put through to the final runway show while Montra was eliminated. Toni was having no models left to compete.

=== Campaigns ===
- Episode 1: Runway (Casting)
- Episode 2: Acting and Self Administered 'Transformations' (Casting)
- Episode 3: Hair Fashion Show with Vertical Runway (TREseme)
- Episode 4: Slow Motion Fashion Video (TONEBOX)
- Episode 5: Pre-wedding photoshoot
- Episode 6: Fashion Video with Car (CHR)
- Episode 7: Fashion Video with Skincare products (LAMP)
- Episode 8: Fashion Video with Mobile Phone (HUAWEI)
- Episode 9: Fashion Video with Eyecare product (VISION)
- Episode 10: Music video with Comfort
- Episode 11: Fashion video with haircare products (TREseme)
- Episode 12: Catwalk show
- Episode 13: Acting and Final walk.
