= Khemanit Jamikorn =

Thai actress, model and singer (born 1988)

- เขมนิจ จามิกรณ์
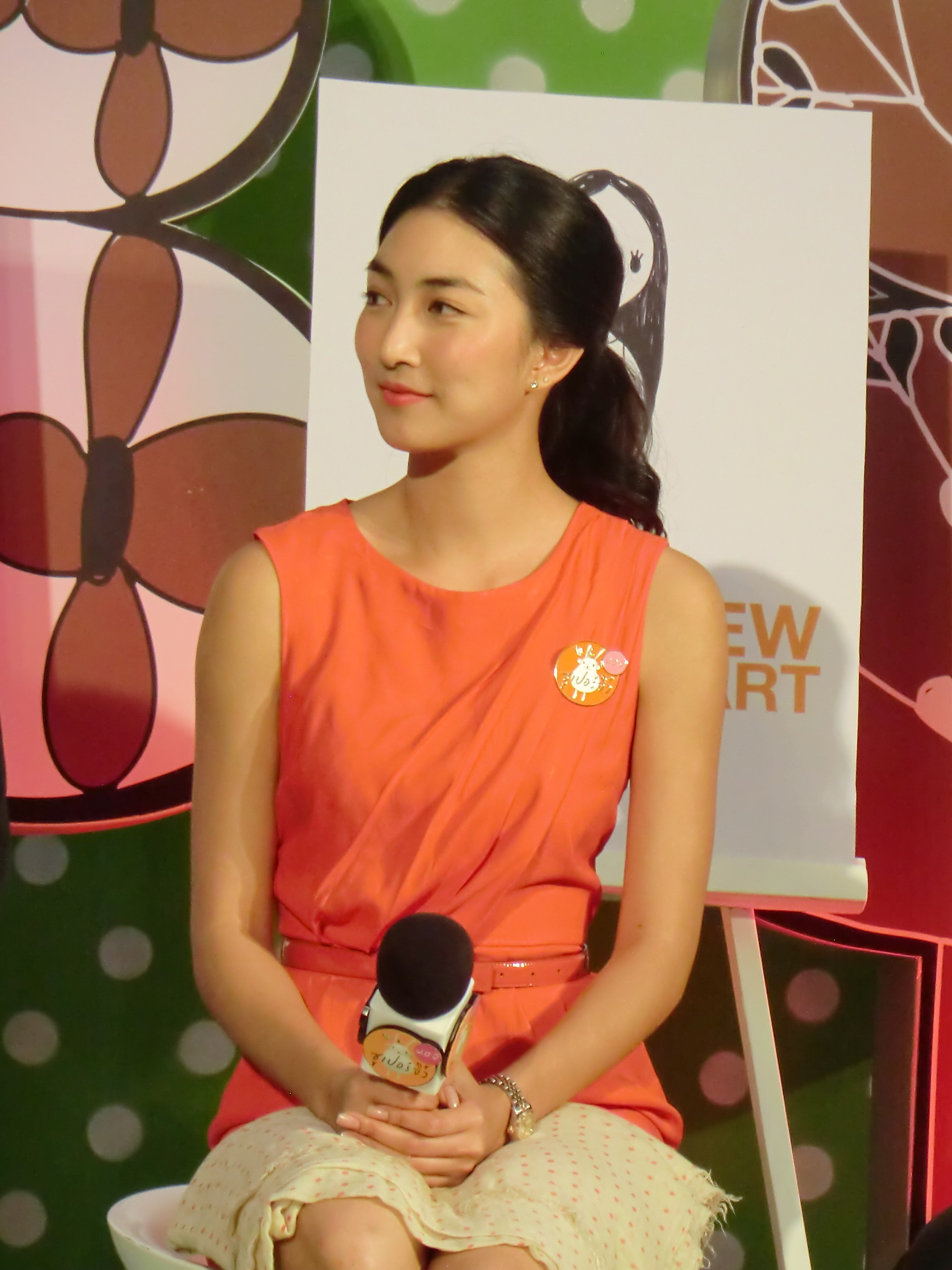
- Khemanit at the SuperJiew event in 2010
- Born: Chayanit Jamikorn (Thai: ชญานิษฐ์ จามิกรณ์); 27 May 1988 (age 38); Bangkok, Thailand
- Other name: Pancake
- Education: Kasetsart University (BA) Ramkhamhaeng University (MD)
- Occupations: Actress; singer; model; MC
- Years active: 2004–present
- Title: Thai Supermodel Contest 2004 (Winner); Model of the World 2004 (Winner)
- Spouse: Saksunthorn Premanon (m. 2022)

Signature
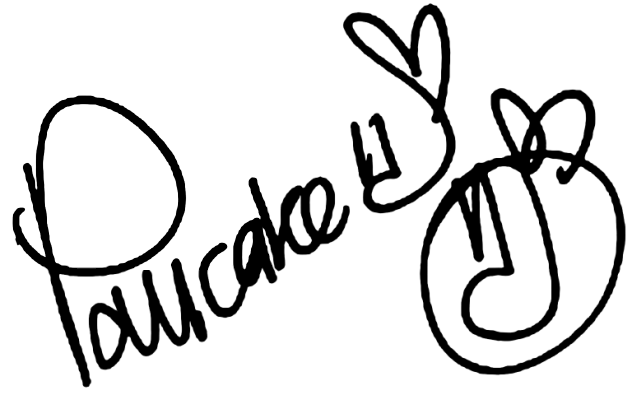

Khemanit Jamikorn (Thai: เขมนิจ จามิกรณ์, RTGS: Khemanit Chamikon; born 27 May 1988), nicknamed Pancake (Thai: แพนเค้ก), is a Thai TV actress, singer, and model. She won Thai Supermodel Contest 2004 and later won Model of the World 2004 in China.

== Career ==
Khemanit began acting in the Thai lakhon industry in 2005 when she was barely seventeen. Khemanit shot to fame in 2010 through the Channel 7 TV lakhon Thoe Kap Khao Lae Rak Khong Rao (เธอกับเขาและรักของเรา). Since then she has appeared in numerous Thai television soap operas as well as TV commercials. She is also affectionately hailed by the media as the "Queen of Advertising" for consistently being the face of many prestigious brands such as Toyota, Samsung, Coca-Cola, Canon, Sunsilk, NetDesign, Dentyne Xylitol, Mistine, etc. She has received many awards and honours, including the Hua Ding Asian Artist Popularity Award held in 2012 in Beijing as well as the title of 'Favorite Female Artist of the Greater China Region'.

== Personal life ==
Born and raised in the Bang Khen area of Bangkok (now Chatuchak district). Her mother used to work at Thai Airways, which made her want to become an air hostess since childhood. Her maternal grandfather, Preeda Rodphothong, formerly the 10th Director-General of the Thailand Department of Physical Education. On June 10, 2022, Pancake married her longtime police inspector boyfriend, Saksunthorn Premanon.

== Filmography ==
=== Films ===
| Year | Thai title | English title | Role | Ref. |
|---|---|---|---|---|
| 2015 | ป้าแฮปปี้ SHE ท่าเยอะ | Miss Happy | Peesuk | |
| 2020 | พจมาน สว่างคาตา | Pojaman the Legacy | Pojaman | |
| 2022 | คืนหมีฆ่า | The World of Killing People | Som | |
| 2022 | มายาพิศวง | Six Characters | Amara | |

=== Television ===
| Year | Title | Role | Ref. |
|---|---|---|---|
| 2005 | Young Detective of Love | Alin | |
| 2006 | Turn the Ground Towards the Star | Rada | |
| 2006 | Sainam Sam Cheewit | Young Kaeoprayong | |
| 2007 | Apimaheuma Maha Setee | Ongin Akaramahamasakul | |
| 2007 | Edge of Diamond's Karat | Karat | |
| 2007 | The Merry Dancing Doll | Intuorn | |
| 2008 | Dragon Palace | Lalla | |
| 2008 | Khun Noo Taewada | Alice | |
| 2008 | Muay Inter | Chayanuch Jittinan | |
| 2008 | Search for the Sunlight | Linin | |
| 2009 | Pleng Ruk Kaam Pob | Nokyoong | |
| 2009 | A Lasso for A Swan | Pimlapas | |
| 2009 | Buang Rai Pye Ruk | Paramee/Pram | |
| 2010 | Evening Glow | Tawan / Yorsaeng Dechabodin / Duangporn | |
| 2010 | The Vow of Vengeance | Worada / Nattamon | |
| 2010 | Our Possible Love | Pangrum | |
| 2011 | Thawiphop | Maneechan | |
| 2011 | Nang Fah Kap Mafia | Maekala | |
| 2012 | Pepper and Salt | Jeed | |
| 2013 | Frontier of the Heart | Sopeet | |
| 2014 | Crown of Wings | Triapsorn | |
| 2015 | Ring of Lust | Pit / Praewpan | |
| 2015 | Rak Rae | Wayoon | |
| 2016 | Jao Wayha: Fang Nam Jarod Fang Fah | Mina Apharat | |
| 2016 | True Love Story | Bonus | |
| 2016 | Tian Mimi Love for Eternity | Herself | |
| 2017 | Sri Ayodhaya | Bussaba | |
| 2019 | Don't Sleep My Hero | Pink | |
| 2019 | Voice | Captain Irin | |
| 2019 | Sri Ayodhaya 2 | Bussaba | |
| 2020 | Call me...mother | Ticha | |
| 2021 | I Need Romance | Najai | |
| 2022 | Club Friday Love & Belief: Marriage License | Rung | |
| 2023 | The Flower Detective | Prao | |
| 2023 | 23:23 | Risa | |
| 2023 | Treasure War | Erin | |
| 2023 | Hangout | Somsuda | |
| 2024 | Time | Melanee | |
| 2024 | The Scent of Hers | Sirin | |
| TBA | An Affair of Life | Chomnat | |
| 2026 | Plerng Phra Nang | Tawanthip | |

== Hosting ==
=== Television ===
- 2022 : Magic War สงครามมายากล ทุกวันพุธ เวลา 20.05 น. On Air Workpoint TV (กด 23) ร่วมกับ เกียรติ กิจเจริญ (เริ่มวันพุธที่ 2 มีนาคม 2565)

== Awards and nominations ==
| Year | Award | Category | Nominated work | Result | Ref. |
|---|---|---|---|---|---|
| 2004 | Thai Super Model Contest | Editor's Choice | None | Won | |
| 2004 | Model of the World Contest | Model of the World | None | Won | |
| 2006 | Top Awards | Best Rising Actress | Plik Din Su Dao | Won | |
| 2006 | Star Entertainment Awards | Best Rising Actress | Plik Din Su Dao | Won | |
| 2006 | Young Generation Choice Awards | Best Rising Actress | Plik Din Su Dao | Won | |
| 2006 | Teens Choice Awards | Seventeen Choice Actress | Plik Din Su Dao | Won | |
| 2007 | Star Party Anniversary | Actress of the Night | None | Won | |
| 2007 | ZEN Stylish Women's Awards | Best Dress | None | Won | |
| 2007 | Top Awards | Best Leading Actress in a Drama | Liempeth Karat & Tukata Lung Labum | Nominated | |
| 2007 | Sudsapda Young and Smart Vote | Best Actress | Liepeth Karat | Won | |
| 2007 | Slimming Idol Awards | Slimming Best Figure | None | Won | |
| 2007 | OK Awards | Hottest Actress | None | Won | |
| 2007 | Teens Choice Awards | Seventeen Choice Actress | None | Won | |
| 2007 | Siamdara Star Awards | Actress of the Year | None | Won | |
| 2007 | Popularity Award | Most Popular Actress | None | Won | |
| 2008 | Nine Entertainment Awards | Most Popular Actress | None | Won | |
| 2008 | Sudsapda Young and Smart Vote | Young and Smart Model | None | Won | |
| 2008 | Top Awards | Best Leading Actress in a Drama | Soo Sang Tawan | Nominated | |
| 2008 | Siam Dara Awards | Best Actress | Soo Sang Tawan | Nominated | |
| 2008 | Sharp Awards | Most Popular Actress | None | Nominated | |
| 2008 | Oho Awards | Most Favorite Presenter | None | Won | |
| 2008 | TV Pool Awards | Best Outfit | None | Won | |
| 2008 | Star Idol Awards | Outstanding Performance by an Actress | Soo Sang Tawan | Won | |
