= Toni Rakkaen =

Thai model, actor and hair stylist

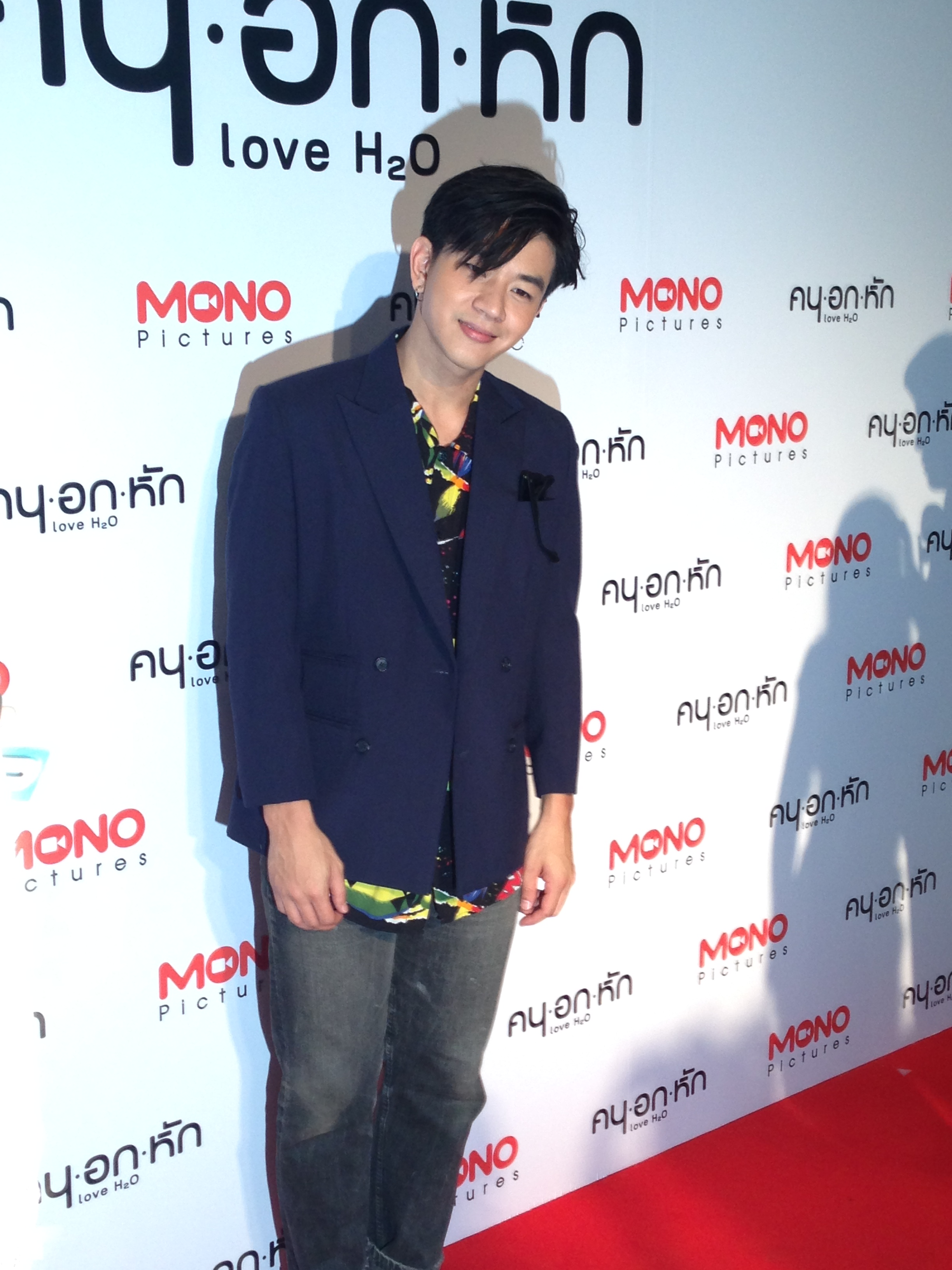
- Toni at press conference of Love H2O (2015)
- Born: Theerachai Wimolchaireuk Thai: ธีรชัย วิมลชัยฤกษ์ January 21, 1982 (age 44); Songkhla, Thailand
- Education: Royal Melbourne Institute of Technology (BA)
- Occupations: Actor; Singer; hair stylist; Businessperson; YouTubers
- Years active: 2008–present
- Spouse: Jarinya Sirimongkolsakul (m. 2020)
- Parents: Theppaboot Wimonchairerk (father); Banyen Rakgan (mother)
- Relatives: Annie Rakkaen; Kandy Rakkaen

Theerachai Wimolchaireuk (Thai: ธีรชัย วิมลชัยฤกษ์; RTGS: Thirachai Wimonchairoek; born January 21, 1982), known professionally as Toni Rakkaen, is a Thai actor and hair stylist. His mother, Banyen Rakkaen, is a Mor Lam artist and a Thai National Artist.

== Early life and education ==
Rakkaen was born to a Thai French-Vietnamese father and a Thai mother, Banyen Rakkaen. When he was 12 years old, Rakkaen moved to Melbourne, Australia with his two older sisters. While in Australia, he attended high school and Royal Melbourne Institute of Technology university. Before moving back to Thailand, Rakkaen worked as a hairstylist. He later worked for the Leo Burnett advertising agency as an intern. After featuring in Cleo, Rakkaen took a job at The Lounge Hair Salon. Apart from his hair-styling career, he started acting with Big Boy. Following his 2010 film debut, Rakkaen primarily appeared in romantic comedy films and drama television shows up to 2013.

== Filmography ==
- Big Boy (2010)
- Loser Lover (2010)
- Bangkok Sweety (2011)
- Valentine Sweety (2012)
- 3 A.M. 3D (2012)
- Love in the Rain (2013)
- Pob Na Pluak (2014)
- How to Win at Checkers (Every Time) (2015)
- Love H2O (2015)
- Sanap (2015)
- Midnight University (2016)
- The Moment (2017)

== Television ==
=== TV series ===
- Loma Kla Tha Fan (Channel 9, 2011)
- Suepsuan Puan Kamlang 3 (Channel 3, 2011)
- Tawan Chai Nai Marn Mak (Channel 3, 2012)
- Manee Sawat (Channel 3, 2013)
- Farm Euy Farm Ruk (Channel 3, 2013)
- Prissana (PPTV, 2015)
- Jao Sao Kong Arnon (PPTV, 2015)
- Club Friday The Series Season 6 (GMM25, 2015)
- Love Songs Love Stories (GMM25, 2016)
- Senior Secret Love : Bake Me Love (2016)
- Plerng Kritsana The Series : Lai Hong (GMM25, 2016)
- Club Friday The Series Season 8 (GMM25, 2016)
- Home Stay (2017)
- Project S the Series: S.O.S. (2017)
- 7 Wan Jorng Wen Series Season 2 (Workpoint, 2017)
- Naeo Sutthai (GMM25, 2018)
- Love Bipolar (GMM25, 2018)
- Club Friday: The Series 10 - Rak nokchai (GMM25, 2018)
- i STORIES (GMM25, 2018)
- Wolf - Game la thoe (GMM25, 2018)
- A Gift for the People You Hate (GMMTv, 2019)
- 7 Wun Jorng Wen Series Season 3 (Workpoint, Upcoming)

=== TV Program ===
- The Face Men Thailand (season 2) (PPTV, 2018)
- The Face Thailand (season 5) (CH3, 2019) with Maria Poonlertlarp, Gina Virahya, Bank Anusith

== MC ==
Online

- 2019: PHOTOGLOBE ep 1 On Air YouTube: ULN Channel
- 2021: [Just Another Home Tour] EP 1 On Air YouTube: ULN Channel
- 2021: The Weekend | วันว่างไม่อยากว่าง | EP 1 On Air YouTube: ULN Channel
- 2022: [PHOTOGLOBE] Maldive [EP. 1] On Air YouTube: ULN Channel
