= Fated to Love You =

Fated to Love You may refer to:

- Fated to Love You (2008 TV series), a Taiwanese television series
- You Are My Destiny (2014 TV series), a South Korean television series also known as Fated to Love You
- You're My Destiny (2017 TV series), a Thai television series

== See also ==
- You Are My Destiny (disambiguation)
