= Crazy Little Thing Called Love (disambiguation) =

"Crazy Little Thing Called Love" is a 1979 song by Queen.

Crazy Little Thing Called Love may also refer to:

- "Crazy Little Thing Called Love", a song by Rihanna from her 2006 studio album A Girl like Me
- "Crazy Little Thing Called Love", a season 6 episode of Degrassi: The Next Generation

== Other uses ==
- First Love (2010 Thai film), a Thai romantic-comedy also known by the title A Crazy Little Thing Called Love
