= Naphat Siangsomboon =

Thai actor and model (born 1996)

- ณภัทร เสียงสมบุญ
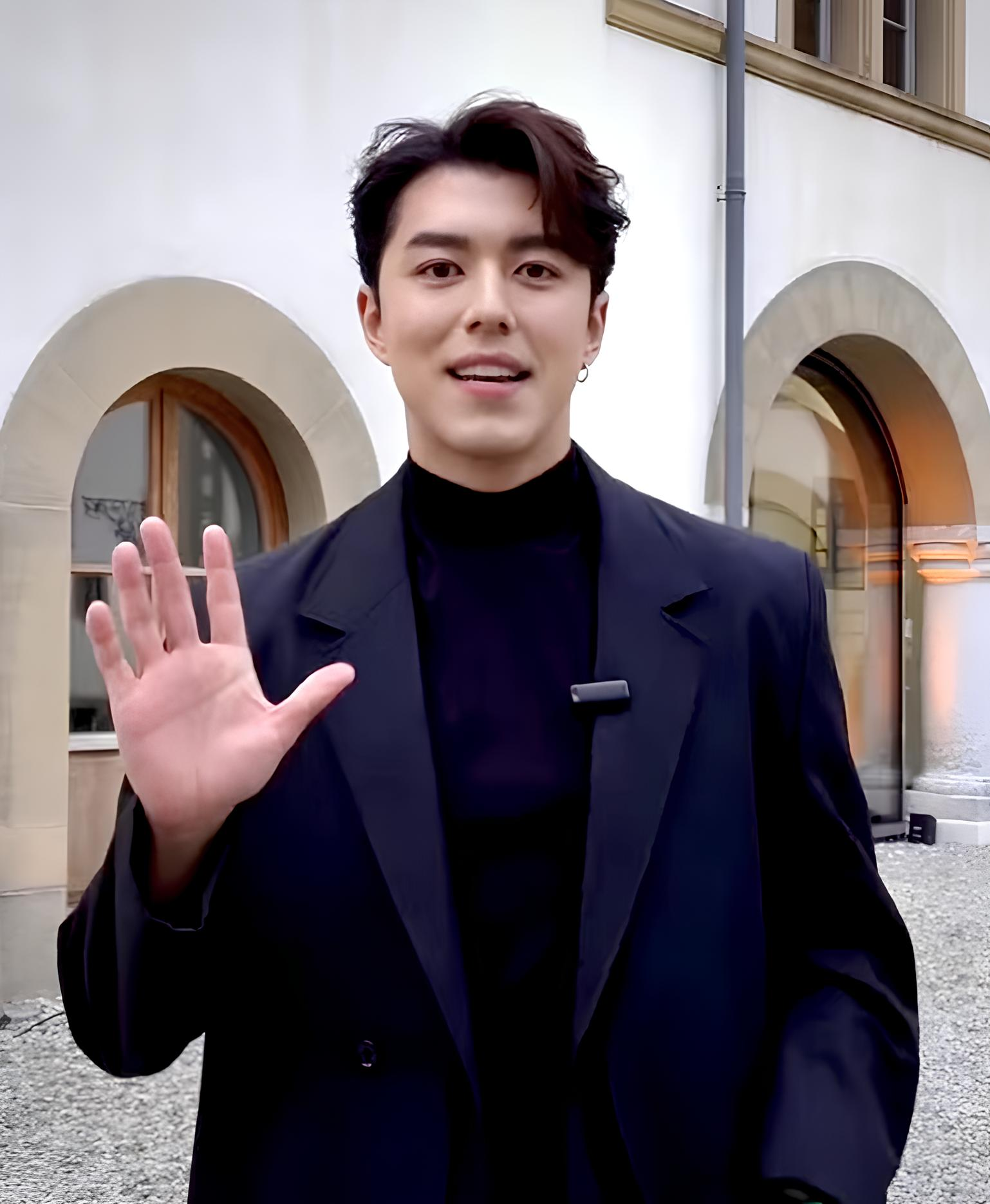
- Naphat in 2024
- Born: Naphat Siangsomboon; May 5, 1996 (age 30); Bangkok, Thailand
- Other names: Nine; Nine Naphat
- Education: Mahidol University International College
- Occupation: Actor
- Years active: 2015–present
- Modeling information
- Height: 1.85 m (6 ft 1 in)
- Hair color: Black
- Eye color: Brown
- Agency: Channel 3 (2015–2024)

Naphat Siangsomboon (Thai: ณภัทร เสียงสมบุญ, RTGS: Naphat Siangsombun, pronounced [ná.pʰát̚ sǐaŋ.sǒm.būn]; born May 5, 1996) is a Thai actor. He made his first on-screen appearance in Nivea For Men TV commercial, and came to public attention in King Power commercial. His debut film is A Gift (2016).

== Personal life ==
Naphat is the son of Pimpaka Siangsomboon, Thai actress and the second runner-up of Miss Thailand World 1988.

He graduated from Bromsgrove International School and Communication Design at Mahidol University International College, also known as MUIC.

In 2022, Pimchanok Luevisadpaibul and Siangsomboon officially announced their relationship, and their breakup in July 2024.

== Filmography ==
=== Television dramas ===
Year	English Title	Original Title	Role	Network	Notes
2017	Confusedly in Love	รักกันพัลวัน	Methakawin	Channel 3	Main role
2019	Tee Krai Tee Mun	Tee ใครทีมันส์	Trin	Channel 3	Main role
2022	A Tale of Ylang Ylang	สร้อยสะบันงา	Tian	Channel 3	Main role
2023	Nobody's Happy If I'm Not	แค้น	Pitan	Channel 3	Main role
2026	Love’s Shattered Reflections	โทษฐานที่รักเธอ	Vayu / Piraka	Channel 3	Main role

=== Short Film ===
Year	English Title	Original Title	Role	Notes
2014	Rai Sin Sut	ไร้สิ้นสุด	Grandson of Vichai	Main role
2015	The Night at Studio One	The Night at Studio One	Nine	Main role
2023	RERUN	เส้นเรื่องเดิม	Chou	Main role

=== Film ===
Year	English Title	Original Title	Role	Notes
2016	A Gift	พรจากฟ้า	Beam	Main role
2019	Friend Zone	Friend Zone ระวัง..สิ้นสุดทางเพื่อน	Palm	Main role
2024	Mana Man	มานะแมน	Mana	Main role

=== Television series ===
Year	English Title	Original Title	Role	Network	Notes
2017	Thiao Thai The: Trip Lang Jai 1	เที่ยวไทยเท่ ตอน ทริปล้างใจ 1	Ten	Amazing Thailand	Main role
2018	Thiao Thai The: Trip Lang Jai 2	เที่ยวไทยเท่ ตอน ทริปล้างใจ 2	Ten	Amazing Thailand	Main role
2020	Love You My Arrogance	สปาร์คใจนายจอมหยิ่ง	Sun	Channel 3	Main role
2022	Love You My Arrogance 2	สปาร์คใจนายจอมหยิ่ง 2	Sun	Channel 3	Main role
2026	The Last Duel	หงสาวดี	Mingyi Swa	One31	Main role
TBA	The Witch of Siam	แม่มดแห่งสยาม	Mek / Siman	TrueVisions NOW	Main role

=== Music video appearance ===
Year	Title	Artist
2016	"Yes, I Do" (อาจจะเป็นเธอ)	KLEAR feat.Polycat
2020	อยากเริ่มต้นใหม่กับคนเดิม (REPEAT)	Ink Waruntorn
2021	ในฝัน	Burin Boonvisut
2021	ใจอ้วน / Sugar High	STAMP feat. YOUNG K of DAY6
2023	เส้นเรื่องเดิม (RERUN)	PP Krit

== Musical theatre ==
Year	English Title	Original Title	Role	Number of performances	Venue
2025	Gangster 2499 The Musical	อันธพาล 2499 The Musical	Dang Bireley	32	Muangthai Rachadalai Theatre

== Discography ==
Year	Title	Note
2016	คนไม่มีสิทธิ์ (A Person Who Doesn't Have the Right)	EDS Special songs
2017	ฉันจะรอ	OST. Confusedly in Love
2019	ฉันยัง (Cover)	OST. Tee Krai Tee Mun
2022	เทียงส่องใจ (Cover)	OST. A Tale of Ylang Ylang

== Voice acting ==
Year	Thai Title	Original Title	Role	Notes
2024	มหัศจรรย์อารมณ์อลเวง2	Inside Out 2	Lance	Thai Version

== MC ==
Online

- 2020 : Hello Nine Naphat EP1 On Air YouTube:Naphat Siangsomboon
- 2020 : Nataraja Awards 11th (Drama Awards Segment) with Karnklao Duaysienklao
- 2026 : Nataraja Awards 17th (Best Drama Awards Segment) with Porapat Srikajorndecha

== Endorsements ==
Year	Brand
2015	1. Nivea for Men
2015	2. King Power
2015	3. Mazda
2016	1. Mazda
2016	2. Glico
2016	3. Fluocaril
2016	4. New Balance
2016	5. Crystal Drinking Water
2016	6. Jabs
2017	1. Mazda
2017	2. Crystal Drinking Water
2017	3. Samsung Galaxy
2017	4. Panasonic
2017	5. Birdy 3 in 1
2017	6. Attack Soft Plus
2017	7. Dtac
2018	1. Crystal Drinking Water
2018	2. Thai Airways
2019	1. Crystal Drinking Water
2019	2. All member 7-11
2019	3. SB Design Square
2019	4. Bangkok Life
2019	5. SFplus
2020	1. Crystal Drinking Water
2020	2. GARMIN
2020	3. Vitamilk
2020	4. Nissin
2020	5. Vivo V20 Series
2020	6. Bangkok Life
2021	1. Crystal Drinking Water
2021	2. Meat Zero
2021	3. Bangkok Life
2022	1. Crystal Drinking Water
2022	2. Nescafe
2022	3. Allness collagen
2022	4. Scott
2022	5. Bangkok Life
2022	6. King Power
2022	7. BOTA-P Protein
2022	8. Dior Prestige
2023	1. Crystal Drinking Water
2023	2. Tops
2023	3. Klean&Kare
2023	4. True & Dtac
2023	5. Bangkok Bank
2023	6. VESPA
2023	7. Panasonic
2023	8. Clear Men
2024	1. Crystal Drinking Water
2024	2. Clear Men
2024	3. Lacoste Eyewear
2024	4. VESPA
2024	5. Panasonic
2025	1. Crystal Drinking Water
2025	2. Lacoste Eyewear
2025	3. Clear Men
2025	4. Lao Development Bank
2026	1. Crystal Drinking Water
2026	2. Revolax
2026	3. SHOKZ

== Awards and nominations ==
Year	Award	Category	Result	Nominated work
2017	Daradaily The Great Awards 6th	Hot Guy of the Year	Nominated	
2017	MThai Toptalk About 2017	The Most Top Talk-About Memorable Character	Won	
2017	KAZZ Awards	Popular Vote	Nominated	
2017	KAZZ Awards	Rising Star Best Actor	Nominated	
2017	Nine Entertain Awards	Family of The Year (shared with Pimpaka Siangsomboon)	Won	
2017	Maya Award	Most Charming Actor	Won	
2017	Srisan Entertainment Awards 2017	Charming Man of the Year	Won	
2018	Star's Light Awards 2017	Rising Star	Won	
2018	Sanook Vote of the Year 2017	National Husband	Won	
2018	MThai Top Talk-about 2018	The Most Top Talk-About Actor	Nominated	Rak Kan Panlawan
2018	Nataraja Awards 9th	Best Newcomer Actor	Won	Rak Kan Panlawan
2018	Thailand Headlines Person Of The Year Awards 2018	Culture and Entertainment	Won	
2020	Thailand Zocial Awards 2020	Best Entertainment on Social Media - Actor	Won	
2022	ContentAsia Awards 2022	Best Lead Actor	Nominated	A Tale of Ylang Ylang
2022	TVPool Stars Party Retire & Reborn 2022	Charming Male	Won	
2022	Thairath Talk Awards 2022	Inspiration of the Year	Won	
2023	Siamrath Online Awards 2023	Popular male actors	Won	A Tale of Ylang Ylang
2023	37th Golden Television Awards	Outstanding Leading Actor	Nominated	A Tale of Ylang Ylang
2024	Seoul International Drama Awards 2024	Outstanding Asian Star : Thailand	Nominated	Nobody's Happy If I'm Not
2026	Kazz Awards 2026	People Of The Year	Won	
2026	Pattaya International Film Festival 2026	Outstanding Series Actor	Won	The Last Duel
2026	Praew Awards 2026	Actor of the Year	Won	The Last Duel
2026	FEED x KHAOSOD AWARDS 2026	Actor of the Year (Series-Drama)	Won	The Last Duel
