= You Are My Destiny =

You Are My Destiny or You're My Destiny may refer to:

== Music ==
- "You Are My Destiny" (song), a 1958 song by Paul Anka
- "Jai Ho! (You Are My Destiny)", a 2009 song by the Pussycat Dolls

== Television ==
- You Are My Destiny (2008 TV series), a 2008 South Korean series
- You Are My Destiny (2014 TV series), a South Korean series (also known as Fated to love you)
- You Are My Destiny (2020 TV series), a Chinese series with actress Liang Jie
- You're My Destiny (2017 TV series), a Thai series
- Fated to Love You (2008 TV series), a 2008 original Taiwanese television series also known as You're My Destiny

== See also ==
- Fated to Love You (disambiguation)
