= Suddenly It's Magic =

- Theatrical movie poster
- Directed by: Rory B. Quintos
- Screenplay by: Vanessa R. Valdez
- Story by: Enrico C. Santos; Vanessa R. Valdez
- Produced by: Charo Santos-Concio; Malou N. Santos
- Starring: Erich Gonzales; Mario Maurer
- Production company: ABS-CBN Film Productions, Inc.
- Distributed by: Star Cinema (Philippines); Triamorn (Thailand); Jalan (Singapore)
- Release date: October 31, 2012 (Philippines)
- Running time: 110 minutes
- Countries: Philippines; Thailand
- Languages: Filipino; Ilocano; Thai; English
- Box office: ₱97,196,663.00

Suddenly It's Magic is a 2012 Filipino-Thai romantic film directed by Filipino film director Rory Quintos, starring Filipina actress Erich Gonzales and Thai actor Mario Maurer. The film is produced by Star Cinema and was released on October 31, 2012, in the Philippines. On March 7, 2013, Baifern Pimchanok confirmed on her Twitter account that the movie will be screened in Thailand on March 14, 2013, at the Major Cineplex theater. Following Thailand's premiere of the movie, on March 25, 2013, Cambodia's Legend Cinemas confirmed on their Facebook fanpage of the official screening of the movie in the country on March 28, 2013.

The story depicts two star-crossed lovers: Marcus Hanson (Mario Maurer), a Thai superstar, and Joey Hermosa (Erich Gonzales), a Filipina baker. When Marcus decides to fly to the Philippines to escape from his career, he meets Joey. Even though their worlds collide, the two later fall in love. But their relationship is tested by conflicts from their worlds.

== Plot ==
Joey Hermosa (Erich Gonzales) and Marcus Hanson (Mario Maurer) only have two things in common. One: they live to make fairy-tale romances happen — Joey through her exquisite wedding cakes; Marcus through the numerous romantic comedies he stars in. Two: their own love stories do not have the fairy-tale happy endings — she was just recently dumped at the altar; he just discovered that his on-screen partner and real-life girlfriend had fallen in love with another man.

Desperate to escape the media frenzy and the intrusive questions of the public about his love life and career, Marcus impulsively decides to go on vacation in the Philippines where he meets Joey who is determined to move forward with her life. Marcus finds himself drawn to Joey's passion for baking, and rediscovers his love for acting. In love once again, he invites her to join him in Thailand. Joey refuses at first, but she eventually follows him to Bangkok and allows herself to fall in love again. But their love encounters opposition from Marcus’ fans who are desperate to see him reunite with his ex-girlfriend, and from his overprotective mother. Moreover, Joey's responsibilities back home cause a strain in their relationship. Despite their love for each other, Joey and Marcus begin to question if their dreams are worth sacrificing for holiday romance suddenly turned serious. Then when Marcus got accepted in Hollywood he remembered Joey and went back to the Philippines and surprised her and took a balloon and attached it to a paper that says "Marcus and Joey Forever".

== Cast ==
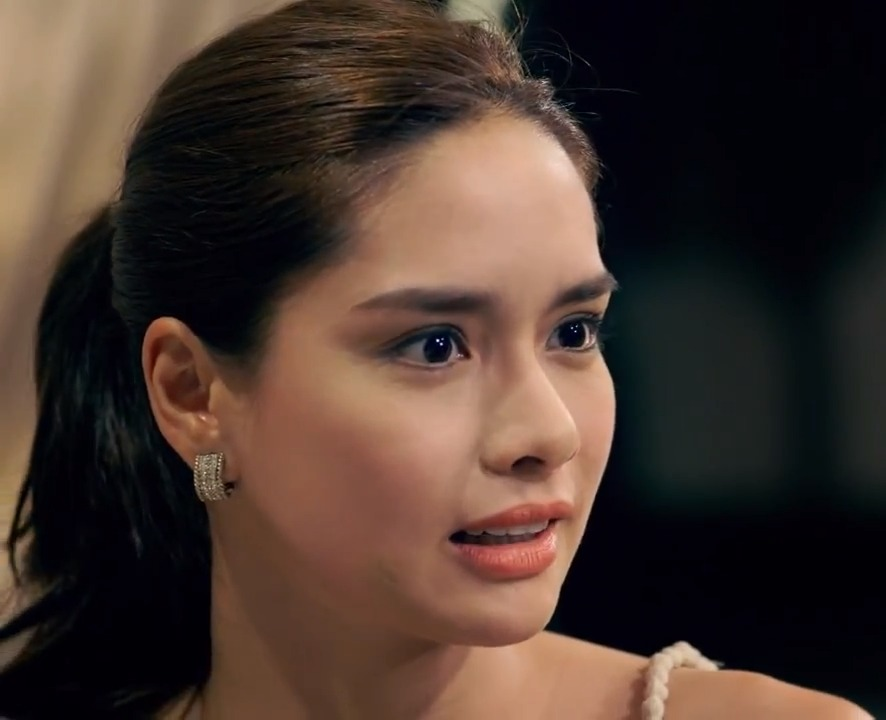
Erich Gonzales portrays Josephine "Joey" Hermosa

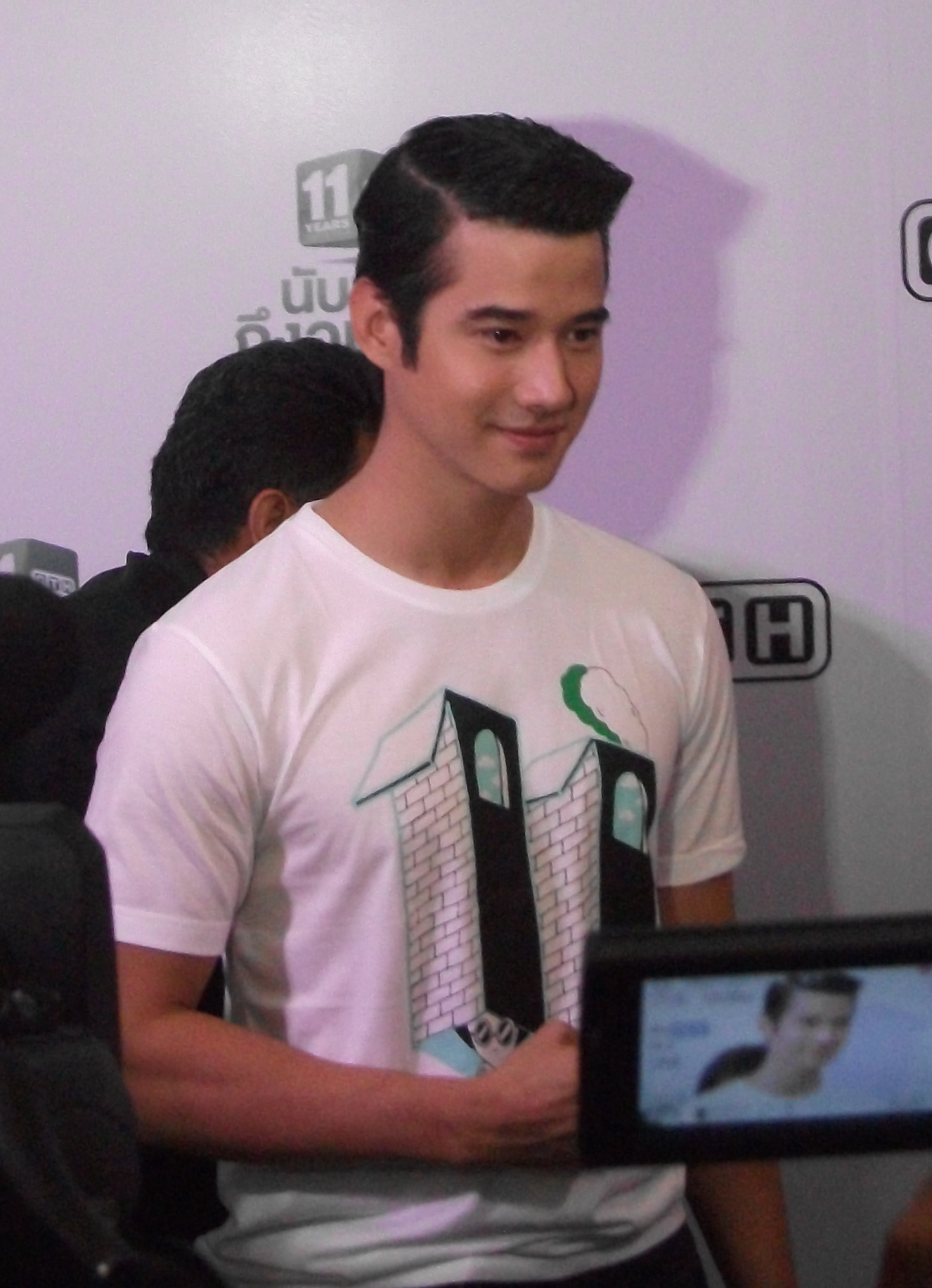
Mario Maurer portrays Marcus Hanson

- Erich Gonzales as Josephine "Joey" Hermosa
- Mario Maurer as Marcus Hanson
- Baifern Pimchanok as Sririta Taylor
- Joross Gamboa as Sam
- Cacai Bautista as Marj
- Ces Quesada as Tita Tetz
- Guji Lorenzana as Marvin
- Jestoni Alarcon as Governor Martinez
- Joy Viado† as Jinggay
- Dinkee Doo as Dan
- Dionne Monsanto as Ditas
- Michael Shaowanasai as Peter
- Apasiri Nitibhon as Mai
- Nana Dakin as Lalita
- Karinyut Jindawat as Mitr
- Jairus Aquino as Young Marcus
- Sharlene San Pedro as Young Joey

== Production ==
The idea of doing the movie is due to the impact of Thai movie Crazy Little Thing Called Love in the Philippines. Thai actor Mario Maurer became popular, resulting in a visit in the Philippines to become an endorser of a clothing brand, Penshoppe. During the visit, he signed a one-movie contract with Star Cinema that was expected to be released in early 2012. It was later confirmed by Maurer on his Fan Meeting that was held at the Philippine International Convention Center. ABS-CBN then released a statement that Erich Gonzales will be Maurer's love interest in the movie entitled Suddenly It's Magic. Gonzales revealed that she studied basic Thai language that she will be using in the movie. On the other hand, Maurer also practiced the Tagalog language. In April 2012, Maurer went back to the Philippines to shoot scenes in Paoay, Ilocos Norte, specifically in the Fort Ilocandia Hotel. In May of the same year, the team went to Bangkok, Thailand to shoot for a month with other Thai actors that were cast in the film. The shooting ended on June 19, 2012. There was an attempt to change the title to I'm in love with a Thai actor; however it did not push through. A cameo role for Pimchanok Luevisadpaibul was also confirmed by PR (official promoter of Maurer in the Philippines).

== International screenings ==
Here are some schedule dates and venues for the international screening of Suddenly It's Magic:

Date	Country
November 1	Singapore
November 9–15	United States: Las Vegas, Los Angeles-Cerritos, Los Angeles-North Hollywood, Los Angeles-Orange, Milpitas, San Bruno, San Diego, Union City, Hawaii
November 16–22	Sacramento
March 14, 2013	Bangkok, Thailand, Dubbed in Thai

== Box-office ==
The film was a box-office success in the Philippines, grossing a total of ₱97,196,663 in its theatrical run.

== Awards and nominations ==
Year	Award	Category	Nominated work	Result
2013	ASAP Pop Viewers' Choice Awards	Pop Movie	Suddenly It's Magic	Nominated
2013	ASAP Pop Viewers' Choice Awards	Pop Movie Theme Song	Suddenly It's Magic	Nominated
2013	ASAP Pop Viewers' Choice Awards	Pop Screen Kiss	Erich Gonzales and Mario Maurer	Nominated
2013	ASAP Pop Viewers' Choice Awards	Pop Love Team	Erich Gonzales and Mario Maurer	Nominated
