= Friendship (2008 film) =

2008 Thai film directed by Chatchai Naksuriya

- Thai movie poster
- Directed by: Chatchai Naksuriya
- Starring: Mario Maurer; Apinya Sakuljaroensuk
- Release date: July 3, 2008
- Running time: 115 mins
- Country: Thailand
- Language: Thai

Friendship (Thai: เฟรนด์ชิพ เธอกับฉัน) (also known as Friendship You and Me) is a 2008 Thai romantic drama film directed by Chatchai Naksuriya, starring Mario Maurer and Apinya Sakuljaroensuk (known for Ploy) . The film, set in 1972 and 1987, explores Singha and Mituna's love for each other; it opens in the present, before returning to their high-school days.

== Plot ==
Singha (Mario Maurer) receives a call from Jack, a high-school friend who sets up a reunion for their class. When they meet, they have a conversation which turns to Singha's last year of high school (when he met his first and only love, Mituna (Apinya Sakuljaroensuk).

At first, Singha and his friends mock Mituna for being quiet. He becomes friends with Lam, who helps him survive Kong (who tries to kill him) and becomes close to Singha's group. Singha ridicules Mituna when they become dance partners, but Mituna had fought back on the bus after she was ridiculed for helping a mute woman.

Singha follows Mituna, wanting to know where she lives. He asks her to forgive him, but Mituna does not want to talk to him. Singha's group, Jack and Kanda ask Mituna's mother to allow her to be part of their project to help educate children. At a bonfire, Singha reveals his favorite flower: Mituna.

Mituna's friend and Singha's group became close, help repair Mituna's house, and socialize. Singha and Mituna fall in love, and Lam is killed by Kong. Singha gives Mituna a paper to sign for their friendship book. She goes home, knowing that her family is moving away. On the final examination day, Mituna lies to Singha by telling him that she must go away for a few days. After taking the last exam, she leaves a note for Singha that they would talk on the result day.

Before the result day, Singha's father is transferred and they must move. On the result day, Singha waits for Mituna before leaving with his friends. He gets drunk and falls asleep; when he wakes up, he looks for Mituna at school and at home. He waits for her in the park, is apprehended by the police, but is recognized as the son of a sergeant.

At the reunion, his friends tell him that if Mituna wanted to see him she would have come. Singha goes upcountry for his job, and finds Mituna's mother. He meets with Mituna (who has AIDS), and they talk into the night until she dies in the early morning. Mituna's mother gives him her notes, in which she wrote that when she transferred to the school Singha became the most important person in her life.

== Cast ==
- Mario Maurer as Singha
- Apinya Sakuljaroensuk as Mituna
- Chalermpon Thikumporn Teerawong as Song
- Kanawat Chantaralawan as Jud Duang
- Shemm Madrid as Beautiful Lady
- Jetrin Wattanasin as Adult Singha
