= AI Love You (2022 film) =

Thai sci-fi rom-com film

- Directed by: David Asavanond; Stephan Zlotescu
- Starring: Pimchanok Leuwisetpaiboon; Mario Maurer
- Music by: Roman Molino Dunn
- Distributed by: Netflix
- Release date: 15 February 2022
- Running time: 95 minutes
- Language: Thai

AI Love You (Thai: เอไอหัวใจโอเวอร์โหลด) is a 2022 Thai sci-fi rom-com film created and written by Stephan Zlotescu for Netflix. The film was directed by David Asavanond and Stephan Zlotescu and stars Mario Maurer and Pimchanok Luevisadpaibul as the lead pair. The film is alternatively titled Laser Candy and AI Heart Overload.

The film is set in a world where artificial intelligence (AI) controls most buildings. One such AI named Dob that controls a corporate tower where a woman named Lana (Pimchanok Luevisadpaibul) works, falls in love with her after a software glitch. The AI then hijacks the body of a man, Bobby (Mario Maurer) and tries to win Lana's affections.

== Cast ==
- Pimchanok Leuwisetpaiboon as Lana
- Mario Maurer as Bobby
- David Asavanond as The Hawk
- Sahajak Boonthanakit as Mr. Wilson
- Michael S. New as Alan

== Music ==
AI Love You (Original Motion Picture Soundtrack)

Soundtrack album
- Released: February 15, 2022
- Length: 78:15
- Label: Mirrotone

AI Love You soundtrack album was composed by Roman Molino Dunn and released on February 15, 2022 by Mirrortone.

Tracklist
No.	Title	Length
1.	"AI Love You"	5:46
2.	"Laser Candy"	2:03
3.	"A Bit More Than Platonic"	1:18
4.	"Love Guru"	1:04
5.	"You are My Friend, Lana"	1:52
6.	"Get Busy"	2:48
7.	"Bob and Dob Get Personal"	3:32
8.	"Consciousness Download"	2:06
9.	"Human is Ridiculous"	1:27
10.	"Lit Bangkok"	2:02
11.	"How Humans Dwell"	2:20
12.	"Dreaming of Human Love"	0:50
13.	"Wonder, Weird, Worry"	1:14
14.	"Mr. Bob was Able to Find Me"	1:10
15.	"Human Melancholy"	1:51
16.	"Slay Bot"	4:09
17.	"Machine Hangover, AI Apologize"	1:44
18.	"Glitch You Out"	3:02
19.	"Filthy Mustache"	2:00
20.	"She Said Yes"	2:45
21.	"The First Touch"	1:36
22.	"Hipster Dads"	1:01
23.	"Get Up Get Up Get Download"	1:08
24.	"AI Could Kiss You Forever"	2:17
25.	"The Code In Your Eyes"	1:16
26.	"Rogue Reboot le"	3:37
27.	"We Can Make Love Work"	5:16
28.	"Hunting Rogue AI"	4:56
29.	"Initiate Reformat"	2:59
30.	"SSD-molish"	1:24
31.	"Once You Leave"	1:21
32.	"Highway to Memory Loss"	1:18
33.	"Megabyte Fyte"	1:40
34.	"System Restoration"	1:35
35.	"Closer Together"	1:42
Total length:		78:15
