= The Sand Princess =

2019 Thai television series

- Official series poster
- Thai: เจ้าหญิงเม็ดทราย
- Genre: Romantic comedy; Drama
- Created by: GMMTV
- Based on: เจ้าหญิงเม็ดทราย by Ancharee
- Starring: Pimchanok Luevisadpaibul; Worrawech Danuwong; Chutavuth Pattarakampol
- Country of origin: Thailand
- Original language: Thai
- No. of episodes: 14

Production
- Running time: 45 minutes
- Production companies: GMMTV; On & On Infinity

Original release
- Network: GMM 25; LINE TV
- Release: 24 August – 6 October 2019

The Sand Princess (Thai: เจ้าหญิงเม็ดทราย; RTGS: Chao Ying Met Sai) is a 2019 Thai television series starring Pimchanok Luevisadpaibul (Baifern), Worrawech Danuwong (Dan) and Chutavuth Pattarakampol (March).

Produced by GMMTV together with On & On Infinity, the series was one of the thirteen television series for 2019 launched by GMMTV in their "Wonder Th13teen" event on 5 November 2018. It premiered on GMM 25 and LINE TV on 24 August 2019, airing on Saturdays and Sundays at 21:25 ICT and 23:00 ICT, respectively. The series concluded on 6 October 2019.

== Cast and characters ==
Below are the cast of the series:

=== Main ===
- Pimchanok Luevisadpaibul (Baifern) as Kodnipa / Kod
- Worrawech Danuwong (Dan) as Kirakorn / Ki
- Chutavuth Pattarakampol (March) as Jirapat / Ji

=== Supporting ===
- Weerayut Chansook (Arm) as Wanchot / Chot
- Alysaya Tsoi (Alice) as Meaw
- Maneerat Kam-Uan (Ae) as Puang Petch (Ji's secretary)
- Leo Saussay as Jae
- Korn Khunatipapisiri (Oaujun) as Chon
- Duangta Tungkamani as Khunying Krongthong
- Virahya Pattarachokchai (Gina) as Aff
- Trin Settachoke
- Narumon Phongsupan as Ladda

=== Guest ===
- Supoj Janjareonborn (Lift) as Ji and Ki's father
- Jirakit Thawornwong (Mek) as Boom

== Soundtrack ==
Song title	Romanized title	Artist	Ref.
เจ้าหญิงของใครสักคน	Jao Ying Kaung Krai Suk Kon	Kulamas Limpawutwaranon (Knomjean)	
รักหลับ	Rak Rub	Worrawech Danuwong (Dan)	
