= Thicha =

- Genre: Thriller; Drama
- Written by: Wattana Weerayawattana; Apisara Vongsorn
- Directed by: Ekkasit Trakulkasemsuk
- Starring: Pimchanok Luevisadpaibul; Pachara Chirathivat; Metinee Kingpayome
- Composers: Terdsak Janpan; Tontrakul Kaewyong; Phoowich Tawasinchanadech; Amornphat Sermsap; Preeda Kesdee; Kritamet Kittiboonyatiwakron; Narisara Sakpunjachot; Suntorn Duangdang; Thitirat Dilokhattakarn
- Country of origin: Thailand
- Original language: Thai
- No. of episodes: 8

Production
- Executive producers: Takonkiet Viravan; Nipon Pewnen
- Cinematography: Kittiwat Semarat
- Running time: 60 minutes
- Production company: GMM Grammy

Original release
- Network: One 31
- Release: 25 November – 17 December 2024

Thicha (Thai: ทิชา) is a Thai thriller drama series. First broadcast on One 31. It shows in reruns uncut version at 10:00 p.m. on Netflix and oneD application.

== Synopsis ==
Thicha is the story of Ouyi, the only daughter of Yeoh, a migrant worker who illegally entered Thailand. They hoped to change their fate and have a better life but everything turned out differently because they ran into Bussara's human trafficking ring. When Yeoh was killed by Bussara, Ouyi's fight to reclaim justice began under the name Thicha. Things get complicated when Ouyi/Thicha falls in love with Bussara's son.

== Cast ==
=== Main ===
- Pimchanok Luevisadpaibul as Ouyi / Thicha (adult)
- Pachara Chirathivat as Phatchai
- Metinee Kingpayome as Bussara Thanakitcharoenphon
- Penpak Sirikul as Ni Wai / Nivarin
- Namfon Kullanut as Yeoh
- Pornsroung Rouyruen as Phoo
- Akarat Nimitchai as Mathee Phonwisetlertsakul
- Anuchit Sapunpohng as Nitikorn
- Lerwith Sangsith as Worot Phisutthikorn
- Machida Sutthikulphanich as Ouyi (Young)
- Techin Na Wong as Phatchai (Young)
- Wacharapat Eksamutchai as Book (Young)

=== Guest ===
- Manapat Techakumphu as Book
- Supoj Pongpancharoen as Chi
- Tanapol Chuksrida as Sak
- Thiti Imanothai as Somphong Laochindachote
- Pitchayut Roongrojsub as Lek
- Chattiwut Rungrojsuporn as Armae
- Onuma Thammathurathorn as Ratima
- Phasamon Suphondechphong as Maid

== Original soundtrack ==
- ฟื้น (Reborn), theme by ASIA7
