= Pimchanok Luevisadpaibul =

Thai actress and model (born 1992)

- พิมพ์ชนก ลือวิเศษไพบูลย์
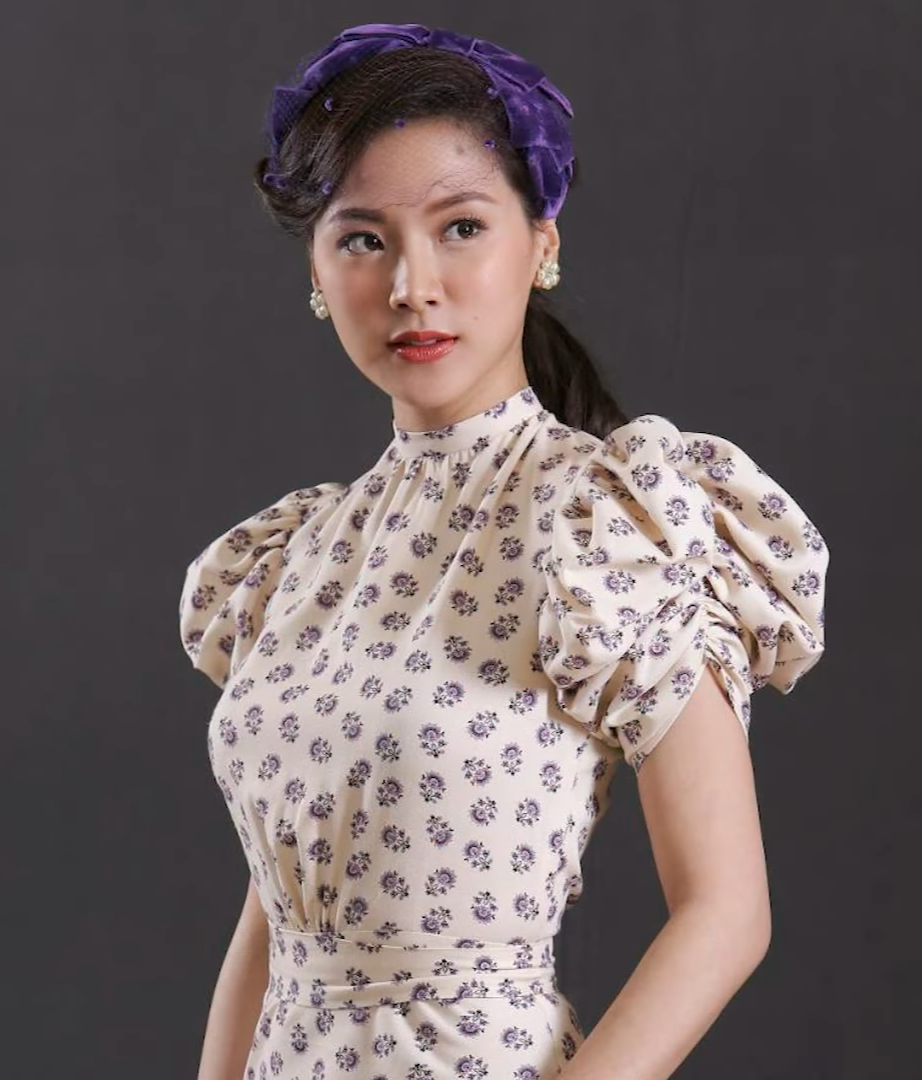
- Baifern in 2022
- Born: Pimchanok Luevisadpaibul; 30 September 1992 (age 33); Dusit, Bangkok, Thailand
- Other name: Baifern
- Education: Srinakharinwirot University
- Occupations: Celebrity; Singer; Model; Dubber; MC; YouTuber
- Years active: 2009–present
- Agent: Channel 7 (2010–2016)
- Height: 165 cm (5 ft 5 in)

Pimchanok Luevisadpaibul (Thai: พิมพ์ชนก ลือวิเศษไพบูลย์; born 30 September 1992), nicknamed Baifern (Thai: ใบเฟิร์น; lit. "Fern Leaf"), is a Thai actress and model. She rose to fame for her lead role as Nam in the 2010 sleeper movie hit Crazy Little Thing Called Love with co-star Mario Maurer. She has been a freelance actress since 2016.

== Early life ==
Baifern, a Thai actress of Chinese descent, was born on September 30, 1992, in Dusit, Bangkok, Thailand. She began her career in the Thai entertainment as a model for a popular brand of student shoes while she was in grade 6 of primary school. She has a younger brother named Field Jirathit.

She earned a bachelor's degree in Filmography from Srinakharinwirot University.

She rose to fame after playing 'Nam' in the hit romantic-comedy A Little Thing Called Love alongside co-star Mario Maurer.

== Personal life ==
She is close friends with Davika Hoorne because they used to be in the same agency.

In 2022, Baifern and Naphat Siangsomboon officially announced their relationship, but they broke up in July 2024.

== Filmography ==
=== Film ===
Year	Title	Role
2009	Power Kids	Tee Lor Girl Buru
2009	Miss You Again	Noon
2009	Meat Grinder	Nida
2010	Crazy Little Thing Called Love	Nam
2010	BKO: Bangkok Knockout	Bai Fern
2011	Love Summer	Kaimook
2012	Suddenly It's Magic	Sririta Taylor
2014	Still 2	Ant
2015	Cat A Wabb	Issarawalee Yawapongkul / Meyo
2015	Back to the 90's	Som
2017	The Guys	Sukun's sister
2019	Friend Zone	Gink
2020	The Con-Heartist	Ina Jitimaim
2022	Al Love You	Lana
2026	My Dearest Assassin	Lhan

=== Television series ===
Year	Title	Role	TV Network
2010	Wai Puan Guan Lah Fun	Noina	Channel 7
2010	Nak Su Phan Kao Niaw	Mali	Channel 7
2010	Look Khon	Rumthai	Channel 7
2011	Mon Ruk Mae Nam Moon	Kumlah	Channel 7
2011	Pandin Mahatsajun	Whan	Channel 7
2012	Arsoon Noy Nai Takieng Kaew	Nannie	Channel 7
2013	Look Mai Lark See	Sutapan	Channel 7
2014	Khun Pee Tee Ruk	Nammon	Channel 7
2016	Banlang Hong	Miss Chou / Jomkwan	Channel 7
2017	Club Friday The Series 8: True Love or Sympathy	Eye	GMM 25
2017	Slam Dance	Fang	One 31
2017	Lhong Fai	Karnkaew Sikhanol (Karn)	GMM 25
2018	Beauty Boy The Series	Meet	Channel 3 SD
2018–2019	Yuttakarn Prab Nang Marn	Rampapat	GMM 25
2019	Secret Garden	Veena	True4U
2019	The Fallen Leaf	Nira	One 31
2019	The Sand Princess	Kodnipa / Kod	GMM 25
2019	My Dear Warrior	Sky	True4U
2021	46 Days	Sasinipha Chiawchankit (Ying Ying)	GMM 25
2022	A Tale of ylang ylang	Sroi Sabunnga	Channel 3
2022	The Curse of Saree (Sinaeha Saree)	Nuannuerkaew	One 31
2024	Beauty Newbie	Prima Paspimol	GMMTV
2024	The Lady and Her Lovers (Thong Pra Kai Saed)	Thong Prakai / Thong Dee	One 31
2024	Thicha	Ouyi / Thicha	One 31
2026	Empress of Flames	Ananthip	Netflix

=== MC ===
Online

- 2021: FERNZONE EP.1 On Air YouTube: FERNZONE Channel

=== Music video appearances ===
Year	Title	Performer(s)
2004	"Num Lai (Saliva)"	Silly Fools
2006	"Rueang Thammada (Ordinary Story)"	James Ruangsak
2006	"Rao Rak Mae (We Love Mom)"	RS artists
2006	"14 Eek Krung (14 Again)"	Sek Loso
2009	"Jeb Hua Jai (Heartache)"	Sek Loso
2009	"Pleng Nee (This Song)"	Singto Saharat
2017	"Jeep…(May I ?)"	Namm Ronnadet
2018	"Kit Teung Jung (Ma Ha Noi) [I Really Miss You (Come See Me)]"	Oat Pramote
2019	"Sexy Sexy"	Lipta feat. OG-ANIC & Nino
2019	"Rao (Us)"	Cocktail
2021	"แป๊บ(Please)"	Urboytj
2021	"Chin-Up"	Boyd Kosiyabong
2021	"Kob Kandee Sak True (คบกันดีสักทรูู)"	WANYAi x Stamp with Vachirawit Chivaaree

=== Advertising ===
Year	Thai title	Title	Notes	With
2018	เครื่องปรับอากาศ Carrier Thailand			Thanapob Leeratanakachorn; Aisara Kitnitchee
2019	Purra Vitamin Water			
2019	Ingon			
2019	Onitsuka Tiger Thailand			
2019	Amado Colligi Colagen			
2020	เนสกาแฟ	NESCAFE		Jirayu Tangsrisuk
2020	SENKA by Shiseido เซนกะ ออลเคลียร์วอเทอร์ ไมเซลล่า เฟรช 230 มล.			
2020	Roju Kiss			
2020	Percy Eyewear			
2021	นมเปรี้ยวไอวี่	Ivy Uht Drinking Yoghurt.		
2021	เครื่องสำอาง Rexona			
2021	เครื่องปรับอากาศ Carrier Thailand			Thanapob Leeratanakachorn
2021	ยาสีฟัน ดอกบัวคู่ สูตรเอเวอร์เฟรช			
2021	ชุดชั้นใน ซาบีน่า	Sabina		
2021	Lazada Free Shipping ลาซาด้าส่งฟรีทุกวัน ทั่วไทย ได้ทุกคน			
2021	CLEAR อัลตร้าซีโร่			
2021	กาแฟปรุงสำเร็จรูปผสมกาแฟอาราบิก้าคั่วบดละเอียด ตรา เนสกาแฟ เบลนด์ แอนด์ บรู สูตรน้ำตาลน้อย	NESCAFE Blend Brew LESS SUGAR		

== Awards and nominations ==
Name of the award ceremony, year presented, award category, nominee(s) of the award, and the result of the nomination
Award ceremony	Year	Category	Nominee(s)/work(s)	Result	Ref.
Bangkok Critics Assembly Awards	2011	Best Actress	Crazy Little Thing Called Love	Nominated	
Bangkok Critics Assembly Awards	2016	Best Actress	Cat a Wabb	Nominated	
Bangkok Critics Assembly Awards	2020	Best Actress	Friend Zone	Nominated	
Bangkok Critics Assembly Awards	2021	Best Actress	The Con-Heartist	Won	
Bioscope Awards	2016	Performance of the Year	Cat a Wabb, Back to the 90's	Won	
Chalermthai Awards	2011	Best Actress in a Leading Role	Crazy Little Thing Called Love	Won	
ContentAsia Awards	2022	Best Female Lead in a TV Programme	A Tale of Ylang Ylang	Won	
D Online Awards	2021	Popular Female Lead	The Con-Heartist	Nominated	
Daradaily the Great Awards	2011	Best Actress – Film	Crazy Little Thing Called Love	Nominated	
Daradaily the Great Awards	2011	Best Female Rising Star	Look Khon	Nominated	
Daradaily the Great Awards	2016	Best Actress – Film	Back to the 90's	Nominated	
Daradaily the Great Awards	2018	Best Actress – Drama	Lhong Fai	Nominated	
Dara Inside Awards	2018	Breakthrough Actress	Lhong Fai	Won	
Golden Bell Awards	2011	Person of the Year – Actress	Pimchanok Luevisadpaibul	Won	
Golden Kinnaree Awards	2025	Best Actress	The Lady and Her Lovers	Won	
GQ Men of the Year	2019	Woman of the Year	Pimchanok Luevisadpaibul	Won	
Great Stars Social Awards	2019	Best Female Star of the Year	Pimchanok Luevisadpaibul	Won	
HOWE Awards	2018	Shining Actress	Lhong Fai	Won	
HOWE Awards	2023	Diva Award	Pimchanok Luevisadpaibul	Won	
HOWE Awards	2025	Best Actress	The Lady and Her Lovers, Thicha	Won	
iQIYI iJOY	2024	iQIYI Top Performance	The Lady and Her Lovers	Won	
iQIYI Screaming Night	2024	Asia Pacific Audience Favorite Actor	Pimchanok Luevisadpaibul	Won	
Joox Thailand Music Awards	2020	Thailand's Female Sweetheart	Pimchanok Luevisadpaibul	Won	
Kazz Awards	2011	Top Actress Award	Crazy Little Thing Called Love	Nominated	
Kazz Awards	2012	Top Actress Award	Arsoon Noy Nai Takieng Kaew	Won	
Kazz Awards	2017	Best Chemistry of the Year (with Davika Hoorne)	Pimchanok Luevisadpaibul	Nominated	
Kazz Awards	2017	Popular Vote – Female	Pimchanok Luevisadpaibul	Nominated	
Kazz Awards	2018	Rising Actress Award	Lhong Fai	Nominated	
Kazz Awards	2019	Top Actress Award	Yuttakarn Prab Nang Marn	Won	
Kazz Awards	2019	Top Girl of the Year	Pimchanok Luevisadpaibul	Won	
Kazz Awards	2020	Top Actress Award	The Fallen Leaf	Nominated	
Kazz Awards	2020	The Best Scene	The Fallen Leaf	Nominated	
Kazz Awards	2020	Popular Vote	Pimchanok Luevisadpaibul	Nominated	
Kazz Awards	2021	Best Actress	The Con-Heartist	Nominated	
Kazz Awards	2022	Superstar Award – Female	Pimchanok Luevisadpaibul	Won	
Kazz Awards	2022	Best Actress	46 Days	Nominated	
Kom Chad Luek Awards	2011	Best Actress – Film	Crazy Little Thing Called Love	Nominated	
Kom Chad Luek Awards	2014	Popular Vote – Actress	Look Mai Lark See	Nominated	
Kom Chad Luek Awards	2016	Best Actress – Film	Cat a Wabb	Nominated	
Kom Chad Luek Awards	2020	Best Actress – TV	The Fallen Leaf	Nominated	
Kom Chad Luek Awards	2020	Popular Vote – Actress	The Fallen Leaf	Nominated	
Kom Chad Luek Awards	2021	Best Actress – Film	The Con-Heartist	Nominated	
Kom Chad Luek Awards	2021	Popular Vote – Actress	The Con-Heartist	Nominated	
Kom Chad Luek Awards	2022	Popular Vote – Actress	46 Days	Won	
Kom Chad Luek Awards	2023	Best Actress – TV	A Tale of Ylang Ylang	Nominated	
Kom Chad Luek Awards	2023	Popular Vote – Couple (with Naphat Siangsomboon)	A Tale of Ylang Ylang	Nominated	
Kom Chad Luek Awards	2024	Popular Vote – Actress	Pimchanok Luevisadpaibul	Nominated	
Kom Chad Luek Awards	2025	Best Actress – TV	Thicha	Nominated	
Line TV Awards	2020	Best Dramatic Scene	The Fallen Leaf	Nominated	
Line TV Awards	2020	Best Kiss Scene (with Worrawech Danuwong)	The Sand Princess	Nominated	
Madame Mount Awards	2025	Charming Girl	Pimchanok Luevisadpaibul	Won	
Maya Awards	2021	Charming Girl	Pimchanok Luevisadpaibul	Nominated	
Maya Awards	2022	Charming Girl	Pimchanok Luevisadpaibul	Nominated	
Mthai Top-Talk Awards	2018	Top Talk-About Actress	Lhong Fai	Won	
Nataraj Awards	2018	Best Actress	Lhong Fai	Nominated	
Nataraj Awards	2018	Breakthrough Actress	Lhong Fai	Won	
Nataraj Awards	2020	Best Actress	The Fallen Leaf	Won	
Nataraj Awards	2023	Best Actress	The Curse of Saree	Nominated	
Nataraj Awards	2025	Best Actress in Short Form Series – less than 13 episodes	Thicha	Won	
Nataraj Awards	2025	Best Actress in Long Form Series – more than 13 episodes	The Lady and Her Lovers	Won	
Nine Entertain Awards	2018	Actress of the Year	Lhong Fai	Nominated	
Nine Entertain Awards	2023	Actress of the Year	A Tale of Ylang Ylang, The Curse of Saree	Nominated	
Nine Entertain Awards	2025	Actress of the Year	The Lady and Her Lovers, Thicha	Nominated	
OK! Awards	2018	Male Heartthrob	Pimchanok Luevisadpaibul	Nominated	
OK! Beauty Choice	2017	Charming Babe	Pimchanok Luevisadpaibul	Won	
Siam Dara Star Awards	2011	Best Actress – Film	Crazy Little Thing Called Love	Nominated	
Siam Dara Star Awards	2011	Rising Actress Award	Crazy Little Thing Called Love	Nominated	
Siam Dara Star Awards	2018	Best Villain Character	Lhong Fai	Nominated	
Siamrath Awards	2023	Popular Actress	A Tale of Ylang Ylang	Won	
Srinakharinwirot University	2014	Outstanding Student Award	Pimchanok Luevisadpaibul	Won	
Starpics Thai Films Awards	2011	Best Actress	Crazy Little Thing Called Love	Nominated	
Starpics Thai Films Awards	2016	Best Actress	Cat a Wabb	Nominated	
Starpics Thai Films Awards	2020	Best Actress	Friend Zone	Nominated	
Starpics Thai Films Awards	2021	Best Actress	The Con-Heartist	Nominated	
Star's Light Awards	2018	Popular Actress Award	Lhong Fai	Won	
Thailand Headlines Person of the Year	2019	Culture & Entertainment – Actress	Pimchanok Luevisadpaibul	Won	
Thailand Headlines Person of the Year	2024	Most Popular Thai Star	Pimchanok Luevisadpaibul	Won	
Thailand National Film Association Awards	2011	Best Actress	Crazy Little Thing Called Love	Nominated	
Thailand National Film Association Awards	2016	Best Actress	Back to the 90's	Nominated	
Thailand National Film Association Awards	2021	Best Actress	Friend Zone	Nominated	
Thailand Social Awards	2020	Best Entertainment On Social Media – Actress	The Fallen Leaf, Friend Zone	Nominated	
Thailand Social Awards	2022	Best Entertainment Performance on Social Media – Actress	46 Days	Won	
Thai Film Director Awards	2016	Best Actress	Back to the 90's	Nominated	
Thai Film Director Awards	2020	Best Actress	Friend Zone	Nominated	
Thai Film Director Awards	2021	Best Actress	The Con-Heartist	Nominated	
Thai Film Director Awards	2021	Best Ensemble Cast	The Con-Heartist	Won	
Top Awards	2011	Best Rising Actress (Film)	Crazy Little Thing Called Love	Won	
TV Gold Awards	2020	Best Actress	The Fallen Leaf	Nominated	
TV Gold Awards	2023	Best Actress	A Tale of Ylang Ylang	Won	
TV Gold Awards	2025	Best Actress	The Lady and Her Lovers	Nominated	
TV Pool Stars Party Awards	2022	Most Popular Female Superstar	Pimchanok Luevisadpaibul	Won	
Weibo Cultural Communication Night	2026	Outstanding Figure for Southeast Asian Film and Television	Pimchanok Luevisadpaibul	Won	
Weibo Cultural Exchange Night	2025	Most Influential Overseas Actress	Pimchanok Luevisadpaibul	Won	
Weibo Night Awards	2025	Shining Actor of the Year	Pimchanok Luevisadpaibul	Won	
Zoomdara Awards	2019	Zoom Female Lead	The Fallen Leaf	Won	
Zoomdara Awards	2020	Zoomdara of the Year	Pimchanok Luevisadpaibul	Nominated	
Zoomdara Awards	2022	Zoom Female Lead	46 Days	Nominated	
Zoomdara Awards	2025	Zoom Female Lead	The Lady and Her Lovers, Thicha	Won	
