= The Last Duel (Thai TV Series) =

- หงสาวดี
- Genre: Historical drama; Romance; Action
- Written by: Sirilaks Srisukon
- Directed by: Pha-oon Chandrasiri
- Starring: Tre Porapat Srikajorndecha; Nine Naphat Siangsomboon; Nok Chatchai Plengpanich; Chai Chartayodom Hiranyasthiti; Poh Natthawut Skidjai; Aom Phiyada Chutharatkul; Vill Wannarot Sonthichai; Thisa Varitthisa Limthammahisorn; Inn Jakkrasin Atsavatanachai; Obey Punnavich Sirikiatvanit
- Country of origin: Thailand
- Original language: Thai
- No. of episodes: 10

Original release
- Network: One31
- Release: March 16 – April 14, 2026

The Last Duel (Thai: หงสาวดี) is a Thai historical drama television series produced by OneD Originals and broadcast on One31. Starring Porapat Srikajorndecha (Tre) and Naphat Siangsomboon (Nine), the series aired from 16 March to 14 April 2026. The story is inspired by historical events involving the Ayutthaya Kingdom and the Taungoo Kingdom during the 16th century.

== Synopsis ==
The series follows the relationship between Prince Nares and Mingyi Swa, who grew up together in Hongsawadee after Nares was sent to the Burmese royal court as a child. Despite their close bond, political tensions and military conflicts between their kingdoms gradually place them on opposing sides.

As time passes, their friendship develops into a rivalry that culminates in one of the most significant confrontations in regional history. The series explores themes of loyalty, duty, honour, sacrifice, and the consequences of war.

== Cast ==
=== Main cast ===
- Porapat Srikajorndecha (Tre) as Nares
- Naphat Siangsomboon (Nine) as Mingyi Swa / Maha Uparaja
- Chatchai Plengpanich (Nok) as Bayinnaung
- Chartayodom Hiranyasthiti (Chai) as Nanda Bayin
- Natthawut Skidjai (Poh) as Maha Thammaracha
- Phiyada Chutharatkul (Aom) as Wisut Kasattri
- Wannarot Sonthichai (Vill) as Suphankanlaya
- Varitthisa Limthammahisorn (Thisa) as Yaza Datu Kalaya
- Punnavich Sirikiatvanit (Obey)as Minye Kyawswa
- Nicha Piyavattananon (Phingphing) as Natshin Medaw
- Jakkrasin Atsavatanachai (Inn) as Ekathotsarot
- Chupong Changprung (Deaw) as Mahathera Khanchong
- Kittipong Pluemprida (Pu) as Phra Si Thamorat
- Khunakon Puraso (Team) as Phra Rachamanu
- Sathianpong Chomphuploy (Bee) as Phra Chaiburi
- Chananya Lertwattanamongkol (Khaimoog) as Mui
- Jirawat Vachirasarunpatra (War) as Phaya Dala
- Somjit Jongjohor as Suk
- Lerwith Sangsith (Aon) as Earl Sapphet
- Chatchawan Petchvisit (Keng) as Mangjaparo
- Phanuwat Thawinjindarat (Oh) as Phayajanto

=== Guest appearances ===
- Napatsawan Iris Wilms as Min A Htwe
- Ek Wichai Jongprasitporn as Phraya Kian
- Puma Pupapop Komolchote as Sangkhathat
- Neng Sarun Naraprasertkul as Natshinnaung
- Gift Wattana Kumthorntip as Mahinthrathirat
- Captain Poothanate Hongmanop as Phra Chao Satomangjo

== Production ==
The series was announced by One31 as part of its 2026 programming lineup. The screenplay was written by Sirilaks Srisukon and directed by Pha-oon Chandrasiri.

In April 2026, the production became the subject of online discussion following allegations of conceptual similarities to the comic work Ayothaya E Yawadee. One31 subsequently released an official statement regarding the development of the series and stated that the project was based on interpretations of widely known historical events.

== Broadcast ==
The series premiered on One31 on 16 March 2026 and was simultaneously made available on the streaming platform oneD. It consisted of ten episodes broadcast in prime time.
