= Same Same but Different =

2009 film by Detlev Buck

- Directed by: Detlev Buck
- Written by: Ruth Thoma; Michael Ostrowski; Detlev Buck
- Produced by: Claus Boje
- Starring: David Kross; Apinya Sakuljaroensuk; Stefan Konarske; Michael Ostrowski; Wanda Badwall
- Music by: Konstantin Gropper
- Distributed by: Delphi Filmverleih
- Release dates: 13 August 2009 (Locarno); 21 January 2010 (Germany)
- Running time: 106 minutes
- Country: Germany
- Language: German

Same Same but Different is a 2009 German drama film directed by Detlev Buck. The script follows Benjamin Prüfer's 2006 autobiographical magazine article, later published as a novel in 2007. Starring David Kross and Apinya Sakuljaroensuk.

The title of Same Same but Different is indeed an Asian-English phrase, mainly used in Thailand, although the film is set in Cambodia.

The film first premiered at the 62nd Locarno International Film Festival on 13 August 2009.

== Plot ==
Benjamin (David Kross), a German high school student, is a backpacker on his first major tour. In a nightclub in Phnom Penh, he meets a young local girl, Sreykeo (played by Apinya Sakuljaroensuk), and rapidly falls in love with her. Ben opts for this love, even though Sreykeo turns out to be HIV positive and seems to be a prostitute. It is based on the true story of Sreykeo Sorvan and Benjamin Prüfer.

== Cast ==
- David Kross as Ben
- Apinya Sakuljaroensuk as Sreykeo
- Wanda Badwal as Lilli
- Stefan Konarske as Ed
- Jens Harzer as Henry
- Anne Müller as Claudia
- Michael Ostrowski as Alex
- Marie Jung as Regula
- Lucile Charlemagne as Marie
- Julia Primus as Vanessa
- Constanze Becker as Sibylle
- Olli Dittrich as Ben's father
- Gilla Cremer as Ben's mother
- Em Boun Nat as Sreykeo's father
- Ok Sokha as Sreykeo's mother
- Anatole Taubman as the hotel manager

== Award ==
Same Same but Different was shown at the 62nd Locarno International Film Festival on 13 August 2009; and entered in the festival competition, the "Variety Piazza Grande Award". This award is conferred by critics from the American entertainment magazine Variety to films that it considers have artistic qualities and international evaluation opportunities.
