= Jason Young (actor) =

Thai actor and singer

- Born: Jason Young; Bangkok, Thailand
- Education: Columbia College Hollywood
- Occupations: Actor; singer
- Height: 1.83 m (6 ft 0 in)

Jason Young (Thai: เจสัน ยัง) is a Thai actor and singer. Young graduated from Pathum Kongka School in Bangkok and Columbia College Hollywood, majoring in film and television program, in Los Angeles. He is of Australian and Thai heritage.

Young was nominated for Best Leading Actor for his role in the film F. Hilaire in 2015 Bangkok Critics Assembly Awards. He was also nominated for Best Villain for his role in TV Series Muk Liam Petch in 2012 Siamdara Star Awards.

As of 2022, he applied for and became a Senior Protective Services Officer with Queensland Police in Australia.

== Works ==
=== Music ===
- Young Jason (1995)
- Jason Youngster (1996)
- C.J.L. friends club (1997)
- Be My Guest Album Most Wanted (2010)

=== Movie ===
- Mr Boon-Um (1996)
- 666 Death Happens (2009)
- F. Hilaire (2015)
- Friend Zone (2019)

=== TV Series ===
- The Crown Princess (2018)
- Miss Culinary (2019)

=== Stage play ===
- Bunlang Mek the musical
- The Last Day Show: Will I Survive?
- Return of The Last Day Show: Will I Survive
