= Friend Zone (2019 film) =

2019 Thai romantic comedy film

- Theatrical release poster
- Directed by: Chayanop Boonprakob
- Written by: Chayanop Boonprakob; Thodsapon Thiptinnakorn; Pattaranat Phiboonsawat
- Produced by: Jira Maligool; Vanridee Pongsittisak
- Starring: Naphat Siangsomboon; Pimchanok Luevisadpaibul; Jason Young
- Cinematography: Kittiwat Semarat
- Edited by: Panayu Kunvanlee
- Music by: Hualampong Riddim
- Production company: Jor Kwang Films
- Distributed by: GDH 559
- Release date: February 14, 2019 (Thailand)
- Running time: 119 minutes
- Country: Thailand
- Language: Thai
- Box office: ฿220 million

Friend Zone (Thai: ระวัง..สิ้นสุดทางเพื่อน, RTGS: Rawang.. Sinsud Thang Phuean; lit. 'Beware..The End of Friendship') is a 2019 Thai romantic comedy film written and directed by Chayanop Boonprakob, starring Naphat Siangsomboon (Nine) and Pimchanok Luevisadpaibul (Baifern). The film follows two close friends, Palm and Gink, whose decade-long relationship shifts when Palm attempts to cross the boundary of friendship to pursue his romantic feelings.

Produced by Jor Kwang Films and distributed by GDH 559, it was released on February 14, 2019, in Thai theaters.

== Plot ==
For over a decade, flight attendant Palm (Naphat Siangsomboon) has been secretly in love with his best friend, Gink (Pimchanok Luevisadpaibul). While attending the wedding of an acquaintance, Ju (Panisara Arayaskul), Palm joins a support group of fellow men who are similarly stuck in the "friend zone" with their respective best friends, where he vents about his own history with Gink.

Palm and Gink have been inseparable since high school, continuously confiding in each other. During their school years, Gink discovered that her father was having an affair in Chiang Mai. Palm accompanied and comforted a devastated Gink throughout the journey, leading him to confess his love to her. Overwhelmed by her family situation, Gink rejected his confession, causing a temporary rift between them. By the end of high school, Gink reconciled with Palm under the condition that they remain strictly platonically friends, later introducing him to her new boyfriend.

Although Gink moved on to other relationships, Palm remained unable to get over her, engaging in casual relationships with various women to cope with his heartbreak. However, Palm consistently abandoned his dates whenever Gink called for assistance. In 2017, Palm gained renewed hope when Gink broke up with her cheating boyfriend and vowed to remain single. However, in 2018, Gink entered a new relationship with Ted (Jason Young), a music producer, leaving Palm devastated. Determined to escape the friend zone, Palm begins aggressively pursuing Gink.

Soon after, Gink suspects Ted of infidelity while collaborating on a multilingual version of his song "Kid Mak," which requires Ted to travel across Southeast Asia for recording sessions. Palm accompanies Gink as she secretly follows Ted to monitor his behavior. In Malaysia, Gink discovers that Ted has brought another woman to his hotel room. Devastated by the confirmation of Ted's infidelity, Gink goes on a trip to Krabi with Palm to heal.

In Krabi, Palm secretly purchases condoms in hopes of escalating their relationship, but Gink discovers them. This sparks a heated argument, prompting Gink to leave. However, she later returns and promises Palm that she will break up with Ted to be with him, requesting that they travel to see the Northern Lights together. Palm agrees and tells her that he will wait for her in Mandalay once she finalizes her breakup with Ted. When Gink meets Palm in Mandalay, she backtracks on her promise, insisting they remain friends out of fear that a romantic breakup would permanently ruin their longtime bond. Heartbroken, Palm leaves Gink in Mandalay, flies back to Thailand alone, and cuts off all contact with her.

Back at Ju's wedding in the present day, the support group sympathizes with Palm's story. When Gink approaches the group, they urge her to let Palm go so he can move on. However, Gink reveals that she no longer wants to remain just friends. Noticing she is not wearing the ring he previously gave her, Palm finds the missing ring she misplaced at the venue, slips it back onto her finger, and proposes to her. Ending their decade-long friend zone, Gink happily accepts his proposal as they begin a new chapter of their lives together.

== Cast ==
=== Main ===
- Naphat Siangsomboon (Nine) as Palm

A flight attendant who has been secretly in love with his best friend Gink for ten years.

- Pimchanok Luevisadpaibul (Baifern) as Gink

Palm's close friend who keeps him firmly in the friend zone while managing a troubled relationship of her own.

- Jason Young as Ted

Gink's boyfriend, a music producer whose frequent work travels lead Gink to suspect him of infidelity.

=== Supporting ===
Members of the "Friend Zone Gang" who share Palm's fate:

- Benjamin Joseph Varney as Friend Zone Buddy 1

A biracial young man who has harbored unrequited feelings for his best friend for one year while she is in another relationship.

- Nathasit Kotimanuswanich (Best) as Friend Zone Buddy 2

A bespectacled young man who has been in love with his best friend for three years while she remains unable to get over her ex.

- Sukhapat Lohwacharin (Suam) as Friend Zone Buddy 3

An East Asian-looking young man who has loved his best friend for five years but cannot pursue him because he wants to focus on his master's and doctoral studies.

=== Guest ===
- Thanaporn Wagprayoon (Parn) as herself
- Panisara Arayaskul (Opal) as P'Ju
- Natara Nopparatayapon (Ice) as Friend Zone Buddy 3's best friend
- Ploynira Hiruntaveesin (Kapook) as Palm's flight attendant friend
- Paweesuda Janket (May) as Pupee
- Oraphan Arjsamat (Bew) as bride
- Jira Maligool as a tour bus tourist
- Pacharaporn Hitanant as administrative teacher
- Namewee as hotel bellboy

The following Asian singers make guest appearances performing the film's multilingual theme song, "Kid Mak":

- Namfon Inthavong (Laos)
- Claudia Barretto (Philippines)
- Chi Pu (Vietnam)
- Meng Jia (China)
- Joyce Chu (Malaysia)
- Laura Mam (Cambodia)
- Audrey Tapiheru (Indonesia)
- Cantika Abigail (Indonesia)
- Phyu Phyu Kyaw Thein (Myanmar)

== Production ==
=== Development ===
In 2015, GDH 559 producers Jira Maligool and Vanridee Pongsittisak launched a screenwriting internship program. Director Chayanop Boonprakob applied for the program and subsequently submitted a short story about the "friend zone" as an assignment, drawing inspiration from his personal experiences. Impressed by the material, Jira encouraged Chayanop to develop the concept into a feature-length film.

=== Screenplay ===
Chayanop initially collaborated with rookie screenwriter Pattaranat Phiboonsawat to expand his internship assignment into a full script. Two months into development, they were joined by screenwriter Thodsapon Thiptinnakorn, who had previously co-written Chayanop's prior directorial works such as SuckSeed (2011) and May Who? (2015). This project marked the third feature film collaboration between Chayanop and Thodsapon. The writing team spent over a year polishing the screenplay before it was finalized.

== Soundtracks ==
- "คิดมาก (Kid Mak)" by Palmy, rearranged into a multilingual version featuring nine Asian singers
- "เพื่อน" by Polycat
- "มาเลเซีย" by Pae Arak
- "ปล่อย" by Pop Pongkool
- "คุกเข่า" by Cocktail
- "วันหนึ่งฉันเดินเข้าป่า (Into the Woods)" by Max Jenmana
- "รักไม่ยอมเปลี่ยนแปลง" by Tik Shiro
- "คนมีเสน่ห์" by Pang Nakarin
- "ไม่รัก..ไม่ต้อง" by New&Jiew
- "เลือกได้ไหม" by Zaza

== Release ==
On August 27, 2018, GDH generated early interest for the film through a mock "leaked" Facebook Live broadcast from a company meeting room. The stream, intentionally titled with the scrambled keystroke gibberish "ดพรำก ผนื" (which types out "Friend Zone" on an English keyboard layout), showed executives discussing the studio's upcoming slate following the box office success of Vithaya Thongyuyong's Brother of the Year (2018). The broadcast teased Parkpoom Wongpoom's Homestay (2018) and Chayanop Boonprakob's then-untitled project, while also introducing lead actors Naphat Siangsomboon and Pimchanok Luevisadpaibul before the broadcast was abruptly cut off. The project was officially unveiled under the working title Friend Zone on October 12, 2018, during a joint press conference between GDH and Nadao Bangkok titled "GDH X Nadao Party" at Paragon Cineplex.

On January 10, 2019, GDH launched the film's official promotional campaign and released its theatrical poster, which featured the Thai tagline "ระวัง.. สิ้นสุดทางเพื่อน" (Rawang.. Sinsud Thang Phuean; literally "Beware.. The End of Friendship"). The title was a clever play on words referencing the well-known moving walkway warning announcement at Suvarnabhumi Airport, "ระวัง สิ้นสุดทางเลื่อน" (Rawang Sinsud Thang Luean; "Beware, the end of the moving walkway"), subverting the final word to match the film's romantic theme. The film held its official premiere on January 16, 2019, at the Quartier Gallery in the EmQuartier shopping mall, where supporting cast member Jason Young was introduced. The film was subsequently released nationwide in Thailand on Valentine's Day, February 14, 2019.

== Before Friend Zone ==
Before Friend Zone
- Theatrical release poster
- Directed by: Thitipong Kerdtongtawee
- Produced by: Chotirat Wareerattanarot
- Starring: Sukhapat Lohwacharin; Arak Amornsupasiri; Wasu Pluemsakulthai; Natara Nopparatayapon
- Cinematography: Pasit Tandaechanurat
- Edited by: Asamaporn Samakphan
- Production companies: Hello Filmmaker iSM BANGKOK
- Distributed by: GDH 559
- Release date: March 14, 2019 (Cinema)
- Running time: 7 minutes
- Country: Thailand
- Language: Thai

Before Friend Zone is a short film directed by Thitipong Kerdtongtawee, starring Sukhapat Lohwacharin (Suam) and Arak Amornsupasiri (Pae). It takes place before the events of the main film and tells the story of a young man who attempts to confess his love to another male friend via a hard drive. The film was screened in participating cinemas from March 14, 2019, and was released online on March 21, 2019.

The actors participating in this film are:

- Sukhapat Lohwacharin (Suam) as Suam
- Arak Amornsupasiri (Pae) as Pae
- Wasu Pluemsakulthai (Lex) as Pang
- Natara Nopparatayapon (Ice) as Ice
