= 46 Days (TV series) =

2021 Thai television series

- Official series poster
- 46วัน ฉันจะพังงานวิวาห์ (Thai)
- Genre: Drama; Romantic comedy
- Directed by: Ekkasit Trakulkasemsuk
- Starring: Pimchanok Luevisadpaibul; Chanon Santinatornkul; Jumpol Adulkittiporn; Lapassalan Jiravechsoontornkul
- Country of origin: Thailand
- Original language: Thai
- No. of episodes: 18

Production
- Executive producer: Sataporn Panichraksapong
- Running time: 48 minutes
- Production companies: GMMTV; Keng Kwang Kang Waisai

Original release
- Network: GMM25; AIS Play
- Release: 7 July – 2 September 2021

46 Days (Thai: 46วัน ฉันจะพังงานวิวาห์; 46 Wan Chan Ja Phang Ngan Wiwah, lit. 46 Days, I Will Crash the Wedding) is a 2021 Thai television series starring Pimchanok Luevisadpaibul (Baifern), Chanon Santinatornkul (Nonkul), Jumpol Adulkittiporn (Off) and Lapassalan Jiravechsoontornkul (Mild). Directed by Koo Ekkasit Trakulkasemsuk and produced by GMMTV together with Keng Kwang Kang Waisai, this series aired on GMM25 and AIS Play from July 7, 2021, to September 2, 2021.

== Synopsis ==
Ying Ying (Pimchanok Luevisadpaibul), a not-so-famous net idol, is about to go bankrupt after her followers caught her lying when she promoted a product, so she has to survive in whatever way she could amid the economic slump. Aside from helping herself survive, she needs to help Noina (Lapassalan Jiravechsoontornkul), who is both her childhood best friend and her own debt creditor. At one time, a fortune teller tells Noina that she will get married this year. So she looks around, and the only person who fits the bill is Doctor Korn (Chanon Santinatornkul), who has a handsome face and a successful career.

The only problem is Doctor Korn will have to marry his famous high-society girlfriend, Wisa (Phatchatorn Thanawat), a princess-like celebrity, in just 46 days. However, Ying Ying and Noina discover that the bride-to-be is hiding certain secrets. The mission to save a good man from an evil woman and end up with an angel has begun. If the mission succeeds, Ying Ying will be completely free of all her debts to Noina. However, there isn't much time left, and there's an obstacle too like Doctor Pat (Jumpol Adulkittiporn), Doctor Korn's close friend, who follows them everywhere with suspicion.

== Cast and characters ==
=== Main ===
- Pimchanok Luevisadpaibul (Baifern) as Ying Ying
- Chanon Santinatornkul (Nonkul) as Doctor Korn
- Lapassalan Jiravechsoontornkul (Mild) as Noina
- Jumpol Adulkittiporn (Off) as Doctor Pat

=== Supporting ===
- Phatchatorn Thanawat (Ployphach) as Wisa

Doctor Korn's girlfriend who's also a famous celebrity.

- Jennie Panhan as Pang

Ying Ying's half-sister who has her own salon business.

- Chatchawit Techarukpong (Victor) as Warut
- Chinnarat Siriphongchawalit (Mike) as Yoo

Wisa's personal assistant who has worked with Wisa for a long time.

- Rutricha Phapakithi (Ciize) as Cin

Wisa's personal assistant who's often scolded by Wisa because of her performance.

- Jaturong Mokjok as Som

Pang's father.

- Daraneenute Pasutanavin (Top) as Paew

Ying Ying and Pang's mother.

- Apinan Prasertwattanakul (M) as Anant

Ying Ying's father.

- Natthaphichamon Singkharawat (Yongyee) as Wisa's mother
- Raiwin Sirisatiensakul (Him) as Paper

=== Guest ===
- Orntara Poolsak (Looknam) as wedding organizer (Ep. 4-5)
