= The Outrage (2011 film) =

- Theatrical release poster
- Thai: U mong pa meung
- Directed by: M.L. Pundhevanop Devakula
- Starring: Mario Maurer; Ananda Everingham; Pongpat Wachirabunjong; Dom Hetrakul; Petchtai Wongkamlao
- Cinematography: Panom Promchard
- Music by: Chatchai Pongprapaphan
- Distributed by: Sahamongkol Film International
- Release date: September 11, 2011
- Running time: 108 minutes
- Country: Thailand
- Language: Thai
- Box office: $864,968

The Outrage (Thai: อุโมงค์ผาเมือง), also known as At the Gate of the Ghost, is a 2011 Thai drama movie directed by M.L. Pundhevanop Devakula. It is an adaptation of M.R. Kukrit Pramoj's play "Rashomon", which is based on the Japanese short story In a Grove by Ryūnosuke Akutagawa.

Released in Thailand on September 11, 2011, the film stars Mario Maurer, Ananda Everingham, Pongpat Wachirabunjong, Dom Hetrakul, and Petchtai Wongkamlao. It was released internationally in European and Asian countries like Russia, Lithuania, Germany, Ukraine, Poland, Malaysia, Singapore, China, Georgia, Vietnam, and Shan State.

== Plot ==
In the wake of a heated murder trial, a young monk seeks refuge from a storm in a deserted burial tunnel, where a conversation with a poor man and a beggar reveals three distinctly different versions of the events leading up to the killing.

A warlord has been murdered, and as the trial gets underway the testimonies of his wife, the bandit Singh Khan and a shaman with the power to call on the victim's spirit only serve to obscure the truth, rather than clarify it. Deeply perplexed after hearing all of the testimonies, a young monk embarks on a journey to seek his father's counsel as a storm blows in.

A nearby burial tunnel provides a place to rest until the storm has passed. In the process of seeking shelter, the monk crosses paths with a common man who also testified at the trial.

Later, the two men are joined by an elderly beggar who engages them both in a heated discussion about the trial. Throughout their conversation, the stories of the wife, the bandit, and the shaman are all recounted in great detail, revealing the personal agendas of all three.

Eventually, as the stories draw to a close and the clouds begin to clear, the troubled young monk grows increasingly perplexed by the nature of the truth—not only as it applies to the trial but also as the core of his belief system.

== Cast ==
- Mario Maurer as Monk
- Petchtai Wongkamlao as Woodcutter
- Pongpat Wachirabunjong as Undertaker
- Ananda Everingham as Warlord
- Laila Boonyasak as Warlord's Wife
- Dom Hetrakul as Thief
- Pongsiree Bunluewong as Police Inspector

== See also ==
- Rashomon, a 1950 Japanese film with the same narrative structure
