= Mario Maurer =

Thai actor (born 1988)

- มาริโอ้ เมาเร่อ
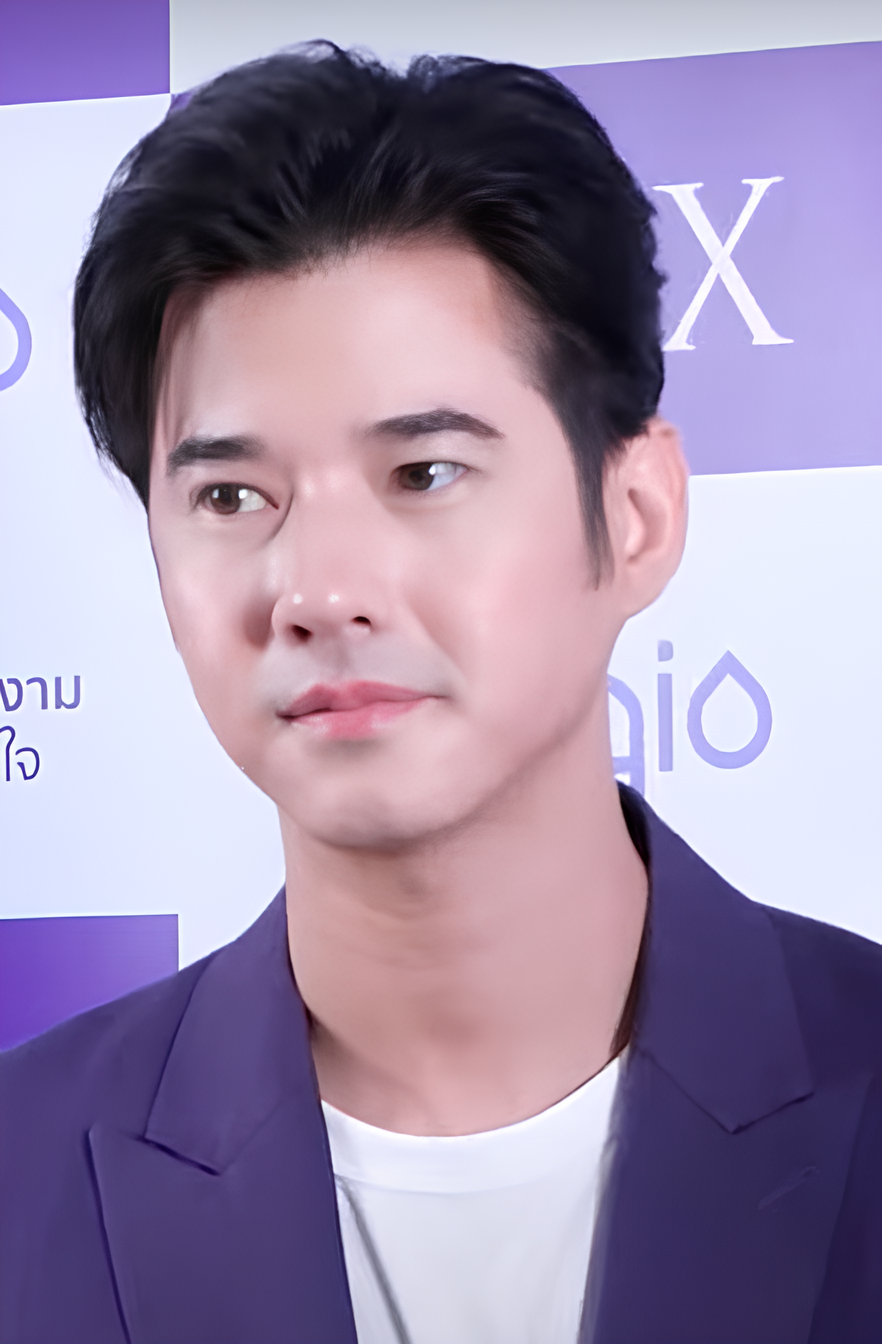
- Maurer in 2024
- Born: 4 December 1988 (age 37); Bang Rak, Bangkok, Thailand
- Other names: Nutthawuth Maurer; Nutthawuth Suwannarat
- Education: LL.B., Ramkhamhaeng University; Masters in Political Communication, Krirk University
- Occupations: Actor; singer
- Years active: 2004–present
- Height: 1.80 m (5 ft 11 in)

Signature
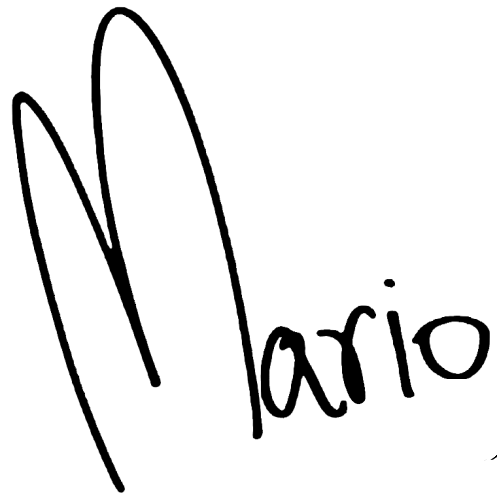

Mario Maurer (Thai: มาริโอ้ เมาเร่อ, Thai: [māːrīʔôː māw.rɤ̂ː]; German: [ˈmaːʁio ˈmaʊ̯ʁɐ]) is a Thai actor. He was in the 2007 film Love of Siam and the 2010 sleeper hit Crazy Little Thing Called Love. He was also in Thailand's highest grossing film of all time, Pee Mak alongside Davika Hoorne. He was part of a group called 4+1 Channel 3 Superstar with actors Nadech Kugimiya, Prin Suparat, Pakorn Chatborirak, and Phupoom Pongpanu.

== Early life and education ==
Maurer was born to a German father and a Thai Chinese mother. He has an older brother named Marco, who is a Thai rapper. Maurer graduated from Saint Dominic School and earned his bachelor's degree from the Faculty of Law, Ramkhamhaeng University. In 2017, he received his master's degree in Political Communication from Krirk University.

== Actor and model ==
At 16 years old, Maurer was approached at Siam Square to try out modeling. From then on, he started doing photo shoots, commercials and music videos. In 2007, he made his feature film debut in a leading role in Love of Siam, written and directed by Chukiat Sakweerakul. The role "Tong" was his first big break; it brought him many accolades and instant fame far beyond Thailand's borders. Commenting on his newfound fame, Maurer said, "I didn't want to do it, acting wasn't on my to-do list." He decided to do the movie because he trusted director Chukiat and the movie would give him many opportunities and money to help his family.

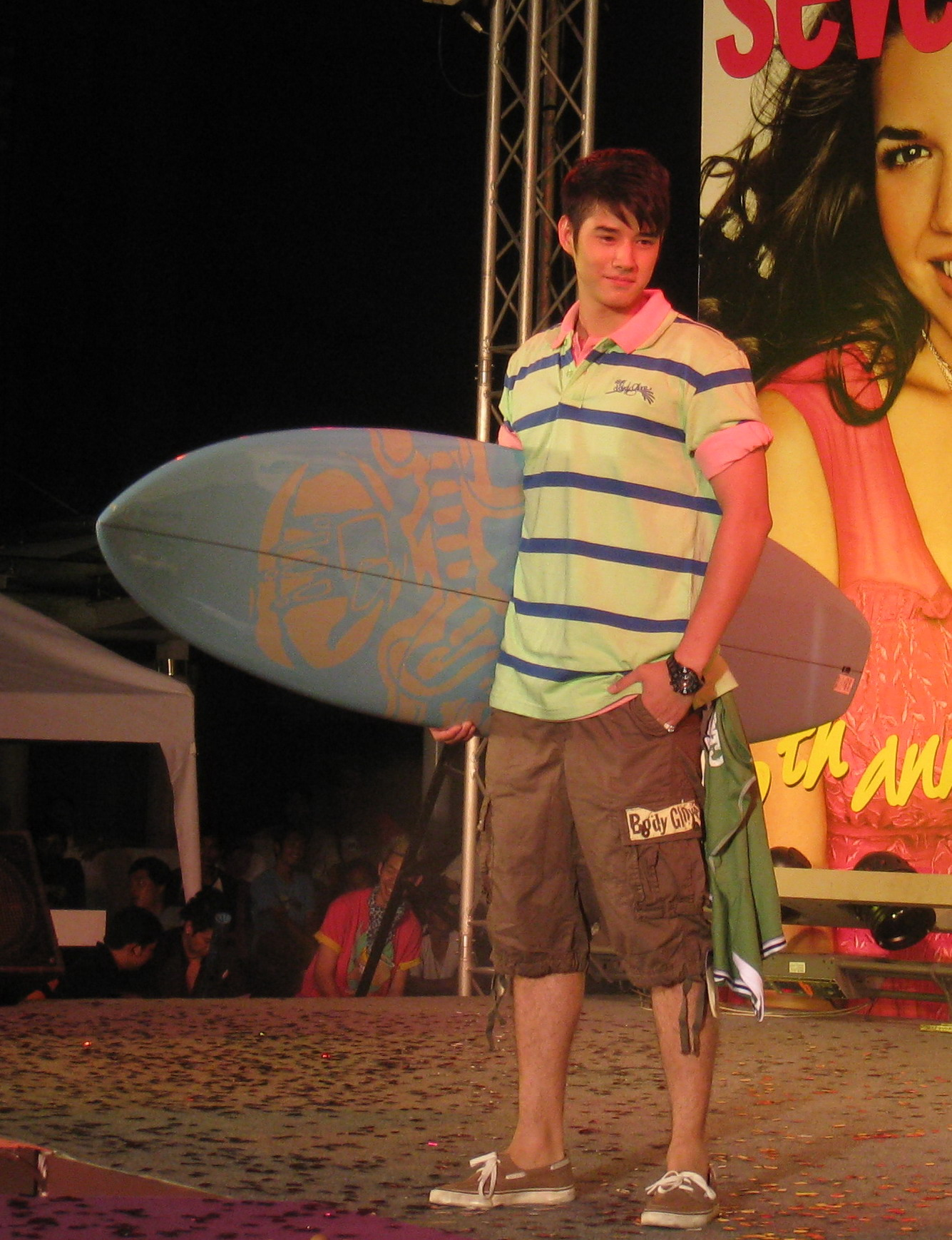
His other work as a model.

He won the Best Actor award in the Starpics Thai Films Awards, and was also nominated in the Bangkok Critics Assembly and Star Entertainment Awards.

Director Bhandit Rittakol had approached Maurer for Boonchu 9, but he was tied up with other projects. He was cast in the 2008 Chatchai Naksuriya film Friendship. The film is set around 1983. Maurer starred opposite Apinya Sakuljaroensuk, as a 12th grade student. That same year, he appeared in a segment of the four-story anthology 4 Romance, (segment "Joob" or Kiss) directed by Rashane Limtrakul. Maurer's projects after 2008 included a comedy-horror film written and directed by Yuthlert Sippapak, and the 2009 film Rahtree Reborn, in which he starred opposite Chermarn Boonyasak.

Maurer gained popularity after he starred in the 2010 film First Love and Thailand's highest grossing film of all time, Pee Mak.

== Other work ==
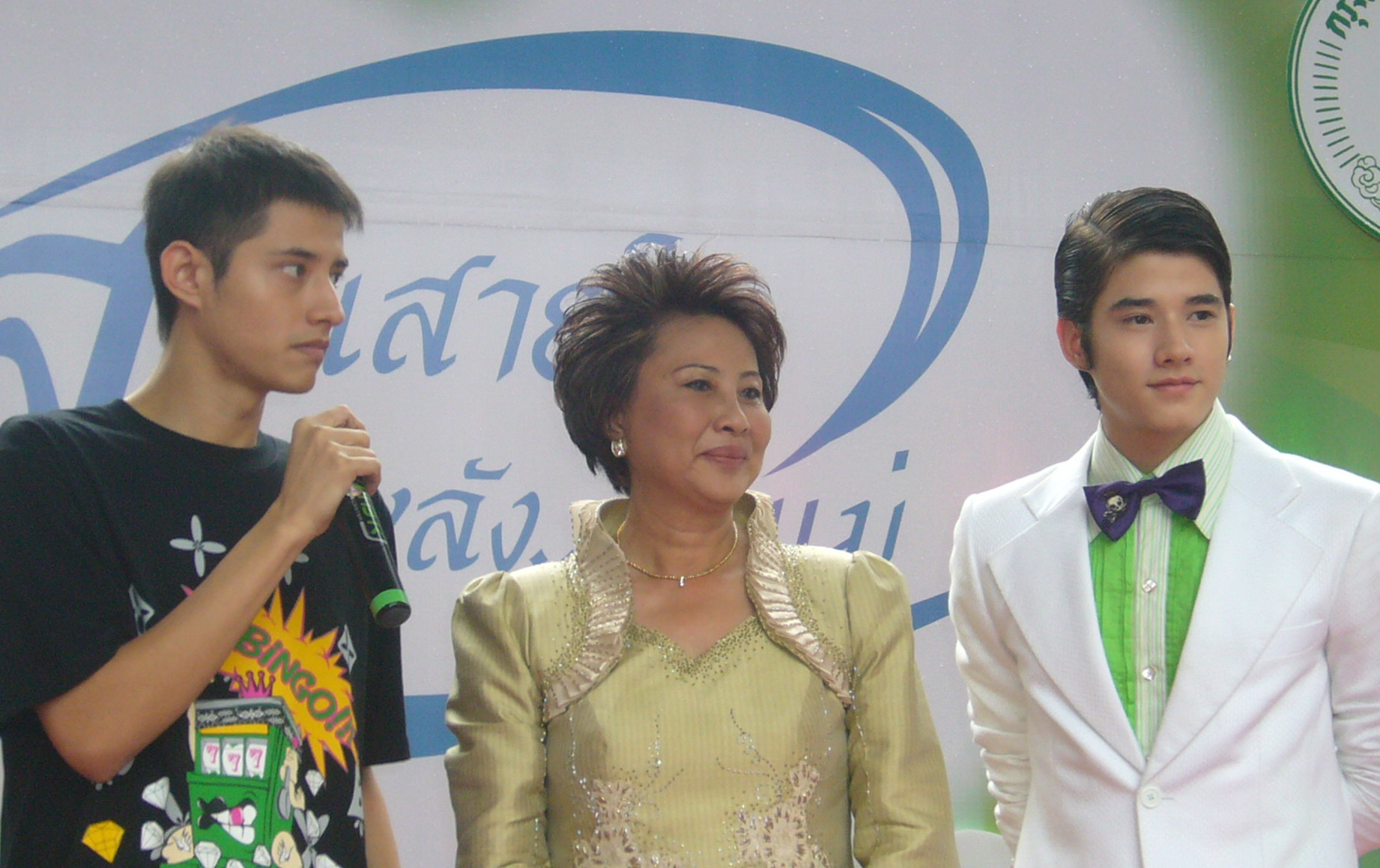
Maurer (right) with his brother and his mother.

Maurer teamed up with his older brother Marco in the hip hop duo "PsyCho & Lil'Mario". They released their debut PsyCho & Lil'Mario: Dem Crazy Boyz on 31 October 2007. Maurer worked as a hypeman in this album. He would later on describe it as "just for fun. I know myself – I'm not a singer. That's not my dream."

Maurer participated in endorsements for the first time for Exit Rollon and other popular brands such as The Pizza Company, Sugus, and Foremost. He was also the presenter for Honda Jazz, and was in the cloud 9 commercial by Unilever company. He also did endorsements for Pepsi, Dutchmill, and Sony Ericsson. In July 2011, he signed an endorsement contract for the Philippine clothing brand Penshoppe, following the unexpected popularity from his film Crazy Little Thing Called Love shown on the ABS-CBN network. He also signed a movie contract with Star Cinema, a Philippine film production company. He was paired with Filipina film and television actress Erich Gonzales in the film released in 2012, Suddenly It's Magic. On 28 October 2011, Maurer had a press and fan conference at the Philippine International Convention Center with thousands of fans in attendance, as a part of his official launch as a Penshoppe endorser. On 29 October, he hit the runway at the Philippine Fashion Week held at the SMX Convention Center. On 3 August 2013, Maurer returned to the Philippines to promote his movie Pee Mak and had a fan conference at two venues, SM North EDSA and SM Mall of Asia the following day with Baifern Pimchanok, as part of Pimchanok's official launch as Penshoppe endorser. Thousands of fans were in attendance in continuing support for both stars and their 2010 hit movie First Love.

== Personal life ==
Maurer's personal interests include skateboarding, hip hop, and driving cars. He is also a naturist. Although he is of German descent, he doesn't speak German. He understands basic words and phrases in Mandarin as he studied the language while he was in high school. His father Roland Maurer died of a diabetes-related heart attack on 27 June 2008. He has a very close relationship with his brother Marco, a hip-hop artist and actor.

== Filmography ==
=== Films ===
Year	Title	Role	Notes	With
2007	The Love of Siam	Tong	Main role	Witwisit Hiranyawongkul
2008	Friendship	Singha	Main role	Apinya Sakuljaroensuk
2008	4 Romance	Mee / Beaver	Main role	Apissara Tudti
2009	Rahtree Reborn	Rung	Main role	Chermarn Boonyasak
2009	Rahtree Revenge	Rung	Main role	Chermarn Boonyasak
2010	Saranae Siblor	Ake	Main role	Araya A. Hargate
2010	A Little Thing Called Love	Shone	Main role	Pimchanok Luevisadpaibul
2010	Eternity	Young buddhist monk	Cameo appearance	None
2010	The Dog	Art	Main role	None
2010	Saranae Hen Phi	Doh	Main role	Patcharapa Chaichua
2011	The Outrage	Monk	Main role	None
2011	Bangkok Assassins	Na	Main role	Jarinya Sirimongkolsakul
2012	Friends Never Die	Gun	Main role	Monchanok Saengchaipiangpen
2012	Rak Sud Teen	Aek	Main role	Amena Gul
2012	Love On That Day	Martin	Chinese film	Ye Qing
2012	Jan Dara: The Beginning	Jan Dara	Main role	None
2012	Thailand (Long Distance Relationship)	Himself	Short film cameo	None
2012	Suddenly It's Magic	Marcus Hanson	Philippine film	Erich Gonzales
2013	Pee Mak	Mak	Main role	Davika Hoorne
2013	Jan Dara: The Finale	Jan Dara	Main role	None
2015	Prisana	Mario	Short film	Davika Hoorne
2016	Take Me Home	Tan	Main role	Wannarot Sonthichai
2017	Saranae Love You	Himself	Main role	Seo Ji-yeon
2019	Khun Phaen Begins	Keaw	Main role	None
2020	Low Season	Phut	Main role	Ploypailin Thangprabhaporn
2021	77 Heartwarmings	Marvel	Chinese film	None
2022	AI Love You	Bobby	Main role	Pimchanok Luevisadpaibul
2022	Six Characters	Khamron Singha	Main role	None
2023	Khun Pan 3	Suea Mahesuan	Main role	None
2024	Rider	Nat	Main role	Sarocha Chankimha
2025	4 Tigers	Suea Mahesuan	Main role	Weir Sukollawat Kanarot
2026	Dawn of Soengsang		Main role	Natsha Taechamongkalapiwat

=== Television ===
Year	Title	Role	With	Network
2010	Tai Fah Tawan Diew	Minho	Varitthisa Limthammahisorn	Modernine TV
2011	Plerng Torranong	Plerngrit "Plerng"	Natapohn Tameeruks	Channel 3
2012	Rak Kerd Nai Talad Sode	Tong	Rasri Balenciaga Chirathiwat	Channel 3
2012	Gandang Gabi Vice	Himself	Kakai Bautista, Erich Gonzales	ABS-CBN
2013	Madam Dun	Neks	Laila Boonyasak	Channel 3
2014	Roy Ruk Hak Liam Tawan	Onizuka Takeshi (Tawan)	Natapohn Tameeruks	Channel 3
2014	Roy Fun Tawan Duerd	Onizuka Takeshi (Tawan)	Natapohn Tameeruks	Channel 3
2015	Song Huajai Nee Puea Tur	Tharatorn / Warong	Chalida Vijitvongthong	Channel 3
2017	Bunlang Dok Mai	Anawin	Jarinporn Joonkiat	Channel 3
2017	Game of Thrones Season 7	Jon Snow (Voice only, Thai dub)	None	HBO Asia
2017	Buang Banjathorn	Laoperng	Davika Hoorne	Channel 3
2019	Thong Ake Mor Yah Tah Chaloang	Thong Ake	Kimberley Anne Woltemas	Channel 3
2022	Keu Ter (Bad Romeo)	Kaokla	Urassaya Sperbund	Channel 3
2023	Mor Luang	Thong-on	Kimberley Anne Woltemas	Channel 3
2024	Kissed by the Rain	"Mai" Mawin	Natapohn Tameeruks	
2027	The Good Life Little Bad Boy	TBA	Ruby Lin	TVBS
TBA	The World Figure Skating on Ice	TBA	Ivy Shao	CTS
TBA	Same Name For What	TBA	Ice Paris Intarakomalyasut	Channel 3
TBA	Bad Dog	Kaoaka	Supassara Thanachat	Channel 3

=== Music video appearances ===
- 2007 Pak Di Khi Ngao Aotae Chai – Mila (ปากดี ขี้เหงา เอาแต่ใจ - จามิล่า พันธ์พินิจ) (RS/YouTube:welovekamikaze) with

== Discography ==
=== Soundtrack appearances ===
- Movies: Pee Mak (พี่มาก..พระโขนง)
  - Songs: (ขอมือเธอหน่อย(cover version) ร้องร่วมกับ ณัฏฐพงษ์ ชาติพงศ์, พงศธร จงวิลาส, อัฒรุต คงราศรี และ กันตพัฒน์ สีดา) On Air YouTube:GTHchannel
- Dramas: Bunlang Dok Mai (บัลลังก์ดอกไม้)
  - Songs: (กลัวจะเผลอรักเธอไปสักวัน ร้องร่วมกับ จรินทร์พร จุนเกียรติ) On Air YouTube:Ch3Thailand Music
  - Songs: (ขอบคุณ (Acoustic Version)) On Air YouTube:Ch3Thailand Music
- Dramas: Bad Romeo (คือเธอ)
  - Songs: Touch Touch - (ศดานันท์ บาเล็นซิเอก้า (Feat.)) On Air YouTube:Ch3Thailand Music
  - Dramas Frozen Heart (邵雨薇)
  - Songs Xiang Lim Mao (和道妹) Ivy Shao SETTV

== Awards and nominations ==
Name of the award ceremony, year presented, category, nominee of the award, and the result of the nomination
Award ceremony	Year	Category	Nominee / Work	Result	Ref.
Asia Model Awards	2017	Asia Special Award – Model	Mario Maurer	Won	
Asian Academy Creative Awards	2018	Best Comedy Performance	Saranae Love You	Nominated	
Asian Academy Creative Awards	2019	Best Comedy Performance	Thong EK: The Herbal Master	Nominated	
Asian Film Awards	2008	Best Supporting Actor	Love of Siam	Nominated	
Asian Film Awards	2012	Best Supporting Actor	The Outrage	Nominated	
Bangkok Critics Assembly Awards	2008	Best Actor	Love of Siam	Nominated	
Bangkok Critics Assembly Awards	2014	Best Actor	Pee Mak	Nominated	
Bangkok Critics Assembly Awards	2017	Best Actor	Take Me Home	Nominated	
Bangkok Critics Assembly Awards	2021	Best Actor	Low Season	Won	
Busan International Film Festival	2022	Marie Claire Asia Star Awards: Face of Asia	Mario Maurer	Won	
Daradaily the Great Awards	2011	Best Actor – Film	First Love	Nominated	
Daradaily the Great Awards	2013	Best Actor – Film	Jan Dara: The Beginning	Nominated	
Daradaily the Great Awards	2014	Best Actor – Film	Pee Mak	Won	
Daradaily the Great Awards	2015	Best Actor – TV	Roy Ruk Hak Liam Tawan	Nominated	
Daradaily the Great Awards	2016	Cool Guy of the Year	Mario Maurer	Nominated	
Daradaily the Great Awards	2017	Best Actor – Film	Take Me Home	Nominated	
Kom Chad Luek Awards	2012	Best Actor – TV	Plerng Toranong	Nominated	
Kom Chad Luek Awards	2012	Popular Vote – Actor	Mario Maurer	Nominated	
Kom Chad Luek Awards	2013	Best Actor – TV	Rak Kerd Nai Talad Sod	Nominated	
Kom Chad Luek Awards	2017	Best Actor – Film	Take Me Home	Nominated	
Kom Chad Luek Awards	2021	Best Actor – Film	Low Season	Nominated	
Kom Chad Luek Awards	2023	Best Actor – TV	Bad Romeo	Nominated	
Nataraj Awards	2023	Best Actor	Bad Romeo	Nominated	
Nine Entertain Awards	2012	Best Actor	Plerng Torranong, Bangkok Assassins, The Outrage	Nominated	
Nine Entertain Awards	2013	Best Actor	Friends Never Die, Rak Sud Teen, Rak Kerd Nai Talad Sode, Jan Dara: The Beginning	Nominated	
Nine Entertain Awards	2014	Best Actor	Pee Mak, Madam Dun, Jan Dara: The Finale	Won	
Nine Entertain Awards	2017	Public Favorite	Mario Maurer	Nominated	
Nine Entertain Awards	2023	Best Actor	Al Love You, Bad Romeo, Six Characters	Won	
Nine Entertain Awards	2024	Best Actor	Khun Phan 3, Mor Luang	Nominated	
OK! Awards	2008	Rising Star	Love of Siam	Won	
OK! Awards	2013	Spotlight	Pee Mak	Won	
OK! Awards	2013	Female Heartthrob	Mario Maurer	Nominated	
OK! Awards	2014	Female Heartthrob	Mario Maurer	Nominated	
OK! Awards	2016	Female Heartthrob	Mario Maurer	Nominated	
Saraswati Awards	2018	Popular Male Star	Mario Maurer	Nominated	
Seesan Awards	2014	Popular Male Lead	Roy Ruk Hak Liam Tawan	Won	
Seesan Awards	2019	Best Couple with Kimberley Anne Woltemas	Thong EK: The Herbal Master	Won	
Seventeen Choice Awards	2008	Seventeen Choice Hottie Male	Mario Maurer	Won	
Seventeen Choice Awards	2011	Seventeen Choice Hottie Male	Mario Maurer	Nominated	
Seventeen Choice Awards	2012	Seventeen Choice Actor	Mario Maurer	Won	
Seventeen Choice Awards	2013	Hot Guy of the Year	Mario Maurer	Won	
Seventeen Choice Awards	2014	Seventeen Choice Actor	Mario Maurer	Won	
Siam Dara Star Awards	2008	Male Rising Star	Love of Siam	Won	
Siam Dara Star Awards	2013	Best Actor in a Motion Picture	Pee Mak	Won	
Siam Dara Star Awards	2013	Popular Male Star	Mario Maurer	Nominated	
Siam Dara Star Awards	2014	Popular Male Star	Mario Maurer	Nominated	
Siam Dara Star Awards	2015	Popular Male Star	Mario Maurer	Nominated	
Siam Dara Star Awards	2016	Popular Male Star	Mario Maurer	Nominated	
Starpics Thai Films Awards	2008	Best Actor	Love of Siam	Won	
Starpics Thai Films Awards	2014	Best Actor	Pee Mak	Nominated	
Starpics Thai Films Awards	2017	Best Actor	Take Me Home	Nominated	
Starpics Thai Films Awards	2021	Best Actor	Low Season	Won	
T-Pageant	2008	Hot Man of the Year	Mario Maurer	Won	
Thailand National Film Association Awards	2023	Best Actor	Six Characters	Nominated	
Top Awards	2009	Best New Actor – Film	Friendship	Won	
Top Awards	2010	Best Actor – Film	Rahtree Reborn	Nominated	
Top Awards	2011	Best Actor – Film	First Love	Won	
Top Awards	2013	Best Actor – Film	Jan Dara: The Beginning	Nominated	
TV Gold Awards	2013	Best Actor	Rak Kerd Nai Talad Sod	Nominated	
TV Gold Awards	2014	Best Actor	Madam Dun	Nominated	
TV Gold Awards	2020	Best Actor	Thong EK: The Herbal Master	Won	
TV Gold Awards	2023	Best Actor	Bad Romeo	Won	
TV Gold Awards	2024	Best Actor	Mor Luang	Nominated	
TV Gold Awards	2025	Best Actor	Kissed by the Rain	Nominated	
White TV Awards	2021	Best Actor	Thong EK: The Herbal Master	Won	

=== Listicles ===
Name of publisher, year listed, name of listicle, and placement
Publisher	Year	Listicle	Placement	Ref.
Forbes	2020	100 Digital Stars (Asia)	Placed	
GQ Thailand	2017	GQ Men of the Year – Male Lead	Placed	
Men's Health Thailand	2015	Men's Health Best Seller	Placed	
Numéro Thailand	2017	Best Beauty Brands Products 2017–18 – Male Best Skin	Placed	
