= I Carried You Home =

- Film poster
- Thai: ปาดังเบซาร์
- Directed by: Tongpong Chantarangkul
- Written by: Tongpong Chantarangkul; Piyakarn Bootprasert; Pramette Chankrasae
- Produced by: Thacksakorn Pradubpongsa
- Starring: Akumsiri Suwannasuk; Apinya Sakuljaroensuk; Torpong Kul-on
- Cinematography: Pramette Chankrasae
- Music by: Buddhist Holiday
- Production company: Triton Film Production
- Release dates: January 20, 2012 (PIFF); September 20, 2012 (Thailand)
- Running time: 115 minutes
- Country: Thailand
- Languages: Thai; English; Hokkien

I Carried You Home (Thai: ปาดังเบซาร์, romanized: Padang Besar) is a Thai independent film in road movie genre released in 2012, directed by Tongpong Chantarangku.

== Plot ==
The film tells the story of two sisters who are different. The younger sister Pann to live with an aunt in Bangkok to study. One day her mother came from Padang Besar in southern Thailand for visit her, but soon her mother died suddenly while singing on stage. She shocked and she's trying to call her sister, Pinn who works in Singapore. The following day, Pinn returned to Thailand. The sisters carried their mother to hometown Padang Besar with an ambulance.

== Cast ==
- Akumsiri Suwannasuk...Pinn
- Apinya Sakuljaroensuk...Pann
- Torpong Kul-on...Ambulance driver
- Charmaine Nuengjamnong... Pinn’s Girlfriend

== Production & release ==
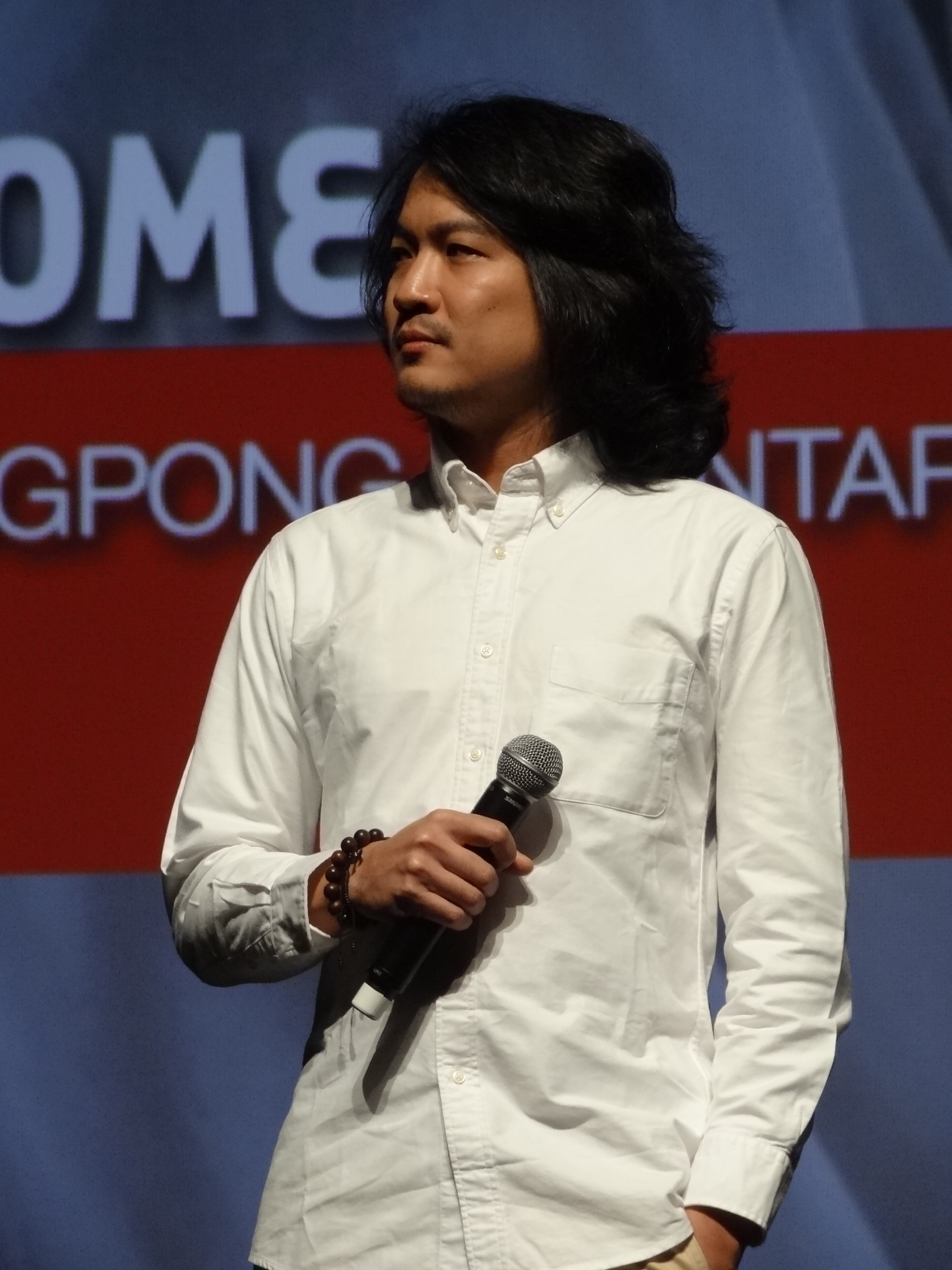
The Thai film director Tongpong Chantarangkul at the 2012 Deauville Asian Film Festival

I Carried You Home, is a Thai film that received a subsidy to develop a screenplay from the Busan International Film Festival in 2008 and one of four films selected for the 2010 Thai Film Pitching in Cannes Film Festival. In conceiving the story of the film, director Tongpong Chantarangkul took inspiration from a friend's experiences in the aftermath of his mother's death.

The film premiered on January 20, 2012 during the 9th World Film Festival of Bangkok and has been released at over 10 different film festivals around the world such as, International Film Festival Rotterdam etc.

The film received two awards from the 22nd Thailand National Film Association Awards (Suphannahong National Film Awards) in 2013, Outstanding Performance by an Actress in a Leading Role (Apinya Sakuljaroensuk) and Outstanding Achievement in Cinematography (Pramette Chankrasae).
