= Bangkok Assassins =

- Film poster
- Directed by: Yuthlert Sippapak
- Starring: Mario Maurer: Arak Amornsupasiri
- Cinematography: Tiwa Moeithaisong
- Edited by: Tawat Siripong
- Distributed by: Grindstone Entertainment Group (USA): Lionsgate Home Entertainment (USA)
- Release date: September 1, 2011
- Running time: 104 minutes
- Country: Thailand
- Language: Thai

Bangkok Assassins or Bangkok Kung Fu is a 2011 Thai action movie directed by Yuthlert Sippapak and starring Mario Maurer and Arak Amornsupasiri. It was released on September 1, 2011 and distributed by Grindstone Entertainment Group and Lionsgate Home Entertainment in the United States.

== Cast ==
- Mario Maurer as Na
- Arak Amornsupasiri as Phong
- Vitsawa Thaiyanon as Kaa
- Artikitt Prinkprom as Chi
- Jarinya Sirimongkolsakul as Kor-ya
- Mathee Singruang as White Monkey
- Manel Soler as Hitman Gangster
- Visava Thaiyanont as Ga
- Teerasak Vongcharoenthavon as Red Monkey
