= The Bride of Naga =

- Genre: Romance; Drama; Fantasy; Time travel
- Created by: Pongsakorn Jindawatana
- Written by: Pimmada Pattana-alongkorn; Pimsirin Pongwanichsuk; Jutima Yamsiri
- Directed by: Sant Srikaewlaw
- Starring: Porapat Srikajorndecha; Atsadaporn Siriwattanakul; Petch Boranin
- Composer: Achariya Dulyapaiboon
- Country of origin: Thailand
- Original language: Thai
- No. of episodes: 19

Production
- Executive producers: Takonkiet Viravan; Nipon Pewnen
- Running time: 60 minutes
- Production company: GMM Grammy

Original release
- Network: One 31
- Release: 4 September – 6 November 2023

The Bride of Naga (Thai: พนมนาคา; RTGS: Phanom Nakha) is a Thai romance drama series. First broadcast on One 31. It shows in reruns at 23:45 p.m. on Netflix.

== Synopsis ==
Asia, a pediatrician who came to treat children's snake scale disease in Phanom Nakha village. She encountered danger but was assisted by Anantachai, the Naga serpent who protected Phanom Nakha. A thousand years ago, she was Ananchalee, Anantachai's lover, but she was captured by Anekchat, Anantachai's younger brother with envy and wants to possess Ananchalee in hopes of ascending to Nagathibodi, who is the greatest among the Nagas, This jealousy brings many stories which is bound to the present life Until causing Asia to encounter strange stories, It's hard to find the answer.

== Cast ==
=== Main ===
- Porapat Srikajorndecha as Anantachai
- Atsadaporn Siriwattanakul as Asia / Ananchalee
- Petch Boranin as Anekchat
- Wittaya Teptip as Phumkhaobin / Binthurat
- Sornram Teppitak as Dr. Preeda
- Sarucha Petchroj as Sowannee
- Kulteera Yordchang as Sittha / Sareethan
- Benjasiri Wattana as Dr. Ari
- Ploypailin Limpanavatayanon as View
- Phromphiriya Thongputtaruk as Sean
- Phutharit Prombandal as Sophon
- Vorarit Fuangarome as Bakaew
- Arnuttaphol Sirichomsaeng as Akkhi
- Rong Kaomulkadee as Dee
- Boonsong Nakphoo as Kham
- Lerwith Sangsith as Yae
- Sawanee Utoomma as Buakhai
- Prissana Wongsiri as Wan
- Phanchanokchon Phansang as Wannet

=== Guest ===
- Anis Suwit as Lan
- Phollawat Manuprasert as Tan
- Khunakorn Kirdpan as Thanis
- Chananticha Chaipa as Nari

== Original soundtrack ==
- "Rak oei" (รักเอ๋ย), opening theme by Thongchai McIntyre
- "Mong chai" (มองใจ), ending theme by Saharat Thiempan
- "Mai khoei cha khit" (ไม่เคยจะคิด), theme by Marie Eugenie Le Lay
