= Apinya Sakuljaroensuk =

Thai actress (born 1990)

- อภิญญา สกุลเจริญสุข
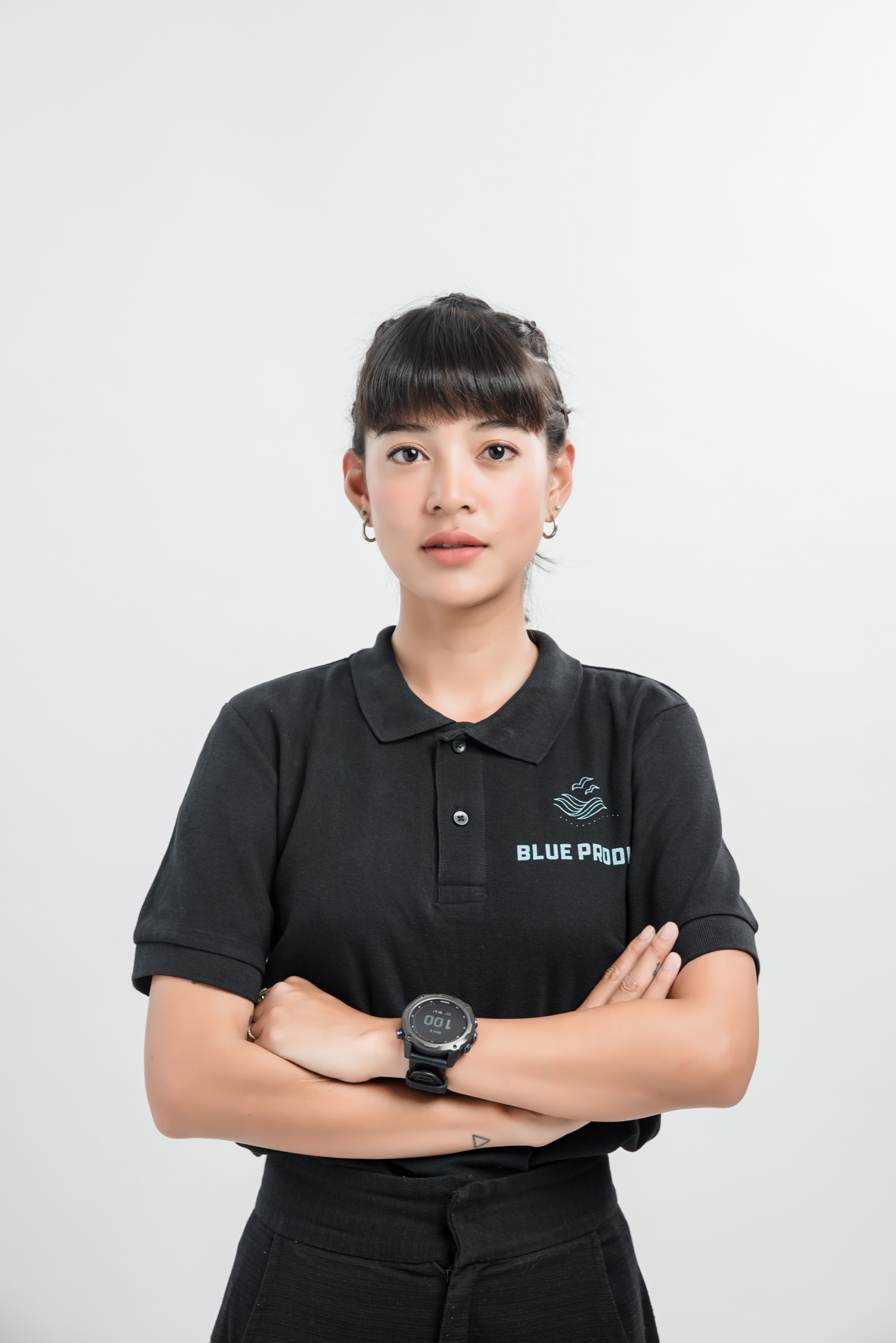
- Apinya in 2022
- Born: 1990 (age 35–36); Bangkok, Thailand
- Other name: Saiparn
- Education: Rangsit University
- Occupation: Actress
- Years active: 2007–present
- Notable work: Ploy; Same Same but Different
- Height: 163 cm (5 ft 4 in)

Signature
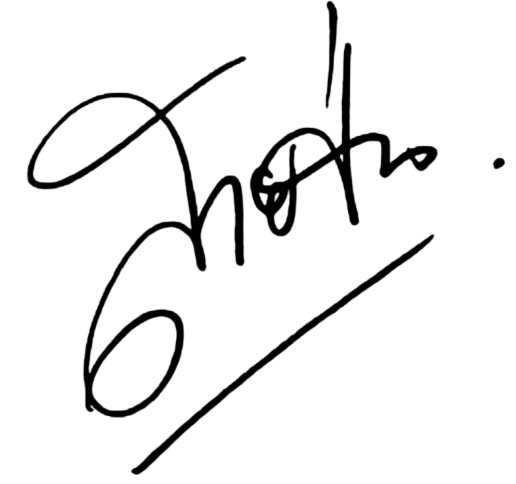

Apinya Sakuljaroensuk (Thai: อภิญญา สกุลเจริญสุข, RTGS: Aphinya Sakuncharoensuk; born 1990), also known as Saiparn, is a Thai actress.

== Early life and education ==
She graduated in a bachelor of Communication Arts from Rangsit University.

== Career ==
Apinya debuted with a role in the movie Ploy in 2007 directed by Pen-Ek Ratanaruang which premiered during the Directors' Fortnight at the 60th Cannes Film Festival. For her performance in the film, she received Best Supporting Actress awards from the Suphannahong National Film Awards and Asian Film Awards. She then starred in the horror film 4bia, the romance-drama Friendship, and the comedy Boonchoo 9.

In the Detlev Bucks-directed film Same Same but Different in 2009, she acted alongside German actor David Kross. She prepared for the role by studying English and Khmer everyday, and even dubbed the film in German. The film received a Variety Piazza Grande Award at the International Film Festival organised in Locarno.

== Filmography ==
=== Film ===
- 2007: Ploy
- 2008: 4bia
- 2008: Boonchu 9
- 2008: Friendship
- 2008: 4 Romance
- 2009: Haunting Me 2
- 2009: After School
- 2009: Same Same but Different
- 2009: 32 December Love Error
- 2010: Boonchu Jayunaijaisamer
- 2010: Sudkate Salateped
- 2010: The Intruder
- 2010: Three Dimensional
- 2011: Sammidti
- 2011: Friday Killers
- 2011: Thanks for Love Together
- 2011: Love Julinsee
- 2011: Bangkok Sweety
- 2012: Valentine Sweety
- 2012: I Carried You Home
- 2012: 3 AM
- 2012: I Miss You
- 2013: Concrete Clouds
- 2013: Project Hashima
- 2014: 1448 Love Among Us
- 2014: Fin Sugoi
- 2016: Grace
- 2016: By the Time It Gets Dark
- 2020: The Girl In The Feather Jacket
- 2022: Come Here
- 2024: The 4 Danger

=== Television ===
- Appointment With Me
- Bomb Tom Version 3: Get A Paintball Field
- Forgiveness and Girls are Free
- Sweet Oranges, Sugar, Sour
- The Role of Water
- Tadhagpleaiwand
- Strawberry Cheesecake
- Club Friday Season 6: The Fault, Dear Friend
- Club Friday the Series Continued: The Fault, Dear Friend

=== Music video appearances ===
- "Microsoft Press Club"
- "Assert"
- "I Do Not Like"
- "Roo Mai Wa Love"
- "Someone Dreamed About My Music"
- "I Fear the Film is the Fourth Crossroads"
- "I Would Also Like"
- "If I Die"
- "Know that ... Love"
- "Kiss Me Sweet Dreams"
- "Embrace the Same"
- "We are Thai"
- "Starting at the End"
- "Mai Ngao Mai Chai Mai"
- "Yeun Yan"

== Endorsements ==
- DTAC All Star
- Honda Motorcycle
- Happy Thai
- Hanami
- Pakking Bread Sticks
- Mister Donut
- Faber-Castell Color Pencils

== Accolades ==
- 2008 Thailand National Film Association Awards (Winner - Best Supporting Actress for Ploy)
- 2008 Suphannahong Award (Nominee)
- 2008 Asian Film Awards (Nominee for Best Supporting Actress)
- 2008 Star Cinema's Award (Nominee for Best Supporting Actress)
- 2008 Entertainment Critics Association Awards (Nominee)
- 2008 Chalermthai Award (Nominee for Best Supporting Actress)
- 2008 Star Entertainment Award's Content (Nominee)
- 2008 Star of Siam Star Party 2008 (Winner - Hot Young Woman)
- 2008 Seventeen Teens Choice Award (Winner - Seventeen Choice Hottie Female)
- 2010 Star of Siam Star Party (Nominee for Best Female Lead)
- 2011 StarPics Awards (Nominee for Best Actress for Behind the Scene)
