= Kanawat Chantaralawan =

Thai politician

Kanawat Chantaralawan (Thai: คณวัฒน์ จันทรลาวัณย์; born June 5, 1989 in Bangkok), popularly known as Dr. Egg (หมอเอ้ก), is a Thai politician, businessman and ophthalmologist. He is of Thai-Chinese and Malaysian descent.

Chantaralawan graduated first class honor from the 63rd class of the Faculty of Medicine, Chulalongkorn University and has worked as a physician at Queen Savang Vadhana Memorial Hospital, Si Racha, Chonburi for a period of time. Then, he is awarded a Prince Mahidol Scholar, youth program to work as a research fellow at Vaccine and Immunotherapy Center at Massachusetts General Hospital, the US. When he came back to Thailand to pursue specialty training, he chose to practice ophthalmology at King Chulalongkorn Memorial Hospital under Thai Red Cross Society.

After that, he received a scholarship from Oxford University - Oxford Thai Foundation to further study in public policy at Blavatnik School of Government, University of Oxford, UK.

Now, he is appointed as an advisor to the Deputy Minister of Ministry of Public Health and is a sitting board of the Governmental Pharmaceutical Organization (GPO), the youngest since this position has been established.
