= Porapat Srikajorndecha =

Thai actor and model

- ภรภัทร ศรีขจรเดชา
- Born: 25 January 1995 (age 31); Bangkok, Thailand
- Other name: Tre (ตรี)
- Occupation: Actor
- Years active: 2017–present
- Organization: The ONE Enterprise (2017–present)

Porapat Srikajorndecha (Thai: ภรภัทร ศรีขจรเดชา; born 25 January 1995) is a Thai actor.

== Education ==
Graduated from high school from Bangkok Christian College 160th generation. Graduated with a bachelor's degree from College of Communication Arts Rangsit University.

== Filmography ==
=== Television ===
Year	Title	Role	Notes
2016	Glasses Boy	Man	Guest role
2017	You're My Destiny	Thaya	Support role
2018	Sai Rak Sai Sawat	Pakinai Naphathorn	Main role
2018	Songkram Nak Pun	Peesaeng Musornsri	Support role
2019	Phatu Kat (Blood Brothers)	Ravit	Main Role
2019	Songkram Nak Pun Season 2	Peesaeng Musornsri	Support Role
2020	Lady Bancham	Top	Main role
2021	Pen Tor 2021	Pokpong	Guest role
2022	The Love Proposal	Time Metheephatthana	Main role
2023	The Bride of Naga	Anantachai	Main role
2024	Marital Justice	Phawin	Main role
2025	The Tipsy Mystery	Pi	Main role
2025	The Successor	Chonlathan Rapeethada	Guest role
2026	The Last Duel	Naresuan	Main role

=== Online show ===
Year	Title	Network	Notes
2022	ภารกิจชีวิตนอกจอ Mission Unscripted	One 31	
2023	Activitre (First Version)	One Connection	
2025	1 DAY 1 VLOG	One Connection	EP.14
2026	Activitre	One Connection	

== Awards ==
Year	Award	Category	Result	Nominated work
2017	Nataraja Awards 9th	Best Newcomer Actor	Nominated	You're My Destiny
2018	Dara Inside Awards	Best Newcomer Actor	Won	Sai Rak Sai Sawat
2022	Global Star Media Awards 2022	Rising Star Couple of the Year (with Nopjira Lerkkajornnamkul)	Won	The Love Proposal
2025	Nataraja Awards 16th	Best Leading Actor (Drama)	Nominated	Marital Justice
2026	FEED x KHAOSOD AWARDS 2026	Actor of the Year (Series-Drama)	Nominated	The Last Duel
