= You're My Destiny (2017 TV series) =

2017 Thai television series

- Also known as: Fated to Love You; Tur Keu Prom Likit
- Genre: Drama; Romantic comedy
- Directed by: Worawit Khuttiyayothin
- Starring: Sukrit Wisetkaew; Esther Supreeleela
- Opening theme: You're My Destiny by Sukrit Wisetkaew
- Country of origin: Thailand
- Original language: Thai
- No. of episodes: 17

Production
- Running time: 80 minutes
- Production company: GMM Grammy

Original release
- Network: GMM One
- Release: 4 September – 27 November 2017

Related
- Fated to Love You (2008); You Are My Destiny (2014)

You're My Destiny (Thai: เธอคือพรหมลิขิต) is a 2017 Thai television series starring Sukrit Wisetkaew and Esther Supreeleela. Directed by Worawit Khuttiyayothin, it is produced by GMM Grammy and aired on GMM One from 4 September until 27 November 2017. The series is based on the 2008 Taiwanese drama Fated to Love You.

== Cast ==
- Sukrit Wisetkaew as Pawüt Krisheepanine
- Esther Supreeleela as Wanida "Nid" Carreon-Krisheepanine
- Charebelle Lanlalin as Kaekai
- Duangta Toongkamanee as Phatchani Charon-Krisheepanine (Pawut's grandmother)
- Porapat Srikajorndecha as Thaya
- Suchao Pongwilai as Bacủa Krisheepanine
- Tee Doksadao as Sano Carreon
- Mayurin Pongpudpunth as Darika Charon
- Punpop Sitang as Amphai
- Sirin Kohkiat as Chun
- Wattana Kumthorntip as Apichart
- Wittaya Teptip as Jess
- Kitkasem Mcfadden as Tanawat
- Kittipong Pluempredaporn as Kim

== Ratings ==
Episode #	Original broadcast date	Rating
1	04/09/2017	1.20
2	05/09/2017	1.50
3	11/09/2017	1.50
4	12/09/2017	2.10
5	18/09/2017	2.10
6	19/09/2017	2.40
7	25/09/2017	2.60
8	26/09/2017	2.50
9	30/10/2017	3.10
10	31/10/3017	3.65
11	06/11/2017	4.03
12	07/11/2017	3.80
13	13/11/2017	3.90
14	14/11/2017	4.40
15	20/11/2017	3.80
16	21/11/2017	4.00
17	27/11/2017	4.40
	Average	3.00
