= First Love (2010 Thai film) =

- Film poster
- Directed by: Wasin Pokpong; Puttipong Pormsaka Na-Sakonnakorn
- Written by: Wasin Pokpong
- Produced by: Thanaseth Burinchotisin; Somsak Tejcharattanaprasert; Panya Nirankol; Prapas Cholsaranon
- Starring: Mario Maurer; Pimchanok Luevisadpaibul
- Cinematography: Reungwit Ramasudh
- Edited by: Pongtorn Panichchob; Sirikan Srichulabhorn
- Music by: Jakkrapat Iamnoon
- Distributed by: Sahamongkol Film International Co. Ltd. Workpoint Entertainment
- Release date: August 12, 2010
- Running time: 122 minutes
- Country: Thailand
- Language: Thai
- Box office: ฿85,037,300

First Love, also known as A Crazy Little Thing Called Love, (Thai: สิ่งเล็กเล็ก ที่เรียกว่า...รัก, Sing lek lek thi riak wa... rak, lit. "A Little Thing Called Love") is a 2010 Thai romantic comedy film and a 2011 Asian sleeper hit starring Mario Maurer and Pimchanok Luevisadpaibul. It tells the romance between seventh grade middle school and Grade 10 students.

== Plot ==
Nam is a 14-year-old middle school student who is deemed ugly. She harbors a crush on Chon, a good-looking and popular Grade 10 freshman from her school who she feels is way out of her league. She hangs out with her three best friends known as the Cheer Gang and helps her mother out in their family-owned bed and breakfast. An average student, she begins to take her studies seriously to see her father in the United States who works there as a sous-chef. She and her sister are promised a plane ticket if they ever rank first in school.

While lining up for refreshments, Nam and her friends are disturbed by two boys who rudely cut in front of them. Chon, who saw the girls being harassed, swept into the rescue and bought the beverages for Nam and her friends. On her way home, Nam learns that Chon got into a fight with the two boys and quickly rushes to the scene, only to find the situation has been dissipated. She finds a bloodied button on the floor (which she assumes is Chon's) and keeps it as a memento, calling it Mr. Button. The next day, Chon receives corporal punishment from the school superintendent for the incident. Feeling guilty, Nam approaches Chon to give him some plasters while Chon assures her that none of it was her fault. He thanks her and calls her by her name. Nam rejoices at the thought of her crush knowing her name.

Requested by her three classmates, Nam follows the advice of the guidebook called Nine Recipes of Love, which can supposedly win the affection of the man of your dreams if followed closely. Some of the methods described in the book sound weird to Nam initially, but she is willing to try all of them eventually. These include spelling Chon's name on the stars, controlling his mind, and leaving chocolates on his motorbike - all in a likely futile attempt to get noticed by him. Over the course of summer, she tries to improve her looks by wearing braces, switching from glasses to contacts, and doing all sorts of skin regiments.

At the beginning of eighth grade, Nam and her friends get into a scuffle with her schoolmate, Faye, while signing up for after-school clubs. As a consequence, Nam and her friends are barred from signing up to the popular Thai Dance Club. Instead, their English teacher, Teacher Inn, connives them into signing up for the English Drama Club, becoming part of the school production of Snow White in the upcoming school fair. Much to Nam's surprise, she finds Chon working in the production as a stage painter. Nam is picked by Teacher Inn to play the titular role since she is the best in English in her class. Nam also befriends Pin, a female upperclassman and one of Chon's close friends, who is recruited by Teacher Inn to be the makeup artist for the school play. Pin gives Nam a makeover and when she asks for his opinion, Chon only replies that he does not see any difference. During rehearsals, Chon saves Nam from falling off the stage. On the day of the play, Chon is noticeably absent and Nam assumes he went to see the Thai Dance Club. In fact, he is forced by the school superintendent to participate in a photography contest that happens to be on the same day as the school fair. Later at the backstage, she sees an apple with a bite in it left on her station with a note saying that they tasted the apple and it isn't poisoned. Nam quickly becomes a hot topic in their school when footage of her performance is shown at the school cafeteria. Meanwhile, Chon's childhood friend, Top, transfers to their school in the middle of the year. After seeing Nam in the school play, Top falls in love at first sight.

Now in Grade 9, Nam experiences a sudden rise in popularity when she is chosen, once again by Teacher Inn, as the drum major for the regional sports parade. At the same time, Chon, who is now a senior, finally manages to get into the school's soccer team after making the penalty shot. Chon gives Nam an uprooted rose bush on Valentine's Day, but her joy suddenly turns into disappointment when he tells her that it is from his friend. Later that night, she finds a note in her bag telling her to meet on the third floor of the school building. The following day, Nam goes to the meeting place where she sees Chon coming up the stairs to greet her. However, they were interrupted by Top who tells Nam that the note was his and proceeds to ask her to be his girlfriend. Shocked by this sudden proposal, Nam could not respond due to her fear of hurting Top and ruining her chances with Chon. On the other hand, he takes this as acceptance and declares her as his girlfriend. Top easily drags her into watching Chon's games and joining their field trips, which secretly only brought her closer to Chon. As Nam begins to spend more time with Chon and his friends, the Cheer Gang grows cold and distant towards her.

A candid Chon opens up to Nam about her father, telling her that he was born on the day his father missed the penalty shot, and feels that he is the reason why his father has given up soccer. During one of their friends' birthday party, Top shares the story about a promise he made with Chon, that they would never like the same girl. In the middle of the celebration, Top suddenly kisses Nam on the cheek much to her discomfort. Later that night, Nam tells Top to not involve himself with her anymore and that he did not have the right to kiss her, as she never agreed to be his girlfriend in the first place. Nam tells him that she is in love with someone else but does not tell him who. Out of distraught, Top makes Chon promise that he will not pursue Nam. Without any friend left, Nam begins to focus her time on studying for the finals.

As the end of the year approaches, Nam has a tearful reconciliation with her three best friends. In the following days, Nam learns that she ranked first in school, which means that it is only a matter of time before she is bound for the United States. The Cheer Gang gets together for one last time to help Nam finish the unwritten "tenth recipe" of the love guidebook: direct confession. With the help of her friends, Nam plucks up the courage to go to Chon and finally confesses her feelings for him. With tears of joy, Nam reveals that she has been in love with Chon for the past three years and hands him a rose trimmed from the same rose bush that he gave her on Valentine's, along with Mr. Button. However, much to her dismay, Chon reveals that he had begun dating Pin about a week ago, which leaves Nam visibly hurt and heartbroken. That night, Chon comes home to find out that he is accepted into the trainee program of the Bangkok Glass Football Club but has to leave for the camp the following morning. He goes into his room and takes out a notebook containing all of Nam's photos. It is revealed that Chon has been in love with Nam all these years and has kept a diary in hopes of revealing his true feelings to her one day. However, as it turned out, he never mustered the courage to do and the timing could not be worse. He leaves the diary in front of Nam's house before leaving for Bangkok. At the same time, Nam is shown crying in her bedroom.

Nine years later, Nam has made a name for herself as a successful fashion designer in New York. She returns to Thailand after being invited as a guest in a TV talk show. Nam talks about her career and recounts her days in her old school. As soon as the topic of her first love is brought up, she gets a surprise visit from Chon who is revealed to have given up his soccer career in order to pursue professional photography. Chon takes out Mr. Button and returns it to Nam, telling her that she has mistaken it as his. Nam asks Chon if he has been married, to which the latter replies that he has been waiting for someone to return from the United States after all these years.

== Cast ==
- Pimchanok Luevisadpaibul as Nam: A shabby and unattractive seventh grade student. Although her grades fall on average, she has notably high marks in English.
- Mario Maurer as Chon: A good-looking and popular tenth grade student. He is exceptionally good at soccer despite never playing in a competitive way.
- Sudarat Butrprom as Teacher Inn: An English teacher and the club supervisor of the school's English Drama Club.
- Acharanat Ariyaritwikol as Top: Nam's childhood friend, he is a new student who enters the school in the middle of Grade 11.
- Kachamat Pormsaka Na-Sakonnakorn as Pin, Chon's friend. She is recruited as the makeup artist for the English Drama Club's school play.
- Paweena Rojinda Ngam as Cheer
- Nisa Boonsantia as Ki
- Sasiprapha Thanuchavivat as Nim
- Tangi Namonto as Teacher Phon
- Pijitra Siriwerapan as Teacher Aorn
- Yanika Thongprayoon as Faye
- Puttipong Pormsaka Na-Sakonnakorn Wasin Pokpong as Chon's father
- Front Montgomery as Chon's mother
- Maneerat Wongjirasak as Nam's mother
- Kajathaneeya Srirotwattana as Paeng
- Natthaphat Arunsirisakul as the school superintendent

== Reception ==
In the Philippines, the movie made an impact on viewers after it was dubbed in Filipino and shown on free TV on June 5, 2011 on ABS-CBN. It dominated the daytime viewership ratings.

== Accolades ==
Year	Award	Category	Nominated work	Result
2010	Top Awards	Best Movie of the Year	First Love	Won
2010	Top Awards	Best Film Director	Puttipong Pormsaka Na-Sakonnakorn & Wasin Pokpong	Nominated
2010	Top Awards	Favorite Film Actor	Mario Maurer	Won
2010	Top Awards	Favorite Film Rising Star Female	Pimchanok Luevisadpaibul	Won
2010	Top Awards	Best Supporting Actress	Sudarat Budtporm	Won
2010	8th Starpics Thai Film Awards	Best Actress	Sudarat Budtporm	Won
2010	19th Bangkok Critics Assembly Awards	Best Supporting Actress	Sudarat Budtporm	Won
2010	19th Bangkok Critics Assembly Awards	Best-Looking Actor	Mario Maurer	Nominated
2010	Star Entertainment Awards	Best Actress	Sudarat Budtporm	Won
2010	Star Entertainment Awards	Favorite Actor	Mario Maurer	Nominated
2011	8th Kom Chad Luek Awards	Actress Excellent (Movie)	Pimchanok Luevisadpaibul	Nominated
2011	3rd Okinawa International Movie Festival	Laugh Category Uminchu Prize Grand Prix	First Love	Won
2011	Thailand Film Festival Awards	Film of the Year	First Love	Won
2011	Thailand Film Festival Awards	Actress in a Leading Role	Pimchanok Luevisadpaibul	Won
2011	Thailand Film Festival Awards	Music Field from the Motion Picture of the Year	First Love	Nominated
2011	20th Supanahongsa Awards	Best Actress	Pimchanok Luevisadpaibul	Nominated
2011	20th Supanahongsa Awards	Outstanding Music Composition Award	Ground Music	Nominated
2011	20th Supanahongsa Awards	Music Excellence Award	First Love	Nominated
2011	MThai Top Talk Awards	Top Talk-About Movie	First Love	Won
2011	MThai Top Talk Awards	Star Couple for 2011	Mario Maurer and Pimchanok Luevisadpaibul	Won
2011	21st Thailand National Film Association Awards	Best Actress	Pimchanok Luevisadpaibul	Nominated
2011	21st Thailand National Film Association Awards	Best Original Song	First Love	Nominated
2011	13th Udine Far East Film Festival	Technicolor Asia Award	First Love	Won
2011	Siam Dara Star Awards	Best Film	First Love	Nominated
2011	Siam Dara Star Awards	Best Director	Puttipong Pormsaka Na-Sakonnakorn & Wasin Pokpong	Nominated
2011	Siam Dara Star Awards	Outstanding Film Actress	Pimchanok Luevisadpaibul	Nominated
2011	Siam Dara Star Awards	Rising Star Award for Best Woman Actress	Pimchanok Luevisadpaibul	Nominated
2011	Seventeen Choice Awards	Hottest Man	Mario Maurer	Nominated

== See also ==
- A Little Thing Called First Love, a Chinese TV series based on the film.
