= GMM Bravo =

Thai television content and production subsidiary

- Company type: Content creation operating unit of GMM 25
- Industry: Television production
- Founded: 1 June 2016
- Defunct: 16 July 2021; 4 years ago
- Headquarters: Bangkok, Thailand
- Key people: Fahmai Damrongchaitham; Ekachai Uekrongtham
- Products: Television programs
- Parent: GMM Grammy

GMM Bravo (Thai: จีเอ็มเอ็ม บราโว่, also stylized as GMM BRAVO!) is a Thai television content and production subsidiary of GMM Grammy. It serves as a content creation operating unit that produces television drama series through the use of the media conglomerate's music resources for its digital television channel GMM 25.

== History ==
Established on 1 June 2016, GMM Bravo was a product of GMM 25's revamp on its programming as it aimed to increase its revenue to ฿800 million. With its creation, Fahmai Damrongchaitham was tasked to lead the subsidiary and oversee GMM Bravo's effort in producing television drama series that would appeal to audiences in the 15–34 age range.

Its pioneer project was Bangkok Love Stories, a television drama series based on GMM Grammy's popular songs such as Nakharin Kingsak's "Khon Mee Saneh" (คนมีเสน่ห์), Labanoon's "Phae Thang" (แพ้ทาง), and Chanakan Rattana-udom's "Please".

In 2018, GMM Bravo organized "BRAVO! BOYS", a search for young male talents across Thailand and its neighboring countries such as Myanmar, Vietnam, Laos and Cambodia as it expanded its content on digital platforms. Among it winners were Ekkaphon Deeboonmee Na Chumphae (Au), Nuttapong Boonyuen (Max), Thanadol Auepong (Parm), Chindanai Dechawaleekul (Hearth), Vayu Kessuvit (Few), Martin Sidel, Thanawin Teeraphosukarn (Louis) and Pawin Kulkarunyawich (Win). They were also joined by Everest Moe (Eve) from Myanmar, Jah Deth Teng Hortnarong from Cambodia and Trung Hieu Le from Vietnam.

GMM Bravo is notable for The Stranded (เคว้ง), a television series that the company has produced together with H2L Media Group in association with Netflix Studios. It was among the first two Netflix original Thai series together with Shimmers (อุบัติกาฬ).

== List of GMM Bravo productions ==
Year	Title	Episodes	Ref.
2016	Melodies of Life ตอน คนไม่มีแฟน	15	
2016	Melodies of Life ตอน ภาพลวงตา	13	
2016	Encore 100 Million Views เชือกวิเศษไตรภาค ตอน เกมกระชากรัก	5	
2016	Encore 100 Million Views ลมเปลี่ยนทิศไตรภาค ตอน Man In The Rain	4	
2016	Love Rhythms ตอน อยากจะร้องดังดัง	13	
2016	Encore 100 Million Views ลมเปลี่ยนทิศไตรภาค ตอน The Last Winter	5	
2016	Encore 100 Million Views เชือกวิเศษไตรภาค ตอน ปีนผาคว้าเลิฟ	3	
2016	Encore 100 Million Views เชือกวิเศษไตรภาค ตอน วันที่เธอหายไป	5	
2016	Encore 100 Million Views ลมเปลี่ยนทิศไตรภาค ตอน Summer Buddies	4	
2016	Melodies of Life ตอน Bad Friends เดอะซีรีส์	13	
2016	Encore 100 Million Views ภูมิแพ้กรุงเทพไตรภาค ตอน สาวน้อยอินเดอะซิตี้	5	
2016	Melodies of Life ตอน เป็นอย่างงี้ตั้งแต่เกิด	12	
2016	Encore 100 Million Views ไม่เคยไตรภาค ตอน ชายในสายหมอก	4	
2016	Love Rhythms ตอน Daddy จำเป็น	13	
2017
2017	Encore 100 Million Views ภูมิแพ้กรุงเทพไตรภาค ตอน Lost In คีรีวง	4	
2017	Encore 100 Million Views ไม่เคยไตรภาค ตอน ลืมรัก ไม่ลืมเธอ	5	
2017	Encore 100 Million Views ภูมิแพ้กรุงเทพไตรภาค ตอน ปั้นรักใหม่หัวใจดวงเดิม	5	
2017	Encore 100 Million Views ไม่เคยไตรภาค ตอน คำพูดที่หายไป	4	
2017	Bangkok Love Stories: Please	13	
2017	Bangkok Love Stories: My Weakness	13	
2017	Bangkok Love Stories: Keep Love	13	
2017	Bangkok Love Stories: Charming Person	13	
2018	Bangkok Love Stories: Innocence	13	
2018	Bangkok Love Stories: Hey You!	13	
2019	Bangkok Love Stories: Plead	13	
2019	Bangkok Love Stories: Objects of Affection	13	
2019	Miss Culinary	13	
2019	The Stranded	7	
2019	Bangkok Buddies	13	
2024	Intern In My Heart	TBA	
