= Together with Me =

2017 Thai television series

- Promotional poster
- อกหักมารักกับผม
- Genre: Romance; comedy drama; Boys' Love
- Starring: Pakorn Thanasrivanitchai; Nattapol Diloknawarit; Pimnitchakun Bumrungkit; Satida Pinsinchai; Tantimaporn Supawit; Apiwat Porsche
- Country of origin: Thailand
- Original language: Thai
- No. of seasons: 1
- No. of episodes: 13

Production
- Running time: 50 minutes
- Production company: TV Thunder

Original release
- Network: Line TV
- Release: 24 August – 5 October 2017

Related
- Bad Romance: The Series; Together with Me: The Next Chapter

Together with Me (Thai: อกหักมารักกับผม) is a 2017 Thai Boys' Love drama aired on LINE TV. It was broadcast on Wednesdays and Thursdays starting from 24 August 2017 to 5 October 2017. It consisted a total of 13 episodes with an average span of 50 minutes each. This story takes place before the events of Bad Romance: The Series. It focuses on Korn and Knock and how they met and all the obstacles they had to go through before they officially became a couple. There are three main couples in the series: Korn and Knock, Farm and Bright, Phubet and Kavitra. In early 2018 it was announced that there would be a sequel titled Together with Me: The Next Chapter which will follow Korn & Knock's relationship after Bad Romance: The Series. It premiered in 28 September 2018.

== Synopsis ==
One day at Amphawa, Knock, a young engineering student, wakes up to a shock: he is naked next to his childhood best friend, Korn, due to drunkenness and hormones. After fighting and arguing, Korn and Knock agree to keep this as a secret. Korn's other best friend, Yiwha, takes matters into her own hands, and tries to expose Knock's girlfriend, Plern Pleng. During the span of this series, Korn and Knock fight a lot, but also have a lot of sweet moments together, and in the end they both confess to each other and start dating.

== Cast and characters ==
- Nattapol Diloknawarit (Max) as Korn
- Pakorn Thanasrivanitchai (Tul) as Knock
- Pimnitchakun Bumrungkit (Maengmum) as Wanyiwha Trakarntapattawee (Yiwha)
- Satida Pinsinchai (Aim) as Plern Pleng (Pleng)
- Tantimaporn Supawit (C'game) as Farm
- Thitichaya Chiwpreecha (Olive) as Fai
- Apiwat Porsche (Porsch) as Bright
- Tripobphoom Suthaphong (Sek) as Mew
- Khamphee Noomnoi (Tem) as Phubet (Phu)
- Janistar Phomphadungcheep as Prae
- Sukonthawa Kerdnimit (Mai) as Kavitra
- Visava Thaiyanont (Tomo) as Cho

== Music ==
The series has produced three singles:

- "เข้าใจ" (lit. "Understood") by Singto Numchok (theme song).
- "ความรักที่ไม่ตั้งใจ" (lit. "Unintentional Love") by Tul Pakorn Thanasrivanitchai (Korn & Knock's theme).
- "Again" by C'game Tantimaporn Supawit (Farm & Bright's theme).

The following is a list of songs used in the series:

Title	Artist(s)	Album
"Manipulator"	David Felton, Steven Alexander Young, Sample Magic	Dubstep & Grime
"Darkened Path"	David Felton, Steven Alexander Young, Sample Magic	Dubstep & Grime
"Flights of Fancy"	Paul Reeves	Windows On Life (Original Soundtrack)
"Tequila Cooler"	Clifford Eric Haywood, Thomas Garrad-Cole	Feelgood Light Pop 3
"Too Cruel for School"	Daniel Carl Holter, Tony J. Olla, William Kyle White, Michael Robert Wisth	New Wave Indie
"Top of the World"	Rob Rewes	Acoustic Pop
"Cloud 9"	Robert White	Evolutions (Original Soundtrack)
"Thirsty Work"	Alistair Bruce Henry Friend, Ted Brett Barnes	Emotive Acoustic (Original Soundtrack)
"Unfolding Events"	Todd J. C Baker, Zac Jordan	Drama Tension Beds (Original Soundtrack)
"Respite"	Alistair Bruce Henry Friend, Ted Brett Barnes	Emotive Acoustic (Original Soundtrack)
"Towards the Sun"	Alexander Gray, Robert White	Melody Heads
"The Tiptoes Two-step"	Richard Myhill	Things People Do (Original Soundtrack)
"On My Way"	Clifford Eric Haywood	Journey Home
"Circuit Breaker"	Colin Anthony Flynn, Sample Magic, David Felton	Dirty Electro
"Early Morning"	John Christopher Williams	Pure Acoustic (Original Soundtrack)
"Towards the Stars"	Dan Cassady, Dylan Parsons	Cinematic Indie Drama (Original Soundtrack)
"The Violin Lesson"	Paul Reeves	Oddities
"Kooky Cat"	Paul Reeves	Vintage Dramedy Noir (Original Soundtrack)
"Hopes and Dreams"	Clifford Eric Haywood	Modern Solo Piano (Original Soundtrack)
"Follow That Car"	Paul Reeves	Umpteen Oddities
"A World of Wonder"	Paul Reeves	Life In Motion (Original Soundtrack)
"Feeling Mischievous"	Paul Reeves	Vintage Dramedy Noir (Original Soundtrack)
"Solos"	Sergio Gonzalez Rosas	Pop Alterlatino
"Beating Heart"	Brett Carr Boyett, Timothy Stephen Pierce	Cinematic Indie
"Electric Wonderland"	Paul J. Borg	Style And Fashion (Original Soundtrack)
"Memories in Sepia"	Michael Price	Human Stories (Original Soundtrack)
"It Could Only Be U"	Camrin Brown	Essential R&B
"Pinky Poinky"	Paul Reeves	Umpteen Oddities
"Charlotte Street Strut"	Paul Reeves	Umpteen Oddities
"Desert Wanderer"	Dan Cassady, Dylan Parsons	Cinematic Indie Drama (Original Soundtrack)
"Blood Sweat Tears"	Danny J. Grace, David S. Jackson	Anarchy
"Softly Does It"	Paul Reeves	Umpteen Oddities
"Barefoot in the Park"	Stefan Melzak	One Liners 2 (Original Soundtrack)
"Funtime Sunshine"	Rob Rewes	Indie Rock Promos
"Pictures of Summer"	Patrick Thomas Hawes	Moments In Time (Original Soundtrack)
"Hero Business"	Richard Jacques	Heroville (Original Soundtrack)
"Fond Memories"	Alexander Paul Rudd, Zach Lemmon	Life In Colour
"She's Got to Have Her Way"	Alistair Bruce Henry Friend, Ted Brett Barnes	The Skiffle Sessions
"Before Dawn"	Clifford Eric Haywood	Drama and Intrigue (Original Soundtrack)
"Chilling Walk"	Paul Reeves	Vintage Dramedy Noir (Original Soundtrack)
"Caring and Sharing"	Steve Baker	Living Life (Original Soundtrack)
"Barra grande"	Magno Vito	Na Praia
"First Person"	Clifford Eric Haywood	Modern Solo Piano (Original Soundtrack)
"Hidden in the Closet"	Paul Reeves	Vintage Dramedy Noir (Original Soundtrack)
"Enlighten"	Richard Allen Harvey	The Piano Book
"Unforgettable"	Christopher C. Porter, Richard Phillip Craker	Live Life Young
"Hometown Chicago"	Giovanni Antonio Parricelli, Stanley Ernest Sulzmann	Sixties Groove Jazz (Original Soundtrack)
"Ripples of Warm"	Robert White, Alexander Stephen Gray	Picture Friendly (Original Soundtrack)
"Easy Steps"	Paul Reeves	One Liners 2 (Original Soundtrack)
"Making Steps"	Alistair Bruce Henry Friend, Ted Brett Barnes	Acoustic & Quirky 2 (Original Soundtrack)
"Rhythm Injection"	Sandy McLelland	Motion (Original Soundtrack)
"Grinroller"	Sandy McLelland	Motion (Original Soundtrack)
"Borne on the Wind"	Cyrus Shahrad	Windows On Life (Original Soundtrack)
"What a Carry On"	Paul Reeves	Oddities
"Sprightly Sight"	Paul Reeves	Vintage Dramedy Noir (Original Soundtrack)
"Air-Flairs"	Diogo Do Santos	Trashy Electro House
"No volver"	Sergio Gonzalez Rosas	Pop Alterlatino
"Let it Rain"	Philip Hochstrate	Electro Indie Alternative
"Are U In?"	Tyler Van Den Berg	Electropop Deluxe
"Tango on the Terrace"	Paul Reeves	Quirky Vintage (Original Soundtrack)
"Love in the Air"	Frank Chacksfield	Mood For Love (Original Soundtrack)
"Hand in Hand"	Tony Osborne	Mood For Love (Original Soundtrack)
"Evening Hymn"	Patrick Thomas Hawes	Piano Moods (Original Soundtrack)
"Pressure Point"	Mike MacLennan	Epic Cinematic Trailers 2
"Time Out Times"	Clive Michael Oliver Carroll, Robert John Foster	Time Out Guitars (Original Soundtrack)
"Departure Point"	Robert White	Skyline Freeway (Original Soundtrack)
"Feeling the Heat"	Todd J. C Baker, Zac Jordan	Drama Tension Beds (Original Soundtrack)
"Sketchbook"	Clifford Eric Haywood	Modern Solo Piano (Original Soundtrack)
"Lovers Stroll"	Cy Miller	Romantic Rendezvous (Original Soundtrack)
"Methodology"	David Hodson Lowe, Will Slater	Beds And Backgrounds (Original Soundtrack)
"De punta y taco"	Javier E. Fioramonti	Matices de Tango
"Trying to Control"	David Edward Bloor, Scott James	Twisted Urban Drama
"Still"	Andrew Nicholas Love, John Paul Jones	Made In Nashville
"Head on My Pillow"	Alistair Bruce Henry Friend	Carefree Acoustic
"Truth Be Told"	Andy Clark	A Clearer Vision (Original Soundtrack)
"It's a New Day"	Andrew Nicholas Love, John Paul Jones	Made In Nashville
"U Go First"	Matthew Cang	Refresh (Original Soundtrack)
"Latin Lovers"	Bill McGuffie	Hotel Splendide (Original Soundtrack)
"Uneasy Times"	Zac Jordan	Cause for Concern (Original Soundtrack)
"Building the Future"	Brett Carr Boyett, Timothy Stephen Pierce	Cinematic Indie
"Detective Dynamite"	Veigar Margeirsson	Action Adventure Trailers (Original Soundtrack)
"Line Up Your Ducks"	Jay Price	Acoustic Carnival (Original Soundtrack)
"Strolling With Style"	Paul Reeves	Vintage Dramedy Noir (Original Soundtrack)
"Lujuria de Tango"	Paul J. Borg, Toby Baker	Style And Fashion (Original Soundtrack)
"New Road Travelled"	Alistair Bruce Henry Friend, Ted Brett Barnes	Emotive Acoustic (Original Soundtrack)
"Algún día le diré"	Enrique Carbajal, Rene Byron Brizuela	Sonido Norteño
"Hotty Chase"	Paul Reeves	Vintage Dramedy Noir (Original Soundtrack)
"Memories of You"	Ray Martin	Mood For Love (Original Soundtrack)
"Headspin"	Sandy McLelland	Motion (Original Soundtrack)
"Love Is"	Deep Sounds	Late Night Vocals
"The Right Path"	Thomas Greenberg	Age Of Innocence (Original Soundtrack)
"Carancheando"	Javier E. Fioramonti	Matices de Tango
"Waiting for You"	John Christopher Williams	Pure Acoustic (Original Soundtrack)
"Designs for Living"	Robert John Foster	Deeper Minimal (Original Soundtrack)
"Still Life"	Clifford Eric Haywood	Modern Solo Piano (Original Soundtrack)
"Ocean Blue"	Clifford Eric Haywood, Thomas Garrad-Cole	Feelgood Light Pop 2
"The Hit Man"	Johnny Bernstein	Murder Files (Original Soundtrack)
"Night Watchman"	Martin Tillmann, Tom Vedvik	Cinematic Atmospheres (Original Soundtrack)
"Imminent Danger"	Martin Tillmann, Tom Vedvik	Cinematic Atmospheres (Original Soundtrack)
"Sad Memories"	Michael Price	Human Stories (Original Soundtrack)
"Thoughts for a King"	Alistair Bruce Henry Friend, Ted Brett Barnes	Emotive Acoustic (Original Soundtrack)
"Summer Setting"	Ray Denny	Jazz After Dark (Original Soundtrack)
"Deeper Love"	Huw Williams	Deep House
"Identity Unknown"	Jay Price	The Hustle And Con (Original Soundtrack)
"Lily's Progress"	Alistair Bruce Henry Friend, Ted Brett Barnes	Emotive Acoustic (Original Soundtrack)
"Fun Stuff"	Curtis Frederick Schwartz, Yuri Goloubev, James Thomas Maddren	Groove Factory
"Golden Sands"	Tom Player	Big Chill 2 Volume 1.
"Sunday Brunch in Ireland"	Maria	Sunday Brunch Lounge, Vol. 1 (Mix of Finest Lounge, Smooth Jazz and Chill Music for Sunday Mornings)
"Enchantment"	Clifford Eric Haywood	Modern Solo Piano (Original Soundtrack)
"Rodeo Drive"	Clifford Eric Haywood, Thomas Garrad-Cole	Feelgood Light Pop 2
"A Worrying Uncertainty"	Zac Jordan	Drama Tension Beds (Original Soundtrack)
"Brief Encounter"	Clifford Eric Haywood	Piano Evolutions (Original Soundtrack)
"I Wonder"	Andy Clark	A Curious Mind (Original Soundtrack)
"Detroit Dynamite"	Jared Nathan Sweetman, Paul J. Borg	Indie Rock And Pop 2
"Full Moon Waltz"	Bill Connor	Wireless (Original Soundtrack)
"El amor de Carmelo"	Andres Emilio Mira-Olarte, Mauricio Andres Byfield-Sanchez	Gozadera Tropical
"Waiting Games"	Matthew James Robertson, Tom Howe, Mike Reed	Under Pressure (Original Soundtrack)
"The Working Man"	Laurence Love Greed, Michael Price	Human Stories (Original Soundtrack)
"Lucky Streak"	Cyril John Payne	Candy Pop (Original Soundtrack)
"Glory Be"	Matthew Cang	Refresh (Original Soundtrack)
