= Bangkok Love Stories =

Bangkok Love Stories, titled in Thailand as Bangkok รัก Stories (Bangkok Rak Stories), is a Thai television drama series produced by GMM Bravo and originally broadcast on GMM25. The series is created by Ekachai Uekrongtham, and consists of several segments, the story in each of which is based on a song owned by GMM Grammy, Bravo's parent company, set in one of Bangkok's neighbourhoods and follows a theme of young-adult relationships.

The first season of Bangkok Love Stories, consisting of four 13-episode segments, was broadcast from July 2017 to January 2018. Its second season was broadcast from November 2018 to May 2019, and was also made available internationally via Netflix.

== Seasons and segments ==
=== Season 1 ===
The first season consisted of four 13-episode segments, which were broadcast on the GMM25 channel and made available online through Line TV. The segments are:

- Please, starring Sananthachat Thanapatpisal and Sedthawut Anusit, broadcast from 15 July to 7 October 2017
- Phae Thang (แพ้ทาง), starring Monchanok Saengchaipiangpen and Isariya Patharamanop, broadcast from 16 July to 8 October 2017
- Kep Rak (เก็บรัก), starring Arak Amornsupasiri, Apinya Sakuljaroensuk, Lallalin Tejasa and Aerin Yuktadatta, broadcast from 4 November 2017 to 27 January 2018
- Khon Mi Sa-ne (คนมีเสน่ห์), starring Wanida Termthanaporn and Jespipat Tilapornputt, broadcast from 5 November 2017 to 28 January 2018

=== Season 2 ===
Following the conclusion of the first season, GMM Bravo announced a second season, also with four 13-episode segments. It continued to be broadcast on GMM25, but digital streaming switched to Netflix, through which it became internationally available.

- Innocence (ไม่เดียงสา, Mai Diang Sa), starring Nida Patcharaveerapong, Nicole Theriault and Nattapol Diloknawarit, broadcast from 14 November 2018 to 6 February 2019
- Hey You! (อ้าว เฮ้ย!, Ao Hoei!), starring Wanida Termthanaporn, Isariya Patharamanop and Nontanun Anchuleepradit, broadcast from 15 November 2018 to 7 February 2019
- Plead (เรื่องที่ขอจากฟ้า, Rueang Thi Kho Chak Fa), starring Chanon Santinatornkul, Sutatta Udomsilp and Morakot Liu, broadcast from 13 February to 8 May 2019
- Objects of Affection (สิ่งของ, Singkhong), starring Apinya Sakuljaroensuk, Kanokchat Munyadon and Seo Ji-yeon, broadcast from 14 February to 9 May 2019
