= Bangkok Buddies =

2019 Thai television series

- Thai: ใจกลางเมือง Bangkok Buddies
- Genre: Comedy; Drama
- Created by: GMM Bravo
- Directed by: Pongsathorn Thongcharoen
- Starring: Vayu Kessuvit; Ekkaphon Deeboonmee Na Chumphae; Nuttapong Boonyuen; Thanadol Auepong; Martin Sidel; Nichaphat Chatchaipholrat; Narupornkamol Chaisang; Jidapa Siribunchawan
- Country of origin: Thailand
- Original language: Thai
- No. of episodes: 13

Production
- Producer: Ekachai Uekrongtham
- Running time: 40 minutes
- Production company: Bravo Studios

Original release
- Network: GMM 25
- Release: 27 August – 19 November 2019

Bangkok Buddies (Thai: ใจกลางเมือง Bangkok Buddies) is a 2019 Thai television series starring Vayu Kessuvit (Few), Ekkaphon Deeboonmee Na Chumphae (Au), Nuttapong Boonyuen (Max), Thanadol Auepong (Parm), Martin Sidel, Nichaphat Chatchaipholrat (Pearwah), Narupornkamol Chaisang (Praew) and Jidapa Siribunchawan (Jida). Inspired by Labanoon's hit song "ใจกลางเมือง" (Jai Klang Mueng), the series' lead male actors form part of BRAVO! BOYS, a talent search conducted by GMM Bravo in 2018.

Directed by Pongsathorn Thongcharoen and produced by Ekachai Uekrongtham under Bravo Studios, it was one of the several television series for 2019 launched by GMM 25 in their "Fun Fact Stories" event last 15 January 2019. It premiered on GMM 25 on 27 August 2019, airing on Tuesdays at 21:25 ICT. The series concluded on 19 November 2019.

It is also available for streaming on Netflix.

== Synopsis ==
Living in a small wooden house in the middle of Bangkok's Sathon District, a group of young working men with different personalities and professions are about to face the realities of life as they deal with everyday issues and their pursuit of romance.

== Cast and characters ==
Below are the cast of the series:

=== Main ===
- Vayu Kessuvit (Few) as Jungo
- Ekkaphon Deeboonmee Na Chumphae (Au) as Takeshi
- Nuttapong Boonyuen (Max) as Dave
- Thanadol Auepong (Parm) as Krating
- Martin Sidel as Mikey
- Nichaphat Chatchaipholrat (Pearwah) as Vanessa
- Narupornkamol Chaisang (Praew) as Jim
- Jidapa Siribunchawan (Jida) as Ibiza

=== Supporting ===
- Janya Thanasawaangkoun (Ya) as Somsri
- Krunnapol Teansuwan (Petch) as Vanessa's father
- Phakphol Tanpanit (RoodBus)
- Jah Deth Teng Hortnarong as Jah Deth
- Everest Moe as Eve
- Trung Hieu Le as Hieu
- Pawin Kulkarunyawich (Win)

=== Guest role ===
- Warinda Damrongphol (DJ Dada)
- Isariya Patharamanop (Hunz)
- Thanachar Paosung (Net)
