= The Stranded (TV series) =

2019 Thai-language television series

- Genre: Fantasy; Drama
- Starring: Papangkorn Lerkchaleampote; Chutavuth Pattarakampol; Oabnithi Wiwattanawarang; Chayanit Chansangavej; Kittisak Patomburana; Ticha Wongthipkanon; Chaleeda Gilbert; Chanya McClory; Sinjai Plengpanich; Tanapon Sukumpantanasan; Pamiga Sooksawee; Siwat Jumlongkul; Pawin Kulkaranyawich; Tatchapol Thitiapichai
- Country of origin: Thailand
- Original language: Thai
- No. of seasons: 1
- No. of episodes: 7

Production
- Executive producers: Ekachai Uekrongtham; Gary Levinsohn; Christian Durso; Steven Sims; Billy Hines
- Running time: 40 minutes
- Production companies: Bravo Studios; H2L Media Group; Netflix Studios

Original release
- Network: Netflix
- Release: November 14, 2019

The Stranded (Thai: เคว้ง; RTGS: Khweng) is a 2019 Thai television series starring Papangkorn Lerkchaleampote, Chutawut Phatrakampol and Oabnithi Wiwattanawarang. The plot revolves around a number of teens who are stranded on an island when a tsunami hits.

Produced by GMM Grammy's Bravo Studios and H2L Media Group in association with Netflix Studios, it was released on November 14, 2019 on Netflix.

== Cast ==
=== Main ===
- Papangkorn Lerkchaleampote (Beam) as Kraam
- Chutavuth Pattarakampol (March) as Anan
- Oabnithi Wiwattanawarang (Oab) as Joey
- Chayanit Chansangavej (Pat) as May
- Kittisak Patomburana (Jack) as Ice
- Ticha Wongthipkanon as Ying
- Chaleeda Gilbert as Arisa
- Chanya McClory as Nahm
- Sinjai Plengpanich as Professor Lin
- Tanapon Sukumpantanasan (Perth) as Krit
- Pamiga Sooksawee (Pam) as Jan
- Siwat Jumlongkul (Mark) as Jack
- Pawin Kulkaranyawich (Win) as Nat
- Tatchapol Thitiapichai (Tan) as Gun

=== Guest ===
- Winai Kraibutr as Kraam's Father/Kraam's Stepfather
- Sarunyoo Wongkrachang (Tua) as Anan's Father
- Hattaya Wongkrachang (Ple) as Anan's Mother
- Sasithorn Panichnok as Kraam's Mother
- Thanchanok Jaroenput as Baby Kraam
- Teerapop Songwaj as 7 year old Kraam
- Nichaphat Chatchaipholrat (Pearwah) as Mint (Northern kids)
- Sahajak Boonthanakit as Ice's Father
- Ornanong Panyawong as May's Mother
- Naphath Vikairungroj (Na) as May's Admirer
- Khwanruedi Klamklom as Nahm's Mother
- Suphasawatt Purnaveja as Nahm's Father
- Iris Chieblam as Young Nahm
- Thanapob Leeluttanakajorn (Tor) as (Northern kids)
- Sutatta Udomsilp (PunPun) as (Northern kids)
- Teeradon Supapunpinyo (James) as (Northern kids)
- Kemisara Paladesh (Belle) as (Northern kids)
- Paris Intarakomalyasut (Ice) as (Northern kids)

== Release ==
The Stranded was released on November 14, 2019 on Netflix.

== Episodes ==
No. overall	No. in season	Title	Directed by	Written by	Original release date
1	1	"The Ruins"	Sophon Sakdahisit	Christian Durso and Sophon Sakdahisit	November 14, 2019
Privileged students party and prepare to part ways when a powerful tsunami slams into their island. Weeks later, hope of a rescue starts to slip away.
2	2	"The Return"	Sophon Sakdahisit	Christian Durso and Sophon Sakdahisit & Nataporn Rattanachaiwong	November 14, 2019
Shaken, Kraam awakens from a bizarre dream. Anan struggles to lead as the students work to retrieve the boat. Meanwhile, Arisa makes a discovery.
3	3	"The Code"	Sophon Sakdahisit	Sophon Sakdahisit and Chawanwit Imchai	November 14, 2019
Nahm questions the mysterious appearance of Professor Lin, while Arisa and Ying try to piece together the puzzle of the poem. The past haunts Ice.
4	4	"The Fall"	Sophon Sakdahisit	Sophon Sakdahisit and Kaenipa Phanakorn	November 14, 2019
Professor Lin acts strangely, and Ice seeks an exorcism. Kraam sketches May and draws her to a special spot. Arisa makes contact deep in the jungle.
5	5	"The Mutiny"	Sophon Sakdahisit	Steven Sims and Sophon Sakdahisit & Nataporn Rattanachaiwong	November 14, 2019
May thinks back on her life while Anan harbors suspicions. Lin warns of danger as the students get ready to set sail. Ying and Nahm hunt for answers.
6	6	"The Attack"	Sophon Sakdahisit	Steven Sims and Sophon Sakdahisit & Kaenipa Phanakorn	November 14, 2019
As Krit’s captivity wears on, Lin delivers a cryptic message to Kraam. May makes a life-changing discovery. The jungle's mysteries pull Arisa deeper.
7	7	"The Gate"	Sophon Sakdahisit	Christian Durso and Sophon Sakdahisit	November 14, 2019
Panic grips the students in the aftermath of the chaotic launch, and Anan takes control of the mob. Kraam must be courageous enough to face the truth
