= Top Form =

2025 Thai television series

- Genre: Boys' Love; Drama; Romance
- Based on: Dakaichi: I'm Being Harassed by the Sexiest Man of the Year by Sakurabi Hashigo
- Written by: Rungkun Soonthornleka; Phattharawadee Sriwichai
- Directed by: Wasakorn Khumklaowiriya
- Starring: Chisanupong Puangmanee; Raveewit Jirapongkanon
- Opening theme: "I'm Still In Love with You" by Jake $ing
- Country of origin: Thailand
- Original language: Thai
- No. of seasons: 1
- No. of episodes: 11

Production
- Producer: Thitirut Wannawibool
- Editors: Theerasan Petmai; Namtoey Prairung Bhandngam
- Production companies: WeTV; Tailai Entertainment

Original release
- Release: March 20 – May 15, 2025

Related
- Dakaichi: I'm Being Harassed by the Sexiest Man of the Year (2018)

Top Form (Thai: กอดกันมั้ย นายตัวท็อป) is a 2025 Thai television series starring Chisanupong Puangmanee (Smart) and Raveewit Jirapongkanon (Boom). It is adapted from the manga Dakaichi: I'm Being Harassed by the Sexiest Man of the Year (Japanese: 抱かれたい男1位に脅されています。) by Sakurabi Hashigo.

Directed by Wasakorn Khumklaowiriya and co-produced by WeTV and Tailai Entertainment, the series premiered on 20 March 2025 and concluded on 15 May 2025 after 11 episodes.

== Plot ==
Jin (Smart Chisanupong Puangmanee), a rising actor, and Akin (Boom Raveewit Jirapongkanon), five-time winner of the "Most Huggable Man" award, develop a playful rivalry as Jin's popularity grows. Their dynamic evolves from teasing competition into a passionate relationship, exploring themes of love, ambition, and the challenges of the entertainment industry.

== Cast ==
=== Main ===
- Smart Chisanupong Puangmanee (Smart) as Jin
- Boom Raveewit Jirapongkanon (Boom) as Akin Tahra

=== Supporting ===
- Pongsakorn Mettarikanon (Toey) as Jade
- Peeranat Veeranipitkul (Peanut) as Johnny
- Waratthip Kittiphaisan (Euro) as Naru
- Kannaporn Puanthong (Namwaan) as Judy

=== Guest ===
- Kongkiat Khomsiri (Khom) as Hong Tae
- Nunnicha Saehuang (Shu) as Jin's co-star (Ep. 1)
- Thanakorn Thipsuk (Lookgolf) as Mildy
- Pintira Singhaseem (Tonaoy) as Maria, Akin's grandmother
- Wacharin Anantapong (Rina) as theater producer (Ep. 6)
- Supawan Poolcharoen (Leegade) as Best, Akin's sasaeng fan (Ep. 8)
- Sornchai Chatwiriyachai (Chua) as Sigma CEO (Ep. 8–11)
- Phattharawadee Sriwichai

== Awards and nominations ==
Year	Award	Category	Result	Ref
2025	Thailand Box Office Awards	Best Adapted Series	Won	

== Controversies ==
In May 2025, a contractual dispute arose between Grand Ivory Records (GIR), the management agency of Chisanupong Paungmanee (Smart), and Headliner Thailand (HLN) together with Tailai Entertainment, which co-managed Smart and Boom during the series production.

On 12 May 2025, WeTV Thailand and Tailai issued a statement claiming that GIR had unilaterally terminated its collaboration, refusing to participate in further activities related to the “SmartBoom” pairing. GIR responded with official statements asserting that the termination was legally compliant, citing repeated contractual violations, and denied obstructing joint activities. GIR emphasized Smart's exclusive representation by Grand Ivory and criticized failures to provide access to his Chinese social media accounts (Weibo and RedNote).

On 22 June 2025, Grand Ivory announced the end of its cooperation with Headliner Thailand, confirming exclusive representation of Smart. Meanwhile, WeTV and Tailai declared suspension of support and investment in Smart, while continuing development of Top Form focusing on other cast members.

On 13 March 2026, WeTV announced a lawsuit against Smart and his agency, Grand Ivory Records, citing breach of contract.
