= Raveewit Jirapongkanon =

Thai actor (born 1991)

- รวีวิชญ์ จิระพงษ์กานนท์
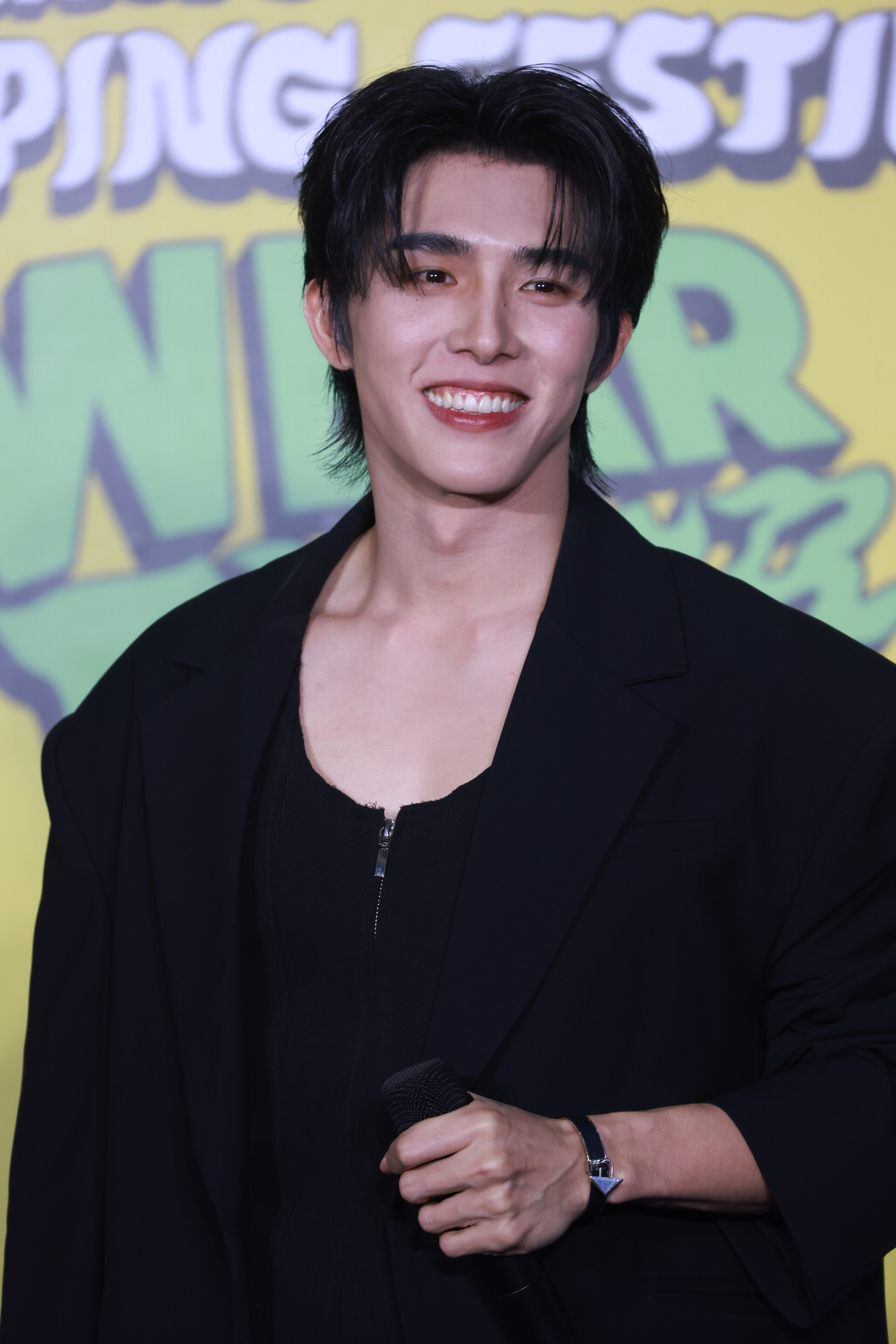
- Raveewit at the DEVY event in June 2025
- Born: 8 August 1991 (age 35); Chonburi Province, Thailand
- Other names: Boom, Rawiwit Chiraphongkanon, Jiratpisit Jaravijit, Jiratpisit Janwijit, Sulun (Chinese name)
- Occupation: Actor
- Years active: 2016–present
- Agent: Headliner Thailand
- Height: 176 cm (5 ft 9 in)

Raveewit Jirapongkanon (Thai: รวีวิชญ์ จิระพงษ์กานนท์; born 8 August 1991), formerly Jiratpisit Jaravijit (Thai: จิรัชพิสิษฐ์ จารวิจิต), nicknamed Boom (Thai: บูม), is a Thai actor. He is best known for his leading roles in Chains of Heart (2023) and Top Form (2025).

== Early life and education ==
Raveewit was born on 8 August 1991 in Chonburi, Thailand. His father is of Chinese descent and his mother is of Thai descent. He is the youngest in the family. His family owns a long-established Thai-Chinese restaurant and his interests are basketball, badminton and cooking. He is fluent in Thai with intermediate level in English and Mandarin. He graduated with a Bachelor of Engineering (Electrical Engineering) from King Mongkut's University of Technology North Bangkok.

== Career ==
Boom began his entertainment career by appearing in minor roles and music videos. His early acting credits include: Bad Romance: The Series (2016), My Dream The Series (2018), The Writers Project: Last Line (2018) and I Need Romance (2021). He was involved with in various genres, gradually building his presence in Thai entertainment industry.

Boom played the leading role as Peter Lue in the BL action thriller drama Chains of Heart in 2023, which aired on Channel 3 and iQIYI . In March 2025, Boom gained broader recognition for his portrayal of Akin in the romantic drama series Top Form (2025). His performance contributed to Top Form trending in Thailand and other territories. He became an ASICS Thailand Brand Advocate in 2021 and has served as an ASICS Ambassador in Thailand from 2024 to 2025.

In 2025 WeTV announced that Boom would be starring in a new series called Akina, which was described as being in the same universe as Top Form. However, in March of 2026 Headliner and WeTV issued joint statements announcing that Boom would not be participating in Akina, choosing instead to go on hiatus to care for his mental health, and his role would be recast.

== Filmography ==
=== Television series ===
Year	Title	Role	Ref
2016	Bad Romance: The Series	Tanguy	
2016	Nang Eye	Mamu	
2016	The Battle to Usurp a Person To Be Continued	Nut	
2018	Bangkok Love Stories: Innocence	Bee	
2018	My Dream	Dr. Good	
2018	The Writers Project: Last Line (Naew Sudtai)	Boonsong	
2019	Theory of Love	Man at the Bar (the male lead’s ex-boyfriend)	
2020	My Engineer	Medical student	
2020	Heart by Heart	Phat	
2021	I Need Romance	Mes	
2023	Chains of Heart	Peter Lue	
2025	Top Form	Akin	

=== Television show ===
Year	Title	Notes
2023	Funday Season 8	Guest (Ep. 2)
2025	Chuang Asia: Season 2	Guest (Ep. 10)
2026	Way to You	Producer/Host

== Discography ==
Boom is the owner of a YouTube channel called BXXM RVW, where he posts content related to music videos and vlogs.

Year	Song title	Notes	Ref
2023	"BT4U (Be There for You)"	Producer : TARO SHATREE; Lyrics & Melody : TARO SHATREE; Arranger : TARO SHATREE; Vocal Director : Ekanai Vorachattarn; Mixing & Mastering : TARO SHATREE.	
2025	"รอยจูบ (Bite Marks)"	OST. Top Form กอดกันมั้ย นายตัวท็อป - Smart Chisanupong and Boom Raveewit.	
2025	"North Star"	Producer : Wisp Team; Lyrics & Compose : Jeaniich, BXXM RVW; Lyrics Director : BXXM RVW; Arrangers : Piyabut Sirisamphan, Sirapop Khomkhum;Vocal Directors : Wisp Team; Backing Vocals : Piyabut Sirisamphan, Jeaniich; Digital Editors : Sirapop Khomkhum, Piyabut Sirisamphan, Jeaniich; Vocal Recorded at PURE KANIN Studio ;Mix & Mastered by Andnew (Assist. Stella) @salpotstudios( Wisp Team : PURE KANIN, Jeaniich, Piyabut Sirisamphan, Sirapop Khomkhum )	
2025	"以你为名的星(When the Stars Will Shine)"	Performed by BXXM RVW, Written by 丁嘉昱; Produced by丁嘉昱; Source: 看见音乐.	

== Magazines ==
Year	Title	Notes	Ref
2021	MANGU E-Magazine Entertainment Issue 212 : ทำความรู้จักกับ "บูม จิรัชพิสิษฐ์ จารวิจิต Boom-Jiratpisit Jaravijit" หนุ่มหล่อที่ไม่ได้มีดีแค่รอยยิ้ม จาก “I Need Romance รักใช่ไหมที่หัวใจต้องการ”	For I Need Romance drama series interview	
2021	MANGU E-Magazine Issue 214 (15 August 2021) คอลัมน์ Star : พบกับ ASICS Thailand (Brand Advocate) ทั้ง 6 ฟลุ๊คจ์-พงศภัทร์ / บูม-จิรัชพิสิษฐ์ / เบียร์-รพีวิชญ์ / คูเปอร์-ภัทรพสิษฐ์ / อินทัช-ณภัทร และ เชน-ณัชพล	As ASICS Thailand (Brand Advocate)	
2023	MANGU E-Magazine Issue 252 (15 March 2023) พบกับ “บูม รวีวิชญ์ จิระพงษ์กานนท์” และ “ไฮด์ ศรุญสธร ธนวัชรวัฒน์” จากซีรีส์ที่กำลังมาแรงในขณะนี้ “ตรวนธรณี (Chains of Heart The Series)”	Boom was featured in a photo spread alongside co-star Haii Sarunsathorn	
2025	Madame Figaro MODE Endless Blossom: Smart & Boom 夏日不落幕	Madame Figaro China	
2025	Harper's Bazaar Eternal Summer 盛夏光年: Boom Raveewit	Harper's Bazaar China	
2025	Grazia 2025 Digital Issues 25: Boom Raveewit in the Echoes of the Starry River 在星河的回响里	Grazia China	
2025	风度 Men's Uno Young October Issue: The Shining Star Boom Raveewit 照亮星空的人	风度 Men's Uno Young China	

== Awards and nominations ==
Year	Award	Category	Nominee/work	Result	Ref
2025	Weibo Gala 2025	Overseas Rising Actor	Top Form	Won	
2025	Feed x Khaosod Awards 2025	The Boy's Love Actor of the Year	Top Form	Nominated	
2025	Feed x Khaosod Awards 2025	Most Popular Male Actor	Boom	Won	
2025	The Viral Hits Awards	Best BL Actor of the Year	Top Form	Nominated	
2026	StarFocus	Most Anticipated Couple 2026 Asian Pacific	with Smart Chisanupong Puangmanee	Nominated	
2026	Thailand Box Office Awards 2025	Best Couple of the Year	with Smart Chisanupong Puangmanee	Nominated	
2026	Thailand Box Office Awards 2025	Best Actor in a Series	Akin in Top Form	Nominated	
2026	Thailand Box Office Awards 2025	Outstanding Rising Star	Boom	Won	
2026	GLBLAwards 2025	Best BL Actor of the Year	Boom	Nominated	
2026	GLBLAwards 2025	Best BL Couple of the Year	with Smart Chisanupong Puangmanee	Nominated	
