= Bangkok Love Stories: Plead =

2019 Thai-language television series

- Genre: Drama
- Created by: Ekachai Uekrongtham
- Starring: Morakot Liu; Chanon Santinatornkul; Sutatta Udomsilp
- Country of origin: Thailand
- Original language: Thai
- No. of seasons: 1
- No. of episodes: 13

Original release
- Network: GMM 25
- Release: February 13 – May 8, 2019

Bangkok Love Stories: Plead is a 2019 segment of the Thai-language television anthology series Bangkok Love Stories, created by Ekachai Uekrongtham and starring Morakot Liu, Chanon Santinatornkul and Sutatta Udomsilp. The plot is set in Chinatown and revolves around Liu (Surapol Poonpiriya) who grinds almonds as his day job, and a fortune teller at nights. Liu's son Tee (Chanon Santinatornkul) is going blind.

The first episode was released on February 13, 2019 and the last on May 8, 2019 on GMM 25.

== Cast ==
- Surapol Poonpiriya as Liu
- Chanon Santinatornkul as Tee
- Cholsawas Tiewwanichkul as Ong
- Sutatta Udomsilp as Elle
- Morakot Liu as Pai

== Release ==
Bangkok Love Stories: Plead was released between February 13, 2019 and May 8, 2019 on GMM 25.
