= The Promise (2017 film) =

- Film poster
- Directed by: Sophon Sakdaphisit
- Written by: Sopana Chaowiwatkul; Supalerk Ningsanond; Sophon Sakdaphisit
- Produced by: Jira Maligool; Vanridee Pongsittisak; Suwimon Techasupinan; Chenchonnee Soonthonsaratul; Weerachai Yaikwawong
- Starring: Namthip Jongrachatawiboon; Apichaya Thongkham
- Production company: Jor Kwang Films
- Distributed by: GDH 559
- Release date: 7 September 2017 (Thailand)
- Running time: 114 minutes
- Country: Thailand
- Language: Thai
- Box office: ฿33.7 million ($1 million)

The Promise, known in Thai as Puen.. Tee Raluek (Thai: เพื่อน.. ที่ระลึก, RTGS: Phuean.. Thi Raluek), is a 2017 Thai horror film directed by Sophon Sakdaphisit and produced by GDH 559/Jor Kwang Films. It stars Namthip Jongrachatawiboon and Apichaya Thongkham, and was shot in Bangkok's famously unfinished Sathorn Unique Tower.

The Promise earned a moderate 33.7 million baht (US$1 million) at the Thai box office, and was the fourth-grossing local film of 2017. The film received mixed reviews; it has been described as formulaic-yet-effective, and criticized for not realizing the potential of the financial-crisis background. The film won the 27th Suphannahong National Film Award for Best Visual Effects.

== Synopsis ==
The film's plot revolves around two teenage friends, Ib and Boum, who decide to commit suicide together at the building as their families face financial ruin during the 1997 Asian financial crisis. However, Boum becomes scared and reneges on the promise. Twenty years later, when she re-visits the building with her daughter, Bell, the result of Boum's past actions returns to haunt them.

== Cast ==
- Namthip Jongrachatawiboon as Boum
- Apichaya Thongkham as Bell
- Thunyaphat Pattarateerachaicharoen as Young Boum
- Panisara Rikulsurakan as Ib
- Deuntem Salitul as Ib's mother
- Benjamin Joseph Varney as Aof
- Suchada Poonpattanasuk as Boum's mother
- Surachai Ningsanond as Boum's father
- Teerapop Songwaja as Mon
- Duangjai Hiransri as Mon's mother
- Sawanee Utoomma as Auntie Chu
- Chaleeda Gilbert as Taew
- Boonchai Jailim as the Neurologist
- Sivapee Mapaisalkij as the Surgeon
- Krieng Wongnongtaey as the Credit officer
