= TV Thunder =

Thai television production company

TV Thunder Public Company Limited
- Native name: บริษัท ทีวี ธันเดอร์ จำกัด (มหาชน)
- Company type: Public company limited
- ISIN: TH6472010003
- Genre: TV shows, dramas, musicals
- Founded: 1993; 33 years ago
- Headquarters: Bangkok, Thailand
- Key people: Sompong Wannipinyo – Chairman; Phatra Pornwanpinyo – Vice President; Pairat Chayudhya – Chairman of the Executive Board; Na Chakkrawan Pinyo – Executive Vice President; Porntit Limthong – managing director; Piyaporn Limthong – Deputy managing director
- Website: http://www.tvthunder.co.th/

TV Thunder Public Company Limited is a television production company in Thailand. The company was founded by Sompong Wannapinyo in 1992, and was listed on the Stock Exchange of Thailand in 2014. Patraporn Wannapinyo has been its chairman, executive president and CEO since 2012. The company has several subsidiaries, including Creatist Media Co., Ltd. (advertising) and EM Entertainment (artist management).

== History ==
TV Thunder emerged after Sompong Wannipinyo, the former chairman of Kita Records, sold the business. Four shows currently have their own studios, and more than 200 programmes, including drama, sitcoms, game shows, quiz shows, documentaries, variety shows and talk shows, are broadcast on Thai television stations including Radio Stations Army Television Channel 5, TV BBTV Channel 7, TV Thailand TV Channel 3, television Modern Nine, ITV, TV rights TV, television PPTV.

TV Thunder owns a publishing business, Thunder Publishing; TVT Artist Management; and TVT Green Park Studio, located in Ladprao, Bangkok, which is currently the 5th largest studio in Southeast Asia.

== Artists ==
=== Actors ===
- Tul Pakorn Thanasrivanitchai (1992)
- Max Nattapol Diloknawarit (1994)
- Simon Kessler (1990)
- Yimkey Kamolwacharathum Suvitayawat (1998)
- Putter Dechphisit Jarukornapiwat (2002)
- Plan Rathavit Kijworalak (1997)

=== Actresses ===
- Maengmum Pimnitchakun Bumrungkit (1995)
- May Matinee Junsoy (1988)
- Muse Alraphatsaya Suksai (1995)

== Affiliates ==
- Creatist Media
- Thunder Studio
- EM Entertainment

== Works ==
=== TV programs ===
==== Game show/quiz show ====
- Transfer Rum Game (1993–1997) Channel 3
- Master Key For Ever (1994–2000), Channel 3
- Master Key The Winner (2001–2002) Channel 3
- Master Key four (2002–2004) 3.
- Master Key 10 Years Gold (2004) Channel 3
- Master Key of Fun (2005–2007) Channel 3
- Master Key Thailand (2007–2008) Channel 3
- Master Key duo music (1 March 2008 – 4 March 2011) 3.
- Master Key Stage gold box (2017) Channel 3
- Master Key Stage Call for a Cause of avalanche (2017–present) Channel 3
- Eat with the game (1996–2001) Channel 5
- Battle of the Cube (about 1994 – 1997) Channel 9
- Cyber Games (1997–1998) Channel 3
- Thank you Games (1998) Channel 3
- Win a secret code (2541–2545) 3.
- I'm with you (1998–1999) Channel 3
- Little Knight (about 1999) Channel 3
- Game of the Year (2000–2001) Channel 3
- Wade led the actor (2000–2004) 3.
- Big Game (about 2002 – 2004) Channel 3
- Love Overflow (2003–2004) ITV Channel
- Crazy Star STAR FEVER (about 2004 – 2005) Channel 3
- The Hero of the Twenties (2005–2006) Channel 5
- Street Fight Game (2006) Channel 3
- Couple of Games (2007) Channel 5
- Out a Thailand Me a Take for (2011–present) 3
- (acquisition of licenses. FremantleMedia Produced with Creed Media)
- Take Guy Out Thailand (2016, 2016 and 2018). Watch through the Live TV application .
- Ono Duel Game Show (Channel 5)
- Golden mask (2012) Modern nine channels
- Money Bags Million (2012–2014) Channel 5
- Woman's Voice is the heart of the selection (2012–2013) Modern nine channels.
- Woman's Voice Mission Conquest (2013) Modern Nine TV Channel
- Family Fighting Games (2013), Modern Nine TV and Channel 5
- (buy Fuji Television Network license)
- Sing the San Luang (2014–2015) Channel TV.
- Who's asking Thailand Public debate (2015–2012) TV channel
- (Purchase of copyright from Armoza Formats)
- Hidden Singer Thailand Mike Secrets (2015 and 2016) Channel 3
- (NBC Universal purchased by Creation Media)
- The Price is Right Thailand The Price is Right (2015–2022)
- (Purchase of copyright from FremantleMedia)
- Ghost Town Game – Hidden – Ghost (2018) Watched through the application TV line.
- Big Heads Thailand Head of the Big City (2018) Channel One
- (purchased from Sony Picture Television)

==== Variety show/talk show ====
- Thriller Wednesday 3
- Flick bouquet, Channel 7, Channel 5 and ITV respectively.
- Sparked box 5
- Ring Side Show (about 2003 – 2004) ITV Channel
- Ono Show (Variety Show) Channel 5 and ITV Channel, respectively.
- What's Up Man What is True hilarious way Truevisions.
- Girls Generation (2012–2014) Channel 5
- At Night Variety (2014–2017) Channel 5
- Dummy (2014–2015) Channel 3
- Chick-fil-A variety of 3 (2014–2015).
- Variety Babies (2015–2016) TV channel.
- Thai Kitchen (2017) Channel 5
- STAR STAR STAR 4.0 (2018) Watched through the TV application line.

==== Reality show ====
- Master Key Stage of Birth (2011–2017) Channel 3
- Thailand Dance Now ... extremes (2013) Channel 3
- (purchase of Fremantle Media copyrighted by Creation Media)
- Dance Your Fat Off Dance ... change life (2013–2015) Channel 3
- (Buy NBC Universal, produced with Creed Media)
- La Banda Thailand Soup of Star Boy Band (30 July 2016 – 3 December 2016 and 25 June 2017 – 3 September 2017) Channel 3
- (Purchase of Fremantle Media Produced with Creed Media)
- The Golden Singer Thailand (May 6, 2017 – July 8, 2017) Channel 3
- (Produced with Creation Media)
- The Journey (4 September 1993 – 13 November 2020) Channel 3
- (produced jointly with TV Asahi Corporation )
- Dance Dance Dance Thailand (started in the year 2018). Watch through the application of TV line
- (purchase of copyright from Talpa Network, a subsidiary of Talpa Media Group)

=== Films/TV series ===
==== Sitcom ====
- Pak Canal (2002–2003) Channel 5
- The Seven Deadly Sins (2006–2011) Channel 7
- 8/18/28 Twin House 2 (2005) Channel 3
- Twin House 2 (2006) Channel 3
- Clutter Home Sweet Love (1993–1994) 3.
- Invisible Friends (2008) Channel 3
- Public Health Channel (2010–present) Channel 3
- Salad Single Company Channel 9 (Modern Nine TV)
- Couples Channel 9 (Modern 9 TV)
- Sathorn Don Chedi 9 Channel, MCOTHD

==== Dramas ====
- Mental latch 3
- High Tech Girl Channel 3
- Gourmet Chef Channel 3
- Channel 3
- Dear little idea how much 3.
- Mother and Grandmother Fish Channel 3
- The man in the fog Channel 3
- Morale dropped Hall 3
- Cat and Grill Fish Channel 3
- Extremely skittish 3
- Clay Wine with Wine Channel 3
- Love the end of love 3
- Love from the sky, Channel 3
- Occurs at Heart Channel 3
- Successor 3
- Viman Rose 3
- Heart disease channel 3
- Eteakinผakbugg 3
- Tiger Singing Bull Channel 3
- Love Channel 3
- Summer Vacation 3
- Love Channel 3
- I'm not the only one.
- Three Singles 3
- What is your favorite movie?
- Dashing young girl wearing heart crush on ITV.
- Sweet peppers, spicy brown channel ITV.
- Sky with ITV Channel
- Top managers love ITV.
- The farmhouse with the ITV channel.
- The Heartbreakers Channel 7
- Friends invisible Channel 3
- Seventh Seventh Path
- Tiny, sincere, Channel 7
- Heroes of the Earth Channel 9
- Love Mantra Thung Lan 9
- Village elder daughter 3
- Shake off Channel 3
- Love the channel 7
- Heartless Pollution Channel 7
- The godfather needs a ninja kid, Channel 3.
- The market is not broken love Channel 7
- I'm in love with you.
- The market is broken. Channel 7
- Bride and Groom Channel 3
- Lady Banna Channel 3
- Mommy Mickey Mouse Channel 3
- A Little Tainted Heart 3
- Bisexuality Mae Ya Honey Channel 3
- The man in the fog Channel 3
- Ban Thung Chong 3
- The way through Cupid Channel 3
- Little girl 3 million channel 3
- Bad Romance the series PPTV
- Together With Me the series LINETV
- Back parasitic channel 3
- Singha Na Ka Channel 3
- West twilight 3

=== Concert ===
- Once in a Life Time CONCERT Produced by Phusit Laithong – 20–21 March 2010 Thailand Cultural Center
- ONO Uncensored Concert 2003 – December 2003 Thailand Cultural Center

=== Books ===
- Eat around town
- Playboy Playboy

== Other sources ==
- TV Thunder
