= Bad Romance: The Series =

2016 Thai television series

- Genre: Comedy, Friendship, Romance
- Starring: Tomo Visava Thaiyanont; Maengmum Pimnitchakun Bumrungkit; Tul Pakorn Thanasrivanitchai; Max Nattapol Diloknawarit
- Opening theme: "The Person Who's Sad Probably Isn't You" (Thai: คนที่เสียใจคงไม่ใช่เธอ) sung by Pete Pitipong
- Country of origin: Thailand
- Original language: Thai
- No. of episodes: 13

Production
- Camera setup: Multiple-camera setup
- Running time: 75 minutes
- Production company: TV Thunder

Original release
- Network: PPTV HD 36; Line TV
- Release: July 18 – September 5, 2016

Related
- Together with Me

Bad Romance: The Series (Thai title: ตกหลุมหัวใจยัยปีศาจ Dtok Loom Hua Jai Yai Bpee Saht) is a 2016 Thai straight and boys’ love romantic comedy series aired on PPTV HD, TV Thunder and Line TV. It is broadcast on Mondays and Tuesdays from 19:30 to 21:00 (Bangkok Standard Time) on television and aired at 22:00 on Line TV during the same days. The series is based on a novel of the same name. It contains a total of 13 episodes with an average span of 75 minutes each. The series started its airing on 18 July 2016 and ended on 5 September 2016. The story revolves around a group of people who met and became friends, and how they deal with their feelings toward each other.

There are two main couples in the series. The first one is tagged as a boy-girl (or “straight”) couple of Tomo Visava Thaiyanont and Maengmum Pimnitchakun Bumrungkit who play the roles of Cho and Yihwa, respectively; and the other one is the “boys love” a couple of Max Nattapol Diloknawarit and Tul Pakorn Thanasrivanitchai playing the roles of Korn and Knock, respectively. Similar to other Thai dramas, also there are some other couples and actors who bring life to the series. Most of the scenes are taken in a university and in condominiums where they live.

The series has garnered positive citations not just in Thailand, but also in specific communities in the Philippines, Vietnam, Cambodia, Japan, and Singapore.

A prequel focusing on the couple of Korn and Knock on how they met and fall in love, titled Together With Me with 13 episodes was announced and released in August 2017.

== Plot ==
Yihwa, a single university girl, believes that she doesn’t need boys in her life because she can survive without them, and thinks that boys are like iPhones that are only for decorative purposes. However, when she goes to the condominium unit of her best friend Korn, who is celebrating his anniversary with his partner Knock, she meets Korn’s friend, Cho, who falls in love with her at first sight. But Yihwa does not feel the same way; instead, she thinks that Cho is gay and he wants to have a relationship with Knock. After that day, Cho starts to pursue her, however, he has a hard time trying to please her and experiences many ups-and-downs before he becomes close to her.

== Cast ==
- Tomo Visava Thaiyanont as Cho
- Maengmum Pimnitchakun Bumrungkit as Yihwa
- Tul Pakorn Thanasrivanitchai as Knock
- Max Nattapol Diloknawarit as Korn
- Tharanya Manoleehakol as My Dear
- Mikala Hazelwood as Beauty
- Simon Kessler as James
- Jiratpisit Jarawijit as Tanguy
- Thanaporn Rattanasasiwimon as Dewey
- Theekapat Chanwittayapong as Martín
- Petei Hokari as Being

== Soundtrack ==
- "The One Who Will Be Sorry Is Probably Not You" (Thai: คนที่เสียใจคงไม่ใช่เธอ) by Pete Pitipong
- "The One Who Will Be Sorry Is Probably Not You" (Thai: คนที่เสียใจคงไม่ใช่เธอ) (acoustic cover version) by Tul Pakorn Thanasrivanitchai
