= Namthip Jongrachatawiboon =

Thai actress, model and singer (born 1982)

- น้ำทิพย์ จงรัชตวิบูลย์
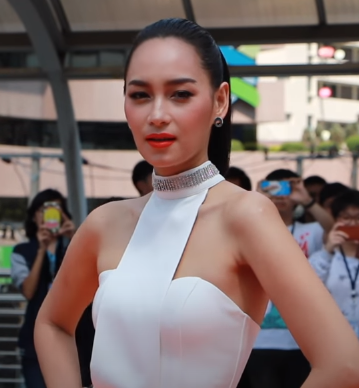
- Namthip in 2017
- Born: 23 November 1982 (age 43); Bangkok, Thailand
- Other name: Bee (บี)
- Education: Benjamarachanusorn School
- Occupations: Actress; model; singer
- Years active: 1994–present
- Known for: Song Kram Nang Fah (2008); The Face Thailand (2015-2018); The Promise (2017); Mia 2018 (2018)
- Website: Official website

Namthip Jongrachatawiboon (Thai: น้ำทิพย์ จงรัชตวิบูลย์; RTGS: Namthip Chongratchatawibun; born 23 November 1982), nicknamed Bee (Thai: บี), is a Thai film and television actress, singer and model from Exact. Namthip started her career in entertainment industry at the age of 12 in advertising. She was introduced by Araya Indra - one of the famous fashion stylists in Thailand. Fashion shooting of JASPAL is her first job as a model since she was 14, followed by many fashion modelings and some music video shootings. She became a singer in 1999 after the Rak Mak Ken Pai music video, she released her first album in 2000. She later transitioned into acting in 2001 in her first drama Lued Hong (Thai: เลือดหงส์).

== Filmography ==
=== Television ===
Year	Title	Role(s)	Network	Notes	With						
Year	Title	Role(s)	Network	Notes	With	2001	เลือดหงส์ Lued Hong	Namphon	Channel 5	Lead Role	Tew Sunthipar
2002	เพลิงมายา; Pleung Maya	Prangchai	CH7	Lead Role	Arnus Rapanich						
2002	กระท่อมแสงเงิน; Krathom Saengngoen	Kradangnga	Thai TV3	Lead Role	Sarawut Marttong						
2003	วิมานดิน; Wimarn Din	Yanang	Thai TV3	Lead Role	Kade Tarntup						
2005	วิมานทราย; Wimarn Sai	Alizsara	Channel 5	Lead Role	Shahkrit Yamnam						
2006	พรายปรารถนา; Prai Prattana	Kirana	Thai TV3	Lead Role	Thanakorn Poshyananda						
2006	หนุ่มห้าวสาวใสหัวใจปิ๊ง; Noom Hao Sao Sai Hua Jai Ping	Pimporn	ITV	Lead Role	Rattapong Tanapat						
2007	แสงสูรย์ Sang Soon	Daw	CH7	Main Cast	None						
2007	ทะเลริษยา; Talay Rissaya	Fah Sai	Channel 5	Lead Role	Nawat Kulrattanarak						
2008	สงครามนางฟ้า; Song Kram Nang Fah	Rin	Channel 5	Lead Role	Nawat Kulrattanarak						
2008	ความลับของ Superstar; Kwarm Lub Kaung Superstar	Natedao	Channel 5	Main Cast	Phutanate Hongmanop						
2009	อาทิตย์ชิงดวง; Artit Ching Duang	Panrawee	Channel 5	Guest	Phutanate Hongmanop						
2009	บ่วงรักกามเทพ; Buang Ruk Kamathep	Oranicha	Channel 5	Lead Role	Nawat Kulrattanarak						
2010	จับตายวายร้ายสายสมร; Jub Tai Wai Rai Sai Samorn	Waen	Channel 5	Lead Role	Saksit Tangtong						
2011	เมียไม่ใช่เมีย; Mia Mai Chai Mia	Vikarnda Kungwaklai	Channel 5	Main Cast	None						
2012	กุหลาบซาตาน; Kularb Satan	Rose Haller/Pingo	Channel 5	Lead Role	Phutanate Hongmanop						
2012	มารยาริษยา; Maya Rissaya	Peangdao	Channel 5	Lead Role	Navin Yavapolkul						
2013	เรือนเสน่หา; Ruen Saneha	Chom	Channel 5	Main Cast	Saksit Tangtong						
2014	อนิลทิตา; Anintita	Anintita/Chomsurang	Channel 5	Main Cast	None						
2016	เรือนร้อยรัก; Ruen Roy Rak	Khun Waat	One 31	Lead Role	Phutanate Hongmanop						
2016	เสน่หาข้ามเส้น; Sanaeha Kram Sen	Bussaya	One 31	Lead Role	None						
2016	เราเกิดในรัชกาลที่ ๙ เดอะซีรีส์ Rao Kuerd Nai Ratchakarn Tee Kao The Series	Doctor Pin	One 31	Lead Role	None						
2016	สงครามนางงาม 2 Songkram Nang Ngarm 2	Nada	One 31	Guest Role (Ep. 15, 16. 17)	None						
2017	บ่วงหงส์ Buang Hong	Mathawee	Thai TV3	Main Cast	None						
2017	แต่ปางก่อน; Tae Pang Korn	tai	One 31	Main Cast	None						
2018	เมืองมายา Live; Meung Maya Live	Phaphai	One 31	Lead Role	Yong Armchair						
2018	ชะนีหนีคาน (บ้านสราญแลนด์); Ban Saranlan	Apple	One 31	Lead Role	Ak Akkarat						
2018	เมีย 2018 #รักเลือกได้ Mia 2018	Aruna	One 31	Lead Role	Nawat Kulrattanarak						
2018	สงครามนักปั้น; Song Karm Nuk Pun	Pure	One 31	Main Cast	Puttichai Kasetsin						
2019	สงครามนักปั้น 2 Song Karm Nuk Pun 2	Pure	One 31	Main Cast	Metinee Kingpayom						
2020	ลวงละเมอรัก; Sleepless Society The Series	Kate	One 31	Lead Role	Vorarit Fuagarome						
2020	ฉันชื่อบุษบา; Chun Cheu Bussaba	Busaba	One 31	Main Role	Thanapat Kawila						
2021	Club Friday The Series 12 Uncharted Love รักซ่อนเร้น ตอน เรื่องเศร้าของคนโสด; Club Friday The Series 12	Je	One 31	Main Role	Pakorn Lam						
2022	พิษรักรอยอดีต; Phit Rak Roi Adeet	Nisa	One 31	Main Role	Pasut Banyam						
2022	รักสุดท้ายยัยจอมเหวี่ยง; Rak Sutthai Yai Jom Wiang	Phichareeya Panjapinyo (Paed)	One 31	Main Role	Saran Naraprasertkul						
2023	ไฟลวง; Fai Luang	Ponwalai Sarojsathit (Walai)	Amarin TV	Main Role	Sarawut Marttong						

=== Film ===
Year	Title	Role(s)	Studio				
Year	Title	Role(s)	Studio	2017	The Promise	Boum	GDH

=== Awards ===
Awards
Year	Award	Category	Nominated Work	Result
2005		Best actress	Wimarn Sai	Won
2006	4th Komchatluek Awards	Best Supporting Actress	Sea of Greed	Won
2007	Asian Television Awards	Best Leading Actress	Saeng Soon	Nominated
2008	Siam Dara Party Awards	Best Leading Actress	Battle of Angles	Nominated
2008	6th Komchatluek Awards	Best Leading Actress	Battle of Angles	Nominated
2008	23rd TV Gold Awards	Best Leading Actress	Kwarm Lub Kaung Superstar	Nominated
2008	Hamburger Magazine Awards	Best Leading Actress	Kwarm Lub Kaung Superstar	Nominated
2008	Nataraj Awards	Best Leading Actress	Kularb Satan	Nominated
2009	10th Komchatluek awards	Best Leading Actress	Manyarisaya	Nominated
2009	Nataraj Awards	Best Leading Actress	Ruen Sanaeha	Nominated
2011	24th Mek-kla Awards	Most Popular Actress	Mea Mai Chai Mea	Won
2012	25th Mek-kla Awards	Most Popular Actress	Manyarisaya	Won
2013	Star Light Awards	Most Beautiful Leg	—N/a	Won
2014	29th TV Gold Awards	Best Supporting Actress	Anintita	Nominated
2015	Golden Bells Awards	Person of the Year	—N/a	Won
2017	KAZZ Awards	Trending Girl of the Year	—N/a	Won
2017	KAZZ Awards	Ship of the Year (With Cris Horwang)	The Face Thailand	Won
2018	27th Suphannahong National Film Awards	Best Leading Actress	The Promise	Nominated
2018	27th Suphannahong National Film Awards	Most Popular Leading Actress (Voting)	The Promise	Won
2018	26th Bangkok Critics Assembly Awards	Best Actress	The Promise	Nominated
2018	10th Siam Dara Star Awards	Best Actress	The Promise	Nominated
2018	31st Golden Doll Awards	Best Actress	The Promise	Nominated
2018	15th Starpics Thai Film Awards	Best Actress	The Promise	Nominated
2018	Daradaily Award	Best Actress of The Year	The Promise	Won
2018	Thailand Fever Award 2017	Best Lead Actress	The Promise	Won
2018	OK! Beauty Choice 2018	Best Actress	Mia 2018	Won
2019	MThai Top Talk-About 2019	Most Mentioned Actress	Mia 2018	Won
2019	Daradaily Award	Best Actress in a Drama Series	Mia 2018	Nominated
2019	10th Nataraj Awards	Best Actress	Mia 2018	Nominated
2023	19th Kom Chad Luek Awards	Best Supporting Actress	Revenge from the Past	Nominated
2023	10th Face Of The Year Awards	Most Popular Foreign TV Actress (Voting)	Revenge from the Past	Won
2024	11th Face Of The Year Awards	Most Popular Foreign TV Actress (Voting)	The Battle of Stars	Won
2026	40th TV Gold Awards	Best Supporting Actress	Rabbit on The moon	Nominated

=== TV program ===
1. Poo Ying Teung Poo Ying Suay

=== Mentor ===
In The Face Thailand, she first appeared as a temporary coach for Chermarn Boonyasak in episode 9, helping the team win the campaign. She officially coached season 2 with Lukkade Metinee & Cris Horwang. Although she only officially joined " The Face Thailand " in season 2 and is the youngest coach but Bee was quickly impressed by the personality, not to lose anyone. Thus, the winner finally called her team Kanticha Chumma. Bee continued to accompany Season 3 along with Lukkade Metinee & Marsha Wattanapanich, which received much support from viewers who loved the show. In early 2018, she's back to be a mentor of The Face Thailand Season 4 All Stars again, and she is partner with Sririta Jensen, so the team name is TeamBeeRita.

- The Face Thailand (season 2) Champion
- The Face Thailand (season 3) Runner-Up
- The Face Thailand (season 4 All Stars) Runner-Up

== Discography ==
Namthip Jongrachatawiboon discography
- Studio albums: 5
- Singles: 7

=== Cover Version ===
1. 2017:เดียวดายกลางสายลม (Cover Version Ost The Promise (2017 film))

=== Studio albums ===
1. Unbravable Woman
2. B2
3. B The Best
4. OST-Prai Prattana
5. Her Song

=== Music video ===
1. 1999: Rak Mak Kern Pai
2. 1999: Ying Tou Ying Suay Blackhead
3. 1999: Spec
4. 1999: Mai Chai Luey
5. 2000: Tong Mai Rub
6. 2005: Tao Tee Mee
7. 2009: Mai Luer Hed Pol Ja Rak
8. None: ไม่เหลือเหตุผลจะรัก - แก้ม วิชญาณี
9. 2013: ความเจ็บยังคงหายใจ - อ๊อฟ ปองศักดิ์
10. 2015: Nick Studio54 - หยุดก่อน
11. 2016: เปลวไฟ - Blackhead
