= Pimnitchakun Bumrungkit =

Thai-Chinese actress, model and singer (born 1995)

- พิมพ์นิชกุล บำรุงกิจ
- Born: November 5, 1995 (age 30); Samut Prakan, Thailand
- Other names: Maengmum (แมงมุม); Tanshi (ฑันท์ชิย์)
- Occupations: Actress; model; singer
- Years active: 2008–present
- Notable work: Bad Romance: The Series; Together With Me; Together With Me: The Next Chapter

Pimnitchakun Bumrungkit (Thai: พิมพ์นิชกุล บำรุงกิจ; born 5 November 1995), nicknamed Maengmum (Thai: แมงมุม), is a Thai-Chinese actress, model and singer from the company TV Thunder.

== Biography ==
Maengmum was born in Samut Prakan, Thailand. She is the second child of the family and she has one older sister named Maengpor and one younger brother named Ice. Her sister gave birth to a son February 22, 2018, making Maengmum an aunt to Little Vampire. Maengmum is 163 cm tall, weighs 45 kg and her zodiac sign is Scorpio.

=== Education & Personal life ===
She studied in Poonpokphol Kindergarten in Samut Prakan, graduated Elementary school from Praditsueksa in Chantaburi, attended Kasem Phithaya Junior High School in Bangkok, went to Adventist Ekamai Senior High school in Bangkok and she graduated from Bangkok University March 17, 2019, where she majored in Airline Business Management since 2014.

At first she planned to study film in Silpakorn University, because it matched her work. But then she decided to study airline business management in Bangkok University's tourism department because it's very interesting and she can learn English there.

On September 2, 2019, Maengmum changed her name on social media, now known as Tanshi. Later on Facebook she explained that "Tanshi" (ฑันท์ชิย์) is a name that her mother gave her.

== Career ==
=== 2008–2014: Early career ===
Maengmum entered the entertainment industry by becoming a TV show host for "Strawberry Cheesecake" in 2008. She quit being a TV show host in 2010, and started appearing more on TV series and movies. One of her first dramas was "Seub Suan Puan Ruk" (สืบสวนป่วนรัก), where she played the supporting character Tit on August 16, 2010. In 2011 she also appeared on its sequel "Suepsuan Puan Kamlang 3" (สืบสวนป่วนกำลัง 3) where she reprised her role as Tit. After those series, she continued to appear on smaller, less known dramas; "Khwam Hwang Sudthai" as Smorn in 2012, "Luk Mai Lai Lai Khon" as Thiporn (Nuwi) in 2012–2013 and "Hlung Tham Ha Chon" as Po in 2013–2014.

She made her film debut in 2012 in the film called "Rak Sudthai Pa Na" as a character named Sa, and later appeared in another movie in 2014 titled "Hmuy Cin Din Kong Lok" as Hmuy.

=== 2016–2018: Rising popularity ===
On January 6, 2016, she appeared on a drama called "Sao Noi Roy Larn" (สาวน้อยร้อยล้าน) playing another supporting character called Mali. Then, she finally had her first major drama role in "Bad Romance" where she played the sassy main character Yihwa alongside Tomo Visava Thaiyanont who played Yihwa's love interest, Cho. The series aired from July 18, 2016, to September 5, and it was a great success and garnered positive citations not just in Thailand, but also in specific communities in the Philippines, Vietnam, Cambodia, Japan, and Singapore.

In 2017, Maengmum also appeared in the prequel for "Bad Romance" titled "Together With Me" as Yihwa again, acting alongside co-stars Max Nattapol Diloknawarit and Tul Pakorn Thanasrivanitchai who played Korn and Knock, Yihwa's two best friends. This series was very popular too, which gave Maengmum and the other actors in the series a lot of recognition, allowing for them to give multiple interviews and attending fan meetings such as "Together With Me in Chengdu", "Altogether in Manila" and "Together With Me Warm Up Party in Krabi".

In early 2018, "Together With Me The Next Chapter" was announced, the sequel to "Together With Me", where Maengmum would once again reprise her iconic role as Yihwa alongside her old cast. It has been announced that the series would first air September 28, 2018. On September 28, 2018, Maengmum along with the cast of "Together With Me The Next Chapter" held a fan meet event in Krabi, Thailand where they also premiered the 1st episode of the series.

==== Singing career ====
October 3, 2018 Maengmum released her first official song titled "ยังไงก็เสียใจ (SORRY)" as the OST for Together With Me The Next Chapter. She sang it live for the first time in Thai TV show "Masterkey" on October 5, 2018. The song is available in YouTube, Spotify and other music apps. Before releasing an official song, she uploaded song covers in her own YouTube channel.

== Filmography ==
=== Dramas ===
Year	Title	Character
2010	Seub Suan Puan Ruk (สืบสวนป่วนรัก)	Tit
2011	Suepsuan Puan Kamlang 3 (สืบสวนป่วนกำลังสาม)	Tit
2012	Khwam Hwang Sudthai (ความหวังสุดท้าย)	Smorn
2012–2013	Luk Mai Lai Lai Khon (ลูกไม้หลายๆต้น)	Thiporn (Nuwi)
2013–2014	Luang Ta Mahachon (หลวงตามหาชน)	Po
2016	Sao Noi Roy Larn (สาวน้อยร้อยล้าน)	Mali
2016	Bad Romance The Series	Yihwa
2017	Sathorn Don Chedi (สาทร ดอนเจดีย์)	Baw
2017	Together With Me The Series	Yihwa
2018	Together With Me The Next Chapter	Yihwa
2018	Saneha Stories (เสน่หาสตอรี่)	Be
2019	Case Partners (คู่ซ่าคดีป่วน)	Maengpor
2019	Singha Na Ka (สิงหะนาคะ)	Kaew
2021	Paint with Love	NaeNae
2021-2022	From Zero to Hero (ความสูญเสีย)	Pat

=== Films ===
Year	Title	Character
2012	First Kiss	Sa (Young)
2014	Hmuy Cin Din Kong Lok (หมวยจิ้นดิ้นก้องโลก)	Hmuy
2018	World's AIDS Day Short Film (With Tul Pakorn)	-

=== TV shows ===
Year	Title	Notes
2008-2010	Strawberry Cheesecake	Host
2012	Mango TV	Guest
2012	Beauty Cafe	Guest
2013	Roommate	Guest (Ep. 22)
2013	Beauty Update	Host
2015	Masterkey	Host
2016	Green Touch	Guest
2016	Morning News (ยกทัพข่าวเช้า)	Guest along with Tomo Visava where they showed Bad Romance behind the scenes
2016	Morning News (ยกทัพข่าวเช้า)	Guest along with Bad Romance actors Max Nattapol, Tul Pakorn and Tomo Visava
2016	Celebrities (สำรับคนดัง)	Guest with Tomo (Ep. 118)
2017	Boom Thailand	Guest with Bad Romance actor Simon Kessler (Ep. 13–15)
2018	Ghost Town	Scary show where Maengmum and other "Together With Me" actors were present (Ep. 9)

== Various ==
=== Host ===
- Strawberry Cheesecake Shop Channel 3
- Beauty Caf'e
- Master key stage
- Z Z GENERATION
- Coke list (Scoop)

=== Music videos ===
- ยิ่งดูยิ่งดี ศิลปิน ว่าน ธนกฤต (The more I look, the more good-looking you get)
- ไม่สำคัญอะไร ศิลปิน natural sense (Don't really matter)
- มีจริงหรือเปล่า ศิลปิน พินต้า (Does it really exist?)
- รักตัวเองก็พอ ศิลปิน พัดชา AF2 (Loving myself is enough)
- อกมีไว้หัก ศิลปิน เบิร์ด ธงไชย (Heart is for breaking)
- อาย ศิลปิน โปเตโต้ (Shy)
- ไม่รู้จะอธิบายยังไง ศิลปิน โปเตโต้ (Don't know how to explain)
- Who Cares ผิดที่เขา ศิลปิน หวาย (Who cares)
- ถ้าหัวใจมีมือ - ASOG (ROCKCAMP by UP^G)
- เจ็บที่ยังรัก AROUND
