= Chisanupong Paungmanee =

Thai actor

Chisanupong Puangmanee
- ชิษณุพงศ์ พวงมณี
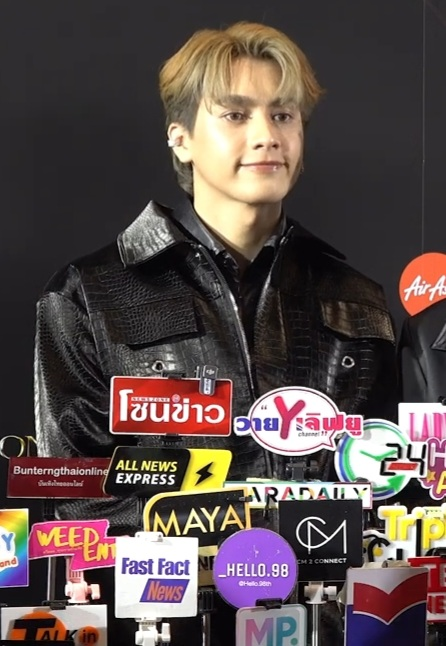
- Smart May 2025
- Born: 21 September 2001 (age 24); Khanom, Thailand
- Other names: Smart; CSNP
- Education: Chandrakasem Rajabhat University
- Occupations: Actor; Singer
- Years active: 2020–present
- Agent: Grand Ivory Record
- Known for: Jin in Top Form; Leon in Don't Say No
- Height: 1.83 m (6 ft 0 in)

Chisanupong Puangmanee (Thai: ชิษณุพงศ์ พวงมณี; born 21 September 2001), nicknamed Smart (Thai: สมาร์ท) is a Thai actor and musician. He is known for his roles in Don't Say No (2021) and Top Form (2025). He also releases music under the name CSNP.

== Early life and education ==
Smart Chisanupong Puangmanee was born September 21, 2001, in Khanom, Thailand. He describes himself as a shy but mischievous child and an introvert. He was staying with an uncle in Bangkok when he was approached by a modeling agency and invited to work in the entertainment industry and found he enjoyed it. His first job was "being a Smart Boy for Channel 7". He studied at Chandrakasem Rajabhat University in Bangkok.

Smart was introduced as a trainee under YOMA Entertainment in 2021. In 2022 he was revealed as a member of a co-ed group called SPF+ Project, with a group debut on December 16, 2022, with a digital single "Fish N Fly". The group disbanded after a few years.

== Career ==
In 2021 Smart was cast in his first BL series, Don't Say No the series. He played Leon, the younger brother to Ja Pachara's character Leo. He was paired with James Pongsapak, and the two were praised for their on-screen chemistry. A spinoff series focused on their pairing, called Just Say Yes, was announced but not produced.

In 2024 Smart was cast in a lead role for the live-action adaptation of the Japanese manga Dakaichi, alongside industry veteran "Boom" Raveewit Jirapongkanon. The series, titled Top Form, was produced by WeTV in cooperation with Tailai Entertainment. The first episode released in March 2025.

Top Form was praised for its adherence to the source material as well as the chemistry between the two leads, and trended worldwide for every episode. Smart and Boom were announced as an official CP in May and nominated for several awards, including Best Couple of the Year for the Thailand Box Office Awards.

On August 30, 2025, Smart made his solo music debut under Grand Ivory Records with a mini-album titled "Call Me CSNP", followed by singles titled "Low Batt" and "All Night".

== Controversy and WeTV Lawsuit ==
During the production of TopForm, Smart was represented by a collaborative partnership between Grand Ivory Records(GIR) and Image Future (Headliner TH). In May 2025, GIR announced that this collaboration had ended, setting off speculation with fans. However, GIR assured fans that the SmartBoom partnership would continue.

In June 2025 WeTV Thailand and Headliner Thailand announced that all previously announced couple events for Smart and Boom had been cancelled due to contract disputes.

On 13 March 2026, WeTV announced a lawsuit against Smart and his agency, Grand Ivory Records, citing breach of contract.

== Filmography ==
=== Movies ===
Year	Title	Role	Ref.
2023	Moments of Love	(My Crazy Romance) Smart	

=== Television series ===
Year	Title	Role	Notes	Ref.
2021	Don't Say No	Leon	Supporting role	
2022	Love in the Air	Leon	Guest (Ep. 12)	
2025	Top Form	Jin	Main role	

=== TV Shows ===
Year	Title	Role	Notes	Ref.
2020	SosatSeoulsay	Guest	Ep. 278	
2021	Don't Say No: Behind the Scenes	Himself		
2021	Don't Say No: Cast Reaction	Himself	Ep. 4–5, 7–12	
2021	T-Pop Stage Show	Guest	Ep. 165	
2021	Me Mind Y Variety	Guest	Ep. 6	
2021	Me Mind Y Variety: You and I, Who's the Werewolf?	Regular		
2021	Love in the Air Behind the Scenes	Guest	Ep. 12	
2025	Chuang Asia Season 2	Guest	Ep. 10	
2025	Top Form Behind the Scenes	Regular		
2025	The Making of Top Form	Regular		
2025	Thailand Music Countdown 2025	Guest	Ep. 20	
2025	Smart Boom's Diary	Himself		

== Music ==
Year	Title	Notes	Label
2025	Fish N Fly	With SPF Project (Smart/Pakkad/Focus) feat. Rika; Composed by Resweet Music Studio/Nukul Kittimahachai(Pkae); Written by: Focus/Smart/Pakkad/Rika/Resweet Music Studio	Grand Ivory Record
2025	"รอยจบ (Bite Marks)"	OST Top Form กอดกนมย นายตวทอป - Smart Chisanupong and Boom Raveewit. Producer: Jones Lee; Lyric: Saithip Wiwattanapattapee; Melody: Jones Lee; Vocal director and piano: Watchara Kanteeyaporn; Mix & mastering: Wuttipong Pawawatanyou	Collaboration between WeTV and Talai Entertainment
2025	"Crispy"	Producer: nnenox; Lyrics: nnenox; Beat maker: changer pink; Vocal Engineering: MISSIN; Mix and Mastered: Songlee; Vocal Director: Pkae	Grand Ivory Record
2025	"Bleed Cold"	Producer: nnenox; Lyrics: nnenox; Beat maker: changer pink; Vocal Engineering: MISSIN; Mix and Mastered: Songlee; Vocal Director: Pkae	Grand Ivory Record
2025	"Limousine"	Producer: nnenox; Lyrics: nnenox; Beat maker: changer pink; Vocal Engineering: MISSIN; Mix and Mastered: Songlee; Vocal Director: Pkae	Grand Ivory Record
2026	"Low Batt"	Producer and lyricist: Netirat Junto; Musician and composer: changer Pink; Arranger: Songlee	Grand Ivory Record

== Awards and nominations ==
Year	Award	Category	Nominee/work	Result	Ref
2026	StarFocus	Most Anticipated Couple 2026 Asian Pacific	with Boom Raveewit Jirapongkanon	Nominated	
2026	Thailand Box Office Awards 2025	Best Couple of the Year	with Boom Raveewit Jirapongkanon	Nominated	
2026	GLBLAwards 2025	Best BL Actor of the Year	Smart	Nominated	
2026	GLBLAwards 2025	Best BL Couple of the Year	with Boom Raveewit Jirapongkanon	Nominated	
