= Sea of Greed =

- Original title: ทะเลริษยา
- Genre: Drama; Revenge
- Written by: Patikarn Phejmunee; Patmaphon Khenphaphong
- Directed by: Chatchai Surasit
- Starring: Namthip Jongrachatawiboon; Nawat Kulrattanarak
- Theme music composer: Wathiya Ruayniratana
- Opening theme: Aht Ja Mee Suk Wun (There Might Be Some Day) by Wathiya Ruayniratana
- Country of origin: Thailand
- Original language: Thai
- No. of episodes: 36 (original Thai broadcast); 31 (international versions); 18 (Thai home media release)

Production
- Producers: Exact; Scenario
- Production location: Thailand
- Running time: around 40 minutes

Original release
- Network: Channel 5 One 31 (Remake)
- Release: 23 November 2006 – 24 January 2007

Related
- Roy Adeed Hang Ruk; Laong Dao

Sea of Greed (Thai: ทะเลริษยา; RTGS: Thale Ritsaya) is a Thai television drama, premiered on November 23, 2006 and last aired on January 24, 2007 on Channel 5. It starred Namthip Jongrachatawiboon and Nawat Kulrattanarak.

== Summary ==
In Bangkok 1984, Dujdao (Karnjana Jindawat) and Ekarin (Nirut Sirijanya) are rich owners of a hotel. One of their servants are Pavinee (Sinjai Plengpanich) who is a poor woman with a son, making her jealous of their wealth. One day, when Dujdao and Ekarin on a boat, a huge storm passes by. Pavinee tries to help Dujdao, until Pavinee drops her and the baby in the sea. However, Dujdao and the baby is still alive and they now live with a fisherman named Naengnin (Kriengkrai Unhanan) and his son Sai Lom (Puri Hiranpruk), Dujdao lives with them under the new name Khimut. After the boat incident, Pavinee tells Ekarin that Dujdao and the baby died on the boat, and Pavinee becomes the concubine of Ekarin. Twenty-five years later, Pavinee's son, Pat (Nawat Kulrattanarak) moves into the resort and Dujdao's baby, Fah Sai (Namthip Jongrachatawiboon) now works Ekarin's hotel, unaware to Ekarin that she is his biological daughter, though he treats her like one. Pavinee becomes suspicious about this. They begin to find out about the truth and Pavinee stills to take everything and figures out that Dujdao is still alive and tries to stop Fah Sai from falling in love with Pat.

== Cast ==
- Sinjai Plengpanich as Pavinee
- Nawat Kulrattanarak as Pat
- Namthip Jongrachatawiboon as Fah Sai
- Puri Hiranpruk as Sai Lom
- Nithichai Yotamornsunthorn as Wangwit
- Karnjana Jindawat as Dujdao/Khimut
- Ranya Siyanon as Tikana
- Nutanone Geyadiradathani as Tinut
- Nirut Sirijanya as Ekarin
- Kriengkrai Unhanan as Naengnin
