= Dakaichi =

Japanese manga series

- Dakaichi: I'm Being Harassed By the Sexiest Man of the Year
- First tankōbon volume cover

抱かれたい男1位に脅されています。 (Dakaretai Otoko Ichi-i ni Odosarete Imasu.)
- Genre: Yaoi
- Manga
- Written by: Hashigo Sakurabi
- Published by: Libre Publishing
- English publisher: NA: Futekiya
- Imprint: Be x Boy Comics
- Magazine: Magazine Be × Boy
- Original run: July 2013 – present
- Volumes: 9
- Anime television series
- Directed by: Naoyuki Tatsuwa
- Produced by: Tomoyo Kamiji; Narumi Odagiri; Miho Kikoshi; Yasushi Yoshida (Note: Unconfirmed romanization of 吉田靖.)
- Written by: Yoshimi Narita
- Music by: Masaru Yokoyama
- Studio: CloverWorks
- Licensed by: NA: Aniplex of America
- Original network: Tokyo MX, GTV, GYT, BS11, SUN, KBS
- Original run: October 5, 2018 – December 28, 2018
- Episodes: 13
- Anime film

Dakaichi: Spain Arc
- Directed by: Naoyuki Tatsuwa
- Produced by: Narumi Odagiri; Miho Kikoshi; Akihiro Sotokawa; Toshiki Tezuka
- Written by: Yoshimi Narita
- Music by: Masaru Yokoyama
- Studio: CloverWorks
- Licensed by: NA: Crunchyroll
- Released: October 9, 2021
- Runtime: 78 minutes

Dakaichi: I'm Being Harassed By the Sexiest Man of the Year (Japanese: 抱かれたい男1位に脅されています。, Hepburn: Dakaretai Otoko Ichi-i ni Odosarete Imasu.) is a Japanese manga series by Hashigo Sakurabi. It is serialized in the yaoi monthly magazine Magazine Be × Boy since July 2013 and has been collected in nine tankōbon volumes. An anime television series adaptation by CloverWorks aired from October to December 2018. An anime film adaptation of the manga's Spain Arc premiered in October 2021.

== Plot ==
Takato Saijō, an actor since childhood, has been recognized as the "sexiest man of the year" in the entertainment industry for five consecutive years. However, his first-place position has been usurped by Junta Azumaya, a young newcomer actor. While Takato firstly sees Junta as a rival, on the other hand, Junta admires Takato greatly and is in love with him.

== Characters ==
Takato Saijō (西條高人, Saijō Takato)
Voiced by: Hiroki Takahashi
Junta Azumaya (東谷准太, Azumaya Junta)
Voiced by: Yūki Ono
Chihiro Ayagi (綾木千広, Ayagi Chihiro)
Voiced by: Takuya Satō
Ryō Narumiya (成宮 涼, Narumiya Ryō)
Voiced by: Yuma Uchida
Kazuomi Usaka (卯坂和臣, Usaka Kazuomi)
Voiced by: Kohsuke Toriumi
Kiyotaka Arisu (在須清崇, Arisu Kiyotaka)
Voiced by: Wataru Hatano
Celes (セレス, Seresu)
Voiced by: Show Hayami
Antonio (アントニオ)
Voiced by: Fukushi Ochiai

== Media ==
=== Manga ===
Dakaichi: I'm Being Harassed By the Sexiest Man of the Year began serialization in Libre Publishing's yaoi monthly magazine Magazine Be × Boy since July 2013 and has been collected in nine tankōbon volumes as of September 2023. Digital manga publisher Futekiya announced in August 2021 that they had licensed the series for a digital release.

==== Volume list ====
No.	Original release date	Original ISBN	English release date	English ISBN
1	February 10, 2014	978-4799714430	November 27, 2021	—
Dakaichi: I'm Being Harassed By the Sexiest Man of the Year Chapter 1; Dakaichi: I'm Being Harassed By the Sexiest Man of the Year Chapter 2; Dakaichi: I'm Being Harassed By the Sexiest Man of the Year Chapter 3; A Loving Hand to the Lost God; Netorare Triangle; His Dom Switch♡; Summer Behind the School Building
2	March 10, 2015	978-4799725610	January 15, 2022	—
Dakaichi: I'm Being Harassed By the Sexiest Man of the Year Chapter 4; Dakaichi: I'm Being Harassed By the Sexiest Man of the Year Chapter 5; Dakaichi: I'm Being Harassed By the Sexiest Man of the Year Chapter 6; Dakaichi: I'm Being Harassed By the Sexiest Man of the Year Chapter 7; Dakaichi: I'm Being Harassed By the Sexiest Man of the Year Chapter 8; Netorare Triangle Chapter 2
3	December 1, 2016	978-4799730300	February 26, 2022	—
Dakaichi: I'm Being Harassed By the Sexiest Man of the Year PRELUDE Chapter 1; Dakaichi: I'm Being Harassed By the Sexiest Man of the Year PRELUDE Chapter 2; Dakaichi: I'm Being Harassed By the Sexiest Man of the Year PRELUDE Chapter 3; Dakaichi: I'm Being Harassed By the Sexiest Man of the Year PRELUDE Chapter 4; Dakaichi: I'm Being Harassed By the Sexiest Man of the Year PRELUDE Chapter 5; Netorare Triangle Chapter 3
4	March 31, 2017	978-4799732724	April 16, 2022	—
Dakaichi: I'm Being Harassed By the Sexiest Man of the Year - In Hawaii; Dakaichi: I'm Being Harassed By the Sexiest Man of the Year Chapter 9; Dakaichi: I'm Being Harassed By the Sexiest Man of the Year Chapter 10; Dakaichi: I'm Being Harassed By the Sexiest Man of the Year Chapter 11; Dakaichi: I'm Being Harassed By the Sexiest Man of the Year Chapter 12; Dakaichi: I'm Being Harassed By the Sexiest Man of the Year Chapter 13; Netorare Triangle Chapter 4
5	March 30, 2018	978-4799733516	June 11, 2022	—
Dakaichi: I'm Being Harassed By the Sexiest Man of the Year Chapter 14; Dakaichi: I'm Being Harassed By the Sexiest Man of the Year Chapter 15; Dakaichi: I'm Being Harassed By the Sexiest Man of the Year Chapter 16; Dakaichi: I'm Being Harassed By the Sexiest Man of the Year Chapter 17; Dakaichi: I'm Being Harassed By the Sexiest Man of the Year Chapter 18; Netorare Triangle Chapter 5
6	March 13, 2019	978-4799742150	July 23, 2022	—
Dakaichi: I'm Being Harassed By the Sexiest Man of the Year Chapter 19; Dakaichi: I'm Being Harassed By the Sexiest Man of the Year Chapter 20; Dakaichi: I'm Being Harassed By the Sexiest Man of the Year Chapter 21; Dakaichi: I'm Being Harassed By the Sexiest Man of the Year Chapter 22; Dakaichi: I'm Being Harassed By the Sexiest Man of the Year - Prologue
7	June 10, 2020	978-4799747063	September 3, 2022	—
Dakaichi: I'm Being Harassed By the Sexiest Man of the Year Chapter 23; Dakaichi: I'm Being Harassed By the Sexiest Man of the Year Chapter 24; Dakaichi: I'm Being Harassed By the Sexiest Man of the Year Chapter 25; Dakaichi: I'm Being Harassed By the Sexiest Man of the Year Chapter 26; Dakaichi: I'm Being Harassed By the Sexiest Man of the Year Chapter 27; Dakaichi: I'm Being Harassed By the Sexiest Man of the Year Chapter 28; Dakaichi: I'm Being Harassed By the Sexiest Man of the Year Chapter 29; Dakaichi: I'm Being Harassed By the Sexiest Man of the Year - On a Certain Night
8	September 18, 2021	978-4799754146	–	—
Dakaichi: I'm Being Harassed By the Sexiest Man of the Year Chapter 30; Dakaichi: I'm Being Harassed By the Sexiest Man of the Year Chapter 31; Dakaichi: I'm Being Harassed By the Sexiest Man of the Year Chapter 32; Dakaichi: I'm Being Harassed By the Sexiest Man of the Year Chapter 33; Dakaichi: I'm Being Harassed By the Sexiest Man of the Year Chapter 34
9	November 9, 2023	978-4-7997-6478-7	–	—
Dakaichi: I'm Being Harassed By the Sexiest Man of the Year Chapter 35; Dakaichi: I'm Being Harassed By the Sexiest Man of the Year Chapter 36; Dakaichi: I'm Being Harassed By the Sexiest Man of the Year - Usaka x Arisu Chapter 1; Dakaichi: I'm Being Harassed By the Sexiest Man of the Year - Usaka x Arisu Chapter 2; Dakaichi: I'm Being Harassed By the Sexiest Man of the Year - Usaka x Arisu Chapter 3; Dakaichi: I'm Being Harassed By the Sexiest Man of the Year Chapter 37

=== Anime ===
An anime television series adaptation aired from October 5 to December 28, 2018, on Tokyo MX. The series is animated by CloverWorks and directed by Naoyuki Tatsuwa, with Yoshimi Narita handling series composition, Minako Shiba designing the characters, Masaru Yokoyama composing the series' music, and Satoshi Motoyama as sound director. Minako Shiba is the chief animation director alongside Senri Kawaguchi and Yu Kurihara. The opening theme is "Fukanzen Monologue" by Tomohisa Sako. The ending theme is "Chuntaka!" by Yūki Ono and Hiroki Takahashi under their character names. Aniplex of America has licensed the series and streamed it on Crunchyroll. The series ran for 13 episodes.

==== Episode list ====
No.	Title (Note: All English episode titles are taken from Crunchyroll.)	Original release date
1	"In show business, it's either eat or be eaten." Transliteration: "Gennōkai wa kū ka kuwareru ka." (Japanese: 芸能界は喰うか喰われるか。)	October 5, 2018
2	"I guess he's already over me." Transliteration: "Aitsu, mō ore ni akiyagatta no ka." (Japanese: あいつ、もう俺に飽きやがったのか。)	October 12, 2018
3	"Molesting. Just don’t do it." Transliteration: "Chikan, dame, zettai." (Japanese: チカン、ダメ、ゼッタイ。)	October 19, 2018
4	"I've been framed..." Transliteration: "Hameraretā." (Japanese: ハメられたああぁぁ。)	October 26, 2018
5	"I can make you my woman." Transliteration: "Ore no onna ni shite agemasu yo." (Japanese: 俺の女にしてあげますよ。)	November 2, 2018
6	"Why am I at a hotel with him... Did we... There's no way... Is there!?" Transliteration: "Nande koitsu to hoteru de issho ni... masaka... iya iya iya nai yo na? Sonna... Son..." (Japanese: なんでコイツとホテルで一緒に...まさか...いやいやいやないよな？そんな...そん...。)	November 9, 2018
7	"Can I keep liking you?" Transliteration: "Suki de ite mo ii desu ka." (Japanese: 好きでいてもいいですか。)	November 16, 2018
8	"H-Hands off my swim trunks." Transliteration: "Zu, Zurasuna, umi pan zurasuna." (Japanese: ず、ずらすな、海パンずらすな。)	November 23, 2018
9	"...I guess you two are close." Transliteration: "...... Naka ga ii koto de." (Japanese: ......仲がいいことで。)	November 30, 2018
10	"We're breaking up, Chunta."; Transliteration: "Wakareruzo, Chunta." (Japanese: 別れるぞ、チュン太。)	December 7, 2018
11	"If you're that in love with me, you can have your way with me until you're done." Transliteration: "Sonna ni ore ni horeten nara, akiru made dakasete yaru yo." (Japanese: そんなに俺に惚れてんなら、飽きるまで抱かせてやるよ。)	December 14, 2018
12	"mi tesoro."	December 21, 2018
13	"fu-fu-fuuuun ♪"; Transliteration: "Fuffufu~n♪Fuffuffu~n♪Fuffuffu~Fufu~n" (Japanese: ふっふっふ〜ん♪ふっふっふ〜ん♪ふっふっふ〜ふふ〜ん)	December 28, 2018

==== Film ====
On April 19, 2021, it was announced that the series would be receiving an anime film adaptation which premiered on October 9, 2021. The film is centered around the manga's Spain Arc. The main staff and cast members returned to reprise their roles. The film was licensed for international streaming by Crunchyroll and released on the platform on November 8, 2024. Opening ??? by ???, ending ??? by ???

=== Stage plays ===
A theater adaptation of the in-story stage play "Kōyōki" (Autumn Leaf Demon), ran in the Club eX theater in Shinagawa Prince Hotel in Tokyo from June 28 to July 7, 2019. It was directed by Shingo Machida and written by Akira Kuzuki. A sequel to the theater production ran in Nippon Seinenkan Hall in Tokyo from January 8 to January 14, 2021. A third theater production ran in Theater 1010 in Tokyo from May 8 to May 15, 2022. It served as the finale for the theater adaptations.

=== Other adaptations ===
A Thai drama adaptation, titled Top Form, was released in 2025. The drama was produced by WeTV and Tailai Entertainment, starring "Boom" Raveewit Jirapongkanon as "Akin" (Takato) and "Smart" Chisanupong Paungmanee as "Jin" (Junta)

== Reception ==
By January 2020, the manga series sold a cumulative total of 3 million physical copies.
