= Bangkok Love Stories: Objects of Affection =

2019 Thai-language television series

- Genre: Drama
- Created by: Ekachai Uekrongtham
- Starring: Kanokchat Manyaton; Apinya Sakuljaroensuk
- Country of origin: Thailand
- Original language: Thai
- No. of seasons: 1
- No. of episodes: 13

Original release
- Network: GMM 25
- Release: February 14 – May 9, 2019

Bangkok Love Stories: Objects of Affection is a segment of the 2019 Thai-language television anthology series Bangkok Love Stories, created by Ekachai Uekrongtham and starring Kanokchat Manyaton and Apinya Sakuljaroensuk. The plot is set in Bangkok's Ratchada district and revolves around a troubled young woman witnessing two men murdering two women, and records it on her phone. Later, she meets a cell phone repairman who might help her fix more than just the phone.

The first episode was released on February 14, 2019 and the last on May 9, 2019 on GMM 25.

== Cast ==
- Kanokchat Manyaton as Qten
- Apinya Sakuljaroensuk as Jess
- Gyeon Seo as Tae-hee
- Nalin Hohler as Dada

== Release ==
Bangkok Love Stories: Objects of Affection was released between February 14, 2019 and May 9, 2019 on GMM 25.
