= Chaleeda Gilbert =

Thai-British singer

- Born: 21 February 2001 (age 25); Bangkok, Thailand
- Origin: Thailand
- Genres: Pop; R&B
- Occupations: Singer; actress; lyricist; MC; YouTubers
- Instruments: vocals
- Years active: 2017–present
- Label: Gushcloud

Chaleeda Gilbert (born 21 February 2001), known mononymously as Chaleeda (Thai: ชาลีดา), is a Thai singer, actress, lyricist, and YouTuber. She rose to fame in Malaysia as one of the contestants in season two of Big Stage, a Malaysian reality television show produced by Astro.

== Career ==
She started her music career at the age of 11, became a member of the Thai girl group Tweenie 90', and began posting cover songs on YouTube, one of which was Justin Bieber's "Love Yourself", which garnered over 1.2 million views within five days.

In 2017, she signed a contract with Malaysian talent management company Rocketfuel Entertainment as one of their new artists, making Gilbert the first international artist to sign with Rocketfuel.

She then released her debut single under the label, the Thai-language "Ready For Love", featuring Thai rapper Twopee. It amassed over 1.5 million views on YouTube.

Gilbert made her acting debut in the 2017 Thai horror film The Promise. Her first mini concert, Chaleeda Showcase, was held at The Bee, Publika, on December 14.

In April 2018, she released "Pretty Boy" as her third single, co-written by Kuizz and Bil Musa. The music video has over one million views on YouTube.

In April 2021, after more than a year of musical inactivity, she released her first song written by her, titled "cigarettes", and two months later she released her second song written by her, titled "caught up".

=== Big Stage Season 2 ===
Gilbert participated in a Malaysian reality show, Big Stage Season 2, which aired on Astro Ria. Along with Syada Amzah, she was eliminated in week 5, and in week 8 among contestants who stepped up in the sixth week.

Performance:
Week	Theme	Song	Original Artist	Result
Week 1	N/A	"Pretty Boy"	Herself	SAFE
Week 2	Hype Beat	"Havana"	Camila Cabello & Young Thug	SAFE
Week 3	Glocal Hits	"Buat Selamanya"	Alif	SAFE
Week 4	Duominasi	"Rewrite the Stars" (with Luqman Faiz)	James Arthur & Anne-Marie	SAFE
Week 5	Cannot Brain	"Girlfriend"	Avril Lavigne	ELIMINATED

== Personal life ==
Gilbert is of Thai and British descent. Apart from her native Thai, she also fluent in English and Malay. She divides her time between Bangkok and Kuala Lumpur.

Gilbert cites Drake, Rihanna, August Alsina, and Melanie Martinez as her idols.

== Discography ==
Singles
Title	Year
"Ready For Love" (ft. Twopee)	2017
"Mind Over Matter" (ft. SonaOne)	2017
"Pretty Boy"	2018
"Growing Up Sucks"	2019
"Rasa Begitu"	2019
"ปล่อย (Ploi)" ("Let Over")	2019
"ฉันไม่ต้องการเธอ (Chun Mai Tong Karn Tur)" (ft. Fiixd)	2020
"Cigarettes"	2021
"Caught up"	2021

== Filmography ==
Year	Title	Role	Notes
2017	The Promise	Taew	Debut feature film
2019	The Stranded	Arisa	Netflix series
2019	Big Stage (Season 2)	Herself	Malaysian reality TV show
2021	Ghost Lab	Gib	Netflix movie

=== Television ===
- 2022 Pleng Bin Bai Ngiw (2022) (CHANGE2561/Amarin TV) as Jieab (Jomthong's sister)

=== Series ===
- 2019 The Stranded เคว้ง (/Netflix) as Arisa (อริสา)
- 2022 Club Friday The Series Love Seasons Celebration Ep. Broken Anniversary (The One Enterprise-CHANGE2561/One 31) as
- 2022 The Warp Effect (The One Enterprise-GMMTV/GMM 25) as Khim with Phuwin Tangsakyuen

== Concerts ==
- Chaleeda Showcase (2017)
