= Beautiful Boxer =

- Promotional release poster
- Directed by: Ekachai Uekrongtham
- Written by: Desmond Sim; Ekachai Uekrongtham
- Produced by: Ekachai Uekrongtham
- Starring: Asanee Suwan; Sorapong Chatree
- Cinematography: Choochart Nantitanyatada
- Edited by: Dusanee Puinongpho
- Music by: Amornbhong Methakunavudh
- Distributed by: GMM Pictures; Regent Releasing (US); TLA Releasing
- Release dates: November 28, 2003 (Thailand); February 7, 2004 (Berlin)
- Running time: 118 minutes
- Country: Thailand
- Languages: Thai; English; Japanese

Beautiful Boxer (Thai: บิวตี้ฟูล บ๊อกเซอร์) is a 2003 Thai biographical sports film produced, directed and co-written by Ekachai Uekrongtham. It tells the life story of Parinya Charoenphol (a.k.a. Nong Toom), a famous kathoey, Muay Thai fighter, actress and model. Charoenphol was portrayed by male kickboxer Asanee Suwan.

== Cast ==
- Asanee Suwan as Nong Toom / Parinya Charoenphol
- Sorapong Chatree as Pi Chart
- Orn-Anong Panyawong as Parinya Charoenphol's mother
- Nukkid Boonthong as Parinya Charoenphol's father
- Sitiporn Niyom as Nat
- Kyoko Inoue as herself (female Japanese wrestler)
- Sarawuth Tangchit as Parinya Charoenphol (as a child)
- Keagan Kang as Jack the reporter

== Reception ==
On review aggregator website Rotten Tomatoes, the film has an approval rating of 81% based on 36 critics. The website's critical consensus reads: "Beautiful Boxer blends boxing and identity politics to create a striking, if overdrawn, portrait of self discovery."

There was controversy in Thailand about the full frontal nudity in this film. For the Thai release, the nudity was cut.

The movie was highlighted in the book Movies and Mental Illness: Using Films to Understand Psychopathology as an example of films focusing on gender dysphoria.

== Awards and nominations ==
Won

- Torino International Gay & Lesbian Film Festival – Best Feature Film
- Thailand National Film Association Awards – Best Actor (Asanee Suwan), Best Makeup (Kraisorn Sampethchareon)
- San Sebastián International Film Festival – Sebastian Award
- Milan International Lesbian and Gay Film Festival – Best Film
- Outfest – Achievement Award – Outstanding Emerging Talent (Ekachai Uekrongtham)

Nominated

- GLAAD Media Awards – Outstanding Film

== See also ==
- List of boxing films
