= Visava Thaiyanont =

Thai actor and singer

Tomo Visava Thaiyanont
- วิศว ไทยานนท์
- Born: June 7, 1990 (age 35); Bangkok, Thailand
- Other name: Tomo (โทโมะ)
- Occupations: Actor, singer
- Years active: 2007-present
- Notable work: Bad Romance: The Series Together With Me: The Series Together With Me: The Next Chapter

Visava Thaiyanont (Thai: วิศว ไทยานนท์; born on June 7, 1990), better known by his nickname Tomo (โทโมะ), is a Thai Japanese actor and former member of Thai pop band K-Otic from the company RS Limited.

== Biography ==
Tomo was born in Bangkok, Thailand to a Japanese mother and Thai father, he has one older sister and one older brother.

Tomo attended Niva International School in Bangkok, Thailand. Tomo's major in university was business and he graduated from Bangkok University International College in 2015. Tomo is trilingual, he lived in the U.S. for 8 years. He can speak English, Japanese and Thai. Some of his hobbies include basketball, breakdancing and beatboxing.

== Filmography ==
=== Dramas ===
Year	Title	Character
2015	Sing Rak Thalu Miti (ซิ่งรักทะลุมิติ)	Sinday
2016	Bad Friends: The Series	Toshi
2016	Bad Romance: The Series	Cho
2018	Together With Me: The Next Chapter	Cho
2018	Saneha Stories	

=== Films ===
Year	Title	Character
2011	Bangkok Kung Fu	Kaa/Ga
2017	Let's Go Bangkok Holiday (愛尚泰國)	豪直

=== TV shows ===
Year	Title	Notes
2009	Kamikaze Club	
2011	K-OTIC Real	
2013	KAMIKAZE	
2016	Morning News (ยกทัพข่าวเช้า)	Guest along with Maengmum Pimnitchakun Bumrungkit where they showed Bad Romance behind the scenes
2016	Morning News (ยกทัพข่าวเช้า)	Guest along with Bad Romance actors Max Nattapol, Tul Pakorn and Maengmum Pimnitchakun Bumrungkit
2016	Celebrities (สำรับคนดัง)	Guest with Maengmum (Ep. 118)

== Discography ==
=== Studio albums ===
- K-Otic (2007)
- Blacklist (2008)
- Free To Play (2010)
- Real (2011)

=== Compilations ===
- Kamikaze: Khat Chai (2007)
- Kamikaze: Forward To You (2008)
- Kamikaze: Friendship Never Ends (2009)
- Kamikaze: Kamikaze Wave (2010)
- Kamikaze: Lover Project (2010)

=== Singles ===
- Ya Wai Chai (2007)
- Ying Ham Ying Rak (2007)
- Rak Mai Dai Rue Mai Dai Rak (2007)
- My Girl (2007)
- Freestyle (2008)
- Blacklist (2008)
- Faen Mai (2008)
- Rai Tae Rak (2008)
- Rai Diang Sa (2008)
- Nio Koi (Jongbae) (2008)
- Free To Play (2009)
- Ngao Pak (2010)
- Rueang Khong Rao (Ya Bok Khao Loei) (2010)
- Thing Khao Sa(2011)
- Mi Mee Tur Mi Yak Hai Chi (2011)
- Pur Wan Prung Nee (2011)

=== Concerts ===
- Kamikaze Live Concert (2009)
- Kamikaze Wave Concert (2010)
- Kamikaze Lover Concert (2011)

== Awards ==
- 2008: Seventeen Magazine's Choice Rising Star as a Group
- 2009: KAZZ Magazine Award – Best Group
- 2009: POP Music Award – Best Idol
- 2009: POP Music Award – Song of the Year
- 2009: POP Music Award – POP Download – KAMIKAZE – Puean Gun Chun Ruk Tur
- 2011: SEED Awards – Best MV 'Alone'
