= Bangkok Love Stories: Innocence =

2018 Thai-language television series

- Genre: Romance comedy
- Created by: Ekachai Uekrongtham
- Written by: Ekachai Uekrongtham
- Directed by: Suttasit Dechintaranarak
- Starring: Narupornkamol Chaisang; Ten Tosatid Darnkhuntod; Max Nattapol Diloknawarit
- Country of origin: Thailand
- Original language: Thai
- No. of seasons: 1
- No. of episodes: 13

Production
- Running time: 46 minutes

Original release
- Network: GMM 25
- Release: March 8 – November 14, 2018

Bangkok Love Stories: Innocence is a 2018 segment of the Thai-language television anthology series Bangkok Love Stories, created by Ekachai Uekrongtham and starring Narupornkamol Chaisang, Ten Tosatid Darnkhuntod and Max Nattapol Diloknawarit. The plot is set in Bangkok’s dense, urban Silom district and revolves around a group of characters finding romance.

The first episode was released on March 8, 2018 and the last on November 14, 2018 on GMM 25.

== Cast ==
- Narupornkamol Chaisang as Eve
- Ponlawit Ketprapakorn as Danny
- Pavadee Komchokpaisan as Lyn
- Tosatid Darnkhuntod as Simon
- Max Nattapol Diloknawarit as Keaton
- Nicole Theriault as Jennista
- Tachakorn Boonlupyanun as Mednoon
- Rudklao Amratisha as the mother of Simon
- Naphon Phromsuwan as the doctor
- Teera Pratumtree as Toffy
- Nida Patcharaveerapong as Claudia
- Kawin Manonukul as JC
- Srikarn Lukgal Nakavisut as Jam
- Radarat Jitprasertngam as Jin (AKA KFC girl)
- Ataporn Suwan as the policeman

== Release ==
Bangkok Love Stories: Innocence was released between March 8, 2018 and February 11, 2018 on GMM 25.
