= Ekachai Uekrongtham =

Thai theatre and film director

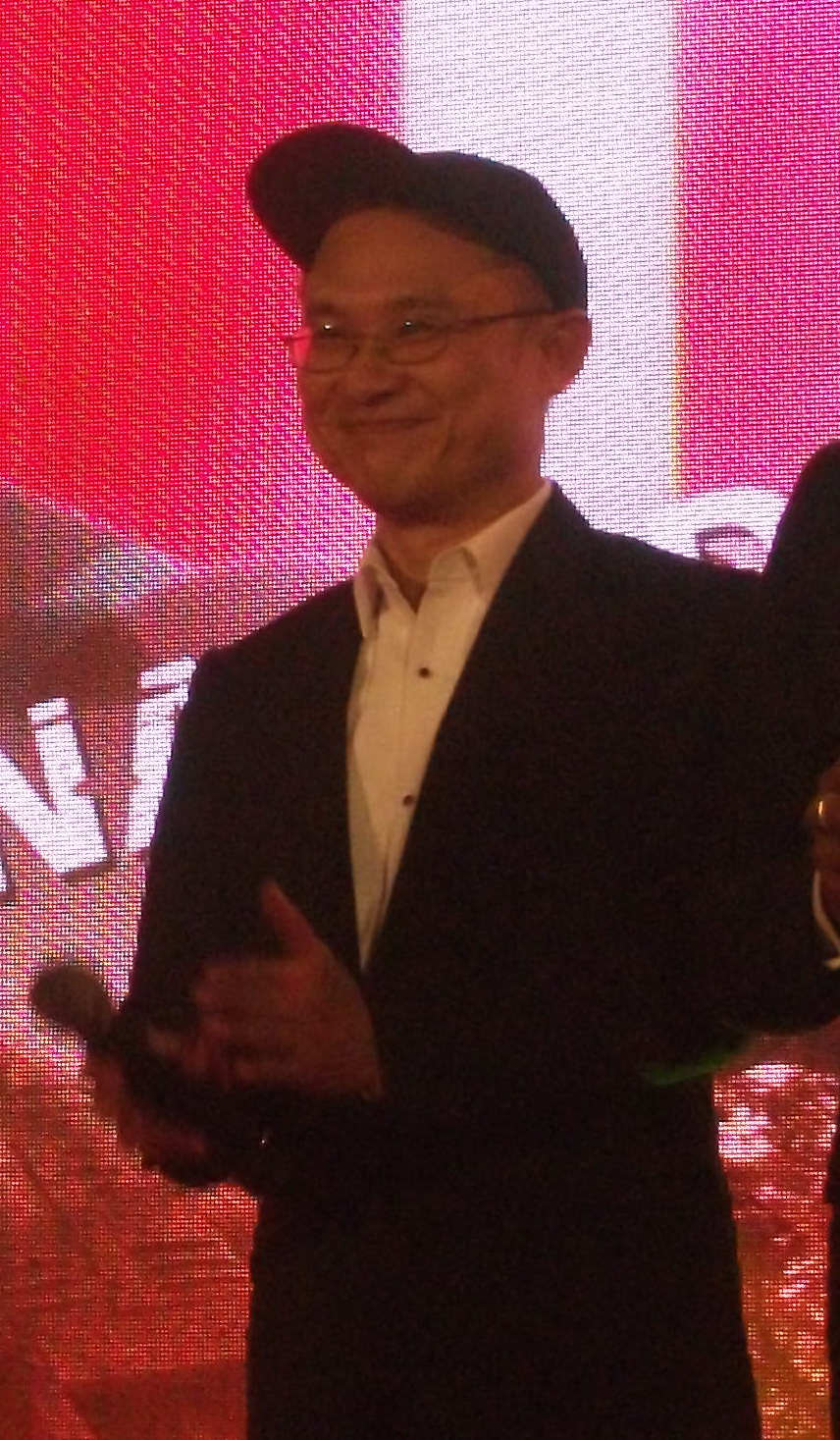
Ekachai Uekrongtham at press conference of Skin Trade.

Ekachai Uekrongtham (Thai: เอกชัย เอื้อครองธรรม; RTGS: Ekkachai Uea-khrongtham; Chinese: 呂翼謀) is a Thai theatre and film director. Based in Singapore, Ekachai is the founding artistic director of ACTION Theatre, a Singapore professional theatre company.

Among his stage works is Chang & Eng, a musical based on Chang and Eng Bunker, the original "Siamese twins". His other stage works include Corporate Animals - The Musical, Ka-Ra-you-OK?, Viva Viagra!, Autumn Tomyam, Mail Order Brides & Other Oriental Takeaways and Confessions of Three Unmarried Women.

He made his debut as a feature-film director in 2003 with Beautiful Boxer, a biographical drama about transsexual professional Muay Thai boxer, Nong Thoom. His second film, Pleasure Factory, about sex workers and their customers in Singapore's Geylang red-light district, was an official selection of the Cannes Film Festival in 2007. His third film, The Coffin, starring Ananda Everingham, opened in Thai theaters on August 21, 2008.

In 2014, he directed the Dolph Lundgren action drama on human trafficking Skin Trade (2015), also starring Tony Jaa and Ron Perlman, shot in Bangkok and Vancouver.

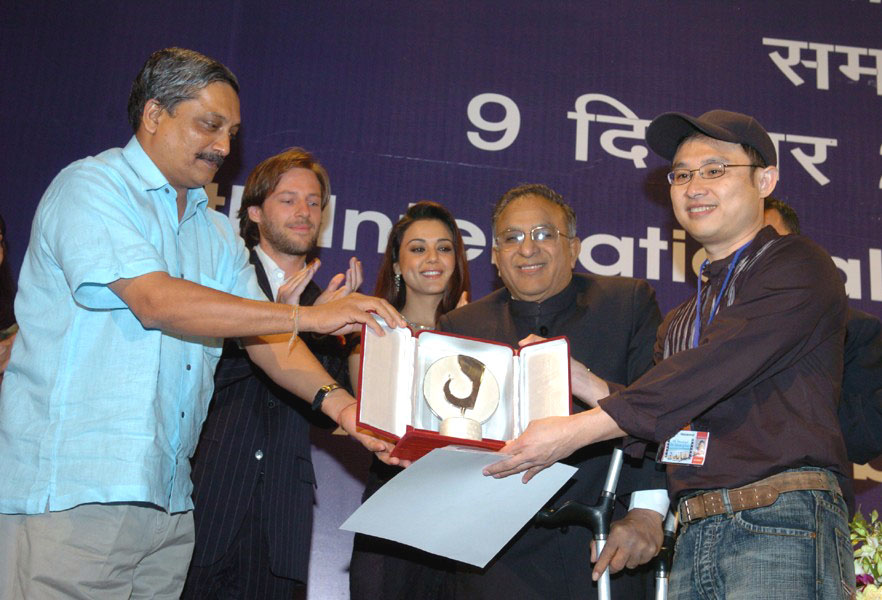
Ekachai Uekrongthan receiving Silver Peacock Award for his film Beautiful Boxer, at IFFI (2004)

== Filmography ==
- 1991: The Nose (short film) – director, writer and producer
- 2004: Beautiful Boxer – director, writer and producer
- 2007: Pleasure Factory - director, writer and producer
- 2008: The Coffin - director
- 2009: The Wedding Game - director and writer
- 2015: Skin Trade - director

== Selected plays ==
- 1995: Corporate Animals - director
- 1998: Ka-Ra-you-OK? – director
- 1999: The Swimming Instructor - director
- 2000: Viva Viagra! - director
- 2000: Chang & Eng - director
- 2001: Autumn Tomyam - director
- 2005: The Admiral's Odyssey - producer
- 2006: Confessions of 300 Unmarried Men - producer and artistic director
- 2007: Everything But The Brain - producer and artistic director
- 2007: The Swimming Instructor - producer
- 2007: Postcards from Rosa - producer and artistic director
- 2007: Hitting (On) Women - producer
- 2007: Real Men, Fake Orgasms - producer
- 2011: Boxing Boys - director
