= The Face Men Thailand =

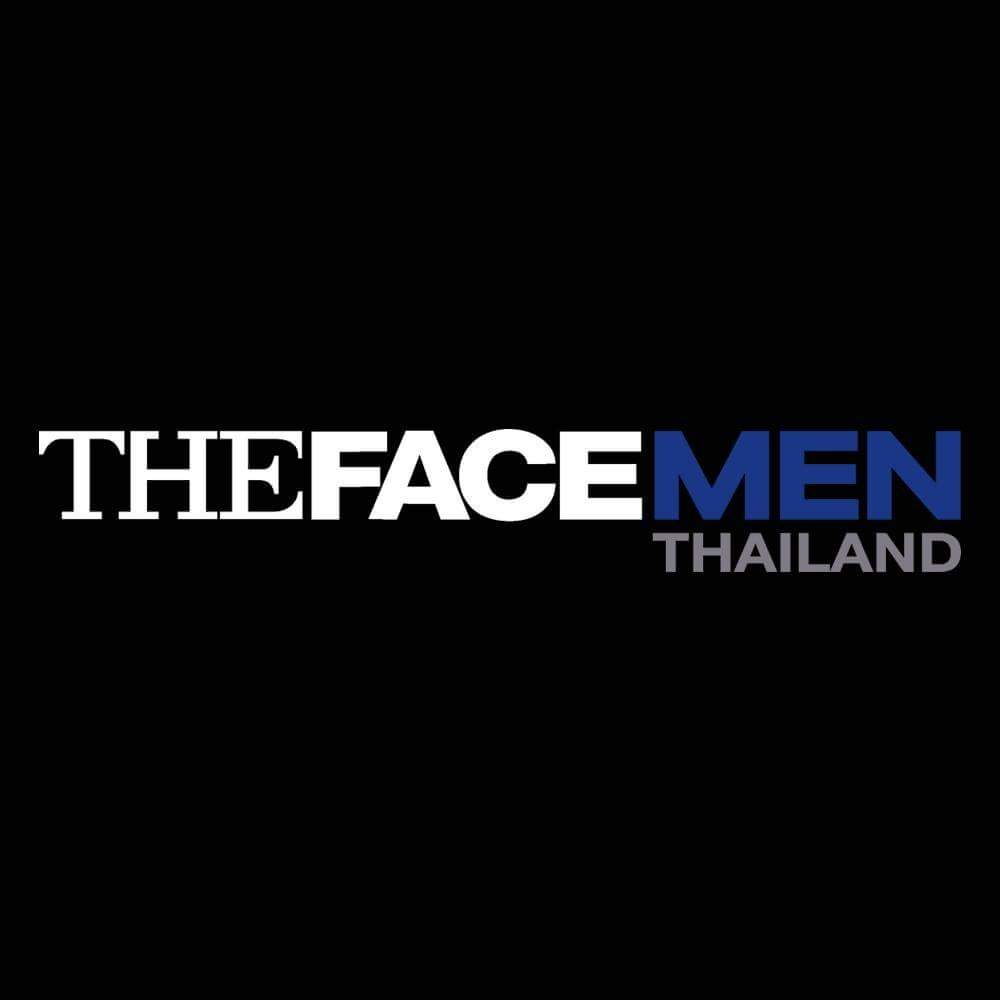
- Genre: Competition
- Presented by: Former: Sabina Meisinger (1); Antoine Pinto (2–3); Thitisan Goodburn (4)
- Judges: Former: Lukkade Metinee (1); Peach Pachara (1); Moo Asava (1–2); Sonia Couling (2); Toni Rakkaen (2); Akhamsiri Suwanasuk (3); Jirayu La-ongmanee (3); Araya Indra (3); Sabina Meisinger (3); Pancake Khemanit (4); Jumpol Adulkittiporn (4); Phakphum Romsaithong (4); Ananda Everingham (4)
- Country of origin: Thailand
- Original languages: Thai; English
- No. of seasons: 4
- No. of episodes: 33

Production
- Executive producer: Piyarat Kaljareuk
- Production location: The Face Thailand Studio (1–4)
- Running time: 105 minutes (excluding commercials)

Original release
- Network: Channel 3 (1,4); PPTV HD 36 (2); LINE TV (2–3); Thairath TV (3); Netflix (4)
- Release: 29 July 2017 – present

Related
- The Face; The Face Thailand

The Face Men Thailand (also known as The Face Men) is an international Thai reality television modeling competition for males. The series air on Channel 3 since 2017 in Thailand.

At first the executive producer announced on his Instagram they will open casting for Thai and any nationality. Auditions for the show began on 30 April 2017 in F.A.C.E International Festival at Muangthai Gym Live House at CentralWorld, Bangkok. Aspiring contestants were required to be no older than 29 years of age, and meet a minimum height requirement of 175 cm (5 ft 9 in). The season premiered on 29 July 2017 on Channel 33HD.

In 2018, the second season open casting calls for male models in South East Asia countries Under the cooperation of MWD Documentary and Kantana Group, such as Myanmar, Cambodia and Vietnam. First casting began in Yangon, Myanmar on 9 June 2018. The winner of audition and runners-up will go to Bangkok, Thailand for get a chance to casting again with Thai and international male models. Audition in Thailand was on 11 August 2018 at Kantana studio, Bangkok.

Season 2 press conference was on September 24, 2018 at Siam Paragon executive producer announced they will have the very first new role for the show as Master Mentor. Every eliminated contestant will be transferred into team Master Mentor. They will be able to attend Master Class, but can't do Campaign. The season premiered on 7 October 2018 on PPTV HD 36.

== Hosts and Mentors ==
Master Mentor	Seasons			
Master Mentor	1	2	3	4
Lukkade Metinee		✔		
Chalermchatri Yukol				✔
Mentors	Seasons			
Mentors	1	2	3	4
Moo Asava	✔			
Lukkade Metinee	✔			
Peach Pachara	✔			
Sonia Couling		✔		
Toni Rakkaen		✔		
Akhamsiri Suwanasuk			✔	
Jirayu La-ongmanee			✔	
Araya Indra			✔	
Sabina Meisinger			✔	
Pancake Khemanit				✔
Jumpol Adulkittiporn				✔
Phakphum Romsaithong				✔
Ananda Everingham				✔
Hosts	Seasons			
Hosts	1	2	3	4
Sabina Meisinger	✔			
Antoine Pinto		✔		
Thitisan Goodburn				✔

== Seasons ==
Season	Premiere date	Winner	Runners-up	Other contestants in order of elimination	Number of contestants
1	29 July 2017	Philip Thinroj	Attila Gagnaux; Man Soranun	Bas Buaphakham, Dui Kanthasai, Gun Phanwong, Bank Sangnimnuan, Niki Boontham & PK Vanasirikul & Thime Pichitsurakij, Jack Su, Kun Tansuhas, Gunn Saengvanich & Mos Priabyodying & Mickey Na Pombhejara & Sam Boonhor, Joseph Angelo & Third Yoovichit	18
2	7 October 2018	Luis Meza	Kim Goodburn; Poppy Anomakiti; Ryota Ohmi	Ruj Mitwatthana, Pon Charungphokhakon, Best Phanthakoengamon & Dom Petchthamrongchai & Golf Suphromin & Paul de Bodt, Kim Bohman, Mooyong Bunsomsuk, Andy Harris & Kat-chan Hada & Bom Thanawatyanyong & Film Uengwanit & Bank Heamtan & William Aherne	18
3	5 October 2019	Boss Darayon	CGame Wichaikum; Thony Blane; Timmy Sanner	Best Phanthakoengamon, Kim Goodburn, Film Uengwanit, Jybb Maha-Udomporn, Marcos Alexandre Jr., Bom Thanawatyanyong & Greg de Bodt & Peak Rattanapet & Paul de Bodt	13
4	7 March 2026	Pom Kamonpop	Kimhan, Peem & Gluf	Kimhan, Lincoln Bui, Donut, P.P., Wigrom, Rome, Fox, Mew Neng, Bonus, Pom, Peem, Manyoo, Jacob Ferraioli, Leo Lee & Gluf	15

Mentor's color symbols

Team Lukkade (Season 1)
Team Moo (Season 1–2)
Team Peach (Season 1)
Team Sonia (Season 2)
Team Toni (Season 2)
Team Kao (Season 3)
Team Jakjaan (Season 3)
Team Art and Sabina (Season 3)
Team Pancake and Ananda (Season 4)
Team Off (Season 4)
Team Mile (Season 4)

== Thai representatives at Face of Asia ==
=== Face of Thailand ===
contestant who appointed as Face of Thailand to represent Thailand in Face of Asia contest at Asia Model Festival

Year	Contestant	Province	Placement	Special awards
(South Korea) 2018	Trisanu Soranun	Bangkok	Unplaced	OnDay Cosmetics Award
(South Korea) 2018	Pasakorn Vanasirikul	Bangkok	Unplaced	Best Relationship

== See also ==
- The Face Thailand
