= Pachara Chirathivat =

Thai actor and singer (born 1993)

- พชร จิราธิวัฒน์
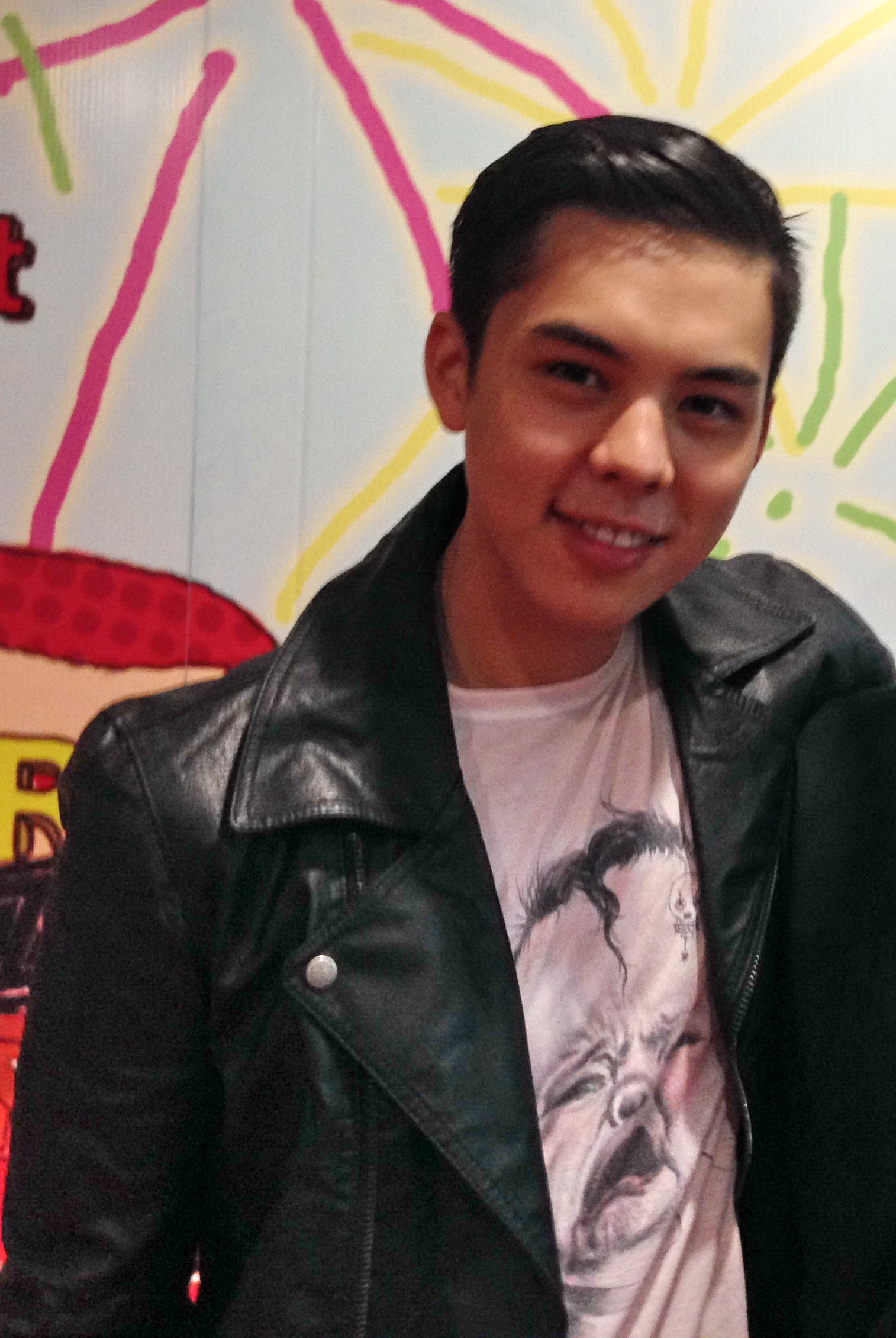
- Chirathivat at VERY TV festival
- Born: 10 May 1993 (age 33); Bangkok, Thailand
- Other names: Peach; Pachara Marcel Chirathivat
- Education: Commerce and Accountancy Chulalongkorn University
- Occupations: Actor; singer
- Years active: 2011–present
- Agents: Nadao Bangkok (2011–2015); SPICY DISC; Channel 3 (2015–2022)
- Known for: The Billionaire; SuckSeed; Hormones: The Series

Pachara Chirathivat (Thai: พชร จิราธิวัฒน์, RTGS: Phachara Chirathiwat; pronounced [pʰátɕʰaráʔ tɕìrāːtʰíwát], born 10 May 1993), also known as Peach, is a Thai actor and singer. He is best known for his lead roles in the 2011 films SuckSeed and The Billionaire. He is currently working with Channel 3, and is also one of the main leads in the teen drama Hormones: The Series, playing the role of Win. Pachara also plays music with his indie band named Rooftop, and engages in philanthropy with patients in hospitals. He is a member of the Chirathivat family, and graduated from Chulalongkorn University.

== Biography ==
=== Early life and education ===
Pachara Chirathivat was born on 10 May 1993 in Bangkok, Thailand, to Thirayuth and Chanadda Chirathivat of the Chirathivat family (who founded the family-owned Central Group). He has two siblings, Khemmanat Chirathivat and Pimpisa Chirathivat. He attended Chulalongkorn University Demonstration School and finished Business Administration at The Chulalongkorn Business School, Faculty of Commerce and Accountancy, Chulalongkorn University in 2015. He also studied in England.

=== Acting career ===
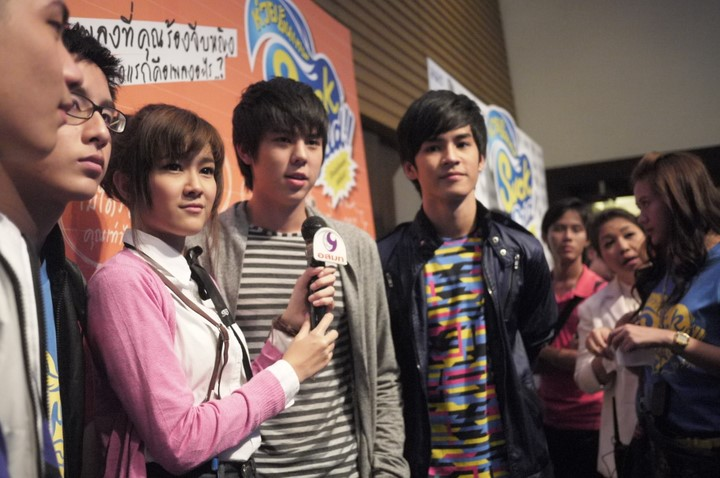
Chirathivat (middle) with the cast of SuckSeed at a promotional event on 15 February 2011.

Chirathivat marked his acting debut in SuckSeed, a 2011 comedy film that focuses on music. Directed by first-time feature director Chayanop Boonprakob, the film was a success both at the box office and with critics. It also received The Laugh Category Uminchu Prize Grand Prix at the 4th Okinawa International Movie Festival. Following the film's success, he was cast in Songyos Sugmakanan's biographical film The Billionaire in the same year, playing young entrepreneur Itthipat Kulapongvanich's character. Since he was accustomed to having other lead actors with him in SuckSeed, he had a hard time acting multiple scenes on his own at first. He was seen carrying heavy sacks of nuts on his shoulders, for example, in which he thought the scene was very brutal. His buttocks were accidentally bruised during a shoot as well. With the help of the director, he later managed to overcome his stress and he was proud to be a part of the film.

The next year, he joined the cast of thriller film Countdown, playing the character, Jack. Although he shared some attributes of Jack, such as studying abroad and being a rebel, he changed completely (with the way he talked, dressed, walked, and lived) to get into character. He also had to learn martial arts to avoid injuries during their action scenes. In one scene where Jack is strangled, however, Chirathivat was actually being suffocated; he tried to tell the crew to stop strangling him because he could not breathe, but they thought he was just acting. The film was shortlisted as the Thai entry for the Best Foreign Language Film at the 86th Academy Awards.

After working with Sugmakanan in the 2011 film The Billionaire, the director cast Chirathivat as one of the main leads in GTH's TV series Hormones. Breaking the mould of Thai television, which typically features Thai soap operas and sitcoms, Hormones seeks to explore and portray various aspects and issues of adolescent life. These include topics normally considered taboo for open discussion in Thai society, such as teenage sex and school violence. Just like the other main cast members, Chirathivat's character and personality in the series were based on the combination of his own experiences and the crew's research on contemporary adolescent issues. He played the character of Win, the most popular boy at school who later fell into the world of drugs, discothèque and night life. He felt very lucky to be part of the series, stating: "I have learned the lives of the characters through their many experiences, incidents that I have never seen in my life." Although originally planned for only one season, its popularity and reception prompted Hormones to have a total of three seasons. Including Chirathivat, the original cast members reprised their roles for the second season and returned as guest stars for the last season.

In 2015, he moved from GMM Tai Hub to Channel 3, stating that he wanted to get more experience and develop himself more as an actor. He later mentored in the first season of The Face Men Thailand.

In 2024, he can be seen in Thai crime drama The Believers available worldwide on Netflix.

=== Music career ===
Besides acting Chirathivat is also into making music, particularly electronic and rock music. After his stint in SuckSeed, He has had his own rock band named Rooftop, under the indie music label Smallroom. He once worked together with K-pop star Nichkhun for a brand. In 2015, he collaborated with musician and producer Pakorn "Beam" Musikaboonlert and formed a new rock band, White Rose. The band's name was inspired by a non-violent resistance group of students from a University in Munich during the Nazi Germany in 1941. Their single "Dear You" was produced by the French indie band Tahiti 80.

Chirathivat writes most of the lyrics in his songs. He stated: "I feel most comfortable singing my own lyrics. If you sing your own song, nobody else can do it better than you." Besides singing, he also plays the keyboards and guitar.

=== Philanthropy ===
In 2014, he provided support for a 12-year-old boy named Mon, who was diagnosed with terminal brain cancer. Chirathivat initially got a call from the Make-A-Wish Foundation to grant Mon's dying wish of meeting him in person. Mon expressed admiration towards Chirathivat ever since he watched SuckSeed. In return, Chirathivat continued to provide support for Mon. He stated: "I never thought I'd be such an influence like this on people... When we have a good life, a good job and good health, we should share our happiness with others. I tell myself I have to do best every day, because we never know what might happen." In celebration of his birthday every year, he also occasionally donates medical equipment at the Chulalongkorn Hospital for the patients.

== Personal life ==
At age 20, Chirathivat was ordained as a Buddhist monk for three weeks as is the custom in Thailand.

In early 2015, Chirathivat submitted a request to defer military enlistment for academic reasons. The next year, he again filed a waiver due to acting commitments. He is stated to be aware that conscription in Thailand is unavoidable, and mentioned he is fine serving his countrymen.

Chirathivat left the family’s retail business after graduating university. Although, he started to run the local franchise of Philippine-based fast food chain, Potato Corner.

Pachara had a relationship with singer Note Panayanggool for three years but broke up. He had a relationship with actress Patricia Good of Channel 3, which ended due to personal differences. Later, he was involved with model Minnie Lin.

== Discography ==
=== Singles ===
- "ซักซี๊ดนึง", 2011 (SuckSeed OST)
- "มีแต่เธอ", 2011 (SuckSeed OST)
- "พรุ่งนี้รวย", 2011 (The Billionaire OST)
- "ทุ้มอยู่ในใจ" เวอร์ชัน อูคูเลเล่, 2012
- "ต่อยอดความท้าทาย", 2012 (with Nichkhun)
- "ฉันมีเพียง" ("White Rose"), 2014 (Hormones OST)
- "Free Fall", 2014 (White Rose first single)
- "Sunya Thee Mai Jing" ("Dear You"), 2015

=== Music videos ===
Year	Song Title
2011	"ซักซี้ดนึง"
2011	"ทุ้มอยู่ในใจ"
2011	"พรุ่งนี้รวย"

== Filmography ==
=== Films ===
Year	Title	Role	Notes
2011	SuckSeed	Koong / Kay	Debut film
2011	The Billionaire	Itthipat Kulapongvanich (Tob)	
2012	Seven Something	Himself	Guest
2012	Band Next Door		Short film
2012	Countdown	Jack	
2013	SuckSeed GTH Side Stories	Koong / Kay	Short film
2014	Find Someone Special	New	Short film
2017	The Moment	Ton	
2018	Bikeman	Sakkarin / "Sak"	
2019	Bikeman 2	Sakkarin / "Sak"	
2022	Jai Fu Story	Diao	
2022	OMG! Oh My Girl	Pete	
2023	E-Sarn Zombie	Itt	

=== TV series ===
Year	Title	Role	Network	Notes
2012	Muad Opas The Series - Season 2	Edward	Modernine TV	Cameo
2013	My Melody 360 Ongsa Rak	Win	Modernine TV	
2013–2015	Hormones: The Series	Chaichana Charatchaipracha (Win)	GMM One, GMM 25, One 31	Season 1-2 (Main), Season 3 (Guest)
2016	Raeng Tawan	Wisut	Channel 3	Supporting
2018	Sanae Rak Nang Sin	Pakawat "Wat"	Channel 3	Main
2018	Kharm See Tan Dorn	Duan	Channel 3	Supporting
2022	The Deadly Affair; Pitsawart Karta Game	Pattarapong Wongthara (Pat)	Channel 3	Cameo
2022	The Root; Rakkaew	Ripdin Nawarat (Din)	Channel 3	Main
2023	Faceless Love	Chanon	GMMTV	Supporting
2023	Curse Code	Ek	Amazon Prime	Main
2024	The Believers	Game	Netflix	Main
2024	Thicha	Phatchai	One 31 / Netflix	Main
2025	Mad Unicorn	Ken	Netflix	Main
2025	The Believers season 2	Game	Netflix	Main

=== TV shows ===
Year	Title	Network	Notes
2015	Frozen Hormones	GMM One, LINE TV	Himself, regular member
2017	The Face Men Thailand season 1	Channel 3	Mentor
2017	The Face Thailand season 3	Channel 3	Guest (Ep. 9)
2018	The Face Thailand season 4	Channel 3	Guest (Ep. 13)

== Accolades ==
Year	Ceremony	Category	Work	Result
2011	21st Suphannahong National Film Awards	Best Supporting Actor	SuckSeed	Nominated
2011	9th Starpics Thai Film Awards	Best Supporting Actor	SuckSeed	Nominated
2012	20th Bangkok Critics Assembly Awards	Best Supporting Actor	SuckSeed	Nominated
2012	20th Bangkok Critics Assembly Awards	Best Actor	The Billionaire	Nominated
2012	9th Kom Chad Luek Awards	Best Supporting Actor in Film	SuckSeed	Nominated
2012	9th Kom Chad Luek Awards	Best Actor in Film	The Billionaire	Nominated
2012	Siamdara Stars Awards 2012	Best Male Lead Actor	The Billionaire	Won
2013	Ganesha Awards	Most Outstanding Youth as Role Model	—N/a	Won
2015	Kazz Awards 2015	รางวัลศิลปินสุดแนวแห่งปี ได้แก่	—N/a	Won
2023	31st Suphannahong National Film Awards	Best Supporting Actor	OMG! Oh My Girl	Won
2023	12th Thai Film Director Awards	Best Supporting Actor	OMG! Oh My Girl	Nominated
