= The Face Men Thailand season 2 =

The Face Men Thailand
- Season 2
- Promotional poster
- No. of episodes: 10

Release
- Original network: PPTV HD 36; LINE TV
- Original release: 7 October – 9 December 2018

Season chronology
- ← Previous; Season 1 Next → Season 3

The Face Men Thailand Season 2 began audition on 9 June 2018 in Yangon, Myanmar and 11 August 2018 at Kantana studio, Bangkok, Thailand. Lukkade Metinee returned as Master Mentor, the very first new role for the show. Moo Asava was reprised his roles as mentor again. Sonia Couling, one of The Face Thailand All Stars's mentor, and Toni Rakkaen were the new mentors in this season. Antoine Pinto, a Muay Thai Kickboxer, served as host. The season premiered on 7 October 2018.

== Auditions ==
=== Myanmar Audition ===
First casting began in Yangon, Myanmar on 9 June 2018 under “The Face Men Thailand Season 2 Myanmar Audition" with Piyarat Kaljareuk (Vice President of Kantana Group & Executive Producer The Face Thailand) and Sonia Couling as judges. The winner of the audition and runners-up will go to Bangkok, Thailand to get a chance to audition again with Thai and international male models.

- Winner - Wai Zin "Hernfah"
- 1st Runner Up - Zin Bo Chan
- 2nd Runner Up - Myat Min San

=== Thailand Audition ===
Casting calls for Thai and any nationality will be held in Bangkok, Thailand at Kantana Studio Ratchada on Saturday 11 August 2018. Aspiring contestants were required to be between 13 and no older than 29 years of age, and meet a minimum height requirement of 175 cm (5 ft 9 in).

== Contestants ==
(ages stated are at the start of shooting)

| Contestant | Age | Height | Hometown | Model coach | Master Mentor | Finish | Rank |
|---|---|---|---|---|---|---|---|
| Nirut "Ruj" Mitwatthana (Asharaf Alikan) | 28 | 1.83 m (6 ft 0 in) | | Sonia | Lukkade | Episode 3 | 18 |
| Yingphon "Pon" Charungphokhakon | 20 | 1.80 m (5 ft 11 in) | | Moo | Lukkade | Episode 4 | 17 |
| Jirat "Golf" Suphromin | 26 | 1.78 m (5 ft 10 in) | | Sonia | Lukkade | Episode 6 | 16–13 |
| Dom Petchthamrongchai | 15 | 1.82 m (5 ft 11 1/2 in) | Melbourne, Australia | Toni^{1} | Lukkade | Episode 6 | 16–13 |
| Bordinded "Best" Phanthakoengamon | 17 | 1.92 m (6 ft 3 1/2 in) | Bangkok | Toni | Lukkade | Episode 6 | 16–13 |
| Pierre Paul de Bodt | 22 | 1.85 m (6 ft 1 in) | Brussels, Belgium | Moo | Lukkade | Episode 6 | 16–13 |
| Philip "Kim" Bohman | 29 | 1.80 m (5 ft 11 in) | Stockholm, Sweden | Sonia | Lukkade | Episode 7 | 12 |
| Bancha "Mooyong" Bunsomsuk | 27 | 1.80 m (5 ft 11 in) | | Toni | Lukkade | Episode 8 | 11 |
| William Henry Aherne | 24 | 1.85 m (6 ft 1 in) | London, United Kingdom | Toni | Lukkade | Episode 9 | 10–5 |
| Mondop "Bank" Heamtan | 19 | 1.76 m (5 ft 9 1/2 in) | Chanthaburi | Toni | none | Episode 9 | 10–5 |
| Kazuhito "Kat-chan" Hada | 23 | 1.81 m (5 ft 11 1/2 in) | | Sonia | none | Episode 9 | 10–5 |
| Andy Harris | 23 | 1.83 m (6 ft 0 in) | Singapore | Sonia | none | Episode 9 | 10–5 |
| Jirayu "Film" Uengwanit | 22 | 1.82 m (5 ft 11 1/2 in) | Bangkok | Moo | none | Episode 9 | 10–5 |
| Nonthat "Bom" Thanawatyanyong | 26 | 1.80 m (5 ft 11 in) | Bangkok | Moo | none | Episode 9 | 10–5 |
| Ratchaphong "Poppy" Anomakiti | 24 | 1.76 m (5 ft 9 1/2 in) | Bangkok | Moo^{3} | none | Episode 10 | 4–2 |
| Thitisan "Kim" Goodburn | 19 | 1.80 m (5 ft 11 in) | Bangkok | Moo | none | Episode 10 | 4–2 |
| Ryota Ohmi | 30 | 1.83 m (6 ft 0 in) | Tokyo, Japan | Toni | none | Episode 10 | 4–2 |
| Luis Meza | 23 | 1.85 m (6 ft 1 in) | Los Angeles, United States | Sonia^{2} | none | Episode 10 | 1 |

- The contestant was originally eliminated in episode 3-8 but returned to the competition by transferred into team master mentor, able to attend Master Class, but can't do Campaign.

== Episodes ==
=== Episode 1 : Casting ===
First aired 7 October 2018

- Team Moo : Poppy, Bom, Film, Pon, Paul and Kim G.
- Team Sonia : Luis, Kat-chan, Ruj, Kim B., Andy and Golf
- Team Toni : Best, William, Mooyong, Dom, Bank and Ryota

=== Episode 2 : Equality By Wonjin ===
First aired 14 October 2018

- Winning coach and team: Toni Rakkaen
- Bottom two: Pon Charungphokhakon and Kim Bohman
- Eliminated: None
- Special guest: Victor Pinto, Sophida Kanchanarin & Gene Kasidit
- Featured photographer: Nat Prakobsantisuk

=== Episode 3 : Huawei Nova 3i Selfie Revolution ===
First aired 21 October 2018

- Winning coach and team: Toni Rakkaen
- Bottom two: Bom Thanawatyanyong and Ruj Mitwatthana
- Eliminated: Ruj Mitwatthana

=== Episode 4 : The Next Level of Clean with Comfort ===
First aired 28 October 2018

- Winning coach and team: Sonia Couling
- Bottom two: Pon Charungphokhakon and Best Phanthakoengamon
- Eliminated: Pon Charungphokhakon
- Featured photographer: Punsiri Siriwetchapun

=== Episode 5 : The Destiny with Huawei Nova 3i ===
First aired 4 November 2018

- Winning coach and team: Moo Asava
- Bottom two: William Aherne and Golf Suphromin
- Eliminated: William Aherne
- Special mentor: Chermarn Boonyasak
- Special guest: Korawan Lodsantia, Chayada Visuttipranee & Peemsinee Sawangkla

=== Episode 6 : Extraordinary Journeys with Bangkok Airways ===
First aired 11 November 2018

- Winning coach and team: Moo Asava
- Bottom four: Golf Suphromin, Dom Petchthamrongchai, Best Phanthakoengamon and Paul de Bodt
- Eliminated by Master Mentor: Golf Suphromin, Dom Petchthamrongchai, Best Phanthakoengamon and Paul de Bodt^{6}
- Special guest: Kanachai Bencharongkul
- Featured photographer: Nat Sumontemee

=== Episode 7 : Preface of Final Walk ===
First aired 18 November 2018

- Winning coach and team: Moo Asava
- Bottom two: Ryota Omi and Kim Bohman
- Eliminated: Kim Bohman
- Special guest: Cindy Bishop & Sombatsara Thirasaroj

=== Episode 8 : Chasing The Sense of Perfume You Can Wear ===
First aired 25 November 2018

- Returned in original team: William Aherne
- Winning coach and team: Moo Asava
- Bottom two: Mooyong Bunsomsuk and Kat-chan Hada
- Eliminated: Mooyong Bunsomsuk
- Special guest: Praya Lundberg

=== Episode 9 : Accelerate Together with Toyota C–HR Adidas ===
First aired 2 December 2018

- Winning coach and team: Moo Asava
- Winning campaign: Kim Goodburn
- Final three was chosen by Coach: Luis Meza, Ryota Omi & Poppy Anomakiti
- Fourth was chosen by coach from winning campaign team: Kim Goodburn
- Eliminated: Kat-chan Hada, Andy Harris, Film Uengwanit, Bom Thanawatyanyong, Bank Heamtan & William Aherne
- Special mentor: Pitt Karchai
- Special guest: Arthur Apichaht Gagnaux

=== Episode 10 : Final Walk ===
First aired 9 December 2018

- Final four: Luis Meza, Poppy Anomakiti, Kim Goodburn & Ryota Omi
- Winning campaign: Luis Meza
- The Face Men Thailand: Luis Meza
- Winning coach and team: Sonia Couling

== Summaries ==
=== Elimination Table ===
| Team Moo | Team Sonia | Team Toni | Team Master Lukkade (Challenge time only) |

| Contestant | Episodes | | | | | | | | | | | |
| Contestant | 1 | 2 | 3 | 4 | 5 | 6 | 7 | 8 | | 9 | 10 | |
|---|---|---|---|---|---|---|---|---|---|---|---|---|
| Challenge Winner | —N/a | Best | Luis | Bank | Ruj | Poppy | William | Luis | | Golf | —N/a | |
| Luis | IN | IN | IN | WIN | IN | IN | IN | IN | IN | LOW | WIN | WINNER |
| Kim G. | IN | IN | IN | IN | WIN | WIN | WIN | IN | WIN | WIN | IN | RUNNER-UP |
| Poppy | IN | IN | IN | IN | WIN | WIN | WIN | IN | WIN | WIN | LOW | RUNNER-UP |
| Ryota | IN | WIN | WIN | IN | IN | IN | LOW | IN | IN | LOW | LOW | RUNNER-UP |
| Bom | IN | IN | LOW | IN | WIN | WIN | WIN | IN | WIN | OUT | | |
| Film | IN | IN | IN | IN | WIN | WIN | WIN | IN | WIN | OUT | | |
| Andy | IN | IN | IN | WIN | IN | IN | IN | IN | IN | OUT | | |
| Kat-chan | IN | IN | IN | WIN | IN | IN | IN | IN | LOW | OUT | | |
| Bank | IN | WIN | WIN | IN | IN | IN | IN | IN | IN | OUT | | |
| Mooyong | IN | WIN | WIN | IN | IN | IN | IN | IN | OUT | RET | | |
| Kim B. | IN | LOW | IN | WIN | IN | IN | OUT | RET | | | | |
| Paul | IN | IN | IN | IN | WIN | OUT | JOIN | RET | | | | |
| Best | IN | WIN | WIN | LOW | IN | OUT | JOIN | RET | | | | |
| Dom | IN | WIN | WIN | IN | IN | OUT | JOIN | RET | | | | |
| Golf | IN | IN | IN | WIN | LOW | OUT | JOIN | RET | | | | |
| William | IN | WIN | WIN | IN | OUT | RET | JOIN | RET | IN | OUT | | |
| Pon | IN | LOW | IN | OUT | RET | | JOIN | RET | | | | |
| Ruj | IN | IN | OUT | RET | | | JOIN | RET | | | | |

The contestant was part of the winning team for the episode.
The contestant was at risk of elimination.
The contestant was eliminated from the competition.
The contestant was eliminated from the competition by master mentor.
The contestant was part of the winning team for the episode, but eliminated from the competition by master mentor.
The contestant was originally eliminated but returned to the competition by transferred into team master mentor, able to attend Master Class, but can't do Campaign.
The contestant was originally eliminated but returned to the competition by transferred into team master mentor, able to attend Master Class and invited as guest in Campaign.
The contestant was originally eliminated but returned to the competition by transferred into team master mentor, able to attend Master Class, and returned to the competition in original team by master mentor
The contestant was a Runner-Up.
The contestant won The Face Men.

- Episode 1 was the casting episode. The final eighteen were divided into individual teams of six as they were selected.
- In episode 2, team Toni won the campaign. Moo nominated Pon while Sonia nominated Kim B. for the elimination. Toni didn't eliminate both of them.
- In episode 5, Mentor Sonia can not to do campaign, But Ploy Chermarn take on the role Sonia Couling.
- From episodes 3–9, Every eliminated contestant will be transferred into team master Lukkade. They will be able to attend Master Class, but can't do Campaign.
- In episode 6, team Moo won the campaign. Sonia nominated Golf, Toni nominated Dom and Best while Moo nominated Paul for eilimination. Master Lukkade eliminated all of them.
- In episode 8, William returned to the competition in original team by master mentor
- In episode 9, Pitt Karchai replaced Toni who was occupied by his event, but after the campaign, Toni was back to the elimination process as Team Toni's mentor. After that, Kim G. won the campaign individually, automatically advancing into the finale. Sonia, Toni and Moo were allowed to choose any one contestant to advance into the finale from the remaining ten models. Sonia chose Luis, Toni chose Ryota, and Moo chose Poppy. Kat-chan, Andy, Film, Bom, Bank and William were eliminated.
- In episode 10, Luis won the campaign individually, however there was no elimination so all contestants were put through to the final runway.

=== Campaigns ===
- Episode 1: First Impression, Runway and Self Administered 'Transformations' (Casting)
- Episode 2: Equality by Wonjin
- Episode 3: Huawei Nova 3i Selfie Revolution
- Episode 4: The Next Level of Clean with Comfort
- Episode 5: The Destiny with Huawei Nova 3i
- Episode 6: Extraordinary Journeys with Bangkok Airways
- Episode 7: Preface of Final Walk
- Episode 8: Chasing The Sense of Perfume You Can Wear
- Episode 9: Accelerate Together with Toyota C–HR Adidas
- Episode 10: Acting and Final Walk

== Notes ==
1. Dom was selected by master mentor and 3 mentors but master Lukkade selected him into team Toni.
2. Luis didn't get selected by 3 mentors but master Lukkade selected him into team Sonia.
3. Poppy was selected by master mentor, mentor Sonia and Moo, but master Lukkade selected him into team Moo.
