= The Face Men Thailand season 4 =

2026 television reality show season

The Face Men Thailand
- Season 4
- No. of episodes: 8

Release
- Original network: Channel 3 Netflix
- Original release: 7 March 2026 – present

Season chronology
- ← Previous; Season 3

The Face Men Thailand season 4 is the 4th season of the Thai competitive reality television series The Face Men. It premiered on March 7, 2026, on Channel 3 and Netflix in Thailand. A reality show to find the best models and actors.

Season 4 included new Mentors Pancake Khemanit, Off Jumpol, Mile Phakphum and Ananda Everingham. Thai film and television series director Chalermchatri Yukol participates as the season's Master Mentor.

== Contestants ==
(ages stated are at start of filming)

Contestant	Nickname	Age	Model coach	Finish	Rank
Patchubun Panjamapirom	Wigrom	17	Pancake and Ananda	Episode 2	15
Poramet Manyuen	Fox	25	Off	Episode 3	14
Pattanaphong Phattanakaphun	P.P.	20	Pancake and Ananda	Episode 4	13-12
Jacob Ferraioli	Jacob	21	Mile	Episode 4	13-12
Travis Anye Neng	Mew	18	Off	Episode 5	11
Lincoln Bui	Lincoln	26	Pancake and Ananda	Episode 6	10-8
Monnat Unchanasopin	Donut	25	Pancake and Ananda	Episode 6	10-8
Lee Heesung	Leo	30	Mile	Episode 6	10-8
Sitthirak Kaewniyom	Manyoo	20	Mile	Episode 7	7-5
Siwapong Phanthumchinda	Rome	26	Off	Episode 7	7-5
Nathapas Vongvaravipatr	Bonus	24	Off	Episode 7	7-5
Thanapong Prapasirisulee	Gluf	16	Mile	Episode 8	4
Nathapat Prabhananda	Peem	22	Mile	Episode 8	3-2
Ronnakorn Camchoo	Kimhan	23	Pancake and Ananda	Episode 8	3-2
Kamonpop Kaewdiao	Pom	25	Off	Episode 8	1

== Episodes ==
=== Episode 1: Audition Awakening ===
First aired 7 March 2026

- Team Pancake and Ananda: Kimhan, Lincoln, Donut, P.P., Wigrom^{*}
- Team Off: Rome, Fox, Mew, Bonus, Pom^{*}
- Team Mile: Peem, Manyoo, Jacob, Leo, Gluf^{*}

=== Episode 2: Rooftop Park Runway ===
First aired 14 March 2026

- Winning coach and team: Off
- Bottom two: Wigrom and Gluf
- Eliminated: Wigrom
- Special Mentor: Jingjing Yu
- Special guest: Polpat Asavaprapha

=== Episode 3: Underwater Fashion Video ===
First aired 21 March 2026

- Winning coach and team: Pancake and Ananda
- Winner of the campaign: Kimhan
- Bottom two: Fox and Manyoo
- Eliminated: Fox
- Special Mentor: Archen Aydin
- Special guest: Krit Amnuaydechkorn

=== Episode 4: Runway on Dining Table ===
First aired 28 March 2026

- Winning coach and team: Off
- Winner of the campaign: Bonus
- Popular vote winner: Mew
- Bottom two: P.P. and Jacob
- Eliminated: P.P. and Jacob
- Special Mentor: Apichet Atilattana
- Special guest: Cindy Bishop, Utt Panichkul

=== Episode 5: The Guardians Valor ===
First aired 4 April 2026

- Winning coach and team: Pancake and Ananda
- Winner of the campaign: Kimhan
- Bottom two: Mew and Gluf
- Eliminated: Mew
- Special Mentor: Jespipat Tilapornputt (Jes), Wichapas Sumettikul (Bible),Tawan Vihokratana (Tay)
- Special guest: Cindy Bishop,Anntonia Porsild

=== Episode 6: Drive The Runway ===
First aired 11 April 2026

- Winning coach and team: Off
- Bottom Three: Donut, Lincoln and Leo
- Eliminated: Donut, Lincoln and Leo
- Special guest: Jetsadapipat Tilapornpat,Cindy Bishop, Piyarat Kaljaruek,Suppasit Jongcheveevat, Pakorn Thanasriwanichchai

=== Episode 7: Up Up Clear Away ===
First aired 18 April 2026

- Winning coach and team:Team Mile
- Final three was chosen by Coach: Kimhan, Pom, Peem
- Fourth was chosen by coach from winning campaign team: Gluf
- Eliminated: Rome, Bonus and Manyoo
- Special guest: Paris Intarakomalyasut, Sinjai Plengpanich,Timethai, Ajirapha Maisinger

=== Episode 8: Final walk ===
First aired 25 April 2026

- Winner of the campaign: Kimhan and Peem
- Eliminated: Gluf
- Final three: Kimhan, Pom, Peem
- Popular vote Sponsored By ShopeeVIP: Rome

The Face Men Thailand: Pom Kamonphop Kaewdiao

- Winning coach and team: Off Jumpol Adulkittiporn
- Special guest: Mike Angelo, Paween Phurijitpanya, Cindy Bishop, Chloe Akrima Hardsevengle, Byron Bishop, Leila Bishop,Ann Thongprasom

== Summaries ==
=== Elimination table ===
Team Pancake & Ananda	Team Off	Team Mile

Contestant	Episodes								
Contestant	1	2	3	4	5	6	7	8	
Challenge Winner	—N/a	Leo, Rome	Pom	Mew, Pom	Kimhan	Rome	Peem	—N/a	
Pom	SAVED	WIN	IN	WIN	IN	WIN	LOW	IN	WINNER
Kimhan	IN	IN	WIN	IN	WIN	IN	IN	WIN	RUNNER-UP
Peem	IN	IN	IN	IN	IN	IN	LOW	WIN	RUNNER-UP
Gluf	SAVED	LOW	IN	IN	LOW	IN	WIN	OUT	
Rome	IN	WIN	IN	WIN	IN	WIN	OUT		
Bonus	IN	WIN	IN	WIN	IN	WIN	OUT		
Manyoo	IN	IN	LOW	IN	IN	IN	OUT		
Lincoln	IN	IN	WIN	IN	WIN	OUT			
Donut	IN	IN	WIN	IN	WIN	OUT			
Leo	IN	IN	IN	IN	IN	OUT			
Mew	IN	WIN	IN	WIN	OUT				
Jacob	IN	IN	IN	OUT					
P.P.	IN	IN	WIN	OUT					
Fox	IN	WIN	OUT						
Wigrom	SAVED	OUT							

The contestant was part of the winning team for the episode.
The contestant won the campaign for the episode and was part of the winning team for the episode.
The contestant won the campaign for the episode with other contestant and was same part of the winning team for the episode.
The contestant won the campaign for the episode with contestant of other team.
The contestant won the popular vote from the audience and was part of the winning team for the episode, was immune from the elimination, and earned the right to save a contestant who was at risk of elimination.
The contestant was at risk of elimination.
The contestant was eliminated from the competition.
The contestant was originally eliminated in first round audition but was saved by Master Mentor.
The contestant was a Runner-Up.
The contestant won The Face Men.

- Episode 1 TBA
- Episode 2 TBA

=== Campaigns ===
- Episode 1: TBA
- Episode 2: The Creative Cloud Canvas

== Notes ==
1. * Pom, Wigrom, and Gluf were originally eliminated in first round audition but The Master Mentor chose Wigrom for Team Pancake and Ananda, Gluf for Team Mile, and Pom for Team Off.
