= Thitisan Goodburn =

Thai model and pageant titleholder

- ธิติสรรค์ กู้ดเบิร์น
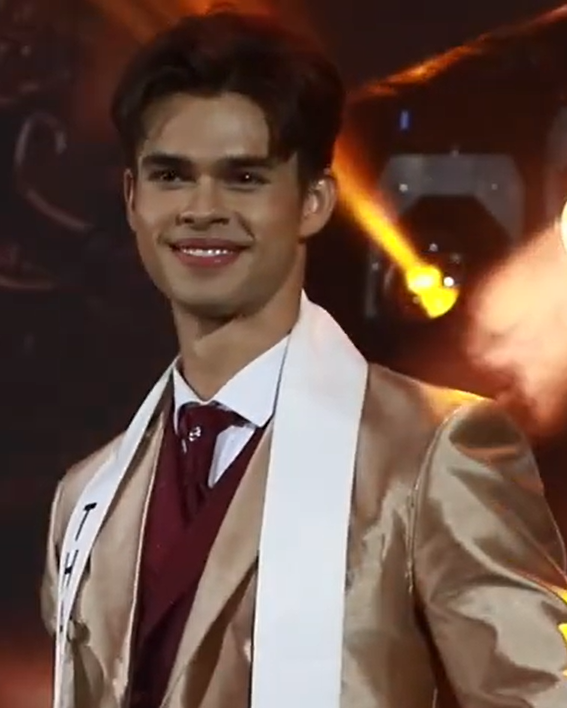
- Goodburn in 2023
- Born: 30 June 1999 (age 27); Bangkok, Thailand
- Other name: Kim Goodburn
- Education: Mahidol University (BE)
- Occupation: Actor
- Height: 1.80 m (5 ft 11 in)
- Beauty pageant titleholder
- Title: Mister International Thailand 2023; Mister International 2023
- Major competitions: Mister International Thailand 2023; (Winner); Mister International 2023; (Winner)

Thitisan Goodburn (Thai: ธิติสรรค์ กู้ดเบิร์น; born 30 June 1999), nicknamed Kim, is a Thai actor and male pageant titleholder who was crowned Mister International 2023. Thitisan began his career in 2018, as a contestant on season two of the Thai male modeling competition series The Face Men Thailand, where he was a runner-up. He returned the following year for season three, but was the second contestant to be eliminated.

In 2023, Thitisan began competing in male pageantry, and was crowned Mister International Thailand 2023 and later Mister International 2023, becoming the first Thai entrant to win Mister International.

== Early life and education ==
Thitisan was born on 30 June 1999 in Bangkok to an English father and a Thai mother. He was educated at Bangkok Prep, an independent, coeducational international school, graduating in 2017. Thitisan later attended Mahidol University, where he graduated with a degree in computer engineering. In his youth, Thitisan was also a rugby player, captaining the Thailand national student rugby team and also playing for the Thailand under-18 national rugby team.

== Career ==
Thitisan began his modeling career in 2018, after becoming a contestant on season two of the Thai male modeling competition series The Face Men Thailand. During the competition, he was on the team of Thai fashion designer Polpat Asavaprapha, and went on to advance to the show's finale, where he placed as a runner-up. Thitisan later returned to the competition the following year for season three, this time on the team of Araya Indra and Ajirapa Meisinger. He ultimately was eliminated in episode four, becoming the second contestant to be eliminated from the competition. After his elimination from the competition, Thitisan began a career as an actor and model in Thailand, appearing in films and television series.

=== Mister International 2023 ===
In 2023, Thitisan began his career in male pageantry after being crowned Mister International Thailand 2023. As Mister International Thailand, Thitisan was selected to compete as the Thai representative at the Mister International 2023 pageant in September 2023. During the competition, he went on to advance to the top five and was crowned the winner, becoming the first entrant from Thailand to win Mister International.

As of September 2024, Kim, during his reign as Mister International 2023, apart from his home country Thailand, has visited the Philippines, Vietnam, Cambodia, Nepal, the Maldives, Bhutan, Taiwan, India, Indonesia, and South Korea for various events, primarily as a member of jury for beauty pageants.

== Filmography ==
=== Film ===
Year	Title	Role
2020	Love You Khok I Keng	Mark

=== Television ===
Year	Title	Role	Network
2021	Dong Phaya Yen	Mok	One 31
2022	Deception	Jess	Channel 3 SD
2022	Mor Lam Bodyguard	Don	One 31
2023	Golden Sticky Rice	Village Head	One 31
2023	Concrete Forest Flowers	Vigor	One 31
2023	Love Miracle	Jeff	PPTV
2023	I Feel You Linger in the Air	Mr. James	One 31
2025	Echoes of the Lost City	Pha Wiang	
2025	Roller Coaster	Lamp	
2025	Let Me into Your Heart	Win	
