= Artit Ching Duang =

- Genre: Lakorn
- Created by: Exact Co., Ltd.
- Written by: Anajin
- Directed by: Puiphon Jansiri
- Starring: Sinjai Plengpanich; Phiyada Akkraseranee; Nat Devahastin na Ayudhaya
- Opening theme: "Live My Life In Solitude" by Watiya Ruaynirat
- Ending theme: "The Only Thing Is Your Heart" by Sine Fahrenheit
- Country of origin: Thailand
- Original language: Thai
- No. of episodes: 28

Production
- Producer: Thakonkiat Weerawan
- Running time: 45 minutes

Original release
- Network: Royal Thai Army Radio and Television Channel 5
- Release: January 26 – March 12, 2009

Artit Ching Duang (Thai: อาทิตย์ชิงดวง; RTGS: Athit Ching Duang) or known in English as "The Feuding Sun" is a Thai lakorn produced by Exact Co., Ltd. and aired on Royal Thai Army Radio and Television Channel 5 from January to March 2009.

This TV series airs every weekday nights from Mondays to Thursdays at 20:25 hrs Indochina Time (8:25 pm local).

The drama starred Sinjai Plengpanich, Phiyada Akkraseranee and Nat Devahastin na Ayudhaya, among others to name a few.

== Synopsis ==
Sinjai Plengpanich takes on the role of Panrawi, a woman trying to maintain her station in life. She is married to the wealthy Rangsi Soriyathit played by Pisarn Akkraseranee (Aom's biological father in real life and in this lakorn).

Rangsi and Panrawi have no biological children together, but they do have one adopted son named Passakorn (Nat Devahastin na Ayudhaya). Rangsi does have a biological child with another woman as a result of his extramarital/out of wedlock affair named Rangrong played by Aom Piyada.

In addition, Rangsi did not know of her existence until she was grown.

Rangrong is a feisty young woman out for revenge on Panrawi, the woman who harmed her mother, and also who snatched her father away from her, as well as to claim her inheritance back, which is Rangsi's.

Rangrong ended up not really being the biological daughter of Rangsi. What happened in the parents' younger years, Panrawi did not want anyone to take Rangsi away from her because she really loved him. Rangsi fell for this woman that played a traditional Thai musical instrument at an occasion he attended when they were in their younger years. Unexpectedly, Rangsi ends up getting her pregnant out of wedlock. Rangsi and Panrawi got married but this other woman which he kept in Rangsi's picture made Panrawi mad.

Later, Panrawi takes this woman to an abortion center. So, The lakorn goes on with Rangrong being the victim until a DNA result proves that she is really not a member of Rangsi's family.

Rangrong makes a fake will forcing Rangsi to sign everything to her. After he signs, she then kills him.

Panrawi does all that she can to take care of Rangrong but they were just equally tough. The bad that Panrawi had done in her past came back to her and now she is faced with Rangrong, who was taught by Fang to get revenge for her and to take over everything that really belongs to them. Rangrong had a hard time believing it too that she was not Fang's child but still went on with her evil life since she had nothing to lose anymore. Rangrong's real mother ended up crazy the day her newborn was snatched from her.

So, Panrawi came in the contact with this woman by accident and does all that she can to determine if Rangrong was hers. Panrawi almost succeeds until Rangrong killed her own mother by dropping her in the water. Rangrong does all this horrible things in order to seek her revenge for the past mistake that her parents made, making Panrawi the main victim.

In the end, Rangrong commits suicide to wash away the sins she committed right after she was caught by the police.

Finally the soap opera ends where Panrawi is seen reminding the viewers a moral lesson whereby in doing good deeds, the good will come in return, but if one does bad then the bad things will come out as retribution or the consequences of the wrongdoings or sins that a person commits.

== Cast ==
- Sinjai Plengpanich as Panrawi Suriyathit
- Phiyada Akkraseranee as Rangrong Suriyathit
- Pisarn Akkraseranee† as Rangsi Suriyathit
- Nat Thephussadin Na Ayutthaya as Phatsakon (Neung)
- Akhamsiri Suwanasuk as Fahroong
- Anuwat Niwatwong as Chot
- Pop Kamkasem as Phiangsun
- Waraporn Nguithrakul as Napha
- Panadda Komaladat as Nueang
- Konkrit Yuthiyong as Praweet
- Arunwadee Chantae as Ting

=== Supporting ===
- Namthip Jongrachatawiboon as Young Panrawi
- Phutanate Hongmanop as Young Rangsi
- Pitchaya Srithep as Young Saengla
- Phimkhae Kunjara na Ayudhaya as Phiangphon
- Surattana Khongtrakun as Saengla
- Wasitthi Silofung as Khampaeng

== International broadcast ==
- Artit Ching Duang was previously aired in Malaysia's TV3 channel in mid-2010 entitled "Striving For A Sun," which airs every weekday afternoons from Mondays to Thursdays at 3:00 pm MYT.
- It aired in Vietnam on the TodayTV VTC7 TV channel in 2011 and was entitled "Vượt qua bóng tối".
- In a different Vietnamese dub of the drama, entitled "Dòng máu cuối cùng", some characters have different Vietnamese names, for example, Saenglaa is Lệ Nga, Rangrong as Thiên Nhũ, Rangsee is Ran Sĩ, and Parnrawee is Nguyệt Phan.
