= Mister International 2023 (Thailand) =

15th edition of Mister International (Thailand)

- Date: September 17, 2023
- Venue: Crystal Design Center Ballroom, Khwaeng Khlong Chan, Bangkok, Thailand
- Broadcaster: YouTube; Facebook
- Entrants: 36
- Placements: 20
- Debuts: Guinea-Bissau; Northern Cyprus; Trinidad and Tobago
- Withdrawals: Albania; Cambodia; Hong Kong; Kazakhstan; Netherlands; Nicaragua; Panama; Sierra Leone
- Returns: Canada; Colombia; Lebanon; Nigeria; The Bahamas; Vietnam
- Winner: Thitisan Goodburn; Thailand
- Congeniality: Prajwol Tamrakar, Nepal
- Best National Costume: Thitisan Goodburn, Thailand
- Photogenic: Borxa Ramo Ruiz, Spain

Mister International 2023 was the 15th Mister International competition, held at the Crystal Design Center Ballroom, Khwaeng Khlong Chan in Bangkok, Thailand, on September 17, 2023.

This pageant was organized by the Thailand-based Mister International Organization, in parallel of the Mister International 2023 pageant in Baguio of the Philippine-based organization, which claims to be the legitimate organizer of the pageant. Emmanuel Franco of the Dominican Republic crowned Kim Thitisan Goodburn of Thailand as his successor at the end of the event. This is the first time that Thailand won Mister International.

== Background ==
=== Selection of participants ===
Contestants from 38 countries and territories were selected either as winners from their national pageants, or appointed to their positions after being runner-up in their national pageant between 2019 and 2023 or being chosen through a casting process.

This edition debuted from Guinea Bissau, North Cyprus and Trinidad and Tobago, while Canada (2016), Colombia (2017), Lebanon (2018), Nigeria (2011), The Bahamas (2014) and Vietnam (2018) made their return. Albania, Cambodia, Hong Kong, Kazakhstan, Nicaragua, Panama and Sierra Leone participated in the previous edition but not this edition. Mali's Harouna Sissoko and Netherlands's Ilyas Chaouki were expected to compete but later withdrew, bringing the total participating countries to 36. Haiti did not take part in the Swimwear Competition held on September 10.

For the first time in 16 years, the Mister International Organization will allow fathers, married, and divorced men to compete.

== Results ==
=== Placements ===
Placement	Contestants
Mister International 2023	Thailand – Thitisan Goodburn §
1st Runner-Up	Venezuela – William Badell
2nd Runner-Up	Brazil – Edward Ogunniya
Top 5	France – Lucas Schlachter; India – Shashwat Dwivedi
Top 10	Colombia – Daniel García; Peru – Joel Farach; Philippines – Jefferson Bunney; Singapore – Joshua Hee; Spain – Borxa Ramo
Top 20	Cuba – Daruma Almenares; Czech Republic – Alexandros Panayi; Dominican Republic – Ovarlyn Torres; Guinea-Bissau – Gabriel Monteiro; South Korea – Ho Sun Kang; Lebanon – Seif Al'walid Harb; Mexico – Brian Ceballos; Puerto Rico – Joshua Maldonado; Switzerland – Elson Bytyqi; The Bahamas – Vjaughn Ingraham

§ – Voted into the Top 20 by viewers.

=== Special awards ===
Category	Awards	Winner	Runner-ups
MAIN AWARDS	Best in Swimwear	Lebanon – Seif Al'walid Harb	
MAIN AWARDS	Best National Costume	Thailand – Thitisan Goodburn	
MAIN AWARDS	Mister Congeniality	Nepal – Prajwol Tamrakar	
MAIN AWARDS	Mister Charming	Switzerland – Elson Bytyqi	
MAIN AWARDS	Mister Photogenic	Spain – Borxa Ramo Ruiz	
MAIN AWARDS	Fan Votes	Thailand – Thitisan Goodburn	
SPONSORS AWARDS	Ayutthaya Popular Vote	Lebanon – Seif Al'walid Harb	
SPONSORS AWARDS	Mister Chat Influencer	Colombia – Daniel Alejandro García Molina	
SPONSORS AWARDS	Mister Lucky	Canada – Rennel Ricketts	Czech Republic – Alexandros Panayi; North Cyprus – Suleyman Mullahasan
SPONSORS AWARDS	Most Attractive Men	Japan – Koki Sakata; Philippines – Jefferson Nigel Allan Bunney; Singapore – Joshua Hee; Switzerland – Elson Bytyqi; Taiwan – Chen Chien Yu	
SPONSORS AWARDS	Most Charisma Men	Lebanon – Seif Al'walid Harb; Mexico – Brian Eduardo Ceballos; Peru – Joel Farach Marquina; Thailand – Thitisan Goodburn; Venezuela – William Manuel Badell López	
SPONSORS AWARDS	Shining Bright by HYA	Taiwan – Chen Chien Yu	France – Lucas Schlachter; Japan – Koki Sakata
SPONSORS AWARDS	Smart Guy	Brazil – Edward Taiye Ogunniya; Cuba – Daruma Almenares; India – Shashwat Dwivedi; Guinea-Bissau – Gabriel Monteiro; South Korea – Ho Sun Kang	

== Competition events ==
All times in this article are Indochina Time (UTC+7)

=== Preliminary Competition ===
The Preliminary Competition Presented by CHAT Cosmetics will be broadcast LIVE via Mister International's official Facebook page from Bangkok, Thailand, held on September 15 at 7 p.m. (ICT / Bangkok time).

=== Swimwear Competition ===
The Swimwear Competition Presented by CHAT Cosmetics was broadcast LIVE via Mister International official Facebook page from Ayutthaya, Thailand, held on September 10 at 7 p.m. (ICT / Bangkok time). Haiti's Samuel Saint Juste did not take part in the Swimwear Competition held on September 10. Mister Lucky awards were selected at random by the sponsors, the winner, Canada's Rennel Ricketts, won ฿30,000 and the other two runner-ups, Czech Republic's Alexandros Panayi and North Cyprus's Suleyman Mullahasan with ฿10,000 each.

== Contestants ==
36 contestants have been confirmed:

Country/Territory	Delegate	Age (Note: Ages at the time of the pageant.)	Height	Ref.
Belgium	Maksym Belevyh	21	1.80 m (5 ft 11 in)	
Brazil	Edward Taiye Ogunniya	32	1.89 m (6 ft 2 1/2 in)	
Canada	Rennel Ricketts	23	1.83 m (6 ft 0 in)	
Colombia	Daniel Alejandro García Molina	29	1.81 m (5 ft 11 1/2 in)	
Cuba	Daruma Almenares	30	1.82 m (5 ft 11 1/2 in)	
Czech Republic	Alexandros Panayi	26	1.82 m (5 ft 11 1/2 in)	
Dominican Republic	Ovarlyn Torres	26	1.85 m (6 ft 1 in)	
France	Lucas Schlachter	22	1.89 m (6 ft 2 1/2 in)	
Guinea-Bissau	Gabriel Monteiro	27	1.93 m (6 ft 4 in)	
Haiti	Samuel Saint Juste	31	1.85 m (6 ft 1 in)	
India	Shashwat Dwivedi	20	1.88 m (6 ft 2 in)	
Indonesia	Jeremy Gregory Samatara	25	1.78 m (5 ft 10 in)	
Japan	Koki Sakata	30	1.83 m (6 ft 0 in)	
Korea	Ho Sun Kang	32	1.87 m (6 ft 1 1/2 in)	
Laos	Donesavanh Xaimonty	20	1.80 m (5 ft 11 in)	
Lebanon	Seif Al'walid Harb	23	1.90 m (6 ft 3 in)	
Malaysia	Arvind Gorasia	29	1.83 m (6 ft 0 in)	
Mexico	Brian Eduardo Ceballos	27	1.83 m (6 ft 0 in)	
Myanmar	Austin Myat	23	1.80 m (5 ft 11 in)	
Nepal	Prajwol Tamrakar	24	TBA	
Nigeria	Martin Osagie Omoregbee	23	1.80 m (5 ft 11 in)	
North Cyprus	Suleyman Mullahasan	TBA	TBA	
Peru	Joel Farach Marquina	33	1.87 m (6 ft 1 1/2 in)	
Philippines	Jefferson Nigel Allan Bunney	28	1.83 m (6 ft 0 in)	
Puerto Rico	Joshua Yaddah Maldonado Cruz	29	TBA	
Singapore	Joshua Hee	25	1.74 m (5 ft 8 1/2 in)	
Spain	Borxa Ramo Ruiz	25	1.91 m (6 ft 3 in)	
Sri Lanka	Derrein Keith Christian De Zilwa	20	TBA	
Switzerland	Elson Bytyqi	20	1.85 m (6 ft 1 in)	
Taiwan	Chen Chien Yu	TBA	TBA	
Thailand	Thitisan Goodburn	24	1.80 m (5 ft 11 in)	
The Bahamas	Vjaughn Ingraham	21	1.91 m (6 ft 3 in)	
Trinidad and Tobago	Johnathan Samuel	TBA	TBA	
United States	Hector Louis Rodríguez	28	1.78 m (5 ft 10 in)	
Venezuela	William Manuel Badell López	27	1.88 m (6 ft 2 in)	
Vietnam	Phạm Minh Quyền	29	1.88 m (6 ft 2 in)	
