= An Eye for an Eye (Thai TV series) =

2021 Thai television series

- Official series poster
- Thai: เธอ เขา เงาแค้น
- Genre: Romance; Revenge drama
- Directed by: Attaporn Teemarkorn
- Starring: Phiyada Chutharatkul; Perawat Sangpotirat
- Opening theme: "ขอโทษที่ยังร้องไห้ (Missing)" by Krist Perawat
- Country of origin: Thailand
- Original language: Thai
- No. of episodes: 18

Production
- Running time: 50 minutes
- Production companies: GMMTV; Anda99

Original release
- Network: GMM 25; Line TV
- Release: 17 May – 13 July 2021

An Eye for an Eye (Thai: เธอ เขา เงาแค้น; RTGS: Thoe Khao Ngao Khaen) is a Thai television series starring Phiyada Chutharatkul (Aom) and Perawat Sangpotirat (Krist). Directed by Attaporn Teemarkorn (Noom) and produced by GMMTV together with Anda99, it was announced as one of the television series of GMMTV for 2021 during their "GMMTV2021: The New Decade Begins" event on December 3, 2020. It officially premiered on GMM 25 and Line TV on May 17, 2021, and ran until July 13, 2021.

== Synopsis ==
The Julapakborirak family falls into turmoil when their patriarch, Thanapob (Patee Sarasin), the president of JPB Group, dies in a fatal small plane crash which his eldest daughter, Metinee (Saiparn Apinya), miraculously survives. Shortly after his passing, Thanapob's new wife and former secretary, Getsara (Aom Phiyada), immediately takes control as the new president. This rapid transition triggers an immediate backlash from Metinee, who suspects foul play and accuses her new stepmother of plotting the murder. Seeking the truth, she urges her younger brothers, Wayu (Krist Perawat) and Gumpanart (Mek Jirakit), to conduct an investigation. While Gumpanart remains skeptical of the accusations, Wayu's hidden romantic feelings for his stepmother prompt him to remain in Thailand to uncover the truth behind the crash.

The conflict escalates when Passon (Jason Young), Getsara's former lover, returns shortly after Thanapob's death to claim a past promise they had made only to find she was consistently trying to distance herself. Seeking leverage against her, Passon builds a strategic alliance with Metinee to spark internal chaos within the JPB Group, while simultaneously planting his niece, Nuengjai (Fah Yongwaree), as Wayu's secretary to spy on the family. As Passon digs deeper, he discovers a mutual romantic attraction between Getsara and Wayu, prompting his initiation of a plan to get rid of Wayu. Driven by tensions of love, greed, and a bitter corporate conflict, the drama entangles the characters in a destructive cycle of manipulation and retaliation.

== Cast and characters ==
=== Main ===
- Phiyada Chutharatkul (Aom) as Getsara "Get"
- Perawat Sangpotirat (Krist) as Wayu "Yu"

=== Supporting ===
- Yongwaree Anilbol (Fah) as Nuengjai
- Apinya Sakuljaroensuk (Saiparn) as Metinee "Mei"
- Jirakit Thawornwong (Mek) as Gumpanart "Gump"
- Pawat Chittsawangdee (Ohm) as Nawa
- Jason Young as Passon "Pas" (Nuengjai's uncle)
- Pimthong Washirakom (Dao) as Roong
- Patee Sarasin as Thanapob
