= SuckSeed =

- Theatrical release poster
- Directed by: Chayanop Boonprakob
- Written by: Chayanop Boonprakob; Tossapol Tiptinnakorn; Nottapon Boonprakob; Siwawut Sewatanon; Panayu Kunvalee
- Produced by: Jira Maligool; Chenchonnanee Soonthonsaratul; Suwimol Techasupinan; Vanridee Pongsittisak
- Starring: Jirayu Laongmanee; Pachara Chirathivat; Thawat Pornrattanaprasert; Nattasha Nauljam
- Cinematography: Naruphol Chokkhanaphitak
- Edited by: Panayu Kunvanlee
- Music by: Vichaya Vatanasapt; Genie Records
- Production company: GTH
- Release date: 17 March 2011 (Thailand)
- Running time: 130 minutes
- Country: Thailand
- Language: Thai
- Box office: US$2,600,673

SuckSeed (Thai: ซักซี้ด ห่วยขั้นเทพ, SuckSeed: Huay Khan Thep) is a 2011 Thai musical comedy film released by GTH. Directed by first-time feature director Chayanop Boonprakob, this film stars teenage actors Jirayu Laongmanee, Pachara Chirathivat, Thawat Pornrattanaprasert, and Nattasha Nauljam. The film follows the antics of three secondary school students who form a rock band to impress girls. Despite their efforts, their band plays poorly and the members regularly end up as losers.

Based in part on Chayanop's thesis project short film about a band of young members who perform badly but insist on trying, the film features themes of teenage dreams, friendship, romance, and their expression through music, and includes pieces of popular rock songs interspersed within the narrative as well as cameos by several well-known musicians.

SuckSeed was released in the Thai box office on 17 March 2011. It grossed a total of 21.4 million baht on its opening weekend. In total, the film earned US$2,600,673 in the Thai box office.

== Cast ==
=== Main ===
- Pachara Chirathivat as Koong and Kay
- Jirayu La-ongmanee as Ped
- Nattasha Nauljam as Ern
- Thawat Pornrattanaprasert as Ex

=== Supporting ===
- Tonhon Tantiwetchakun as Ped (young)
- Gunn Junhavat as Tem
- Anchasa Mongkhonsamai as Som
- Adisorn Tresirikasem

=== Guest ===
- Arak Amornsupasiri as Himself
