= Phiyada Chutharatkul =

Thai actress, model and host (born 1975)

- พิยดา จุฑารัตนกุล
- Born: Phiyada Akkaraseranee; June 17, 1975 (age 51); Bangkok, Thailand
- Other name: Aom (อ้อม)
- Education: Srinakharinwirot University
- Occupations: Actress; model; MC; producer
- Years active: 1996–present
- Height: 1.60 m (5 ft 3 in)
- Spouse: Sara Chutharatkul (m. 2009)
- Children: 1
- Parent: Pisarn Akarasenee

Phiyada Akkaraseranee (Thai: พิยดา อัครเศรณี, RTGS: Phiyada Akkharaserani; born 17 June 1975), later Phiyada Chutharatkul (Thai: พิยดา จุฑารัตนกุล), nickname Aom (Thai: อ้อม; RTGS: Om) is a Thai actress, model, and host. She is the second daughter of Pisarn Akarasenee, a well-known actor in and producer of various popular Thai TV series.

== Life ==
Phiyada Akkraseranee was born in Bangkok, where she graduated with a Bachelor of Science degree in education from the Srinakharinwirot University. She began her career as a model for commercials on TV in 1996. Her first drama as the leading actress was Torfun and Marwin produced by Exact co. Since then Aom has filmed many popular dramas such as "Torfun Gub Marwin" "Keb Pandin" "Ruk Kerd Nai Thaladsod" "Roy Leh Saneh Rai" "Mueng Dala" "Lued Kattiya" "Song Rao Nirundorn" "Huajai Chocolate" "Ruk Tur Took Wun" "BangRuk Soi 9" "Malai Sarm Chai"and so on. Aom received popular and talent awards including Best Actress from the Asian Television Awards. Meanwhile, Aom also became a hot host of variety talk shows for Wan Warn Yang Wharn You and E-mouth since 2004.

Aom engaged to her boyfriend Art Sara Chutharatkul on July 4, 2009. They were married in August 2009, and their wedding reception was held in October 2009. They have a daughter named Nava.

== Filmography ==
=== Film ===
- The Remaker (คนระลึกชาติ)(2005) with Andrew Gregson

=== Television series ===
Year	Title	Role	Notes
1996	Torfun Gub Marwin	Torfun Boonyapat	Main role
1997	Samwai Gub Aijoke	Jig	Main role
1998	Poo Chai Hua Jai Mai Pae	"Kaew"/Kullanat	Main role
1999	Game Ruk Payabaht	Ramida	Main role
1999	Dod Diew Mai Diew Dai	Nicha	Main role
1999	Ruk Nai Sai Mok	Pupae	Main role
2000	Muang Maya	Herself	Guest role
2000	Pan Thai Nora Sing	Nuon	Main role
2001	Keb Pandin	Punpasa	Main role
2001	Rak Koet Nai Talat Sot	Kimlang	Main role
2001	Hongfah Kub Somwung	Hongfah	Main role
2001	Fah Pieng Din	"Celica"/ Chompoo Sarayutthaphichai	Main role
2002	Roy Leh Sanae Rai	Namnueng	Main role
2003	Muang Dala	Wansai	Main role
2003	Bang Rak Soi 9	Pang	Main role
2003	Luerd Kattiya	Princess Thippiyarutdarakumari	Main role
2004	Glub Ban Rao Na...Ruk Ror Yoo	Jomkwan	Main role
2005	Kaew Lerm Korn	Kaew	Main role
2005	Hua Jai Chocolate	Wan	Main role
2005	Song Rao...Nirundon	"Fon"/Plaifon	Main role
2006	Sanya Kaen Saen Ruk	Wong Waen	Main role
2007	La Ong Dao	"Tan"/La Ong Dao	Main role
2007	Ruk Tur Took Wan	"Rissa"/Irissa	Main role
2009	Artit Ching Duang	Rangrong	Main role
2009	Fai Ruk Arsoon		Guest role
2009	Proong Nee Gor Ruk Ter	Kaew	Main role
2010	Malai Sarm Chai	La-Oor-Orn	Main role
2012	Moo Daeng		Guest role
2013	Koo Gum	Wedding guest	Guest role
2013	Paap Ataan	Prayong	Main role
2015	Ngao Jai		Guest role
2015	Ban Lang Mek	Panrung Samurtaeqa	Main role
2016	Rang Mai Hua Jai Derm		Guest role
2016	Bang Rak Soi 9/1 (Season 1)	Pang	Main role
2017	Sanaeha Diary Series: Gub Dug Sanaeha	Lita	Main role
2017	Sanaeha Diary Series: Buang Sanaeha	Lita	Guest role
2017	Mo Thewada		Guest role
2017	Sri Ayodhaya		Guest role
2018	Bang Rak Soi 9/1 (Season 2)	Pang	Main role
2018	Kahon Maha Ratuek		Guest role
2018	Club Friday (Season 10)	"Rin"/Tua Prakop	Main role
2019	Talay Rissaya	Pawinee	Main role
2021	An Eye for an Eye	"Get"/Getsara	Main role
2022	Suptar 2550	Herself	Guest role
2024	Bangkok Blossom	Ratree	Supporting role
2026	Mother Land		Supporting role
2026	The School	Sasiwimol	Main role
2026	Duang with You	Qin's mother	Supporting role
2026	The Last Duel	Wisut Kasattri	Supporting role
2026	Sky Castle Thailand	"Fah" Salilathip Kiatsathitsakul	Main role

== Variety show host ==
- Wan Warn Yang Wharn Yoo (วันวานยังหวานอยู่) with Gik Giert Gritjaruen(CH7)
- E(ntertainment) mouth (E-mouth) [Music program] with Na Nek (Ketsetsawat Palakawong Na Ayutthaya)(CH7)
- Game Wat Duang (เกมวัดดวง) with Na Nek (Ketsetsawat Palakawong Na Ayutthaya)(CH5)
- I Love the Night Life with Puri Hiranpruk(CH3)
- Trendy-D with Fluke Kerkpol(CH5)
- Club 5 Report (CH5)
- JeabAom (CH3)

== Awards ==
=== 2002 ===
- Mekhalar Award - Best Leading Actress(Roy Leh Saneh Rai)
- Top Award - Best Leading Actress(Roy Leh Saneh Rai)
- The Good Child of the Year Award

=== 2004 ===
- Mekhalar Award - Best Comedic Actress(Bangruk Soi 9)
- Golden Award - Best Host(Wan Warn Yang Wharn Yoo)
- Hamburger Award- Best Actress

=== 2005 ===
- Tape Tong Award - Best Host(Wan Warn Yang Wharn Yoo)
- IN magazine Award - Best love couple in drama(Song Rao Nirundorn)

=== 2006 ===
- Asian Television Award 2006 - Best Leading Actress(Hua Jai Chocolate)
- TV Gossip Award - Best Host(WanWaanYungWaanYoo)
- Young & Smart Award - Best Actress

=== 2007 ===
- IN magazine Award-Best love couple in drama(Ruk Tur Took Wun)
- Seventeen Star Icon
- OK! Magazine Award -Female Hot Stuff
