= Tao Kae Noi =

Thai seaweed snack brand

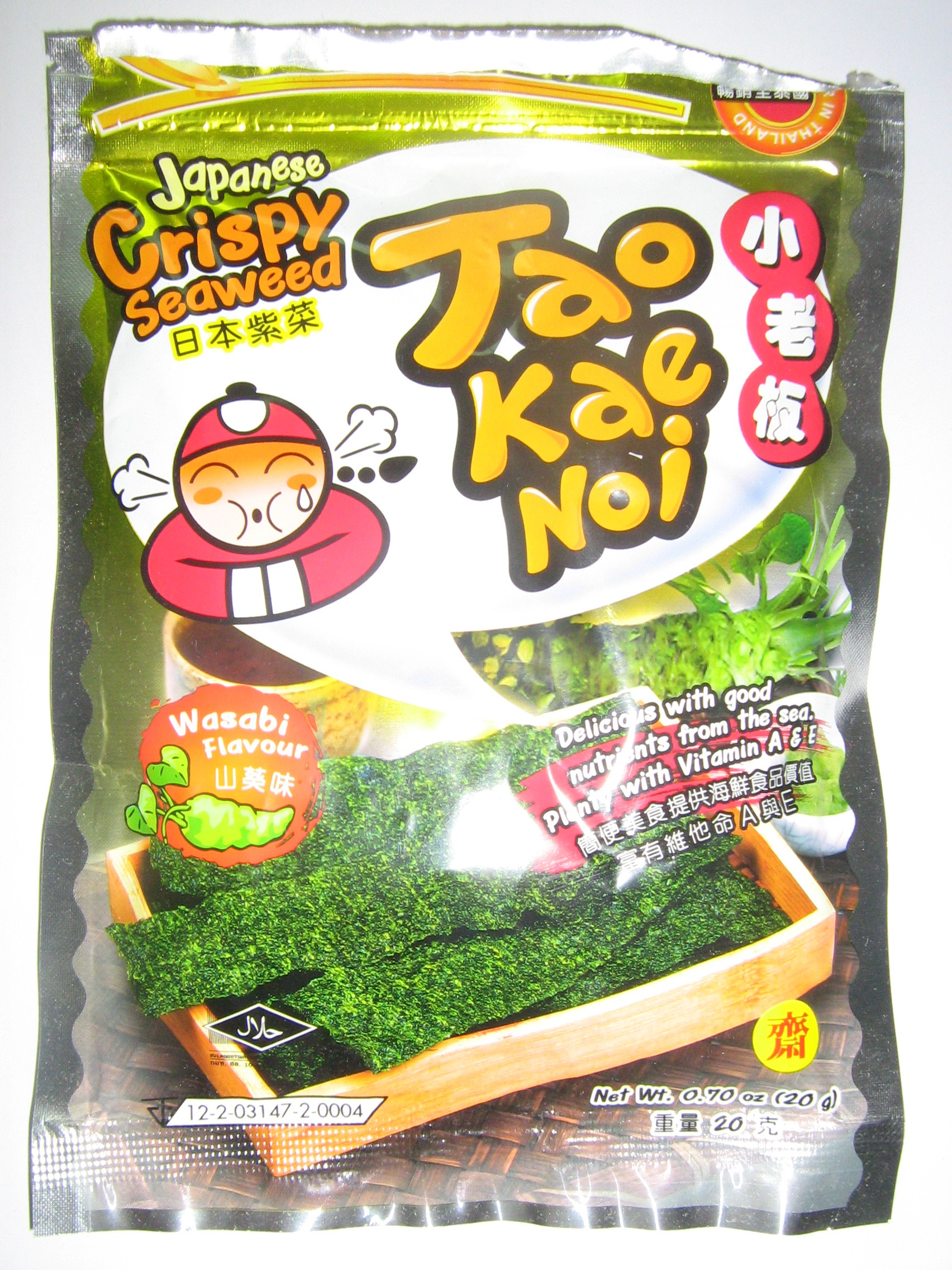
- Product type: Seaweed
- Current owner: Itthipat Peeradechapan
- Produced by: Taokaenoi Food & Marketing PCL
- Country: Thailand
- Introduced: 2004; 22 years ago
- Markets: World
- Website: http://www.taokaenoi.co.th/

Tao Kae Noi (Thai: เถ้าแก่น้อย; RTGS: Thao Kae Noi) is a Thai crispy seaweed snack product. It was founded by Itthipat Peeradechapan in 2004.

Taokaenoi Food & Marketing PCL (SET: TKN, บริษัท เถ้าแก่น้อย ฟู๊ดแอนด์มาร์เก็ตติ้ง จำกัด) is a food company, manufacturer and distributor of crispy seaweed snack. The company has three food and beverage business operations: snacks, restaurants, and seasoning powder. It produces fried, grilled, baked, crispy, roasted, and tempura seaweeds; souvenirs, roll farm products, corn snacks, mini breads, corns, fruits, and potato sticks.

In 2004, Taokaenoi started selling seaweed products in 7-Eleven stores in Thailand. Taokaenoi currently exports products to over 40 countries worldwide and began being publicly traded in 2015 with an initial public offering of 1.4 billion baht (USD 39.1 million).

The name 'Tao Kae Noi' means 'little boss' for the reason that it was founded by Itthipat Peeradechapan, also known as Tob, the CEO, when he was only 19 years old. The story of its founding was the inspiration for the 2011 film The Billionaire.

== History ==
In 2001, Tob entered the University of the Thai Chamber of Commerce when he was 17, the same year his family encountered a financial crisis, resulting in bankruptcy and a debt of 10 million US dollars. He decided to help his family, and to raise funds, he sold his gaming ID for a substantial sum and began brainstorming ways to utilize the proceeds to support his family's financial stability.

Before founding Tao Kae Noi seaweed, Tob's initial venture was in the chestnut business. Unable to afford the franchise, Tob engaged in discussions with the owner of the chestnut brand to secure the rental of the chestnut roaster for his new franchise. On the day he needed to sign the contract to rent a selling place at the shopping mall, Tob's father spoke to his friend and mentioned, 'My son is going to become a little boss.' This phrase, 'little boss,' resonated with Tob as he signed the contract, leading to the choice of the brand name 'Taokaaenoi,' which translates to ‘little boss’.

In just a little over a year, Itthiphat expanded the Tao Kae Noi chestnut franchise from one branch to over 30, enabling him to introduce other imported products in the storefronts. These products included dried longan, lychee, and seaweed. It turned out that the fried seaweed was the best-selling product, surpassing the performance of the chestnuts themselves. This success promoted him to further develop the seaweed business.

Tob was interested in the seaweed business and initiated a trial sales effort by packaging them in plastic bags and distributing them to various stores. One day, he entered a 7-Eleven store and became interested in the convenience store market, realizing that he would not have to handle the product distribution himself. With the feedback he received, he improved his product to meet the standards required for selling in 7-Eleven stores. Once the products met the standards, 7-Eleven requested that he produce a sufficient quantity to be sold in 3,000 branches within 3 months. At the age of 20, he made the pivotal decision to sell his 30 chestnut branches, using the proceeds to invest in a seaweed factory. His delivery of products to 7-Eleven's distribution center marked the beginning of a Tao Kae Noi's growth.

== Ingredients ==
Taokaenoi seaweed snacks feature seaweed as the primary ingredient, complemented by palm oil, salt, pepper, and flavor enhancers. Other ingredients for other products and flavours can include chili, seafood powder(Squid, Shrimp), Spice mix(Garlic, White pepper, Coriander Seed), Hydrolyzed Soy Protein(Soybean, Maltodextrin, Salt, Caramel), Smoked flavour powder[Salt, Tapioca starch, Smoke oil(Natural Flavour), Cellulose powder].

== Nutritional information ==
Taokaenoi has declared itself as a healthy snack. Each serving of Tao Kae Noi crispy seaweed big sheet in the classic flavor contains 21 kilocalories, 0.6 g of saturated fat, 20 mg of sodium, 0.6 g of protein (Nx6.25), 0.5 g of dietary fiber, and 0 g of sugars. These snacks also provide essential vitamins and minerals, including 45.03 mcg of Vitamin A, 0.23 mg of Vitamin C, 0.01 mg of Vitamin B1, 0.04 mg of Vitamin B2, 0.16 mg of iron, and 1.70 mg of calcium.

== Marketing ==
Initially, Tob explored various product options beyond seaweed but soon recognized the need to establish a distinctive brand identity. Consequently, he made the strategic decision to concentrate exclusively on seaweed-based snacks.

Tob's vision for the 'Taokaenoi' brand was to make it synonymous with seaweed snacks, much like how the term 'Mama' is commonly used by Thai people to refer to instant noodles, irrespective of the actual brand. To reinforce the connection between 'seaweed' and 'สาหร่าย เถ้าแก่น้อย,' the Thai translation for seaweed, Tob employed a renowned English tutor. He incorporated the brand name 'Taokaenoi' after the translation because, at the time, many Thai consumers were not familiar with the English term 'seaweed.' This strategic move firmly established the brand's identity as 'seaweed snacks are Taokaenoi, and Taokaenoi signifies seaweed snacks.'

=== International Expansion ===
In 2005, Taokaenoi commenced international expansion by collaborating with domestic exporters (Thai Exporter) to target the Hong Kong and Singapore markets. This decision was rooted in the belief that despite their smaller populations, these countries had considerable purchasing power.

Inspiration struck when traders began selling Taokaenoi products in Singaporean grocery stores, indicating the potential for success in shopping malls. To penetrate the international market, Tob adopted a proactive marketing approach, directly engaging with malls to showcase and promote his products via email, as opposed to relying on traditional methods like food fairs. He also sought out importer and distributor companies and contacted them directly, which proved highly effective in bringing his products to market. Currently, Tao Kae Noi exports to numerous countries, including Singapore, Hong Kong, Taiwan, Indonesia, and more.

Country	Description
^{China}	^{In 2018, Tao Kae Noi established a representative office in Shanghai, China, with the aim of supporting sales and marketing activities within the Chinese market.}^{In 2019, Tao Kae Noi entered into a strategic collaboration with ORION Group, a business group with more than 40 years of experience in China. As part of this partnership, PAN ORION Corp. Limited acquired a 3.5% stake in Tao Kae Noi and was appointed as the exclusive sales representative for the Chinese market.}^{In 2020, Tao Kae Noi decided to close its representative office in Shanghai, China, and shifted all communication channels to be directly managed from Thailand.}^{In 2021, Tao Kae Noi added another distributor in China to oversee both traditional and online sales in the country. As a result, the status of ORION was changed from an exclusive distributor to a general distributor.}
^{Indonesia}	^{In 2021, Tao Kae Noi's products were released through the largest distribution channel in Indonesia, which is convenience stores (VS).}
^{Singapore}	^{Tao Kae Noi began distributing products to the Singaporean market through Thai exporters in 2005.}
^{United states}	^{In 2017, Tao Kae Noi completed the acquisition of GIM Factory Inc., now known as Taokaenoi USA Inc. This California-based company is renowned for its roasted seaweed products. This acquisition represented the company's initial venture into international operations and became its third global facility.}^{In 2019, the company restructured the operations of Taokaenoi USA Inc., shifting its role from being a factory and distributor to that of a regional sales office in the USA.}

=== Collaborations ===
Tao Kae Noi seaweed and Glico biscuits have collaborated to introduce Pretz Tao Kae Noi nori seaweed with the aim of stimulating consumer spending. In this partnership, Glico biscuits manage the distribution of Pretz Tao Kae Noi nori seaweed through modern trade channels, while Tao Kae Noi is responsible for sales through Tao Kae Noi Land shops across the nation and traditional retail outlets.

Initially, their collaboration is focused on the domestic market, but there is potential for expansion into international markets in the long term. Glico exports its products to eight ASEAN countries, and Tao Kae Noi products are currently available in over 40 countries worldwide.
