= Art Arya =

Thai drag performer, designer, and stylist

- Born: Araya Indra; August 30, 1971 (age 55); Bangkok, Thailand
- Education: Silpakorn University
- Occupations: Drag performer; Designer; Stylist; Television personality
- Television: Drag Race Thailand; The Face Thailand; The Face Men Thailand

Araya Indra (Thai: อารยา อินทรา), known by the stage name Art Arya (born August 30, 1971), is a Thai drag performer, designer, and stylist. She is a judge and former host of Drag Race Thailand. She has worked in the fashion industry for three decades and has appeared on two seasons of The Face Thailand. She has been described as one of Thailand's most famous drag queens.

== Early life ==
Art Arya was born on August 30, 1971 in Bangkok to a Thai family with Chinese ancestry. She had her first experience with makeup at the age of ten in elementary school.

== Career ==
Art Arya studied art and fashion design in Bangkok and France. In 1988 she began studying at Silpakorn University in Bangkok; as part of a hazing ritual in her first year she was forced to dress in women's clothing for entertainment. Afterwards, Art Arya began wearing women's clothes around campus and focusing her studies on fashion.

Art Arya moved to Paris in the early 1990s to continue studying fashion. She first heard RuPaul's "Supermodel (You Better Work)" at Le Queen nightclub in 1992 and became intrigued by western conceptions of drag performance. Her fascination with RuPaul meant that she had followed RuPaul's Drag Race since its debut season in 2009 prior to becoming host of Drag Race Thailand in 2018. When Drag Race Thailand returned for its third season in 2024, Art Arya became a rotating permanent judge with her co-host Pangina Heals assuming full hosting duties.

She worked for Lanvin for a number of years in Paris before returning to Bangkok to work as a freelance designer and fashion stylist. As of 2018 she serves as the creative director of the Thai label THEATRE.

== Filmography ==
=== Television ===
- Vietnam's Next Top Model season 5, designer client (2014)
- Drag Race Thailand, host (2018-2019) and judge (2018-present)
- The Face Thailand season 5, master mentor (2019)
- The Face Men Thailand season 3, mentor (2019)
