= The Billionaire =

- Film poster
- Directed by: Songyos Sugmakanan
- Written by: Nawapol Thamrongrattanarit
- Produced by: Jira Maligool; Chenchonnee Soonthornsaratul; Vanridee Pongsittisak; Radeenapis Kosiyachinda; Suwimon Techasupinan
- Starring: Pachara Chirathivat; Somboonsuk Niyomsiri; Walanlak Kumsuwan
- Cinematography: Niramon Ross
- Edited by: Sasikarn Suwansuthi
- Music by: Terdsak Janpan
- Production company: Nadao Bangkok
- Distributed by: GTH
- Release date: 20 October 2011 (Thailand)
- Running time: 124 minutes
- Country: Thailand
- Language: Thai
- Box office: 38,796,264 THB

The Billionaire, also known as Top Secret: Wai Roon Pan Lan (Thai: วัยรุ่นพันล้าน, pronounced [wāj rûn pʰān láːn]), is a 2011 Thai biographical drama film produced by Nadao Bangkok and released by GTH. It was directed by Songyos Sugmakanan, and stars Pachara Chirathivat, Somboonsuk Niyomsiri (aka Piak Poster) and Walanlak Kumsuwan. The Billionaire tells the story of Itthipat Kulapongvanich and how he, at the age of nineteen, dropped out from university to launch a packaged fried seaweed business that is now Taokaenoi Food & Marketing and became one of Thailand's youngest (baht) billionaires. It grossed 38,796,264 baht.

== Plot ==
In 2002, Itthipat "Top" Kulapongvanich makes money from real money trading in an online game, resulting in his school grades dropping. The following year, he ignores his parents' university advice and attempts to start a business out of reselling Chinese-made DVD players; he ends up buying bad quality players using his university tuition. In an attempt to get money for college, Top secretly steals and sells his father's amulet and later skips school, telling his friend to record the classes so he doesn't miss out.

Top visits a trade fair and visits a sweet chestnut stand, inspiring him to start a sweet chestnut business, hiring his uncle Tuan as a clerk. However, their stand at the mall receives no customers at all, and he negotiates with the mall to have his stand moved to a different location. Some time later, Top flees a complulsory exam when he learns that their stand has gained success, but finds out that the chestnut machine's smoke has stained the mall. He also finds out that his father's business is in heavy debt, and his parents plan to move to China where Top's siblings are working. Top decides to stay in Thailand, opting to continue his chestnut business.

Top's situation gets worse - painting the stain disturbs other stands, the chestnut machine starts breaking, and his house is foreclosed on by a bank mortgage. During a date with his girlfriend Rin, he tries seasoned seaweed that she brought home and is inspired to try a seasoned seaweed business instead. After some difficulties of trying to find a way to successfully fry the seaweed, Top sells his computers to buy more seaweed. On a rainy night, he returns home to find Tuan collapsed and sends him to the hospital. However, this results in a discovery of a way to fry seaweed, as a piece of seaweed was moistened by the rain.

The seaweed business is a success, with an estimated 1 million baht per year being predicted. Top learns that his father's indebted to 40 million baht, and soon his house is put on sale. Albeit considering moving to China, he is then inspired to sell his seaweed to 7-Eleven. He makes an appointment with Pooh, the person in charge of the company that owns 7-Eleven, only to be told that his product doesn't fit the chain's requirements. After breaking up with Rin, Top gets the packaging fixed and visits Pooh without making an appointment. Although she never meets him due to her being busy, Pooh discovers the new packaging while her employees enjoy the seaweed packs Top left behind.

The seasoned seaweed snack, named Tao Kae Noi, is accepted by 7-Eleven and Top is told to set up a factory that would pass a sanitary inspection set to happen in one month. Top attempts to get a loan from a bank and tells his story to a banker (this scene is used as a framing device for the movie up until it happens), who rejects him due to his young age and the fact that his parents are overseas. A devastated Top once again considers moving to China, but after being rejected and threatened with a gun by a pawn shopkeeper that he sold his amulet to, he decides to go ahead with the factory and sets it up at an abandoned warehouse. The factory passes the inspection despite several problems, which Top fixes, and he is able to make his first delivery to 7-Eleven. Top calls his parents and tells them they can return home.

Top, having paid off his parents' debt, lives with them while Tao Kae Noi grows - the business receives 2,500 employees, has reached 6,000 7-Eleven stores, has been delivered to 27 countries, owns a seaweed farm in South Korea, and sells around 15 billion baht in 2010, making Top the youngest billionaire in Thailand. Top is then shown playing games on a plane, happily continuing his gaming hobby.
