= Wake Up Ladies: The Series =

2018 Thai television series

- Official series poster
- Thai: Wake Up ชะนี The Series
- Genre: Romantic comedy; Drama
- Created by: GMMTV
- Based on: Mint To Be เขาว่ากันว่า...นายเกิดมาเพื่อเป็นของฉัน! by May112
- Starring: Niti Chaichitathorn; Akhamsiri Suwanasuk; Apissada Kreurkongka; Maneerat Kam-Uan; Tipnaree Weerawatnodom
- Country of origin: Thailand
- Original language: Thai
- No. of episodes: 13

Production
- Producer: Parbdee Taweesuk
- Running time: 50 minutes
- Production companies: GMMTV; Parbdee Taweesuk

Original release
- Network: One31; LINE TV; GMM 25 (Rerun)
- Release: 17 March – 16 June 2018

Related
- Wake Up Ladies: Very Complicated

Wake Up Ladies: The Series (Thai: Wake Up ชะนี The Series; Wake Up Chani The Series) is a 2018 Thai television series starring Niti Chaichitathorn (Pompam), Akhamsiri Suwanasuk (Jakjaan), Apissada Kreurkongka (Ice), Maneerat Kam-Uan (Ae) and Tipnaree Weerawatnodom (Namtan).

Produced by GMMTV together with Parbdee Taweesuk, the series was one of the ten television series for 2018 showcased by GMMTV in their "Series X" event on 1 February 2018. It premiered on One31 and LINE TV on 17 March 2018, airing on Saturdays at 22:15 ICT and 23:15 ICT, respectively. The series concluded on 16 June 2018 and was rerun on GMM 25 from 4 February 2019 to 18 March 2019, airing on Mondays and Tuesdays at 21:25 ICT.

The series was rerun again on GMM 25 starting 13 July 2020 airing on Mondays and Tuesdays at 23:00 ICT.

== Cast and characters ==
Below are the cast of the series:

=== Main ===
- Niti Chaichitathorn (Pompam) as Dr. Nat
- Akhamsiri Suwanasuk (Jakjaan) as Jane
- Apissada Kreurkongka (Ice) as Chloe
- Maneerat Kam-Uan (Ae) as Aoey
- Tipnaree Weerawatnodom (Namtan) as Tata

=== Supporting ===
- Nuttawut Jenmana (Max) as Toon
- Joey Boy as A
- Pongsatorn Jongwilas (Phuak) as Lor
- Thanat Lowkhunsombat (Lee) as Saifah
- Kanaphan Puitrakul (First) as Ryu
- Benjamin Joseph Varney as Boy
- Popethorn Soonthornyanakij as Joe
- Surapol Poonpiriya (Alex) as Chloe's father
- Preya Wongrabeb (Mam) as Tata's mother
- Thongpoom Siripipat (Big) as Ton

=== Guest role ===
- Ployshompoo Supasap (Jan) as New
- Jirakit Thawornwong (Mek) as Pat (Ep. 5 – 12)

== Soundtrack ==
Song title	Romanized title	Artist	Ref.
บทเรียนของความเชื่อใจ	Bot Rean Kong Krom Chenh Jai	Chalatit Tantiwut (Ben)	
คิดถึง..อีกแล้ว	Khit Thueng Ik Laeo	Benjamin Joseph Varney feat. Niti Chaichitathorn (Pompam)	
