= Huawei Nova 3i =

Android-based smartphone developed by smartphone

Huawei Nova 3 (Huawei P Smart+)
- Manufacturer: Huawei
- Series: Huawei Nova
- First released: July 21, 2018; 8 years ago
- Predecessor: Huawei Nova 2i
- Successor: Huawei P Smart+ 2019
- Form factor: Smartphone
- Dimensions: 157.6 mm (6.20 in) H75.2 mm (2.96 in) W7.6 mm (0.30 in) D
- Operating system: Android 8.1.0 "Oreo" upgradable up to Android 9.0 "Pie"
- Memory: 6 GB RAM
- Storage: 128GB
- Removable storage: microSD, up to 400 GB
- Battery: 4000 mAh Charging With 10W
- Rear camera: Dual (16MP + 2MP), laser autofocus, AI filter, f/2.2 aperture, 1080p resolution, 1080p video recording at 30 fps or 1080p at slow-motion video (1080p timelapse with stabilization, panorama, optical image stabilization, LED flash
- Front camera: (24 MP + 2 MP, depth sensor) aperture, exposure control, face detection
- Connectivity: Wi-Fi b/g/n/ac (2.4 GHz), Bluetooth 4.2, GPS, LTE, microUSB 2.0, USB 2.0
- Website: consumer.huawei.com/levant/phones/nova3i

The Huawei Nova 3i is an Android smartphone manufactured by Huawei as part of its mid-range Nova series. The phone was released on 21 July 2018.

== Specifications ==
=== Display and camera ===
Huawei Nova 3i has a 6.3-inch IPS LCD screen with a 1080p resolution. It has a total of four cameras: 16MP and 2MP on the back, with a 24MP and 2MP on the front.

=== Storage and configuration ===
The phone comes with 128GB of internal storage (eMMC 5.1), which can be expanded up to 400GB. It is powered by Huawei's HiSilicon Kirin 710 chipset paired with 4GB of RAM. It has a rear-mounted fingerprint scanner for improved security.

=== Battery and connectivity ===
The phone comes with a 3340 mAh battery, a microUSB charging port, and a 3.5 mm audio jack for wired headphones.

=== Software ===
The phone was shipped with Android Oreo overlaid with Huawei's EMUI 8.2.

=== Colour variants ===
This model was released in three colours: Pearl White, Black and Iris Purple.
