= Akhamsiri Suwanasuk =

Thai actress

- อคัมย์สิริ สุวรรณศุข
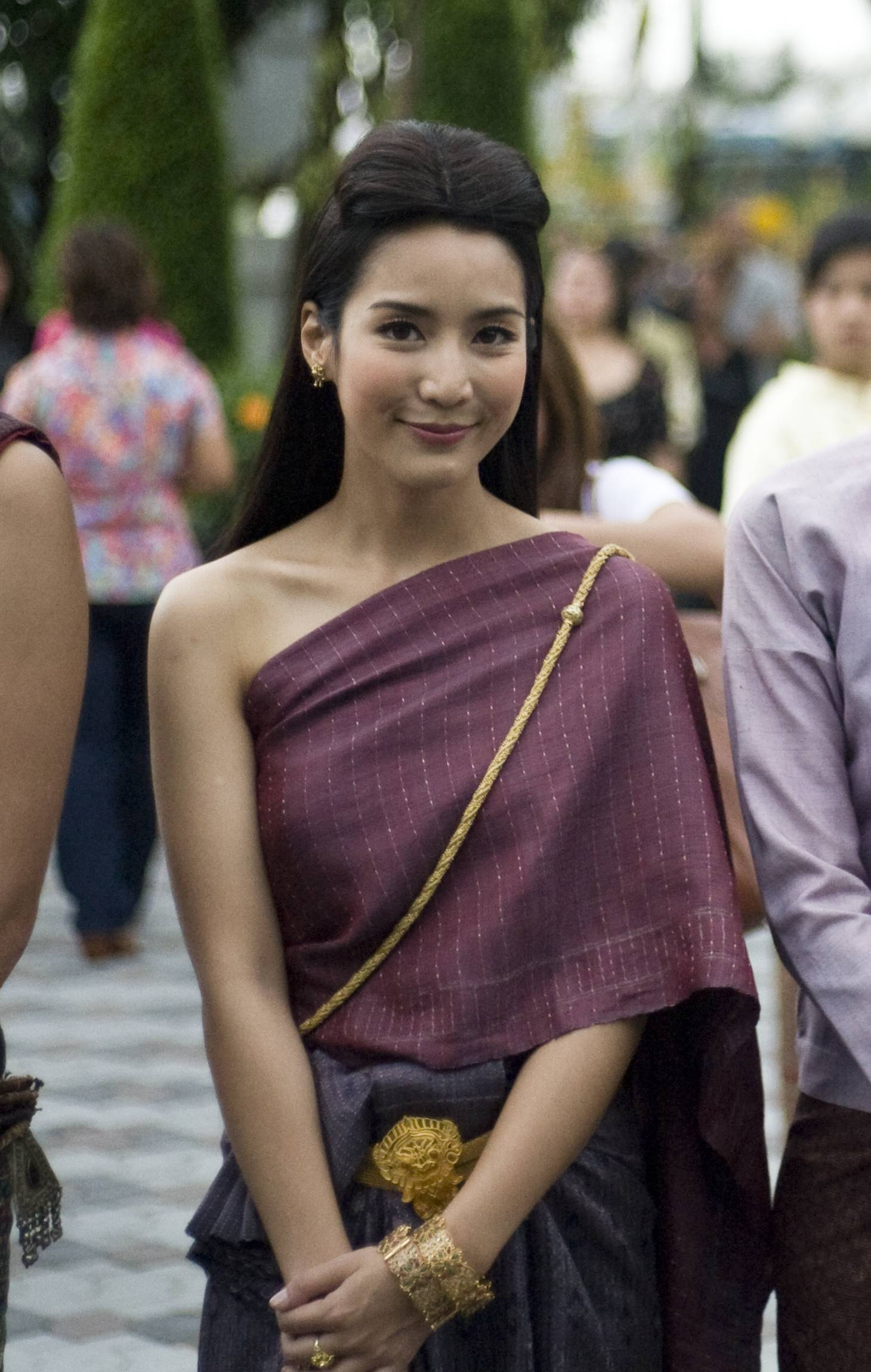
- Born: 10 June 1982 (age 44); Bangkok, Thailand
- Other name: Jakjaan (จั๊กจั่น)
- Occupations: Actress; host
- Years active: 2002–present
- Spouse(s): Watana Charoensakwatana (2021–present)

Akhamsiri Suwanasuk (Thai: อคัมย์สิริ สุวรรณศุข; born 10 June 1982) is a Thai actress and host.

== Filmography ==
=== Film ===
Year	Title	Role
2009	Wongkamlao	Piramon
2011	King Naresuan 3: Naval Battle	Ratthanawadi
2011	I Carried You Home	Pin
2013	Coffee Please	Fay
2014	King Naresuan 5: Elephant Battle	Ratthanawadi

=== Television series ===
Year	Title	Role
2002	Heha Cafe	Toiting
2003	Nah Tang See Chompoo Pra Too See Fah	Chompooprae
2005	Fun Fueng	Vilailuk
2005	Proong Nee Mai Sai Tee Ja Ruk Kan	Faikaew
2006	Poo Pitak Ruk Tur	Jirapa
2006	Sunya Khan San Ruk	Wong Wien
2007	Pu Kong Jao Sanae	Khemanit Praphaphon
2007	Dung Duang Tawun	Maithong
2007	Pluerk Sanaeha	Renuka
2008	Soo Sang Tawan	Rawikan
2009	Artit Ching Duang	Fahroong
2009	Ruk Tae Kae Dai	Saranya
2009	Roi Rak Roi Bap	Chuan
2010	My Father is a Super Star	Kate
2011	Lui	Pubpha
2011	Lily See Kularb	Leehua (Lily)
2011	Nang Sao Ruk Dee	Rakdee
2012	The Lost Star	Panfah
2012	Khun Dech	Dara
2012	Suea Saming	Kinnari / Chawemarat / Phifa Na Thong / Suea Saming
2013	Likay Ngern Roi	Kaewkudan
2013	Keu Hat Ta Krong Pi Pop	Saban-nga
2014	Yomabaan Jao Ka	Buasawan (Guest)
2014	Susan Khon Pen	Rotsukorn
2014	Neth Nakarat	Vanessa (Guest)
2015	Kard Chuek	Lamai
2016	Yiao Rattikan	Ratri
2016	Likit Rissaya	Sornklin
2017	Pring Khon Rerng Muang	Pring
2018	Wake Up Ladies	Jane
2018	Club Friday Season 10: Secret	Koi
2019	Tukta Phee	Nuanthip
2019	Don't Sleep My Hero	Susie
2019	Voice Samphat Siang Morana	Pimdao
2019	Nang Marn	Ananyatha / Panisa
2019	Sang Nang Prai	Methawalai
2020	The Daughter In Law	Khwan Khao Sao Siam / Pliwlom
2020	Wake Up Ladies season 2	Jane
2023	Wedding Plan	Imm
2023	Ruean Chadanang	Chadaphon

=== Special role ===
- Mentor in The Face Men Thailand season 3

=== Royal tributes dramas ===
Year	Title	Role
2006	Khao Khong Pho	Kaew
2008	Sathit Na Duang Chai	Ploy
2009	Dung Dao Phrao Saeng	Saowanit
2016	Tai Rom Pra Baramee: Jahk Fahk Fah Suralai	Napaporn

== Awards and nominations ==
Year	Award	Category	Result
2012	Komchadluek Award 10th	Best Actress in a Film	Nominated
2012	Suphannahong National Film Awards 29th	Best Actress	Nominated
2016	Dara Daily The Great Awards 6th	Best Leading Actress in a Television Drama	Nominated
2017	Komchadluek Award 14th	Best Leading Actress in a Television Drama	Nominated
2017	Nataraja Awards 8th	Best Leading Actress in a Television Drama	Nominated
