= Itthipat Peeradechapan =

Thai entrepreneur

- Born: Itthipat Kulapongvanich; 24 November 1984 (age 41); Bangkok, Thailand
- Occupations: Chairman and owner, Tao Kae Noi
- Spouse: Praphatsorn Viriyakijnukul
- Children: 2

Itthipat Peeradechapan (Thai: อิทธิพัทธ์ พีระเดชาพันธ์, RTGS: Itthiphat Phiradechaphan, surname changed from Kulapongvanich (กุลพงษ์วณิชย์) in 2012), nicknamed Tob (ต๊อบ), is a Thai entrepreneur.

He is most well known for his product Tao Kae Noi, a fried seaweed snack, which is sold around the Asia-Pacific area. He and his family own 73% of the company and Forbes estimated his wealth at $600 million in 2018.

As a young man, Itthipat gained success at playing online games and winning tournament prizes. He invested his money into selling fried chestnuts, which became popular in Thailand. With this financial backing, he went on to create the product of packaged deep fried flavored seaweed, which quickly became successful in Thailand, and was exported to Indonesia, Japan, Taiwan, Singapore, Malaysia, and the United States.

A Thai movie, The Billionaire, was loosely based on his life. The title refers to his status as a billionaire in Thai baht.

== Early life ==
Itthipat Kulapongvanich was born on November 24, 1984, in Thailand to a wealthy Thai Chinese family with interests in the construction industry. He attained his education from kindergarten and elementary at Panapun Wittaya School, high school at St. Francis Xavier School and senior from Suankularb Wittayalai Nonthaburi School. He obtained his bachelor's degree in business administration from the University of the Thai Chamber of Commerce.

== Business career ==
When he was still 16 years old, he was addicted to online games. Even though he gained success at playing online games and winning tournament prizes because of his hobby playing online games, he was often underestimated by his teachers at school. He decided to drop out from school to become a chestnut peddler when he was 17 years old. He invested his money into selling fried chestnuts, which became popular in Thailand.

In 2004, Itthipat founded Tao Kae Noi (Little Tycoon) Food and Marketing Co., Ltd. The brand sold fried seaweed snacks, which became highly popular among teenagers and office workers. In December 2015, the company had its initial public offer (IPO) on the Stock Exchange of Thailand, raising 1.8 billion baht. His success has made him popular among business circles and media. The company reported a net profit of 160 million baht in its third quarter in 2017. Itthipat has said he targets revenue of 1 billion U.S. dollars in 7–8 years.
