= The Face Men Thailand season 3 =

The Face Men Thailand
- Season 3
- No. of episodes: 10

Release
- Original network: Thairath TV
- Original release: 5 October – 7 December 2019

Season chronology
- ← Previous; Season 2

The Face Men Thailand Season 3 is a reality show to find the best models and actors.

On 23 September 2019, there was an official press release. The new mentors of this season have been released Akhamsiri Suwanasuk, Jirayu La-ongmanee, Araya Indra and Ajirapa Meisinger. Antoine Pinto is still the host of the program. With the program scheduled to air for the first time on October 5 of the same year.

== Contestants ==
(ages stated are at start of filming)

Contestant	Age	Height	Hometown	Previous Season	Previous Model Coach		Previous Place	Model Coach	Finish	Place
Bordinded "Best" Phanthakoengamon	18	1.92 m (6 ft 3 1/2 in)	Bangkok	Season 2	Toni		16–13	Kao	Episode 2	13
Thitisan "Kim" Goodburn	20	1.80 m (5 ft 11 in)	Bangkok	Season 2	Moo		4–2	Art/Sabina	Episode 4	12
Jirayu "Film" Uengwanit	24	1.82 m (5 ft 11 1/2 in)	Bangkok	Season 2	Moo		10–5	Kao	Episode 5	11
Npak "Jybb" Maha-Udomporn	30	unknown	Bangkok	none				Art/Sabina	Episode 6	10
Marcos Alexandre, Jr.	23	1.88 m (6 ft 2 in)	Brazil	Season 5	Toni	Maria	8	Kao	Episode 8	9
Natakorn "Peak" Rattanapet	19	unknown	Chanthaburi	none				Jakjaan	Episode 9	8–5
Nonthat "Bom" Thanawatyanyong	27	1.80 m (5 ft 11 in)	Bangkok	Season 2	Moo		10–5	Jakjaan	Episode 9	8–5
Pierre Paul de Bodt	23	1.85 m (6 ft 1 in)	Bangkok	Season 2	Moo		16–13	Jakjaan	Episode 9	8–5
Gregoire "Greg" de Bodt	22	unknown	Bangkok	Season 5	Gina/Bank		7–5	Jakjaan	Episode 9	8–5
Anthony "Thony" Blane	17	unknown	Sisaket	none				Kao	Episode 10	4-2
Saranyoo "CGame" Wichaikum	24	unknown	Bangkok	none				Jakjaan	Episode 10	4-2
Chitpon "Timmy" Sanner	24	unknown	Nonthaburi	none				Art/Sabina	Episode 10	4-2
Twatchanin "Boss" Darayon	23	unknown	Bangkok	none				Kao	Episode 10	1

== Episodes ==
=== Episode 1: Casting, Acting Skill, Team Selection, Photo Shoot and Promotional Video ===
First aired 5 October 2019

The host Antoine Pinto welcomed 7 new contestants, after which there were 7 more contestants from the past season, 5 from The Face Men Thailand Season 2. And male contestants from The Face Thailand Season 5 2 people as follows

- The Face Men Thailand season 2: Best, Bom, Paul, Kim, Film
- The Face Thailand season 5: Marcos, Greg

Afterwards, the 4 mentors of this season were released, including Cicada Akamsiri, Kao Jirayu, Art Araya and Sabina Akirapa. After the introduction of Mentor The All contestants have walked the model and showed off their acting skills. In the meantime, Mentor will give points to each contestant. The next round, dressed according to their own personality, so Mentor chooses to join the team. Divided into three teams Three to five people in each team, as chosen by the mentor or the contestants.

When selecting contestants, the team still uses the same rules as previous seasons. For this round, Kim is the person who scores the most points during the audition. Therefore, can choose a team without the mentor to have the right to choose, while holding only one who has no mentor to join the team

- Team Kao : Boss, Film, Marcos, Best, Thony
- Team Jakjaan : Greg, Peak, Bom, Paul, CGame
- Team Art/Sabina : Kim, Timmy, Jybb

After the selection of the work team is finished The first campaign was started immediately, namely shooting posters and promoting videos. In which everyone, including mentors, have to run a joint campaign Art / Sabina team with Kim, the team with the most votes from the audition, selected the ninth place to start as the first team. Followed by the cicada team And the Art / Sabina team

- The winning team of the campaign: Team Art Sabina
- Bottom two: None

=== Episode 2: A Walk of Remembrance ===
First aired 12 October 2019

- The winning team of the campaign: Team Art Sabina
- Bottom four: Marcos Alexandre, Best Phanthakoengamon, CGame Wichaikum and Greg de Bodt
- Eliminated: Best Phanthakoengamon

=== Episode 3: The Love of My Life ===
First aired 19 October 2019

- The winning team of the campaign: Team Kao
- Bottom two: Peak Rattanapet and Jybb Maha-Udomporn
- Eliminated: None

=== Episode 4: The Ride of Dignity ===
First aired 26 October 2019

- The winning team of the campaign: Team Jakjaan
- Bottom four: Jybb Maha-Udomporn, Timmy Sanner, Kim Goodburn and Film Uengwanit
- Eliminated: Kim Goodburn

=== Episode 5: Love is For All ===
First aired 2 November 2019

- The winning team of the campaign: Team Art Sabina
- Bottom two: Film Uengwanit and Greg de Bodt
- Eliminated: Film Uengwanit

=== Episode 6: Stay Cold ===
First aired 9 November 2019

- The winning team of the campaign: Team Kao
- Bottom two: Bom Thanawatyanyong and Jybb Maha-Udomporn
- Eliminated: Jybb Maha-Udomporn

=== Episode 7: The Magic Move ===
First aired 16 November 2019

- The winning team of the campaign: Team Art Sabina
- Bottom two: Thony Blane and CGame Wichaikum
- Eliminated: None

=== Episode 8: New Face Mission ===
First aired 23 November 2019

- The winning team of the campaign: Team Art Sabina
- Bottom four: Boss Darayon, Thony Blane, Marcos Alexandre and Paul de Bodt
- Eliminated: Marcos Alexandre

=== Episode 9 : The Adventurous Voyage ===
First aired 30 November 2019

- Winning coach and team: Team Kao
- Final three was chosen by Coach: Boss, Timmy, CGame
- Fourth was chosen by coach from winning campaign team: Thony
- Eliminated: Peak, Bom, Greg and Paul
- Special guest: Philip Thinroj, Chamnuyn Phakdeesuk and Adam Zima

=== Episode 10: Final walk ===
First aired 8 December 2019

- Winning coach and team: Team Kao
- Winning campaign : Boss
- The Face Men Thailand: Boss
- Runner-up: CGame, Timmy, Thony

== Summaries ==
=== Elimination table ===
Team Kao	Team Jakjaan	Team Art & Sabina

Contestant	Episode											
Contestant	1		2	3	4	5	6	7	8	9	10	
Challenge Winner	—N/a		Boss	Peak	Peak	CGame	Timmy	Thony	CGame	Boss	—N/a	
Boss	IN	IN	IN	WIN	IN	IMM	WIN	IN	LOW	WIN	WIN	WINNER
Thony	IN	IN	IN	WIN	IN	IN	WIN	LOW	LOW	WIN	IN	RUNNER-UP
Timmy	IN	WIN	WIN	IMM	LOW	WIN	IN	WIN	WIN	LOW	IN	RUNNER-UP
CGame	IN	IN	LOW	IN	WIN	IN	IN	LOW	IMM	LOW	IN	RUNNER-UP
Peak	IN	IN	IN	LOW	WIN	IN	IN	IN	IN	OUT		
Bom	IN	IN	IN	IN	WIN	IN	LOW	IN	IN	OUT		
Paul	IN	IN	IN	IN	WIN	IN	IMM	IN	LOW	OUT		
Greg	IN	IN	LOW	IN	WIN	LOW	IN	IN	IN	OUT		
Marcos	IN	IN	LOW	WIN	IMM	IN	WIN	IMM	OUT	JOIN		
Jybb	IN	WIN	WIN	LOW	LOW	WIN	OUT			JOIN		
Film	IN	IN	IN	WIN	LOW	OUT				JOIN		
Kim	IN	WIN	WIN	IN	OUT					JOIN		
Best	IN	IN	OUT							JOIN		

The contestant was part of the winning team for the episode.
The contestant was at risk of elimination.
The contestant was eliminated from the competition.
The contestant was immune from elimination.
The contestant was immune from elimination but was at risk of elimination.
The contestant was originally eliminated but invited back as a guest in a campaign.
The contestant was a Runner-Up.
The contestant won The Face Men.

- Episode 1 was the casting episode. The final thirteen were divided into individual teams of three to five as they were selected.
- In episodes 2–9, contestant who was eliminated to the competition. They will be able to attend Master Class, but can't do Campaign.
- In episode 2 team had lose campaign in episode 1 must choose one contestant for the elimination together with team had lose campaign in this episode. team Kao and team Jakjaan had lose campaign in 2 times. Kao nominated Best and Marcos while Jakjaan nominated CGame and Greg. Art and Sabina eliminated Best.
- In episodes 3–8, after announced campaign in episode. The show will choose one contestant for give immune from elimination.
- In episode 3, team Kao won the campaign. Jakjaan nominated Peak while Art and Sabina nominated Jybb for the elimination. Kao didn't eliminate both of them.
- In episode 4, team Jakjaan won the campaign. Kao nominated Film while Art and Sabina nominated all contestants for the elimination. Jakjaan eliminated Kim.
- In episode 7, team Art and Sabina won the campaign. Kao nominated Thony while Jakjaan nominated CGame for the elimination. Art and Sabina didn't eliminate both of them.
- In episode 8, team Art and Sabina won the campaign. Kao nominated all contestants for the elimination while Jakjaan nominated Paul for the elimination. Art and Sabina eliminated Marcos.
- In episode 9, Art Sabina Kao and Jakjaan were allowed to choose any one contestant to advance into the finale from the remaining eighth models. Timmy automatically advancing into the finale. Kao chose Boss. Jakjaan chose CGame. Team Kao won the campaign individually and chose Thony advancing into the finale. Paul Peak Bom and Greg were eliminated.

=== Campaigns ===
- Episode 1: Runway, Acting Skill and Self Administered 'Transformations' (Casting) / Photo Shoot and Promotional Video
- Episode 2: Thai silk costumes Fashion Show
- Episode 3: Lovely Mother and Son Photoshoot
- Episode 4: Fashion Video with Horse
- Episode 5: Man love Man acting
- Episode 6: Cool Stage Photoshoot
- Episode 7: Dancing Fashion Video
- Episode 8: Action short film
- Episode 9: Airplane Runway Fashion Show
- Episode 10: Acting and Finalwalk
